= 69th CEC Awards =

Spanish film awards

- Date: 3 February 2014
- Site: Cine Palafox, Madrid, Spain
- Hosted by: Lidia San José
- Organized by: Círculo de Escritores Cinematográficos

Highlights
- Most awards: Cannibal (4)
- Most nominations: Living Is Easy with Eyes Closed & Stockholm (7)

The 69th CEC Medals ceremony, presented by the Círculo de Escritores Cinematográficos, took place on 3 February 2014 at the Cine Palafox in Madrid. The gala was hosted by Lidia San José.

== Winners and nominees ==
The winners and nominees are listed as follows:

Best Film: Living Is Easy with Eyes Closed; 15 Years and One Day; Cannibal; Stockholm	Best Animation Film: Justin and the Knights of Valour; Metegol; El extraordinario viaje de Lucius Dumb; Gigantes, la leyenda de Tombatossals; Hiroku. Defensores de Gaia
Best Director: Manuel Martín Cuenca – Cannibal; Gracia Querejeta – 15 Years and One Day; David Trueba – Living Is Easy with Eyes Closed; Eugenio Mira – Grand Piano	Best New Director: Rodrigo Sorogoyen – Stockholm; Fernando Franco – Wounded; Manuel Sicilia – Justin and the Knights of Valour; Diego Quemada-Díez – The Golden Dream
Best Original Screenplay: David Trueba – Living Is Easy with Eyes Closed; Antonio Santos Mercero, Gracia Querejeta – 15 Years and One Day; Isabel Peña, Rodrigo Sorogoyen – Stockholm; Juan Cavestany – People in Places	Best Adapted Screenplay: Alejandro Hernández, Manuel Martín Cuenca – Cannibal; Santiago A. Zannou – Scorpion in Love; Alejandro Hernández, Mariano Barroso – All the Women; Francisco Roncal, Jorge A. Lara – Zip & Zap and the Marble Gang
Best Actor: Antonio de la Torre – Cannibal; Javier Cámara – Living Is Easy with Eyes Closed; Tito Valverde – 15 Years and One Day; Mario Casas – The Mule	Best Actress: Aura Garrido – Stockholm; Marian Álvarez – Wounded; Nora Navas – We All Want What's Best for Her; Inma Cuesta – Three Many Weddings; Belén Rueda – Ismael
Best Supporting Actor: Carlos Bardem – Scorpion in Love; Sergi López – Ismael; Juan Diego Botto – Ismael; Roberto Álamo – Family United	Best Supporting Actress: Terele Pávez – Witching & Bitching; Maribel Verdú – 15 Years and One Day; Verónica Echegui – Family United; Michelle Jenner – All the Women; Petra Martínez – All the Women; Nathalie Poza – All the Women
Best New Actor: Javier Pereira – Stockholm; David Solans – Son of Cain; Hovik Keuchkerian – Scorpion in Love; Berto Romero – Three Many Weddings	Best New Actress: Natalia de Molina – Living Is Easy with Eyes Closed; Olimpia Melinte – Cannibal; Belén López – 15 Years and One Day; Karen Martínez – The Golden Dream; Ella Kweku – Ismael; Virginia Rodríguez – Esto no es una cita
Best Cinematography: Pau Esteve Birba – Cannibal; Kiko de la Rica – Witching & Bitching; Daniel Vilar – Living Is Easy with Eyes Closed; Alejandro de Pablo Stockholm	Best Editing: José Luis Romeu – Grand Piano; Pablo Blanco – Witching & Bitching; Alberto de Toro – Three Many Weddings; Alberto del Campo – Stockholm
Best Music: Víctor Reyes – Grand Piano; Pat Metheny – Living Is Easy with Eyes Closed; Alberto Iglesias – Los amantes pasajeros; Joan Valent – Witching & Bitching	Best Documentary Film: Guadalquivir; Mary's Land; El efecto K. El montador de Stalin; Encierro
Best Foreign Film: Gravity; 12 Years a Slave; Tokyo Family; Amour

== Special awards ==
- Honorary Medal: Ana Belén
- Medal for the Literary Merit and Journalistic Merit: Carlos F. Heredero
- Medal for the Promotion of Cinema: Enrique González Macho
