= List of awards and nominations received by Antonio de la Torre =

Antonio de la Torre awards and nominations
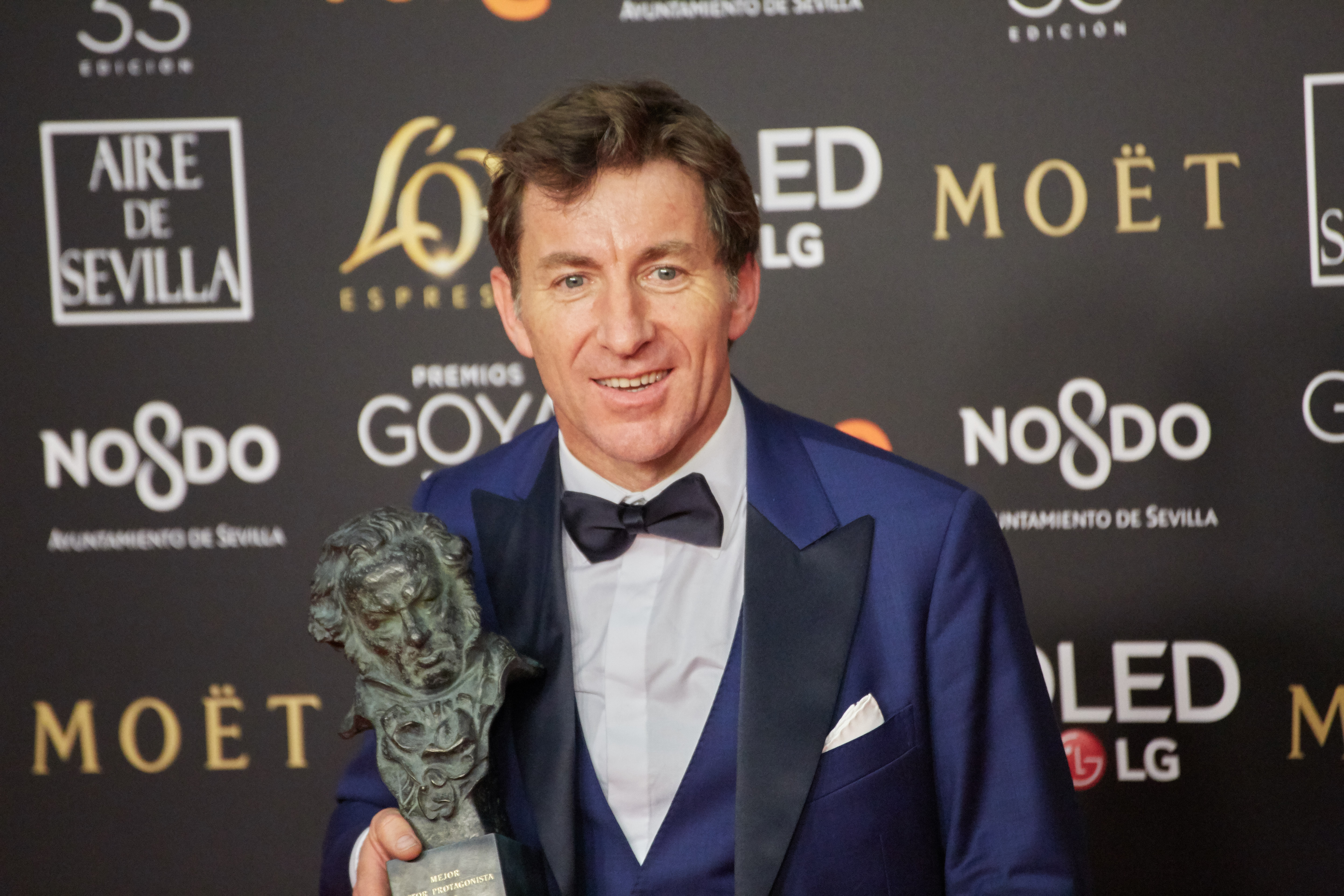
- De la Torre at the 2019 Goya Awards
Awards and nominations
Award	Wins	Nominations
Goya Awards	2	15
Actors and Actresses Union Awards	6	14

Spanish actor Antonio de la Torre has received several awards including two Goya Awards and six Actors and Actresses Union Awards. With 15 nominations, he is the most nominated actor overall at the Goyas.

De la Torre won the Goya Award for Best Actor for his role as a corrupt Spanish politician in Rodrigo Sorogoyen's The Realm (2018). He had won the Goya Award for Best Supporting Actor for his role as an infertile immate in the Daniel Sánchez Arévalo drama Dark Blue Almost Black (2006).

== Industry associations and guilds ==
=== Goya Awards ===
Goya Awards (Spain)
Edition	Category	Nominated work	Result	Ref.
21st (2007)	Best Supporting Actor	Dark Blue Almost Black	Won	
24th (2010)	Best Actor	Fat People	Nominated	
25th (2011)	Best Actor	The Last Circus	Nominated	
27th (2013)	Best Actor	Unit 7	Nominated	
27th (2013)	Best Supporting Actor	Invader	Nominated	
28th (2014)	Best Actor	Cannibal	Nominated	
28th (2014)	Best Supporting Actor	Family United	Nominated	
29th (2015)	Best Supporting Actor	Marshland	Nominated	
31st (2017)	Best Actor	The Fury of a Patient Man	Nominated	
32nd (2018)	Best Actor	Abracadabra	Nominated	
32nd (2018)	Best Supporting Actor	The Motive	Nominated	
33rd (2019)	Best Actor	The Realm	Won	
33rd (2019)	Best Supporting Actor	A Twelve-Year Night	Nominated	
34th (2020)	Best Actor	The Endless Trench	Nominated	
39th (2025)	Best Supporting Actor	Glimmers	Nominated	

=== Carmen Awards ===
Carmen Awards (Andalusia)
Edition	Category	Nominated work	Result	Ref.
2nd (2023)	Best Actor	On the Edge	Nominated	
4th (2025)	Best Supporting Actor	Glimmers	Won	
5th (2026)	Best Actor	Los Tigres	Nominated	

=== Gaudí Awards ===
Gaudí Awards (Catalonia)
Edition	Category	Nominated work	Result	Ref.
10th (2018)	Best Actor	Abracadabra	Nominated	
17th (2025)	Best Supporting Actor	Glimmers	Nominated	

=== Mestre Mateo Awards ===
Mestre Mateo Awards (Galicia)
Edition	Category	Nominated work	Result	Ref.
11th (2013)	Best Supporting Actor	Invader	Nominated	

=== Actors and Actresses Union Awards ===
Actors and Actresses Union Awards (Spain)
Edition	Category	Nominated work	Result	Ref.
16th (2007)	Best Film Actor in a Secondary Role	Dark Blue Almost Black	Won	
17th (2008)	Best Film Actor in a Minor Role	Mataharis	Nominated	
19th (2010)	Best Film Actor in a Leading Role	Fat People	Nominated	
20th (2011)	Best Film Actor in a Minor Role	Lope: The Outlaw	Won	
21st (2012)	Best Film Actor in a Minor Role	Cousinhood	Won	
22nd (2013)	Best Film Actor in a Leading Role	Unit 7	Won	
23rd (2014)	Best Film Actor in a Leading Role	Cannibal	Won	
23rd (2014)	Best Film Actor in a Secondary Role	Family United	Nominated	
24th (2015)	Best Film Actor in a Minor Role	Marshland	Nominated	
26th (2017)	Best Film Actor in a Leading Role	The Fury of a Patient Man	Nominated	
27th (2018)	Best Film Actor in a Secondary Role	The Motive	Nominated	
28th (2019)	Best Film Actor in a Leading Role	The Realm	Won	
29th (2020)	Best Film Actor in a Leading Role	The Endless Trench	Nominated	
33rd (2025)	Best Film Actor in a Secondary Role	Glimmers	Nominated	

=== Platino Awards ===
Platino Awards (Ibero-America)
Edition	Category	Nominated work	Result	Ref.
1st (2014)	Best Actor	Cannibal	Nominated	
6th (2019)	Best Actor	The Realm	Won	
7th (2020)	Best Actor	The Endless Trench	Nominated	

=== Fénix Awards ===
Fénix Awards (Ibero-America)
Edition	Category	Nominated work	Result	Ref.
1st (2014)	Best Actor	Cannibal	Nominated	

=== Forqué Awards ===
Forqué Awards (Spain)
Edition	Category	Nominated work	Result	Ref.
18th (2013)	Best Actor	Unit 7	Nominated	
19th (2014)	Best Actor	Cannibal	Nominated	
22nd (2017)	Best Actor	The Fury of a Patient Man	Nominated	
24th (2019)	Best Actor	The Realm	Won	
25th (2020)	Best Actor	The Endless Trench	Nominated	
30th (2024)	Best Actor	Glimmers	Nominated	

== Critics and screen journalists' associations and circles ==
=== Feroz Awards ===
Feroz Awards (Spain)
Edition	Category	Nominated work	Result	Ref.
1st (2014)	Best Main Actor in a Film	Cannibal	Won	
2nd (2015)	Best Supporting Actor in a Film	Marshland	Nominated	
4th (2017)	Best Main Actor in a Film	The Fury of a Patient Man	Nominated	
5th (2018)	Best Main Actor in a Film	Abracadabra	Nominated	
5th (2018)	Best Supporting Actor in a Film	The Motive	Nominated	
6th (2019)	Best Main Actor in a Film	The Realm	Won	
7th (2020)	Best Main Actor in a Film	The Endless Trench	Nominated	
12th (2025)	Best Supporting Actor in a Film	Glimmers	Nominated	

=== CEC Medals ===
CEC Medals (Spain)
Edition	Category	Nominated work	Result	Ref.
64th (2009)	Best Supporting Actor	One Word from You	Won	
68th (2013)	Best Actor	Unit 7	Won	
68th (2013)	Best Supporting Actor	Invader	Nominated	
69th (2014)	Best Actor	Cannibal	Won	
70th (2015)	Best Supporting Actor	Marshland	Nominated	
72nd (2017)	Best Actor	The Fury of a Patient Man	Nominated	
73rd (2018)	Best Actor	Abracadabra	Nominated	
73rd (2018)	Best Supporting Actor	The Motive	Nominated	
74th (2019)	Best Actor	The Realm	Won	
74th (2019)	Best Supporting Actor	A Twelve-Year Night	Nominated	
75th (2020)	Best Actor	The Endless Trench	Nominated	
80th (2025)	Best Supporting Actor	Glimmers	Won	
