= 1st Feroz Awards =

2014 Spanish film awards

- Date: January 27, 2014
- Site: Cine Callao, Madrid
- Hosted by: Alexandra Jiménez
- Organized by: Asociación de Informadores Cinematográficos de España

Highlights
- Best Picture: Stockholm (Drama); Three Many Weddings (Comedy)
- Best Direction: David Trueba; Living Is Easy with Eyes Closed
- Best Actor: Antonio de la Torre; Cannibal
- Best Actress: Marian Álvarez; Wounded
- Most awards: Witching & Bitching, Three Many Weddings and Living Is Easy with Eyes Closed (2)
- Most nominations: Witching & Bitching (7)

Television coverage
- Network: Paramount Channel

The 1st ceremony of the Feroz Awards was held at the Cine Callao in Madrid, on January 27, 2014. It was hosted by actress Alexandra Jiménez and aired on national TV through Paramount Channel.

== Winners and nominees ==
The winners and nominees are listed as follows:

Best Drama Film: Stockholm; Cannibal; Grand Piano; Wounded; We All Want What's Best for Her	Best Comedy Film: Three Many Weddings; Witching & Bitching; Family United; All the Women; Living Is Easy with Eyes Closed
Best Director: David Trueba — Living Is Easy with Eyes Closed; Fernando Franco — Wounded; Álex de la Iglesia — Witching & Bitching; Manuel Martín Cuenca — Cannibal; Daniel Sánchez Arévalo — Family United	Best Screenplay: David Trueba — Living Is Easy with Eyes Closed; Pablo Alén, Breixo Corral — Three Many Weddings; Manuel Martín Cuenca, Alejandro Hernández — Cannibal; Daniel Sánchez Arévalo — Family United; Isabel Peña, Rodrigo Sorogoyen — Stockholm
Best Main Actor: Antonio de la Torre — Cannibal; Javier Cámara — Living Is Easy with Eyes Closed; Mario Casas — The Mule; Eduard Fernández — All the Women; Hugo Silva — Witching & Bitching	Best Main Actress: Marian Álvarez — Wounded; Inma Cuesta — Three Many Weddings; Aura Garrido — Stockholm; Nora Navas — We All Want What's Best for Her; Candela Peña — Yesterday Never Ends; Belén Rueda — Ismael
Best Supporting Actor: Mario Casas — Witching & Bitching; Roberto Álamo — Family United; Carlos Areces — I'm So Excited; Raúl Arévalo — I'm So Excited; Carlos Bardem — Scorpion in Love	Best Supporting Actress: Terele Pávez — Witching & Bitching; Verónica Echegui — Family United; Petra Martínez — All the Women; Natalia de Molina — Living Is Easy with Eyes Closed; Rossy de Palma — Three Many Weddings; Bárbara Santa-Cruz - Three Many Weddings
Best Original Soundtrack: Víctor Reyes — Grand Piano; Alberto Iglesias — I'm So Excited; Joan Valent — Witching & Bitching; Josh Rouse — Family United; Pat Metheny — Living Is Easy with Eyes Closed	Best Trailer: I'm So Excited; People in Places; Three Many Weddings; Witching & Bitching; Cannibal
Best Film Poster: Three Many Weddings; I'm So Excited; Barcelona, nit d'estiu; Cannibal; Stockholm	Special Award: Ilusión

=== Honorary Feroz Award ===
- José Sacristán

== See also ==
- 28th Goya Awards
