= 1st Platino Awards =

- Date: April 5, 2014
- Site: Teatro Anayasi in Panama City, Panama
- Hosted by: Alessandra Rosaldo, Juan Carlos Arciniegas

Highlights
- Best Film: Gloria
- Best Actor: Eugenio Derbez; Instructions Not Included
- Best Actress: Paulina García; Gloria
- Most awards: Gloria (3)
- Most nominations: The German Doctor (5)

The 1st Platino Awards were presented at the Teatro Anayasi in Panama City, Panama on April 5, 2014 to honour the best in Ibero-American films of 2013.

Nominations were announced on 13 March 2014. The German Doctor received the most nominations with five.

Gloria won three awards including Best Ibero-American Film and Platino Award for Best Actress for Paulina García.

== Winners and nominees ==
=== Major awards ===
Best Ibero-American Film: Gloria; Heli; The Golden Dream; Witching & Bitching; Roa; Living Is Easy with Eyes Closed; The German Doctor	Best Director: Amat Escalante – Heli; David Trueba – Living Is Easy with Eyes Closed; Lucía Puenzo – The German Doctor; Sebastián Lelio – Gloria
Platino Award for Best Actor: Eugenio Derbez – Instructions Not Included as Valentín Bravo; Antonio de la Torre – Cannibal as Carlos; Javier Cámara – Living Is Easy with Eyes Closed as Antonio San Román; Ricardo Darín – Tesis sobre un homicidio as Roberto Bermúdez; Víctor Prada – The Cleaner as Eusebio	Platino Award for Best Actress: Paulina García – Gloria as Gloria Cumplido; Karen Martínez – The Golden Dream as Sara; Laura de la Uz – La película de Ana as Ana; Marian Álvarez – Wounded as Ana; Nashla Bogaert – Who's the Boss? as Natalie; Natalia Oreiro – The German Doctor as Eva
Best Screenplay: Gloria – Sebastián Lelio & Gonzalo Maza; Family United – Daniel Sánchez Arévalo; Living Is Easy with Eyes Closed – David Trueba; The German Doctor – Lucía Puenzo	Best Original Score: Underdogs – Emilio Kauderer; The Cleaner – Karin Zielinski; Witching & Bitching – Joan Valent
Best Animated Film: Underdogs; Anina; Justin and the Knights of Valour; El secreto del medallón de jade; Rio 2096: A Story of Love and Fury	Best Documentary: Con la pata quebrada; Cuates de Australia; La eterna noche de las doce lunas; O Dia que Durou 21 Anos; Sigo siendo
Best Ibero-American Co-Production: The German Doctor (Argentina · Spain); Anina (Uruguay· Colombia); Esclavo de Dios (Venezuela · Argentina · Uruguay); The Golden Dream (Mexico · Spain)

=== Honorary Platino ===
- Sônia Braga

== Films with multiple nominations and awards ==
The following films received multiple nominations:

Nominations	Film
5	The German Doctor
4	Gloria
4	Living Is Easy with Eyes Closed
3	The Golden Dream
2	Underdogs
2	Heli
2	Anina
2	The Cleaner
2	Witching & Bitching

The following films received multiple awards:

Awards	Film
3	Gloria
2	Underdogs
