= Feroz Award for Best Supporting Actor in a Film =

Annual Spanish film award

Feroz Award for Best Supporting Actor
- Awarded for: Best Supporting Performance by an Actor in a Spanish Film
- Country: Spain
- Presented by: Asociación de Informadores Cinematográficos de España
- Currently held by: Kandido Uranga – Maspalomas (2026)

The Feroz Award for Best Supporting Actor (Spanish: Premio Feroz al mejor actor de reparto) is one of the annual awards given at the Feroz Awards, presented by the Asociación de Informadores Cinematográficos de España.

It was first presented in 2014. Mario Casas was the first recipient of the award for his role as Antonio "Tony" in Witching & Bitching.

== Winners and nominees ==
=== 2010s ===
Year	Recipient	Character	English title	Original title
2014	Mario Casas	Antonio "Tony"	Witching and Bitching	Las brujas de Zugarramurdi
2014	Roberto Álamo	Benjamín "Ben" Montero	Family United	La gran familia española
2014	Carlos Areces	Fajas	I'm So Excited	Los amantes pasajeros
2014	Raúl Arévalo	Ulloa	I'm So Excited	Los amantes pasajeros
2014	Carlos Bardem	Carlomonte	Scorpion in Love	Alacrán enamorado
2015	José Sacristán	Damián	Magical Girl	
2015	Jesús Carroza	El Niño	El Niño	
2015	Eduard Fernández	Sergio	El Niño	
2015	Karra Elejalde	Koldo Zugasti	Spanish Affair	Ocho apellidos vascos
2015	Antonio de la Torre	Rodrigo	Marshland	La isla mínima
2016	Mario Casas	Adanne	My Big Night	Mi gran noche
2016	Carlos Álvarez-Nóvoa	Father	The Bride	La novia
2016	Antonio Bachiller	Luismi	Nothing in Return	A cambio de nada
2016	Quim Gutiérrez	Adolfo	Spy Time	Anacleto: agente secreto
2016	Javier Gutiérrez	The stranger	Retribution	El desconocido
2017	Manolo Solo	Santi "Triana"	The Fury of a Patient Man	Tarde para la ira
2017	Carlos Santos	Luis Roldán	Smoke & Mirrors	El hombre de las mil caras
2017	José Coronado	Jesús Camoes	Smoke & Mirrors	El hombre de las mil caras
2017	Luis Callejo	Curro	The Fury of a Patient Man	Tarde para la ira
2017	Javier Pereira	Andrés Bosque	May God Save Us	Que Dios nos perdone
2018	David Verdaguer	Esteve	Summer 1993	Estiu 1993
2018	Juan Diego	José Luis	Can't Say Goodbye	No sé decir adiós
2018	Bill Nighy	Edmund Brundish	The Bookshop	La librería
2018	Jaime Ordóñez	Israel	The Bar	El bar
2018	Oriol Pla	Soleràs	Uncertain Glory	Incerta glòria
2018	Antonio de la Torre	Juan	The Motive	El autor
2019	Luis Zahera	Luis Cabrera	The Realm	El reino
2019	Joan Botey	Jaume	Petra	
2019	Eduard Fernández	Fernando	Everybody Knows	Todos lo saben
2019	Ignacio Mateos	Víctor	Unbridled	Animales sin collar
2019	Josep Maria Pou	Frías	The Realm	El reino

=== 2020s ===
Year	Recipient	Character	English title	Original title
2020	Enric Auquer	Kiko	Eye for an Eye	Quien a hierro mata
2020	Asier Etxeandia	Alberto Crespo	Pain and Glory	Dolor y gloria
2020	Leonardo Sbaraglia	Federico Delgado	Pain and Glory	Dolor y gloria
2020	Eduard Fernández	José Millán Astray	While at War	Mientras dure la guerra
2020	Quim Gutiérrez	Emilio	Advantages of Travelling by Train	Ventajas de viajar en tren
2021	Juan Diego Botto	Antonio	The Europeans	Los europeos
2021	Chema del Barco	Ramón	The Plan	El plan
2021	Ramón Barea	Antonio	Rosa's Wedding	La boda de Rosa
2021	Sergi López	Armando	Rosa's Wedding	La boda de Rosa
2021	Àlex Brendemühl	Rostegui	Coven	Akelarre
2021	Alberto San Juan	Salva	The People Upstairs	Sentimental
2022	Urko Olazabal	Luis Carrasco	Maixabel	
2022	Celso Bugallo	Fortuna	The Good Boss	El buen patrón
2022	Manolo Solo	Miralles	The Good Boss	El buen patrón
2022	Pere Ponce	Colombo	The Replacement	El sustituto
2022	Chechu Salgado	Zarco	Outlaws	Las leyes de la frontera
2023	Luis Zahera	Xan	The Beasts	As bestas
2023	Diego Anido	Lorenzo	The Beasts	As bestas
2023	Ramón Barea	Koldo	Lullaby	Cinco lobitos
2023	Jesús Carroza	El Negro	Prison 77	Modelo 77
2023	Oriol Pla	Óscar	Wild Flowers	Girasoles silvestres
2024	La Dani	Dani	Love & Revolution	Te estoy amando locamente
2024	Luis Bermejo	Casero	Un amor	
2024	José Coronado	Julio Arenas / Gardel	Close Your Eyes	Cerrar los ojos
2024	Oriol Pla	Marcel	Creatura	
2024	Hugo Silva	Piter	Un amor	
2025	Óscar de la Fuente	Vicente	La casa	
2025	Enric Auquer	David	A House on Fire	Casa en flames
2025	Julián López	Nacho	Glimmers	Los destellos
2025	José Sacristán	Judge	Escape	
2025	Alberto San Juan	Carlos	A House on Fire	Casa en flames
2026	Kandido Uranga	Xanti	Maspalomas	
2026	Asier Etxeandia	Alonso	The Dinner	La cena
2026	Miguel Garcés	Iñaki	Sundays	Los domingos
2026	Joaquín Núñez	Gordo	Los Tigres	
2026	Miguel Rellán	Antonio de Sosa	The Captive	El cautivo

== See also ==
- Goya Award for Best Supporting Actor
- Goya Award for Best New Actor
