= Feroz Award for Best Main Actor in a Film =

Annual Spanish film award

- Awarded for: Best Leading Performance by an Actor in a Spanish Film
- Country: Spain
- Presented by: Asociación de Informadores Cinematográficos de España
- Currently held by: José Ramón Soroiz – Maspalomas (2026)

The Feroz Award for Best Main Actor in a Film (Spanish: Premio Feroz al Mejor Actor Protagonista de una Película) is one of the annual awards given at the Feroz Awards, presented by the Asociación de Informadores Cinematográficos de España (AICE).

It was first awarded in 2014. Antonio de la Torre was the first recipient of the award for his role as Carlos in the drama Cannibal.

== Winners and nominees ==
=== 2010s ===
Year	Recipient	Character	English title	Original title
2014	Antonio de la Torre	Carlos	Cannibal	Caníbal
2014	Javier Cámara	Antonio San Román	Living Is Easy with Eyes Closed	Vivir es fácil con los ojos cerrados
2014	Mario Casas	Castro	The Mule	La mula
2014	Eduard Fernández	Nacho	All the Women	Todas las mujeres
2014	Hugo Silva	José Fernández Cuesta	Witching and Bitching	Las brujas de Zugarramundi
2015	Javier Gutiérrez	Juan Robles	Marshland	La isla mínima
2015	Luis Bermejo	Luis	Magical Girl	
2015	Raúl Arévalo	Pedro Suárez	Marshland	La isla mínima
2015	Javier Cámara	Juanito	The Unexpected Life	La vida inesperada
2015	David Verdaguer	Sergi	10,000 km	10.000 km
2016	Ricardo Darín	Julián	Truman	
2016	Ramón Barea	Manu Aranguren	Negotiator	Negociador
2016	Javier Cámara	Tomás	Truman	
2016	Luis Tosar	Carlos	Retribution	El desconocido
2016	Pedro Casablanc	Luis Bárcenas	B, la película	
2017	Roberto Álamo	Javier Alfaro	May God Save Us	Que Dios nos perdone
2017	Eduard Fernández	Francisco Paesa	Smoke & Mirrors	El hombre de las mil caras
2017	Lewis MacDougall	Conor O'Malley	A Monster Calls	
2017	Alain Hernández	Nacho	The One-Eyed King	El rei borni
2017	Àlex Monner	Gabriel	The Next Skin	La propera pell
2017	Antonio de la Torre	José	The Fury of a Patient Man	Tarde para la ira
2018	Javier Gutiérrez	Álvaro Martín	The Motive	El autor
2018	Santiago Alverú	Bosco	Selfie	
2018	Antonio de la Torre	Carlos López	Abracadabra	
2018	Javier Cámara	Martín	Bomb Scared	Fe de etarras
2018	Andrés Gertrúdix	Luis	Dying	Morir
2019	Antonio de la Torre	Manuel López-Vidal	The Realm	El reino
2019	Javier Bardem	Paco	Everybody Knows	Todos lo saben
2019	José Coronado	Jaime Jiménez	Your Son	Tu hijo
2019	Javier Gutiérrez	Marco Montes	Champions	Campeones
2019	Javier Rey	Javier	Not the End	Sin fin

=== 2020s ===
Year	Recipient	Character	English title	Original title
2020	Antonio Banderas	Salvador Mallo	Pain and Glory	Dolor y gloria
2020	Antonio de la Torre	Higinio Blanco	The Endless Trench	La trinchera infinita
2020	Karra Elejalde	Miguel de Unamuno	While at War	Mientras dure la guerra
2020	Luis Tosar	Mario	Eye for an Eye	Quien a hierro mata
2020	David Verdaguer	Lluís	The Days to Come	Els dies que vindran
2021	Mario Casas	Daniel Aranda	Cross the Line	No matarás
2021	Raúl Arévalo	Miguel Alonso	The Europeans	Los europeos
2021	Javier Cámara	Julio	The People Upstairs	Sentimental
2021	Javier Gutiérrez	Javier Muñoz	The Occupant	Hogar
2021	David Verdaguer	Aleix	One for All	Uno para todos
2022	Javier Bardem	Julio Blanco	The Good Boss	El buen patrón
2022	Roberto Álamo	Juan	Josephine	Josefina
2022	Ricardo Gómez	Andrés	The Replacement	El sustituto
2022	Eduard Fernández	Òscar Camps	Mediterraneo: The Law of the Sea	Mediterráneo
2022	Luis Tosar	Ibon Etxezarreta	Maixabel	
2023	Nacho Sánchez	Julián	Manticore	Mantícora
2023	Karra Elejalde	Alfredo	Vasil	
2023	Miguel Herrán	Manuel	Prison 77	Modelo 77
2023	Denis Ménochet	Antoine	The Beasts	As bestas
2023	Nahuel Pérez Biscayart	Ramón	One Year, One Night	Un año, una noche
2023	Luis Tosar	Rafa	On the Fringe	En los márgenes
2024	David Verdaguer	Eugenio	Jokes & Cigarettes	Saben aquell
2024	Alberto Ammann	Diego	Upon Entry	
2024	Enric Auquer	Antoni Benaiges	The Teacher Who Promised the Sea	El maestro que prometió el mar
2024	Hovik Keuchkerian	Andreas	Un amor	
2024	Manolo Solo	Miguel Garay	Close Your Eyes	Cerrar los ojos
2025	Eduard Fernández	Enric Marco	Marco, the Invented Truth	Marco, la verdad inventada
2025	Pepe Lorente	Mauricio Aznar	The Blue Star	La estrella azul
2025	Urko Olazabal	Ismael Álvarez	I'm Nevenka	Soy Nevenka
2025	Antonio de la Torre	Ramón	Glimmers	Los destellos
2025	David Verdaguer	José	La casa	
2026	José Ramón Soroiz	Vicente	Maspalomas	
2026	Mario Casas	Sergio	Away	Molt lluny
2026	Álvaro Cervantes	Héctor	Deaf	Sorda
2026	Sergi López	Luis	Sirāt	
2026	Alberto San Juan	Genaro	The Dinner	La cena

==== Actors with multiple nominations and awards ====
Actors with multiple nominations
Nominations	Actor
6	Antonio de la Torre
5	David Verdaguer
5	Javier Cámara
4	Eduard Fernández
4	Luis Tosar
4	Javier Gutiérrez
3	Mario Casas
2	Roberto Álamo
2	Javier Bardem
2	Karra Elejalde
2	Raúl Arévalo

Actors with multiple awards
Wins	Actor
2	Antonio de la Torre
2	Javier Gutiérrez

== See also ==
- Goya Award for Best Actor
- Goya Award for Best New Actor
