= 28th Goya Awards =

- Date: 9 February 2014
- Site: Hotel Auditorium, Madrid
- Hosted by: Manel Fuentes
- Organized by: Academy of Cinematographic Arts and Sciences of Spain

Highlights
- Best Film: Living Is Easy with Eyes Closed
- Best Actor: Javier Cámara; Living Is Easy with Eyes Closed
- Best Actress: Marián Álvarez; Wounded
- Most awards: Witching and Bitching (8)
- Most nominations: Family United (11)

Television coverage
- Network: La 1
- Viewership: 3.57 million (19.8%)

The 28th Goya Awards ceremony, presented by the Academy of Cinematographic Arts and Sciences of Spain, took place at the Hotel Auditorium in Madrid on 9 February 2014. Manel Fuentes hosted the gala.

Living Is Easy with Eyes Closed won six awards, including Best Film, Director, Actor and Original Screenplay while Witching and Bitching won the most awards (8), mainly in craft categories.

The live broadcast on La 1 attracted 3,567,000 viewers (19.8% audience share).

== Winners and nominees ==
Nominations were read by Quim Gutiérrez and Clara Lago on 7 January 2014. The winners and nominees are listed as follows:

| Best Film: Living Is Easy with Eyes Closed; 15 Years and One Day; Cannibal; Family United; Wounded | Best Director: David Trueba – Living Is Easy with Eyes Closed; Gracia Querejeta – 15 Years and One Day; Manuel Martín Cuenca – Cannibal; Daniel Sánchez Arévalo – Family United |
| Best Actor: Javier Cámara – Living Is Easy with Eyes Closed; Tito Valverde – 15 Years and One Day; Antonio de la Torre – Cannibal; Eduard Fernández – All the Women | Best Actress: Marián Álvarez – Wounded; Inma Cuesta – Three Many Weddings; Aura Garrido – Stockholm; Nora Navas – We All Want What's Best for Her |
| Best Supporting Actor: Roberto Álamo – Family United; Carlos Bardem – Scorpion in Love; Juan Diego Botto – Ismael; Antonio de la Torre – Family United | Best Supporting Actress: Terele Pávez – Witching and Bitching; Susi Sánchez – 10,000 Nights Nowhere; Maribel Verdú – 15 Years and One Day; Nathalie Poza – All the Women |
| Best New Actor: Javier Pereira – Stockholm; Berto Romero – Three Many Weddings; Hovik Keuchkerian – Scorpion in Love; Patrick Criado – Family United | Best New Actress: Natalia de Molina – Living Is Easy with Eyes Closed; Belén López – 15 Years and One Day; Olimpia Melinte – Cannibal; María Morales – All the Women |
| Best Original Screenplay: David Trueba – Living Is Easy with Eyes Closed; Pablo Alén, Breixo Corral – Three Many Weddings; Daniel Sánchez Arévalo – Family United; Fernando Franco, Enric Rufas – Wounded | Best Adapted Screenplay: Alejandro Hernández, Mariano Barroso – All the Women; Santiago A. Zannou, Carlos Bardem – Scorpion in Love; Manuel Martín Cuenca, Alejandro Hernández – Cannibal; Jorge A. Lara, Francisco Roncal – Zip & Zap and the Marble Gang |
| Best Spanish Language Foreign Film: Blue and Not So Pink · Venezuela/Spain; The German Doctor · Argentina/Spain; Gloria · Chile/Spain; The Golden Dream · Mexico/Spain | Best European Film: Amour · Austria; The Hunt · Denmark/Sweden; The Great Beauty · Italy/France; Blue Is the Warmest Colour · France/Belgium/Spain |
| Best New Director: Fernando Franco – Wounded; Neus Ballús – The Plague; Jorge Dorado – Mindscape; Rodrigo Sorogoyen – Stockholm | Best Animated Film: Underdogs; El extraordinario viaje de Lucius Dumb; Hiroku: Defenders of Gaia; Justin and the Knights of Valour |
| Best Cinematography: Pau Esteve Birba – Cannibal; Juan Carlos Gómez – 15 Years and One Day; Kiko de la Rica – Witching and Bitching; Cristina Trenas – New York | Best Editing: Pablo Blanco – Witching and Bitching; Alberto de Toro – Three Many Weddings; Nacho Ruiz Capillas – Family United; David Pinillos – Wounded |
| Best Art Direction: Arturo García, José Luis Arrizabalaga – Witching and Bitching; Llorenç Miquel – Scorpion in Love; Isabel Viñuales – Cannibal; Juan Pedro de Gaspar – Zip & Zap and the Marble Gang | Best Production Supervision: Carlos Bernases – Witching and Bitching; Marta Sánchez de Miguel – Three Many Weddings; Josep Amorós – The Last Days; Koldo Zuazua – Zip & Zap and the Marble Gang |
| Best Sound: Charly Schmukler, Nicolás de Poulpiquet – Witching and Bitching; Eva Valiño, Nacho Royo-Villanova, Pelayo Gutiérrez – Cannibal; Carlos Faruolo, Jaime Fernández – Family United; Aitor Berenguer Abasolo, Jaime Fernández, Nacho Arenas – Wounded | Best Special Effects: Juan Ramón Molina, Ferrán Piquer – Witching and Bitching; Juan Ramón Molina, Juan Ventura Pecellín – Family United; Lluís Rivera Jove, Juanma Nogales – The Last Days; Endre Korda, Félix Bergés – Zip & Zap and the Marble Gang |
| Best Costume Design: Francisco Delgado López – Witching and Bitching; Cristina Rodríguez – Three Many Weddings; Tatiana Hernández – I'm So Excited; Lala Huete – Living Is Easy with Eyes Closed | Best Makeup and Hairstyles: María Dolores Gómez Castro, Javier Hernández Valentín, Pedro Rodríguez "Pedrati", Francisco J. Rodríguez Frías – Witching and Bitching; Eli Adánez, Sergio Pérez – Three Many Weddings; Ana López-Puigcerver, Belén López-Puigcerver – Grand Piano; Lola López, Itziar Arrieta – Family United |
| Best Original Score: Pat Metheny – Living Is Easy with Eyes Closed; Emilio Aragón – A Night in Old Mexico; Óscar Navarro – The Mule; Joan Valent – Witching and Bitching | Best Original Song: "Do You Really Want to Be in Love?" by Josh Rouse – Family United; "Rap 15 años y un día" by Arón Piper, Pablo Salinas and Cecilia Fernández Blanco – 15 Years and One Day; "Aquí sigo" by Emilio Aragón and Julieta Venegas – A Night in Old Mexico; "De cerca del mar" by Fernando Arduán – Alegrías de Cádiz |
| Best Fictional Short Film: Abstenerse agencias; De noche y de pronto; El paraguas de colores; Lucas; Pipas | Best Animated Short Film: Cuerdas; Blue & Malone, detectives imaginarios; O xigante; Vía Tango |
| Best Documentary Film: Las maestras de la República; Con la pata quebrada; Guadalquivir; Little World | Best Documentary Short Film: Minerita; El hombre que estaba allí; La alfombra roja; La gran desilusión |

=== Films with multiple nominations and awards ===
Films that received multiple nominations
| Nominations | Film |
|---|---|
| 11 | Family United |
| 10 | Witching & Bitching |
| 8 | Cannibal |
| 7 | Living Is Easy with Eyes Closed |
| 7 | 15 Years and One Day |
| 7 | Three Many Weddings |
| 6 | Wounded |
| 4 | Scorpion in Love |
| 4 | All the Women |
| 4 | Zip & Zap and the Marble Gang |
| 3 | Stockholm |
| 2 | The Last Days |
| 2 | A Night in Old Mexico |

Films that received multiple awards
| Awards | Film |
|---|---|
| 8 | Witching & Bitching |
| 6 | Living Is Easy with Eyes Closed |
| 2 | Family United |
| 2 | Wounded |

== Honorary Goya ==
In October 2013, the managing board of the Spanish Film Academy announced Jaime de Armiñán as the recipient of the 2014 Honorary Goya Award, recognising "a passionate dedication to the world of cinema since the 1960s, the creation of films that engage with their time, and the potential of stories conceived far removed from convention".
