= 23rd Actors and Actresses Union Awards =

2014 Spanish award ceremony

- Date: 10 March 2014
- Site: Teatro Coliseum, Madrid, Spain
- Hosted by: Llum Barrera, Secun de la Rosa
- Organized by: Actors and Actresses Union

Highlights
- Honorary career award: José Sazatornil

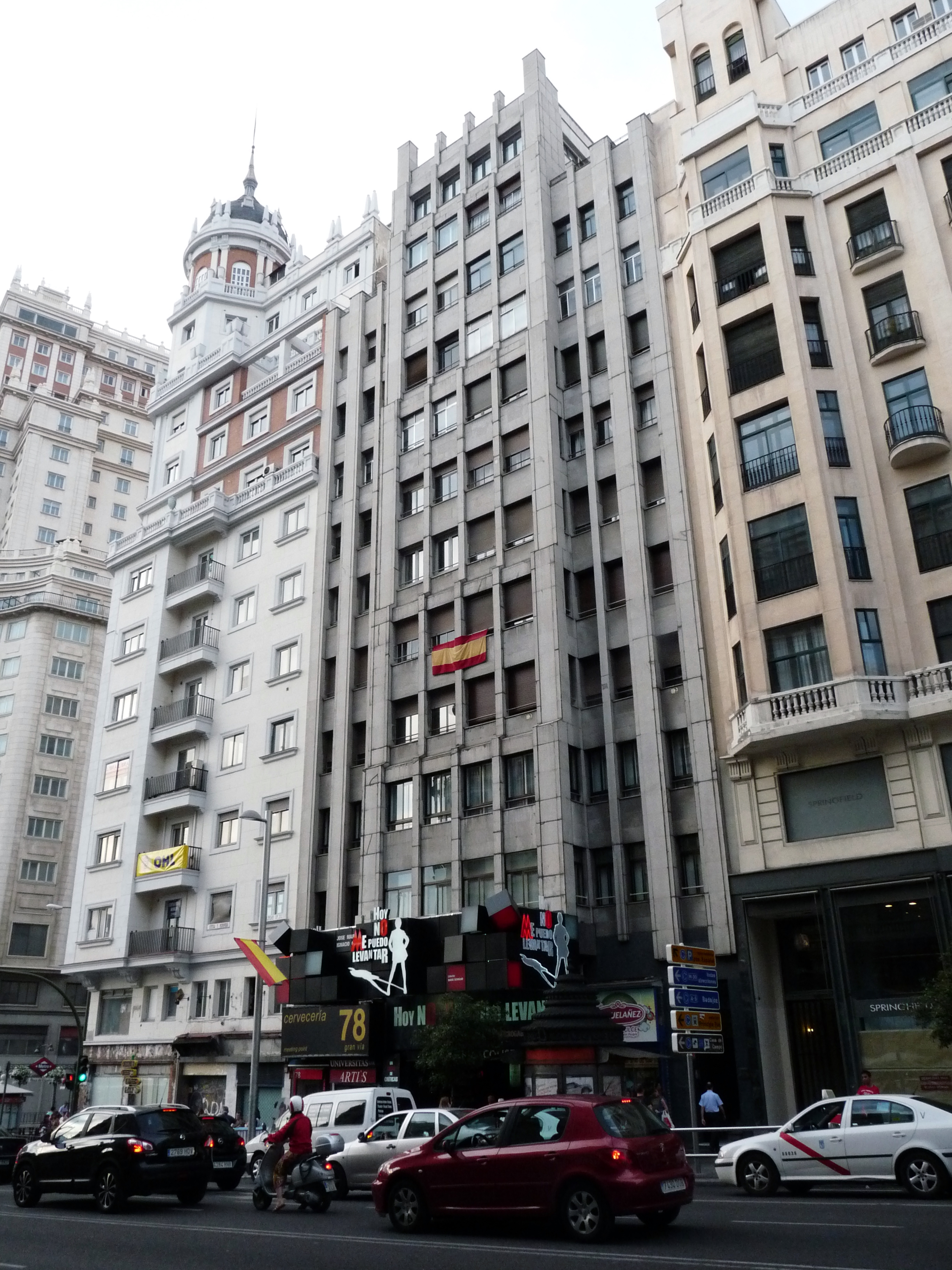
Coliseum Building in Gran Vía 78.

The 23rd Actors and Actresses Union Awards ceremony was held on 10 March 2014 at the Teatro Coliseum in Madrid. The gala was hosted by Llum Barrera and Secun de la Rosa.

In addition to the competitive awards, Carmen Pitillas, Dolores Ramírez, Delia Mateos and Pilar Vázquez (the promoters of the grassroots platform that managed to avoid the closure of the Renoir cinemas in Majadahonda) received the 'Mujeres en Unión' award, José Sazatornil, Saza the 'Toda una vida' career award and the Confederación de Artistas del Espectáculo (Conarte) union the Special Award.

== Winners and nominees ==
The winners and nominees are listed as follows:

=== Film ===
Best Male Performance in a Leading Role: Antonio de la Torre — Cannibal; Álex González — Scorpion in Love; Andrés Gertrúdix — 10,000 Nights Nowhere	Best Female Performance in a Leading Role: Susi Sánchez — 10,000 Nights Nowhere; Ingrid Rubio — La Estrella; Leticia Dolera — Violet
Best Male Performance in a Secondary Role: Roberto Álamo — Family United; Antonio de la Torre — Family United; Carlos Bardem — Scorpion in Love	Best Female Performance in a Secondary Role: Belén López — 15 Years and One Day; Lola Dueñas — 10,000 Nights Nowhere; Verónica Echegui — Family United
Best Male Performance in a Minor Role: Dani Muriel — Diamantes negros; Miguel Ángel Silvestre — Scorpion in Love; José Luis García — Cold Call	Best Female Performance in a Minor Role: Alicia Rubio — Family United; Carmen Mayordomo — Casting; Natalia Mateo — Casting

=== Television ===
Best Male Performance in a Leading Role: Emilio Gutiérrez Caba — Gran Reserva; Roberto Enríquez — Isabel; Rodolfo Sancho — Isabel	Best Female Performance in a Leading Role: Adriana Ugarte — The Time in Between; Blanca Portillo — Stolen Children; Michelle Jenner — Isabel
Best Male Performance in a Secondary Role: Carlos Santos — The Time in Between; Daniel Albaladejo — Isabel; Lluís Homar — Gran Hotel	Best Female Performance in a Secondary Role: Elvira Mínguez — The Time in Between; Alicia Borrachero — Isabel; Ángela Molina — Gran Reserva
Best Male Performance in a Minor Role: Tristán Ulloa — The Time in Between; Alfonso Lara — Isabel; Álvaro Monje — Isabel	Best Female Performance in a Minor Role: Asunción Balaguer — Gran Hotel; Kiti Mánver — Gran Hotel; Nuria Gallardo — Isabel

=== Theatre ===
Best Male Performance in a Leading Role: Asier Etxeandia — El intérprete; Carlos Hipólito — El crédito; Jorge Muriel — Los iluminados	Best Female Performance in a Leading Role: Kiti Mánver — Las heridas del viento; Aitana Sánchez-Gijón — La Chunga; Ana Gracia — Comedia y sueño
Best Male Performance in a Secondary Role: Felipe Andrés — El fantástico Francis Hardy, curandero; Daniel Pérez Prada — MBIG [McBeth Internacional Group]; Tamar Novas — Comedia y sueño	Best Female Performance in a Secondary Role: Inma Cuevas — Cerda; Ana Wagener — La anarquista; Xènia Reguant — Comedia y sueño
Best Male Performance in a Minor Role: Luis Callejo— Los miércoles no existen; César Sánchez — Tomás Moro, una utopía; David Lorente — La verdad sospechosa	Best Female Performance in a Minor Role: Nuria Gallardo — La verdad sospechosa; Pepa Pedroche — La verdad sospechosa; Violeta Pérez — Comedia y sueño

=== Newcomers ===
Best New Actor: Hovik Keuchkerian — Scorpion in Love; Jorge Usón — Feelgood; Llorenç González — Gran Hotel	Best New Actress: Olimpia Melinte — Cannibal; Arancha Martí — Family United; Beatriz Grimaldos — La gaviota
