= The Bar (film) =

2017 film by Álex de la Iglesia

- Theatrical release poster
- Spanish: El bar
- Directed by: Álex de la Iglesia
- Written by: Jorge Guerricaechevarría; Álex de la Iglesia
- Produced by: Mikel Lejarza; Mercedes Gamero; Kiko Martínez; Carolina Bang; Álex de la Iglesia
- Starring: Blanca Suárez; Mario Casas; Carmen Machi; Secun de la Rosa; Jaime Ordóñez; Terele Pávez; Joaquín Climent; Alejandro Awada
- Cinematography: Ángel Amorós
- Edited by: Domingo González
- Music by: Carlos Riera; Joan Valent
- Production companies: Pokeepsie Films; Nadie es Perfecto; El Bar Producciones AIE; Pampa Films
- Distributed by: Sony Pictures Releasing (Spain); Buena Vista International (Argentina)
- Release dates: 15 February 2017 (Berlinale); 24 March 2017 (Spain); 8 June 2017 (Argentina)
- Running time: 102 minutes
- Countries: Spain; Argentina
- Language: Spanish
- Box office: $3.7 million

The Bar (Spanish: El bar) is a 2017 black comedy thriller film directed, produced, and co-written by Álex de la Iglesia. Set in Madrid, it has the ensemble cast typical of its director, led by Blanca Suárez, Mario Casas, Carmen Machi, Secun de la Rosa, Jaime Ordóñez, Terele Pávez, Joaquín Climent, and Alejandro Awada. It is a Spanish-Argentine co-production.

The Bar was screened out of competition at the 67th Berlin International Film Festival, ahead of its Spanish theatrical release on 24 March 2017 by Sony Pictures and Argentine theatrical release on 8 June 2017 by Buena Vista International.

== Plot ==
After a strange man walks into the restroom of a bar in Madrid, and without warning, two exiting patrons are killed by a sniper. The streets are evacuated, leaving Elena, Nacho, Israel, Sergio, Amparo, Andrés, Trini, and Sátur trapped inside. Clandestine agents arrive outside and start a tire fire in the street, masking the area in thick smoke; this, along with news coverage not covering the gunshots, makes the group suspect an orchestrated coverup. As they argue, the stranger exits the bathroom, grotesquely diseased; before succumbing, he warns the others not to touch him. Andrés, supported by Amparo and Sergio, realizes that the street is under quarantine and, believing that the others were exposed, forces them into the cellar at gunpoint.

When Trini spills some liquid in the cellar, Nacho notices it does not pool on the floor and discovers a small sewer grate. Covering Israel in oil, they try to slip him through into the tunnel below only to become stuck. Upstairs, people are heard storming the bar, gunning down Andrés, Amparo, and Sergio, before setting the building on fire. Freeing Israel, air from the sewer allows the remaining patrons to survive the smoke. Once it is safe, the group ventures upstairs into the gutted bar, finding it taped off and surrounded; Nacho secretly pockets Andrés' handgun.

Finding the dead man's phone, they discover that he had brought four vials of vaccine for the disease: not enough for all five of them. Israel impulsively injects himself, leading to a fight with Nacho, but Israel disarms him and threatens the others with the firearm. During the fight, the remaining three vials fall down the sewer hole. Stripping Elena to her underwear and oiling her up, they successfully send her down to retrieve the doses; suspecting that she will be singled out, Elena instead hides them deeper in the tunnel while the others widen the hole enough for them to follow.

Seeing Israel becoming unstable, Nacho fights him for the gun, shooting him underwater and coercing Elena for the injections. When Sátur slips in the water, Trini tries to drown him so she can secure a vaccine for herself; Nacho makes to kill her in retaliation, but is unable to go through with it, so Trini takes her own life out remorse instead to try and save the others.

Israel, insane and still alive, ambushes them with a metal pipe, killing Sátur and pursuing Nacho and Elena to an exit. As the men grapple on a ladder, Elena accidentally drops her dose trying to help Nacho; instead, he gives her his dose, tells her to escape, and lets go, dropping him and Israel to their deaths. A traumatized Elena injects herself and emerges from a manhole just down the street from the burnt-down bar and outside the quarantine. Accepting a coat from a stranger, she shuffles away from the scene and disappears into the crowd.

== Cast ==
- Mario Casas as Nacho
- Blanca Suárez as Elena
- Alejandro Awada as Sergio
- Carmen Machi as Trini
- Terele Pávez as Amparo
- Joaquín Climent as Andrés
- Secun de la Rosa as Sátur
- Jaime Ordóñez as Israel
- Jordi Aguilar as a street sweeper
- Diego Braguinsky as an office worker
- Mamen García as a gypsy woman
- Daniel Arribas as the Sick Man
- Paco Sarro as Man 1
- Mari Giner as a Coat Lady
- Tony Lam as Chang
- Mariano Andres as Man 2
- Sue Flack as Jennifer
- Daniele Fileti as Frank
- Miguel Fajardo as a blond boy
- Helena Resano as the news presenter

== Production ==
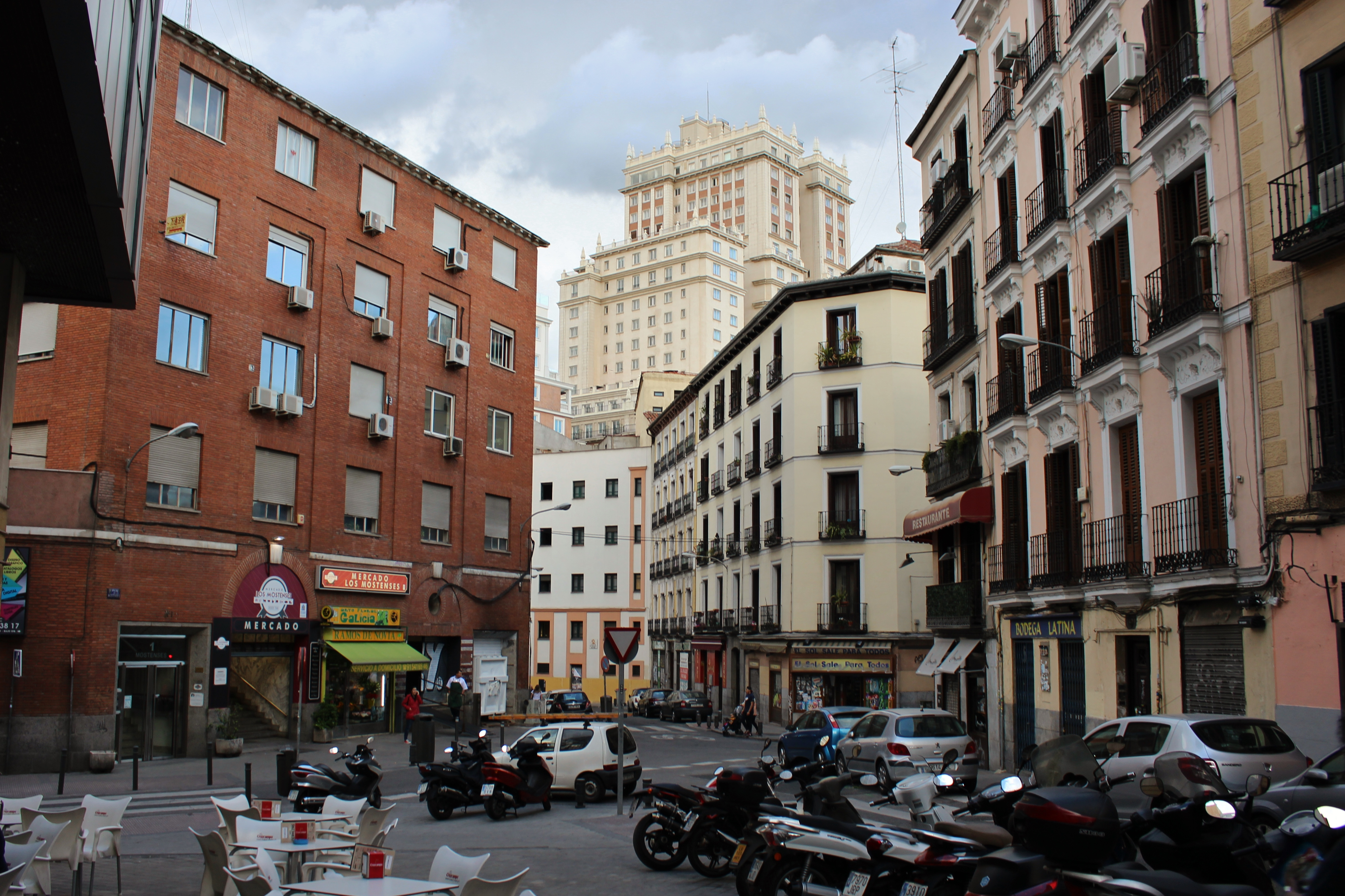
The film was shot at the store displaying the banner "El sol sale para todos" at the corner of Plaza de los Mostenses and Calle del Álamo.

The film was produced by Pokeepsie Films and Nadie es Perfecto along with Pampa Films, and it had the collaboration of Atresmedia Cine and Movistar+.

The premise of the film was inspired by life experiences of Álex de la Iglesia and Jorge Guerricaechevarría in the bar 'El Palentino', although the film was not shot there, but in a refitted grocery store at Plaza de los Mostenses, also in Malasaña.

== Release ==
The Bar was presented at the 67th Berlin International Film Festival on 15 February 2017. It opened the 20th Málaga Film Festival on 17 March 2017. Distributed by Sony Pictures Releasing España, it was released theatrically in Spain on 24 March 2017. It made it to the slate of the BAFICI, and, distributed by Buena Vista, it was released theatrically in Argentina on 8 June 2017.

== Reception ==
Owen Gleiberman of Variety declared the film "easily the worst movie I've seen at this year's Berlin International Film Festival", determining the "aggressively garish aesthetic of more-more-more [intensity]" to be "just ineptitude moving too fast for you to notice it".

Jonathan Holland of The Hollywood Reporter lamented that the film is "let down by a lazy script which, after the first half an hour or so, finds it as hard to escape from its self-imposed labyrinth as its characters do".

Marta Medina of El Confidencial welcomed an Álex de la Iglesia film "thrilling from start to finish" at last after so many pictures in his filmography with stretched out endings begging for euthanasia, with Iglesia proving in the film to be "the king of pathetic horror".

Mirito Torreiro of Fotogramas rated the film 4 out of 5 stars, deeming it to be De la Iglesia's best since The Last Circus selecting "the (overwhelming) pace of the entire peripeteia" as the best thing about the film.

Carlos Boyero of El País found the film's initial charm to be "short-lived", and the ending "unbearable".

== Accolades ==
| Year | Award | Category | Nominee(s) | Result | Ref. |
|---|---|---|---|---|---|
| 2018 | 5th Feroz Awards | Best Supporting Actor in a Film | Jaime Ordóñez | Nominated | |
| 2018 | 5th Feroz Awards | Best Poster | Sergio González Kuhn | Nominated | |
| 2018 | 5th Feroz Awards | Best Original Soundtrack | Carlos Riera, Joan Valent | Nominated | |
| 2018 | 5th Feroz Awards | Best Trailer | Rafa Martínez | Nominated | |
| 2018 | 32nd Goya Awards | Best Sound | Sergio Bürmann, David Rodríguez, Nicolas de Poulpiquet | Nominated | |
| 2018 | 5th Platino Awards | Best Sound | Sergio Bürmann, David Rodríguez, Nicolas de Poulpiquet | Nominated | |
| 2018 | 12th Sur Awards | Best Art Direction | José Luis Arrizabalaga, Arturo García | Nominated | |
| 2018 | 12th Sur Awards | Best Costume Design | Paola Torres | Nominated | |
| 2018 | 12th Sur Awards | Best Makeup | José Quetglas | Nominated | |

== See also ==
- List of Spanish films of 2017
- List of Argentine films of 2017
