= Stockholm (2013 film) =

2013 Spanish film

- Theatrical release poster
- Directed by: Rodrigo Sorogoyen
- Written by: Isabel Peña; Rodrigo Sorogoyen
- Produced by: Jon Díez; Álex Montoya
- Starring: Javier Pereira; Aura Garrido
- Cinematography: Álex de Pablo
- Edited by: Alberto del Campo
- Production companies: Caballo Films; Tourmalet Films; Morituri
- Distributed by: Festival Films
- Release dates: 25 April 2013 (Málaga); 8 November 2013 (Spain)
- Running time: 90 minutes
- Country: Spain
- Language: Spanish
- Budget: €60,000
- Box office: $351,340

Stockholm is a 2013 Spanish romantic drama film co-written and directed by Rodrigo Sorogoyen. It stars Javier Pereira and Aura Garrido.

== Premise ==
A young man ("he") tries to get a young woman ("she") he meets at a party to like him. She refuses, but he does not give up until he manages to change her mind. After they spend the night together, she discovers he is not like she thought.

== Cast ==
- Javier Pereira as "he"
- Aura Garrido as "she"
- Jesús Caba as male friend
- Susana Abaitua as female friend 1
- Lorena Mateo as female friend 2
- Miriam Marco as female friend 3
- Helena Sanchis-Guarner as young woman
- Javier Santiago as young man
- Daniel Jiménez as drunkard

== Reception ==
=== Critical response ===
On the review aggregator website Rotten Tomatoes, the film holds an approval rating of 83% based on 6 reviews, with an average rating of 6.8/10.

Jonathan Holland of The Hollywood Reporter deemed the film to be "an unsettling, minimalist meditation on the hidden dangers of teen romance", otherwise signalling its director "as someone who's already marked out his own distinctive style".

Andrea G. Bermejo of Cinemanía rated Stockholm 4 out 5 stars, summing it up to be a "little film with a surprise and a great Aura Garrido".

=== Accolades ===
Year	Award	Category	Nominee(s)	Result	Ref.
2013	16th Málaga Film Festival	Best Director	Rodrigo Sorogoyen	Won	
2013	16th Málaga Film Festival	Best Actress	Aura Garrido	Won (Note: Tied with Candela Peña for Yesterday Never Ends)	
2013	16th Málaga Film Festival	Best New Screenwriter	Isabel Peña and Rodrigo Sorogoyen	Won	
2014	1st Feroz Awards	Best Drama		Won	
2014	1st Feroz Awards	Best Screenplay	Isabel Peña and Rodrigo Sorogoyen	Nominated	
2014	1st Feroz Awards	Best Main Actress	Aura Garrido	Nominated	
2014	1st Feroz Awards	Best Film Poster		Nominated	
2014	69th CEC Awards	Best Film		Nominated	
2014	69th CEC Awards	Best New Director	Rodrigo Sorogoyen	Won	
2014	69th CEC Awards	Best Original Screenplay	Isabel Peña, Rodrigo Sorogoyen	Nominated	
2014	69th CEC Awards	Best Actress	Aura Garrido	Won	
2014	69th CEC Awards	Best New Actor	Javier Pereira	Won	
2014	69th CEC Awards	Best Cinematography	Alejandro de Pablo	Nominated	
2014	69th CEC Awards	Best Editing	Alberto del Campo	Nominated	
2014	28th Goya Awards	Best New Director	Rodrigo Sorogoyen	Nominated	
2014	28th Goya Awards	Best Actress	Aura Garrido	Nominated	
2014	28th Goya Awards	Best New Actor	Javier Pereira	Won	

== See also ==
- List of Spanish films of 2013
