= 10,000 Nights Nowhere =

- Theatrical release poster
- Spanish: 10.000 noches en ninguna parte
- Directed by: Ramón Salazar
- Written by: Ramón Salazar
- Produced by: Roberto Butragueño; Ramón Salazar
- Starring: Andrés Gertrúdix; Lola Dueñas; Najwa Nimri; Susi Sánchez; Rut Santamaría; Manuel Castillo; Paula Medina
- Cinematography: Ricardo de Gracia; Miguel Amoedo
- Edited by: Ramón Salazar; Abián Molina
- Music by: Najwa Nimri; Iván Valdés
- Production companies: Elamedia; Encanta Films
- Release dates: 10 November 2013 (Seville); 9 May 2014 (Spain)
- Country: Spain
- Language: Spanish

10,000 Nights Nowhere (Spanish: 10.000 noches en ninguna parte) is a 2013 Spanish film written and directed by Ramón Salazar. The cast features Andrés Gertrúdix, Susi Sánchez, Lola Dueñas, Rut Santamaría, Najwa Nimri, Manuel Castillo and Paula Medina.

== Plot ==
An unnamed man (the 'Son') experiences three parallel lives in Madrid (with his dysfunctional family: his 'Mother' and 'Sister'), Paris (with a 'Friend') and Berlin (with a group of friends: Claudia, Ana and Leon).

== Cast ==
- Andrés Gertrúdix as the 'Son'
- Lola Dueñas as the 'Friend'
- Najwa Nimri as Claudia
- Susi Sánchez as the 'Mother'
- Rut Santamaría as the 'Sister'
- Manuel Castillo as Leon
- Paula Medina as Ana
- Andrés Lima

== Production ==
Shooting took place over the course of three years.

== Release ==
The film premiered at the Seville European Film Festival in November 2013. It was theatrically released in Spain on 9 May 2014.

== Reception ==
Philipp Engel of Fotogramas rated the film 4 out of 5 stars, highlighting the editing pertaining the film's dreamlike structure, while citing certain lack of aesthetic simplicity and naturalness and some out-of-place character as negative points.

As a bottom line, Jonathan Holland of The Hollywood Reporter underscored the film to be a "valuably ambitious fare which is swooningly lovely, intensely personal, evocative -- and inevitably somewhat pretentious".

Sergio F. Pinilla of Cinemanía also scored 4 out of 5 stars, writing that Ramón Salazar tells "the unique chronicle of a lost man", comparing the film to works by Terrence Malick and Julio Medem, also considering that the director manages to bring out the qualities of two of the best Spain's specialists in "trance films" (Nimri and Dueñas).

== Accolades ==
| Year | Award | Category | Nominee(s) | Result | Ref. |
|---|---|---|---|---|---|
| 2014 | 28th Goya Awards | Best Supporting Actress | Susi Sánchez | Nominated | |
| 2014 | 23rd Actors and Actresses Union Awards | Best Film Actor in a Leading Role | Andrés Gertrúdix | Nominated | |
| 2014 | 23rd Actors and Actresses Union Awards | Best Film Actress in a Leading Role | Susi Sánchez | Won | |
| 2014 | 23rd Actors and Actresses Union Awards | Best Film Actress in a Secondary Role | Lola Dueñas | Nominated | |

== See also ==
- List of Spanish films of 2014
