= People in Places =

- Spanish: Gente en sitios
- Directed by: Juan Cavestany
- Written by: Juan Cavestany
- Produced by: Enrique López Lavigne; Juan Cavestany
- Cinematography: Juan Cavestany
- Edited by: Juan Cavestany; Raúl de Torres
- Music by: Nick Powell; Aaron Rux
- Production companies: Apaches Entertainment; JCPC
- Release dates: September 2013 (Toronto); 20 December 2013 (Spain)
- Country: Spain
- Language: Spanish

People in Places (Spanish: Gente en sitios) is a 2013 Spanish low-budget comedy film written and directed by Juan Cavestany.

== Plot ==
The plot comprises a series of anecdotal and fragmentary vignettes featuring an overarching link to the theme of Spain in crisis.

== Cast ==
- Eduard Fernández
- Raúl Arévalo
- Adriana Ugarte
- Eva Llorach
- Javier Gutiérrez
- Diego Martín
- Martiño Rivas
- Irene Escolar
- Maribel Verdú
- Antonio de la Torre
- Santiago Segura
- Coque Malla
- José Ángel Egido
- Enric Benavent
- Elisabet Gelabert
- Clara Sanchis
- Alicia Rubio
- Israel Elejalde
- Ernesto Sevilla
- Carlos Areces
- Alberto San Juan
- Tristán Ulloa
- Silvia Marsó
- Julián Villagrán
- Ernesto Alterio
- Juan Carlos Monedero
- Ana Rujas
- Luis Bermejo

== Production ==
The film is an Apaches Entertainment and JCPC production. Cavestany shot the film with the camera in hand. He had the collaboration of more than 80 actors and the participation of people who happened to pass by the shooting.

== Release ==
The film premiered in the 'Vanguard' slate of the 2013 Toronto International Film Festival. The festival run also included screenings in the 'Zabaltegi' section of the San Sebastián International Film Festival and the Sitges Film Festival. It was released theatrically in Spain on 20 December 2013.

== Reception ==
Jonathan Holland of The Hollywood Reporter wrote that the film is "inevitably patchy" but "interest rarely flags" because of "Cavestany's sincere, unpretentious attempt to get his ideas across in a novel way".

Andrea G. Bermejo of Cinemanía rated the film 4 out of 5 stars, deeming it to be "a book of disturbing stories that you see".

Eulàlia Iglesias of Ara rated the film 4 out of 5 stars, deeming it to be "a film outside the traditional orbits to portray a country that has lost its center of gravity".

== Accolades ==
Year	Award	Category	Nominee(s)	Result	Ref.
2014	1st Feroz Awards	Best Trailer	Raúl de Torres	Won	
2014	58th Sant Jordi Awards	Best Spanish Film		Won	

== See also ==
- List of Spanish films of 2013
