= Jaime Ordóñez =

Spanish actor

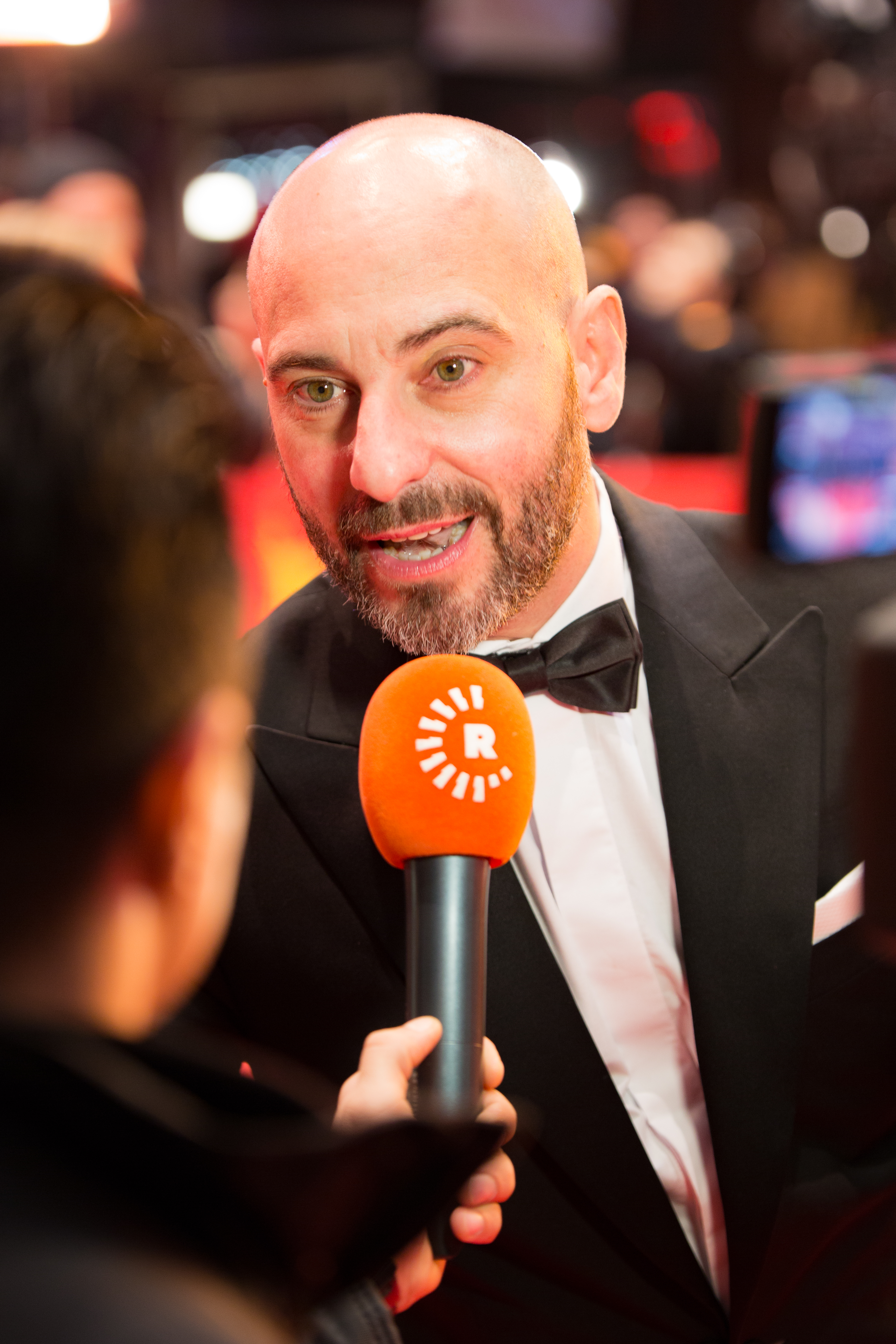
- Ordóñez in 2017
- Born: Jaime Ordóñez Martí-Aguilar; 19 August 1971 (age 53); Málaga, Spain
- Occupations: Actor; comedian

Jaime Ordóñez Martí-Aguilar (born 19 August 1971) is a Spanish actor.

== Life and career ==
Jaime Ordóñez Martí-Aguilar was born in Málaga on 19 August 1971. He gained early visibility to a Spanish television audience for his recurring appearances in sitcom Aquí no hay quien viva portraying an ultra-fast-speaking salesman. For over 25 years, he also was a collaborator of comedian José Mota.

He made his feature film debut with a bit part in Manuel Gómez Pereira's Queens (2005), which was followed by appearances in Torrente 3 (2006), Niñ@s (2006), and Isi & Disi: alto voltaje (2007). He became a regular in supporting roles in titles helmed by Álex de la Iglesia, including Witching & Bitching (2009), My Big Night (2015) and The Bar (2017), for which he earned a nomination for the Feroz Award for Best Supporting Actor. He also featured in The Unbearable Weight of Massive Talent.
