= A Pagan Party =

- Theatrical release poster
- Spanish: Fiesta Pagäna
- Directed by: Álvaro Brechner
- Screenplay by: Sofía Cuenca; Álvaro Brechner
- Produced by: Patricia González; Enrique Fernández
- Starring: Adrián Lastra; Guillermo Furiase; Jorge López; Adrià Mondaray; Carlos Librado; José Sospedra; Joan Arias; Marc Parejo; Luis Bondía; Antonio Dechent; Eduardo Velasco; Felipe García Vélez; Roberto Álamo; Michelle Renaud
- Cinematography: David Cortázar
- Edited by: Nacho Ruiz Capillas; Ángel Pazos; Álvaro Brechner
- Music by: José Manuel Cuesta; Mikel Salas
- Production company: Eterno Island Pictures
- Distributed by: Eterno Films
- Release dates: 22 October 2026 (Morelia); 6 November 2026 (Spain)
- Running time: 132 minutes
- Country: Spain
- Language: Spanish

A Pagan Party (Spanish: Fiesta Pagäna) is a 2026 musical comedy-drama film directed by Álvaro Brechner based on the folk metal band Mägo de Oz. It stars Adrián Lastra and Adrià Mondaray as respectively Txus di Fellatio and José Ändrea.

== Plot ==
The plot explores the trajectory of the folk metal band Mägo de Oz since forming in 1988 up to the leaving of vocalist José Ändrea in 2011.

== Cast ==
- Adrián Lastra as Txus di Fellatio
- Adrià Mondaray as José Andrëa
- Guillermo Furiase as Carlos Prieto "Moha"
- Carlos Librado as Carlitos
- Jorge López as Frank
- José Sospedra as Peri
- Jon Arias as Salva
- Marc Parejo as Fernando Ponce de León
- Luis Bondia as Kiskilla
- Antonio Dechent as Goyo
- Eduardo Velasco as Tibu
- Michelle Renaud as Patricia Tapia
- Neus Sanz
- Felipe García Vélez
- Roberto Álamo as Big Simon

== Production ==
The film is an Eterno Island Pictures production. Former Mägo de Oz bassist Pedro Díaz "Peri" participated as executive producer. Shooting locations included Gran Canaria and Fuerteventura.

Txus di Fellatio did not endorse the film and reprimanded Rafa Blas and Ix Valieri for participating in the original soundtrack.

== Release ==
A Pagan Party world premiered at the 24th Morelia International Film Festival on 22 October 2026. It received a Madrid premiere at Cine Capitol on 5 November 2026 ahead of its 6 November 2026 Spanish theatrical release by Eterno Films. The film was released in Mexican theatres on 5 November 2026, to be followed by a rollout in Colombia, Peru, Chile, Panama, Costa Rica, El Salvador, Guatemala, and Honduras on 19 November 2026, and later in Brazil, Argentina, Uruguay, Ecuador, Bolivia, Venezuela, Paraguay, and Nicaragua.

== Reception ==
Jesús Casañas of Mondosonoro gave the film 7 out of 10 points, pointing that it holds up, although the screenplay overuses rock and heavy metal clichés.

Pablo Vázquez of Fotogramas rated the film 3 out of 5 stars highlighting an "excellent" Lastra portraying Txus de Fellatio as the best thing about the film.

Enid Román Almansa of Cinemanía rated the film 4 out of 5 stars, lauding how it manages to strike a balance that reflects a genuine admiration for Mägo de Oz.

== See also ==
- List of Spanish films of 2026
