= All the Women =

- Theatrical release poster
- Spanish: Todas las mujeres
- Directed by: Mariano Barroso
- Written by: Mariano Barroso; Alejandro Hernández
- Produced by: Domingo Corral; Rafael Portela
- Starring: Eduard Fernández; Michelle Jenner; Lucía Quintana; María Morales; Petra Martínez; Marta Larralde; Nathalie Poza
- Cinematography: Raquel Fernández
- Edited by: Pablo Mas
- Music by: Ray Marhuenda
- Production companies: Kasbah PC; TNT
- Distributed by: Avalon
- Release dates: 24 April 2013 (Málaga); 18 October 2013 (Spain)
- Running time: 89 minutes
- Country: Spain
- Language: Spanish

All the Women (Spanish: Todas las mujeres) is a 2013 Spanish comedy-drama film directed and co-written by Mariano Barroso, starring Eduard Fernández based on the 2010 television series of the same name.

At the 28th Goya Awards, the film won Best Adapted Screenplay from a total of four nominations.

== Cast ==
- Eduard Fernández as Nacho
- Lucía Quintana as Laura
- Michelle Jenner as Ona
- María Morales as Marga
- Petra Martínez as Amparo
- Marta Larralde as Carmen
- Nathalie Poza as Andrea

== Production ==
The film was produced by Domingo Corral and Rafael Portela for Kasbah PC and TNT.

== Release ==
The film was presented at the 16th Málaga Film Festival on 24 April 2013. Distributed by Avalon, the film was released theatrically in Spain on 18 October 2013.

== Accolades ==
Year	Award	Category	Nominee(s)	Result	Ref.
2014	19th Forqué Awards	Best Actor	Eduard Fernández	Won	
2014	1st Feroz Awards	Best Comedy Film		Nominated	
2014	1st Feroz Awards	Best Actor	Eduard Fernández	Nominated	
2014	1st Feroz Awards	Best Supporting Actress	Petra Martínez	Nominated	
2014	6th Gaudí Awards	Best Actor	Eduard Fernández	Nominated	
2014	28th Goya Awards	Best Adapted Screenplay	Mariano Barroso, Alejandro Hernández	Won	
2014	28th Goya Awards	Best Actor	Eduard Fernández	Nominated	
2014	28th Goya Awards	Best Supporting Actress	Nathalie Poza	Nominated	
2014	28th Goya Awards	Best New Actress	María Morales	Nominated	

== See also ==
- List of Spanish films of 2013
