= Roberto Álamo =

Spanish actor

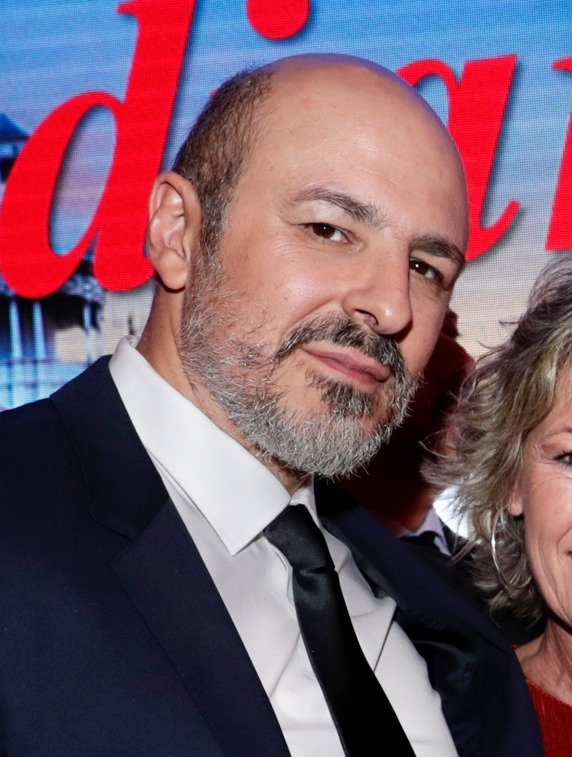
- Roberto Álamo in 2017
- Born: Roberto Martínez Felipe; 1 January 1970 (age 56); Madrid, Spain
- Occupation: Actor
- Years active: 1996-present

Roberto Martínez Felipe (born 1 January 1970), better known as Roberto Álamo, is a Spanish actor who has appeared in more than fifty films since 1996. Álamo won the Goya Award for Best Actor for his performance as Javier Alfaro in May God Save Us (2016).

== Life and career ==
Roberto Martínez Felipe was born in Madrid in 1970. He developed an interest in cinema at a young age after watching Jack Lemmon in Days of Wine and Roses. He trained at the Cristina Rota acting school and was a member of theatre company Animalario. He made his feature film debut in The Ugliest Woman in the World (1999).

The theatre play Urtain marked a turning point in his career. Álamo starred from 2008 to 2010 in the aforementioned play as the Basque boxer José Manuel Urtain, winning a Max Award for Best Actor for his performance.

His portrayal of Alfaro, a violent police inspector under the spotlight of their superiors and colleagues chasing a rapist and murderer of elderly women, in Rodrigo Sorogoyen's thriller film May God Save Us (2016) won him the Goya Award for Best Actor.

== Selected filmography ==
Year	Title	Role	Ref.
2003	Días de fútbol (Football Days)	Ramon	
2009	Gordos (Fat People)	párroco	
2011	De tu ventana a la mía (Chrysalis)	Paco	
2011	La piel que habito (The Skin I Live In)	Zeca	
2013	La gran familia española (Family United)	Benjamin	
2016	Que Dios nos perdone (May God Save Us)	Javier Alfaro	
2017	La niebla y la doncella (The Mist and the Maiden)	Teniente Navas	
2017	Zona hostil (Rescue Under Fire)	Capitán Torres	
2017	Es por tu bien (It's for Your Own Good)	Poli	
2018	Alegría tristeza (Happy Sad)	Marcos	
2023	El fantástico caso del Golem (The Fantastic Golem Affairs)	Antonio	
2024	Rita	José Manuel	
2024	Odio el verano (I Hate Summer)	Alonso	
2025	Cuatro paredes	Arturo	
2025	El cautivo (The Captive)	Abderramán	
2026	Hora y veinte		
2026	Días de agosto (Summer Days)	Fernando	
2026	Fiesta Pagäna (A Pagan Party)	Big Simon	

=== Television ===
Year	Series	Network	Character	Notes	Ref.
1996	Éste es mi barrio	Antena 3		1 episode	
1998	La casa de los líos	Antena 3		1 episode	
2005	Maneras de sobrevivir	Telecinco	Josete	13 episode	
2007	Génesis: En la mente del asesino	Cuatro	Director documental	1 episode	
2007	Los Serrano	Telecinco	Arturo	1 episode	
2007	La familia Mata	Antena 3		1 episode	
2007 - 2008	Los hombres de Paco	Antena 3	Aliado Uriarte	5 episode	
2008	Sin tetas no hay paraíso	Telecinco		2 episode	
2008	Aída	Telecinco	Martillo	1 episode	
2008	LEX	Antena 3		1 episode	
2009	Hermanos y detectives	Telecinco		1 episode	
2009 - 2013	Águila roja	La 1	Juan de Calatrava	44 episode	
2011	Estudio 1	La 1	Urtain	1 episode	
2013	Luna, el misterio de Calenda	Antena 3	Diego Mendoza	7 episode	
2014	Bienvenidos al Lolita	Antena 3	Cúper	8 episode	
2014	Hermanos	Telecinco	Xabi	4 episode	
2015	Bajo sospecha	Antena 3	Federico Sanz	3 episode	
2017 - 2019	Estoy vivo	La 1	Andrés Vargas Soto	8 episode	
2018	Fugitiva	La 1	José K.	8 episode	
2018	El Continental	La 1	Juan León de Baena	10 episode	
2020	Caronte	Prime Video / Telecinco	Samuel Caronte	13 episode	
2020	Antidisturbios	#0	José Antonio Úbeda	6 episode	
2020	Porvenir	#0	Alfonso Cortés-Cavanillas	4 episode	
2021	La reina del pueblo	Atresplayer	Diego	6 episode	
2022	Historias para no dormir	Prime Video	Claudio	1 episode	
2024	Asalto al Banco Central (Bank Under Siege)		Emilio Alonso Manglano		
2025	Innato (Innate)		Aitor		

== Accolades ==
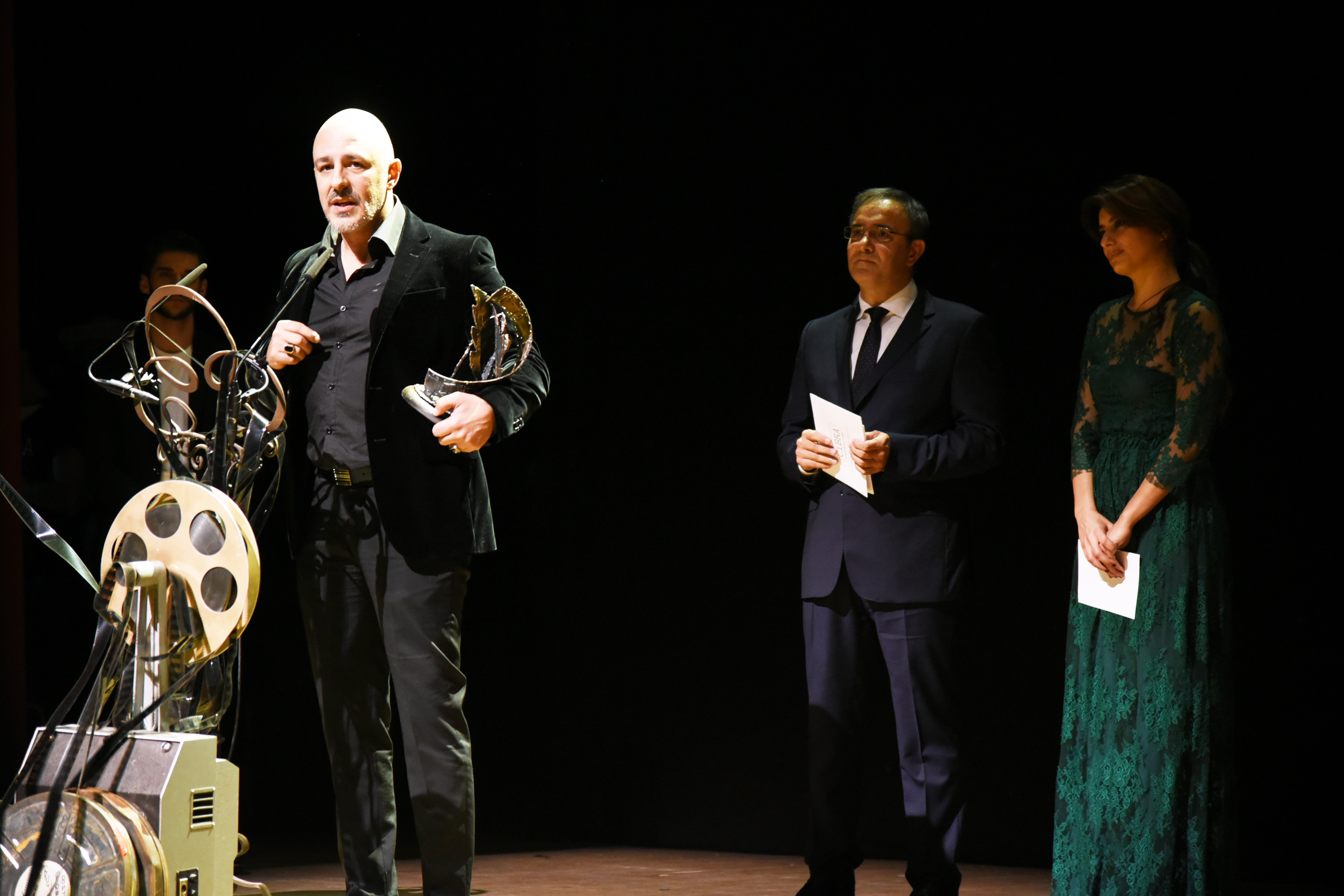
Álamo receiving an award at the closing gala of the 2016 CiBRA Festival held in Toledo

Year	Award	Category	Work	Result	Ref.
2014	1st Feroz Awards	Best Supporting Actor in a Film	Family United	Nominated	
2014	69th CEC Medals	Best Supporting Actor	Family United	Nominated	
2014	28th Goya Awards	Best Supporting Actor	Family United	Won	
2014	23rd Actors and Actresses Union Awards	Best Film Actor in a Secondary Role	Family United	Won	
2017	4th Feroz Awards	Best Main Actor in a Film	May God Save Us	Won	
2017	72nd CEC Medals	Best Actor	May God Save Us	Nominated	
2017	31st Goya Awards	Best Actor	May God Save Us	Won	
2022	9th Feroz Awards	Best Main Actor in a Film	Josephine	Nominated	
