= Alejandro Hernández (screenwriter) =

Cuban-Spanish screenwriter and novelist (born 1970)

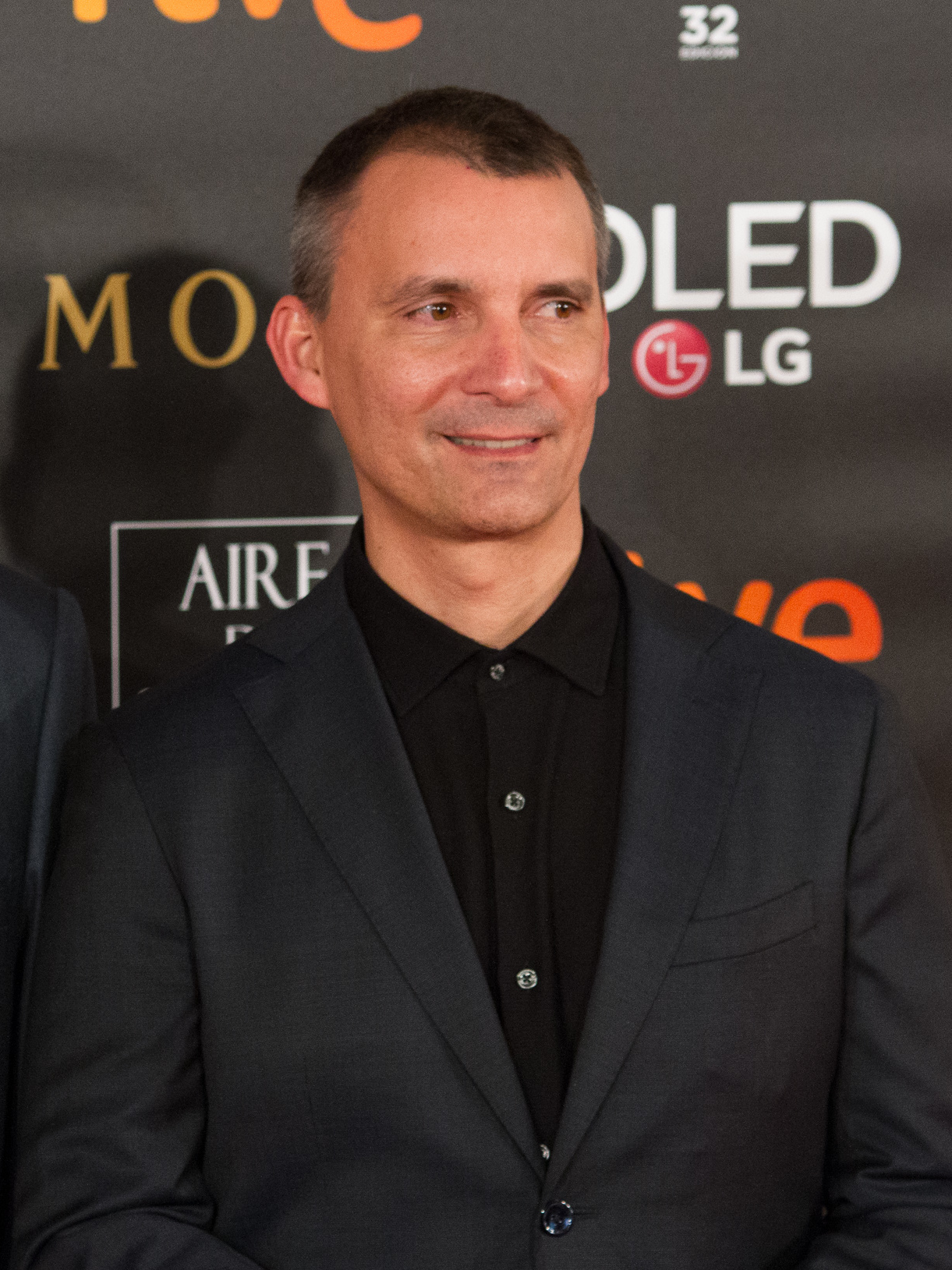
- At the 32nd Goya Awards in 2018
- Born: Alejandro Hernández Díaz; 1970 (age 55–56); Havana, Cuba
- Occupations: Screenwriter, novelist, lecturer

Alejandro Hernández Díaz (born 1970) is a Cuban screenwriter, novelist and lecturer based in Spain. He is a recurring co-scribe of the films directed Manuel Martín Cuenca and Mariano Barroso.

== Biography ==
Alejandro Hernández Díaz was born in 1970 in Havana. He served as a private in the Angolan Civil War. In 2000, he settled in Spain, wherein he has developed a career as a screenwriter. In addition to his published work and film credits, he has also lectured on journalism and audiovisual communication at the Charles III University of Madrid.

== Work ==
=== Filmography ===
Film

- El juego de Cuba (2001)
- Hormigas en la boca (2005)
- Malas temporadas (2005)
- La mitad de Óscar (2010)
- Retornos (2010)
- Lo mejor de Eva (2011)
- Caníbal (2013)
- Todas las mujeres (2013)
- 1898: Los últimos de Filipinas (2016)
- Brava (2017)
- El autor (2017)
- Los buenos demonios (2018)
- Maras (2019)
- Mientras dure la guerra (2019)
- Adú (2020)
- La hija (2021)

Television

- Todas las mujeres (2010)
- El padre de Caín (2016)
- El día de mañana (2018)
- Los nuestros (2015-2019)
- Criminal: España (2019)
- La línea invisible (2020)
- La Fortuna (2021)

=== Novels ===
- La milla (Letras Cubanas, 1996)
- Algún demonio (Salto de Página, 2007)
- Oro ciego (Salto de Página, 2009)

== Accolades ==
Year	Award	Category	Work	Result	Ref.
2014	1st Feroz Awards	Best Screenplay	Cannibal	Nominated	
2014	69th CEC Medals	Best Adapted Screenplay	Cannibal	Won	
2014	28th Goya Awards	Best Adapted Screenplay	Cannibal	Nominated	
2014	28th Goya Awards	Best Adapted Screenplay	All the Women	Won	
2018	5th Feroz Awards	Best Screenplay	The Motive	Nominated	
2018	32nd Goya Awards	Best Original Screenplay	The Motive	Nominated	
2018	20th Iris Awards	Best Screenplay	El día de mañana	Nominated	
2020	34th Goya Awards	Best Original Screenplay	While at War	Nominated	
2020	7th Platino Awards	Best Screenplay	While at War	Nominated	
2021	35th Goya Awards	Best Original Screenplay	Adú	Nominated	
2022	1st Carmen Awards	Best Screenplay	The Daughter	Won	

== Bibliography ==
- Gutiérrez, Irene; Moya, Tamara (2020). Vive, siente, escucha. Un retrato de Alejandro Hernández (PDF). TECMERIN; Instituto Universitario del Cine Español. ISBN 978-84-16829-58-3.
