= María Dolores Gómez Castro =

Spanish film makeup artist

María Dolores Gómez Castro (Córdoba, 1983) known as Lola Gómez, is a Spanish film makeup artist and special effects artist. She won the Goya Award for Best Makeup and Hairstyling in 2014 for her work in Las brujas de Zugarramurdi (Witching and Bitching), by director Alex de la Iglesia.

== Professional career ==
Born in the area of Colón, in Córdoba, she was trained in Madrid. She began her career in the world of fashion, to later focus on film and television. Since 2004, when she made her first series as a head make-up artist, she has not stopped working in the audiovisual and arts sectors. She collaborated with Francisco Rodríguez in Tierra de Lobos and Isabel series.

María Dolores Gómez Castro, Francisco Rodríguez, Javier Hernández Valentín and Pedro Rodríguez won the Goya for Best Makeup and Hairstyling in 2014 for Las brujas de Zugarramurdi, directed by Álex de la Iglesia.

== Awards ==
Goya for best makeup and hairdressing in 2014 for Las brujas de Zugarramurdi.
