= Asociación de Informadores Cinematográficos de España =

- Abbreviation: AICE
- Formation: 2013; 13 years ago
- Type: Voluntary association
- Members: 250 (January 2023)
- President: María Guerra

The Asociación de Informadores Cinematográficos de España (lit. 'Association of Cinematographic Informers of Spain'; AICE) is an association of entertainment journalists and film and television critics of Spain in television, radio, and online and print media. Created in 2013, it annually bestows the Feroz Awards.

== History ==
AICE was created in 2013 intending to bridge the gap between critics and entertainment journalists, between film and series, and between the digital and non-digital media. Initially presided by La Razón journalist David Carrón, the association had 160 voting members for the first edition of the Feroz awards. After holding internal elections, Pedro Vallín replaced Carrón at the helm of the association, then with 180 voting members. María Guerra has since been elected to two mandates. In 2018, AICE began to hold the Lo Que Viene ('What Is Coming') festival in Navarre to showcase upcoming releases in the entertainment season. In addition to the Feroz Awards, the AICE also recognises the best film in the official selection of the San Sebastián International Film Festival in the Feroz Zinemaldia Award and (since 2017) the best film in the official selection of the Málaga Film Festival in the Feroz Puerta Oscura Award. For the 10th edition of the Feroz Awards, AICE accounted for 250 members.
