= Wounded (2013 film) =

- Film poster
- Spanish: La herida
- Directed by: Fernando Franco
- Written by: Enric Rufas; Fernando Franco
- Produced by: Roberto Butragueño; Manuel Calvo; Fernando Franco; Mario Madueño; Samuel Martínez; Koldo Zuazua
- Starring: Marian Álvarez; Rosana Pastor
- Cinematography: Santiago Racaj
- Edited by: David Pinillos
- Production companies: Kowalski Films; Pantalla Partida; Elamedia; Encanta Films; Ferdydurke Films
- Release dates: September 2013 (SSIFF); 4 October 2013 (Spain)
- Running time: 95 minutes
- Country: Spain
- Language: Spanish

Wounded (Spanish: La herida) is a 2013 Spanish drama film directed by Fernando Franco, who also co-wrote it. The film stars Marian Álvarez. It is a Kowalski Films, Pantalla Partida, Elamedia, Encanta Films and Ferdydurke Films production.

== Plot ==
The fiction follows a 28-year-old woman with a dysfunctional personality outside her job, unknowingly suffering from a BPD condition.

== Cast ==
- Marian Álvarez as Ana
- Rosana Pastor as Madre Ana
- Manolo Solo as Jaime
- Andrés Gertrúdix as Álex
- Ramón Agirre as Padre Ana
- Ramón Barea as Martín

== Release ==
The film screened at the San Sebastián International Film Festival (SSIFF) in September 2013. It was theatrically released in Spain on 4 October 2013.

== Awards and nominations ==
Year	Award	Category	Nominee(s)	Result	Ref.
2013	61st San Sebastián International Film Festival	Silver Shell for Best Actress	Marian Álvarez	Won	
2013	28th Mar del Plata International Film Festival	Silver Astor for Best Actress	Marian Álvarez	Won	
2014	19th Forqué Awards	Best Film		Won	
2014	19th Forqué Awards	Best Actress	Marian Álvarez	Won	
2014	1st Feroz Awards	Best Drama Film		Nominated	
2014	1st Feroz Awards	Best Director	Fernando Franco	Nominated	
2014	1st Feroz Awards	Best Main Actress in a Film	Marian Álvarez	Won	
2014	69th CEC Awards	Best New Director	Fernando Franco	Nominated	
2014	69th CEC Awards	Best Actress	Marian Álvarez	Nominated	
2014	28th Goya Awards	Best Film		Nominated	
2014	28th Goya Awards	Best Actress	Marian Álvarez	Won	
2014	28th Goya Awards	Best Original Screenplay	Enric Rufas, Fernando Franco	Nominated	
2014	28th Goya Awards	Best New Director	Fernando Franco	Won	
2014	28th Goya Awards	Best Editing	David Pinillos	Nominated	
2014	28th Goya Awards	Best Sound	Aitor Berenguer Abasolo, Jaime Fernández, Nacho Arenas	Nominated	
2014	27th European Film Awards	Best Actress	Marian Álvarez	Nominated	

== See also ==
- List of Spanish films of 2013
