= 15 Years and One Day =

2013 film

- Film poster
- Spanish: 15 años y un día
- Directed by: Gracia Querejeta
- Written by: Gracia Querejeta; Antonio Mercero
- Produced by: Gerardo Herrero; Mariela Besuievsky
- Starring: Tito Valverde; Maribel Verdú; Arón Piper; Belén López; Susi Sánchez
- Cinematography: Juan Carlos Gómez
- Edited by: Nacho Ruiz Capillas
- Music by: Pablo Salinas
- Production companies: Tornasol Films; Castafiore Films
- Release date: 25 April 2013
- Running time: 96 minutes
- Country: Spain
- Language: Spanish

15 Years and One Day (Spanish: 15 años y un día) is a 2013 Spanish drama film directed and co-written by Gracia Querejeta. The film was selected as the Spanish entry for the Best Foreign Language Film at the 86th Academy Awards, but it was not nominated. The film is a Tornasol Films and Castafiore Films production, with the participation of TVE and Canal+ and the sponsor of Estudios Ciudad de la Luz.

== Cast ==
- Tito Valverde as Max
- Maribel Verdú as Margo
- Arón Piper as Jon
- Belén López as Aledo
- Susi Sánchez
- Jesús Castejón
- Boris Cucalón as Toni
- Bernat Grau as Moi
- Luis Jaspe as Aldrin
- Peter Nikolas as Svenco policia ruso
- Pau Poch
- Mikel Tello

== Accolades ==
Year	Award	Category	Nominee(s)	Result	Ref.
2013	16th Málaga Spanish Film Festival	Golden Biznaga		Won	
2013	16th Málaga Spanish Film Festival	Silver Biznaga for Best Screenplay	Gracia Querejeta, Antonio Santos	Won	
2013	16th Málaga Spanish Film Festival	Silver Biznaga for Best Original Soundtrack	Pablo Salinas	Won	
2013	16th Málaga Spanish Film Festival	Silver Biznaga for Special Jury Prize		Won	
2014	28th Goya Awards	Best Film		Nominated	
2014	28th Goya Awards	Best Director	Gracia Querejeta	Nominated	
2014	28th Goya Awards	Best Actor	Tito Valverde	Nominated	
2014	28th Goya Awards	Best Supporting Actress	Maribel Verdú	Nominated	
2014	28th Goya Awards	Best New Actress	Belén López	Nominated	
2014	28th Goya Awards	Best Cinematography	Juan Carlos Gómez	Nominated	
2014	28th Goya Awards	Best Original Song	"Rap 15 años y un día" by Arón Piper, Pablo Salinas, Cecilia Fernández Blanco	Nominated	

== See also ==
- List of Spanish films of 2013
- List of submissions to the 86th Academy Awards for Best Foreign Language Film
- List of Spanish submissions for the Academy Award for Best Foreign Language Film
