= Three Many Weddings =

- Theatrical release poster
- Spanish: 3 bodas de más
- Directed by: Javier Ruiz Caldera
- Written by: Pablo Alén; Breixo Corral
- Produced by: Eneko Lizarraga Arratibel; Francisco Sánchez Ortiz; Enrique López Lavigne; Belén Atienza; Mercedes Gamero; Mikel Lejarza
- Starring: Inma Cuesta; Martiño Rivas; Quim Gutiérrez; Paco León; Laura Sánchez; Berto Romero; Rossy de Palma
- Cinematography: Arnau Valls Colomer
- Edited by: Alberto de Toro
- Music by: Javier Rodero
- Production companies: Think Studio; Ciudadano Ciskul; Apaches Entertainment; Atresmedia Cine
- Distributed by: Warner Bros. Pictures
- Release dates: 7 September 2013 (Venice); 5 December 2013 (Spain)
- Running time: 94 minutes
- Country: Spain
- Language: Spanish
- Box office: $9 million

Three Many Weddings (Spanish: 3 bodas de más) is a 2013 Spanish romantic comedy directed by Javier Ruiz Caldera and starring Inma Cuesta and Martiño Rivas. It was nominated for seven Goya Awards and won the Best Comedy award at the 1st Feroz Awards.

== Plot ==
Ruth is a marine biologist who, in less than a month, is invited to the weddings of three of her ex-boyfriends. Single and unable to turn down any of the invitations, she manages to convince her new intern, Dani, to go with her. During the weddings, plenty of outlandish events take place that eventually lead Ruth to decide who she wants to be with in the future.

== Cast ==
- Inma Cuesta as Ruth
- Martiño Rivas as Dani
- Quim Gutiérrez as Jonás
- Berto Romero as Pedro
- Paco León as Mikel
- Laura Sánchez as Álex
- Silvia Abril as Lucía
- Rossy de Palma as Mónica
- María Botto as Ruth's boss
- Joaquín Reyes as Ruth's father
- Bárbara Santa-Cruz as Catalina

== Production ==
Eneko Lizarraga Arratibel, Francisco Sánchez Ortiz, Enrique López Lavigne, Belén Atienza, Mercedes Gamero, and Mikel Lejarza took over production duties.

== Release ==
The film screened in the Venice Days independent section of the 70th Venice International Film Festival. It also screened as the opening film of the 10th Seville European Film Festival on 8 November 2013.

== Awards and nominations ==
Awards	Category	Nominated	Result
Goya Awards	Best Main Actress	Inma Cuesta	Nominated
Goya Awards	Best Original Screenplay	Pablo Alén & Breixo Corral	Nominated
Goya Awards	Best New Actor	Berto Romero	Nominated
Goya Awards	Best Production	Marta Sánchez de Miguel	Nominated
Goya Awards	Best Editing	Alberto de Toro	Nominated
Goya Awards	Best Costume Design	Cristina Rodríguez	Nominated
Goya Awards	Best Make-Up and Hairstyles	Eli Adánez & Sergio Pérez	Nominated
Premios Feroz	Best Comedy		Won
Premios Feroz	Best Screenplay	Pablo Alén & Breixo Corral	Nominated
Premios Feroz	Best Main Actress	Inma Cuesta	Nominated
Premios Feroz	Best Supporting Actress	Rossy de Palma	Nominated
Premios Feroz	Best Supporting Actress	Bárbara Santa-Cruz	Nominated
Premios Feroz	Best Trailer		Nominated
Premios Feroz	Best Film Poster		Won
Neox Fan Awards	Best Spanish film		Won
Neox Fan Awards	Best Spanish film actor	Quim Gutiérrez	7th
Neox Fan Awards	Best Spanish film actress	Inma Cuesta	Finalist
Neox Fan Awards	Best kiss	Quim Gutiérrez & Inma Cuesta	8th

== Remake ==
On October 12, 2015, a Dutch remake was released called Ja, ik wil! (Yes, I do!). It starred Elise Schaap and Martijn Lakemeier.

== See also ==
- List of Spanish films of 2013
