= Living Is Easy with Eyes Closed =

- Theatrical release poster
- Spanish: Vivir es fácil con los ojos cerrados
- Directed by: David Trueba
- Written by: David Trueba
- Produced by: Cristina Huete
- Starring: Javier Cámara; Natalia de Molina; Francesc Colomer
- Cinematography: Daniel Vilar
- Edited by: Marta Velasco
- Music by: Pat Metheny
- Release dates: 23 September 2013 (Zinemaldia); 31 October 2013 (Spain)
- Running time: 105 minutes
- Country: Spain
- Languages: Spanish; English

Living Is Easy with Eyes Closed (Spanish: Vivir es fácil con los ojos cerrados) is a 2013 Spanish road comedy-drama film written and directed by David Trueba, and starring Javier Cámara, Natalia de Molina, and Francesc Colomer. The film's title comes from a lyric in the Beatles' song "Strawberry Fields Forever".

The film won six Goya Awards, including Film, Director, Original Screenplay, and Actor. It was selected as the Spanish entry for the Best Foreign Language Film at the 87th Academy Awards, but was not nominated.

== Plot ==
In 1966 John Lennon is in the midst of an existential crisis in which he's considering leaving the Beatles for good. Trying to launch a career in acting, he travels to Almeria in southern Spain to film Richard Lester's anti-war black comedy How I Won the War.

Antonio, a schoolteacher of English and die-hard fan of the Liverpool quartet, decides to go on a road trip from Albacete to Almería in the hope of meeting Lennon. He uses the Beatles' lyrics to teach English and he has an unusual request.

On the way Antonio crosses paths with Belén, who's escaping from forced seclusion by her family and by Spanish society at the time. At 20, she's running from something. The pair come across Juanjo, a 16 year-old teen, who's simply run away from home, rebelling from his conservative, intolerant and inflexible father.

Neither young person has a definitive goal, so happily accompany the schoolteacher on his mission to Almeria. Arriving, Juanjo initially says his goodbyes, wandering down the beach. Antonio convinces Belén to rest a bit in his room, while he sorts out a job for Juanjo at the café.

Returning to the room, Belèn had napped and Antonio point blank asks her how many months she is. Based on his keen observation skills, he deduces her pregnancy. As she sheds some tears, he offers to pay for her room, and he gets himself another.

Later, in the café, Antonio and Belén are having dinner when a big local farmer comes in. He constantly teases and bullies Juanjo over his hair, insisting he looks like a female. The café owner Ramón tells them his story. Originally from Catalonia, he met an Italian woman who followed him to Almeria for the sun. They had Bruno, a son who is handicapped, who he takes care of as she returned to Italy.

Juanjo is shown his room at the back of the cafè and Antonio and Belèn head off to their corresponding rooms. Waking early, they head off to the film location, but the Guardia Civil won't let them on set without an invitation.

The unlikely trio find a way onto set, and Antonio convinces Lennon to start including lyrics with their records. Afterwards, they go to a beach and have sardines while he excitedly tells them how friendly John was with him, sharing with him the yet untitled lyrics to Strawberry Fields Forever and even marijuana cookies.

On the road, they come across the farmer who had beaten up Juanjo, and Antonio unsuccessfully tries to get him to apologise. He encourages the two young people to not let fear stop them or let someone take away their dignity, to follow their dreams and look for their own freedoms.

Upon their return to the café, Juanjo's dad is waiting for them. Juanjo convinces Belén and his father to take her with them to Madrid, as he insists she can live on her own terms there and he can help her get hairdressing work.

As Antonio drives out of town, passing by the unrepentant farmer's tomato plot, he drives through the plants, gleefully singing, 'Help!'.

== Cast ==
- Javier Cámara as Antonio
- Natalia de Molina as Belén
- Francesc Colomer as Juanjo
- Jorge Sanz as Juanjo's father
- Ramon Fontserè
- Ariadna Gil

== Reception ==
Living Is Easy with Eyes Closed received positive reviews from film critics. It holds a 94% approval rating on review aggregator website Rotten Tomatoes based on sixteen reviews, with an average rating of 7.9/10.

Stephen Farber of The Hollywood Reporter wrote that the film "offers a lovely evocation of Spain as well as a touching tribute to an unforgettable moment in time when the Beatles seemed to offer brand new possibilities". Dennis Harvey of Variety deemed the film to be a "leisurely, pleasing seriocomedy" about a middle-aged Beatles fanatic's quest in 1966 Spain. Javier Cortijo of Cinemanía rated the film 3½ out of 5 stars, underscoring as a verdict that "despite the thick accents, everything sounds crystal clear and the songs talk about us".

=== Accolades ===
Year	Award	Category	Nominee(s)	Result	Ref.
2014	1st Feroz Awards	Best Comedy Film		Nominated	
2014	1st Feroz Awards	Best Director	David Trueba	Won	
2014	1st Feroz Awards	Best Screenplay	David Trueba	Won	
2014	1st Feroz Awards	Best Main Actor	Javier Cámara	Nominated	
2014	1st Feroz Awards	Best Supporting Actress	Natalia de Molina	Nominated	
2014	1st Feroz Awards	Best Original Soundtrack	Pat Metheny	Nominated	
2014	28th Goya Awards	Best Film		Won	
2014	28th Goya Awards	Best Director	David Trueba	Won	
2014	28th Goya Awards	Best Actor	Javier Cámara	Won	
2014	28th Goya Awards	Best New Actress	Natalia de Molina	Won	
2014	28th Goya Awards	Best Original Screenplay	David Trueba	Won	
2014	28th Goya Awards	Best Original Score	Pat Metheny	Won	
2014	28th Goya Awards	Best Costume Design	Lala Huete	Nominated	

== See also ==
- List of Spanish films of 2013
- List of submissions to the 87th Academy Awards for Best Foreign Language Film
- List of Spanish submissions for the Academy Award for Best Foreign Language Film
