= Witching & Bitching =

- Film poster
- Spanish: Las brujas de Zugarramurdi
- Directed by: Álex de la Iglesia
- Written by: Jorge Guerricaechevarría; Álex de la Iglesia
- Produced by: Enrique Cerezo; Vérane Frédiani; Franck Ribière; Sheila Siguero
- Starring: Hugo Silva; Mario Casas; Pepón Nieto; Carolina Bang; Terele Pávez; Jaime Ordóñez; Santiago Segura; Carlos Areces; Secun de la Rosa; Macarena Gómez; Gabriel Ángel Delgado; Carmen Maura
- Cinematography: Kiko de la Rica
- Edited by: Pablo Blanco
- Music by: Joan Valent
- Production companies: Enrique Cerezo Producciones Cinematográficas S.A.; La Ferme! Productions
- Distributed by: Universal Pictures
- Release dates: 14 September 2013 (TIFF); 27 September 2013 (Spain)
- Running time: 114 minutes
- Country: Spain
- Language: Spanish

Witching & Bitching (Spanish: Las brujas de Zugarramurdi; transl. 'The Witches of Zugarramurdi') is a 2013 Spanish comedy horror film directed and co-written by Álex de la Iglesia. It stars Hugo Silva, Mario Casas, and Carmen Maura. It won the most awards at the 28th Goya Awards with eight wins out of ten nominations, primarily in technical categories.

== Plot ==
The film opens with two men, José and Antonio robbing a pawn shop in Madrid. Antonio is unhappy that José has brought his son Sergio along on the heist and is even unhappier that the child is participating with them, as this puts both him and them at risk. The robbery turns sour and several people die in the resulting gunfire. The men hijack a taxi and stow its unwilling passenger in the trunk, then force the driver, Manuel, to drive north with the intent to flee to France.

The group is followed by Sergio's mother and José's ex Silvia as well as two police investigators Pacheco and Calvo, who are tracking Silvia. The men end up in Zugarramurdi, Navarre, where they come across a group of cannibalistic witches led by Graciana, whose mother Maritxu tries to cook Sergio in her oven. They manage to escape the witches but are forced to turn back, and are swiftly captured by the witches.

Silvia manages to find the witches' house, enlisting the help of the cops to break into the house. José, Antonio, and Manuel end up escaping in the ensuing chaos, however Silvia and the two cops are captured, with Silvia turned into a witch with the use of tainted toad juice. The three men are captured by the witches except for José, who survives only through the intervention of Graciana's daughter Eva, who has become infatuated with him. She demands that he leave with her right away, yet José refuses to leave his son behind. With help from Eva's brother Luismi, José finds his way to the ritual chamber. Along the way they free Eva, who had been buried alive by her mother for her betrayal.

Already in the chamber, Luismi and José are witness to Antonio, Manuel, Pacheco, and Calvo slowly burning in a pyre and the emergence of Graciana's goddess, a grotesque gargantuan woman resembling a fertility statue. The goddess devours Sergio, who passes through the giant and emerges alive. José confronts the witches with the help of Eva, who manages to cause the goddess's destruction, and José manages to escape the chaos with Sergio, Eva, and the other men. One month José and Eva are shown to be a couple raising Sergio, who is growing into his powers, yet Silvia, Graciana, and Maritxu are shown to be all alive and are content to wait for the couple to grow discontent with their happiness.

== Cast ==
- Hugo Silva as José
- Mario Casas as Antonio
- Pepón Nieto as Calvo
- Carolina Bang as Eva
- Terele Pávez as Maritxu
- Jaime Ordóñez as Manuel
- Gabriel Ángel Delgado as Sergio
- Santiago Segura as Miren
- Macarena Gómez as Silvia
- Secun de la Rosa as Pacheco
- Javier Botet as Luismi
- Enrique Villén as The Social Outcast
- Carlos Areces as Conchi
- Manuel Tallafé as The Badajoz man
- María Barranco as Elderly woman
- Carmen Maura as Graciana

== Release ==
Distributed by Universal Pictures International Spain, the film was theatrically released in Spain on 27 September 2013, opening with €1,236,390 in its debut weekend (a 21% share of the entire box office).

== Reception ==
On Rotten Tomatoes the film holds a rating of 84% based on 31 reviews. The site's the consensus states: "Dark, nasty, and delightfully subversive, Witching and Bitching is gross-out genre fun with a heaping helping of warped comedy for good measure". On Metacritic it has a score of 73% based on reviews from 10 critics.

== Accolades ==
Year	Award	Category	Nominee(s)	Result	Ref.
2014	1st Feroz Awards	Best Comedy Film		Nominated	
2014	28th Goya Awards	Best Original Score	Joan Valent	Nominated	
2014	28th Goya Awards	Best Supporting Actress	Terele Pávez	Won	
2014	28th Goya Awards	Best Production Supervision	Carlos Bernases	Won	
2014	28th Goya Awards	Best Cinematography	Kiko de la Rica	Nominated	
2014	28th Goya Awards	Best Editing	Pablo Blanco	Won	
2014	28th Goya Awards	Best Art Direction	Arturo García "Biaffra", José Luis Arrizabalaga "Arri"	Won	
2014	28th Goya Awards	Best Costume Design	Francisco Delgado López	Won	
2014	28th Goya Awards	Best Makeup and Hairstyles	María Dolores Gómez Castro, Javier Hernández Valentín, Pedro Rodríguez "Pedrati", Francisco J. Rodríguez Frías	Won	
2014	28th Goya Awards	Best Sound	Charly Schmukler, Nicolás de Poulpiquet	Won	
2014	28th Goya Awards	Best Special Effects	Juan Ramón Molina, Ferran Piquer	Won	
2014	1st Platino Awards	Best Ibero-American Film		Nominated	
2014	1st Platino Awards	Best Original Score	Joan Valent	Nominated	
2014	1st Fénix Awards	Best Costume Design	Paco Delgado	Nominated	
2014	1st Fénix Awards	Best Art Direction	José Luis Arrizabalaga, Arturo García	Won	
2014	1st Fénix Awards	Best Sound	Carlos Schmukler, Nicolás de Poulpiquet	Nominated	
2014	1st Fénix Awards	Best Music	Joan Valent	Won	
2014	1st Fénix Awards	Best Editing	Pablo Blanco	Nominated	

== See also ==
- List of films about witchcraft
- List of Spanish films of 2013
- Basque witch trials
