= Scorpion in Love =

2013 Spanish romantic drama film

- Film poster
- Spanish: Alacrán enamorado
- Directed by: Santiago A. Zannou
- Screenplay by: Carlos Bardem; Santiago A. Zannou
- Based on: Alacrán enamorado by Carlos Bardem
- Produced by: Álvaro Longoria
- Starring: Álex González; Miguel Ángel Silvestre; Carlos Bardem; Judith Diakhate; Javier Bardem
- Cinematography: Juanmi Azpiroz
- Edited by: Fernando Franco; Jaume Martí
- Music by: Wolfrank Zannou
- Production company: Morena Films
- Distributed by: Alta Films
- Release date: 12 April 2013
- Running time: 100 minutes
- Country: Spain
- Language: Spanish

Scorpion in Love (Spanish: Alacrán enamorado) is a 2013 Spanish romantic thriller film directed by Santiago A. Zannou and starring Álex González, Miguel Ángel Silvestre, Carlos Bardem, Judith Diakhate and Javier Bardem. It is based on the novel of the same name by Carlos Bardem, who also wrote the screenplay with Zannou.

== Plot ==
Julián, Asterix and Luis belong to a neo-Nazi ideology group led by Solís. Together with other members of the group, they attack everything considered the enemy with threats and beatings. Julián frequents Pedro's gym and asks him to teach him to box. Carlomonte distrusts Julián but starts training him. Alyssa, a young mulatto with whom Julián falls in love, also works at the gym. His love for Alyssa and boxing make Julián begin to change, something that his friend Luis is not willing to accept.

== Cast ==
- Álex González as Julián "Alacrán" López
- Miguel Ángel Silvestre as Luis
- Carlos Bardem as Carlomonte
- Judith Diakhate as Alyssa
- Hovik Keuchkerian as Pedro
- Javier Bardem as Solís
- Luis Mottola as Speaker

== Production ==
The film is a Morena Films (Álvaro Longoria) production, with the participation of TVE, Cosmopolitan Channel and Canal+ España.

== Release ==
Distributed by Alta Films, Scorpion in Love was theatrically released in Spain on 12 April 2013.

== Accolades ==
Year	Award	Category	Nominee(s)	Result	Ref.
2014	28th Goya Awards	Best Adapted Screenplay	Carlos Bardem, Santiago A. Zannou	Nominated	
2014	28th Goya Awards	Best Supporting Actor	Carlos Bardem	Nominated	
2014	28th Goya Awards	Best New Actor	Hovik Keuchkerian	Nominated	
2014	28th Goya Awards	Best Art Direction	Llorenç Miquel	Nominated	
2014	23rd Actors and Actresses Union Awards	Best Film Actor in a Leading Role	Álex González	Nominated	
2014	23rd Actors and Actresses Union Awards	Best Film Actor in a Secondary Role	Carlos Bardem	Nominated	
2014	23rd Actors and Actresses Union Awards	Best Film Actor in a Minor Role	Miguel Ángel Silvestre	Nominated	
2014	23rd Actors and Actresses Union Awards	Best New Actor	Hovik Keuchkerian	Won	

== See also ==
- List of Spanish films of 2013
