= I'm So Excited! =

2013 film by Pedro Almodóvar

- Theatrical release poster
- Spanish: Los amantes pasajeros
- Directed by: Pedro Almodóvar
- Written by: Pedro Almodóvar
- Produced by: Agustín Almodóvar; Esther García
- Starring: Antonio de la Torre; Hugo Silva; Miguel Ángel Silvestre; Laya Martí; Javier Cámara; Carlos Areces; Raúl Arévalo; José María Yazpik; Guillermo Toledo; José Luis Torrijo; Lola Dueñas; Cecilia Roth; Blanca Suárez
- Cinematography: José Luis Alcaine
- Edited by: José Salcedo
- Music by: Alberto Iglesias
- Production company: El Deseo
- Distributed by: Warner Bros. España
- Release date: 8 March 2013 (Spain)
- Running time: 90 minutes
- Country: Spain
- Language: Spanish
- Box office: $21.2 million

I'm So Excited! is a 2013 Spanish comedy film written and directed by Pedro Almodóvar, and starring Javier Cámara, Cecilia Roth, Lola Dueñas, and Raúl Arévalo. Its original Spanish title, Los amantes pasajeros, meaning "The fleeting lovers". The narrative is set almost entirely on an airplane. Almodóvar describes it as "a light, very light comedy". The film received mixed reviews, earning a worldwide gross of more than US$21.2 million.

== Plot ==
Ground technician León removes the chocks from the wheels of an Airbus A340 for Peninsula Flight 2549 bound for Mexico City. He waves to his wife Jessi, who is towing a luggage cart across the tarmac. The distraction causes her to crash into another ground technician who was checking Twitter. León checks on his wife to make sure she is okay, and she reveals that she is pregnant.

On board the aircraft, a flight attendant drugs all the passengers in Economy class with a muscle relaxant. She also sedates herself and the other flight attendants in Economy. First Class is tended to by Joserra, Fajardo and Ulloa. They take shots of tequila as they prepare service for the passengers and the cockpit. One of the first-class passengers, Bruna, observes that the Economy passengers are asleep, and she visits the cockpit. She informs Joserra, Captain Alex Acero and co-pilot Benito Morón that she is a psychic and a virgin.

Bruna makes vaguely ominous warnings about the flight. Joserra asks her if they will all die. Bruna does not think so, because she retches whenever death is imminent. Benito changes his drink order from wine to tequila at Bruna's news. Two more passengers from First Class come to the cockpit: Norma Boss and Infante. Norma is outraged at Peninsula's treatment of its passengers, particularly the fact that the First Class attendants are not serving the passengers. She is organizing a complaint against the airline. During her visit, Joserra reveals that he is the captain's lover, but with two daughters, aged 11 and 13, the captain is reluctant to come out of the closet and leave his wife. The co-pilot admits that he tried giving fellatio to the captain to see if he was gay, but he retched from the experience.

Mr. Más, another First Class passenger, visits the cockpit to offer his help, because he knows that something is wrong with the plane. León forgot to clear all the chocks after Jessi's accident, and one of them has gotten tangled up with the landing gear. The plane will not be able to land with its wheels down.

When Norma discovers that the Economy passengers have been drugged, she becomes more determined to lodge a formal complaint. She wakes a sleeping passenger, Ricardo Galán, and asks him to sign her letter of complaint. Ricardo asks to use the phone, and he calls Alba. The plane's phone is malfunctioning, however, so everyone can hear the other side of the conversation over the cabin's speakers.

Alba has climbed onto the ledge of the Segovia Viaduct in Madrid, when her phone rings with Ricardo's call. She is relieved to hear from him, but as she tries to climb back to safety, she drops her phone. It falls into the basket of Ruth, who is riding a bicycle under the viaduct. She picks up the phone and is astonished to hear the voice of her ex-lover Ricardo. She had worked very hard to overcome the heartache of their breakup. Ruth realizes that Alba had thrown all of Ricardo's things out of her apartment window before attempting suicide. Ruth gathers Ricardo's things while Alba is taken by ambulance for psychiatric treatment.

On board the plane, the flight attendants try to distract the passengers, who know that their lives are in danger. They perform a dance routine to the Pointer Sisters' "I'm So Excited", and then they mix a batch of Valencia cocktails. One of the passengers is smuggling a drug-filled condom in his anus. He gives the flight attendants some of his mescaline, and they put it into the cocktail. Norma enjoys her cocktail and reveals that she has a thriving dominatrix practice. She is horrified to learn that she has been drugged and that one of the side effects of mescaline is sexual arousal.

The passengers act on their drug-induced sexual urges, including the passenger who had provided the drugs who sexually assaults his sleepwalking wife. Norma has sex with Infante. The Captain joins Joserra in the bathroom. Bruna goes back to economy class and loses her virginity by sexually assaulting one of the passengers who has an erection in his sleep. Ulloa performs fellatio on the co-pilot.

The plane finally gets clearance to land at La Mancha airport, which is a boondoggle engineered by Mr. Más. As they prepare to jettison the 40 tons of fuel on board, the co-pilot tells the captain that he and Ulloa 69'ed each other. The captain explains that the co-pilot is in denial about the fact that he is gay. Bruna confesses that she feels like retching, which means death must be near. She narrows the sensation down to one passenger in particular: Infante. He confesses that he is a hit man. He was hired to kill Norma by the wife of one of her clients, but refuses because he does not kill women.

The aircraft successfully makes a crash landing at the airport. Norma and Infante leave the tarmac arm in arm while he plots how he can escape from his contract and his life as a hit man. Ruth meets Ricardo with a suitcase full of his things that she recovered from Alba. Mr. Más calls his wife, who has reunited with their estranged daughter, and vows to join the reunion, even though he knows he will be arrested. Bruna and the passenger she seduced are happily walking side by side. The captain tells Joserra that he will leave his family to move in with him, but Joserra reveals that he and the captain's wife are in constant contact, and that it is not necessary to break up the family. Underneath the foam, two figures are having sex. The co-pilot's hat comes flying out of the foam.

== Cast ==
- Javier Cámara as Joserra
- Antonio de la Torre as Alex Acero
- Raúl Arévalo as Ulloa
- Carlos Areces as Fajardo "Fajas"
- Hugo Silva as Benito Morón
- Lola Dueñas as Bruna
- Cecilia Roth as Norma Boss
- Guillermo Toledo as Ricardo Galán
- José María Yazpik as Infante
- Miguel Ángel Silvestre as El Novio (The Groom)
- Laya Martí as La Novia (The Bride)
- José Luis Torrijo as Sr. Más
- Blanca Suárez as Ruth
- Pepa Charro as Piluca
- Agustín Almodóvar as Air tower controller
- Antonio Banderas (cameo) as León
- Penélope Cruz (cameo) as Jessi
- Paz Vega (cameo) as Alba
- Susi Sánchez (cameo) as Alba's mother
- Carmen Machi (cameo) as La Portera

== Production ==
Produced through El Deseo, I'm So Excited! was financed entirely by pre-sales. Filming started 9 July 2012 in Madrid. Portions of the film were shot at the decommissioned Ciudad Real Central Airport, located 200 kilometres (120 mi) south of Madrid.

== Release ==
I'm So Excited! was released 8 March 2013 in Spain. Sony Pictures Classics acquired the American distribution rights and released the film in North America on 28 June 2013.

== Reception ==
The film has received mixed reviews by critics. Rotten Tomatoes reports that 49% of critics gave the film a positive rating, based on 131 reviews with an average rating of 5.60/10. The website's critical consensus states: "Campy, frothy, and proudly absurd, I'm So Excited! represents a return to light comedy for director Pedro Almodóvar—even if it isn't quite as successful a homecoming as some filmgoers might wish." On Metacritic, it has a weighted average score of 55 out of 100, based on 36 reviews, indicating "mixed or average reviews". Eric Kohn of IndieWire noted the film's poor taste in using a lack of sexual consent as a punchline.

== See also ==
- List of Spanish films of 2013
