= Ismael (film) =

- Film poster
- Directed by: Marcelo Piñeyro
- Starring: Belén Rueda; Mario Casas
- Release date: 25 December 2013
- Running time: 106 minutes
- Country: Spain
- Language: Spanish

Ismael is a 2013 Spanish drama film directed by Marcelo Piñeyro.

== Plot ==
An 8-year old boy runs away from home to track down his father, who he has never met. It is a journey for all the characters to settle their accounts with the past.

== Cast ==
- Belén Rueda - Nora
- Mario Casas - Félix
- Sergi López - Jordi
- Ella Kweku -
- Juan Diego Botto - Luis
- Larsson do Amaral - Ismael
- Mikel Iglesias - Chino
