= Family United =

- Film poster
- Spanish: La gran familia española
- Directed by: Daniel Sánchez Arévalo
- Written by: Daniel Sánchez Arévalo
- Produced by: José Antonio Félez; Fernando Bovaira; Mercedes Gamero; Mikel Lejarza
- Starring: Antonio de la Torre; Quim Gutiérrez; Verónica Echegui; Patrick Criado; Miquel Fernández; Roberto Álamo; Héctor Colomé; Arancha Martí; Sandra Martín; Sandy Gilberte; Pilar Castro; Rodrigo Poisón; Carmen Arévalo; Teresa Lozano; Alicia Rubio; Raúl Arévalo; Lucía Fuertes; Teo Planell; Celine Peña
- Cinematography: Juan Carlos Gómez
- Edited by: Nacho Ruiz Capillas
- Music by: Josh Rouse
- Production companies: Atresmedia Cine; Atípica Films; MOD Producciones
- Distributed by: Warner Bros. Pictures
- Release date: 13 September 2013
- Running time: 95 minutes
- Country: Spain
- Language: Spanish

Family United (Spanish: La gran familia española) is a 2013 Spanish comedy film written and directed by Daniel Sánchez Arévalo. The ensemble cast features Antonio de la Torre, Quim Gutiérrez, Verónica Echegui, Patrick Criado, Miquel Fernández, and Roberto Álamo, among others.

The film stars Antonio de la Torre, Quim Gutiérrez, Verónica Echegui, and Patrick Criado. It won Best Supporting Actor (Álamo) and Best Original Song at the 28th Goya Awards, out of eleven nominations.

== Cast ==
- Antonio de la Torre as Adán
- Roberto Álamo as Benjamín
- Quim Gutiérrez as Caleb
- Miquel Fernández as Daniel
- Patrick Criado as Efraín
- Héctor Colomé as Padre
- Verónica Echegui as Cris
- Arancha Martí as Carla
- Sandra Martín as Mónica

== Production ==
The film is an Atresmedia Cine (Mercedes Gamero), Atípica Films (José Antonio Félez) and MOD Producciones (Fernando Bovaira) production.

== Release ==
The film was released theatrically in Spain by Warner Bros. Pictures on 13 September 2013, grossing €739,903 (104,974 admissions) in its opening weekend.

== Reception ==
Jonathan Holland of The Hollywood Reporter underscored in the bottom line how "shot through with a distinctive wit and flair, the title cannily shows how it's possible to straddle the mainstream/arthouse divide".

== Accolades ==
| Year | Award | Category | Nominee(s) | Result | Ref. |
|---|---|---|---|---|---|
| 2014 | 28th Goya Awards | Best Film | | Nominated | |
| 2014 | 28th Goya Awards | Best Director | Daniel Sánchez Arévalo | Nominated | |
| 2014 | 28th Goya Awards | Best Supporting Actor | Roberto Álamo | Won | |
| 2014 | 28th Goya Awards | Best Supporting Actor | Antonio de la Torre | Nominated | |
| 2014 | 28th Goya Awards | Best New Actor | Patrick Criado | Nominated | |
| 2014 | 28th Goya Awards | Best Original Screenplay | Daniel Sánchez Arévalo | Nominated | |
| 2014 | 28th Goya Awards | Best Editing | Nacho Ruiz Capillas | Nominated | |
| 2014 | 28th Goya Awards | Best Sound | Carlos Faruolo, Jaime Fernández | Nominated | |
| 2014 | 28th Goya Awards | Best Original Song | "Do You Really Want To Be In Love?" by Josh Rouse | Won | |
| 2014 | 28th Goya Awards | Best Makeup and Hairstyles | Lola López, Itziar Arrieta | Nominated | |
| 2014 | 28th Goya Awards | Best Special Effects | Juan Ramón Molina, Juan Ventura Pecellín | Nominated | |
| 2014 | 23rd Actors and Actresses Union Awards | Best Film Actor in a Secondary Role | Roberto Álamo | Won | |
| 2014 | 23rd Actors and Actresses Union Awards | Best Film Actor in a Secondary Role | Antonio de la Torre | Nominated | |
| 2014 | 23rd Actors and Actresses Union Awards | Best Film Actress in a Secondary Role | Verónica Echegui | Nominated | |
| 2014 | 23rd Actors and Actresses Union Awards | Best Film Actress in a Minor Role | Alicia Rubio | Won | |
| 2014 | 23rd Actors and Actresses Union Awards | Best New Actress | Arancha Martí | Nominated | |

== See also ==
- List of Spanish films of 2013
