= Cannibal (2013 film) =

2013 film

- Film poster
- Directed by: Manuel Martín Cuenca
- Screenplay by: Manuel Martín Cuenca; Alejandro Hernández
- Based on: Caríbal by Humberto Arenal
- Starring: Antonio de la Torre
- Cinematography: Pau Esteve Birba
- Edited by: Ángel Hernández Zoido
- Production companies: La Loma Blanca PC; MOD Producciones; Libra Film; CTB Film Company LTD; Luminor
- Release dates: 6 September 2013 (TIFF); 11 November 2013 (Spain)
- Running time: 116 minutes
- Countries: Spain; Romania; Russia; France
- Languages: Spanish; Romanian

Cannibal (Spanish: Caníbal) is a 2013 thriller film directed by Manuel Martín Cuenca, who also co-wrote the screenplay. It was screened in the Special Presentation section at the 2013 Toronto International Film Festival. An international co-production among companies from Spain, Romania, Russia and France, the film was produced by La Loma Blanca PC, MOD Producciones, Libra Film, CTB Film Company LTD and Luminor. Penned by Martín Cuenca and Alejandro Hernández, the screenplay is inspired by Humberto Arenal's novel Caríbal.

== Plot ==
Carlos is a soft-spoken tailor that hides a secret double life as a serial killer. He stalks his prey carefully and carts them off to a remote mountain cabin where he slices them up and takes a bit of their meat home with him to devour later at his convenience. Carlos otherwise lives his life uneventfully until his path crosses with the beautiful Alexandra, who tries to spark a relationship with him. Shortly thereafter, Alexandra goes to his apartment after an apparent altercation with her boyfriend. She wants to report it to the police. He eventually offers to take her to the police station. She goes missing and Carlos is contacted by Alexandra's twin sister Nina, who believes that Alexandra ran off after stealing money from their parents. Carlos offers to help Nina to a degree that makes her suspicious, but she stays with him because Alexandra's brutish boyfriend is causing trouble. As the film progresses, Carlos finds himself becoming drawn to Nina and eventually he offers to take her to his remote cabin. He decides that he will drug and murder her, but finds himself incapable of performing the task. Carlos tries to confess that he's murdered not only Nina's sister, but also multiple other women and was going to murder Nina as well, but she refuses to believe him. However, as they drive down the mountainside together, Nina deliberately causes the car to go off a steep hill. An injured Carlos finds the ejected Nina's body. He returns to his sparkless life.

== Cast ==
- Antonio de la Torre as Carlos
- María Alfonsa Rosso as Aurora
- Olimpia Melinte as Nina / Alexandra
- Joaquín Núñez
- Gregory Brossard as Boyfriend

== Reception ==
=== Critical response ===
Critical reception for Cannibal has been mixed to positive. The movie currently holds a 67% approval rating at Rotten Tomatoes based on 15 reviews, with an average rating of 6.1/10. Metacritic assigned the film a weighted average score of 69 out of 100, based on 6 critics, indicating "generally favorable reviews".

Variety gave a favorable review for Cannibal, writing "Sumptuously shot in carefully composed long takes, the film firmly keeps its butchery offscreen, and given its glacial pace and lack of overt sensationalism, it definitely ranks as a niche item — and a rarefied one, at that. But sophisticated arthouse audiences might eat it up."

=== Awards ===
In September 2014, the film won the Meliès d’Argent for the best European fantastic film at the Strasbourg European Fantastic Film Festival.
