= Antonio de la Torre (actor) =

Spanish actor (born 1968)

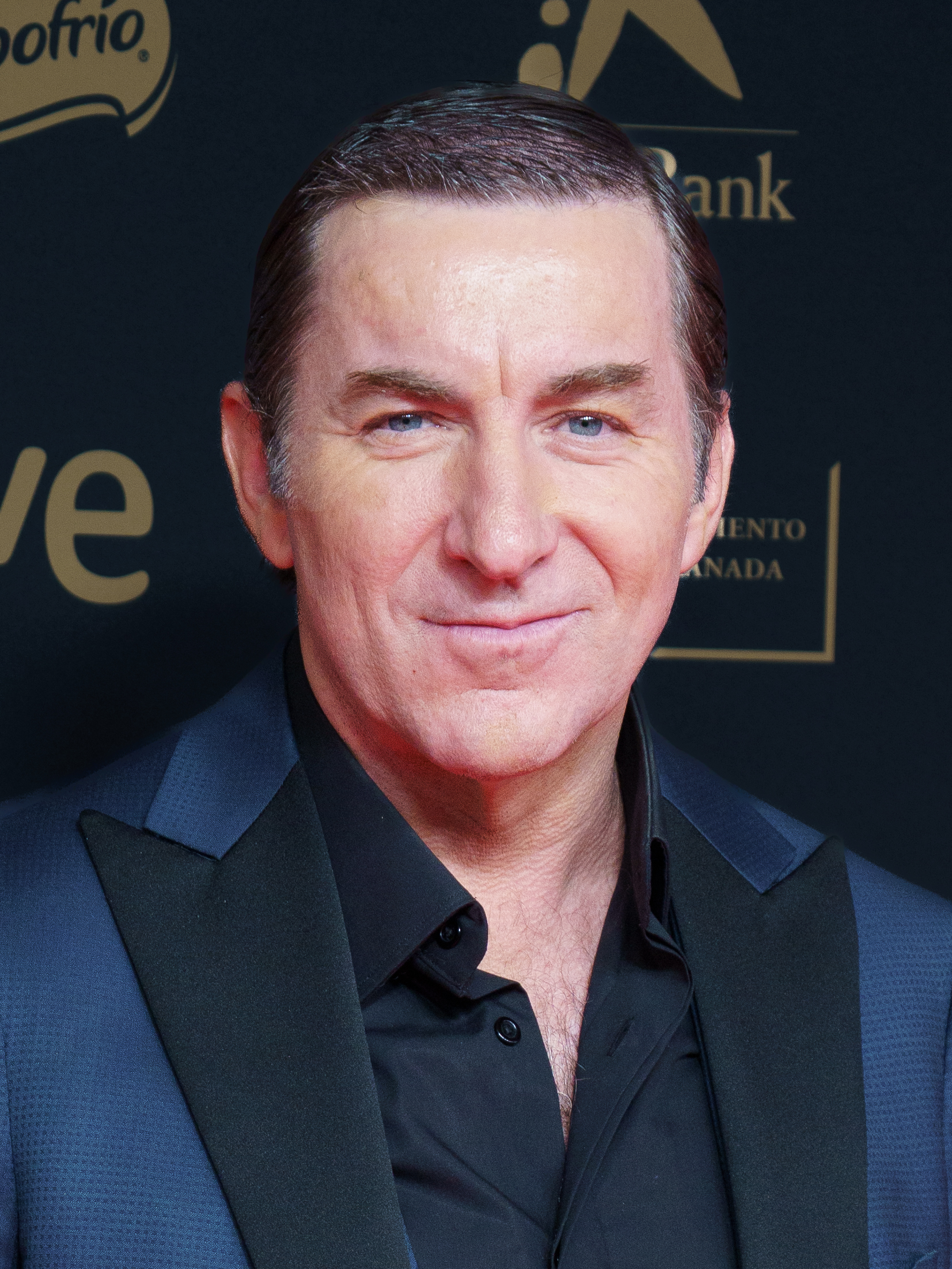
- De la Torre in 2025
- Born: Antonio de la Torre Martín; 18 January 1968 (age 58); Málaga, Spain
- Occupations: Actor; journalist

Antonio de la Torre Martín (born 18 January 1968) is a Spanish actor and journalist. He is the actor with most nominations overall to the Goya Awards. He won the Goya Award for Best Supporting Actor for Dark Blue Almost Black in 2007; whereas, he earned the Goya Award for Best Actor for The Realm in 2019. He has starred in many films directed by Daniel Sánchez Arévalo, with whom he collaborated for the first time in the short film Profilaxis (2003).

== Early life and education ==
Antonio de la Torre Martín was born on 18 January 1968 in Málaga. He studied journalism at the Complutense University of Madrid, becoming a close friend of Alberto San Juan, then his classmate at the Complutense's Faculty of Information Sciences. Sometime before earning his licentiate degree, he landed a job at Andalusian broadcaster Canal Sur, where he worked as a sports journalist. In order to reconcile his employment in Seville with his acting training under Cristina Rota and attendance to casting calls, he went back and forth from Seville to Madrid on train.

== Career beginnings ==
He started his acting career in television series such as Lleno, por favor or Los ladrones van a la oficina. He landed afterwards minor film roles in The Worst Years of Our Lives (1994, his feature film debut), You Shall Die in Chafarinas (1995), The Day of the Beast (1995), Hi, Are You Alone? (1995), and Not Love, Just Frenzy (1996). He has since developed a long career in cinema.

In 2002, he featured in Poniente, a drama film directed by Chus Gutiérrez exploring the plight of irregular immigrants working in greenhouses in Southern Spain, playing a Spanish racist foreman.

== Breakthrough ==
2006 was a key year for De la Torre. He appeared in a small role in Pedro Almodóvar's Volver (2006), portraying the partner of Penélope Cruz's character Raimunda, killed after attempting to rape Raimunda's daughter Paula (played by Yohana Cobo). De la Torre also featured in Dark Blue Almost Black (2006), directed by Daniel Sánchez Arévalo, who reportedly wrote specifically De la Torre's role for him, intending to showcase his acting talent. In the film, he portrayed Antonio, the infertile imprisoned brother of the protagonist (Quim Gutiérrez), who convinces the latter to get his partner Paula (Marta Etura) pregnant. His performance earned him a Goya Award for Best Supporting Actor, consolidated his career and gained him prestige as an actor. As a result, he left his part-time job as a journalist and fully dedicated to acting since 2007, having applied for a leave of absence from a permanent position in Canal Sur that he had just landed in June 2007.

== Established career ==
De la Torre collaborated again with Sánchez Arévalo in Fat People (2009), putting on 33 kg to portray a slimming pill salesman. De la Torre's performance as Sergio, a silly clown and abusive partner, in Álex de la Iglesia's The Last Circus (2010) earned him his third Goya Award nomination.

He played an expeditious, forceful and arrogant police agent in Alberto Rodríguez's Seville-set action thriller Unit 7 (2012).

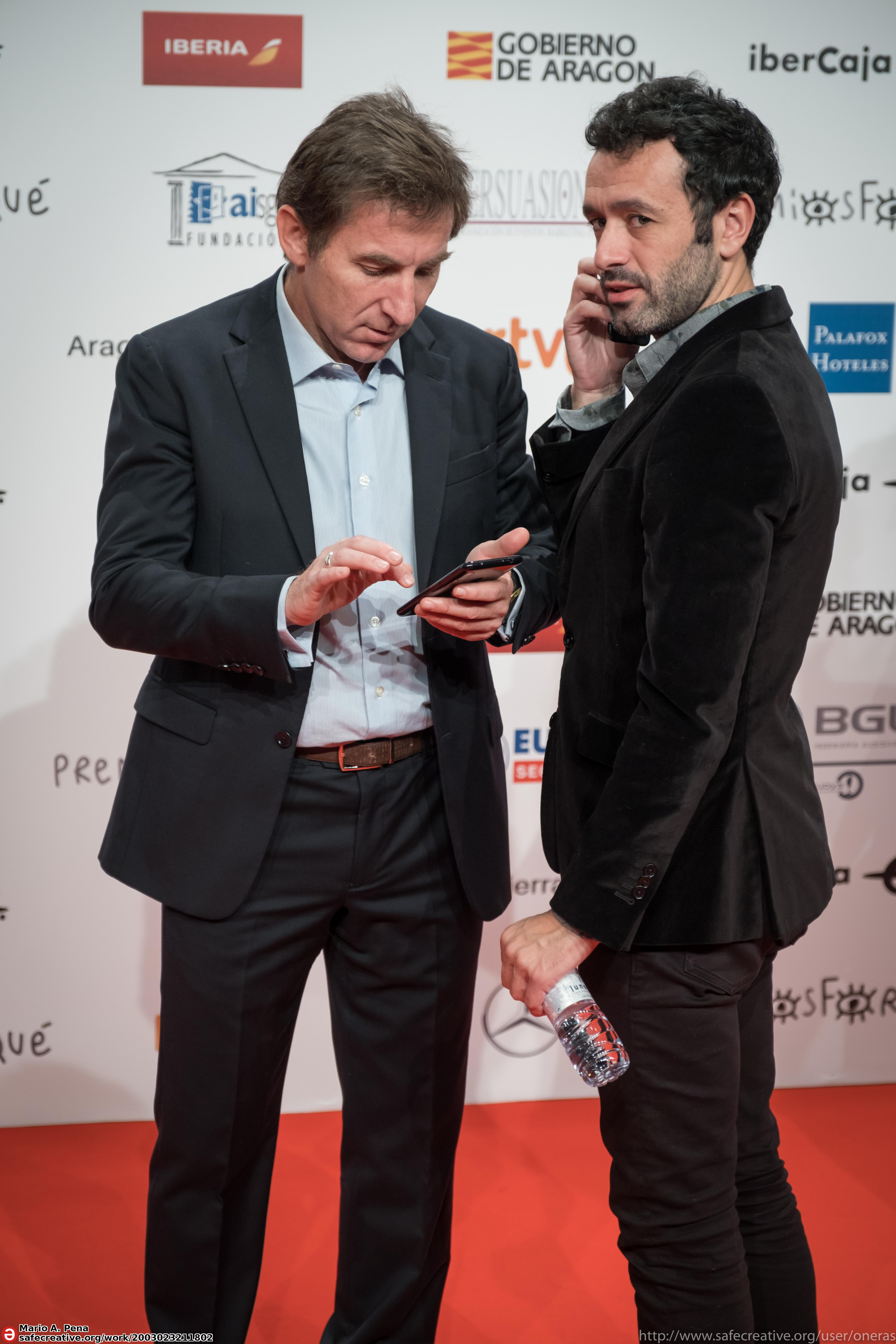
Antonio de la Torre and Rodrigo Sorogoyen in 2019

He starred as an anthropophagous tailor in Manuel Martín Cuenca's Cannibal (2013).

Another collaboration with Alberto Rodríguez, a brief supporting performance as the father of missing girls in crime thriller Marshland (2014), clinched him an additional Goya Award nomination.

He starred alongside Luis Callejo in The Fury of a Patient Man (2016), playing a quiet, well-groomed man patiently waiting to enact vengeance. Also in 2016, he starred alongside Roberto Álamo in Rodrigo Sorogoyen's crime thriller May God Save Us playing the role of a lonely and stuttering police inspector tracking down a rapist and killer of elderly women in Madrid. With The Realm (2018), a new collaboration with Sorogoyen, De la Torre won his first Goya Award for Best Leading Performance, playing Manuel López-Vidal, a well-positioned regional politician whose life crumbles upon the unravelling of a corruption case. He also landed a Best Supporting Actor nomination at the same ceremony for his role as Pepe Mujica in A Twelve-Year Night. In order to prepare for the latter role, involving Mujica's long time in captivity under the civic-military dictatorship, de la Torre lost 15 kg and worked on improving his Uruguayan accent.

For his portrayal of a man who evades the Francoist repression for 33 years hiding in his house in The Endless Trench (2019), he earned a new Goya Award for Best Actor nomination.

De la Torre co-hosted the 37th Goya Awards gala along with Clara Lago in February 2023. His supporting performance in The Movie Teller (2023), portraying a hard-working and humble Chilean man disabled in an accident, demanded De la Torre to work on his Chilean accent. In 2024, he appeared as a maquis guerrilla fighter in black comedy film We Treat Women Too Well, and in a bit part as a snooty posh parent in Father There Is Only One 4. He also lost 30 kg to play the role of a terminally ill patient in Pilar Palomero's Glimmers.

Also in 2024, De la Torre shot the thriller film Los Tigres, resuming collaboration with Alberto Rodríguez with a leading role as an industrial diver. Likewise, he landed the titular role of serial killer Juan Díaz de Garayo, aka Sacamantecas, in David Pérez Sañudo's The Harvester, set in late 19th-century Vitoria-Gasteiz. In October 2025, he was reported to have joined the cast of La bola negra, playing a small fatherly role in the plotline set in 1932.

== Accolades ==
De la Torre is the individual who has obtained the most Goya Award nominations in acting categories. He has been recognized by the Academy of Cinematographic Arts and Sciences of Spain for the following:

- 21st Goya Awards: Best Supporting Actor, win, for Dark Blue Almost Black (2006)
- 24th Goya Awards: Best Actor, nomination, for Fat People (2009)
- 25th Goya Awards: Best Actor, nomination, for The Last Circus (2010)
- 27th Goya Awards: Best Actor, nomination, for Unit 7 (2012) and Best Supporting Actor, nomination, for Invader (2012)
- 28th Goya Awards: Best Actor, nomination, for Cannibal (2013) and Best Supporting Actor, nomination, for Family United (2013)
- 29th Goya Awards: Best Supporting Actor, nomination, for Marshland (2014)
- 31st Goya Awards: Best Actor, nomination, for The Fury of a Patient Man (2016)
- 32nd Goya Awards: Best Actor, nomination, for Abracadabra (2017) and Best Supporting Actor, nomination, for The Motive (2017)
- 33rd Goya Awards: Best Actor, win, for The Realm (2018) and Best Supporting Actor, nomination, for A Twelve-Year Night (2018)
- 34th Goya Awards: Best Actor, nomination, for The Endless Trench (2019)
- 39th Goya Awards: Best Supporting Actor, nomination, for Glimmers (2024)

== Views ==
A vocal supporter of Yolanda Díaz's political project, De la Torre closed the electoral list of Sumar in the province of Málaga for the 2023 Spanish general election.

In 2026, De la Torre co-signed alongside other Spanish artists a text urging the United Nations and the governments of the world to actively work towards the release from prison of Palestinian leader Marwan Barghouti.
