= María Molins =

Spanish actress

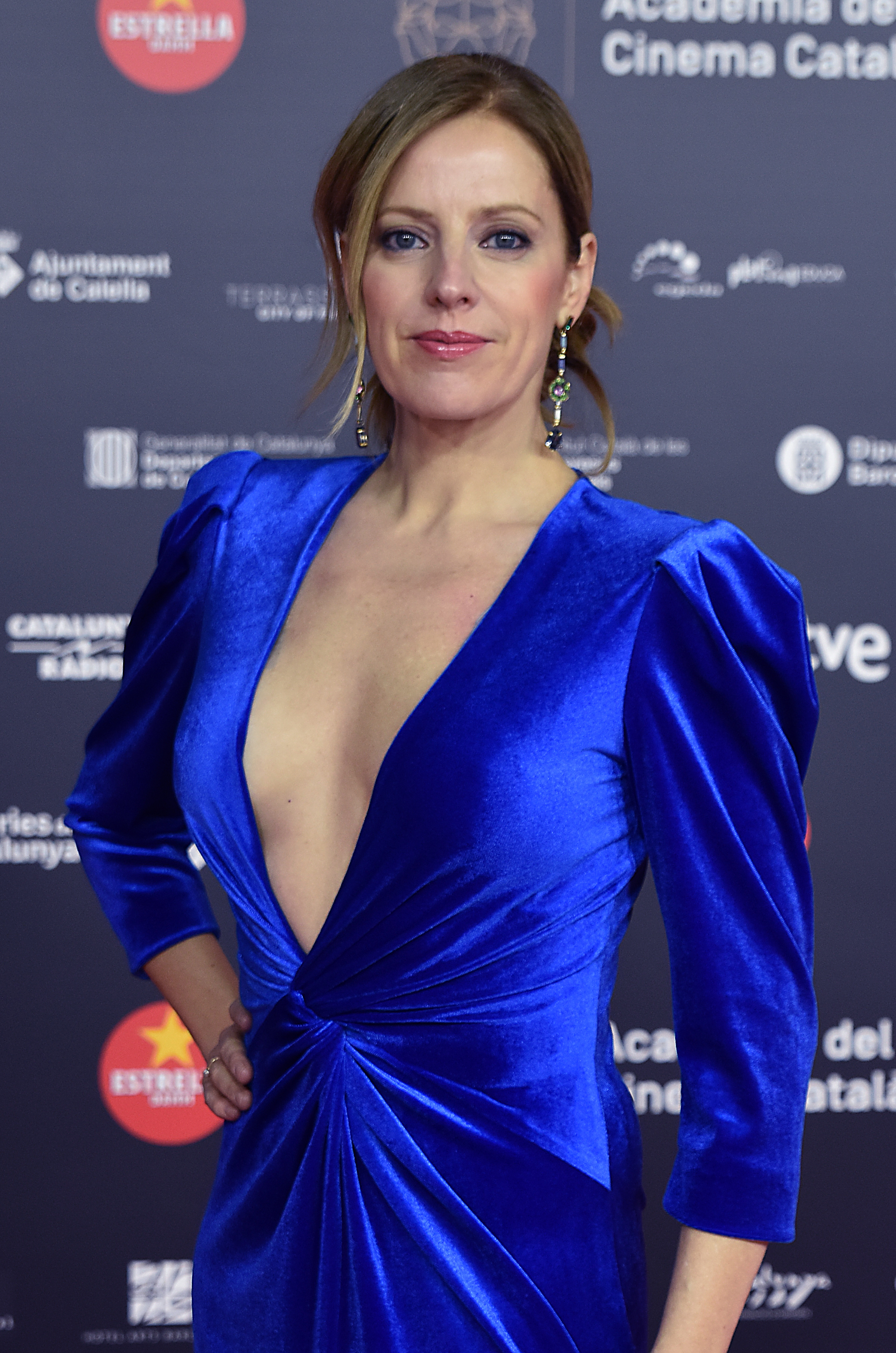
- María Molins at the Gaudí Awards 2021
- Born: Barcelona, Spain; 14 February 1973 (age 53)
- Occupation: Actress
- Years active: 1995-present

María Molins (born 14 February 1973) is a Spanish film, theater and television actress. She has obtained two nominations at the Gaudí Awards and winning the award for best leading actress in 2013 for her participation in the film El Bosque.

== Biography ==
She began her career in theater where she has developed most of her career. Also in her beginnings she had small roles in Catalan series such as Tocao del ala and Homenots. In 2001 she joined the Catalan TV series El cor de la ciutat, where she played Isabeleta until the end of the series. As for cinema, she has participated in productions such as Todo está en el aire, Cobardes and A la deriva.

In 2011 she starred in the TV3 TV movie 14 de abril. Macià contra Companys. In addition, she also appears in an episode of the TVE series Cuéntame cómo pasó.

In 2012 she was part of the cast of the Antena 3 mini-series Historias robadas about a case of a stolen baby and the search for her biological family. she also participates in the TV movie Olor de colònia and in the TV3 Kubala, Moreno y Manchón. She also stars in the film El Bosc with Álex Brendemühl, for which she received the Gaudí Award for best female lead in 2013.

In 2013 she returned to the cinema with the film Hijo de Caín with José Coronado and David Solans.

In 2014 she joined TV3's afternoon series La Riera, where she played Àgata. She also participates in the film Seve, the movie, a biopic where she plays Carmen, la madre de Severiano Ballesteros' mother.

Since 2015 she has been part of the recurring cast of the Telecinco series La que se avecina where she plays Sandra, Enrique Pastor's (José Luis Gil) press officer.

In 2016 she was part of the cast of the first season of the antena 3 series La embajada playing Maite. She also premiered the Argentine-Spanish thriller Cien años de perdón. TShe also stars in the short film Ciudadanos by Marc Nadal.

In September 2019 she joined the fourth season of the series Servir y proteger, where she played one of the main characters, Verónica Figueras. She participated with actors such as Dani Muriel, Patxi Freytez, Juanjo Artero, Cristina Abad as Alejandro Jato.

== Private life ==
After entering the Faculty of Fine Arts, she began her career as a dancer at the Theatre Institute of Barcelona, leaving it in the 4th year to devote herself fully to what would be her vocation; to be an actress. She graduated in Dramatic Art at the same Theater Institute.

== Cinema ==
- 2018 El árbol de la sangre, directed by Julio Medem. Leading role.
- 2015 Cien años de perdón directed by Daniel Calparsoro and produced by Morena Films and Vaca Films.
- 2014 Seve, feature film directed by John Paul Davidson and produced by Stephen Evans by Renaissance Films. Leading role; Carmen.
- 2014 El vuelo de la mariposa (short film) directed by Gemma Brun produced by El plató de cinema.
- 2013 Tenemos de todo (short film) directed by Roberto Pérez Toledo produced by Fotogramas
- 2012 El bosque, feature film directed by Óscar Aibar, produced by Fausto Producciones. Leading role.
- 2011 Hijo de Caín, feature film directed by Jesús Monllaó produced by Life & Pictures. Leading role.
- 2011 Trigo, short film directed by Guy Pérez Ciurezu (produced by ESCAC).
- 2009 A la deriva, directed by Ventura Pons, produced by Els Films de les Rambles. Leading role.
- 2008 Cobardes feature film with script and direction by José Corbacho and Juan Cruz (produced by Filmax).
- 2008 The Cemetery feature film directed by James Wilson produced by Wilson Films.
- 2007 Las lágrimas del cisne, short film by J. Wilson produced by Wilson Films.
- 2005 Todo está en el aire, feature film directed by David Ciurana and Ángel Penalva, produced by Fosca Films. Leading role.
- 2005 Dusseldorf, short film directed by Anaïs García produced by ESCAC.
- 2005 Tiffany's short film directed by Carola Rodríguez produced by ESCAC.

== Television ==
Year	Title	Character	Channel	Duration
1997	Tocao del ala		TVE	TV movie
1999	Homenots	Lilian Hirsch	TVE	1 episode
2000	La vida és vella		TVE	1 episode
2001 - 2009	El cor de la ciutat	Isabel "Isabeleta"	TV3	+1000 episodes
2011	14 d’abril Macià contra Companys	Carme Ros	TV3	TV movie
2011	Cuéntame cómo pasó	Sol	TVE	1 episode
2012	Historias robadas	Sor Sagrario	Antena 3	2 episodes
2012	Olor de colònia	Teresa Roca	TV3	2 episodes
2012	Kubala, Moreno i Manchón	Marta	TV3	3 episodes
2014 - 2017	La Riera	Àgata Puig	TV3	+500 episodes
2015 - 2016	La que se avecina	Sandra	Telecinco	9 episodes
2016	La embajada	Mayte	Antena 3	11 episodes
2017	Vida privada	Rosa Trenor	TVE	2 episodes
2018 - 2019	Todo por el juego	Mari Carmen	Movistar+	16 episodes
2019	Hospital Valle Norte	Elena	TVE	9 episodes
2019 - 2020	Servir y proteger	Verónica Figueras	TVE	189 episodes
2020	Desaparecidos	Gracia´s mother	Prime Video y Telecinco	1 episode
2022 - 2024	Entrevías	Jimena Abantos	Telecinco	24 episodes

== Awards ==
- Best actress award at the Cine Fosc de Monistrol festival for the short film Lo que dejamos atrás by D. Matamoros (Zentropa Spain).
- Gaudí Awards: Nominated for Best Supporting Actress for Hijo de Caín directed by Jesús Monllaó.
- Gaudí Awards: Best Actress in a Leading Role for El bosque directed by Óscar Aibar
- Gaudí Awards: Nominated for best leading actress for A la deriva by Ventura Pons.
- Butaca Awards: Nominated for best leading actress in Les aigües encantades directed by Ramón Simó at the Teatre Nacional de Catalunya.
- TV Awards: El club de TV3 Popular vote award for the character played in El cor de la ciutat, TV3.

== Theater ==
- 2014 Purge by Sofi Oksanen directed by Ramón Simó at TNC. leading role
- 2012 Rive Gauche by Marc Rosich, directed by R. Durán at Sala Muntaner.
- 2011 Vimbodi versus Praga, text and direction Cristina Clemente at TNC.
- 2010 La música by Marguerite Duras directed by Zep Santos at Sala Muntaner, Barcelona.
- 2009 Una comedia española by Yasmina Reza directed by Silvia Munt (CDN Madrid and TNC Barcelona).
- 2008 La dama de Reus by A. Carrión directed by Ramón Simó at TNC with leading role.
- 2008 Dia de partit by David Plana. Directed by R. Durán at the Espai Lliure of Teatre Lliure, Barcelona.
- 2008 La sorra i l'acadèmia by Joan Brossa directed by Jordi Faura and Abel Coll at Espai Escènic Joan Brossa.
- 2007 Trànsits by C. Batlle directed by de M. Puyo at Sala Beckett, Barcelona.
- 2007 Arcadia by Tom Stoppard at Teatre Nacional de Catalunya (TNC) directed by Ramón Simó.
- 2007 Retalls monologue on texts by different authors premiered for "Dijous a l'Institut", theater cycle in Vic.
- 2006 Aigües encantades by J. Puig i Ferreter, leading role as Cecilia at TNC directed by de Ramón Simó.
- 2005 Fuenteovejuna by Lope de Vega as Pascuala at TNC and C.D.N. directed by Ramón Simó.
- 2004 Tío Vania by Anton Chéjov as Sonia at Sala Fabià Puigserver of Teatre Lliure directed by Joan Ollé.
- 2004 Fedra by Racine at Teatro Pavón directed by de Joan Ollé.
- 2004 Liliom by Ferenc Molnar at Sala Artenbrut, Barcelona directed by de Carlota Subirós.
- 2003 La hora en que no sabíamos nada los unos de los otros by Peter Handke directed by Joan Ollé at Mercado de las Flores at Festival Grec de Barcelona.
- 2003 L'aparador by Victoria Szpunberg at Sala Tallers of Teatre Nacional de Catalunya directed by Toni Casares.
- 2002 El pati by Emili Vilanova en la Sala Fabiá Puigserver del Nou Teatre Lliure de Barcelona directed by Pep Anton Gómez.
- 2002 Fedra by Jean Racine at Festival de Almagro, Perpignan y Grec de Barcelona directed by Joan Ollé.
- 2002 Victor o els nens al poder by Roger Vitrac at Sala Fabiá Puigserver og Nou Teatre Lliure de Barcelona directed by Joan Ollé.
- 2002 Lulú by Frank Wedekind directed by Mario Gas at TNC.
- 2001 A Little Night Music by Stephen Sondheim directed by Mario Gas at Teatro Novedades de Barcelona and Teatro Albéniz de Madrid.
- 2001 Caos dempeus by V. Olmi at Sala Versus directed by Esteve Polls.
- 1997−1998 Tempus by Comediants; directed by Joan Font at the Teatre Nacional de Catalunya (TNC).
- 1996 Work in progress by Brithgoff and La Fura dels Baus at Mercado de las Flores.
