= India (Vega album) =

Studio album by Vega
- Released: 7 November 2003
- Recorded: 2003
- Genre: Pop rock, Alternative pop
- Length: 51:18
- Label: Vale Music Spain
- Producer: Simone Bosé

Vega chronology
India (2003)	Circular (2006)

Singles from India
- 1. "Grita!" Released: 2003; 2. "La Verdad (ft. Elena Gadel)" Released: 2004; 3. "Directo Al Sol" Released: 2004

India is the first studio album by Spanish singer Vega, released on 7 November 2003 on Vale Music Spain.

== History ==
This album represents her success after having sold more than 200,000 copies of her first single "Quiero Ser Tú" (Spanish for "I Want to be Yours"), which was a task to be accomplished before being entitled to a recording contract. The album peaked at No.3 of the Spanish album charts, sold more than 150,000 copies in Spain, and was certified platinum.

The country, India, has always been an inspiration to Vega, and that is why she decided to name her album after it. All but two songs on the album, "That's Life" (Frank Sinatra cover) and "Believe" (K's Choice cover), were written by Vega. The eighth track, "Olor A Azahar", is dedicated to the city she was born in. The album also contained a hidden track, "Mi Habitacion" ("My Room").

The first single from India was "Grita!" ("Shout"), which reached No.1 on the Spanish singles charts and became the best-selling single of 2003 in Spain. It also received airplay in Belgium, Russia and the United Kingdom. Two more single were released, "La Verdad" (ft. Elena Gadel), and "Directo Al Sol" ("Straight to the Sun"). Elena Gadel, a member of the girl-group Lunae, whom Vega had met during the time they were part of Operación Triunfo, also helped with the background vocals for "Grita!".

== Track listing ==
1. "Directo Al Sol"
2. "Mi Propio Mundo"
3. "Grita!"
4. "No Necesito Nada De Ti"
5. "La Verdad" (ft. Elena Gadel)
6. "India"
7. "Believe"
8. "Olor A Azahar (A Córdoba)"
9. "Mijitita"
10. "That's Life"
11. "Un Día Normal"
12. "Mi Habitación"
