= Mugisha =

Mugisha is a surname commonly used in East Africa. Notable people with the name include:

- Cedrick Mugisha (born 1997), Spanish footballer and actor
- Frank Mugisha, Ugandan activist
- Maurice Mugisha, Ugandan journalist
- Nathan Mugisha, Ugandan military officer
- Samuel Mugisha (born 1997), Rwandan cyclist
- Silver Mugisha (born 1968), Ugandan civil engineer and business executive
