= Carme Contreras i Verdiales =

Spanish actress (1932–2020)

- Born: María del Carmen Contreras Verdiales; 4 October 1932; Zaragoza, Spain
- Died: 6 July 2020 (aged 87); Spain
- Occupation: Actress

María del Carmen "Carme" Contreras i Verdiales (4 October 1932 – 6 July 2020) was a Spanish stage, film, and television actress.

== Biography ==
Born in Zaragoza as María del Carmen Contreras Verdiales, she spent much of her life in Barcelona and Catalanized her name to Carme Contreras I Verdiales. A voice actress, she dubbed, from English into Spanish and Catalan, "E.T." in E.T. the Extra-Terrestrial and "Mama Fratelli" in The Goonies, among many other characters.

Contreras i Verdiales died on 6 July 2020, aged 87.

== Theatre ==
- 1954: La ferida lluminosa, by Josep Maria de Sagarra at the Teatre Romea in Barcelona
- 1954: 16 February. Rueda de amores by Teatre de Cambra and the Teatre Romea (both Barcelona)
- 1957: No és mai tard...si s'arriba d'hora, by Jaume Villanova i Torreblanca at Teatre Romea in Barcelona
- 1970: Els dimecres...Elena by Muriel Resnik at the Teatre Romea in Barcelona
- 1973: Berenàveu a les fosques, by Josep Maria Benet i Jornet at the Teatre CAPSA in Barcelona
- 2010: Salvem les balenes by Ivan Campillo at the Versus Teatre

== Film ==
- 1952 La forastera
- 1955 El hombre que veía la muerte
- 1961 Plácido
- 1970 El certificado
- 1977 Strange Love of the Vampires
- 1978 Serenata a la claror de la lluna
- 1980 Mater amatísima
- 1981 Dos pillos y pico
- 1983 El pico
- 1984 El último penalty
- 2001 Faust 5.0
- 2006 El perfum: història d'un assassí
- 2007 Presumptes implicats
- 2012 REC 3: Génesis

== Television ==
- 2000. El cor de la ciutat
