= Drama (Spanish TV series) =

Spanish television series

- Genre: Comedy
- Created by: Dani Amor
- Screenplay by: Dani Amor; Oriol Pérez; Charlie Pee
- Directed by: Ginesta Guindal
- Starring: Elisabet Casanovas; Artur Busquets; Júlia Bonjoch
- Country of origin: Spain
- Original languages: Catalan; Spanish
- No. of seasons: 1
- No. of episodes: 6

Production
- Running time: 25 min (approx.)
- Production companies: RTVE; El Terrat

Original release
- Network: playz
- Release: 4 February – 25 February 2020

Drama is a Spanish streaming television series produced by RTVE and El Terrat which stars Elisabet Casanovas, Artur Busquets and Júlia Bonjoch. It features both Catalan and Spanish language dialogue, with roughly a 70%–30% distribution. Originally released in RTVE's Playz in February 2020, its subsequent broadcasting run on the Catalan regional broadcaster TV3 generated controversy in Catalonia.

== Premise ==
The fiction follows África, a 23-year-old woman living in Barcelona in an apartment shared with Jordi (Artur Busquets) and Scarlett (Júlia Bonjoch) who gets pregnant but she does not know by whom.

== Cast ==
Starring

- Elisabet Casanovas as África.
- Artur Busquets as Jordi.
- Júlia Bonjoch as Scarlett.

Other

- Ignatius Farray as África's father.
- Álex Maruny.
- Carla Linares.
- Iñaki Mur.
- Paula Jornet.
- Aimar Vega.
- Eduard Buch.
- Laura Weissmahr.
- Mireia Portas.

== Production and release ==
Produced by RTVE and El Terrat and created by Dani Amor, the series was directed by Ginesta Guindal whereas Oriol Pérez and Charlie Pee joined Amor in the writing team. The series was shot with a 70% share of the dialogue in Catalan and a 30% in Spanish. Consisting of 6 episodes featuring a running time of around 25 minutes, the series premiered on 4 February 2020 on Playz, RTVE's platform dedicated to streaming content for young people.

RTVE granted TV3 the broadcasting rights of the series in exchange for the first season of Merlí. The first two episodes debuted in prime time on TV3 on 29 June 2020. The airing of the first two episodes on TV3 sparked a great deal of controversy and public debate in Catalonia, with online critics decrying the presence of the Spanish language in the Catalan public broadcaster surfaced, further increasing after the Catalan culture minister Mariàngela Vilallonga joined the critics, defending that "there is too much Castilian (Spanish) in TV3".

Series	Episodes	Originally released			Ref.
Series	Episodes	First released	Last released	Network	Ref.
1	6	8 February 2020	25 February 2020	playz	

No.	Title	Directed by	Original release date
1	"Yuri"	Ginesta Guindal	4 February 2020
2	"Quim"	Ginesta Guindal	4 February 2020
3	"Senyor X"	Ginesta Guindal	4 February 2020
4	"Eric"	Ginesta Guindal	11 February 2020
5	"Gorka"	Ginesta Guindal	18 February 2020
6	"Barbara"	Ginesta Guindal	25 February 2020
