= The Trail of the Wolf =

- Theatrical release poster
- Catalan: El rastre del llop
- Directed by: Ángeles Hernández
- Screenplay by: Ángeles Hernández; Xènia Puiggrós
- Produced by: David Matamoros; Ángeles Hernández; Roxana Ramos; Fernando Díaz
- Starring: Elisabet Casanovas; Andrés Herrera; Carles Francino; Elena Gadel; Miki Núñez; Carlos Cuevas; Lluïsa Mallol
- Cinematography: Mariano Suárez
- Edited by: Dídac Palou
- Music by: Marina Ortega Mira
- Production companies: Daruma Films AIE; Mr. Miyagi Films; Doce Entertainment; Érase una Vez Films; Aramos Cine
- Distributed by: Alfa Pictures
- Release date: 6 February 2026 (Spain)
- Countries: Spain; Argentina
- Language: Catalan

The Trail of the Wolf (Catalan: El rastre del llop) is a 2026 dystopian drama film directed by Ángeles Hernández and co-written by Xènia Puiggrós. Led by Elisabet Casanovas, the cast also stars Andrés Herrera, Carles Francino, Elena Gadel, and Miki Núñez.

== Plot ==
Set in 2050 Sitges, in a dystopian context under a Fascist government, the plot follows Sofía, returning to her hometown and finding her father about to die from a pre-programmed death caused by the vaccine Saturn25. Sofía tries to find a cure while the population riots because of water scarcity.

== Cast ==
- Elisabet Casanovas as Sofía
- Andrés Herrera as Gabriel
- Carles Francino as Martí
- Elena Gadel as Carol
- Miki Núñez as Jaume
- Carlos Cuevas as Xavi
- Lluïsa Mallol as Montse

== Production ==
The Trail of the Wolf is a Mr. Miyagi Films and Daruma Films AIE co-production with Doce Entertainment, Érase una Vez Films, and Aramos Cine. It was shot in Sitges and Sant Pere de Ribes in 2025.

== Release ==
Distributed by Alfa Pictures, the film was released theatrically in Spain on 6 February 2026. It was also programmed at Fantaspoa 2026.

== Reception ==
Quim Casas of El Periódico de Catalunya gave the film a 2-star rating, lamenting that the attempt at Catalan dystopian cinema is also "a somewhat tedious story that over-recycles situations and struggles to move forward".

== See also ==
- List of Spanish films of 2026
