= Las abogadas =

- Promotional release poster
- Genre: Historical drama
- Created by: Patricia Ferreira
- Written by: Patricia Ferreira; Marta Sánchez; Irene Niubó; Virginia Yagüe
- Directed by: Juana Macías; Polo Menárguez
- Starring: Paula Usero; Almudena Pascual; Irene Escolar; Elisabet Casanovas
- Country of origin: Spain
- Original language: Spanish

Production
- Executive producers: Nieves Fernández Blanco; Fernando Bovaira; Guillem Vidal-Folch
- Production companies: RTVE; MOD Producciones

Original release
- Network: La 1
- Release: 25 September – 30 October 2024

Las abogadas is a Spanish historical drama television series created by Patricia Ferreira. It stars Paula Usero, Almudena Pascual, Irene Escolar, and Elisabet Casanovas as respectively, Lola González, Paquita Sauquillo, Manuela Carmena and Cristina Almeida.

== Plot ==
The plot takes place in Madrid in the 1960s and the 1970s. Recently graduated in law, Lola comes across Cristina, Manuela, and Paca. After her boyfriend Enrique is detained by the Francoist secret police and died by defenestration in unclear circumstances in 1969, Lola is relentless in her efforts to bring the truth to light.

== Cast ==
- Paula Usero as Lola González
- Almudena Pascual as Paquita Sauquillo
- Irene Escolar as Manuela Carmena
- Elisabet Casanovas as Cristina Almeida
- Álvaro Rico as Enrique Ruano
- Manuel Canchal as Javier Sauquillo
- Jorge Usón as Celedonio Silva
- María de Nati as Sole
- Vicente Vergara as Sebas
- Valèria Sorolla as Margot
- Fanny Gautier as María Dolores
- Jorge Bosch as Enrique (padre)
- Blanca Parés as Dolores Sancho
- Juan Carlos Villanueva as Roda Corominas
- Alberto Jiménez as Joaquín Ruiz-Giménez
- Ignacio Mateos as Pedro Patiño

== Production ==
Created by Patricia Ferreira, the series was originally developed for Movistar Plus+ under the title Flores de hierro. Marta Sánchez, Irene Niubó, and Virginia Yagüe also participated in writing duties. Las abogadas was produced by RTVE and MOD Producciones. It was executively produced by Nieves Fernández Blanco (on behalf of RTVE) and Fernando Bovaira and Guillem Vidal-Folch (on behalf of MOD Producciones). The episodes were directed by Juana Macías and Polo Menárguez. Shooting locations included Madrid, Toledo, Segovia, Leganés, and Hoyo de Manzanares.

== Release ==
The series was presented at the Vitoria-based FesTVal in September 2024. RTVE initially set a 18 September 2024 debut date on La 1, but postponed it to 25 September to give its daily series Valle salvaje a prime-time premiere ahead of its arrival in the afternoon slot.

The first episode earned a 13.3% audience share and 1.291 million viewers.

== Accolades ==
Year	Award	Category	Nominee(s)	Result	Ref.
2024	30th Forqué Awards	Best Series		Nominated	
2025	26th Iris Awards	Best Direction — Fiction	Juana Macías, Polo Menárguez	Nominated	
2025	80th CEC Medals	Best Ensemble Cast in a Series		Nominated	
2025	33rd Actors and Actresses Union Awards	Best Television Actor in a Minor Role	Jorge Usón	Won	

== See also ==
- 2024 in Spanish television
- 1977 Atocha massacre
- Proceso 1001
