= Vega (singer) =

Spanish singer-songwriter

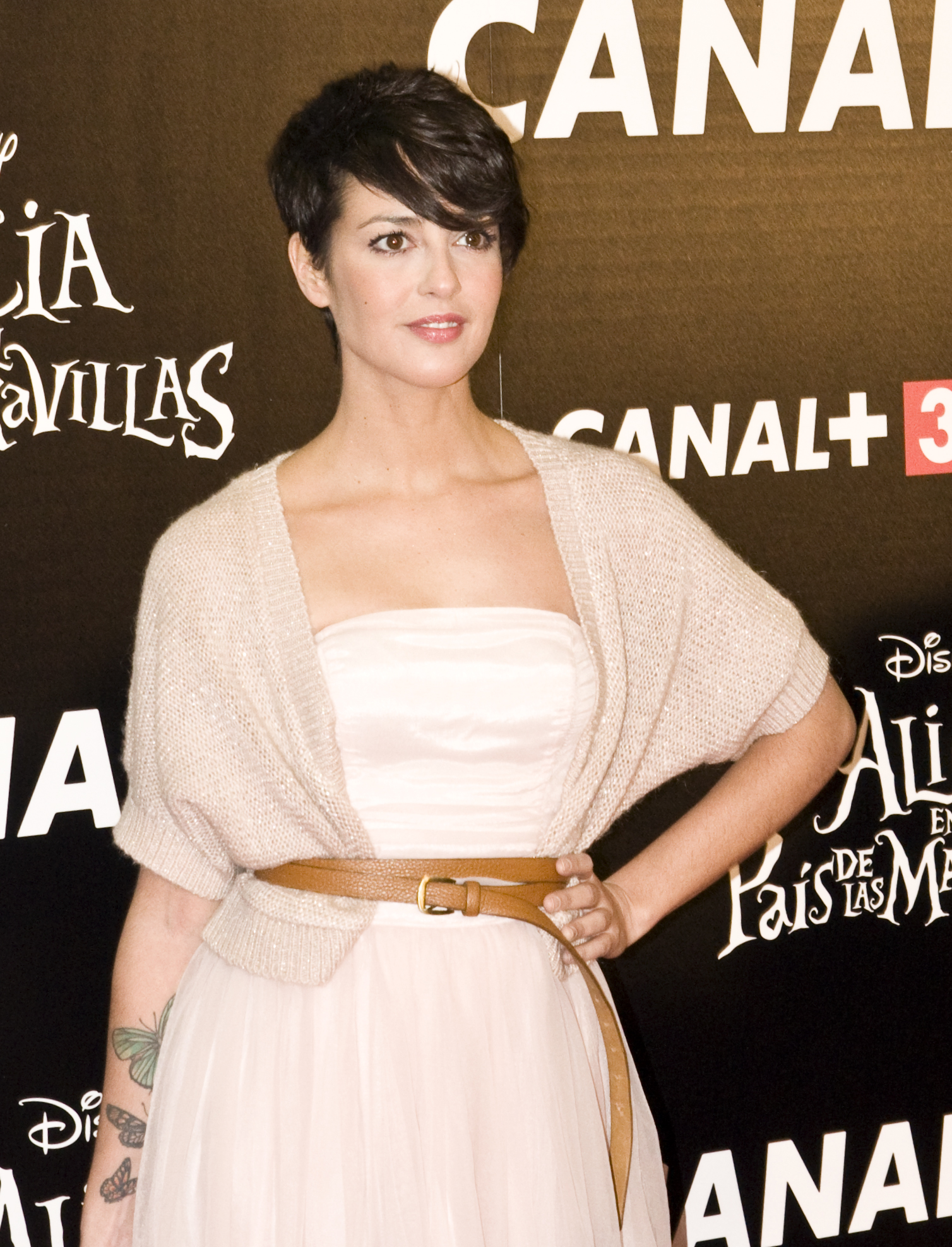
- Vega at Alice in Wonderland premiere in 2010

Background information
- Born: Mercedes Mígel Carpio; 18 February 1979 (age 46); Córdoba, Spain
- Genres: Pop rock, acoustic, alternative pop
- Occupations: Singer, songwriter, actress
- Instrument: Guitar
- Years active: 2002–present
- Labels: Universal Music Group
- Website: http://www.vegaoficial.com/

Mercedes Mígel Carpio (born 18 February 1979, in Córdoba, Spain), better known as Vega, is a Spanish singer-songwriter.

Her interest in music started when she was a child. She studied Advertising and Public Relations in Segovia, where she also worked as a waitress. She left her university career to be a contestant in Operación Triunfo 2002, her springboard to fame. Her musical style can be defined as the classical Spanish canción de autor or singer-songwriter, but it shows influences of Frank Sinatra, K's Choice and Los Planetas.

== Career ==
Vega did reasonably well in Operacion Triunfo, but was not one of the finalists. At the end of the series, each contestant not in the final was asked to release their own original 'single'. This was a smart move by the programme makers, as it introduced a further element of competition: contestants who sold more than 200,000 copies of their single won a recording contract for a debut album. Vega's single was "Quiero Ser Tú" (I want to be you) – a bewitching, unusual and sophisticated track which she wrote herself – and it sold well enough to allow her to win her recording contract. The result, India, featured 11 self-written tracks, including covers of Frank Sinatra (That's life) and K's Choice's (Believe). "Grita!" ('Shout!') was the first single and was followed by "La verdad" ('The Truth'), which was a duet with Elena Gadel, also a contestant from Operacion Triunfo. Grita! reached number 1 in Spain, receiving airplay also in Belgium, Russia, and the United Kingdom. The last single was "Directo al Sol" ('Straight to the Sun'). The album contained a hidden track, "Mi Habitacion" (My room). India was one of the best-selling albums of 2004, and went Gold, largely due to its daring and original approach to songwriting and production: for instance, the title track is a 6 and a half minute piano and voice only; and the album's final track ends with Vega stringing lines from all the earlier tracks on the album into one exhilarating, extended riff.

In 2006, after various wrangles with unsympathetic A&R in her new record company Universal Spain, Vega released her second album : Circular, with the first single being 'Una Vida Contigo' (A Life With You). All but one of the tracks ("Solo Quiero Amanecer" written by Dani from El Canto Del Loco) were written by Vega. The album stalled at #40 in the Spanish charts, although the single received huge radio play. After a period of little activity, things began to pick up. 'Una Vida Contigo' earned Vega an "Autora Revelación a Los Premios de la Musica" nomination. Her recording company then decided to re-release Circular with the subtitle "Como Girar Sin Dar La Vuelta" (How to go round without going back). The release included two new songs, including the second single "Y Llueve.." (And it's raining) and the song "Clave De Sol" (Key of G). The album also featured different artwork/graphics. Songs from the album are featured regularly on the Spanish TV version of Ugly Betty (Yo Soy Bea). Vega spent the first months of 2007 on a nationwide tour to support the new album.

Her album, Metamorfosis, was released in 2009.

== Discography ==
=== Studio albums ===
Year	Album	Peak	Sales	Certification (PROMUSICAE)
Year	Album	SPA	Sales	Certification (PROMUSICAE)
2003	India	3	110,000	Platinum
2006	Circular	25	20,000	-
2009	Metamorfosis	12	25,000	-
2011	La cuenta atrás	6	-	-
2013	Wolverines	2	-	-
2017	Non ho l'età	3	-	-
2018	Quisiera parar el tiempo (Incondicional Trilogia Parte 2)	8	-	-
2020	Diario de una nocha en Madrid	3	-	-

=== Singles ===
Year	Song	SPA	EñE	Certification (PROMUSICAE)	Album
2003	"Quiero ser tú"	1	1	10× Platinum (200,000)	Non-album single
2003	"Grita!"	1	1	--	India
2004	"La verdad" (with Elena Gadel)	--	1	--	India
2004	"Directo al sol"	--	4	--	India
2006	"Una vida contigo"	--	2	--	Circular
2007	"Y llueve"	--	24	--	Circular: Cómo girar sin dar la vuelta
2009	"Mejor mañana"	31	6	--	Metamorfosis
2009	"Cuánta decepción"	--	--	--	Metamorfosis
2010	"Lolita"	--	--	--	Metamorfosis
2010	"Nueva York"	--	--	--	Metamorfosis
2011	"Como yo no hay dos"	17	2	--	La cuenta atrás
2012	"Réquiem"	--	--	--	La cuenta atrás

=== Other songs ===
- 2002 "La fuerza de la vida (La Razón Para Luchar)" (featuring OT2)
- 2002 "A forza desta vida" (featuring OT2)
- 2002 "Un segundo en el camino" (featuring OT2)
- 2002 "Let the Sunshine" (featuring Profesores & OT2)
