= Three Days of Christmas =

2019 Spanish-language television series

- Días de navidad
- Genre: Drama
- Starring: Victoria Abril; Carles Arquimbau; Mae Aswell
- Country of origin: Spain
- Original language: Spanish
- No. of seasons: 1
- No. of episodes: 3

Production
- Running time: 53–66 minutes
- Production companies: Arca Audiovisual; Filmax; Netflix

Original release
- Network: Netflix
- Release: 6 December 2019

Three Days of Christmas (Spanish: Días de navidad) is a 2019 Spanish-language television series starring Victoria Abril, Carles Arquimbau, and Mae Aswell. The plot is set in the aftermath of the Spanish Civil War and told during across three different time periods. It was released on December 6, 2019, on Netflix.

== Cast ==
- Victoria Abril as María (older)
- Elena Anaya as Esther (adult)
- Carles Arquimbau as Mateo
- Mae Aswell as Valentina (older)
- Mar Ayala as María (child)
- Manel Barceló as Antonio (older)
- Nerea Barros as Valentina (adult)
- Andreu Benito as Ramón
- Nausicaa Bonnín as Sofía
- Alicia Borrachero as Isabel
- Berta Castañé as Esther (child)
- Gonzalo Cunill as Diego
- Antonio Dechent as Jefe Manuel
- Verónica Echegui as María (adult)
- Miquel Fernández as Juan (adult)
- Verónica Forqué as Adela (older)
- Francesc Garrido as Mateo
- Charo López as Esther (older)
- Julio Manrique as Rafael
- Ángela Molina as Valentina (older)
- Anna Moliner as Adela (adult)
- Iván Morales as Antonio (adult)
- Mariona Pagès as Adela (child)
- Sarah Perriez as Colette
- Carme Sansa as María Ángela
- David Solans as Juan (young)
- Susi Sánchez as Sofía (older)
- Carla Tous as Valentina (child)

== Episodes ==
No.	Title	Original release date
1	"Episode 1"	December 6, 2019
On Christmas morning, three young sisters decide to hide a teenage girl in their shed, risking their family's lives in the process.
2	"Episode 2"	December 6, 2019
A dying Isabel reveals a momentous secret to her daughters. Esther makes a revelation of her own. Valentina struggles with what she learns.
3	"Episode 3"	December 6, 2019
María has an announcement she'd like to share. Adela takes drastic measures to cover up the family's big secret. Esther forces a reunion with Valentina.

== Awards and nominations ==
Year	Award	Category	Nominee(s)	Result	Ref.
2021	8th MiM Series Awards	Best Miniseries		Nominated	

== See also ==
- List of Christmas films
