= Circular (album) =

Studio album by Vega
- Released: (Standard) 27 February 2006 (Cómo Girar Sin Dar La Vuelta) 26 March 2007
- Recorded: 2004–2005
- Genre: Pop rock
- Length: 43:41
- Label: Universal Music, Muxxic
- Producer: Félix Valluguera, Bori Alarcón

Vega chronology
| India (2003) | Circular (2006) | Metamorfosis (2009) |

Singles from Circular
- 1. "Una Vida Contigo" Released: 2006; 2. "Y Llueve" Released: 2007

Circular is the second studio album by Spanish singer Vega, released on 27 February 2006 by Universal Music Spain.

== History ==
After her album, India, Vega switched from Vale Music to Universal Music Spain and started working on her second album. All the songs on the album were written by Vega, except for a cover of Café Tacvba's "Eres", and "Solo Quiero Amanecer" written by Dani Martín (El Canto del Loco). The first single off Circular was "Una Vida Contigo" (Spanish for A Life with You). The album peaked at No.25 on the Spanish album charts, selling 25,000 copies.

=== Circular: Cómo Girar Sin Dar La Vuelta ===
Due to the poor sales of the album, Vega went back to the studio and reworked the songs on her second effort, and also recorded two new songs: "Y Llueve" (Spanish for And It Rains) and "Clave De Sol". Both songs, along with the reworked versions of Circular, were then released as "Circular: Cómo Girar Sin Dar La Vuelta" (Circular: How To Spin Without Turning Around) on 26 March 2007. After releasing "Y Llueve" as the second single, both Vega and the label gave up promotion for the album, and she went on to concentrate on her future projects.

== Track listing ==
=== Circular (2006) ===
1. Circular
2. Una Vida Contigo
3. Eres
4. No Hará Falta Discutir
5. Y Si Sólo
6. Hoy
7. Sólo Quiero Amanecer
8. Tan Distanto
9. Reír Por No Llorar
10. Libres
11. Berlín
12. Sin Prisa

=== Circular: Cómo Girar Sin Dar La Vuelta (2007) ===
1. Y llueve
2. Clave De sol
3. Circular
4. Una Vida Contigo
5. Eres
6. No Hará Falta Discutir
7. Y Si Sólo
8. Hoy
9. Sólo Quiero Amanecer
10. Tan Distanto
11. Reír Por No Llorar
12. Libres
13. Berlín
14. Sin Prisa
