= Santi Ibáñez =

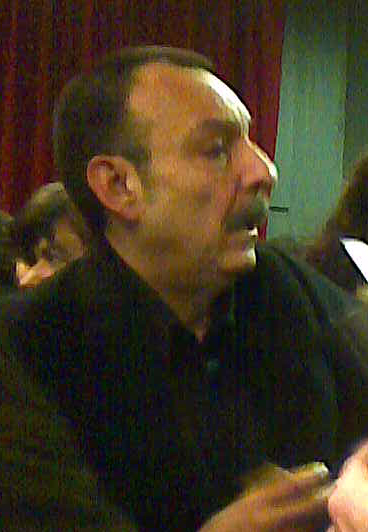
In 2011 at III Gaudí Awards

Santi Ibáñez (15 March 1958 – 29 December 2016), born in Barcelona, was a popular Spanish Catalan actor of cinema, theater and television, known for his role as Beni in El cor de la ciutat and his appearances in Temps de silenci, Estació d'enllaç, Plats Bruts, Cuéntame cómo pasó and films like Anita no perd el tren, by Ventura Pons.

Began in the world of theater with the help of Albert Boadella, with the company "Els Joglars", and worked in other companies such as "La Cubana", under the direction of directors like Sergi Belbel.

He died on 29 December 2016, due to lung cancer.
