= Merlí: Sapere Aude =

Spanish drama television series

- Created by: Héctor Lozano
- Directed by: Menna Fité
- Starring: Carlos Cuevas
- Country of origin: Spain
- Original languages: Catalan; Spanish
- No. of seasons: 2
- No. of episodes: 16

Production
- Producer: Alberto Álvarez

Original release
- Network: Movistar+
- Release: 5 December 2019 – 7 May 2021

Related
- Merlí

Merlí: Sapere Aude (Note: "Sapere Aude" is Latin for "dare to know") is a Spanish teen drama streaming television series created by Héctor Lozano that premiered on 5 December 2019 via streaming on Movistar+. The series is a sequel and spin-off of the Merlí series broadcast by Catalan channel TV3, and revolves around Pol Rubio (Carlos Cuevas), who enters university to follow in the footsteps of his idolized professor at high school, Merlí. The series was shot in Catalan and Spanish. The second and final season, consisting of 8 episodes, was filmed between August and November 2020, and premiered on 2 April 2021 on Movistar+. The series is also streamable on Netflix.

== Cast ==
Returning cast members from the previous series include: Carlos Cuevas as Pol Rubio, David Solans as Bruno, Ana María Barbany as Carmina Calduch, Boris Ruiz as Alfonso, Assun Planas as Glòria, and Francesc Orella as Merlí. The new characters that enter the series are, among others: Pablo Capuz as Rai, Pol's classmate, Azul Fernández as Minerva, María Pujalte as María Bolaño, and Gloria Ramos.

=== Principal ===
- Carlos Cuevas as Pol Rubio
- María Pujalte as María Bolaño
- David Solans as Bruno Bergeron (season 1)
- Pablo Capuz as Rai
- Claudia Vega as Oti
- Pere Vallribera as Biel Roca
- Boris Ruiz as Alfonso Rubio
- Azul Fernández as Minerva Picotti (season 1)
- Eusebio Poncela as Dino (season 2)
- Jordi Coll as Axel (season 2)

=== Recurring ===
- Martí Atance as Arnau
- Fina Ríos
- Carlos Índriago as Ángel
- David Marcé
- Zoe Stein as Sara
- Arnaud Prechac as Etienne
- Lesley Grant as Amy O'Connor
- Roberto Garcia as Henry
- Teresa Sánchez as Susana
- Silvia Marsó as Esther
- Pere Brasó as Octavio
- Blanca Martínez as Judith
- Carme Conesa as Vicky
- Assun Planas as Glòria
- Gloria Ramos as Laura
- Eva Martín as Sílvia Montoliu

=== Guests ===
- Francesc Orella as Merlí Bergeron (season 1)
- Ana María Barbany as Carmina Calduch (season 1)
- Marina Campos as a customer of the car park
- Mariano Nguema as Abdul
- Joan Negrié as Xavier Vidal
- Carles Bigorra as Jordi
- Jorge Burdman
- Jordi Pérez
- Jordi Figueras
- John G

== Episodes ==
Series	Episodes	Originally released	
Series	Episodes	First released	Last released
1	8	5 December 2019	
2	8	2 April 2021	7 May 2021

=== Season 1 (2019) ===
No. overall	No. in season	Title	English title	Directed by	Written by	Original release date
1	1	"Sapere aude"	"Dare to Know"	Menna Fité	Héctor Lozano	5 December 2019
2	2	"Fin' amor"	"Courtly Love"	Menna Fité	Héctor Lozano	5 December 2019
3	3	"El cardumen"	"Shoal"	Menna Fité	Héctor Lozano	5 December 2019
4	4	"La petite mort"	"The Little Death"	Menna Fité	Héctor Lozano	5 December 2019
5	5	"Bizitza"	"Life"	Menna Fité	Héctor Lozano	5 December 2019
6	6	"Crazy"	"Crazy"	Menna Fité	Héctor Lozano	5 December 2019
7	7	"Río"	"River"	Menna Fité	Héctor Lozano	5 December 2019
8	8	"El batalló sagrat de Tebes"	"Sacred Band of Thebes"	Menna Fité	Héctor Lozano	5 December 2019

=== Season 2 (2021) ===
No. overall	No. in season	Title	English title	Directed by	Written by	Original release date
9	1	"Un Punt Blau Pàl·lid"	"A Pale Blue Dot"	Menna Fité	Héctor Lozano	2 April 2021
10	2	"O Fortuna, Velut Luna"	"Oh Fate, Like the Moon"	Menna Fité	Héctor Lozano	2 April 2021
11	3	"La Cigüeña"	"The Stork"	Menna Fité	Héctor Lozano	9 April 2021
12	4	"Coches Inteligentes"	"Smart Cars"	Menna Fité	Héctor Lozano	16 April 2021
13	5	"Llorir"	"Crying"	Menna Fité	Héctor Lozano	23 April 2021
14	6	"Vida Normal"	"Normal Life"	Menna Fité	Héctor Lozano	30 April 2021
15	7	"Quemar el Libro"	"Burn the Book"	Menna Fité	Héctor Lozano	7 May 2021
16	8	"Maestros"	"Teachers"	Menna Fité	Héctor Lozano	7 May 2021
