= Smiley (TV series) =

- Release poster
- Based on: Smiley (play) by Guillem Clua
- Directed by: David Martín Porras; Marta Pahissa
- Country of origin: Spain
- Original languages: Spanish; Catalan
- No. of seasons: 1
- No. of episodes: 8

Production
- Production company: Minoria Absoluta

Original release
- Network: Netflix
- Release: 7 December 2022

Smiley is a Spanish romantic comedy television series based on the play of the same name by Guillem Clua which stars Carlos Cuevas and Miki Esparbé. It was released on Netflix on 7 December 2022.

== Plot ==
Set in Barcelona, the plot revolves around the love story between two men, bartender Álex and architect Bruno, who meet because of a misdirected voicemail.

== Cast ==
- Carlos Cuevas as Álex
- Miki Esparbé as Bruno
- Pepón Nieto as Javier / Keena
- Meritxell Calvo as Vero
- Giannina Fruttero as Patri
- Eduardo Lloveras as Albert
- Ruth Llopis as Núria
- Cedrick Mugisha as Ibra
- Carles Sanjaime as Ramiro
- Ramon Pujol as Ramon

== Episode list ==
| No. | Title | Directed by | Written by | Original release date |
|---|---|---|---|---|
| 1 | "Cuando Álex encontró a Bruno (Translation: When Álex Met Bruno)" | Marta Pahissa | Guillem Clua (play) | December 7, 2022 |
Hunky 32-year-old bartender Alex leaves a long message for a boyfriend who has ghosted him, but accidentally misdials the number and leaves the message with a stranger. Bruno, a movie-loving, 36-year-old architect, receives the message and calls Alex to let him know of the mistake. They end up talking and decide to meet at the bar where Alex is working, sight unseen. Alex's mother tries to set Alex up with a new worker, Ibra. Meanwhile, one of the co-owners of the bar, Vero, has decided to take a job for the summer in Ibiza, greatly worrying her business partner, Javi, who is worried about the bar’s finances. They argue, but during a drag performance at the bar, Javi (as Keena) apologizes to Vero and wishes her the best in her new job. Vero has not yet told her girlfriend of seven years, Patri, about the summer job. Patri, who’s attending the drag show, was in the audience of the drag show, storms out of the bar just as Bruno arrives, and moments after Ibra has arrived. Alex says to himself that he hopes the newly arriving patron is not Bruno because he’s not sexy, but Bruno flashes a book that the two had agreed would be used to identify him.
| 2 | "Las alas de Ícaro (Translation: The Wings of Icarus)" | Marta Pahissa | Guillem Clua (play) | December 7, 2022 |
Alex and Bruno's first conversation is awkward as Bruno overshares about his romantic past, monopolizes the conversation, and discusses how an age gap with a former boyfriend had contributed to their breakup. When Alex enthusiastically interjects about working out, something he’s passionate about, Bruno is disappointed. Bruno excuses himself and calls his friend (another architect at his firm) named Albert and tells him he thinks Alex is a cliche and an idiot; Albert tells Bruno to leave the bar and join him and his wife, Nuria, at a costume party. When Bruno returns to Alex, they end up fighting after Bruno insults the patrons of the bar calling them “posers”. Bruno tells Alex that no one like him (Alex) would ever date someone like himself. Alex says that he is sincerely attracted to Bruno, and they have sex in the bar’s storeroom. Ramiro, a friend of Alex's father, arrives at the home of Alex's mother, Rosa. They have not seen each other in 25 years, since the death of Juan, Alex’s father. They end up having a fun dinner together.
| 3 | "La fiera de mi niña (Translation: The Beast of My Girl)" | Marta Pahissa | Guillem Clua (play) | December 7, 2022 |
Bruno and Álex both wake up feeling confused about how to navigate the morning after. They both think their sex was fantastic, but neither is sure he likes the other. When Bruno prepares to leave, he momentarily fantasizes about Alex's asking him to stay longer, leading to sex. Alex similarly momentarily fantasizes about Bruno asking to stay for breakfast, leading to sex. When both snap out of their daydreams, they awkwardly fight and prepare to depart. While standing in the hallway, they connect over an old movie, and Bruno departs. At this mother's workplace, Alex receives several sexual texts from Ibra. Alex and Bruno both debate whether to text the other, and neither acts. Alex goes to Ibra’s apartment, where he is passionately met at the door. Just then, a text arrives from Bruno (just a smiley face, as is revealed in the next episode), but it goes unnoticed. Ramiro sees Alex on the street, and later goes to Alex's bar, orders a drink, and talks to Alex about making choices in life. Albert struggles at work, retreats to the bathroom, and begins to cry over his lost youth and commitments he has made. Albert's father-in-law (the senior partner at his architecture firm) reveals that Albert has been arrested after using drugs and getting in a fender bender. Patri and Vero try to reconnect after Vero tells Patri that she turned down the Ibiza job. Patri has never come out to her parents. Vero tells Patri that she (Vero) wants to be in an open relationship. They kiss.
| 4 | "Volver a empezar (Translation: Start Over)" | Marta Pahissa | Guillem Clua (play) | December 7, 2022 |
Alex and Ibra wake up in Alex's bed. (Nothing explains the relocation from Ibra's apartment to Alex's.) Alex suggests spending some time together and wanting to get to know Ibra, but Ibra very frankly replies that he is interested only is a sexual relationship and leaves. Later, Vero tells Alex to reply to Bruno's text, but when he does, he realizes Bruno has deleted the smiley face text. Alex thinks Bruno deleting the text is a sign he regretted sending it, and decides to reenter the dating app world. Vero and Patri begin exploring an open relationship, and create a joint dating app profile, looking for a threesome. Their mutual friend Flor offers to join them, and they accept. Rosa continues seeing Ramiro. She shows a photo of him to Alex, who recognizes Ramiro as the patron from the bar. Rosa confronts Ramiro about living in a hostel instead of repairing his ship (as he had told her), and Ramiro confesses to having retired and worrying about being alone. They embrace. While Álex agonizes over texting Bruno back, Bruno's co-worker, 35-year-old Ramón, surprises him with a movie-set as a Secret Santa present at work. Bruno responds cooly, but Ramon continues to flirt with him. Ramon asks Bruno to see a movie with him and surprises Bruno with a kiss. Alex, who has just arrived at the office, sees them kissing and leaves. Bruno, unaware of Alex's presence, tells Ramon that he did not share his feelings.
| 5 | "Cada oveja en su corral (Translation: Every Sheep In Its Pen)" | Marta Pahissa | Guillem Clua (play) | December 7, 2022 |
At three different celebrations, unexpected guests and revelations make for a memorable Christmas Day. Rosa invites Ibra to the family’s Christmas dinner, and Alex is surprised to see him. Ramiro and Rosa's past is flashed back to showing that Ramiro was a jealous third-wheel to the relationship of Juan and Rosa. The day after Alex's birth is when Ramiro left. When the other guests have left, Rosa and Ramiro kiss. Ramiro tells Rosa that he was, in fact, in love to Juan and have one encounter with him. Rosa tells Ramiro to leave. Outside on the street, Ibra tells Alex that he has feelings for him, and they kiss. Bruno joins Albert and Nuria's Christmas with Nuria's parents. Ramon is said to have quit the architecture firm the day after the firm's holiday party. Nuria's parents announce that they are leaving on a round-the-world trip for perhaps two years and are leaving Albert in charge of the firm. Bruno leaves a message for an undisclosed recipient saying that he would like to see the recipient. Bruno meets Ramon, the recipient of the message, and tells him that he should appreciate the person in front of him. Patri's parents arrive at the home of Patri where a Christmas dinner is being held with Javi, Vero, and Eli (a friend). Patri's parents expect to stay at the one-bedroom apartment of Vero and Patri. Patri's parents share that a former suitor will likely be visiting Patri. Vero outs Patri to Patri's parents in a spiteful attack. They comfort their daughter.
| 6 | "Un grado de separación (Translation: One Degree of Separation)" | Marta Pahissa | Guillem Clua (play) | December 7, 2022 |
Albert's daughter writes a letter in which she explains how unhappy their family life has become. Albert reads the letter just as he is about to present a very important project and abruptly leaves the meeting to return to his home to be with his family. When the caterer of the bar falls ill, Vero and Javi speak with Nuria about replacing him. Bruno and Ramon walked and talk when they approach Bar Bero. Bruno persuades Ramon to get a drink at a different spot and they are departing just as Ibra approaches; he and Ramon are acquaintances. When Alex and Bruno are supposedly introduced, they both pretend not to know each other well. When Ibra kisses Alex, Bruno kisses Ramon. Ramiro arrives, and Alex rebuffs him. Before leaving, Bruno fantasizes about getting back together with Alex. Ramiro cries to Javi, and they sleep together. Alex texts Bruno an invitation to a New Year's party at the bar. The owner of the Ibiza club arrives and tells Vero that she is still wanted to work at the new club; they make out in the storeroom. Patri's mother stops at the bar, and Vero tells her that she loves Patri. Vero returns to Patri's apartment and professes her love when another woman is revealed to have been with Patri. Vero storms out.
| 7 | "Cinco minutos antes de la cuenta atrás (Translation: Five Minutes Before the Countdown)" | Marta Pahissa | Guillem Clua (play) | December 7, 2022 |
A rowdy New Year's Eve party at Bar Bero brings everyone together for a night full of songs, Cava, grapes and - for better or worse - honest conversations. Ramon and Bruno are running late for the party and Bar Bero. Bruno arrives first and gives a present to Alex, a DVD. In the kitchen, Bruno sees Nuria working, and they talk about Albert; Nuria indicates she and Albert are separating. Albert rushes in to speak with Nuria. Albert takes to the mic on the stage and publicly tells her he loves her. They reconcile. Flor, the third member of the threesome with Vero and Patria, arrives to tell Vero why she was with Patria and accuses Vero of hypocrisy. Vero calls Patria to apologize, and Patria arrives and they kiss. Ibra tells Bruno that the invitation to the New Year's party was a mass email and not a personal one. Bruno decides to leave and starts to take his unopened present to Alex back with him when Alex stops him. Bruno argues with Alex, tells him that Alex should have replied to his earlier text, and blames Alex for their circumstances. Bruno is very unflattering to Ramon who arrives just in time to hear the insult and leaves. Ramiro visits Javi at the bar. Javi breaks it off with Ramiro.
| 8 | "El hilo rojo (Translation: The Red Thread)" | Marta Pahissa | Guillem Clua (play) | December 7, 2022 |
Patri and Vero prepare to move into their new apartment. Patria realizes that Vero and she have fallen out of love, and she breaks up with Vero as Vero cries. Ramiro decides to move on. Before leaving, he delivers a cassette with Juan's message to him. Juan tells Ramiro that he would always love Rosa and wanted Ramiro to be in his life too. Rosa then goes to Ramiro's hostel and stops him as he is leaving. Ramiro then visits Javi. At the architecture firm, Albert quits, and his father-in-law makes Ramon the new managing partner. Ibra makes a romantic dinner for Alex and invites him to take a ten-day vacation to Senegal to meet his parents. Ibra tells Alex that he is falling in love with Alex. Álex and Bruno can't seem to break the Red Thread of Fate. Alex gets into a taxi for the airport where Ibra is waiting on him. He calls Bruno, and Bruno does not hear it. Alex leaves a long message in which he confesses his deep love for Bruno and regrets that pattern of relationships he is used to. Bruno sees that Alex is leaving a message and rushes to the airport. The flight to Senegal has already left, so Bruno goes home in tears. Alex is there, and they declare their love and kiss in the street.

== Production ==
The series is an adaptation of the theatrical play Smiley written by Guillem Clua, which was performed onstage by Albert Triola and Ramon Pujol. Production company Minoria Absoluta pleaded for the series to be fully shot in Catalan, but it was shot in Spanish with the subplot involving Eduardo Lloveras and Ruth Llopis using Catalan and the actors dubbing their own voices in the Catalan dub version. The episodes were directed by David Martín Porras and Marta Pahissa.

In April 2023, Clua confirmed that a second season of the show would not be filmed.

== Release ==
Netflix released the 8-episode series on 7 December 2022.

== Accolades ==
| Year | Award | Category | Nominee(s) | Result | Ref. |
|---|---|---|---|---|---|
| 2023 | 34th GLAAD Media Awards | Outstanding Spanish-Language Scripted Television Series | | Nominated | |
