= Carlos Cuevas =

Spanish actor

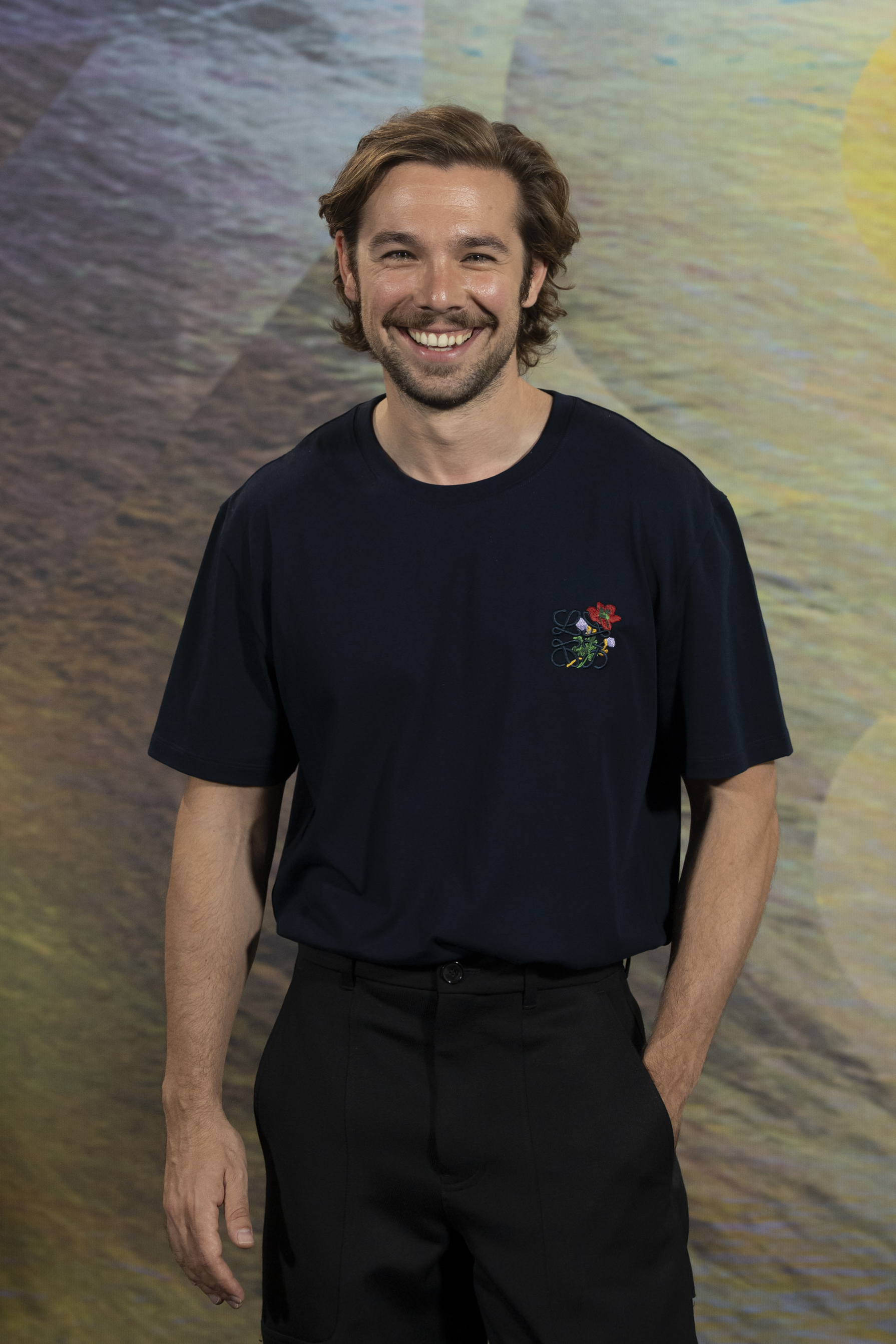
- Cuevas in 2025
- Born: Carlos Cuevas Sisó; 27 December 1995 (age 30); Montcada i Reixac, Barcelona, Spain
- Occupation: Actor
- Years active: 2002–present

Carlos Cuevas Sisó (born 27 December 1995) is a Spanish television, film, and theater actor, known for his performances in the Catalan television series Ventdelplà and Merlí.

== Early life ==
Carlos Cuevas was born on 27 December 1995 in Montcada i Reixac, Barcelona. He started acting in commercials when he was five years old. In 2002, he made his debut in the film La mujer de hielo. Since 2004, he has worked as a dubbing actor for television and radio advertising campaigns, as well as for films. He began in the television world in an episode of Trilita, a TV3 series created by Tricicle.

In 2005, at age nine, he became known to the Catalan public thanks to his role as Biel Delmàs in the series Ventdelplà from TV3, where he appeared until the series ended in 2010.

== Career ==
In 2009, he made his first foray into film, playing Dani in the film Cruzando el límite, by Xavi Giménez and produced by Filmax. In 2011, he went to the stage in Teatre Borràs to star alongside Clara Segura and Montse Vellvehí in the play Madame Melville by Richard Nelson, directed by Àngel Llàcer. In 2012, he was in the cast of the first season of Antena 3's mystery series Luna, el misterio de Calenda, where he played Tomás, with actors including Olivia Molina and Álvaro Cervantes. At the end of that year, he returned to the stage, at the Teatre Nacional de Catalunya to star alongside Albert Espinosa, Joan Carreras i Goicoechea, and many others, in the play Els nostres tigres beuen llet. Espinosa says he has created a fictitious family with the good and the best of Catalan theatre.

From 8 May to 22 June 2013, he worked again with Emma Vilarasau, Míriam Iscla, Anna Moliner, Jordi Banacolocha, Pep Planas, Pepa López, and Joan Carreras, performing in the play Barcelona, directed by Pere Riera, which deals with the Spanish Civil War, centring on the day that Barcelona was bombed by Francoist troops. In 2015, he appeared in the film It's Now or Never, directed by María Ripoll and starring Dani Rovira and María Valverde. Also that year he joined the cast of the TV3 series Merlí, where he played Pol Rubio. The series, due to its great acceptance among the Catalan public, was later dubbed to Spanish for a nationwide broadcast in laSexta.

In 2016, he made a minor appearance in Televisión Española's series El Ministerio del Tiempo, where he played a fictional successful YouTuber. In May 2016, he starred in Shakespeare's Romeo and Juliet at Espai La Seca in Barcelona, alongside Clàudia Benito, under the direction of Marc Chornet. In September of that year he once again played Pol Rubio in the second season of Merlí. In October 2016, he joined the cast of the eighteenth season of Televisión Española's series Cuéntame cómo pasó, where he plays Marcos. With his partner in Merlí, Elisabet Casanovas, he was in charge of welcoming 2017 in TV3's New Year's Eve broadcast. Cuevas continued his role as Pol Rubio on the two seasons of Merlí's spin-off, Merlí: Sapere Aude, which was released in 2019.

In 2020, Cuevas played Alonso Aldama in the three part Netflix series Someone Has to Die, created by Manolo Caro.

Cuevas starred as Álex in the LGBT-themed romantic comedy series Smiley (2022) along with Miki Esparbé.

From 20 February to 16 March 2025, he starred as Toby in L'herència (The Inheritance by Matthew Lopez) directed by Josep Maria Mestres at Teatre Lliure in Barcelona, Spain.

== Filmography ==
=== Television ===
Year	Title	Character	Channel	Notes
2003	Trilita		TV3	1 episode
2005–2010	Ventdelplà	Biel Delmàs	TV3	Main character
2012	Luna, el misterio de Calenda	Tomás	Antena 3	Supporting character
2015–2018	Merlí	Pol Rubio	TV3	Main character
2016	Em dic Manel!		TV3	Supporting character
2016	El Ministerio del Tiempo	Javier Jiménez "Nexus 6"	La 1	3 episodes
2016–2017	Campanadas Fin de Año	Himself	TV3	Co-host with Elisabet Casanovas
2017–2019	Cuéntame cómo pasó	Marcos García de Blas	La 1	Supporting character
2019	45 revoluciones	Roberto Aguirre	Antena 3	Main character
2019-2021	Merlí: Sapere Aude	Pol Rubio	Movistar+ / TV3	Main character
2020	The Idhun Chronicles	Alsan	Netflix	Main character; voice
2020	Someone Has to Die	Alonso Aldama	Netflix	Supporting character; 3 episodes
2021	Leonardo	Salaì	La 1	Supporting character; 5 episodes
2022	Boundless	Martino	La 1	Main character; 4 episodes
2022	Stories to Stay Awake		Amazon Prime	Main Character
2022	Smiley	Alex	Netflix	Main character

=== Film ===
Year	Title	Character	Director
2002	La mujer de hielo	Joan	Leonardo Bechini
2010	Cruzando el límite	Dani	Xavi Giménez
2014	Barcelona	Tinet	Àngel Biescas
2015	Ahora o nunca	Dani	María Ripoll
2019	In Family I Trust	León	Patricia Font
2020	El verano que vivimos	Carlos	Carlos Sedes
2021	Donde caben dos	Iván	Paco Caballero
2022	The Man from Rome	Father Cooey	Sergio Dow
2023	La ternura	Leñador Azulcielo	
2024	The 47	Pasqual Maragall	Marcel Barrena
2025	Wolfgang (extraordinari)	Himself	
2025	También esto pasará (This Too Shall Pass)	Santi	
2026	El rastre del llop (The Trail of the Wolf)	Xavi	
2026	La fiera	Carlos Suárez	
2026	Cowgirl	Riqui	

=== Theater ===
Year	Title	Character	Director
2011	Madame Melville	Carl	Àngel Llàcer
2012	Els nostres tigres beuen llet	Rocco	Albert Espinosa
2013	Barcelona	Tinet	Pere Riera
2016	Romeo and Juliet	Romeo	Marc Chornet
2017	Galileo	Sagredo	Carme Portaceli
2025	L'herència	Toby	Josep Maria Mestres
