= Aida Oset =

Spanish actress

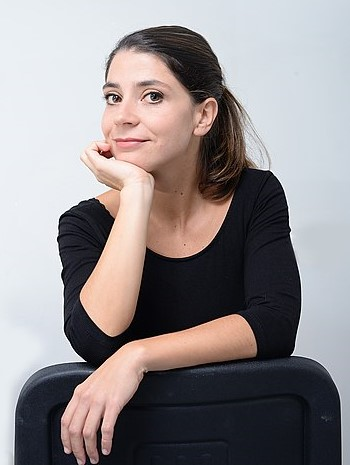
- Aida Oset in 2018
- Born: Aida Oset Vilanova; 3 September 1983 (age 43); Barcelona, Spain
- Occupation: Actress
- Years active: 2003–present

Aida Oset (Barcelona, 3 September 1983) is a Spanish television, film, and theater actress. She is mainly known for her roles in Catalan television series such as Moebius, El cor de la ciutat and Cites. In addition, she has also participated in films such as Tres días con la familia and Forasters. She is also part of the electronic pop group Nuu.

== Biography ==
She trained as an actress at the Nancy Tuñón School in Barcelona and graduated as a singer at L'AULA (Conservatory of Modern Music and Jazz of the Liceu Foundation), as well as being certified in 2017 as a Fitzmaurice Voicework teacher.

She is mainly known by the Catalan public for her participation in the after-dinner series El cor de la ciutat, where she played Eli, a vital and rebellious young woman who, together with a group of companions, occupies a historic building in the city of Barcelona that was going to be demolished to build apartments. Being such a choral production, she coincided with the great faces of Catalan television; she shared scenes with Sandra (Nausicaa Bonnín), Ka (Laura Guiteras) and Iván (Oriol Vila) mainly. Oset joined the long-lived series in the eighth season and remained in it until its conclusion.

In 2009, she participated in the film 3 dies amb la família, a drama starring Nausicaa Bonnín and directed by Mar Coll.

In 2011, she played the role of Blanca in the TV3 miniseries Ermessenda, a historical drama about Ermesenda de Carcasona, who was Countess of Barcelona and a historical figure in the history of Catalonia.

In 2012 she participated in the film El cuerpo by Oriol Paulo in a supporting role and also in the TV3 miniseries Tornarem, about the Republican exiles of the Civil War who were involved in World War II.

In theater, She has participated in plays such as Othello, Històries d'Istanbul or Mrs. Death: un diàleg amb Espriu, among others. Between 2011 and 2012 she was part of the cast of the play The Lonesome West, an adaptation of Martin McDonagh text directed by Pepa Fluvià. In 2015, she played Hero in the TeatrE Nacional de Catalunya's large hall in an adaptation of Shakespeare's classic Molt soroll per no res directed by Àngel Llàcer. The play was very well received by audiences and critics, and even hung the "full house" sign on numerous occasions.

In 2015, she participated in two episodes of the first season of the romantic comedy Dates on TV3, an adaptation of the British Dates. Oset plays Judith, a young woman who has just ended a long-term romantic relationship and for whom her sister Ona (Júlia Molins) arranges a date without her knowledge.

From 2018 to 2021, Oset has participated in the TV series Servir y proteger, Mira lo que has hecho, and in the two seasons of the Catalan fiction Les de l'hoquei. In 2021, she premieres as the protagonist of Moebius, a series created by Eduard Cortés and Piti Español and directed by Eduard Cortés. Moebius is an investigative thriller with a Nordic feel, set in a village in inland Catalonia in which Oset plays Mamen Salvat, the new math teacher who will investigate on her own the death of one of her students.

== Filmography ==
=== Cinema ===
Year	Title	Character	Directed by
2018	Ophelia, Six actors in search of a character	Ophelia	Marc Ortiz
2018	Alex y Julia	--	Dani de la Torre
2016	No quiero Perderte Nunca	Madre	Alejo Levis
2012	Frontera	Helena	Manuel Pérez Cácerez
2012	El cuerpo	Nurse	Oriol Paulo
2010	Limón y chocolate	--	Gemma Ferraté
2008	Tres días con la familia	Mar	Mar Coll
2008	Forasters	Anna	Ventura Pons
2007	Sing for Darfur	--	Johan Kramer
2003	Hypnos	--	David Carreras

=== Television ===
Year	Title	Character	Directed by	Channel	Role
2021	Moebius	Mamen Salvat	Eduart Cortés Patricia Font	TV3	Protagonist (10 episodes)
2019– 2020	Les de l'hoquei	Montse Pagès Cuesta	Patricia Font	TV3	Secondary (2 seasons)
2019– 2020	Servir y proteger	Aitana	Alexandra Graff	TVE	Secondary (15 episodes)
2018–2019	Mira lo que has hecho	Olga 1981	Berto Romero Javier Ruiz Caldera		Episodic (2 episodes)
2015	Cites	Judith	Pau Freixas	TV3	Principal (2 episodes)
2013	Kubala, Moreno y Manchón	Cèlia	Kiko Ruiz Abigail Schaaff	TV3	Episodic (1 episode)
2011	Tornarem	Estrella	Felip Solé	TV3	Principal (2 episodes)
2011	Ermessenda	Blanca	Lluís Maria Güell	TV3	Principal (2 episodes)
2007–2009	El cor de la ciutat	Eli	Esteve Rovira	TV3	Main (47 episodes)
2007	La otra ciudad	Nadia	Sílvia Quer	TVE, TV3	Main role

=== Theater ===
Year	Title	Character	Playwright	Directed by	Theater
2018-2021	La lleugeresa i altres cançons	Starring	Ivan Benet, Víctor Borràs	Ivan Benet	Sala Beckett, Atrium
2018	Othello	Desdémona	William Shakespeare	Oriol Tarrasón	Sala Villarroel
2018	Històries d'Istanbul	---	Yesim Özsoy	Joan Arqué	Teatre Lliure de Gràcia
2017	No exit	Inés	Jean-Paul Sartre	Loredana Volpe	Teatre Akadèmia
2015, 2016	Molt soroll per no res	Hero	William Shakespeare	Àngel Llàcer	Teatre Nacional de Catalunya
2014	La dama de las camèlies	Anaïs	Alexandre Dumas	Hermann Bonnín	La seca-Espai Brossa
2013	Mrs. Death, un diàleg amb Espriu	---	Clara Peya, Ariadna Peya, Míriam Escurriola	Míriam Escurriola	Versus teatre
2011–2012	The lonesome west	---	Martin McDonagh	Pepa Fluvià	Versus Teatre
2010–2011	La síndrome de Bucay	---	Joan Gallart i Rabert	Joan Gallart i Rabert	Versus Teatre
2007–2011	Cabaret incívic	---	---	---	---
