= Son of Cain =

- Film poster
- Catalan: Fill de Caín
- Directed by: Jesús Monllaó
- Written by: Sergio Barrejón; David Victori
- Based on: Dear Cain by Ignacio García-Valiño
- Produced by: Sebastian Mery
- Starring: José Coronado; Julio Manrique; David Solans; Maria Molins
- Cinematography: Jordi Bransuela
- Edited by: Bernat Aragonés; Guillermo de la Cal; Luis de la Madrid
- Music by: Ethan Lewis Maltby
- Production companies: Life&Pictures; Salto de Eje PC; Fosca Producciones; Televisió de Catalunya
- Distributed by: Alfa Pictures
- Release dates: 22 April 2013 (Málaga); 31 May 2013 (Spain)
- Running time: 90 minutes
- Country: Spain
- Languages: Spanish; Catalan

Son of Cain (Catalan: Fill de Caín) is a 2013 Spanish psychological thriller film directed by Jesús Monllaó and starring José Coronado, Julio Manrique, David Solans and Maria Molins. It is based on the novel Dear Cain by Ignacio García-Valiño. It is also Monllaó's directorial debut.

== Plot ==
The plot concerns the developments set in motion as the socially-awkward but gifted chess-playing boy Nico meets child psychologist Julio, who is also a chess aficionado. The latter ends up entangled in the affairs of Nico's family, formed by Nico's parents Carlos and Coral and his sister, the young Diana.

== Cast ==
- José Coronado as Carlos Albert
- Maria Molins as Coral Folch
- Julio Manrique as Julio Beltrán
- David Solans as Nico Albert
- Helena de la Torre as Diana
- Jack Taylor as Andrew Holsteter

== Production ==
The film was produced by Life&Pictures in co-production with Salto de Eje PC and Fosca Producciones and the associate production of TV3. It features dialogue in both the Spanish and the Catalan languages.

== Release ==
The film was presented at the Málaga Film Festival's official selection on 22 April 2013. Distributed by Alfa Pictures, the film was theatrically released in Spain on 31 May 2013. The film was excluded from the 28th Goya Awards because the release date was not duly notified in form to the academy.

== See also ==
- List of Spanish films of 2013
