= Metamorfosis (Vega album) =

Studio album by Vega
- Released: 28 April 2009
- Recorded: 2008
- Genre: Pop rock
- Length: 42:29
- Label: Universal Music
- Producer: Sebastian Krys

Vega chronology
Circular (2006) / Circular: Cómo Girar Sin Dar La Vuelta (2007)	Metamorfosis (2009)

Singles from Metamorfosis
- 1. "Mejor Mañana" Released: March 2009; 2. "Cuánta Decepción" Released: June 2009

Metamorfosis is the third studio album by Spanish singer Vega, released on 28 April 2009 (see 2009 in music), by Universal Music Spain. After a two-year-long break from the music industry, Vega recorded the album in Miami, with Latin Grammy Award winning producer, Sebastian Krys. The album peaked at No.12 on the Spanish album charts, selling 25,000 copies.

Vega describes it as being "very different album with songs that aren't as melancholic as those of my previous works." She goes onto to state the "theme of the album is quite broad. There are songs that reflect on the current situation we are experiencing, the way to face it and having hope and faith that things can be changed. There are also others about the spirit of self-improvement and friendship. Without leaving love behind, because basically, for me all songs talk about love or lack of love for something or someone."

== Track listing ==
1. "Lolita"
2. "Mejor Mañana"
3. "Nueva York"
4. "Cuánta Decepción"
5. "Nada Es Infinito"
6. "Dentro"
7. "Princesa De Cuento"
8. "Te Tengo A Ti"
9. "Mágico"
10. "Faro De Guía"
11. "A Salvo"
