= Raül Tortosa =

Spanish actor

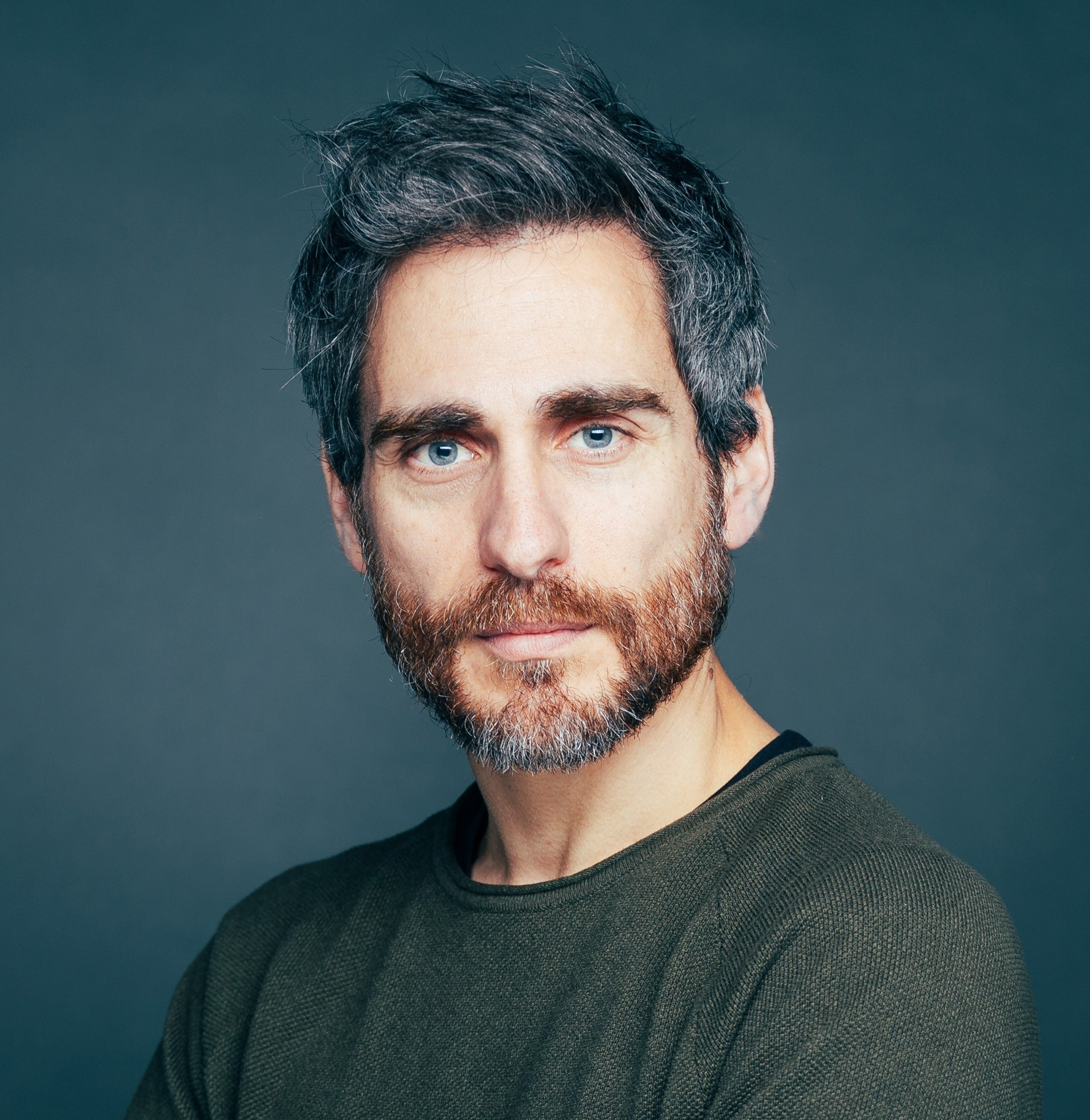
Raül Tortosa, headshot by Sergi Panizo.

Raül Tortosa is a Spanish actor and director born in Terrassa (Barcelona). He is also the vocalist of the pop-rock band Una Hora Más.

In 2016 he portrayed a Tyrell Captain in the HBO series Game of Thrones in Season 6. He won the Best Actor Award in the 16th edition of the Venice Shorts Film Festival 2021 in California (USA) for Shadowed.

== Biography ==
He studied drama at the Nancy Tuñón Studio (Barcelona) and in the Meisner Technique Program with Javer Galitó-Cava, combining his training with participation in several plays and numerous short films.

He made his television debut in 2005 with the TV3 series Pecats Capitals. He appeared several times on the program De Llibres and between 2006 and 2009 he played Nico in the popular Catalan series El cor de la ciutat. In 2014, he joined the series La Riera and also appeared in Joel Joan series El crac.

In 2005, he appeared in Manuel Huerga feature film Salvador (Puig Antich), playing Quim Puig Antich. In 2010, he played Leticia Dolera's ex-boyfriend in the TV movie Cuatro Estaciones, winner of the 2010 Gaudí Award for Best TV Movie.

Raül wins the Best Actor award at the 16th Venice Shorts Film Festival 2021 in California (USA) for Shadowed, a work that has also been awarded Best Thriller and Action Short Film at the Los Angeles International Film Festival. Fundido a negro, in which Raül plays a film screenwriter, was awarded Best Short Film at the 2012 Girona Film Festival.

Since 2007, she has been the lead singer of the pop rock band Una Hora Más. In 2012, the band released their first album, titled Tiempo de Locos. Their first music video was for the song “Si Vuelves.”

In 2012, Raül joined the theater company Apunta Teatre with the play Tu Digues Que l'Estimes. With the same company, he premiered the play Totes les Parelles Ho Fan at the Teatre Gaudí Barcelona and A Voz Ahogada, a tribute to Miguel Hernández, playing the political prisoner Lluís Martí Bielsa.

He appears in the sixth season of A Game of Thrones as captain of the Tyrell army.

His most recent television roles have been Duke Hermelando de Somoza in the series Acacias 38 (2016), the Prince of Éboli in Reinas (2017), and Aquilino Benegas in El secreto de Puente Viejo (2017).

In 2019, he co-directed the play Here Comes Your Man with Jordi Cadellans, which premiered in Madrid at the Sara Tarambana and Teatros Luchana theaters and in Barcelona at the Teatre Gaudí Barcelona and Teatre Aquitània theaters. Here Comes Your Man received the 2020 Talent Award for Performing Arts from the Barcelona Chamber of Commerce. He also co-directed Un Home Sol, again with Jordi Cadellans, and Ximpanzé and Solstici with Núria Florensa.

== Filmography ==
=== Films ===
- Killder by Joan Ramon Armadàs (production)
- Sant Martí by David C. Ruiz and Albert València (2017)
- 100 metros by Marcel Barrena (2016)
- Waratah: Pandemonium by Felix D'Ax and Hector Morgan (2016)
- Cromosoma Cinco by Maria Ripoll (2012)
- Cuatro Estaciones by Marcel Barrena (2010)
- Salvador (Puig Antich) by Manuel Huerga (2006)

=== Television ===
- Enemy of the people (2022)
- Los Herederos de la Tierra (2022)
- El secreto de Puente Viejo (2017)
- Queens (2017)
- Game of Thrones (2016)
- Acacias 38 (2016)
- El Crac (2014)
- La Riera (2014)
- El Cor de la Ciutat (2006–2009)
- Llegendes Urbanes (2008)
- Lalola (2008)
- De Llibres (2006)
- Pecats Capitals (2005)

=== Shortfilms ===
- El Elegido (Felipe Franco, postproduction).
- Sincopat (Pol Diggler, 2023).
- Vueltas (Jordina Sarlé, 2023).
- AmArte (Mireia Boté, 2023).
- A Little Death (Maria Pawlikowska, 2021).
- Shadowed (Juliette Hagopian, 2021).
- Atropos (Carlos Cobos and Alejandro Arenas, 2019).
- Lia (Marta Viña, 2017).
- Una tarde con Bolaño (Miquel Casals, 2016).
- Lina (Nur Casadevall, 2015).
- L'Altre Costat (Joaquim Bundó, 2015).
- Petra (Ginebra Bricollé and Alejandra García Herrero, 2015).
- Encadenados (Albert Sánchez, 2014).
- 400KM (Miquel Casals, 2014).
- Fundido a negro (Miquel Casals, 2011).
- Persuasió (Miquel Casals, 2009).
- En el Mundo de Hopper (Maria Verdú, 2009).
- Saps res de vàters? (Maria Verdú, 2009).
- Recuerdos anónimos (Eduard Riu, 2009).
- Larga distancia (Gemma Ferraté, 2009).
- Visceral (2008).
- Primo (Mikel Gurrea, 2007).
- Lazy (Elisenda Granero, 2007).
- Juego de niños (Laura Cladelles, 2006).
- A gay’s life (Luís Fabra, 2006).
- Troy (Miki Loma, 2006).
- Blanco roto (Nerea Lebrero, 2006).
- C-80 (Eduard Soriano, 2006).
- Costuras (Iván Tomás Félez, 2006).
- Lágrimas de Cocodrilo (Carles Curt, 2005).
- El baile del cangrejo (Lorena Hernández, 2006).
- Zulo (Albert Vall, 2004).
- 15x20 (Ferran Collado, 2004).
- La quinta (Patricia Esteban, Laia Gómez, 2004).
- Las llaves de Disneylandia (Breixo Corral, 2004).
- 45 Frames (Gustavo Romero, 2004).
- Absurdo (Tomás Suárez, 2004).

== Theatre (as an actor) ==
- Kalumba (2022)
- Nyotaimori (2021)
- El Brindis (2019-2022)
- El Millor per als Nostres Fills (2019)
- Separacions (2019)
- Gustafsson R60 (2019)
- Sota la Catifa (2017)
- Per tu, m'enamoraria (2017)
- El Dramaturgo (2016)
- A Voz Ahogada, un homenaje a Miguel Hernández (2016)
- La Estuardo (2016)
- Más Retales (2016)
- Retales (2014-2015)
- Hoy Me Voy Con Bla Bla Car (2014)
- Suite 315 (2014)
- Totes Les Parelles Ho Fan (2013)
- Tu Digues Que l'Estimes (2012-2014)
- Una mirada inocente (2003)

== Theatre (as a director) ==
- Solstici (2023)
- Ximpanzé (2021)
- Un Home Sol (2021)
- Here Comes Your Man (2019)

== Theatre (as assistant director) ==
- Nyotaimori (2021-2022)
- Tonta (2020-2021)

== Music (Una Hora Más) ==
=== Una Hora Más albums ===
- Tiempo de Locos (2012)

=== Una Hora Más videoclips ===
- Tiempo de Locos (2014)
- Si Vuelves (2013)
