= Cedrick Mugisha =

Rwandan footballer (born 1997)

Personal information
- Full name: Cedrick Mughisha Banzi
- Date of birth: 14 May 1997 (age 29)
- Place of birth: Rwanda
- Position: Midfielder

Team information
- Current team: Rayo Vallecano de Madrid

Cedrick Mughisha Banzi (born 14 May 1997 in Kigali, Rwanda) is a football player and television and film actor, known for his performances in the Spanish television series Smiley in 2022 with Catalan actor Carlos Cuevas.

He played in 1. SC Znojmo FK in Czech Republic, then in the Rayo Vallecano football club in Madrid from 2021.

In 2019, he appeared in Pedro Almodóvar's movie Pain and Glory.

He also appeared on the Spanish TV series Cuéntame cómo pasó and sitcom La que se avecina.
