= Elisabet Casanovas =

Spanish actress

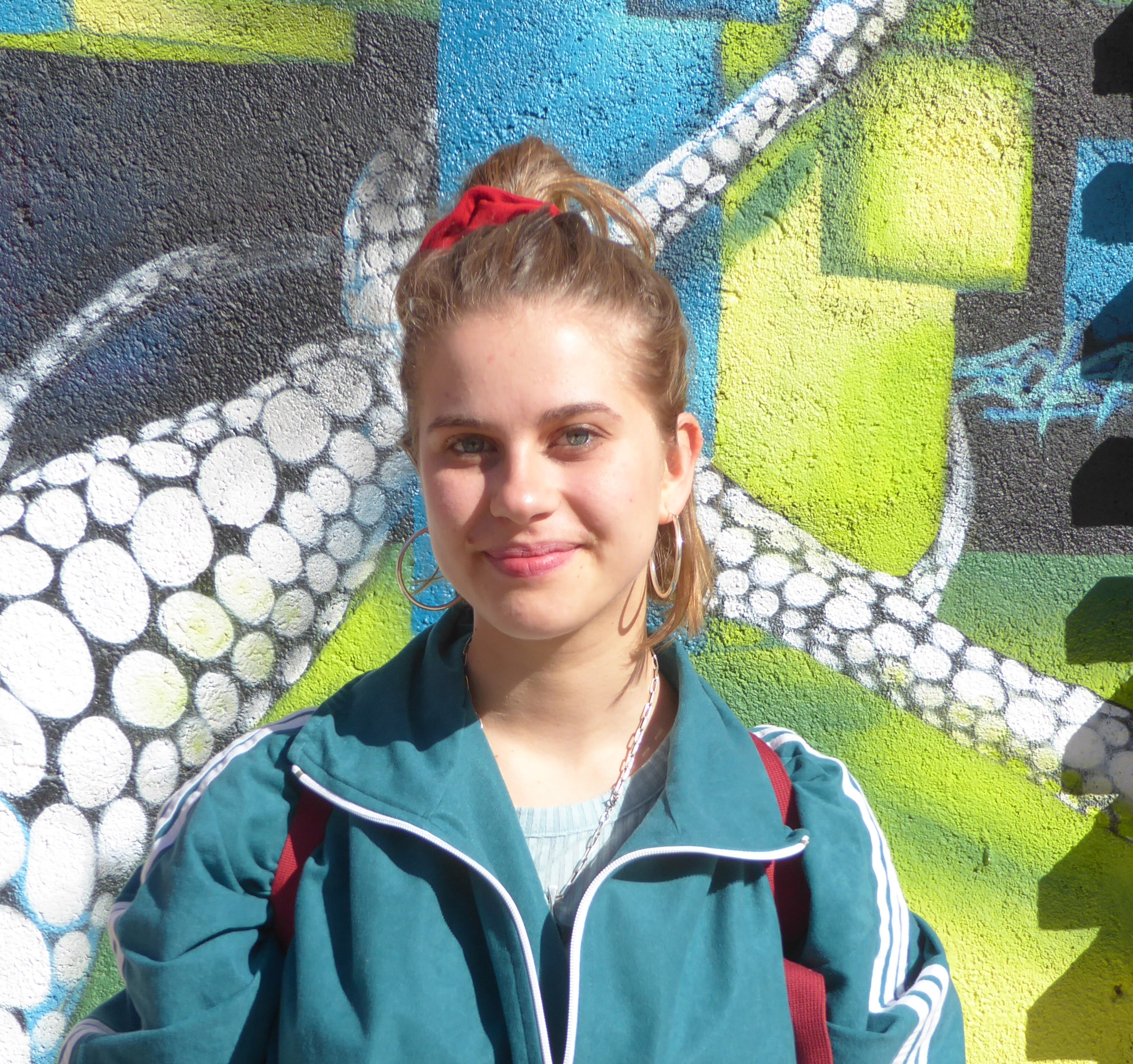
- Born: 1994 (age 31–32); Sabadell, Catalonia, Spain

Elisabet Casanovas (born 1994) is a Spanish actress from Catalonia.

== Life and career ==
Elisabet Casanovas was born in Sabadell, Vallès Occidental in 1994. Her mother was an opera singer. She first performed as an actress at age 11. In 2017, her portrayal of Zerafina in stage play La senyora Florentina i el seu amor Homer won her a Butaca Award for Best Supporting Performance. Her small screen career consolidated with her credits in television series Merlí, Welcome to the Family, and, to a larger degree, Drama, in which she starred as África, a young woman living in Barcelona who gets pregnant but she does not know by whom.

After a minor work in Ardara, her first major role in a feature film came in Girlfriends (2021), playing Bea, a member of a foursome of female friends described by Casanovas as always remaining positive. Also in 2021, she appeared in Outlaws and Sounds Like Love. In 2022, she starred as fashion designer Nuria in Atresplayer drama series The Route. In 2023, she had a leading role in TV3 series Bojos per Molière, portraying Kàtia, a veterinary student who switches to acting. She also joined shooting of TVE original drama Las abogadas, set against the backdrop of the 1977 Atocha massacre, in which Casanovas will star as lawyer Cristina Almeida.

== Filmography ==
=== Film ===
Year	Title	Role	Notes	Ref.
2019	Ardara			
2021	Chavalas (Girlfriends)	Bea		
2021	Las leyes de la frontera (Outlaws)	Cristina		
2021	Fuimos canciones (Sounds Like Love)	Jimena		
2026	El rastre del llop (The Trail of the Wolf)	Sofía		

=== Television ===
Year	Title	Role	Notes	Ref.
2015–18	Merlí	Tània Illa		
2018–19	Benvinguts a la família (Welcome to the Family)	Paula		
2020	Drama	África		
2022	La ruta (The Route)	Nuria		
2023	Bojos per Molière	Kàtia		
2024	Las abogadas	Cristina Almeida		

== Accolades ==
Year	Award	Category	Work	Result	Ref.
2017	23rd Butaca Awards	Best Supporting Actress	La senyora Florentina i el seu amor Homer	Won	
2023	10th Feroz Awards	Best Supporting Actress in a TV Series	The Route	Nominated	
