= The Tree of Blood =

2018 film by Julio Médem

- Theatrical release poster
- Spanish: El árbol de la sangre
- Directed by: Julio Medem
- Written by: Julio Medem
- Starring: Úrsula Corberó; Álvaro Cervantes; Najwa Nimri; Maria Molins; Patricia López Arnaiz; Daniel Grao; Joaquín Furriel; Emilio Gutiérrez Caba; Luisa Gavasa; José María Pou; Ángela Molina
- Cinematography: Kiko de la Rica
- Production companies: Arcadia Motion Pictures; Galatea Films; Diamond Films España; Aixerrota Films; Noodles Production
- Distributed by: Diamond Films
- Release date: October 31, 2018 (Spain)
- Running time: 130 minutes
- Countries: Spain; France
- Language: Spanish
- Budget: €5.6 million
- Box office: €323,804 + €1.4 million

The Tree of Blood (Spanish: El árbol de la sangre) is a 2018 Spanish-French drama film written and directed by Julio Medem. It stars Úrsula Corberó and Álvaro Cervantes alongside Najwa Nimri, Maria Molins, Patricia López Arnaiz, Daniel Grao, Joaquín Furriel, Emilio Gutiérrez Caba, Luisa Gavasa, José María Pou and Ángela Molina.

== Cast ==
- Álvaro Cervantes as Marc
- Úrsula Corberó as Rebeca
- Patricia López Arnaiz as Amaia
- Joaquín Furriel as Olmo
- María Molins as Nuria
  - Lucía Delgado portrays young Nuria.
- Luka Peros as Dimitri
- Najwa Nimri as Macarena
- Daniel Grao as Víctor
- Luisa Gavasa as Candela
- Emilio Gutiérrez Caba as Pío
- Ángela Molina as Julieta
- Josep Maria Pou as Jacinto

== Production ==
A Spanish-French co-production, the film was produced by Arcadia Motion Pictures, Galatea Films, Diamond Films España, Aixerrota Films and Noodles Production, with the participation of EiTB and Movistar+ and support from ICAA and Eurimages. Shooting locations included the Basque Country, Catalonia and Madrid.

== Release ==
Distributed by Diamond Films, the film was theatrically released in Spain on October 31, 2018.

== Reception ==
According to the review aggregation website Rotten Tomatoes, The Tree of Blood has a 55% approval rating based on 11 reviews from critics, with an average rating of 5.5/10.

Beatriz Martínez of Fotogramas rated the film 3 out of 5 stars, tentatively tagging it as a kind of Julio Medem's "greatest hits".

== See also ==
- List of Spanish films of 2018
