= Ventdelplà =

- Genre: Drama
- Created by: Josep Maria Benet i Jornet
- Directed by: Ignasi Tarruella; Carmen Pérez; Abigail Schaaff
- Starring: Emma Vilarasau; Jordi Boixaderas; Georgina Latre; Carlos Cuevas; Cristina Dilla
- Narrated by: Carlos Cuevas
- Country of origin: Spain
- Original language: Catalan
- No. of seasons: 7
- No. of episodes: 365

Production
- Camera setup: Multi-camera
- Running time: 25–30 minutes approx.
- Production company: Diagonal TV

Original release
- Network: TV3
- Release: February 14, 2005 – October 17, 2010

Ventdelplà (Catalan pronunciation: [ˌbendəlˈpla]) was a Catalan TV series that was aired on TV3. It was created by Josep Maria Benet i Jornet and 365 episodes were aired between 2005 and 2010.

== Plot ==
The plot centers on Teresa, a woman abused by her husband and who flees from Barcelona to the fictional village of Ventdelplà (Breda) where she has an uncle, Gustau. Although initially intending to sell the house and go back to Barcelona, she stays in Ventdelplà. The series narrates the lives of the town's people.

Teresa Clarís is a housewife, married to a prestigious Barcelona lawyer. She has two children of 15 and 8 years, and completed medical studies. Her husband soon makes her drop everything to take care of the children and especially of him. When she wants to regain some independence, everything gets complicated. She has to flee and take refuge temporarily at her uncle Gustau in Ventdelplà.

== Cast ==
- Emma Vilarasau
- Carlos Cuevas
- Georgina Latre Giró
- Joan Crosas
- Joan Crosas
- Ramon Madaula
- Nao Albet
- Miquel Gelabert
- Anna Barrachina
- Marc Cartes Ivern
- Jordi Boixaderas
- Rosa Vila
- Pep Cruz
- Úrsula Corberó
- Teresa Urroz
- Mar Ulldemolins i Sarret
- Pau Roca
- Boris Ruiz
- Isabel Rocatti
- Marta Marco i Vinyes
- Abel Folk
- Rosa Gàmiz
- Oriol Puig
