= Sounds Like Love (film) =

2021 film by Juana Macías

- Official release poster
- Spanish: Fuimos canciones
- Directed by: Juana Macías
- Screenplay by: Laura Sarmiento
- Based on: Songs and Memories by Elísabet Benavent
- Produced by: Antonio Asensio
- Starring: María Valverde; Álex González; Elisabet Casanovas; Susana Abaitua; Miri Pérez-Cabrero; Eva Ugarte; Ignacio Montes; Artur Busquets; Claudia Galán; Roger Berruezo; Carlo Costanzia
- Cinematography: Pau Castejón Úbeda
- Edited by: Victoria Lammers
- Music by: Yuri Méndez Barrios
- Production company: Zeta Studios
- Distributed by: Netflix
- Release date: 29 September 2021
- Running time: 111 minutes
- Country: Spain
- Language: Spanish

Sounds Like Love (Spanish: Fuimos canciones, lit. 'We Were Songs') is a 2021 Spanish romantic comedy film directed by Juana Macías from a screenplay by Laura Sarmiento, based on the 2018 novel duology Canciones y recuerdos by Elísabet Benavent. The film stars María Valverde and Álex González and was released on Netflix on 29 September 2021.

== Plot ==
Maca, a clumsy 30 year-old who lives in Madrid, is stuck as an assistant for an oppressive and terrifying fashion influencer, wasting her talent and spending most of her time with men with whom she never manages to establish an emotional bond. Together with her two unique and loveable friends, Jimena and Adriana, Maca endeavours to make the most of life and happiness, despite her dead-end job, making almost everything possible. All seems to be going well until Maca's ex Leo returns to her life, flipping her almost perfect life upside down. Leo was the biggest mistake of Maca's life, the man who tore her heart apart and obliterated her self-esteem and her faith in men. Maca had forgotten all about him, but now she has to accept that he has suddenly come back into her life and she must face those emotions that she has repressed for so long, dealing with the unforgettable memory of what could have been and never was.

== Cast ==
- María Valverde as Maca
- Álex González as Leo
- Elisabet Casanovas as Jimena
- Susana Abaitua as Adriana
- Eva Ugarte as Raquel
- Miri Pérez-Cabrero as Pipa
- Roger Berruezo as Julián
- Ignacio Montes Samuel
- Artur Busquets as Jorge
- Claudia Galán as Julia
- Carlo Costanzia as Coque

== Production ==
On 30 January 2020, it was announced that Netflix had greenlighted an adaptation of Elísabet Benavent's two-part book series Songs and Memories during a Spanish original programming conference in Madrid. The film began principal photography on 5 October 2020, when it was announced that Juana Macías was attached to direct the film from a screenplay by Laura Sarmiento. It was also announced that María Valverde and Álex González were cast in lead roles, with Elísabet Casanovas, Susana Abaitúa, Eva Ugarte, and Miri Pérez-Cabrero also set to star in the film alongside Roger Berruezo, Ignacio Montes, Artur Busquets, Claudia Galán, and Carlo Costanzia who were cast in supporting roles. Filming took place throughout Madrid and Lisbon. By May 2021, the film had completed production, with Benavent stating:

It was very difficult, they had a challenge. They are two books of more than 500 pages and they had to put them together in 90 minutes of film. There are plots that cannot be developed because there is no time and, even so, how they have respected the spirit of each character, how they have collected the most important things to make them shine… I have seen the result and it is incredible.

== Release ==
The film was released on 29 September 2021 by Netflix.

== See also ==
- List of Spanish films of 2021
