= El Cor de la Ciutat =

- Genre: Soap opera
- Created by: Jordi Galceran; Lluís Arcarazo; Josep Maria Benet i Jornet
- Theme music composer: Albert Guinovart
- Countries of origin: Catalonia, Spain
- Original language: Catalan
- No. of seasons: 9
- No. of episodes: 1,906

Production
- Running time: 27 minutes per episode

Original release
- Network: TV3, TVC Internacional and Canal 300
- Release: 11 September 2000 – 23 December 2009

El cor de la ciutat (The Heart of the City) is a TVC television soap opera first broadcast on TV3 on 11 September 2000 and last broadcast on 23 December 2009. The show is the most watched fiction program in Catalonia, Spain, especially among female audiences, drawing around 28-33% of the audience with as much as 40% during season finales. El cor de la ciutat follows the lives of the people who live and work in the neighbourhood of Sants and Sant Andreu in Barcelona, Catalonia, Spain.

A total of 9 seasons aired between 2000 and 2009. Five episodes aired each week, one on each weekday, on TV3. With a total of 1,906 episodes, El cor de la Ciutat became the longest-running television series produced by TVC. The show received almost 800,000 viewers and during season finales some episodes had over one million viewers. At the end of each season, a special night of programming dedicated to the soap opera, known as La Nit del Cor (The Night of the Heart), would air.

During the sixth season of the show (2005–2006), there was a change of neighbourhood for the show, as the Peris-Noguera family had to move from Sant Andreu to Sants, both of which are real areas of Barcelona. The family had fallen into poverty by selling their bar in order to pay release charges to prevent their son, David, from returning to prison. Having thought they had paid it all off, a large compensation claim was made against the family. The claim was made by one of the widowers of a dead passenger, killed in an accident involving a cruiser crashing into the front of The Chyme, a restaurant on the coast of Menorca which David worked in as a chef. In spite of the renewal of characters that the change of location has brought to the program, many of the older characters from Sant Andreu have turned up in episodes set in Sants - some of them, like Francisco and Remei even moved to Sants soon after the Peris-Noguera family.

As a result of the show's move to Sants, viewers have been introduced to the stories behind characters such as the Galiana/Gutiérrez family, Mercè Amorós Sendra and the teachers at the high school there very quickly. Moreover, some of the new characters which have passed through the new series have been played by very famous actors such as Joan Pera and Àngels Gonyalons, who both made two special collaborations during the seventh season of the show (2006 - 2007).

Two years after leaving Sant Andreu, the life of the Peris-Noguera family has changed a lot. Cinta Noguera, now very ill, decides to do everything possible for the Peris-Noguera family to get their bar back in Sant Andreu. The death of his wife makes Pere Peris reassess his life and so he decides start again in his lifelong neighbourhood with his infant daughter, Carolina, and his new partner Àngela Montford. This return to Sant Andreu opens the door to a new phase of the series. From 12 September 2007, the series is broadcast in high definition, incorporates ten new actors and the majority of characters are from Sant Andreu again whilst retaining some of the more popular protagonists of Sants (such as Fidel Amorós Furió, Benet Sepúlveda Campruví (Beni), the Sendra sisters, Trini González and the Benjumea family).

The interior location scenes were recorded at TVC's studios in l'Hospitalet de Llobregat, Barcelona.

== Cast and characters ==
- Àlex Casanovas ... Fidel Amorós (2005–2009)
- Amparo Moreno... Trini (2005–2009)
- Pep Anton Muñoz ... Peris (2000–2009)
- Armando Aguirre ... Juan Benjumea (2006–2009)
- Artur Trias ... Francisco (2000–2009)
- Ramon Godino ... Rai (2003–2009)
- Nausicaa Bonnín ... Sandra Benjumea (2005–2009)
- Bernat Quintana ... Max Carbó (2000–2009)
- Santi Ibáñez ... Beni (2006–2009)
- Enric Rodríguez ... Òscar Benjumea (2005–2009)
- Fermí Casado ... Marc Pomerol Santiró (2007–2009)
- Toni Sevilla ... Paco Pardo (2004–2009)
- Meritxell Ané ... Remei (2000–2009)
- Sílvia Aranda ... Sara Medina Pou (2005–2009)
- Marc Clotet ... Iago (2007–2009)
- Maife Gil ... Cecília (2004–2009)
- Paula Vives ... Mercè (2005–2009)
- Jordi Díaz ... Fede Pardo (2001–2009)
- Carmen Contreras ... Roser Balaguer (2000–2009)
- Mercè Arànega ... Paquita Miralles (2000–2009)
- Sílvia Sabaté ... Clara Bosch (2000–2008)
- Miquel García Borda ... Marcel Navarro (2001–2009)
- Isaac Alcayde ... Rafa (2000–2009)
- Eduardo González ... Nelson (2000–2009)
- Iván Morales ... Pau Bayarri Cortés (2007–2009)
- Mercè Montalà ... Àngela Montfort (2006–2009)
- Manel Barceló ... Galiana (2005–2007)
- Susana Bas ... Noèlia (2005–2009)
- Raül Tortosa ... Nico (2007–2009)
- Santi Pons ... Orpinell (2008–2009)
- Mercè Pons ... Patrícia Guerau (2008–2009)
- Margarida Minguillón ... Cinta (2000–2007)
- Jordi Parés ... Enric (2006–2007)
- Oriol Pla ... Juli (2008–2009)
- Aida Oset ... Eli (2007–2009)
- Jaume Bernet ... Felip (2006–2009)
- Tony Corvillo ... Jon (2005–2009)
- Aleix Albareda ... Sergi Frias Miralpeix (2004–2009)
- Mingo Ràfols ... Quico Santamaria Vilardell (2008–2009)
- Carles Garcia ... Àlex (2008–2009)
- Anna Lluch ... Helga (2006–2008)
- Mone ... Empar (2006–2007)
- Roser Batalla ... Berta (2007–2008)
- Aina Clotet ... Mònica (2006–2007)
- Ferran Rañé ... Gerard (2008–2009)
- Cati Solivellas ... Loli (2005–2007)
- Ariadna Gaya ... Lluna Llobet (2008–2009)
- Francesca Piñón ... Virgínia (2006–2007)
- Mont Plans ... Quima Vilardell (2008–2009)
- Oriol Vila ... Ivan Crespo (2000–2009)
- Joan Massotkleiner ... Paco Benjumea (2005–2008)
- Gemma Brió ... Marga Llobet Ramos (2007–2009)
- Carles Goñi ... Paré (2006–2007)

== La Nit del Cor ==
La Nit del Cor (The Night of The Heart) was an evening of programming and live content associated with the show. The special evening of programming would take place on the Sunday evening following the broadcast of the final episode of a season of the soap opera.

The evening begins with an hour-long special episode of the soap opera which wraps up many of the storylines created during the past season whilst also creating a cliffhanger ending which will be returned to during the next series.

After the hour-long special, a special evening is held at the National Theatre of Catalonia (TNC), Barcelona, which is attended by all the actors and actresses from the cast of the series, including a few that will join the series during the next season as new characters. Prizes were also awarded to actors, actresses and scriptwriters throughout the evening. Up until 2004, a different television personality presented the awards each year. In both 2005 and 2006, the awards were presented by Albert Om, Cristina Puig and Màbel Martí who are all from the television programme El Club, broadcast on the same channel as El cor de la ciutat, TV3.
