= Josep Maria Benet i Jornet =

Spanish playwright (1940–2020)

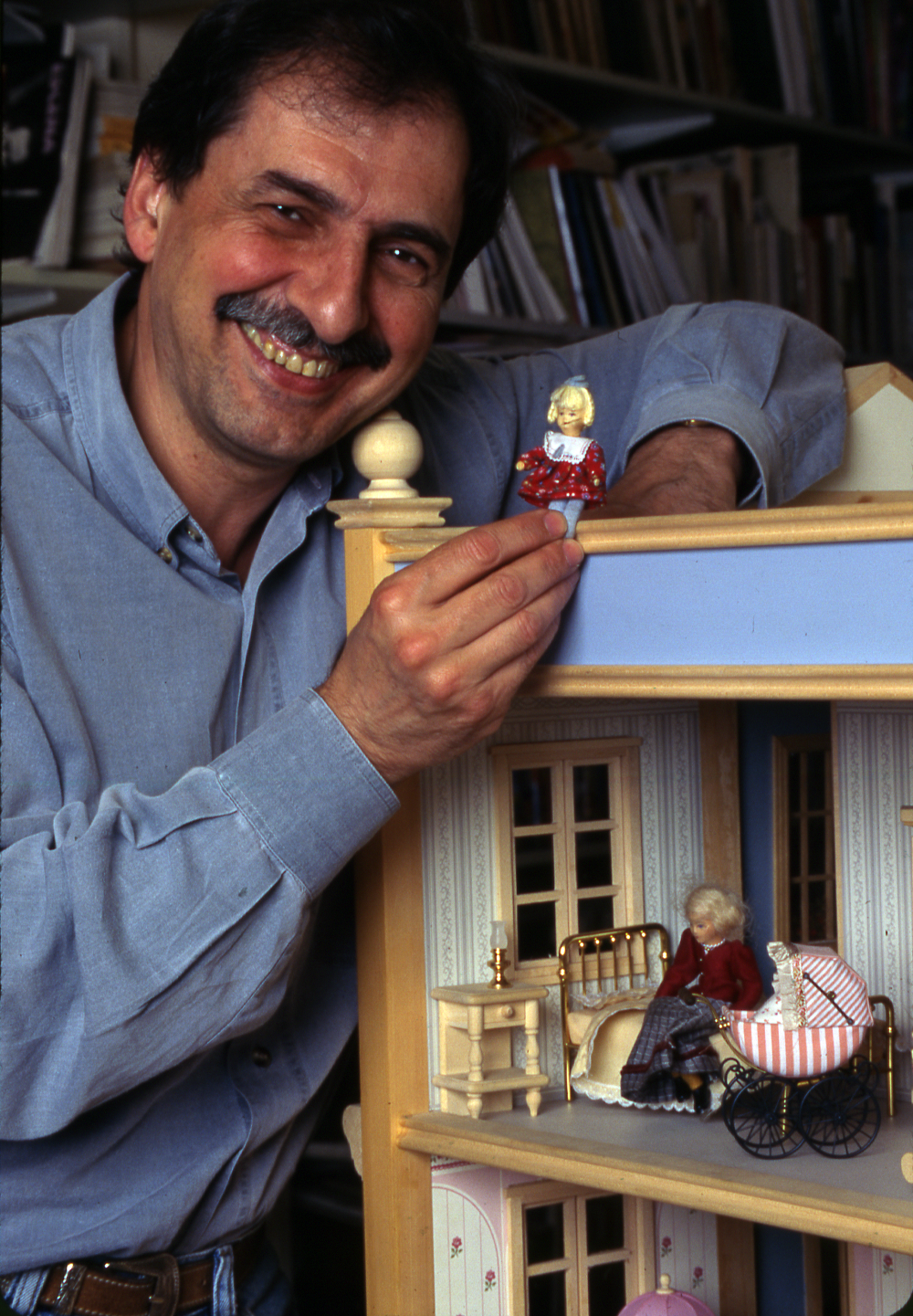
- Josep Maria Benet i Jornet
- Born: 20 June 1940; Barcelona, Spain
- Died: 6 April 2020 (aged 79); Lleida, Spain
- Occupation: Playwright

Josep Maria Benet i Jornet (Catalan pronunciation: [ʒuˈzɛb məˈɾi.ə βəˈnɛt]; 20 June 1940 – 6 April 2020), also known as "Papitu", was one of the most renowned Catalan playwrights, considered one of the main renewers of Catalan theater.

== Biography ==
He was born in a tiny Barcelona apartment in Ronda de Sant Antoni on 20 June 1940, from parents Concepció Jornet and Pere Benet.

Growing up, his love for playwriting emerged from reading comic book strips, in which he made up his own dialogues; and he also learned from popular readings and the world of radiophonic serials.

He was an active participant in the fight against the Spanish dictatorship, although he never affiliated with any political parties. He took clandestine Catalan literature lessons with Joaquim Molas, through Joan-Lluís Marfany. He majored in Literature at the University of Barcelona, and in 1962, he enrolled in Adrià Gual's School of Dramatic Arts, where he came into contact with the most renowned personalities in theater of that time, such as Ricard Salvat, Maria Aurèlia Capmany, Josep Montanyès, Fabià Puigserver or Francesc Nel·lo. Years later, he became a dramatic literature teacher in Barcelona's Institut del Teatre, where he taught from 1974 to 1981.

In 1963, at the age of 23, he published his first play, Una vella, coneguda olor, a breakthrough piece due to the realism in its tone, which, as it had never done before, gave an in-depth look into the contemporary Barcelona through theater. This debutant piece was awarded the Premi Josep Maria de Sagarra award, and launched his playwriting career. Ever since then, the author wrote over forty theater plays, which were translated into a dozen different languages. Two of his most renowned hits, E.R. and Testament, were adapted into the big screen format by cinematographer Ventura Pons. In 2010, he published his memoirs, which he titled Material d'enderroc (Edicions 62).

He was also the screenwriter for some of Catalan public broadcast channel TV3's most emblematic television soap operas, such as Poble Nou, Nissaga de Poder, or Ventdelplà.

Throughout his life, his professional trajectory was recognized with several awards, such as:

- Premi Josep Maria de Sagarra for his play Una vella, coneguda olor (1963).
- Premi de Teatre Català Ciutat de Sabadell for his play Berenàveu a les fosques (1972).
- Premi Nacional de Literatura Dramàtica de les Lletres Espanyoles for his play E.R. (1995).
- Creu de Sant Jordi by the Catalan government (1997).
- Premi de la Institució de les Lletres Catalanes de guions audiovisuals (1998).
- Premi Max d'Honor to the best Catalan theater author (2010).
- Premi d'Honor de les Lletres Catalanes (2013).

In March 2011, he publicly announced that he was donating his funds to the Library of Catalonia. He was diagnosed with Alzheimer's in 2015, which his daughter Carlota Benet later made public in a tribute held in the Teatre Nacional de Catalunya celebrating his 75th birthday. As his illness progressed, he was put under residential care in Llar Sant Josep de Lleida nursing home for the elderly, where he died from COVID-19 during the coronavirus pandemic in Spain on 6 April 2020 at the age of 79.

In 2017, Carlota Benet published the essay "Papitu. El somriure sota el bigoti", Editorial Columna, about his father's memories.

== Theatre ==
- Una vella, coneguda olor (1964, Premi Josep Maria de Sagarra 1963)
- Cançons perdudes (1970)
- Fantasia per a un auxiliar administratiu: obra en dues parts (1970)
- Berenàveu a les fosques (1972)
- Supertot (1973)
- La desaparició de Wendy (1974)
- Revolta de bruixes (1976)
- La nau (1977)
- Descripció d'un paisatge i altres textos (1979)
- Quan la ràdio parlava de Franco (1980)
- Baralla entre olors: peça dramàtica en un acte (1981)
- Elisabet i Maria (1982)
- Dins la catedral (Josafat) (1985)
- El manuscrit d'Alí-Bey (1985)
- Ai, carai! (1989)
- Dos camerinos: apunts sobre la bellesa-3 (1990)
- Desig (1991)
- A la clínica: apunts sobre la bellesa del temps - 1 (1993)
- Fugaç (1994)
- Alopècia (1994)
- E.R. (1995)
- Precisament avui / Confessió (1996)
- Testament (1997)
- El gos del tinent (1999)
- Olors (2000)
- Això, a un fill, no se li fa (2002)
- L'habitació del nen (2003)
- Salamandra (2005)
- Soterrani (2008)
- Dues dones que ballen (2010)
- Com dir-ho? (2013)

== Television ==
- Vídua, però no gaire (1982)
- Telegaseta de Catalunya (1984)
- Recordar, peligro de muerte (1986)
- Poble Nou (1993–1994)
- Pedralbes Centre (1995)
- Nissaga de poder (1996–1998)
- Laberint d'ombres (1998–2000)
- Rías Baixas (2000)
- El cor de la ciutat (2000–2009)
- Mirall trencat (2002)
- Ventdelplà (2005–2010)
- Amar en tiempos revueltos (2005–2012)
- Mar de fons (2006–2007)
- Zoo (2008)
- Amar es para siempre (2013–?)
