= David Solans =

Spanish actor

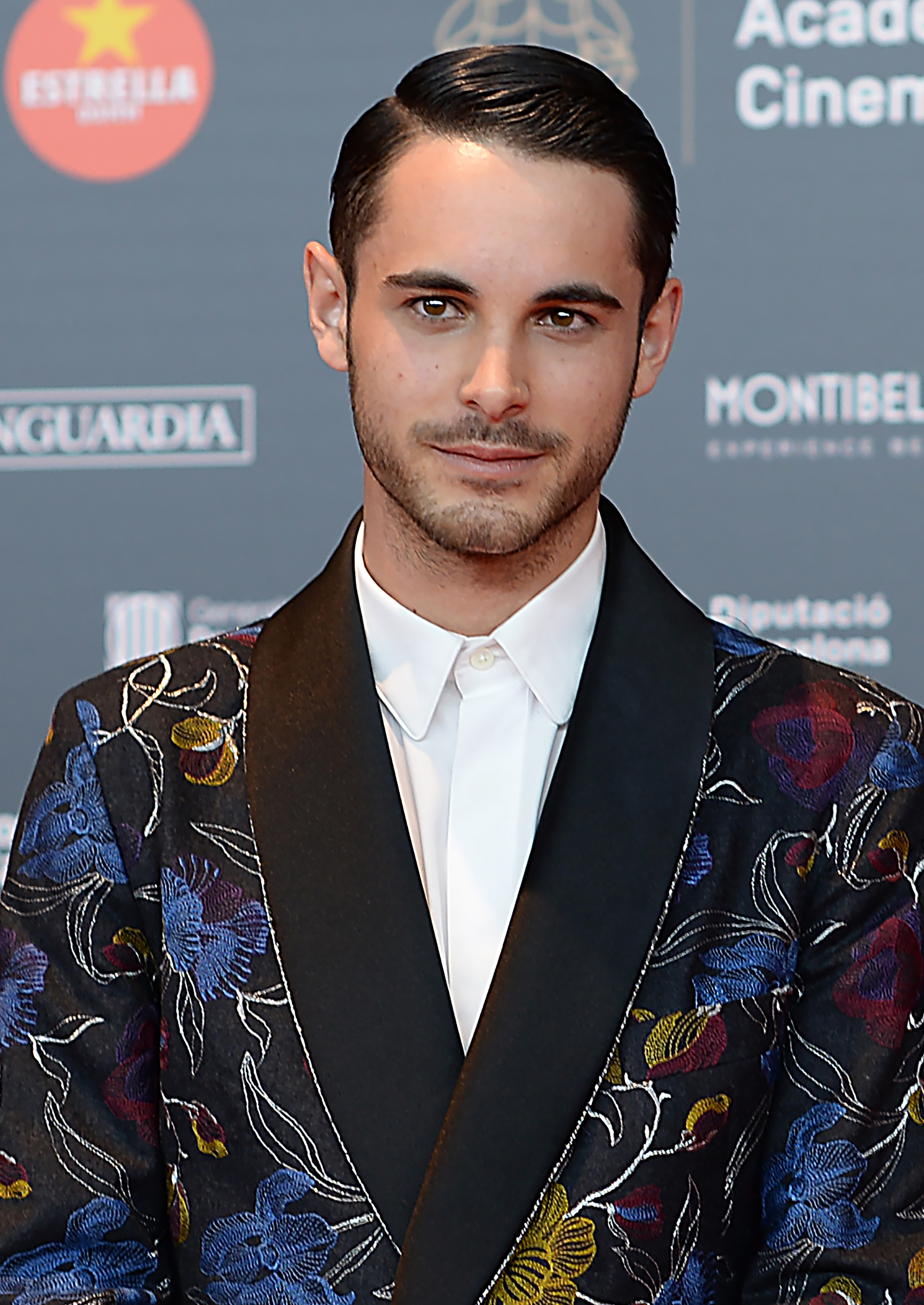
- Born: David Solans Cortés; 3 August 1996 (age 29); Vilassar de Mar, Catalonia, Spain
- Occupation: actor
- Known for: Merlí

David Solans Cortés (born 3 August 1996) is a Spanish film and television actor.

== Biography ==
Solans' film debut was with Jesús Monllaó, who gave him the opportunity to participate in the film Son of Cain, where he played Nico, a psychopathic boy obsessed with chess.

In the following years, he played the protagonist in the web series directed by Marc and Oriol Puig, La caida de Apolo, and in the feature film El dulce sabor de limón by David Aymerich.

His first appearance on the small screen was in the series Bajo sospecha of Antena 3, where he played Oscar in the first season of the series.

In 2015, he starred in the TV series Merlí from TV3, where he plays Bruno Bergeron, a student who finds it difficult to accept himself how he is, and whose father becomes his new philosophy teacher. Due to the grand acclaim the series received in the Catalan public, La Sexta decided to dub the series in Castilian for the whole country. In 2016, the second season of Merlí aired. He left the series after the 12th episode, one episode before the season ended.

That year, he also began a four-episode mini-series on Telecinco, Lo que escondían sus ojos, playing Ramón Serrano Suñer.

== Filmography ==
=== Television ===
- 2015: Bajo sospecha, as Óscar Vidal
- 2015–2018: Merlí, as Bruno Bergeron
- 2016: Lo que escondían sus ojos, as Ramón Serrano-Suñer Polo
- 2018: El Punto Frío, as Martín
- 2018: Boca Norte, as Daniel
- 2019: La caza. Monteperdido, as Quim
- 2019: Días de Navidad, as Juan
- 2019: Merlí: Sapere Aude, as Bruno
- 2022: Heirs to the Land, as young Hugo Llor
- 2022: The Longest Night, as Javi
- 2023: Holy Family, as Samuel Velardo Sanchez

=== Film ===
- 2013: Hijo de Caín, as Nico
- 2013: La caída de Apolo, as Max
- 2017: El dulce sabor del limón, as Jaume

=== Theater ===
- 2017: A cada rey su merecido, as Zarek

== Awards and nominations ==
In 2014, he was nominated by the Catalan Academy of Cinema (along with José Sacristán, Javier Cámara y Eduard Fernández) and the Círculo de Escritores Cinematográficos for his role in Hijo de Caín, and won Best Actor at Girona Film Festival for his performance in La caída de Apolo.
