= Lunae =

Spanish pop group

Lunae was a short-lived Spanish pop group built upon the success of Operación Triunfo a reality show talent contest popular on Spain's TVE network.

The band was composed by putting together singers that were not given the chance to pursue a solo career after the show, and was composed of Tessa (born 7 November 1982), Elena Gadel (born 11 November 1982) and Marey (born 19 December 1983)

In the summer of 2003, their debut single 'Hipnotizadas' (produced by Xenomania) was a minor summertime hit across Spain, and it was used in a Pringles advertisement tie-in. In September, Lunae released their debut album, Olor a Nuevo. It included 13 tracks, with 3 in English. It also included a collaboration with Enrique Anaut, Operación Triunfo Season 2 fellow finalist. In January 2004, Lunae released their second single Viva Otra Vez.

By March 2004, the band members were working on separate projects (Elena Gadel and Tessa moving on to musicals). However, they still were 'Lunae' at the Spanish Song for Europe in April 2004, and they still performed together until April 2005, although singing the same songs from their debut album two years before. In July 2005 Elena Gadel confirmed the end of Lunae in an interview.

== Discography ==
=== Albums ===
- Olor a nuevo (2003)

=== Singles ===
- Hipnotizadas (2003)
- Viva Otra Vez (2004)
