= Merlí (TV series) =

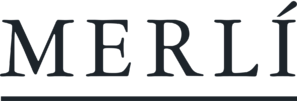
- Genre: Comedy drama Teen drama
- Created by: Héctor Lozano and Eduard Cortés
- Starring: Francesc Orella; Pere Ponce; Pau Durà; Mar del Hoyo; David Solans; Candela Antón; Albert Baró; Pau Poch; Carlos Cuevas; Elisabet Casanovas; Ana María Barbany; Marta Marco i Viñas; Victòria Pagès; Asunción Balaguer; Rick Baster
- Opening theme: By Xavi Capellas
- Ending theme: By Xavi Capellas
- Country of origin: Spain
- Original language: Catalan
- No. of seasons: 3
- No. of episodes: 40

Production
- Producer: Televisió de Catalunya
- Production location: Barcelona

Original release
- Release: 14 September 2015 – 15 January 2018

Related
- Merlí: Sapere Aude

Merlí (Catalan pronunciation: [məɾˈli]) is a Catalan-language Spanish television series produced by TV3. The series is about the eponymous protagonist, a philosophy teacher who encourages students to think freely.

The series, created and written by Héctor Lozano and directed by Eduard Cortés, premiered on 14 September 2015 in prime time and reached a share of 17.7% with 566,000 viewers. The second season of the series premiered on TV3 on 19 September 2016 and ended on 12 December 2016, and the series' third and final season began airing on 18 September 2017 and ended on 15 January 2018.

Each episode is named after a different philosopher or school of thought. Influenced by films like Dead Poets Society, Merlí attempts to bring philosophy to the public. Each episode includes the approaches of a great thinker or school, such as the Peripatetics, Nietzsche or Schopenhauer, linking their teachings with fictional events and characters. The theme song is a version of "Flight of the Bumblebee".

The first season was dubbed into Castilian Spanish by the company Atresmedia and broadcast on the television channel La Sexta from April to June 2016. In November 2016, the American company Netflix bought the rights for the distribution of the series. The three seasons of the series are available on Netflix in Spain, the United States, and Latin America (although Netflix lost the license in December 2020).

A spinoff entitled Merlí: Sapere Aude premiered on Movistar+ on 5 December 2019.

== Plot ==
=== Season 1 (2015) ===
The main character of the series is Merlí Bergeron, an unemployed philosophy teacher who after being evicted from his apartment is forced to live with his mother. He also will have to take care of his son Bruno, who until then was living with his mother, Merlí's ex-wife. After Bruno arrives, Merlí is hired in Àngel Guimerà High School. There, with his unpredictable and unorthodox methods, Merlí will make the students think and express their opinions, and also will help them with their problems, even in a censurable way. He will not only explain about Socrates, Schopenhauer, Hume or Nietzsche, but also will apply their ideas and teachings to solve the problems he finds.

His students, whom he dubs "peripatetics", are a very diverse group that must face all kinds of situations: Pol, a repeater that soon gets along with Merlí; Berta, a student who does not like Merlí at first; Marc, a friendly, nice guy; Ivan, a boy who suffers from agoraphobia and does not dare to leave home; Tània, an extroverted girl and Bruno's best friend; Gerard, a boy who is prone to fall in love and will ask Merlí for advice; Joan, a studious, shy boy with a very strict family; Mònica, a new, very mature student; Oliver, another new boy; and finally, Bruno, Merlí's son and his most difficult student.

=== Season 2 (2016) ===
The second year of Batxillerat begins at Àngel Guimerà High School. The students welcome Merlí as he enters the school. The "peripatetics" have matured a bit, but in essence they are still the same happy, insecure teenagers from the first season. There is also a new student, Oksana, who will create new relationships inside the group.

In the teachers' room, however, Merlí is not so warmly welcomed. Although Eugeni is waiting for him and wishing to quarrel, both find a common adversary, Coralina, the new history teacher and head teacher. This strict, disciplinarian, 60-year-old professor is determined to impose her standards and will clash with the entire staff. Meanwhile, Merlí teaches in ways even more unorthodox than during the first season. He even takes the class outside of school. Any setting, even the mall, can help him explain the Cynic philosophers, the Stoics, Descartes, Hobbes or the Presocratics. New philosophers are featured this season, such as Hipparchia of Maroneia.

=== Season 3 (2017–2018) ===
After the Christmas holidays, the students return to class. The second year of Batxillerat (last year of high school before university) continues for Merlí and the "peripatetics". Everyone is aware high school is ending and the Selectivitat exam (necessary to enter university) and university are approaching.

In the classroom, some of the plots from the previous season continue: Pol and Tània will have to define their relationship, Joan and Gerard have become close friends, Marc must decide whether his father can return home, and Óscar, Pol's elder brother, will become involved in Oksana's motherhood.

In the teacher's room, there will be changes. Eugeni is the new director, and new teachers arrive. Gabi is the new Spanish literature teacher, but Merlí is more interested in Silvana, the new history teacher, who is very well received by the staff. Merlí is thrilled by the arrival of the new teacher, who is as creative as he is, but after he sees that his students think highly of her, he becomes jealous. Nevertheless, Merlí will continue to teach philosophy with his peculiar style, gaining the esteem of the "peripatetics". The philosophers featured in this season include Hannah Arendt, Kierkegaard, Albert Camus, Karl Marx and Augustine of Hippo.

== Characters ==
The characters in the series can be divided into three groups: students, teachers and family.

=== Teachers ===
- Francesc Orella as Merlí Bergeron. 55 years old, Merlí is a philosophy professor with his own set of ethics and a promiscuous sex life. After being thrown out of his apartment and forced to live with his mother, he finds employment working as a teacher in the Àngel Guimerà Institute, where his son Bruno studies. He is shown to have a dark sense of humor and a taste for irony, which the other teachers tend to find irritating, but the students adore him. They find him original, fun, and stimulating. Merlí has a son, Bruno, who is 16 years old. When Bruno's mother goes to live in Rome pursuing her career and love life, she leaves Bruno to live with his father, and the two find themselves having to reconcile despite their arguments and differences. Merlí's tendency to speak his mind and to do things his own way causes many around him, including his son, to be uncomfortable.
- Pere Ponce as Eugeni Bosc. Eugeni is the Catalan Literature and Language professor and is the chief of studies. He is around Merlí's age, and he considers himself a remarkable teacher – until Merlí comes along and leaves Eugeni in his shadow. Eugeni is Merlí's antithesis: He is a traditional teacher who does his job in a conventional way – the complete opposite of Merlí. Eugeni's students do not get along well with him, dubbing him “Hitler”, due to his strict nature and harsh relationship with his students. Eugeni can't stand Merlí and is jealous of his charisma and popularity as well as of his ability to get away with anything. In the second season, Eugeni is replaced by Coralina as chief of studies, and his and Merlí's mutual dislike for her leads to a sort of alliance between the two former enemies.
- Pau Durà as Toni. (Seasons 1-2) Toni is the director of the Àngel Guimerà Institute. He is a widower, is responsible, and likes his job. Toni aims for the institute to work smoothly and to have as few conflicts as possible between the students, teachers, and parents. The teachers’ complaints about Merlí, his methods, and his personality make it difficult for Toni to keep peace in the institute. Toni is also a math teacher and is generally well-liked by the students. He makes an effort to appreciate every teacher and to respect their differences.
- Pep Jové as Santi. (Season 1) Santi is the professor of Spanish Literature and Language. He is about 50 years old and is portrayed as a likable and kind teacher who appreciates his job and is welcoming to everyone. It is in the institute that he met his wife, Glòria, an art teacher. He likes Merlí a lot and finds him interesting and original. Santi is overweight, and he is verbally bullied by some of the students, especially Bruno. However, Santi always wears his weight with pride. At the end of the first season, he dies from a heart attack, leaving Bruno filled with regret and guilt.
- Assun Planas as Glòria. Glòria is Santi's wife and is the professor of Technical and Plastic Art. She likes her job and knows how to gain the students’ respect. Although hesitant at first about Merlí, she warms up to him. A talented artist, she helps Merlí by giving him a drawing of Berta for one of his schemes.
- Patrícia Bargalló as Mireia. Mireia is the Latin teacher. She has two sons, and she worries about them a lot during work, because their father does not spend much effort ensuring their well-being. She's unsatisfied with her marriage and finds herself attracted to Eugeni.
- Mar del Hoyo as Laia. (Season 1) Laia is the English teacher. She is 27 years old and is kind and passionate about animals, especially dogs. She's very attractive and is dating the Physical Education (PE) teacher, Albert. She is one of the first members of the staff to defend Merlí. In the second season, she leaves the institute and is replaced by Elisenda.
- Rubén de Eguía as Albert. (Season 1) Albert is the PE teacher. He is 27 years old and is kind to everyone. He does not appear in the second season.
- Pepa López as Coralina. (Season 2) She is about 60 years old, is very conservative, and has few friends. In the second season she joins the institute as chief of studies, replacing Eugeni, and is the professor of Spanish History. Coralina has her own way of doing things, and she shows little understanding of those who think differently than she does. One of these people is Merlí, and from the first season, the two of them are at odds. She is very strict and dedicated to her work and values.
- Ferran Rañé as Manuel Millán. (Season 2) Known by all simply as Millán, he is the new teacher of Spanish literature and language after Santi. He is 62 years old and is a good teacher. He gains his students’ respect when he first meets them. He becomes Gloria's friend.
- Sandra Monclús as Elisenda. (Seasons 2–3) Elisenda is the new English teacher after Laia. About 40 years old, it seems that she does not like her job, and she disappears from the Institute as soon as she can. She is an avid supporter of the Catalan independence movement.
- Manel Barceló as Quima. (Seasons 2–3) Quima is a transgender woman who acts as the substitute English teacher when Elisenda takes sick leave. Upon her arrival, she is immediately befriended by Merlí. She is self-assured and gains the respect of the students quickly, much to Coralina's dismay.
- Carlota Olcina as Silvana. (Season 3) Silvana is the new history teacher in the third season, replacing Coralina. She was already a teacher at the Àngel Guimerà some years before, and some of the "peripatetics" know her from her time as a social science teacher during lower secondary education. Everyone is delighted at her return. Eugeni thinks highly of her, and Merlí is thrilled by her when she meets her, because he thinks they are alike. Silvana is as creative as Merlí, entertaining and close to the students, and is also ambitious by nature.
- Pau Vinyals as Gabriel 'Gabi' Morales. (Season 3) Gabi is the Literature teacher, first appearing in the third season. His youthful appearance and energy lead to him being mistaken for a student when he first arrives. Though neurotic and a borderline hypochondriac, Gabi seeks to get the most out of life and actively searches for new and exciting experiences. He is attracted to Elisenda and pretends to support the independence movement in an effort to win her affections.

=== Students ===
- David Solans as Bruno Bergeron. Bruno is Merlí's son. For him, it is complicated having his father in class teaching in front of his friends. He is an extroverted kid, with a sense of irony inherited from his father and grandmother. He has also learned from his father to be non-conforming and to complain about things, so he forgets discretion. Bruno starts a new life when his mother moves to Rome and leaves him to live with his father, with whom he has a complicated relationship. Bruno is gay and in love with Pol, a good friend of his. He gets along well with the majority of the students, especially Tània, his best friend. They are inseparable and trust each other with everything. Bruno feels like he can be himself around Tània. After talking to Oliver at the end of the first season, he comes out of the closet and begins a new life being openly gay.
- Carlos Cuevas as Pol Rubio. Pol is 18 years old and has repeated two courses. He is the popular guy at school, and all the girls seem to want to be with him. He is also somewhat cold and manipulative, saying he has never been in love and does not plan on it, but using relationships for sex, as is the case with Berta Prats. Pol has many issues with his home life. He lives with his grandmother, father, and brother in the majority of the first season. His family doesn't have a lot of money, and Pol suffers from having a bad relationship with his brother and father as well as missing his mother, who died when he was young. After getting involved with Bruno on numerous occasions, his sexual orientation begins to be discussed and questioned.
- Candela Antón as Berta Prats. Berta is an extroverted girl uninterested in her classes. She is the ultimate attention-seeker, willing to do anything for the spotlight to be on her, even if it means morally ambiguous actions. She often feels alone, but acts strong. She spends her classes drawing on her desk, and it seems to be the only thing she's interested in. Berta's a smart girl, daring and misunderstood. She feels a lack of love from her family, and looks for it in relationships with boys like Pol Rubio. Like all other teenagers, she's searching for her place in the world.
- Albert Baró as Joan Capdevila. Joan is a kindhearted and shy teenage boy dealing with immense pressure from his family, particularly from his father. He lacks a sense of self-confidence, and his shyness is evident from the way he talks and moves. He is mild in every sense of the word, humble, attentive, calm, and responsible. It seems like nothing he does is enough to satisfy his father, and gains the help of Merlí to try to change the way he is perceived and treated. He admires Merlí and his classes.
- Adrian Grösser as Marc Vilaseca. Marc is everyone's friend. He doesn't get himself into any teenage drama and is the joker of the class. He likes being liked and having his place in the group. He is responsible with his studies and knows with certainty that he wants to become an actor. He is a player, and often flirts, but with varying levels of success. His best friend is Pol. He skates to school and has a younger brother, Pau, who he loves and cares about a lot.
- Marcos Franz as Gerard Piguillem. Gerard is an unsatisfied teenager. He has never had everything he has wanted, and is frustrated by the fact. He is extroverted, and unsure of what to do with his life, although he is often encouraged by his mother. He falls in love easily, and in the first season rapidly proclaims that he is in love with the new student, Monica. Gerard is easily bothered and constantly wants to prove his worth. His mother is overprotective and he is immature. He has a blog where he occasionally posts videos talking about his life.
- Pau Poch as Ivan Blasco. Ivan spends his days locked up in his room, refusing to leave the house. He lives alone with his mother, who doesn't know what to do with him. Eventually Merlí starts visiting him at his house to give him classes and convince him that his agoraphobia is not permanent, investing time and effort into getting Ivan to be comfortable facing the outdoors alone and going back to school despite his initial refusal to do so and his disliking for the idea of getting a psychiatrist. Merlí attempts to get Ivan to change his habits, and Ivan learns to think outside of the news stories he loves to read online and about his own life.
- Júlia Creus as Mònica de Villamore. Monica is a new student that entered the institute half-way through the year. She comes from a good family, but her parents have been separated since she was 10 years old. She is often told she looks more mature than she actually is, both physically and in her way of speaking and acting. Both Joan and Gerard are in love with her.
- Elisabet Casanovas as Tània Illa. Incredibly kind and understanding, Tània is very extroverted, respectful, and idealist. The most satisfying aspect of her life is her friendship with others. She is a dedicated friend, especially to Bruno, with whom she is inseparable. She loves to live in the moment, and has a good time in the institute. She would like to be a teacher one day, like her mother. Tània is very self-conscious about her body, and believes that it is not ideal and not what boys her age find attractive. She thinks she appears cute and nice to them, but not hot or sexually appealing. Tània is naive and a dreamer, idealizing the idea of love. Being upset with her is practically impossible.
- Iñaki Mur as Oliver Grau. Oliver is a confident student. He is proudly gay, and considers himself to be likable and agreeable. He doesn't worry about what people think of him. He has many issues with his family, but gives off a content and carefree appearance at school. He helps Bruno come out of the closet in the end of season one.
- Laia Manzanares as Oksana Casanoves (Seasons 2–3), a new student in the second season. She is adopted and originally from Ukraine. The girls in the school admire her and the boys find her attractive. From the beginning, she takes interest in Gerard, who only has eyes for Monica. She thinks she can help him get over her. Oksana likes to get involved with people, and she likes to show that she is more experiences than many of the other students both in sex and relationships as well is in understanding feelings and emotions. In the last chapters of the running last season, she seems, due to some other things happening to her, to become more eager to know more about her biological mother and her origins in Ukraine.
- Cristina Colom as Diana.
- Albert Bufill as Enric.
- Clàudia Puntí as Laura.
- Pol Hermoso as Uri.
- Marc Arias as Xavi.
- Rick Baster as student.

=== Family ===
- Anna M. Barbany as Carmina Calduch, Merlí's mother and Bruno's grandmother. She is a well-known actress, having worked in movies, television, and, especially, theatre. It is while acting that she feels genuinely happy. Everybody knows her as “La Calduch”.
- Marta Marco as Gina Castells, Gerard's mother, and Merlí's eventual love interest.
- Jordi Martínez as Jaume Capdevila, Joan's overprotective and somewhat obsessive father. In the first season, we learn that he has cancer.
- Victòria Pagès as Aurèlia Bonet, Joan's mother, who makes more of an effort to understand and help him than Jaume does.
- Anna Ycobalzeta as Míriam Blasco, Ivan's mother. She gets involved with both Merlí and Pol during the second season. She loves her son more than anything else in the world and runs a bar.
- Marta Domingo as Elsa García. Elsa is Berta's mother. She seems to always show a preference for Berta's sister, which takes a toll on Berta. She is a hairdresser and owns her own salon.
- Marta Calvó as Bàrbara, Bruno's mother. She moves to Rome in the beginning of the series.
- Asunción Balaguer as Pol and Óscar's grandmother.
- Oriol Pla as Óscar, Pol's brother. Óscar prefers to take his dad's side over his brother's. He is a hard worker who was forced to abandon his studies to provide for the family when his mother died.
- Carlos Vicente as Enric, Oliver's father.
- Boris Ruiz as Alfonso Rubio. He is Pol and Óscar's father. He is 55 years old and bitter over the loss of his wife. He forces his sons to work to pay the bills.
- Anna Barrachina as Lídia, Marc and Pau's mother. She is a nurse with little time to care for her sons.
- León Martínez as Pau Vilaseca, Marc's younger brother. He has troubles in his studies with nearly all of his teachers and is a complicated child. It is suggested by Silvana that he may have ADHD.
- Cristina Genebat as Anna, Oliver's mother. She still has not gotten over the death of her other son, Edgar. She is obsessed with Edgar and has a bad relationship with Oliver.

== Episodes ==
=== Season 1 ===
No. overall	No. in season	Title	English title	Broadcast date	Viewers	Share
1	1	"Els Peripatètics"	"The Peripatetics"	September 14, 2015	566,000	17.7%
2	2	"Plató"	"Plato"	September 21, 2015	544,000	18.2%
3	3	"Maquiavel"	"Machiavelli"	September 28, 2015	556,000	16.7%
4	4	"Aristòtil"	"Aristotle"	October 5, 2015	591,000	19.3%
5	5	"Sòcrates"	"Socrates"	October 12, 2015	559,000	18.8%
6	6	"Schopenhauer"	"Schopenhauer"	October 19, 2015	538,000	17.0%
7	7	"Foucault"	"Foucault"	October 26, 2015	459,000	15.2%
8	8	"Guy Debord"	"Guy Debord"	November 2, 2015	555,000	19.1%
9	9	"Epicur"	"Epicurus"	November 9, 2015	559,000	18.3%
10	10	"Els escèptics"	"The Skeptics"	November 16, 2015	577,000	19.6%
11	11	"Els sofistes"	"The Sophists"	November 23, 2015	610,000	20.5%
12	12	"Hume"	"Hume"	November 30, 2015	592,000	19.9%
13	13	"Nietzsche"	"Nietzsche"	December 7, 2015	591,000	19.4%

=== Season 2 ===
No. overall	No. in season	Title	English title	Broadcast date	Viewers	Share
14	1	"Els Presocràtics"	"The Pre-Socratics"	September 19, 2016	577,000	22.5%
15	2	"Thomas Hobbes"	"Thomas Hobbes"	September 26, 2016	527,000	22.5%
16	3	"Els estoics"	"The Stoics"	October 3, 2016	559,000	21.3%
17	4	"Kant"	"Kant"	October 10, 2016	511,000	19.1%
18	5	"Hipàrquia"	"Hipparchia of Maroneia"	October 17, 2016	524,000	18.8%
19	6	"Montaigne"	"Montaigne"	October 24, 2016	461,000	17.8%
20	7	"Judith Butler"	"Judith Butler"	October 31, 2016	308,000	13.1%
21	8	"Freud"	"Freud"	November 7, 2016	541,000	19.8%
22	9	"Descartes"	"Descartes"	November 14, 2016	531,000	19.6%
23	10	"Engels"	"Engels"	November 21, 2016	578,000	22.3%
24	11	"Zizek"	"Žižek"	November 28, 2016	562,000	20.2%
25	12	"El taoisme"	"Taoism"	December 5, 2016	389,000	15.2%
26	13	"Boeci"	"Boethius"	December 12, 2016	599,000	21.1%

=== Season 3 ===
No. overall	No. in season	Title	English title	Broadcast date	Viewers	Share
27	1	"Walter Benjamin"	"Walter Benjamin"	September 18, 2017	510,000	17.4%
28	2	"Adam Smith"	"Adam Smith"	September 25, 2017	449,000	18.3%
29	3	"Albert Camus"	"Albert Camus"	October 2, 2017	528,000	16.5%
30	4	"Karl Marx"	"Karl Marx"	October 9, 2017	456,000	15.4%
31	5	"Hannah Arendt"	"Hannah Arendt"	October 23, 2017	496,000	16.4%
32	6	"Kierkegaard"	"Kierkegaard"	October 30, 2017	530,000	18.5%
33	7	"Thoreau"	"Thoreau"	November 6, 2017	507,000	17.6%
34	8	"Plotí"	"Plotinus"	November 13, 2017	530,000	18.0%
35	9	"Zygmunt Bauman"	"Zygmunt Bauman"	November 20, 2017	491,000	16.2%
36	10	"Heidegger"	"Heidegger"	November 27, 2017	468,000	15.8%
37	11	"Hegel"	"Hegel"	December 4, 2017	598,000	19.5%
38	12	"Sant Agustí"	"St. Augustine"	December 11, 2017	437,000	15.4%
39	13	"Els Peripatètics del segle XXI"	"The Peripatetics of the 21st Century"	January 8, 2018	542,000	17.4%
40	14	"Merlí Bergeron"	"Merlí Bergeron"	January 15, 2018	693,000	23.6%

== Spin-off ==
A spin-off series titled Merlí: Sapere Aude, centering on Carlos Cuevas' character Pol Rubio attending university, premiered on Movistar+ on 5 December 2019.
