= Elena Gadel =

Spanish singer

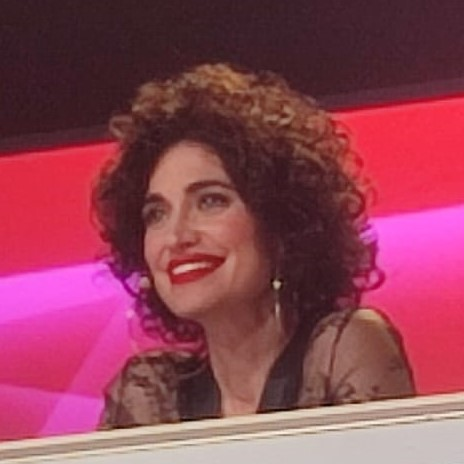
- 2023, Sant Joan Despí
- Born: Elena Delgado Ucea; October 29, 1982 (age 43); Barcelona
- Occupation: Singer

Elena Gadel (born in Barcelona on 29 October 1982) is a Catalan singer.

== Early life and education ==
Gadel was born in Barcelona from parents from Granada and Estremadura. She loved music and started performing at a very young age.

== TV beginnings and theatre ==
Gadel rose to fame at age 19 after participating in the second edition of the Spanish talent show Operacion Triunfo. During the program she was noticed by a producer from Vale Music and offered to record her debut single "Es Por Ti" in 2002.

In 2003 she joined fellow OT contestants Tessa and Marey and formed the group Lunae.

In 2004, she starred in the Catalan musical Mar i Cel as lead character Blanca, for the celebration of the 30th anniversary of the theatre company Dagoll Dagom. For this role Gadel was awarded the Best actress award at the Spanish Theatre Awards.

In 2006, she played the role of Rizzo in the Spanish production of Grease at the Teatre Victòria in Barcelona and then in various locations in Spain, leaving the production in 2008.

Gadel portrayed the Rose in the catalan musical El Petit Príncep (The Little Prince) in 2014 and 2016 in Barcelona.

Year	Title	Role	Theatre
2006	Mar i Cel	Blanca	
2006	Grease	Rizzo	Teatre Victòria
2012	Over the moon		
2014, 2016	El Petit Príncep	The Rose	
2015	Guapos i Pobres		Teatre Goya
2017	Cabaret	Sally Bowles	Teatre Victòria
2020-2021	El Màgic d'Oz	The Wicked Witch of the West	Teatre Condal

== Other ventures ==
In 2022 and 2023, Gadel was part of the jury of the TV3 show Eufòria.

== Discography ==
- Es Por Ti (2003)
- Tocant Fusta (2011)

== Filmography ==
=== Film ===
Year	Title	Role	Notes
2006	Mar i Cel	Blanca	TV movie
2007	Atrapats pel cap d'any	Performer	TV movie
2020	Flor de nit en concert	Rosa	
2020	The Barcelona Vampiress	Princesa Opereta	
2021	Hotel Malángel		Short
2022	Lildami: Supermercat		Music Video
2024	El rei Peret	Sara Montiel	TV movie

=== Television ===
Year	Title	Role	Notes
2004	Operacion Triunfo	Self	TV show (10 episodes)
2009	Crackòvia	Performer	TV series (1 episode)
2010	No me la puc treure del cap	Performer	TV series (1 episode)
2013	Ànima	Performer	TV series (1 episode)
2016	Merlí	Performer	TV series (1 episode)
2017-	Com si fos ahir	Noe	TV series (224 episodes)
