= Cristina Almeida =

Spanish lawyer and politician

María Cristina Almeida Castro
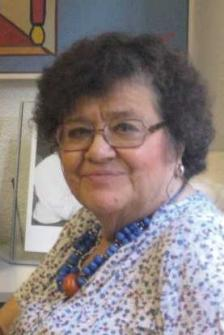

Personal details
- Born: 24 July 1944 (age 81) Badajoz, Spain

María Cristina Almeida Castro (born 24 July 1944 in Badajoz) is a Spanish lawyer and politician.

Cristina Almeida studied law in the Complutense University of Madrid and has been an active labour and feminist lawyer. Cristina has formed part of several political parties: the Communist Party of Spain (PCE), United Left (IU), New Left and the Spanish Socialist Workers' Party (PSOE). Cristina has also written La mujer y el mundo del trabajo (1982) and as a councillor for the PCE in Madrid, became involved in the controversy surrounding the publication of "El libro rojo del cole."

After her term on Madrid's City Council, she was elected to the Spanish Congress of Deputies in 1989 representing the Province of Madrid and served until 1993. She later on returned to Congress in 1996 for the same district, however, following disputes with the IU leader, Julio Anguita, she left IU in 1997 and resigned her seat in Congress in 1999. That same year, after joining the PSOE, Cristina was elected to the Madrid Assembly and was chosen to serve in the Spanish Senate from 1999 to 2003.
