= List of Spanish films of 2013 =

A list of Spanish-produced and co-produced feature films released in Spain in 2013. When applicable, the domestic theatrical release date is favoured.

== Films ==
Release		Title (Domestic title)	Cast & Crew	Distribution label	Ref.
J A N U A R Y	11	The Squad (El páramo)	Director: Jaime Osorio Cast: Mauricio Navas, Andrés Castañeda, Alejandro Aguilar, Juan Pablo Barragán	Alta Classics	(Note: Co-production (65% Colombia- 25% Argentina - 10% Spain))
J A N U A R Y	11	Twice Born (Volver a nacer)	Director: Sergio Castellitto Cast: Penélope Cruz, Emile Hirsch, Sergio Castellitto, Jane Birkin	Alta Classics	(Note: Co-production (80% Italy – 20% Spain))
J A N U A R Y	11	The Dead Man and Being Happy (El muerto y ser feliz)	Director: Javier Rebollo Cast: José Sacristán, Roxana Blanco, Vicky Peña, Jorge Jellinek	Splendor Films	(Note: Co-production (70% Spain – 20% Argentina – 10% France))
J A N U A R Y	18	El corazón del roble	Director: Ricardo Ramón, Ángel Izquierdo	Barton Films	
J A N U A R Y	25	Picasso's Gang (La banda Picasso)	Director: Fernando Colomo Cast: Louise Monot, Stanley Weber, Raphaëlle Agogué, Ignacio Mateos	Alta Classics	
F E B R U A R Y	8	Mama (Mamá)	Director: Andrés Muschietti Cast: Jessica Chastain, Nikolaj Coster-Waldau, Megan Charpentier, Isabelle Nélisse, Javier Botet	Universal Pictures	(Note: Co-production (67% Canada – 33% Spain))
F E B R U A R Y	8	Muertos de amor	Director: Mikel Aguirresarobe Cast: Javier Veiga, Marta Hazas, Ramón Esquinas, Iván Massagué, Carmen Ruiz	Karrakela Films	
F E B R U A R Y	15	Blackie & Kanuto	Director: Francis Nielsen	Barton Films	(Note: Co-production (44% Spain – 28% France – 28% Italy))
M A R C H	1	Here and There (Aquí y allá)	Director: Antonio Méndez Esparza Cast: Lorena Guadalupe Pantaleón Vázquez, Teresa Ramírez Aguirre, Pedro de los Santos	A Contracorriente Films	(Note: Co-production (51% Spain – 49% United States))
M A R C H	1	Blind Alley (El callejón)	Director: Antonio Trashorras Cast: Ana de Armas	DeAPlaneta	(Note: Co-production (80% Spain – 20% Colombia))
M A R C H	8	I'm So Excited! (Los amantes pasajeros)	Director: Pedro Almodóvar Cast: Javier Cámara, Cecilia Roth, Lola Dueñas, Raúl Arévalo, Carlos Areces, José María Yazpik, Paz Vega, Miguel Ángel Silvestre	Warner Bros. Pictures	
M A R C H	15	Cold Call (A puerta fría)	Director: Xavi Puebla Cast: Antonio Dechent, María Valverde, José Luis García Pérez, Nick Nolte	Oliete Films	
M A R C H	27	The Last Days (Los últimos días)	Director: David Pastor, Àlex Pastor Cast: Quim Gutiérrez, José Coronado, Marta Etura, Leticia Dolera, Iván Massagué	Warner Bros. Pictures	(Note: Co-production (90% Spain – 10% France))
A P R I L	5	Thesis on a Homicide (Tesis sobre un homicidio)	Director: Hernán Goldfrid Cast: Ricardo Darín, Alberto Ammann, Calu Rivero, Arturo Puig	Universal Pictures	(Note: Co-production (63% Spain – 37% Argentina))
A P R I L	12	The Wishful Thinkers (Los ilusos)	Director: Jonás Trueba Cast: Francesco Carril, Aura Garrido, Vito Sanz, Mikele Urroz, Isabelle Stoffel	—N/a	
A P R I L	12	Scorpion in Love (Alacrán enamorado)	Director: Santiago Zannou Cast: Álex González, Judith Diakhate, Javier Bardem, Miguel Ángel Silvestre, Carlos Bardem	Alta Classics	
A P R I L	19	La venta del paraíso	Director: Emilio Ruiz Barrachina Cast: Ana Claudia Talancón, William Miller, Carlos Iglesias, Juanjo Puigcorbé, María Garralón	Selected Films	
A P R I L	19	Serie B	Director: Richard Vogue Cast: Cata Munar, Marta Simonet, Sonia Monroy, Roger Pera, Manuel Zarzo	Olwyn Films	
A P R I L	26	Yesterday Never Ends (Ayer no termina nunca)	Director: Isabel Coixet Cast: Javier Cámara, Candela Peña	A Contracorriente Films	
A P R I L	26	Apartment 143 (Emergo)	Director: Carles Torrens Cast: Francesc Garrido, Kai Lennox, Gia Mantegna, Rick Gonzalez	—N/a	(Note: Co-production (90% Spain – 10% United States))
M A Y	1	7 Boxes (7 cajas)	Director: Juan Carlos Maneglia, Tana Schémbori Cast: Celso Franco, Lali González	Vértigo Films	(Note: Co-production (80% Paraguay – 20% Spain))
M A Y	10	The Mule (La mula)	Director: Anonymous Cast: María Valverde, Mario Casas, Secun de la Rosa, Luis Callejo, Daniel Grao, Jorge Suquet, Pepa Rus	Wanda Visión	(Note: Co-production (67% Spain – 20% United Kingdom – 13% Ireland))
M A Y	17	Ali	Director: Paco R. Baños Cast: Nadia de Santiago, Verónica Forqué, Julián Villagrán, Adrián Lamana, Luis Marco		
M A Y	17	La última isla	Director: Dácil Pérez de Guzmán Cast: Carmen Sánchez, Julieta Serrano, Antonio Dechent	Splendor Films	
M A Y	24	Chaika	Director: Miguel Ángel Jiménez Cast: Salome Demuria, Gio Gabunia, Bachi Lezhava	—N/a	(Note: Co-production (80% Spain – 20% Georgia – 10% Russia))
M A Y	24	La Estrella	Director: Alberto Aranda Cast: Ingrid Rubio, Marc Clotet, Fele Martínez, Carmen Machi	Splendor Films	
M A Y	31	Son of Cain (Hijo de Caín)	Director: Jesús Monllaó Cast: José Coronado, David Solans, Julio Manrique, María Molins, Jack Taylor	Alfa Pictures	
J U N E	7	15 Years and One Day (15 años y un día)	Director: Gracia Querejeta Cast: Maribel Verdú, Tito Valverde, Arón Piper, Belén López, Susi Sánchez	Universal Pictures	
J U N E	7	Clara no es nombre de mujer	Director: Pepe Carbajo Cast: Jorge Sanz, Miriam Benoit, Juan Dorá, Esmeralda Moya, Jorge Perugorría, Juan Muñoz, Miriam Díaz-Aroca	World Line Cinema	
J U N E	14	Tasting Menu (Menú degustación)	Director: Roger Gual Cast: Jan Cornet, Claudia Bassols, Vicenta N'Dongo, Stephen Rea, Marta Torné, Fionnula Flanagan	Alfa Pictures	(Note: Co-production (77% Spain – 23% Ireland))
J U N E	14	We Are Honest People (Somos gente honrada)	Director: Alejandro Marzoa Cast: Unax Ugalde, Paco Tous, Manuela Vellés, Miguel de Lira, Manuel Lozano, Marisol Membrillo	Filmax	(Note: Co-production (80% Spain – 20% Portugal))
J U N E	14	Un dios prohibido	Director: Pablo Moreno Cast: Elena Furiase, Iñigo Etayo, Jacobo Muñoz	—N/a	
J U N E	14	Painless (Insensibles)	Director: Juan Carlos Medina Cast: Tómas Lemarquis, Àlex Brendemühl, Juan Diego, Ramon Fontserè, Sílvia Bel	A Contracorriente Films	(Note: Co-production (60% Spain – 30% France - 10% Portugal))
J U N E	21	La lapidation de saint Étienne	Director: Pere Vilà Cast: Lou Castel, Marie Payen, Luis Rego, Elsa Toro	Splendor Films	(Note: Co-production (51% Spain – 49% France))
J U N E	28	Encierro	Director: Olivier van der Zee	—N/a	
J U L Y	12	Sola contigo	Director: Alberto Lecchi Cast: Ariadna Gil, Leonardo Sbaraglia, Gonzalo Palenzuela, Sabrina Garciarena, Antonio Birabent	Splendor Films	
J U L Y	26	Three-60 (Tres 60)	Director: Alejandro Ezcurdia Cast: Raúl Mérida, Sara Sálamo, Joaquim de Almeida, Adam Jezierski, Manuel Morón, Guillermo Estrella, Geraldine Chaplin	Warner Bros. Pictures	
J U L Y	26	Colosio: El asesinato	Director: Carlos Bolado Cast: José María Yazpik, Daniel Giménez Cacho, Kate del Castillo, Odiseo Bichir	Splendor Films	(Note: Co-production (60% Mexico – 20% Spain – 10% Colombia – 10% France))
S E P T E M B E R	6	La plaga	Director: Neus Ballús	Noucinemart	
S E P T E M B E R	6	Barcelona Summer Night (Barcelona, nit d'estiu)	Director: Dani de la Orden Cast: Jan Cornet, Luis Fernández, Pau Roca, Bárbara Santa-Cruz, Àlex Monner, Alba Ribas, Claudia Vega	Splendor Films	
S E P T E M B E R	13	Family United (La gran familia española)	Director: Daniel Sánchez Arévalo Cast: Quim Gutiérrez, Antonio de la Torre, Verónica Echegui, Roberto Álamo, Miquel Fernández, Patrick Criado, Héctor Colomé	Warner Bros. Pictures	
S E P T E M B E R	13	Afterparty	Director: Miguel Larraya Cast: Luis Fernández, Alicia Sanz, Ana Caldas, Andrea Dueso, Rocío León, Juan Blanco, David Seijo, Úrsula Corberó, Pilar Rubio	Emon	
S E P T E M B E R	20	Justin and the Knights of Valour (Justin y la espada del valor)	Director: Manuel Sicilia	Sony Pictures	
S E P T E M B E R	20	Para Elisa	Director: Juanra Fernández Cast: Ana Turpin, Ona Casamiquela, Luisa Gavasa, Jesús Caba, Sheila Ponce	Splendor Films	
S E P T E M B E R	27	Witching & Bitching (Las brujas de Zugarramurdi)	Director: Álex de la Iglesia Cast: Hugo Silva, Mario Casas, Pepón Nieto, Carolina Bang, Terele Pávez, Jaime Ordóñez, Carmen Maura, Secun de la Rosa, Macarena Gómez	Universal Pictures	
S E P T E M B E R	27	Viaje a Surtsey	Director: Javier Asenjo, Miguel Ángel Pérez Cast: Raúl Fernández de Pablo, Lucas Fuica, Elisa Drabben, Lucas Utray	Karma Films	
O C T O B E R	4	Wounded (La herida)	Director: Fernando Franco Cast: Marian Álvarez, Ramón Barea, Manolo Solo, Rosana Pastor, Andrés Gertrudix, Ramón Agirre	Golem	
O C T O B E R	4	Zip & Zap and the Marble Gang (Zipi y Zape y el club de la canica)	Director: Oskar Santos Cast: Javier Gutiérrez, Daniel Cerezo, Raúl Rivas, Claudia Vega, Marcos Ruiz, Álex Angulo	Buena Vista International	
O C T O B E R	4	Gloria	Director: Sebastián Lelio Cast: Paulina García, Sergio Hernández, Diego Fontecilla, Fabiola Zamora, Coca Guazzini	Vértigo Films	(Note: Co-production (20% Spain – 80% Chile))
O C T O B E R	11	Cannibal (Caníbal)	Director: Manuel Martín Cuenca Cast: Antonio de la Torre, Olimpia Melinte, Alfonsa Rosso	Golem	
O C T O B E R	11	The German Doctor (El médico alemán)	Director: Lucía Puenzo Cast: Àlex Brendemühl, Alan Daicz, Natalia Oreiro, Florencia Bado, Diego Peretti, Guillermo Pfening, Elena Roger	Wanda Visión	
O C T O B E R	11	Mujer conejo	Director: Verónica Chen Cast: Haien Qiu, Luciano Cáceres, Gloria Carrá	Barton Films	
O C T O B E R	18	All the Women (Todas las mujeres)	Director: Mariano Barroso Cast: Eduard Fernández, Michelle Jenner, Nathalie Poza, Petra Martínez, María Morales	Avalon	
O C T O B E R	18	Nos veremos en el infierno	Director: Martín Garrido Barón Cast: Raúl Prieto, Valentín Paredes, Daniela Costa, Joan Pizà, Ruth Díaz	Pirámide Films	
O C T O B E R	25	Grand Piano	Director: Eugenio Mira Cast: Elijah Wood, John Cusack, Allen Leech, Tamsin Egerton, Dee Wallace, Kerry Bishé	Paramount Pictures	
O C T O B E R	25	We All Want What's Best for Her (Tots volem el millor per a ella)	Director: Mar Coll Cast: Nora Navas, Valeria Bertuccelli, Pau Durà, Àgata Roca	Alfa Pictures	
O C T O B E R	25	Blue Is the Warmest Colour (La vida de Adèle)	Director: Abdellatif Kechiche Cast: Léa Seydoux, Adèle Exarchopoulos	Vértigo Films	(Note: Co-production (10% Spain – 70% France – 20% Belgium))
O C T O B E R	31	Living Is Easy with Eyes Closed (Vivir es fácil con los ojos cerrados)	Director: David Trueba Cast: Javier Cámara, Natalia de Molina, Ariadna Gil, Jorge Sanz, Francesc Colomer, Ramon Fontserè	Universal Pictures	
O C T O B E R	31	Al final todos mueren	Director: Javier Fesser, Javier Botet, Roberto Pérez Toledo, Pablo Vara, David Galán Galindo Cast: Javier Botet, Elisa Mouliaá, Miguel Ángel Muñoz, Macarena Gómez, Alejandro Albarracín, Manuela Vellés, Andrea Duro	39 Escalones Films	
N O V E M B E R	8	Stockholm	Director: Rodrigo Sorogoyen Cast: Javier Pereira, Aura Garrido	Festival Films	
N O V E M B E R	8	7th Floor (Séptimo)	Director: Patxi Amezcua Cast: Belén Rueda, Ricardo Darín, Luis Ziembrowski, Jorge D'Elía, Osvaldo Santoro	Hispano Foxfilm	
N O V E M B E R	15	Who Killed Bambi? (¿Quién mató a Bambi?)	Director: Santi Amodeo Cast: Quim Gutiérrez, Julián Villagrán, Enrico Vecchi, Clara Lago, Úrsula Corberó, Ernesto Alterio	Sony Pictures	
N O V E M B E R	15	The Returned (Retornados)	Director: Manuel Carballo Cast: Emily Hampshire, Kris Holden-Ried, Shawn Doyle, Claudia Bassols, Melina Matthews	Filmax	
N O V E M B E R	15	The Kids from the Port (Los chicos del puerto)	Director: Alberto Morais Cast: Omar Krim Alapont, Blanca Bautista Díaz, Mikel Sarasa, José Luis de Madariaga, Ricardo Herrero, Pepa Juan	Barton Films	
N O V E M B E R	15	El pequeño mago	Director: Roque Cameselle	Barton Films	
N O V E M B E R	22	The Fear (La por)	Director: Jordi Cadenas Cast: Igor Szpakowski, Roser Camí, Ramon Madaula, Alícia Falcó	Splendor Films	
N O V E M B E R	29	Viral	Director: Lucas Figueroa Cast: Aura Garrido, Juan Blanco, Miguel Ángel Muñoz, Pablo Rivero, Pedro Casablanc, Dafne Fernández, Enrique Villén, Maxim Huerta, Amparo Valle	—N/a	
N O V E M B E R	29	Alaba Zintzoa	Director: Javier Rebollo, Alvar Gordejuela Cast: Leire Ucha, Ramón Agirre, Zorion Eguileor, Aitziber Garmendia	Barton Films	
N O V E M B E R	29	Diamantes negros	Director: Miguel Alcantud Cast: Hamidou Samake, Setigui Diallo, Carlo D'Ursi, Guillermo Toledo, Carlos Bardem	Splendor Films	
D E C E M B E R	5	Three Many Weddings (3 bodas de más)	Director: Javier Ruiz Caldera Cast: Inma Cuesta, Martiño Rivas, Quim Gutiérrez, Paco León, Berto Romero, Laura Sánchez, María Botto	Warner Bros. Pictures	
D E C E M B E R	20	People in Places (Gente en sitios)	Director: Juan Cavestany Cast: Eduard Fernández, Ernesto Alterio, Maribel Verdú, Irene Escolar, Adriana Ugarte, Carlos Areces, Raúl Arévalo	—N/a	
D E C E M B E R	20	Metegol (Futbolín)	Director: Juan José Campanella	Universal Pictures	
D E C E M B E R	25	Ismael	Director: Marcelo Piñeyro Cast: Larsson Do Amaral, Belén Rueda, Mario Casas, Sergi López, Juan Diego Botto, Ella Kweku	Sony Pictures	

== Box office ==
The five highest-grossing Spanish feature films in 2013, by domestic box office gross revenue, are as follows: (Note: While the ICAA executive briefing for 2013 includes Fast & Furious 6 in the list of highest-grossing Spanish films of 2013 (actually at the top of the list), secondary sources detailing the 2013 Spanish box-office do not count the film within the set of Spanish films released in 2013.)

Highest-grossing films of 2013
Rank	Title	Distributor	Admissions	Domestic gross (€)
1	Mama (Mamá)	Universal Pictures	1,160,401	7,869,703.59
2	Zip & Zap and the Marble Gang (Zipi y Zape y el club de la canica)	Buena Vista International	865,724	5,085,786.32
3	I'm So Excited (Los amantes pasajeros)	Warner Bros. Pictures	706,378	5,018,755.62
4	Witching & Bitching (Las brujas de Zugarramurdi)	Universal Pictures	802,514	4,729,558.41
5	Three Many Weddings (3 bodas de más)	Warner Bros. Pictures	632,251	4,265,420.43
6	The Body (El cuerpo) ‡	Sony Pictures	497,277	3,311,157.27
7	Family United (La gran familia española)	Warner Bros. Pictures	462,262	2,968,829.15
8	7th Floor (Séptimo)	Hispano Foxfilm	470,287	2,935,308.57
9	Justin and the Knights of Valour (Justin y la espada del valor)	Sony Pictures	392,552	2,316,378.56
10	The Last Days (Los últimos días)	Warner Bros. Pictures	300,754	2,123,599.13
‡: 2012 theatrical opening

== See also ==
- 28th Goya Awards
- List of 2013 box office number-one films in Spain
