= 6th Gaudí Awards =

- Date: 2 February 2014
- Site: Barcelona Teatre Musical, Barcelona, Spain
- Hosted by: Àngel Llàcer
- Organized by: Catalan Film Academy

Highlights
- Most awards: The Last Days (7)
- Most nominations: The Last Days (11)

Television coverage
- Network: XAL
- Viewership: 0.24 million (6.6%)

The 6th Gaudí Awards ceremony, presented by the Catalan Film Academy, was held at the Barcelona Teatre Musical in Barcelona on 2 February 2014. The gala was hosted by Àngel Llàcer.

== Background ==
The nominations were read by Lolo Herrero and Lluïsa Castell from La Pedrera on 3 January 2014. The awards ceremony took place on 2 February 2014 at the Barcelona Teatre Musical (BTM) and it was hosted by Àngel Llàcer.

The linear television broadcast on BTV and other local stations of the XAL network commanded 242,000 viewers (6.6% audience share). The ceremony did not air on the customary broadcaster TV3 due to the strike called by TVC workers.

== Winners and nominees ==
The winners and nominees are listed as follows:

Best Film: The Plague; Son of Cain; Barcelona Summer Night; We All Want What's Best for Her	Bet Non-Catalan Language Film: The Last Days; The Body; The Dead Man and Being Happy; Grand Piano
Best Director: Neus Ballús — The Plague; Àlex Pastor, David Pastor — The Last Days; Jordi Cadena — The Fear; Mar Coll — We All Want What's Best for Her	Best Screenplay: Neus Ballús, Pau Subirós — The Plague; Jordi Cadena, Núria Villazán — The Fear; Mar Coll, Valentina Viso — We All Want What's Best for Her; Àlex Pastor, David Pastor — The Last Days
Best Actress: Nora Navas — We All Want What's Best for Her; Candela Peña — Yesterday Never Ends; Ingrid Rubio — La Estrella; Vicky Peña — Un berenar a Ginebra	Best Actor: José Sacristán — The Dead Man and Being Happy; David Solans — Son of Cain; Eduard Fernández — All the Women; Javier Cámara — Yesterday Never Ends
Best Supporting Actress: Clara Segura — We All Want What's Best for Her; Àgata Roca — We All Want What's Best for Her; Carmen Machi — La Estrella; Maria Molins — Son of Cain	Best Supporting Actor: Ramon Madaula — The Fear; José Coronado — Son of Cain; Pau Durà — We All Want What's Best for Her; Sergi López — Ismael
Best Production Supervision: Josep Amorós — The Last Days; Aritz Cirbián — Otel·lo; Ivan S. Mas — Son of Cain; Oriol Maymó — Little World	Best Documentary Film: Little World; Bajarí; Els records glaçats; Serrat y Sabina, el símbolo y el cuate
Best European Film: Amour; Hannah Arendt; Wounded; Blue Is the Warmest Colour	Best Short Film: Godka Cirka; La gallina; Sequence; Wings
Best Television Film: Carta a Eva; Concepción Arenal, la visitadora de presons; Desclassificats; Olor de colònia	Best Art Direction: Balter Gallart — The Last Days; Alain Bainée — Mindscape; Sylvia Steinbrecht — Three Many Weddings; Sebastian Vogler, Mihnea Mihailescu — Story of My Death
Best Editing: Neus Ballús, Domi Parra — The Plague; Bernat Aragonés — Son of Cain; David Gallart — The Fear; Elena Ruiz, Alberto Gutiérrez — Barcelona Summer Night	Best Cinematography: Daniel Aranyó — The Last Days; Diego Dussuel — The Plague; Sergi Gallardo — The Fear; Jimmy Gimferrer — Story of My Death
Best Original Music: Joan Dausà — Barcelona Summer Night; Víctor Reyes — Grand Piano; Pau Vallvé — Little World; Fernando Velázquez — The Last Days	Best Costume Design: Lourdes Pérez, Rosa Tharrats — Story of My Death; Núria Anglada — Son of Cain; Patricia Monné — Grand Piano; Olga Rodal — The Last Days
Best Sound: Licio Marcos de Oliveira, Oriol Tarragó, David Calleja — The Last Days; Albert Manera, Isaac Bonfill, Oscar Grau, Marc Orts — Son of Cain; Albert Manera, James Muñoz José A. Manovel — Grand Piano; Albert Manera, Oriol Tarragó, David Calleja — The Body	Best Makeup and Hairstyles: Patricia Reyes — The Last Days; Laura Bruy, Txus González — We All Want What's Best for Her; Ana López-Puigcerver, Belén López-Puigcerver — Grand Piano; Mariona Trias, Lluís Soriano — Story of My Death
Best Digital/Special Effects: Lluís Rivera, Pablo Perona, Juanma Nogales, Jon Aguirre, Manuel Ramírez, Isidro Jiménez — The Last Days; Lluís Castells, Lluís Rivera, David Martí, Montse Ribé — The Body; Àlex Villagrasa, Raul Romanillos — Grand Piano; Mister X, Cúbica User T38, David Martí, Montse Ribé — Mama

=== Films with multiple nominations and awards ===
Films with multiple nominations
Nominations	Film
11	The Last Days
8	We All Want What's Best for Her
8	Son of Cain
6	Grand Piano
5	The Plague
5	The Fear
4	Story of My Death
3	Barcelona Summer Night
3	Little World
3	The Body
2	Yesterday Never Ends
2	The Dead Man and Being Happy
2	La Estrella

Films with multiple awards
Awards	Film
7	The Last Days
4	The Plague
2	We All Want What's Best for Her

== Honorary Award ==
Actress Julieta Serrano was the recipient of the Gaudí honorary award.
