= Mirage (2018 film) =

2018 mystery film directed by Oriol Paulo

- Theatrical release poster
- Spanish: Durante la tormenta
- Directed by: Oriol Paulo
- Written by: Oriol Paulo; Lara Sendim
- Produced by: Mercedes Gamero; Mikel Lejarza; Eneko Lizarraga; Jesus Ulled Nadal
- Starring: Adriana Ugarte; Chino Darín; Javier Gutiérrez; Álvaro Morte; Nora Navas
- Cinematography: Xavi Giménez
- Edited by: Jaume Martí
- Music by: Fernando Velázquez
- Production companies: Atresmedia Cine; Colosé Producciones; Mirage Studio; Think Studio
- Distributed by: Warner Bros. Pictures
- Release date: November 30, 2018
- Running time: 128 minutes
- Country: Spain
- Language: Spanish

Mirage (Spanish: Durante la tormenta) is a 2018 Spanish mystery-drama film co-written and directed by Oriol Paulo. It stars Adriana Ugarte, Chino Darín, alongside Álvaro Morte, Javier Gutiérrez and Nora Navas.

== Plot ==
In 1989, during the fall of the Berlin Wall and a 72-hour-long electrical storm, a boy named Nico, while recording a video in his house, hears some noises and sees a fight scene in his neighbors' house through a window. He goes to the house only to find the body of Ms. Weiss, the wife of the neighbor Angel Prieto. Seeing Mr. Prieto with a knife, Nico tries to escape and is accidentally hit by a car on the road. Prieto is arrested with the murder weapon in hand as Nico dies in the car accident.

In 2014, a married couple, Vera Roy and David Ortiz, move to Nico's house along with their daughter Gloria. They find an old TV set in a storeroom along with a video recorder and cassettes. An electrical storm similar to the one in 1989 begins, and after Vera, David, and Gloria watch Nico's video, the TV starts broadcasting the live news that was taking place when Nico was making his video. During dinner, they share this incident with their neighbor and now friend Aitor, who was Nico's friend, and his mother Clara. Vera and David learn from Aitor how Nico was killed. At night, Vera wakes up and sees the boy on the TV and is shocked to find that she can interact with him. Initially she's scared, but then tries to warn Nico not to go out on the road so he will not get hit.

The next morning, Vera wakes up to a new reality where no one other than she is aware of the above incidents. David is married to someone else. Gloria was never born. She is disturbed and starts to think that, if she can interact with Nico once again, she will be able to correct what she has done. She visits the police and tells them the entire story, which is difficult for anyone to believe. Inspector Leira tries to help her out, but he needs some proof in order to trust her. They visit the author of a book which narrates the story of Nico communicating with a woman from the future via the television. They learn that during the current storm, they can communicate with Nico and try to change things. As proof, Vera tells the inspector to dig and look for the body of Ms. Weiss beneath her husband's slaughterhouse. They do so and find a human skeleton in a suitcase. The police arrest Prieto, who is now living with Aitor and Clara. During the interrogation, it is also revealed that Angel Prieto and Clara were having an affair and were caught by Ms. Weiss, which led to a fight in which Clara accidentally stabbed Weiss. Inspector Leira helps Vera by giving her some credit card information about Nico and an address. When she visits this address, she is shocked to find David cheating on his wife with a nurse whom he met during his surgery. Vera blackmails David, who is a bank employee, to get information about Nico. It turns out that Inspector Leira is Nico Lasarte, and they have a relationship in this reality.

Leira tells her how he had waited for her for years and, in doing so, had unknowingly prevented her from meeting Aitor, and thereby David. Vera asks Leira to correct the events using the TV set and video recorder. Vera then commits suicide so that Leira will have to save her. Leira uses the TV and recorder to communicate with his childhood self.

Vera then wakes up to a new version of reality, which is like an earlier version where David is her husband and Gloria is her daughter, except that Nico is still alive. She finds out that David is still cheating on her. She calls the police to report a body beneath the slaughterhouse where she meets Inspector Leira, hoping to start a new relationship with him along with her daughter.

== Cast ==
- Adriana Ugarte as Dr Vera Roy, a neurosurgeon, David's ex-wife, Gloria's mother and Nico's girlfriend
- Chino Darín as Inspector Leira/Nico Lasarte, Maria Lasarte's son, Aitor's best friend, Vera's boyfriend
- Javier Gutiérrez as Ángel Prieto, Hilda Weiss's husband, Clara's 2nd husband, Aitor's adopted father
- Álvaro Morte as David Ortiz, Vera's ex-husband, Gloria's father, Ursula's ex-boyfriend
- Nora Navas as Clara Medina, Aitor's mother, Angel's 2nd wife
- Luna Fulgencio as Gloria Ortiz Roy
- Miquel Fernández as Aitor Medina, Clara's son, Nico's best friend, Vera and David's neighbour
- Francesc Orella as Doctor Fell
- Clara Segura as Hilda Weiss, Angel's deceased wife
- Silvia Alonso as Enfermera Mónica
- Aina Clotet as Úrsula Abad
- Ana Wagener as Inspector Dimas
- Belén Rueda as Dr. Karen Sardón
- Julio Bohigas-Couto as Nico Lasarte (Child)
- Marco de Francisco as Aitor Medina (Child)
- Ruth Llopis as Profesora Miranda
- Albert Pérez as Román
- Mima Riera as María Lasarte

== Release ==
Distributed by Warner Bros in Spain, the film was theatrically released on November 30, 2018. It was released on Netflix streaming on March 22, 2019.

== Reception ==
On review aggregator Rotten Tomatoes, Mirage has an approval rating of 71% based on seven reviews. Jonathan Holland from The Hollywood Reporter wrote: "Mirage has a great deal of satisfying complexity but little depth, and its dazzling, intricate machinery is always visible. But it still makes for a fun ride on a highly calibrated roller coaster." Pablo A. Scholz writing for the newspaper Clarín stated: "Maybe the duration is excessive (just over two hours), but the viewer will remain entertained. Janire Zurbano from the Spanish film magazine Cinemanía gave the movie two-and-a-half stars out of five and said: "[Director] Oriol Paulo succeeds in the emotional aspect, but slips in the thriller." Luis Martínez from Spanish newspaper El Mundo gave Mirage three out of five stars, concluding: "Beyond the exquisite labyrinth of lost looks, we can always be attentive to Adriana Ugarte's work, who is always at the edge." Javier Ocaña writing for El País disliked the movie and argued: "Oriol Paulo composes a commercial thriller of intrigue, of Hitchcockian airs, but that for his plot feeds on films of the contemporary cinema.

At the 2019 Gaudí Awards, Mirage was nominated for two awards, Best Actress in a Supporting Role (for Clara Segura) and Best Visual Effects.

== Remake ==
Indian filmmaker Anurag Kashyap adapted Mirage as the 2022 Hindi-language film Dobaaraa.

In 2025, filmmaker Dyan Sunu Prastowo released the Indonesian version titled Andaikan Kau Datang Kembali or If You Were Here Again starring Faradina Mufti, Vino G. Bastian and Muhammad Adhiyat. Set in 1998, the story follows a young boy who witnesses a murder on the eve of a massive storm and becomes a fugitive. Twenty-five years later, during another storm, a woman discovers a way to communicate with the boy just before the murder, preventing his death but triggering an unexpected consequence.

== See also ==
- List of Spanish films of 2018
