= 19th Forqué Awards =

2014 Spanish film awards

- Date: 13 January 2014
- Site: Palacio Municipal de Congresos, Madrid, Spain
- Hosted by: Ana Morgade
- Organized by: EGEDA

Highlights
- Best Picture: Wounded
- Best Actor: Eduard Fernández; All the Women
- Best Actress: Marian Álvarez; Wounded

Television coverage
- Network: La 2

The 19th Forqué Awards ceremony, presented by EGEDA, took place on 13 January 2014 at the Palacio Municipal de Congresos in Madrid. The gala, broadcast on La 2, was hosted by Ana Morgade.

== Background ==
Organised by EGEDA, the award ceremony was held at the Palacio Municipal de Congresos in Madrid on 13 January 2014. Filmmaker Pedro Almodóvar handed his brother, producer Agustín Almodóvar, the EGEDA Gold Medal in recognition to his contributions to the Spanish film industry. The speech of the Minister of Culture José Ignacio Wert was ostensibly booed during the ceremony.

Hosted by Ana Morgade, the gala featured musical performances by Pagagnini, Venidos a Menos and Al tran tran Impro.

== Winners and nominees ==
The winners and nominees are listed as follows:

Best Film: Wounded; 15 Years and One Day; The Body; Family United; Witching & Bitching; A Gun in Each Hand	Best Latin-American Film: The German Doctor (Argentina); Gloria (Chile); The Golden Dream (Mexico); Neighboring Sounds (Brazil); Blue and Not So Pink (Venezuela)
Best Male Performance in a Film: Eduard Fernández — All the Women; Antonio de la Torre — Cannibal; Javier Cámara — Living Is Easy with Eyes Closed	Best Female Performance in a Film: Marian Álvarez — Wounded; Aura Garrido — Stockholm; Nora Navas — We All Want What's Best for Her
Best Animation or Documentary Film: Justin and the Knights of Valour
