= Santuario (TV series) =

- Promotional release poster
- Created by: Manuel Bartual; Carmen Pacheco
- Written by: Manuel Bartual; Carmen Pacheco
- Directed by: Rodrigo Ruiz Gallardón; Zoe Berriatúa
- Starring: Aura Garrido; Lucía Guerrero
- Music by: Javier Colmen
- Country of origin: Spain
- Original language: Spanish

Production
- Executive producers: Montse García; Rodrigo Ruiz-Gallardón
- Producers: Álex de la Iglesia; Carolina Bang
- Cinematography: Alberto Morango
- Production companies: Atresmedia TV; Pokeepsie Films

Original release
- Network: Atresplayer
- Release: 22 December 2024 – present

Santuario is a Spanish dystopian thriller television series created and written by Manuel Bartual and Carmen Pacheco based on their podcast of the same name. It stars Aura Garrido and Lucía Guerrero.

== Plot ==
Set in a dystopian future, the plot follows a three-month pregnant woman as she enter 'Santuario', a closed place where women carry their pregnancies after a climate disaster.

== Cast ==
- Aura Garrido as Valle
- Lucía Guerrero as Pilar
- Jaime Ordóñez
- Mélida Molina
- Alba Ribas
- Songa Park
- Nina Minelli
- Eve Ryan
- Blanca Valletbó
- Joan Sentís
- Juan Viadas
- Borja Luna
- Godeliv Van Der Brandt
- Melina Matthews
- Manu Fullola

== Production ==
Santuario is based on the 2021 podcast Santuario featuring the voices of Aura Garrido, Melina Matthews, Manolo Solo, Rocío León, Nikki García, and Dani Pérez Prada. The series was produced by Atresmedia TV alongside Pokeepsie Films. Montse García and Rodrigo Ruiz-Gallardón are credited as executive producers whilst Álex de la Iglesia and Carolina Bang are credited as producers. Shooting locations included Segovia.

== Release ==
The series debuted on Atresplayer on 22 December 2024.

== See also ==
- 2024 in Spanish television
