= Feroz Award for Best Main Actress in a Film =

Annual Spanish film award

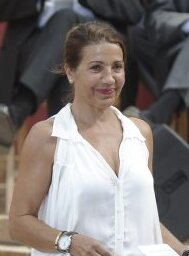
- The 2025 recipient: Emma Vilarasau
- Awarded for: Best Leading Performance by an Actress in a Spanish Film
- Country: Spain
- Presented by: Asociación de Informadores Cinematográficos de España
- Currently held by: Emma Vilarasau – A House on Fire (2025)

The Feroz Award for Best Main Actress in a Film (Spanish: Premio Feroz a la Mejor Actriz Protagonista de una Película) is one of the annual awards given at the Feroz Awards, presented by the Asociación de Informadores Cinematográficos de España.

It was first presented in 2014. Marian Álvarez was the first recipient of the award for her role as Ana in the drama Wounded.

== Winners and nominees ==
=== 2010s ===
Year	Recipient	Character	English title	Original title
2014	Marian Álvarez	Ana	Wounded	La herida
2014	Inma Cuesta	Ruth	Three Many Weddings	3 bodas de más
2014	Aura Garrido	Ella	Stockholm	
2014	Nora Navas	Geni	We All Want What's Best for Her	Tots volem el millor per a ella
2014	Candela Peña	C.	Yesterday Never Ends	Ayer no termina nunca
2014	Belén Rueda	Nora	Ismael	
2015	Bárbara Lennie	Bárbara	Magical Girl	
2015	Natalia Tena	Alex	10,000 km	10.000 km
2015	Ingrid García Jonsson	Natalia	Beautiful Youth	Belleza juventud
2015	Carmina Barrios	Carmina	Carmina and Amen	Carmina y amén
2015	Elena Anaya	Lupe	They Are All Dead	Todos están muertos
2016	Inma Cuesta	The Bride	The Bride	La novia
2016	Penélope Cruz	Magda	Ma Ma	
2016	Irene Escolar	June	An Autumn Without Berlin	Un otoño sin Berlín
2016	Natalia de Molina	Rocío	Food and Shelter	Techo y comida
2016	Nora Navas	Natalia	La adopción	
2017	Bárbara Lennie	María	María (and Everybody Else)	María (y los demás)
2017	Anna Castillo	Alma	The Olive Tree	El olivo
2017	Carmen Machi	Rosa	The Open Door	La puerta abierta
2017	Emma Suárez	Julieta Arcos	Julieta	
2017	Adriana Ugarte	younger Julieta Arcos	Julieta	
2018	Nathalie Poza	Carla	Can't Say Goodbye	No sé decir adiós
2018	Marián Álvarez	Marta	Dying	Morir
2018	Laia Artigas	Frida	Summer 1993	Estiu 1993
2018	Sandra Escacena	Verónica	Veronica	Verónica
2018	Núria Prims	Carlana	Uncertain Glory	Incerta glòria
2018	Maribel Verdú	Carmen	Abracadabra	
2019	Eva Llorach	Violeta	Quién te cantará	
2019	Penélope Cruz	Laura	Everybody Knows	Todos lo saben
2019	Lola Dueñas	Estrella	Journey to a Mother's Room	Viaje al cuarto de una madre
2019	Alexandra Jiménez	Olivia	Distances	Les distàncies
2019	Bárbara Lennie	Petra	Petra	

=== 2020s ===
Year	Recipient	Character	English title	Original title
2020	Belén Cuesta	Rosa	The Endless Trench	La trinchera infinita
2020	Pilar Castro	Helga Pato	Advantages of Travelling by Train	Ventajas de viajar en tren
2020	Greta Fernández	Sara	A Thief's Daughter	La hija de un ladrón
2020	Marta Nieto	Elena	Mother	Madre
2020	María Rodríguez Soto	Vir	The Days to Come	Els dies que vindran
2021	Patricia López Arnáiz	Lide	Ane Is Missing	Ane
2021	Amaia Aberasturi	Ana	Coven	Akelarre
2021	Andrea Fandos	Celia	Schoolgirls	Las niñas
2021	Kiti Mánver	Lola	One Careful Owner	El inconveniente
2021	Candela Peña	Rosa	Rosa's Wedding	La boda de Rosa
2022	Petra Martínez	María	That Was Life	La vida era eso
2022	Tamara Casellas	Pepa	Ama	
2022	Penélope Cruz	Janis Martínez Moreno	Parallel Mothers	Madres paralelas
2022	Marta Nieto	C.	Out of Sync	Tres
2022	Blanca Portillo	Maixabel Lasa	Maixabel	
2023	Laia Costa	Amaia	Lullaby	Cinco lobitos
2023	Anna Castillo	Julia	Wild Flowers	Girasoles silvestres
2023	Laura Galán	Sara	Piggy	Cerdita
2023	Marina Foïs	Olga	The Beasts	As bestas
2023	Carla Quílez	Carla	Motherhood	La maternal
2024	Malena Alterio	Lucía	Something Is About to Happen	Que nadie duerma
2024	Laia Costa	Nat	Un amor	
2024	Kiti Mánver	Mamacruz	Mamacruz	
2024	María Vázquez	Ramona	Matria	
2024	Carolina Yuste	Conchita	Jokes & Cigarettes	Saben aquell
2025	Emma Vilarasau	Montse	A House on Fire	Casa en flames
2025	Patricia López Arnaiz	Isabel	Glimmers	Los destellos
2025	Najwa Nimri	Aurora	The Red Virgin	La virgen roja
2025	Laura Weissmahr	Maria Agirre	Salve Maria	
2025	Carolina Yuste	Mónica / Arantxa	Undercover	La infiltrada
2026	Ángela Cervantes	Alexandra	Fury	La furia
2026	Miriam Garlo	Ángela	Deaf	Sorda
2026	Patricia López Arnaiz	Maite	Sundays	Los domingos
2026	Nora Navas	Eva	My Friend Eva	Mi amiga Eva
2026	Blanca Soroa	Ainara	Sundays	Los domingos

==== Actresses with multiple nominations and awards ====
Actresses with multiple nominations
Nominations	Actress
3	Bárbara Lennie
3	Patricia López Arnaiz
3	Penélope Cruz
3	Nora Navas
2	Inma Cuesta
2	Marian Álvarez
2	Anna Castillo
2	Carolina Yuste
2	Laia Costa
2	Marta Nieto
2	Candela Peña

Actresses with multiple awards
Wins	Actress
2	Bárbara Lennie

== See also ==
- Goya Award for Best Actress
- Goya Award for Best New Actress
