= Marcel Barrena =

Spanish actor and director

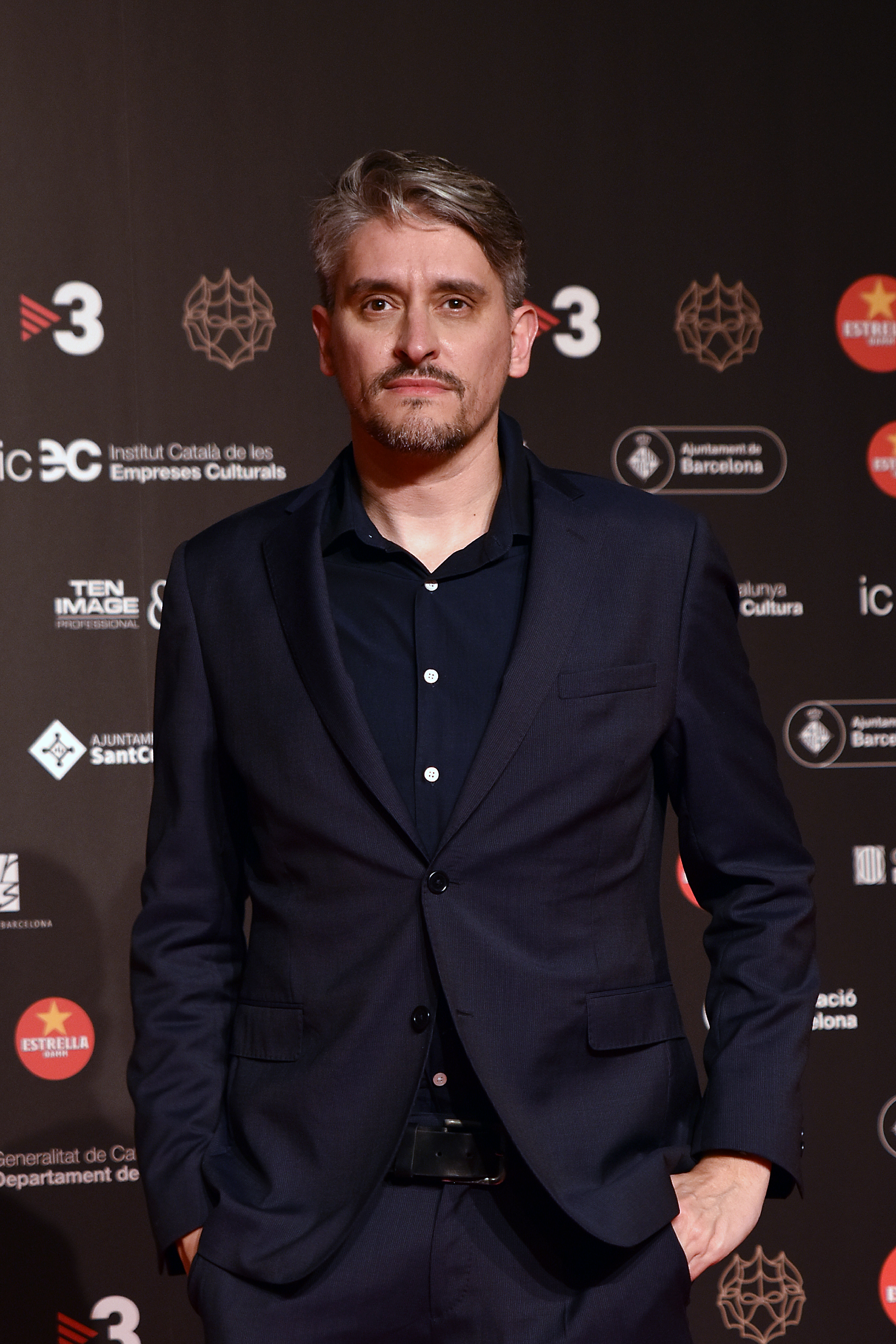
Marcel Barrena in 2022

Marcel Barrena (born 15 October 1981) is a Spanish film director, screenwriter, producer and editor. He has directed films such as 100 Meters, Mediterraneo: The Law of the Sea, and The 47.

== Filmography ==
In 2011 he won the Catalan Academy Award for his movie debut, Cuatro estaciones, a low budget romantic comedy that was highly appreciated by the public, both in its TV screenings as well as on the Internet. Marcel Barrena is the first director that won Gaudí Award for two different films (for "Cuatro Estaciones" and "Little World" as well). His three theatrical movies has been nominated for the Goya Awards and become hits in the Spanish industry.

Cuatro Estaciones was the first TV movie to represent Spain at CinemaSpagna Festival in Rome. It also won the Best Movie, Director and FIPRESCI awards at the Festival de Alicante and best TV-Movie at the Catalan Gaudi Festival. Barrena's second film is the acclaimed documentary Món Petit (Little World). The film has been awarded with the DOC U Award at IDFA and became the first Spanish movie to get to the 3rd place at the IDFA Audience Award, out of 300 documentaries. Neil Young, from The Hollywood Reporter, defined Little World as “one of my top 10 films of the year.”

"100 metros" is his first fiction movie for cinemas. Starring the Spanish juggernauts Dani Rovira and Karra Elejalde (and Alexandra Jimenez, Maria de Medeiros, David Verdaguer...) the film is one of the most viewed and acclaimed movies in Spanish cinema in 2016, and a frontliner in terms of profits. Netflix acquired the international rights for "100 metros" in Cannes Film Festival Market being one of the most important bids of the company in Spanish cinema. The movie opened in the Spanish box office in the 5th place (a B.O. final of 2 million €), a total success for a movie participated for public Spanish broadcast (the second place of the year just after Almodovar's "Julieta") and not distributed for a major, and it was an important success in cinemas in Portugal, Greece and other international territories and all over the world on Netflix.

He directed the 2021 drama film Mediterraneo: The Law of the Sea, one of the most important Spanish films of the year. Premiered at San Sebastian International Film Festival, the movie was one of the three Spanish entries for the Oscars, competing against Fernando Leon de Aranoa starred by Javier Bardem "The Good Boss" and Almodovar's "Parallel Mothers". "Mediterráneo", nominated for Best Movie in the Goya and Gaudí Awards, won 3 Goya Awards, 4 Gaudis, a Platino award and was selected Best Film in Rome International Film Festival. Also, was the front runner in Audience Award in Miami Film Festival, and won several international film festivals such as Boulder, Ourense... and was one of the top films in all the Spanish awards, such as the producers guild Forque Awards, the Feroz awards (the press awards) and the Medallas CECC, where whas selected for the most important film of the year in terms of Educational Values. The movie has become something beyond than a movie and was recommended by The Pope himself in a press conference and first Spanish and Catalan political and social figures. Starred by some of the greatest Spanish actors of his generation (Eduard Fernández, Dani Rovira, Anna Castillo and Sergi López), "Mediterráneo" has turned Marcel Barrena into one of the most important Spanish directors of his generation.

.

== Awards and film festivals ==
- Mediterraneo: The Law of the Sea (2021)
  - Goya nomination for the Best Picture of the Year.
  - 3 Goya Awards, including Best Cinematography, Best Song and Best Production Design.
  - 4 Gaudí Awards: Audience Award, Best Music, Best Production Design, Best Visual Effects.
  - Platino Award for the Best Cinematography.
  - Medalla CECC for its Educational Values.
  - Boulder Film Festival: Best Picture.
  - Rome International Film Festival: Best Picture.
  - Premios Forqué (Spanish Producers Guild): Nominated for Best Picture, Best Actor and Educational Values.
  - Preselected for representing Spain at the Oscars.

More than 20 international movie awards.

- 100 Meters (2016)
  - Gaudí Award for Best Supporting Actress (Alexandra Jiménez)
  - Gaudí Award for Best Supporting Actor (Karra Elejalde)
  - 11 Gaudi Awards Nominations, including Best Picture.
  - Goya Awards Nomination for Best Supporting Actor.
  - Forque Award Nomination for Values in Cinema.
  - National Society of Neurology Special Award.
- Little World (2012)
  - Gaudí Award, for the best documentary of the year.
  - Goya Nomination, for the best documentary of the year.
  - Best Documentary: Boulder Film Festival (USA)
  - IDFA 2012: DocU Award; 3rd Audience Award.
  - Norwegian Doc Film Festival: Audience Award.
  - Palm Springs International Film Festival (out of competition).
  - Bradford Film Festival.
  - ZagrebDox (Croatia): Young Jury Award.
  - Fic-Cat, Official Selection.
  - Shanghai International Film Festival- Panorama.
  - Gdansk DokFilm Festival: official Selection.
- Cuatro estaciones (2010)
  - Catalan Academy: Best TVMovie of the Year: GAUDÍ.
  - Festival de Alicante: Best Director; Best Film and FIPRESCI Award.
