= What the Future Holds (TV series) =

Spanish television series

- Promotional poster
- Spanish: El día de mañana
- Genre: Period drama
- Created by: Mariano Barroso
- Based on: El día de mañana by Ignacio Martínez de Pisón
- Written by: Mariano Barroso; Alejandro Hernández
- Directed by: Mariano Barroso
- Starring: Oriol Pla; Aura Garrido; Jesús Carroza; Karra Elejalde
- Country of origin: Spain
- Original language: Spanish
- No. of seasons: 1
- No. of episodes: 6

Production
- Executive producer: Movistar+
- Running time: 50 minutes (approx.)
- Production company: Mod Producciones

Original release
- Release: 22 June 2018

What the Future Holds (Spanish: El día de mañana) is a Spanish period drama miniseries created by Mariano Barroso for Movistar+. The series is based on Ignacio Martínez de Pisón's novel of the same name and premiered on 22 June 2018. The screenplay was co-penned by Barroso and Alejandro Hernández.

== Premise ==
Justo Gil, a young man, arrives at the city of Barcelona during the 1960s as a migrant worker, break even and with the aim of becoming a man of success. The city, which is turning into modernity, seems like the place to make it big: an oasis of freedom in the middle of Francoism from 1966 to 1977.

== Cast ==
=== Main ===
- Oriol Pla as Justo Gil
- Aura Garrido as Carme Román
- Jesús Carroza as Inspector Mateo Moreno
- Karra Elejalde as Comisario Landa

=== Recurring ===
- David Selvas
- Pere Ponce
- Nora Navas
- David Marcé
- Dafnis Balduz
- Pol López
- Max Megías
- Diana Gómez
- Javier Beltrán

== Episodes ==
No.	Title	Directed by
1	"Episodio 1"	Mariano Barroso
2	"Episodio 2"	Mariano Barroso
3	"Episodio 3"	Mariano Barroso
4	"Episodio 4"	Mariano Barroso
5	"Episodio 5"	Mariano Barroso
6	"Episodio 6"	Mariano Barroso
