= The Fear (2013 film) =

- Catalan: La por
- Directed by: Jordi Cadena
- Screenplay by: Jordi Cadena; Núria Villazán
- Based on: M by Lolita Bosch
- Produced by: Antonio Chavarrías
- Starring: Igor Szpakowski; Roser Camí; Ramon Madaula; Alícia Falcó
- Cinematography: Sergi Gallardo
- Edited by: David Gallart
- Production company: Oberon Cinematográfica
- Distributed by: Splendor Films
- Release dates: October 2013 (BFI London); 22 November 2013 (Spain)
- Running time: 73 minutes
- Country: Spain
- Language: Catalan

The Fear (Catalan: La por) is a 2013 Spanish psychological drama film directed by Jordi Cadena from a screenplay co-written by Núria Villazán based on the novel M by Lolita Bosch. It stars Igor Szpakowski alongside Roser Camí, Ramon Madaula, and Alícia Falcó.

== Plot ==
The plot follows the plight of Manel, a teenager scared of becoming someone like his father, who beats Manel's mother, sister and Manel himself.

== Cast ==
- Igor Szpakowski as Manel
- Roser Camí as the mother
- Ramon Madaula as the father
- Alícia Falcó as Coral
- Guille Lloberas as Xavi
- Nina Pomodoro as Laura

== Production ==
Based on the novel M by Lolita Bosch, The Fear is an Oberon Cinematográfica production and it had the collaboration of ICEC, TVC, and Creative Europe MEDIA.

== Release ==
For its world premiere, the film made it to the lineup of the 57th BFI London Film Festival. Likewise, the film was also presented at the 58th Valladolid International Film Festival (Seminci) on 21 October 2013. Distributed by Splendor Films, it was released theatrically in Spain on 22 November 2013.

== Reception ==
Jonathan Holland of The Hollywood Reporter described the film as "a viewing experience which, though undeniably harrowing, never fully engages with the profound, dark issues it raises".

Mirito Torreiro of Fotogramas rated the film 4 out of 5 stars, declaring it an "extraordinary instance of narrative maturity", with its "measured, impeccable" dramatic crescendo and a closing with no concessions.

Sergi Sánchez of La Razón wrote that "With the exception of an unfortunate flash-forward unnecessarily giving away the ending, the director "steers the story with a steady hand toward its devastating conclusion".

Jordi Costa of El País deemed the film to be an "outstanding, piercing" miniature.

== Accolades ==
Year	Award	Category	Nominee(s)	Result	Ref.
2014	6th Gaudí Awards	Best Director	Jordi Cadena	Nominated	
2014	6th Gaudí Awards	Best Screenplay	Jordi Cadena, Núria Villazán	Nominated	
2014	6th Gaudí Awards	Best Supporting Actor	Ramon Madaula	Won	
2014	6th Gaudí Awards	Best Cinematography	Sergi Gallardo	Nominated	
2014	6th Gaudí Awards	Best Editing	David Gallart	Nominated	

== See also ==
- List of Spanish films of 2013
