= La Estrella (film) =

- Theatrical release poster
- Directed by: Alberto Aranda
- Written by: Alberto Aranda; Belén Carmona
- Based on: La Estrella by Belén Carmona
- Starring: Ingrid Rubio; Carmen Machi; Marc Clotet; Fele Martínez; Carlos Blanco
- Cinematography: Bet Rourich
- Edited by: Elena Ruiz; Bruno Palazón-Arnaud
- Music by: Zacarías M. de la Riva
- Production company: A Contraluz Films
- Distributed by: Splendor Films
- Release dates: 22 April 2013 (Málaga); 24 May 2013 (Spain)
- Country: Spain
- Language: Spanish

La Estrella is a 2013 Spanish comedy-tinged drama film directed by Alberto Aranda (in his feature debut) based on the novel by Belén Carmona. It stars Ingrid Rubio as the title character alongside Carmen Machi, Marc Clotet, and Fele Martínez.

== Plot ==
Set in Santa Coloma de Gramenet and featuring the backdrop of gender violence, the plot follows the vicissitudes of Estrella, a good-willed and joyful woman (with her boyfriend Salva and her best friend Trini around). She takes the reins of her life in a search for happiness.

== Cast ==
- Ingrid Rubio as Estrella
- Carmen Machi as Trini
- Marc Clotet as Salva
- Fele Martínez as Baltasar
- Carlos Blanco as Jonás
- Rubén Sánchez as Marc
- Pep Tosar as Xavier
- Alfonsa Rosso as Antonia
- Fanny de Castro as Manolita
- Pepe Rodríguez as Manuel
- Wong Sau-Ching as Li

== Production ==
Written by Alberto Aranda and Belén Carmona, the film is based on the novel of the same name by Belén Carmona. It is a A Contraluz Films production, and it had the participation of TVC and TVE, and support from ICEC and ICAA. It was primarily shot in Santa Coloma de Gramenet (specifically in Les Oliveres neighborhood).

== Release ==
The film was presented in the 'Malaga Premiere' section of the 16th Málaga Film Festival in April 2013. Distributed by Splendor Films, the film was theatrically released in Spain on 24 May 2013.

== Reception ==
Mariló García of Cinemanía rated the film 2 out of 5 stars, deeming it to be "tedious in its execution and presumable in its development", concluding that "not even Ingrid Rubio's luminous smile manages to captivate us".

Javier Ocaña of El País noted the discrete yields reaped by the film, in which authenticity only appears in dribs and drabs.

Toni Vall of Ara rated the film 2 out of 5 stars, praising the "tireless struggle [by Aranda] to project light and filmic truth" to a story that has however "been explained to us a thousand and one times before".

== Accolades ==
Year	Award	Category	Nominee(s)	Result	Ref.
2014	6th Gaudí Awards	Best Actress	Ingrid Rubio	Nominated	
2014	6th Gaudí Awards	Best Supporting Actress	Carmen Machi	Nominated	
2014	23rd Actors and Actresses Union Awards	Best Film Actress in a Leading Role	Ingrid Rubio	Nominated	

== See also ==
- List of Spanish films of 2013
