= Mar Coll =

Spanish filmmaker (born 1981)

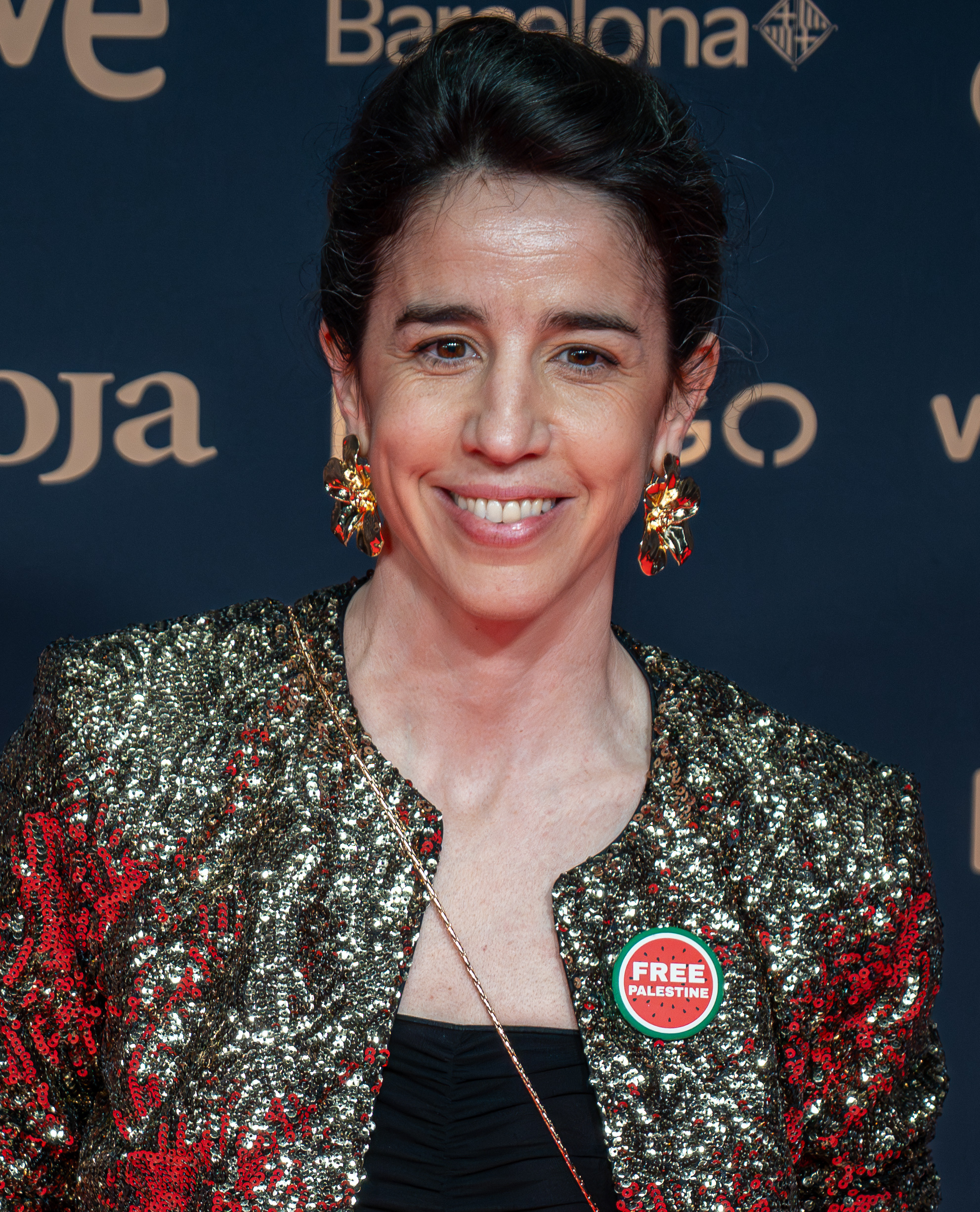
- Coll in 2026
- Born: 1981 (age 44–45); Barcelona, Spain
- Occupations: Film director, screenwriter

Mar Coll (born 1981) is a Spanish film director best known for the films Three Days With the Family and We All Want What's Best for Her.

== Early life and education ==
Coll was born in Barcelona. She studied filmmaking at the Cinema and Audiovisual School of Catalonia.

== Career ==
Coll's first feature, the 2009 ensemble drama Three Days With the Family, premiered at the Málaga Film Festival, where it was nominated for Best Director, Best Actress, and Best Actor. The following year, Coll won the Goya Award for Best New Director and the Gaudí Award for Best Director for the film.

In 2013, Coll's film We All Want What's Best for Her, starring Nora Navas as an unsatisfied housewife, debuted at the Valladolid International Film Festival.

Coll directed the 2018 limited series Matar al padre, followed by the series This Is Not Sweden in 2023.

Salve Maria, Coll's 2024 adaptation of the Katixa Agirre novel Mothers Don't, premiered at the 77th Locarno Film Festival.

== Filmography ==
=== Film ===
Key
†	Denotes films that have not yet been released

Year	Title	Notes	Ref.
2004	La última polaroid	Short film	
2009	Three Days With the Family	—N/a	
2013	We All Want What's Best for Her	—N/a	
2015	La inquilina	Short film	
2024	Salve Maria	—N/a	

=== Television ===
Year	Title	Ref.
2018	Killing the Father	
2023	Això no és Suècia	

== Awards and nominations ==
Year	Award	Category	Nominated work	Result	Ref.
2009	Málaga Film Festival	Best Director	Three Days With the Family	Nominated	
2010	Goya Awards	Best New Director	Three Days With the Family	Won	
2010	Gaudí Awards	Best Director	Three Days With the Family	Won	
2010	Gaudí Awards	Best Film in a Catalan Language	Three Days With the Family	Won	
2014	Gaudí Awards	Best Director	We All Want What's Best for Her	Nominated	
2014	Gaudí Awards	Best Screenplay	We All Want What's Best for Her	Nominated	
2024	Locarno Film Festival	Golden Leopard	Salve Maria	Nominated	
2024	Locarno Film Festival	Best Performance	Salve Maria	Special Mention	
