= Laura Fernández Espeso =

Spanish film and television producer and media executive (born 1972

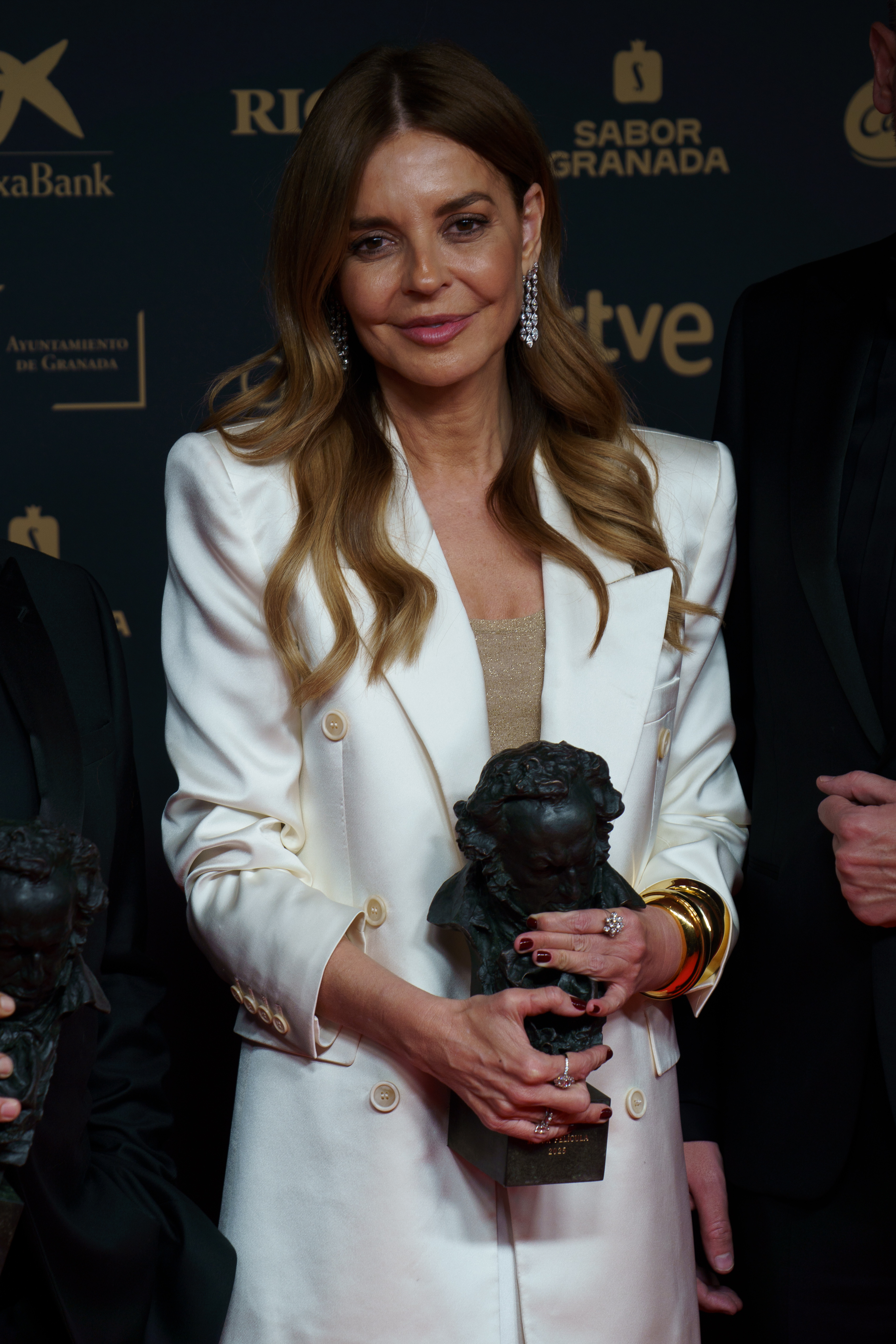
- Fernández Espeso in 2025
- Born: 1972 (age 53–54)
- Occupations: Media executive, film and television producer
- Known for: CEO and Director General of Mediapro Studio

Laura Fernández Espeso (born 1972) is a Spanish media executive. She served as the CEO of Mediapro Studio from 2020 to 2025. She has also worked as a film and television producer.

== Early life and education ==
Fernández Espeso was born in Benavente in 1972. She earned a marketing degree from London South Bank University.

== Career ==
She joined Globomedia in 2009 as one of the few Spanish executives with international TV work experience. After Mediapro purchased Globomedia in 2015, she was named Director of International Content, driving the company's expansion abroad.

In 2019, Fernández Espeso was appointed as corporate and TV director of The Mediapro Studio, Mediapro's production arm, and subsequently became its CEO the following year.

During her time overseeing the group's production, Mediapro created TV shows and films such as HBO Max's thriller series The Head and The 47.

In January 2025, she became Director General of Mediapro, and served in that position until departing from Mediapro altogether in December 2025. Also in 2025, she won the Goya Award for Best Film for The 47 at the 39th Goya Awards.
