= Matar al padre =

Spanish television series

- Genre: Family drama; Tragicomedy
- Screenplay by: Mar Coll; Valentina Viso; Diego Vega
- Directed by: Mar Coll
- Starring: Gonzalo de Castro; Paulina García; Marcel Borràs; Greta Fernández; Pol López; Nuria González
- Country of origin: Spain
- Original languages: Spanish; Catalan
- No. of seasons: 1
- No. of episodes: 4

Production
- Running time: 50 minutes
- Production company: Movistar+

Original release
- Release: 25 May 2018

Matar al padre (transl. 'To Kill the Father') is a four-part Spanish family drama television miniseries with comedy elements directed by Mar Coll. It stars Gonzalo de Castro, Paulina García, Marcel Borràs, Greta Fernández, Pol López, and Nuria González. It was released by Movistar+ in May 2018.

== Premises ==
The fiction spans along 16 years, with each episode respectively set in 1996, 2004, 2008 and 2012. Starting in 1996 post-Olympic Barcelona, the plot focuses on Jacobo Vidal—an authoritarian, obsessive and dysfunctional pater familias—and his developing relationship with his children, Tomás and Valeria. While the depicted family members in the series are largely Spanish-speaking, they sometimes interact with other characters in Catalan too.

== Cast ==
- Gonzalo de Castro as Jacobo Vidal.
- Paulina García as Isabel.
- Marcel Borràs as Tomás.
- Greta Fernández as Valeria.
- Pol López as Iván.
- Nuria González as Mireia.

== Production and release ==
Directed by Mar Coll, she wrote the screenplay together with Valentina Viso and Diego Vega. Entirely shot in Catalonia, production crew worked in the surroundings of Barcelona, namely in Font Vella de Can Catà. Matar al padre was pre-screened on 18 April 2018 at the 21st Málaga Spanish Film Festival. Consisting of 4 episodes with a running time of around 50 minutes, the miniseries was fully released by Movistar+ on 25 May 2018.

Series	Episodes	Originally released	Network	Ref.
1	4	25 May 2018	Movistar+	

No.	Title	Directed by	Original release date
1	"1996"	Mar Coll	25 May 2018
2	"2004"	Mar Coll	25 May 2018
3	"2008"	Mar Coll	25 May 2018
4	"2012"	Mar Coll	25 May 2018
