= The Last Days (2013 film) =

- Spanish theatrical release poster
- Spanish: Los últimos días
- Directed by: David Pastor; Àlex Pastor
- Written by: David Pastor; Àlex Pastor
- Produced by: Alberto Marini; Mercedes Gamero; Pedro Uriol
- Starring: Quim Gutiérrez; José Coronado; Marta Etura
- Cinematography: Daniel Aranyó
- Edited by: Martí Roca
- Music by: Fernando Velázquez
- Production companies: Morena Films; Antena 3 Films; Rebelion Terrestre
- Distributed by: Warner Bros. Spain
- Release dates: March 20, 2013 (Barcelona premiere); March 27, 2013 (Spain)
- Running time: 100 minutes
- Country: Spain
- Languages: Spanish; Catalan
- Budget: €5.5 million

The Last Days (Spanish: Los últimos días) is a 2013 Spanish science fiction thriller film written and directed by David and Àlex Pastor. The film had its world premiere on March 20, 2013, in Barcelona, and stars Quim Gutiérrez as a man who must deal with the potential end of all humanity.

== Plot ==
Office worker Marc scavenges for food in a downtown Barcelona building that has been ravaged by a catastrophic event. Directed to the basement to help dig a tunnel, he almost causes its collapse as he panics over the fate of his girlfriend Julia, who was staying at his apartment at the time of the catastrophe. When they break through to a neighboring building, he meets his former boss Enrique, who tells Marc that they can talk later. A flashback reveals that Marc, working as a computer engineer, faced possible termination by Enrique. Afraid of losing his job, Marc resists Julia's desire to have children. The following morning, Marc watches a video of a boy who dies from suicide because his father could not understand or believe in his acute agoraphobia.

In the present, three months after the unspecified event, Marc and Enrique discuss leaving the building together. Enrique, who has a working GPS device, requests that Marc not tell the others about it; Marc reveals that he has stolen supplies formerly owned by Rovira, a dead coworker. Enrique is initially dismissive of Marc's scavenged supplies and declines to partner with him, but Marc blackmails Enrique into helping him search for Julia. The two set out into the subway system, where a young pickpocket steals the GPS device. After a chase and fight over his possessions, Enrique kills Javier, the pickpocket's brother after the power goes out. Although worried that Enrique will continue without him, Marc is relieved to find that Enrique is willing to continue their partnership.

Another flashback shows that Marc's neighbor has not left the building for months. At work, Rovira, revealed to have been covertly living in the office, is forced to leave. Once thrown out, he convulses; when dragged back in, the convulsions end, but he still dies from the trauma. Discussing these strange events at home with Julia, Marc notices that increasing numbers of people are refusing to leave their homes. In the present, Marc grows frustrated with Enrique's refusal to reveal why he wants to go to the Olympic city with a bag full of seeds. When they believe they have reached Marc's apartment building, they blast their way in with explosives. There, they learn that Julia, now pregnant, is not in the building.

Flashbacks depict a growing trend of agoraphobia called "the Panic", a disease of unknown origin that kills anyone who goes outside through convulsion. Julia and Marc fight again over whether to have children, and Julia accuses Marc of using the Panic as an excuse to avoid it. After Marc leaves for work, Julia refuses to speak to him, and he becomes stranded in the office building when he suddenly becomes agoraphobic. In the present, Enrique tells Marc that since they have reached his apartment building, he will no longer accompany Marc. Enrique reveals that he is attempting to reach the hospital where his comatose father is at, which prompts the two to reconcile somewhat. At a church, a bear nearly mauls Enrique to death, but Marc manages to kill it. While the two eat the bear, they bond over their pasts and fears.

A group of survivors inform Enrique that the hospital burnt down; since his father was in a coma, it is unlikely that he survived. Enrique falls into a deep depression and gives Marc his seeds, telling him to find Julia and save the baby. On his own, Marc ends up in a shopping center where Julia worked. He looks in the supermarket and finds a band of survivors, but they are raided by another group. He finds Julia's coworker, Andrea, but she is killed by debris. Marc is attacked by a man with a knife, but Enrique saves him but is severely wounded in the process, which he hides. Marc notices Julia in the opposite building. Overjoyed, he returns to tell Enrique and discovers his wounds. Urged by Enrique's dying wish, Marc crosses the street to be with Julia, though it nearly kills him.

Several months later, Julia gives birth, and they use the seeds to create a greenhouse. Over time, the child grows and is shown able to leave the building without suffering from the Panic. As this happens, he is part of a new generation of humanity that is naturally immune to the Panic. In the end, Marc and Julia watch him leave with several other youths to rebuild civilization.

== Cast ==
- Quim Gutiérrez as Marc
- José Coronado as Enrique
- Marta Etura as Julia
- Leticia Dolera as Andrea
- Mikel Iglesias as Dani
- Iván Massagué as Lucas
- Pere Ventura as Rovira
- Lluís Soler as Vecino
- Abdelatif Hwidar as Hombre Extranjero
- Farah Hamed as Mujer Extranjera
- Lily Morett as Niña Extranjera
- Isak Férriz as Javier
- Pere Brasó as Carlos
- Momo Ballesteros as Ángela
- Albert Prat as Toni

== Production ==
The Pastors announced their intent to film The Last Days in 2011 at the Sitges Film Festival, where they presented a four-minute teaser trailer. Filming took place in Barcelona on a budget of five million euros, which the Pastors stated would have had to have been larger if they shot the film in the United States. Actors Quim Gutiérrez and José Coronado were confirmed to be performing in the film, along with Marta Etura.

== Reception ==
As of March 2015, The Last Days received positive reviews with a 91% "Fresh" rating on Rotten Tomatoes, based on eleven reviews. Dread Central praised the film's characters and visuals, and Scott Weinberg writing for Fearnet, commented: "Taken a bit less seriously, or presented with a little less heart, The Last Days could easily devolve into something silly or (even worse) boring." Jonathan Holland, writing for Variety, expressed disappointment over the film, as they felt the directors "[failed] to deliver on the promise of their 2009 English-language debut, Carriers." Shelagh M. Rowan-Legg, writing for Twitch Film, gave the film a mixed review and wrote that, while the film had several strengths such as the story and special effects, it was ultimately "entertaining enough, but not likely to be remembered."

=== Box office ===
The film earned ¥11.46 million at the Chinese box office.

=== Awards ===
Awards
| Association | Award Category | Recipient (if any) | Status |
| 6th Gaudí Awards | Best Cinematography | Daniel Aranyó | Won |
| 6th Gaudí Awards | Best Sound | Licio Marcos de Oliveira, Oriol Tarragó, David Calleja | Won |
| 6th Gaudí Awards | Best Make-Up and Hairstyles | Patricia Reyes | Won |
| 6th Gaudí Awards | Best Art Direction | Balter Gallart | Won |
| 6th Gaudí Awards | Best Production Manager | Josep Amorós | Won |
| 6th Gaudí Awards | Best Film not in the Catalan Language | Multiple recipients | Won |
| 6th Gaudí Awards | Best Special/Visual Effects | Multiple recipients | Won |
| 6th Gaudí Awards | Best Original Score | Fernando Velázquez | Nominated |
| 6th Gaudí Awards | Best Director | Àlex and David Pastor | Nominated |
| 6th Gaudí Awards | Best Costume Design | Olga Rodal | Nominated |
| 6th Gaudí Awards | Best Screenplay | Àlex and David Pastor | Nominated |
| 28th Goya Awards | Best Production Manager | Josep Amorós | Nominated |
| 28th Goya Awards | Best Special Effects | Lluís Rivera, Juan Manuel Nogales | Nominated |

== See also ==
- List of Spanish films of 2013
- The Exterminating Angel
