= We All Want What's Best for Her =

- Theatrical release poster
- Catalan: Tots volem el millor per a ella
- Directed by: Mar Coll
- Screenplay by: Mar Coll; Valentina Viso
- Starring: Nora Navas; Valeria Bertuccelli; Pau Durà; Àgata Roca; Jordi Costa; Clara Segura
- Cinematography: Neus Ollé
- Edited by: Aina Calleja
- Music by: Maikmaier
- Production companies: Escándalo Films; Televisió de Catalunya
- Release dates: 19 October 2013 (Seminci); 25 October 2013 (Spain)
- Country: Spain
- Languages: Catalan; Spanish

We All Want What's Best for Her (Catalan: Tots volem el millor per a ella) is a 2013 Spanish drama film directed and co-written by Mar Coll which stars Nora Navas along with Valeria Bertuccelli. It features dialogue in both Catalan and Spanish.

== Plot ==
Taking place in a "more or less recognizable" gray version of Barcelona, (Note: According to Coll: "it happens in Barcelona, but it's not super recognizable either... we've created quite a gray atmosphere".) the plot follows Geni, a brilliant lawyer and a member of the Catalan bourgeoisie who, in the wake of a car crash, learns that she is no longer interested in her life before the accident.

== Cast ==
- Nora Navas as Geni
- Valeria Bertuccelli as Mariana
- Pau Durà as Dani
- Àgata Roca as Raquel
- Jordi Costa as Enric
- Clara Segura as Glòria

== Production ==
The film was produced by Escándalo Films and Televisió de Catalunya, and it had support from TVE and ICEC. It was shot with dialogue in Catalan and Spanish.

== Release ==
The film opened the 58th Valladolid International Film Festival (Seminci) on 19 October 2013. It was theatrically released in Spain on 25 October 2013.

== Reception ==
Jonathan Holland of The Hollywood Reporter assessed that "the central character" (played by Navas in a performance "which can be described as otherworldly") is "more interesting than the film about her in this beautifully-played study of a woman in emotional limbo".

Mirito Torreiro of Fotogramas rated the film 3 out of 5 stars, highlighting the acting duel between Navas and Bertuccelli as the best thing about the film, while noting that it goes sometimes over and over the same things as a negative point.

== Accolades ==
Year	Award	Category	Nominee(s)	Result	Ref.
2013	58th Valladolid International Film Festival	Best Actress	Nora Navas	Won	
2014	1st Feroz Awards	Best Drama Film		Nominated	
2014	1st Feroz Awards	Best Main Actress	Nora Navas	Nominated	
2014	6th Gaudí Awards	Best Film		Nominated	
2014	6th Gaudí Awards	Best Director	Mar Coll	Nominated	
2014	6th Gaudí Awards	Best Screenplay	Mar Coll, Valentina Viso	Nominated	
2014	6th Gaudí Awards	Best Actress	Nora Navas	Won	
2014	6th Gaudí Awards	Best Supporting Actress	Àgata Roca	Nominated	
2014	6th Gaudí Awards	Best Supporting Actress	Clara Segura	Won	
2014	6th Gaudí Awards	Best Supporting Actor	Pau Durà	Nominated	
2014	6th Gaudí Awards	Best Makeup and Hairstyles	Laura Bruy, Txus González	Nominated	
2014	28th Goya Awards	Best Actress	Nora Navas	Nominated	

== See also ==
- List of Spanish films of 2013
