= Dieciocho (TV series) =

- Promotional release poster
- Written by: Pau Escribano; Damià Serra Cauchetiez
- Directed by: Hammudi Al-Rahmoun Font; Damià Serra Cauchetiez
- Starring: Alícia Falcó; Maël Rouin-Berrandou
- Country of origin: Spain
- Original languages: Catalan; Spanish; Arabic
- No. of episodes: 6

Production
- Running time: 30 min
- Production companies: RTVE; Little Dreams Films AIE

Original release
- Network: RTVE Play
- Release: 23 October 2024

Dieciocho is a Spanish teen drama television series directed by Hammudi Al-Rahmoun Font and Damià Serra Cauchetiez and written by Pau Escribano and Pau Escribano and Damià Serra Cauchetiez.

== Plot ==
Set in the Valencian Community and the Canary Islands, the plot explores the love relationship between Moha (a Moroccan under guardianship) and Cèlia (sentenced to community service) upon meeting in a kitchen.

== Cast ==
- Maël Rouin-Berrandou as Moha
- Alícia Falcó as Cèlia
- María Poquet as Ester
- Ann Perelló as Sandra
- Pep Tosar as comisario Ibáñez
- Roberto Hoyo as Matías
- Abdelatif Hwidar
- Tarik Rmili

== Production ==
The series was produced by Little Dreams Films AIE, Set Màgic Audiovisual, The Fly Hunter and Empatic Films for RTVE Play with the participation of À Punt Mèdia and IB3, funding from Crea SGR, backing from IVC and the collaboration of Canary Islands Film – Gobierno de Canarias.

== Release ==
Consisting of six episodes featuring an average runtime of 30 minutes, Dieciocho debuted on RTVE Play on 23 October 2024.

== See also ==
- 2024 in Spanish television
