= Clara Segura =

Catalan actress and theatre director

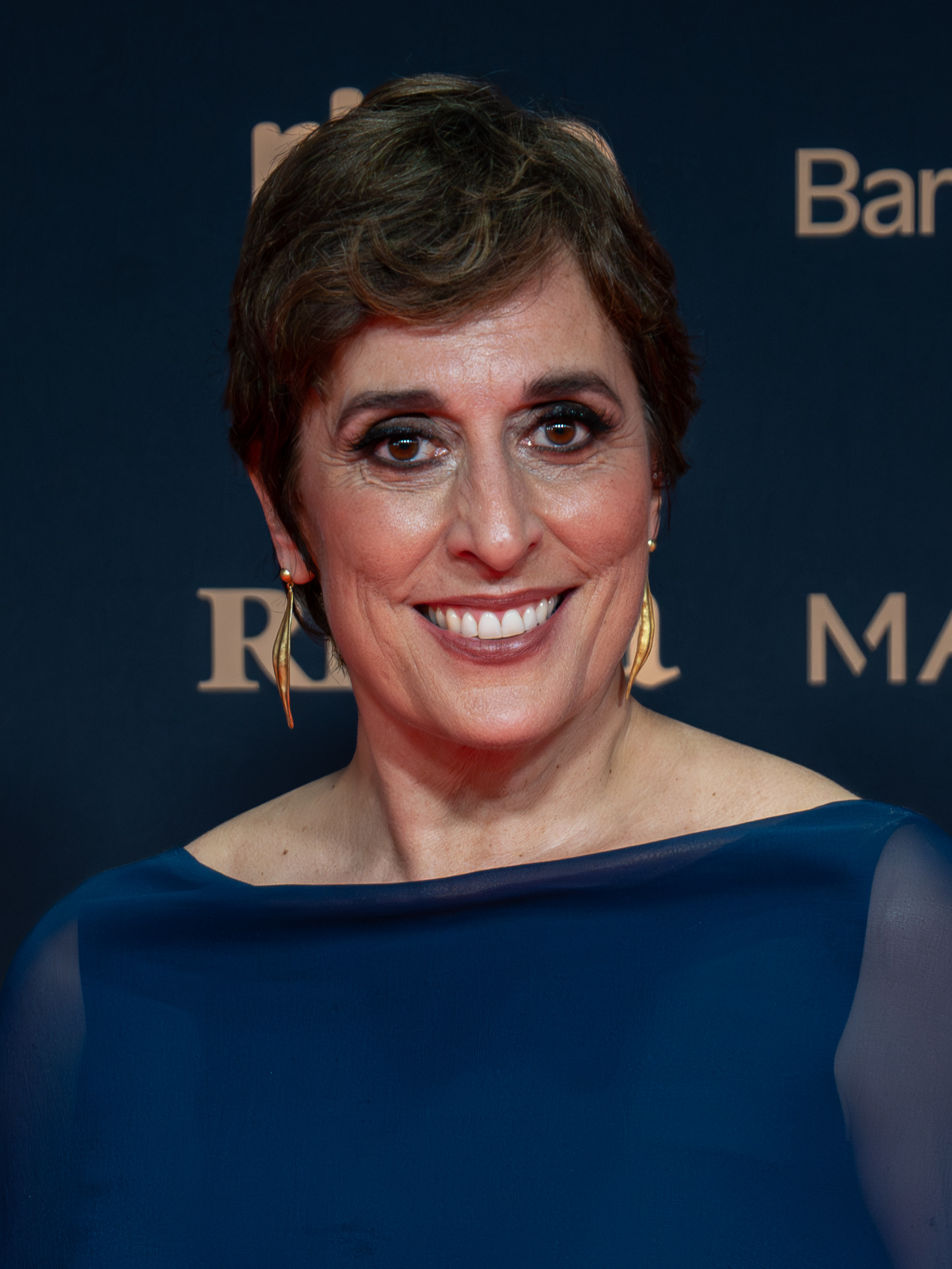
- Segura in 2026
- Born: Clara Segura Crespo; 6 May 1974 (age 52); Sant Just Desvern, Spain
- Education: Institut del Teatre
- Occupations: Actress; theatre director

Clara Segura Crespo (born 6 May 1974) is a Catalan actress and theatre director. She is a prolific performer in the Catalan stage scene.

== Life and career ==
Clara Segura Crespo was born in Sant Just Desvern on 6 May 1974. Despite entering a degree on art history, she graduated instead from Barcelona's Institut del Teatre in 1996. She also took studies on solfeggio, singing and piano. She made her debut onstage in La bona gent, which was followed by appearances in Antígona, L'espera, Ets aquí?, Madame Melville and El somni d'una nit d'estiu. She made her feature film debut as an actress in Joel Joan's Excuses! (2003), portraying Begoña, the hysterical wife of Jesús (Jordi Sánchez). It was followed by an appearance in The Sea Inside (2004), portraying Gené, an acquaintance of Ramón Sampedro and pro-euthanasia activist who introduces lawyer Julia to the former. She won a Gaudí Award for Best Supporting Actress for Les dues vides d'Andrés Rabadán. She won another Gaudí Award for Best Supporting Actress in 2014 for We All Want What's Best for Her. Segura won back-to-back Butaca Awards for Best Actress in 2018 and 2019 for her performances in the plays Les noies de Mossbank Road and La bona persona de Sezuan.

She made her solo directorial debut in a stage play in La trena (2022). She also featured as Diana in Elena Martín Gimeno's drama film Creatura (2023), portraying Diana, the mother of protagonist Mila, who was played among others by Martín Gimeno herself. Her performance earned her Gaudí and Goya award nominations for Best Supporting Actress.

== Filmography ==
=== Film ===
Year	Title	Role	Notes	Ref.
2003	Excuses!	Begoña		
2004	Mar adentro (The Sea Inside)	Gené		
2009	Les dues vides d'Andrés Rabadán	Sara		
2012	Una pistola en cada mano (A Gun in Each Hand)	Elena		
2013	Tots volem el millor per a ella (We All Want What's Best for Her)	Glòria		
2015	Barcelona, nit d'hivern (Barcelona Christmas Night)	Fina		
2018	Durante la tormenta (Mirage)	Hilda Weiss		
2023	Creatura	Diana		
2024	El 47 (The 47)	Carmen		
