= Manuel Bartual =

Spanish cartoonist and graphic designer (born 1979)

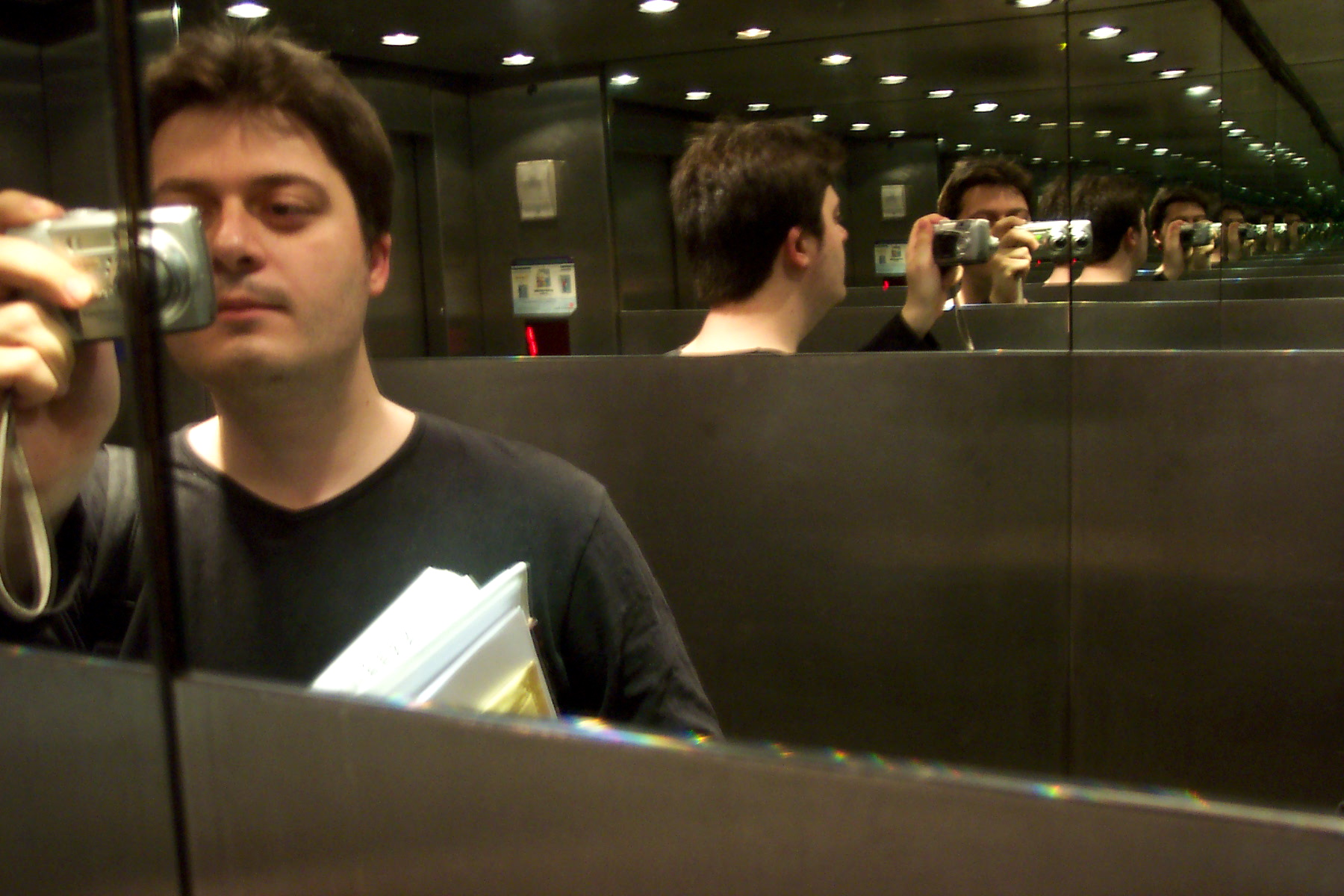
- Manuel Bartual
- Born: 1979 (age 45–46)

Manuel Bartual is a Spanish cartoonist and graphic designer born in Valencia in 1979.

== Biography ==
As a cartoonist he made the strips Morón el Pollastre, Álex and Con amigos como estos, alongside Manuel Castaño and published by 7 Monos.

As a designer he usually works for Grupo Editorial Santillana, El País, Ediciones Sinsentido, Dibbuks and, mainly, Astiberri Ediciones. He is responsible for the image of magazines such as TRAMA, Buen provecho, Noroeste and El Manglar. He has also collaborated with Lorenzo Gómez in the strip Reflexiones de un oficinista, serialized in the magazine TOS. From 2007 to 2014 he publishes the strip Sexorama in El Jueves.

In 2011, following the success of his fanzine Caramba!, he founded the publishing house of the same name.

In 2014 he wrote the script for the thriller Todos tus secretos. From 2014 to 2017 he published the strip Bienvenidos al futuro in the digital magazine Orgullo y satisfacción.

=== Twitter ===
In August 2017 he published on Twitter a thriller serialized story with himself as main character, about a mysterious man who follows him during his holidays. The story quickly became popular and he went from 16,000 to 408,000 followers. A year later, in August 2018 he wrote another story along Modesto García titled #REDMONKEY gaining 87000 retweets.

=== Podcast ===
In summer 2020 he created the science fiction podcast Biotopia, about a technology investigation centre where weird things happen.

== Work ==
Self-published comics

- Hermanas (junto con Nacho Sanmartín). 7 Monos, 1999.
- Morón el Pollastre (junto con Manuel Castaño). 7 Monos, 1999.
- Álex (junto con Manuel Castaño). 7 Monos, 2001.
- Con amigos como estos (alongside Manuel Castaño). 7 Monos, 2002.

Comic books

- Sexorama: El manual sexual de Manuel Bartual. El Jueves, 2009
- ¡Escucha esto! Astiberri, 2009.
- Sexorama. Consejos sexuales para chavalas y chavales (Astiberri, 2012)
- Sexorama. Donde caben dos caben tres (Astiberri, 2013)
- Erwin, el gato cuántico. Misterios a traves del tiempo (BEASCOA, 2023)
