= Little World =

- Directed by: Marcel Barrena
- Written by: Adrià Cuatrecases; Víctor Correal; Marcel Barrena
- Produced by: Víctor Correal; Adrià Cuatrecases; Oriol Maymó
- Cinematography: Albert Serradó; Víctor Torija
- Release date: 2012
- Country: Spain
- Languages: Catalan, Spanish, English

Little World (Catalan: Món petit) is a 2012 Catalan documentary film about Albert Casals, a young man who uses a wheelchair since suffering from leukemia at the age of five who travels the world without money, without companions, and without luggage.

The film mixes home video techniques and traditional documentary methods.

The director of the film is Marcel Barrena and is produced by Umbilical Produccions with TV3, TVE, ICAA, ICEC, and Corte y Confección de Películas.

== Awards and reviews ==
Little World has won on IDFA from Amsterdam (DOC U Award), where it also received an audience award. Little World has invited to the Palm Springs Fest from L.A. for three private screenings out of competition.

It was selected for 17 international film festivals, including: Best Documentary: Boulder Film Festival (USA); IDFA 2012: DocU Award; 3rd Audience Award. Norwegian Doc Film Festival: Audience Award. Palm Springs International Film Festival (out of competition). Bradford Film Festival. ZagrebDox (Croatia): Young Jury Award. Fic-Cat, Official Selection. Shanghai International Film Festival- Panorama. Gdansk DokFilm Festival: official Selection.

It was included as one of "the best 10 movies of the year" according to Neil Young (Jugsaw, The Hollywood Reporter).

== Cast ==
Albert Casals, Àlex Casals, Jordi Socías, Alba Casals, Gabriel Vilanova, Jennifer Vallejo, Anna Socías, Mont Serradó, Pilar Alamán, Pepita Moliné, Melanie Gordo, Anaïs Galván y la participación especial de Rarawa Kohere.
