= Alícia Falcó =

Spanish actress (born 2003)

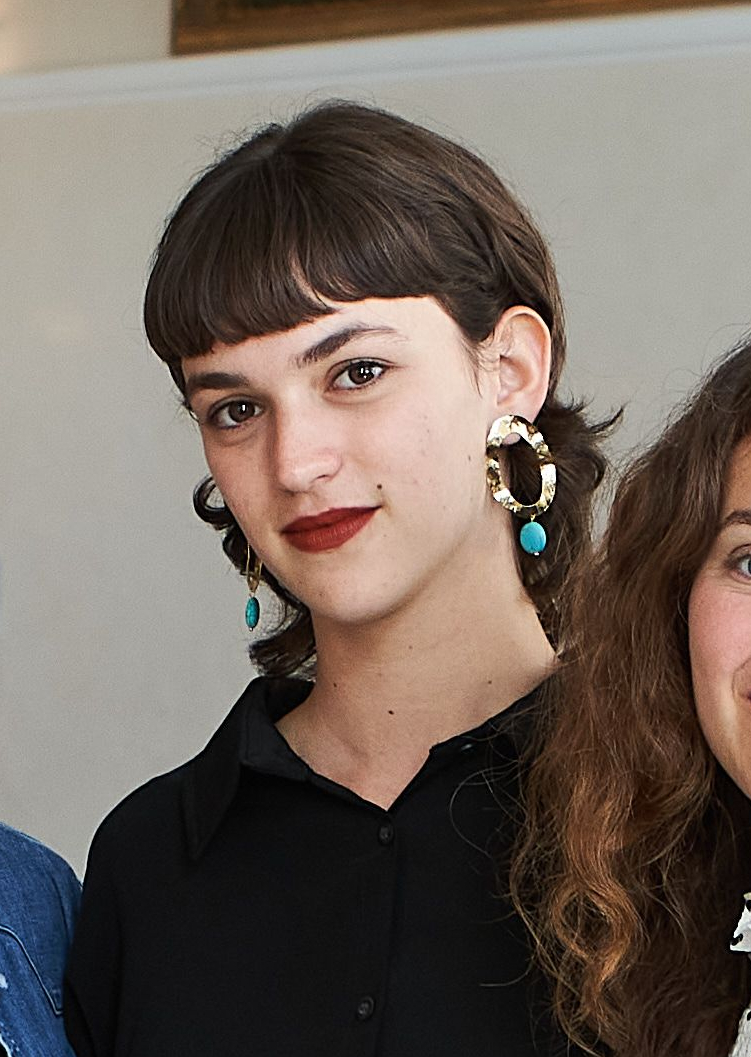
- Falcó in 2023
- Born: Alícia Falcó Martínez; 14 April 2003 (age 23); Barcelona, Catalonia, Spain
- Occupation: Actress

Alícia Falcó Martínez (born 14 April 2003) is a Spanish actress.

== Life and career ==
Alícia Falcó Martínez was born in Barcelona on 14 April 2003. She participated in theatre plays already at age 7 and began a formal acting education at age 8. She made her big screen debut as a child in The Fear (2013). She trained under Laura Jou and at the Eòlia Drama School. In 2021 she featured in the play Aquell dia tèrbol que vaig sortir d'un cinema de l'Eixample i vaig decidir convertir-me en un om directed by Alícia Gorina and staged at the Teatre Lliure. She played a minor role in the horror film 13 Exorcisms (2022) portraying a friend of the protagonist.

For her portrayal of a teenager becoming aware of the feminist struggle in the 1970s-set drama film In the Company of Women (2023), she earned a Best New Performance nomination at the 16th Gaudí Awards. Also in 2023, she joined the second season of the teen drama series Ser o no ser. She starred in the teen drama series Dieciocho.

In 2025, she starred as Asia Falcón in the thriller streaming series Billionaires' Bunker, and in the Wattpad adaptation Tell Me Softly, which gained her public visibility. She also joined the miniseries The Map of Longing in a leading role.
