= Aura Garrido =

Spanish actress

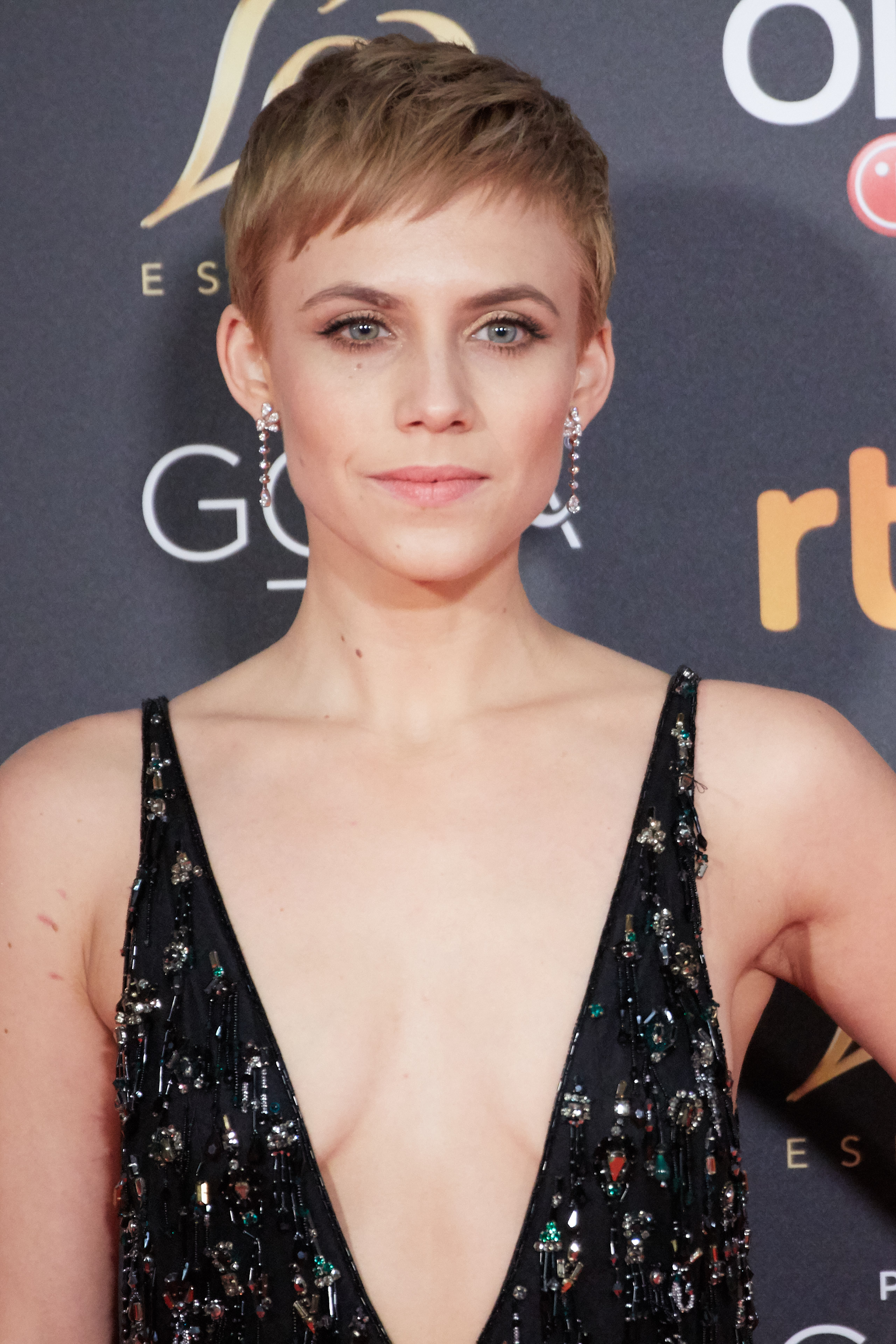
- Garrido in 2019
- Born: Aura Garrido Sánchez; 29 May 1989 (age 37); Madrid, Spain
- Occupation: Actress
- Years active: 2009–present

Aura Garrido Sánchez (born 29 May 1989) is a Spanish film and television actress. She has appeared in such films as Stockholm and the television series El ministerio del tiempo.

== Early life ==
Garrido was born in Madrid in 1989. Her father Tomás Garrido is a composer and orchestra conductor, and her mother, María del Pilar Sánchez, is a painter.

She took her first piano classes when she was four years old, and soon after, started practicing ballet. She speaks English thanks to having an English-speaking best friend growing up.

After ending her high school studies, she enrolled in the Real Escuela Superior de Arte Dramático, in Madrid, she took interpretation until her third year, specializing in textual interpretation, but she dropped out in 2010 because she was cast for the film Plans for Tomorrow. This role earned her the Silver Biznaga for Best Supporting Actress and a nomination to the Goya Award for Best New Actress.

== Career ==
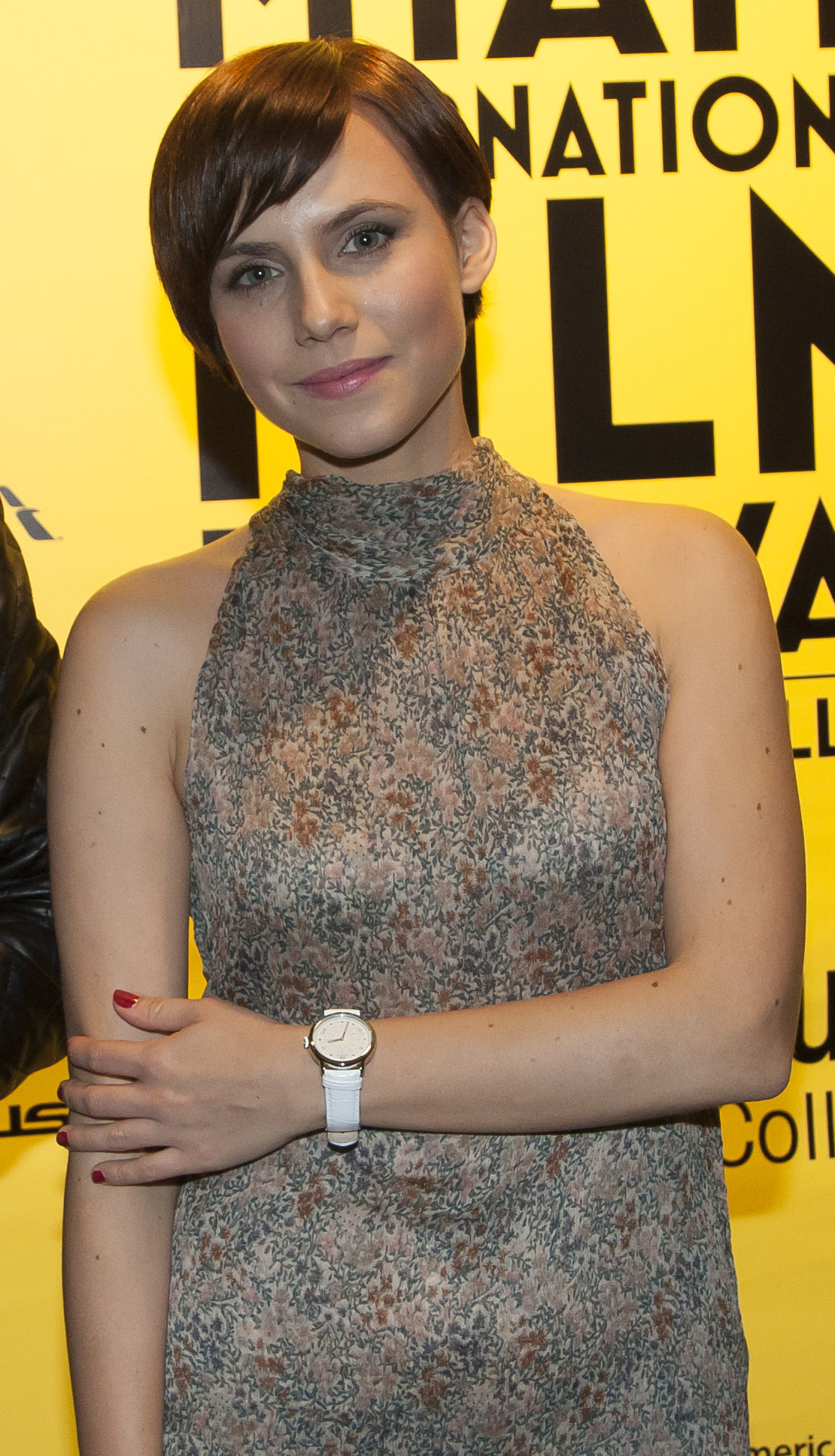
Garrido at the Miami Film Festival presentation of Innocent Killers

In 2010 she got her first main role in the Telecinco television series La pecera de Eva. Later, she centered her career in the small screen, and formed part of the Ángel o demonio, Crematorio and Imperium casts. She went back to working in cinema with two small roles in Promoción fantasma (2012) and El cuerpo, (2012). In 2013 she starred in Stockholm. For her performance, she won the Sant Jordi Award and a medal from the Círculo de Escritores Cinematográficos, and was nominated in the best actress category at the Goya Awards, the Feroz Awards and the Forqué Awards.

In 2014, on television again, she participated in the miniseries Hermanos and filmed Las aventuras del Capitán Alatriste although the latter was not broadcast until 2015. From 2015 through 2017, she played Amelia Folch in the Televisión Española series, El Ministerio del Tiempo.

In Someone Who Takes Care of Me (2023), Garrido played an actress at the peak of her career facing a family secret upending the relationship with her mother and grandmother.

In March 2025, she debuted in the play The Bitter Tears of Petra Von Kant (a Rakel Camacho's adaptation of Rainer Werner Fassbinder's play) at Nave 10 Matadero.

== Filmography ==
=== Film ===
Films
Year	Title	Role	Notes	Ref.
2010	Planes para mañana (Plans for Tomorrow)	Mónica		
2012	Promoción fantasma (Ghost Graduation)	Elsa		
2012	El cuerpo (The Body)	Carla Miller		
2013	Los ilusos (The Wishful Thinkers)	Sofía		
2013	Stockholm	She		
2013	Viral	Lucía		
2015	Vulcania	Marta		
2015	Asesinos inocentes (Innocent Killers)	Nuria Abreu		
2016	La reconquista (The Reconquest)	Clara		
2017	La niebla y la doncella (The Mist and the Maiden)	Virginia Chamorro		
2017	Cold Skin	Aneris		
2018	El aviso (The Warning)	Lucía		
2018	Solo	Ona		
2019	El asesino de los caprichos (The Goya Murders)	Eva González		
2019	El silencio de la ciudad blanca (El silencio de la ciudad blanca)	Estíbaliz Ruiz de Gauna		
2020	Malnazidos (Valley of the Dead)	Matacuras		
2023	Alguien que cuide de mí (Someone Who Takes Care of Me)	Nora		
2023	Amanece	Alba		
2024	Historias (Stories)			
2024	Daniela Forever	Teresa		
2025	La sospecha de Sofía (Sofia's Suspicion)	Sofía		

=== Television ===
Television
Year	Title	Role	Notes	Ref.
2009	Física o química	Erica	4 episodes	
2009	De repente, los Gómez	Silvia	10 episodes	
2010	La pecera de Eva	Esther		
2011	Ángel o demonio	Valeria		
2011	Crematorio	Miriam Mullor		
2012	Imperium	Cora	6 episodes	
2014	Hermanos	Pilar Yagüe		
2015	Las aventuras del Capitán Alatriste	Inés de Castro	13 episodes	
2015	La dama velata	Cecile		
2015	Víctor Ros	Lucía Alonso	1 Episode (Chapter 3)	
2015–17	El Ministerio del Tiempo	Amelia Folch		
2016	El padre de Caín	Begoña	Miniseries	
2018	El día de mañana	Carme Román	Miniseries	
2021	El inocente (The Innocent)	Olivia Costa		
2022	A Private Affair	Marina Quiroga		
2024	Santuario	Valle		
2024	Invisible	Profesora	Miniseries	

== Theatre ==
Theatre
Year	Title	Role	Theatre
2012	Cuando cuente hasta 3		Microtheatre of Calle 13
2013	Invierno en el Barrio Rojo		Teatro Español

== Accolades ==
Year	Award	Category	Work	Result	Ref.
2010	13th Málaga Film Festival	Silver Biznaga for Best Supporting Actress	Plans for Tomorrow	Won	
2011	66th CEC Medals	Best Newcomer	Plans for Tomorrow	Nominated	
2011	25th Goya Awards	Best New Actress	Plans for Tomorrow	Nominated	
2011	20th Actors and Actresses Union Awards	Best New Actress	Plans for Tomorrow	Nominated	
2013	16th Málaga Film Festival	Silver Biznaga for Best Actress	Stockholm	Won (Note: Tied with Candela Peña for Yesterday Never Ends)	
2013	2nd Neon Fan Awards	Best Spanish Actress	The Body	Nominated	
2014	19th Forqué Awards	Best Actress	Stockholm	Nominated	
2014	1st Feroz Awards	Best Main Actress	Stockholm	Nominated	
2014	28th Goya Awards	Best Actress	Stockholm	Nominated	
2014	64th Fotogramas de Plata	Best Film Actress	Stockholm	Nominated	
2014	58th Sant Jordi Awards	Best Actress	Stockholm	Won	
2014	69th CEC Medals	Best Actress	Stockholm	Won	
2014	13th Transilvania International Film Festival	Best Performance	Stockholm	Won (Note: Shared with co-star Javier Pereira)	
2016	25th Actors and Actresses Union Awards	Best Television Actress in a Leading Role	The Ministry of Time	Nominated	
2017	4th Feroz Awards	Best Main Actress in a Series	The Ministry of Time	Won	
2017	26th Actors and Actresses Union Awards	Best Television Actress in a Leading Role	The Ministry of Time	Won	
2018	5th Feroz Awards	Best Main Actress in a Series	The Ministry of Time	Nominated	
2018	27th Actors and Actresses Union Awards	Best Television Actress in a Leading Role	The Ministry of Time	Nominated	
2018	5th Platino Awards	Best Actress in a Miniseries or TV series	The Ministry of Time	Nominated	
2018	20th Iris Awards	Best Actress	What the Future Holds	Nominated	
2019	6th Feroz Awards	Best Main Actress in a Series	What the Future Holds	Nominated	
