= The Body (2012 film) =

2012 Spanish psychological thriller film by Oriol Paulo

- Theatrical release poster
- Spanish: El cuerpo
- Directed by: Oriol Paulo
- Written by: Oriol Paulo; Lara Sendim
- Produced by: Joaquín Padró; Mar Targarona; Mercedes Gamero; Mikel Lejarza
- Starring: José Coronado; Hugo Silva; Belén Rueda; Aura Garrido; Cristina Plazas; Montse Guallar; Nausicaa Bonnín
- Cinematography: Óscar Faura
- Edited by: Joan Manel Vilaseca
- Music by: Sergio Moure de Oteyza
- Production companies: Rodar y Rodar; Antena 3 Films; Televisió de Catalunya; Canal+
- Distributed by: Sony Pictures Releasing de España
- Release dates: 4 October 2012 (Sitges); 21 December 2012 (Spain)
- Running time: 107 minutes
- Country: Spain
- Language: Spanish
- Box office: $8.8 million

The Body (Spanish: El Cuerpo) is a 2012 Spanish psychological thriller film directed by Oriol Paulo, starring José Coronado, Hugo Silva, Belén Rueda and Aura Garrido. The plot concerns the events surrounding the disappearance of a female body (Rueda) from a morgue. The widower (Silva) who has been carrying on a secret affair with his mistress (Garrido) is considered the main suspect by an inspector (Coronado) trying to unravel the mystery.

The screenplay was penned by Paulo alongside Lara Sendim. The film was produced by Joaquín Padró, Mar Targarona, Mercedes Gamero, and Mikel Lejarza for Rodar y Rodar, Antena 3 Films, TVC and Canal+.

The film has been remade in multiple countries.

== Plot ==
Inspector Jaime Peña investigates an accident that has left the morgue's night watchman Ángel Torres in a coma. Security footage reveals Ángel fleeing from his post before being struck by a car. Peña learns that the body of a woman, Mayka Villaverde, is missing. Mayka, a wealthy middle-aged businesswoman, was married to Álex Ulloa, a younger man, and suffered a heart attack following a business trip.

Álex hears the news while with his mistress, Carla Miller, and assures her that Mayka is dead. At the morgue, Álex tells the coroner about Mayka's medical history. Peña is convinced someone stole the body to avoid an autopsy and is suspicious of Álex, who Peña feels too easily speaks of his wife in the past tense. Peña, conversely, still speaks of his wife Ruth, who died 10 years ago in a car accident, in the present tense.

Álex hears a loud noise and discovers a busted locker containing a bottle labeled TH–16. It is revealed he put the contents of the exact bottle into Mayka's wine earlier in the day. Peña informs Álex that Mayka's cell phone is missing. Caught with the bottle, Álex admits it is a toxin manufactured by Mayka's pharmaceutical company, but denies knowing what it does.

More strange events occur at the morgue that seems to target Álex and Carla, convincing Álex that Mayka is still alive and seeking revenge for his affair and murder plot. Álex discovers Mayka hired a private investigator, as she suspected his affair, and had also heard him plotting death. Álex started confessing to Peña. He admits lacing her wine with TH–16, which causes a heart attack after eight hours and leaves no trace in the blood. He is convinced Mayka did not drink the wine and faked her death with a tranquilizer.

The police discover incriminating evidence at Álex and Mayka's house, including a map of the morgue. Ángel wakes up from his coma and reveals that after hearing a noise, he saw Mayka's body in the elevator before a figure in a balaclava fired a gun at him, sending him running into the street. Álex insists Mayka is alive and has the means to disappear and that Carla is in danger. Peña informs him they have no evidence Carla Miller exists and that the address he gave for Carla's apartment has been empty for years.

While transporting Álex, the police discover a body in the woods, which turns out to be Mayka's. Álex flees into the woods and collapses, as Peña closes in on him. Peña tells Álex his wife could have been saved if the other driver, who caused the collision, had called for help instead of fleeing. Peña recalls him and his daughter Eva watching helplessly as Ruth died. Following clues that Eva recalls, Peña learned it was Álex and Mayka who had fled the scene and left Ruth to die.

Peña then shows Álex a photo of his daughter Eva: Carla Miller. It was Peña and Eva who had taken Mayka's body and conspired to frame him. Eva initially wasn't convinced of their guilt until Álex himself confided to her that he caused the hit-and-run. Álex, now gasping to breathe, learns that eight hours earlier, Eva had dosed him with TH–16, and his death will be explained as a heart attack brought on by stress.

== Cast ==
- José Coronado as Jaime Peña
- Belén Rueda as Mayka Villaverde Freire
- Hugo Silva as Alejandro "Álex" Ulloa Marcos
- Aura Garrido as Carla Miller / Eva Peña
- Juan Pablo Shuk as Pablo
- Cristina Plazas as Silvia Tapia
- Oriol Vila as Mateos
- Nausicaa Bonnín as Patricia
- Montse Guallar

== Release ==
The film was presented as the opening film of the 45th Sitges Film Festival in October 2012. Distributed by Sony Pictures Releasing de España, it was released theatrically in Spain on 21 December 2012.

== Critical reception ==
Roger Moore of Movie Nation gave it 3 out of 4 and called it "A lean, moody and superior horror thriller from Spain."

== Accolades ==
Year	Award	Category	Nominee(s)	Result	Ref.
2013	68th CEC Medals	Best New Director	Oriol Paulo	Nominated	
2013	27th Goya Awards	Best New Director	Oriol Paulo	Nominated	
2014	19th Forqué Awards	Best Film		Nominated	
2014	6th Gaudí Awards	Best Non-Catalan Language Film		Nominated	
2014	6th Gaudí Awards	Best Sound	Albert Manera, Oriol Tarragó, David Calleja	Nominated	
2014	6th Gaudí Awards	Best Special/Visual Effects	Lluís Castells, Lluís Rivera, David Martí, Montse Ribé	Nominated	

== Remakes ==
The film was unofficially remade into a Tamil-Kannada bilingual movie Game in 2016. A Korean remake titled The Vanished was released on 7 March 2018. The film was remade in 2019 in Hindi under the same title by Jeethu Joseph, in his directorial debut in Hindi, with Rishi Kapoor, Emraan Hashmi, and Sobhita Dhulipala in the lead. An Italian remake, called Il corpo, was released in Italian cinemas on 28 November 2024, and in Indonesia, a remake called Dendam Malam Kelam (English title: Vengeance in the Dreary Night) was released in May 2025, featuring Indonesian actors Arya Saloka and Marissa Anita as well as Malaysian actor Bront Palarae.

== See also ==
- List of Spanish films of 2012
