= The 47 =

- Theatrical release poster
- Catalan: El 47
- Directed by: Marcel Barrena
- Screenplay by: Marcel Barrena; Alberto Marini
- Produced by: Laura Fdez. Espeso; Javier Méndez
- Starring: Eduard Fernández; Clara Segura; Zoe Bonafonte; Salva Reina; Óscar de la Fuente; Betsy Túrnez; Vicente Romero; Carlos Cuevas; David Verdaguer
- Cinematography: Isaac Vila
- Edited by: Nacho Ruiz Capillas
- Music by: Arnau Bataller
- Production company: The Mediapro Studio
- Distributed by: A Contracorriente Films
- Release date: 6 September 2024
- Running time: 110 minutes
- Country: Spain
- Languages: Catalan; Spanish
- Box office: €4.0 million

The 47 (Catalan: El 47) is a 2024 Spanish historical drama film directed by Marcel Barrena and written by Barrena and Alberto Marini. It stars Eduard Fernández alongside Clara Segura and Zoe Bonafonte, exploring the true story of the hijacking of a bus in 1978 in Barcelona as a form of civil disobedience.

The film was released theatrically by A Contracorriente Films on 6 September 2024. It won five awards at the 39th Goya Awards, including Best Picture, Best Supporting Actor (Salva Reina), and Best Supporting Actress (Segura).

== Plot ==
The film takes place in Barcelona in 1978. Incensed by the contempt faced by impoverished Extremaduran and Andalusian immigrant communities in the city outskirts, bus driver Manolo Vital hijacks a vehicle of the 47 bus line, in order to debunk the local government's lie that buses could not reach the Torre Baró neighborhood.

== Cast ==
- Eduard Fernández as Manolo Vital
- Clara Segura as Carmen
- Zoe Bonafonte as Joana
- Salva Reina as Felipín
- Óscar de la Fuente as Antonio
- Betsy Túrnez as Aurora
- Vicente Romero as Ortega
- Carlos Cuevas as Pasqual
- David Verdaguer as Serra
- Aimar Vega as Josep
- Borja Espinosa as el Rubio
- Carme Sansa
- Francesc Ferrer

== Production ==
The screenplay was written by Marcel Barrena and Alberto Marini. The film is a The Mediapro Studio production. It had the participation of Movistar Plus+, RTVE, 3Cat, and Triodos Bank, the backing from ICEC and funding from ICO. It was shot in between June and July 2023. Shooting locations in the province of Barcelona included Plaça de Catalunya, the Barcelona City Hall, and the Torre Baró neighborhood.

Valeria Castro composed the film's main song, "El borde del mundo".

== Release ==
Distributed by A Contracorriente Films, the film was released theatrically in Spain on 6 September 2024 in 175 screens. It grossed over €240,000 in its opening weekend, with the seventh-largest gross and second-best gross per screen ratio in the Spanish box office.

By February 2025, the film had grossed around €3.4 million. By March 2025, it had grossed around €4 million.

The film was released theatrically in Greece on 3 July 205 by Weird Wave and in Australia and New Zealand on 10 July 2025 by Palace Films. It was also sold in the United States and Canada (Myriad Pictures), Italy (Movies Inspired), Poland (Mañana), and India (BookMyShow).

== Reception ==
On the review aggregator website Rotten Tomatoes, 100% of 10 critics' reviews are positive.

Blai Morell of Fotogramas rated the film 4 out of 5 stars, deeming it to be "a splendid film that deals about the neighborhood struggle as an engine of change in the search for the common good", highlighting the "spectacular" work delivered by the "entire" cast as the best thing about it.

Toni Vall of Cinemanía rated the film 4 out of 5 stars, considering it to be Barrena's best film, "a work of craftsmanship, everything [in it] exudes authenticity".

Philipp Engel of La Vanguardia, rated the film 3 out of 5 stars, declaring it a "good film, full of good intentions as it appeals to solidarity and civil movements" [rallying no other banner] "than that of just causes", while also pointing out that "it never ceases to be a conventional and predictable" story.

The film did not fully please the colleagues of Manolo Vital in neighborhood and political activism; they criticised a biased narrative in the film depicting Vital as a lone hero, shunning his membership in the Workers' Commissions (CC.OO.) and the Unified Socialist Party of Catalonia (PSUC).

== Accolades ==
Year	Award	Category	Nominee(s)	Result	Ref.
2024	30th Forqué Awards	Best Film		Won	
2024	30th Forqué Awards	Cinema and Education in Values		Won	
2025	17th Gaudí Awards	Best Film		Won	
2025	17th Gaudí Awards	Best Director	Marcel Barrena	Nominated	
2025	17th Gaudí Awards	Best Original Screenplay	Marcel Barrena, Alberto Marini	Nominated	
2025	17th Gaudí Awards	Best Actor	Eduard Fernández	Won	
2025	17th Gaudí Awards	Best Supporting Actress	Betsy Túrnez	Nominated	
2025	17th Gaudí Awards	Best Supporting Actress	Clara Segura	Won	
2025	17th Gaudí Awards	Best Supporting Actor	Carlos Cuevas	Nominated	
2025	17th Gaudí Awards	Best Supporting Actor	David Verdaguer	Nominated	
2025	17th Gaudí Awards	Best New Performance	Zoe Bonafonte	Nominated	
2025	17th Gaudí Awards	Best Production Supervision	Carlos Apolinario	Won	
2025	17th Gaudí Awards	Best Original Score	Arnau Bataller	Nominated	
2025	17th Gaudí Awards	Best Cinematography	Isaac Vila	Nominated	
2025	17th Gaudí Awards	Best Editing	Nacho Ruiz Capillas	Nominated	
2025	17th Gaudí Awards	Best Art Direction	Marta Bazaco	Nominated	
2025	17th Gaudí Awards	Best Costume Design	Olga Rodal, Irantzu Ortiz	Won	
2025	17th Gaudí Awards	Best Makeup and Hairstyles	Karol Tornaria	Won	
2025	17th Gaudí Awards	Best Sound	Eva Valiño, Fabiola Ordoyo, Yasmina Praderas	Nominated	
2025	17th Gaudí Awards	Best Visual Effects	Laura Canals, Iván López Hernández	Won	
2025	17th Gaudí Awards	Special Audience Award		Won	
2025	12th Feroz Awards	Best Screenplay in a Film	Marcel Barrena, Beto Marini	Nominated	
2025	12th Feroz Awards	Best Supporting Actress in a Film	Clara Segura	Won	
2025	12th Feroz Awards	Best Original Soundtrack	Arnau Bataller	Nominated	
2025	4th Carmen Awards	Best Non-Andalusian Produced Film		Nominated	
2025	80th CEC Medals	Best Film		Nominated	
2025	80th CEC Medals	Best Director	Marcel Barrena	Nominated	
2025	80th CEC Medals	Best Original Screenplay	Alberto Marini, Marcel Barrena	Nominated	
2025	80th CEC Medals	Best Actor	Eduard Fernández	Nominated	
2025	80th CEC Medals	Best Supporting Actor	Salva Reina	Nominated	
2025	80th CEC Medals	Best Supporting Actress	Clara Segura	Nominated	
2025	80th CEC Medals	Best New Actress	Zoe Bonafonte	Nominated	
2025	80th CEC Medals	Best Cinematography	Isaac Vila	Nominated	
2025	80th CEC Medals	Best Editing	Nacho Ruiz Capillas	Nominated	
2025	80th CEC Medals	Best Music	Arnau Bataller	Nominated	
2025	39th Goya Awards	Best Film		Won	
2025	39th Goya Awards	Best Original Screenplay	Alberto Marini, Marcel Barrena	Nominated	
2025	39th Goya Awards	Best Supporting Actress	Clara Segura	Won	
2025	39th Goya Awards	Best Supporting Actor	Salva Reina	Won	
2025	39th Goya Awards	Best New Actress	Zoe Bonafonte	Nominated	
2025	39th Goya Awards	Best Cinematography	Isaac Vila	Nominated	
2025	39th Goya Awards	Best Editing	Nacho Ruiz Capillas	Nominated	
2025	39th Goya Awards	Best Original Score	Arnau Bataller	Nominated	
2025	39th Goya Awards	Best Art Direction	Marta Bazaco	Nominated	
2025	39th Goya Awards	Best Production Supervision	Carlos Apolinario	Won	
2025	39th Goya Awards	Best Original Song	"El borde del mundo" by Valeria Castro	Nominated	
2025	39th Goya Awards	Best Costume Design	Irantzu Ortiz, Olga Rodal	Nominated	
2025	39th Goya Awards	Best Makeup and Hairstyles	Karol Tornaría	Nominated	
2025	39th Goya Awards	Best Special Effects	Laura Canals, Iván López Hernández	Won	
2025	33rd Actors and Actresses Union Awards	Best Film Actress in a Secondary Role	Clara Segura	Won	
2025	33rd Actors and Actresses Union Awards	Best Film Actor in a Minor Role	Carlos Cuevas	Won	
2025	33rd Actors and Actresses Union Awards	Best New Actress	Zoe Bonafonte	Won	
2025	8th ALMA Awards	Best Screenplay in a Drama Film	Marcel Barrena, Alberto Marini	Nominated	
2025	12th Platino Awards	Best Ibero-American Film		Nominated	
2025	12th Platino Awards	Best Supporting Actress	Clara Segura	Won	
2025	67th Ariel Awards	Best Ibero-American Film		Nominated	

== See also ==
- List of Spanish films of 2024
