= Gaudí Awards =

Annual film awards in Catalonia, Spain

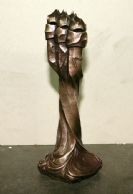
- Trophy that winners receive
- Type: Film Awards
- Location: Catalonia, Spain
- Presented by: Acadèmia del Cinema Català
- First award: 2009
- Website: Gaudí Awards

The Gaudí Awards (Catalan: Premis Gaudí) are the main film awards of Catalonia, celebrated annually in Barcelona. The awards were established in 2009 by the Catalan Film Academy as a continuation and expansion of the Barcelona Cinema Awards (Premis Barcelona de Cinema), originally established in 2002.

The trophy was designed by Montse Ribé and is inspired by the chimneys of Antoni Gaudí's Casa Milà.

== Award categories ==
- Gaudí Honorary Award: since 2009; now called Miquel Porter Gaudí Honorary Award
- Gaudí Award for Best Film in Catalan Language: since 2009
- Gaudí Award for Best Non-Catalan Language Film: since 2009
- Gaudí Award for Best Director: since 2009
- Gaudí Award for Best Documentary: since 2009
- Gaudí Award for Best Animated Feature Film: since 2009
- Gaudí Award for Best TV Film: since 2009
- Gaudí Award for Best European Film: since 2009
- Gaudí Award for Best Original Screenplay: since 2009
- Gaudí Award for Best Actress in a Leading Role: since 2009
- Gaudí Award for Best Actor in a Leading Role: since 2009
- Gaudí Award for Best Actress in a Supporting Role: since 2009
- Gaudí Award for Best Actor in a Supporting Role: since 2009
- Gaudí Award for Best Cinematography: since 2009
- Gaudí Award for Best Original Score: since 2009
- Gaudí Award for Best Film Editing: since 2009
- Gaudí Award for Best Art Direction: since 2009
- Gaudí Award for Best Visual Effectes: since 2009
- Gaudí Award for Best Sound: since 2009
- Gaudí Award for Best Short Film: since 2009
- Gaudí Award for Best Costume Design: since 2010
- Gaudí Award for Best Makeup: since 2010
- Gaudí Award for Best Production Director: since 2010

== Ceremonies ==
The following is a listing of all Gaudí Awards ceremonies:

Ceremony	Date	Best Film in Catalan Language	Host(s)	Venue	Ref.
1st Gaudí Awards	January 19, 2009	El cant dels ocells (Birdsong)	Clara Segura	Coliseum (Barcelona)	
2nd Gaudí Awards	February 1, 2010	Tres dies amb la família (Three Days With The Family)	Dafnis Balduz, Santi Ibáñez, Santi Millán, Clara Segura	Coliseum (Barcelona)	
3rd Gaudí Awards	January 17, 2011	Pa negre (Black Bread)	Quim Masferrer	Artèria Paral·lel (Barcelona)	
4th Gaudí Awards	February 6, 2012	EVA	Xavi Mira, Alba Florejachs	Artèria Paral·lel (Barcelona)	
5th Gaudí Awards	February 3, 2013	Blancaneu (Snow White)	Andreu Buenafuente	Palau dels Esports (Barcelona)	
6th Gaudí Awards	February 2, 2014	La plaga (The Plague)	Àngel Llàcer	Palau dels Esports (Barcelona)	
7th Gaudí Awards	February 1, 2015	Rastres de Sàndal (Traces of Sandalwood)	Àngel Llàcer	Sant Jordi Club (Barcelona)	
8th Gaudí Awards	January 31, 2016	El camí més llarg per tornar a casa (The Long Way Home)	Rossy de Palma	Forum Auditorium (Barcelona)	
9th Gaudí Awards	January 29, 2017	La propera pell (The Next Skin)	Bruno Oro	Forum Auditorium (Barcelona)	
10th Gaudí Awards	January 28, 2018	Estiu 1993 (Summer 1993)	David Verdaguer	Forum Auditorium (Barcelona)	
11th Gaudí Awards	January 27, 2019	Les distàncies (Distances)	Mag Lari	Congress Palace of Catalonia (Barcelona)	
12th Gaudí Awards	January 19, 2020	Els dies que vindran (The Days to Come)	Anna Moliner	International Barcelona Convention Center (Barcelona)	
13th Gaudí Awards	March 21, 2021	La vampira de Barcelona (The Barcelona Vampiress)	No host	International Barcelona Convention Center (Barcelona)	
14th Gaudí Awards	March 6, 2022	Sis dies corrents (The Odd-Job Men)	No host	MNAC's Oval Room (Barcelona)	
15th Gaudí Awards	January 22, 2023	Alcarràs	Llum Barrera	MNAC's Oval Room (Barcelona)	
16th Gaudí Awards	February 4, 2024	Creatura	Maria Rovira, Ana Polo	International Barcelona Convention Center (Barcelona)	
17th Gaudí Awards	January 18, 2025	El 47 (The 47)	Marc Clotet, Paula Malia, Marta Torné, Pep Ambròs	Auditori Fòrum CCIB (Barcelona)	
18th Gaudí Awards	February 8, 2026	Frontera (Frontier)	Nora Navas, Maria Molins, Laura Weissmahr, Carla Quílez, Maria Arnal	Gran Teatre del Liceu (Barcelona)	
