= Mikel Lejarza (producer) =

Spanish audiovisual producer

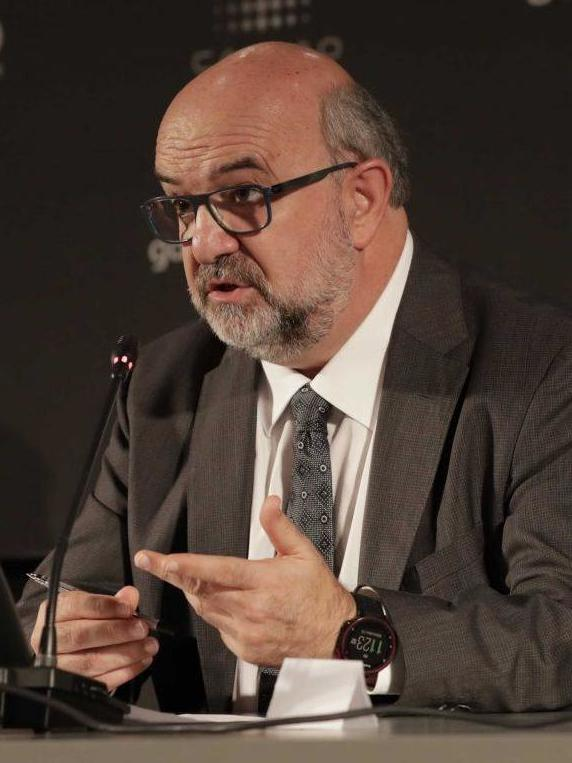
- Lejarza in October 2017 in Madrid
- Born: Mikel Lejarza Ortiz; 1956 (age 68–69); Bilbao, Spain
- Education: Complutense University of Madrid (Lic.); University of Deusto (PhD)
- Occupation: Film producer

Mikel Lejarza Ortiz (born 1956) is a Spanish audiovisual producer. He became the president of A3 Films (later Atresmedia Cine) in 2010.

== Biography ==
Mikel Lejarza Ortiz was born in Bilbao in 1956. He earned a licenciate degree in Geography and History from the Complutense University of Madrid and a PhD in Communication Sciences from the University of Deusto. He began a career as a journalist working for El Correo and Radio Popular. He earned a post in ETB in 1983 after passing competitive examination, later working for Tele 5 and Grupo Árbol. He joined Grupo Antena 3 in 2006, helming the company's film studio (Antena 3 Films/Atresmedia Cine) after 2010.

== Filmography ==
Producer

- Marshland (2014)
- Toro (2016)
- Smoke & Mirrors (2016)
- May God Save Us (2016)
- The Queen of Spain (2016)
- The Invisible Guest (2016)
- The Bar (2017)
- Gold (2017)
- The Realm (2018)
- Klaus (2019)
