= Yesterday Never Ends =

2013 Spanish drama film

- Spanish theatrical release poster
- Spanish: Ayer no termina nunca
- Directed by: Isabel Coixet
- Written by: Isabel Coixet
- Starring: Javier Cámara; Candela Peña
- Release date: 23 April 2013
- Running time: 108 minutes
- Country: Spain
- Language: Spanish

Yesterday Never Ends (Spanish: Ayer no termina nunca) is a 2013 drama film written and directed by Isabel Coixet. It stars Javier Cámara and Candela Peña.

== Plot ==
2017. J. flies in from Germany into Barcelona, in crisis-hit Spain, to meet C. after spending five years stranged. Waiting for someone to come in an abandoned building, they speak about trivial topics, while some flashbacks show her insulting him. When C. goes to the bathroom, J. speaks on the phone in German. C. accuses J. of having abandoned her five years ago, on New Year's Eve. He apologises. It surfaces that they are both waiting for a government official of some kind to tackle some burocracy related to Dani, their deceased son. She blames J. for their son's death, as he was not there to help and it took five hours to get the child assistance in a country that was severely hit by the economic crisis and with hospitals collapsed.

She lives in her car now, occupies houses and complains about life conditions in Spain. They argue and J. is about to leave, but C. hugs him. Immediately afterwards, J. tells her that he is married to another woman now and that they are expecting a child. He also tells her that he is writing a book with elements of his life. She reprimands him for writing what she deems a self-help book with their dead child's story as inspiration. They keep on arguing about which the correct way to experience the pain is. C. presses J. to unveil more details about his new marriage.

J. leaves, but then comes back and lets C. know that he is aware that everything is a lie and that no official is coming, because the building is not what she told him it was. They both seem to reconcile and reflect on nice memories. The conversation focuses on Dani once again and J. also explains why he left her on New Year's Eve: because he could not bear anymore how she was coping with the loss. He confesses that the song "It Must Be So" by Leonard Bernstein helped him move forward once he was in Germany. Before leaving, they hug while he sings the song. He then asks her to visit Dani's grave together, but she refuses. He visits the grave and cries inconsolably in front of it. She appears and hugs him from behind. In a flashback, they dance together and kiss.

== Cast ==
- Javier Cámara as J.
- Candela Peña as C.

== Production ==
The script was written by Isabel Coixet, who also directed the film. It is a Spanish co-production by A Contracorriente Films and Miss Wasabi.

== Release ==
The film had its world premiere in the Panorama section of the 63rd Berlin International Film Festival. It was then released theatrically in Spain on 26 April 2013.

== Reception ==
Jonathan Holland, a critic for The Hollywood Reporter, praised the film for its portrayal of "the emotional damage done by the economic crisis." "The demanding but often rewarding result casts the audience in the role of uncomfortable voyeur," he wrote. Jordi Batlle Caminal, in La Vanguardia, argued that the film is filled with "life and emotion" thanks to the "touching" performances by Cámara and Peña. Carlos Boyero, writing for El País, described the film as "two characters speaking forever" and lamented that "everything is intense", which he found "exhausting". "The results are not as convincing as the intentions," stated Javier Ocaña, writing for the same newspaper. He praised both actors, nonetheless, deeming their work as "irreproachable".

== See also ==
- List of Spanish films of 2013
