= Nora Navas =

Spanish actress

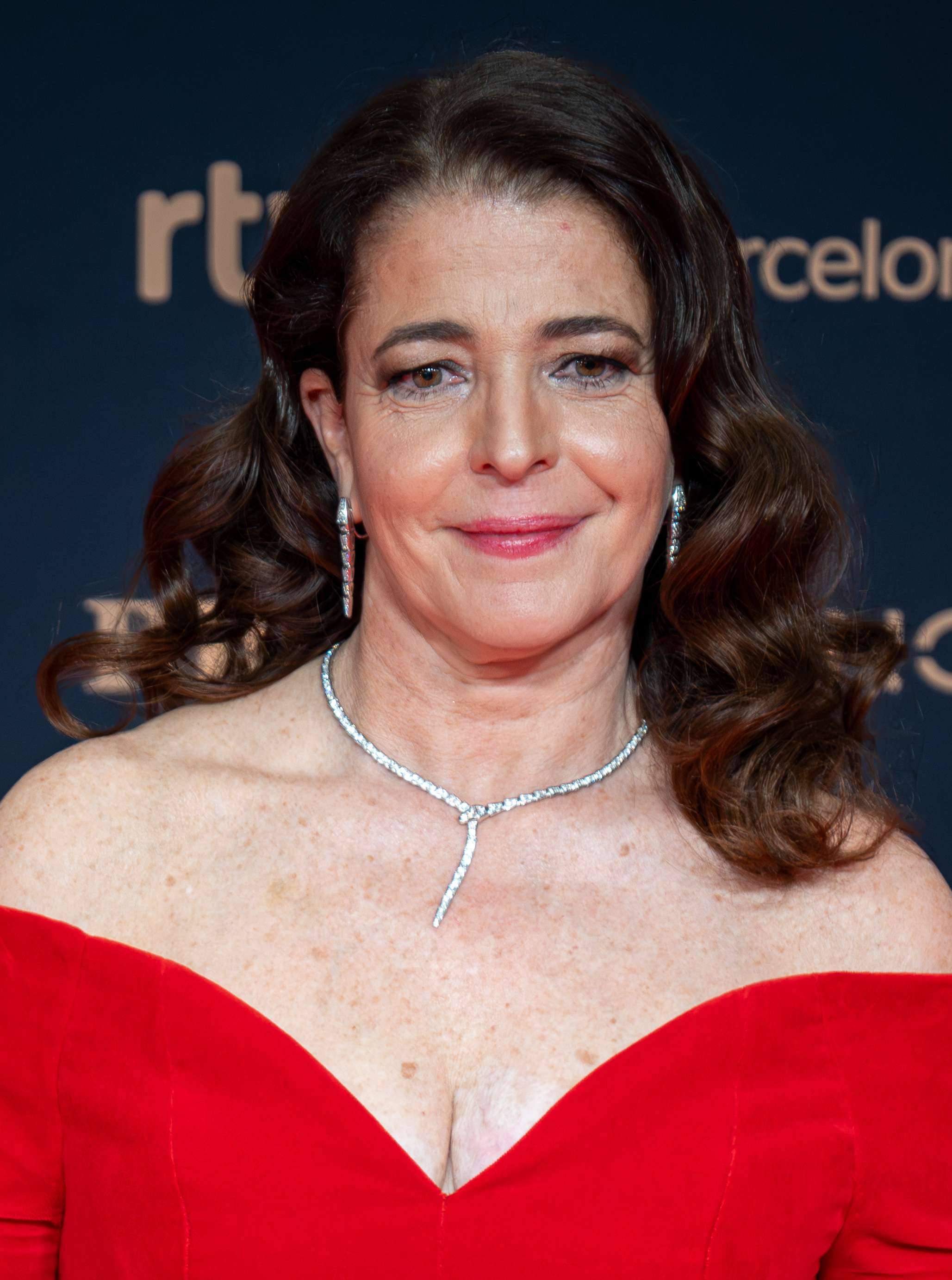
- Navas in 2026
- Born: Nora Navas García; 24 April 1975 (age 51); Barcelona, Spain
- Occupation: Actress

Nora Navas García (born 24 April 1975) is a Spanish actress.

== Biography ==
Navas was born on 24 April 1975 in Barcelona. She has a distinguished and prolific career, ranging from theater to film, through TV movies and series. Her performance in Black Bread (2010) earned her the Silver Shell in the San Sebastián International Film Festival, the Gaudí Award, and the Goya Award.

== Filmography ==
Year	Title	Role	Notes	Ref.
1999	Un banc al parc as	Susanna		
2003	Cualquiera	Sandra		
2006	Lo bueno de llorar			
2006	Las vidas de Celia (Celia's Lives)	Marta		
2010	Pa negre (Black Bread)	Florència		
2012	Dictado (Childish Games)	Beatriz		
2012	Miel de naranjas (Orange Honey)	Miel		
2013	Tots volem el millor per a ella (We All Want What's Best for Her)	Geni		
2014	Tres mentiras	Violeta		
2015	Felices 140 (Happy 140)	Martina		
2015	The Invisible Artery	Carme		
2016	Rumbos (Night Tales)	María		
2018	Durante la tormenta (Mirage)	Clara Medina		
2019	Dolor y gloria (Pain and Glory)	Mercedes		
2020	Adú	Carmen		
2020	La vampira de Barcelona (The Barcelona Vampiress)	Enriqueta Martí		
2021	Libertad	Teresa		
2023	Unicornios (Unicorns)	Mercè		
2025	Mi amiga Eva (My Friend Eva)	Eva		
2026	Zeta (Agent Zeta)	Elena		

== TV movies ==
- Trenhotel as Carmen (2007)
- Más que hermanos as Marta (2005)
- Mirage as Clare (2018)

== Television series ==
- El Cor de la Ciutat as Anna (2006–2007)
- Jet lag (2006)
- Porca Misèria as Marta (2005–2006)
- Ventdelplà as Laura (2005)
- Pagats per riure (2001)
- Crims (2000)
- Programa más o menos multiplicado o dividido (1996)

== Theatre ==
- Assaigs oberts: A partir de la màquina Hamlet, Heiner Müller (2003)
- Fuera de cuadro (2003)
- 4d òptic (2003)
- Les tres germanes as Irina (2004) (Three sisters)
- Calígula as Mucius' wife (2004)
- Tennessee (2006)
- La fam (2006)
- La casa de Bernarda Alba (2009)

== Accolades ==
Year	Award	Category	Work	Result	Ref.
2010	58th San Sebastián International Film Festival	Silver Shell for Best Actress	Black Bread	Won	
2011	3rd Gaudí Awards	Best Actress	Black Bread	Won	
2011	25th Goya Awards	Best Actress	Black Bread	Won	
2013	58th Valladolid International Film Festival	Best Actress	We All Want What's Best for Her	Won	
2014	19th Forqué Awards	Best Actress	We All Want What's Best for Her	Nominated	
2014	1st Feroz Awards	Best Main Actress in a Film	We All Want What's Best for Her	Nominated	
2014	69th CEC Medals	Best Actress	We All Want What's Best for Her	Nominated	
2014	6th Gaudí Awards	Best Actress	We All Want What's Best for Her	Won	
2014	28th Goya Awards	Best Actress	We All Want What's Best for Her	Nominated	
2016	3rd Feroz Awards	Best Main Actress in a Film	The Adoption	Nominated	
2016	8th Gaudí Awards	Best Actress	The Adoption	Nominated	
2016	30th Goya Awards	Best Supporting Actress	Happy 140	Nominated	
2020	12th Gaudí Awards	Best Supporting Actress	Pain and Glory	Nominated	
2021	13th Gaudí Awards	Best Actress	The Barcelona Vampiress	Nominated	
2022	36th Goya Awards	Best Supporting Actress	Libertad	Won	
2022	14th Gaudí Awards	Best Supporting Actress	Libertad	Nominated	
2025	12th Feroz Awards	Best Supporting Actress in a Series	I, Addict	Won	
2025	31st Forqué Awards	Best Actress in a Film	My Friend Eva	Nominated	
2026	13th Feroz Awards	Best Main Actress in a Film	My Friend Eva	Nominated	
2026	18th Gaudí Awards	Best Actress	My Friend Eva	Nominated	
2026	81st CEC Medals	Best Actress	My Friend Eva	Nominated	
2026	40th Goya Awards	Best Actress	My Friend Eva	Nominated	
