= Pau Durà =

- Born: 1972 (age 53–54); Alcoy, Valencia, Spain
- Occupations: Actor, director
- Known for: Merlí; Plats bruts

Pau Durà (born 1972) is a Spanish actor and director of film, theater, and television, known for his roles in Merlí and Plats bruts. He received a diploma in interpretation from the Superior School of Dramatic Art at the Institut del Teatre in Barcelona, where he was from 1990 to 1993.

He joined the cast of the Telecinco series 7 vidas in September 2000, its third season, playing Alex, a brother of Paco (Javier Cámara). In 2011, he appeared in the Canal+ series Crematorio, playing Zarrategui, the lawyer for the Bertomeu family. Durà says "Zarrategui is an effective lawyer and is congruent with his goals, is neat, and a little mysterious. I do my job, I love him and I try to do my best as a lawyer, without entering into moral disquisitions."

In 2014, he joined the Telecinco series El Príncipe, playing Serra, the head of the CNI. At the time he created the persona, he referenced Russell Crowe's work in the film Body of Lies. In 2014, he directed Un aire de familia, by Agnès Jaoui and Jean-Pierre Bacri, at the Romea Theater in Barcelona. It was nominated for 5 Premios Max in 2014, among them Best Director and Best Theater Show, and 7 Butaca Awards, among them Best Director and Best Show. It is the Catalan version of Como en las mejores familias, which Durá acted in 2004 with Javier Cámara, Blanca Portillo, Julieta Serrano, Nathalie Poza and Gonzalo de Castro. That same year, he co-directed Ulisses in Berlin, by Francesc Sanguino, at the Rialto Theater in Valencia.

Since September 2015, he has played Toni in the TV3 series Merlí, the director of the Àngel Guimerà Institute and a work companion of the protagonist, Merlí. In 2017, he directed his first feature film, Formentera Lady, starring José Sacristán, filmed in Formentera, Denia, Valencia, and Barcelona.
