= Clotet =

Clotet is a surname. Notable people with the surname include:

- Aina Clotet (born 1982), Spanish actress and director
- Bonaventura Clotet (born 1953), Spanish physician
- Joaquim Clotet (born 1946), president of the Pontifícia Universidade Católica do Rio Grande do Sul
- Marc Clotet (born 1980), Spanish actor and model
- Pep Clotet (born 1977), Spanish football coach
