= Nancy Johnstone (writer) =

British author and hotelier

Nancy Joan Johnstone (née Thomas-Peter; 1906–1951) was an English writer, hotelier and humanitarian. Her first husband was Archie Johnstone, a journalist who defected to the Soviet Union.

== Early life ==
Johnstone was born in Bath, in 1906, to George Franklen Thomas-Peter (1882-1941) and Mary Margaret (known as Dot) Thomas-Peter (née Baldwin) (1882-1919). She was baptised at St Paul's, Bath on 18 July 1906. Her father's occupation is given as gentleman, and their address was Butt Ash, Lyncombe. Her father was an officer in the 4th Battalion, The Duke of Cornwall's Light Infantry in World War I. Her mother died in 1919, from a bee sting. Her father remarried, in 1923, to Agnes Priestley Pearman (1900-1949).

In her childhood she lived at Oak Cottage in Perranarworthal, near Falmouth, Cornwall.

She married the journalist Archie Johnstone (1896-1963) in 1931. In 1933 the Johnstones lived at 8 Tudor Mansions, Gondar Gardens, Hampstead. In 1938, despite by then having lived in Spain for four years, they are registered as living at 59 Elm Park Mansions in Chelsea, as they spent three months in England in the summer of 1938.

== Tossa de Mar ==
In 1934, the Johnstones moved to the Costa Brava. Archie chose the destination on the basis that he did not know anyone who had been there before. Nancy had convinced Archie to resign his job as a sub-editor on the News Chronicle, and to build a hotel. On arrival in Tossa de Mar, they found a thriving artistic community, including the German architect Fritz Marcus, who they asked to design their hotel, as well as the artists Marc Chagall, Oskar Zügel and Dora Maar. The hotel was called the Casa Johnstone, and opened in 1935. When the Spanish Civil War broke out the following year, the Royal Navy destroyer HMS Hunter appeared in the bay to rescue British residents. The Johnstones refused to leave. Archie did some occasional war reporting for the News Chronicle.

Nancy obtained some income in this period by writing two memoirs: Hotel in Spain (1937) and Hotel in Flight (1939), both published by Faber & Faber and recently republished by The Clapton Press. The first book was handed to Faber by the Independent Labour Party MP John McGovern who was on a fact-finding visit to Barcelona to investigate the circumstances behind the disappearance of Andrés Nin, one of the founders of POUM, the Workers' Party of Marxist Unification. The second book covered the end of the Civil War, as the hotel became home to 50 refugee children. The day before Tossa fell to the Nationalists, the Johnstones piled 70 children into a truck, and drove them to safety in France, being chased throughout by Francisco Franco's troops. Until the border with France opened, the Johnstones and the children spent three days in the Edison Theatre in the Republican stronghold of Figueres. The day after the opening of the border to refugees, the theatre was bombed. Once across the border, the children were interned in a French concentration camp, but they were eventually all returned to their families. The Johnstones then went to Provence, and then to Paris. They made plans to travel to Mexico, and sailed on the German ship Iberia from Cherbourg to Veracruz.

== Mexico ==
Mexico was an obvious choice, as the Spanish Republican government in exile and many Spanish Republicans settled there in 1940 after the fall of France. In Mexico the Johnstones settled in Cuernavaca. Archie taught in an English School; Nancy wrote another travel memoir, Sombreros are Becoming (1941) and a novel, Temperate Zone (1941) set in Mexico. Both were published by Faber.

After a time, the Johnstones separated, Archie returning to the UK and working again for the News Chronicle. He then worked for the British Embassy in Moscow editing the British Ally publication, until defecting to the Soviet Union in 1949.

== Last years ==
Johnstone returned to Tossa in 1947 and again in 1951 but, dismayed by Franco's Spain, sold the hotel, and went to live in Guatemala. By then she had married for a second time, to a Frenchman, Fernand Caron. In Cuernavaca Johnstone had become friends with the exiled Constancia de la Mora, who had been appointed Head of the Spanish Republic's Foreign Press Office in 1938, and who was also the wife of Hidalgo de Cisneros, the Commander of the Republican air force. De la Mora visited Johnstone in Guatemala in 1950. On 26 January the two women were involved in a car accident, which killed de la Mora and badly injured Johnstone. Although she survived, there is only one further reference to her: a letter she wrote to her publishers in 1951. In summer 1951 Johnstone wrote from Tossa to Faber & Faber with a forwarding address with her aunt, Miss Edith Thomas-Peter, in Bath. She then disappears from history.

== Legacy ==
The Casa Johnstone still exists, although it now forms part of a larger hotel complex, the Hotel Don Juan.

Johnstone was forgotten until the exhibition and the book from Glòria Bosch and Susanna Portell, "Berlín> Londres> Paris> Tossa... La tranquil.litat perduda" (2007, Fundación La Caixa), with documentation, photos and letters. After, Miquel Berga, an academic at the Pompeu Fabra University in Barcelona translated the two hotel books into Catalan (a single volume, entitled Un Hotel a la Costa, published in 2011).

In 2018, it was announced that the Catalan film producer Isona Passola was to make a film about the Johnstones' time in Tossa.
