= Archie Johnstone =

Defector to the Soviet Union

Archibald Russell Johnstone (known as Archie Johnstone) (18 September 1896 – 9 September 1963) was a Scottish journalist, hotelier and humanitarian, who defected to the Soviet Union. His first wife was the English writer Nancy Johnstone.

== Early life ==
Johnstone was born in Fraserburgh in 1896, to John Johnstone, variously a miner drawer, auctioneer and journalist, and his wife Catherine (known as Kate) Jamieson. He worked initially in Aberdeen, for the Daily Journal and the Evening Express.

In WWI Johnstone was a sapper in the Royal Engineers, joining in 1915, and serving until 1919. On joining in 1915 he is described as a junior reporter. He was awarded the Victory Medal and the British War Medal. From 1921 to 1926 he lived at 50 Palatine Road, Northenden, Cheshire (now Greater Manchester), whilst working for the Daily Sketch.

In 1927 he moved to London, living initially in the Hampden Residential Club in Somers Town. He married the writer Nancy Johnstone (née Thomas-Peter) (1906-after 1951) in 1931. In 1933 the Johnstones lived at 8 Tudor Mansions, Gondar Gardens, Hampstead. In 1938, despite by then having lived in Spain for four years, they are registered as living at 59 Elm Park Mansions in Chelsea, as they spent three months in England in the summer of 1938.

== Tossa de Mar ==
In 1934, the Johnstones moved to the Costa Brava. Archie chose the destination on the basis that he did not know anyone who had been there before. Nancy had convinced Archie to resign his job as a sub-editor on the News Chronicle, and to build a hotel. On arrival in Tossa de Mar, they found a thriving artistic community, including the German architect Fritz Marcus, who they asked to design their hotel, as well as the artists Marc Chagall, Oskar Zügel and Dora Maar. The hotel was called the Casa Johnstone, and opened in 1935. When the Spanish Civil War broke out the following year, the Royal Navy destroyer HMS Hunter appeared in the bay to rescue British residents. The Johnstones refused to leave. Archie did some occasional war reporting for the News Chronicle.

Nancy obtained some income in this period by writing two books: Hotel in Spain (1937) and Hotel in Flight (1939), both published by Faber & Faber and recently republished by The Clapton Press. The first book was handed to Faber by the Independent Labour Party MP John McGovern who was on a fact-finding visit to Barcelona to investigate the circumstances behind the disappearance of Andrés Nin, one of the founders of POUM, the Workers' Party of Marxist Unification. The second book covered the end of the Civil War, as the hotel became home to 50 refugee children. The day before Tossa fell to the Nationalists, the Johnstones piled 70 children into a truck, and drove them to safety in France, being chased throughout by Franco's troops. Until the border with France opened, the Johnstones and the children spent three days in the Edison Theatre in the Republican stronghold of Figueres. The day after the opening of the border to refugees, the theatre was bombed. The children were all successfully returned to their families. They then went to Provence, and then to Paris. They made plans to travel to Mexico, and sailed on the German ship Iberia from Cherbourg to Veracruz.

== Mexico ==
Mexico was an obvious choice, as the Spanish Republican government in exile and many Spanish Republicans settled there in 1940 after the fall of France. In Mexico the Johnstones settled in Cuernavaca. Archie taught in an English School; Nancy wrote another travel memoir, Sombreros are Becoming (1941) and a novel, Temperate Zone (1941) set in Mexico. Both were published by Faber & Faber.

After a time, the Johnstones separated, Archie returning to the UK and working again for the News Chronicle. Nancy returned to Tossa in 1947 and again in 1951 but, dismayed by Franco's Spain, sold the hotel, and went to live in Guatemala. By then she had married for a second time, to a Frenchman, Fernand Caron. In Cuernavaca Nancy had become friends with the exiled Constancia de la Mora, the wife of Hidalgo de Cisneros, the Commander of the Republican air force. De la Mora visited Nancy in Guatemala in 1950. On 26 January the two women were involved in a car accident, which killed De la Mora and badly injured Nancy. Although she survived, there is only one further reference to her, in 1951, after which she disappears from history.

== Moscow ==
Johnstone went to the British Embassy in Moscow in 1947 to edit the weekly newspaper British Ally, before defecting to the Soviet Union in 1949. His defection was by way of a letter published in Pravda. In that letter, he asserted that "It was the Atlantic Pact which gave me the final impetus to make my decision. This Pact is, in effect, a war bloc of imperialist Powers, headed by the U.S. and Britain." The year after his defection, and in part because of it, the newspaper closed.

He wrote two books, both strongly ideological. The first was In the name of peace (1952), published by the Foreign Languages Publishing House. In this he wrote about his experience in WWI, and then WWII and Moscow, but skipped the period in Spain and Mexico and omitted any mention of Nancy. Although he mentions a second, Russian wife, she is unnamed. He also wrote Ivan the Not-So-Terrible: On life in the USSR (1956), published by the British-Soviet Friendship Society. Johnstone died in 1963 in Moscow, aged 66. His address at death was Flat 20 Pushkin Street, 21 Moscow. The National Probate Calendar records the 'confirmation of Helen McLeod (or MacLeod) Johnstone or Ogilvie'. This Helen is his sister, who was born 1891.

It is sometimes said that he died in 1978. This is a misunderstanding, based on a report, in 1978, of a conversation with Johnstone before he died.

He is buried in Novodevichy Cemetery.

== Legacy ==
Johnstone's defection caused considerable comment at the time, including a debate in Parliament and the closure of the newspaper. With the passage of time, however, there is little publicly available about this episode.

The Casa Johnstone still exists, although it now forms part of a larger hotel complex, the Hotel Don Juan.

In 2018 it was announced that the Catalan film producer Isona Passola was to make a film about the Johnstones' time in Tossa.
