= In Place of Splendor =

1939 literary account by Constancia de la Mora

- 1st edition page cover of In Place of Splendor (1939).
- Author: Constancia de la Mora
- Language: English
- Genre: Autobiography
- Publisher: Harcourt, Brace and Company
- Publication date: 1939
- Publication place: United States
- Pages: 433

In Place of Splendor is an autobiographical account by the Spanish republican Constancia de la Mora in which she describes her life from her birth into an aristocratic Spanish family to her exile in the United States. It was published in 1939 in English as In Place of Splendor: The Autobiography of a Spanish Woman and in 1944 in Spanish in Mexico as Doble esplendor: Autobiografía de una mujer española.

== Context ==
These memoirs form part of the women's autobiographies written in exile which have been called ‘Memoirs of combat’ as they reflect the experiences of the Second Republic and the Spanish Civil War. In this case, there is also El único camino. Memorias de la Pasionaria (1979) by Dolores Ibárruri, Mis primeros años (1987) by Federica Montseny and Cuatro años en París (1947) by Victoria Kent.

Also in this context are Isabel Oyarzábal's memoirs, Rescoldos de la libertad, first published in English under the title Smouldering Freedom. The Story of the Spanish Republicans in Exile (1945) and later translated into Spanish. However, Oyarzábal's account is presented in an objective and scholarly tone, as she makes numerous references to foreign texts. Moreover, most of the events she recounts are not the author's own experiences, but are taken from numerous oral or written accounts. Chronologically, Oyarzábal's work completes Constancia de la Mora's account of the life of the Spanish republicans, since In Place of Splendor ends in the early days of exile in the United States and Rescoldos de libertad begins with the arrival of the exiles in Mexico.

== Overview ==
In Place of Splendor shows the personal and political evolution of the author who defied the social gender model to which she was destined by birth. She managed to free herself from a failed conventional marriage, obtained one of the first legal divorces in Spain and gained gainful employment. During the civil war, both she and her second husband, Ignacio Hidalgo de Cisneros, head of the Republican Air Force, joined the Communist Party of Spain (PCE). Constancia worked in the office of government propaganda and censorship, which later became an under-secretariat under the Ministry of State when the government moved from Valencia to Barcelona.

The author divided her autobiography into chapters relating her life to political events. Thus, under the title Childhood in Old Spain and Marriage: The Life of the Spanish Woman, she talks about the monarchy of Alfonso XIII and the dictatorships of Primo de Rivera and Dámaso Berenguer. Spanish Awakening corresponds to the Second Republic and Widows of Heroes Rather than Wives of Cowards and Viva la República! constitute the fourth chapter and the epilogue.

His vision is conditioned by his militancy in the PCE, as can be seen in his harsh criticism of Largo Caballero, the entry into government in 1936 of the anarchist ministers and the May Days of 1937.

== Purpose ==
De la Mora arrived in New York City in March 1939 with the purpose of requesting aid for the almost defeated Spanish Republic. Convinced that the neutrality of the Western powers, which Germany and Italy had not complied with, had allowed the rebel side to win, he wanted to move American public opinion and make it change its neutral position in favour of humanitarian action. However, while he was working on his book, he received the news of Colonel Casado's capitulation and Franco's entry into Madrid. From that moment on, De la Mora focused on denouncing the inhumane treatment of refugees in France and the political reprisals suffered by the defeated who remained inside Spain.

== Editions ==
The first edition of the book (1939) was published in the United States in English under the title In Place of Splendor: The Autobiography of a Spanish Woman. Constancia de la Mora's education in England meant that she spoke good English, having spent a long period at Cambridge. However, several researchers claim that she was assisted in writing the book by an American journalist, Ruth McKenney.

When De la Mora settled in Mexico, he wrote the Spanish version of the book (Doble esplendor), which was published in 1944 in Mexico. He removed anecdotes and explanations and added context. Translations were also made into French, German, Italian, Czech, Romanian and Russian, but the work had minimal circulation in Spain. It was not until 1977 that the first Spanish edition was published. In 2004, a new edition was published in Spain, with a prologue by Jorge Semprún Maura.

There are differences in the wording and information presented between the English and Spanish editions. By translating into Spanish, his mother tongue, he had the opportunity to refine the initial text, which had been rushed and collective, although he still identified with it to a large extent. Although the story was already written and he could not change what had been told, he did present it in a different way.

== Reception ==
The book was a great success in the United States, being recommended by The New York Times in its "Christmas Books" list of 1939. In 1940 it reached its fifth printing. In 1941, Edward Chodorov, brother of the playwright Jerome Chodorov, began adapting Constancia de la Mora's memoirs for the theatre, and screenwriter Richard Collins wanted to turn them into a film. Neither of these projects came to fruition.
