= Alive (2026 film) =

- Theatrical release poster
- Catalan: Viva
- Directed by: Aina Clotet
- Written by: Aina Clotet; Valentina Viso
- Produced by: Edmon Roch; Jan Andreu; Marc Clotet; Aina Clotet; Marta Baldó
- Starring: Aina Clotet; Marc Soler; Naby Dakhli; Lloll Bertran; Zaida Pérez; Guillermo Toledo; Josh Zuckerman
- Cinematography: Nilo Zimmermann
- Edited by: Aina Calleja
- Music by: Clara Aguilar
- Production companies: Ikiru Films; Funicular Films; La Terraza Films
- Distributed by: Caramel Films
- Release dates: 14 May 2026 (Cannes); 19 June 2026 (Spain)
- Running time: 113 minutes
- Country: Spain
- Languages: Catalan; Spanish

Alive (Catalan: Viva) is a 2026 Spanish drama film directed by Aina Clotet (in her directorial debut feature), co-written with Valentina Viso. Clotet also stars along with Marc Soler and Naby Dakhli.

The film had its world premiere in the Critics' Week parallel section of the 79th Cannes Film Festival on 14 May 2026, where Clotet won the section's Rising Star Award and competed for the Caméra d'Or. It was released theatrically in Spain by Caramel Films on 19 June 2026.

== Plot ==
Set in a near future Catalonia where persistent droughts, mental health deterioration, and promises of life extension are concerns setting up the political agenda, the plot follows 40-year-old woman Nora, who feels the urge to live intensely after overcoming breast cancer and meeting a younger man.

== Cast ==
- Aina Clotet as Nora
- Marc Soler as Max
- Naby Dakhli as Tom
- Lloll Bertran
- Zaida Pérez
- Guillermo Toledo as Víctor
- Josh Zuckerman as Mike
- Laura Conejero as Doctora Paredes

== Production ==
Developed under the title Oh, Nora!, the film was produced by Ikiru Films and Funicular Films and it had the participation of 3Cat, and Movistar Plus+ and backing from ICAA and ICEC. Shooting locations included Badalona, Barcelona, El Garraf, Arenys de Munt, and San Francisco.

== Release ==
Alive had its world premiere in the Critics' Week parallel section of the 2026 Cannes Film Festival on 14 May. Caramel Films secured Spanish distribution. The film's Spanish commercial release is scheduled for 19 June 2026.

== Reception ==
On the American review aggregator Rotten Tomatoes, the film holds an approval rating of 50% based on 10 reviews, with an average rating of 6.2/10.

Jay Weissberg of Variety found the portrayal of the "vulnerability regarding [Nora's] altered body" to be the film's strongest suit, but thought lesser about the "unremarkably derivative" rest of situations she gets into.

Boyd van Hoeij of ScreenDaily considered that Clotet offers "a vanity-free and finely calibrated portrayal of a woman in freefall".

Javier Ocaña of El País deemed the film to be an intrepid extravagance, casting doubt about whether the unexpected turns "are brilliant enough to completely cover up some moments that border on the whacky".

Philipp Engel of Cinemanía rated the film 4 out of 5 stars, welcoming Clotet for both taking on an anti-cancer dramedy in which she breaks down taboos, a well as delivering a performance where she gives it all.

Manu Yáñez of Fotogramas rated the film 4 out of 5 stars, declaring it "a strange and unpredictable adventure", "comical and caustic, exhausting, and, in its own way, uplifting".

Manuel J. Lombardo of Diario de Sevilla gave the film a 3-star rating, billing it as "radically feminine and smartly feminist" also considering that it is "very well shot and acted".

== Awards ==
Year	Award	Category	Nominee(s)	Result	Ref.
2026	2026 Cannes Film Festival	Louis Roederer Foundation Rising Star Award (Critics' Week)	Aina Clotet	Won	

== See also ==
- List of Spanish films of 2026
