= Aina Clotet =

Spanish actress (born 1982)

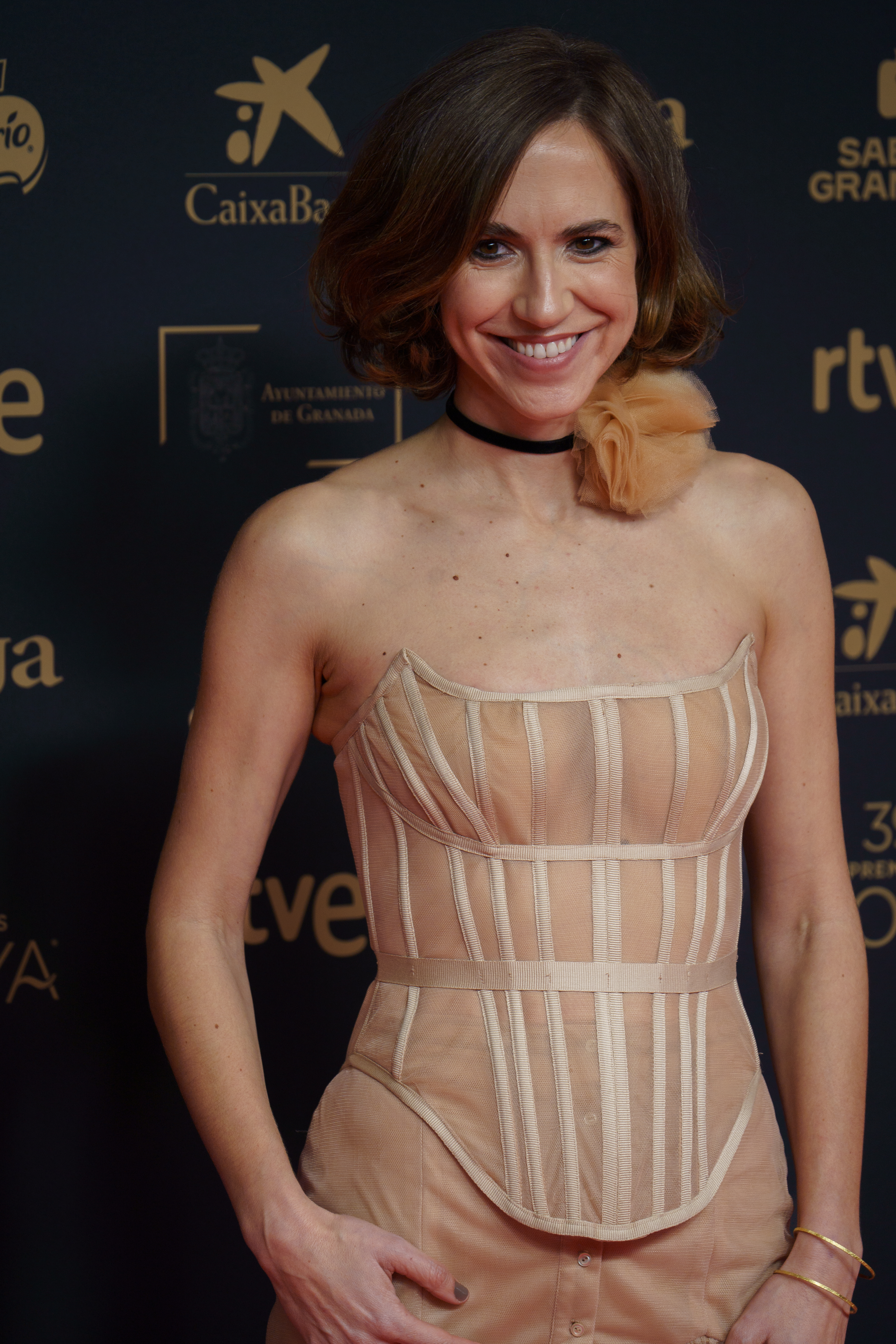
- Clotet in 2025
- Born: Aina Clotet Fresquet; 23 September 1982 (age 43); Barcelona, Catalonia, Spain
- Occupations: Actress and director
- Years active: 1994–present
- Father: Bonaventura Clotet
- Relatives: Marc Clotet (brother)

Aina Clotet Fresquet (born 23 September 1982) is a Catalan actress and director known mainly for her participation in numerous series of the Catalan channel TV3 among which Estació d'enllaç and Infidels stand out. In 2015 she made her directorial debut with her first short film Tiger, which was nominated for a Gaudí award. For her feature film directorial debut, she directed Alive (2026).

== Biography ==
Aina Clotet is a Catalan actress in film, theater and television, in this medium mainly in productions of the Catalan television channel TV3. She has a degree in Audiovisual Communication from the Pompeu Fabra University and began a degree in Art History, but did not finish it. She also studied acting at the Nancy Tuñón School in Barcelona.

She made her debut on the small screen in 1994, when she was only eleven years old, in the TV3 fiction Estació d'enllaç. Later she participated in other productions of the Catalan autonomous channel such as Temps de silenci, Mirall Trencat or Des del balcó. She made her film debut in Anita Takes a Chance.

In 2005 she participated in three episodes of the series Hospital Central, broadcast on Telecinco. In 2006 she joined the long-running TV3 series El cor de la ciutat, where she played Mònica during the seventh season of the series. In 2009 she got the role of Arlet for the TV3 series Infidels. Clotet starred in all three seasons of the series alongside actresses such as Íngrid Rubio, Montse Germán, Sílvia Bel, Dolo Beltrán and Montse Guallar.

In 2010 she starred in the film Elisa K, a drama about the rape of a minor directed by Judith Colell y Jordi Channel. The film, based on a book by author Lolita Bosch, was presented at the San Sebastian Film Festival and received good reviews. In 2011 she was part of the cast of the film El género femenino, a melodrama directed by Carlos Benparr. She was also nominated for best leading actress in the third edition of the Gaudí Awards.

Since 2008 she starred in the play Germanes (Sisters) at the Villarroel theater in Barcelona. It is a comedy written and directed by Carol López in which she shared the leading role with María Lanau and Montse Germán among others. The play received positive reviews, both from the public -it ran for four years- and from the critics -it received several Butaca and Max awards. In 2012 she starred in the film adaptation of the play, which was broadcast on TV3 in January 2012.

In 2012, she participated in the French comedy Les infidèles in a supporting role. She was also part of the cast of the film Los niños salvajes, where she played Júlia. It is a work by director and screenwriter Patricia Ferreira starring Àlex Monner, Marina Comas and Francesc Orella among others. The film received several awards, such as the Silver Biznaga for best film at thel Málaga Film Festival. Clotet received the Silver Biznaga for best supporting actress at the Malaga Film Festival and a nomination for best supporting actress at the fifth edition of the Gaudí Awards.

Also that year she premiered, as the protagonist, the new TV3 comedy Gran Nord, along with Nacho Fresneda and Roger Coma. In it Clotet plays the agent Anna Obach, a police officer who is assigned to a small and peculiar town located in the Pyrenees.

In 2013 she premiered the second and last season of Gran Nord. She also starred in the TV movie Et dec una nit de divendres, directed by Dimas Rodríguez; and participated in an episode of the mini-series Salaó, also broadcast on TV3.

In November 2014 she starred in the film Rastros de sándalo, shot in Catalan, English and Hindi. It is a film directed by Catalan Maria Ripoll. Clotet played Paula, a girl who was adopted as a child and separated from her sister Mina, played by Indian actress Nandita Das. Clotet was nominated for best leading actress at the seventh edition of the Gaudí Awards for this work.

In 2015 she was part of the choral cast of the film Barcelona, noche de invierno, the second part of the romantic comedy Barcelona, noche de verano, directed by Dani de la Orden. Clotet, played Sílvia, a delivery woman who shares a night with Ángel (Artur Busquets) and Ádrian (Cristian Valencia). For this performance she was nominated for Best Supporting Actress at the eighth edition of the Gaudí Awards.

In 2015 she shot her first short film as a director: Tiger. It stars herself and the actor Marcel Borràs; it also features the participation of actors and actresses such as Maria Lanau, Vicenç Fonolleda and Paula Hernández. The short film was presented in 2016 at Málaga Film Festival and received a nomination for best short film at the ninth edition of the Gaudí Awards. In theater, she premiered on February 11, 2015 the play Joc de miralls, an adaptation of the American playwright Annie Baker.

In 2017 she joined the Movistar+ series Velvet Colección, as a supporting actress, in which she played the role of Roser Godó, daughter of the Catalan businessman Eduard Godó and his wife Macarena Rey, played by Imanol Arias and Adriana Ozores. Also that year, she participated in the filming of the movie 7 razones para huir.

In 2018 it was announced that she would be part of the cast of the Movistar+ Miniseries Matar al padre, directed by the Catalan Mar Coll. Also that year she starred for a month in the play El sistema solar, at the Teatre Lliure in Barcelona, directed by Carol López and in which she shares the stage with Nausicaa Bonnín, Marc Clotet and Guillermo Toledo. In November 2018, the film Durante la tormenta, directed by Oriol Paulo, and in which Clotet has a supporting role, was released.

Also in November 2018 she denounced in a statement via Twitter that Leticia Dolera fired her from the series Vida perfecta that she was preparing for Movistar+ because she was pregnant, pointing out that she was telling her case so that her pregnant colleagues "do not suffer the same legal unprotection" as her. Clotet also indicated that with an adapted planning she could have shot most of the scenes, resorting to different techniques to disguise her pregnancy, and that she offered her salary to cover any additional costs that the pregnancy could have entailed for the production.

Her directorial debut feature Alive was selected for screening in the Critics' Week parallel section of the 2026 Cannes Film Festival.

== Filmography ==
=== Cinema ===
Year	Title	Character	Director
2001	Anita no pierde el tren	Anita joven	Ventura Pons
2004	Mala Uva	Mari	Javier Domingo
2004	Jóvenes	Cristina	Carles Torras, Ramon Térmens
2004	Reprimidos	Sandra	Ignacio Delgado Zambrano
2006	53 días de invierno	Valeria	Judith Colell
2006	Animales Heridos	Hija	Ventura Pons
2010	Elisa K	Elisa	Jordi Channel, Judith Colell
2011	El gènere femení	Júlia	Carlos Benpar
2012	Los niños salvajes	Júlia	Patricia Ferreira
2012	Les infidèles	Julia	Michel Hazanavicius
2013	Et dec una nit de divendres	Laura	Dimas Rodríguez
2014	Rastros de sándalo	Paula/Sita	María Ripoll
2014	Difuminado	Valentina	Pere Koniec
2015	Barcelona, noche de invierno	Sílvia	Dani de la Orden
2018	Durante la tormenta	Úrsula Abad	Oriol Paulo
2019	7 razones para huir	Progress: The Woman	Esteve Soler, Gerard Quinto and David Torras
2019	La hija de alguien	Elisabet	Marcel Alcántara
2019	Vivir dos veces	Camarera	María Ripoll
2023	Els encantats	Íngrid	
2024	Un lugar común	Carmela	
2026	Viva	Nora	

2023 burning body wife of the murdered

=== Theater ===
Year	Title	Character	Role
2002	Toda una señora		Montserrat Cornet
2003	Geloses		Teresa Devant
2005	Las señoritas de Siam		Ever Martín Blanchet
2005	Algo		Alex Mañas
2006	Borges y Sábato		Carles Canut
2007	Sonetos		Jordi Prat i Coll
2008	Germanes	Ivonne	Carol López
2010	Escenas de un matrimonio	Karin	Marta Angelat
2013	Ex-change		Marta Gené Camos
2015	Joc de miralls	Teresa	Juan Carlos Martel
2018	El sistema solar	Edurne	Carol López

=== Television ===
Year	Title	Character	Channel	Director	Role
1994-1999	Estació d´enllaç	Laura Valls Canales	TV3	—	126 episodes
2001-2002	Des del balcó	Patrícia	TV3	—	6 episodes
2001	Temps de silenci	Maria Mercè Mascarell	TV3	—	7 episodes
2002	Mirall trencat	Criada	TV3	—	1 episode
2005	Sprint Especial	Edurne	TV3	Juan Carlos Claver	Telefilme
2005	Hospital Central	Lydia	Telecinco	—	3 episodes
2006-2007	El cor de la ciutat	Mònica	TV3	—	41 episodes
2007	Positius	Belén	TV3	Judith Colell	Telefilme
2009-2011	Infidels	Arlet Ferreres Miró	TV3	María Almagro	42 episodes
2012-2013	Gran Nord	Anna Obach	TV3	María Almagro and Jesús Font	26 episodes
2012	Germanes	Ivonne	TV3	Carol López	Telefilme
2013	Salaó	Camille	TV3	Jesús Font	Miniseries; 1 episode
2017	Velvet Colección	Roser Godó	Movistar+	Jorge Torregrossa	6 episodes
2017	El Crac	Ella misma	TV3	Joel Joan and Héctor Claramunt	1 episode
2018	Benvinguts a la familia	Lola	TV3	Pau Freixas	1 episode
2018	Matar al padre	Carla	Movistar+	Mar Coll	Miniseries; 1 episode
2019	La que se avecina	Adriana	Telecinco	Alberto Caballero and Laura Caballero	1 episode
2021	Hierro	Tamara Arias	Movistar+		6 episodes

== Personal life ==
She is the sister of actor Marc Clotet. She's the daughter of Dr. Bonaventura Clotet, a reference in the field of AIDS research. Together with her brother, she is closely linked to many fundraising events for this disease.

She is the partner of Catalan actor Marcel Borràs with whom she has two children: Juna, born in 2015, and a boy born in February 2019.

== Awards ==
- Sant Jordi Awards

Year	Category	Film	Result
2010	Mejor actriz en Film española	Elisa K	Won

- Málaga Spanish Film Festival

Year	Category	Film	Result
2012	Biznaga de Plata a la mejor actriz de reparto	Los niños salvajes (Els nens salvatges)	Won
2019	Biznaga de Plata a la mejor actriz	La filla d’algú (La hija de alguien)	Won

- Cannes Film Festival

Year	Category	Film	Result
2026	Critics' Week- Rising Star Award	Alive	Won
