= 53 Winter Days =

- Spanish: 53 días de invierno
- Directed by: Judith Colell
- Screenplay by: Gemma Ventura
- Starring: Mercedes Sampietro; Àlex Brendemühl; Aina Clotet; Sílvia Munt; Joaquim de Almeida
- Cinematography: Sergi Gallardo
- Edited by: David Gallart
- Distributed by: Filmax
- Release dates: September 2006 (Zinemaldia); 26 October 2007 (Spain)
- Country: Spain
- Language: Spanish

53 Winter Days (Spanish: 53 días de invierno) is a 2006 Spanish drama film directed by Judith Colell and written by Gemma Ventura. Starring Mercedes Sampietro, Àlex Brendemühl, and Aina Clotet, the plot follows three vignettes, respectively concerning a school teacher suffering from harassment, a security guard under economic distress, and a wannabe musician. It explores the fragility of the human spirit in a society immersed in the morality of success.

It received 9 nominations at the VI Barcelona Cinema Awards but did not win any.

== Plot ==
Three people meet one winter night at a bus stop. The three witness the abandonment of a dog. The three are: Mila, a high school teacher who has been on sick leave for a year after suffering an attack by one of her students; Celso, a married security guard, father of a son, and with serious financial problems, and about to find out that he will become a father again, this time of twins; and Valeria, a cello student, with a troubled family and romantic relationship.

The three characters embark on a drifting journey that will lead them to confront their fears and frustrations and make life-changing decisions.

== Cast ==
- Mercedes Sampietro as Mila
- Aina Clotet as Valeria
- Àlex Brendemühl as Celso
- Maria Pau Pigem as Àngela
- Montserrat Salvador as Dolores
- Sílvia Munt as Valeria's mother
- Joaquim de Almeida as Hugo

== Production ==
The film is an Ovideo production and it had the backing of TVE and TVC. Shooting began on 20 February 2006 and took place in and around Barcelona. It has been dubbed in Catalan.

== Release ==
The film was presented in the 'Zabaltegi-Nuevos Directores' section of the San Sebastián International Film Festival in 2006. It also screened at the Toulouse Spanish Film Festival. It was released theatrically in Spain on 26 October 2007.

== Reception ==
Jonathan Holland of Variety considered that the interweaving of the three stories results into an "unexpectedly resonant, understated whole" [although] the film's themes are déjà vu".

The review in El País assessed that there is "little to criticize about the film" insofar it achieves what it sets out to be, if anything, the repetition of tropes, which gives a sense of déjà vu.

== Accolades ==
52nd Sant Jordi Awards

Category	Person	Result
Best Actor in a Spanish Film	Àlex Brendemühl	Winner

Toulouse Spanish Film Festival
Best Actress Award (Aina Clotet)

Butaca Awards 2008
Best Catalan Film and Best Catalan Actress (Aina Clotet).

== See also ==
- List of Spanish films of 2007
