= Lolita Bosch =

Catalan writer

- Born: 3 July 1970 (age 56); Barcelona, Spain
- Occupation: Writer
- Writing career
- Language: Catalan, Spanish
- Notable work: Elisa Kiseljak

Lolita Bosch (born 3 July 1970) is a Catalan writer whose work includes novels, essays, and projects related to memory and social issues. She writes in both Catalan and Spanish.

== Early life and education ==
Bosch was born in Barcelona in 1970. She spent part of her childhood in the United States and later lived for several years in Mexico, an experience that influenced her literary and social interests.

== Career ==
Bosch began publishing in the early 2000s and has written novels, short stories, and essays. Her work often incorporates autobiographical elements and explores themes related to personal and collective memory.

Her novel Elisa Kiseljak was adapted into the 2010 film Elisa K, directed by Judith Colell and Jordi Cadena.

Bosch has also participated in cultural and social initiatives, particularly those addressing violence in Mexico and the preservation of public memory.

== Themes ==
Bosch’s writing frequently examines memory, trauma, and the reconstruction of identity, often drawing on testimonial forms and reflective narration. Ara highlighted her focus on the social dimensions of violence and the ethical responsibilities of storytelling. ElDiario.es noted her emphasis on literature as a space for healing and collective reflection.

== Selected works ==
- Elisa Kiseljak
- La família del meu pare
- La persona que fuimos
- Esto que ves es un rostro
- Campos de amapola antes de esto

== Adaptations ==
- Elisa K (2010), a film adaptation of Elisa Kiseljak.
