= Tossa de Mar =

- Municipality
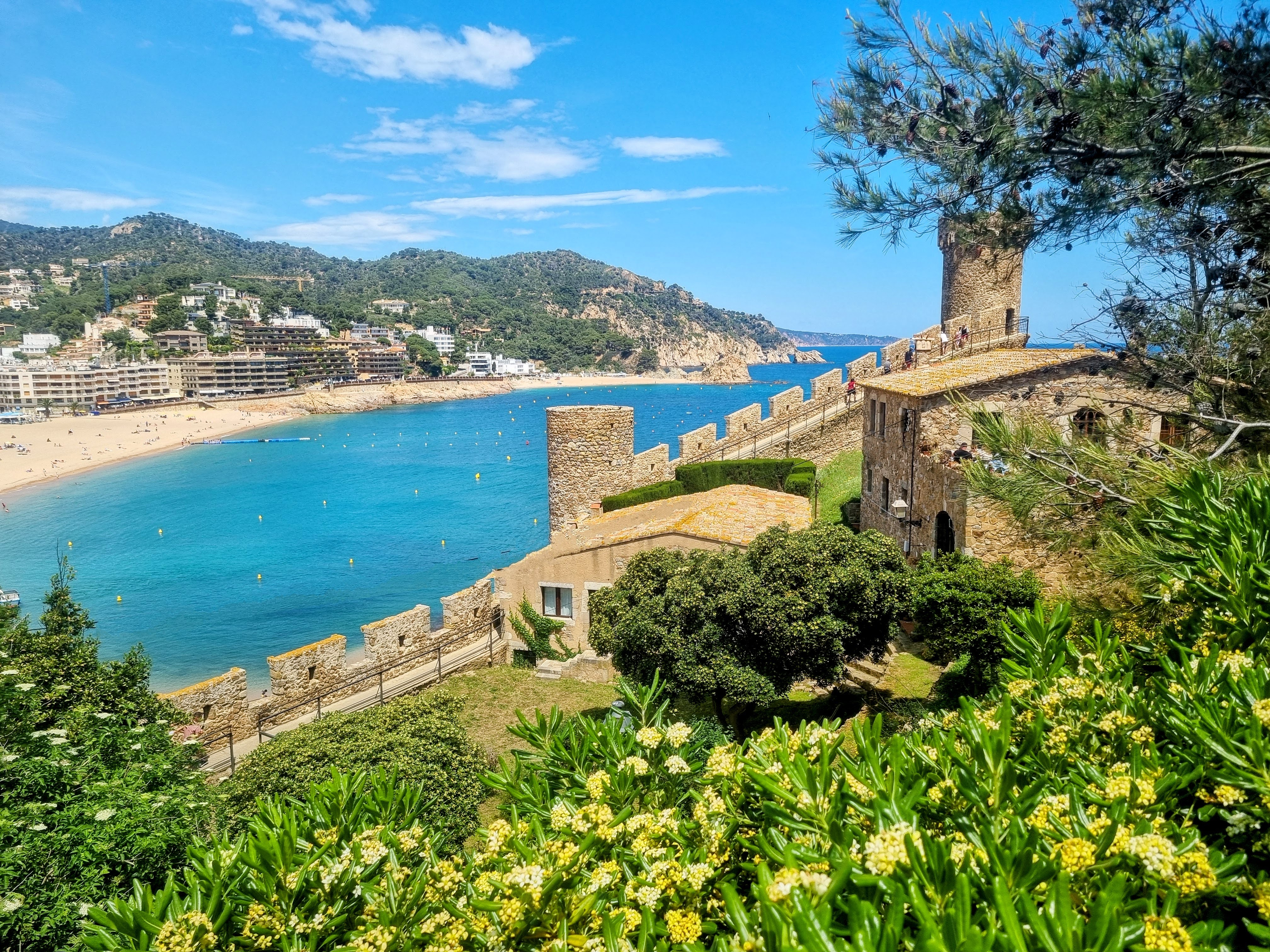

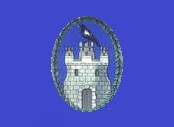
- Flag Coat of arms
- Location of Tossa de Mar
- Location within Catalonia Location within Spain
- Coordinates: 41°43′14″N 2°55′56″E
- Country: Spain
- Community: Catalonia
- Province: Girona
- Comarca: La Selva

Government
  - Mayor: Gisela Saladich Parés (2015) (Ind.)

Area
  - Total: 38.6 km^{2} (14.9 sq mi)
- Elevation: 6 m (20 ft)

Population (2025-01-01)
  - Total: 6,347
  - Density: 164/km^{2} (426/sq mi)
- Demonym: Tossenc
- Postal code: 17320
- Website: www.tossademar.cat

Tossa de Mar (Catalan: [ˈtosə ðə ˈmaɾ]; Spanish: Tosa de Mar) is a municipality in Catalonia, Spain, located on the coastal Costa Brava, about 100 kilometres north of Barcelona and 100 kilometres south of the French border. It is accessible through Girona Airport, some distance north.

The GR 92 long-distance footpath, which roughly follows the length of the Mediterranean coast of Spain, has a staging point at Tossa de Mar. Stage 10 links northwards to Sant Feliu de Guíxols, a distance of 20.2 kilometres (12.6 mi), whilst stage 11 links southwards to Lloret de Mar, a distance of 14.4 kilometres (8.9 mi).

== History ==
There is ample evidence of settlements dating back to the Neolithic period, and it is believed that the area has been continuously populated since that time. Between the 4th-1st century BC the first Iberian settlements appeared, followed shortly after by the Romans in the 1st century.

In 966, Tossa was ceded by Count Miró of Barcelona to the Abbey of Ripoll. Some two centuries later, in 1187, Tossa was granted its charter by the Abbot of Ripoll, coinciding with the building of a church atop Mount Guardí, the remnants of which can still be seen today.

Sometime in the 12th century, the medieval town was walled off and a castle was built on the highest point of Mt. Guardí, this castle was to be subsequently replaced by a windmill, and this in turn by a lighthouse which is still operational.

By the year 1500, the first houses were built extra-muros to accommodate population growth. This process was greatly accelerated during the 17th and 18th centuries, shaping an urban configuration that was to remain practically unchanged until the arrival of mass tourism in the 1950s.

In 1989, Tossa de Mar was the first place in the world to declare itself an anti-bullfighting city.

== Economy ==
Contrary to popular belief that Tossa has traditionally been a fishing town, in medieval times and until the arrival of tourism, the local economy was mostly based on agricultural production, principally grapes and cork. There was a thriving export market of the latter (in the form of cork taps shipped to the Americas) during the 18th century and early 19th century.

Fishing has traditionally been a relatively minor contributor to the village's economy, although it has consistently provided an alternative source of income in times of economic crisis. A small fishing industry is still active as of 2005 and occupies a few members of local fishing families. Most of their captures are sold to local restaurants and in the fish markets in neighbouring Blanes and Sant Feliu de Guíxols.

== Beaches ==
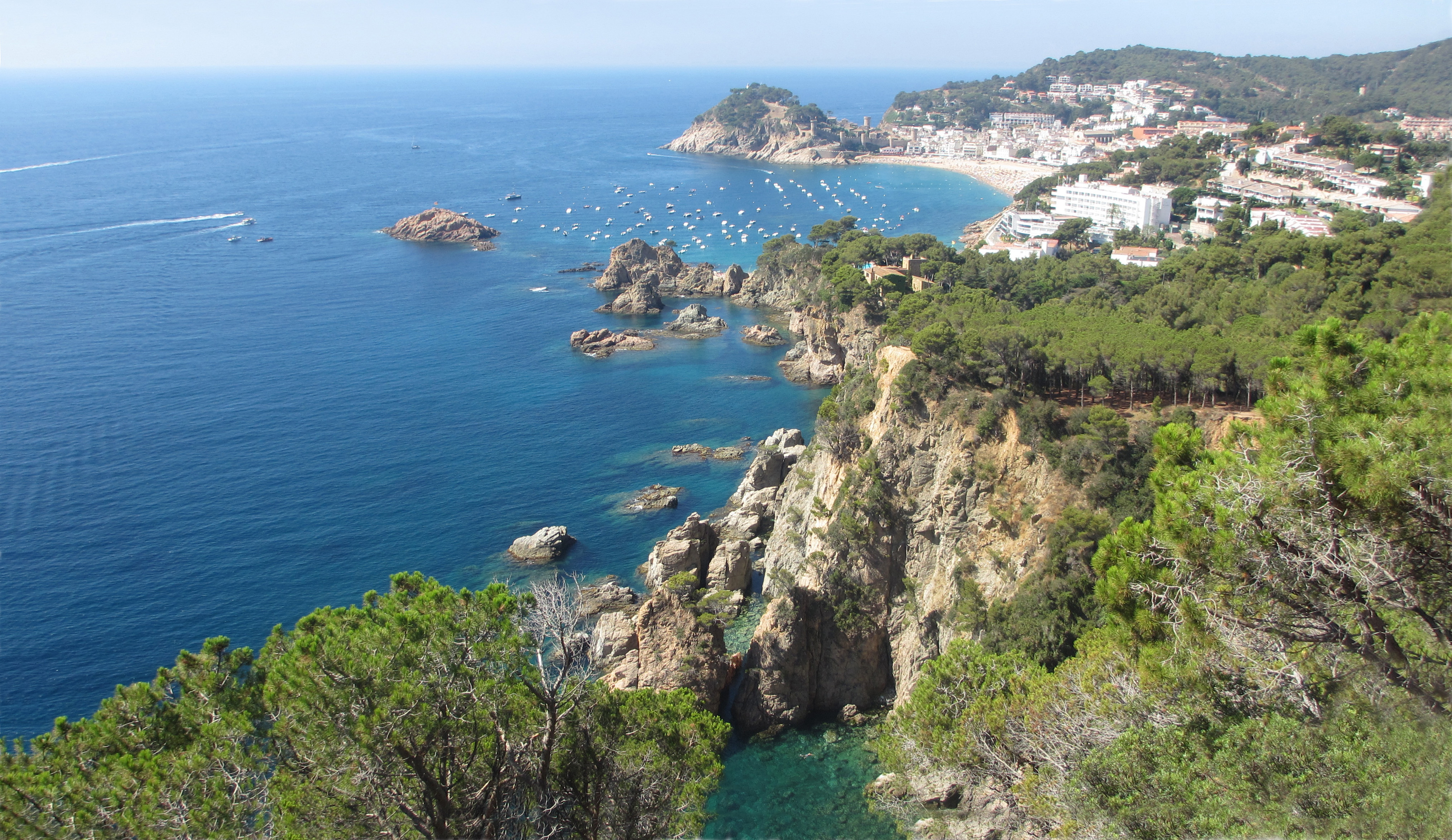
A view of Tossa de Mar from the road to Sant Feliu

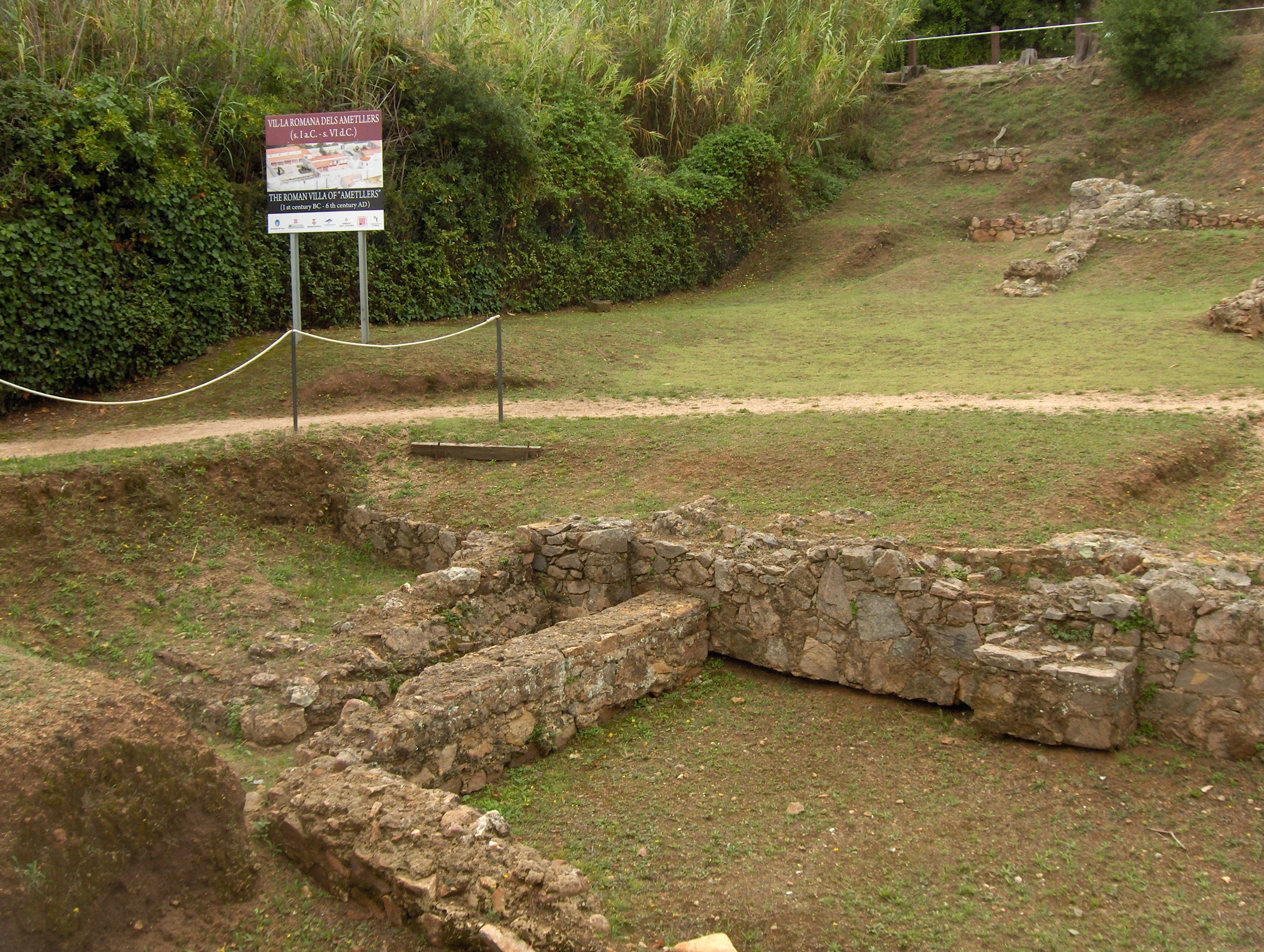
Remains of the Roman villa of the Ametllers

Tossa de Mar has three main beaches:

- The Tossa Beach (Platja Gran), in front of downtown. This beach is enclosed to the west by the medieval castle. It is 380m long and 60m wide.
- La Mar Menuda, on the other side of the bay. It has all the usual services and facilities, such as sports equipment hire. Local police patrol the area on bicycles. Dimensions of the beach: 180m long and 20m wide.
- El Codolar, behind the walls.

== The Ancient Hospital of Sant Miquel ==
This ancient hospital was founded in 1773 as a hospital for the poor. The founder, Tomás Vidal i Rey had become wealthy in America. It is a building with two floors and a central courtyard. It now houses the cultural centre of the village. At its side is the chapel of Sant Miquel with a baroque altar of some note.

== Roman villa of Ametllers ==
This rural villa (1st century BC - 6th century AD) belonged to the Roman province of Tarraconensis. It consists of two parts: the rural and the rustic. One can get an idea of its great value by looking, among other things, at the remains of the spa, the central heating system, the mosaics, and the base of a fruit press with the recipient for the crushed juices. Fragments of the mosaics, the stucco, and several elements of sculptures attest to the wealth of the owners of the villa. The ceramic vases are proof of the trade with the Mediterranean world. Farming tools, fish tackle, and loom tools reveal agricultural and fishing activities. Everyday life is evoked by other objects such as hairpins, small spoons, and bone and ivory utensils.

== Parish church ==
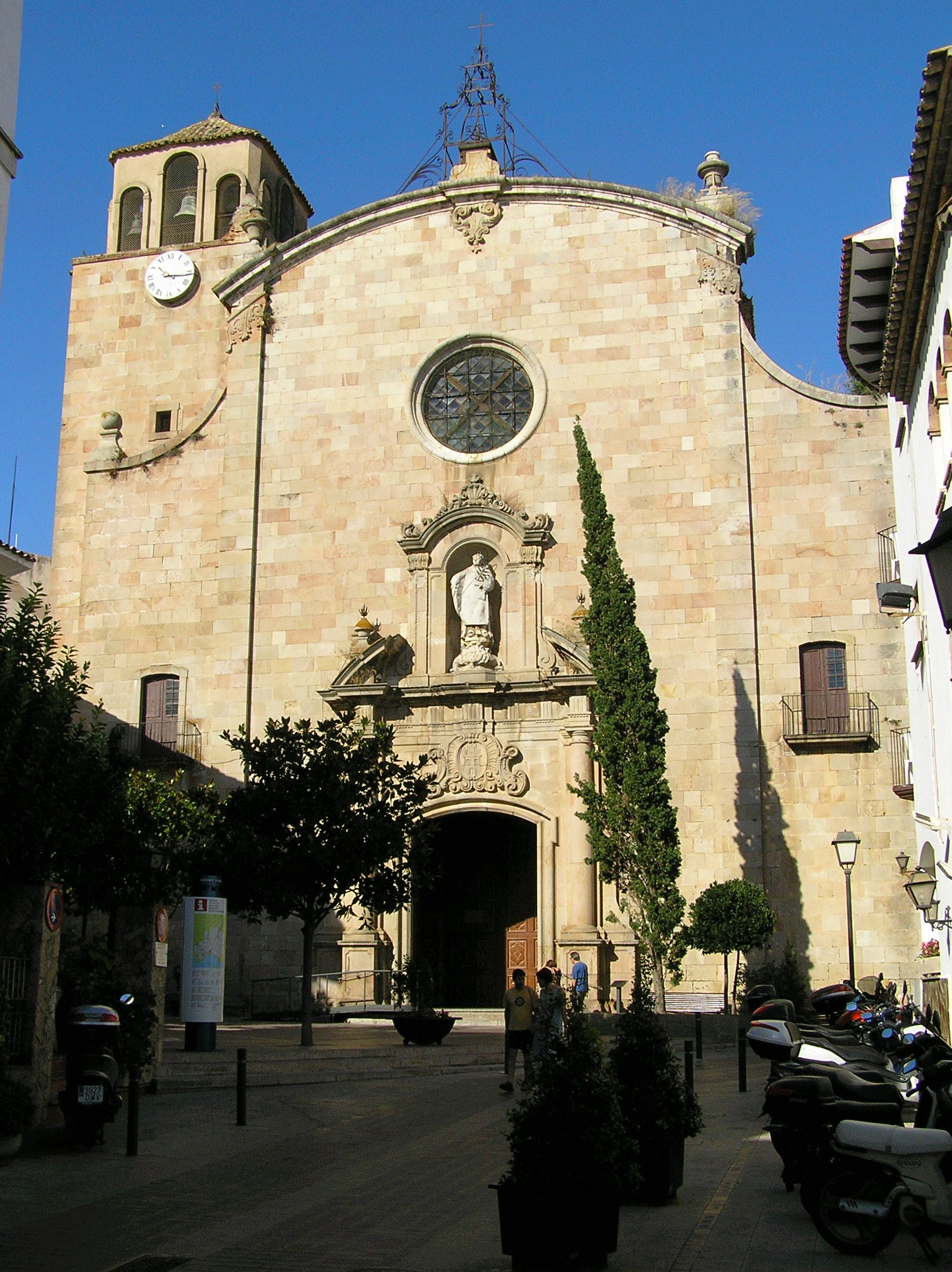
Parish church

This church, dedicated to the martyr Vincent of Saragossa, was inaugurated on 29 November 1775, after 20 years of construction. The church is one of the largest in the diocese and can, during important celebrations, host the whole population of Tossa de Mar. Much of the interior of the church was devastated during the Civil War in 1936.

Inside is the chapel of Saint Sebastian, a saint adored by the population. The devotion started in the 15th or 16th century and culminates each year on 20 January into the commemoration of "Vot del Poble" (pledge of the people). The retable of the Rosary has also survived the destruction in 1936.

== The walled-in Old Town ==
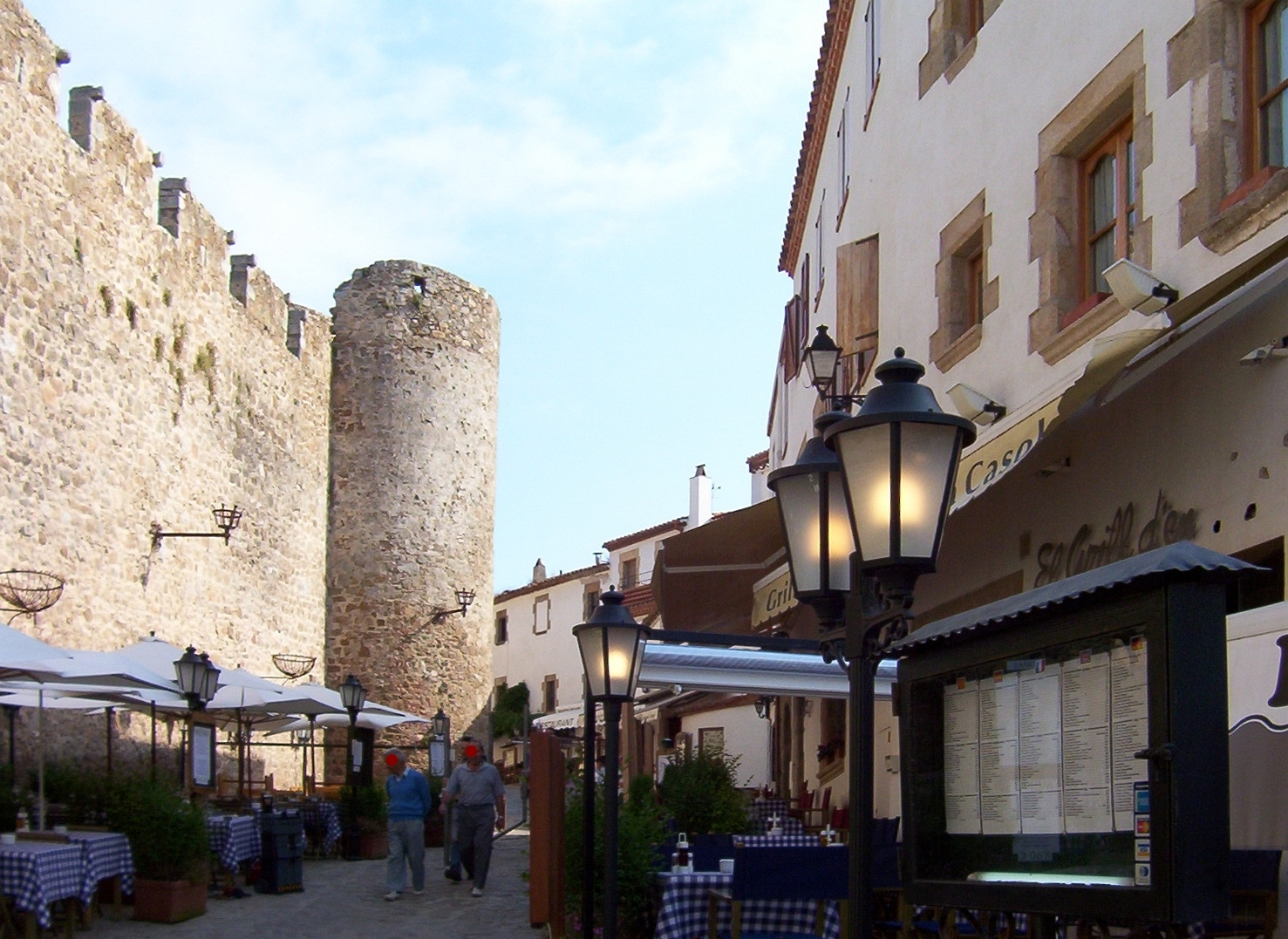
Pedestrian zone along the city wall

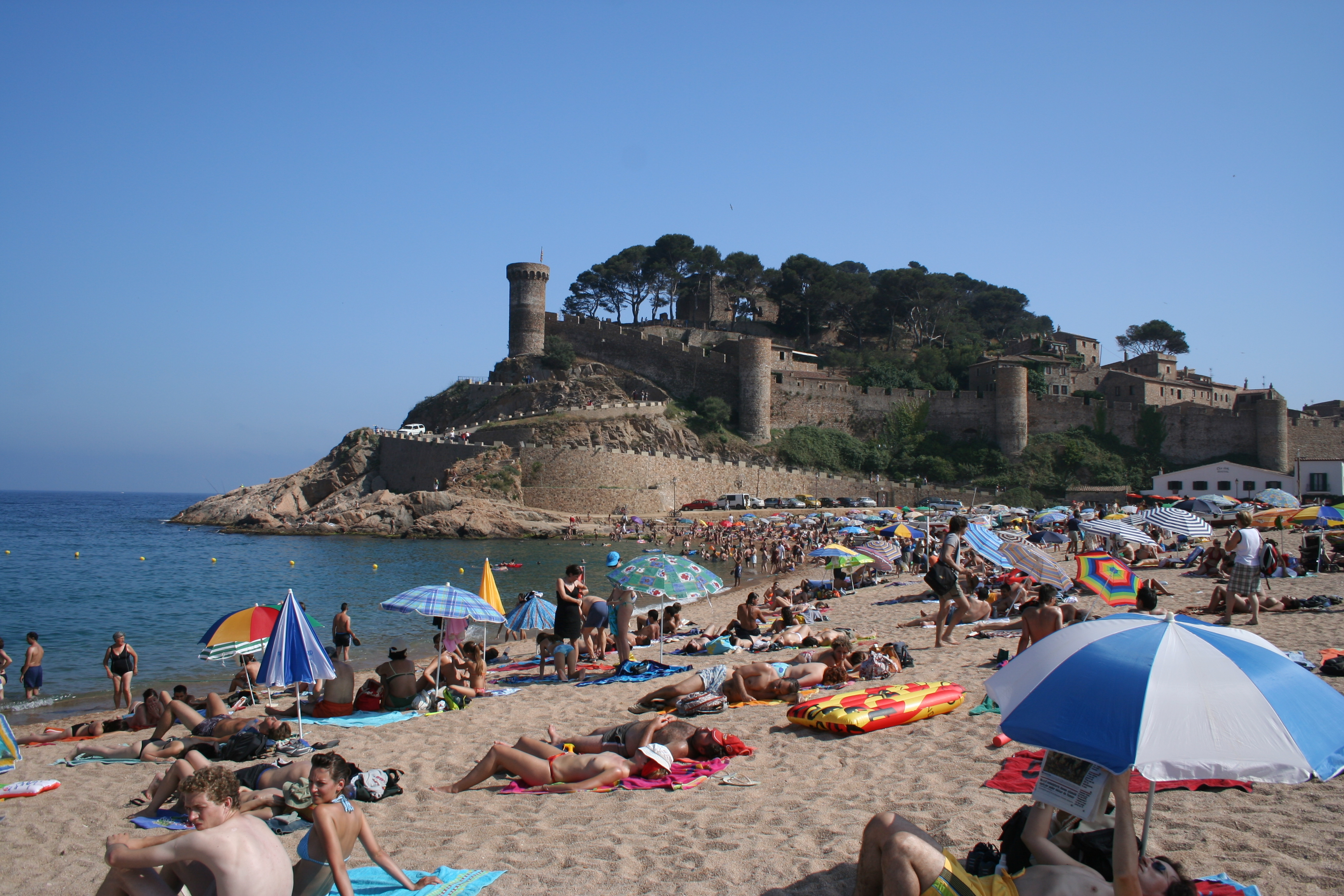
View of the Vila Vella enceinte of Tossa de Mar from the beach

The "Vila Vella enceinte" is the only example of a fortified medieval town still standing on the Catalan coast. Its present appearance dates back to the end of the 14th century. It still has the entire original perimeter with battlemented stone walls, four turrets, and three cylindrical towers with parapets. At the highest point, where the lighthouse stands today, was, until the beginning of the 19th century, the castle of the Abbot of the Monastery Santa Maria de Ripoll, the territorial Lord of the town. The site was declared a national historic monument in 1931.

The interior of the Old Town consists of narrow, cobblestoned streets, the Governor's House (now the Municipal museum), the House of Holy Cloth ("Sant Drap"), a medieval hospital, and remnants of a Romanesque church and a Gothic church.

== Municipal museum ==
The Municipal Museum, built in Late Gothic style, is situated in the Governor's House, inside the Vila Vella enceinte. It used to be the residence of the jurisdictional governors of Tossa de Mar and its environs, who ruled for the Abbots of the monastery Santa Maria de Ripoll.

The museum was opened on 1 September 1935. It houses an important collection of contemporary art with works of Spanish and foreign artists who frequented Tossa de Mar during the 1930s, such as the Celestial Violinist by Marc Chagall. The archaeological section houses artefacts dating from the Paleolithical Period to the Late Middle Ages. Of particular note are the mosaics found in the atrium of the Roman Villa of the Ametllers, dating from the end of the 4th - beginning of the 5th century.

Associated with the artists were the Scottish journalist Archie Johnstone and his Anglo-Irish writer wife Nancy Johnstone who established a hotel in the old town in 1934, the Casa Johnstone. The building still exists, although it now forms part of a larger hotel complex, the Hotel Don Juan. At the end of the Spanish Civil War, the Johnstones turned the hotel over to use by refugee children who, shortly before Tossa fell to the Nationalists, the Johnstones piled 70 children into a truck, and drove them to safety in France, being chased throughout by Franco's troops. Nancy wrote two memoirs recording their experiences in Tossa de Mar: Hotel in Spain, describing their ups and downs between 1934 and 1936, as they set up the hotel, and Hotel in Flight describing the war years, 1936-1939.
