= Elisa K =

- Directed by: Judith Colell; Jordi Cadena
- Based on: Elisa Kiseljak by Lolita Bosch
- Starring: Aina Clotet
- Release date: 21 September 2010 (SSIFF)
- Running time: 71 minutes
- Country: Spain
- Language: Catalan

Elisa K is a 2010 Spanish drama film directed by Judith Colell and Jordi Cadena. Based on the novel Elisa Kiseljak by Lolita Bosch, the film explores the long‑term psychological impact of childhood trauma.

== Plot ==
The narrative alternates between Elisa’s childhood and adulthood. At age eleven, she experiences a traumatic event that she later suppresses. Years afterward, a sudden recollection forces her to confront the emotional consequences of what happened.

== Style and themes ==
Variety noted the film’s formal structure, contrasting black‑and‑white imagery for the childhood timeline with color photography for the adult sequences. The review highlighted the film’s restrained tone and its focus on memory, trauma, and the difficulty of articulating past abuse. In El Periódico, critic Quim Casas emphasized the film’s introspective approach, describing how the directors use visual fragmentation and shifts in perspective to mirror Elisa’s fractured recollection. The article also comments on the film’s deliberate pacing and its emphasis on internal experience over external action.

== Release ==
The film screened at the 2010 San Sebastián International Film Festival.

== Reception ==
Variety praised the film’s visual ambition and the performances of the actresses portraying Elisa at different ages, noting the film’s emotional subtlety and careful handling of sensitive material.

In his review for El Periódico, Quim Casas highlighted the film’s thematic coherence and the effectiveness of its stylistic division between childhood and adulthood, describing it as a thoughtful and formally controlled adaptation.
