= Catalan Film Academy =

Non-profit organization for the promotion of the Catalan film industry

Acadèmia del Cinema Català
- Abbreviation: ACC
- Formation: February 21, 2008
- Type: Film organization
- Purpose: Promotion and development of Catalan cinema
- Headquarters: Barcelona
- Location: Passeig de Colom, 6 Barcelona
- President: Judith Colell
- Website: www.academiadelcinema.cat
- Remarks: @academiacinecat

The Catalan Film Academy (Acadèmia del Cinema Català, in Catalan) is a non-profit organization located in Barcelona created to recognize Catalan film productions and professionals, with the objective of being a voice of the Catalan film industry. The Academy joins both creative and productive branches of filmmaking, artistically and scientifically, in the same way as the other film academies. It is a member of the European Film Academy's network of national film academies.

It annually holds the Gaudí Awards.

== Presidents ==
- Joel Joan (2008–2013)
- Isona Passola (2013–2021)
- Judith Colell (since 2021)
