= Anti-bullfighting city =

City that does not support the practice of bullfighting

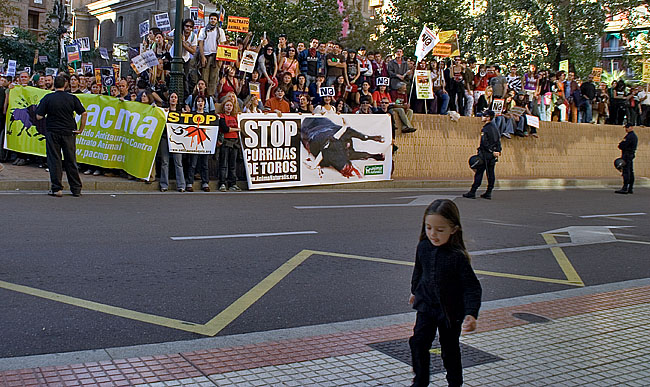
Anti-bullfighting demonstration in Zaragoza during the 2008–2014 Spanish financial crisis.

An anti-bullfighting city (Spanish: ciudad antitaurina, Catalan: ciutat antitaurina) is a city that formally adheres to a declaration of ethics and adopts municipal policies that do not support the practice of bullfighting within their borders and state that they are against the practice of bullfighting altogether.

The concept of an anti-bullfighting city is not forbidding the practice of bullfighting. For the same declaration to be adopted by local municipalities, associations and organisations that protect animals pursue their influence and pressure near the respective mayors in the sense that they declare their counties as an anti-bullfighting.

The manner of implementation of the campaigns is not necessarily equal in all countries. Each local organisation decides on the strategy that they prefer to use, always taking the different political aspects into account. One of the strategies adopted by some campaign organisations is also raising awareness among tourists who visit cities with bullfighting traditions, to exert economic pressure as a factor dissuator and penalises of bullfighting.

== History ==
The first town to adopt the concept of anti-bullfighting city was Tossa de Mar in Spain, in the Autonomous Community of Catalonia. The declaration was implemented in 1989 by then mayor, Telm Zaragoza, making it the first anti-bullfighting city in the world.

At that time, the city council was in a climate of political unrest and challenges from various entities for the protection of animals against a councilman in the region, who argued that it was necessary to promote bullfighting, because the tourists only found the tradition in the Catalan culture. This resulted in conditions that were created to initiate the movement.

The mentor of the implementation of the concept was Pilar Taberner at the time, a member of the environmentalist party "The Greens" from Spain and who has started a series of contacts for the creation of an international movement against bullfighting nine years earlier, that proposed to the then Mayor of Tossa de Mar, Telm Zaragoza to declare Tossa de Mar anti-bullfighting.

Before, in 1988, Pilar Taberner was present for the realisation of an international conference in Gijón, in the north of Spain, with the participation of entities from several countries to find a way together to combat bullfighting and where the first idea of asking the Spanish mayors to declare their cities as anti-bullfighting came up.

The same idea eventually served as the basis of the proposal for resolving the controversy of Tossa de Mar, as remembers the responsible after some 19 years after the event on the site of Anubis, an association for the protection of animals in Spain, which she belongs: "The Major, wanted to stop the scandal, and ask me how, I suggested that you declare the anti-bullfighting city."

The mayor then, just accepted the suggestion by the activist, which led to the declaration of the first city of its kind worldwide.

Pilar Taberner notes on the site of Anubis, however, that the implementation of the initiative was also influenced by the dissemination strategy led to several countries.

According to the activist, the mayor "would forget the promise if it had not reached thousands of letters of congratulation from all over the world", which became public "and it was necessary to have continuity."

With the action of Tossa de Mar, the foundation was laid for the development of the concept of anti-bullfighting city, which has spread to several other cities.

Later, over the years, several animal protection associations from different countries have adopted the concept and launched initiatives and campaigns with the aim that cities where there are bullfights apply the same concept.

The acceptance of its concept has not always been easy, requiring a great awareness among the political entities in a context with many arguments in favour of and against bullfighting activities.

== Current anti-bullfighting towns or cities ==
City	Region	Country	Date	References
Medellín	Antioquia	Colombia	February 2008	
Bello	Antioquia	Colombia	July 2008	
Zapatoca	Santander	Colombia	February 2008	
La Tebaida	Quindío	Colombia	November 2012	
Mouans-Sartoux	Alpes-Maritimes	France	December 2004	
Bully-les-Mines	Pas-de-Calais	France	December 2006	
Montignac	Dordogne	France	November 2007	
Joucou	Aude	France	July 2009	
Póvoa de Varzim	Porto	Portugal	July 2017	
Viana do Castelo	Viana do Castelo	Portugal	December 2008	
Carrizal	Miranda	Venezuela	October 2008	
Caracas	Distrito Capital	Venezuela	April 2009	
Valera	Trujillo	Venezuela	August 2011	
Concepción	Concepción, Junín	Peru	June 2012	
Junín	Junín, Junín	Peru	July 2012	
Teocelo	Veracruz	Mexico	July 2012	
Coslada	Madrid	Spain	2005	
Basauri	Basque Country	Spain	June 2008	
Castrillón	Asturias	Spain	July 2008	
Costitx	Mallorca, Balearic Islands	Spain	July 2009	
Cangas	Galicia	Spain	January 2010	
Vedra	Galicia	Spain	March 2010	
Dodro	Galicia	Spain	April 2010	
Mutxamel	Alicante, Valencian Community	Spain	April 2010	
Pobra do Brollón	Galicia	Spain	July 2010	
Teo	Galicia	Spain	July 2010	
Sestao	Basque Country	Spain	August 2010	
Ares	Galicia	Spain	July 2011	
Santurtzi	Basque Country	Spain	October 2011	
Barakaldo	Basque Country	Spain	November 2011	
Abanto y Ciérbana-Abanto Zierbena	Basque Country	Spain	November 2011	
