= Constancia de la Mora =

Spanish aristocrat who supported the republican cause during the Civil War

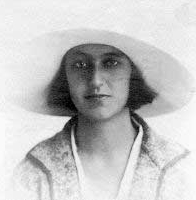
- Born: Constancia de la Mora Maura; 28 January 1906; Madrid, Kingdom of Spain
- Died: 27 January 1950 (aged 43); Guatemala
- Occupations: Author, politician
- Political party: Communist Party of Spain
- Spouse: Ignacio Hidalgo de Cisneros (div 1941)

Constancia de la Mora Maura (28 January 1906 – 27 January 1950) was a Spanish political activist, author and Republican official during the Spanish Civil War. Born into a conservative aristocratic family, she became a communist militant and directed the Foreign Press Office of the Second Spanish Republic.

Her mother was the daughter of Antonio Maura, five time Prime Minister of Spain.

Constancia married for the first time Manuel Bolín from Málaga (brother of Luis Bolín, censor of the foreign press in Franco's provisional government), with whom she had a daughter, and later with the general and Commander of the Republican Air Force, Ignacio Hidalgo de Cisneros. She was the first woman to remarry secularly in Catholic Spain.

During the Spanish Civil War she decided to join the Communist Party, and visited the Soviet Union with her husband, where Joseph Stalin and other Soviet authorities promised to send military aid to the Republicans.

She was appointed censor and head of the Republican Foreign Press Office, based in Valencia. After the defeat of the Spanish Republic, de la Mora went into exile in Mexico, where she published her autobiography Doble esplendor (In Place of Splendor). (Note: In Place of Splendour was recently republished by The Clapton Press.) Eleanor Roosevelt, who was a prominent supporter of the Republican cause, presented the book in New York.

She died one day short of her 44th birthday in a traffic accident in Guatemala. Her friend Nancy Johnstone, the writer and erstwhile hotelier, was with her in the car and survived the crash, but disappeared in mysterious circumstances shortly afterwards.
