= Carles Canut =

Spanish actor

Carles Canut i Bartra
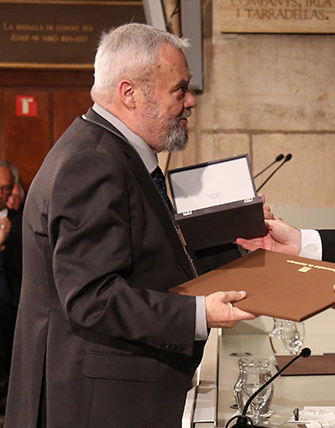
- Canut in 2016
- Born: 23 September 1944; Spain
- Died: 27 September 2018 (aged 74)
- Occupation: Actor

Carles Canut i Bartra (23 September 1944 – 27 September 2018) was a Spanish actor.

He acted in film, television and theater.

== Biography ==
He began his artistic career in 1963. Since then, he has performed in one hundred premieres and nearly seven thousand shows.He was deputy director of the Rajatabla theater group at the Ateneo de Caracas, with which he toured twenty-one countries, and co-founder of GOGO Teatro Experimental Independiente, which operated between 1963 and 1965.

He worked in theater, film, dubbing, and television. He appeared in TV3 (Catalan TV channel) series such as Lo Cartanyà (2006), Plats bruts (1999), and Vostè jutja (1985), where he played the character “Rafeques,” which brought him great popularity.

He was a full member of the Romea Theater Company and deputy director of the Romea Foundation for the Performing Arts until he was appointed director, replacing Miquel Lumbierres.

A big soccer fan, specifically of RCD Espanyol, he was a close collaborator with the sports newspaper Marca (newspaper), where he wrote on the last page of the Espanyol section.

== Filmography ==
- Negro Buenos Aires (2010)
- Don Jaume, el conquistador (1994)
- Makinavaja, el último choriso (1992)
- El aire de un crimen (1988)
- La ràdio folla (1986)
- The Knight of the Dragon (1985)
- Sagrado y obsceno (1975)
