= Isabel Oyarzábal Smith =

Spanish-born journalist, writer, actress and diplomat

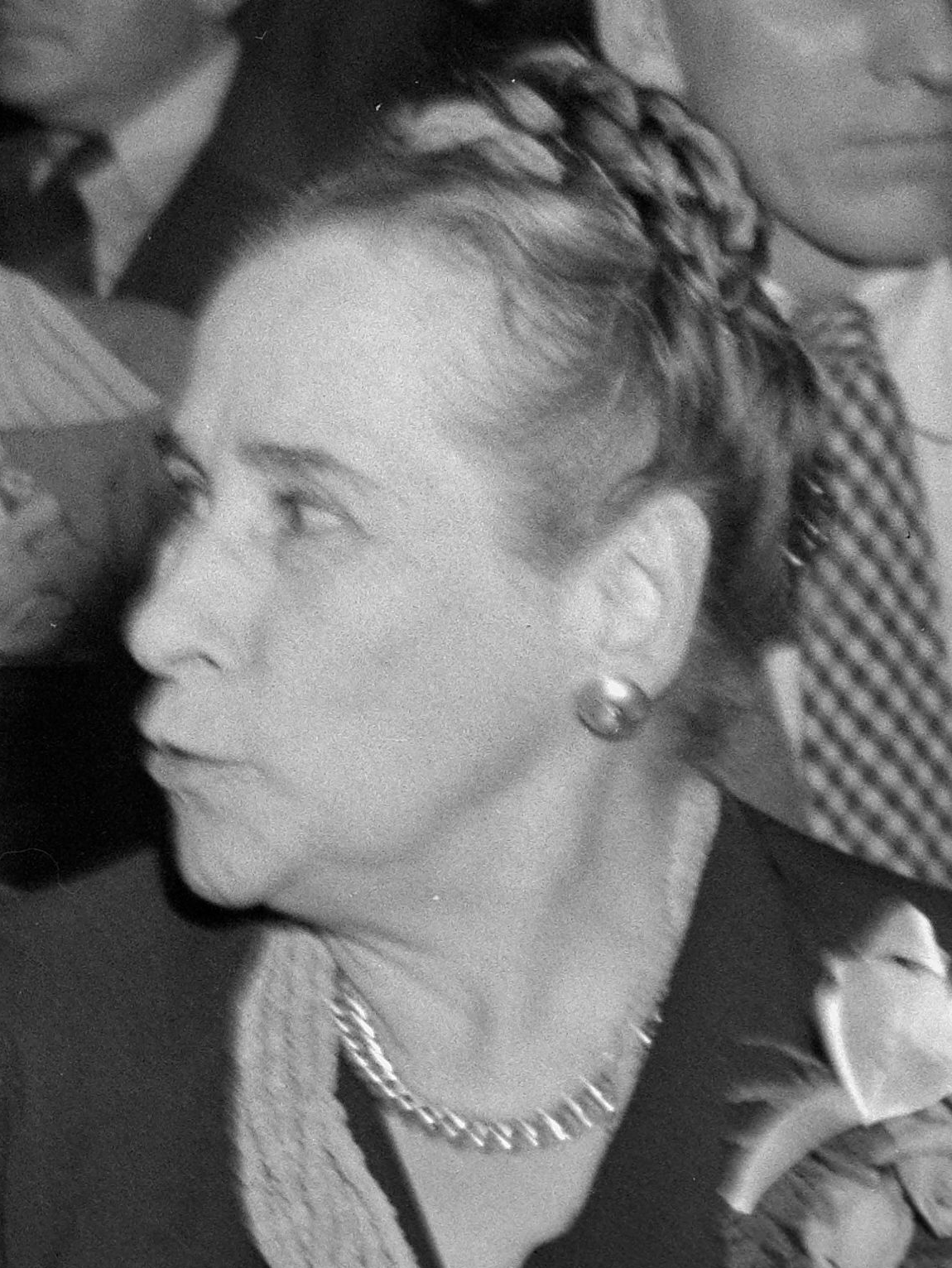
- Oyarzábal during a rally in Madison Square Garden, 1945
- Born: 12 June 1878; Málaga, Kingdom of Spain
- Died: 28 May 1974 (aged 95); Mexico City, Mexico
- Other name: Isabel de Palencia
- Notable work: El traje regional de España
- Movement: Opposition
- Spouse: Ceferino Palencia (m. 1909)
- Mother: Anne Guthrie

Signature
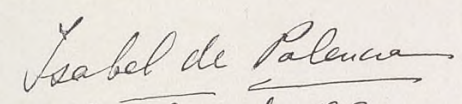

Isabel Oyarzábal Smith (12 June 1878 in Málaga, Andalusia, Spain – 28 May 1974 Mexico City) was a Spanish-born journalist, writer, actress and diplomat, also known as Isabel de Palencia.

== Biography ==
She had a Scottish mother, Anne Guthrie. Oyarzábal's first position was of a Spanish language instructor in Sussex, England. After the death of her father, she met Ceferino Palencia, the son of actress María Tubau. Oyarzábal told Palencia of her desire of becoming an actress and Palencia cast her for the play Pepita Tudó. She kept writing and with her friend Raimunda Avecilla and with her sister Ana Oyarzábal she edited the magazine La Dama y la Vida Ilustrada. She was also a reporter for the Laffan News Bureau (a minor rival to Associated Press) and the newspaper The Standard. In 1909 she married Palencia and then collaborated for the Spanish magazines Blanco y Negro, El Heraldo, Nuevo Mundo and La Esfera.

In 1926, she wrote a Spanish folklore book titled El traje regional de España (transl. The Regional Costumes of Spain). In 1930 she became the only woman on the Slavery Permanent Commission of the League of Nations. In Geneva, at a meeting in this organisation, she met Alexandra Kollontay with whom she formed an enduring friendship.

During the Spanish Civil War she was a spokesperson for the Republic and called for the repeal of the international Non-Intervention Agreement at a Labour Party meeting in October 1936 in Edinburgh, Scotland where she met and influenced Jennie Lee, a Labour activist who later visited Spain to report on the war. She was appointed Ambassador to Sweden for the Republic towards the end of 1936.

In 1939, she relocated with her family to Mexico where she continued writing until her death in 1974. In her memoir Smouldering Freedom, she repeatedly states a desire to return to Spain and a wish to embrace a post fascist and Francoist vision for the country. The memoir ends with the lines;

"In spite of everything, there is no Spanish Republican who doubts the final victory. Spain will again be free and, in the eyes of all sincere liberals, those who do not side openly with her now will not be in a very enviable position from a moral point of view when victory is assured."

== Legacy ==
In 2025 the Spanish government created the Isabel Oyarzábal Award to recognise women who were leading contributors to diplomacy. They chose Oyarzábal because she was Spain's first woman diplomat. The first award was given to Rebeca Grynspan who is a long-time Secretary-General of UN Trade and Development (UNCTAD).
