= Bonaventura Clotet =

Spanish physician (born 1953)

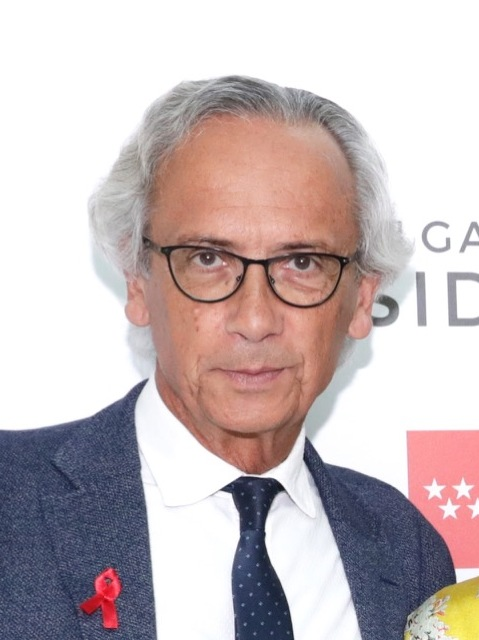
- Born: Bonaventura Clotet Sala; 1953 (age 72–73); Barcelona
- Occupations: virologist, doctor
- Children: Marc Clotet; Aina Clotet

Bonaventura Clotet Sala (born 1953) is a Spanish physician. He was the head of the HIV unit at the Germans Trias i Pujol University Hospital (HUGTiP) in Badalona from 1987 to 2015, and since then he has been the head of the Infectious Diseases service at the same hospital. He has been the director of the IrsiCaixa AIDS Research Institute since 1995 and chairman of the Fight Against AIDS Foundation since 1992. Since 2006 he has been co-director of the HIVACAT AIDS vaccine research program. He has been an associate professor at the Autonomous University of Barcelona since 1986 and director of the Chair in AIDS and Related Diseases at the University of Vic (UVic - UCC), since October 2013. He is the father of the actors Aina Clotet and Marc Clotet.
