= Judith Colell =

Catalan film director, screenwriter and producer

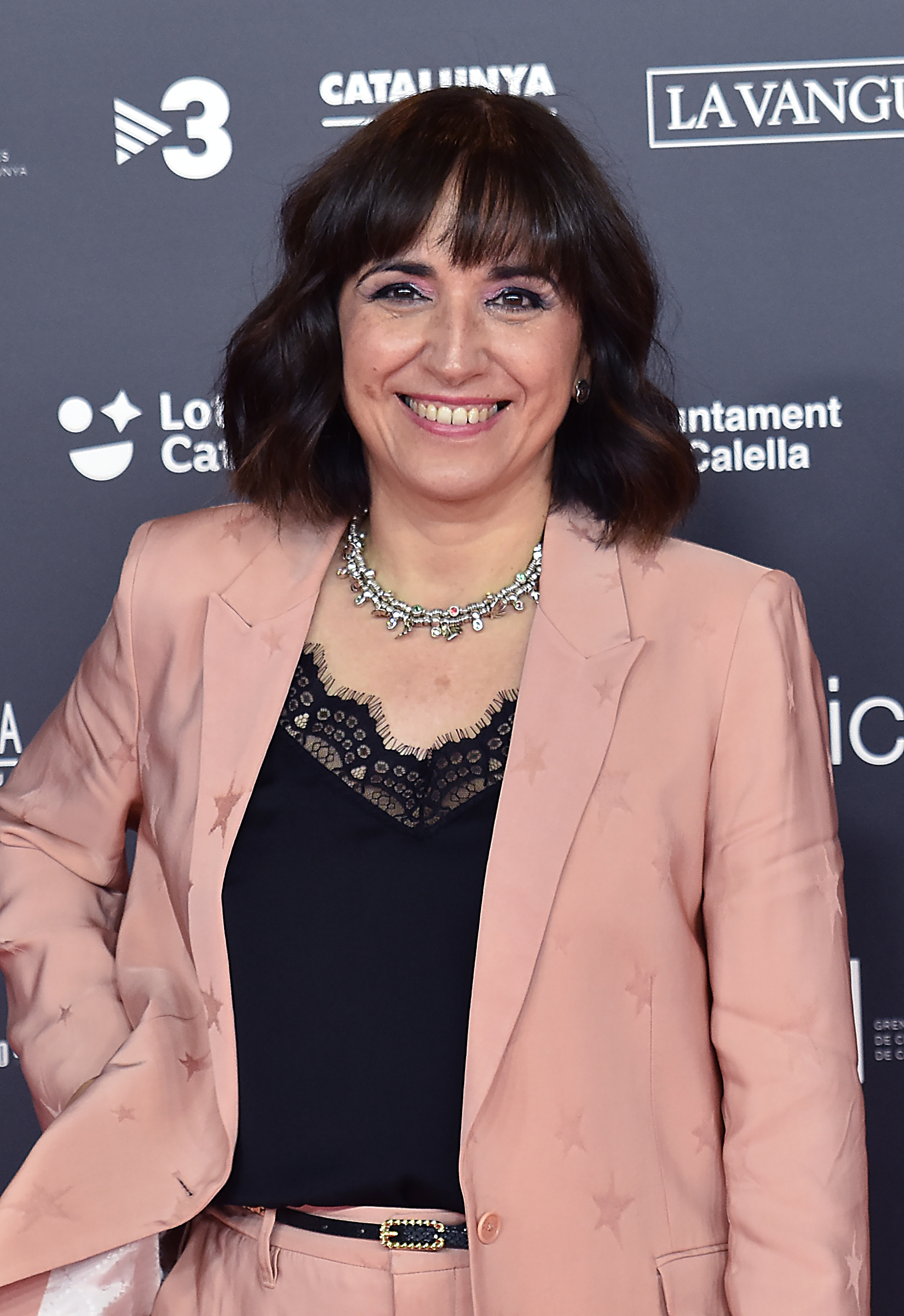
- Judith Colell at the 2021 Gaudí Awards Ceremony
- Born: July 14, 1968 (age 57); Barcelona, Spain
- Occupations: Film director, screenwriter and producer
- Known for: President of Catalan Film Academy
- Notable work: Elisa K, 15 hores

Judith Colell i Pallarès (Barcelona, July 14, 1968) is a Catalan film director, screenwriter and producer. Since July 2021 she has been president of the Catalan Film Academy.

== Biography ==
Colell was awarded a degree in art history at the University of Barcelona. Afterwards she got a certificate in film from the New York University. Since then, she has directed a number of films, including Dones, winner of the 2001 Butaca Prize for best Catalan film, and Elisa K, which was co-directed by Jordi Cadena and has been shown at film festivals across the world. This film won the Jury's Special Award at 2010s edition of the San Sebastián International Film Festival and the National Prize Of Cinema of the Catalan Government, the Generalitat de Catalunya. She has also directed some telefilms, like Positius, Radiacions, and L'últim ball de Carmen Amaya, the last of which aired on TV3 and was nominated for the Gaudí Awards.

Colell combines her work as a director with university teaching. Since 2017, she has been the director of the Degree in Audiovisual Communication at Blanquerna FCRI University.

She is an active voice in the sector. In 2011, she was elected vice president of the Spanish Film Academy, and in 2017 she joined the board of the Catalan Film Academy, then chaired by Isona Pasola. Since July 2021, she has served as the president of the Catalan Film Academy.

Her most recent film, 15 horas, was shot entirely in the Dominican Republic. The film, starring Sterlyn Ramírez, Marc Clotet and Chabela Estrella de Bisonó, tells the story of Aura, a female victim of gender violence, who has fifteen hours to escape from her husband and attacker. The project has been recognized with the Signis Prize, awarded by the World Catholic Association for Communication, at the Málaga Film Festival.

== Personal life ==
Colell lives with Jordi Cadena in Sant Cugat del Vallès and is mother of two.

== Filmography as director ==
- 1991: Clara foc (shortfilm)
- 1995: Escrit a la pell (shortfilm)
- 1997: El domini dels sentits
- 2000: Nosotras / Dones
- 2003: Fragments
- 2006: 53 dies d'hivern
- 2007: Positius
- 2010: Elisa K
- 2014: L'últim ball de Carmen Amaya
- 2021: 15 horas
- 2025: Frontier
