= Joaquim Clotet =

Spanish philosopher (born 1946)

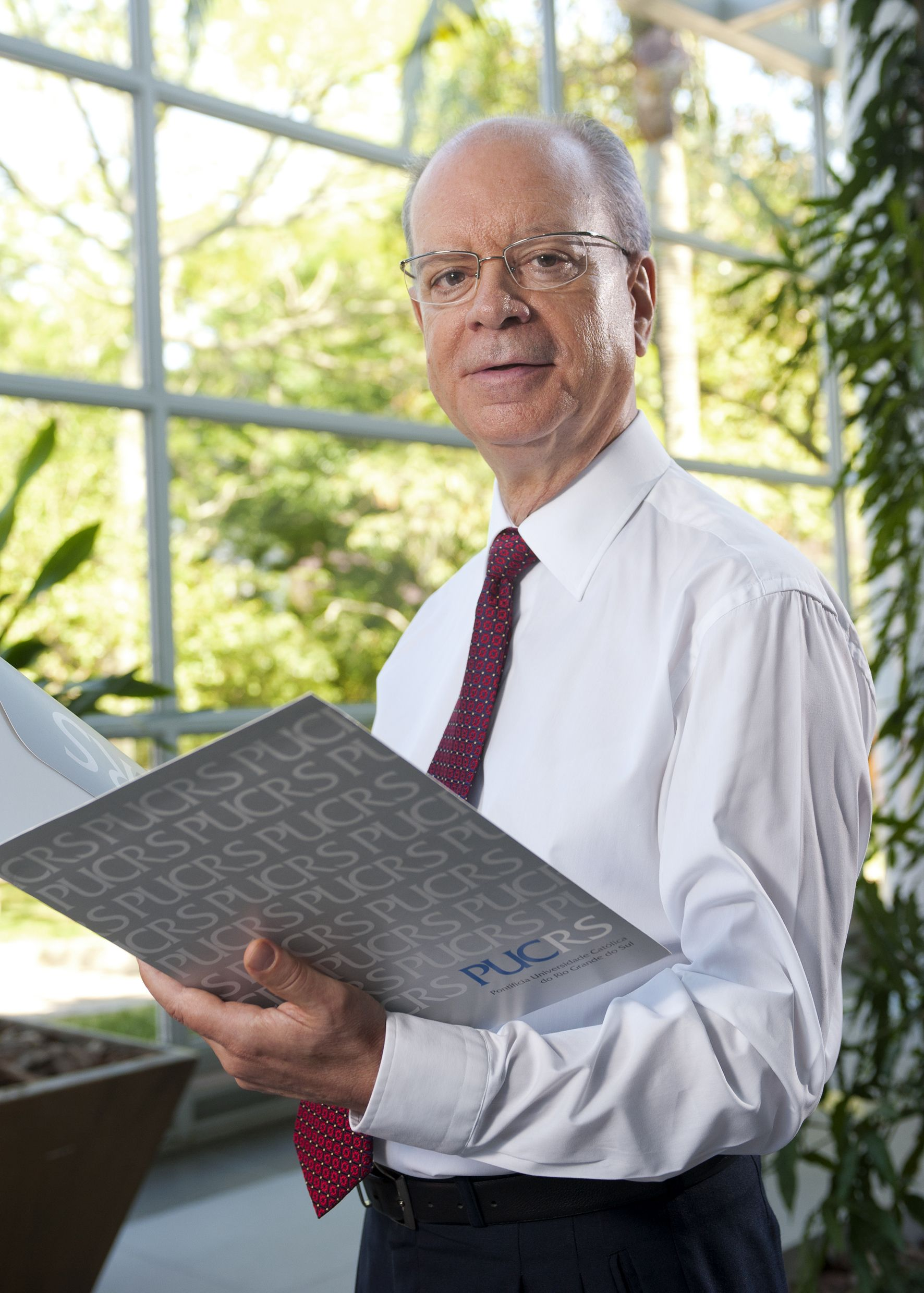
President of PUCRS

Joaquim Clotet Martí (Mataró, Spain, March 16, 1946) holds a doctorate in Philosophy and Letters, with work in the area of Ethics and Bioethics. Since 2004, he has been the President of the Pontifical Catholic University of Rio Grande do Sul (PUCRS), Porto Alegre, Brazil.

== Biography and academic background ==
Born in the city of Mataró, a province of Barcelona in Spain, Joaquim Clotet graduated with a degree in English and Philosophy and Letters (1972) from the University of Barcelona (Spain), obtaining a doctorate in Philosophy and Letters from the same institution (1980).

After his doctorate, he completed studies and research at the Gregorian University of Rome (Italy), the University of London (United Kingdom), Georgetown University (Washington D.C., USA), the University of Ottawa (Canada), Oxford University (United Kingdom) and the University of Warwick (Coventry, United Kingdom).

After teaching for nine years in the Faculty of Philosophy at the University of Barcelona, he moved to Porto Alegre in 1984, when he became a full professor at PUCRS. He also taught at UFRGS in the Graduate Program in Medicine – Medical Practice – in 1995 and 1996.

From 1994 to 2004, he was the Senior Vice President of PUCRS, assuming the Presidency in December 2004. He was reappointed in 2008 and 2012. His administration has been highlighted by the increase of internationalization in all academic areas, and the incentive for research, entrepreneurship and innovation. In addition to being President, Clotet is Full Professor of Bioethics in the Master's and Doctorate Programs of Medicine and Dentistry. He is a visiting professor at the University of Santiago de Compostela (Spain), the University of San Marcos (Peru), the National University of La Plata (Argentina) and the University of Buenos Aires (Argentina).

He was a member of the National Committee on Access and Use of the Human Genome, by the Ministry of Health, the National Committee for Ethics in Research, by the Ministry of Health (1997-2001) and President of the Riograndense Society of Bioethics (1999-2001).

He was also a member of the Hume Society, the Kennedy Institute of Ethics (USA), the Iberoamerican Society for Utilitarian Studies (Spain), the Hastings Center (USA) and the American Society of Law, Medicine and Ethics (USA).

Visiting Fellow, Exeter College, University of Oxford, 2017.

== Publications ==
- Bioética: uma visão panorâmica (Bioethics: an overview)

  Porto Alegre, Brazil, Edipucrs, 2005

- Bioética: uma aproximação(Bioethics: an approximation)

   Porto Alegre, Brazil, Edipucrs, 2003

- Uma introdução à Bioética (An Introduction to Bioethics)

   Porto Alegre, Brazil, Nestlé, 2002-contributor

- Bioética(Bioethics)

   Porto Alegre, Brazil, Edipucrs, 2001-editor

- Sobre Bioética e Robert M. Veatch: textos(On bioethics and Robert M. Veatch: papers)

   Porto Alegre, Brazil, Edipucrs, 2001-editor

- Consentimento informado e a sua prática na assistência e na pesquisa no Brasil(Informed consent and its practice in assistance and research in Brazil)

   Porto Alegre, Brazil, Edipucrs, 2000-contributor

- A justiça: abordagens filosóficas(Justice: philosophical approaches)

   Porto Alegre, Brazil, PUCRS-Editora Acadêmica,1988-editor

- Los 60 Conceptos Claves de la Antropología Cultural(The 60 Key Concepts of Cultural Anthropology)

   Barcelona, Spain, Daimon,1982-contributor

- G.E.Moore: Principhia Ethica

   Barcelona, Spain, Editorial Laia,1982-editor, introduction and comments

- Guía Didáctica Filosofía 3 BUP(Philosophy Coursebook 3 – High School)

   Zaragoza, Spain, Edelvives,1978-contributor

- Filosofía 3 BUP(Philosophy 3 – High School)

   Zaragoza, Spain,1977-contributor

Clotet has also published a variety of articles in national and international scientific journals.

== Awards received ==
2013

- Doctor Honoris Causa - Dalhousie University

2012

- Luiz de Miranda Poet Award, given by the Royal Academy of Letters – Order of the Brotherhood of Poets – Brazil
- Eastern Troops Award, in the Personality Category, given by the Military Police - Command of Policing the Capital – 19th Battalion of the Military Police

2009

- Brother Afonso Medal, awarded by PUCRS

2008

- Diploma from the Order of the Knights of Osório, Brazilian Military – Southern Military Command, Cavalry Guard's 3rd Regiment

2007

- Honorary Title of Citizen of Porto Alegre, City Hall of Porto Alegre, Law Nº 10.243, August 29, 2007,

1972

- Beca-Prêmio (Academic Distinction and Grant awarded to the most outstanding student), School of Modern Languages at the University of Barcelona
