= Elm Park Mansions =

Coordinates: 51.4852°N 0.1794°W

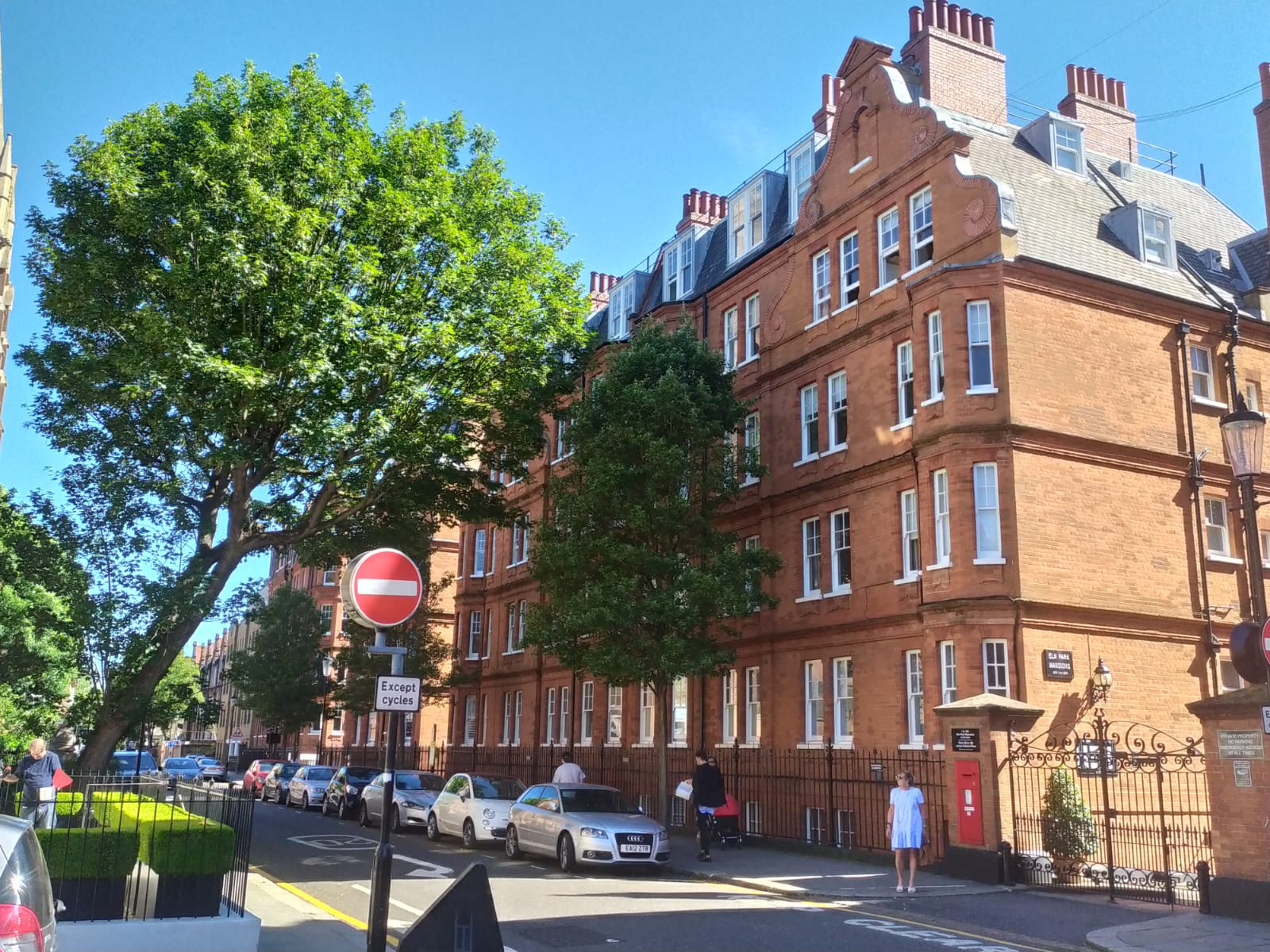
- Elm Park Mansions in Chelsea
- Interactive map of the Elm Park Mansions area

General information
- Type: Residential buildings
- Location: 26-60 Park Walk, Chelsea, London, United Kingdom
- Completed: c. 1900

Elm Park Mansions is a row of historic residential buildings in Chelsea, London, U.K.

== History ==
The land belonged to Major Sloane Stanley by 1900. Around that time, Stanley leased it to the Metropolitan Industrial Dwellings Company, who built five-storey red-brick buildings along 26-60 Park Walk and called them Elm Park Mansions.

In 1900, The Soldiers' and Sailors' Families Association rented twelve suites of rooms in Elm Park Mansions to accommodate officers' widows and unmarried daughters.

The satirist and playboy William Donaldson lived at 139 Elm Park Mansions in the 1970s-1980s.
