= Marc Clotet =

Spanish actor and model (born 1980)

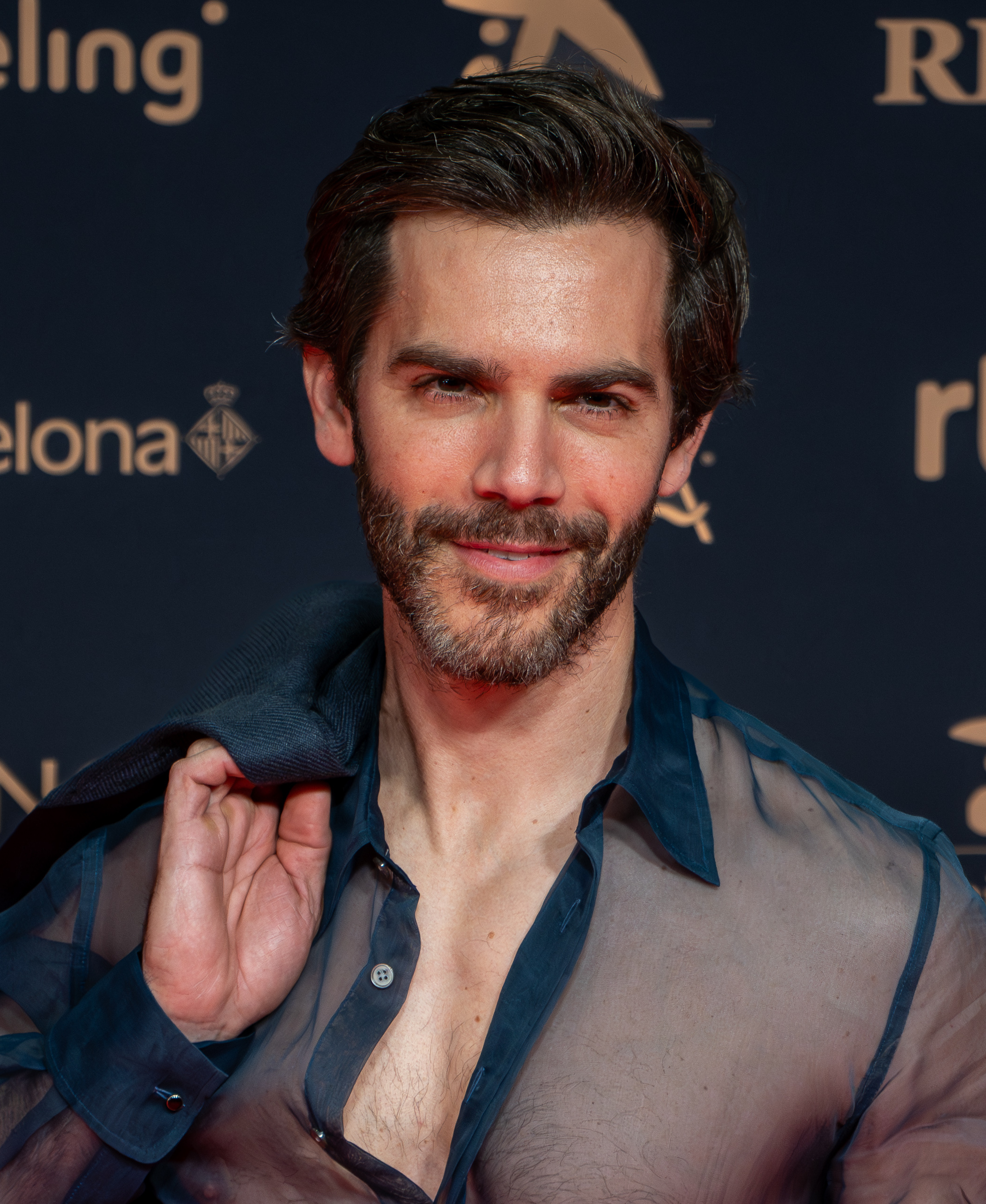
- Clotet in 2026
- Born: Marc Clotet Fresquet; 29 April 1980 (age 46); Barcelona, Spain
- Education: Ramon Llull University
- Occupations: Actor; model
- Years active: 1997–present
- Spouse: Ana de Armas (m. 2011; div. 2013)
- Partner(s): Natalia Sánchez (2013–present)
- Children: 2
- Father: Bonaventura Clotet
- Relatives: Aina Clotet (sister)

Marc Clotet Fresquet (born 29 April 1980) is a Spanish actor and model.

== Life and career ==
Marc Clotet Fresquet was born in Barcelona on 29 April 1980. In addition to his acting career, Clotet has also worked as a model, most recently for the Spanish magazine Showdown.

He earned notoriety for his roles in the soap opera El cor de la ciutat and the teen drama Física o química.

Clotet was married to Cuban-Spanish actress Ana de Armas from July 2011 to 2013. In 2013, he began dating actress Natalia Sánchez; they have a daughter, Lia, and a son, Neo.

On 12 September 2024, he was revealed to be one of the presenters of the Junior Eurovision Song Contest 2024, along with Ruth Lorenzo and Melani García.

Marc is the son of the physician Bonaventura Clotet and the brother of the actress Aina Clotet.

== Filmography ==
=== Film ===
- The Sleeping Voice (2011) – Paulino
- Gernika bajo las bombas (2012)
- El jugador de ajedrez (2017)
- La Estrella (2013) – Salva

=== Television ===
- Tocao del ala (1997)
- El cor de la ciutat (2007–2009) – Iago
- El comisario (2008–2009) – Pau Montaner
- Física o química (2009–2011) – Vicente Vaquero
- El Caso. Crónica de sucesos (2016) – Gerardo de Zabaleta
- Morocco: Love In Times of War (2017) – Alejandro Prada
- Por amar sin ley (season 2) (2019) – Adrián Carballo
- Poskad dari Alhambra (2020)
- Junior Eurovision Song Contest 2024 – Co-host

Preceded by (France) Olivier Minne, Laury Thilleman and Ophenya	Junior Eurovision Song Contest presenter 2024; With: Ruth Lorenzo and Melani García	Succeeded by (Georgia (country)) David Aladashvili and Liza Tsiklauri
