= Ignacio Hidalgo de Cisneros =

Spanish military aviator (1896–1966)

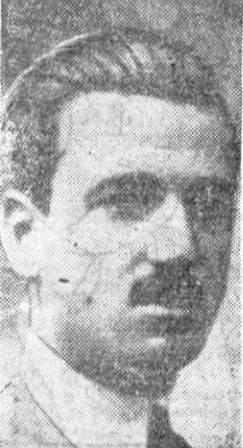
- Born: Ignacio Hidalgo de Cisneros; 11 July 1896; Vitoria, Spain
- Died: 9 February 1966 (aged 69) Bucharest, SR Romania
- Buried: Bellu Cemetery
- Allegiance: Kingdom of Spain (1911–1931); Spanish Republic (1931–1939)
- Branch: Spanish Republican Air Force
- Service years: 1911–1939
- Commands: Air Forces of the Spanish Republic
- Conflicts: Rif War; Spanish Civil War
- Spouse: Constancia de la Mora

Ignacio Pío Juan Hidalgo de Cisneros y López-Montenegro (11 July 1896 – 9 February 1966) was a Spanish military aviator. He is known as commander of the Republican Air Force during the Spanish Civil War. He is also noted as one of the few aristocrats to join the Spanish Communist Party and author of war memoirs, published in the 1960s.

== Carlist ==
Carlist standard

Ignacio Hidalgo de Cisneros was descendant to an aristocratic family, many times noted in the history of Spain. The Hidalgos, originating from Léon, and the Cisneros, originating from Palencia, intermarried a number of times across the centuries. Ignacio's great-great-grandfather, Francisco Hidalgo de Cisneros y Seija (1730–1794), as a younger son did not inherit the family wealth; he left his native Gipuzkoa and rising to teniente general settled in Cartagena. His son and great-grandfather of Ignacio, Baltasar Hidalgo de Cisneros y de la Torre (1756–1829), became the next to last Viceroy of the Viceroyalty of the Río de la Plata. His son and Ignacio's grandfather, Francisco Hidalgo de Cisneros y Gaztambide (1803–1864), became also a military who sided with the legitimists during the First Carlist War; he returned from Murcia to the North, settling in Álava. His son and Ignacio's father, Ignacio Hidalgo de Cisneros y Unceta (1852–1903), abandoned school to join the Carlists during the Third Carlist War and became head of the personal guard of the claimant. He accompanied Carlos VII into exile and returned to Álava following the amnesty. He married Pilar Manso de Zúñiga y Echeverría; the couple had 4 children. Following early death of his wife, in 1881 he married María López de Montenegro y González de Castejón, a widow who had earlied married the brother of his first wife and already had two children. The couple had only one son, Ignacio.

As a child Ignacio was brought up in a religious and traditionalist ambience, with the family house in Vitoria often visited by Carlist combatants. He was indeed captivated by Carlism:

During my childhood there must have been frequent references made at home to the Carlists, as my earliest memories are all about the events in which they played a key role. [...] I remember talks about a new Carlist uprising forthcoming. At that time I imagined that they were hiding all around Vitoria, waiting for a sign to jump out of their hideouts and capture the city. Each time I was looking at the nearby mountains from the window of my house – located at the intersection of Estacion and Florida streets – I imagined they were full of Carlists. At night I was dreaming about the Carlists. The image of my father is always related to the Carlists – I hardly remember him the way I used to see him every day. Usually when I think of my father, I see a young man in a cavalry outfit, with a carefully grown beard and a gutsily worn Carlist beret. This image is undoubtedly derived from his war photographs that we had at home.

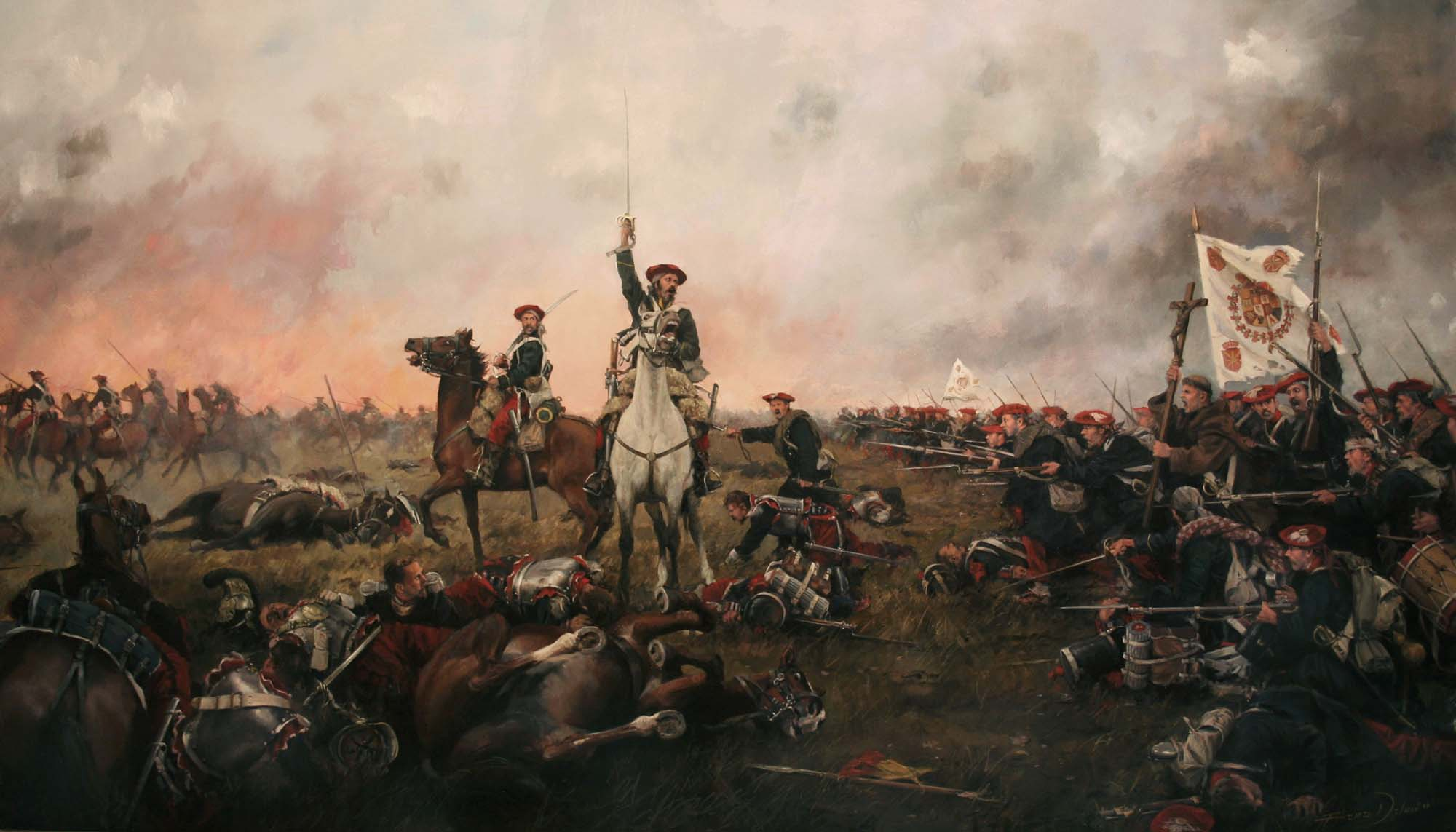
Carist troops represented during the First Carlist War

Orphaned by his father at the age of 7, Ignacio was first educated in schools ran by the Servants of Mary order in Vitoria. At that time, having witnessed attempts by local aviation pioneers on the hills surrounding Vitoria, he was fascinated by planes and by flying. In 1910 he joined the cadet college in Vitoria, determined to become an officer and to serve as a military pilot. Unaccustomed to discipline and enjoying life rather than pursuing his curriculum, as emergency measure the young Ignacio was transferred to Toledo, to the school managed by the Carlist friend of his late father, Cesáreo Sanz Escartín; unsuccessful also there, at unspecified date he finally completed the Madrid Academia de Révora.

== Monarchist ==
Flag of Spain (1875–1931)

Having completed his initial military education, in 1912 Hidalgo de Cisneros entered Academia de Intendencia in Ávila; the school was supposed to be just a stepping stone towards his aviation career. For the time being his military intendant training got him transferred to Andalusia, where at various locations he was serving in supply branch of the army, leading an enjoyable life of a young military bon vivant. Once his service duration enabled him to volunteer to Morocco, he immediately did so, serving in intendency and logistics some time between 1917 and 1919. Once the Spanish army commenced formal aviation training he was transferred to the Cuatro Vientos air base, where in 1919-1920 Hidalgo de Cisneros completed flying courses and joined the nascent Aviación Militar Española. Shortly afterwards he was again commissioned to Morocco; stationed in Melilla he flew his first combat missions. Rapidly gaining experience in reconnaissance, bombing, assault and transport sorties, in the early 1920s, still a teniente, he already started to act as a flying instructor. At an unspecified date he was promoted to captain and just a year later to major, taking part in all key operations of the campaign. Following termination of the Rif War in 1925 Hidalgo de Cisneros was nominated deputy commander of the Alcala de Henares aviation school.

In 1927 Hidalgo de Cisneros was nominated "Commander of Air Forces in the Spanish Sahara", all his assets having been 10 aircraft. He was stationed first at Cabo Juby and later in Villa Cisneros; his task was about keeping the local native tribes in check by demonstrating Spanish military prowess, supervising postal operations, performing cartographic reconnaissance flights and ensuring safety of regular French trans-Atlantic services, which used the Spanish Sahara airfields as re-fuelling and supply outposts. He was also inevitably entangled in dealings with the natives, performing informal quasi-political functions. Having completed advanced courses he gained new skills. In 1929 he was transferred to the Mar Chica seaplane airbase near Melilla.

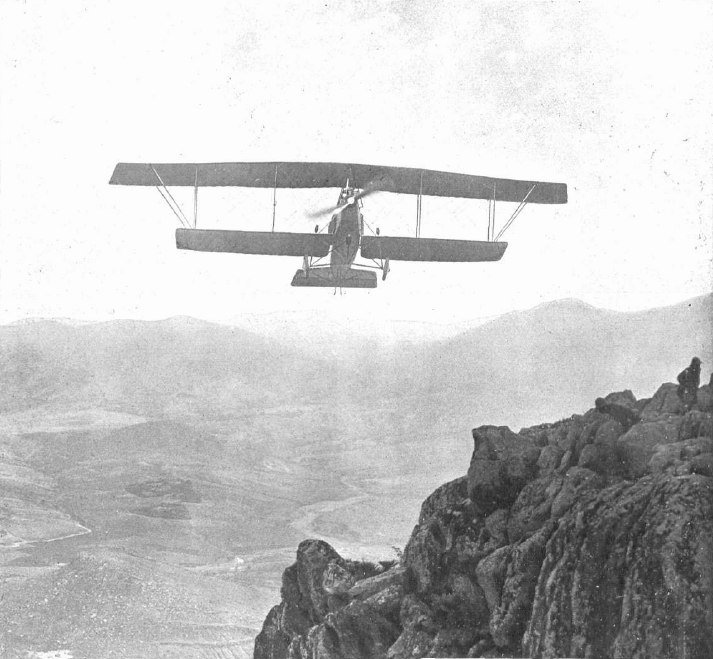
Spanish aircraft over Morocco

Hardly concerned with politics and having long abandoned not only his juvenile Carlism but also his faith, as a young officer Hidalgo de Cisneros considered himself a patriotic Spaniard serving the cause of the king and the country; during service in Andalusia he was enraged by British presence in Gibraltar, claiming he would die of hunger rather than allow the English to stay on the Spanish soil. During the First World War he sympathised with Central Powers rather than with Entente, following the Annual disaster he was anxious to defend the glory of Spain and administer exemplary punishment to rebellious Berber tribes. He greeted the coup of Primo de Rivera with indifference, entirely unperturbed by end of liberal democracy and by coming of the dictatorship. Later on he started to lean towards some cynicism, possibly grown during the years spent on mortally dangerous warfare missions. Having met Primo de Rivera personally Hidalgo de Cisneros started to respect though not necessarily admire the dictator, crediting him for military competence and personal format, but gradually getting unsure about his political vision.

== Republican ==
Flag of Spanish Republic

In the late 1920s Hidalgo de Cisneros grew increasingly skeptical about Spanish politics. Though far from militancy, he was irritated by adulation of Primo, incompetence and corporatism of the military, omnipresence of the Church, señoritismo culture among the upper strata and, last but not least, by social abyss diving the poor and the rich, especially in the South of Spain. Having befriended a number of opposition-minded individuals, especially other aviators Ramón Franco, Jose Legorburu and Miguel Nuñez de Prado, he developed indifference towards the monarchy in general and towards Alfonso XIII in particular, as he met and was unimpressed by the king. Hidalgo de Cisneros did not make a secret of his observations, instigating also minor demonstrations of dissent in his unit.

Once on leave in Madrid Hidalgo de Cisneros was somewhat accidentally involved in the Republican conspiracy; his personal rather than political public outburst against a monarchically minded opponent triggered invitation to join the plot. Unaware of rather ruritanian nature of the scheme, sketchy, chaotic and supported by few vacillating officers and politicians, Hidalgo de Cisneros with his decisiveness emerged, to his own surprise and unease, as one of the leaders of the coup. He flew from the South to Madrid and following consultations with Miguel Maura, Ramón Franco and Queipo de Llano, on 15 December 1930 he and few other conspirators took control of the Cuatro Vientos air base. He flew few sorties over Madrid, dropping leaflets supposed to ignite a general strike, allegedly pre-agreed with UGT. As the city remained indifferent and government troops were already approaching the airport, he boarded the aircraft and fled to Portugal.

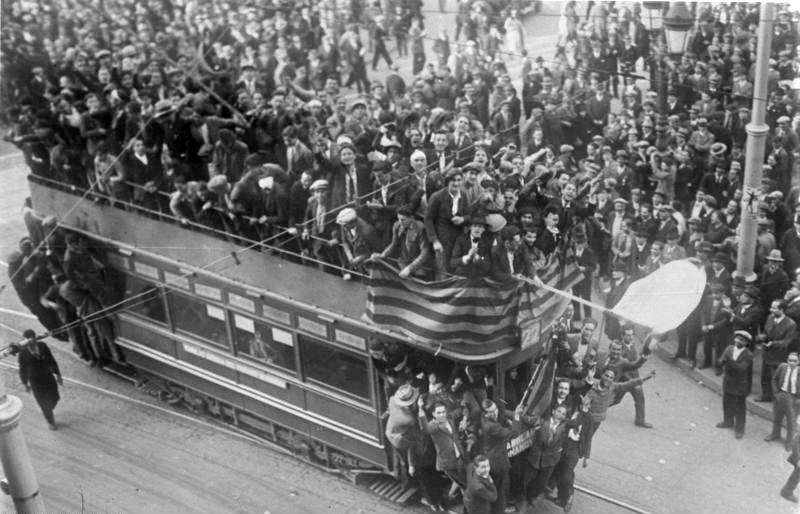
Republic declared, 1931

Having moved to France, in Paris Hidalgo de Cisneros met a number of emigrant Spanish politicians, especially Marcelino Domingo, Diego Martínez Barrio and Indalecio Prieto; with the latter he forged a closer, friendly relationship. Once the monarchy was toppled in April 1931 he returned to Madrid, hailed nationwide as "a hero from Cuatro Vientos". With Ramón Franco chief of the Republican Air Force, he was reinstated at his Alcala de Henares post, soon promoted to commander of the unit. As Spanish politics was getting increasingly and rapidly charged with sectarian militancy, Hidalgo de Cisneros with little hesitation blamed the Church, monarchists, landowners, aristocracy and reactionary forces for the erupting violence; this stance earned him hostile attitude of most of his family. At that time he fell in love with Constancia de la Mora (es), also an aristocratic outcast, though much more radical and belligerent than himself. Following the marriage in 1933, in the summer of that year Hidalgo de Cisneros was appointed air attaché in Rome and Berlin.

== Frentepopulista ==
Flag of Popular Front

Already before commencing his diplomatic mission Hidalgo de Cisneros co-drafted plans to purge the aviation corps of officers considered monarchist or reactionary; he was disappointed to see that the Republican minister did not act on his advice. Uneasy about representing an anti-democratic Lerroux government, he welcomed the 1934 revolution as a response given by the working people to reactionary forces. Later that year he travelled from Rome to Madrid and engineered a plot to move Prieto out of the country, in his aviation officer uniform driving the socialist leader in the trunk of his car from Madrid almost to the French frontier. Following an official visit to Nazi Germany he met the imprisoned Manuel Azaña and briefed him on co-operation between the Spanish Right and the Nazis; he was profoundly disappointed by what he perceived a cowardly and self-interested response of the Republican leader. In the summer of 1935 at his own request Hidalgo was recalled from Rome and assigned to cartographic section of General Staff, where he used to show up every day with a fresh issue of El socialista ostentatiously on display. Later that year he was assigned to the Seville air base, considered bulwark of the monarchist military.

Following victory of Popular Front Hidalgo de Cisneros was nominated adjutant to Nuñez de Prado, the newly appointed head of the Air Force, later promoted to ADC of the prime minister. He again compiled the list of officers considered reactionary to be purged and was again disappointed by inaction of the minister Giral, the prime minister Cesares Quiroga and the president Azaña. In the early summer of 1936 he tried to prevent an expected rebellion in the air forces by organizing semi-official vigilance service, partially based on socialist and communist conspiracy network. Following the actual coup, once Nuñez de Prado was captured and executed by the rebels, Hidalgo de Cisneros tried to co-ordinate command of the air forces before in September 1936 Prieto, than the new minister of defense, nominated him head of Air General Staff, effectively commander of Fuerzas Aéreas de la República Española. During his first months in command Hidalgo de Cisneros shuttled the squadrons between airports concentrating aircraft on key Nationalist advance routes, tried to co-ordinate logistics and to make up for the loss of pilots, most of whom opted for the rebels; despite having been head of military aviation, he also flew combat sorties himself. In the fall of 1936 he supervised arrival of Soviet aircraft and airmen. Increasingly perplexed by lack of discipline and chaos among the Republicans, he blamed the anarchists for disorganizing the military effort and the socialists, unwilling to confront FAI and CNT, for appeasement and indecision. Though ignorant about and indeed uninterested in the communist theoretical vision, he appreciated PCE for discipline and military contribution, impressed also by military support provided by the Soviet Union. As a result, at unspecified time in late 1936 Hidalgo de Cisneros joined the PCE.

== Communist ==
Bandera roja

Of all branches of the Republican army, the one most thoroughly dominated by the Soviets was the Air Force. As head of aviation Hidalgo de Cisneros was supported by the Russians, who considered him a convenient front man, facilitating their grip on the People's Army. The Republican aviation, "La Gloriosa", was in fact managed by the Russian air attaché Smushkevich, who appreciated Hidalgo for dedication and loyalty, but thought him incompetent for the job. Hidalgo de Cisneros apparently accepted his role of the Soviet assistant; he was hardly informed about operations, status and location of FARE squadrons. Given his role, it is not clear what was his contribution to the rout of Italian forces at Guadalajara in March 1937, arguably the most successful operation of the Republican aviation. However, as Republican air force was entirely controlled by the Russians, some Republican ground operations suffered from lack of air support in case the Soviets decided to obstruct them, like in case of the spring 1938 offensive in Extremadura.

Hidalgo de Cisneros remained totally loyal to the Soviets also when pushing for introduction of political commissars in the army; it is not clear how much he knew about Andreu Nin having been tortured in his Alcala de Henares house, turned into the NKVD dungeons. In December 1937 and in November 1938 he travelled to Moscow, first time officially for medical treatment and the second time as a special last-minute envoy of Negrin. He met Stalin and was impressed by his charming personality, especially that the Soviet leader agreed to deliver the supplies requested. In September 1938 promoted to general, after the fall of Catalonia Hidalgo de Cisneros briefly stayed in France and then returned to the Republican zone. He refused to join Casado's coup and remained loyal to Negrin; on 6 March he left Spain, flying from Elda to Toulouse.

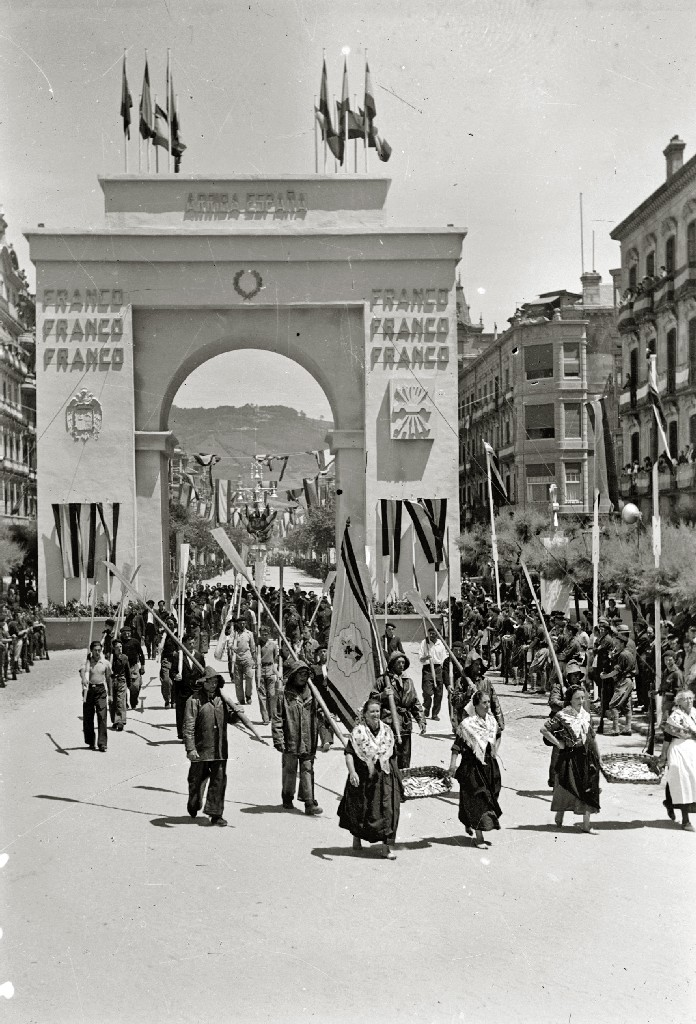
San Sebastián, Spain, summer 1939

At unspecified time in 1939 Hidalgo de Cisneros moved from France to the USSR. His exact role and whereabouts are not clear; according to an oral testimony he was briefly engaged in the aviation industry; allegedly offered a rank of general in the Red Army he declined. At unspecified time, possibly in late 1939 though definitely prior to 1941 he transferred via France to Mexico. In June 1942 in a US communist periodical he called for opening of the second front in Europe. Living in Mexico City, where he re-joined his wife parted in early 1939, thanks to her contacts he met Eleanor Roosevelt, Bette Davis and other celebrities. Hidalgo de Cisneros befriended Wenceslao Roces, Ignacio Mantecón, Pablo Neruda and Ernest Hemingway, though happy days interchanged with depressive ones. It is in Mexico that he got divorced; the official reason quoted was mutual infidelity, though Hidalgo de Cisneros has later always referred to his former wife with respect. Active among the Spanish communist emigres he was increasingly unhappy about their witch-hunting disputes and intrigues. With his assets running out and the whisky brand management enterprise turning into a failure, he was suffering also from lack of funds. His American friends arranged for him a job of a horse riding instructor in a US college, but as a communist activist he was denied the residence permit; some sources claim he turned down the offer himself. In financial dire straits he decided to return to Europe. Taking advantage of the PCE network in France he arranged residence behind the Iron Curtain; as at that time Poland was admitting a limited number of Spanish communist exiles, in 1949 or 1950 he settled in Warsaw.

== Soviet ==
Soviet flag

In the Polish capital Hidalgo de Cisneros was employed by the Spanish section of Polish Radio and worked on his memoirs; living in a comfortable apartment and paid a salary of 2,000 zloty (the average pay was 550 zlotys) he was reportedly embarrassed about his privileged status. He was the most distinguished person within a small community of local Republican exiles, which included Manuel Sánchez Arcas, Francisco Antón Sanz and Álvaro Peláez Antón; he was also celebrated by the Polish combatants of the International Brigades. In 1954 he was elected to the PCE Central Committee. In 1959 he was to return to Mexico via Moscow, but for unclear reasons the plan did not work out. On request of Santiago Álvarez, who at that time acted as PCE liaison with Eastern European communist regimes, Hidalgo de Cisneros was readmitted to Warsaw, where he was granted retiree status with 3,000 zloty pension. At that time the manuscript of first part of his memoirs was ready and being edited by Spanish staff of Radio España Independiente (es), in 1955 moved from Moscow to Bucharest. In 1961 he travelled to Romania to finalize the publication; having received VIP treatment, he spent some time in the luxury government spa in Sinaia.

In Romania Hidalgo de Cisneros met Ramón Mendezona, José Antonio Uribes, Marcel Plans and Federico Melchor, though in particular he befriended Luis Galán, son of his Avila Academia de Intendencia instructor and also a Republican exile, working in REI. Galán suggested he move permanently to Romania, a proposal welcomed by Hidalgo de Cisneros. Despite 12 years of residence he did not feel well in Poland, depressed by early dusk, cold and rainy climate, melancholic flat countryside and potato-based cuisine; writing to Galan from the Polish mountain resort of Zakopane he complained about having no assistance when working on the politically sensitive second part of his memoirs. In late 1962 he moved to Romania and settled at Bulevard Michurin in Bucharest, in a small but carefully selected apartment and with Roberto Carillo as his neighbor. It is not clear what citizenship he held, either in Romania or earlier in Poland. He travelled to Western Europe, frequently visiting France to take part in PCE sittings and to see his relatives

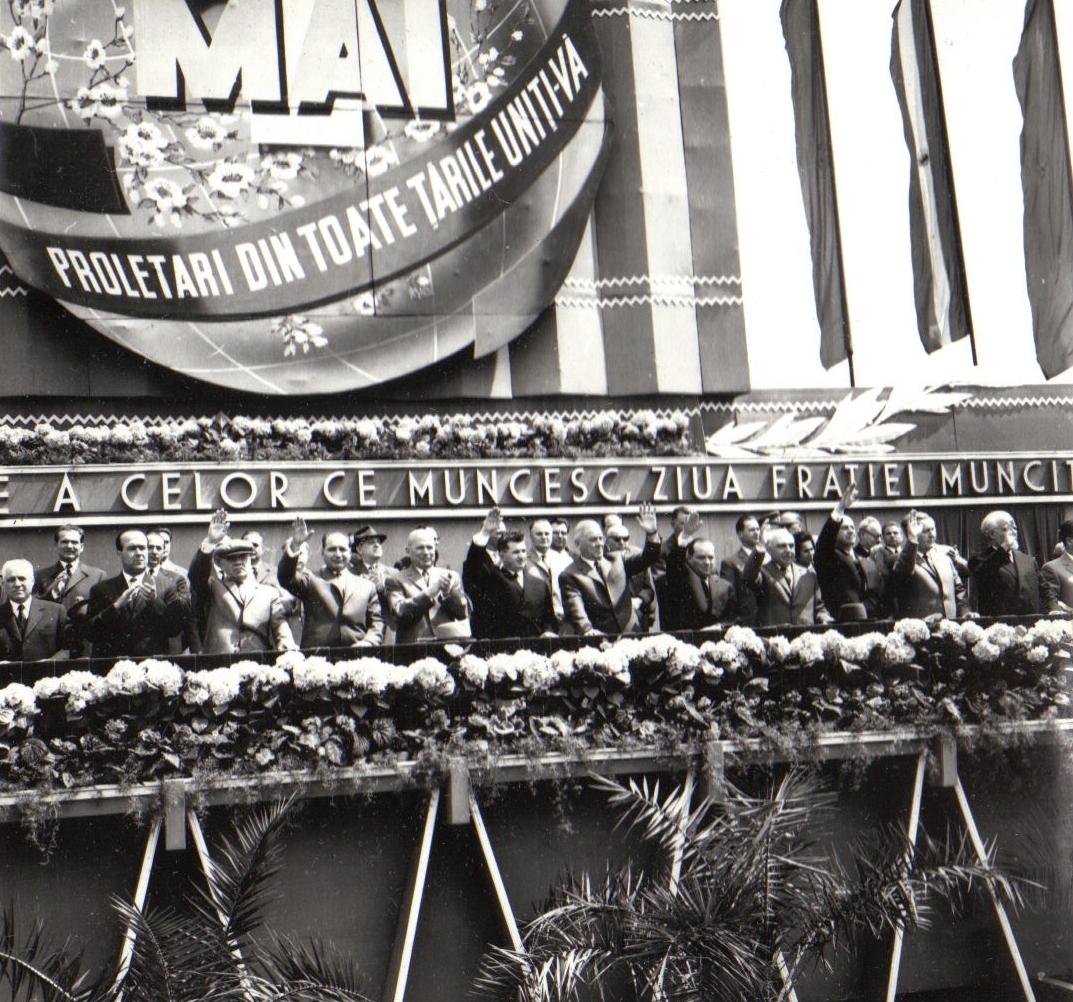
Bucharest, 1 May 1965

During last years of his life Hidalgo de Cisneros kept working on the second volume of his memoirs and kept delivering charlas over REI; in the early 1960s his memoirs were published in Poland and in France. In 1965 he travelled to East Berlin giving a lecture to the East German air force audience on the Republican aviation; he took the opportunity to accuse the Bundeswehr general Heinrich Trettner of having been a war criminal, guilty of atrocities committed during the Spanish Civil War. Before boarding the plane back he suffered from heart attack; partially recovered, he returned to Bucharest, where he suffered another, fatal stroke. Hidalgo de Cisneros was buried in Bellu Cemetery with full Romanian military honors, his grave covered with mountains of red flowers from communist authorities, PCE leaders and delegations of Interbrigadistas from Romania, Poland, France, Germany, Bulgaria and the USSR. No Catholic priest was present and as he had no children, it was other family members who arrived from Spain. The second volume of his memoirs was published posthumously the same year. His remnants were re-buried in the family grave in Vitoria in 1994.

== See also ==
- Spanish Republican Air Force
- Spanish Communist Party
- Spanish Civil War
- Constancia de la Mora
