= Isona Passola =

Spanish film director and producer

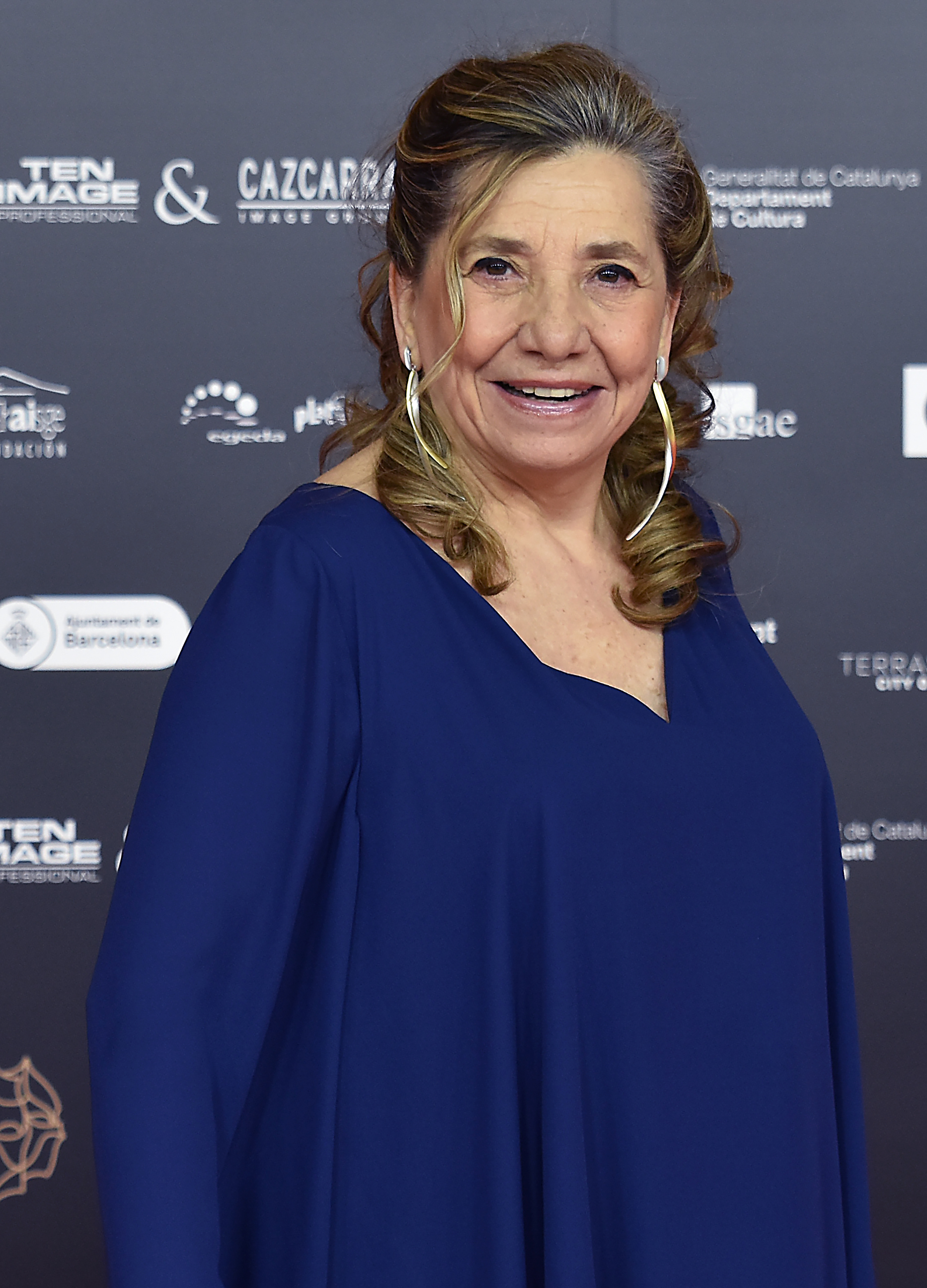
Isona Passola i Vidal in 2021

Isona Passola i Vidal is a film producer, screenwriter and director from Barcelona. She is the current president of the Catalan Film Academy. She is known for the films Black Bread (Pa Negre, 2011) and Uncertain Glory (Incerta Glòria, 2017), directed by the Mallorcan director Agustí Villaronga, as well as for her social and political documentaries such as Cataluña-Espanya (2009) or L'endemà (2014), both directed by herself.
