= List of Spanish films of 2022 =

A list of Spanish-produced and co-produced feature films released in Spain in 2022. When applicable, the domestic theatrical release date is favoured.

The crop was hailed as one of the strongest for Spanish cinema in recent years. Domestic box-office gross for Spanish films roughly doubled 2021 figures up to €82 million, but still remained below pre-pandemic standards.

== Films ==
Release		Title (Domestic title)	Cast & Crew	Distribution label	Ref.
J A N U A R Y	6	The Wasteland (El páramo)	Director: David Casademunt Cast: Inma Cuesta, Roberto Álamo, Asier Flores, Alejandra Howard	Netflix	
J A N U A R Y	21	Mi adorado monster	Director: Víctor Matellano	39 Escalones Films	
J A N U A R Y	28	The Grandmother (La abuela)	Director: Paco Plaza Cast: Almudena Amor, Vera Valdez	Sony Pictures	(Note: Co-production Spain–France (80%–20%).)
F E B R U A R Y	4	Petra de San José	Director: Pablo Moreno Cast: Marian Arahuetes, Roberto Chapu, Wendy Gara, Assumpta Serna	European Dreams Factory	
F E B R U A R Y	4	Through My Window (A través de mi ventana)	Director: Marçal Fores Cast: Clara Galle, Julio Peña	Netflix	
F E B R U A R Y	11	Visitor (Visitant)	Director: Alberto Evangelio Cast: Iria del Río, Miquel Fernández, Jan Cornet, Sandra Cervera	Filmax	
F E B R U A R Y	18	The Passenger (La pasajera)	Director: Raúl Cerezo Cast: Ramiro Blas, Cecilia Suárez, Beatriz Olivares, Cristina Alcázar, Paula Gallego, Yao Yao	Karma Films	
F E B R U A R Y	25	Official Competition (Competencia oficial)	Director: Mariano Cohn, Gastón Duprat Cast: Penélope Cruz, Antonio Banderas, Oscar Martínez	Buena Vista International	(Note: Co-production Spain–Argentina (80%–20%).)
F E B R U A R Y	25	Tros	Director: Pau Calpe Cast: Roger Casamajor, Pep Cruz	Alfa Pictures	
F E B R U A R Y	25	La mancha negra	Director: Enrique García Cast: Pablo Puyol, Virginia DeMorata, Natalia Roig, Juanma Lara, Cuca Escribano	Marila Films	
M A R C H	11	Valley of the Dead (Malnazidos)	Director: Javier Ruiz Caldera, Alberto de Toro Cast: Miki Esparbé, Aura Garrido, Luis Callejo, Álvaro Cervantes, Jesús Carroza, María Botto	Sony Pictures	
M A R C H	11	Escape Room: La pel·lícula	Director: Héctor Claramunt Cast: Joel Joan, Mònica Pérez, Ivan Massagué, Paula Vives	Filmax	
M A R C H	18	Code Name: Emperor (Código Emperador)	Director: Jorge Coira Cast: Luis Tosar, Alexandra Masangkay, Georgina Amorós, Laura Domínguez, Miguel Rellán, María Botto, Arón Piper	A Contracorriente Films	
M A R C H	18	El mundo es vuestro	Director: Alfonso Sánchez Cast: Alberto López, Alfonso Sánchez, Teresa Arbolí, Carmen Canivell	eOne Films	
M A R C H	25	Beyond the Summit (La cima)	Director: Ibon Cormenzana Cast: Javier Rey, Patricia López Arnaiz, Blanca Apilánez, Kandido Uranga	Filmax	
M A R C H	25	What Lucía Saw (Llegaron de noche)	Director: Imanol Uribe Cast: Karra Elejalde, Juana Acosta, Carmelo Gómez	Karma Films	(Note: Co-production Spain–Colombia (78%–22%).)
M A R C H	25	Camera Café, la película	Director: Ernesto Sevilla Cast: Arturo Valls, Carlos Chamarro, Ana Milán, Carolina Cerezuela, Joaquín Reyes, Marta Belenguer , Alex O'Dogherty, Ingrid García Jonsson	Warner Bros. Pictures	
A P R I L	1	Monkey Business (Canallas)	Director: Daniel Guzmán Cast: Luis Tosar, Daniel Guzmán, Luis Zahera, Julián Villagrán, Miguel Herrán, Antonio Durán "Morris"	Universal Pictures	
A P R I L	1	Wandering Heart (Ámame)	Director: Leonardo Brzezicki Cast: Leonardo Sbaraglia, Miranda de la Serna, Eva Llorach	Vértigo Films	
A P R I L	8	Dancing on Glass (Las niñas de cristal)	Director: Jota Linares Cast: María Pedraza, Paula Losada, Mona Martínez, Marta Hazas, Ana Wagener, Olivia Baglivi, Juanjo Almeida	Netflix	
A P R I L	13	The Key Game (El juego de las llaves)	Director: Vicente Villanueva Cast: Eva Ugarte, María Castro, Tamar Novas, Miren Ibarguren, Fernando Guallar	Warner Bros. Pictures	
A P R I L	13	Counting Sheep (Contando ovejas)	Director: José Corral Llorente Cast: Eneko Sagardoy, Natalia de Molina, Juan Grandinetti	Filmax	(Note: Co-production Spain–Argentina (80%–20%).)
A P R I L	22	Venicephrenia (Veneciafrenia)	Director: Álex de la Iglesia Cast: Ingrid García Jonsson, Silvia Alonso, Goize Blanco, Nicolás lloro, Alberto Bang, Cosimo Fusco, Armando De Razza	Sony Pictures	
A P R I L	22	75 días	Director: Marc Romero Cast: Ana Fernández, Javier Albalá, Antonia San Juan, Macarena Gómez, Yohana Cobo	—N/a	
A P R I L	29	Alcarràs	Director: Carla Simón Cast: Jordi Pujol Dolcet, Anna Otín, Xenia Roset, Albert Bosch, Ainet Jounou	Avalon	(Note: Co-production Spain–Italy (80%–20%).)
A P R I L	29	Under Her Control (La jefa)	Director: Fran Torres Cast: Cumelén Sanz, Aitana Sánchez-Gijón	Filmax	
A P R I L	29	Honeymoon with My Mother (Amor de madre)	Director: Paco Caballero Cast: Quim Gutiérrez, Carmen Machi	Netflix	
M A Y	6	Culpa	Director: Ibon Cormenzana Cast: Manuela Vellés	No tan chalados	
M A Y	13	Unfinished Affairs (La maniobra de la tortuga)	Director: Juan Miguel del Castillo Cast: Natalia de Molina, Fred Tatien, Mona Martínez	A Contracorriente Films	(Note: Co-production Spain–Argentina (90%–10%).)
M A Y	13	Oliver's Universe (El universo de Óliver)	Director: Alexis Morante Cast: Rubén Fulgencio, María León, Salva Reina, Pedro Casablanc	Filmax	(Note: Co-production Spain–Romania–United States (70%–10%–20%).)
M A Y	13	They Carry Death (Eles transportan a morte)	Director: Helena Girón, Samuel M. Delgado Cast: Nuria Lestegás, Sara Ferro, Xoán Reices, Valentín Estévez	Begin Again Films	
M A Y	20	Lullaby (Cinco lobitos)	Director: Alauda Ruiz de Azúa Cast: Laia Costa, Susi Sánchez, Ramón Barea, Mikel Bustamante	BTeam Pictures	
M A Y	20	Mirror, Mirror (Espejo, espejo)	Director: Marc Crehuet Cast: Santi Millán, Natalia de Molina, Malena Alterio, Carlos Areces, Carlos Bardem	Filmax	
M A Y	27	The Dinner Guest (El comensal)	Director: Ángeles González Sinde Cast: Susana Abaitua, Ginés García Millán, Adriana Ozores, Fernando Oyagüez, David Luque	A Contracorriente Films	
M A Y	27	En otro lugar	Director: Jesús del Cerro Cast: Miguel Ángel Muñoz, Esmeralda Pimentel, Pablo Puyol	—N/a	
M A Y	27	Skin in Flames (La piel en llamas)	Director: David Martín-Porras Cast: Óscar Jaenada, Lidia Nené, Ella Kweku, Fernando Tejero	—N/a	
M A Y	27	Toscana	Director: Pau Durà Cast: Pau Durà, Eduard Soto, Malena Alterio, Francesc Orella	Alfa Pictures	
M A Y	27	Costa Brava, Lebanon (Costa Brava, Líbano)	Director: Mounia Akl Cast: Nadine Labaki, Yumna Marwan, Saleh Bakri, Nadia Chancel	Avalon	
J U N E	3	Can't Live Without You (Sin ti no puedo)	Director: Chus Gutiérrez Cast: Maite Perroni, Mauricio Ochmann, Alfonso Bassave, Pedro Casablanc, Elena Irureta	Filmax	(Note: Co-production Spain–Mexico (80%–20%).)
J U N E	3	The Gentiles (Las gentiles)	Director: Santiago Amodeo Cast: África de la Cruz, Paula Díaz, Olga Navalón, Lola Buero, Alva Inger	Alfa Pictures	
J U N E	3	Live Is Life	Director: Dani de la Torre	Warner Bros. Pictures	
J U N E	10	The Volunteer (La voluntaria)	Director: Nely Reguera Cast: Carmen Machi, Itsaso Arana, Arnau Comas, Dèlia Brufau	BTeam Pictures	
J U N E	17	You Have to Come and See It (Tenéis que venir a verla)	Director: Jonás Trueba Cast: Itsaso Arana, Vito Sanz, Francesco Carril, Irene Escolar	Atalante	
J U N E	17	We Won't Kill Each Other with Guns (Nosaltres no ens matarem amb pistoles)	Director: María Ripoll Cast: Ingrid García-Jonsson, Elena Martín, Joe Manjón, Lorena López, Carlos Troya	Filmax	
J U N E	24	Full of Grace (Llenos de gracia)	Director: Roberto Bueso Cast: Carmen Machi, Paula Usero, Pablo Chiapella, Nuria González, Anis Doroftei, Manolo Solo	Paramount Pictures	
J U L Y	1	Mom is Online (Mamá, no enRedes)	Director: Daniela Fejerman Cast: Malena Alterio, Eva Ugarte, Antonio Pagudo, Sofía Oria, Oscar Ortuño, Juan Grandinetti, Ben Temple, Antonio Garrido, María Castro	DeAPlaneta	
J U L Y	1	Pijamas espaciales	Director: Clara Martínez-Lázaro Cast: Mariona Terés, David Pareja	Elamedia	
J U L Y	1	Sinjar	Director: Anna Bofarull Cast: Nora Navas, Halima Ilter, Iman Ido Koro, Guim Puig	Filmax	
J U L Y	14	On the Edge (Entre la vida y la muerte)	Director: Giordano Gederlini Cast: Antonio de la Torre, Marine Vacth, Olivier Gourmet	Filmax	
J U L Y	14	Father There Is Only One 3 (Padre no hay más que uno 3)	Director: Santiago Segura Cast: Santiago Segura, Toni Acosta, Leo Harlem, Silvia Abril, Loles León	Sony Pictures	
J U L Y	22	HollyBlood	Director: Jesús Font Cast: Óscar Casas, Isa Montalbán, Jordi Sánchez	Filmax	
J U L Y	22	A Boyfriend for My Wife (Un novio para mi mujer)	Director: Laura Mañá Cast: Belén Cuesta, Diego Martín, Hugo Silva, Joaquín Reyes, Eric Masip, Ángela Cervantes	Universal Pictures	
J U L Y	29	Football Heroes of the Block (Héroes de barrio)	Director: Ángeles Reiné Cast: Antonio Pagudo, Luna Fulgencio, Álex O'Dogherty	A Contracorriente Films	
A U G U S T	12	Voy a pasármelo bien	Director: David Serrano Cast: Raúl Arévalo, Karla Souza, Dani Rovira	Sony Pictures	
A U G U S T	12	Very Bald Trip (Por los pelos)	Director: Nacho García Velilla Cast: Carlos Librado, Antonio Pagudo, Tomy Aguilera, Amaia Salamanca, Eva Ugarte	Warner Bros. Pictures	
A U G U S T	26	Tad, the Lost Explorer and the Emerald Tablet (Tadeo Jones 3. La tabla esmeralda)	Director: Enrique Gato	Paramount Pictures	
S E P T E M B E R	2	The Te$t (El test)	Director: Dani de la Orden Cast: Alberto San Juan, Miren Ibarguren, Blanca Suárez, Carlos Santos	Warner Bros. Pictures	
S E P T E M B E R	2	The Final Game (42 segundos)	Director: Dani de la Orden, Àlex Murrull Cast: Jaime Lorente, Álvaro Cervantes	Universal Pictures	
S E P T E M B E R	2	Pacifiction	Director: Albert Serra Cast: Benoît Magimel, Pahoa Mahagafanau, Marc Susini, Matahi Pambrun	Elastica	
S E P T E M B E R	9	The Chalk Line (Jaula)	Director: Ignacio Tatay Cast: Elena Anaya, Pablo Molinero, Carlos Santos, Eva Llorach, Esther Acebo, Eloy Azorín, Eva Tennear	Sony Pictures	
S E P T E M B E R	9	Dúo	Director: Meritxell Colell Cast: Mónica García, Gonzalo Cunill	Atalante	
S E P T E M B E R	9	My Emptiness and I (Mi vacío y yo)	Director: Adrián Silvestre Cast: Raphaëlle Perez	Filmin	
S E P T E M B E R	16	Dragonflies (Libélulas)	Director: Luc Knowles Cast: Milena Smit, Olivia Baglivi	Begin Again Films	
S E P T E M B E R	16	Two Many Chefs (La vida padre)	Director: Joaquín Mazón Cast: Karra Elejalde, Enric Auquer, Megan Montaner	Paramount Pictures	
S E P T E M B E R	16	The House Among the Cactuses (La casa entre los cactus)	Director: Carlota González-Adrio Cast: Ariadna Gil, Daniel Grao, Ricardo Gómez, Aina Picarolo, Zoe Arnao	Filmax	
S E P T E M B E R	23	Prison 77 (Modelo 77)	Director: Alberto Rodríguez Cast: Miguel Herrán, Javier Gutiérrez, Jesús Carroza, Catalina Sopelana, Xavi Sáez, Fernando Tejero	Buena Vista International	
S E P T E M B E R	23	Rainbow	Director: Paco León Cast: Dora Postigo, Áyax Pedrosa, Wekaforé Jibril, Carmen Maura, Carmen Machi, Luis Bermejo	Netflix	
S E P T E M B E R	30	The Rite of Spring (La consagración de la primavera)	Director: Fernando Franco Cast: Valèria Sorolla, Telmo Irureta, Emma Suárez	La Aventura	
S E P T E M B E R	30	Lost & Found (Objetos)	Director: Jorge Dorado Cast: Álvaro Morte, China Suárez, Verónica Echegui	Filmax	
S E P T E M B E R	30	Black Is Beltza II: Ainhoa	Director: Fermin Muguruza	Barton Films	
O C T O B E R	6	God's Crooked Lines (Los renglones torcidos de dios)	Director: Oriol Paulo Cast: Bárbara Lennie, Eduard Fernández, Loreto Mauleón, Pablo Derqui, Federico Aguado	Warner Bros. Pictures	
O C T O B E R	7	On the Fringe (En los márgenes)	Director: Juan Diego Botto Cast: Penélope Cruz, Luis Tosar, Juan Diego Botto, Adelfa Calvo, Aixa Villagrán, Font García, Nur Levi, Christian Checa	Vértice 360	
O C T O B E R	14	Piggy (Cerdita)	Director: Carlota Pereda Cast: Laura Galán, Richard Holmes, Carmen Machi, Pilar Castro, Irene Ferreiro, Camille Aguilar	Filmax	
O C T O B E R	14	Wild Flowers (Girasoles silvestres)	Director: Jaime Rosales Cast: Anna Castillo, Oriol Pla, Quim Àvila, Lluís Marqués	A Contracorriente Films	
O C T O B E R	14	Amazing Elisa (Asombrosa Elisa)	Director: Sadrac González-Perellón Cast: Asier Etxeandia, Silvia Abascal, Iván Massagué, Jana San Antonio	Alfa Pictures	
O C T O B E R	21	One Year, One Night (Un año, una noche)	Director: Isaki Lacuesta Cast: Nahuel Pérez Biscayart, Noémie Merlant, Quim Gutiérrez, Alba Guilera, Natalia de Molina	BTeam Pictures	
O C T O B E R	21	Unicorn Wars	Director: Alberto Vázquez	Barton Films	
O C T O B E R	21	The Man from Rome (La piel del tambor)	Director: Sergio Dow Cast: Richard Armitage, Amaia Salamanca, Fionnula Flanagan, Paul Guilfoyle, Rodolfo Sancho, Paul Freeman, Alicia Borrachero, Unax Ugalde	Flins y Pinículas	
O C T O B E R	21	Color of Heaven (El color del cielo)	Director: Joan-Marc Zapata Cast: Marta Etura, Francesc Garrido	Begin Again Films	(Note: Co-production Spain–Switzerland (75%–25%).)
O C T O B E R	28	Four's a Crowd (El cuarto pasajero)	Director: Álex de la Iglesia Cast: Blanca Suárez, Alberto San Juan, Ernesto Alterio, Rubén Cortada	Sony Pictures	
O C T O B E R	28	Edén	Director: Estefanía Cortés Cast: Charlotte Vega, Marta Nieto, Israel Elejalde, Ramón Barea	Syldavia	
N O V E M B E R	4	13 Exorcisms (13 exorcismos)	Director: Jacobo Martínez Cast: María Romanillos, José Sacristán, Ruth Díaz, Urko Olazabal	Beta Fiction	
N O V E M B E R	4	The Water (El agua)	Director: Elena López Riera Cast: Luna Pamies, Bárbara Lennie, Nieve de Medina, Alberto Olmo	Elastica	
N O V E M B E R	4	Staring at Strangers (No mires a los ojos)	Director: Félix Viscarret Cast: Paco León, Leonor Watling, Àlex Brendemühl, María Romanillos, Susana Abaitua, Juan Diego Botto, Marcos Ruiz	Universal Pictures	
N O V E M B E R	4	Vasil	Director: Avelina Prat Cast: Ivan Barnev, Karra Elejalde, Alexandra Jiménez, Susi Sánchez, Sue Flack	Filmax	(Note: Co-production Spain–Bulgaria (80%–20%).)
N O V E M B E R	4	Lugares a los que nunca hemos ido	Director: Roberto Pérez Toledo Cast: Belén Fabra, Francesc Corbera	Filmin	
N O V E M B E R	11	The Beasts (As bestas)	Director: Rodrigo Sorogoyen Cast: Denis Menochet, Marina Fois, Luis Zahera, Diego Anido	A Contracorriente Films	(Note: Co-production Spain–France (80%–20%).)
N O V E M B E R	18	Motherhood (La maternal)	Director: Pilar Palomero Cast: Carla Quílez, Ángela Cervantes	BTeam Pictures	
N O V E M B E R	18	The Three Wise Kings vs Santa (Reyes contra Santa)	Director: Paco Caballero Cast: Karra Elejalde, David Verdaguer, Matías Janick, Andrés Almeida, Adal Ramones, Eva Ugarte, Isa Montalbán, Cosette Silguero, Laura Quirós	Tripictures	
N O V E M B E R	25	Stories Not To Be Told (Historias para no contar)	Director: Cesc Gay Cast: Anna Castillo, Antonio de la Torre, Maribel Verdú, José Coronado, Quim Gutiérrez, Belén Cuesta, Javier Rey, Verónica Echegui, Àlex Brendemühl, María León, Chino Darín, Alejandra Onieva, Brays Efe, Alexandra Jiménez, Nora Navas	Filmax	
N O V E M B E R	25	Ramona	Director: Andrea Bagney Cast: Lourdes Hernández, Bruno Lastra, Francesco Carril	Filmin	
N O V E M B E R	30	A Man of Action (Un hombre de acción)	Director: Javier Ruiz Caldera Cast: Juan José Ballesta, Miki Esparbé, Luis Callejo	Netflix	
D E C E M B E R	2	Venus	Director: Jaume Balagueró Cast: Ester Expósito, Ángela Cremonte, Magüi Mira, Fernando Valdivieso, Federico Aguado	Sony Pictures	
D E C E M B E R	2	Cork (Suro)	Director: Mikel Gurrea Cast: Vicky Luengo, Pol López, Ilyass El Ouhdani	A Contracorriente Films	
D E C E M B E R	2	The Kids Are Alright 2 (A todo tren 2)	Director: Inés de León Cast: Paz Vega, Paz Padilla, Santiago Segura, Leo Harlem, El Cejas, Luna Fulgencio, Sirena Segura, Alan Miranda, Eneko Otero, Javier García, Verónica López	Warner Bros. Pictures	
D E C E M B E R	2	Tomorrow Is Today (Mañana es hoy)	Director: Nacho García Velilla Cast: Carmen Machi, Javier Gutiérrez, Asier Ricarte, Silvia Abril, Carla Díaz, Pepón Nieto, Marta Fernández Muro, Antonia San Juan	Prime Video	
D E C E M B E R	9	Manticore (Mantícora)	Director: Carlos Vermut Cast: Nacho Sánchez, Zoe Stein	BTeam Pictures	
D E C E M B E R	9	The Open Body (O corpo aberto)	Director: Ángeles Huerta Cast: Tamar Novas, Victória Guerra, María Vázquez, Federico Pérez, Elena Seijo, Miquel Insua	Filmax	
D E C E M B E R	9	15 Ways to Kill Your Neighbour (Pequeña flor)	Director: Santiago Mitre Cast: Daniel Hendler, Vimala Pons, Sergi López, Melvil Poupaud	Surtsey Films	(Note: Co-production Spain–France–Argentina–Belgium (10%–60%–20%–10%).)
D E C E M B E R	16	El sostre groc	Director: Isabel Coixet	BTeam Pictures	
D E C E M B E R	28	Inspector Sun and the Curse of the Black Widow (Inspector Sun y la maldición de la Viuda Negra)	Director: Julio Soto Gurpide	Tripictures	
D E C E M B E R	28	Todos lo hacen	Director: Martín Cuervo Cast: Salva Reina, Kira Miró, Carlos Santos, Mariam Hernández, Julián López, Andrea Duro, Macarena Gómez, Pablo Carbonell, Toni Acosta, Víctor Palmero	A Contracorriente Films	

== Box office ==
The ten highest-grossing Spanish films in 2022, by domestic box office gross revenue, were as follows:

Highest-grossing films of 2022
Rank	Title	Distributor	Admissions	Domestic gross (€)
1	Father There Is Only One 3 (Padre no hay más que uno 3)	Sony Pictures	2,707,038	15,606,842
2	Tad, the Lost Explorer and the Emerald Tablet (Tadeo Jones 3. La tabla esmeralda)	Paramount Pictures	2,031,800	11,802,930
3	God's Crooked Lines (Los renglones torcidos de Dios)	Warner Bros. Pictures	907,628	5,725,147
4	The Kids Are Alright 2 (A todo tren 2)	Warner Bros. Pictures	796,824	4,857,575
5	Four's a Crowd (El cuarto pasajero)	Sony Pictures	669,841	4,340,435
6	The Beasts (As bestas)	A Contracorriente Films	561,989	3,567,018
5	Alcarràs	Avalon	391,391	2,332,837
7	Prison 77 (Modelo 77)	Buena Vista International	387,774	2,121,540
8	Voy a pasármelo bien	Sony Pictures	360,169	2,096,725
10	Two Many Chefs (La vida padre)	Paramount Pictures	361,166	2,058,519

== See also ==
- 37th Goya Awards
- List of 2022 box office number-one films in Spain
