= Boré Buika =

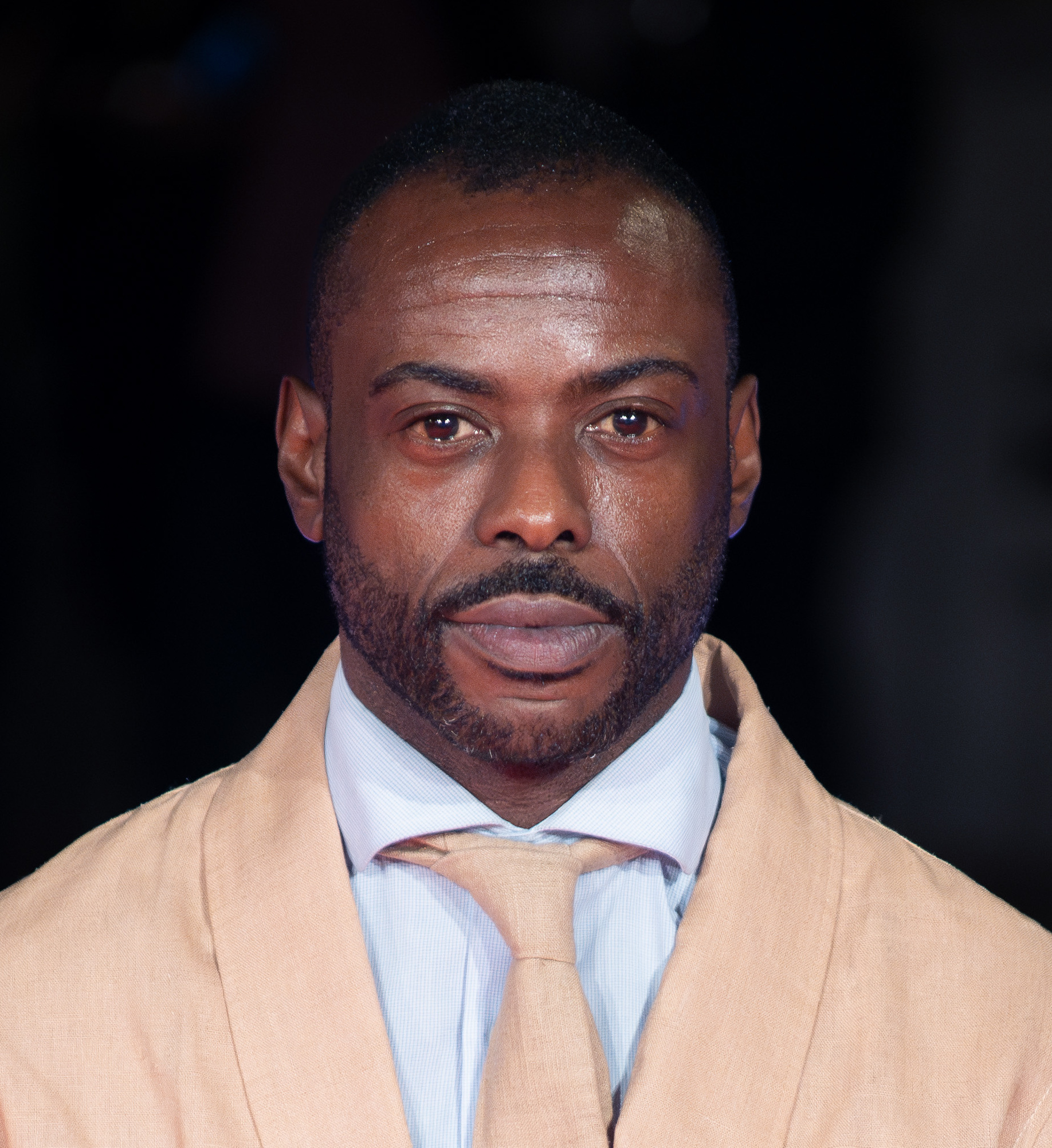
- Born: 12 August 1980 (age 45); Palma de Mallorca, Spain
- Occupation: Actor
- Relatives: Concha Buika (sister)

Boré Kaita Masa Buika (born 12 August 1980) is a Spanish actor of Equatorial-Guinean origin who became famous for his roles as Terence Wilder in El secreto de Puente Viejo and Teodoro Okenve in Mar de plástico.

== Biography ==
Buika was born on 12 August 1980 in the El Molinar neighbourhood of Palma de Mallorca. His relatives include his sister, singer Concha Buika, actor Armando Balboa Buika and politician Guillem Balboa Buika, the mayor of Alaró and the leader of the Més per Mallorca party. Boré became known through his work on the series Aída, where he participated in a chapter playing the role of Luisito during his adulthood during a flashback. A year later, he joined the daily series El secreto de Puente Viejo where he interpreted Terence Wilder, who causes a great furor in the population. Terence was the husband of Soledad Castro (Alejandra Onieva), who met him while travelling the world.

At the beginning of 2014, Buika left his role in the series following the departure of Onieva. In June 2015, he became part of the Telecinco series Anclados, alongside Rossy de Palma, Miren Ibarguren, and Fernando Gil, among others. He was present in its first and only season, playing a man named Obama.

With the cancellation of Anclados, he joined the cast of the new series by Antena 3, Mar de plástico, with Pedro Casablanc, Rodolfo Sancho, Belén López, and Lucho Fernández, along others. In it, he interpreted Teodoro Okenve, the brother of Fara (Yaima Ramos) and Khaled (Will Shepard). He later was present in the second season, but without Ramos. Some months later, he recorded a season in the La 1 series El Caso. Crónica de sucesos.

In 2016, Buika recorded his second film after Palm Trees in the Snow, titled Villaviciosa de al lado, with him working alongside actors and actresses such as Carmen Machi, Antonio Pagudo, Carmen Ruiz, Carlos Santos Rubio, and Belén Cuesta, among others. The film was directed by Nacho García Velilla. Two weeks after its premiere, it was confirmed that he would be present in the film Lord, Give Me Patience, alongside Jordi Sánchez, Silvia Alonso, and Megan Montaner, among others.

== Filmography ==
=== Television ===
Year	Title	Role
2012	Aída	Luisito de mayor
2013 - 2014	El secreto de Puente Viejo	Terence Wilder
2015	Anclados	Obama
2015 - 2016	Mar de plástico	Teodoro Okenve
2016	El Caso: Crónica de sucesos	Dylan Richardson
2017	El fin de la comedia	Camello 1
2018	Capítulo 0	Kan Lan
2019	Indetectables	
2020	Caronte	Adeyemi
2020 - 2021	Dos vidas	Mabalé
2021 - 2022	Élite	Sebastián Abaga
2022	Historias para no dormir	Naim
2022	Si lo hubiera sabido	Andrés
2023	La mesías	Francesc
2024	Serrines, madera de actor	Thornton
2025	Mar afuera	Fran

=== Films ===
Year	Title	Role
2004	El chocolate del loro	
2015	Palm Trees in the Snow	Gustavo
2016	Villaviciosa de al lado	Padre Benjamín
2017	Lord, Give Me Patience	Eneko
2017	The Lego Ninjago Movie	Cole (voice)
2019	4 latas	Sargento
2019	Los Japón	Tomi
2020	La lista de los deseos	Manu
2022	Vienes o voy	Hugo Durand
2023	Duchess	Jono

=== Short films ===
Year	Title	Role
2017	Princesa de hielo	Rey Baltasar
2018	Puteados por el mundo	Juanma

=== Theatre ===
- Clímax (2017–2019)
- The Curious Incident of the Dog in the Night-Time (2018)
- Tres sombreros de copa (2019)

== Awards and nominations ==
=== Spanish Union of Actors Awards ===
Spanish Union of Actors Awards
Year	Category	Work	Result
2015	Best Supporting Actor in a TV Series	El secreto de Puente Viejo	Nominated
