= María del Barrio =

Spanish actress

Maria del Barrio
- Born: Maria del Barrio Fernandez; July 5, 1989 (age 37); Madrid
- Occupation: Actress

María del Barrio is a Spanish actress born 5 July 1989 in the town of Alcalá de Henares, Madrid. She began her career at the age of 14 working with Sadrac González and Sonia Escolano in the short film: Mr. Long-Neck.

She also participated in plays such as Medea (2005) and Bodas de Sangre. She participated in the shooting of other short films such as Juliets, in which she played the role of a young girl with terminal cancer who had committed suicide.

In October 2008, del Barrio began filming her first feature film, Myna Has Gone, where she played a young undocumented immigrant who has a bitter experience, and which according to del Barrio, was extremely difficult due in part to the tough and controversial sex scene in the film, and required three months of rehearsals and psychological support. Myna se va won the "Narrative Feature Special Jury Recognition for Acting" at the 2009 Austin Film Festival. She also won the award for best actress in the Naperville Independent Film Festival.

In 2011 the film Myna has gone was released in theaters in the United States which include the cities of Minneapolis, Los Angeles, St. Louis, Phoenix, Houston, San Francisco, Dallas, Seattle, Miami, Denver, New York, and Palm Beach.

== Filmography ==
| Year | Film | Format |
|---|---|---|
| 2005 | El Señor Cuello-Largo | Short film |
| 2005 | Mr. Long-Neck | Short film |
| 2006 | Juliets | Short film |
| 2009 | Myna Has Gone | Feature film |
| 2010 | The vampire in the hole | Feature film |

== Awards ==
| Year | Film Festival | Award | Film |
|---|---|---|---|
| 2009 | Naperville Independent Film Festival | Best actress | Myna Has Gone |
| 2009 | Austin Film Festival | Special Jury Recognition for Acting | Myna Has Gone |
| 2009 | Zaragoza Film Festival | Special Jury Recognition for Acting | Myna Has Gone |
