= 25th Málaga Film Festival =

2022 film festival

- Official poster by Petra Eriksson
- Opening film: Code Name: Emperor
- Closing film: Full of Grace
- Location: Málaga, Spain
- Awards: Golden Biznaga (Lullaby and Utama)
- Festival date: 18–27 March 2022

Málaga Film Festival
- 2023 2021

The 25th Málaga Film Festival took place from 18 to 27 March 2022 in Málaga, Andalusia, Spain. Lullaby and Utama won the Golden Biznaga for, respectively, Best Spanish Film and Best Ibero-American Film.

== Background ==
Cecilia Suárez, Javier Cercas, Manuel Martín Cuenca, Marco Mühletaler, and Marta Nieto were selected as the jury of the main competition. The Zonazine competition jury consisted of José Rodríguez, Violeta Salama, and Maggie Civantos. The festival opening gala at Palacio de Deportes Martín Carpena on 18 March 2022 was hosted by Pepón Nieto, with Manolo García, Antonio Peula, Belén Bouzas, Pol Granch, Guitarricadelafuente and Camela as musical acts. The opening film was Code Name: Emperor. The official selection closed with the screening of Full of Grace on 26 March 2022. The closing gala was hosted by Fiorella Faltoyano.

== Festival slate ==
=== Official Selection ===
The official selection slate included the following films:

==== In competition ====
Highlighted title indicates section's best film winner.

English title	Original title	Director(s)	Production countrie(s)
Wandering Heart	Errante corazón	Leonardo Brzezicki	Argentina; Brazil; Spain; Chile; Netherlands
Cadejo blanco		Justin Lerner	Guatemala; United States; Mexico
A Mãe		Cristiano Burlan	Brazil
Monkey Business	Canallas	Daniel Guzmán	Spain
Lullaby	Cinco lobitos	Alauda Ruiz de Azúa	Spain
The Te$t	El test	Dani de la Orden	Spain
The Summit	La cima	Ibon Cormenzana	Spain
Unfinished Affairs	La maniobra de la tortuga	Juan Miguel del Castillo	Spain; Argentina
The Volunteer	La voluntaria	Nely Reguera	Spain; Greece
Dancing on Glass	Las niñas de cristal	Jota Linares	Spain
Libre		Natural Arpajou	Argentina
What Lucía Saw	Llegaron de noche	Imanol Uribe	Spain; Colombia
Lo invisible		Javier Andrade	Ecuador; France
Mensajes privados		Matías Bize	Chile
My Emptiness and I	Mi vacío y yo	Adrián Silvestre	Spain
We Won't Kill Each Other with Guns	Nosaltres no ens matarem amb pistoles	María Ripoll	Spain
The Gigantes		Beatriz Sanchís	Mexico; United States
Utama		Alejandro Loayza Grisi	Bolivia; Uruguay; France

==== Out of competition ====
English title	Original title	Director(s)	Production countrie(s)
Code Name: Emperor	Código emperador	Jorge Coira	Spain; France
Alcarràs		Carla Simón	Spain; Italy
Full of Grace	Llenos de gracia	Roberto Bueso	Spain

=== Zonazine ===
The zonazine selection featured the following films:

Highlighted title indicates section's best film winner.

English title	Original title	Director(s)	Production countrie(s)
A Vanishing Fog	Entre la niebla	Augusto Sandino	Colombia; Czech Republic; Norway
Dúo		Meritxell Colell	Spain
Una película póstuma		Sigfrid Monleón	Spain
Dragonflies	Libélulas	Luc Knowles	Spain
Isósceles		Ignacio Nacho	Spain
Lugares a los que nunca hemos ido		Roberto Pérez Toledo	Spain
The Shape of Things to Come	Tiempos futuros	Víctor Checa	Mexico; Peru; Ecuador; Spain; Germany
Mostro		José Pablo Escamilla	Mexico
Al Oriente		José María Avilés	Ecuador; Argentina

== Awards ==
Some of the main awards are presented as follows:

=== Official selection ===
Main competition

- Golden Biznaga for Best Spanish Film: Lullaby
- Golden Biznaga for Best Ibero-American Film: Utama
- Silver Biznaga, Special Jury Prize: My Emptiness and I
- Jury Special Mention: The Gigantes
- Silver Biznaga for Best Director: Alejandro Loayza Grisi (Utama)
- Silver Biznaga for Best Actress: Laia Costa & Susi Sánchez (Lullaby)
- Silver Biznaga for Best Actor: Leonardo Sbaraglia (Wandering Heart)
- Silver Biznaga for Best Supporting Actress: Debora Maria da Silva (A Mãe)
- Silver Biznaga for Best Supporting Actor: Nicolás Poblete (Mensajes privados)
- Best Original Screenplay: Alauda Ruiz de Azúa (Lullaby)
- Best Original Score: Cergio Prudencio (Utama)
- Best Cinematography: Nicolás Wong Díaz (The Gigantes)
- Best Editing: Rodrigo Saquel (Mensajes privados)

Other

- Critics' Jury Award: Utama
- Audience Award: Lullaby

=== Zonazine ===
- Silver Biznaga to Best Spanish Film: Lugares la los que nunca hemos ido
- Silver Biznaga to Best Ibero-American Film: Mostro
- Best Director: Meritxell Colell (Dúo)
- Best Actress: Milena Smit & Olivia Baglivi (Dragonflies)
- Best Actor: Pepe Ocio & Sergio Torrico (Lugares la los que nunca hemos ido)
- Audience Award: Dragonflies

=== Myscellaneous ===
- Feroz Puerta Oscura Award: Lullaby
- SIGNIS Award: Lullaby
