= Perfect Life (TV series) =

Spanish comedy television series

- Spanish: Vida perfecta
- Genre: Comedy; Dramedy
- Created by: Leticia Dolera
- Written by: Leticia Dolera; Manuel Burque
- Directed by: Ginesta Guindal; Leticia Dolera; Elena Martín; Lucía Alemany; Irene Moray
- Starring: Leticia Dolera; Celia Freijeiro; Aixa Villagrán
- Country of origin: Spain
- Original language: Spanish
- No. of seasons: 2
- No. of episodes: 14

Production
- Running time: 25 min (approx.)
- Production companies: Movistar+; Corte y Confección de Películas

Original release
- Network: Movistar+
- Release: 18 October 2019 – 19 November 2021

Perfect Life (Spanish: Vida perfecta) is a Spanish comedy television series, created by Leticia Dolera for Movistar+. The first season was fully released on the latter platform on 19 October 2019, whereas the second and last season was released on 19 November 2021.

== Premise ==
The fiction follows three women in their thirties: Cris, Esther and María, facing different life situations and eventually coming to rethink their pre-established ideas.

== Cast ==
Leads

- Celia Freijeiro as Cris
- Leticia Dolera as María
- Aixa Villagrán as Esther

Other

- Enric Auquer as Gari.
- David Verdaguer as Gustavo.
- Manuel Burque as Xosé.
- Font García as Pablo.
- Carmen Machi as María del Pilar.
- Fernando Colomo as José Antonio.
- Pedro Casablanc as Ricardo.
- Ángela Cervantes as Ro.

== Production and release ==
Created by Leticia Dolera, the series was written by Dolera together with Manuel Burque, whereas it was directed by Dolera together with Ginesta Guindal and Elena Martín. It was co-produced by Movistar+ and Corte y Confección de Películas. The decision to remove actress Aina Clotet from the cast due to her pregnancy generated controversy and public scrutiny.

The first season, consisting of 8 episodes with a running time of about 25 minutes was fully released on Movistar+ on 18 October 2019. The production of a second season was subsequently announced in December 2019. In January 2021, HBO Max reached an agreement with Movistar+ to release the first season in the United States as well as to join the set of production companies of season 2, whose filming had ended by that time. Consisting of 6 episodes, season 2 was directed by Dolera together with Lucía Alemany and Irene Moray.

The first episode of season 2 was presented at the Iberseries Platino Industria festival in September 2021. The release date for the full final season (19 November 2021) was also announced.

Series	Episodes	Originally released	Network	Ref.
1	8	18 October 2019	Movistar+	
2	6	19 November 2021	Movistar+/HBO Max	

No. overall	No. in season	Title	Original release date
1	"Cuando no te dejas llevar"	18 October 2019	
2	"Cuando nada es lo que parece"	18 October 2019	
3	"Cuando tomas un camino inesperado"	18 October 2019	
4	"Cuando te confiesas con tus padres"	18 October 2019	
5	"Cuando quieres y no puedes"	18 October 2019	
6	"Cuando no quieres estar sola"	18 October 2019	
7	"Cuando todo se derrumba"	18 October 2019	
8	"Cuando te dejas llevar"	18 October 2019	

== Awards and nominations ==
Year	Award	Category	Nominees	Result	Ref.
2020	7th Feroz Awards	Best Comedy Series		Won	
2020	7th Feroz Awards	Best Lead Actress in a TV Series	Leticia Dolera	Nominated	
2020	7th Feroz Awards	Best Supporting Actor in a TV Series	Enric Auquer	Won	
2020	7th Feroz Awards	Best Supporting Actress in a TV series	Celia Freijeiro	Nominated	
2020	7th Feroz Awards	Best Supporting Actress in a TV series	Aixa Villagrán	Nominated	
2020	7th Platino Awards	Best Actress in a Miniseries or TV series	Leticia Dolera	Nominated	
2020	70th Fotogramas de Plata	Best Spanish TV Series (according to readers)		Won	
2021	8th MiM Series Awards	Best Comedy Series		Nominated	
2021	8th MiM Series Awards	Best Screenplay	Leticia Dolera and Manuel Burque	Won	
2021	8th MiM Series Awards	Best Comedy Actor	Enric Auquer	Won	
2021	8th MiM Series Awards	Best Comedy Actress	Aixa Villagrán	Won	
