= Wandering Heart =

- Spanish: Errante corazón
- Directed by: Leonardo Brzezicki
- Written by: Leonardo Brzezicki
- Produced by: Violeta Bava; Rosa Martínez Rivero; Rodrigo Teixeira; Andrés Martín; Koji Nelissen; Derk Jan Warrink; Giancarlo Nasi; Leonardo Brzezicki
- Starring: Leonardo Sbaraglia; Miranda de la Serna; Eva Llorach; Iván Gónzález; Alberto Ajaka; Thalita Carauta; Tuca Andrada
- Cinematography: Pedro Sotero
- Edited by: Marta Velasco
- Music by: Nico Casal
- Production companies: Ruda Cine; RT Features; Vértigo Films; Quijote Films; Keplerfilm
- Release dates: 9 October 2021 (Argentina/Chile); 1 April 2022 (Spain)
- Countries: Argentina; Brazil; Spain; Chile; Netherlands
- Languages: Spanish; Portuguese

Wandering Heart (Spanish: Errante corazón; released in Spain as Ámame) is a 2021 internationally co-produced drama film written and directed by Leonardo Brzezicki which stars Leonardo Sbaraglia alongside Miranda de la Serna and Eva Llorach. It is a co-production by companies from Argentina, Brazil, Spain, Chile, and the Netherlands.

== Plot ==
After a breakup, embittered homosexual father Santiago takes his teenage daughter Laila—whom with he has toxic relationship—with him, spending a chaotic summertime across Argentina and Brazil.

== Cast ==
- Leonardo Sbaraglia as Santiago
- Miranda de la Serna as Laila
- Eva Llorach as Eloísa
- Iván González as Federico
- Alberto Ajaka as Luis
- Thalita Carauta as Júlia
- Tuca Andrada as Silvio

== Production ==
Wandering Heart is an Argentine-Brazilian-Spanish-Chilean-Dutch international co-production by Ruda Cine, RT Features, Vértigo Films, Quijote Films and Keplerfilm. It was shot in between Buenos Aires and Rio de Janeiro.

== Release ==
The film was released directly on HBO Max in Argentina on 9 October 2021. It received a theatrical release at Buenos Aires' Cine Gaumont on 14 October 2021. The film screened at the 26th Queer Lisboa International Queer Film Festival on 18 September 2022. It was released theatrically in Spain on 1 April 2022 under the title Ámame by Vértigo.

== Reception ==
Alfonso Rivera of Cineuropa considered that while the film's premise "is not particularly original" and "some of the characters can end up seeming excessively distraught and querulous", its lead actor manages to pull off a "miracle" by never ceasing to fascinate the audience with the portrayal of a "romantic, lonesome animal in pain".

Javier Ocaña of El País wrote that the helmer moves his gaze (and the camera) around an "immense actor in a state of grace" [portraying] a character who could well be the same one as [Sbaraglia's] in Pain and Glory.

Reviewing for the International Cinephile Society, Matthew Joseph Jenner rated the film 4 out of 5 stars, deeming it to be "a compassionate and poignant immersion into the lives of these characters as they voyage through the world, unearthing its secrets and embracing its unconventional nature".

== Accolades ==
| Year | Award | Category | Nominee(s) | Result | Ref. |
|---|---|---|---|---|---|
| 2022 | 25th Málaga Film Festival | Silver Biznaga for Best Actor | Leonardo Sbaraglia | Won | |
| 2022 | 16th Sur Awards | Best Director | Leonardo Brzezicki | Nominated | |
| 2022 | 16th Sur Awards | Best Original Screenplay | Leonardo Brzezicki | Nominated | |
| 2022 | 16th Sur Awards | Best Actor | Leonardo Sbaraglia | Won | |
| 2022 | 16th Sur Awards | Best New Actress | Miranda de la Serna | Won | |
| 2022 | 16th Sur Awards | Best Makeup | Dolores Giménez | Nominated | |
| 2022 | 70th Silver Condor Awards | Best Original Screenplay | Leonardo Brzezicki | Nominated | |
| 2022 | 70th Silver Condor Awards | Best Actor | Leonardo Sbaraglia | Won | |
| 2022 | 70th Silver Condor Awards | Best Supporting Actress | Miranda de la Serna | Nominated | |
| 2022 | 70th Silver Condor Awards | Best Supporting Actor | Alberto Ajaka | Nominated | |
| 2022 | 70th Silver Condor Awards | Best Original Music | Nico Casal | Nominated | |

== See also ==
- List of Argentine films of the 2020s
- List of Brazilian films of the 2020s
- List of Spanish films of 2022
