= What Lucía Saw =

- Theatrical release poster
- Spanish: Llegaron de noche
- Directed by: Imanol Uribe
- Written by: Daniel Cebrián
- Produced by: María Luisa Gutiérrez; Gerardo Herrero
- Starring: Juana Acosta; Juan Carlos Martínez; Carmelo Gómez; Karra Elejalde
- Cinematography: Kalo Berridi
- Edited by: Teresa Font
- Music by: Vanessa Garde
- Production companies: Bowfinger International Pictures; Tornasol Media; Nunca digas nunca AIE; 64A Films
- Distributed by: Karma Films (es)
- Release dates: 21 March 2022 (Málaga); 25 March 2022 (Spain)
- Countries: Spain; Colombia
- Language: Spanish

What Lucía Saw (Spanish: Llegaron de noche; transl. 'They Came by Night') is a 2022 Spanish-Colombian drama film directed by Imanol Uribe which stars Juana Acosta, Juan Carlos Martínez, Carmelo Gómez and Karra Elejalde. It is a dramatization of the 1989 murders of Jesuits in El Salvador by the Salvadoran Army.

== Plot ==
The plot follows the Central American University's cleaning staff Lucía Barrera de Cerna, a witness of the massacre of the 1989 murders of Jesuits in El Salvador by the Salvadoran Army, who stood up for truth and refused to cover up the responsibility of the military with the fake attribution of the crime to the FMLN guerrilla by the Salvadoran government, in the midst of the Salvadoran Civil War.

== Cast ==
- Juana Acosta as Lucía Barrera de Cerna
- Juan Carlos Martínez
- Carmelo Gómez as Padre Tojeira
- Karra Elejalde as Ignacio Ellacuría
- Ben Temple as Father Tipton
- Angel Bonanni
- Manu Fullola
- Rodrigo Villagrán
- Cristhian Esquivel
- Gerald B. Fillmore
- Eric Francés
- José Roberto Díaz
- Ernesto Collado as Father Nachito
- Julio Pachón as Colonel López

== Production ==
The film was originally known as La mirada de Lucía (transl. Lucía's gaze) early in the production stage. The screenplay was penned by Daniel Cebrián. The film was produced by Bowfinger International Pictures, Tornasol Media and Nunca digas nunca AIE alongside 64A Films, and it had the participation of RTVE and Movistar+ and support from ICAA, the Ibermedia programme and ICO. Shooting began by November 2020 in Navarre. It later moved to Colombia, shooting in Valle del Cauca in between Cali and Buga.

== Release ==
The film was presented on 21 March 2022 at the 25th Málaga Film Festival, as part of the festival's main competition. Distributed by Karma Films, it opened in Spanish theatres on 25 March 2022.

== Reception ==
Sergio F. Pinilla of Cinemanía rated the film with 4 out of 5 stars, underscoring that Acosta shines in Uribe's return to political thriller.

Juan Pando of Fotogramas gave it 3 out of 5 stars, highlighting "the innocence of the protagonist in the face of the surrounding horror", while considering that the negative characters were not sufficiently humanised as a drawback.

Manuel J. Lombardo of Diario de Sevilla gave a negative review and 2 stars, deeming the film, weighed down by several bad decisions, to be a "discursive, superficial, leaden work", "with no real context, political bite nor dramatic tension".

Jonathan Holland of ScreenDaily deemed What Lucía Saw to be a "well-intentioned but uneven" film, pointing out that some people will wonder "how it is possible to extract so little tension from such a subject".

== See also ==
- List of Spanish films of 2022
