= The Platform 2 =

2024 film by Galder Gaztelu-Urrutia

- Promotional release poster
- Spanish: El hoyo 2
- Directed by: Galder Gaztelu-Urrutia
- Written by: David Desola; Pedro Rivero; Galder Gaztelu-Urrutia; Egoitz Moreno
- Produced by: Carlos Juárez; Raquel Perea
- Starring: Hovik Keuchkerian; Milena Smit
- Cinematography: Jon Sangroniz
- Edited by: Haritz Zubillaga
- Music by: Aitor Etxebarria
- Production company: Basque Films
- Distributed by: Netflix
- Release dates: September 27, 2024 (Zinemaldia); October 4, 2024 (Spain)
- Running time: 101 minutes
- Country: Spain
- Language: Spanish

The Platform 2 (Spanish: El hoyo 2, lit. 'The Hole 2') is a 2024 Spanish science fiction horror film directed by Galder Gaztelu-Urrutia. A prequel to Gaztelu-Urrutia's The Platform (2019), it stars Milena Smit and Hovik Keuchkerian. It was released on October 4, 2024 to mixed reviews.

== Plot ==
A woman named Perempuán is inside a vertical prison with 333 floors, with one cell per floor, two people per cell, and a hole running down the center of the entire structure. Each day, a platform loaded with food descends, stopping briefly at each level. Prisoners on higher floors have first access to the food, while those on lower levels risk starvation. At the end of each month, prisoners are randomly reassigned to new floors. Before entering, each inmate is interviewed and chooses one kind of food, which might be provided each day. Each prisoner is allowed to bring one personal item with them.

Perempuán and a large, imposing man named Zamiatin are placed together on level 24. Robespierre, a Loyalist from the level above, introduces them to the informal system currently operating in the prison. Two factions exist: Loyalists, who follow strict, self-imposed rules about eating only their chosen food (or trading voluntarily), and Barbarians, who eat whatever they can grab. He argues that the law of the Loyalists ensures fairer food distribution.

Tensions quickly escalate when prisoners from higher levels eat food meant for others. A violent conflict erupts, resulting in deaths and injuries, and Robespierre ends up on their level. They learn from him about "The Messiah," a mythical figure who allegedly survived a month without food through meditation, then sacrificed his own leg to feed others on the lowest levels. His followers, known as the Anointed Ones, spread his message of the Loyalist laws. Robespierre then leaves on the platform, traveling downward to search for an Anointed One to fight Loyalists on a lower level.

As days pass, Zamiatin and Perempuán grow closer, sharing food and personal stories. It is revealed that Perempuán admitted herself to the prison out of grief after accidentally causing the death of her boyfriend's son, while Zamiatin claims to be a disillusioned mathematician. Zamiatin, in violation of the law, sometimes eats food of prisoners that have already died. Word of this spreads throughout the prison – to protect Perempuán from punishment for harboring him, Zamiatin sets himself on fire and jumps into the pit.

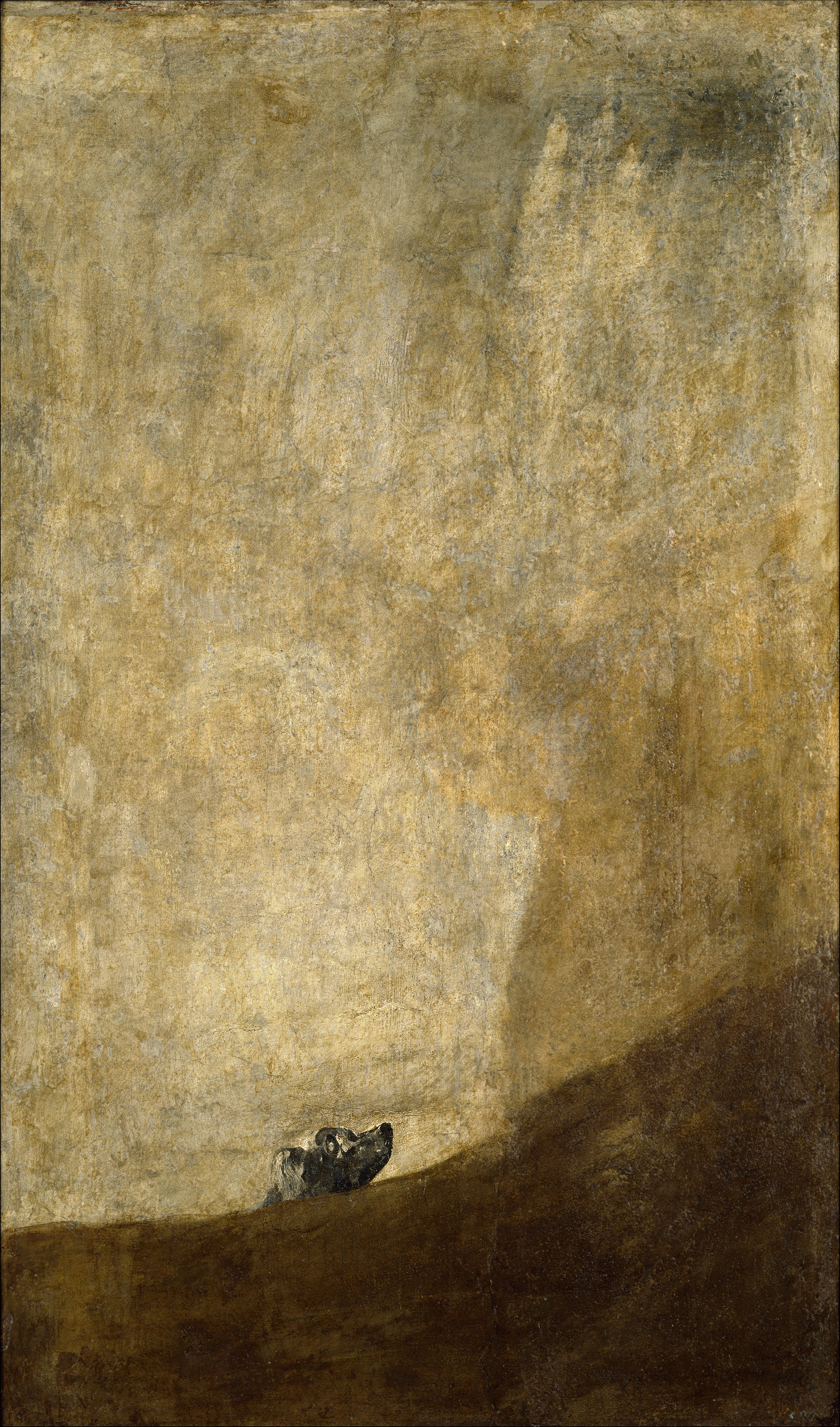
Goya's painting The Dog is used as a plot device.

The next month, Perempuán is paired with Sahabat on level 51. They step onto the platform and ride down multiple levels, in violation of the Law, to punish two Barbarians who have eaten the food of others. While talking to Sahabat that night, Perempuán learns about a particularly brutal Anointed One, Dagin Babi, who kills both Barbarians and Loyalists who make minor infractions. Sahabat plots to fake their deaths by consuming portions of an oil painting she has heard of, which contains a substance that will make them appear to die; she intends to do this during the end of month "reset", and escape while they are removing corpses. When Dagin arrives to punish them for disobeying the law, his followers kill Sahabat and cut off one of Perempuán’s arms.

The following month, Perempuán awakens on level 72 with Trimagasi. Perempuán recruits a group of Barbarians, ostensibly to challenge the Loyalists but in truth to find the painting. After the group descends multiple levels, she finds the painting; Dagin cuts off their food supply, and the Barbarians resort to cannibalism, although Perempuán abstains. A bloody battle ensues between the two groups, of which Perempuán and Trimagasi are the sole survivors.

Perempuán eats the painting. She passes out and awakens on level 333, bundled among corpses. Gravity is suspended as workers in gas masks reset the prison. She sees a young boy and forgoes her original plan in favor of saving him. In doing so, she encounters other prisoners living at the lower level, who convince her to send him back up while she remains below with them. Later, Perempuán reunites with Goreng, her boyfriend. (Note: At the end of the first film, Goreng sends a child he found on level 333 back to the top while remaining at the bottom, as Perempuán did. The last seconds of The Platform 2 show the exact next moment after the first film concluded.)

== Cast ==
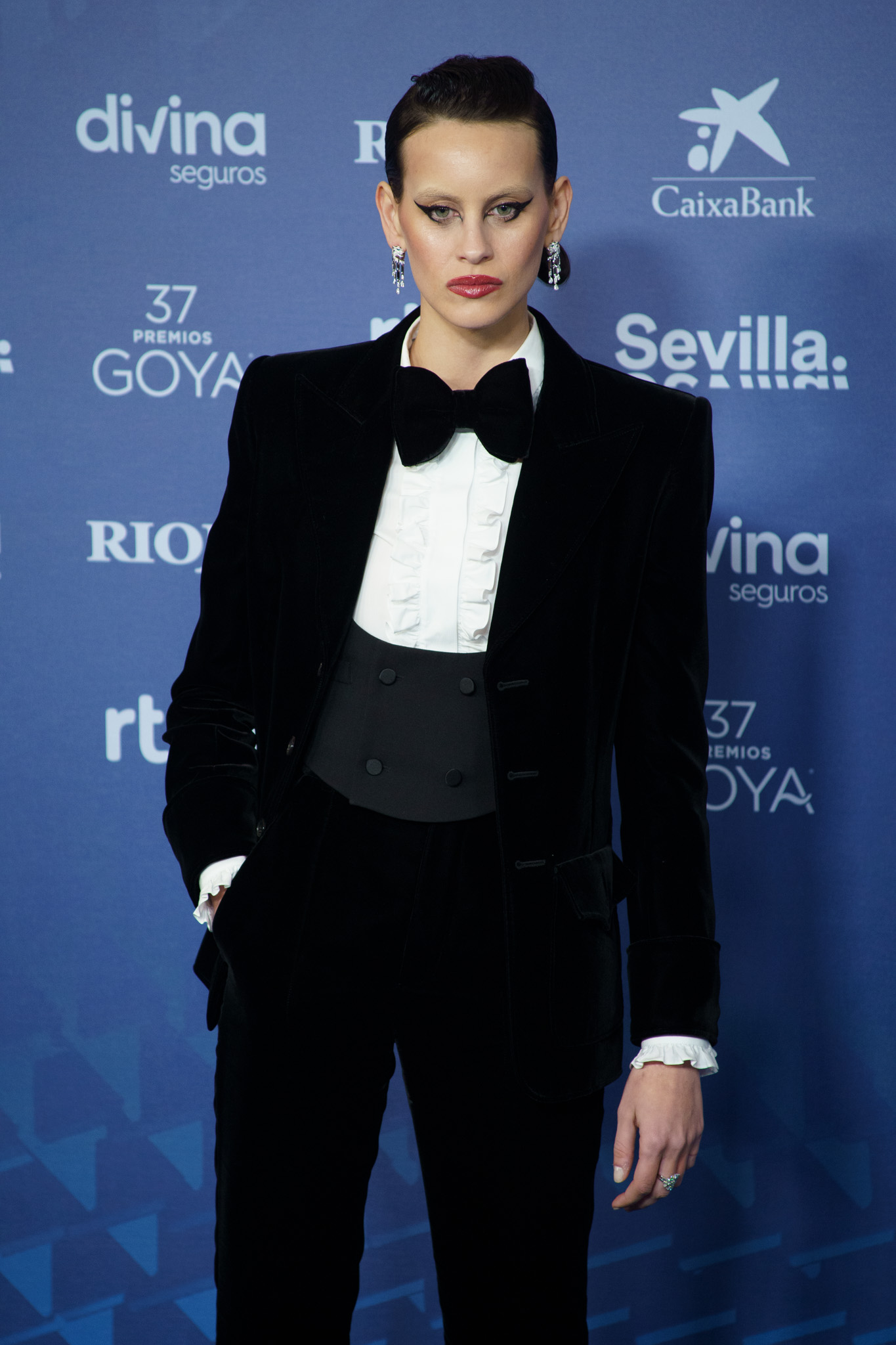
Milena Smit

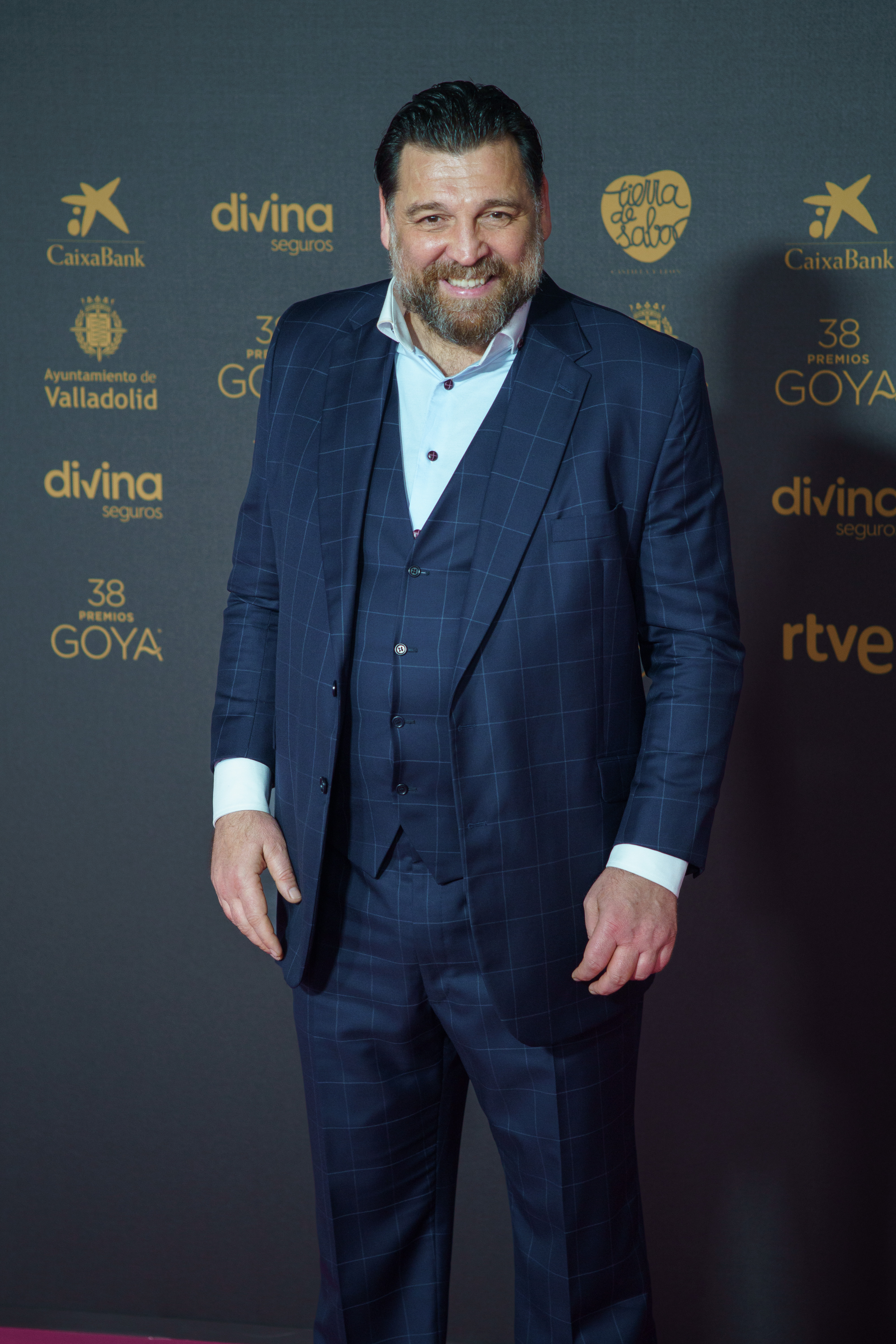
Hovik Keuchkerian

- Milena Smit as Perempuán
- Hovik Keuchkerian as Zamiatin
- Natalia Tena as Sahabat
- Óscar Jaenada as Dagin Babi
- Iván Massagué as Goreng
- Zorion Eguileor as Trimagasi
- Antonia San Juan as Imoguiri

== Production ==
The original film was released on Netflix in March 2020. Subsequently, the film received a surge in popularity during the COVID-19 pandemic and the company revealed the film had been watched by 56 million households over its first four weeks of release, among the most-ever for one of their original films.

Discussions of a sequel emerged shortly after the film's success in 2020. In May 2023, Netflix reported the beginning of filming of the follow-up with Galder Gaztelu-Urrutia returning as director and starring Hovik Keuchkerian and Milena Smit.

Shooting locations included the BEC in Barakaldo.

== Release ==
The film was selected for screening in the 'Culinary Zinema' section of the 72nd San Sebastián International Film Festival. It was released on Netflix on October 4, 2024.

== Reception ==
=== Critical response ===
On the review aggregator website Rotten Tomatoes, 36% of 25 critics' reviews are positive, with an average rating of 5.5/10. The website's consensus reads: "Grim and visually monotonous, The Platform 2 stands as an incoherent sequel that buries its compelling premise under dull symbolism, excessive gore, and a narrative that's hard to care about." Metacritic, which uses a weighted average, assigned the film a score of 45 out of 100, based on 7 critics, indicating "mixed or average" reviews.

In his review for The Guardian, Jesse Hassenger noted that while the film's "Grindhouse thought experiments" are engaging and suggest a stronger interest in speculative fiction than a singular thematic message, it ultimately falls short. He critiqued the film for moving too quickly and carelessly to develop its characters, stating that although Perempuán emerges as the lead and Smit performs well, the story lacks stability, constantly shifting beneath her. Hassenger gave the film two out of five stars.

Robert Daniels of RogerEbert.com delivered a scathing review of The Platform 2, criticizing the film for offering little beyond repeating the original. He argued that the movie quickly falls into rehashing the same "premonitions and metaphors" from its predecessor, even bringing back a character from the first film without adding anything new. Daniels went on to suggest that it might have been better if The Platform 2 had never been released, ultimately giving the film a rating of one and a half stars out of five.

David Ehrlich of IndieWire gave the film a 'C+' rating, writing that while there is enough "squelchy awfulness on display to keep horror fans engaged until the third act", the "film grows bored with the limits and implications of its own metaphor".

== See also ==
- List of Spanish films of 2024
