= Full of Grace =

- Theatrical release poster
- Spanish: Llenos de gracia
- Directed by: Roberto Bueso
- Screenplay by: Roberto Bueso; Óscar Díaz Cruz
- Produced by: Fernando Bovaira; Guillem Vidal-Folch
- Starring: Carmen Machi; Paula Usero; Anis Doroftei; Pablo Chiapella; Manolo Solo; Nuria González; Dairon Tallon; Adrián López; Pau Márquez; Adrián Marín; Diego Neira; Diego Muñoz; Divine Ogbebor; Víctor Pons; Álex Boquizo; Rubén Pons; Ignacio Blat
- Cinematography: Víctor Entrecanales
- Edited by: Jaime Colis
- Music by: Vicente Ortiz Gimeno
- Production companies: Misent Producciones; Mod Producciones; The Nun Producciones AIE
- Distributed by: Paramount Pictures
- Release dates: 27 March 2022 (Málaga); 24 June 2022 (Spain)
- Country: Spain
- Language: Spanish

Full of Grace (Spanish: Llenos de gracia) is a 2022 Spanish comedy film directed by Roberto Bueso. The cast features Carmen Machi, Paula Usero and Pablo Chiapella, among others.

== Plot ==
Set in 1994, with the backdrop of the 1994 FIFA World Cup, the plot tracks a nun who arrives to an orphanage about to close down (El Parral) and helps to create a football team among the kids.

== Cast ==
- Carmen Machi as Sister Marina
- Paula Usero as Sister Angelines
- Anis Doroftei
- Pablo Chiapella as Rafa
- Manolo Solo
- Nuria González as Mother Superior
- Dairon Tallon
- Adrián López
- Pau Márquez
- Adrián Marín
- Diego Neira
- Diego Muñoz
- Divine Ogbebor
- Víctor Pons
- Álex Boquizo
- Rubén Pons
- Ignacio Blat

== Production ==
The screenplay was penned by Roberto Bueso and Óscar Díaz Cruz. The film is a Misent Producciones, Mod Producciones and The Nun Producciones AIE production, with the participation of RTVE, Movistar Plus+ and À Punt Mèdia, funding from ICAA and Arcano Financiación Audiovisual and support from Institut Valencià de Cultura. It was shot in the Valencia Region, including Carcaixent, Burjassot, San Antonio de Benagéber, Quesa, Paterna, L'Eliana and Gandia.

== Release ==
Full of Grace was selected to screen out of competition as the closing film of the 25th Málaga Film Festival on 27 March 2022. Distributed by Paramount, the film was theatrically released in Spain on 24 June 2022.

It also screened at the 52nd Giffoni Film Festival in July 2022. ViX+ picked up rights for a streaming release in August 2022.

== Reception ==
Jonathan Holland of ScreenDaily considered the story to be "the very definition of good, old-fashioned fun", also featuring the central performance delivered by Machi which is "a joy to behold", underscoring that "despite some plot absurdities, the script is careful to keep things emotionally true".

Carlos Marañón of Cinemanía scored 3½ out of 5 stars, considering that the film ("as kind as it is funny") is supported by a "portentous" casting of youngsters making their debut in front of the camera.

Beatriz Martínez of El Periódico de Catalunya scored 3 out of 5 stars, considering that the film (featuring a good director and cast behind as well as a nostalgic element) manages to have "the right doses of spirit of improvement, good intentions and a little hope in human beings, which given the circumstances, we need".

== Accolades ==
Year	Award	Category	Nominee(s)	Result	Ref.
2022	52nd Giffoni Film Festival	Best Feature Film (elements +10)		Won	
2022	5th Berlanga Awards	Best Film		Nominated	
2022	5th Berlanga Awards	Best Director	Roberto Bueso	Nominated	
2022	5th Berlanga Awards	Best Screenplay	Roberto Bueso	Nominated	
2022	5th Berlanga Awards	Best Cinematography and Lighting	Víctor Entrecanales	Nominated	
2022	5th Berlanga Awards	Best Original Score	Vicente Ortiz Gimeno	Nominated	
2022	5th Berlanga Awards	Best Supporting Actress	Paula Usero	Nominated	
2022	5th Berlanga Awards	Best Production Supervision	Lorena Lluch	Won	
2022	5th Berlanga Awards	Best Costume Design	Giovanna Ribes	Won	

== See also ==
- List of Spanish films of 2022
