= The Snow Girl (TV series) =

Spanish mystery thriller television series

- Spanish: La chica de nieve
- Based on: La chica de nieve by Javier Castillo
- Written by: Jesús Mesas; Javier Andrés Roig
- Directed by: David Ulloa; Laura Alvea
- Starring: Milena Smit; José Coronado; Aixa Villagrán; Tristán Ulloa; Loreto Mauleón; Julián Villagrán; Raúl Prieto; Cecilia Freire
- Country of origin: Spain
- Original language: Spanish

Production
- Production company: Atípica Films

Original release
- Release: 27 January 2023

The Snow Girl (Spanish: La chica de nieve) is a Spanish mystery thriller television series based on the novel by Javier Castillo which stars Milena Smit.

== Plot ==
The plot tracks intern journalist Miren, set on finding the whereabouts of missing girl Amaya Martín, who disappeared during the 2010 Cavalcade of Magi in Málaga. Helped by veteran journalist Eduardo, she carries out a parallel investigation to inspector Belén Millán's.

== Cast ==
- Milena Smit as Miren Rojo
- José Coronado as Eduardo
- Aixa Villagrán as Belén Millán
- Tristán Ulloa as David Luque
- Loreto Mauleón as Ana Núñez
- Julián Villagrán
- Raúl Prieto as Álvaro Martín
- Cecilia Freire

== Production ==
Jesús Mesas and Javier Andrés Roig took over writing duties whereas David Ulloa and Laura Alvea directed the episodes. The series was produced by Atípica Films. It was shot in between Málaga and Madrid.

== Release ==
Netflix released the series on 27 January 2023.

== Accolades ==
Year	Award	Category	Nominee(s)	Result	Ref.
2023	25th Iris Awards	Best Fiction Screenplay	Jesús Mesas, Javier Andrés (based on the novel by Javier Castillo)	Nominated	
