= Monkey Business (2022 film) =

- Spanish: Canallas
- Directed by: Daniel Guzmán
- Screenplay by: Daniel Guzmán
- Produced by: Domingo Corral
- Starring: Joaquín González; Daniel Guzmán; Luis Tosar
- Cinematography: Ibon Antuñano
- Edited by: Pablo Marchetto; Miguel Sanz Esteso
- Music by: Alfred Tapscott
- Production companies: Movistar Plus+; El Niño Producciones; Zircocine; La Canica Films
- Distributed by: Universal Pictures International Spain
- Release dates: 19 March 2022 (Málaga); 1 April 2022 (Spain)
- Running time: 96 minutes
- Country: Spain
- Language: Spanish

Monkey Business (Spanish: Canallas, lit. 'Scoundrels') is a 2022 Spanish comedy film directed and written by Daniel Guzmán, who also stars alongside Joaquín González and Luis Tosar.

== Plot ==
The plot follows Joaquín, a go-getter living in Orcasitas with his mother, his daughter and his brother. Upon being handed a notice about the foreclosure of their apartment due to a loan, and teaming up with another two scoundrels from his past (Brujo and Luismi), Joaquín tries to get the money to avoid the eviction, but things go from bad to radically worse.

== Cast ==
- Joaquín González as Joaquín
- Daniel Guzmán as Brujo
- Luis Tosar as Luismi
- Luis Zahera
- Julián Villagrán
- Miguel Herrán
- Antonio Durán "Morris"

== Production ==
Penned by Guzmán (raised in Aluche), the screenplay fictionalizes the former's childhood friend Joaquín González (raised in Orcasitas). In addition to González, Guzmán and Tosar, the rest of the characters are played by a mix of a non-professional cast members (including González's family) as well as professional actors such as Luis Zahera, Julián Villagrán, Miguel Herrán, and Antonio Durán "Morris". The film was produced by Movistar Plus+ alongside El Niño Producciones, Zircocine and La Canica Films. Ibon Antuñano worked as director of cinematography.

== Release ==
The film premiered in the official selection of the 25th Málaga Film Festival on 19 March 2022. Distributed by Universal Pictures International Spain, it was theatrically released in Spain on 1 April 2022.

== Reception ==
Beatriz Martínez of El Periódico de Catalunya rated the film 3 out of 5 stars assessing that, taking advantage of the blurrying of the fictional and the real, the helmer manages to "generate a comic device that is much more precise than it might seem at first sight and that works (despite some drops in rhythm in its central part) in an unprejudiced and playful, parodic and self-conscious way".

Carlos Marañón of Cinemanía rated the film 3 out of 5 stars, considering that Guzmán is brave in daring to make "a personal story that maintains a complicated relationship with verisimilitude and yet has an undeniable connection to reality", with the narration being underpinned by a "Berlanguian" chorality.

Carmen L. Lobo of La Razón rated it 3 out of 5 stars, highlighting "the honesty and affection with which Guzman portrays these con artists", while pointing out that the film could have benefited from a final revision of its editing.

Josu Eguren of El Correo rated the film 2 out of 3 stars, deeming it to be "an honest and genuine film, with the flavor of the best popular cinema".

== See also ==
- List of Spanish films of 2022
