= Offside (2011 film) =

- Spanish theatrical release poster
- Spanish: En fuera de juego
- Directed by: David Marqués
- Screenplay by: Rafael Calatayud; Kiko Martínez
- Produced by: Kiko Martínez
- Starring: Fernando Tejero; Diego Peretti; José Sancho; Hugo Silva; Carolina Peleritti; Laura Pamplona; Carlos Chamarro; Chino Darín; Carmen Ruiz; Jordi Sánchez; Patricia Montero
- Cinematography: Federico Ribes
- Edited by: Iván Aledo
- Music by: Nacho Mañó; Nico Cota
- Production companies: Nadie es Perfecto PC; Dos Medidas; Royal Cinema Group
- Release dates: 1 April 2011 (Málaga); 1 June 2012 (Spain); 14 June 2012 (Argentina)
- Countries: Spain; Argentina
- Language: Spanish

Offside (Spanish: En fuera de juego) is a 2011 Spanish Argentine comedy film directed by David Marqués from a screenplay by Rafael Calatayud and Kiko Martínez which stars Fernando Tejero and Diego Peretti.

== Plot ==
Sleazy third division football agent Javi comes across football-hating physician Diego Garrido (forced to pose as an agent and to travel from Argentina to Madrid), uneasily joining forces to manage the affairs of 17-year-old Argentine football prodigy Gustavo César.

== Cast ==
- Fernando Tejero as Javi
- Diego Peretti as Diego Garrido
- Chino Darín as Gustavo César
- Patricia Montero as Lourdes
- Pepe Sancho as don Julio
- Hugo Silva as Hugo
- Laura Pamplona as Gemma
- Carolina Peleritti as Ana
- Carmen Ruiz as Mónica
- Ricardo Darín as Coco
- Carlos Chamarro as López

Football personalities Iker Casillas, Martín Palermo, José Ramón de la Morena, Manolo Esteban, and Manuel Llorente feature in cameo roles.

== Production ==
The film is a Nadie es Perfecto PC, Dos Medidas, and Royal Cinema Group production. Shooting locations included Barcelona, Madrid, Buenos Aires, and Valencia.

== Release ==
The film was presented at the Málaga Film Festival in April 2011. It also screened at the Montpellier Mediterranean Film Festival (Cinemed) in October 2011.

== Reception ==
Pere Vall of Fotogramas rated the film 3 out of 5 stars, highlighting the head-to-head between Tejero and Peretti as the best thing about the film.

== See also ==
- List of Spanish films of 2012
- List of Argentine films of 2012
