= The Test (2022 film) =

- Theatrical release poster
- Spanish: El test
- Directed by: Dani de la Orden
- Screenplay by: Jordi Vallejo
- Based on: El test by Jordi Vallejo
- Produced by: Mercedes Gamero; Eduardo Campoy
- Starring: Alberto San Juan; Blanca Suárez; Miren Ibarguren; Carlos Santos
- Cinematography: Pau Muñoz
- Edited by: Oriol Pérez Alcaraz
- Music by: Fernando Velázquez
- Production companies: Atresmedia Cine; Warner Bros. Entertainment España; Álamo Producciones Audiovisuales
- Distributed by: Warner Bros. Pictures España
- Release dates: 19 March 2022 (Málaga); 2 September 2022 (Spain)
- Country: Spain
- Language: Spanish

The Te$t (Spanish: El test) is a 2022 Spanish comedy film directed by Dani de la Orden and written by Jordi Vallejo which stars Alberto San Juan, Miren Ibarguren, Carlos Santos, and Blanca Suárez.

== Plot ==
The fiction follows a financially-strained married couple (Héctor and Paula) who are offered a bargain by Toni, a rich friend of theirs: €100,000 upfront or €1,000,000 ten years from now. Héctor favours the former option whilst Paula prefers to wait, but they need to reach a common stance.

== Cast ==
- Carlos Santos as Héctor
- Miren Ibarguren as Paula
- Alberto San Juan as Toni
- Blanca Suárez as Berta
- Antonio Resines
- Luna Fulgencio

== Production ==
Based on the stage play of the same name written by Jordi Vallejo, the screenplay was adapted by Vallejo himself. The film is an Atresmedia Cine, Warner Bros. Pictures España and Álamo Producciones Audiovisuales production.

== Release ==
The film was presented on 19 March 2022 at the 25th Málaga Film Festival, included in the festival's official selection. Distributed by Warner Bros. Pictures España, it was theatrically released in Spain on 2 September 2022.

== Reception ==
Juan Pando of Fotogramas rated the film 4 out of 5 stars, highlighting "the wonderful ironic tone that it maintains" as the best thing about it.

Javier Escribano of HobbyConsolas rated the film 70 out of 100 points ("good"), deeming it to be "very entertaining and easy to watch movie, light but also interesting and thought-provoking at the same time", while pointing out that the story becomes predictable towards the end, and that Resines' character has no place as a comic relief as negative points.

Santiago Alverú of Cinemanía rated the film 3 out of 5 stars, regretting that by the time the viewer gets attached to the three lead characters "magnificently" played by San Juan, Ibarguren and Santos, Suárez's character bursts in with a different tone, unbalancing the whole.

== See also ==
- List of Spanish films of 2022
