= Matadero =

- Genre: Crime drama Black comedy
- Created by: Daniel Martín Sáez de Parayuelo
- Written by: Daniel Martín Sáez de Parayuelo, Laura Sarmiento, Fernando Navarro, Nacho Cabana, Chus Vallejo
- Directed by: Daniel Martín Sáez de Parayuelo; Jordi Frades; Joan Noguera; Montse García
- Starring: Pepe Viyuela; Lucía Quintana; Antonio Garrido; Tito Valverde; Carmen Ruiz; Ginés García Millán; Miguel de Lira; Filipe Duarte; Marta Calvó; Camila Viyuela; Iván Cózar; Pep Ambròs; Julio Pereira; Janfri Topera; José Ángel Egido; Belén Constela
- Country of origin: Spain
- Original language: Spanish
- No. of seasons: 1
- No. of episodes: 10

Production
- Running time: 70 minutes
- Production company: Diagonal TV

Original release
- Network: Antena 3
- Release: 9 January – 13 March 2019

Matadero (English: Slaughterhouse) is a Spanish black comedy–crime drama limited television series created by Daniel Martín Sáez de Parayuelo and produced by Diagonal TV for Atresmedia. It premiered on Antena 3 on January 9, 2019 and ended on March 13, 2019

== Premise ==
In the small Castilian-Leonese town of Torrecillas, meat-processing businessman Francisco (Antonio Garrido) imports cheap and low-quality pigs from Portugal, some of which are used to smuggle cocaine. The veterinarian in his slaughterhouse is his brother-in-law Alfonso (Pepe Viyuela), a weak-willed man who is fed up of being blackmailed to look the other way and certify animals of dubious quality.

When Francisco's lover Coral organises the theft of the latest consignment of drug-smuggling pigs, she sets in motion a violent series of events. This entangles Pascual and Teo, a Murcian-Galician hitman duo, Vasco, a vengeful Portuguese gangster, Maria, Francisco's niece and a member of the Guardia Civil - and above all, Almudena, Francisco's wife, along with the hapless Alfonso.

Elsewhere, Alfonso's wife María José gets promoted in her sales company, under the watchful eye of her smarmy boss, Fermín, and Salvador, a local pig farmer and rival of Francisco's, seeks to win the heart of Almudena, the woman whom he has always loved,

== Cast ==
- Pepe Viyuela as Alfonso Cubillo
- Carmen Ruiz as María José Jiménez – Alfonso's wife
- Camila Viyuela as María Cubillo – Alfonso's daughter and a Guardia Civil
- Iván Cózar as Nuño – María's fiancé
- Antonio Garrido as Francisco
- Lucía Quintana as Almudena Jiménez – Francisco's wife
- Eduardo Antuña as Herminio – Francisco's employee
- Merjoddy Bermúdez as Coral – Francisco's lover
- José Ángel Egido as Don Julio – head of a Galician drug cartel
- Ginés García Millán as Pascual – a hitman working for Don Julio
- Miguel de Lira as Teo – Pascual's partner
- Gonzalo Uriarte as Da Silva – a Portuguese drug lord
- Filipe Duarte as Vasco – a Portuguese gangster working for Da Silva
- Julio Pereira as Fermín – María José's employer
- Tito Valverde as Salvador – a local farmer and rival of Francisco's
- Marta Calvó as Teresa – Salvador's wife
- Franky Martín as Ricardo – Salvador's son
- Janfri Topera as Capitán Villanueva – the head of the Guardia Civil
- Pep Ambrós as Jacobo – a member of the National Police Corps who grows close to María

== Episodes ==
Season	Episodes	Originally aired		Viewers (in millions)
Season	Episodes	First aired	Last aired	Viewers (in millions)
1	10	January 9, 2019	March 13, 2019	1.770 (12,1%)

=== Season 1 (2019) ===
No.	Title	Directed by	Original release date	Viewers (in millions) (share)
1	"El secreto del avestruz"	Jordi Frades	January 9, 2019	3.336 (21,6%)
2	"La maldición del vendedor de toallas"	Jordi Frades	January 16, 2019	2.434 (15,8%)
3	"Romance de las dos hermanas"	Joan Noguera	January 23, 2019	1.897 (12,9%)
4	"Segundas partes"	Joan Noguera	January 30, 2019	1.834 (12,5%)
5	"Sal del Himalaya"	Salvador García Ruíz	February 6, 2019	1.617 (10,5%)
6	"Romance de la loba parda"	Salvador García Ruíz	February 13, 2019	1.396 (9,8%)
7	"Decepciones"	Jordi Frades	February 20, 2019	1.357 (10,0%)
8	"La frontera no espera"	Joan Noguera	February 27, 2019	1.281 (9,0%)
9	"Mejor funcionario que millonario"	Salvador García Ruíz	March 6, 2019	1.254 (9,2%)
10	"El animal durmiente"	Jordi Frades	March 13, 2019	1.298 (10,1%)
