= Villaviciosa de al lado =

- Directed by: Nacho G. Velilla
- Written by: Oriol Capel; David S. Olivas; Antonio Sánchez; Nacho G. Velilla
- Produced by: Mercedes Gamero; Mikel Lejarza; Nacho G. Velilla
- Starring: Carmen Machi; Arturo Valls; Belén Cuesta; Macarena García; Leo Harlem; Jon Plazaola; Yolanda Ramos; Carmen Ruiz; Carlos Santos; Salva Reina; Goizalde Núñez; Antonio Pagudo
- Cinematography: Isaac Vila
- Edited by: Ángel Hernández Zoido
- Music by: Juanjo Javierre
- Distributed by: Warner Bros. Pictures
- Release date: 2 December 2016
- Country: Spain
- Language: Spanish

Villaviciosa de al lado is a 2016 Spanish comedy film written and directed by Nacho G. Velilla and starring an ensemble cast including Carmen Machi, Arturo Valls, Belén Cuesta and Macarena García.

== Plot ==
Luck seems to be smiling to the town of Villaviciosa de al Lado, as many people in the town have won a lottery prize. The happiness doesn't last, though, as the men bought the winning ticket at the local brothel, and can't cash it in because their wives would discover they have been there. Things take another turn for the worse when the local spa is forcefully closed due to some bad managing decisions from Anselmo, the town mayor, and many people start leaving Villaviciosa.

== Cast ==
- Carmen Machi as Mari
- Arturo Valls as César
- Belén Cuesta as Elisa
- Macarena García as Sole
- Leo Harlem as Anselmo
- Jon Plazaola as Carlos
- Yolanda Ramos as Visi
- Carmen Ruiz as Milagros
- Carlos Santos as Ricardo
- Salva Reina as Nino
- Goizalde Núñez as Carmen
- Antonio Pagudo as Juandi
- Boré Buika as Father Benjamín
- Julieta Serrano as Petra
- Tito Valverde as Augusto
- Miguel Rellán as Aurelio
- Florin Opritescu as Constantin
- Corina Randazzo as Merche
- Jorge Asín as Paco
- Toni Sevilla as Benito
