= Fine Arts (TV series) =

2024 Argentine-Spanish television series

- Spanish: Bellas artes
- Created by: Mariano Cohn Gastón Duprat
- Starring: Oscar Martínez; Aixa Villagrán; Koldo Olabarri
- Countries of origin: Argentina; Spain
- Original language: Spanish
- No. of seasons: 2

Original release
- Network: Star+ / Disney+
- Release: 11 April – 23 October 2024

Fine Arts (Spanish: Bellas artes) is an Argentine–Spanish comedy-drama television series created by Mariano Cohn and Gastón Duprat for Disney+, as part of the platform's original Spanish-language productions. Oscar Martínez stars as the conservative director of a museum of Latin American art in Madrid who finds himself at odds with the woke culture suffusing his field. As he grapples with his own views on what should or should not be considered art, he faces conflicts with museum employees and the progressive agenda of Spain's minister of culture. The supporting cast includes Dani Rovira, Aixa Villagrán, Koldo Olabarri, Ludwika Paleta.

The series was initially released on Star+ for Latin America and Spain on 11 April 2024. The second season was released on Disney+ on 23 October of the same year, Disney having discontinued the Star+ platform.
