= We Won't Kill Each Other with Guns =

- Film poster
- Catalan: Nosaltres no ens matarem amb pistoles
- Spanish: Nosotros no nos mataremos con pistolas
- Directed by: Maria Ripoll
- Screenplay by: Víctor Sánchez Rodríguez; Antonio Escámez Osuna
- Based on: Nosotros no nos mataremos con pistolas by Víctor Sánchez Rodríguez
- Produced by: Lina Badenes; Belén Sánchez Silvero
- Starring: Lorena López; Carlos Troya; Elena Martín; Joe Manjón; Ingrid García-Jonsson
- Cinematography: Joan Bordera
- Edited by: Juliana Montañés
- Music by: Simon Smith
- Production companies: Un Capricho de Producciones; Turanga Films
- Distributed by: Filmax
- Release dates: 24 March 2022 (Málaga); 17 June 2022 (Spain)
- Country: Spain
- Languages: Catalan; Spanish

We Won't Kill Each Other with Guns (Catalan: Nosaltres no ens matarem amb pistoles; Spanish: Nosotros no nos mataremos con pistolas) is a 2022 Spanish comedy-drama film directed by Maria Ripoll which stars Lorena López, Carlos Troya, Elena Martín, Joe Manjón, and Ingrid García-Jonsson.

== Plot ==
Upon initiative from Blanca, a group of five friends in their 30s (completed by Miguel, Sigfrido, Elena, and Marina) meet again in town after years of not seeing each other.

== Cast ==
- Lorena López as Marina
- Carlos Troya as Sigfrido
- Elena Martín as Elena
- Joe Manjón as Miguel
- Ingrid García-Jonsson as Blanca

== Production ==
Penned by Víctor Sánchez and Antonio Escámez, the screenplay adapts Sánchez's play Nosotros no nos mataremos con pistolas. The film is a Turanga Films (Lina Badenes) and Un Capricho de Producciones (Belén Sánchez) production, with support from IVC, ICEC, TVC, À Punt Mèdia and IB3, and in association with AMC and Pasarela. It features dialogue in Catalan and Spanish. (Note: According to production company Un Capricho de Producciones, in a 55% (Catalan) – 45% (Spanish) basis.) It was shot in Sagunto and other locations in Camp de Morvedre, including Quartell, Almardá Beach, and Grau Vell.

== Release ==
The film made its world premiere at the 25th Málaga Film Festival on 24 March 2022. It also screened at the 6th BCN Film Fest in April 2022 for its Catalonia premiere. Distributed by Filmax, it was theatrically released in Spain on 17 June 2022.

== Reception ==
Júlia Olmo of Cineuropa pointed out that "on paper, the premise would appear interesting, as the starting point has great potential" but "the big problem with the film is that none of this goes beyond mere intentions" and the film gets "bogged down in platitudes, clichés and naivety – even triviality".

Elsa Fernández-Santos of El País, pointed that the film's flashes place it among the best of Ripoll's filmography while lamenting that final party's [poor] climax with "that beer commercial look", even though Ripoll gets it right with the tragicomic tone.

Beatriz Martínez of El Periódico de España rated the film 2 out of 5 stars, pointing out that "everything is too shallow" and the clichés "are difficult to overcome, although at least they are defended by a stupendous group of actors".

Sergio F. Pinilla of Cinemanía rated the film 3½ ouf ot 5 stars, determining that it "cunningly combines the nostalgic element, comedy and emotional thriller".

Raquel Hernández Luján of HobbyConsolas rated the film with 52 points ("so-so"), praising how it manages to portray "the disenchantment of an entire generation" and their structural problems, while negatively pointing out how "it does not delve into anything, it is impossible to empathize with the characters" and the viewing becomes a struggle.

== Accolades ==
Year	Award	Category	Nominee(s)	Result	Ref.
2023	15th Gaudí Awards	Best Film		Nominated	
2023	15th Gaudí Awards	Best Adapted Screenplay	Víctor Sánchez Rodríguez, Antonio Escámez Osuna	Nominated	

== See also ==
- List of Spanish films of 2022
