= Amazing Elisa =

- Theatrical release poster
- Spanish: Asombrosa Elisa
- Directed by: Sadrac González-Perellón
- Screenplay by: Sadrac González-Perellón
- Produced by: Diego Rodríguez; Ferran Tomàs
- Starring: Asier Etxeandia; Silvia Abascal; Iván Massagué; Jana San Antonio
- Cinematography: Iván Romero
- Edited by: Anaïs Urraca
- Music by: Pablo Carrascosa
- Production company: La Charito Films
- Distributed by: Alfa Pictures
- Release dates: September 2022 (FantasticFest); 14 October 2022 (Spain)
- Country: Spain
- Language: Spanish

Amazing Elisa (Spanish: Asombrosa Elisa) is a 2022 Spanish thriller drama film written and directed by Sadrac González-Perellón which stars Jana San Antonio as the title character alongside Silvia Abascal, Asier Etxeandia, and Iván Massagué.

== Plot ==
The plot follows Elisa, a 12-year-old girl coping with the trauma pertaining the death of her mother in a car accident. She tries to convince her sullen father Esteban that she has superpowers so she can exert revenge on those responsible for the tragedy. It also tracks the plight of the dysfunctional couple formed by Héctor and Úrsula, the former being a painter, and the latter a sexually-active woman adapting to her disability in the wake of the aforementioned accident. In addition, with the comic Elisa is obsessed with (Amazing Beatriz) as a connecting node, there is another parallel story plot featuring a costumed girl, who may or may not be the Beatriz from the comics.

== Cast ==
- Silvia Abascal as Úrsula
- Asier Etxeandía as Héctor
- Iván Massagué as Esteban
- Jana San Antonio as Elisa
- Milo Taboada
- Claudia Bouza
- Adrián de Núñez
- Mireia Rey
- Blanca Valletbò
- Alex Losada

== Production ==
Amazing Elisa is a La Charito Films production, and it had the participation of TV3. Shooting locations included Barcelona.

== Release ==
The film had its world premiere at the Austin-based Fantastic Fest in September 2022. It also made it to the main slate of the 55th Sitges Film Festival, where it was presented on 10 October 2022. Distributed by Alfa Pictures, it was theatrically released in Spain on 14 October 2022.

== Reception ==
Júlia Olmo of Cineuropa deemed the film to be "an interesting offering, that proposes a narrative of somewhat originality", yet failing to "strike the tone it aspires to and from which it feeds".

The review by Boquerini published in Las Provincias singled out Abascal's performance as the best thing about the film while citing the "poor fit" between the three subplots, which are "too dingy and obscure", as the worst thing about it.

Diego Cuevas of Jot Down, also pointed out the film's condition as heir to Vermut's film works, considering it to be simultaneously close and earthy as well as disturbing, underscoring that "playing with knives is risky, and just for daring to do it, [Amazing Elisa] is already interesting."

== See also ==
- List of Spanish films of 2022
