= Code Name: Emperor =

- Theatrical release poster
- Spanish: Código Emperador
- Directed by: Jorge Coira
- Written by: Jorge Guerricaechevarría
- Starring: Luis Tosar; Alexandra Masangkay; Georgina Amorós; Laura Domínguez; Miguel Rellán; María Botto; Arón Piper; Denis Gómez
- Cinematography: Pablo Rosso
- Edited by: Sandra Sánchez
- Music by: Xavi Font; Elba Fernández
- Production companies: Vaca Films; Proyecto Emperador AIE; Playtime
- Distributed by: A Contracorriente Films
- Release date: 18 March 2022 (Spain)
- Countries: Spain; France
- Language: Spanish

Code Name: Emperor (Spanish: Código Emperador; also known under the working title Proyecto Emperador) is a 2022 political thriller and spy film directed by Jorge Coira and written by Jorge Guerricaechevarría. The cast, led by Luis Tosar, also features Alexandra Masangkay, Georgina Amorós, Denis Gómez, Miguel Rellán and Arón Piper, among others.

It is about an intelligence agency operative who faces ethical challenges when he is told to lure a newly elected congressman into a honey trap with an underage teenage girl.

== Plot ==
Juan is a middle-aged Spanish intelligence agency operative who leads a small team that includes a male hacker and a female operative with a range of skills. He juggles tracking a wealthy couple who are involved in meetings with a neo-Nazi leader and a weapons trafficker and surveillance of a young congressman.

To gain access to the weapons trafficking couple's mansion, Juan and his team stage a kidnapping of the couple's live-in Filipino maid, Wendy, and they make it seem as if Juan is another kidnapping victim. The team throw the pair out of the vehicle at a stop. This set-up gives Juan the opportunity to meet Wendy. He romances her, which gives him access to the mansion so he can install hidden cameras.

As the surveillance of the weapons traffickers continues, Juan continues to meet with Wendy to gain access to the house. His team discovers evidence that the couple are planning to bring black market Cobalt-60 into Spain, which may be part of a dirty bomb plot.

Even though Juan is using his sexual relationship with Wendy as part of the surveillance operation, he starts to become emotionally attached to her. She tells him of her dream of saving enough from her work as a maid to return to the Philippines and open a bed and breakfast hotel with her sisters.

Juan's boss, a career-driven, politically-connected officer named Galan, assigns Juan to look into the life of newly-elected congressman Ángel González for illegal or unethical conduct. When Juan's team does hacking and video surveillance and it does not reveal any improprieties, Galan instructs Juan to lure the politician into a compromising situation.

Juan pressures Marta, a teenage girl he knows from a previous case, to participate in a honey trapping set-up. She sends flirtatious messages to Angel on a dating site. She meets Angel for drinks at a fancy nightclub and then plays it coy. Juan contrives a seeming "chance encounter" with her when Angel is on a work trip. She goes back to Angel's hotel room (in which Juan has had a video camera installed). After they have sex, she goes into the bathroom and smashes her nose into the sink, and then flees into the hall.

Juan confronts Angel and tells him that he has just had sex with a minor and assaulted her. Marta feels sickened by her participation in the setup, and she smashes Juan's surveillance-cam laptop and flees. Juan finds the distraught teen at her apartment and retrieves his laptop. Despite the damage, the sex recording is intact.

Meanwhile, as the weapons trafficking case develops, Wendy discovers that Juan has been using her to get access to the house and she is upset at his deception. After Juan and his team track the Cobalt-60 shipment and arrest the smugglers, police arrest the weapons trafficking couple, but Wendy was out of the house. He asks her to stay at his apartment until she can resettle. Reluctantly, she agrees.

When police arrest Wendy and threaten to deport her, Juan provides information to Galan, who explains that the intelligence service tries to ensure that they have compromising information on all politicians, to help the government to control leaders. Galan promises that Wendy will be released. Juan gets her travel documents and a ticket to the Philippines so she can flee. He gives a hard disk of his surveillance operations to a reporter and tells her to blow the whistle on the intelligence agency's unethical and illegal practices. He then abandons his old life to join Wendy in the Philippines.

== Cast ==
- Luis Tosar as Juan
- Alexandra Masangkay as Wendy
- Georgina Amorós as Marta
- Laura Domínguez
- Miguel Rellán as Galán
- María Botto as Charo
- Arón Piper as Fernando
- Denis Gómez as Ángel González
- Fran Lareu
- Santi Prego

== Production ==
The film was produced by Vaca Films and Proyecto Emperador AIE alongside Playtime, with participation from RTVE, Netflix and TVG and support from ICAA, AGADIC and MEDIA.

In April 2021, Vaca Films reported the beginning of filming in Madrid. Other shooting locations included Bilbao, A Coruña, Budapest and Panama City.

== Release ==
The film was presented on 18 March 2022, opening the 25th Málaga Film Festival. Domestically distributed by A Contracorriente Films, it was theatrically released in Spain on the same day. Netflix acquired the distribution rights elsewhere.

== Reception ==
Jonathan Holland of ScreenDaily described the film as a "a high-speed, intense, and slickly packaged ride through the dark and nasty tunnels of state power".

== Accolades ==
Year	Award	Category	Nominee(s)	Result	Ref.
2023	21st Mestre Mateo Awards	Best Film		Nominated	
2023	21st Mestre Mateo Awards	Best Director	Jorge Coira	Nominated	
2023	21st Mestre Mateo Awards	Best Actor	Luis Tosar	Nominated	
2023	21st Mestre Mateo Awards	Best Supporting Actor	Denís Gómez	Nominated	
2023	21st Mestre Mateo Awards	Best Production Supervision	María Liaño	Nominated	
2023	21st Mestre Mateo Awards	Best Original Score	Xavi Font, Elba Fernández	Nominated	
2023	21st Mestre Mateo Awards	Best Makeup and Hairstyles	Susana Veira, Beatriz Antelo	Nominated	
2023	21st Mestre Mateo Awards	Best Sound	Carlos Mouriño, Diego Staub, Yasmina Praderas	Nominated	

== See also ==
- List of Spanish films of 2022
