= Myna Has Gone =

Myna has gone
- Directed by: Sadrac Gonzalez and Sonia Escolano
- Written by: Sadrac Gonzalez and Sonia Escolano
- Produced by: Javier Albarracin
- Starring: Maria del Barrio; David Lopez-Serrano Paez; Diana Facen; Chema Rolland; Francisco Sala; Marina Oria; Alvaro Pascual
- Cinematography: Sadrac Gonzalez
- Edited by: Sadrac Gonzalez and Sonia Escolano
- Production companies: City of Light, Spain
- Distributed by: Lukantum Pictures
- Release date: December 1, 2008 (Spain)
- Running time: 117 minutes
- Country: Spain
- Languages: Spanish, Russian
- Budget: $4,500

Myna has gone (in Spanish Myna se va) is a Spanish film directed by Sonia Escolano and Sadrac González. It is a naturalistic, independent film and is played by unknown actors.

With a budget of only $4,500, the film won awards at several international film festivals including the Austin Film Festival, one of the top 10 U.S. film festivals.

The film includes a sequence shot of 33 minutes, the longest in the history of Spanish cinema. According to the directors, the actors needed psychological help during the filming because of the difficulty of the scenes. María del Barrio is the nineteen-year-old actress chosen to play the role of Myna, whose performance has been praised and won awards from several international film festivals including the Austin Film Festival and the Naperville Independent Film Festival. In 2011 the film was released in theaters in the United States which include the cities of Minneapolis, Los Angeles, St. Louis, Phoenix, Houston, San Francisco, Dallas, Seattle, Miami, Denver, New York, and Palm Beach.

== Cast ==
- María del Barrio as Myna
- David Lopez-Serrano Paez as the doctor
- Diana Facen as Ana, Pablo's mother
- Chema Rolland as George, Pablo's father
- Alvaro Pascual as the vet
- Francisco Sala as Pablo
- Marina Oria as Charles' wife

== Awards ==
Film festival	Category	Result
London Spanish Film Festival		Official Selection
Rencontres des cinémas d'Europe, France		Official Selection
Austin Film Festival		Special Jury Recognition for Acting
The Indie Fest	Best Picture	Winner
Athens Fest		Official Selection
Indie Fest USA		Official Selection
The Bronx Independent Film Festival, NY		Official Selection
The Indie Gathering	Best Latin Movie	Winner
Atlanta Underground Film Fest	Best Foreign Language Film	Winner
Sidney Underground Film festival, Australia		Official Selection
Naperville International Film Festival, Illinois		Official Selection
Naperville International Film Festival, Illinois	Best Actress	Winner
Zaragoza Film Festival	Best Actress	Special Mention
Nueva York Independent Film and Video Festival		Official Selection
Valencia Film Festival, Tirant Avant	Best Picture	Nominated
Valencia Film Festival, Tirant Avant	Best Screenplay	Nominated
Semana Internacional de Cine e Inmigración de Bilbao		Closing film
Macon International Film Festival, Georgia	Best Picture	Winner
Cinematek Film Festival		Official selection
Films de Femmes, Creteil, France	Best Picture	Official Selection
Atlantida Film Fest		Official selection
