= Dragonflies (film) =

- Theatrical release poster
- Spanish: Libélulas
- Directed by: Luc Knowles
- Written by: Luc Knowles
- Starring: Milena Smit; Olivia Baglivi; Pol Hermoso; Marina Esteve; Javier Collado; Berta Sánchez; Gonzalo Herrero; Aramis Baglivi; Lei Lei Wu; Rakel Brel; Gala Ramón
- Cinematography: Iván Sánchez
- Edited by: Rocío Pérez Lavilla
- Production company: Clapham Films
- Distributed by: Begin Again Films
- Release dates: 23 March 2022 (Málaga); 16 September 2022 (Spain)
- Country: Spain
- Language: Spanish

Dragonflies (Spanish: Libélulas) is a 2022 Spanish drama film directed by Luc Knowles in his feature film debut which stars Milena Smit and Olivia Baglivi.

== Plot ==
The plot follows the story of two friends, Cata and Alex, who develop escapist plans about fleeing from their homes in an undeterminate location in the outskirts of Madrid, a seemingly idyllic but actually decaying place.

== Cast ==
- Milena Smit as Cata
- Olivia Baglivi as Alex
- Pol Hermoso
- Marina Esteve
- Javier Collado as Vico
- Gonzalo Herrero as Jota
- Noemí Climent
- Berta Sánchez
- Rakel Brel
- Aramis Baglivi
- Lei Lei Wu
- Gala Ramón

== Production ==
The film is a Clapham Films production. It was shot in locations of the province of Segovia and the Madrid region. Iván Sánchez worked as cinematographer.

== Release ==
Included in the 'Zonazine' slate of the 25th Málaga Film Festival, Dragonflies was presented at the Albéniz Theatre on 23 March 2022. Distributed by Begin Again Films, it was theatrically released in Spain on 16 September 2022.

== Reception ==
Beatriz Martínez of Fotogramas rated the film 4 out of 5 stars highlighting the chemistry between Smit and Baglivi as the best thing about the film.

Manuel J. Lombardo of Diario de Sevilla rated the film 2 out of 5 stars, assessing that Knowles' debut feature "smells too much like a photocopy of numerous [common] places in American indie cinema", otherwise incorporating themes of lumpen sorority and escapist desires, a forced criminal-police subplot and a flamenco-electro soundtrack that underpin a "new and artificial" product.

Paula Arantzazu Ruiz of Cinemanía rated it 3 out 5 stars observing that "were it not for the interpretative tête-à-tête of its actresses, [Knowles'] proposal would not advance much further than the author's previous musical video for the song 'Wondering'".

Josu Eguren of El Correo rated the film 1 out of 3 stars, considering that below "the laconic and nihilistic surface of the dialogues" held by the protagonists, the film is based on "such a fragile aesthetic pose" that it threatens to fall apart upon Knowles' attempt to introduce some drops of thriller in the mix.

Luis Martínez of El Mundo rated Dragonflies 3 out of 5 stars, deeming it to be "an incomplete, uneven and slightly pretentious film", yet also "perfectly alive", otherwise highlighting the helmer's ability "to create a strange and slightly impostured universe, as much his own as delicate".

== Accolades ==
Year	Award	Category	Nominee(s)	Result	Ref.
2022	25th Málaga Film Festival	Best Actress ('Zonazine' section)	Milena Smit & Olivia Baglivi	Won	
2022	25th Málaga Film Festival	Audience Award ('Zonazine' section)		Won	

== See also ==
- List of Spanish films of 2022
