= Elena Martín =

Spanish actress and filmmaker

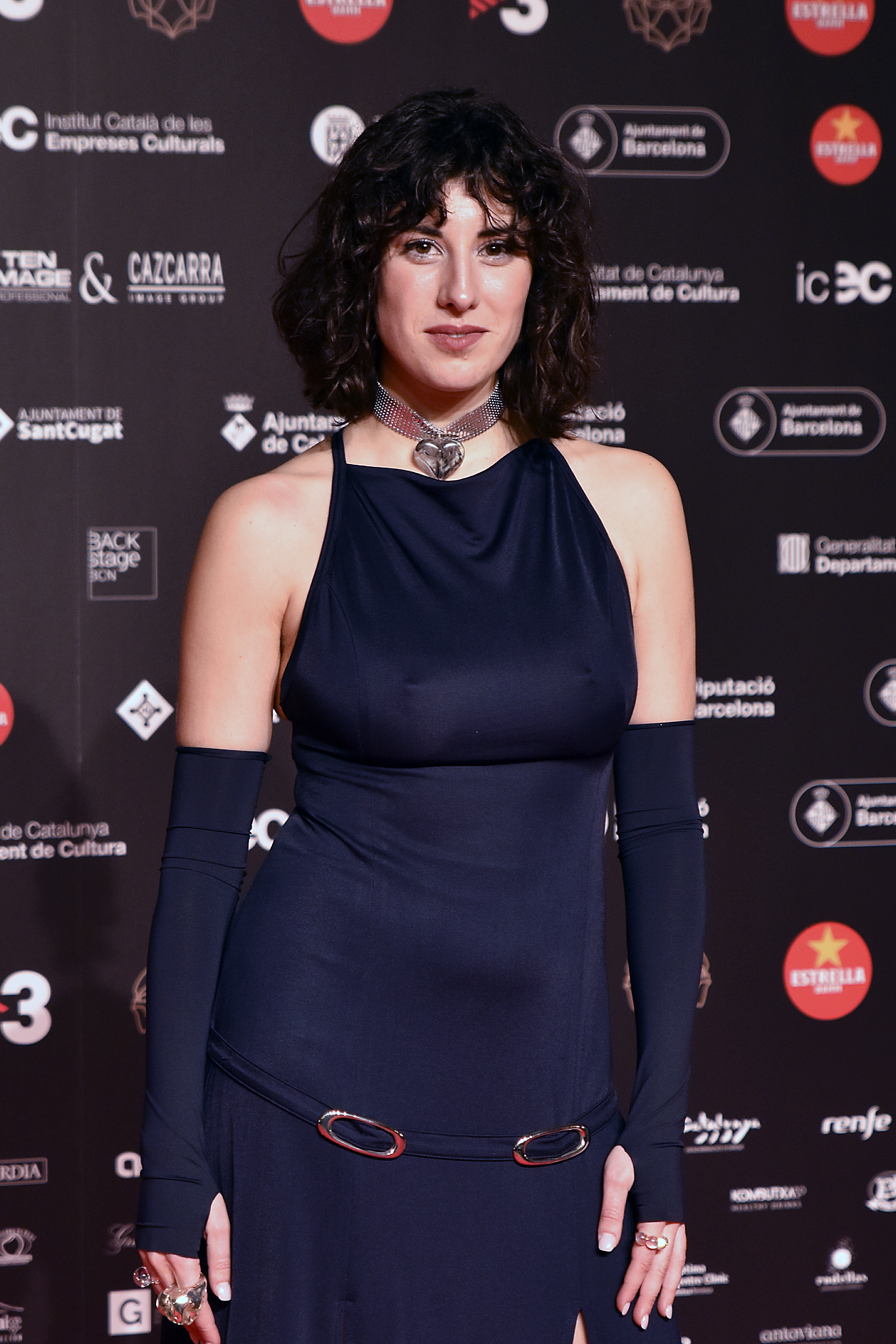
- At the 14th Gaudí Awards' photocall (2022)
- Born: Elena Martín Gimeno; 1992 (age 33–34); Barcelona, Catalonia, Spain
- Education: Pompeu Fabra University
- Occupations: Actress; film director; screenwriter

Elena Martín Gimeno (born 1992) is a Spanish actress and filmmaker from Catalonia, Spain.

== Biography ==
Born in Barcelona in 1992, Elena Martín Gimeno earned a degree in Audiovisual Communication from the Pompeu Fabra University. She starred as Àgata in the 2016 film Les amigues de l'Àgata, and made her feature film directorial debut with the 2017 drama Júlia ist, which she also co-wrote and starred. For this work, she won the Best Director Award at the Málaga Film Festival's Zonacine section. She later directed episodes of the season 1 of Perfect Life, an episode of the anthology series En casa and collaborated in the writing of Veneno (in which she also featured in a cameo). She also entered development of Creatura, her sophomore feature. Creatura screened in Cannes' Directors' Fortnight in 2023, won Martín a nomination to the Goya Award for Best Director and was featured as the Closing Night selection for the American Film Institute's 2023 European Union Film Showcase.

== Filmography ==
Year	Title	Role	Notes	Ref
2016	Les amigues de l'Àgata	Àgata		
2017	Júlia ist	Júlia	Also co-writer and director	
2020	Veneno	Charo	Cameo. Episode 3: "Acaríciame". Also writer of episodes 3 and 7	
2022	Nosaltres no ens matarem amb pistoles (We Won't Kill Each Other with Guns)	Elena		
2023	Unicorns	Abril		
2023	Creatura	Mila	Also co-writer and director	
