= Irene Moray =

Spanish photographer and filmmaker (born 1992)

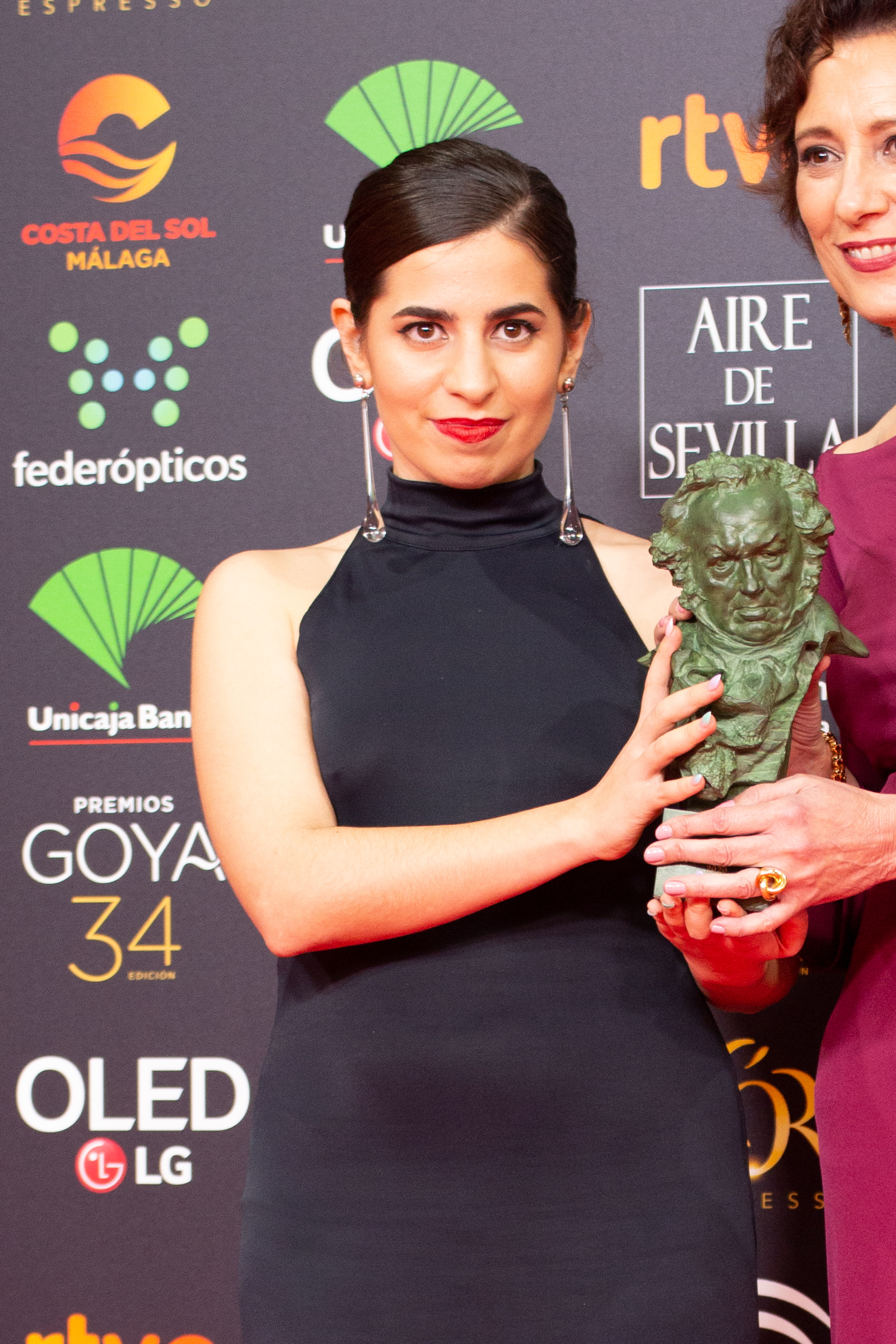
- Moray at the 2020 Goya Awards
- Born: 1992 (age 33–34); Barcelona, Spain
- Occupations: Photographer; filmmaker

Irene Moray (born 1992) is a Spanish photographer and filmmaker. Her 2019 short film Suc de síndria (Watermelon Juice) won the Goya Award for Best Fictional Short Film and the Gaudí Award for Best Short Film in 2020.

Her later work includes the 2025 short film Plàncton, which premiered at the Locarno Film Festival, and her first feature film, Piel de foca.

== Early life and photography ==
Moray was born in Barcelona in 1992. She wanted to study film but enrolled in fine arts because she could not afford the ESCAC film school, and left after one year. She moved to Berlin in 2012, spent three years collaborating with the performance collective the--family, and worked as a photographer for agencies, producers and publications. With the collective, she performed at the Astrup Fearnley Museum in Oslo and the Chisenhale Gallery in London.

== Career ==
Moray wrote, directed and starred in her first short, Bad Lesbian, a comedy about a Spanish woman living in Berlin. It won the audience award at ALCINE and the jury prize at the F.i.S.H. Festival in Rostock.

=== Suc de síndria ===
After four years in Germany, Moray returned to Barcelona, where she wrote and directed Suc de síndria. She also handled the cinematography; Elena Martín and Max Grosse played Bàrbara and Pol, a couple who spend a holiday with friends while Bàrbara tries to regain her ability to orgasm after being raped. The 22-minute film had its world premiere in the 2019 Berlinale Shorts competition and was nominated for European Short Film at the 2019 European Film Awards. Writing in Fotogramas, Carlos Loureda linked the distinct visual textures of the film's sequences to Moray's background in photography. Moray had met Martín while working as the still photographer on Júlia ist. She used guided meditation to help Martín prepare for emotionally demanding scenes in Suc de síndria.

=== Television and music videos ===
In 2020, Moray joined Leticia Dolera and Lucía Alemany in directing the second season of Vida perfecta, a six-episode production for Movistar+. In 2021, she and Elena Martín co-directed the music video for Rigoberta Bandini's "Perra", produced by Canada.

=== Plàncton and Piel de foca ===
Moray's Catalan-language short Plàncton premiered in the Pardi di Domani section of the 2025 Locarno Film Festival. Starring Clara Sans and Malcom McCarthy, it follows Joel, an emotionally blocked man whose former love visits him. In September 2025, Variety reported that her first feature, Piel de Foca (Sealskin), was in production with Lastor Media and Vilaüt Films. Its story follows Flora, a cleaner grieving her grandmother, who tries to help a teacher who is gradually becoming transparent. Discussing Plàncton in 2026, Moray said she had sought to explore men's emotional blockages through landscape and atmosphere, and had developed the characters' silence during editing.

== Awards ==
The Goya for Suc de síndria was awarded to Moray as director and Miriam Porté as producer. The film also won Best Short Film at the 12th Gaudí Awards, held on 19 January 2020. Accepting the Goya, Moray dedicated the award to survivors of sexual violence and said they had the right to "make noise", succeed, take up space, enjoy their bodies and orgasm. In December 2020, the film won the 18th Ibero-American Short Film Competition organised by Versión Española and the SGAE Foundation; Martín and Grosse also received the AISGE acting prize.
