= Aixa Villagrán =

Spanish actress

- Villagrán in 2026
- Born: 12 July 1978 (age 48); Seville, Spain
- Occupation: Actress
- Relatives: Julián Villagrán (brother)

Aixa Villagrán (born 12 July 1978) is a Spanish actress. She had a breakthrough performance in the comedy series Perfect Life, whose first season was in 2019.

== Early life and education ==
Aixa Villagrán was born in Seville on 12 July 1978. Her older brother Julián has also pursued an acting career.

She trained for acting at the Juan Carlos Corazza school in Madrid, and then moved to Mexico. She completed her training at the Patricia Reyes Spíndola school and joined the CNA theatre company.

== Career ==
Villagrán returned to Spain to further develop her career. Her television work includes credits in SMS: Sin Miedo a Soñar, Los hombres de Paco, Allí abajo, and Derecho a soñar.

She has featured in such films as Mataharis (2007), Rose et Noir (2009), Amador (2010), Kiki, Love to Love (2016), and María (and Everybody Else) (2016).

She received critical and public acclaim for her role as Esther in the comedy-drama series Perfect Life (2019–2021). She won the Special Performance Prize at the 2019 Canneseries alongside co-stars Leticia Dolera and Celia Freijeiro. Her performance in the series also earned her nominations to the 29th Actors and Actresses Union Awards and the 7th Feroz Awards.

She has since appeared in such television series as The Snow Girl, La mesías, and Fine Arts. Her recent films include Crazy About Her (2021), More the Merrier (2021), On the Fringe (2022), Tomorrow Is Today (2022), and The Red Virgin (2024). For her role playing a domestic servant in The Red Virgin, Villagrán was nominated for the Goya Award for Best Supporting Actress. She portrayed a journalist in the film Another League.
