= Sonia Escolano =

Spanish film director

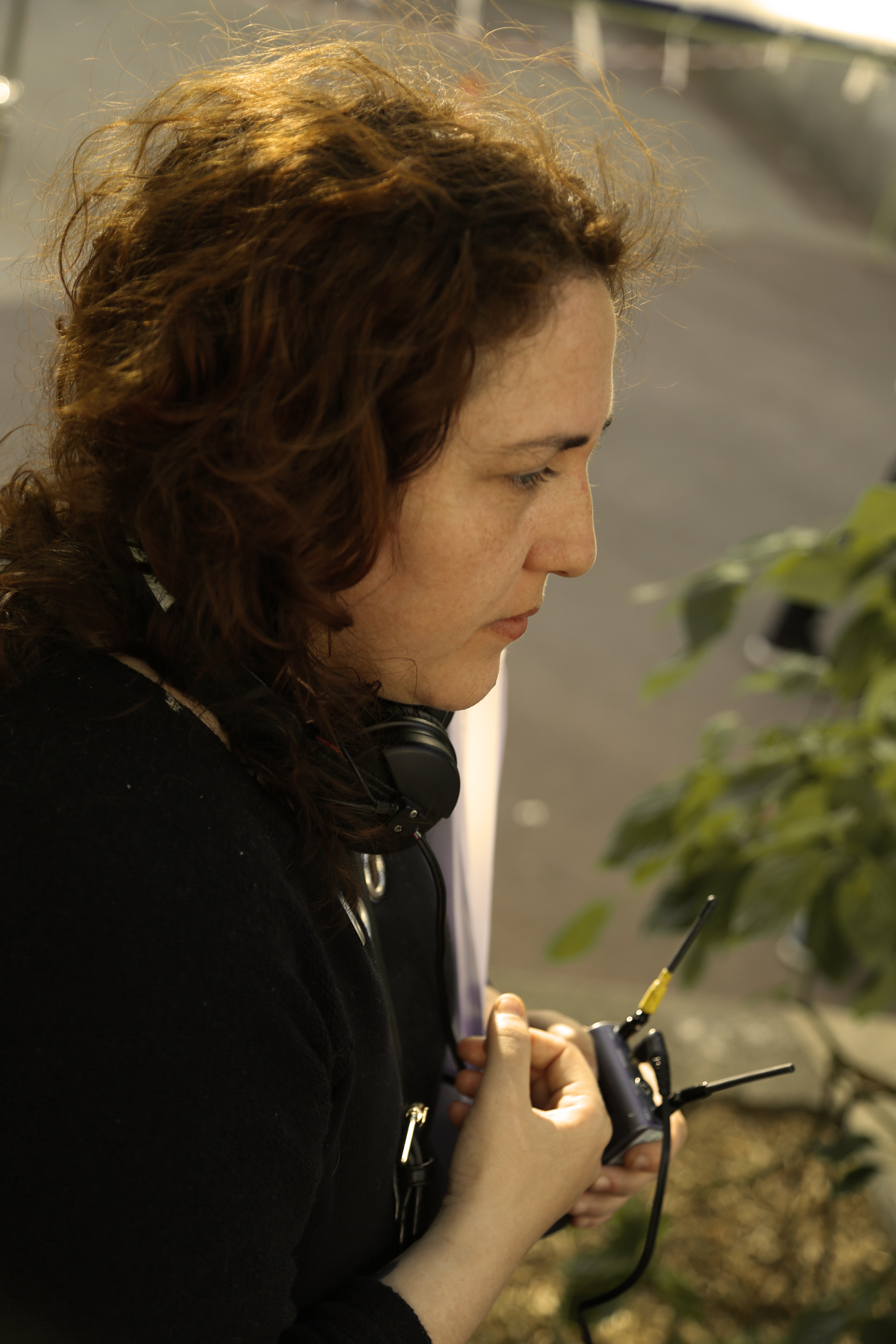
- 2018, shooting of House of Sweat and Tears
- Born: Fuensanta-Sonia Escolano Pujante; December 26, 1980 (age 44); Alicante
- Occupation(s): film director, screenwriter

Sonia Escolano is a Valencian film director, born in Alicante in December 1980. She moved to Alcalá de Henares in 1996 to study literature. After that, she filmed several short films like Mr. Long-neck, which won second prize at the Alcine film festival. In 2006 she filmed the short film Juliets.

In the literary field, she has won many awards for poetry and essays. She taught theatre for children for several years. She successfully handled child actors in the short film Cedric, which participated in festivals around the globe, and in the controversial The Rapture of Ganymede.

In 2009 she directed, with Sadrac González-Perellón, the experimental film Myna Has Gone, which tells the story of an illegal immigrant and her problems in Spain. This film participated in many international film festivals, including the Austin Film Festival, where it won the Special Jury Recognition for Acting The film was also an official section at Athensfest, Les Reencontres des Cinémas d'Europe, and The Bronx, in New York City.

In 2009 she filmed the short film Invisible Old People, which received an official selection at the Vancouver Film Festival.

Sonia also was the director of the theatre group "Rotos y Descosidos", where she teaches acting to new opera singers, specializing in performances of Federico Garcia Lorca.

In March 2015 she published her first fiction novel titled El Rey Lombriz (The King Worm) and based on a screenplay.

En 2018 she wrote and directed her new feature film House of Sweat and Tears. The film was presented in Frontières, in the Cannes Film Festival. Then, the film was selected to participate in the Fantastic Fest, in Austin.

== Filmography ==
Year	Film	Format
2005	Mr. Long-Neck	Short film
2006	Juliets	Short film
2007	Cédric	Short film
2007	The Rapture of Ganymede	Short film
2009	Invisible Old People	Short film
2009	Myna Has Gone	Feature film
2018	House of Sweat and Tears	Feature film
2024	Norberta	Feature film
