= Carmen Ruiz =

Spanish actress (b. 1974)

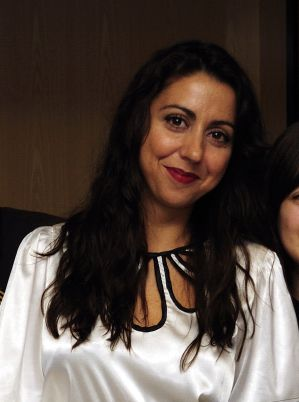
- (2009)
- Born: Carmen Ruiz Hernández; 28 July 1974 (age 51); Madrid, Spain
- Occupation: Actress

Carmen Ruiz Hernández (born 28 July 1974) is a Spanish actress primarily known for her television work although she has also done theatre and film. She earned early visibility in her career for her performances in Mujeres and Yo soy Bea. She has since featured in series such as Con el culo al aire, Gym Tony, Matadero, Madres. Amor y vida or Deudas.

== Biography ==
Carmen Ruiz Hernández was born on 28 July 1974 in Madrid, daughter to a hairdresser and a painter. After working for seven years for Telefónica, she left the job and completed her training as an actress. Some of her early film work include a small performance in the 2004 film Crimen Ferpecto and the role of Toribia in Mortadelo and Filemon. Mission: Save the Planet (2008). She earned visibility for her performances in the television series Mujeres and Yo soy Bea, both premiered in 2006.

== Filmography ==
Television

Year	Title	Role	Notes	Ref
2006–08	Yo soy Bea	Chusa	Main	
2006	Mujeres	Julia	Main	
2011	BuenAgente	Olivia	Main	
2012–14	Con el culo al aire	Eli	Main	
2015–16	Gym Tony	Petra Palomero	Main	
2019	Matadero	María José	Main	
2020	Madres. Amor y vida	Luisa	Main	
2021	Deudas	Lucía	Main	
2021	Amar es para siempre	Penélope Valdivia	Introduced in Season 10	
2025	Animal (Old Dog, New Tricks)			

Film

Year	Title	Role	Notes	Ref
2008	Mortadelo and Filemon. Mission: Save the Planet	Toribia		
2010	Que se mueran los feos (To Hell with the Ugly)	Sofía		
2011	En fuera de juego (Offside)	Mónica		
2012	Fin (The End)	Sara		
2013	La vida inesperada (The Unexpected Life)	Sandra		
2015	Mi gran noche (My Big Night)	Amparo		
2016	A Stroke of Luck (Villaviciosa de al Lado)	Milagros		
2017	Es por tu bien (It's for Your Own Good)	Alicia		
2018	Los futbolísimos	Juana		
2021	The Unemployment Club	Diana		

== Accolades ==
Year	Award	Category	Work	Result	Ref.
2011	20th Actors and Actresses Union Awards	Best Film Actress in a Minor Role	To Hell With the Ugly	Nominated	
2017	26th Actors and Actresses Union Awards	Best Stage Actress in a Secondary Role	Bajo terapia	Nominated	
2020	29th Actors and Actresses Union Awards	Best Television Actress in a Secondary Role	Matadero	Won	
2023	31st Actors and Actresses Union Awards	Best Television Actress in a Secondary Role	Amar es para siempre	Nominated	
