= Nely Reguera =

- Born: 1978 (age 47–48); Barcelona
- Education: ESCAC
- Occupation: Film director
- Notable work: María (and Everybody Else),

Nely Reguera (born 1978) is a Catalonian film director.

Reguera is referred to as one of the most talented emerging Spanish directors, and one of the few female ones in the male-dominant scene. A graduate of the ESCAC, as a graduation project she directed Ausencias (2002) short film, followed with Pablo (2009) short. The latter, screened and praised at numerous international film festivals, won Special Jury Mention award at the Gijón International Film Festival and the Huesca International Film Festival and made her known. It was followed by a documentary Muxía to ferida and short films Three Days with the Family (Mar Coll) and Blog.

Her debut feature, María (and Everybody Else), was presented in the New Directors section of the San Sebastián Film Festival in September 2016 and screened at numerous film festivals around the world. The film was well received by critics and audience, it won several awards, including Best Film best film at Miami’s HBO Ibero-American Competition, among other international prizes, and was nominated for Best New Director prize at the Goya Awards.

Reguera has also directed several episodes of Welcome to the Family (2017), Valeria (2020), and Galgos (2024) series.

She wrote the screenplay and directed her second feature, La voluntaria, in 2021. With Carmen Machi in the title role, it was filmed in the Malakasa refugee camp in Athens. A Spanish-Greek co-production, the movie was released in 2022 and opened the 50th edition of the Huesca International Film Festival.

As of 2024, Reguera is a professor at the ESCAC and an active member of the Cine en curso film outreach project dedicated to children.
