= Sadrac González-Perellón =

Spanish film director (born 1983)

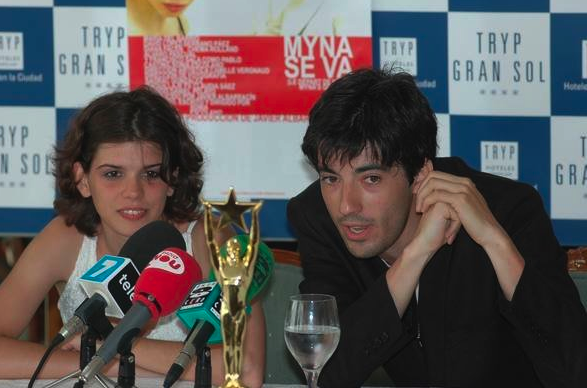
- Sadrac González-Perellón at Sitges International Fantastic Film Festival, 2022.
- Born: Sadrac González Perellón; September 24, 1983 (age 42); Madrid
- Occupations: film director, screenwriter, film producer

Sadrac González-Perellón is a Spanish film director, screenwriter and film producer born in Madrid in 1983.

== Biography ==
After studying Art and Drawing, he began shooting several short films presented in festivals around the world.

In 2009, he co-directed and wrote the art-house feature film Myna Has Gone alongside Sonia Escolano, which tells the story of a young illegal immigrant and the problems that she has to face in Spain. This film won as Narrative Feature Special Jury Recognition for Acting in Austin Film Festival. It also was part of Official Selection in Athensfest, Les Rencontres des Cinémas d'Europe, at France, o el The Bronx Independent, at New York, among other film festivals.

In 2017, after returning from a retirement in France, he shot the feature film Black Hollow Cage, a sci-fi drama that tells the story of Alice, a girl traumatized by the loss of her arm that lives in an isolated house in the woods with the only company of her father and a wolf dog. One fine day, the girl finds a strange cubic device in the woods that will allow her to change the past.

Black Hollow Cage won the Jury's Prize in Bucheon International Fantastic Film Festival in Korea, the most important genre festival in Asia. Moreover, it obtained Official Selection in Sitges International Fantastic Film Festival, Neuchâtel International Fantastic Film Festival and Raindance (Nominated to Best Film, Best Script for Sadrac González-Perellón and Best Actress for Lowena McDonell).

In 2018 he made his first film as a producer, House of Sweat and Tears, directed by Sonia Escolano. The film is presented in Frontiéres in the Cannes Film Festival. Subsequently, the movie got to enter in the official section of one of the most important film festivals in the world, the Fantastic Fest, in Austin.

In 2022 he released his next feature film Amazing Elisa, a drama and thriller film that intertwines several characters where Elisa, a girl of twelve who thinks she's a superhero, lives with her father after her mother's death. It stars Asier Etxeandia, Silvia Abascal, Iván Massagué and the young actress Jana San Antonio as Elisa. The film is being presented at the Sitges International Fantastic Film Festival and the Fantastic Fest, receiving very good reviews from the festival.

== Filmography ==
Year	Film	Position
2009	Myna Has Gone	as writer and director
2017	Black Hollow Cage	as writer and director
2018	House of Sweat and Tears	as producer
2022	Amazing Elisa	as writer and director
