= Milena Smit =

Spanish actress

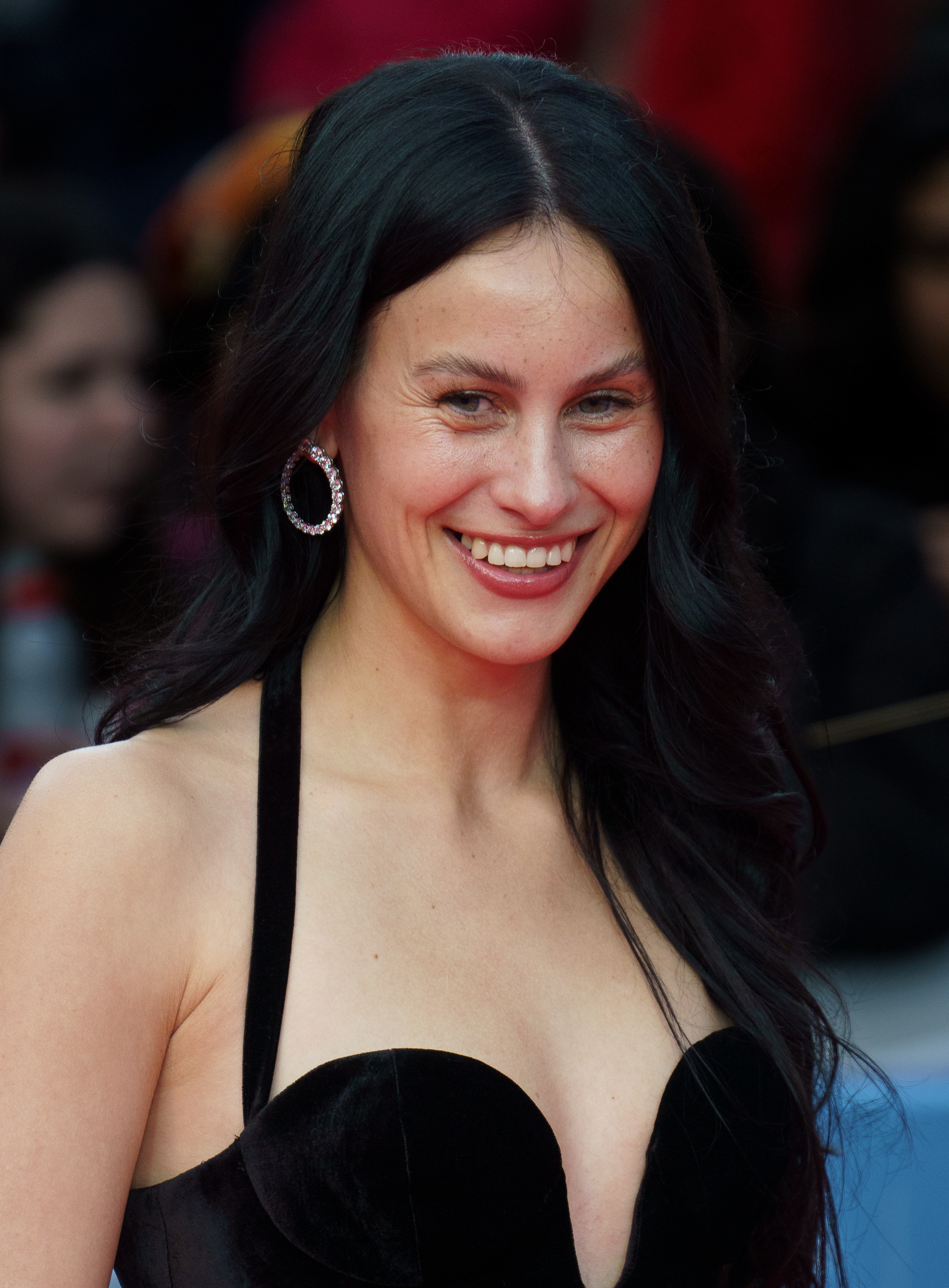
- Smit in 2025
- Born: Elisabeth Milena Smit Márquez; 5 October 1996 (age 30); Elche, Valencian Community, Spain
- Occupations: Actress; model
- Years active: 2018–present

Elisabeth Milena Smit Márquez (born 5 October 1996) is a Spanish film and television actress. Her acting debut in the feature film Cross the Line (2020) earned her a nomination for the Goya Award for Best New Actress.

== Early life and education ==
Elisabeth Milena Smit Márquez was born in Elche on 5 October 1996. She was raised in Torrevieja, Torre de la Horadada, and Murcia. Her father is Dutch and mother is Spanish.

She first started working as a fashion model when she was 15 years old.

She trained as an actress at the Cristina Rota acting school and was taught by Bernard Hiller, an acting coach of such actors as Leonardo DiCaprio and Cameron Diaz.

Before becoming an actress, she was a waitress, shop assistant, babysitter, and information assistant on the subway. She moved to Madrid in search of career opportunities.

== Career ==
Smit's first film appearances were in various short films such as Diagonales, Innermost, Chimichanga, and Adentro. In 2020, she appeared in her first feature film, Cross the Line, directed by David Victori with Mario Casas. For her work on the film, she was nominated for the Goya Award for Best New Actress. The film's casting team discovered the actress via Instagram.

After her participation in Cross the Line, she was signed by Pedro Almodóvar for his film Parallel Mothers with Penélope Cruz and Aitana Sánchez-Gijón. In the film, Smit and Cruz play women who become pregnant by accident and befriend each other in the maternity ward. Both characters give birth to girls on the same day. On her performance in the film, director Almodóvar said: "she has an emotional intelligence and a sincerity not learned in any school". Smit received a Goya Award nomination for Best Supporting Actress for the role.

Smit is one of the leads in the 2021 Netflix original series The Girl in the Mirror, directed by Sergio G. Sánchez. Smit also appeared in Luc Knowles's debut feature Dragonflies (2022) alongside Olivia Baglivi, performing the role of Cata. In July 2021, filming began on the horror film Tin&Tina (released 2023), in which she appears with Jaime Lorente.

Smit plays a lead role as reporter Miren Rojo in the 2023 Netflix crime series The Snow Girl.

== Filmography ==
=== Film ===
Key
†	Denotes films that have not yet been released

Year	Title	Role	Notes	Ref.
2020	No matarás (Cross the Line)	Mila		
2021	Madres paralelas (Parallel Mothers)	Ana		
2022	Libélulas (Dragonflies)	Cata		
2023	Tin&Tina	Lola		
2024	El hoyo 2 (The Platform 2)	Perempuan		
2026	Amarga Navidad (Bitter Christmas)	Natalia		
2026	Trinidad			
2027	Domani †			

=== Television ===
Year	Title	Role	Notes	Ref
2022	Alma (The Girl in the Mirror)	Nico		
2023	La chica de la nieve (The Snow Girl)	Miren Rojo	Main role	
