= Carlos Santos (actor) =

Spanish actor

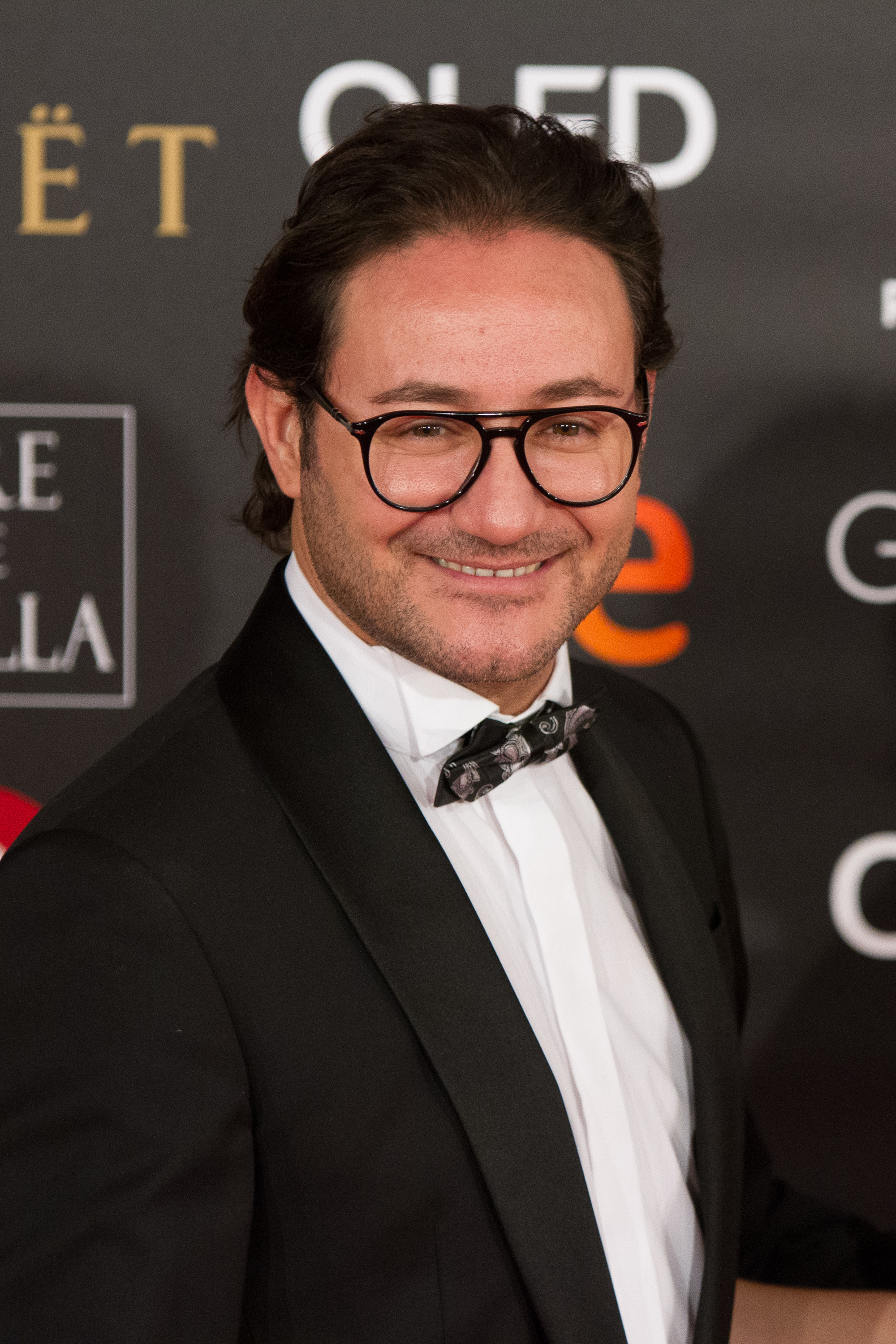
- Santos at the 32nd Goya Awards in 2018
- Born: Carlos Santos Rubio; 3 August 1977 (age 49); Murcia, Spain
- Occupation: Actor
- Years active: 2001-present

Carlos Santos Rubio (born 1977) is a Spanish actor. He appeared in more than thirty films since 2001.

== Selected filmography ==
Film
Year	Title	Role	Notes	Ref.
2008	Mortadelo and Filemon. Mission: Save the Planet			
2009	Brain Drain			
2010	Even the Rain	Bartolomé de las Casas		
2012	Operation Autumn			
2016	Smoke & Mirrors	Luis Roldán	Goya Award for Best New Actor	
2016	Villaviciosa de al lado	Ricardo		
2022	El test (The Te$t)	Héctor		
TBA	Últimas voluntades	Julián		

TV
Year	Title	Role	Notes
2005-2010; 2021	Los hombres de Paco	Povedilla	
2013-2014	The Time in Between		
2014	Bienvenidos al Lolita	Alfredo	
2026	Aquel	Raphael	
