= Antonio Pagudo =

Spanish actor

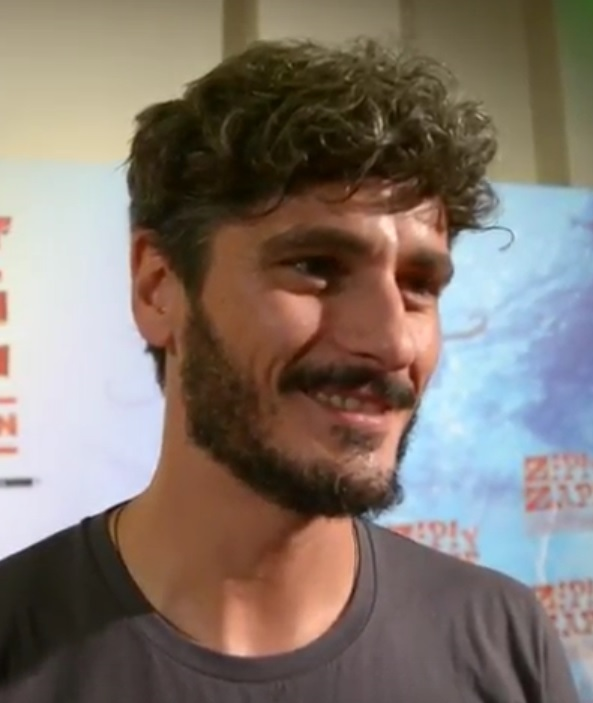
- Antonio Pagudo in 2016
- Born: Antonio Pérez Agudo; 2 February 1977 (age 48); Baza, Granada, Spain
- Occupation: Actor
- Height: 1.77 m (5 ft 9 1/2 in)
- Website: www.antonio-pagudo.net

Antonio Pérez Agudo (born 2 February 1977) known professionally as Antonio Pagudo is a Spanish actor.

== Career ==
He made appearances in theater, television and films. He played in the spectaclesSpingo or Star Trip, in which he did a tour in Spain and in foreign countries. He was known for his role as Javier Maroto in the TV series La que se avecina. He also appeared during two years in Arrayán.

In films he appeared in Mi tío Paco, directed by Tacho González, and El Síndrome de Svenson, directed by Kepa Sojo. In 2013, he voiced Reggie in Free Birds.

In 2014, he portrayed Fedria in The Eunuch by Terence, a comedy directed by Pep Antón Gómez for the XL edición del Festival Internacional de Teatro Clásico de Mérida.

== Filmography ==
=== Films ===
- Asesinato en el Hormiguero Express (2018) as himself
- Los futbolísimos (2018)
- Villaviciosa de al lado (2016) as Juandi
- Interlinings (2015) as Juanito
- Una mañana cualquiera (2015) as Protagonist passenger
- Amateur (2013) as Dionisio
- Save the Zombies (2013) as Borja
- ¿Quién es Florinda Bolkan? (2010) as Diego
- Desechos (2010) as Talín
- Salir pitando (2007) as Cliente Hombre
- Línea 57 (2006) as Toni
- GAL (2006) as Secretario de Estado
- El síndrome de Svensson (2006) as Teles
- Mi tío Paco (2006) as Paco

=== TV ===
- Terror y feria (2019)
- La que se avecina (2007-2017) as Javi Maroto
- Lo que escondían sus ojos (2016) as Dionisio Ridruejo
- Cuéntame cómo pasó (2005-2007) as Sergio
