= List of 2019 box office number-one films in Argentina =

This is a list of films which placed number-one at the weekend box office in Argentina during 2019. Amounts are in American dollars.

== Number-one films ==
†	This implies the highest-grossing movie of the year.

#	Weekend end date	Film	Box office	Openings in the top ten
1	6 January 2019	Ralph Breaks the Internet	$1,486,813	The Mule (#3), Second Act (#6)
2	13 January 2019	Dragon Ball Super: Broly	$1,547,420	Spider-Man: Into the Spider-Verse (#3), Mortal Engines (#8)
3	20 January 2019	Ralph Breaks the Internet	$594,811	Glass (#3), Creed II (#4), Florianópolis Dream (#9)
4	27 January 2019	Ralph Breaks the Internet	$391,144	Mary Poppins Returns (#2), BTS World Tour: Love Yourself in Seoul (#3), Vice (#8)
5	3 February 2019	How to Train Your Dragon: The Hidden World	$965,249	
6	10 February 2019	How to Train Your Dragon: The Hidden World	$490,157	Escape Room (#2), The Lego Movie 2: The Second Part (#3), The Favourite (#6)
7	17 February 2019	How to Train Your Dragon: The Hidden World	$316,099	Alita: Battle Angel (#2), Happy Death Day 2U (#3), Green Book (#4)
8	24 February 2019	How to Train Your Dragon: The Hidden World	$291,672	Cold Pursuit (#2), A Dog's Way Home (#3)
9	5 March 2019	Green Book	$317,862	La misma sangre (#5), Heilstätten (#6)
10	10 March 2019	Captain Marvel	$1,932,142	On the Basis of Sex (#8)
11	17 March 2019	Captain Marvel	$1,126,222	The Prodigy (#3), Five Feet Apart (#5), Maria by Callas (#10)
12	24 March 2019	Captain Marvel	$573,246	Us (#2), The Old Man & the Gun (#3), Yo, mi mujer y mi mujer muerta (#8)
13	31 March 2019	Dumbo	$1,048,725	Mary Queen of Scots (#7), Captive State (#8), El kiosko (#10)
14	April 7, 2019	Dumbo	$637,051	Shazam! (#2), Pet Sematary (#3), 4x4 (#4), Palau: La película (#6), At Eternity's Gate (#8)
15	14 April 2019	Dumbo	$390,964	Wonder Park (#5), After (#6), Hellboy (#8), The Aftermath (#9)
16	21 April 2019	The Curse of La Llorona	$713,716	They Shall Not Grow Old (#10)
17	28 April 2019	Avengers: Endgame	$6,809,670	The Guilty (#7)
18	5 May 2019	Avengers: Endgame	$3,279,315	El hijo (#4), River, el más grande siempre (#5)
19	12 May 2019	Avengers: Endgame	$1,724,664	Pokémon Detective Pikachu (#2), The Hustle (#4), The Professor and the Madman (#7), Ben Is Back (#8)
20	19 May 2019	Avengers: Endgame	$794,531	The Weasel's Tale (#2), A Dog's Journey (#4), UglyDolls (#5), Tolkien (#10)
21	26 May 2019	Aladdin	$1,189,254	John Wick: Chapter 3 – Parabellum (#4), Brightburn (#6), Non-Fiction (#9)
22	2 June 2019	Aladdin	$911,353	Godzilla: King of the Monsters (#2), Rocketman (#6), Ma (#8), El Ratón Perez y los guardianes del libro mágico (#9)
23	9 June 2019	Aladdin	$806,791	Dark Phoenix (#2), Pain and Glory (#5), Mia and the White Lion (#10)
24	17 June 2019	Aladdin	$733,330	Men in Black: International (#2), Long Shot (#9)
25	23 June 2019	Toy Story 4 †	$7,456,182	Hotel Mumbai (#7)
26	30 June 2019	Toy Story 4 †	$4,667,755	Annabelle Comes Home (#2), No soy tu mami (#3), What They Had (#8)
27	9 July 2019	Toy Story 4 †	$3,868,285	Spider-Man: Far From Home (#2), The Secret Life of Pets 2 (#3), Ricordi? (#9)
28	14 July 2019	Toy Story 4 †	$2,090,034	Child's Play (#6)
29	21 July 2019	The Lion King	$3,764,120	
30	28 July 2019	The Lion King	$2,992,137	Crawl (#5), Red Joan (#7)
31	4 August 2019	The Lion King	$1,897,914	Hobbs & Shaw (#2), Dogman (#9)
32	11 August 2019	The Lion King	$701,275	The Art of Racing in the Rain (#7), Poms (#8), The Kitchen (#10)
33	18 August 2019	Heroic Losers	$1,102,515	The Angry Birds Movie 2 (#3), Anna (#7), Santiago, Italia (#10)
34	25 August 2019	Heroic Losers	$869,949	Once Upon a Time in Hollywood (#2), PAW Patrol Mighty Pups: The Movie (#6), A Man in a Hurry (#10)
35	1 September 2019	Heroic Losers	$591,762	Dora and the Lost City of Gold (#4), Extremely Wicked, Shockingly Evil and Vile (#8), Greta (#9)
36	8 September 2019	It Chapter Two	$1,640,151	El retiro (#6)
37	15 September 2019	It Chapter Two	$767,588	Yesterday (#3), Angel Has Fallen (#4), Bruja (#8), Missing Link (#9)
38	22 September 2019	It Chapter Two	$355,000	Nothing to Lose 2 (#2), Ad Astra (#4)
39	29 September 2019	Nothing to Lose 2	$200,831	Abominable (#3), Scary Stories to Tell in the Dark (#5), The Moneychanger (#9)
40	6 October 2019	Joker	$1,589,897	47 Meters Down: Uncaged (#6)
41	13 October 2019	Joker	$1,811,415	Rambo: Last Blood (#4), Playmobil: The Movie (#5), Where'd You Go, Bernadette (#8), After the Wedding (#9)
42	20 October 2019	Maleficent: Mistress of Evil	$918,775	
43	27 October 2019	Joker	$658,351	
44	3 November 2019	Joker	$536,102	
45	10 November 2019	Joker	$355,735	
46	17 November 2019	Joker	$256,693	Gemini Man (#3), Ford v Ferrari (#5), Synonyms (#9)
47	24 November 2019	Joker	$165,126	Downton Abbey (#3), Motherless Brooklyn (#7), Queen of Spades: Through the Looking Glass (#10)
48	1 December 2019	Maleficent: Mistress of Evil	$138,255	Charlie's Angels (#3), Midway (#4)
49	8 December 2019	Maleficent: Mistress of Evil	$87,462	Ready or Not (#3), The Good Liar (#4)
50	15 December 2019	Knives Out	$105,024	
51	22 December 2019	Star Wars: The Rise of Skywalker	$1,259,857	
52	29 December 2019	Star Wars: The Rise of Skywalker	$671,733	

== Highest-grossing films ==
Highest-grossing films of 2019
Rank	Title	Distributor	Domestic gross
1	Toy Story 4	Disney	$28,902,535
2	Avengers: Endgame	Disney	$17,724,843
3	The Lion King	Disney	$15,236,445
4	Spider-Man: Far From Home	Sony	$5,893,786
5	Ralph Breaks the Internet	Disney	$5,446,297
6	Captain Marvel	Disney	$5,419,493
7	Heroic Losers	Warner Bros.	$5,345,618
8	The Secret Life of Pets 2	UIP	$5,318,604
9	Aladdin	Disney	$5,280,461
10	Joker	Warner Bros.	$5,043,516

Highest-grossing films of 2019 by CAEC rating
ATP	Toy Story 4
ATP C/L	Spider-Man: Far From Home
ATP C/R	Aníbal, justo una muerte
SAM 13	Avengers: Endgame
SAM 13 C/R	Annabelle Comes Home
SAM 16	The Mule
SAM 16 C/R	Joker
SAM 18	Clementina

== See also ==
- List of Argentine films of 2019
