= List of Argentine films of 2019 =

A list of Argentine films released in 2019.

== 2019 films ==
=== January–March ===
Opening		Title	Distributor	Director	Country	Ref.
J A N U A R Y	3	Plaza Paris	Primer Plano Film Group	Lucía Murat	BR, PT, AR	
J A N U A R Y	10	50 Chuseok	Los Griegos Producción SRL	Tamae Garateguy	AR	
J A N U A R Y	10	My Days in the Traveling Circus	Rodeo Distribución	Juan Ariel Soto Paz	AR, BO	
J A N U A R Y	10	A oscuras	Primer Plano Film Group	Victoria Chaya Miranda	AR	
J A N U A R Y	17	Anibal, justo una muerte	Independent	Meko Pura	AR	
J A N U A R Y	17	Florianópolis Dream	Cine Tren	Ana Katz	AR, BR	
J A N U A R Y	24	Mujer nómade	Independent	Martin Farina	AR	
J A N U A R Y	24	The Jerusalem of Argentina	Independent	Melina Serber	AR	
J A N U A R Y	24	Un continente incendiándose	Independent	Miguel Zaballos	AR	
J A N U A R Y	31	Alberto Greco. Obra fuera de catálogo	Independent	Paula Pellejero	AR	
J A N U A R Y	31	Anoche	Primer Plano Film Group	Paula Manzone and Nicanor Loreti	AR	
J A N U A R Y	31	Los últimos románticos	Aura Films	Gabriel Drak	AR	
J A N U A R Y	31	Un cine en concreto	Independent	Luz Ruciello	AR	
F E B R U A R Y	7	Atenas	Independent	César González	AR	
F E B R U A R Y	7	El día que resistía	Independent	Alessia Chiesa	AR, FR	
F E B R U A R Y	7	El tío	Primer Plano Film Group	María Eugenia Sueiro	AR	
F E B R U A R Y	7	La nostalgia del centauro	Cine Tren	Nicolás Torchinsky	AR	
F E B R U A R Y	7	Ladrillos capitales	Independent	Gustavo Laskier	AR	
F E B R U A R Y	14	Antonio Gil	Independent	Lía Dansker	AR	
F E B R U A R Y	14	Hora-Día-Mes	Primer Plano Film Group	Diego Bliffeld	AR	
F E B R U A R Y	14	Tampoco tan grandes	Buena Vista International	Federico Sosa	AR	
F E B R U A R Y	21	Happy Hour	Primer Plano Film Group	Eduardo Albergaria	AR, BR	
F E B R U A R Y	21	Leónidas	16M	Miguel Colombo	AR	
F E B R U A R Y	21	Reina de corazones	Independent	Guillermo Bergandi	AR	
F E B R U A R Y	21	Wanderlust, cuerpos en tránsito	Independent	María Pérez Escalá	AR	
F E B R U A R Y	28	Amanecer en mi tierra	Independent	Ulises de la Orden	AR	
F E B R U A R Y	28	Ciclos	Independent	Francisco Pedemonte	AR	
F E B R U A R Y	28	El cuidador	Independent	Rodolfo Pochat	AR	
F E B R U A R Y	28	Entre gatos universalmente pardos	Independent	Ariel Borenstein and Damián Finvar	AR	
F E B R U A R Y	28	Guerrero de norte y sur	Elefante Films	Germán Souza and Mauricio Halek	AR	
F E B R U A R Y	28	La misma sangre	Buena Vista International	Miguel Cohan	AR, CL	
F E B R U A R Y	28	Los árboles	Independent	Mariano Luque	AR	
F E B R U A R Y	28	Memorias de la sangre	Independent	Marcelo Charras	AR	
M A R C H	7	Black or White	Independent	Matías Rispau	AR	
M A R C H	7	Callcenter	3C Films	Federico Velasco and Sergio Estilarte	AR	
M A R C H	7	Fearing Future	Aeroplano	Nacho Sesma	AR	
M A R C H	7	Femicidio. Un caso, múltiples luchas	Independent	Mara Avila	AR	
M A R C H	7	Juntas	996 Films	Nadina Marquisio and Laura Martínez Duque	AR, CO	
M A R C H	7	Olmedo, el rey de la risa	3C Films	Mariano Olmedo	AR	
M A R C H	14	Alicia	Independent	Alejandro Rath	AR	
M A R C H	14	Down para arriba	Kligger Contenidos	Gustavo Garzón	AR	
M A R C H	14	El hermano de Miguel	Fly Films	Mariano Minestrelli	AR	
M A R C H	14	Foto estudio Luisita	Yaguareté Cine	Sol Miraglia and Hugo Manso	AR	
M A R C H	14	Lobos	Primer Plano Film Group	Rodolfo Durán	AR	
M A R C H	14	Un lugar en el tiempo	Independent	Nicolás Purdia and Pablo José Rey	AR	
M A R C H	21	Impresiones obreras	Independent	Hugo Colombini	AR	
M A R C H	21	La feliz, continuidades de la violencia	Independent	Valentín Javier Diment	AR	
M A R C H	21	Yo no me llamo Rubén Blades	Compañía de Cine	Abner Benaim	AR, PA	
M A R C H	21	Yo, mi mujer y mi mujer muerta	Buena Vista International	Santi Amodeo	AR, ES	
M A R C H	28	Candomberos de dos orillas	Independent	Ernesto Gut	AR	
M A R C H	28	El kiosko	Primer Plano Film Group	Pablo Gonzalo Pérez	AR	
M A R C H	28	La guarida del lobo	3C Films	Alex Tossenberger	AR	
M A R C H	28	Yvonne	Independent	María Laura Rubino	AR	

=== April–June ===
Opening		Title	Distributor	Director	Country	Ref.
A P R I L	4	4x4	Buena Vista International	Mariano Cohn	AR, ES	
A P R I L	4	Chaco	Cine Tren	Fausta Quattrini and Danielle Incalcaterra	AR	
A P R I L	4	Eduardo Pavlovsky, resistir cholo	Independent	Miguel Mirra	AR	
A P R I L	8	End of the Century (Fin de siglo)	Alsina 427	Lucio Castro	AR	
A P R I L	11	Clementina	Campo Cine	Jimena Monteoliva	AR	
A P R I L	11	Hojas verde de otoño	Primer Plano Film Group	Julio Midu and Fabio Junco	AR	
A P R I L	18	1100	Cine Tren	Diego Castro	AR	
A P R I L	25	Acá y acullá	Maravillacine	Hernán Khourian	AR	
A P R I L	25	Ausencia de mí	Bellasombra	Melisa Teribili	AR	
A P R I L	25	Estoy acá (Mangui fi)	Jaque Productora	Esteban Kabacznik and Juan Manuel Bramuglia	AR	
A P R I L	25	La experiencia judía, de Basavilbaso a Nueva Amsterdam	Independent	Miguel Kohan	AR	
A P R I L	25	Vida	Independent	María Eugenia Lombardi and Carolina Reynoso	AR	
M A Y	2	El hijo	Energía Entusiasta	Sebastián Schindel	AR	
M A Y	2	La lupa	Independent	Marina Zeising	AR	
M A Y	2	Los miembros de la familia	Cine Tren	Mateo Bendersky	AR	
M A Y	2	Los periféricos	Independent	Los Periféricos	AR	
M A Y	2	Los tiburones	Compañía de Cine	Lucía Garibaldi	AR, UY	
M A Y	2	River, el más grande siempre	Buena Vista International	Luis Alberto Scalella, Marcelo Altmark and Mariano Mucci	AR	
M A Y	2	Traslasierra	Primer Plano Film Group	Juan Sasiaín	AR	
M A Y	9	Abrakadabra	996 Films	Luciano and Nicanor Onetti	AR, NZ	
M A Y	9	Boni Bonita	Compañía de Cine	Daniel Arosa	BR, AR	
M A Y	9	El bosque de los perros	Primer Plano Film Group	Gonzalo Zapico	AR	
M A Y	9	El sonido de los tulipanes	Aura Films	Alberto Masliah	AR	
M A Y	9	Escuela monte	La Granja Cine	Mariano Raffo and Cecilia Cisneros	AR	
M A Y	9	Gran Orquesta	Independent	Peri Azar	AR	
M A Y	9	Murder Me, Monster	Trapecio Cine	Alejandro Fadel	AR, CL, FR	
M A Y	16	Bazán Frías, elogio del crimen	Independent	Juan Mascaró and Lucas García	AR	
M A Y	16	Cuadros en la oscuridad	Noche Creatividad and Cine Tren	Paula Markovitch	AR	
M A Y	16	Dóberman	Cine Tren	Azul Lombardía	AR	
M A Y	16	La cuarta dimensión	Independent	Francisco Bouzas	AR	
M A Y	16	La lección de anatomía	Bellasombra	Agustín Kazah and Pablo Arévalo	AR	
M A Y	16	The Weasel's Tale	BF París	Juan José Campanella	AR, ES	
M A Y	23	Badur Hogar	Cine Tren	Rodrigo Moscoso	AR	
M A Y	23	Infierno grande	Primer Plano Film Group	Alberto Romero	AR	
M A Y	30	A mas tardar	Independent	Mariana Guth	AR	
M A Y	30	Breve historia del planeta verde	3C Films	Santiago Loza	AR, DE, BR, ES	
M A Y	30	Bailar la sangre	Independent	Eloísa Tarruella and Gato Martínez Cantó	AR	
M A Y	30	El Ratón Pérez y los guardianes del libro mágico	Buena Vista International	Juan Pablo Buscarini	AR, ES	
J U N E	6	Blindado	Cine Tren	Eduardo Meneghelli	AR	
J U N E	6	Cuando dejes de quererme	Primer Plano Film Group	Igor Legarreta	AR, ES	
J U N E	6	De nuevo otra vez	Compañía de Cine	Romina Paula	AR	
J U N E	6	La visita	Bellasombra	Jorge Leandro Colás	AR	
J U N E	6	La escuela contra el margen	Independent	Lisandro González Ursi and Diego Carabelli	AR	
J U N E	6	Soy lo que quise ser	Rodeo Distribución	Betina Casanova and Mariana Scarone	AR	
J U N E	13	Encuentro	Independent	Martín Paolorossi and Juan Lupiañez	AR	
J U N E	13	Kollontai, apuntes de resistencia	Independent	Nicolás Méndez Casariego	AR	
J U N E	13	Rapto	Primer Plano Film Group	Frank Pérez-Garland	AR, PE	
J U N E	13	Un suelo lejano	Independent	Gabriel Muro	AR, PY	
J U N E	20	A una legua	Independent	Andrea Krujosky	AR	
J U N E	20	Astrogauchos	Kligger Contenidos	Matías Szulanski	AR	
J U N E	20	El diablo blanco	Primer Plano Film Group	Ignacio Rogers	AR, BR	
J U N E	20	Nada culmina en la víspera	Independent	Florencia Orce and Pablo Moro	AR	
J U N E	27	El ruido son las casas	Independent	Luciana Foglio and Luján Montes	AR	
J U N E	27	La última búsqueda	Independent	Pepe Tobal and Eduardo Sánchez	AR	
J U N E	27	No soy tu mami	United International Pictures	Marcos Carnevale	AR, BR	

=== July–September ===
Opening		Title	Distributor	Director	Country	Ref.
J U L Y	4	Chubut, tierra y libertad	Maravillacine	Carlos Echeverría	AR	
J U L Y	4	Delfín	Primer Plano Film Group	Gaspar Scheuer	AR	
J U L Y	4	Las facultades	Cine Tren	Eloisa Solaas	AR	
J U L Y	4	Perros del fin del mundo	3C Films	Juan Dickinson	AR	
J U L Y	4	Segundo subsuelo	Independent	Oriana Castro and Nicolás Martínez Zemborain	AR	
J U L Y	11	Bikes	3C Films	Manuel Javier García	ES, AR, CN	
J U L Y	11	Encandilan luces, viaje psicotrópico con los psíquicos litoraleños	Bellasombra	Alejandro Gallo Bermúdez	AR	
J U L Y	11	Fragmentos de una amiga desconocida	mitaifilms	Magda Cristina Hernández	AR	
J U L Y	11	Historias breves 17	National Institute of Cinema and Audiovisual Arts	Various	AR	
J U L Y	11	Holy Beasts	Cine Tren	Israel Cárdenas and Laura Amelia Guzmán	DO, AR, MX	
J U L Y	11	La casa en la playa	Cristar Films	July Massaccesi	AR	
J U L Y	11	Un rubio	3C Films	Marco Berger	AR	
J U L Y	18	Volviendo a casa	Independent	Ricardo Preve	AR	
J U L Y	25	Digo la cordillera. Cuadernos de viaje	Independent	Ciro Néstor Novelli	AR	
J U L Y	25	Nueva mente	Independent	Ulises de la Orden	AR	
A U G U S T	1	Esa película que llevo conmigo	Cine Tren	Lucía Ruiz	AR	
A U G U S T	1	La casa de Wannsee	DocBsAs	Poli Martínez Kaplún	AR	
A U G U S T	1	La huella de Tara	Independent	Georgina Barreiro	AR	
A U G U S T	1	Marta Show	Duermevela	Malena Moffatt and Bruno López	AR	
A U G U S T	1	Rebobinado	Independent	Juan Francisco Otaño	AR	
A U G U S T	1	Vigilia en Agosto	Cine Tren	Luis María Mercado	AR	
A U G U S T	8	Cara sucia con la magia de la naturaleza	Primer Plano Film Group	Gastón Gularte	AR	
A U G U S T	8	El día que me muera	3C Films	Néstor Sánchez Sotelo	AR	
A U G U S T	8	Hombres de piel dura	Compañía de Cine	José Celestino Campusano	AR	
A U G U S T	15	Alejandro del Prado, el eslabón perdido	Primer Plano Film Group	Marcelo Schapces and Mariano del Mazo	AR	
A U G U S T	15	El llanto	Independent	Hernán Fernández	AR	
A U G U S T	15	Heroic Losers	Warner Bros.	Sebastián Borensztein	AR, ES	
A U G U S T	15	Pasco, avanzar más allá de la muerte	Independent	Martín Sabio	AR	
A U G U S T	22	Baldío	Cine Tren	Inés de Oliveira Cézar	AR	
A U G U S T	22	La afinadora de árboles	Primer Plano Film Group	Natalia Smirnoff	AR, MX	
A U G U S T	22	La sequía	Aura Films	Martín Jáuregui	AR	
A U G U S T	22	Los índalos	Independent	Santiago Nacif Cabrera, Juan Andrés Martínez Cantó and Roberto Persano	AR	
A U G U S T	29	Cuando los hombres quedan solos	Primer Plano Film Group	Fernando Martínez	BO, AR, CO, ES	
A U G U S T	29	Margen de error	Primer Plano Film Group	Liliana Paolinelli	AR	
A U G U S T	29	Mekong-Paraná: Los últimos laosianos	Independent	Ignacio Luccisano	AR	
A U G U S T	29	Paso San Ignacio	Independent	Pablo Reyero	AR	
A U G U S T	29	Shalom Taiwan	Digicine	Walter Tejblum	AR	
S E P T E M B E R	5	El retiro	Buena Vista International	Ricardo Díaz Iacoponi	AR	
S E P T E M B E R	5	Los payasos	Independent	Lucas Bucci and Tomás Sposato	AR	
S E P T E M B E R	5	Matar a un muerto	Cine Tren	Hugo Giménez	AR, FR, PY	
S E P T E M B E R	5	Paternal	Bellasombra	Eduardo Yedlin	AR	
S E P T E M B E R	5	Proyecto 55	Independent	Miguel Angel Colombo	AR	
S E P T E M B E R	12	Bu y Bu: Una aventura interdimensional	Independent	Eduardo Rodríguez Bossut	AR	
S E P T E M B E R	12	Claudia	Aura Films	Juan Sebastián De Caro	AR	
S E P T E M B E R	12	La internacional del fin del mundo	Independent	Violeta Bruck and Javier Gabino	AR	
S E P T E M B E R	12	Todo por el ascenso	3C Films	Jorge Piwowartski	AR	
S E P T E M B E R	12	Witch	BF París	Marcelo Páez Cubells	AR	
S E P T E M B E R	19	El desentierro	Primer Plano Film Group	Nacho Ruipérez	AR, ES	
S E P T E M B E R	19	Iniciales S.G.	Digicine	Rania Attieh and Daniel Anthony García	AR	
S E P T E M B E R	19	La deuda	Lita Stantic Producciones	Gustavo Salvador Fontán	AR	
S E P T E M B E R	19	Latinoamérica: Territorio en disputa	Independent	Nicolás Trotta and Esteban Alfredo Cuevas	AR	
S E P T E M B E R	19	Magalí	Primer Plano Film Group / Cine Tren	Juan Pablo Di Bitonto	AR	
S E P T E M B E R	19	Palestina, imágenes robadas	Aura Films	Rodrigo Vázquez	UK, AR	
S E P T E M B E R	26	El panelista	Independent	Juan Manuel Repetto	AR	
S E P T E M B E R	26	¿Quién mató a mi hermano?	Cine Tren	Ana Fraile and Lucas Scavino	AR	
S E P T E M B E R	26	The Moneychanger	Buena Vista International	Federico Veiroj	AR	

=== October–December ===
Opening		Title	Distributor	Director	Country	Ref.
O C T O B E R	3	El prof3s1on4l	Cinemilagro	Martín Farina	AR	
O C T O B E R	3	Porno para principiantes	Primer Plano Film Group	Carlos Ameglio	AR, BR, UY	
O C T O B E R	3	Punto muerto	Aura Films	Daniel de la Vega	AR	
O C T O B E R	3	Que sea ley	Cine Tren	Juan Diego Fidel Solanas	AR, FR, UY	
O C T O B E R	10	La hermandad	Bellasombra	Martín Falci	AR	
O C T O B E R	10	Monos	Campo Cine / Cine Tren	Alejandro Landes and Alexis Dos Santos	AR, CO, NL, DE, SE, UY, US	
O C T O B E R	10	Pistolero	Primer Plano Film Group	Nicolás Galvagno	AR	
O C T O B E R	10	Retrato de propietarios	Independent	Joaquín Maito	AR	
O C T O B E R	17	Construcciones	Periferia Cine	Fernando Martín Restelli	AR	
O C T O B E R	17	Fondo	Independent	Alejandro Bercovich	AR, QA	
O C T O B E R	17	Los hipócritas	El Calefón	Santiago Sgarlatta and Carlos Ignacio Trioni	AR	
O C T O B E R	17	Rosita	Cine Tren	Verónica Chen	AR	
O C T O B E R	24	¿Yo te gusto?	Primer Plano Film Group	Edgardo González Amer	AR	
O C T O B E R	24	El rocío	Compañía de Cine	Emiliano Grieco	AR	
O C T O B E R	24	Exilio en África	Independent	Ernesto Aguilar and Marcela Inés Suppicich	AR	
O C T O B E R	24	Stand Up Villero	3C Films	Jorge Croce	AR	
O C T O B E R	24	Una de nosotras	Bellasombra	Soledad Castro Lazaroff	AR, UY	
O C T O B E R	31	Candy Bar	CineWorld	Alejandra Szeplaki	VE, AR	
O C T O B E R	31	Crímenes imposibles	BF París	Hernán Findling	AR	
O C T O B E R	31	Desertor	Cierren	Pablo Brusa	AR	
O C T O B E R	31	La vida en común	Independent	Ezequiel Yanco	AR	
O C T O B E R	31	Mujer salvaje	Independent	Nadia Martínez	AR	
N O V E M B E R	7	A Girl's Band	Independent	Marilina Giménez	AR	
N O V E M B E R	7	Amor de película	Buena Vista International	Sebastián Mega Rodríguez	AR	
N O V E M B E R	7	Cartero	Cine Tren	Emiliano Serra	AR	
N O V E M B E R	7	La forma de las horas	Independent	Paula de Luque	AR	
N O V E M B E R	7	La vida en común	Independent	Ezequiel Yanco	AR	
N O V E M B E R	7	Los Knacks: Déjame en el pasado	Primer Plano Film Group	Mariano and Gabriel Nesci	AR	
N O V E M B E R	7	Los prohibidos	Cine Tren	Andrea Schellemberg	AR	
N O V E M B E R	7	Mujer medicina	Independent	Daiana Rosenfeld	AR	
N O V E M B E R	7	Piedra, papel y tijera	APIMA	Macarena García Lenzi and Martin Blousson	AR	
N O V E M B E R	7	Un gauchito Gil	Primer Plano Film Group	Joaquin Pedretti	AR	
N O V E M B E R	14	De cerca nadie es normal	Independent	Marcela Villarino	AR	
N O V E M B E R	14	El plan divino	Aura Films	Víctor Laplace	AR	
N O V E M B E R	14	Los adoptantes	Cine Tren	Daniel Gimelberg	AR	
N O V E M B E R	14	Los últimos	Bellasombra	Pablo Pivetta and Nicolás Rodríguez Fuchs	AR	
N O V E M B E R	14	Taxi a Gibraltar	Aura Films	Alejo Flah	AR, ES	
N O V E M B E R	21	4 metros	Primer Plano Film Group	Francisco Palazzo	AR	
N O V E M B E R	21	Apurímac. El dios que habla.	Primer Plano Film Group	Miguel Mato	AR	
N O V E M B E R	21	Cuerpos marcados	Independent	Ciro Néstor Novelli and Mariangeles San Martín	AR	
N O V E M B E R	21	El hombre del futuro	Compañía de Cine	Felipe Ríos	AR	
N O V E M B E R	21	Instrucciones para la poligamia	Cine Tren	Sebastián Sarquís	AR	
N O V E M B E R	21	Los sonámbulos	Digicine	Paula Hernández	AR, UY	
N O V E M B E R	28	El cuidado de los otros	Cine Tren	Mariano González	AR	
N O V E M B E R	28	El secreto de Julia	Independent	Ernesto Aguilar	AR	
N O V E M B E R	28	Lectura según Justino	Primer Plano Film Group	Arnaldo André	AR	
D E C E M B E R	5	Ciegos	Campo Cine / Cine Tren	Fernando Zuber	AR	
D E C E M B E R	5	El Patalarga	Primer Plano Film Group	Mercedes Moreira	AR	
D E C E M B E R	5	Las buenas intenciones	Cine Tren	Ana García Baya	AR	
D E C E M B E R	12	El gran combo	Kligger Contenidos	Matías Szulanski	AR	
D E C E M B E R	12	Hogar	Campo Cine / Cine Tren	Maura Delpero	AR, IT	
D E C E M B E R	12	Inner Fires	Independent	Various	AR	
D E C E M B E R	12	La sabiduría	Primer Plano Film Group	Eduardo Pinto	AR	
D E C E M B E R	12	Lo intangible	Bellasombra	Matilde Michanie	AR	
D E C E M B E R	12	Raúl, la democracia desde adentro	Cine Tren	Juan Baldana & Christian Rémoli	AR	
D E C E M B E R	19	La botera	Compañía de Cine	Sabrina Blanco	AR, BR	
D E C E M B E R	19	Lejos de Pekín	Primer Plano Film Group	Maximiliano González	AR	
D E C E M B E R	19	Mangoré, por amor al arte	Aura Films	Luis R. Vera	AR, PY	
D E C E M B E R	19	We Are the Heat	Primer Plano Film Group	Jorge Navas	CO, AR	

== 2019 box office ==
Since January 1 until March 9, Argentine films sold less than 200,000 tickets, only a 2.5% of the total ticket sales (7,790,000). In the previous year, the share of Argentine cinema in the local box office was almost 15%. In contrast, there was an increment of 19% in the number of films released in the same period compared to the past year.

=== Most successful films ===
Highest-grossing Argentine films of 2019 by ticket sales
Rank	Title	Distributor	Tickets sold	Ref.
1.	Heroic Losers	Warner Bros.	1,781,152	
2.	The Weasel's Tale	BF Paris	564,025	
3.	4x4	Buena Vista International	317,390	
4.	No soy tu mami	United International Pictures	218,439	
5.	La misma sangre	Buena Vista International	90,781	
6.	El hijo	Energía Entusiasta	72,187	
7.	River, el más grande siempre	Buena Vista International	53,566	
8.	El retiro	Buena Vista International	47,094	
9.	Witch	BF París	40,121	
10.	Florianópolis Dream	Cine Tren	39,156	

== See also ==
- 2019 in Argentina
- List of 2019 box office number-one films in Argentina
- List of Argentine films of 2018
- List of Argentine films of 2020
