= List of 2020 box office number-one films in Brazil =

This is a list of films which placed number-one at the weekend box office in Brazil during 2020. The COVID-19 pandemic closed all theaters by the third week of March. Box office numbers only returned in June with drive-in theaters, yet with only catalog titles. Only by the second semester operations returned as normal, including new releases.

== Number-one films ==
†	This implies the highest-grossing movie of the year.

#	Weekend end date	Film	Box office
1	January 5, 2020	Frozen II†	US$8,772,274
2	January 12, 2020	My Mom Is a Character 3	US$5,415,019
3	January 19, 2020	Jumanji: The Next Level	US$4,183,542
4	January 26, 2020	Jumanji: The Next Level	US$2,239,626
5	February 2, 2020	Bad Boys for Life	US$1,690,443
6	February 9, 2020	Birds of Prey	US$2,490,062
7	February 16, 2020	Sonic the Hedgehog	US$2,710,115
8	February 23, 2020	Sonic the Hedgehog	US$2,650,583
9	March 1, 2020	Sonic the Hedgehog	US$1,183,276.13
10	March 8, 2020	Onward	US$1,008,063
11	March 15, 2020	Bloodshot	US$494,436
12	March 22, 2020	The Invisible Man	US$220
There is no box office data between March and June due to the COVID-19 pandemic.
23	June 7, 2020	Wonder Park	US$4,228.76
24	June 14, 2020	A Star Is Born	US$10,028.75
25	June 21, 2020	Jumanji: Next Level	US$5,402.33
26	June 28, 2020	The Invisible Man	US$3,174
27	July 5, 2020	Shazam!	US$3,511
28	July 12, 2020	My Mom Is a Character 3	US$4,477
29	July 19, 2020	How to Train Your Dragon: The Hidden World	US$5,455
30	July 26, 2020	Spider-Man: Far From Home	US$2,719
31	August 2, 2020	The Lion King	US$6,148
32	August 9, 2020	The Lion King	US$3,356
33	August 16, 2020	Onward	US$2,679
34	August 23, 2020	The Secret Life of Pets 2	US$3,426
35	August 30, 2020	The Heist of the Century	US$5,194
36	September 6, 2020	Queen of Spades: Through the Looking Glass	US$11,123
37	September 13, 2020	Scoob!	US$26,943.78
38	September 20, 2020	Scoob!	US$25,036
39	September 27, 2020	Fantasy Island	US$20,815
40	October 4, 2020	Fantasy Island	US$30,275
41	October 11, 2020	Scoob!	US$74,699
42	October 18, 2020	Fantasy Island	US$53,335
43	October 25, 2020	The New Mutants	US$183,287
44	November 1, 2020	Tenet	US$356,869
45	November 8, 2020	Tenet	US$200,837
46	November 15, 2020	Tenet	US$125,236
47	November 22, 2020	The Witches	US$209,679
48	November 29, 2020	The Witches	US$158,365
49	December 6, 2020	Trolls World Tour	US$152,899
50	December 13, 2020	Trolls World Tour	US$119,020
51	December 20, 2020	Wonder Woman 1984	US$1,660,175
52	December 27, 2020	Wonder Woman 1984	US$527,624.77

== Highest-grossing films ==
Highest-grossing films of 2020 (in-year releases)
Rank	Title	Distributor	Domestic gross
1.	Frozen II	Disney	$23,531,631
2.	Jumanji: The Next Level	Sony	$10,274,519
3.	Sonic the Hedgehog	Paramount	$10,181,923
4.	Wonder Woman 1984	Warner Bros.	$6,900,000
5.	Birds of Prey	Warner Bros.	$5,689,847
6.	1917	Universal	$5,625,004
7.	Bad Boys For Life	Sony	$4,010,478
8.	Dolittle	Universal	$3,085,032
9.	Gretel & Hansel	Imagem Filmes	$2,445,671
10.	The Invisible Man	Universal	$2,208,719
