= Vézina =

Vézina is a surname. Notable people with the surname include:

- Antoine Vézina (21st century), Canadian actor
- Frédérique Vézina (born c. 1977), Canadian singer
- Georges Vézina (1887–1926), Canadian professional ice hockey goaltender
- Joseph Vézina (1849–1924), Canadian conductor
- Monique Vézina (1935–2024), Canadian politician
- Pierre Vézina (1772–1852), Canadian politician

== See also ==
- Vezina Trophy, named after Georges Vézina
