= 2nd Seville International Short Film Festival =

2024 film award

- Opening film: 8:19
- Closing film: Facies
- Location: Seville, Spain
- Directors: Nick Kremm
- Hosted by: Fran Expósito; María Gandiaga
- Festival date: 16–20 September 2024

Seville International Short Film Festival
- 1st

The 2nd Seville International Short Film Festival (Note: Held as the 2nd Akida International Film Festival) took place from 16 to September 20 2024, in Seville, Spain.

The projections were made at the Avenida 5 Cines while the final award ceremony took place at the Cine Cervantes on September 20 with Pablo Ardana as the guest singer.

== Inclusive & cultural conference ==
On September 17, 2024, the festival and the COCEMFE (Federación Provincial de Asociaciones de Personas con Discapacidad Física y Orgánica de Sevilla) organized the "Inclusive & Cultural Conference" and it took place at Seville's Oficina de Turismo.

The directors and hosters talked about the inclusivity of disabled people on film and society, and they projected two short films that handled the subject matter (Cabeza y Corazón (Head and Heart) & La Vida Entre Dos Noches (The Life Between Two Nights).

== Juries ==
- Helena Kaittani, Spanish actress
- Dani Sa-Lo, Spanish cinematographer
- María Pasadas, Spanish director
- Juan Carlos González, Spanish film critic
- Pedro Verdún, Spanish director

== Selections ==
The short films in competition were divided into several selections:

=== Drama selection ===
English title	Original title	Director(s)	Production country(ies)
8:19 (opening film)		María Guerra	Spain
Scrapping	Desguace	David Orea	Spain
Plein Air		David Orea	Spain
Thanks for the Cigarette	Danke für die Zigarette	Carlos García-Espejo Sayago	Germany
Week 12	Semana 12	Isabel Delclaux	Spain
Who	Quien	Carlos Martín	Spain

=== Thriller selection ===
English title	Original title	Director(s)	Production country(ies)
Carroña		Elías Pérez	Spain
Facies (closing film)	El Semblante	Raúl Cerezo & Carlos Moriana	Spain
In Rage	A Rabia	Alberto Díaz López	Spain
House of Brotherly Love		Max Kane	United States
The Replacement	El Remplazo	Alberto Ortega	Spain
There Are No Ghosts	No Hay Fantamas	Nacho Solana	Spain

=== Comedy selection ===
English title	Original title	Director(s)	Production country(ies)
Anticlímax	Anticlimax	Néstor López & Oscár Romero	Spain
In a second	En un segundo	Pablo Fajardo	Spain
Mid-class Psycopaths	Psicópatas de Clase Media	Álvaro Herrero & Héctor Amado	Spain
The Pure Reality	La Pura Realidad	Joaquín Gómez	Spain
This is not Norway	Esto no es Noruega	Alicia Albares & Paco Cavero	Spain
White Dragon	Dragón Blanco	Rodrigo E. Marini Valsechi & David Santamaría González	Spain

=== Romance selection ===
English title	Original title	Director(s)	Production country(ies)
Everything is Invented	Dena Asmatuta Dago	Jone Arriola Lobete	Spain
I Love every Atom of your Body	Amo Cada Átomo de tu Cuerpo	Alejandro Lobo	Spain
Bird Drone		Radheya Jang Jegatheva	Australia
Revelation of John	Zjavenie Jana	Andrej Kolencik	Slovakia

=== Young filmmaker selection ===
English title	Original title	Director(s)	Production country(ies)
The Calendar	日历	Leo Donovan	China
Onán		Diego Toussiant Ortiz	Mexico
The Other	El Otro	Marc G. Ros	Spain
Quique		Pedro Tamames	United States, Spain
Sockets?	Enchufes?	Alica Arwgar	Spain
TARA		Daniel Filloy & Rebeca Tella	Spain

=== Selection of short film made by students ===
English title	Original title	Director(s)	Production country(ies)
The Borders Never Die	مرزها هرگز نمی میرند	Hamidreza Arjomandi	Iran
Gennady at the Phone	геннадий у телефона	Ilya Vladimirovich Ponomarev	Russia
Hard to Swallow	Mal Trago	Santino Taratuto	Argentina
If I Knew	Ean Hzepa	Piro Gjylameti	Greece
Lola Scissors	Lola Tijeras	María Berr	Spain
Trambled	Zgazene	Aleksandar Teokarević	Serbia

=== Sevillian competition ===
English title	Original title	Director(s)	Production country(ies)
The Globe	El Globo	Hugo Suárez	Spain
The Life Between Two Nights	La Vida Entre Dos Noches	Antonio Cuesta	Spain
Our Girl	Nuestra Niña	Rebeca Márquez	Spain
Projections	Proyecciones	Raúl Márquez	Spain
Thick	Vástago	David Luque	Spain
Uranites		Marina Arenas	Spain

=== Documentary selection ===
English title	Original title	Director(s)	Production country(ies)
The Building	El Bloque	Fermín Gil	Spain
Daida back to the Ocean		Pablo Ramírez Bolaños	Spain
The Last Spin	El Último Giro	Adrian Castro Viejo	Spain
The Perfect Shot: Antarctica		Quinn Halleck	United States
Second II	Segunda II	Anita Pico	Spain
Senegal: A Dream of Departure & Arrival	Senegal: Un viaje de ida y vuelta	Marcos Gualda	Spain

== Awards ==
Winners are listed first, highlighted in boldface, and indicated with a double dagger (‡).

**Best Sevillian Competition Short Film**: **Uranites – Marina Arenas ‡**; The Globe - Hugo Suárez; The Life Between Two Nights - Antonio Cuesta; Our Girl - Rebeca Márquez; Projections - Raúl Márquez; Thick - David Luque	**Best Drama Short Film**: **Thanks for the Cigarette – Carlos García-Espejo Sayago ‡**; 8:19 - María Guerra; Plein Air - Raúl Herrera; Scrapping - David Orea; Week 12 - Isabel Delclaux
**Best Thriller Short Film**: **Carroña – Elías Pérez ‡**; House of Brotherly Love - Max Kane; In Rage - Al Díaz; There are No Ghosts - Nacho Solana	**Best Comedy Short Film**: **Anticlimax – Óscar Romero ‡**; White Dragon - David Santamaría; In a Second - Pablo Fajardo; This is not Norway - Paco Cavero; The Pure Reality - Joaquín Gómez
**Best Romance Short Film**: **I Love Every Atom of Your Body – Alejandro Lobo ‡**; Bird Drone - Radheya Jegatheva; Everything is Invented - Jone Arriola Lobete; Revelation of John - Andrej Kolencik	**Best Documentary Short Film**: **Second II – Anita Pico ‡**; The Building - Fermín Gil; Daida Back to the Ocean - Pablo Ramírez Bolaños; The Perfect Shot: Antarctica - Quinn Halleck
**Best Young Filmmaker Short Film**: **Sockets? – Alicia Arwgar ‡**; Onán - Diego Toussiant Ortiz; The Other - Marc G. Ros; Quique - Pedro Tamames	**Best Short Film Made by Students**: **Lola Scissors – María Berr ‡**; The Borders Never Die - Hamidreza Arjomandi; Gennady at the Phone - Ilya Vladimirovich Ponomarev; Hard to Swallow - Santino Taratuto; If I Knew - Piro Gjylameti
**Best Director**: **Marina Arenas – Uranites ‡**; Marc G. Ros - The Other; Antonio Cuesta - The Life Between Two Nights; Isabel Delclaux - Week 12	**Best Actor**: **Manolo Solo – Anticlimax ‡**; Jon Ander Urresti - Everything is Invented; José Manuel Poga - The Life Between Two Nights; Adrià Salazar - The Other
**Best Actress**: **Miriam Díaz-Aroca – The Pure Reality ‡**; Eva Pavlíková - Revelation of John; Ingrid García-Jonsson - Scrapping; Simone Sojo - Uranites	**Best Cinematography**: **Revelation of John – Michaela Klanicová ‡**; In Rage - Miguel Ángel Viñas; The Perfect Shot: Antarctica - Quinn Halleck; Scrapping - Pablo Taín
**Best Screenplay**: **Uranites – Marina Arenas ‡**; Onán - Diego Toussiant Ortiz; The Other - Marc G. Ros; There Are No Ghosts - Jordi Farga	**Public Award**: **Our Girl – Rebeca Márquez**

=== Shorts films with multiple wins & nominations ===
Films with multiple nominations
Nominations	Film
4	The Other
4	Uranites
3	The Life Between Two Nights
3	Scrappings
3	Revelation of John
2	Anticlimax
2	Everything is Invented
2	In Rage
2	The Perfect Shot: Antarctica
2	The Pure Reality
2	There Are No Ghosts
2	Onán
2	Week 12

Films with multiple wins
Wins	Film
3	Uranites
2	Anticlimax
