= Frédérique Vézina =

Canadian operatic soprano (born c. 1977)

Frédérique Vézina (born c. 1977) is a Canadian operatic soprano. Vézina gained recognition when she made her Canadian Opera Company debut in 2002–2003 as Lisa and Mascha in Tchaikovsky's The Queen of Spades. Critics hailed the arrival of a major presence on the operatic stage. Critic Robert Everett-Green of The Globe and Mail praised her "big Act III aria" as "eloquent testimony to the character's own addiction to emotional gambling." She was cast in the Canadian debut of The Handmaid's Tale in 2004. She was featured as Ellen Orford in Benjamin Britten's Peter Grimes and Belinda in Dido and Aeneas. Vézina played Filumena at the National Arts Centre 28 April 2005 and 30 April.

== Career ==
Born in Montreal, Vézina attended the F.A.C.E. high school for performing arts, and graduated from CÉGEP Vanier College. Vézina completed a Bachelor of Music Degree at the Schulich School of Music of McGill University in 2002. She placed first for three consecutive years at the National Association of Teachers of Singing competition (1996, 1997, and 1999) and was awarded the Most Promising Singer prize in 1997. In 2002, at the Trois-Rivières Symphony competition, she was awarded the Grand Prize as well as a recital broadcast on CBC Radio. Vézina placed first at the National Music Festival competition in Calgary as well as in the Concours International de Chant de Marmande (France). She was a Metropolitan Opera semi-finalist in 2004 and a winner of the Début Inc Young Artists Competition.

Vézina has collaborated with internationally renowned conductors including Richard Bradshaw, James Conlon, Yannick Nézet-Séguin, Hans Fricke, Bernard Labadie, Jacques Lacombe, Kent Nagano, Peter Oundjian, Yoav Talmi, Bramwell Tovey, and Timothy Vernon. Her most notable roles include, Mimi (La Bohème), Liza (Queen of Spades), Tatyana (Eugene Onegin), Donna Elvira (Don Giovanni), Contessa (Le nozze di Figaro), Ellen Orford (Peter Grimes) and the creation of Lillian Alling (Lillian Alling).

Vézina received a Graduate Diploma in Opera from The Juilliard School of Music and was a lecturer at University of Western Ontario since 2011. She has been a Sessional Voice Instructor at the University of Toronto since 2013.

== See also ==
- Music of Canada
- List of Canadian musicians
