= Sweet Home (2015 film) =

- Directed by: Rafa Martínez
- Written by: Rafa Martínez; Teresa de Rosendo; Ángel Agudo
- Starring: Ingrid García Jonsson; Bruno Sevilla; Oriol Tarrida; Eduardo Lloveras; Miguel Ángel Alarcón; Luka Peros; José María Blanco; Mariona Perrier
- Production companies: Castelao Pictures; Film Produkcja
- Distributed by: Filmax (es)
- Release date: 8 May 2015 (Spain)
- Countries: Spain; Poland
- Language: English

Sweet Home is a 2015 Spanish-Polish horror film directed by Rafa Martínez and starring Ingrid García Jonsson and Bruno Sevilla.

== Plot ==
Alicia, a real estate valuator, decides to occupy a creepy apartment to give a surprise birthday celebration to her boyfriend Simón. The last resident in the building is killed by hooded individuals and Alicia and Simón are assaulted.

== Cast ==
- Ingrid García Jonsson as Alicia
- Bruno Sevilla as Simón
- Oriol Tarrida as The Liquidator
- Eduardo Lloveras as Encapuchado 1
- Miguel Ángel Alarcón as Encapuchado 2
- Luka Peros as Encapuchado 3
- José María Blanco as Sr. Ramón
- Mariona Perrier as Sra. Carmen

== Production ==
The screenplay was penned by Rafa Martínez alongside Teresa de Rosendo and Ángel Agudo. A Spanish-Polish co-production, the film was produced by Castelao Pictures (Filmax) and Film Produkcja, with participation of TVE. It was shot in English in Barcelona.

== Release ==
Distributed by Filmax, the film was theatrically released in Spain on 8 May 2015.

== Reception ==
Jonathan Holland of The Hollywood Reporter described the watching experience as "enjoyable nonsense", considering that García Jonsson's performance "keeps all the nonsense just about grounded", carrying the film as a "credible and exciting Final Girl" whereas Oriol Tarrida ("The Liquidator") "does a nicely charismatic job of his liquidating".

Sergio F. Pinilla of Cinemanía scored 2½ out of 5 stars, considering that "as energetic as it is reiterative", Sweet Home takes over successful horror film templates (REC, High Tension, Inside), but—bar some cinematography solutions—"fails to break those physical barriers that lead to the fourth dimension of horror".

Jordi Batlle Caminal of Fotogramas rated the film 3 out of 5 stars, and considered that, while warning about taking it seriously, it is "more than enough" with the "attractive production design", an "elegant direction" and a "grand guignol" finale, to the delight of genre fans.

== See also ==
- List of Spanish films of 2015
