= Ingrid García-Jonsson =

Spanish actress

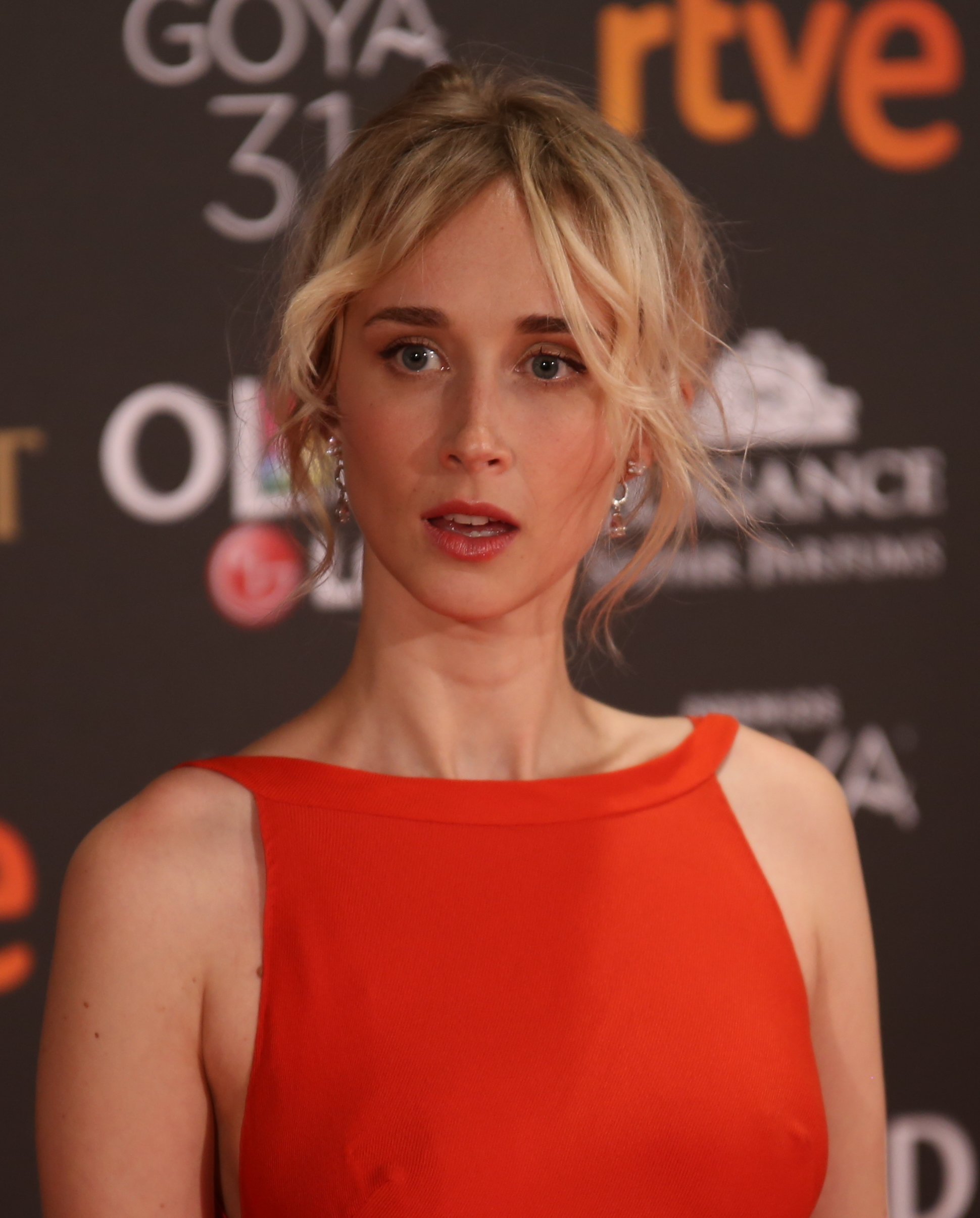
- Born: Ingrid García Jonsson; 6 September 1989 (age 36); Skellefteå, Sweden
- Years active: 1995–present

Ingrid García-Jonsson (born 6 September 1989) is a Swedish-Spanish actress. She was nominated to the Goya Award for Best New Actress for her performance in Beautiful Youth (2014).

== Early life ==
Born in northern Sweden to a Spanish father and a Swedish mother, García-Jonsson moved with her parents to Seville in Spain at a young age. García-Jonsson studied architecture, and first worked as a waitress in a bar.

== Career ==
García-Jonsson made her film debut as in Okupados (2011). She received her first major role in Beautiful Youth, which premiered at the 2014 Cannes Film Festival and received good reviews.

García-Jonsson became well known as an actress in independent films, and was nominated to Feroz Awards, Forqué Awards, Gaudí Awards, and Goya Awards.

In the film Knight and Day (2010), García-Jonsson was the stuntwoman for Cameron Diaz.

García-Jonsson played Amalia along Carlos Areces and Oscar Martínez in Me, Myself and My Dead Wife (2019), directed by Santiago Amodeo. She also appeared in political satire comedy The Little Switzerland (2019), portraying Nathalie, a secretary of the ayuntamiento of Tellería (a Castilian municipality surrounded by the Basque Country) who is keen on the village joining the Swiss Confederation. She featured as Eva alongside Verónica Forqué, Rosa Maria Sardà and David Verdaguer in So My Grandma's a Lesbian! (2019) by Ángeles Reiné.

In October 2020, she began shooting Álex de la Iglesia's slasher Venicephrenia, portraying Isa, a Spanish tourist in Venice about to get married. In July of the same year, she was reported to have joined the shooting of workplace comedy film Camera Cafe, la película.

In 2024, she was announced to have been cast to portray singer Tamara (later known as Yurena) in the streaming series Superestar. She became a member of the European Film Academy in 2026.

== Filmography ==
=== Film ===
Year	Title	Role	Notes	Ref.
2011	Okupados		Feature film debut	
2014	Eryka's Eyes	Eryka		
2014	Hermosa juventud (Beautiful Youth)	Natalia		
2014	Todos tus secretos			
2015	Sweet Home	Alicia		
2015	Berserker	Mireia		
2016	Toro	Estrella		
2016	Acantilado (The Cliff)	Cordelia		
2016	Gernika (Guernica)	Marta		
2017	Zona hostil (Rescue Under Fire)	Cabo Sánchez ('Corporal Sánchez')		
2018	En las estrellas			
2018	Ana de día (Ana by Day)	Ana / Nina		
2019	Love Me Not	Salomé		
2019	Taxi a Gibraltar (Taxi to Gibraltar)	Sandra Sánchez		
2019	La pequeña Suiza (The Little Switzerland)	Nathalie		
2019	Salir del ropero (So My Grandma's a Lesbian!)	Eva		
2019	Yo, mi mujer y mi mujer muerta (Me, Myself and My Dead Wife)	Amalia		
2020	El arte de volver (The Art of Return)	Ana		
2020	Explota, explota (My Heart Goes Boom!)	María		
2021	Veneciafrenia (Venicephrenia)	Isa		
2022	Nosotros no nos mataremos con pistolas (We Won't Kill Each Other with Guns)	Blanca		
2022	Camera Café, la película	Déborah		
2023	The Last Kingdom: Seven Kings Must Die	Brand		
2023	Un amor	Lara		
2024	Una ballena (A Whale)	Ingrid		
2026	Bonded	Anna heller		

=== TV series ===
- Rafaela Y Su Loco Mundo (2025) as Rafaela
- Superestar (2025) as Marimar Cuena Seisdedos 'Tamara'
- Un cuento perfecto (2023) as Candela
- Instinto (2019) as Carol
- Limbo (2018) as Lidia Ronco
- Apaches (2015–2017) as Miranda
- Aliados (2014) as Bianca Rock
- Tierra de lobos (2013) as Pepi
- Con pelos en la lengua (2013) as Sara
- Los Cuervo: ¡Pillados! (2011) as Fan Pop4You

== Accolades ==
Year	Award	Category	Work	Result	Ref.
2015	20th Forqué Awards	Best Actress	Beautiful Youth	Nominated	
2015	2nd Feroz Awards	Best Main Actress in a Film	Beautiful Youth	Nominated	
2015	7th Gaudí Awards	Best Actress	Beautiful Youth	Nominated	
2015	70th CEC Medals	Best New Actress	Beautiful Youth	Nominated	
2015	29th Goya Awards	Best New Actress	Beautiful Youth	Nominated	
2024	32nd Actors and Actresses Union Awards	Best Film Actress in a Minor Role	Un amor	Nominated	
2025	31st Forqué Awards	Best Actress in a Series	Superstar	Nominated	
2026	13th Feroz Awards	Best Main Actress in a Series	Superstar	Nominated	
2026	34th Actors and Actresses Union Awards	Best Television Actress in a Leading Role	Superstar	Won	
