= Living Stars =

- Directed by: Gastón Duprat & Mariano Cohn
- Screenplay by: Andrés Duprat
- Edited by: Jerónimo Carranza; Klaus Borges Baz; Martín Briano
- Music by: Maxi Trusso
- Production company: Televisión Abierta
- Release date: January 17, 2014 (Sundance)
- Running time: 63 minutes
- Country: Argentina
- Language: English

Living Stars is a 2014 Argentine documentary film co-directed by Gastón Duprat and Mariano Cohn. The film had its premiere at the 2014 Sundance Film Festival on January 17, 2014.

The film later screened at 2014 Hot Docs Canadian International Documentary Festival on April 25, 2014.

== Synopsis ==
In Buenos Aires, real people of all ages are dancing in front of the camera without any inhibitions.

== Reception ==
John DeFore in his review for The Hollywood Reporter said, "Buoyant and often funny, it will be a welcome palate-cleanser at fests; video prospects are iffier, as this one all but demands to be seen with a crowd." Amy Nicholson of LA Weekly wrote, "Magically, this story-less montage becomes one of the most cerebral headtrips of Sundance. Living Stars is both dozens of mini-movies and no movie at all." Phil Brown in his review for Point of View called it "endlessly entertaining".
