= Nick Kremm =

Greek filmmaker and entrepreneur

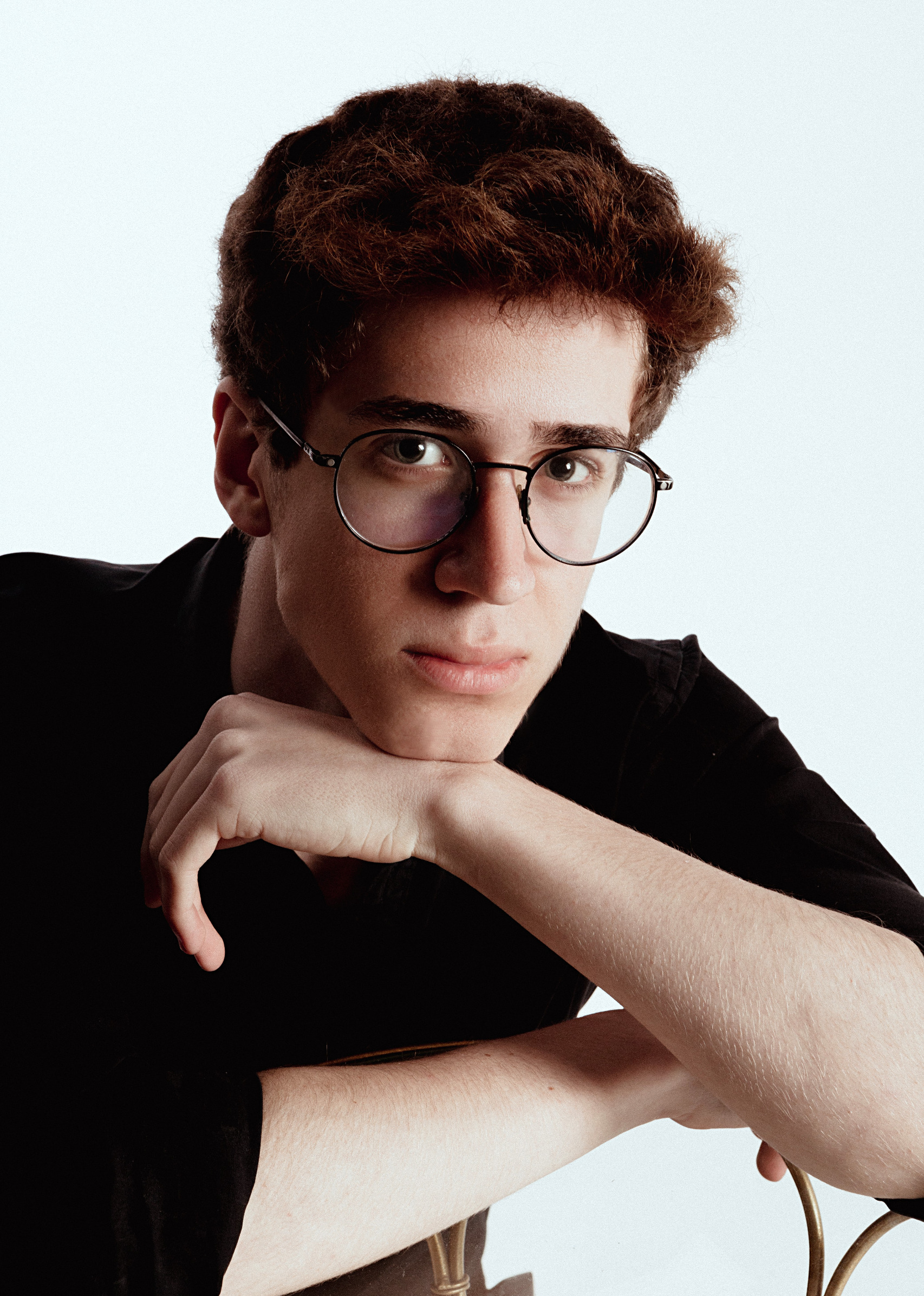
- Nick Kremm in 2024
- Born: Nikolaos Kremmydas; February 25, 2006 (age 20); Athens, Greece
- Occupations: Filmmaker, musician, actor, entrepreneur
- Years active: 2020–present
- Known for: Seville International Short Film Festival
- Partner: Neveen Hisham (2023–present)

Nikolaos Kremmydas (born February 25, 2006), known professionally as Nick Kremm, is a Greek filmmaker, actor, musician and entrepreneur known for creating and being the CEO of the Seville International Short Film Festival.

== Early life and education ==
Nikos Kremmydas was born in Athens, Greece. As a kid he showed an interest in music, playing the violin since he was 6 and at 12 he gave it up to change to saxophone. He moved with his family to Seville, Spain in 2019 where he expanded his artistic routes into painting and specially filmmaking, where he made several short films with his family and friends. Between 2022 and 2024, he attended four different schools, including a period in 2022 where he lived in Bergen, Norway as an exchange student.

== Career ==
In 2022, he started working with Spanish independent filmmaker Agustín Claros, co-producing and creating posters for some short films and was also a camera assistant on his feature-length film The Reason Found by the Guilty Ones where he also made a cameo.

In that year, he met Dimitris Pontikakis Batana with whom he founded Akida Corporation, a youth media company, which later became the Akida International Film Festival by the next year. At just 16 years old, Nick, with financial support from his parents, formalized the festival, sponsored by Unión Cine Ciudad. The first edition of Akida took place from September 2 to 9, 2023, at Avenida 5 Cines and Multicines Metromar, marking a success for the first edition.

In that year they made a short film titled "Janu's Mask", it was written by Pontikakis and directed and produced by Kreem and premiered on September 6, 2023, at the 1st Akida International Film Festival, out of competition. A month later of its premiere, it was digitally released for rent on Amazon Prime Video in the US and UK.

During his stay as an exchange student in Norway, he was cinematographer on the cancelled short film "A Stylish Shirt" or starring as a lead actor in "Power Bank" and "The Road Not Taken", later retitled "Crossroad" both of them were selected for the Bergen International Film Festival on the 2023 and 2024 editions respectively.

While in Norway, he was closely involved with the West Norwegian Film Centre and also produced a film podcast on Spotify with their sponsorship. He was also part of the Amalie Skram Revyen band, one of Bergen's most important events each year, playing the saxophone.

Since 2024 he has expanded himself into working on music videos, being the cinematographer on videos produced by La Cantera Crew and the assistant director for "EL PECAO" by activist and influencer Rubén Avilés.

== Personal life and ideology ==
He frequently visits educational institutions to share his expertise and promote youth involvement in the arts. He has emphasized in interviews that one of his main goals is “building a strong youth community”.

He has been in a relationship with Neveen Hisham since August 2023, making it public at the award ceremony at the 2nd Akida International Film Festival by September 2024.

== Filmography ==
Feature Films

Year	Title	Role
2026	Chichero	Co-producer

Documentaries

Year	Title	Notes
2027	The Impossible Fight	Docu-drama; Post-production

Short Film

Year	Title	Director	Writer	Producer	Notes
2020	Bored in X-Mas	Yes	Yes	No	
2021	The Sound of Silence	Yes	Yes	No	
2021	The Meaning	Yes	Yes	No	Also composer and uncredited editor
2022	Silence	Yes	Yes	No	
2022	The Magic Ring	Yes	Yes	Yes	
2022	The Red Secret	No	Yes	Yes	Also cinematographer, editor, assistant director and supervisor
2022	Postmouth: Banda Municipal de Tomares	Yes	No	No	Concert film for which he remained uncredited Also uncredited cinematographer and camera operator
2022	Being a Teenager is...	No	No	Yes	Also assistant director and uncredited cinematographer
2022	Destiny	Yes	Yes	Yes	Also executive producer, editor and casting director
2023	The Brute in the Mirror	Yes	Yes	Yes	Co-directed with Trygve Garatun; Also cinematographer
2023	Janu's Mask	Yes	No	Yes	Also uncredited editor and camera operator
2023	Untitled Nick Kremm Horror Short Film	Yes	No	No	Untitled short film released exclusively on his Instagram profile
2024	Timeless Tears of Passing Hours	Yes	Yes	No	Uncredited
2024	Crossroad	No	Story	No	

Acting roles

Year	Title	Role
2021	The Meaning	The Meaning
2022	The Reason Found by the Guilty Ones	Teen harasser
2023	Power Bank	Carlos
2024	Timeless Tears of Passing Hours	Him
2024	Crossroad	Archilleas

Commercials
He remains uncredited in all of these works

Year	Title	Director	Himself	Notes
2022	Sounds	Yes	Yes	Experimental promo for "Akida Corporation"
2022	Love is Love	Yes	No	Christmas romantic promos for "Akida Corporation"
2022	This Christmas, Be With Your Loved Ones	Yes	No	Christmas romantic promos for "Akida Corporation"
2023	Month of Morocco	Yes	Yes	Promotional short film for "Mes de Marruecos"
2023	Put colors into your life like you do at the cinema	Yes	No	Christmas promos for "Union Cine Ciudad"
2023	Enjoy at the cinema with your loved ones	Yes	No	Christmas promos for "Union Cine Ciudad"
2023	Because the cinema is for enjoying with your loved ones	Yes	No	Christmas promos for "Union Cine Ciudad"
2025	Con Arte - Un podcast oficialmente andaluz	No	Yes	Commercial for the podcast "Con Arte"

Webseries

Year	Title	Director	Producer	Self	Notes
2020	Palavomara's Thief	Yes	No	No	4 episodes
2021	Skai TV	Uncredited	No	Yes	News/reaction show; 3 episodes
2022	The Challenge Show	Uncredited	No	No	Short film anthology series Episode "#Theatraleon TV Edition Interview with Rocío Cuadrelli, Nick Kremm - BEING A TEENAGER IS..." where Rocio Cuadrelli introduces the short film. Co-director with Rocio Cuadrelli and also uncredited camera operator
2023	Learn Filmmaking	Uncredited	Yes	No	Podcast series Also camera operator and editor
2025	Con Arte	No	Yes	Yes	Talk show Also co-creator and interviewed on "Pilot - Nick Kremm" and stage manager on episode "Beatriz Arjona"
2025	Eventos Con Arte	No	Yes	Yes	Talk show spin-off of "Con Arte"

Other roles

Year	Title	Role	Notes
2022	It's Still Summer	Assistant camera	Short film
2022	Hughs that Hurt	Poster designer	Short film
2022	The Reason Found by the Guilty Ones	Poster designer and assistant camera	Independent feature-length film
2022	What Can I Loose?	Poster designer	Short film
2023	What Can I Help You?	Poster designer and photo editor	Medium-length film
2023	Unfinished Hospital Tale	Poster designer	Medium-length film
2024	Daniel Doncía - X Tonterías	Cinematographer	Music video
2024	Ruben Avilés - El Pecao	Assistant director	Music video
2024	Pablo Ardana - Nana de la Belleza	Cinematographer	Music video
2025	Castilleja, Town of Inmaculada Concepcion	Cinematographer	Documentary film
2026	Ahmar: Ashes Always Remain	Assistant director	Independent feature-length film

Unreleased films

Title	Role	Notes
A Stylish Shirt	Cinematographer	Completed but cancelled during post-production
Boredom	Director and producer	Completed but cancelled its festival circuit and YouTube premiere

== Discography ==
Singles

- Lost Without You (2024)

Instrumental

- Lost Without You (2024)
