= Seville International Short Film Festival =

Short film festival

The Seville International Short Film Festival (Spanish: Festival Internacional de Cortos de Sevilla) (previously known as the Akida International Film Festival) was held annually in Seville, Spain, from September 2023 until its third edition on 2025.

By the 2nd edition the festival had gained significant credibility and a reputation to grow as one of the most notorious film events in Seville, attracting over 3,000 submissions from 114 countries worldwide.

The festival was organized on its first edition by the Akida Corporation and since 2024 by International Creative Media Collective with La Cantera Crew as a collaborative organizer and collaborative sponsor as well. It counts with the support of numerous Spanish institutions, including Union Cine Ciudad, COCEMFE Sevilla, the Ayuntamiento de Sevilla, Sevilla City Office, Fundación Tres Culturas, and others.

== History ==
The Seville International Short Film Festival was first established as Akida international film festival in 2022 by young film director and actor Nick Kremm & Dimitris Pontikakis Batana and later, Tamás Rózsai joined.

The first edition took place in September 2023 at the Avenida 5 Cines, the oldest cinema at that time on Seville and it had a successful opening and run on its first edition.

By 2024, the festival had earned recognition from the Seville City Office, part of the Ayuntamiento de Sevilla, which described it as “solidifying its place as one of the most eagerly awaited film events of the year.”

In March 2025, the festival announced the change of name from Akida to the Seville International Short Film Festival. The third edition was held between 14 and 18 September 2025.

In April 2026, Kremm announced with a video the closing of the festival after three editions.

== Associations ==
=== COCEMFE Sevilla ===
Since its beginning the festival has been associated with COCEMFE Sevilla, an NGO in Seville dedicated to supporting individuals with physical and organic disabilities. Together, they have organized special film screenings focused on disability. In its second edition, the festival also held a significant conference at the Seville Office of Tourism and Culture, promoting the message of inclusion and culture through cinema.

=== Akida & Fundacion Tres Culturas ===
The festival has also collaborated since start with the Fundación Tres Culturas, an Andalusian foundation dedicated to promoting Arabic traditions and heritage. Together, they have been organizing special events and showcasing the work of emerging Arab filmmakers on events such as "Mes de Marruecos".

== Awards ==
- Best Drama Short Film
- Best Thriller Short Film
- Best Documentary Short Film
- Best Comedy Short Film (since 2024)
- Best Romance Short Film (since 2024)
- Best Sevillian Competition Short Film (since 2024)
- Best Young Filmmaker Short Film (since 2024)
- Best Short Film Made by Students (since 2024)
- Best Director
- Best Actor
- Best Actress
- Best Cinematography
- Best Screenplay (Entitled "Best Original Story" in 2023)
- Public Award

== Editions ==
- 1st Seville International Short Film Festival (Note: Held as the 1st Akida International Film Festival) (2023)
- 2nd Seville International Short Film Festival (Note: Held as the 2nd Akida International Film Festival) (2024)
