= My Masterpiece =

Argentine film

My Masterpiece (in Spanish, Mi Obra Maestra) is a 2018 Argentine film, directed by Gastón Duprat.

== Plot ==
The movie focuses on Arturo (Guillermo Francella), an art dealer with a gallery in Buenos Aires, and his relationship with the curmudgeonly and socially awkward painter Renzo (Luis Brandoni). Although highly renowned, Renzo struggles to sell new works as they are out of fashion and he stubbornly refuses to change his style. Eventually, his lack of income means that he is evicted from his apartment. Acting recklessly, he goes to a high-end restaurant and refuses to pay his bill. On leaving, he is hit by a truck and hospitalised.

Renzo appears to be recovering. However, a large group of industry figures gathers at a sombre ceremony, and sees a video in which Renzo starts by saying 'if you are watching this, I am already dead'.

Following Renzo's death, his artworks once more become highly sought after, and Arturo sells his remaining stock at inflated prices. It is revealed that Renzo is not really dead, but is living in a remote area and continuing to paint, and his only contact is with Arturo.

Arturo sells a number of paintings at ever-increasing prices. However, he and Renzo are eventually caught and, in a voiceover, Arturo reveals that they were sentenced to community service for fraud. The movie ends on Renzo's 80th birthday, when Arturo visits him with gifts of luxury food and wine products, as well as a painting that Renzo had admired.

== Release ==
The film premiered out-of-competition at the 2018 Venice Film Festival.

== Reception ==
My Masterpiece won the Audience Award at the 2018 Valladolid International Film Festival. On the review aggregator website Rotten Tomatoes, 75% of 8 critics' reviews are positive, with an average rating of 6.0/10.
