= 1st Seville International Short Film Festival =

2023 film award

- Opening film: There's Still Dust Under the Congo
- Closing film: I am Pablo
- Location: Seville, Spain
- Directors: Nick Kremm
- Hosted by: Rosario Batana; Isabel Robles
- Festival date: 2–9 September 2023

Seville International Short Film Festival
- 2nd

The 1st Seville International Short Film Festival (Note: Held as the 1st Akida International Film Festival) took place from 2 to September 9, 2023, at the Avenida 5 Cines located in Seville, Spain. It took place the premieres of the short film La Máscara de Janus (Janu's Mask) directed by the festival director Nick Kremm and the documentary feature film Yo soy Pablo (I am Pablo) directed by Fran Expósito as the closing film. The final award ceremony took place on September 9 with Mireya Bravo as the guest singer, performing her single ‘’Solo Respira’’ (Just Breathe).

== Juries ==
- Jesús Green, Spanish cinematographer
- Fran Expósito, Spanish director and actor
- Juan Carlos, Spanish novelist
- Pablo Casma, Spanish technician

== Selections ==
=== Official Selection ===
The selection include the next short films in competition:

English title	Original title	Director(s)	Production country(ies)
After the Fire	Depois de Fogo	Marco Carvalho	Brazil
Always Green	Siempreverdi	Tommaso Dicaeri	Italy
The Black Hen	La Poule Noire	Marion Clauzel	France
Breathing under a Cloth	Respirando Bajo la Tela	Karin Ortiz	Chile
Broken Wings		Carlos Albero	Spain
The Burden Upon Me	El peso sobre mí	Itxaso Díaz	Spain
Dajla: Cinema and Oblivion	Dajla: Cine y Olvido	Arturo Dueñas Herrero	Spain
Dancing with Rosa		Robert Muñoz Ruperez	Spain
Dativa		Daniel Calavera	Spain
Eden		Alfredo Campos	Spain
Elevator Pitch		Justin Bram	United States
The Farmhouse	La Masia	Víctor Català	Spain
Fearless	Sin Miedo	Cristina Rodriguez Cerro & Rocio Fernandez Nicolas	Spain, Austria
Habibi		Guillermo Cabot	Spain
If Tomorrow	Por si mañana	Agustin Claros	Spain
In the Shadow	Dans L'Ombre	Fabrice Mathieu	France
The Industry	La Industrial	Mario Mariño	Spain
Joselito		José Carlos Jiménez Revuelta & Marta Jiménez Revuelta	Spain
Kambana		Samuel Pastor	Spain
Kor		Köksal Içöz	Spain
Leading the Way	Abriendo Camino	Ferran Calbet Bigorra	Spain
Like Anyone Else	Como cualquier otro	Sergi González Fernández	Spain
Like Every Thursday	Como cada jueves	J.M. Asensio	Spain
Lost	A Corps Perdu	Kouroughli Sabrina & Vassart Gaetan	Spain
Luna		Daniel Caneiro	Spain
Meatballs	Albondigas	Julen Higuera Lozano	Spain
Memories of Blood	Memorias de Sangre	Manuel Verá López	Spain
Mission Euridice	Missione Euridice	Marco Spinelli	Italy
My Condition	Mi Condición	Coke Arijo	Spain
My First Choice	Mi Primera Opción	Carlota Callén	Spain
Nimeni		Yordana Romero	Spain
Pale Monster	Monstruo Palido	Juan Bolea	Spain
The Paradise	El Paraíso	Andrés Orozco Quintero	Spain
Re-animal		Rubén Gracerá Soto	Spain
Repeated Memories	반복되는 기억	Soo-min Park	South Korea
Ruffled Feathers		Alistair Checkoui	United Kingdom
Safe		Josema Roig	United States
Save Yourself	자신을 구하다	Youngsun Yoo	South Korea
Sea Light	Lúz de Mar	John Doe	Spain
Shades of Beirut	Sombras de Beirut	Maria Aizpuru	Spain
Solpor		Susana Alba	Spain
Spectrum Radio	Radio Espectro	Alejandro Bornes	Spain
Tell Everything	Díselo Todo	Óscar Villarroya	Spain
There	Allí	Simo Morcillo	Spain
There's Still Dust Under the Congo (opening film)	Aún queda polvo bajo el Congo	R. Ruvens	Spain
Toxic	Tóxico	Carlos Jiro	Spain
Under the Hands	Bajo las Manos	David Conill	Spain
Vincent		Alexis Néret	Spain
The White Monster		Jairo Iglesias	Spain
The World is Beautiful	العالم جميل	Himoud Faris	Kuwait

=== Out of Competition ===
The following titles had special premieres and were not in competition:

English title	Original title	Director(s)	Production country(ies)
I am Pablo (closing film)	Yo soy Pablo	Fran Expósito	Spain
Janu's Mask	La Máscara de Janus	Nick Kremm	Spain

== Awards ==
Winners are listed first, highlighted in boldface, and indicated with a double dagger (‡).

**Best Drama**: **The Black Hen – Marion Clauzel ‡**; Habibi - Guillermo Cabot; Kor - Köksal Içöz; Like Anyone Else - Sergi González	**Best Thriller**: **Broken Wings – Carlos Albero ‡**; The Farmhouse - Victor Català; Luna - Daniel M. Caneiro; The White Monster - Jairo Iglesias
**Best Documentary**: **Mission Euridice – Marco Spinelli ‡**; Dajla: Cinema and Oblivion - Arturo Dueñas Herrero; Kambana - Samuel Pastor; Shades of Beirut - María Aizpuru	**Best Director**: **Jairo Iglesias –The White Monster ‡**; Coke Arijo -My Condition; Daniel Calavera -Dativa; Manuel Verá López -Memories of Blood
**Best Actor**: **Javier Collado Jímenez –Like Anyone Else ‡**	**Best Actress**: **Karina Kolokolchykova –Broken Wings ‡**
**Public Award**: **Nimeni – Yordana Romero ‡**	**Best Cinematography**: **Dativa – Manuel Buil ‡**
**Best Original Story**: **Broken Wings – Carlos Albero ‡**; Dativa - Daniel Calavera; Kor - Köksal Içöz; The White Monster - Martiño Vázquez

=== Shorts films with multiple wins & nominations ===
Films with multiple nominations
Nominations	Film
3	The White Monster
2	Broken Wings
2	Dativa
2	Kor

Films with multiple wins
Wins	Film
3	Broken Wings
