= Nada (TV series) =

Argentine TV series

- Genre: Dark comedy
- Created by: Mariano Cohn & Gastón Duprat
- Written by: Emanuel Díez; Mariano Cohn; Gastón Duprat
- Directed by: Mariano Cohn & Gastón Duprat
- Starring: Luis Brandoni; Robert De Niro; Majo Cabrera; Silvia Kutika; Enrique Piñeyro; Gastón Cocchiarale; Daniel Miglioranza; Belén Chavanne
- Composers: Alejandro Kauderer; Ignacio Gabriel
- Country of origin: Argentina
- Original language: Spanish
- No. of seasons: 1
- No. of episodes: 5

Production
- Executive producers: Leonardo Aranguibel; Fernando Barbosa; Mariana Pérez
- Producers: Mariano Cohn & Gastón Duprat
- Production location: Buenos Aires
- Cinematography: Alejo Maglio
- Editors: Jimena García Molt; Sebastián Mega Díaz
- Running time: 28–25 min
- Production company: Metrovisión Producciones

Original release
- Network: Star+
- Release: 11 October 2023

Nada (Spanish for Nothing) is an Argentine dark comedy television series created by Gastón Duprat & Mariano Cohn, starring Luis Brandoni and Robert De Niro. It was distributed Star+ in Latin America and by Disney+ in United States and Europe.

The series follows the life of wealthy food critic Manuel Tamayo Prats (Brandoni) who is going through a personal crisis after the death of his housekeeper. Set in Buenos Aires, the series is narrated by Manuel's old friend, Vicent Parisi (De Niro), who eventually travels to the city to help his old friend. It was released on 11 October 2023.

On Rotten Tomatoes, the miniseries has a Fresh rating of 83%, based on 6 critics reviews.
