= Oscar Martínez (actor) =

Argentine actor, author, & theatre director (born 1949)

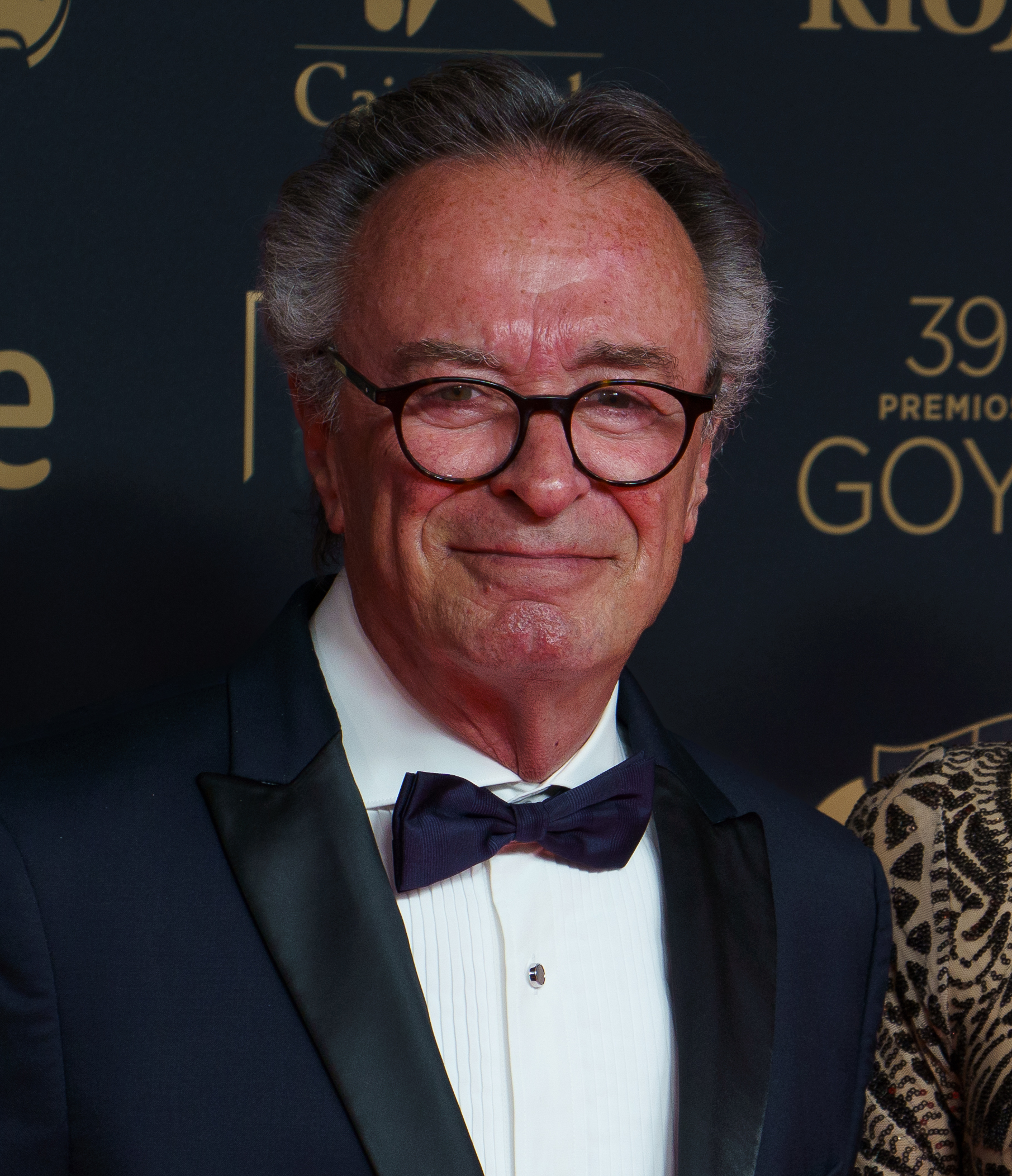
- Martínez in 2025
- Born: October 23, 1949 (age 76); Buenos Aires, Argentina
- Occupations: Actor, author and theatre director
- Years active: 1969–present
- Spouse(s): Cristina Lastra (1970–1987); Mercedes Morán (1987–2000); Marina Borensztein (2011–present)
- Children: Virginia Martínez Lastra; Victoria Martínez Lastra; Ana Martínez Lastra; Manuela Martínez Morán

Oscar Martínez (born October 23, 1949) is an Argentine actor, author and theatre director who works both in his country and in Spain, where he is based. He received the Premio Konex de Platino in 1991 for his film work, and again in 2001 for his work as the theatre actor. He also received the Volpi Cup for Best Actor at the 73rd Venice Film Festival for his role in the comedy-drama The Distinguished Citizen.

== Filmography ==
=== Television ===
Year	Title	Character	Channel
1969-1971	Cosa juzgada		Canal 11
1974	Alta comedia		Canal 9
1975	Tu rebelde ternura	Diego Osorio	Canal 13
1980	El coraje de querer	Roberto Ledezma	Canal 9
1980	Un día 32 en San Telmo	Agustín	Canal 9
1981	Tengo calle	Piolita	Canal 9
1982	Los siete pecados capitales		TV Pública
1985	Entre el cielo y la tierra		TV Pública
1986	Situación límite	School principal	TV Pública
1987	Ficciones		TV Pública
1991	Atreverse		Telefe
1992-1993	Luces y sombras		TV Pública
1994-1995	Nueve lunas	Pedro Laurenti	Canal 13
1996	De poeta y de loco	Santiago Monti	Canal 13
1999	El hombre	José Francisco Maciel	Canal 13
2000	El comisario		Telecinco
2000	Tiempo final	Sergio	Telefe
2001	Ilusiones	Félix Figueroa	Canal 13
2011	El Puntero	El Dogo Caruso	Canal 13
2012	Condicionados	Dicky Cocker	Canal 13
2014-2015	Noche y día	Guillermo Inchausti	Canal 13

=== Theater ===
Year	Title	Character
1970	El avión negro	
1971	Cremona	
1976	Largo viaje hacia la noche	
1977	Casas de vi udos	Harry
1977	Casamiento entre vivos y muertos	
1977-1978	Mustafá	
1978-1979	El zoo de cristal	Tom
1981	El jardín de los cerezos	
1981	Encantada de conocerlo	
1982	Griselda Gambaro	
1983	Amadeus	Wolfgang Amadeus Mozart
1985	Yo me bajo en la próxima... ¿Y usted?	
1986-1988	El último de los amantes ardientes	
1988-1990	El protagonista	
1991-1992	Jacobo Langsner	
1993	Relaciones peligrosas	
1995	La noche de la iguana	
1998-2000	ART	
2001	Variaciones Enigma	
2002-2004	ART	
2005-2007	Ella en mi cabeza	
2006-2007	Días contados	
2008	Dos menos	
2009	Pura ficción	
2010-2011	Arthur Miller	
2012	Todos felices	
2013	Amadeus	Antonio Salieri

=== Movies ===
Year	Movie	Character	Director
1971	La gran ruta		Fernando Ayala
1972	El profesor tirabombas		Fernando Ayala
1974	La tregua	Jaime Santomé	Sergio Renán
1984	La Rosales	Enzo	David Lipszyc
1984	Asesinato en el Senado de la Nación	Federico Pinedo	Juan José Jusid
1985	Contar hasta diez	Ramón Vallejos	Oscar Barney Finn
1985	La cruz invertida	Father Carlos Samuel Torres	Mario David
1986	Soy paciente		Rodolfo Corral
1986	Expreso a la emboscada	Figueras	Gilles Béhat
1987	Los dueños del silencio	Lieutenant Rodríguez	Carlos Lemos
1988	Tango, Bayle nuestro	Voice-over	Jorge Zanada
1992	¿Dónde estás amor de mi vida que no te puedo encontrar?	Fernández	Juan José Jusid
1995	No te mueras sin decirme adónde vas	Oscar	Eliseo Subiela
1998	Cómplices	Julio Romero	Néstor Montalbano
2001	Berlin Is in Germany	Enrique Cortés	Hannes Stöhr
2008	El nido vacío	Leonardo Vindel	Daniel Burman
2014	Wild Tales	Mauricio	Damián Szifron
2015	La patota	Fernando	Santiago Mitre
2015	El espejo de los otros		Marcos Carnevale
2016	Kóblic	Commissar Velarde	Sebastián Borensztein
2016	Inseparables	Felipe	Marcos Carnevale
2016	The Distinguished Citizen	Daniel Mantovani	Mariano Cohn and Gastón Duprat
2017	Toc Toc	Federico	Vicente Villanueva
2018	Las grietas de Jara	Nelson Jara	Nicolás Gil Lavedra
2019	La misma sangre	Elías	Miguel Cohan
2019	Yo, mi mujer y mi mujer muerta	Bernardo	Santi Amodeo
2019	El cuento de las comadrejas	Norberto Imbert	Juan José Campanella
2019	I Miss You	Jorge	Rodrigo Bellott
2019	Live Twice, Love Once	Emilio	María Ripoll
2021	Official Competition	Iván Torres	Gastón Duprat & Mariano Cohn
