= Locked (film) =

2025 film by David Yarovesky

- Theatrical release poster
- Directed by: David Yarovesky
- Written by: Nati Ben Orev
- Screenplay by: Michael Arlen Ross
- Based on: 4x4 by: Mariano Cohn; Gastón Duprat
- Produced by: Ara Keshishian; Petr Jákl; Sam Raimi; Zainab Azizi; Sean O'Reilly
- Starring: Bill Skarsgård; Anthony Hopkins
- Cinematography: Michael Dallatorre
- Edited by: Andrew Buckland; Peter Gvozdas
- Music by: Timothy Williams
- Production companies: ZQ Entertainment; R.U. Robot Studios; Arcana Studio; Raimi Productions; Sillen Productions
- Distributed by: The Avenue
- Release date: March 21, 2025 (United States)
- Running time: 96 minutes
- Country: United States
- Language: English
- Budget: $5 million
- Box office: $4.7 million

Locked is a 2025 American psychological thriller film directed by David Yarovesky and written by Michael Arlen Ross. It is a remake of the Argentine film 4x4 (2019).

The plot follows Eddie (Bill Skarsgård), a petty thief and deadbeat dad who breaks into a state-of-the-art SUV, only to be trapped inside and played with by the sadistic owner William (Anthony Hopkins).

Locked was released in the United States on March 21, 2025, by The Avenue. The film received mixed reviews from critics and grossed $4.1 million worldwide.

== Plot ==
Jobless former criminal Eddie Barrish struggles to provide for his daughter, Sarah. One day, while searching for unattended cars to rob, he comes across an unlocked Dolus luxury SUV. As he gets in to loot the valuables, the vehicle locks itself, trapping him inside. Eddie's struggles to break his way out were futile, and he cuts his arm in the process.

Exhausted and out of options, he accepts an incoming call on the car's screen, which he previously ignored. The caller is William, the car's owner, who watches Eddie through the car's interior cameras. William explains that, after six previous break-ins, he had the Dolus customized into an elaborate trap, and demonstrates by shocking Eddie with tasers built into the seats.

Eddie shoots at the bulletproof glass with his gun, but the bullet ricochets into his leg. The car is too darkly tinted and soundproofed for passersby to notice him. William continues talking, revealing he is a wealthy doctor. Eddie passes out and awakens a few hours later to find his injuries treated.

The following day, William talks about his own daughter Emma, and torments Eddie with shocks, freezing air conditioning, and yodeling music. By nightfall Eddie apologizes for cursing, and William relents calling from the balcony of his nearby condo. With terminal cancer, William has taken it upon himself to deliver his own justice. He offers to let Eddie go if he can prove that breaking into the Dolus is his first offense, then subjects him to punishing heat.

Starving and dehydrated, Eddie surrenders his personal information. William turns off the heat and directs him to a bottle of water. Scratching off his last lottery ticket, Eddie discovers he has won the money he needs. He apologizes sincerely, and William rewards him with a cookie hidden in the glovebox. Eddie realizes he can access the car's electrical system below the glovebox, which the cameras cannot see, and begins probing for loose circuits with his foot.

The following day a delirious Eddie resorts to drinking his own urine. That night he thinks he's managed to start the car, but William reveals he is piloting the Dolus remotely, sending Eddie careening through the city. Interrupting a pair of muggers, William ignores Eddie's pleas and crushes them to death with the SUV. The high speed joyride ends when an abrupt stop knocks Eddie unconscious.

Awakening the next day, Eddie learns that William used his information to track down Sarah. Helpless, he watches William attempt to run her over on her way home from school. Threatening to shoot himself and end William's game, Eddie pulls the trigger only to discover the gun is unloaded. Sarah is spared, but Eddie smashes the car's cameras and dashboard display, sending his daughter a farewell message.

William arrives to complete Eddie's punishment, forces him to cuff himself, and reloads the gun. Allowing Eddie to smoke a final joint, William drives them out of the city to kill him and dispose of his body. He reveals that Emma was killed during a robbery, fueling his plan. Eddie succeeds in disconnecting the car's power. As the SUV tumbles off the road, the gun goes off and William is shot.

Eddie frees himself and attacks William just as a call from Sarah comes through. Promising to pick her up, Eddie begs William to unlock the car which is now catching fire but William dies before he can comply. Breaking through the smashed rear windshield, Eddie is rescued by a passing driver. He returns to the auto shop with his lottery winnings, but when the van still won't be repaired in time, he buys a bike for Sarah and rides it to school, reuniting with his daughter.

== Cast ==
- Bill Skarsgård as Eddie Barrish
- Anthony Hopkins as William
- Michael Eklund as Karl
- Ashley Cartwright as Sarah
- Navid Charkhi as Butter

== Production ==
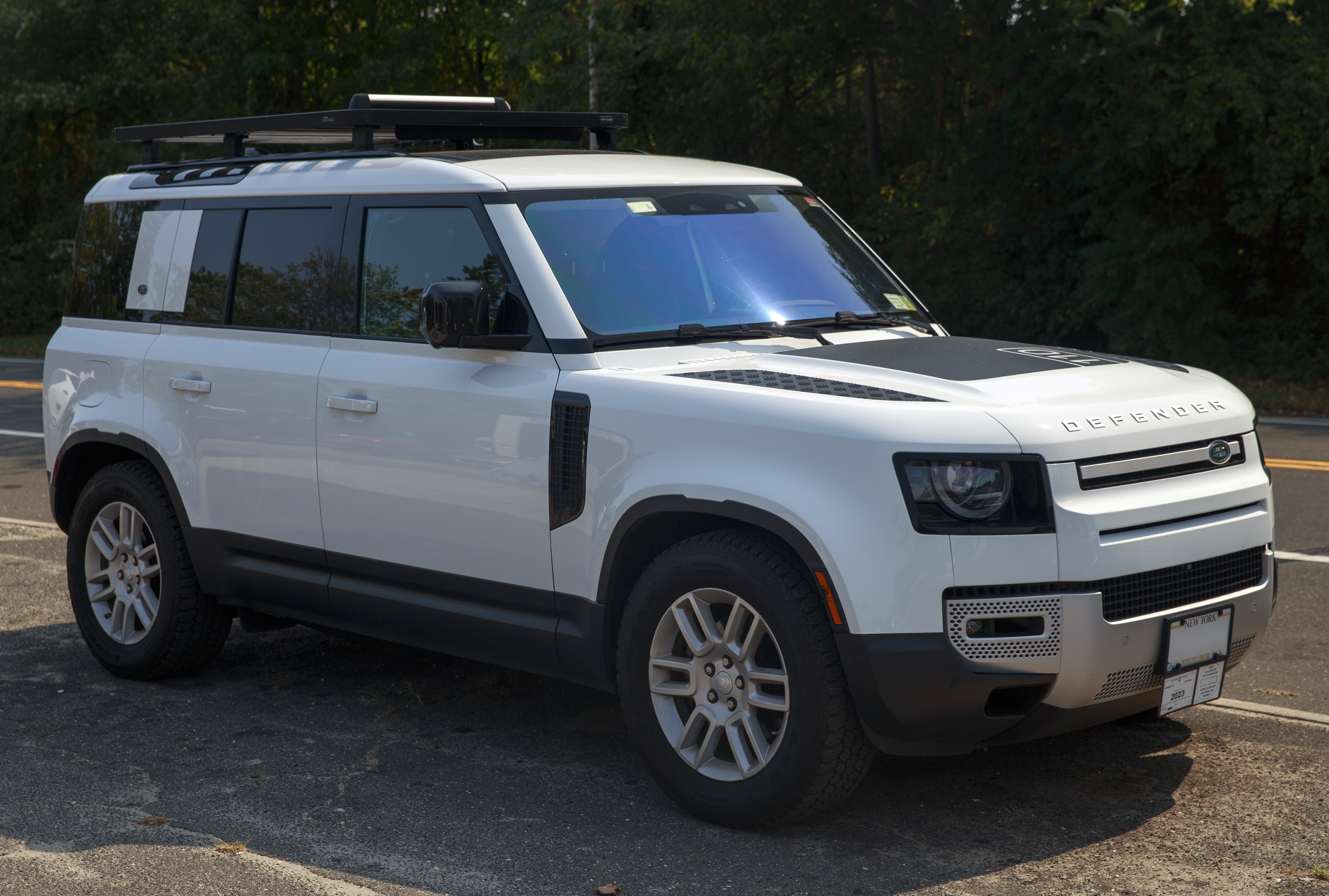
A 2020 Land Rover Defender was used as the SUV, known as a "Dolus", in the film.

The film is a remake of Argentine thriller 4x4 (2019) by Mariano Cohn and Gastón Duprat, alongside the other remakes. It was produced under Ara Keshishian and Petr Jákl's ZQ Entertainment, with Sam Raimi and Zainab Azizi's Raimi Productions and Sean O'Reilly's Arcana Studio. David Yarovesky was set as director with Michael Arlen Ross as screenplay writer. Set in main role was Glen Powell, but he left the project due to scheduling issues, ultimately being replaced by Bill Skarsgård. Still in, Anthony Hopkins stayed as the main antagonist, with Ashley Cartwright, Michael Eklund, and Navid Charkhi joining the cast.

Principal photography took place in Vancouver between November and December 2023. Lionsgate Films and Paramount Pictures helped The Avenue to promote the film, uploading the trailer on their websites.

== Release ==
Locked had a limited-release to accredited buyers on September 6, 2024 at the Toronto International Film Festival.

The film rights were then bought by The Avenue and was released theatrically on March 21, 2025.

== Reception ==
=== Box office ===
As of July 24, 2025, Locked has grossed $1.6 million in the United States and Canada, and $2.5 million in other territories, for a worldwide total of $4.1 million.

=== Critical response ===
On the review aggregator website Rotten Tomatoes, 63% of 81 critics' reviews are positive, with an average rating of 5.9/10. The website's consensus reads: "Matching up Bill Skarsgård and Anthony Hopkins in a battle of wits, Locked is loaded with plenty of clever jolts even if it doesn't quite know where to park its story." Metacritic, which uses a weighted average, assigned the film a score of 45 out of 100, based on 10 critics, indicating "mixed or average" reviews.
