= 4x4 (2019 film) =

2019 film by Mariano Cohn

- Theatrical release poster
- Directed by: Mariano Cohn
- Screenplay by: Mariano Cohn; Gastón Duprat
- Produced by: Gastón Duprat
- Starring: Peter Lanzani; Dady Brieva; Luis Brandoni
- Cinematography: Kiko de la Rica, AEC
- Edited by: David Gallart; Elena Ruiz
- Music by: Dante Spinetta
- Production companies: Televisión Abierta; Mediapro
- Distributed by: Buena Vista International
- Release date: 4 April 2019 (Argentina)
- Running time: 90 minutes
- Countries: Argentina; Spain
- Language: Spanish
- Budget: €3 million
- Box office: $1,292,773

4x4 is a 2019 crime thriller action film directed by Mariano Cohn, who co-wrote it with Gastón Duprat. Its premise is similar to that of the 1998 film Captured.

The film stars Peter Lanzani as Ciro, a criminal who breaks into a 4x4 SUV, owned by an obstetrician medic Enrique Ferrari (Dady Brieva), in order to steal the car stereo. The car has a security mechanism that cuts the power, trapping Ciro in the process.

== Plot ==
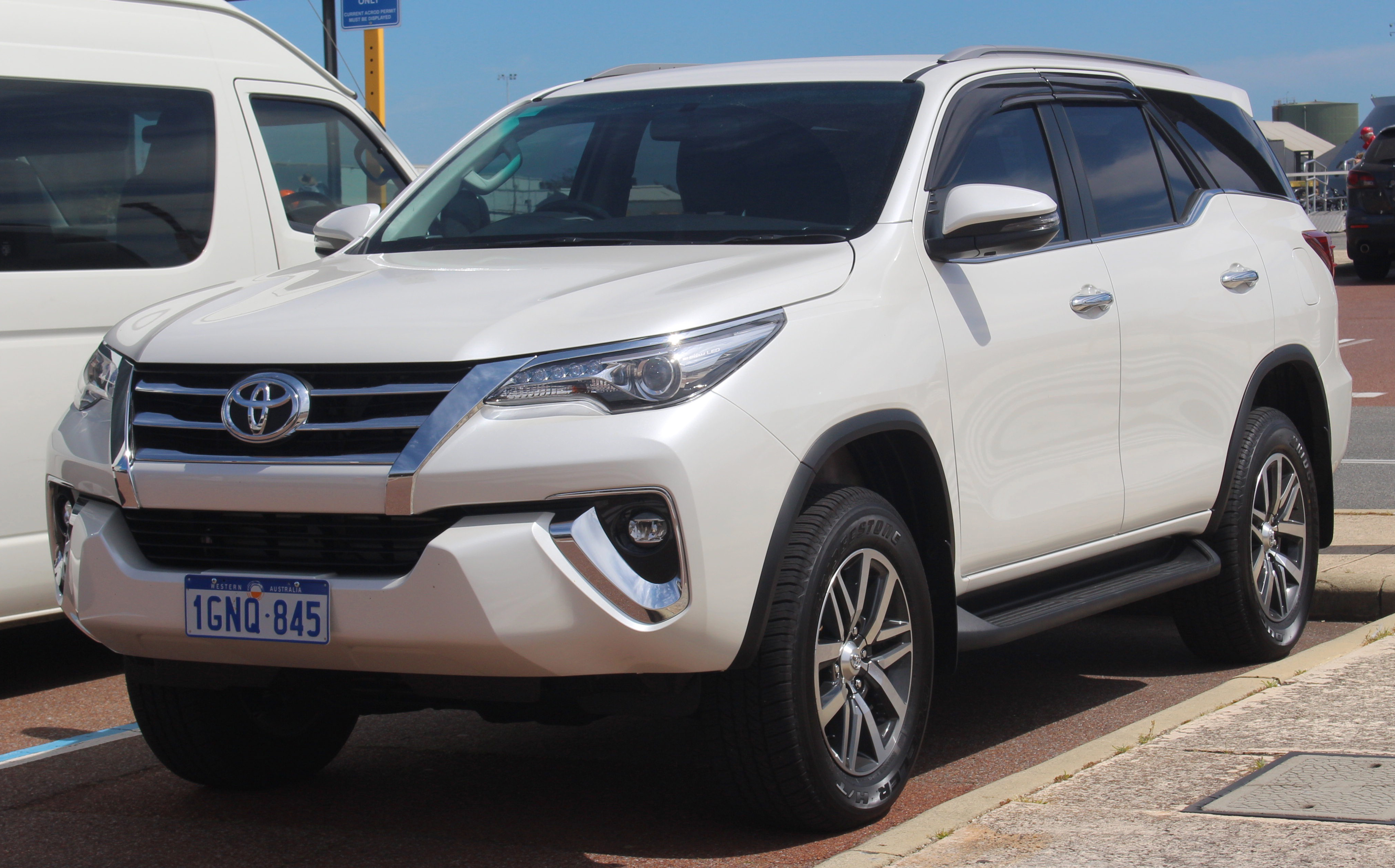
The car where the film takes place is a Toyota Fortuner.

Ciro is walking in a neighborhood in Buenos Aires when he sees an SUV model car that catches his interest. He breaks into it, and begins taking anything including the stereo. When he tries to get out, however, he cannot open the doors. He frantically tries to get out, ripping the door panels off but cuts his arm when reaching for the lock mechanism. When he tries to shoot at the front windshield, the bullet bounces off and the ricochet hits him in the thigh. He tries calling for help but his cellphone dies.

Ciro uses his shirt as a tourniquet to stop the bleeding. Ciro soon finishes his last Pepsi bottle due to the heat, and notices a woman nearby fixing her makeup, who doesn’t hear Ciro’s screams for help. A number calls the car with the caller ID of ‘ME’, belonging to Enrique, the owner of the car. Enrique reveals that he built a security system, the 4x4, that has cut the car’s power the moment Ciro broke in. The car is bulletproof and soundproofed, and a gas tank inside is rigged with an explosive.

Enrique explains that he is a widower suffering from terminal cancer with only a few months left to live. Ciro doesn’t care about Enrique’s life story and threatens to kill Enrique and his family if he doesn't get set free. Enrique hangs up and turns on the A/C to its strongest level, freezing Ciro to the point that his lips turn blue from near hypothermia. As Ciro becomes desperate, he finds hope when a thief tries to break into the car, but his hopes are broken when a series of by-passers team up to catch the thief, assault him, and call the police.

Enrique calls again to talk more about himself and turns off the A/C. Weak and delirious, Ciro eventually expresses that the world is run by the rich, which is why he won't obey their rules. He reveals that he steals like his father and grandfather before him and won't obey the rules even if a gun was pointed at his head. Ciro’s skin later turns yellow from dehydration, and Enrique informs him of a washer hose with water to drink in the back. As time passes, Enrique rewards Ciro for his compliance by revealing that a chocolate bar is hidden in the brake panel.

Days later, Enrique calls and reveals that he has visited Ciro’s home seeing his wife Irina and his son Lionel. Enrique has told Ciro’s family that he has won $100,000, and gives the money to Irina to help move out of their apartment and buy a house. Ciro is in tears that Enrique had gone to his family asking what he did to Enrique to deserve his predicament. Enrique starts teasing Ciro that he has Ciro’s criminal record, and recounts his various crimes. Ciro denies responsibility for his actions. Enrique says Ciro doesn't deserve his family for his crimes and hangs up. Having charged up his phone in the sunlight, Ciro apologizes to his family for messing up again before the phone dies.

At night, the car finally starts up. Ciro rushes to a gas station and eats a hamburger. When the cashier alerts the security guard that Ciro hasn't paid for his food Ciro shoots him dead for disturbing his meal. Ciro awakes realizing it was all a dream and soon he sees Enrique standing in front of him having made one last call. Enrique tries to take Ciro away to punish him more but Ciro manages to escape – only to be subdued once more in his weakened state and held hostage. Julio Amadeo, a retired negotiator, talks to Enrique. Enrique argues that no one cares for people like him or the neighborhood when things go bad, garnering support of half the community.

With half the neighborhood siding for Enrique to kill Ciro and the other to let Ciro free, Julio finally convinces Enrique to surrender and release Ciro. Enrique gets into his car and detonates the explosive device, killing himself and possible bystanders in the crossfire. Ciro is arrested for his crime, and the local news dubs him the ‘Samurai Doctor’ for his strong convictions in seeing himself in the right. Ciro awaits trial for the events that transpired.

== Cast ==
- Peter Lanzani as Ciro Bermúdez, a low class thug that breaks in into a 4x4 truck
- Dady Brieva as Dr. Enrique Ferrari, a high-class terminally ill obstetrician who was the victim of several criminal acts and owner of the vehicle Ciro breaks into
- Luis Brandoni as Julio Amadeo, a retired police mediator who intervenes during the situation
- Noelia Castaño as Officer L. Tapia, a female bicycle patrol
- Alejandro Paker as police chief
- Gustavo Rodriguez as police officer

== Production ==
Roberto Desumvila's experience with a thief he trapped in his car was one of the inspirations for the film.

The development of the film began when director Mariano Cohn was watching TV and found a news about a thief that got trapped in a car he tried to steal in Brazil, and later in Córdoba, Argentina to Roberto Desumvila. Producer Gastón Duprat and Cohn looked forward to spark debate about insecurity and its victims and criminals. As per usual in their filmography, Duprat and Cohn read the script with people they knew were alien to the film industry for output.

The film was shot in 22 days in a single set at Estudios Baires. While both Luis Brandoni and Peter Lanzani agreed with the vision the director had, Dady Brieva thought more of the film as the depiction of the alienation both seniors and the lower class citizens suffer in the system and society. The film features a self-reference in the background, in the form of a film poster for a hypothetical The Man Next Door 2: The Neighbour is Back. It was meant to be a simple joke, but when Cohn called Daniel Aráoz to tell him about it, Aráoz asked why not doing it for real and so the screenwriting for the sequel began. Peter Lanzani used Colin Farrell and Ryan Reynolds' performances in Phone Booth and Buried as acting reference. In the film, Ciro wears a pink Boca Juniors jersey. Cohn chose this particular jersey for several reasons: to create color contrast with the car's upholstery; because it is Boca's most controversial jersey; and to spark controversy. The film was dedicated to Alejandro Cohn, Mariano's brother who died in 2015.

== Release ==
The movie premiered on 4 April 2019 on 285 screens under distribution of Buena Vista International. The film did not get a theatrical release on Spain, and it was released on Orange TV instead.

== Reception ==
=== Box office ===
4x4 sold 10,605 tickets on its opening day in Argentina, ranking fourth. During its opening weekend 4x4 ranked 4th at the Argentine box office, selling 83,242 tickets, the best opening weekend for an Argentine film in the year. On its second weekend ranked 3rd, selling 56,909 tickets. On its third weekend ranked 5th, selling 50,932 tickets. On its fourth weekend ranked 4th, selling 21,535 tickets. On its fifth weekend ranked 6th, selling 12,290 tickets. On its sixth weekend ranked 10th, selling 5,327 tickets.

=== Critical response ===
On Argentine review aggregator Todas Las Críticas, 46 of the 63 reviews of 4x4 are positive, with an average rating of 58/100.

== Remakes ==
The film has been remade thrice: a Brazilian remake titled A Jaula was released in 2022, an Indian Telugu language remake titled Dongalunnaru Jaagratha was released in the same year, and an American remake Locked was released in 2025.
