= The Little Switzerland =

2019 Spanish comedy film

- Theatrical release poster
- Spanish: La pequeña Suiza
- Directed by: Kepa Sojo
- Written by: Alberto López; Daniel Monedero; Jelen Morales; Sonia Pacios; Kepa Sojo
- Produced by: Ricardo Marco Budé; José Luis Jiménez; Kiko Martínez; Ignacio Salazar-Simpson; Katixa Silva; Leonel Vieira
- Starring: Jon Plazaola; Maggie Civantos; Ingrid García-Jonsson; Secun de la Rosa; Maribel Salas; Karra Elejalde; Antonio Resines
- Cinematography: Kenneth Oribe
- Production companies: Nadie es perfecto; Kuttuna Filmak; Stopline Films
- Distributed by: eOne Films
- Release date: 26 April 2019 (Spain)
- Running time: 86 minutes
- Country: Spain
- Language: Spanish

The Little Switzerland (Spanish: La pequeña Suiza) is a 2019 Spanish comedy film directed by Kepa Sojo and starring Maggie Civantos, Jon Plazaola, Ingrid García-Jonsson and Secun de la Rosa. The plot draws inspiration from the Treviño enclave dispute, and comedy films such as Passport to Pimlico (1949), and Welcome Mr. Marshall! (1953).

== Plot ==
The plot concerns about a town in Castile and León with a majority of citizens leaning towards joining the Basque Country. Those attempts are frustrated by the opposition of the Junta of Castile and León and the passivity of the Basque Government. An archeology student then finds a crypt with the purported remains of William Tell's son Walter and the population ensuingly proceed to embrace a Swiss identity.

== Cast ==
- Pêpê Rapazote as Fernando
- Maggie Civantos as Yolanda
- Ingrid García Jonsson as Nathalie
- Antonio Resines as Pascual
- Karra Elejalde as Peio
- Anabela Teixeira as Heidi
- Kandido Uranga as Añíbarro
- Ramón Barea as Antolín
- Secun de la Rosa as Don Anselmo
- Enrique Villén as Revuelta
- Jon Plazaola as Gorka
- Mikel Losada as Bernabé
- Maribel Salas as Anamari
- Lander Otaola as Iker
- Susana Soleto as Reportera
- Isabel Guardiola as Secretaria suiza
- Iñigo Salinero

== Production ==
A Spanish production, the film was produced by Nadie es perfecto alongside Kuttuna Filmak and Stopline Films, with the participation of RTVE. Shooting locations in Álava included Arceniega, Ayala, Llodio, and Vitoria.

== Release ==
Distributed by eOne Films, the film was released theatrically in Spain on 26 April 2019.

== Reception ==
According to Jordi Battle Caminal, reviewing for Fotogramas, the best of the film are the supporting characters.

== See also ==
- List of Spanish films of 2019
