= Yesterday's Guys Used No Arsenic =

1976 film

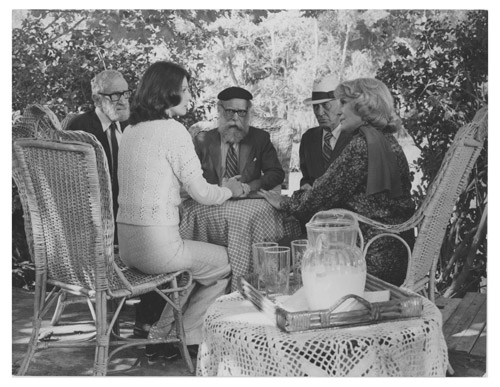
- Still with Bárbara Mujíca, Mario Soffici, Narciso Ibáñez Menta, Arturo García Buhr, and Mecha Ortíz
- Directed by: José A. Martínez Suárez
- Written by: José A. Martínez Suárez; Augusto Giustozzi
- Produced by: Héctor Báilez
- Starring: Mecha Ortiz
- Cinematography: Miguel Rodríguez
- Release date: 22 April 1976
- Running time: 110 minutes
- Country: Argentina
- Language: Spanish

Yesterday's Guys Used No Arsenic (Spanish: Los Muchachos de antes no usaban arsénico) is a 1976 Argentine black comedy crime film directed by José A. Martínez Suárez. The film was selected as the Argentine entry for the Best Foreign Language Film at the 49th Academy Awards, but was not accepted as a nominee.

== Cast ==
- Mecha Ortiz as Mara Ordaz
- Arturo García Buhr as Pedro
- Narciso Ibáñez Menta as Norberto
- Mario Soffici as Martín
- Bárbara Mujica as Laura

== See also ==
- The Weasel's Tale, a 2019 remake
- List of submissions to the 49th Academy Awards for Best Foreign Language Film
- List of Argentine submissions for the Academy Award for Best Foreign Language Film
