= Daniel Aráoz (actor) =

Argentine actor

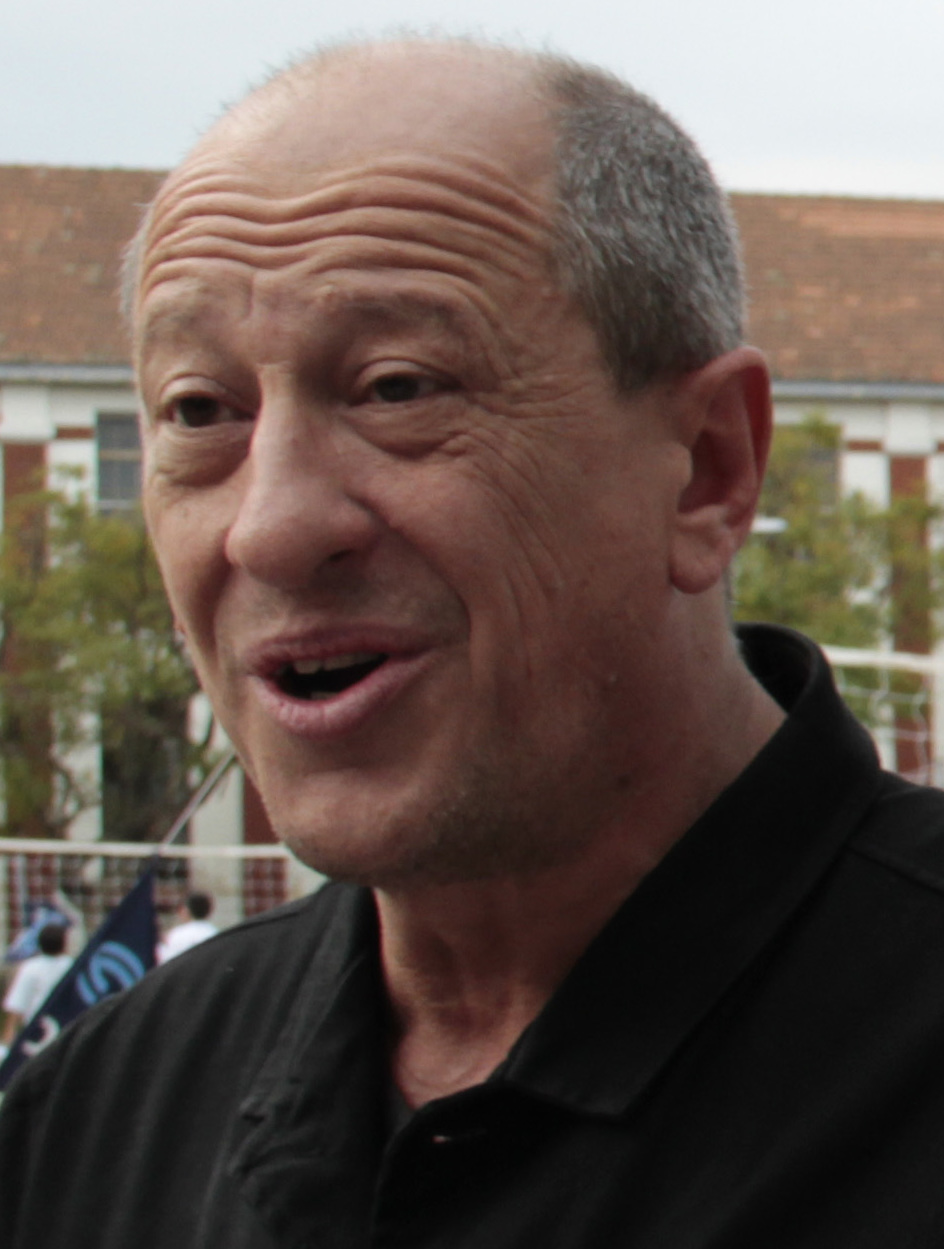
- Aráoz in 2012
- Born: 6 September 1962 (age 63); Córdoba, Argentina
- Occupation: Actor
- Years active: 1985-present

Daniel Aráoz (born 6 September 1962) is an Argentine actor. He appeared in more than thirty films since 1985.

== Selected filmography ==
Year	Title	Role	Notes
2009	The Man Next Door		
2017	A Sort of Family		
2018	Porn for Newbies	Boris	
2019	Heroic Losers		

== Awards ==
- Silver Condor Award for Best Actor (2011)
