= The Weasel's Tale =

- Theatrical release poster
- Spanish: El cuento de las comadrejas
- Directed by: Juan José Campanella
- Screenplay by: Juan José Campanella; Darren Kloomok
- Based on: Yesterday's Guys Used No Arsenic by José Martínez Suárez & Augusto Giustozzi
- Produced by: Axel Kuschevatzky; Muriel Cabeza; Pierluigi Gazzolo; Gerardo Herrero; Mariela Besuievski; Juan José Campanella
- Starring: Graciela Borges; Oscar Martínez; Luis Brandoni; Marcos Mundstock; Clara Lago; Nicolás Francella
- Edited by: Juan José Campanella
- Production companies: 100 Bares; Telefe / Viacom International Studios; Tornasol; Jempsa; Canarias Cinema 01 AIE
- Distributed by: BF Paris (ar); Syldavia Cinema (es)
- Release dates: 16 May 2019 (Argentina); 12 July 2019 (Spain)
- Countries: Argentina; Spain
- Language: Spanish

The Weasel's Tale (Spanish: El cuento de las comadrejas) is a 2019 Argentine-Spanish black comedy film directed by Juan José Campanella starring Graciela Borges, Oscar Martínez, Luis Brandoni and Marcos Mundstock alongside Clara Lago and Nicolás Francella. It is a remake of 1976 film Los muchachos de antes no usaban arsénico.

== Plot ==
The plot follows four aged people living in an old mansion (Mara, Pedro and Martín and Norberto), all of them professionally related to the showbiz (respectively lead actress, bit-part actor, screenwriter and director) and how they deal with the arrival of the young Bárbara and Francisco, who are real estate developers wanting to purchase the plot.

== Cast ==
- Graciela Borges as Mara Ordaz
- Oscar Martínez as Norberto Imbert
- Luis Brandoni as Pedro de Córdova
- Marcos Mundstock as Martín Saravia
- Clara Lago as Bárbara Otamendi
- Nicolás Francella as Francisco Gourmand

== Production ==
The screenplay was penned by Juan José Campanella and Darren Kloomok, remaking the 1976 black comedy Yesterday's Guys Used No Arsenic, directed by José Martínez Suárez and written by Martínez Suárez alongside Augusto Giustozzi. A co-production among Argentine and Spanish companies, it was produced by 100 Bares, Telefe & Viacom, Jempsa S.A., Tornasol and Canarias cinema 01, and it had the participation of RTVE and Movistar+.

== Release ==
Distributed by BF Paris, the film was theatrically released in Argentina on 16 May 2019. Distributed by Syldavia Cinema, it was theatrically released in Spain on 12 July 2019.

== Reception ==
On Rotten Tomatoes, the film has an aggregated score of 92% based on 22 positive and 2 negative critic reviews.

Adrian Melo of Página|12 considered that the film "misses the homoerotic provocation and sexual ambiguity of the original version" offering instead "a fable with too many morals and a whiff of social darwinism".

Beatriz Martínez of El Periódico de Catalunya rated the film 3 out of 5 stars, writing that Campanella directs "a twisted, bizarre and macabre story where he reflects human miseries".

Andrea G. Bermejo of Cinemanía also gave the film 3 out of 5 stars, underscoring it to be "a black comedy that shines much more in the script than in the direction", also considering that even if predictable, the ending is "no less enjoyable".

Jonathan Holland of The Hollywood Reporter presented the film as a "slickly calibrated, classically structured dark comedy" summing up as a bottom-line "old-fashioned fare with an up-to-date edge".

== Accolades ==
| Year | Award | Category | Nominee(s) | Result | Ref. |
|---|---|---|---|---|---|
| 2020 | 7th Platino Awards | Best Director | Juan José Campanella | Nominated | |
| 2020 | 7th Platino Awards | Best Actress | Graciela Borges | Nominated | |
| 2020 | 7th Platino Awards | Best Original Score | Emilio Kauderer | Nominated | |
| 2020 | 7th Platino Awards | Best Sound | José Luis Díaz | Nominated | |
| 2020 | 14th Sur Awards | Best Film | | Nominated | |
| 2020 | 14th Sur Awards | Best Director | Juan José Campanella | Nominated | |
| 2020 | 14th Sur Awards | Best Actress | Graciela Borges | Won | |
| 2020 | 14th Sur Awards | Best Adapted Screenplay | Juan José Campanella, Darren Kloomok | Nominated | |
| 2020 | 14th Sur Awards | Best Art Direction | Nelson Luty | Nominated | |
| 2020 | 14th Sur Awards | Best Costume Design | Cecilia Monti | Nominated | |
| 2020 | 14th Sur Awards | Best Makeup | Osvaldo Esperón, Sylvie Imbert, Beatushka Wojtowicz | Nominated | |
| 2020 | 14th Sur Awards | Best Cinematography | Félix Chango Monti | Nominated | |
| 2020 | 14th Sur Awards | Best Sound | José Luis Diaz | Won | |
| 2020 | 14th Sur Awards | Best Editing | Juan José Campanella | Nominated | |
| 2020 | 14th Sur Awards | Best Original Score | Emilio Kauderer | Nominated | |

== See also ==
- List of Argentine films of 2019
- List of Spanish films of 2019
