= Me, Myself and My Dead Wife =

- Argentine theatrical release poster
- Spanish: Yo, mi mujer y mi mujer muerta
- Directed by: Santi Amodeo
- Screenplay by: Santi Amodeo; Rafael Cobos
- Starring: Oscar Martínez; Carlos Areces; Ingrid García-Jonsson; Malena Solda; Cris Nollet
- Cinematography: Leonardo Hermo
- Edited by: José M. G. Moyano
- Music by: Enrique de Justo; Miguel Rivera
- Production companies: Películas Grupo Tranquilo; AZ Films
- Distributed by: Buena Vista International (ar); ConUnPack (es)
- Release dates: 21 March 2019 (Málaga); 21 March 2019 (Argentina); 26 July 2019 (Spain)
- Countries: Spain; Argentina
- Language: Spanish

Me, Myself and My Dead Wife (Spanish: Yo, mi mujer y mi mujer muerta) is a 2019 Spanish-Argentine comedy-drama film directed by Santi Amodeo from a screenplay he wrote in collaboration with Rafael Cobos. It stars Oscar Martínez alongside Ingrid García-Jonsson and Carlos Areces.

== Plot ==
Initially reluctant, widowed architect Bernardo accepts to fulfill his dead wife's wish of scattering her ashes in her Spanish homeland travelling from Buenos Aires to the Costa del Sol, where he finds out about her wife's secrets while coming across real estate agent Abi and Amalia.

== Cast ==
- Oscar Martínez as Bernardo
- Carlos Areces as Abi
- Ingrid García-Jonsson as Amalia
- Malena Solda
- Cris Nollet
- José Luis Adserías as Eugenio

== Production ==
The film is a Películas Grupo Tranquilo and AZ Films Spanish-Argentine co-production and it had the participation of Canal Sur and Movistar+. Shooting locations included Seville, Sotogrande, Marbella, and Buenos Aires.

== Release ==
The film was presented at the Málaga Film Festival on 21 March 2019. It was also set to open in Argentine theatres on 21 March 2019. Distributed by ConUnPack Distribución, it was released theatrically in Spain on 26 July 2019.

== Reception ==
Pablo O. Scholz of Clarín gave the film a 'good' rating, pointing out that Martínez carries the whole film, while citing that "little, minute by minute, scene after scene, [the film] loses the consistency it had at the beginning".

Mirito Torreiro of Fotogramas rated the film 3 out of 5 stars, highlighting Martínez's performance as the best thing about the film.

Javier Ocaña of El País assessed that "there is never a sense of unity" in the screenplay, and the promising first half hour is scuppered.

== Accolades ==
Year	Award	Category	Nominee(s)	Result	Ref.
2019	22nd Málaga Film Festival	Silver Biznaga for Best Actor	Oscar Martínez	Won	

== See also ==
- List of Argentine films of 2019
- List of Spanish films of 2019
