= The House on Wannsee Street =

- Film poster
- Spanish: La casa de Wannsee
- Directed by: Poli Martínez Kaplun
- Written by: Poli Martínez Kaplun; Esteban Student
- Produced by: Mariana Martínez; Lucas Werthein; Nora Acrich; Carlos Winograd
- Cinematography: Javier Miquelez; Hernán Menéndez; Gabriel Rosenthal Pereyra; Luciano Ciervo
- Edited by: Ernesto Felder; Miguel Colombo
- Music by: César Lerner
- Production companies: MC Producciones; INCAA
- Release date: 1 August 2019
- Running time: 70 minutes
- Country: Argentina
- Language: Spanish

The House on Wannsee Street (Spanish: La casa de Wannsee) is an Argentine documentary film written and directed by Poli Martínez Kaplun. It premiered on August 1, 2019, in Buenos Aires.

== Synopsis ==
After her son decides to celebrate his Bar mitzvah, filmmaker Poli Martínez Kaplun starts digging into the history of her ancestors, German Jews who were forced to go into exile in order to escape Nazism. This search takes her on a journey to Europe. On the outskirts of Berlin, she visits the house that used to belong to her great-grandfather, philosopher and psychologist Otto Lipmann. Through photographs, documents and interviews with family members, Martínez Kaplun rebuilds her family's history and reflects on issues such as discrimination, identity and memory.

== Critical response ==
Paula Vázquez Prieto, film critic for the Argentine newspaper La Nación, gave the film a positive review, observing that "[...] the journey of The House on Wannsee Street transcends the intimate and adopts the political as its mark [...] Martínez Kaplun is able to deconstruct memory beyond the testimonial, and her strategy is to bring about encounters in places where matters seemed to have been settled."

In the Argentine newspaper Clarín, film critic Gaspar Zimmerman wrote, "With the help of extraordinary photographs and footage from her own archive, Martínez Kaplun rebuilds her family's pilgrimage, which began in Nazi Germany."

Marina Biondi, film critic for La Butaca Web, wrote that "The documentary moves, impacts and invites viewers to want to know more about their own histories, since it shows that nothing is casual and we are all, in part, consequence of inherited experiences and events."

The website Jewish Film Review considered the documentary "very highly recommended," stating that "Martínez is a particularly deft storyteller and her story is captivating."

== Festivals and awards ==
The documentary had its international premiere at the Miami Jewish Film Festival, where it was presented as part of the Festival's Spotlight on Ibero-American Cinema and awarded the Audience Award for Best Documentary. It was also screened at the 26th San Diego Latino Film Festival, and at Dok Fest München 2020.
