= The Man Next Door (2010 film) =

- Film poster
- Directed by: Gastón Duprat & Mariano Cohn
- Written by: Andrés Duprat
- Produced by: Fernando Sokolowicz
- Starring: Rafael Spregelburd; Daniel Aráoz
- Cinematography: Gastón Duprat & Mariano Cohn
- Edited by: Klaus Borges; Jerónimo Caranza
- Music by: Sergio Pángaro
- Release date: 2 September 2010
- Running time: 110 minutes
- Country: Argentina
- Language: Spanish

The Man Next Door (Spanish: El hombre de al lado) is a 2010 Argentine comedy-drama thriller film directed by Mariano Cohn and Gastón Duprat. It was nominated for the 2010 Goya Award for Best Spanish Language Foreign Film.

== Synopsis ==
A story that exposes a clash between neighbors, and how these neighbors deal with their differences. The movie opens with a scene of a sledge hammer creating a hole on a wall that serves as a divider between the houses of two men. On one side of the screen is pure darkness, while light sheds through the hole on the wall on the other side. This contrast of light and darkness symbolizes the two different worlds of the protagonists. Leonardo (Rafael Spregelburd) is a rich and successful designer. On the other hand, Victor (Daniel Aráoz) is a used car salesman who is rough around the edges. The conflict of the movie arises when Leonardo discovers that Victor is building a window on the dividing wall. Leonardo claims that this window is illegal and that it violates his privacy because it is openly facing his living room; however, Victor declares that he just needs a little bit of sunlight, which Leonardo has received plenty of in his glass home. Throughout the movie, the men argue back and forth about the window and the problem seems irresolvable.

== Cast ==
- Rafael Spregelburd as Leonardo Kachanovsky
- Daniel Aráoz as Víctor Chubelo
- Eugenia Alonso as Ana Kachanovsky
- Inés Budassi as Lola
- Loren Acuña as Elba
- Eugenio Scopel as Uncle Carlos
- Débora Zanolli as Fabiana
- Bárbara Hang as Friend at dinner
- Juan Cruz Bordeu as Friend at dinner

== Location ==
The film was entirely shot at the Casa Curutchet (Curutchet House), the only residential house designed and built by the famous Swiss-French architect Le Corbusier in the Americas. The film takes place in La Plata, Argentina.

== Accolades ==
The movie won the Best Argentine Feature Film prize at the 24º Mar del Plata Film Festival in Argentina, the Best Cinematography Award in the World Dramatic Competition at the 2010 Sundance Film Festival, and it was selected to participate at The Lincoln Center Film Society’s and MoMA’s 2010 New Directors/New Films Festival in New York, USA. The film also won awards for Best Movie, Best Direction, and Best Original Script at Premios Sur in 2011.
