= Gastón Duprat & Mariano Cohn =

Argentine filmmakers and TV producers

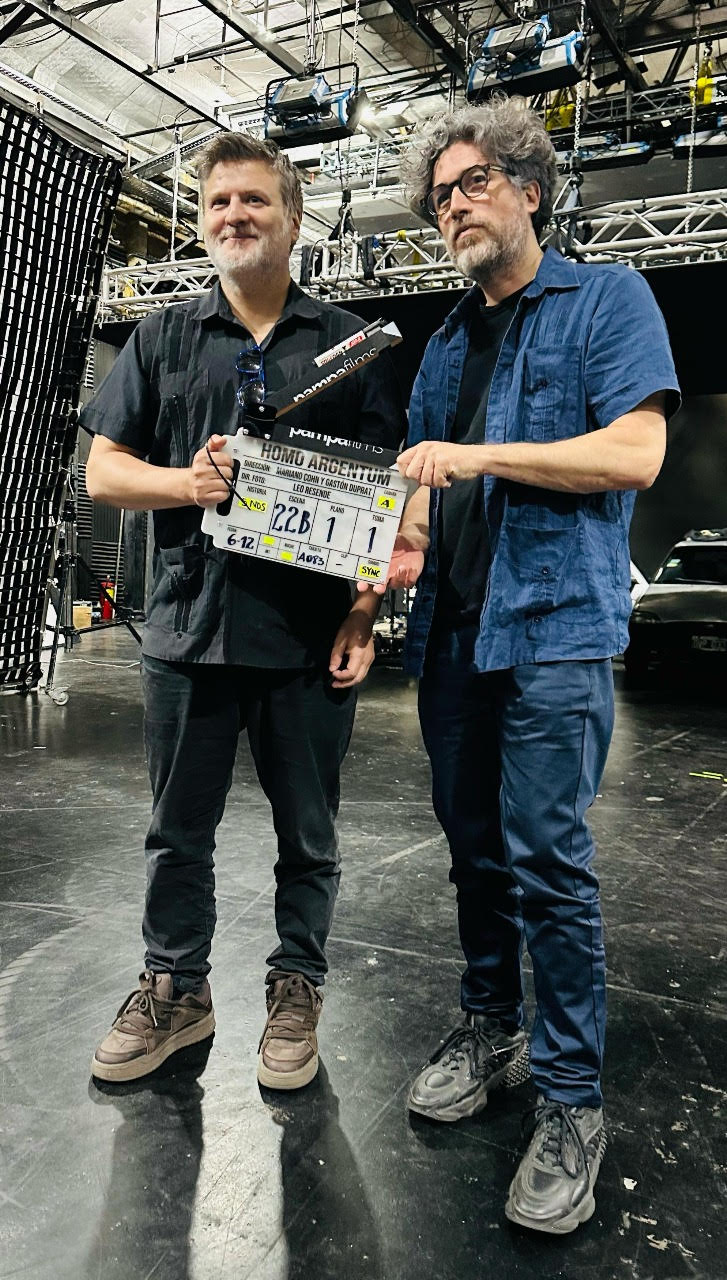
Gastón Duprat and Mariano Cohn (2024)

Mariano Cohn (born 1 December 1975, Villa Ballester, Argentina) and Gastón Duprat (born 8 December 1969, Bahía Blanca, Argentina) are an Argentine filmmaking and television series duo. They have worked together since the mid 1990s, creating a range of projects in the audiovisual field. Their distinctive style combines social commentary with humor. They have directed feature films including The Distinguished Citizen (2016), Official Competition (2022), and Homo Argentum (2025), as well as the series El encargado (2022) and Nothing (2023). Their films have been selected to compete in film festivals such as Venice, Cannes, Sundance, San Sebastián, Berlin and Toronto. Over the course of their career, they have received over 30 international awards and 50 nominations. They have worked with actors of the stature of Robert De Niro, Penélope Cruz and Antonio Banderas.

== Early steps ==
The earliest works produced by the pair were video art and experimental cinema. Many of these pieces won international awards and were exhibited in prominent museums, including the MoMA and the Solomon R. Guggenheim Museum in New York, the Centre Pompidou in Paris, the Museo Reina Sofía in Madrid, the Museo Nacional de Bellas Artes in Buenos Aires, and the Tate in London. Their works from this period include El hombre que murió dos veces (1992), Un día más en la tierra (1993), Circuito (1996), Venimos llenos de tierra (1998), Soy Francisco López (2000), Veinte Doce (2001), and Hágalo Usted Mismo (2002).

== Television ==
In the late 1990s they developed and produced the format Televisión Abierta (1998), considered the first TV reality show in the world, anticipating YouTube by years, with a very similar concept. The format was replicated in countries including Spain, Brazil, the United States, the UK, France and Japan. Subsequently, they created further innovative formats, such as Cupido (2001), El Gordo Liberosky (2002), both for the Much Music channel, Cuentos de Terror con Alberto Laiseca (2003) for the I-Sat channel, Juro que es verdad (2004) for the Infinito channel, El Amante TV (2006) for Canal á and Borges está vivo (2016) for Canal 13, together with others.

They have been directors of two television channels: Ciudad Abierta (2003), the public channel for the city of Buenos Aires, and Digo (2012), the public channel for the Province of Buenos Aires, both offering innovative ideas that fostered citizen participation.

They have also created, written and directed original series for the platform Disney+, including four seasons of El encargado (2022), a series starring Guillermo Francella and nominated for the International Emmy Award, and Nada (2023), starring Luis Brandoni and Robert De Niro.

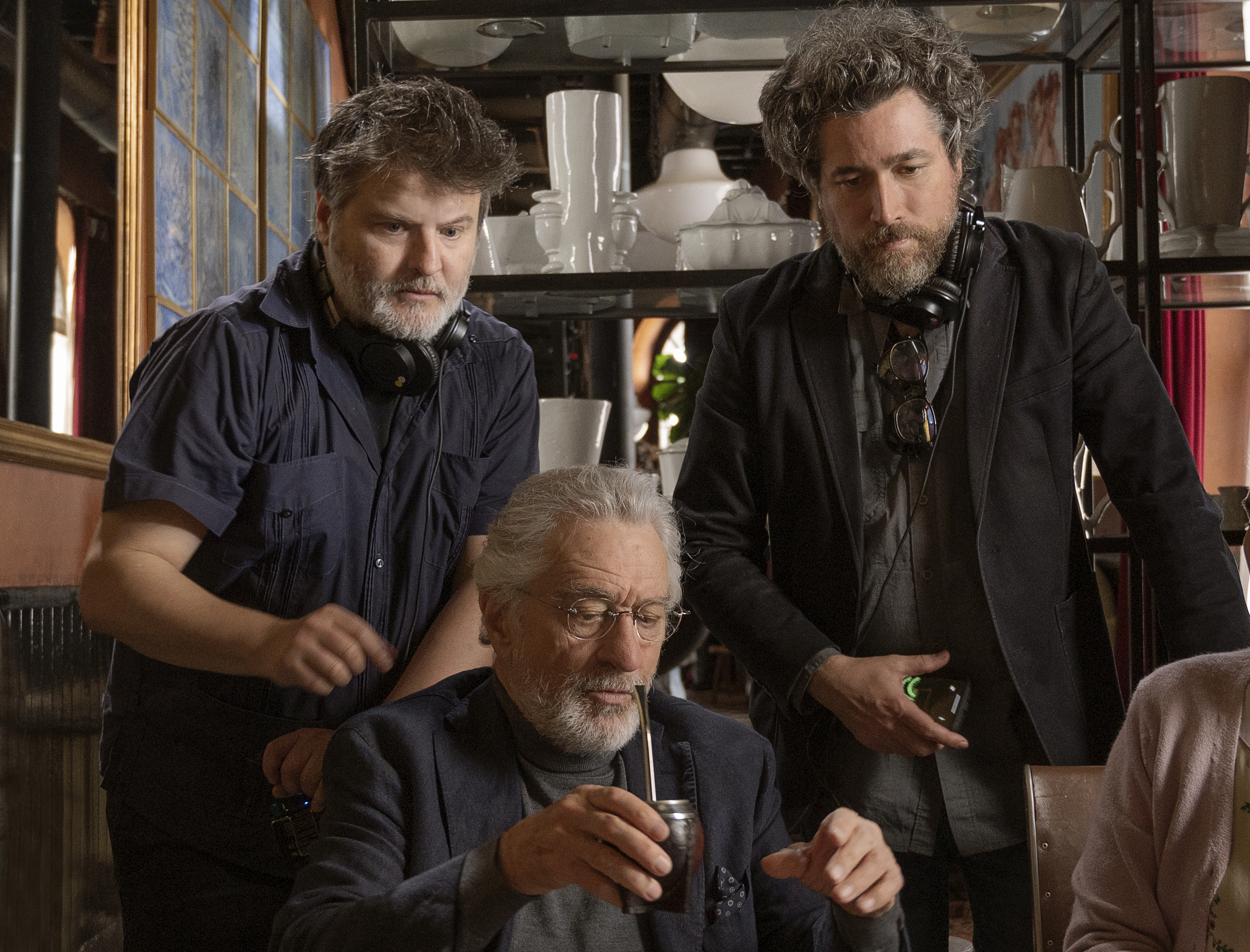
Gastón Duprat and Mariano Cohn with Robert De Niro during the filming of Nada (2022).

In October 2022, Robert De Niro was asked at a press conference which director he would like to make another film with. Bearing in mind that he has worked with directors including Martin Scorsese, Francis Ford Coppola, Sergio Leone and Quentin Tarantino, De Niro replied: “I worked on the series Nada with two wonderful directors and writers from Argentina, Gastón Duprat and Mariano Cohn. It was a great experience. They are special guys. Unique.”

Subsequently, they have directed two seasons of Bellas Artes (2024) in Spain, featuring Oscar Martínez, which was well received internationally. They are currently in post-production on their upcoming film, Homo Argentum, starring Guillermo Francella, an episodic movie shot in Argentina and Italy, set to be released in 2025, and developing international series and feature films, including several for the US market, further cementing their position as leading figures in contemporary filmmaking.

== Film ==
The pair have directed and produced the films: Enciclopedia (1998), Yo Presidente (2003), El Artista (2006), El hombre de al lado (2008), Querida voy a comprar cigarrillos y vuelvo (2011), Civilización (2012), Living Stars (2014), El Ciudadano Ilustre (2016), Todo sobre el Asado (2016), Mi Obra Maestra (2018), 4x4 (2019), and Competencia Oficial (2022), which starred Penélope Cruz and Antonio Banderas.

Several of their films have been box office hits in countries around the world, including El hombre de al lado, El Ciudadano Ilustre and Competencia Oficial, winning huge audiences in many countries. Most of their films are written by Andrés Duprat, brother of Gastón, a prominent writer and art scholar who today is the director of the National Museum of Fine Arts in Argentina.

Many of their films have seen remakes in other countries: 4x4 has had remakes made in Brazil, India and America produced by Sam Raimi and starring Bill Skarsgård and Anthony Hopkins, and Mi Obra Maestra and El Ciudadano Ilustre both have French remakes. An English US version of their feature El Hombre de al Lado is also in development.

== Filmography ==
=== Feature film ===
Year	Title	Director (s)	Writer (s)	Producer (s)	DoP (s)	Notes
2008	El Artista	Yes	Yes	No	Yes	
2009	The Man Next Door	Yes	No	No	Yes	
2011	Querida Voy a Comprar Cigarrillos y Vuelvo	Yes	Yes	Co-producers	Yes	
2016	The Distinguished Citizen	Yes	No	Co-producers	Yes	
2018	Mi Obra Secreta	No	No	Yes	No	
2018	My Masterpiece	Gaston	Gaston	Mariano	No	
2019	4x4	Mariano	Yes	Gaston	No	
2019	Hora Día Mes	No	No	Yes	No	
2021	Official Competition	Yes	Yes	No	No	
2022	A Jaula	No	Yes	No	No	
2025	Homo Argentum	Yes	Yes	No	No	

=== Documentary ===
Year	Title	Director (s)	Writer (s)	Producer (s)	Notes
1998	Enciclopedia	Yes	Yes	No	
2008	Yo Presidente	Yes	Yes	No	
2014	Living Stars	Yes	No	No	
2016	Todo Sobre el Asado	Yes	No	Yes	

== Awards by film ==
Year	Film	Award
2007	Yo, Presidente	First Prize in the International Festival of Cinema Independent from Mexico; Best Prize Documentary Movie at the Malaga Film Festival
2008	El artista	Best Movie and Best Script at the International Festival of Bursa, Turkey; The Audience Award at the Cinémas d'Amérique Latine Festival]in Toulouse, France; Best New Directors award at the 15th Lleida Film Festival, Spain
2009	El hombre de al lado	Best Argentine Feature Film prize at the 24º Mar del Plata Film Festival, Argentina; Best Cinematography Award in the World Dramatic Competition at Sundance 2010, USA; Official Slate at The Lincoln Center Film Society’s and MoMA’s New Directors New Films 2010 in New York, USA; Best Directors and Best Actors at the 16th Lleida Film Festival, Spain; Best Picture, Director, Actor and Breakthrough Actor (both to veteran television actor Daniel Aráoz), Original Screenplay and Music at Academy of Motion Picture Arts and Sciences of Argentina's Premios Sur 2010
