= Queen of Spades: Through the Looking Glass =

- Theatrical release poster
- Directed by: Aleksandr Domogarov Jr.
- Written by: Maria Ogneva; Nikolay Mitropolskiy; Anna Nasedkina; Ivan Kapitonov; Oleg Sirotkin
- Produced by: Konstantin Buslov; Vladislav Severtsev; Dmitriy Litvinov; Kristina Reylian; Dmitriy Pisarouk
- Starring: Angelina Strechina; Daniil Muravyev-Izotov; Claudia Boczar; Valeriy Pankov; Vladislav Konoplyov
- Cinematography: Aleksey Strelov
- Edited by: Vladimir Markov
- Music by: Sergei Stern
- Production companies: RB Productions; FMP Group
- Distributed by: WDSSPR
- Release date: March 14, 2019
- Running time: 83 minutes
- Country: Russia
- Language: Russian
- Budget: 78 million RUB
- Box office: 86 million RUB ($1,897,783)

Queen of Spades: Through the Looking Glass – Part 2 (Russian: Пиковая дама: Зазеркалье) is a 2019 Russian supernatural horror film directed by Aleksandr Domogarov Jr. It is based on the same urban legend as the 2015 horror film Queen of Spades: The Dark Rite. This time, the plot takes place in a boarding school, where a terrible otherworldly force embarks on a hunt for children. The film stars Angelina Strechina, Daniil Muravyev-Izotov, Claudia Boczar, Valeriy Pankov and Vladislav Konoplyov.

The film was released on March 14, 2019, in Russia by Walt Disney Studios Sony Pictures Releasing (WDSSPR).

== Plot ==
The film tells the story of students of an exclusive boarding school that recently opened in what had been an abandoned mansion. Visiting forbidden rooms, they learn that Countess Obolenskaya, the former owner of the mansion, had taken in and then killed 19 orphans, whose souls still inhabit the house. Summoned as a game, the Queen of Spades now seeks to claim the living children as well.

== Cast ==
- Angelina Strechina as Olya
- Daniil Muravyev-Izotov as Artyom, a boy
- Claudia Boczar as Countess Obolenskaya / Queen of Spades
- Valeriy Pankov as Igor Sergeevich
- Vladislav Konoplyov as Kirill
- Vladimir Kanuhin as Zhenya
- Anastasia Talyzina as Alisa
- Alyona Shvidenkova as Sonya
- Darya Belousova as Valentina, school director
- Vladimir Koshevoy as Gleb, Kirill's father
- Dmitriy Kulichkov as investigator
- Tatyana Kuznetsova as Zhenya's grandmother
- Violetta Davydovskaya as Tatiana, Olya and Artyom's Mother
- Igor Yashanin as Gosha in childhood
- Yan Alabushev as Misha in childhood

== Production ==
=== Filming ===
Principal photography began in May 2018. The main part of the filming took place in the operating sanatorium named after Herzen, located in the Odintsovsky District, Moscow Oblast.

== Release ==
Queen of Spades: Through the Looking Glass is scheduled to be released on March 14, 2019, in Russia by Walt Disney Studios Sony Pictures Releasing (WDSSPR), and was released in the United States on August 13, 2019.

== Reception ==
The budget of the film amounted to 78 355 154 rubles, of which 50 million were allocated by the Cinema Foundation of Russia (35 million on an irrevocable basis and 15 million on a refundable basis). At the box office, the film failed, collecting a little more than its budget - 86 345 224 rubles. After the online edition of Mash reported that the Cinema Foundation allegedly demanded the return of the free subsidy, the RBK Group television channel contacted the press service of the fund for clarification.

== See also ==
- Down a Dark Hall (2018 film)
