= 2nd Carmen Awards =

2023 Andalusian film awards

- Date: 4 February 2023
- Site: Auditorio Maestro Padilla, Almería, Andalusia, Spain
- Hosted by: Belén Cuesta; Salva Reina
- Organized by: Andalusian Film Academy

Highlights
- Best Picture: Prison 77
- Honorary career award: María Galiana
- Best Actor: Miguel Herrán; Prison 77
- Best Actress: Natalia de Molina; Unfinished Affairs
- Most awards: Prison 77 (13)
- Most nominations: Prison 77 (14)

Television coverage
- Network: Canal Sur

The 2nd Carmen Awards were presented by the Andalusian Film Academy on 4 February 2023 at Almería's Auditorio Maestro Padilla.

== Background ==
The ceremony enjoyed the support from Diputación Provincial de Almería, the Andalusia's Regional Ministry of Tourism, Culture and Sport, Ayuntamiento de Almería, and RTVA, and the collaboration of Fundación SGAE, EGEDA, and Andalucía Film Commission. In November 2022, actress María Galiana was announced as the recipient of the life-achievement honorary award. The 2nd edition added new categories (up to a total of 24 categories), including the recognition of the Best Spanish Film without a share of Andalusian production.

Nominations were read on 14 December 2022 by Eva Almaya and Ignacio Mateos. Belén Cuesta and Salva Reina were later disclosed as the gala hosts. The gala featured musical performances by María Peláe, Abraham Mateo, Nuria Fergó, and The Gardener.

Prison 77 swept the awards, winning in every single category it was nominated for.

The awards trophies were made of bronze, replacing the resin trophies bestowed at the first edition.

== Nominees ==
The winners and nominees are listed as follows:

Best Fiction Feature Film: Prison 77; The Rite of Spring; Unfinished Affairs; The Gentiles	Best Director: Alberto Rodríguez — Prison 77; Alexis Morante — Oliver's Universe; Fernando Franco — The Rite of Spring; Juan Miguel del Castillo — Unfinished Affairs; Santi Amodeo — The Gentiles
Best Original Screenplay: Rafael Cobos, Alberto Rodríguez — Prison 77; Laura Hojman — A las mujeres de España. María Lejárraga; Fernando Franco, Begoña Arostegui — The Rite of Spring; Santi Amodeo — The Gentiles	Best Adapted Screenplay: Alexis Morante, Raúl Santos, Miguel Ángel González — Oliver's Universe; Juan Miguel del Castillo, José Rodríguez — Unfinished Affairs; Antonio Palacios — Los negros; Paco León, Javier Gullón — Rainbow
Best Actor: Miguel Herrán — Prison 77; Salva Reina — Oliver's Universe; Antonio de la Torre — On the Edge; Paco León — Staring at Strangers	Best Actress: Natalia de Molina — Unfinished Affairs; Lisi Linder — Football Heroes of the Block; Ángela Molina — Piety; Belén Cuesta — A Boyfriend for My Wife
Best Supporting Actor: Jesús Carroza — Prison 77; Pedro Casablanc — Oliver's Universe; Ken Appledorn — Con los años que me quedan; Fernando Tejero — Prison 77	Best Supporting Actress: Paula Díaz — The Gentiles; Estefanía de los Santos — Con los años que me quedan; María León — Oliver's Universe; Mona Martínez — Unfinished Affairs; Mercedes Hoyos — Sin ti no puedo
Best New Actor: Lorca Gutiérrez Prada — Oliver's Universe; Alfonso Valenzuela — El mundo es vuestro; Fran Caballero — Unfinished Affairs; Ayax Pedrosa — Rainbow	Best New Actress: África de la Cruz — The Gentiles; Cristina Domínguez — A las mujeres de España. María Lejárraga; Teresa Refojo — El mundo es vuestro; Alicia Moruno — Val del Omar, poeta audiovisual
Best New Director: Nuria Vargas — Controverso; Jesús Pascual — ¡Dolores guapa!; Juanma Sayalonga, David Sainz — Eterna; Hugo Cabezas, Alejandro Toro — Últimas unidades	Best Original Score: Julio de la Rosa — Prison 77; Pablo Cervantes — A las mujeres de España. María Lejárraga; Paloma Peñarrubia — La vida chipén; Bronquio, Santi Amodeo — The Gentiles
Best Original Song: "Nana a medias" by Antonio Manuel with Rocío Márquez, Javier Prieto (Pico Reja. La verdad que la tierra esconde); "El mundo es vuestro" by Diego Muñoz Fajardo, Saturnino Rey García, Eric Rafael Cunningham Sarabia, Juan Cantón Vega, Óscar Luis Sánchez Pérez (El mundo es vuestro); "Un paraíso en el sur" by Paloma Peñarrubia, Vanesa Benítez (La vida chipén); "Todo lo que llega un día se va" by Bronquio, Sebastián Orellana (The Gentiles)	Best Cinematography: Álex Catalán — Prison 77; Adonis Macías, Beatriz Hohenleiter — A las mujeres de España. María Lejárraga; Alejandro Espadero — El mundo es vuestro; Alberto Pareja — Football Heroes of the Block; Antonio Galisteo — La vida chipén; Luis Castilla Romero — Pico Reja. La verdad que la tierra esconde
Best Production Supervision: Manuela Ocón Aburto — Prison 77; María Cancio — El mundo es vuestro; Sandra Rodríguez, Marta Velasco — Unfinished Affairs; Esther Diana — The Gentiles	Best Documentary Feature Film: A las mujeres de España. María Lejárraga; Controverso; Pico Reja. La verdad que la tierra esconde; Val del Omar, poeta audiovisual
Best Editing: José M. G. Moyano — Prison 77; Laura Hojman, Guillermo Rojas — A las mujeres de España. María Lejárraga; Manuel Terceño — Unfinished Affairs; José M. G. Moyano, Darío García García — The Gentiles	Best Costume Design: Fernando García — Prison 77; Rocío Olid — A las mujeres de España. María Lejárraga; Lourdes Fuentes — Oliver's Universe; Esther Vaquero — The Rite of Spring
Best Sound: Dani de Zayas, Miguel Huete, Valeria Arcieri — Prison 77; Diana Sagrista, Vicente Villaescusa — Oliver's Universe; Dani de Zayas — The Rite of Spring; Dani de Zayas, Jorge Marín — Unfinished Affairs; Dani de Zayas, Carli Pérez Valero, Jorge Marín — The Gentiles	Best Art Direction: Pepe Domínguez del Olmo — Prison 77; Lala Obrero — Football Heroes of the Block; Vanesa de la Haza — Unfinished Affairs; Ana Medina — The Gentiles
Best Makeup and Hairstyles: Yolanda Piña, Félix Terreno — Prison 77; María Liaño, Rafael Mora — The Rite of Spring; Ana Beato, Rafael Mora — Unfinished Affairs; Carmela Martín, Ana Medina Sánchez — The Gentiles	Best Special Effects: Juan Ventura, Amparo Martínez — Oliver's Universe; Israel Millán — El mundo es vuestro; Amparo Martínez — Unfinished Affairs; Amparo Martínez, Laura Domínguez — The Gentiles
Best Fiction Short Film: Cosas de niños; El productor; La vida entre dos noches; Se van sus naves - Enciende TV	Best Documentary Short Film: Nos acompañamos; @Buddhistandqueer del sari a la túnica; Caballo de espuma; Las alturas
Best Non-Andalusian Produced Film: The Beasts; Alcarràs; Lullaby; Motherhood
