= Ken Appledorn =

American actor

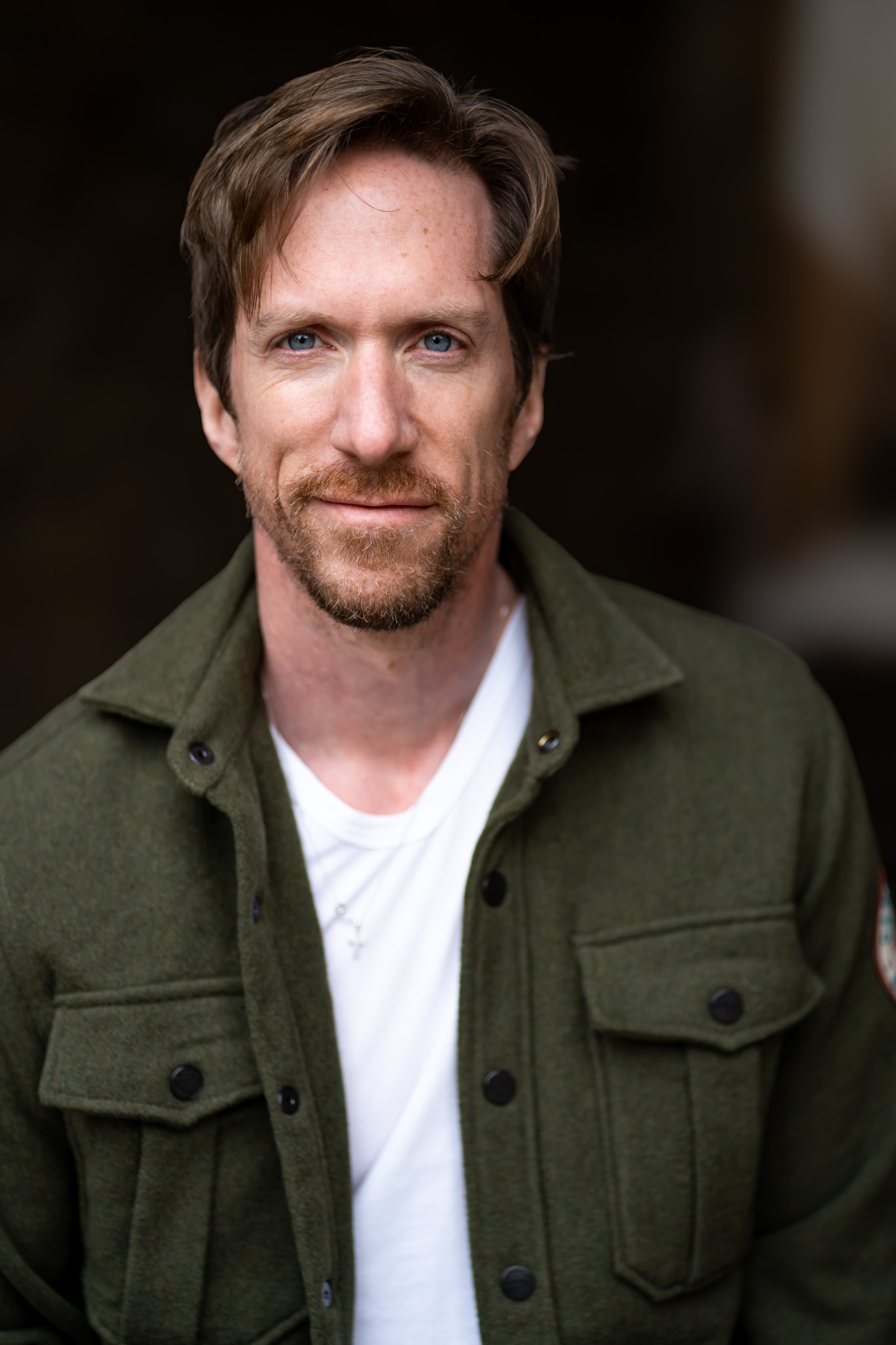
- Appledorn in 2020
- Born: Kenneth James Appledorn; 20 July 1980 (age 46)
- Education: University of Michigan
- Occupation: Actor
- Years active: 2009–present
- Spouse: Jorge Cadaval (m. 2007)

Kenneth James "Ken" Appledorn, is an American-Spanish actor and television presenter based in Spain. Known for his work in European film and television, he gained recognition for his roles in the Movistar+ series Arde Madrid, directed by Paco León, and the BBC/Atresmedia co-production The Refugees. Appledorn won the Best Supporting Actor award at the Málaga Film Festival for the film Casting (2013) and hosts the cultural documentary series Cervantes en el mundo for Spanish national broadcaster RTVE and the Instituto Cervantes.

== Biography ==
Ken Appledorn grew up in Troy, Michigan, a suburb of Detroit. He is the youngest of four boys. He attended Troy High School where he participated in theatre and drama, however went on study business administration and Mathematics at the University of Michigan Ross School of Business. Upon graduation he traveled to Sevilla, Spain and began studying Spanish and decided what better way than through theatre and began studying at Teatro Viento Sur and El Centro Andaluz de Teatro His first break came when David Fernández Sainz-Rozas, creator of the series Malviviendo asked Appledorn to be the lead in a sketch comedy series "El viaje de Peter McDowell", centering on the adventures of an Englishman in the south of Spain. Due to its success (over 10 million views) Appledorn began appearing in several other Spanish television series and had a secondary character in the series "¡Qué buen puntito!" (2011), alongside two of Spain's best comedians, Los Morancos In 2007, Appledorn and Jorge Cadaval, one-half of the comedy duo Los Morancos, were married in Sevilla, Spain.

In 2013 Appledorn appeared in the film "Casting" which premiered at the Festival de Málaga de Cine Español, where he won the award for best secondary actor. That same year he also participated in the film "Obra 67", a film recorded in 13 hours that premiered at the Sevilla European Film Festival. Later that year he appeared in "The Extraordinary Tale of the Times Table", his first film as a leading man. He was nominated as best Spanish actor in the Andalucian Film Awards (ASECAN) as well as best actor at the Cardiff Film Festival. In 2015 was as a series regular in The Refugees, a joint production of BBC Worldwide and Atresmedia and in 2016 a series regular in "La Brigada de Fenómenos" shown on Canal Sur TV and ¨Entertainment¨ a web series seen by over 5 million viewers. In 2018, Appledorn filmed the series "Arde Madrid" as a series regular in the role of Bill Gallagher, Ava Gardner´s secretary. The series is produced by Movistar+ and directed by Paco Leon. In 2019, Appledorn filmed the thriller Malnazidos, produced by Sony Pictures and Mediaset directed by Javier Ruíz Caldera and Alberto del Toro and La Lista de Los Deseos directed by Alvaro Díaz Lorenzo. In 2021 he recorded the film Official Competition, starring Penelope Cruz and Antonio Banderas and is working as a journalist in the show Como Sapiens.

== Film ==
- 2027: Becoming Capa
- 2026: Trinidad
- 2024: El Hoyo 2
- 2023: Un hombre de acción
- 2022: El universo de Óliver
- 2022: Héroes de barrio
- 2020: Malnazidos
- 2020: Rifkin's Festival
- 2019: Bears love me!
- 2019: La lista
- 2018: Fishbone
- 2017: Lugares
- 2016: Todo es de color
- 2014: La ignorancia de la sangre
- 2014: Anochece en la India
- 2014: La tristeza de Kevin Brownie (Short)
- 2013: The Extraordinary Tale
- 2013: Obra 67
- 2013: Casting
- 2012: The Impostor
- 2009: Brain Drain
- 2009: Madre amadísima

== Television ==
- 2026: Cervantes en el mundo (8 episodes)
- 2025: El Centro (6 episodes)
- 2024: En Fin (2 episodes)
- 2023: Dias Mejores Temporada 2
- 2021: Now and Then
- 2021: Como Sapiens
- 2020: El último show
- 2019: Élite
- 2018: Arde Madrid (6 episodes)
- 2018: Allí abajo
- 2016: Brigada de Fenómenos
- 2015: The Refugees (8 episodes)
- 2015: Entertainment
- 2009-2014: Malviviendo (4 episodes)
- 2013: Museo Coconut
- 2013: The Avatars
- 2013: Flaman (12 episodes)
- 2011: ¡Qué buen puntito! (20 episodes)
- 2011: Bandolera
- 2010: Aída
- 2009: Yo soy Bea
