= Maggie Civantos =

Spanish actress (born 1984)

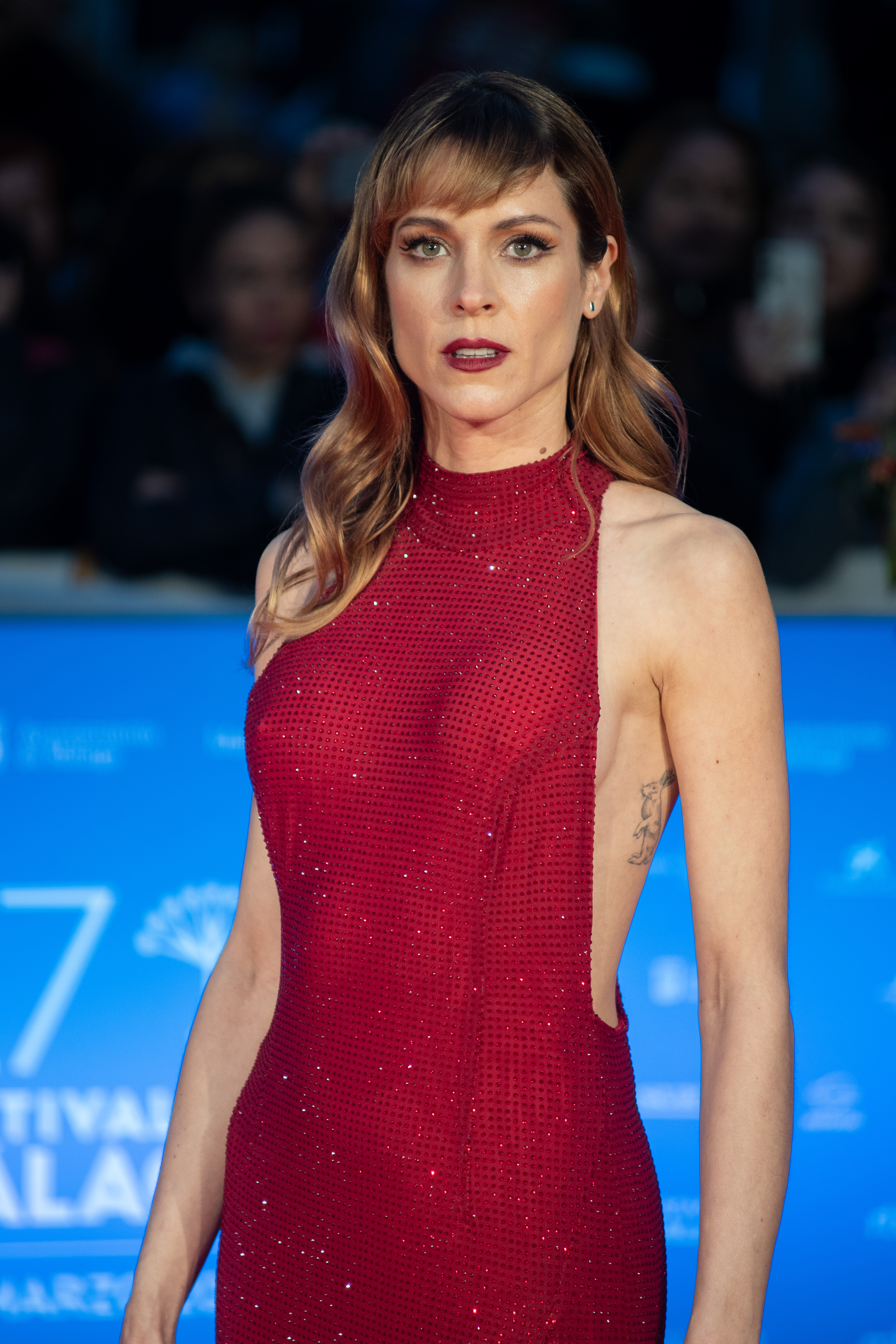
- Civantos in 2024
- Born: 28 December 1984 (age 41); Málaga, Andalusia, Spain
- Education: Escuela Superior de Arte Dramático de Málaga
- Occupation: Actress
- Years active: 2004–present

Maggie Civantos (Spanish pronunciation: [ˈmaɣi θiˈβantos]; born 28 December 1984) is a Spanish actress, best known for her starring role of Macarena Ferreiro in the prison series Locked Up (Vis a vis). She has since starred in series such as Cable Girls, Malaka, Vis a vis: El oasis and Express.

== Biography ==
Born in Málaga on 28 December 1984, her mother is a singer and her father is a sound technician. She was named after the character Maggie Gioberti, played by Susan Sullivan, in the TV series Falcon Crest.

== Career ==
She began her career in Escenas de matrimonio replacing Mar Saura, Hospital central and Yo soy Bea. In 2008, she starred the TV series Eva y kolegas by Antena 3. She played Angélica in the Canal Sur Televisión TV series Arrayán.

In 2014, she had her first important role as Fanny in Bienvenidos al Lolita. Her biggest role was as Macarena, the main character in the 2015 TV series Vis a vis. In 2017 she appeared in the first Spanish Netflix original series Cable Girls (Las chicas del cable) alongside Blanca Suárez, Ana Fernández and Nadia de Santiago.

She returned as Macarena in the spin-off Vis a vis: El oasis, starring with Najwa Nimri. She appears along Salva Reina in Malaka.

She founded the production outfit Bastardas Films, which co-produced Stories.

In May 2025, she was reported to be shooting her directorial debut feature, El retorno de Júpiter, which she also produced and wrote.

== Filmography ==
=== Feature films ===
Year	Title	Role	Notes	Ref.
2008	Prime Time	Asesora de marketing	Feature film debut	
2011	Amanecidos			
2013	Temporal	Rosario		
2014	321 días en Míchigan (321 Days in Michigan)	Lola		
2014	Crustáceos			
2018	El mejor verano de mi vida (The Best Summer of My Life)	Zoe		
2018	Alegría tristeza (Happy Sad)	Sandra		
2018	Escombros			
2019	Antes de la quema (The Burning)	Meme		
2019	La pequeña Suiza (The Little Switzerland)	Yolanda		
2019	La influencia (The Influence)	Sara		
2023	El juego	Eva		
2024	Jaque mate (Checkmate)	Sofía		
2024	Historias (Stories)			
2026	Kraken: El libro negro de las horas (Kraken: The Black Book of Hours)	Esti		
2026	Días de agosto (Summer Days)	Mónica		

=== Short films ===
- Las rubias (TBA)
- El juego (TBA)
- Historias (2022)
- La chica de los cigarrillos (2021) as Eva
- Mejor actriz (2019)
- Ahora seremos felices (2018) as Clara
- Alan (2018) as Helen
- Downunder (2017)
- Las rubias (2016) as Marta
- Rubita (2014) as Norma
- Cobayas: Human Test (2014) as Helena
- Rem (2013) as Gem
- Hidrolisis (2012) as Sandra
- Placer (2009) as Leo / Adrian's ex-gf
- CineMálaga (2009) as Rose
- L.A: Los Ángeles (2007)
- Sobreexpuestos (2005)
- El que espera (2004) as Eli
- Kinoglaz (2004)

=== Television series ===
- The Turkish Passion (2024) as Olivia
- Express as Bárbara
- High Seas
- Vis a vis: El oasis (2020) as Macarena Ferreiro
- Malaka (2019) as Blanca
- Vis a vis (2015–2019) as Macarena Ferreiro
- Las chicas del cable (2017–2020) as Ángeles Vidal
- Indetectables (2017) as Lina
- Temporada baja (2016)
- Ciega a citas (2014) as Sonia
- Bienvenidos al Lolita (2014) as Fanny
- El tiempo entre costuras (2013) as Marita
- Arrayán (2012–2013) as Angélica
- Toledo (2012)
- Hospital Central (2009–2011) as Candela Hernández / Águeda
- La Mari 2 (2009) as Estrella
- Escenas de matrimonio (2009) as Alba Boguñá
- Yo soy Bea (2009)
- Eva y kolegas (2008) as Marta

== Awards and nominations ==
Year	Award	Category	Work	Result	Ref.
2015	3rd MiM Series Awards	Best Drama Actress	Locked Up	Won	
2016	25th Actors and Actresses Union Awards	Best Television Actress in a Leading Role	Locked Up	Won	
2017	4th Feroz Awards	Best Main Actress in a Series	Locked Up	Nominated	
2017	26th Actors and Actresses Union Awards	Best Television Actress in a Leading Role	Locked Up	Nominated	
2021	71st Fotogramas de Plata	Best Television Actress	Vis a vis: El Oasis	Nominated	
2025	4th Carmen Awards	Best Actress	Stories	Pending	
