= Eterna (disambiguation) =

Eterna is a Swiss watch company. Eterna may also refer to:

- EteRNA, a 2010 browser-based game developed by scientists
- Eterna (film), a 2020 Spanish documentary
- Eterna (record label), a label of former East German music publisher VEB Deutsche Schallplatten
- Eterna, a Fujifilm movie film emulsion
- Eterna Mode A shirt and blouse maker from Passau in Germany founded in 1853.

== See also ==
- Aeterna (TV series), a Russian fantasy series of which only the 2022 pilot has aired
