= Aïda Ballmann =

Spanish actress

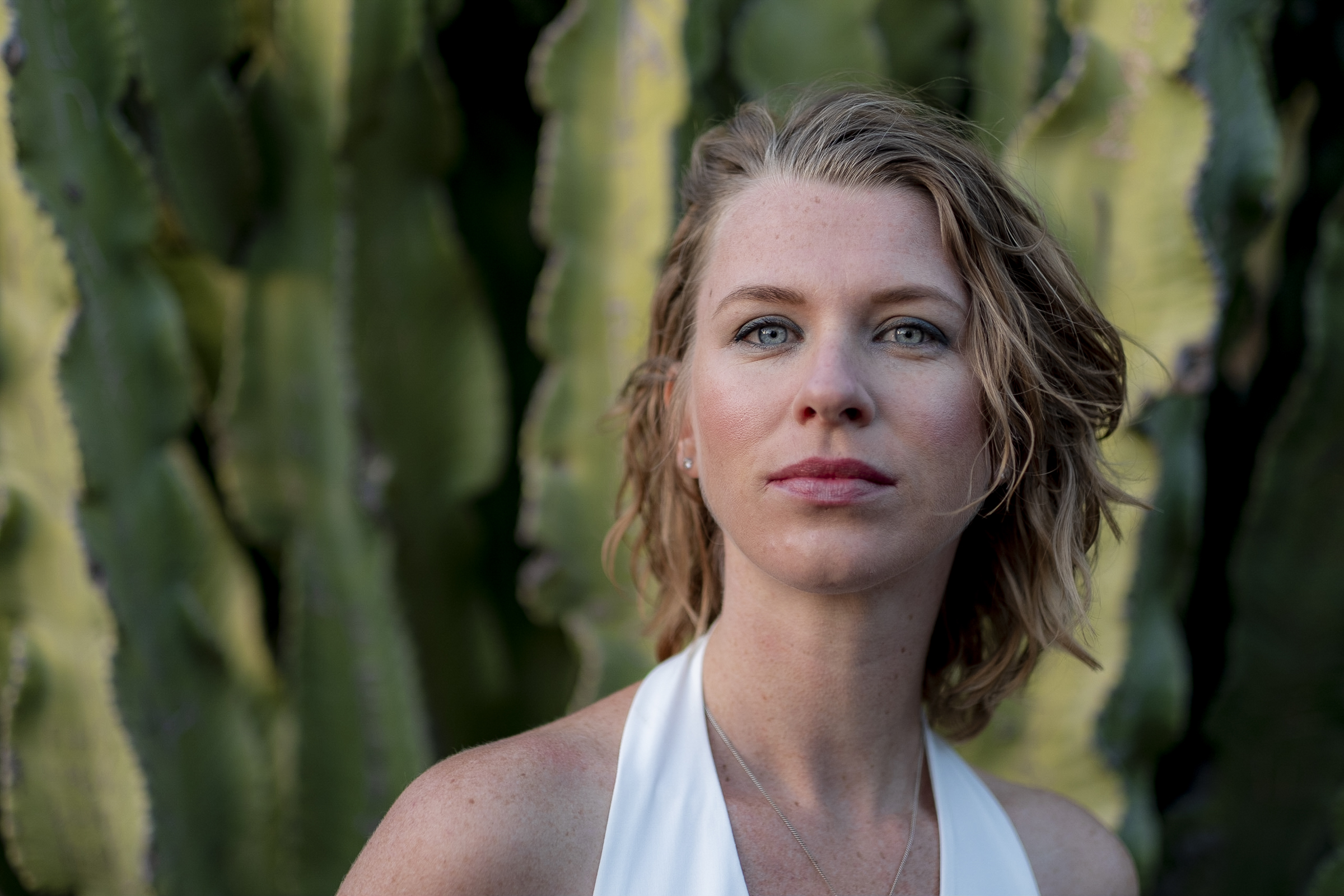
- Aïda Ballmann (©Selu Vega)
- Born: Canary Islands, Spain
- Occupation: Actress
- Years active: 2006 – present
- Notable work: The Extraordinary Tale
- Website: https://aidaballmann.com/en/

Aïda Ballmann is an actress, director, and producer from the Canary Islands.

== Early life and education ==
Aïda Ballmann studied acting in Gijón, and graduated in Seville in 2009. She trained in the Meisner technique in Germany and Spain.

== Career ==
Ballmann's early theatre work were with the companies La Sonrisa del Lagarto, Fauna y Arte, and La Carbonería de la Lola, with which she appeared in more than twelve productions.

She also worked as a stunt performer, which led her to participate in the productions El Oro del Rin and La Valquiria by La Fura dels Baus.

In 2012, Ballmann made her feature film debut, The Extraordinary Tale of the Times Table, by J.F. Ortuño and Laura Alvea, shot in English, for which she won the Best Actress award at the Cardiff Independent Film Festival. and at Film Bizarro. She was nominated for best actress at the Andalusian Film Writers' Association Awards (ASECAN), and received coverage in publications such as The Hollywood Reporter.

She won the Best Actress award at the Festivalito for Perséfone and received the Leoncio Morales Award for her contribution to the culture of her home island.

Ballmann appeared in television series such as Operación Barrio Inglés, Una vida menos en Canarias, Endlich Witwer, Crossfire, Lo que escondían sus ojos, El Tiempo entre Costuras, Águila Roja, Brigada de Fenómenos and Malviviendo. She has also appeared in several Spanish and international feature films, including La Velocidad de nuestros Pensamientos by Nacho Chueca, the German production Die Insel by Lars Ostmann, El Gigante y la Sirena by Roberto Chinet, Atlánticas by Guillermo García López, The Europeans by Víctor García León, Gleich by Jeniffer Castañeda, The metamorphosis of Narcissus, by the Iranian director Hamed Alizadeh, L´avia i el foraster by Sergi Miralles (winner of four awards at the Alicante Film Festival) or True Crime by Marco Oliva.

Among her short films, Five Minutes by Genesis Lence and co-starring her sister Serai Ballmann, stands out. Its world premiere was at the Short Film Corner section of the 74th Cannes Film Festival. For this work, Ballmann was nominated for best actress at VIFA 2022.

Ballmann's made her directorial and producing debut with the documentary Sand Path.

== Filmography ==
Title	Director	Character	Year
True Crime	Marco Oliva	Elena	2026
A una isla de ti	Alexis Morante	Lara	2026
Un hombre tras un rifle	Marco Oliva	Matilda & Luisa	2025
The end of it	María Martínez Bayona	Doctor	2025
Satisfayer (corto)	Aïda Ballmann & Carmen Corchs	Candela	2025
Un infierno paradisíaco (corto)	Aïda Ballmann & Carmen Corchs	Candela	2025
L´avia i el foraster	Sergi Miralles	Julia	2024
The metamorphosis of Narcissus	Hamed Alizadeh	María	2024
Gleich	Jeniffer Castañeda	Ebba	2023
Five Minutes (corto)	Genesis Lence	Aida	2021
Los europeos (The Europeans)	Víctor García León	Erika	2020
Sand Path	self	self	2018
El Gigante y La Sirena	Roberto Chinet	Lavinia	2017
La velocidad de nuestros pensamientos	Nacho Chueca	Erika von Brücken	2017
Die Insel	Lars Ostmann	self	2016
Perséfone (short film)	Cándido Perez Armas	Perséfone	2016
La Paradoja de la Calle Real (short film)	Selu Vega	Lucía	2015
Golosinas (short film)	Iván López	Ana	2014
Podredumbes (short film)	Juan Carlos Guerra	Linda	2014
The Extraordinary Tale	Laura Alvea and José F. Ortuño	She	2013

== TV credits ==
Title	Episode	Character	Year
Malnombre	6	Pilar	2025
Frauds	1	Bracelet woman	2025
Una vida menos en Canarias	2	Erin Kelly	2024
Operación Barrio Inglés	8	Miss Eva	2024
Endlich Witwer 3	TV movie	Frau Zindler	2023
Atlánticas	El Hierro and Clara Lago	Self	2018
Lo que escondían sus ojos	3	Hilde	2016
Air	5	Brigitte	2015
Brigada de fenomenos	1	Vampire	2015
Águila Roja	1	Spy	2014
El tiempo entre costuras	2	Anke Von Fries	2013
Malviviendo	1	Russian	2011

== Theater ==
Title	Company	Character	Year
Recetas para el Alma	La carbonería de la lola	Mía	2021
Principios	Colectivo Amazonas	La científica del amor	2020
Mi vida con Pablo	Micro teather Granada	Main cast	2014
Evidentemente	Micro teather Sevilla	Main cast	2012
El oro del Rhin	Fura del Baus	Stunwoman	2011
Valquiria	Fura del Baus	Stunwoman	2010
La Despedida	La sonrisa del lagarto	Federica	2008
Boneca	La sonrisa del lagarto	Nina	2006

== Awards ==
Year	Award	Category	Work	Result	Reference
2022	VIFA	Best Actress	Five minutes	Nominated	
2020	Spotlight International Film Festival	Best Runner up/ Documentary TV Short	Sand Path	Nominated	
2015	Festivalito	Best Actress	Persefone	Won	
2014	ASECAN	Best Actress	The Extraordinary Tale	Nominated	
2014	Cardiff International Film Festival	Best Actress	The Extraordinary Tale	Won	
2013	Film Bizarro	Best Actress	The Extraordinary Tale	Won	
