= Gata Cattana =

Spanish rapper (1991–2017)

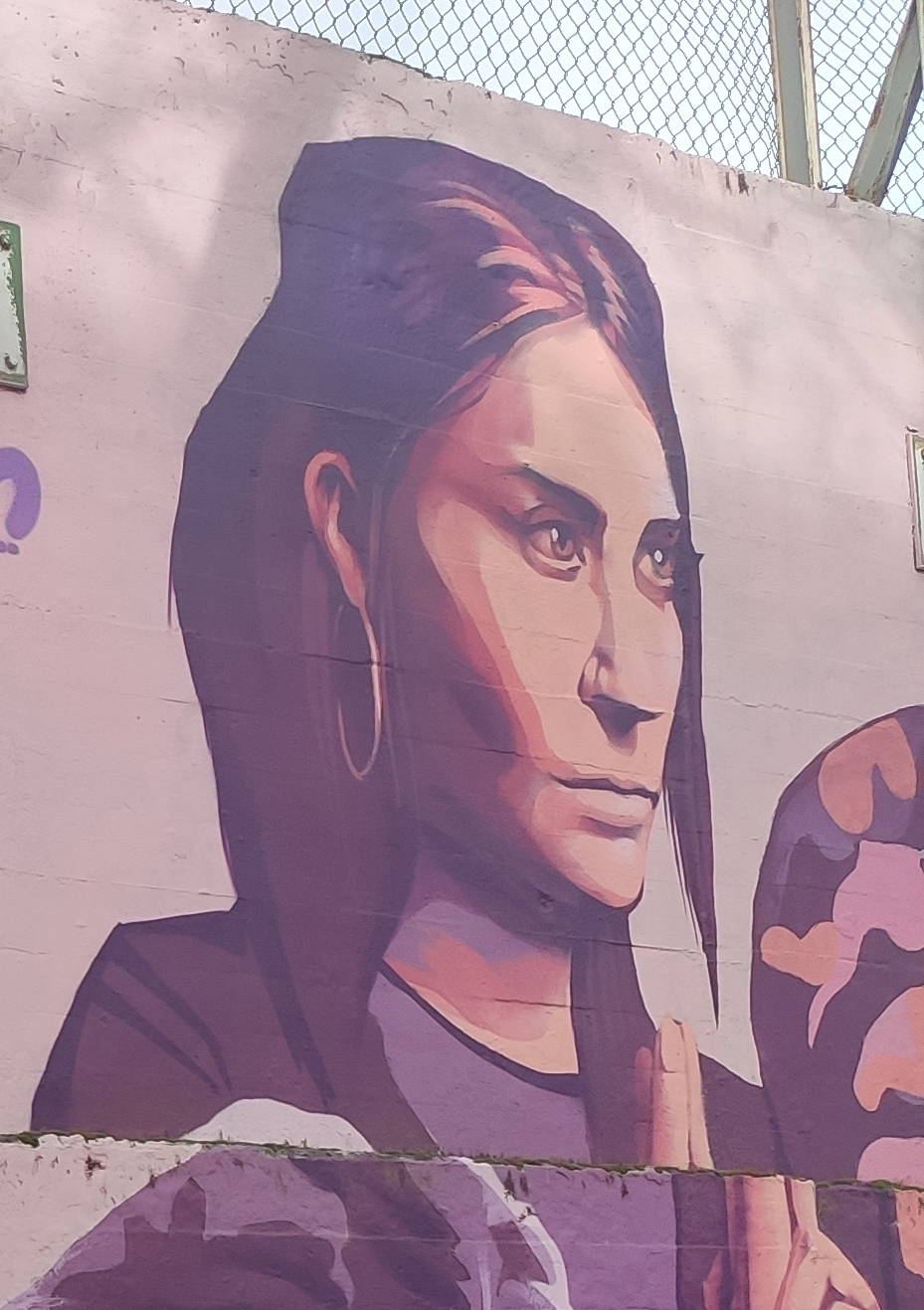
- Mural painting in Ciudad Lineal
- Born: Ana Isabel García Llorente; 11 May 1991; Adamuz, Andalusia, Spain
- Died: 2 March 2017 (aged 25); Madrid, Spain
- Other name: Ana Sforza
- Occupations: Rapper; poet
- Musical career
- Genres: Hip hop
- Years active: 2012–2017

Ana Isabel García Llorente (11 May 1991 – 2 March 2017), known as Gata Cattana and Ana Sforza, was a Spanish feminist rapper and poet.

In her career she managed to combine hip hop and electronic music with various themes and styles such as feminism and politics. Her lyrics referenced to Andalusian culture, to the mythological topoi of the ancient age – especially Greek, Roman and ancient Egyptian literature – as well as poetry, philosophy and mass culture; her recurring themes included introspection, dialectical materialism, Andalusism, anti-globalization, existentialism and socialist feminism.

She died in the wake of an anaphylactic shock in 2017.

A documentary film about her life and work, Eterna, premiered in 2022.

== Discography ==
=== Studio albums ===
- Inéditos 2015 (2015)
- Banzai (2017)

=== Extended plays ===
- Los siete contra Tebas (2012)
- Anclas (2015)

=== Singles ===
- "Samsara" (2016)
- "Banzai" (2017)
- "Hermano inventor" (2017)

== Bibliography ==
- Gata Cattana (2016). La escala de Mohs. self-printed.
- Gata Cattana (2017). La escala de Mohs. La Muela: Arcesis.
- Gata Cattana (2019). La escala de Mohs. Barcelona-Madrid: Aguilar. (New edition with extra content)
- Gata Cattana (2020). No vine a ser carne. Barcelona-Madrid: Aguilar.
