= María de Nati =

Spanish actress (born 1997)

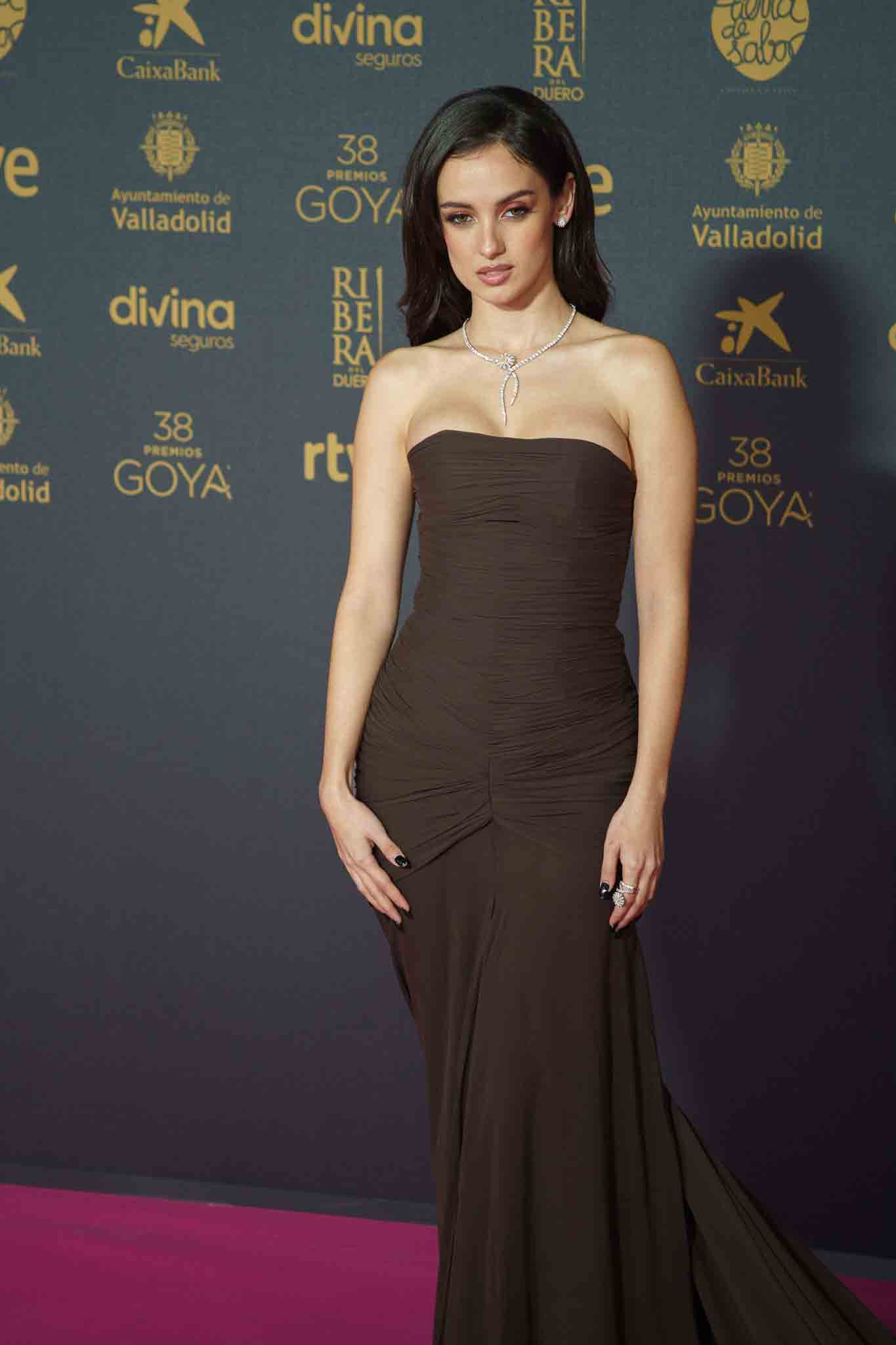
- De Nati at the 38th Goya Awards, 2024
- Born: María Díaz; 11 June 1997 (age 29); Madrid, Spain
- Occupation: Actress
- Years active: 2014–present

María Díaz (born 11 June 1997), better known as María de Nati, is a Spanish actress known for her multiple appearances in television series, especially in El secreto de Puente Viejo (2015–2016), Victim Number 8 (2018), and Madres. Amor y vida (2020–2021). She has also participated in the films May God Save Us (2016), The Realm (2018), If I Were Rich (2019) and The Good Boss (2021).

== Life and career ==
María Díaz was born in Madrid on 11 June 1997, she debuted in television with appearances in Red Eagle and El Rey. In the latter series she portrayed Pilar de Borbón. She then joined the cast of Antena 3 soap opera El secreto de Puente Viejo in the role of Prado Castañeda.

In 2016 she played the character of Elena in the film May God Save Us, making her feature film debut. A year later, she participated in the series Monica Chef, Reinas, Apaches and Disney Cracks.

In 2018 she participated in Rodrigo Sorogoyen's new film, The Realm, and had a leading role in television series Victim Number 8, where she played Edurne. In addition, she participated in other fictions such as La verdad for Telecinco or the first season of Bajo la red for Playz. She also starred in the series Todo por el juego for the Movistar+ platform.

In 2019 she participated in the second season of Bajo la red and recorded the web-series Terror.app for Flooxer, Atresmedia's digital platform. In addition, she also had a small role in the film Si yo fuera rico. In 2020 she participated in one of the episodes of the second season of Gente hablando for Flooxer and got one of the supporting roles in Madres.Amor y vida for Telecinco and Amazon Prime Video, playing Juani Soler. She remained in the supporting cast for the first two seasons of the series and moved up to the main cast in the third season.

In 2021 she signed for Deudas for Atresplayer Premium, playing Sara. In addition, it was announced her signing for Aitor Gabilondo's new series for Telecinco, Wrong Side of the Tracks, which has José Coronado and Luis Zahera in its cast. In 2021 she also premiered the feature film El buen patrón, starring Javier Bardem and directed by Fernando León de Aranoa, which had its preview at the San Sebastián International Film Festival.

In 2023, she starred as pornographic actress and Nacho Vidal's partner Sara Bernat in biographical series Nacho. She also starred in historical sports drama series Las pelotaris 1926, portraying Itzi Galarrán, a promising Basque pelota player navigating a fraught love affair with Ane while marrying a male friend to hide her lesbianism.

== Filmography ==
=== Television ===
Year	Title	Channel	Role	Notes	Ref.
2014	El Rey	Telecinco	Pilar de Borbón	1 episode	
2015	Águila Roja	La 1	Extra	1 episode	
2015–16	El secreto de Puente Viejo	Antena 3	Prado Castañeda	199 episodes	
2017	Queens: The Virgin and the Martyr	La 1	Extra	1 episode	
2017	Mónica Chef	Disney Channel Italia	Vanesa Salazar	17 episodes	
2017	Apaches	Antena 3	Carol	1 episode	
2017–18	Disney Cracks	Disney XD	Daniela	22 episodes	
2018	La verdad	Telecinco	Marta Rivelles	3 episodes	
2018	Victim Number 8	Telemadrid / ETB	Edurne Aranguren	8 episodes	
2018–19	Bajo la red	Playz	Irene Velázquez	13 episodes	
2018–19	Todo por el juego	Directv / Movistar+	Lucrecia	16 episodes	
2019	Terror.app	Flooxer	Elena Mangado	6 episodes	
2019	Circular	Playz	Sara de la Fuente	5 episodes	
2020	Gente hablando	Flooxer	Daughter	1 episode	
2020	Adentro	YouTube	Maite	1 episode	
2020	Encrucijada	Movistar+	María Blanco	1 episode	
2020–22	Madres. Amor y vida	Telecinco / Prime Video	Juani Soler	27 episodes	
2021	Deudas	Antena 3	Sara de la Vega	13 episodes	
2022–23	Wrong Side of the Tracks	Telecinco	Nata	10 episodes	
2023	Nacho	Atresplayer Premium	Sara Bernat		
2023	Las pelotaris 1926		Itzi		
2024	Las abogadas		Sole		
2024	¿A qué estás esperando? †				

=== Cinema ===
Year	Title	Character	Directed by
2016	Que Dios nos perdone (May God Save Us)	Elena	Rodrigo Sorogoyen
2018	El reino (The Realm)	Nati	Rodrigo Sorogoyen
2019	Si yo fuera rico (If I Were Rich)	Tania	Álvaro Fernández Armero
2021	El buen patrón (The Good Boss)	Ángela	Fernando León de Aranoa
2024	Al otro barrio †		
