= Javier Aureliano García =

Spanish politician (born 1976)

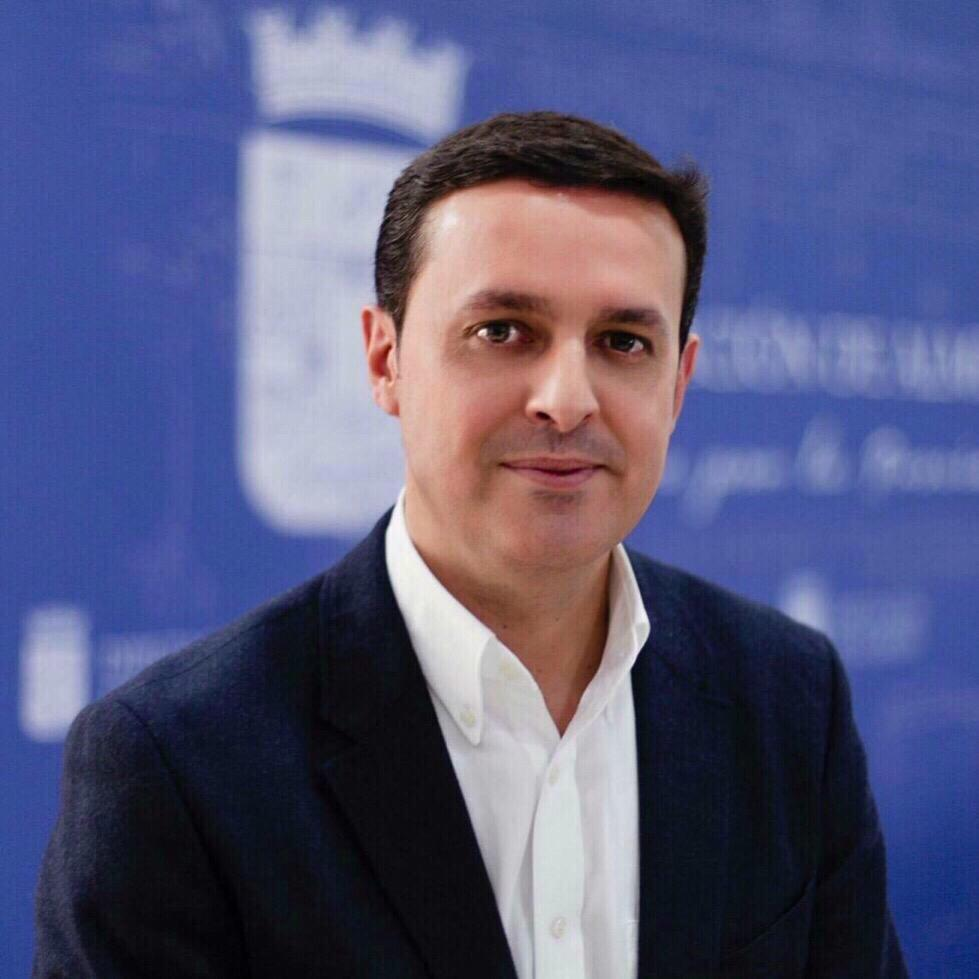
- García in 2019

President of the Provincial Deputation of Almería
- In office 1 January 2019 – 21 November 2025
- Preceded by: Gabriel Amat Ayllón
- Succeeded by: Ángel Escobar Céspedes

Member of the Congress of Deputies
- In office 21 May 2019 – 24 September 2019
- Constituency: Almería

Personal details
- Born: 31 December 1976 (age 49)
- Party: People's Party

Javier Aureliano García Molina (born 31 December 1976) is a Spanish politician who served as president of the Provincial Deputation of Almería from 2019 until his resignation in 2025. From May to September 2019, he was a member of the Congress of Deputies.
