= Lisi Linder =

Spanish actress

- Born: 15 April 1984 (age 41); Cádiz, Andalusia, Spain
- Occupation: Actress

Lisi Linder (born 15 April 1984) is a Spanish actress. She is primarily known for her television work, such as her performances in Mar de plástico and Vis a vis: El oasis.

She is a daughter of Spanish father and Austrian mother.

== Filmography ==
=== Television ===
Year	Title	Role	Notes	Ref.
2013	Gran Hotel	Chica 2		
2015−16	Mar de plástico	Agneska Spassky		
2017	Servir y proteger	Sofiya Volkova		
2018	La víctima número 8	Almudena		
2020	Vis a vis: El oasis	Mónica Ramala		
2023	La Promesa	Elisa de la Vega, baronesa de Grazalema		
2024	4 Estrellas	Elsa		
TBA	Ella, maldita Alma	TBA		

=== Film ===
Year	Title	Role	Notes	Ref.
2014	Historias de Lavapiés	Joana		
2022	Héroes de barrio (Football Heroes of the Block)	Carmen		

== Accolades ==
Year	Award	Category	Work	Result	Ref.
2023	2nd Carmen Awards	Best Actress	Football Heroes of the Block	Nominated	
