= The Gentiles =

- Theatrical release poster
- Spanish: Las gentiles
- Directed by: Santi Amodeo
- Screenplay by: Santi Amodeo
- Produced by: Daniel Pérez Astiárraga; Santi Amodeo
- Starring: África de la Cruz; Paula Díaz; Olga Navalón; Lola Buero; Alva Inger
- Cinematography: Alex Catalán
- Music by: Bronquio; Santi Amodeo
- Production companies: Grupo Tranquilo PC; Sacromonte Films; Las Gentiles Película AIE
- Distributed by: Alfa Pictures
- Release dates: 7 November 2021 (Seville); 3 June 2022 (Spain)
- Country: Spain
- Language: Spanish

The Gentiles (Spanish: Las gentiles) is a 2021 Spanish drama film, directed, written, produced, and scored by Santi Amodeo. It stars África de la Cruz and Paula Díaz alongside Olga Navalón, Lola Buero and Alva Inger.

== Plot ==
Set in Seville, the plot tracks Ana, a teenager and social media enthusiast who feels attracted to Corrales, and which otherwise becomes acquainted with a suicide-related game.

== Cast ==
- África de la Cruz as Ana
- Paula Díaz as Corrales
- Beatriz Cotobal
- Teresa Cruz
- Rafa de Vera
- Olga Navalón
- Lola Buero
- Alva Inger

== Production ==
The film was produced by Grupo Tranquilo PC, Sacromonte Films and Las Gentiles AIE, with the participation of Canal Sur and funding from the Regional Government of Andalusia. Shooting began in February 2021 in Seville. Alex Catalán was responsible for the cinematography. The music was composed by Bronquio and Amodeo himself.

== Release ==
The film was presented at the 18th Seville European Film Festival in November 2021. It also screened at the Tallinn Festival. Distributed by Alfa Pictures, it was theatrically released in Spain on 3 June 2022.

== Reception ==
Paula Arantzazu Ruiz of Cinemanía rated the film 3 out of 5 stars, writing that "encouraged by a suggestive clash between reality and virtuality", the "classic generational conflict" is resolved by Amodeo "with an unexpected and conventional way out" perhaps excessive for the reviewer, summing up as a bottom line: "live fast, die young and leave a beautiful story on Instagram".

Eulàlia Iglesias of Fotogramas also scored the film 3 out of 5 stars, opining that Amodeo "records with enviable naturalness the disorientation of youth in the time of social media", while citing the "excessive" shock value of the final twist as a negative point.

Javier Ocaña of El País considered the film to be "a story of exultant attitude and overwhelming personality in its young female characters".

== Accolades ==
Year	Award	Category	Nominee(s)	Result	Ref.
2023	2nd Carmen Awards	Best Film		Nominated	
2023	2nd Carmen Awards	Best Director	Santi Amodeo	Nominated	
2023	2nd Carmen Awards	Best Original Screenplay	Santi Amodeo	Nominated	
2023	2nd Carmen Awards	Best Supporting Actress	Paula Díaz	Won	
2023	2nd Carmen Awards	Best New Actress	África de la Cruz	Won	
2023	2nd Carmen Awards	Best Editing	José M. G. Moyano, Darío García García	Nominated	
2023	2nd Carmen Awards	Best Art Direction	Ana Medina	Nominated	
2023	2nd Carmen Awards	Best Production Supervision	Esther Diana	Nominated	
2023	2nd Carmen Awards	Best Original Score	Bronquio, Santi Amodeo	Nominated	
2023	2nd Carmen Awards	Best Original Song	"Todo lo que llega un día se va" by Bronquio and Sebastián Orellana	Nominated	
2023	2nd Carmen Awards	Best Makeup and Hairstyles	Carmela Martín, Ana Medina Sánchez	Nominated	
2023	2nd Carmen Awards	Best Sound	Dani de Zayas, Carli Pérez Valero, Jorge Marín	Nominated	
2023	2nd Carmen Awards	Best Special Effects	Amparo Martínez, Laura Domínguez	Nominated	
2023	31st Actors and Actresses Union Awards	Best New Actress	África de la Cruz	Nominated	

== See also ==
- List of Spanish films of 2022
