= Gleich (2023 film) =

- Poster of Gleich movie
- Directed by: Jeniffer Castañeda Garcia
- Written by: Jeniffer Castañeda Garcia
- Produced by: Jeniffer Castañeda Garcia
- Starring: Jose Luis De Madariaga; Sergio Hernandez; Aida Ballmann
- Edited by: Iombi Garcia
- Production company: Nostrana Films
- Release date: 10 November 2023
- Running time: 73 minutes.
- Country: Spain
- Languages: Spanish, German
- Box office: 1014 $

Gleich its a Spanish-German film starring Jose Luis de Madariaga, Aida Ballmann, Sergio Hernandez, Nieves Bravo, and Morad Azzaaoui. It was directed by Jennifer Castañeda and based on her own novel El sendero Bimbache and produced by the company Nostrana Films. The entire crew was from Tenerife, and the movie was shot in Tenerife and El Hierro.

Gleich was released domestically on 10 November 2023 in Tenerife.

== Plot ==
Tell the history of a German Boy who has not spoken since the death of his mother. He spends a summer on the island El Hierro with his father and couple of friends, also German

== Principal Cast ==
- Sergio Hernandez as Kellen
- Aida Ballmann as Ebba
- Jose Luis Madariaga as Manuel
- Nieves Bravo
- Morad Azzoui as Alaric
- Francisco Alexander Almeida as adult Kellen

== Shooting ==
The shooting began 31 July, 2021 in Tenerife and moved to El Hierro on 2 August for at least three weeks.

== Production ==
The movie received funding from local authorities from El Hierro and Tenerife and the support of Valverde and San Cristobal de la laguna Counties. Additionally, local brands as Volkswagen Canarias support the film.

== Critics ==
According to the website De Cine, the movie has an interesting plot but the final result is not enough. FilmAffinity gave it a score of 5.6 out of 10, and praised the performances of Nieves Bravo and Jose Luis De Madariaga, but criticized the plot.

== Home Office ==
According Box Office Mojo, Gleich earned $1,058 in the first week of its release.
