= Victim Number 8 =

2018 Spanish-language television series

- Spanish: La víctima número 8
- Genre: Action; Drama; Thriller
- Created by: Sara Antuña; Marc Cistaré
- Directed by: Alejandro Bazzano
- Starring: César Mateo; María de Nati; Verónika Moral
- Country of origin: Spain
- Original language: Spanish
- No. of seasons: 1
- No. of episodes: 8

Production
- Production companies: EiTB; Telemadrid; Mediapro; Globomedia; K2000

Original release
- Network: ETB 2; Telemadrid
- Release: October 10 – November 28, 2018

Victim Number 8 (Spanish: La víctima número 8) is a Spanish conspiracy thriller television series created by Sara Antuña and Marc Cistaré that originally aired on ETB 2 and Telemadrid from October 10 to November 28, 2018. It stars César Mateo, María de Nati, and Verónika Moral.

== Premise ==
Loosely inspired on the August 2017 Barcelona attacks, the plot revolves around a jihadi attack in the Old Town of Bilbao with seven casualties and several more wounded, and the police investigation trying to catch those responsible for the killing.

== Cast ==
- César Mateo as Omar
- María de Nati as Edurne
- Verónika Moral as Koro
- Iñaki Ardanaz as Gaizka
- Farah Hamed as Adila
- Lisi Linder as Almudena
- Khaled Kouka as Ibrahim
- Óscar Zafra as Gorostiza
- Jesús Ruyman as Comisario
- Alfonso Torregrosa as José María Azkarate
- Itziar Lazkano as Concha
- Son Khoury as Zakir
- Youssef Bougarovaney as Aissa
- Marcial Álvarez as Eche
- Gemma Martínez
- Itziar Aizpuru as María
- Álex Larumbe
- Gilen Xabier as Agente Morera
- Keiko Fayrori

Several EITB and Telemadrid journalists make cameo appearances as themselves.

== Production and release ==
It was co-produced by Mediapro (via its production companies K2000 and Globomedia), ETB and Telemadrid. Alejandro Bazzano was the director of the series.

Victim Number 8 premiered in Spain on October 10, 2018, simultaneously on ETB 2 and Telemadrid. The series was released worldwide on Netflix on August 16, 2019.

== Episodes ==
Season	Episodes	Originally released			Ref.
Season	Episodes	First released	Last released	Network	Ref.
1	8	October 10, 2018	November 28, 2018	ETB 2 & Telemadrid	

No.	Title	Original release date
1	"Omar"	October 10, 2018
2	"Los milagros no existen"	October 17, 2018
3	"Empezar a creer"	October 24, 2018
4	"El tiro de gracia"	October 31, 2018
5	"Una teoría de mierda"	November 7, 2018
6	"Un tiburón que nos haga aún más ricos a todos"	November 14, 2018
7	"El síndrome del nido"	November 21, 2018
8	"Muy fácil o muy difícil"	November 28, 2018

== Reception ==
Victim Number 8 has a rating of 3.5 stars out of 5 on the review website Ready, Steady, Cut. Writing for Ready Steady Cut, Jonathan Wilson commented: “Tense and engrossing, this Spanish thriller offers a well-paced and tightly-written high-stakes story.”
