= Taxi to Gibraltar =

- Theatrical release Poster
- Spanish: Taxi a Gibraltar
- Directed by: Alejo Flah
- Written by: Alejo Flah; Fernando Navarro
- Starring: Dani Rovira; Ingrid García-Jonsson; Joaquín Furriel
- Cinematography: Gris Jordana
- Edited by: Antonio Frutos; Javi Frutos
- Music by: Aránzazu Calleja
- Production companies: La Terraza Films; Atresmedia Cine; Ikiru Films; Sacromonte Films; Código Sur Producciones; La Mano de Dios la Película AIE; Film Tonic; AZ Films
- Distributed by: Warner Bros. Pictures
- Release dates: 15 March 2019 (Spain); 14 November 2019 (Argentina)
- Countries: Spain; Argentina
- Languages: Spanish; English; Spanglish

Taxi to Gibraltar (Spanish: Taxi a Gibraltar) is a 2019 Spanish-Argentine buddy road movie and madcap comedy with adventure elements directed by Alejo Flah, starring Joaquín Furriel, Dani Rovira and Ingrid García-Jonsson.

== Plot ==
Diego (an Argentine con-man), León (a grumpy Spanish taxi driver) and Sandra (a woman dissatisfied with her life), embark on a road trip to Gibraltar set to look out for a gold treasure purportedly hidden in the tunnels below The Rock.

== Cast ==
- Joaquín Furriel as Diego Manfredi
- Dani Rovira as León Lafuente
- Ingrid García-Jonsson as Sandra Sánchez
- Mona Martínez as Justine
- José Manuel Poga as Manchester
- José Troncoso as José Manuel
- Jorge García "Perrichi" as John Pérez
- Juan Vinuesa as Raúl Pérez
- María Hervás as Rosario
- Fernanda Orazi as Alicia

== Production ==
The screenplay was penned by Alejo Flah alongside Fernando Navarro. A Spain–Argentina co-production, the film was produced by La Terraza Films, Atresmedia Cine, Ikiru Films, Sacromonte Films, Código Sur Producciones and La Mano de Dios la Película AIE alongside Film Tonic and AZ Films. It had the participation of Atresmedia, Amazon and Canal Sur, funding from the ICAA, support from ICEC, and the collaboration of INCAA and the Ibermedia programme. It was shot in Madrid, La Línea, and Gran Canaria.

== Release ==
Taxi to Gibraltar screened as the opening film of the 22nd Málaga Spanish Film Festival on 15 March 2019. Distributed by Warner Bros España, it also hit Spanish theatres on the same day. It premiered in Argentina on 14 November 2019.

== Reception ==
Raquel Hernández Luján of HobbyConsolas gave the film 58 out of 100 films (overall assessment: "so-so"), considering that despite the good casting, the very good shooting and resourceful production, the film fails because of the writing. She highlighted the Spanglish-speaking police agents from Gibraltar to be the best thing about the film. She however deemed García-Jonsson's and Rovira's unfunny characters to be a drag, whereas supporting actors José Manuel Poga and Mona Martínez featured too little screentime.

Reviewing for Cinemanía, Rubén Romero Santos scored 2 out of 5 stars, considering that despite a promising initial approach (successfully portraying the losers who cannot see the end of the economic crisis) the film is derailed by the inclusion of a romantic comedy, an episodic story and even an adventure-mystery story as subplots.

Juan Pando of Fotogramas rated the film with 3 out of 5 stars, highlighting Furriel's "touching" caricature of a deceitful Porteño as the best thing about the film.

== See also ==
- List of Spanish films of 2019
- List of Argentine films of 2019
