= Picasso's Gang =

- Poster
- Directed by: Fernando Colomo
- Screenplay by: Fernando Colomo
- Starring: Ignacio Mateos; Pierre Bénézit; Jordi Vilches; Lionel Abelanski; Raphäelle Agogué; Louise Monot
- Cinematography: Jose Luis Alcaine
- Edited by: Maria Lara; Antonio Lara
- Music by: Juan Bardem
- Production company: Colomo P.C.
- Release date: 14 December 2012
- Country: Spain
- Languages: French; Spanish; English

La banda Piccaso is a 2012 Spanish film directed by Fernando Colomo. A thriller film, it centers on Picasso and other real life painters in Paris in the early 1910s, the film being a depiction of real events associated with the 1911 robbery of the Mona Lisa and the fact that the French police suspected the involvement of the Spanish painter.

== Cast ==
- Ignacio Mateos: Pablo Picasso
- Pierre Bénézit: Guillaume Apollinaire
- Jordi Vilches: Manolo Hugué
- Lionel Abelanski: Max Jacob
- Raphäelle Agogué: Fernande Olivier
- Louise Monot: Marie Laurencin
- Alexis Michalik: Géry Pieret (Le Baron)
- Stanley Weber: Georges Braque
- Thomas Jouannet: Henri-Pierre Roché
- Cristina Toma: Gertrude Stein
- David Coburn: Leo Stein
- Eszter Tompa: Alice B.Toklas

== Reception ==
A critic from Fotogramas rated the film three out of five stars. A critic from Variety called the film ”a lively period piece about a footnote in the titular artist's life”.

== Accolades ==
Nominated at the XXVII edición de los Premios Goya in two categories.

== See also ==
Two other films about the 1911 theft of the Mona Lisa:

- The Theft of the Mona Lisa
- The Mona Lisa Has Been Stolen
