= Antonio Gil =

Spanish actor

- Born: Antonio Gil Martínez; 1965 (age 60–61); Barcarrota, Spain
- Occupation: Actor
- Years active: 1996–present

Antonio Gil Martínez (born 1965) is a Spanish actor. Gil has appeared in a number of international movies, including Chocolat (2000), The Merchant of Venice, Quantum of Solace (2008), and most notable Risen (2016) playing the role of Joseph of Arimathea. On television, Gil acted on both British and Spanish series, include Pulsaciones, La peste and Malaka. In 2019, he starred as Oleg Yasikov in the second season of Telemundo/Netflix crime series La Reina del Sur opposite Kate del Castillo, replacing Alberto Jiménez in this role.

== Filmography ==
=== Film ===
- The Man with Rain in His Shoes (1998)
- Chocolat (2000)
- The Merchant of Venice (2004)
- Daylight Robbery (2008)
- Quantum of Solace (2008)
- Chicas (2010)
- The Way (2010)
- La mula (2013)
- Pos eso (2014)
- Risen (2016)
- La corona partida (2016)
- Thi Mai, rumbo a Vietnam (2017)
- The Man Who Killed Don Quixote (2018)
- Journey to Bethlehem (2023)

=== Television ===
- Soldier Soldier (1 episode, 1996)
- Don Quixote (2000)
- Dirty Tricks (2000)
- Hornblower: Retribution (2001)
- Doctors (1 episode, 2004)
- Mujeres (13 episodes, 2006)
- Plutón BRB Nero (26 episodes, 2008–09)
- El Gordo: una historia verdadera (2010)
- Hispania, la leyenda (17 episodes, 2010–11)
- Cuéntame un cuento (1 episode, 2013)
- Benidorm (1 episode, 2014)
- Pulsaciones (10 episodes, 2016–17)
- La peste (6 episodes, 2018)
- La Reina del Sur (46 episodes, 2019)
- Malaka (8 episodes, 2019)
- The Mallorca Files (1 episode, 2019)
- Alba (13 episodes, 2021)
- La Reina del Sur, temporada 3 (60 episodes, 2022)
