= Malaka (TV series) =

- Official poster
- Genre: Police crime drama Thriller
- Created by: Daniel Corpas Hansen; Samuel Pinazo
- Directed by: Marc Vigil; Carles Torrens; Chiqui Carabante
- Starring: Maggie Civantos; Salva Reina; Vicente Romero; Cuca Escribano; Susana Córdoba
- Country of origin: Spain
- Original language: Spanish
- No. of seasons: 1
- No. of episodes: 8

Production
- Executive producers: Daniel Corpas Hansen; Javier Pons; Javier Olivares; Marc Vigil; Javier García Díaz
- Production location: Málaga
- Cinematography: Manuel Aguado; Curro Ferreira; David Tudela
- Editors: Laura Montesinos; Josu Martínez; Silvia Pizarro
- Running time: 60 min
- Production company: Globomedia

Original release
- Network: La 1
- Release: September 9 – October 21, 2019

Malaka is a Spanish thriller television series created by Daniel Corpas Hansen and Samuel Pinazo, produced by Globomedia and Javier Olivares, and starring Maggie Civantos, Salva Reina and Vicente Romero. It is directed by Marc Vigil. It premiered on La 1 on 9 September 2019.

== Premise ==
Set in Málaga, the fiction starts with the disappearance of Noelia Castañeda (Helena Kaittani). Two police officers—Blanca Gámez (Maggie Civantos) and Darío Arjona (Salva Reina)—are charged with the case.

== Cast ==
- Maggie Civantos as Blanca Gámez
- Salva Reina as Darío Arjona "Gato"
- Vicente Romero as Joaquín "Quino" Romero
- Alejandro Casaseca as Felipe Monzón
- Antonio Gil as Germán Castañeda
- Manuel Morón as Esteban Sarabia
- Víctor Castilla as Vicente Cortés "El Suizo"
- Emilio Palacios as Álvaro
- Ignacio Mateos as Israel Cruz "El Barra"
- Laura Baena Torres as Asunción Cortés "La Tota"
- Héctor Medina as Jesús Pacheco "El Malo"
- Susana Córdoba as Salomé
- Pilar Gómez as Nines
- Noemí Ruiz as Ruth Bravo
- Helena Kaittani as Noelia Castañeda
- Cuca Escribano as Olga de la Cova
- Marco Cerezo as Perico

== Production and release ==
Malaka was shot between April and July 2019 in Málaga, Andalusia.

In advance of its television premiere, two episodes of the series received a preview screening at the 2019 FesTVal on 2 September 2019. The series premiered on La 1 on 9 September 2019, with 2 back-to-back episodes.

Series	Episodes	Originally released			Viewers	Share (%)	Ref.
Series	Episodes	First released	Last released	Network	Viewers	Share (%)	Ref.
1	8	9 September 2019	21 October 2019	tve	1,360,000	9.6	

This is a caption
No. in season	Title	Viewers	Original release date	Share (%)
1	"Fenicios"	1,874,000	9 September 2019	13.5
2	"Vivir dentro de una piedra"	1,523,000	9 September 2019	15.6
3	"Tú no sabes quién soy yo"	1,341,000	16 September 2019	9.0
4	"La palabra es plata, el silencio es oro"	1,150,000	23 September 2019	8.0
5	"El secreto de Kali"	1,269,000	30 September 2019	8.5
6	"Alquimia"	1,233,000	7 October 2019	8.4
7	"Mañana todo aquí será como ayer"	1,246,000	14 October 2019	8.3
8	"Y yo cobro"	1,173,000	21 October 2019	7.5

== Awards and nominations ==
Year	Award	Category	Nominee(s)	Result	Ref.
2019	7th MiM Series Awards	Best Drama Series		Nominated	
2019	7th MiM Series Awards	Best Screenplay	Daniel Corpas, Samuel Pinazo, Jordi Calfí, Sergio Sarriá, Santiago Díaz, Luis Miguel Pérez and Isabel Sánchez	Nominated	
2019	7th MiM Series Awards	Best Drama Actor	Salva Reina	Won	
