= The Extraordinary Tale of the Times Table =

- Principal poster of the movie The Extraordinare Tale
- Directed by: Laura Alvea; José F. Ortuño
- Screenplay by: José F. Ortuño
- Starring: Aïda Ballmann; Ken Appledorn; Jane Arnold; Mari Paz Sayago
- Cinematography: Fran Fernández-Pardo
- Edited by: Carlos Crespo Arnold
- Music by: Héctor Pérez
- Production company: Acheron Films
- Distributed by: Acheron Films
- Release dates: 28 September 2013 (London); 25 July 2014 (Spain)
- Country: Spain
- Language: English

The Extraordinary Tale of the Times Table, or simply The Extraordinary Tale, is a 2013 English-language Spanish black comedy film with magic realism elements directed by Laura Alvea and José F. Ortuño which stars Aïda Ballmann and Ken Appledorn.

== Plot ==
The plot takes the form of a dark fairytale. After sending hundreds of letters to strangers, lonely 'She' (with an obsessive–compulsive disorder behavioural pattern) is answered back by 'He'. After they meet up, they start to live together and she gets pregnant.

== Cast ==
- Aïda Ballmann as She
- Ken Appledorn as He
- Jane Arnold
- Mari Paz Sayago as the Mother

== Production ==
The screenplay was penned by José F. Ortuño. The film was billed its helmers as "a macabre fairytale about relationships". It is an Acheron Films production, produced in association with Áralan Films, with participation of Canal Sur Televisión, and the collaboration of Puraenvidia Films. It was shot in English in barely two weeks. Fran Fernández-Pardo handled the cinematography whereas Carlos Crespo Arnold took over film editing. The score was entrusted to Héctor Pérez.

== Release ==
Selected for the London Spanish Film Festival, the film had its international premiere on 28 September 2013. The film's US rights were picked by MouseTrap for a US theatrical premiere predating the Spanish one. Eventually self-distributed by Acheron Films, it was theatrically released in Spain on 25 July 2014.

== Reception ==
Jonathan Holland of The Hollywood Reporter underscored how, whether if loved or hated, "there's little chance that this quirky tale's black whimsy will leave anyone indifferent".

Javier Ocaña of El País wondered if the "controversial, wild" and otherwise "simply immoral" ending may perhaps explain the reluctance of distributors to release the film in theatres.

Nuria Vidal of Fotogramas rated the film 4 out of 5 stars, considering that the "atypical" film (otherwise shining specially in art direction, costumes and photography); with a "strange script and even stranger dialogues" is not one of those films that you would recommend to everyone; "but it is one of those films that you would recommend" to people tired of always watching the same old stories told the same old way.

J. Batlle of La Vanguardia deemed the film to be a "collector's item", otherwise observing that following a first half hour with a "candid" tone, the film "becomes a suffocating fable of pseudo-Polanskian atmosphere", "cruel to the point of paroxysm".

== Accolades ==
Year	Award	Category	Nominee(s)	Result	Ref.
2014	17th Málaga Film Festival	Silver Biznaga for Audience Award (Zonazine selection)		Won	

== See also ==
- List of Spanish films of 2014
