= Mona Martínez =

Spanish actress

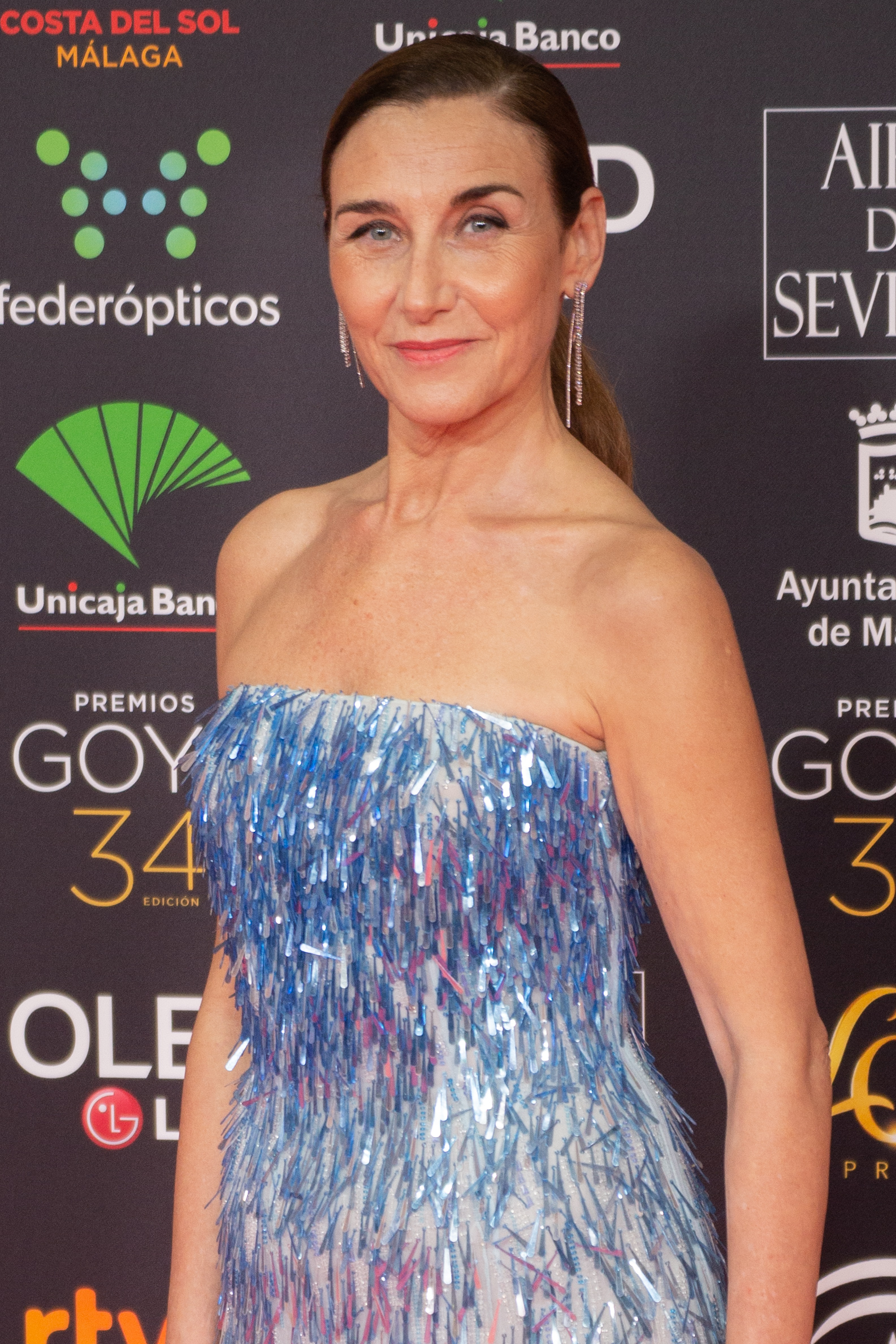
- Martínez in 2020
- Born: 1968 (age 57–58); Málaga, Spain
- Occupations: Actress; dancer

Mónica Martínez (born 16 April 1968), better known as Mona Martínez, is a Spanish film and theatre actress from Andalusia.

== Life and career ==
Born in Málaga in 1968, Martínez is the youngest of nine siblings from a family of the neighborhood of La Luz. Martínez started her career as a ballet dancer at the age of 10.

She moved to Madrid to train her voice acting skills, but continued performing as a flamenco dancer across Spain.

In 2002, she made her screen debut as an actress in the miniseries Padre coraje directed by Benito Zambrano. There was no looking back since then. She starred in movies and television shows like South from Granada, Ana by Day, The Realm, Taxi to Gibraltar, and Bye, for which she was nominated for a Goya Award for Best Supporting Actress. Her television series includes Locked Up, Anclados, Vota Juan and Paquita Salas.

== Filmography ==
=== Films ===
Year	Title	Role	Notes	Ref.
2003	Al sur de Granada	Madre niño dormido		
2005	Camarón (Camarón: When Flamenco Became Legend)			
2018	Ana de día (Ana by Day)	Sole		
2018	El reino (The Realm)	Jueza Costa		
2019	Adiós (Bye)	María		
2019	Terminator: Destino Oscuro	Vendedora Calle		
2019	Intemperie (Out in the Open)	Mujer Entrada Cueva		
2019	Taxi a Gibraltar (Taxi to Gibraltar)	Justine Faithfull		
2022	La maniobra de la tortuga (Unfinished Affairs)	Morgado		
2022	Las niñas de cristal (Dancing on Glass)	Norma		
2022	Jaula (The Chalk Line)	Arana		
2025	La deuda (The Redemption)	Sorina		
2025	Hamburgo (Hamburg)	Tere		
2026	Narciso	Nenucha		
2026	La bola negra	La anciana / la nieve ('the old woman / the snow')		

=== Short films ===
Year	Film title	Director	Role
2018	La guarida	Iago de Soto	Antonia
2018	Block 24	Fernando Pozo	Alba

=== Television series ===
Year	Series Title	Channel	Role	Episodies
2002	Padre coraje	Antena 3	Rosi	3 episodes
2002	Periodistas	Telecinema		1 episode
2002 - 2007	El comisario	Telecinema	Varios personajes	4 episodes
2003	Javier ya no vive solo	Telecinema		1 episode
2003	Despacito y al compás	TV3		TV-Movie
2006	Hospital Central	Telecinco	Julia	1 episode
2008	El síndrome de Ulises	Antena 3		1 episode
2009	La chica de ayer	Antena 3		1 episodime
2009	Paquirri	Telecinco		2 episodes
2009	Un golpe de suerte	Telecinco	Bárbara	31 episodes
2010 - 2011	La duquesa	Telecinco	Carmen	4 episodes
2011	Hispania, la leyenda	Antena 3	Curandera	2 episodes
2013	Isabel	La 1	Sirviente de Aixa	1 episode
2014	Cuéntame cómo pasó	La 1	Reme	2 episodes
2015	Anclados	Telecinco	Madre de Raimundo	2 episodes
2015	Teresa	La 1	La Religiosa de Lisboa	TV-Movie
2016	Vis a vis	Antena 3	Carlota	10 episodes
2018	Paquita Salas	Netflix	Script	1 episode
2019	Vota Juan	TNT España	Simona	3 episodes
2020	Valeria	Netflix	Jefa de Carmen	3 episodes
2020	Veneno	Atresplayer Premium	Mari Carmen Ortiz	2 episodes
2020	Antidisturbios	Movistar+	Leire Costa	3 episodes
2021	Deudas	Atresplayer Premium	Consuelo de la Vega	¿? episodes

== Theatre works ==
Year	Title	Director	Company
2019	Las Bárbaras	Carol López	
2019	Óscar o la felicidad de existir by Éric- Emmanuel Schmitt	Juan Carlos Pérez de la Fuente	
2019	Mi película italiana by Rocío Bello	Salvador Bolta	
2019	Un roble by Tim Crounch	Carlos Tuñón	
2018	Alguien voló sobre el nido del cuco	Jaroslaw Bielski	
2018	La familia no	Gon Ramos	
2017	La Pilarcita	Chema Tena	
2016	Dios K	Víctor Velasco	
2014	Rinoceronte	Ernesto Caballero	
2014	Boomerang	Ernesto Caballero	
2014	Montenegro	Ernesto Caballero	
2014	Ensayando a Don Juan	Albert Boadella	
2014	La dama duende de Pedro Calderón de la Barca	Miguel Narros	
2013	Yerma de Federico García Lorca	Miguel Narros	
2011	¡Ay, Carmela! by José Sánchez Sinisterra	José Luis Arellano	
2011	Mi alma en otra parte de Manuel Mora	Xicu Masó	
2011	Avaricia, lujuria y muerte	Salvador Bolta	
2010	La duquesa al hoyo y la viuda al bollo		La Pica de Flandes
2008	Alicia atraviesa el Espejo	Jaroslaw Bielski	Réplika Teatro
2008	Cervantes Circus	José Luis Sáiz	Nómadas Club
2007	Comedias cómicas en el corral de comedias	José Luis Sáiz	
2004	Alicia	Jaroslaw Bielski	Réplika Teatro
2003	Cartas cruzadas	José Luis Sáiz	Réplika Teatro

== Accolades ==
Martínez receiving a 'Málaga Cinema' Biznaga at the 23rd Málaga Film Festival.

Year	Award	Category	Work	Result	Ref.
2020	7th Feroz Awards	Best Supporting Actress in a Film	Bye	Nominated	
2020	34th Goya Awards	Best Supporting Actress	Bye	Nominated	
2020	29th Actors and Actresses Union Awards	Best Film Actress in a Minor Role	Bye	Nominated	
