= Ignacio Mateos =

Spanish actor

- Occupation: Actor
- Years active: 2003–present
- Known for: La banda Picasso (2013)

Ignacio Mateos is a Spanish actor from Málaga, known for his roles in the films La banda Picasso (2012) and La maniobra de la tortuga (2022).

== Career ==
While in college, Ignacio Mateos joined the acting school Escuela Alicia Hermida in Madrid and participated in numerous stage plays. In 2003, he appeared in the television series Arrayán before appearing in Hospital Central and El comisario.

His first starring role was in La banda Picasso (2013) in which he portrayed Picasso. His performance in Unbridled (2018) was well received by critics.

== Selected filmography ==
List of films and roles
Year	Title	Role	Notes	Ref.
2006	Alatriste	Fabio		
2012	Blancanieves	Photographer	Cameo appearance	
2012	La banda Picasso	Picasso		
2013	La Mula	Jesús		
2015	Lejos del mar	Emilio		
2018	Animales sin collar	Victor		
2022	La maniobra de la tortuga			
2024	Azken erromantikoak	Miguel María		
2024	Barroz 3D	Cristóvão da Gama	Indian film	

=== Television ===
List of television series and roles
Year	Title	Role	Network	Notes	Ref.
2008	El comisario	Drug dealer	Telecinco	1 episode	
2021	The Vineyard	Luis el Comino	Amazon Prime Video		
2024	Las abogadas	Pedro Patiño	La 1		

== Awards ==
Year	Award	Category	Work	Result	Ref.
2019	6th Feroz Awards	Best Supporting Actor	Animales sin collar	Nominated	
