= Pulsaciones =

Spanish television series

- Also known as: Lifeline
- Genre: Psychological thriller Drama; Supernatural drama
- Created by: Emilio Aragón; Carmen O. Carbonero; Francisco Roncal
- Written by: Emilio Aragón; Carmen O. Carbonero; Francisco Roncal
- Directed by: Emilio Aragón; David Ulloa; David Victori
- Starring: Pablo Derqui; Leonor Watling; Meritxell Calvo; Ingrid Rubio; Juan Diego Botto
- Opening theme: "Le regalaba el corazón" by Sílvia Pérez Cruz
- Country of origin: Spain
- Original language: Spanish
- No. of seasons: 1
- No. of episodes: 10

Production
- Editors: Raúl Mora; Roberto Serrano; Ricardo Marchán
- Production company: Globomedia

Original release
- Network: Antena 3
- Release: January 10 – March 14, 2017

Pulsaciones (literally Pulsations, title in English Lifeline) is a Spanish thriller series produced by Globomedia for Antena 3. It premiered on January 10 and ended on March 14, 2017, and was a one-season, 10-episode series with a closed ending. The series was selected by consulting agency The WIT among the most remarkable international shows in the 2016 MIPTV Media Market.

== Plot ==
Álex (Pablo Derqui) is a neurosurgeon who has received a heart transplant. His donor is an investigative journalist named Rodrigo (Juan Diego Botto) whose death is shrouded in mystery. Shortly after the operation, Álex starts seeing Rodrigo's memories in the form of nightmares, which will lead to him trying to uncover the causes of his death. He will be joined in this by Lara Valle (Meritxell Calvo), an aspiring young journalist who was mentored by Rodrigo.

== Cast ==
- Pablo Derqui as Álex Puga
- Leonor Watling as Blanca Jiménez
- Ingrid Rubio as Marián Gala
- Meritxell Calvo as Lara Valle
- Juan Diego Botto as Rodrigo Ugarte
- Antonio Gil as Santiago Ariza
- Alberto Berzal as Héctor
- Carolina Lapausa as Olga
- Fernando Sansegundo as Lorenzo Meyer
- Javier Lara as Carlos Meyer
- Manel Dueso as César
- Nacho Marraco as Guzmán
- José Pedro Carrión as Gabriel Escudero
- Ana Marzoa as Gloria
- Cristina Marcos as Amalia Sigüenza
- María Mercado as Mónica

== List of episodes ==
No. overall	No. in season	Title	Directed by	Original release date	Mill. of viewers (Share)
1	1	"La memoria del corazón"	Emilio Aragón	January 10, 2017	3.011 (17.1%)
2	2	"No estoy loco"	David Ulloa	January 17, 2017	2.515 (14.7%)
3	3	"El enemigo interior"	David Victori	January 24, 2017	2.232 (13.9%)
4	4	"BN23"	Emilio Aragón	January 31, 2017	2.216 (13.1%)
5	5	"Mantenerse a flote"	David Ulloa	February 7, 2017	1.913 (11.9%)
6	6	"Entrando en el laboratorio"	David Victori	February 14, 2017	1.900 (12.1%)
7	7	"Verdades descubiertas"	Emilio Aragón	February 21, 2017	1.886 (11.7%)
8	8	"En búsqueda"	David Victori	February 28, 2017	1.824 (11.5%)
9	9	"Comienza la cuenta atrás"	David Ulloa & Emilio Aragón	March 7, 2017	2.010 (12.5%)
10	10	"Álex decide cambiar su vida"	David Ulloa & Emilio Aragón	March 14, 2017	1.816 (11.4%)

== International broadcast ==
The series has been picked up by Channel 4-backed video on demand service Walter Presents for the United States and the United Kingdom. Netflix has acquired its rights for Latin America as well.
