= Unfinished Affairs =

- Theatrical release poster
- Spanish: La maniobra de la tortuga
- Directed by: Juan Miguel del Castillo
- Screenplay by: Juan Miguel del Castillo; José Rodríguez
- Based on: La maniobra de la tortuga by Benito Olmo
- Starring: Fred Adenis; Natalia de Molina; Ignacio Mateos; Mona Martínez; Carlos Manuel Díaz; Gerardo de Pablos
- Production companies: Áralan Films; A Contracorriente Films; La maniobra de la tortuga AIE; Aleph Media
- Distributed by: A Contracorriente Films (es)
- Release dates: 24 March 2022 (Málaga); 13 May 2022 (Spain)
- Countries: Spain; Argentina
- Language: Spanish

Unfinished Affairs (Spanish: La maniobra de la tortuga) is a 2022 Spanish-Argentine neo-noir police thriller film directed by Juan Miguel del Castillo which stars Fred Adenis and Natalia de Molina. It is an adaptation of the novel La maniobra de la tortuga by Benito Olmo.

== Plot ==
After police inspector Manuel Bianquetti is transferred from Madrid to Cádiz, he gets involved in the investigation of a criminal case around the corpse of a young woman.

== Cast ==
- Fred Adenis as Manuel Bianquetti
- Natalia de Molina
- Ignacio Mateos
- Mona Martínez
- Carlos Manuel Díaz
- Gerardo de Pablos

== Production ==
An adaptation of the novel La maniobra de la tortuga by Benito Olmo, the screenplay was penned by Juan Miguel del Castillo alongside José Rodríguez. The film was produced by Áralan Films, A Contracorriente Films and La maniobra de la tortuga AIE alongside Aleph Media and it had the participation of RTVE, Canal Sur and Movistar+. It was funded by ICAA, AAIICC, Triodos Bank and Crea SGR and sponsored by the Diputación de Cádiz. Shooting began in May 2021 and wrapped in June 2021. Shooting locations included the province of Cádiz (Jerez de la Frontera, San Fernando, Cádiz) and Seville.

== Release ==
The film had its world premiere on 24 March 2022 at the 25th Málaga Film Festival, screened in the festival's main competition. Distributed by A Contracorriente Films, it was theatrically released in Spain on 13 May 2022. Latido Films swooped on international sales rights.

== Reception ==
Sergio F. Pinilla of Cinemanía rated the film 4½ out of 5 stars deeming the film to be the "best [Spanish] police thriller since Marshland (despite its ending)", also writing that "it is a fierce, intense thriller that also knows how to take advantage of the chromatic and scenic richness of the Tacita de Plata".

Beatriz Martínez of El Periódico de Catalunya scored 2 out of 5 stars, considering that the result of interweaving the codes of the investigative thriller with elements of social realism "is not always satisfactory", bringing in issues of lack of subtlety and certain clumsy storytelling.

Reviewing for El Cultural, Juan Sardá wrote that Juan Miguel del Castillo "without departing from the codes of the thriller, manages to extract moments of true humanity", likewise assessing that the "excellent direction manages to create a turbulent, unhealthy atmosphere", to which the great performances by Molina and Tatien add up.

Ekaitz Ortega of HobbyConsolas scored 64 out of 100 points ("acceptable"), highlighting the performances from the two leads and the use of the setting as an additional character among the best things about the film, while citing as a negative point that the two subplots fit together in a "somewhat forced way" and the social message, particularly the ending, is too unpolished.

Elsa Fernández Santos of El País considered Unfinished Affairs to be irregular (yet also timely), assessing that the film grows as it progresses, that could have blended both stories better and that Natalia de Molina "once again demonstrates her enormous acting talent".

== Accolades ==
Year	Award	Category	Nominee(s)	Result	Ref.
2023	2nd Carmen Awards	Best Film		Nominated	
2023	2nd Carmen Awards	Best Director	Juan Miguel del Castillo	Nominated	
2023	2nd Carmen Awards	Best Actress	Natalia de Molina	Won	
2023	2nd Carmen Awards	Best Adapted Screenplay	Juan Miguel del Castillo, José Rodríguez	Nominated	
2023	2nd Carmen Awards	Best Supporting Actress	Mona Martínez	Nominated	
2023	2nd Carmen Awards	Best New Actor	Fran Caballero	Nominated	
2023	2nd Carmen Awards	Best Editing	Manuel Terceño	Nominated	
2023	2nd Carmen Awards	Best Art Direction	Vanesa de la Haza	Nominated	
2023	2nd Carmen Awards	Best Production Supervision	Sandra Rodríguez, Marta Velasco	Nominated	
2023	2nd Carmen Awards	Best Makeup and Hairstyles	Ana Beato, Rafael Mora	Nominated	
2023	2nd Carmen Awards	Best Sound	Dani de Zayas, Jorge Marín	Nominated	
2023	2nd Carmen Awards	Best Special Effects	Amparo Martínez	Nominated	

== See also ==
- List of Spanish films of 2022
