= Summer Days (film) =

- Theatrical release poster
- Spanish: Días de agosto
- Directed by: Chema de la Peña
- Written by: David Sueiro
- Produced by: Silvia Carvalho
- Starring: Maggie Civantos; Roberto Álamo; Pau Simon; Berta Galo; Isaac Dos Santos; Pilar Castro
- Cinematography: Dani Salo
- Edited by: Cristina Laguna
- Music by: Joan Valent
- Production companies: Días de agosto; Inefable Productions
- Distributed by: Deep Com Roots
- Release date: 14 August 2026
- Running time: 96 minutes
- Country: Spain
- Language: Spanish

Summer Days (Spanish: Días de agosto) is a 2026 Spanish erotic romantic drama film directed by Chema de la Peña and written by David Sueiro. It stars Maggie Civantos, Roberto Álamo, Pau Simon, and Berta Galo.

== Plot ==
College student Juan takes a summer vacation with his girlfriend Gabriela to the family beach cottage, but upon the unexpected arrival of his father Fernando and his new girlfriend Mónica, Juan and Mónica develop feelings for each other while the tense father-son relationship disrupts the family harmony.

== Cast ==
- Maggie Civantos as Mónica
- Roberto Álamo as Fernando
- Pau Simon as Juan
- Berta Galo as Gabriela
- Isaac Dos Santos
- Pilar Castro

== Production ==
The film was produced by Inefable Productions (ISII Group). Shooting locations in Gran Canaria included Mogán and a house in Santa Brígida.

== Release ==
Distributed by Deep Com Roots, Summer Days was released theatrically in Spain on 14 August 2026. International deals were closed for the markets of Brazil (Sofa Digital), Germany, Austria and Switzerland (Busch Media Group), and the CIS countries (Kinologistika).

== Reception ==
Juan Pando of Fotogramas rated the film 3 out of 5 stars, pointing out that "among the well-matched cast, the young Berta Galo shines in her own right".

Raquel Hernández Luján of HobbyConsolas gave the film a 50-point score, lamenting that the "elegant" film "gives the impression of having little to say beyond a family drama that simmers slowly and seems to go nowhere".

Enid Román Almansa of Cinemanía rated the film 3 out of 5 stars, billing the film as "a suspenseful family drama" and otherwise welcoming that, vis-à-vis the erotic elements, "it does not resort to sex for sex's sake".

== See also ==
- List of Spanish films of 2026
