= From Good to the Hood =

- Theatrical release poster
- Spanish: Al otro barrio
- Directed by: Mar Olid
- Written by: Daniel Monedero; Francisco Arnal
- Based on: Jusqu'ici tout va bien by Khaled Amara, Mohamed Hamidi, and Michaël Souhaité
- Produced by: Ghislain Barrois; Álvaro Augustin; Antonio Asensio; Paloma Molina
- Starring: Quim Gutiérrez; Sara Sálamo; María de Nati; Javi Herrera; Hamza Zaidi; Jorge Suquet; Yael Belicha; Elena Ballesteros; Fernando Valdivielso; Carlos Librado "Nene"; Francesc Orella
- Cinematography: Sergi Gallardo
- Edited by: Ángel Hernández Zoido
- Music by: Vanessa Garde
- Production companies: Telecinco Cinema; Zeta Cinema
- Distributed by: Buena Vista International
- Release dates: 15 November 2024 (Seville); 5 December 2024 (Spain)
- Country: Spain
- Language: Spanish

From Good to the Hood (Spanish: Al otro barrio) is a 2024 Spanish comedy film directed by Mar Olid (in her debut feature) and written by Daniel Monedero and Francisco Arnal based on the French film Jusqu'ici tout va bien. The cast is led by Quim Gutiérrez, Sara Sálamo, María de Nati, Hamza Zaidi, and Javier Herrera.

== Plot ==
After cheating the tax office and being found out, slimy businessman Andrés is forced to relocate his company (a high-profile communications agency) and the workers from the centre of Madrid to a marginal suburb of the city known as Los Caños.

== Cast ==
- Quim Gutiérrez as Andrés
- Sara Sálamo as Sara
- María de Nati
- Javier Herrera
- Hamza Zaidi
- Jorge Suquet
- Yael Belicha
- Fernando Valdivielso
- Carmen Ruiz
- Elena Ballesteros
- Francesc Orella

== Production ==
The film is a remake of the French film Jusqu'ici tout va bien written by Khaled Amara, Mohamed Hamidi, and Michaël Souhaité. It was produced by Telecinco Cinema and Zeta Cinema and it had the participation of Mediaset España, Movistar Plus+, and Mediterráneo Mediaset España Group and the backing from ICAA. Shooting locations included Madrid.

== Release ==
The film was selected for a special screening at the 21st Seville European Film Festival. Distributed by Buena Vista International, it is scheduled to be released theatrically in Spain on 5 December 2024.

== See also ==
- List of Spanish films of 2024
