= Deudas =

Spanish television series

- Genre: Comedy
- Created by: Daniel Écija
- Starring: Carmen Maura; Pedro A. Roca; Carmen Ruiz; Salva Reina; Ibrahim Al Shami; María de Nati; Fede Rey; Javi Coll; Michael J. Trenor; Mona Martínez
- Country of origin: Spain
- Original language: Spanish
- No. of seasons: 1
- No. of episodes: 13

Production
- Running time: c. 50 minutes
- Production companies: Atresmedia TV; Good Mood

Original release
- Network: Atresplayer Premium
- Release: 24 January – 18 April 2021

Deudas is a Spanish comedy television series created by Daniel Écija that originally aired on Atresplayer Premium from 24 January to 18 April 2021. The cast features Carmen Maura, Mona Martínez, Carmen Ruiz and Salva Reina, among others.

== Premise ==
The plot concerns the histrionic rivalry between two families, respectively led by Pepa Carranza and Doña Consuelo de la Vega.

== Cast ==
- Carmen Maura as Pepa Carranza.
- Mona Martínez as Doña Consuelo.
- Carmen Ruiz es Lucía.
- Pedro Ángel Roca as Iván.
- Ibrahim Al Shami as Javi.
- María de Nati as Sara.
- Salva Reina as Raúl.
- Verónica Schultz as Valeria.
- Javi Coll as Esteban.
- Michael J. Treanor as Andrei.
- Fede Rey as Jacobo.
- Carmen Canivell as Rocío.
- Miguel Ángel Martín as Jimmy.
- Cristina Peña as Julieta.

== Production ==
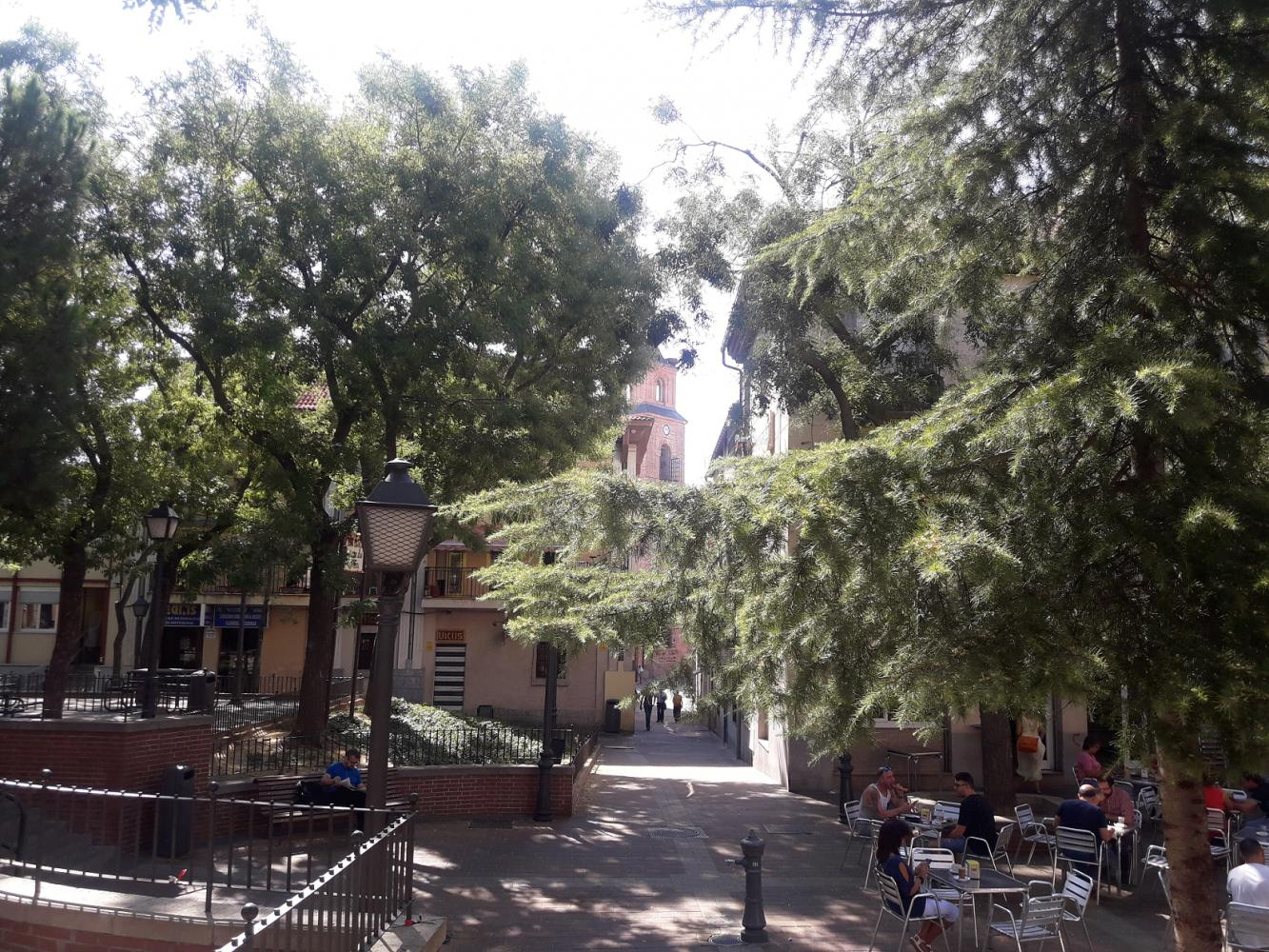
Footage was shot in the Plaza de Don Antonio Andrés, in Vicálvaro.

Created by Daniel Écija, Deudas was produced by Atresmedia Televisión in collaboration with Good Mood. Jesús Mesas Silva, Sara Cano, Jorge Valdano Sáenz and Javier Andrés Roig joined Écija as part of the writing team. Direction duties were tasked to Oriol Ferrer, David Molina, Luis Oliveros, Pol Rodríguez and Patricia Font. Montse García and Daniel Écija were credited as executive producers.

Atresmedia greenlighted the project in June 2020. Shooting lasted from July to October 2020. It took place in Madrid and in the set of Infinia Studios in Boadilla del Monte. The district of Vicálvaro was a prime shooting location, with production extensively working around the Plaza de Don Antonio de Andrés.

== Release ==
The series premiered on Atresplayer Premium on 24 January 2021. Consisting of 13 episodes featuring a running time of around 50 minutes, the weekly broadcasting run ended on 18 April 2021.
