= Eterna (film) =

- Film poster
- Directed by: Juanma Sayalonga; David Sainz
- Screenplay by: Juanma Sayalonga; David Sainz
- Cinematography: Paloma Roussanova
- Edited by: Javi Lería
- Music by: Gata Cattana
- Production companies: Diffferent Entertainment; VivaTodo Films; Cinnamon Factory
- Distributed by: 39 Escalones
- Release dates: 7 November 2022 (Seville); 2 March 2023 (Spain)
- Country: Spain
- Language: Spanish

Eterna is a 2022 Spanish documentary film directed by Juanma Sayalonga and David Sainz about the life of feminist rapper-poet Gata Cattana.

== Plot ==
The documentary concerns about the depiction of key points of the life of Ana Isabel García Llorente (aka Gata Cattana; aka Ana Sforza), with interventions by the likes of Juancho Marqués, Alejandra Martínez de Miguel, Sara Socas, Frank T and Mala Rodríguez.

== Production ==
A Diffferent Entertainment, VivaTodo Films, and Cinnamon Factory production, the project began development soon after the death of Ana Isabel García Llorente in 2017. It received funding via crowdfunding.

== Release ==
The film premiered at Teatro Lope de Vega within the Seville European Film Festival's 'Panorama Andaluz' film slate on 7 November 2022. It also screened at the Huelva Ibero-American Film Festival. Distributed by 39 Escalones, it was released theatrically in Spain on 2 March 2023.

== Accolades ==
Year	Award	Category	Nominee(s)	Result	Ref.
2023	2nd Carmen Awards	Best New Director	Juanma Sayalonga, David Sainz	Nominated	

== See also ==
- List of Spanish films of 2023
