= Telecinema =

Festival of Britain building by Wells Coates

Coordinates: 51°30′19″N 0°6′55″W

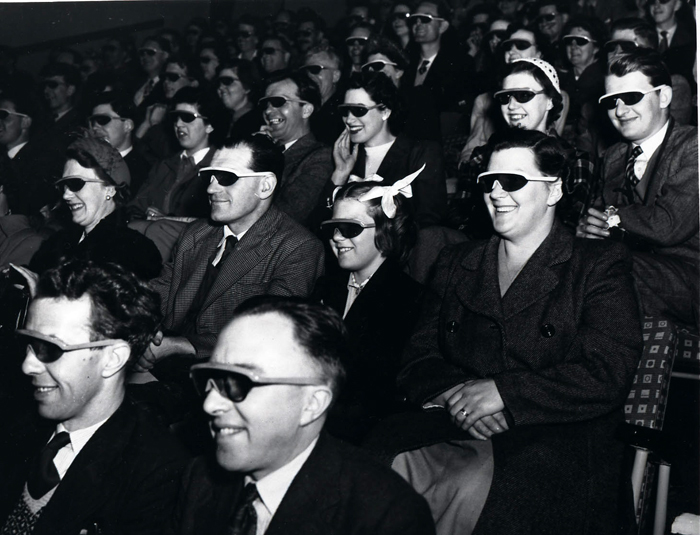
An audience wearing special glasses watch a 3D "stereoscopic film" at the Telecinema

The Telecinema was a small cinema built especially for the Festival of Britain's London South Bank Exhibition in the summer of 1951. It was situated between Waterloo station and the Royal Festival Hall.

The Telecinema was one of the most popular attractions of the Festival, with 458,693 visitors. Many people had to be turned away. When the Festival of Britain ended, the press and public called for its retention, and, following discussion with the London County Council and the film industry, "the building was formally handed over to the BFI for use as a members-only repertory cinema club. It was re-equipped with 400 seats, projection facilities for both 16mm and 35mm, and re-opened in October 1952 as the National Film Theatre. It remained until 1957 when the NFT relocated to a cinema under Waterloo Bridge.

== Building ==
The Festival of Britain Office appointed Wells Coates to design a building on the South Bank where 35mm film, stereoscopic (3-D) and stereophonic film and large-screen television broadcasts could be shown. He created a grey, oblong building, constructed from light steel and soundproofed, in what Today's Cinema magazine at the time called, "a fly-away linear design [with a] gay façade and bold modern stare". It could seat 410 people, 252 in the stalls and 158 in the balcony. The foyer doubled as a television studio. It was operated and programmed by the BFI.

Although the Festival literature and British Film Institute (BFI) press releases called it the "Telecinema", the name on the outside of the building was Telekinema.

== Screenings ==
The Telecinema was the first cinema in the world specially designed and built to show both films and television. It created a heightened sense of realism by special effects that involved the audience more closely in what was shown. Among the techniques employed were a borderless screen and film with multiple soundtracks whose sound was reproduced through a series of loudspeakers behind the screen and in the auditorium. J.D. Ralph and R.J. Spottiswoode were responsible for the presentation and programme, which comprised a feature film, fourteen documentaries, four experimental films and four 'stereoscopic' (3-D) films.
