= Football Heroes of the Block =

- Theatrical release poster
- Spanish: Héroes de barrio
- Directed by: Ángeles Reiné
- Screenplay by: Antonio Prieto; Ángeles Reiné
- Produced by: Antonio Pérez; Eduardo Galdo; Eduardo Campoy
- Starring: Antonio Pagudo; Luna Fulgencio; Alex O'Dogherty; Lisi Linder; Antonio Dechent; Jesús Olmedo
- Cinematography: Alberto Pareja
- Edited by: Ana Álvarez Ossorio
- Music by: Alfonso Casado
- Production companies: Spal Films; Álamo Producciones; Galdo Media; Palacios Gador AIE
- Distributed by: A Contracorriente Films
- Release dates: 25 March 2022 (Málaga); 29 July 2022 (Spain)
- Country: Spain
- Language: Spanish

Football Heroes of the Block (Spanish: Héroes de barrio) is a 2022 Spanish comedy film directed by Ángeles Reiné which stars Antonio Pagudo and Luna Fulgencio alongside Lisi Linder, Antonio Dechent, Álex O'Dogherty, and Jesús Olmedo.

== Plot ==
Set in a suburb of Seville, the plot follows a man at a low ebb (Luis), who (falsely) told to be a friend of famous footballer Joaquín to his daughter Paula, a 9-year-old wannabe footballer. Upon lying to Paula, Luis does everything he can not to let her down. Meanwhile Luis yearns to be back with former partner Carmen, Paula's mom. Luis is supported by his father (a former boxer) and friend Litos to win Carmen's love back.

== Cast ==
- Luna Fulgencio as Paula
- Antonio Pagudo as Luis
- Lisi Linder as Carmen
- Antonio Dechent as Don Paco
- Álex O'Dogherty as Litos
- Jesús Olmedo as Mario
- Joaquín as himself

== Production ==
The screenplay was penned by Antonio Prieto and Ángeles Reiné. The film was produced by Spal Films, Álamo Producciones and Galdo Media, alongside AIE Palacios Gador, with the collaboration of ICAA, Junta de Andalucía, and Canal Sur. Filming started in March 2021 in Alcalá de Guadaíra.

== Release ==
The film screened on 25 March 2022 at the 25th Málaga Film Festival. Distributed by A Contracorriente Films, it was theatrically released in Spain on 29 July 2022.

== Reception ==
Raquel Hernández Luján of HobbyConsolas scored 50 points ("so-so"), deeming Héroes de barrio to be a "rather predictable and unambitious" film overall.

Oti Rodríguez Marchante of ABC rated the film 2 out of 5 stars, deeming it to be a "well-intentioned comedy", "in the sense that its greatest aim is not to ruin the day of even one of the viewers who come to see it".

Carlos Marañón of Cinemanía rated the film 2½ out of 5 stars, deeming it to be a "simple but honest film, with shortcomings" (...) "but with sparkle".

== Accolades ==
Year	Award	Category	Nominee(s)	Result	Ref.
2023	2nd Carmen Awards	Best Actress	Lisi Linder	Nominated	
2023	2nd Carmen Awards	Best Art Direction	Lala Obrero	Nominated	
2023	2nd Carmen Awards	Best Cinematography	Alberto Pareja	Nominated	

== See also ==
- List of Spanish films of 2022
