= Oliver's Universe =

- Poster
- Spanish: El universo de Óliver
- Directed by: Alexis Morante
- Screenplay by: Miguel Ángel González; Alexis Morante; Raúl Santos
- Based on: El universo de Óliver by Miguel Ángel González
- Produced by: José Alba; Olmo Figueredo González-Quevedo; Cristina Zumárraga
- Starring: Salva Reina; María León; Pedro Casablanc; Rubén Fulgencio
- Production companies: Pecado Films; La Claqueta PC; Sinehan Capital AIE; 700G Films; Andarams Films
- Distributed by: Filmax (ES)
- Release dates: 7 May 2022 (Algeciras); 13 May 2022 (Spain)
- Countries: Spain; United States; Romania
- Language: Spanish

Oliver's Universe (Spanish: El universo de Óliver) is a 2022 coming-of-age film directed by Alexis Morante which stars Rubén Fulgencio as the title character alongside Salva Reina, María León and Pedro Casablanc. It adapts the novel El universo de Óliver by Miguel Ángel González Carrasco.

== Plot ==
Set in 1985, with the backdrop of the approach of Comet Halley to Earth, the plot tracks the mishaps of Óliver, an overly imaginative tween, who, having just moved together with his parents to the home of crazed grandfather Gabriel near Algeciras, seeks the latter's help in order to cope with his problems.

== Cast ==
- Rubén Fulgencio as Óliver
- Salva Reina as Miguel
- María León as Carmela
- Pedro Casablanc as Gabriel
- Luna Berroa as Irene
- Lorca Gutiérrez Prada as Marcos
- Roberto Campillo as Adrián
- Sergio Ramos as Jon
- Antonio López Vallejo as Lucas
- Elsa Benítez as Malena
- Ismael Heredia as Rolo
- Yeray Heredia as Schuster
- Iván Renedo as Joel
- Samuel Cote as Lorenzo Lamas
- Fran Torres as Lucrecio
- Moreno Borja as Manuel
- Mara Guil as Toñi
- Ignacio Mateos as Arturo
- María Alfonsa Rosso as Abuela Irene
- Joaquín Núñez as Amancio

== Production ==
An adaptation of the novel El universo de Óliver by Miguel Ángel González, the screenplay was penned by Miguel Ángel González, Alexis Morante and Raúl Santos. The film was produced by Pecado Films (José Alba) and La Claqueta PC (Olmo Figueredo González-Quevedo) alongside Sinehan Capital AIE. It had the participation of RTVE, Canal Sur and CreaSGR, funding from ICO, and support from Creative Europe's MEDIA, Junta de Andalucía and Mancomunidad de Municipios del Campo de Gibraltar. It was shot in Campo de Gibraltar in 2021.

Bunbury performed a theme for the film: "Esperando una señal", produced by Rafa Sardina and otherwise also featuring Mike Garson (piano), Carmine Rojas (bass), Rafael Padilla (percussionist), Victor Indrizzo (drums) and Gabi Martínez (guitar).

== Release ==
The film was pre-screened on 7 May 2022 at the Algeciras' Teatro Municipal Florida. Distributed by Filmax, the film had a wide release in Spanish theatres on 13 May 2022.

== Reception ==
Sergio F. Pinilla of Cinemanía rated the film with 4 out of 5 stars assessing that it blends the fantasy imagery of films from the 1980s with the family portrait of a society and era, bringing in a universe in "which children and adults, gitanos and payos, the unfortunate and the fortunate, live side by side and collide".

Pablo Vázquez of Fotogramas rated the film 3 out of 5 stars, considering that it allows a committed cast to shine while the overall product perhaps languishes compared to other works, highlighting "a gigantic Casablanc and a no less brilliant Reina" and the subplot pertaining the girl respectively as the best and worst things about the film.

== Accolades ==
Year	Award	Category	Nominee(s)	Result	Ref.
2023	2nd Carmen Awards	Best Director	Alexis Morante	Nominated	
2023	2nd Carmen Awards	Best Actor	Salva Reina	Nominated	
2023	2nd Carmen Awards	Best Adapted Screenplay	Alexis Morante, Raúl Santos, Miguel Ángel González	Won	
2023	2nd Carmen Awards	Best Supporting Actress	María León	Nominated	
2023	2nd Carmen Awards	Best Supporting Actor	Pedro Casablanc	Nominated	
2023	2nd Carmen Awards	Best New Actor	Lorca Gutiérrez Prada	Won	
2023	2nd Carmen Awards	Best Costume Design	Lourdes Fuentes	Nominated	
2023	2nd Carmen Awards	Best Sound	Diana Sagrista, Vicente Villaescusa	Nominated	
2023	2nd Carmen Awards	Best Special Effects	Juan Ventura, Amparo Martínez	Won	
2023	31st Actors and Actresses Union Awards	Best Film Actor in a Secondary Role	Pedro Casablanc	Nominated	

== See also ==
- List of Spanish films of 2022
