= Laura Hojman =

Spanish film director, screenwriter, and documentary filmmaker (born 1981)

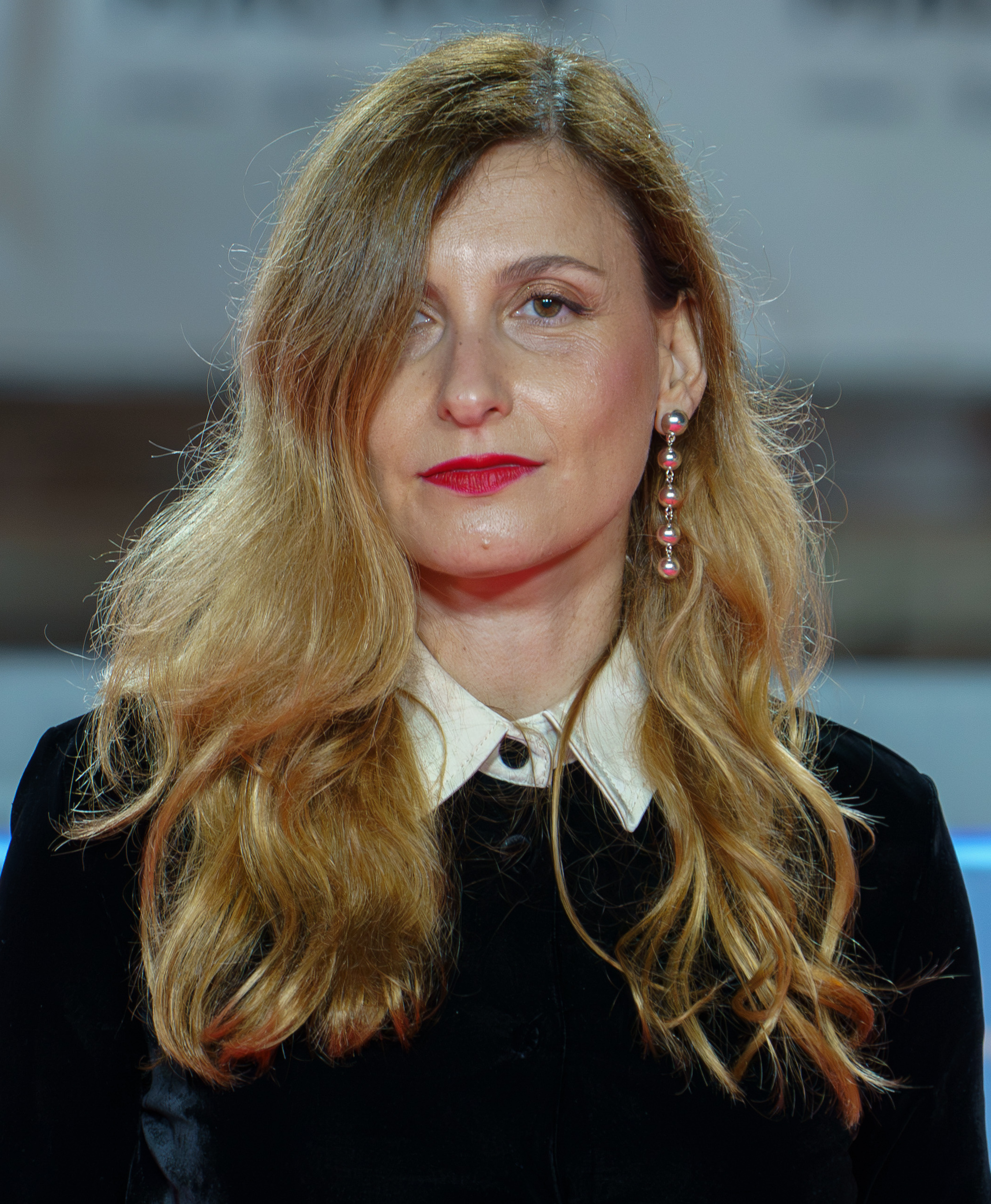
- Hojman at Malaga Film Festival 2025
- Born: Laura Hojman; 17 May 1981 (age 44); Seville, Spain
- Education: University of Seville (BA in Art History and Cultural Management)
- Occupations: Film director; Screenwriter; Documentary filmmaker; Film producer
- Years active: 2016–present
- Notable work: Antonio Machado. Los días azules (2020); A las mujeres de España. María Lejárraga (2022); Un hombre libre (2024)
- Awards: Goya Award nomination (2023); Feroz Award nomination (2023); ASECAN Josefina Molina Award (2025)

Laura Hojman (born 17 May 1981) is a Spanish film director, screenwriter, and documentary filmmaker. She is best known for her biographical documentaries focusing on Spanish literary figures.

== Early life and education ==
She graduated with a degree in Art History and Cultural Management from the University of Seville.

Her interest in cinema began when she started working at the Seville European Film Festival, where she first came into contact with the film industry. She initially worked as a documentary filmmaker, then as a screenwriter, and eventually transitioned to directing.

== Career ==
=== Early work and Summer Films (2016–2020) ===
In 2016, Hojman co-founded the independent production company Summer Films with Guillermo Rojas. The company specializes in the development of documentary projects and the production and distribution of independent, auteur, and documentary cinema. Summer Films is a member of ANCINE (Andalusian Association of Film Producers), and their works typically focus on historical memory, education, culture, and nature.

Hojman made her directorial debut with the documentary Tierras solares (2018), which explored the trajectory of poet Rubén Darío. The film premiered in the DOC.España section of the Valladolid International Film Festival (SEMINCI).

=== Documentary breakthrough (2020–2022) ===
Hojman's second feature film, Antonio Machado. Los días azules (2020), focused on the Sevillian poet Antonio Machado. The documentary was screened at the Seville European Film Festival and featured a "subtle but profound emotional charge constructed through historical narrative, testimonies, and the capture of the essence of the author's texts." The film included the voice of actor Pedro Casablanc, brief animated fragments, and musical accompaniment.

The film received significant recognition, earning Hojman the Best Director award at the ASECAN Andalusian Film Awards in 2020.

In 2022, Hojman directed A las mujeres de España. María Lejárraga, a documentary about the recovery of women's historical memory. Hojman discovered María Lejárraga while reading works by Antonina Rodrigo, an Andalusian author who has rescued from oblivion women who played fundamental roles in Spanish history.

=== Recent recognition (2023–present) ===
A las mujeres de España. María Lejárraga achieved unprecedented recognition for a Spanish documentary, becoming the only Spanish documentary film to be nominated for all three major national film awards: the Goya Awards, Feroz Awards, and Forqué Awards.

In 2024, Hojman completed Un hombre libre (A Free Man), a documentary about the life of exiled writer Agustín Gómez Arcos. The 88-minute film, co-written with María D. Valderrama, is scheduled for commercial release in 2025.

In March 2025, Hojman received the ASECAN Josefina Molina Award at the 24th Spanish Film Festival of Jaén, recognizing her cinematographic trajectory.

=== Other activities ===
Hojman is a member of ANCINE (Andalusian Association of Film Producers) and served as president of AAMMA (Andalusian Association of Women in Audiovisual Media) from 2020 to 2021. She approaches cinema from a perspective of political commitment, with her works consistently addressing themes of historical memory, education, culture, and nature.

Her documentaries have been selected for prestigious national and international festivals, including SEMINCI, the Seville European Film Festival, the Ibero-American Film Festival of Huelva, Alcances, and the Málaga Film Festival.

== Filmography ==
=== As director ===
Year	Title	English title	Notes
2018	Tierras solares	Solar Lands	Documentary about Rubén Darío
2020	Antonio Machado. Los días azules	Antonio Machado. The Blue Days	Documentary about Antonio Machado
2022	A las mujeres de España. María Lejárraga	To the Women of Spain. María Lejárraga	Documentary about María Lejárraga
2024	Un hombre libre	A Free Man	Documentary about Agustín Gómez Arcos

=== As screenwriter ===
Year	Title	English title	Role
2016	Acariciando el aire, Matilde Coral	Caressing the Air, Matilde Coral	Screenwriter
2018	Tierras solares	Solar Lands	Director and screenwriter
2019	Llamando al cielo	Calling to Heaven	Screenwriter
2019	Se prohíbe el cante	Singing is Forbidden	Screenwriter
2020	Antonio Machado. Los días azules	Antonio Machado. The Blue Days	Director and screenwriter
2022	A las mujeres de España. María Lejárraga	To the Women of Spain. María Lejárraga	Director and screenwriter
2024	Un hombre libre	A Free Man	Director and screenwriter

=== As producer ===
Year	Title	Director	Notes
2020	Una vez más	Guillermo Rojas	Feature film - wardrobe direction
2024	Solos en la noche	Guillermo Rojas	

== Awards and nominations ==
Year	Award	Category	Work	Result
2020	RTVA Awards	Best Filmmaker of Andalusia	Antonio Machado. Los días azules	Won
2020	IMAGENERA Awards	Best Feature Film	Antonio Machado. Los días azules	Won
2020	Forqué Awards	Best Documentary Feature	Antonio Machado. Los días azules	Nominated
2021	ASFAAN Awards	Cinematographic Trajectory		Won
2021	ASECAN Awards	Andalusian Cinema	Antonio Machado. Los días azules	Won (6 awards)
2021	Goya Awards	Best Documentary Feature	Antonio Machado. Los días azules	Nominated (10 nominations)
2022	IX Festival Nuevo Cine Andaluz	Best Editing	A las mujeres de España. María Lejárraga	Won
2023	ASECAN Awards	Non-Fiction and Original Music	A las mujeres de España. María Lejárraga	Won
2023	Forqué Awards	Best Documentary Feature	A las mujeres de España. María Lejárraga	Nominated
2023	Feroz Awards	Best Documentary	A las mujeres de España. María Lejárraga	Nominated
2023	Carmen Awards	Best Documentary Feature	A las mujeres de España. María Lejárraga	Won
2023	Goya Awards	Best Documentary Feature	A las mujeres de España. María Lejárraga	Nominated
2025	ASECAN Josefina Molina Award	Cinematographic Trajectory		Won
