= Provincial Deputation of Almería =

Spanish institution in Andalusia

- Diputación Provincial de Almería
- Coat of arms

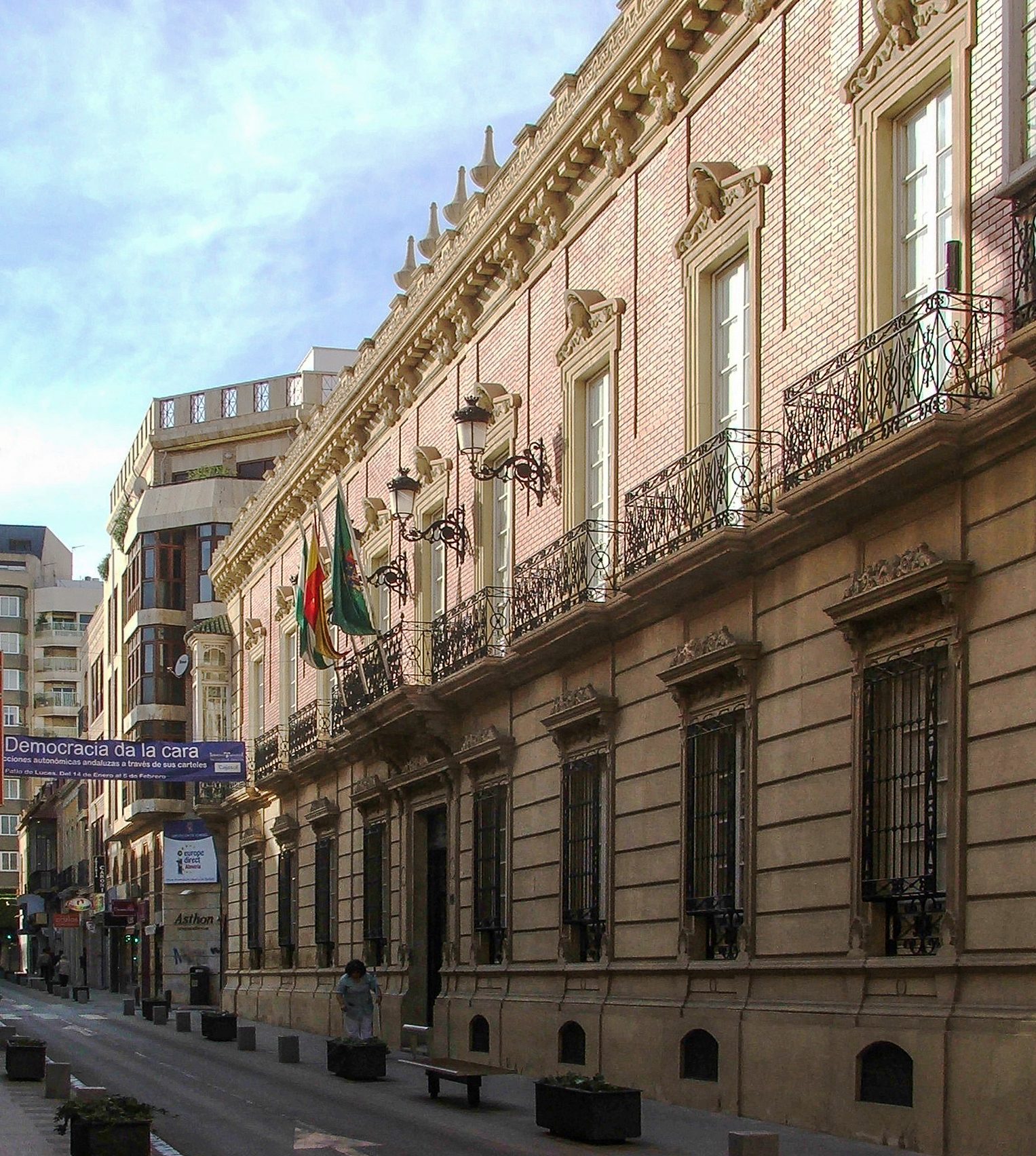
- Facade

Provincial Deputation overview
- Formed: 1884
- Jurisdiction: Province of Almería
- Headquarters: Palacio de la Diputación de Almería. Almería, Spain; 36°50′24″N 2°27′44″W
- Website: dipalme.org

Provincial Deputation of Almería (Spanish: Diputación Provincial de Almería) is the provincial government of the province of Almería, in the autonomous community of Andalusia, Spain.

From 2003 to 2007 it was presided by José Añez (PP), and from 2007 to 2011 by Juan Carlos Usero López (PSOE).

== Composition ==
Composition of the Deputation after the 2023 Spanish local elections
Political party	Votes	%	Deputies
People's Party of Andalusia (PPA)	139,502	48.25%	16
Spanish Socialist Workers' Party of Andalusia (PSOE-A)	83,273	28.80%	8
Vox (VOX)	26,579	9.19%	3

== List of presidents ==
- 1995–2003: Luis Rogelio Rodríguez-Comendador (PP)
- 2003–2007: José Añez Sánchez (PP; Almería Party from 2005)
- 2007–2011: Juan Carlos Usero López (PSOE)
- 2011–2019: Gabriel Amat Ayllón (PP)
- 2019–2025: Javier Aureliano García (PP)
- 2025–present: Ángel Escobar Céspedes (PP) (Note: Interim president)

== Bibliography ==
- Espinosa Spínola, Mª Gloria (2006). Guía artística de Almería y su provincia. Almería: Instituto de Estudios Almerienses.
- Cara Barrionuevo, Lorenzo (2008). La ciudad de Almería. Colección Guías de Almería: Territorio, cultura y arte. Almería: Instituto de Estudios Almerienses.
