= Salva Reina =

Spanish actor and stand-up comedian

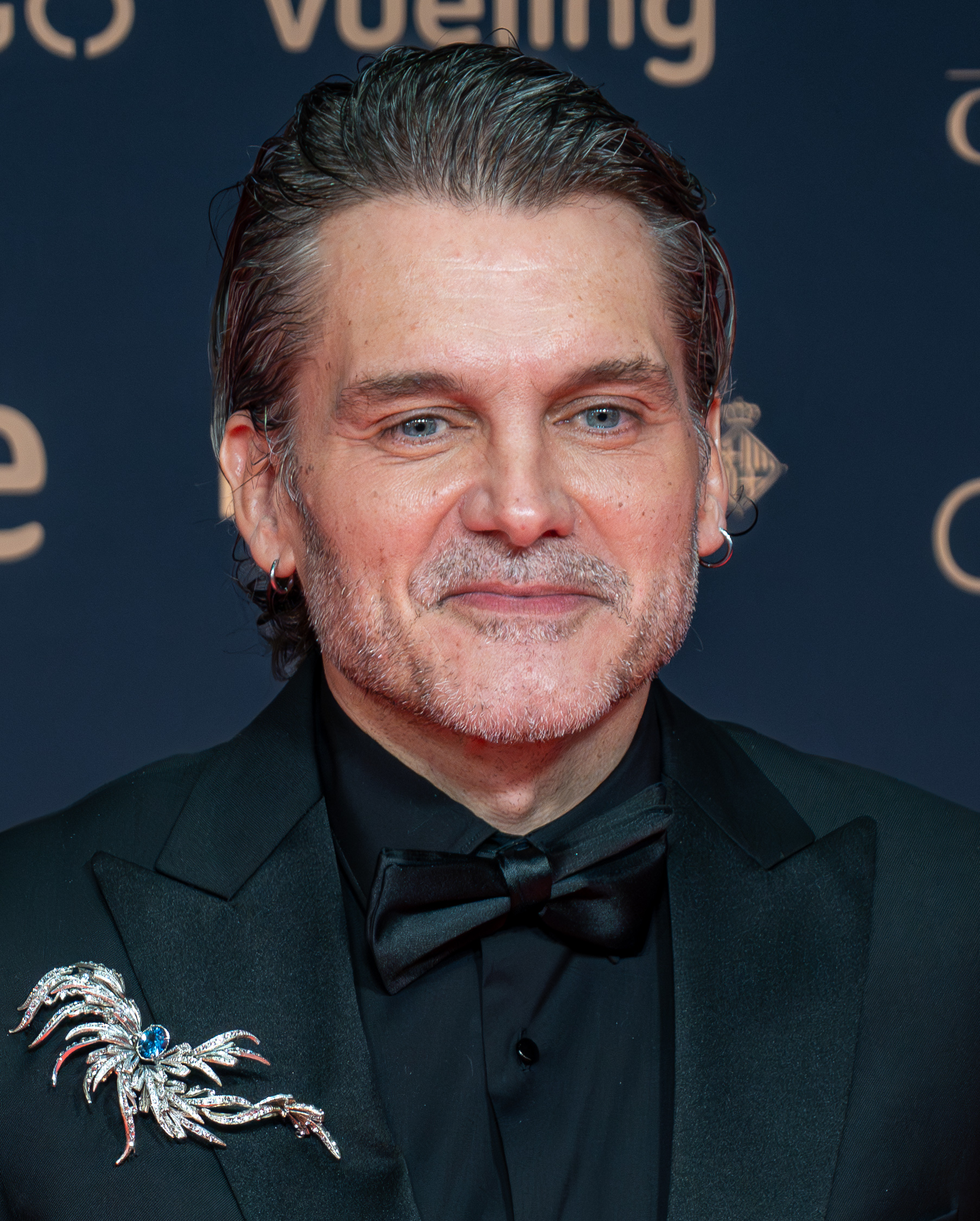
- Reina in 2026
- Born: Salvador Reina Girona; 9 April 1978 (age 48); Las Palmas, Spain
- Occupations: Actor; stand-up comedian
- Partner: Kira Miró (since 2022)

Salvador "Salva" Reina Girona (born 9 April 1978) is a Spanish actor and stand-up comedian, often referred to in the industry by the nickname 'Chuki'. He became known for performances in television series such as Allí abajo and Sabuesos or the film Marshland.

== Life and career ==
Salvador Reina Girona was born in Las Palmas on 9 April 1978, and was raised in Málaga. (Note: Older sources cite Málaga to be his birthplace.) He studied a degree in Sport Sciences in Granada. He landed his debut in a feature film with a role in Enrique García's 321 Days in Michigan, playing an inmate. He was cast afterwards for the Alberto Rodríguez's film Marshland in the role of Jesús, which advanced his career.

In 2021, he was awarded the Huelva Film Festival's Premio Luz, which recognised his whole career, mainly in the scope of comedy, both in television and film. After meeting on the set of Todos lo hacen in 2021, he began a relationship with actress Kira Miró in 2022.

He won the Goya Award for Best Supporting Actor in 2025 for his role in the period drama The 47 as Felipín, an immigrant from Málaga relocated to Barcelona.

== Filmography ==
Television

Year	Title	Role	Notes	Ref.
2015–19	Allí abajo	José Gregorio Narváez Murillo, "Jozé"	Main	
2018	Sabuesos	Alberto	Main	
2019	Malaka	Darío, "el Gato"	Main	
2021	Deudas	Raúl Carranza	Main	
2022	Feria: La luz más oscura (Feria: The Darkest Light)	TBA		

Film

Year	Title	Role	Notes	Ref.
2014	321 días en Míchigan (321 Days in Michigan)	Juani		
2014	La isla mínima (Marshland)	Jesús		
2016	Villaviciosa de al lado	Nino		
2017	Señor, dame paciencia (Lord, Give Me Patience)	Leo		
2019	Antes de la quema (The Burning)	Quique		
2019	Adiós (Bye)	Kempes		
2020	Hasta que la boda nos separe (The Wedding Unplanner)	Capitán		
2020	La lista de los deseos	Toni		
2021	Con quién viajas (Carpoolers)	Julián		
2022	Todos lo hacen	Sergio		
2022	El universo de Óliver (Oliver's Universe)	Miguel		
2023	Tregua(s) (Truce(s))	Edu		
2024	El 47 (The 47)	Felipín		

== Accolades ==
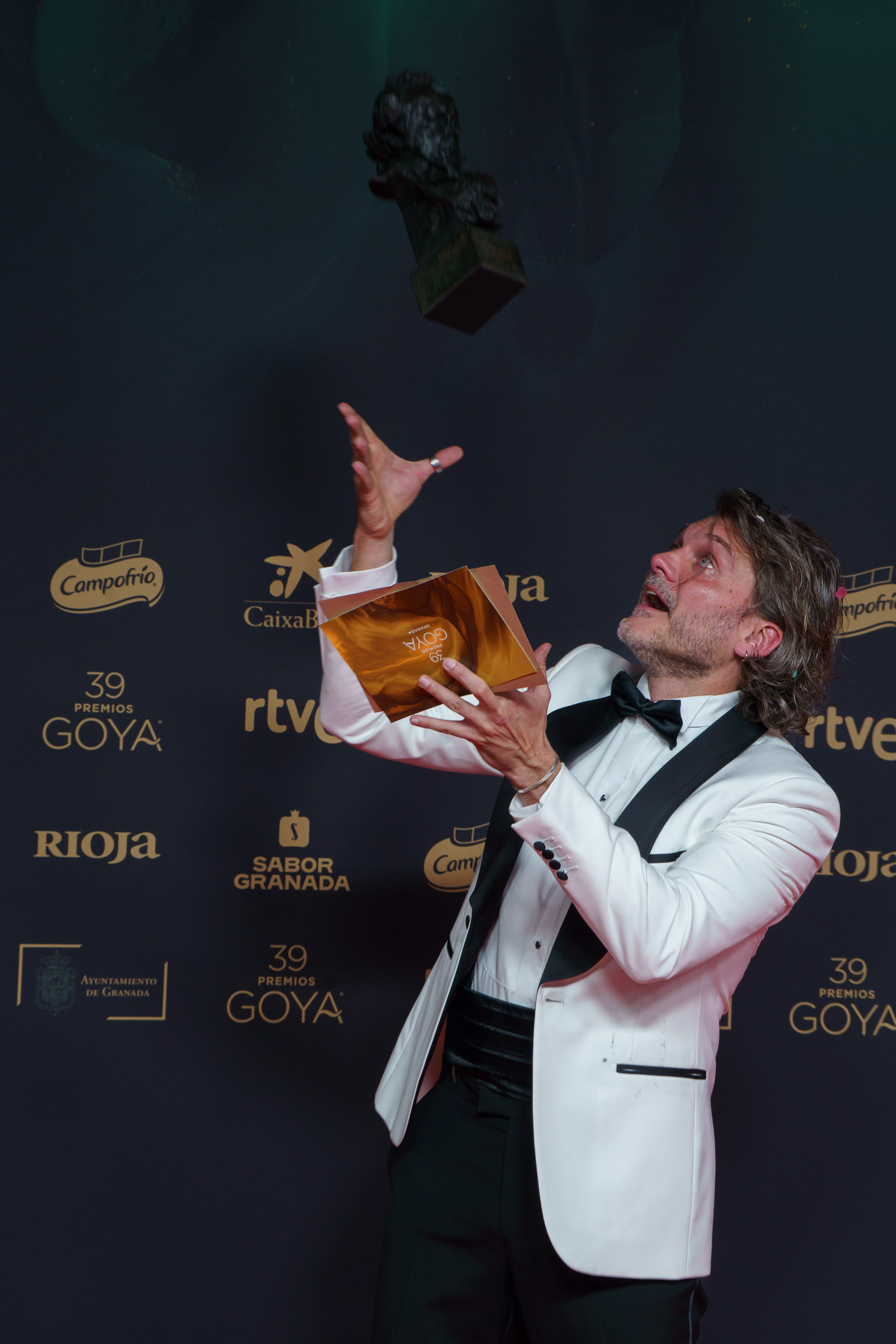
Reina juggling with his Goya Award for Best Supporting Actor in 2025

Year	Award	Category	Work	Result	Ref.
2013	16th Málaga Spanish Film Festival	Silver Biznaga for Best Supporting Actor	321 días en Míchigan	Won	
2021	22nd Iris Awards	Best Actor	Malaka	Nominated	
2021	47th Huelva Ibero-American Film Festival	Honorary Award (Premio Luz)	n/a	Won	
2023	2nd Carmen Awards	Best Actor	Oliver's Universe	Nominated	
2024	3rd Carmen Awards	Best Actor	Truce(s)	Nominated	
2025	4th Carmen Awards	Best Actor	Tu madre o la mía	Nominated	
2025	80th CEC Medals	Best Supporting Actor	The 47	Nominated	
2025	39th Goya Awards	Best Supporting Actor	The 47	Won	
