= Malviviendo =

Spanish online series

- Genre: Comedy
- Country of origin: Spain
- Original language: Spanish
- No. of episodes: 30

Production
- Running time: Approx. 30-50 minutes

Original release
- Release: November 24, 2008 – present

Malviviendo (Spanish for bad living) is an online series produced by Diffferent and directed by David Sainz. In July 2011, the show released its fourteenth episode. The first episode launched on November 24, 2008, and became successful in a few months with positive reviews by the public.

It employs mostly amateur actors, and those involved in the series do it for free.

The series is set in the fictional neighborhood of "Los Banderilleros" of the Spanish city of Seville. The characters are a group of friends trapped in their everyday bad lives related to consumption of cannabis or other problems individual to each character.

The show contains allusions to and parodies of a variety of other series, including Dexter, My Name Is Earl, The Sopranos, Lost, ALF, The X-Files, Prison Break, Sex and the City, The Brady Bunch, South Park, Boardwalk Empire, The IT Crowd and How I Met Your Mother. Also the Spanish program Callejeros chain Cuatro in the fifth episode called Callejosos. In the third episode of the second season spoof the header of the series Misfits, but the content of the episode is a parody of the movie Memento (film).

In June 2009, the series got the support of Qualid (a project of Nokia's sponsorship of artists). There it launched two mini-episodes minicapítulos. One focused on the character of Mateo and the other in "el Puto".

== Episodes ==
=== First season ===
- Me llaman Negro (They Call Me Negro)
- La cosecha (The Crop)
- El próximo antes de ayer (The Next Day Before Yesterday)
- Chair Driver
- Callejosos
- Cuentos y Leyendas (Stories and Legends)
- Módulo tres (Module Three)
- No Girls
- Cicatrices (Scars)
- Se vende (For Sale)

=== Second season ===
- La verdadera historia de Jesús Blanco (The True Story of Jesús Blanco)
- Fumar juntos, morir solos (Smoke Together, Die Alone)
- Mi amigo Walt (My Friend Walt)
- Mala vida sana (Healthy Bad Life)
- 23 dias en Los Banderilleros Parte 1 (23 days in The Banderilleros Part 1)
- 23 dias en Los Banderilleros Parte 2 (23 days in The Banderilleros Part 2)
- Amapolas Vs Jaramagos (Poppy Flowers Vrs Mustard Flowers)
- Amor y Muerte (Love and Death)
- Negra Navidad (Black Christmas)
- 13.000€(€13.000)

=== Third season ===
- La cosa está negra (Primera parte) (The thing is black (First Part))
- La cosa está negra (Segunda parte) (The thing is black (Second Part))
- Tetas y Collejas (Tits and slaps)
- Plan Pardo (Brown plan)
- Patrullero (Patroller)
- Traumusical
- Rescate en Los Banderilleros (Rescue Banderilleros)
- Felices 30 años (Happy 30 years)
- Asignaturas Pendientes (Unfinished subjects)
- Orgullo Banderillero (Banderillero pride)

=== Mini-episodes Minicapítulos ===
- Kazakievo
- Puto destino puto
- Mortal Topic
- Mortal Topic 2: Salvar al soldado Pardo
