= Goya Award for Best Fictional Short Film =

Annual award by the Spanish Film Academy

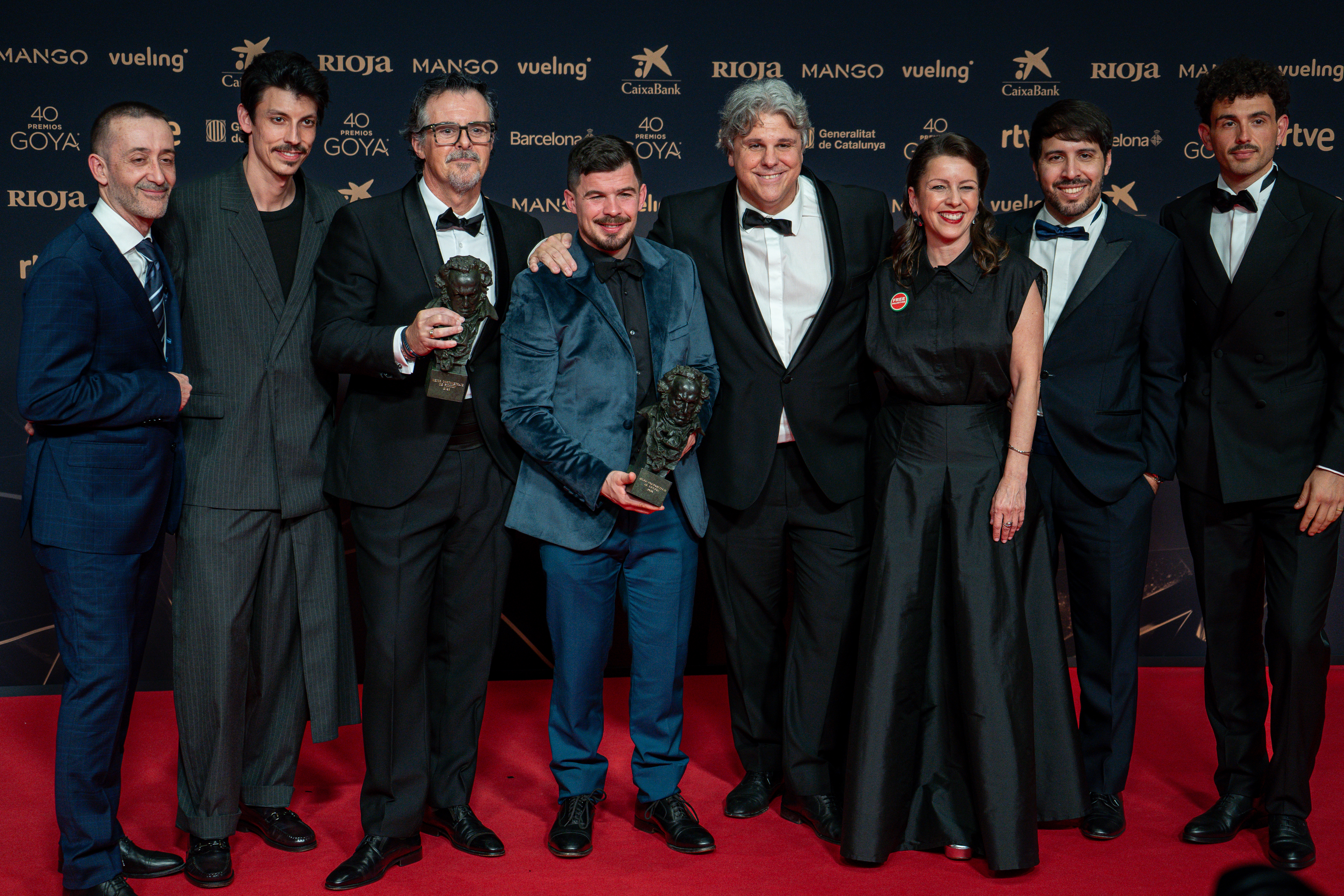
- Team of Ángulo muerto, the 2026 winner
- Native name: Premio Goya a la mejor cortometraje de ficción
- Awarded for: Best Spanish fictional short film of the year
- Country: Spain
- Presented by: Academy of Cinematographic Arts and Sciences of Spain (AACCE)
- First award: 4th Goya Awards (1989)
- Most recent winner: Ángulo muerto (2025)
- Website: Official website

The Goya Award for Best Fictional Short Film (Spanish: Premio Goya a la mejor cortometraje de ficción) is one of the Goya Awards presented annually by the Academy of Cinematographic Arts and Sciences of Spain (AACCE) since the 4th edition of the awards in 1989. From 1989 to 1991 there was only one award for short films under the name Best Short Film ("Mejor cortometraje"), since 1992 it has been presented under its current for fictional short films.

The short films Esposados (1996), That Wasn't Me (2012), Timecode (2016) and Mother (2017) have received a nomination for the Academy Award for Best Live Action Short Film. At the European Film Awards, the films The Runner (2015) and Suc de Síndria (2019) have been nominated to Best Short Film while Timecode (2016) won the award.

== Winners and nominees ==
=== 1980s ===
Best Short Film

Year	English title	Original title	Director(s)	Producer(s)
1989 (4th)	El reino de Victor		Juanma Bajo Ulloa	Juanma Bajo Ulloa
1989 (4th)	Kilómetro cero: la partida		Juan Luis Mendiaraz	Juan Luis Mendiaraz
1989 (4th)	El número marcado		Juan Manuel Chumilla	Elías Querejeta

=== 1990s ===
Year	English title	Original title	Director(s)	Producer(s)
1990 (5th)	El viaje del agua		Gracia Querejeta, Nacho Pérez de la Paz and Jesús Ruiz	Elías Querejeta
1990 (5th)	Blanco o negro		Andrés Sáenz de Heredia	Andrés Sáenz de Heredia
1990 (5th)	Indefenso		Jesús R. Delgado	Producciones Nictálopes
1991 (6th)	La viuda negra		Jesús R. Delgado	Jesús R. Delgado
1991 (6th)	Eduardo		Diana de Pietri	Diana de Pietri
1991 (6th)	La doncella virtuosa o el martirio de San Pedro		Vicente Pérez	Vicente Pérez
1991 (6th)	Ni contigo ni sin ti		Gerardo Herrero	Gerardo Herrero

Best Fictional Short Film

Year	English title	Original title	Director(s)	Producer(s)
1992 (7th)	El columpio		Álvaro Fernández Armero	Álvaro Fernández Armero
1992 (7th)	Oro en la pared		Jesús R. Delgado	Jesús R. Delgado
1992 (7th)	Huntza		Antonio Conesa	Antonio Conesa
1993 (8th)	Perturbado		Santiago Segura	Santiago Segura
1993 (8th)	Cita con Alberto		Josu Bilbao	Josu Bilbao
1993 (8th)	Ivorsi		Josep María Canyamera	Josep María Canyameras
1993 (8th)	Maldita suerte		José María Borrell	José María Borrell
1993 (8th)	Quien mal anda mal acaba		Carles Sans	Carles Sans
1994 (9th)	Aquel ritmillo		Javier Fesser	Javier Fesser
1994 (9th)	Sangre ciega		Ángeles Albaladejo, Miguel Albaladejo	Ángeles Albaladejo, Miguel Albaladejo
1994 (9th)	Se paga al acto		Teresa Marcos	Teresa Marcos
1995 (10th)	La madre		Miguel Bardem	Unión Industrial Cinematográfica
1995 (10th)	Entre vías		Juan Vicente Córdoba	Juan Vicente Córdoba
1995 (10th)	Escrito en la piel		Judith Colell	Judith Colell
1995 (10th)	Hábitos		Juan Flahn	Juan Flahn
1995 (10th)	Solo amor		José Javier Rodríguez	José Javier Rodríguez
1996 (11th)	La viga		Roberto Lázaro	Roberto Lázaro
1996 (11th)	David		Carlos Sans	Carlos Sans
1996 (11th)	El tren de las ocho		Esteban Requejo	Esteban Requejo
1996 (11th)	Esposados		Juan Carlos Fresnadillo	Juan Carlos Fresnadillo
1996 (11th)	La gotera		Jorge Sánchez-Cabezudo, Eduardo Giménez Rojo "Grojo"	Jorge Sánchez-Cabezudo, Eduardo Giménez Rojo "Grojo"
1997 (12th)	Cazadores		Achero Mañas	Achero Mañas
1997 (12th)	Campeones		Antonio Conesa	Samarkanda
1997 (12th)	En medio de ninguna parte		Javier Rebollo	Javier Rebollo
1997 (12th)	Hola, mamá		Pablo Fernández	
1997 (12th)	Pasaia		Mikel Aguirresarobe	Mikel Aguirresarobe
1998 (13th)	Un día perfecto		Jacobo Rispa	Jacobo Rispa
1998 (13th)	Génesis		Nacho Cerdà	Nacho Cerdà
1998 (13th)	Patesnak, un cuento de Navidad		Iñaki Elizalde	Iñaki Elizalde
1998 (13th)	Rufino		Octavi Masiá	Octavi Masiá
1998 (13th)	Viaje a la luna		Frederic Amat	Frederic Amat
1999 (14th)	Siete cafés por semana		Juana Macías	Juana Macías
1999 (14th)	Back Room		Guillem Morales	Guillem Morales
1999 (14th)	El paraíso perdido		Jaime Marqués	Avalon
1999 (14th)	Lencería de ocasión		Teresa Marcos	Teresa Marcos
1999 (14th)	Obsesión		Carlos Esteban	Carlos Esteban

=== 2000s ===
Year	English title	Original title	Director(s)	Producer(s)
2000 (15th)	Pantalones		Ana Martínez	Ana Martínez
2000 (15th)	El puzzle		Belén Macías	Belén Macías
2000 (15th)	Los Almendros–Plaza Nueva		Álvaro Alonso	Álvaro Alonso
2000 (15th)	The Raven... Nevermore		Tinieblas González	Tinieblas González
2000 (15th)	El beso de la tierra		Lucinda Torre	Lucinda Torre
2001 (16th)	Desaliñada		Gustavo Salmerón	Gustavo Salmerón
2001 (16th)	Bamboleho		Luis Prieto	Luis Prieto
2001 (16th)	La mirada obliqua		Jesús Monllaó	Jesús Monllaó
2001 (16th)	La primera vez		Borja Cobeaga	Borja Cobeaga
2001 (16th)	V.O.		Antonia San Juan	Antonia San Juan
2002 (17th)	Nada que perder		Rafa Russo	Rafa Russo
2002 (17th)	El espantapájaros		Gonzalo Zona	Gonzalo Zona
2002 (17th)	Historia de un búho		José Luis Acosta	José Luis Acosta
2002 (17th)	Hoy por ti, mañana por mí		Fran Torres	Fran Torres
2002 (17th)	Uno más, uno menos		Álvaro Pastor, Antonio Naharro	Álvaro Pastor, Antonio Naharro
2003 (18th)	Sueños		Daniel Guzmán	Daniel Guzmán
2003 (18th)	Carisma		David Planell	David Planell
2003 (18th)	En camas separadas		Javier Rebollo	Javier Rebollo
2003 (18th)	Exprés		Daniel Sánchez Arévalo	Daniel Sánchez Arévalo
2003 (18th)	Promoción, prohibida su venta		Luis Arribas	Luis Arribas
2004 (19th)	Diez minutos		Alberto Ruiz Rojo	Alberto Ruiz Rojo
2004 (19th)	Amigo, no gima		Iñaki Peñafiel	Iñaki Peñafiel
2004 (19th)	Cara sucia		Santiago A. Zannou	Santiago A. Zannou
2004 (19th)	La ruta natural		Álex Pastor	Álex Pastor
2004 (19th)	Viernes		Xavi Puebla	Xavi Puebla
2005 (20th)	Nana		José Javier Rodríguez Melcón	Enigma Films
2005 (20th)	Bota de oro		Ramón Tarrés, José Luis Baringo	Feng Shui Films, Toma 27
2005 (20th)	El examinador		José Antonio Pajares	Cachito Films
2005 (20th)	El intruso		David Cánovas	Free Run Producciones, Goodnews
2005 (20th)	Hiyab		Xavi Sala	Xavi Sala
2006 (21st)	A ciegas		Salvador Gómez Cuenca	Bisojo Interpretaciones, Nickel Odeón Dos
2006 (21st)	Contracuerpo		Eduardo Chapero-Jackson	Prosopopeya Producciones
2006 (21st)	Equipajes		Toni Bestard	The Legal Company Abogados
2006 (21st)	La guerra		Jorge Dorado, Luiso Berdejo	Lolita Producciones Cinematográficas, Samuel Martínez Martín
2006 (21st)	Propiedad privada		Ángeles Muñiz	Ángeles Muñiz
2007 (22nd)	Salvador (historia de un milagro cotidiano)		Abdelatif Hwidar	Abdelatif Hwidar
2007 (22nd)	El pan nuestro		Aitor Merino	Aitor Merino
2007 (22nd)	Padam...		José Manuel Carrasco	José Manuel Carrasco
2007 (22nd)	Paseo		Arturo Ruiz Serrano	Arturo Ruiz Serrano
2007 (22nd)	Proverbio chino		Javier San Román	Javier San Román
2008 (23rd)	Miente		Isabel de Ocampo	Isabel de Ocampo
2008 (23rd)	El encargado		Sergio Barrejón	Sergio Barrejón
2008 (23rd)	Final		Hugo Martín Cuervo	Hugo Martín Cuervo
2008 (23rd)	Machu-Pichu		Hatem Khraiche Ruiz–Zorrilla	Hatem Khraiche Ruiz–Zorrilla
2008 (23rd)	Porque hay cosas que nunca se olvidan		Lucas M. Figueroa	Lucas M. Figueroa
2009 (24th)	Dime que yo		Mateo Gil	Mateo Gil, Raúl Bernabé
2009 (24th)	La Tama		Martín Costa	Martín Costa
2009 (24th)	Lala		Esteban Crespo	Esteban Crespo
2009 (24th)	Terapia		Nuria Verde	Nuria Verde

=== 2010s ===
Year	English title	Original title	Director(s)	Producer(s)
2010 (25th)	Una caja de botones		María Reyes Arias González	Pablo Blanco
2010 (25th)	Adiós papá, adiós mamá		Luis Soravilla	Enrique Villén Moya
2010 (25th)	El orden de las cosas		José Esteban Alenda, César Esteban Alenda	José Esteban Alenda, Nina Frese
2010 (25th)	Zumo de limón		Jorge Muriel	José Antonio Martínez Nieto, José Barrio Saavedra
2011 (26th)	El barco pirata		Fernando Trullols	Arturo Mendiz
2011 (26th)	El premio		Elías León Siminiani	Koldo Zuazua, Mónica Blas, Daniel Sánchez Arévalo
2011 (26th)	Matar a un niño		José Esteban Alenda, César Esteban Alenda	José Esteban Alenda, César Esteban Alenda
2011 (26th)	Meine Liebe		Ricardo Steinberg, Laura Pousa	Ricardo Steinberg
2012 (27th)	That Wasn't Me	Aquél no era yo	Esteban Crespo	Esteban Crespo
2012 (27th)	La boda		Marina Seresesky	Álvaro Lavin Martin
2012 (27th)	Ojos que no ven		Natalia Mateo	Stefan Schmitz, María Zamora
2012 (27th)	Voice Over		Martin Rosete	Koldo Zuazua, José Martin Rosete, Martin Rosete, Manuel Calvo, Sebastián Álvarez
2013 (28th)	Abstenerse agencias		Gaizka Urresti	Gaizka Urresti
2013 (28th)	De noche y de pronto		Arantxa Echevarría Carcedo	Pilar Sánchez Díaz
2013 (28th)	El paraguas de colores		Eduardo Cardoso	Eduardo Cardoso
2013 (28th)	Lucas		Álex Montoya Meliá	Álex Montoya Meliá
2013 (28th)	Pipas		Manuela Burló Moreno	Manuela Burlo Moreno
2014 (29th)	Café para llevar		Patricia Font	Sergi Casamitjana
2014 (29th)	Loco con ballesta		Kepa Sojo	Sonia Pacios
2014 (29th)	Safari		Gerardo Herrero Pereda	Gerardo Herrero Pereda
2014 (29th)	Todo un futuro juntos		Pablo Remón	Omar A. Razzak
2014 (29th)	Trato preferente		Carlos Polo	Eduardo Escribano Solera
2015 (30th)	The Runner	El corredor	José Luis Montesinos	Arturo Méndiz
2015 (30th)	Cordelias		Gracia Querejeta	Gracia Querejeta, Miguel Arrufat
2015 (30th)	El Trueno Rojo		Álvaro Ron	Álvaro Ron
2015 (30th)	Inside the Box		David Martín-Porras	Pau Brunet, David Matamoros Manteca
2015 (30th)	Os meninos do rio		Javier Macipe	Javier Macipe
2016 (31st)	Timecode		Juanjo Giménez	Arturo Méndiz, Daniel Villanueva, Juanjo Giménez
2016 (31st)	Bla, bla, bla		Alexis Morante	Alexis Morante
2016 (31st)	En la azotea		Damià Serra	Lita Roig, Sergi Casamitjana
2016 (31st)	Graffiti		Lluís Quílez Sala	Ester Velasco, Lluís Quílez Sala, Cristian Guijarro
2016 (31st)	La invitación		Susana Casares	María Zamora Morcillo, Stefan Schmitz
2017 (32nd)	Mother	Madre	Rodrigo Sorogoyen	Rodrigo Sorogoyen, María del Puy Alvarado
2017 (32nd)	Australia		Lino Escalera	Sergy Moreno, Lino Escalera, Damián París
2017 (32nd)	Baraka		Néstor Ruiz Medina	Fernando J. Monge
2017 (32nd)	Como yo te amo		Fernando García-Ruiz	Fernando García-Ruiz
2017 (32nd)	Extraños en la carretera		Carlos Solano	Juan San Román, Mikel Mas, Fello Matallana Royo, Miriam Rodríguez
2018 (33rd)	Cerdita		Carlota Pereda	Luis Ángel Ramírez, Mario Madueño
2018 (33rd)	9 pasos		Marisa Crespo, Moisés Romera	Marisa Crespo, Moisés Romera
2018 (33rd)	Bailaora		Rubin Stein	Rubin Stein
2018 (33rd)	El niño que quería volar		Jorge Muriel	Jaime Bartolomé, Jorge Muriel
2018 (33rd)	Matria		Álvaro Gago	Alberto Gago, Álvaro Gago, José Gago
2019 (34th)	Suc de síndria		Irene Moray	Miriam Porté
2019 (34th)	El nadador		Pablo Barce	César Martínez
2019 (34th)	Foreigner		Carlos Violadé Guerrero	Carlos Violadé Guerrero, Julio Vergne
2019 (34th)	Maras		Salvador Calvo	Manuel Sánchez Muñoz
2019 (34th)	Xiao Xian		Jiajie Yu Yan	Jiajie Yu Yan, Mario Lerma

=== 2020s ===
Year	English title	Original title	Director(s)	Producer(s)
2020 (35th)	A la cara		Javier Marco Rico	Javier Marco Rico
2020 (35th)	16 de diciembre		Álvaro Gago	Álvaro Gago, Mireia Graell Vivancos
2020 (35th)	Beef		Ingride Santos	Carla Sospedra
2020 (35th)	Gastos incluidos		Javier Macipe	Amelia Hernández, Javier Macipe
2020 (35th)	Lo efímero		Jorge Muriel	Jaime Bartolomé, Jorge Muriel
2021 (36th)	Tótem loba		Verónica Echegui	Álex García, Arturo Valls, Carmela Martínez Oliart, Félix Tusell Sánchez
2021 (36th)	Farrucas		Ian de la Rosa	Carlotta Schiavon, Inés Massa, Jana Díaz Juhl, Pau Brunet
2021 (36th)	Mindanao		Borja Soler	Eduardo Villanueva, Lorena Lluch
2021 (36th)	Votamos		Santiago Requejo	Santiago Requejo
2021 (36th)	Yalla		Carlo D'Ursi	Carlo D'Ursi
2022 (37th)	Arquitectura emocional 1959		León Siminiani	Ainhoa Ramírez Lucendo, León Siminiani, María Herrera
2022 (37th)	Chaval		Jaime Olías	Edduardo Viera, David Casas Riesco, Jiajie Yu Yan, Néstor Ruiz Medina
2022 (37th)	Cuerdas		Estibaliz Urresola Solaguren	Ana Angulo Umaran, Estibaliz Urresola Solaguren, Garazi Elorza, Itxaso Frau Terradillos, Lara Izagirre Garizurieta
2022 (37th)	La entrega		Pedro Díaz	Carlos Guerrero, César Benítez, David Casas Riesco, Felipe Salas, Fran Carballal, Manuel Manrique, Pablo de la Chica, Pablo Zorrilla, Pedro Díaz
2022 (37th)	Sorda		Eva Libertad, Nuria Muñoz Ortín	Nuria Muñoz Ortín
2023 (38th)	Aunque es de noche		Guillermo García López	Damien Megherbi, David Casas Riesco, Justin Pechberty, Marina García López, Pablo de la Chica
2023 (38th)	Carta a mi madre para mi hijo		Carla Simón	María Zamora Morcillo
2023 (38th)	Cuentas Divinas		Eulàlia Ramon	Anna Saura
2023 (38th)	La loca y el feminista		Sandra Gallego	María del Puy Alvarado, Penélope Cristóbal
2023 (38th)	Paris 70		Dani Feixas	Dani Feixas, Alba Forn
2024 (39th)	La gran obra		Àlex Lora	Lluís Quílez Sala
2024 (39th)	Betiko gaua (La noche eterna)		Eneko Sagardoy	Ander Barinaga-Rementeria Arano, Ander Sagardoy Múgica, Carmen Lacasa Aguinaga, Eneko Sagardoy, Paul Urkijo Alijo
2024 (39th)	Cuarentena		Celia de Molina	María del Puy Alvarado
2024 (39th)	El trono		Lucía Jiménez	Arturo Valls, Carmela Martínez Oliart, Félix Tusell Sánchez, Lucía Jiménez
2024 (39th)	Mamántula		Ion de Sosa	Ion de Sosa, Leire Apellaniz, Paola Alvarez, Tasio
2025 (40th)	Ángulo muerto		Cristian Beteta	José Luis Rancaño, Pablo López Torres
2025 (40th)	De sucre		Clàudia Cedó	Ariadna Dot, Rafa Molés, Tono Folguera
2025 (40th)	El cuento de una noche de verano		María Herrera	Emilia Fort, María Herrera, Stefan Schmitz
2025 (40th)	Sexo a los 70		Vanesa Romero	Beatriz Bodegas, Paloma Tejero, Raúl Ruano
2025 (40th)	Una cabeza en la pared		Manuel Manrique	Alberto Torres, Diego Saniz, Jorge Acosta, Manuel Manrique
