= María Pedraza =

Spanish actress (born 1996)

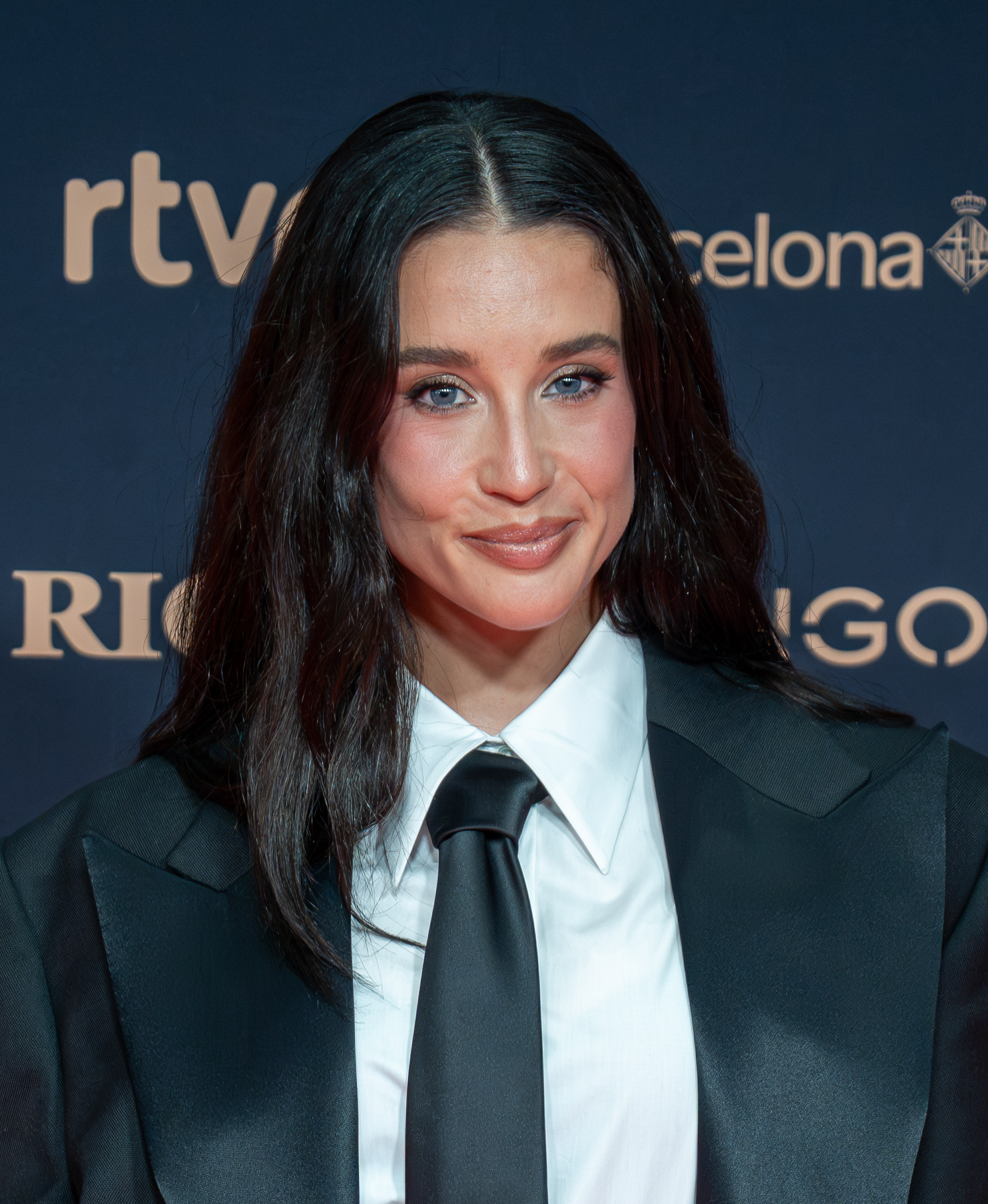
- Pedraza in 2026
- Born: María Pedraza Morillo; 26 January 1996 (age 30); Madrid, Spain
- Occupations: Dancer; Model; Actress
- Years active: 2017–present

María Pedraza Morillo (born 26 January 1996) is a Spanish actress, dancer and model who gained international recognition for her roles in the series Money Heist and Elite.

== Career ==
Pedraza was discovered through her Instagram account by film director Esteban Crespo who invited her to attend an audition for the lead role of his debut film Amar, where she was selected for the female lead role of Laura, joining a cast also made up of Pol Monen, Natalia Tena, Gustavo Salmerón and Nacho Fresneda.

Her second project as an actress was playing Alison Parker, daughter of the British ambassador to Spain, in the Atresmedia series Money Heist. The subsequent purchase of the series by Netflix earned the actress both national and international recognition. At the beginning of 2018, Pedraza's participation in the second Netflix original Spanish series entitled Élite was announced, with fellow Money Heist cast members Miguel Herrán and Jaime Lorente.

== Filmography ==
=== Film ===
Year	Title	Role	Notes	Ref.
2017	Amar (Amar: With You Until the End of the World)	Laura		
2019	¿A quién te llevarías a una isla desierta? (Who Would You Take to a Deserted Island?)	Marta		
2020	El verano que vivimos (The Summer We Lived)	Adela		
2021	Poliamor para principiantes (Polyamory for Dummies)	Amanda		
2021	Ego	Paloma / Goliadkin		
2022	Las niñas de cristal (Dancing on Glass)	Irene		
2023	Awareness	Esther		
2024	El correo (The Courier)	Leticia		
2026	Just Play Dead †	Bianca	Post-production	
TBA	Blurred †			

=== Television ===
Year	Title	Character	Channel	Notes	Ref.
2017	Si fueras tú	Alba Ruiz Alonso / Cristina "Cris" Romero	Playz	8 episodes	
2017	Money Heist	Alison Parker	Antena 3	15 episodes	
2018	Elite	Marina Nunier Osuna	Netflix	8 episodes	
2019–2021	Toy Boy	Triana Marín	Atresplayer Premium/Netflix		
2024	Asalto al Banco Central (Bank Under Siege)	Maider Garmendia			
2024	The Famous Five	Gabriela	BBC		

Pedraza also appears in the music video for the 2023 Myke Towers song, "Lala".
