= Amar (2017 film) =

Amar: With You Until the End of the World
- Theatrical release poster
- Spanish: Amar
- Directed by: Esteban Crespo
- Screenplay by: Esteban Crespo; Mario Fernández Alonso
- Produced by: Stefan Schmitz; María Zamora
- Starring: María Pedraza; Pol Monen; Natalia Tena
- Cinematography: Ángel Amorós
- Edited by: Vanessa Marimbert
- Music by: Adolfo Núñez
- Production companies: Avalon PC; Amar La Película AIE; Filmeu
- Distributed by: Avalon
- Release dates: 19 March 2017 (Málaga); 21 April 2017 (Spain)
- Country: Spain
- Language: Spanish

Amar: With You Until the End of the World (Spanish: Amar) is a 2017 Spanish romantic drama film directed by Esteban Crespo. It stars María Pedraza and Pol Monen alongside Natalia Tena.

== Plot ==
Laura and Carlos love each other as if every day is their last. Driven by the desire to control her own life and break free from her mother's control, Laura dreams of getting pregnant. Both search for their place in the world, but one year later and a little more mature, their deep passion is just a memory.

== Cast ==
- María Pedraza as Laura
- Pol Monen as Carlos
- Greta Fernández as Lola
- Natalia Tena as Merche, Laura's mother
- Nacho Fresneda as Laura's father
- María Caballero as Marta
- Jorge Silvestre as El Moro
- Paz Muñoz as Susana
- Gustavo Salmerón as Pablo
- Jorge Motos as Brother Carlos
- Antonio Valero as Carlos's father
- Sonia Almarcha as Carmen
- Marta Belenguer

== Production ==
Amar: With You Until the End of the World is Esteban Crespo's debut as a feature film director. It is based on the short film Amar, also directed by Crespo and starring Aida Folch and Alberto Ferreiro. The screenplay was penned by Crespo together with Mario Fernández Alonso. Stefan Schmitz and María Zamora were credited as producers. The film is a Avalon PC, Filmeu and Amar la Película AIE production, with the participation and support of TVE, ICAA, ICO, Filmin and Generalitat Valenciana.

== Release ==
The film was presented at the 20th Málaga Spanish Film Festival on 19 March 2017. Distributed by Avalon, it was theatrically released in Spain on 21 April 2017.

== Accolades ==
| Year | Award | Category | Nominee(s) | Result | Ref. |
|---|---|---|---|---|---|
| 2018 | 73rd CEC Medals | Best New Actor | Pol Monen | Nominated | |
| 2018 | 32nd Goya Awards | Best New Actor | Pol Monen | Nominated | |

== See also ==
- List of Spanish films of 2017
