= Nuestra Belleza Tamaulipas 2011 =

- Date: July 7, 2011
- Presenters: Nora Salinas, Oscar Schekaiban, Michelle Rubalcava, Nallely Chávez, Susana Treviño
- Entertainment: Kika Edgar
- Venue: Espacio Cultural Metropolitano, Tampico, Tamaulipas
- Broadcaster: Televisa
- Entrants: 11
- Placements: 4
- Winner: Karen Lizcano; Tampico

Nuestra Belleza Tamaulipas 2011 was held in the Espacio Cultural Metropolitano of Tampico, Tamaulipas on July 7, 2011. At the conclusion of the final night of competition Karen Lizcano of Tampico was crowned the winner. Lizcano was crowned by outgoing Nuestra Belleza Tamaulipas titleholder Claudia González. Eleven contestants competed for the title.

== Results ==
=== Placements ===
Final results	Contestant
Nuestra Belleza Tamaulipas 2011	Karen Lizcano
Suplente / 1st Runner-up	Gabriela Castañón
Finalists	Graciela Flores; Cristina Botello; Ana Gabriela Azuara

=== Special awards ===
Award	Contestant
Miss Photogenic	Malleny Gtz

== Judges ==
- Cecy Gutiérrez - Television Hosstes
- Silvia Ramírez - Actress
- Manolo Barroso - Photographer

== Background Music ==
- Kika Edgar - "Sin Él", "Acaríciame" & “Que Ganas de no Verte Nunca Más”.

== Contestants ==
Hometown	Contestant
Cd. Mante	Roxana Ortíz
Cd. Victoria	Gabriela Castañón Pérez
Cd. Victoria	Luisiana Isabel Juárez Novelo
Matamoros	Cristina Buentello Aguirre
Matamoros	Graciela Leticia Flores Hernández
Nuevo Laredo	Sagrario Monserrat Fuentes Ortiz
Río Bravo	Malleny Viridiana Gutiérrez Ruiz
Reynosa	Celina Millete Donada Rodríguez
Reynosa	Rebeca Abrego Díaz
Tampico	Karen Alejandra Lizcano Flores
Tampico	Ana Gabriela Azuara González
