= Timecode (disambiguation) =

Timecode may refer to:

- Timecode, a sequence of numeric codes generated at regular time intervals
- Timecode (1997 film), the second skateboarding film released by Alien Workshop
- Timecode (2000 film), an experimental film directed by Mike Figgis
- Timecode (2016 film), a live-action Spanish short film
