= Judith Fernández =

Spanish actress (born 2001)

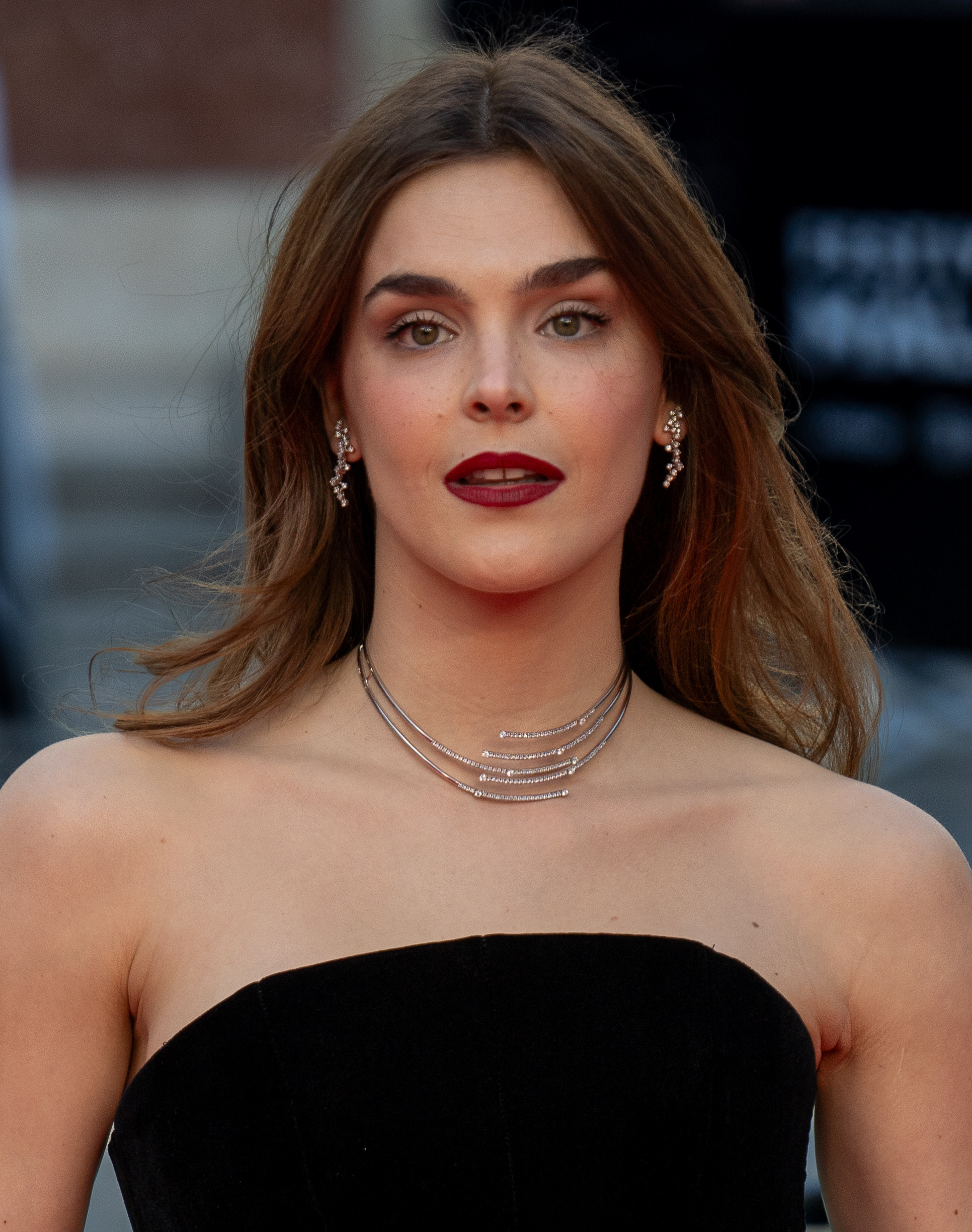
- Fernández at the Málaga Film Festival in 2026
- Born: April 2, 2001 (age 25); Corcubión, Province of A Coruña, Spain
- Occupation: Actress
- Years active: 2016–present

Judith Fernández (born 2 April 2001) is a Spanish actress from Galicia. She made her screen debut as a teenager in the Televisión de Galicia series Augasquentes (2016) and reached a nationwide audience as Azucena Quiñonero in the final season of the Televisión Española soap opera Acacias 38 (2021). She has since appeared in the series Santo (2022), Mía es la venganza (2023), El caso Asunta (2024), Entrepreneurs (2025) and Las hijas de la criada (2025–2026), and in the films La casa entre los cactus (2022) and Matusalén (2024). Her leading role as Andrea in Rondallas (2025), written and directed by Daniel Sánchez Arévalo, earned her a place on the preliminary voting lists of the Goya Awards for Best New Actress and a nomination in the same category at the 81st edition of the Medals of the Círculo de Escritores Cinematográficos.

== Early life and training ==
Fernández comes from Corcubión, a coastal village on the Costa da Morte. She lived in Edinburgh, Scotland, until the age of eleven and moved to Madrid at eighteen. No one else in her family works in the performing arts.

She began acting as a child at El Ruiseñor, a theatre company in A Coruña, under the direction of Susana Crespo, and remained a member until she was eighteen. She started working in front of a camera at fourteen; the actress María Vázquez, who played her mother in Augasquentes and again in later productions including Rondallas, has been her main professional reference since then.

== Career ==
=== Beginnings and Acacias 38 (2016–2021) ===
Fernández made her television debut in Augasquentes, a comedy produced by Ficción Producciones for Televisión de Galicia and directed by Jorge Cassinello and Alfonso Zarauza, which premiered in October 2016. Headed by María Vázquez as a judge returning to her home village after twenty years, it was shot in Cuntis and at the pazo de Cibrán in Vedra; Fernández and Andrés Collantes were the two child performers in the cast.

In January 2021 she joined Acacias 38, the daily period drama on La 1, which from episode 1,403 introduced a five-year time jump into the 1920s together with a group of new residents. She played Azucena, daughter of Hortensia (Amaia Lizarralde) and niece of the established character Rosina, presented as an educated young woman with little in common with the rest of her family.

=== Film and television roles (2022–2024) ===
In 2022 Fernández appeared in Santo, a Spanish–Brazilian Netflix thriller created by Carlos López and headed by Raúl Arévalo and Bruno Gagliasso, playing Lucía, the daughter of Arévalo's character. The same month brought her first feature film, La casa entre los cactus, the directorial debut of Carlota González-Adrio, adapted by Paul Pen from his own novel. Set in the 1970s in the Canary Islands, it follows a couple played by Ariadna Gil and Daniel Grao who raise five daughters in isolation while concealing a secret; Fernández played the eldest sister, Lis.

She also worked on the Movistar Plus+ series La Unidad and Apagón, and in 2023 played Vanessa Muñoz in Mía es la venganza, a daily drama created by Aurora Guerra for Telecinco that was cancelled during its first season. In 2024 she was Elvira, one of three students who befriend the middle-aged rapper played by Julián López, in the comedy Matusalén, released on 5 April, and played Alba in El caso Asunta, the Netflix miniseries about the murder of Asunta Basterra starring Candela Peña and Tristán Ulloa, released on 26 April.

=== Rondallas and Las hijas de la criada (2025–2026) ===
In October 2025 Fernández played Elena in Entrepreneurs, a satire of Spanish start-up culture created by and starring the comedy duo Pantomima Full, whose ten-episode first season was released on Disney+ on 23 October. She then took the role of Clara Alonso Comesaña in Las hijas de la criada, a period drama adapted from the novel by Sonsoles Ónega that won the 2023 Planeta Prize. Premiered on Atresplayer on 30 November 2025, it follows the Valdés family in a Galician manor house from 1900 onwards; Fernández's character, marked from birth by a concealed event, becomes the closest ally of the matriarch played by Verónica Sánchez. The eight-episode series was directed by Menna Fité and Alejo Flah and was also scheduled for later broadcast on Antena 3.

Her first leading role in a feature film came with Rondallas, alongside Javier Gutiérrez, María Vázquez, Carlos Blanco and Tamar Novas. Set in a Galician fishing village two years after a shipwreck, the film follows the revival of the local rondalla, a traditional ensemble of strings, percussion and bagpipes; Fernández plays Andrea, a teenager whose father died in the wreck and who gradually takes the lead of the group. After festival screenings including the San Sebastián International Film Festival, it opened in Spanish cinemas on 1 January 2026 and had drawn more than 150,000 admissions by mid-January, with Fernández and her co-star Fer Fraga widely described as the breakthrough performers of the year.

At the 81st Medals of the Círculo de Escritores Cinematográficos, held on 23 February 2026 in Madrid, the Best New Actress award went to Blanca Soroa for Los domingos; Rondallas received the Medalla Platino Educa de la Solidaridad in the fiction category, which Fernández and Fraga collected on behalf of Sánchez Arévalo.

== Filmography ==
=== Film ===
Year	Title	Role	Director
2022	La casa entre los cactus	Lis	Carlota González-Adrio
2024	Matusalén	Elvira	David Galán Galindo
2025	Rondallas	Andrea	Daniel Sánchez Arévalo

=== Television ===
Year	Title	Role	Network	Notes
2016	Augasquentes	Iria	TVG	
2021	Acacias 38	Azucena Quiñonero	La 1	Seventh and final season
2022	La Unidad		Movistar Plus+	
2022	Santo	Lucía	Netflix	
2022	Apagón		Movistar Plus+	
2023	Mía es la venganza	Vanessa Muñoz	Telecinco	
2024	El caso Asunta	Alba	Netflix	Miniseries
2025	Entrepreneurs	Elena	Disney+	
2025–2026	Las hijas de la criada	Clara Alonso Comesaña	Atresplayer	Miniseries
