= Javier Bayon =

Spanish film music composer

Javier Bayon Javier Gimeno-Bayón Forteza
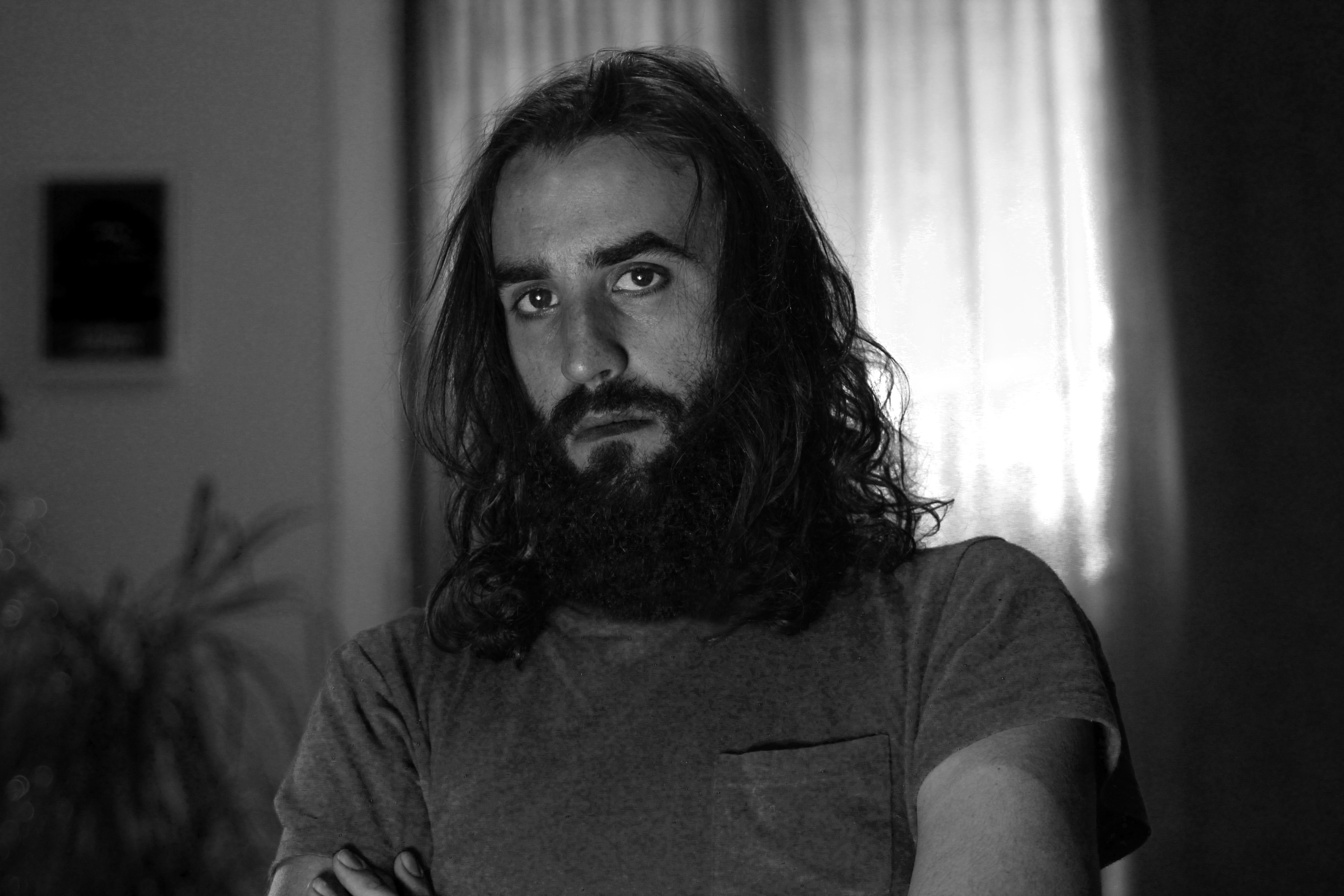

Background information
- Born: July 20, 1980 (age 44)
- Occupations: Film music composer
- Website: javierbayon.com
- Awards: Best International Film Composer Zurich Film Festival 2016

Javier Bayon (Barcelona, July 20, 1980) is a Spanish film music composer. He has scored for prestigious directors as Icíar Bollaín, Juanjo Giménez Peña, Kike Maíllo and Darren Lynn Bousman. As an orchestrator has worked for composers as Richard Band, Ludovico Einaudi, Javier Navarrete and Pharrell Williams. He took top honors at the 5th International Film Music Competition 2016, which took place within the framework of the 12th Zurich Film Festival at the Tonhalle Zürich. Bayon won the Golden Eye for Best International Film Music

== Selected filmography ==
- 2024 - One Day in Hadsel - Directed by Carl Urbini
- 2023 - Robot Dreams - Academy awards 2024 Nomination (as soundtrack producer)
- 2021 - The Innocent (Main theme) - Netflix Series - Directed by Oriol Paulo, starring Mario Casas and José Coronado
- 2019 - Te quiero, imbécil - Directed by Laura Mañá, starring Quim Gutiérrez and Ernesto Alterio
- 2018 – Welcome to Acapulco – co composed with Luc Suarez, starring Michael Madsen and Paul Sorvino
- 2017 – Dorien ( TVE1 series) – starring Macarena Gómez, Eduardo Casanova, Dafne Fernandez
- 2017 – Cuánto. Más allá del dinero – Directed by Kike Maíllo
- 2016 – Nightworld (orchestrator) – Composed by Luc Suarez, starring Robert Englund
- 2016 – Timecode (orchestrator) – Directed by Juanjo Giménez Peña
- 2014 – Angelus – Directed by Darren Lynn Bousman
- 2014 – L'Altra frontera (orchestrator) starring Ariadna Gil
- 2013 – World of Red Bull (documental – orquestrating for Pharrell Williams)
- 2012 – Hoodwink
- 2004 – Cowboy de mediodía – starring Carlos Lucas

== Awards ==
- Festival de Cine de Sitges 2015 New Visions Award / Best Original Score
- Zurich Film Festival Golden Eye 2016 / Best International Film Music
- European Cinematography Awards 2017 Jury Prize / Best Original Score
- Huetor Vega Short Film Festival 2015 / Best Music
- Los Angeles Film Awards 2017 LAFA Award / Best Score
- MedFF- Mediterranean Film Festival 2017 MedFF / Best Music Score
- Film Composer challenge award 2017 / Achievement in Film composing
- Sonar + D / 2016 Best Proposal
- American track music awards 2017 / Best Soundtrack
- Die Seriale Festival 2019 / Nomination Best Soundtrack
- JGA Jerry Goldsmith Awards 2016 / Nomination Best Music for advertisement
- Silver Screen FilmFest 2017 / Nomination Best Original Score
- Hope Film awards 2017 / Nomination Best Soundtrack
- AURORA International Film Festival 2017 / Nomination Best Music score
- Utah Film Festival and awards 2017 / Nomination Best Original Score
