= Dancing on Glass =

- Promotional release poster
- Spanish: Las niñas de cristal
- Directed by: Jota Linares
- Screenplay by: Jota Linares; Jorge Naranjo
- Produced by: Juan Solá; Nacho Manubens; Toni Sevilla; Mark Albela
- Starring: María Pedraza; Paula Losada
- Cinematography: Gris Jordana
- Edited by: Xavi G. Pereiro
- Music by: Iván Palomares
- Production company: Federation Spain
- Distributed by: Netflix
- Release dates: 25 March 2022 (Málaga); 8 April 2022 (Netflix)
- Country: Spain
- Language: Spanish

Dancing on Glass (Spanish: Las niñas de cristal, lit. 'Glass Girls') is a 2022 Spanish drama film directed by Jota Linares which stars María Pedraza and Paula Losada.

== Plot ==
The plot follows the friendship developed between two ballerinas dancing for a ballet company, as the two deal with work pressure and others' expectations.

== Cast ==
- María Pedraza as Irene
- Paula Losada as Aurora
- Marta Hazas as Pilar
- Mona Martínez as Norma
- Ana Wagener as Rosa
- Olivia Baglivi as Ruth
- Juanjo Almeida as Israel
- Fernando Delgado as Jon
- Iria del Río
- Silvia Kal
- Jota Castellano

== Production ==
The screenplay was also penned by the director Jota Linares alongside Jorge Naranjo. Produced by Federation Spain (a newly-born Spanish subsidiary of Federation Entertainment), the film began shooting in Madrid on 8 February 2021. Shooting wrapped by April 2021.

== Release ==
The film was presented on 25 March 2022 in the main competition of the 25th Málaga Film Festival. It debuted on Netflix streaming on 8 April 2022.

== Reception ==
Javier Ocaña of El País assessed that Dancing on Glass, featuring a "commendable physical and artistic work by Pedraza, and a formidable solidity in Martínez and Baglivi", is a "more than appreciable third film by a director still in his beginnings who, perhaps, has been overwhelmed by ambition in an excessively bizarre denouement".

== Accolades ==
Year	Award	Category	Nominee(s)	Result	Ref.
2023	37th Goya Awards	Best Original Score	Iván Palomares	Nominated	

== See also ==
- List of Spanish films of 2022
