= That Wasn't Me (film) =

- Film poster
- Directed by: Esteban Crespo
- Written by: Esteban Crespo
- Produced by: Esteban Crespo
- Starring: Alejandra Lorente; Gustavo Salmerón; Babou Cham
- Cinematography: Ángel Amorós
- Edited by: Vanessa Marimbert
- Music by: Juan de Dios Marfil
- Production companies: Instituto de la Cinematografía y de las Artes Audiovisuales; Prima y Vera Producciones; Producciones Africanauan S.L. Ángel Amorós Producciones
- Distributed by: Gonella Productions
- Release date: April 24, 2012 (Spain)
- Running time: 25 minutes
- Country: Spain
- Language: Spanish

That Wasn't Me (original title Aquél no era yo) is a 2012 short film by Esteban Crespo. The film had a limited release on 9 February 2012 during an event organized by the Spanish NGOs Fundación El Compromiso, Amnistía Internacional, Save The Children, Entreculturas, Alboan, ONG DYES to celebrate the International Day Against the Use of Child Soldiers.

== Plot ==
Paula and Juanjo are Spanish aid workers driving through the African countryside with their guide Conductor. At a check point they are stopped by child soldiers with machine guns demanding to see their papers. While Conductor shows the papers, Juanjo makes small talk with one of the soldiers (Kaney). Before they can get through they are stopped by the General who accuses them of kidnapping child soldiers.

An adult Kaney is seen addressing a large crowd, describing he wasn't sure if they were kidnappers or not, but that he didn't care.

The three aid workers are taken as hostages to their military compound. The General addresses the children and asks which one is brave enough to shoot the captives. One of the children opens fire, killing Conductor and injuring one of the other children. The General commends the “brave” child and then orders Kaney to kill his injured friend because he is crippled and can no longer be a soldier. While initially reluctant, Kaney kills his friends, despite the captives and his friend begging him not to.

An adult Kaney explains to the crowd that in his culture family is very important, and while the soldiers are like his brothers, the General is like his father, and so he always obeyed him.

Juanjo is also killed, leaving Paula the only remaining captive. Teniente handcuffs himself to Paula and rapes her while Kaney stands guard. The assault is interrupted by an attack on the compound. Paula hides while the entire camp is wiped out by the military. After the attack, Paula runs past the dead bodies of the fallen children to an abandoned jeep. Before she can get away, she sees that Kaney is still alive. After a moment's hesitation she grabs a gun of a fallen soldier and runs after him. She handcuffs herself to Kaney and at gun point she takes him back to the jeep. Together they drive from compound.

They reach a fork in the road and Paula, still holding the gun and shaking with tears, demands that Kaney tell her the way to town. Kamey is calm and refuses to tell her. Paula, still crying says she's going to take him to a place with a real bed, and new friends, but he needs to tell her where to go.

Paula tells Kaney she won't be able to protect him if they are found by the army. Kaney calmly says that if his people find him he will make sure that Paula “has really good time.” Paula, through tears, shoots Kaney in the leg, Kaney screams in pain while Paula shouts, “What’s going to happen to you now! You’re a cripple now!”

The film ends with adult Kaney ending his speech to the crowd. The audience applauds and the final shot is Paula in the audience, crying and applauding his speech.

== Cast ==
- Alejandra Lorente as Paula
- Gustavo Salmerón as Juanjo
- Jose Maria Chumo as Conductor
- Alita Rodgers Jr. as Teniente
- Juan Tojaka as Kaney as a child
- Babou Cham as General
- Mariano Nguema as Kaney as an adult

== Awards ==
Awards
Award	Date of ceremony	Category	Recipients and nominees	Result
Academy Award	March 2, 2014	Best Live Action Short Film	Esteban Crespo	Nominated
27th Goya Awards	February 17, 2013	Best Fictional Short Film	Esteban Crespo	Won
