= The Girl in the Mirror =

TV series

- Spanish: Alma
- Genre: Supernatural thriller; Horror
- Created by: Sergio G. Sánchez
- Written by: Sergio G. Sánchez; Teresa de Rosendo; Paul Pen
- Directed by: Sergio G. Sánchez; Kike Maíllo
- Starring: Mireia Oriol; Álex Villazán; Pol Monen; Claudia Roset; Javier Morgade; Nil Cardoner; María Caballero; Milena Smit; Elena Irureta
- Country of origin: Spain
- Original language: Spanish
- No. of episodes: 9

Production
- Running time: 41–60 min.
- Production company: Sospecha Films

Original release
- Network: Netflix
- Release: 19 August 2022

The Girl in the Mirror (Spanish: Alma) is a Spanish supernatural thriller horror television series created by Sergio G. Sánchez for Netflix that premiered on 19 August 2022. The cast, led by Mireia Oriol, also features Álex Villazán, Pol Monen, Claudia Roset, Javier Morgade, Nil Cardoner, María Caballero, Milena Smit and Elena Irureta, among others.

== Premise ==
Following a bus crash, Alma—one of only a few survivors of the accident—wakes up in a hospital suffering from amnesia. Disoriented and traumatized, she tries to unravel the mystery behind the accident.

== Cast ==
- Mireia Oriol as Alma and Lara
- Álex Villazán as Tom
- Pol Monen as Bruno
- Claudia Roset as Deva
- Javier Morgade as Martín
- Nil Cardoner as Roque
- María Caballero as Diana
- Milena Smit as Nico
- Elena Irureta as Aurora
- Marta Belaustegui as Pilar
- Josean Bengoetxea as Roman
- Cándido Uranga as Efren
- Katia R. Borlado as Berta
- Ximena Vera as Lucia
- Celia Sastre as Laura
- Laura Ubach as Telma
- Raúl Tejón as Ricardo
- Alejandro Serrano as Alex

== Production ==
Netflix ordered the series in late 2018. Created by Sergio G. Sánchez, the screenplay was written by Sánchez alongside Teresa de Rosendo and Paul Pen, with Sánchez and Kike Maíllo directing. Produced by Sospecha Films for Netflix, shooting started in September 2020, taking place in different locations in Asturias, including Llanes, as well as in Manresa, Catalonia.

== Release ==
The series premiered on 19 August 2022 on Netflix.

== Episodes ==
| No. | Title | Original release date |
|---|---|---|
| 1 | "Niebla" ("Fog") | 19 August 2022 |
| 2 | "Secretos" ("Secrets") | 19 August 2022 |
| 3 | "Búsqueda" ("Searching") | 19 August 2022 |
| 4 | "Sombras" ("Shadows") | 19 August 2022 |
| 5 | "Lara" ("Lara") | 19 August 2022 |
| 6 | "Revelaciones" ("Revelations") | 19 August 2022 |
| 7 | "Umbrales" ("Thresholds") | 19 August 2022 |
| 8 | "Deva" ("Deva") | 19 August 2022 |
| 9 | "Regreso" ("Return") | 19 August 2022 |
