= Awareness (film) =

2023 film by Daniel Benmayor

- Release poster
- Directed by: Daniel Benmayor
- Screenplay by: Daniel Benmayor; Iván Ledesma; Manuel Burque
- Starring: Carlos Scholz; María Pedraza; Pedro Alonso; Lela Loren; Óscar Jaenada
- Cinematography: Juan Miguel Azpiroz
- Edited by: Marc Soria
- Music by: Roque Baños
- Production companies: Federation Spain; Amazon Studios; Dbemna Content
- Distributed by: Amazon Prime Video
- Release dates: 16 March 2023 (Málaga); 11 October 2023 (Prime Video)
- Countries: Spain; United States
- Language: Spanish

Awareness is a 2023 Spanish-American science-fiction action thriller film directed by Daniel Benmayor, who also co-wrote the screenplay with Iván Ledesma, and Manuel Burque. It stars Carlos Scholz alongside María Pedraza, Pedro Alonso, Lela Loren, and Óscar Jaenada.

== Plot ==
Ian is a teenage rebel who lives with his dad on the margins of society. They survive on small scams thanks to Ian's extraordinary ability to project visual illusion into the minds of others. After losing control over his powers in public, a mysterious secret agency begins to pursue him. While fleeing from them, Ian will discover that he is not the only one with the ability to project visual illusions and that his entire life has been a lie.

== Cast ==
- Carlos Scholz as Ian
- Pedro Alonso as Vicente
- María Pedraza as Esther
- Lela Loren as Adriana
- Óscar Jaenada as Perceptor
- Silvia Kal as Cajera Banco
- Luis Zahera as a doctor
- James Faulkner as El Americano

== Production ==
The screenplay was penned by Daniel Benmayor alongside Iván Ledesma and Manuel Burque. The film is a Spanish-US co-production by Federation Spain, Amazon Studios, and Dbenma Content. Shooting locations included Catalonia, Madrid, and Castile and León. The film was scored by Roque Baños.

== Release ==
Awareness was presented at the 26th Málaga Film Festival on 16 March 2023, screened within the non-competitive 'Málaga Premiere' film slate. Amazon Prime Video released the film on 11 October 2023.

== Reception ==
According to the American review aggregation website Rotten Tomatoes, Awareness has a 13% approval rating based on 8 reviews from critics, with an average rating of 4.80/10.

Enid Román Almansa of Cinemanía rated the film 2 out of 5 stars, writing that the "result of Awareness is too flat to become an intriguing title".

Raquel Hernández Luján of HobbyConsolas rated the film with 62 points ('acceptable'), citing "the powerful cinematographic ideas, good action choreography and great intentions" as positive elements, while noting how the acting performances are not [precisely] the film's strongest point, and the film's lack of naturalness as elements bringing the film down.

== See also ==
- List of Spanish films of 2023
