= Silvia Kal =

Spanish actress and model

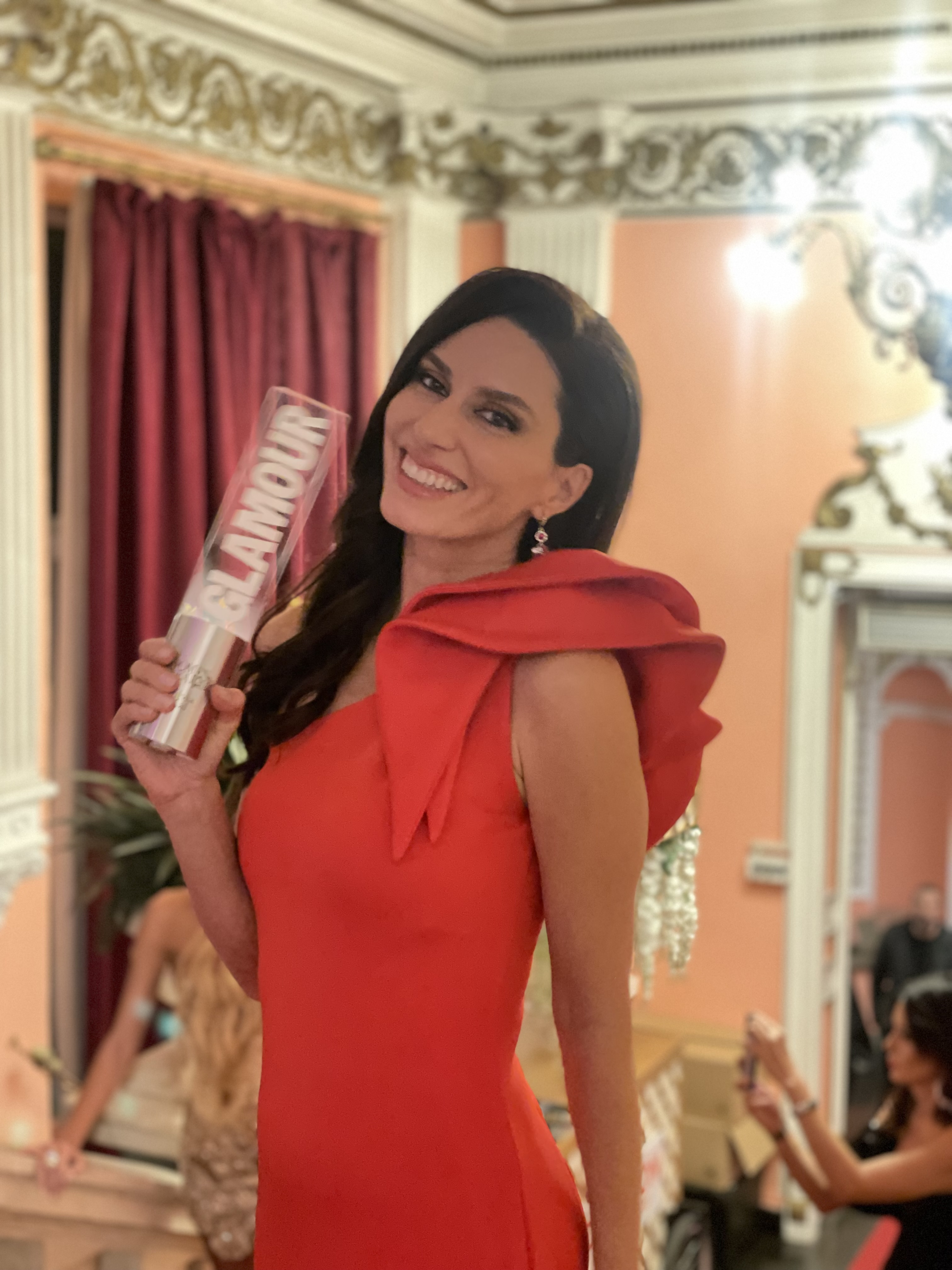
- Born: January 5, 1983 (age 43); Madrid, Spain
- Education: European University of Madrid
- Occupations: Actor, model
- Years active: 2006–present
- Notable work: Goya's Ghosts

Silvia Kal (Madrid, January 5, 1983) is a Spanish Actor and model based in the United States. She has participated in advertising campaigns for brands like Google, Sony and Natura Bissé and has appeared in magazines like GQ, Esquire, Maxim, Vogue and Men's Health. She began her acting career in 2006 participating in the film Goya's Ghosts by Miloš Forman.

== Biography ==
=== Early years ===
Kal was born in Madrid in 1983. After studying at the European University of Madrid, she began working as a model and actress, making her film debut in Miloš Forman feature film Goya's Ghosts, a 2006 Spanish-American production starring Javier Bardem, Stellan Skarsgård and Natalie Portman. In 2010, Kal decided to move to Los Angeles to continue her acting career there.

=== Career ===
In the United States she enrolled at the Ivana Chubbuck Studio to study drama and began to appear in minor roles in films like Martin Scorsese's The Wolf of Wall Street and Clint Eastwood's Jersey Boys, and in television series such as Melodía de amor and Anger Management. In 2016 Kal played Catarina in Walt Perez feature film Here in the East and the same year she starred in the live action trailer for Mobile Strike, a strategy video game with Arnold Schwarzenegger as the main character. In 2017 she played Kate White in the TV series Scorpion Girl and participated in the feature film Caravaggio and My Mother the Pope, directed by Gladys Florence.

After appearing in the TV series Crypto Game and in the 2019 thriller Chameleon, she wrote the story for the short film Breathe Jans, Breathe, which is currently in post-production. In 2021, her presence was confirmed in the Spanish feature film Las niñas de cristal, directed by Jota Linares.

In her career as a model, she has participated in advertising campaigns for brands such as Swim by Judit, Google, Natura Bissé and Sony, and has appeared in magazines such as GQ, Esquire, Maxim, Vogue, Elle and Men's Health. In 2013 Kal appeared in the music video "Let the Bass Go" by Snoop Dogg, for the soundtrack of the animated film Turbo. In 2017 she collaborated with Spanish singer David Bisbal in the music video for the song "Fiebre", one of the singles from his album Hijos del mar.

In 2022, she played the role of Laura in the Spanish film Dancing on Glass. In 2023 she appeared in the film Awareness, on the Prime Video platform.

== Filmography ==
=== Film ===
Year	Title	Role	Notes
2006	Goya's Ghosts	Queen	
2011	Sprinkles: The Mighty Mermen from Mars	Grace	Short film
2013	The Wolf of Wall Street	Party attendee	
2014	Jersey Boys	Producer's wife	
2015	Paranormal Digital Portrait Zombie Halloween Prank	Woman	Short film
2016	Here in the East	Catarina	
2016	Mobile Strike Live Action Trailer	Soldier	Short film
2016	The Last Wizard	Tiffany	Short film
2017	Caravaggio and My Mother the Pope	Picasso's model	
2018	Goosebumps Horror Town: A Babysitter's Nightmare	Sarah	
2019	Chamaleon	Olivia	
2020	Scorpion Girl: The Awakening	Journalist	
2021	Breathe Jans, Breathe	Jans	Short film, also writer
2022	Dancing on Glass	Laura	
2023	Awareness	Lucía	
TBA	Who Lives Last	Gaby	Pre-production
TBA	Love in the Times of Coronavirus	Isabella	Pre-production
TBA	Perfect Liars ( Perfectos Mentirosos)		Post-production

=== Television ===
Year	Title	Role	Notes
2011	Melodía de amor	Isabel	Recurring role
2013	Anger Management	Beautiful woman	1 episode
2017	Scorpion Girl	Kate White	Recurring role
2018	Crypto Game	Verena	2 episodes

=== Video ===
Year	Title	Artist
2013	«Let the Bass Go»	Snoop Dogg
2017	«Fiebre»	David Bisbal
