= Band Together (film) =

- Theatrical release poster
- Spanish: Rondallas
- Directed by: Daniel Sánchez Arévalo
- Written by: Daniel Sánchez Arévalo
- Produced by: Ramón Campos
- Starring: Javier Gutiérrez; María Vázquez; Judith Fernández; Tamar Novas; Carlos Blanco; Fer Fraga; Xosé A. Touriñán; Marta Larralde
- Cinematography: Rafa García
- Edited by: Miguel Sanz
- Music by: Federico Jusid
- Production companies: Mister Fields and Friends; Bambú Producciones; Rondallas Movie AIE
- Distributed by: Beta Fiction Spain
- Release dates: 23 September 2025 (Zinemaldia); 1 January 2026 (Spain)
- Country: Spain
- Language: Spanish

Band Together (Spanish: Rondallas) is a 2025 Spanish comedy-drama film written and directed by Daniel Sánchez Arévalo. Its ensemble cast includes Javier Gutiérrez, María Vázquez, Judith Fernández, and Tamar Novas.

The film premiered at the 73rd San Sebastián International Film Festival on 23 September 2025 ahead of its 1 January 2026 theatrical rollout in Spain by Beta Fiction Spain.

== Plot ==
After a tragedy in the sea, inhabitants of a Galician fishing village rehearse a rondalla performance to compete against other neighbouring villages and heal themselves.

== Cast ==
- Javier Gutiérrez as Luis
- María Vázquez as Carmen
- Judith Fernández as Andrea
- Tamar Novas as Xoel
- Carlos Blanco as Yayo
- Fer Fraga as Elías
- Xosé A. Touriñán
- Marta Larralde
- Lola López Rodríguez

== Production ==
The film is a Mister Fields and Friends, Bambú Producciones, and Rondallas Movie AIE production, with the participation of Movistar Plus+, RTVE, TVG and backing from ICAA. It was shot in locations of the province of Pontevedra, primarily A Guarda and Tui, but also Baiona, Oia, and Vigo, including in IFEVI and the University of Vigo.

== Release ==
Band Together was presented at the 73rd San Sebastián International Film Festival on 23 September 2025. Distributed by Beta Fiction Spain, the film is scheduled to be released theatrically in Spain on 1 January 2026.

== Reception ==
Andrea G. Bermejo of Cinemanía rated Band Together 4 out of 5 stars, assessing how Sánchez Arévalo delivers his best attempt yet at adhering to the standards of the feel-good movie, also welcoming how he manages to make us grow fond of all the characters of the ensemble film without neglecting each of their storylines.

Luis Martínez of El Mundo rated the film 4 out of 5 stars writing that "it is essentially popular cinema. And it is so without condescension, without false modesty, without prejudice, and in a way that could even be described as slightly arrogant".

== Accolades ==
Year	Award	Category	Nominee(s)	Result	Ref.
2026	13th Feroz Awards	Best Comedy Film		Nominated	
2026	81st CEC Medals	Best New Actress	Judith Fernández	Nominated	
2026	81st CEC Medals	Best New Actor	Fer Fraga	Nominated	
2026	40th Goya Awards	Best Supporting Actor	Tamar Novas	Nominated	

== See also ==
- List of Spanish films of 2026
