= Jaime Brunet International Prize =

- Description: Promotion of human rights and elimination of inhumane treatment
- Country: Spain
- Presented by: Jaime Brunet Foundation (Public University of Navarre)
- Rewards: €36,000, diploma, and sculpture
- Website: www.unavarra.es/fundacionjaimebrunet/

The Jaime Brunet International Prize was established in 1998 with the objective of distinguishing people, organizations and institutions that promote the defence of human rights. It is awarded by the Jaime Brunet Foundation of the UPNA (Public University of Navarre). This award also aims to recognize the work of those who fight to eliminate situations of inhumane or degrading treatment in violation of people's inherent rights to dignity. The prize consists of a diploma, a sculpture commemorating the award and €36,000 in cash.

== Jaime Brunet Romero ==
Jaime Brunet Romero (born July 20, 1926) was of a family that settled in Guipúzcoa in the 18th century. He studied law at the University of Valladolid, where he would later serve as assistant professor. Through his travels, he came to understand the extent of discrimination, violence and abuse committed by the powerful affecting the weak, and how people's most basic rights were infringed every day. He used his fortune to create a foundation that, after his death, would be dedicated to promoting human rights. Brunet died on January 4, 1992, in San Sebastián (Guipúzcoa, Spain).

== The Jaime Brunet Romero Foundation ==
The headquarters of the Jaime Brunet Romero Foundation are in the Public University of Navarre. It is a permanent, private cultural foundation dedicated to projects of social interest. Through its activities, it promotes respect for human dignity and the elimination of inhumane or degrading situations or treatment. In addition to the Jaime Brunet International Prize, the Jaime Brunet University Prize has been awarded since 2014 to highlight research pursuing such issues. Additionally, since 2017 the Brunet Doctoral Thesis Award has been granted to give recognition to theses with research content directly related to the defense and promotion of human rights.

== Prize winners ==
- 1998, Amnesty International
- 1999, Akin Birdal
- 2000, Cristina Cuesta Gorostidi
- 2001, Dalai Lama
- 2002, Cecilio de Lora and Carolina Agudelo
- 2003, Tim Modise
- 2004, Manos Unidas
- 2005, Mercedes Navarro
- 2006, José María Caballero and El Compromiso Foundation
- 2007, Jon Cortina Garaigorta
- 2008, Jürgen Habermas
- 2010, Yoani María Sánchez
- 2011, Peace Brigades International
- 2012, Natty Petrosino
- 2013, International Committee of the Red Cross
- 2014, Gervasio Sánchez
- 2015, Thelma Esperanza Aldana Hernández
- 2016, Reprieve
- 2017, Vicente Ferrer Foundation
- 2018 (not granted)
- 2019, United Nations High Commissioner for Refugees ACNUR
- 2020, El papa Francisco
- 2022, Philip Obaji
- 2023, Fundación Fontilles
- 2024, World Central Kitchen
- 2025, Federación SETEM (SETEM Federation)
