= The House Among the Cactuses =

- Theatrical release poster
- Spanish: La casa entre los cactus
- Directed by: Carlota González-Adrio
- Screenplay by: Paul Pen
- Based on: La casa entre los cactus by Paul Pen
- Starring: Ariadna Gil; Daniel Grao; Ricardo Gómez; Aina Picarolo; Zoe Arnao; Anna Ruiz; Carla Ruiz
- Cinematography: Kiko de la Rica
- Music by: Zeltia Montes
- Production companies: Cine365 Films; DZ Largometrajes y Audiovisuales AIE; Ikiru Films; La Terraza Films; Virtual Contenidos
- Distributed by: Filmax
- Release dates: 12 September 2022 (Renoir Princesa); 16 September 2022 (Spain)
- Country: Spain
- Language: Spanish

The House Among the Cactuses (Spanish: La casa entre los cactus) is a 2022 Spanish psychological thriller film directed by Carlota González-Adrio in her feature debut and written by Paul Pen. It is an adaptation of the latter's novel of the same name. It stars Ariadna Gil, Daniel Grao, and Ricardo Gómez.

== Plot ==
The plot concerns the arrival of (and ensuing disruption caused by) a stranger (Rafa) to an idyllic community of cacti-growing people living in a remote valley and hiding a secret. The aforementioned community is formed by Rosa, Emilio and their daughters, all of them named after flowers (Lis, Iris, Melisa, Lila and Dalia).

== Cast ==
- Ariadna Gil as Rosa
- Daniel Grao as Emilio
- Ricardo Gómez as Rafa
- Aina Picarolo as Iris
- Zoe Arnao as Melisa
- Anna Ruiz
- Carla Ruiz
- Judith Fernández a Lis
- Marga Arnau as Mila

== Production ==
The film is a Cine365 Films, DZ Largometrajes y Audiovisuales AIE, Ikiru Films, La Terraza Films and Virtual Contenidos production, with the participation or association of RTVE, TV3, Orange TV and ICAA. It was shot on locations of Gran Canaria, including Arucas, Firgas, Valleseco, and Las Palmas. Filmax nabbed the film's distribution rights in post-production.

== Release ==
The film was slated to have a pre-screening at Madrid's Cines Renoir Princesa on 12 September 2022. It was theatrically released in Spain on 16 September 2022. It was also selected for screening in the 'Made in Spain' slate of the 70th San Sebastián International Film Festival.

== Reception ==
Toni Vall of Cinemanía rated the film 3½ out of 5 stars, conceptualizing it as a symbiosis of Captain Fantastic and The Beguiled.

Blai Morell of Fotogramas rated it 3 out of 5 stars, highlighting the children cast and the "unhealthy atmosphere that transpires".

== Accolades ==
Year	Award	Category	Nominee(s)	Result	Ref.
2023	15th Gaudí Awards	Best New Director	Carlota González-Adrio	Nominated	

== See also ==
- List of Spanish films of 2022

== See also ==
- The House Among the Cactuses at ICAA's Catálogo de Cinespañol
