= The Warning (2018 film) =

- Film poster
- Spanish: El Aviso
- Directed by: Daniel Calparsoro
- Screenplay by: Chris Sparling
- Adaptation by: Patxi Amezcua
- Based on: A screenplay by Jorge Guerricaechevarría; El Aviso by Paul Pen
- Produced by: Pedro Uriol
- Starring: Raúl Arévalo; Hugo Arbués; Belén Cuesta; Aitor Luna; Aura Garrido; Antonio Dechent; Sergio Mur; Patricia Vico; Antonio Durán; Luis Callejo; Máximo Pastor; Paula Monterrubio; Eva Llorach
- Cinematography: Sergi Vilanova
- Music by: Julio de la Rosa
- Production company: Morena Films
- Distributed by: Netflix
- Release date: February 24, 2018 (Donostia premiere)
- Running time: 92 minutes
- Country: Spain
- Language: Spanish

The Warning (Spanish: El Aviso) is a 2018 Spanish thriller film directed by Daniel Calparsoro and based on the novel of the same name by Paul Pen. The screenplay was adapted by Jorge Guerricaechevarría and Chris Sparling. It was produced by Morena Films.

The Warning was shown at the 2018 Miami International Film Festival and premiered on Netflix in July 2018. The film received mixed reviews from critics.

== Plot ==
In April 2018, 9-year-old Nico is tormented by bullies who force him to steal an X-rated magazine from a 24-hour convenience store and tell him about a man who was shot and killed there 10 years earlier. Nico is caught shoplifting by the owner, Héctor, who realizes the magazine is not for such a young boy. Héctor does not tell Nico's mother and Nico instead buys a video game magazine. Later, Nico discovers a note inside the magazine saying he must not go to the store on his birthday, April 12, or else he will be killed. His mother reports her suspicions about the bullies having written the note to Nico's school principal which then results in further retaliation.

On April 2, 2008, Jon picks up his best friend, David, who reveals he plans to propose that weekend to his girlfriend, Andrea. At Andrea's behest, the pair stop to purchase ice at the same store before heading home. Jon waits in his car while David steps inside and is subsequently shot in a failed murder attempt. As David falls into a coma, Jon, a mathematician suffering from schizophrenia, stops taking his risperidone. He discovers three previous violent incidents at the store's location with an unusual pattern. Except for David's shooting, each incident occurred on April 12 with five people present: a 10-year-old boy and four others aged 21, 32, 42, and 53 years old.

The first incident was a botched bank robbery by Ezequiel González when the location housed the Crédito Agrícola in 1913. Jon finds Ezequiel's elderly daughter, who reveals her father was desperate for money to pay for medical treatment as she contracted an illness from Ezequiel upon his return from the war in Africa. After being denied a loan, an armed Ezequiel returned and killed the manager when he pulled out a gun. Ezequiel, who suffered from PTSD from the war, was triggered by people screaming and shot three more people before killing himself.

In 1955, exactly 42 years later, the 42-year-old owner of an inn at the location was murdered by her ex-lover in front of her 10-year-old son. Then, 21 years later in 1976, members of the Basque separatist group ETA attempted to assassinate an Army general at the same location. The general survived, but his 21-year-old guard died protecting a 10-year-old boy.

Jon tells Andrea and David's brother about the pattern, but they blame his schizophrenia as he admits to stopping his medication. Andrea accuses him of being paranoid because his birthday is on April 12, when he will turn 32. When David is declared brain dead with only a one-in-a-million chance of regaining consciousness, his family decides to pull the plug on April 12 much to Andrea's anguish. Jon later tells Andrea his theory that Ezequiel is being reincarnated and killed on the same spot, and that based on the sequence, a 10-year-old boy will be the final one killed. Andrea becomes enraged, revealing she blames herself for asking Jon to pick up the ice and Jon for allowing David to go inside.

At the hospital, Andrea and David's family share their final farewells before the life support is terminated. After David's life support is disconnected, Jon runs to the maternity ward, shouting to the parents of a newborn their son must not go to the convenience store on his 10th birthday or else he will die. Jon is subdued by hospital staff but escapes and returns to the convenience store, where he gets a call from Andrea that David has miraculously regained consciousness. Jon immediately realizes that he is the one who must die. He writes down the warning Nico received earlier in the film and gives it to Héctor, the owner while wearing a video game T-shirt. Jon begs Héctor to pass the warning onto any boy who reminds him of Jon ten years later. Jon then insists another customer is going to attempt a robbery which causes Héctor to call the police and ultimately pull out his gun. In a moment of distraction, Jon wrests the gun away from Héctor and forces Héctor, the man and a boy to go outside. In the distance, a police siren can be heard heading to the store's location.

In 2018, Nico learns another boy got the same warning not to go to the store, but it happened at the hospital the day he was born. When Lucía asks the boy's father, he denies it. Lucía is convinced her son is being pranked and insists he go to the store to conquer his fears once and for all. She gives him money and waits outside. As Nico waits inside, a man pulls out a gun and demands money from the register. Héctor is absent, but a younger man working there pulls out a gun in response. Nico looks up in the convex mirror to see Jon from 2008, waving the gun outside the store, while Jon sees in the mirror the image of Nico in 2018. In the mirror, Jon screams at Nico over and over to run, and Nico runs to safety just as bullets fly. Outside, he tells his mother he was not afraid.

Finally flashing back to 2008, the police officer shoots and wounds Jon. Jon witnesses Nico surviving and dies shortly after Andrea and David's brother arrive. After his death, Nico is born.

== Cast ==
- Raúl Arévalo as Jon, mathematician
- Hugo Arbúes as Nico, schoolboy
- Belén Cuesta as Andrea, David's girlfriend
- Aitor Luna as Pablo, David's brother
- Aura Garrido as Lucía, Nico's mother
- Antonio Dechent as Héctor, convenience store owner
- Sergio Mur as David, Jon's best friend
- Luis Callejo as Lisandro
- Julieta Serrano as Asunción, daughter of 1913 bank robber
- Máximo Pastor as Diego

== Reception ==
On Rotten Tomatoes, the film has an approval rating of 50% based on 14 reviews.

Jonathan Holland of The Hollywood Reporter gave a negative review, writing, "As a director, Calparsoro has repeatedly promised to deliver something special, but has never quite delivered: The Warning, whose final third makes logical sense, but relies too heavily on unlikely coincidence, continues that trend."

In Forbes, Travis DeShong summarized the film as disappointing, writing, "The only thing worse than a bad film is a disappointing one. Nothing stings quite like a film failing to deliver on its premise, especially if that premise shows promise. Spanish director Daniel Calparsoro's thriller, The Warning (El Aviso), an adaptation of the novel by Paul Pen, is capably assembled but doesn't fulfill its own potential, betraying glimpses of a richer story than the one we actually get."

Jordi Costa of Spanish newspaper El País (Spain) compared the film to episodes of Lost criticized the storyline, writing, "Calparsoro puts his professionalism at the service of a story that does not create enough belief in the improbable so that the viewer is imbued with the mystery. It leaves the impression that even a good part of the cast has serious difficulties in believing in this story."

Joe Reid of Decider.com gave the film a more positive review, writing, "A well-acted and surprisingly affecting thriller, all things considered, and a satisfying mystery, if not a shocking one."
