= Ego (2021 film) =

- Theatrical release poster
- Directed by: Alfonso Cortés-Cavanillas
- Written by: Jorge Navarro de Lemus
- Produced by: Aníbal Ruiz-Villar
- Starring: María Pedraza; Marian Álvarez; Pol Monen; Alicia Borrachero
- Cinematography: Pedro Vendrell Martínez
- Production company: La Caña Brothers
- Distributed by: Begin Again Films
- Release dates: October 2021 (BHFF); 1 December 2021 (Spain)
- Country: Spain
- Language: Spanish

Ego is a 2021 Spanish psychological horror thriller film directed by Alfonso Cortés-Cavanillas which stars María Pedraza.

== Plot ==
The film is set during the COVID-19 lockdown in Spain. Paloma begins using a dating website for same-sex females, for some fun. She is surprised to find on the website the profile of another girl identical to her, who threatens to replace Paloma and erase her identity.

== Cast ==
- María Pedraza as Paloma / Goliadkin.
- Marian Álvarez, as Paloma's mother.
- Pol Monen as Jorge.
- Alicia Borrachero as Paloma's psychiatrist.

== Production ==
Produced by La Caña Films, the film was written by Jorge Navarro de Lemus and directed by Alfonso Cortés-Cavanillas. Pedro Vendrell Martínez was responsible for the cinematography.

== Release ==
The film was screened at the Brooklyn Horror Film Festival held in October 2021. Distributed by Begin Again Films, it was theatrically released in Spain on 1 December 2021.

== Awards and nominations ==
Year	Award	Category	Nominee(s)	Result	Ref.
2021	Brooklyn Horror Film Festival	Best Feature Film		Won	
2021	Brooklyn Horror Film Festival	Best Screenplay		Won	
2021	Brooklyn Horror Film Festival	Best Actress	María Pedraza	Won	

== See also ==
- List of Spanish films of 2021
