= Who Would You Take to a Deserted Island? =

2019 Spanish drama film

- Film poster
- Spanish: ¿A quién te llevarías a una isla desierta?
- Directed by: Jota Linares
- Written by: Paco Anaya; Jota Linares (play)
- Starring: Pol Monen; Jaime Lorente; Andrea Ros; María Pedraza
- Release dates: 22 March 2019 (Málaga); 12 April 2019 (Netflix)
- Country: Spain
- Language: Spanish

Who Would You Take to a Deserted Island? (Spanish: ¿A quién te llevarías a una isla desierta?) is a 2019 Spanish drama film directed by Jota Linares.

== Cast ==
- Pol Monen as Eze
- Jaime Lorente as Marcos
- Andrea Ros as Celeste
- María Pedraza as Marta
- Beatriz Arjona as Maggie

== Release ==
The film screened in competition at the 22nd Málaga Film Festival on 22 March 2019.

== Awards ==
Pol Monen won, for his role as Eze, the 2019 Premio Orden de Toledo for Best New Actor at the Festival Internacional de Cine y la Palabra (CiBRA).

== See also ==
- List of Spanish films of 2019
