= La Reina del Sur season 2 =

La Reina del Sur
- Season 2
- Promotional poster
- Starring: Kate del Castillo; Raoul Bova; Paola Núñez; Mark Tacher; Flavio Medina; Luisa Gavasa; Antonio Gil
- No. of episodes: 60

Release
- Original network: Telemundo
- Original release: 22 April – 29 July 2019

Season chronology
- Next → Season 3

The second season of the American drama television series La Reina del Sur was announced by Telemundo on 11 May 2017. The season based on the original work of Arturo Pérez-Reverte is adapted for television by Roberto Stopello. Filming officially began in April 2018 in Tuscany, Italy. The season premiered on 22 April 2019 and ended on 29 July 2019.

== Plot ==
The season revolves around Teresa Mendoza nine years after the events of the first season. Hidden from the rest of the world, Teresa now lives an idyllic existence in Italian Tuscany, but the kidnapping of her daughter forces her to reintroduce herself into the underworld of drug trafficking and once again confront her old enemies and the past she tried to leave behind.

== Production ==
The series initially filmed in Italy, but much of the production took place in Colombia, because Kate del Castillo could not return to Mexico. The series also filmed in places such as Moscow, Russia, Bucharest, Romania, Massa Marittima, and Málaga, Spain. In addition to the return of Del Castillo, Alejandro Calva and Eduardo Velasco, new actors joined the series including as Aitor Luna, Jesús Castro, and Eduardo Yáñez. According to Stopello, the season begins eight years after Teresa's disappearance. The cast was revealed on 29 November 2018.

The title of the first episode "El regreso de la Reina" was revealed by Del Castillo through her Instagram account. A total of 60 episodes have been confirmed for this season.

== Cast ==
- Kate del Castillo as Teresa Mendoza
- Raoul Bova as Francesco Belmondo
- Paola Núñez as Manuela
- Mark Tacher as Alejandro Alcalá
- Flavio Medina as Zurdo Villa
- Luisa Gavasa as Cayetana Segovia
- Antonio Gil as Oleg Yosikov
- Alejandro Calva as César Güemes "Batman"
- Kika Edgar as Genoveva Alcalá
- Lincoln Palomeque as Faustino Sánchez Godoy
- Patricia Reyes Spíndola as Carmen Martínez
- Carmen Flores Sandoval as Charo
- Emannuel Orenday as Danilo Márquez
- Alejandro Speitzer as Ray Dávila
- Christian Tappan as Willy Rangel
- Tiago Correa as Jonathan Peres
- Cuca Escribano as Sheila
- Carmen Navarro as Marcela / La Conejo
- Miguel Ángel Blanco as Siso Pernas
- Eduardo Velasco as Coronel Abdelkader Chaib
- Sara Vidorreta as Rocío Aljarafe
- Agata Clares as Paloma Aljarafe
- Juan José Arjona as Pablo Flores
- Abdelali el Aziz as Ahmed
- Isabella Sierra as Sofía Dantes
- Humberto Zurita as Epifanio Vargas
- Jesús Castro as Jesús
- Pol Monen as Juan
- Eduardo Yáñez as Antonio Alcalá
- Aitor Luna as Pedro
- Eduardo Santamarina as Mariano Bravo
- Eric Roberts as Erick Sheldon
- María Camila Giraldo as Jimena Montes
- Vera Mercado as Virginia Vargas
- Norma Angélica as Morgana
- Eduardo Pérez as Sergio
- Dimitry Anisimov as Anton
- Aroha Hafez as Triana
- Anna Ciocchetti as Marietta Lancaster
- Roberto Abraham Wohlmuth as Lencho

== Episodes ==
No. overall	No. in season	Title	Original release date	Viewers (millions)
64	1	"El regreso de la Reina"	22 April 2019	2.36
Eight years later, Teresa Mendoza takes out her claws since her daughter Sofía has been kidnapped. Meanwhile, Cayetana, Teo's mother, savors revenge in the midst of her enemy's pain.
65	2	"Cuando es mala es mucho mejor"	23 April 2019	2.09
Teresa is infuriated with Epifanio's proposal and refuses to accept it but her godfather has her against the wall with no way out. Cayetana negotiates with the Gallegos to finish off Teresa.
66	3	"Canta y no llores"	24 April 2019	2.26
The Pernas take their toll on Teresa while Epifanio asks Francesco for to take care of Sofía - for a price. Agents of the DEA tremble at the sound of a bomb.
67	4	"De regreso a España"	26 April 2019	1.84
Upon arrival in Málaga, Teresa goes to the appointment with her friend Oleg but another less friendly Russian, awaits her. Commissioner Flores already knows that Teresa is in Málaga and is going to stop her.
68	5	"La hora de los Pernas"	29 April 2019	2.21
The Gallegos corner Teresa. Although she manages to escape, Siso and his cousins capture her and the news of her suffering runs like wildfire.
69	6	"Las matadoras al ruedo"	30 April 2019	2.07
Like a beast, Cayetana meets her maximum enemy in the bullring. Teo's mother discovers that she has a third granddaughter and at that moment the police arrive and corner Teresa.
70	7	"Al fin Moscú"	1 May 2019	2.04
Time is running out, so Teresa looks desperately for Oleg and knows that he can be her salvation if she wants to see her daughter alive. In the ranch of Zurdo Villa, Sánchez Godoy discovers a secret.
71	8	"Por un huevo de Fabergé"	2 May 2019	2.02
A valuable piece in an antique shop is the most powerful clue that Teresa has to approach her ally. Willy and Jonathan know something is wrong.
72	9	"Señor presidente"	3 May 2019	1.87
At the exit of the Kremlin, Oleg shares with Teresa the overwhelming response of the Russian leader. While they advance in the car, they turn aside towards a rural road with no way out.
73	10	"Adiós Moscú"	6 May 2019	1.95
The agents of the KGB kill one of Teresa's companions but for her, dying is not an option and she starts her trip to the border. In Mexico, Epifanio tries to negotiate with his wife.
74	11	"Bienvenida a Ucrania"	7 May 2019	1.87
Oleg and Teresa flee to Ukraine, but they have an accident and lose part of their wealth. In Spain, Juanito forces Paloma to have sex, she resists, but he dominates her.
75	12	"La videollamada"	8 May 2019	1.90
Sofía manipulates Batman and calls her mother. She takes the opportunity to show her her drawing and send a message in code to her mother. Teresa is shocked with what she sees.
76	13	"Las sospechas"	9 May 2019	1.80
Teresa analyzes Sofía's drawing. Lupo, wolf in Italian, seems to be the real kidnapper. Oleg receives the call from the hacker whom he commissioned to find out about Francesco's life.
77	14	"Las hijas de Aljarafe"	10 May 2019	1.87
The anguish of Teo's daughters increases. The police go to the hotel to arrest them.
78	15	"El primer beso"	13 May 2019	1.66
A special dinner becomes the perfect occasion for Teresa. She makes Francesco drink alcohol and answer what he knows about Teo and Cayetana Aljarafe. He says he is drunk and opens his heart.
79	16	"Prueba positiva"	14 May 2019	1.87
The Aljarafe sisters don’t know what to do as they deal with the results of Rocio’s medical test. Sofía sets in motion a risky plan that surprises her captors.
80	17	"Corre Sofía, corre"	15 May 2019	1.83
Sofía flees from Lupo and wanders through the streets of Mexico City, lost and scared. He tried to catch her. In Spain, Cayetana hatches a plan to get her third granddaughter away from Teresa.
81	18	"Operación Conejo"	16 May 2019	1.87
Teresa's ex-prison partner is amazed at the message she receives from her. The allies are aware that they can pay with their lives if they join in Teresa’s mission.
82	19	"Teresa al descubierto"	17 May 2019	1.56
Teresa faces a harsh reality. In the midst of her grief, she gives Epifanio and Alejandro two days to find Sofía, otherwise she will collect her debts with interest.
83	20	"Hija de tigra, pintita"	20 May 2019	1.82
At Mercedes' house, Sofía comes out of the bathroom dressed like a princess. She is ready to be delivered and she senses that something is not right. An elegant man knocks at the door.
84	21	"Tan cerca y tan lejos"	21 May 2019	1.82
Teresa and Oleg check the machine room where the children were hidden and discover traces of Sofía. Near the metro, Teresa sees her daughter and runs after her. Francesco waits for his prey.
85	22	"La caceria del lobo"	22 May 2019	1.92
Teresa talks to El Batman without realizing that someone is spying on her. El Italiano takes Sofía to a warehouse and Simón is hidden in the truck.
86	23	"Sexo ancestral"	23 May 2019	1.76
Epifanio forces Teresa to infiltrate the Zurdo Villa cartel, but before she has an appointment without censorship in the pyramids. Batman organizes his trip to Sinaloa.
87	24	"El amor es ciego"	24 May 2019	1.63
Sofía's rescue is at risk. It seems that Teresa has lost her mind and Oleg is enraged with her. For his part, Epifanio suffers the consequences of his wife's behavior.
88	25	"Veinte años no es nada"	27 May 2019	1.77
Teresa gets a big surprise. The house where Güero Dávila lived has not changed and that worries her. In secret, the gardener calls his boss.
89	26	"El encuentro"	28 May 2019	1.85
Teresa and El Zurdo Villa meet each other and go to dinner together. Suddenly, something strange happens in the restaurant and Oleg is forced to activate his command to save Teresa.
90	27	"Operación Caballo de Troya"	29 May 2019	1.92
Teresa goes to the party that Zurdo prepared in her honor. There she receives a very special gift from him. She rejects him and her attitude could cost everyone their lives.
91	28	"Un par de ovarios"	30 May 2019	1.82
El Zurdo detects that there is a signal in his party and that it comes from Teresa. He takes her to his office to clear up doubts and she has it clear, she has been exposed and she has to tell the truth.
92	29	"La declaración"	31 May 2019	1.62
Francesco offers a romantic future to Teresa. He dreams of walking with her through Rome, accompanied by Sofía.
93	30	"Te espero Siso Pernas"	3 June 2019	1.92
The Pernas arrive in Mexico with a thirst for revenge, they can not waste time and immediately look for Teresa. She counterattacks and executes a plan against Zurdo Villa and her Galician enemies.
94	31	"La trampa"	4 June 2019	2.02
El Zurdo has doubts but accepts to face the Pernas. Teresa says that the three Galicians are responsible for the theft of Villa's goods. Siso is amazed to see his partner furious.
95	32	"Hasta nunca"	5 June 2019	1.78
Teresa's plan is perfect, she takes one of her enemies out of the way and receives an attractive proposal. Not everything goes as she wants, one of her loved ones is unconscious on the ground.
96	33	"El principio del fin"	6 June 2019	1.85
Teresa threatens Cayetana that she can have the same ending as the Pernas. She leaves her room and receives an unexpected visit. El Zurdo is hidden and listens to everything.
97	34	"Somos socios"	7 June 2019	1.65
After a long negotiation at El Submarino bar, Teresa closes the deal with Zurdo. Hours later, Willy calls Teresa and asks to be seen urgently. She, distrustful, agrees to see him.
98	35	"La amiga de Sofía"	10 June 2019	1.90
At Villa's ranch, Teresa has an unexpected encounter with a person who knows Sofía and tells her about her kidnapping. The shock is so great that Teresa leaves the place.
99	36	"Contra el suelo"	11 June 2019	1.93
The new partners in drug trafficking undertake their trip to Morocco. On the plane, Villa shows how in love he is with Teresa. She receives a video with a message full of hatred and irony.
100	37	"Como en los viejos tiempos"	12 June 2019	1.80
Teresa, Zurdo and his men are received by Abdelkader in Morocco. He welcomes them with a red carpet and a sumptuous party in his palace. The three close a millionaire business.
101	38	"Los celos"	13 June 2019	1.78
Dinner is served, Teresa attends her date with Lupo and his family. Vita, a prostitute, pretends to be his wife. El Zurdo follows her to the restaurant and interrupts the evening.
102	39	"En la tierra de Corleone"	17 June 2019	1.67
There is a great celebration in the house of the mobster Rosellini. The main capos cheer for the business with Teresa. There is a stranger waiting for Teresa to leave her without a loophole.
103	40	"La voluntad de Dios"	20 June 2019	1.82
A vest with explosives covers Teresa. Umut and Jamal have the detonator and swear revenge. Through a hidden camera, Teresa says goodbye to her team and begs that they do not see her death.
104	41	"La doña en México"	21 June 2019	1.70
El Submarino is the scene of a strong discussion. Broken bottles and screams surprise everyone. Teresa trembles. Even if she saves her daughter, she knows that the girl could end up in other hands.
105	42	"El corazón de la Reina"	24 June 2019	1.81
Teresa meets the candidate Mariano Bravo and also a great secret of Zurdo. She feels affection for her enemy and does not want to cheat. Sofía impacts her mom with a new message.
106	43	"La mano derecha del Zurdo"	25 June 2019	1.77
Teresa and Zurdo see their business grow and of course their profits. The months pass and Teresa is ready to share a romantic evening with her partner. Alejandro attacks his enemies.
107	44	"La propuesta del amor"	28 June 2019	1.48
Teresa informs Epifanio and Alejandro of her plan to put an end to Zurdo. Teresa and Lupo have a date on a beach and the offer of a future together is on the table.
108	45	"La mentira de Teresa"	8 July 2019	1.73
El Zurdo reads in detail the message his daughter found in the bottle. He decides to trace the area of the lake, because he suspects that the kidnapped person is Teresa's daughter.
109	46	"La caída del Zurdo"	9 July 2019	1.88
The romantic date of Zurdo and Teresa becomes a pitched battle. She is exposed and Oleg is seriously injured. El Zurdo puts his life at risk.
110	47	"Todos tras Sofía"	10 July 2019	2.10
Sofía goes aimlessly through the streets of Culiacan. Lupo wants to find her to protect her, like a father to his daughter. But Kira discovers her and shoots her. Teresa and Jonathan do not know where to look.
111	48	"Mamma, soy yo, Sofía"	11 July 2019	2.10
Kira catches Sofía in a police station and pretends to be her mother. While Teresa drives around a factory, she sees a cat that reminds her of her daughter.
112	49	"Amor y odio"	12 July 2019	1.78
After so much time, Teresa and Sofía meet again. The emotion is immense, but the thirst for revenge is much greater. Teresa discovers that her beloved Lupo is the kidnapper of her daughter.
113	50	"Adiós Sofía"	15 July 2019	1.96
Jonathan and Sofía wait for Teresa on the plane. Suddenly, the aircraft explodes with them inside. Teresa is dead in pain, but she must flee from Kira's shots.
114	51	"El dolor de madre"	16 July 2019	2.09
Everyone in Teresa's team is destroyed by Sofía's death. Teresa and Jonathan meet up. Nobody knows how he survived the explosion.
115	52	"Entrégame a Manuela"	17 July 2019	1.98
Teresa asks Lupo to give her Kira if he wants to have her trust again. As part of the plan, Lupo invites the DEA agent out for dinner.
116	53	"A los pies de Abraham Lincoln"	18 July 2019	1.89
Teresa travels to Washington and holds Manuela's nephew hostage to try to obtain information about Lupo's whereabouts. Meanwhile, the DEA decides the fate of Epifanio.
117	54	"Liberen a Lupo"	19 July 2019	1.74
Teresa now knows that Epifanio is going to be replaced by Alejandro in the candidacy for the Mexican presidency. Teresa infiltrates Epifanio's meeting and faces him.
118	55	"El títere de la DEA"	22 July 2019	1.91
Teresa and Lupo tell Epifanio all the truth about his candidacy linked to the aims of the DEA. He goes in search of Alejandro to know his intentions.
119	56	"La ira del Zurdo"	23 July 2019	2.10
Accompanied by Lupo, Teresa arrives at the dry cleaners where Danilo is kidnapped. Villa follows them.
120	57	"El atentado"	24 July 2019	2.00
Alejandro calmly awaits the murder of his brother-in-law. During a political speech, Epifanio is shot and falls to the ground. La Beba cries and desperately asks for help.
121	58	"Tic tac, tic tac"	25 July 2019	1.93
Teresa meets with Alejandro to negotiate her future. He has no other way if he wants to see his boyfriend, Danilo, alive. In Málaga, the tragedy reaches the Aljarafe family.
122	59	"Morder el anzuelo"	26 July 2019	1.87
The DEA operation is underway. Alejandro decides to go to the appointment with Epifanio to kill him. Meanwhile, Cristian and his command are going to capture Teresa and rescue Danilo.
123	60	"Hasta el fin del mundo"	29 July 2019	2.23
Teresa's enemies play their last card. Teresa flees to an obscure place without knowing that someone knows her location and stalks her.

=== Special ===
Title	Original release date	Viewers (millions)
"La Gran Noche"	30 July 2019	1.03
Special where Kate del Castillo and the rest of the cast of La Reina del Sur, second season tell anecdotes of behind-the-scenes situations and how they became a family.
