= La Reina del Sur season 3 =

La Reina del Sur
- Season 3
- Starring: Kate del Castillo; Pêpê Rapazote
- No. of episodes: 60

Release
- Original network: Telemundo
- Original release: 18 October 2022 – 16 January 2023

Season chronology
- ← Previous; Season 2

The third season of the American drama television series La Reina del Sur takes place four years after the events of the second season. The season is written by Lina Uribe and Darío Vanegas and directed by Carlos Bolado, Carlos Villegas and Claudia Pedraza, with Marcos Santana serving as executive producer and showrunner.

The season was announced on 16 July 2020.

The season premiered on Telemundo on 18 October 2022.

== Plot ==
After four years in prison in the United States for the deaths of three DEA agents, Teresa Mendoza escapes but will have to face a world full of conspiracy, risking her life in order to clear her name and reunite with her daughter Sofía.

== Cast ==
=== Main ===
- Kate del Castillo as Teresa Mendoza
- Pêpê Rapazote as Pablo Landero
- Antonio Gil as Oleg Yosikov
- Isabella Sierra as Sofía Dantes
- Alejandro Calva as César Güemes "Batman"
- Cuca Escribano as Sheila
- Kika Edgar as Genoveva Alcalá
- Lincoln Palomeque as Faustino Sánchez Godoy
- Ed Trucco as Ernie Palermo
- Horacio García Rojas as Charlie Velázquez
- Ágata Clares as Paloma Aljarafe
- Emmanuel Orenday as Danilo Márquez
- Beth Chamberlin as Jane Kosar
- Sofia Lama as Susana Guzmán
- Humberto Zurita as Epifanio Vargas

=== Recurring and guest stars ===
- Tiago Correa as Jonathan Peres
- Daniel Martínez as Senator
- Carlos Valencia as Montaño
- Arturo Ríos as Delio Jurado
- Dmitry Anisimov as Anton Potapushin
- Sara Vidorreta as Rocío Aljarafe
- Denia Agalianou as Vanessa
- Anderley Palomino as Mateo Mena
- Eduardo Yáñez as Antonio Alcalá
- Noé Hernández as General Carlos Garrido
- Pedro Grossman as Rogelio Tejada
- Matias Novoa as Nacho Duarte
- Jorge Ortiz as Don Satur
- Cristian Mercado as Captain Fredy Rojas
- Ariel Vargas as Sierra
- Fernando Solórzano as Father Gonzalo Perea
- Jarlin Martínez as Officer Ruiz
- Carla Ortiz as Karen Chacón
- Jorge Hidalgo as Abel
- Victor Rebull as Fedor Yasikov
- Alejandra Lazcano as Lina
- Alina Lozano
- Susana Condori
- Alejandro Marañón as El Perro
- Marcelo Dos Santos as Lorenzo Mortati
- María Abadi as Julieta Brito
- Alejo Fernández as Lucho
- Fabio Di Tomaso as Samuel Graiver
- Guillermo Pfening as Gregorio
- José María Negri
- Rodrigo Palacios as Bernardo
- Mayella Lloclla as Ana del Castillo
- Mariano Bertolini as Hugo
- Beto Benites as Rubén
- Gerardo Zamora as Eloy
- Emanuel Soriano as Armando
- Favio Posca as Salvatorre
- Gon Spina as Luis Gallardo

== Production ==
=== Development ===
On 16 July 2020, Telemundo announced that it had renewed La Reina del Sur for a third season. Filming of the season began on 31 May 2021. The season was filmed for seven months in countries like Bolivia, Peru, Argentina and Colombia. Filming concluded on 20 December 2021.

=== Marketing ===
To promote the new season, Telemundo began to show re-runs of the second season weekday afternoons beginning on 18 July 2022. On 21 April 2022, Telemundo released the first teaser for the season.

== Episodes ==
No. overall	No. in season	Title	Original release date	Viewers (millions)
124	1	"Morir para vivir"	18 October 2022	1.21
125	2	"Bye, Bye gringos"	19 October 2022	1.45
126	3	"El trato"	20 October 2022	1.29
127	4	"Volverte a ver"	21 October 2022	1.01
128	5	"La bienvenida"	24 October 2022	1.18
129	6	"Dime quién eres"	25 October 2022	1.06
130	7	"Desaparecida"	26 October 2022	1.09
131	8	"Cholitas en acción"	27 October 2022	1.28
132	9	"Error de principiante"	28 October 2022	0.99
133	10	"Rumbo a Potosí"	31 October 2022	0.85
134	11	"El Tio"	1 November 2022	0.97
135	12	"El negocio"	2 November 2022	0.93
136	13	"Going to London"	3 November 2022	0.91
137	14	"La traición"	4 November 2022	0.76
138	15	"Bad Luck"	7 November 2022	0.79
139	16	"Un viejo conocido"	9 November 2022	0.88
140	17	"A salvo"	10 November 2022	0.82
141	18	"El hombre del que me enamoré"	11 November 2022	0.88
142	19	"Adiós, Baronesa"	14 November 2022	0.78
143	20	"La caleta"	15 November 2022	0.93
144	21	"Que esperen los demás"	16 November 2022	0.86
145	22	"El jinete negro"	17 November 2022	0.78
146	23	"Para quién trabajas"	18 November 2022	0.88
147	24	"Asunto de vida o muerte"	21 November 2022	0.82
148	25	"Que en paz descanse"	22 November 2022	0.91
149	26	"Venimos por ustedes"	23 November 2022	1.06
150	27	"De mujer a mujer"	28 November 2022	0.93
151	28	"Peor que antes"	29 November 2022	0.93
152	29	"Esconderse no es una opción"	30 November 2022	1.00
153	30	"Dos equipos"	1 December 2022	0.93
154	31	"Un negocio como cualquier otro"	2 December 2022	0.88
155	32	"La mejor defensa es el ataque"	5 December 2022	0.90
156	33	"Favor con favor se paga"	6 December 2022	0.96
157	34	"Un juego de probabilidades"	7 December 2022	0.83
158	35	"Que gane el mejor"	8 December 2022	0.81
159	36	"Hombre es hombre"	9 December 2022	0.84
160	37	"Zombi"	12 December 2022	0.89
161	38	"La cita"	13 December 2022	0.95
162	39	"Que pidan lo que quieran"	14 December 2022	0.81
163	40	"La regresión"	15 December 2022	0.83
164	41	"Tú no eres capaz"	16 December 2022	0.78
165	42	"La hora gris"	19 December 2022	1.00
166	43	"Me la vas a pagar"	20 December 2022	0.80
167	44	"El intercambio"	21 December 2022	0.85
168	45	"Función a las siete"	22 December 2022	0.92
169	46	"Un poco de cultura"	26 December 2022	0.79
170	47	"Apocalipsis"	27 December 2022	0.80
171	48	"Pisándole los talones"	28 December 2022	0.85
172	49	"Hola Higgins"	29 December 2022	0.88
173	50	"La voy a extrañar"	2 January 2023	0.86
174	51	"Invencible"	3 January 2023	0.89
175	52	"Hermanos del alma"	4 January 2023	0.87
176	53	"Un rayo de luz"	5 January 2023	0.92
177	54	"Senador García"	6 January 2023	0.83
178	55	"Una celebridad"	9 January 2023	0.96
179	56	"Sálvenlo"	10 January 2023	0.87
180	57	"El peor error"	11 January 2023	0.92
181	58	"Él es Uriel"	12 January 2023	0.92
182	59	"El informante"	13 January 2023	0.96
183	60	"A hierro matas, a hierro mueres"	16 January 2023	1.10

== Music ==
La Reina del Sur: 3ra Temporada (Banda Sonora Original)

Soundtrack album by Carlos Rafael Rivera
- Released: 21 October 2022
- Length: 1:30:00
- Label: Discos Telemundo
- Producer: Carlos Rafael Rivera

La Reina del Sur: 3ra Temporada (Banda Sonora Original) is the soundtrack to the third season of the series. It was released by Discos Telemundo on 21 October 2022. It features 45 score cues composed by Carlos Rafael Rivera, and the theme song of the third season performed by The Miami Symphony Orchestra and Sofi Saar.

No.	Title	Artist	Length
1.	"Título Principal - La Reina del Sur 3"	Carlos Rafael Rivera, The Miami Symphony Orchestra	1:07
2.	"Todo Por Su Libertad"	Carlos Rafael Rivera, Sofi Saar	2:26
3.	"Wangetti"	Carlos Rafael Rivera, The Miami Symphony Orchestra	4:29
4.	"Teresa y Sofia"	Carlos Rafael Rivera, The Miami Symphony Orchestra	2:24
5.	"Aterrizando en La Guajira"	Carlos Rafael Rivera, The Miami Symphony Orchestra	1:29
6.	"Cementerio de Trenes"	Carlos Rafael Rivera, The Miami Symphony Orchestra	3:03
7.	"El Salar de Uyuni"	Carlos Rafael Rivera, The Miami Symphony Orchestra	2:34
8.	"Machu Picchu"	Carlos Rafael Rivera, The Miami Symphony Orchestra	2:27
9.	"La Fuga en Buenos Aires"	Carlos Rafael Rivera, The Miami Symphony Orchestra	1:26
10.	"1493 Días"	Carlos Rafael Rivera, Asuka Ito	0:43
11.	"La Hora Gris"	Carlos Rafael Rivera, Asuka Ito	1:37
12.	"Duelo en Málaga"	Carlos Rafael Rivera, Asuka Ito	1:02
13.	"Maldito Presidente"	Carlos Rafael Rivera	1:32
14.	"Prisionera Presidencial"	Carlos Rafael Rivera, Ray D Kim	1:44
15.	"Landero"	Carlos Rafael Rivera, David Stal	1:22
16.	"Aliados en Colorado Parte 1"	Carlos Rafael Rivera, Asuka Ito	1:18
17.	"Aliados en Colorado Parte 2"	Carlos Rafael Rivera, Asuka Ito	2:06
18.	"Las Pistas de Monte Cristo"	Carlos Rafael Rivera, David Stal	2:54
19.	"Sofia Se Va"	Carlos Rafael Rivera, David Stal	1:47
20.	"Morir Para Vivir"	Carlos Rafael Rivera, David Stal, Asuka Ito	2:18
21.	"Escape del Bote Gringo"	Carlos Rafael Rivera, Asuka Ito	1:45
22.	"Lanzacohetes"	Carlos Rafael Rivera, Asuka lto, Ray D Kim	1:46
23.	"Goddamn"	Carlos Rafael Rivera, Asuka Ito	1:00
24.	"La Reina Regresa"	Carlos Rafael Rivera, Asuka Ito	1:45
25.	"Secretos de la DEA"	Carlos Rafael Rivera, Asuka Ito	1:31
26.	"En Rumbo a México"	Carlos Rafael Rivera, David Stal	1:30
27.	"En el Río Bravo"	Carlos Rafael Rivera, David Stal	1:49
28.	"Viva la Reina"	Carlos Rafael Rivera, The Miami Symphony Orchestra	3:03
29.	"Acecho en Santa Marta"	David Stal, Carlos Rafael Rivera	1:48
30.	"El Paseo Millonario"	Carlos Rafael Rivera, David Stal	2:04
31.	"Huyendo en El Rodadero"	David Stal, Carlos Rafael Rivera	1:49
32.	"Mateo"	Carlos Rafael Rivera, David Stal	1:32
33.	"Dron en el Bosque"	Carlos Rafael Rivera, Ray Kim	1:33
34.	"La Gruta Americana Parte 1"	Carlos Rafael Rivera, Asuka Ito	1:56
35.	"La Gruta Americana Parte 2"	Asuka Ito, David Stal, Carlos Rafael Rivera	2:26
36.	"Oleg"	Carlos Rafael Rivera, Asuka Ito	3:26
37.	"México Lindo y Querido, Mijita"	Carlos Rafael Rivera	1:12
38.	"Un Plan Que No Tiene Igual"	Carlos Rafael Rivera	2:02
39.	"La DEA"	Carlos Rafael Rivera, David Stal	2:14
40.	"Un Cuatro Bien Puesto"	Carlos Rafael Rivera, David Stal	2:40
41.	"El Mercado de las Brujas"	Carlos Rafael Rivera, David Stal	1:23
42.	"Genoveva Sin Sentido"	Carlos Rafael Rivera, Asuka Ito	2:17
43.	"Batman y El Señor Presidente"	Ray D Kim, Carlos Rafael Rivera	1:49
44.	"Camino de la Muerte"	Carlos Rafael Rivera, Asuka Ito	2:47
45.	"Buscando al Jinete en Bolivia"	Carlos Rafael Rivera, David Stal	1:34
46.	"Reina Reprise"	Carlos Rafael Rivera, Asuka Ito	2:01
Total length:			1:30:00
