= Pol Monen =

Spanish actor (born 1994)

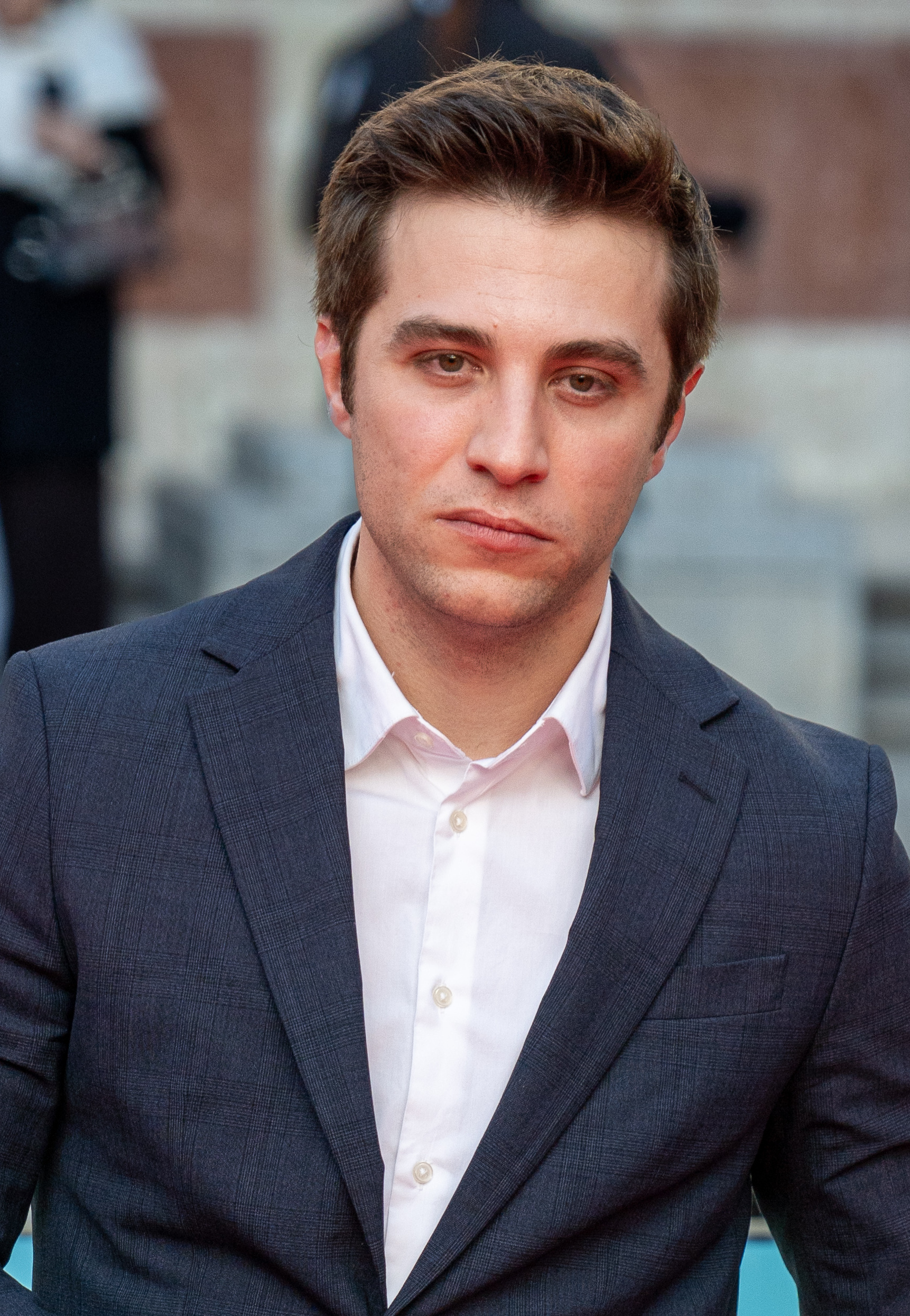
- Monen in 2026
- Born: Pol Montañés Enrich; 22 July 1994 (age 32); Barcelona, Catalonia, Spain
- Occupation: Actor

Pol Montañés Enrich (born 22 July 1994), better known as Pol Monen, is a Spanish actor who rose to fame for his role as Carlos in Amar, a film for which he was nominated for Best New Actor at the Goya Awards, as well as the film Who Would You Take to a Deserted Island?. In 2022 he stars in the Netflix Original series The Girl in the Mirror, as Bruno.

== Biography ==
Pol Montañés Enrich was born in Barcelona on 22 July 1994.

He is known by the stage name of Pol Monen (Monen is the fusion of his two family names, 'Montañés' and 'Enrich'). He made a minor appearance in the 2004 film La Mala Educación, when he was barely 10 years old, whereas he had his television debut in 2005 with a guest role in TV3's El cor de la ciutat. He moved to Madrid at age 18, where he studied journalism. He trained as an actor under Juan Carlos Corazza.

His leading performance as Carlos in the 2017 romantic drama film Amar: With You Until the End of the World earned him a nomination to the Goya Award for Best New Actor at the 32nd Goya Awards. In 2018, he joined the cast of the Telemundo and Netflix series La Reina del Sur (season 2).

He starred as Eze in Who Would You Take to a Deserted Island? and performed the role of Said in So My Grandma's a Lesbian! , both films released in 2019.

He performed a main cast role in the TV series Campamento Albanta, released in 2020 on Atresplayer Premium.

== Filmography ==
Film

| Year | Title | Role | Notes | Ref. |
|---|---|---|---|---|
| 2017 | Amar (Amar: With You Until the End of the World) | Carlos | Starring role | |
| 2018 | Tu hijo (Your Son) | Marcos | | |
| 2019 | ¿A quién te llevarías a una isla desierta? (Who Would You Take to a Deserted Island?) | Eze | Starring role | |
| 2019 | Salir del ropero (So My Grandma's A Lesbian!) | Said | | |
| 2021 | Con quién viajas (Carpoolers) | Miguel | | |
| 2021 | Ego | Jorge | | |
| 2022 | La novia de América | Tono | Starring role | |

Television

| Year | Title | Role | Notes | Ref. |
|---|---|---|---|---|
| 2018 | Vivir sin permiso (Unauthorized Living) | Lara's boyfriend | | |
| 2019 | La Reina del Sur | Juan | Season 2 | |
| 2020 | Campamento Albanta | Abel | | |
| 2022 | Alma (The Girl In The Mirror) | Bruno | Starring Role | |

== Awards and nominations ==
| Year | Award | Category | Work | Result | Ref. |
|---|---|---|---|---|---|
| 2018 | 32nd Goya Awards | Best New Actor | Amar | Nominated | |
| 2018 | 73rd CEC Medals | Best New Actor | Amar | Nominated | |
| 2019 | 34th Festival Cinema Jove | "Un futuro de Cine" Award | - | Won | |
