= Paul Pen =

Spanish author

Paul Pen is a Spanish author of literary fiction, thriller and suspense. His first novel, El aviso, earned him the title of Fnac New Talent in 2011 and has been translated into German, Italian and English. This debut was described as "outstanding" by Babelia, the cultural section of Spanish newspaper El País. In 2013, he released his second novel, El brillo de las luciérnagas (Plaza y Janés), published in English by AmazonCrossing in April 2016, translated by Simon Bruni. He has also published some fifteen short stories, some of them appearing in men's magazines such as NOX and Don. In 2017, his third novel La casa entre los cactus (Desert Flowers) was published internationally in many languages, as it happened in 2019 with his subsequent novel Un matrimonio perfecto (Under the Water).

== Film and TV ==
Most of Pen's novels are being or have been adapted for the big screen. The film adaptation of his first novel El aviso was released on Netflix in July 2018 as The Warning. Jorge Guerricaechevarría penned the Spanish script with revisions by Chris Sparling and Chris Rossi.

The House Among the Cactuses, with the screenplay written by Paul Pen himself, will premiere in September 2022.

In his capacity as scriptwriter, Paul Pen also collaborated in the supernatural thriller The Girl in the Mirror.

== Bibliography ==
=== Novels ===
| Title | Publication date | Publisher |
|---|---|---|
| El aviso | June 2011 | RBA Libros |
| Il presagio | October 2011 | Newton Compton Editori |
| 9 - Die Wiederkehr | February 2013 | Heyne Verlag (Penguin Random House Germany) |
| El brillo de las luciérnagas | May 2013 | Plaza y Janés (Penguin Random House Spain) |
| The Light of the Fireflies | April 2016 | AmazonCrossing |
| La casa entre los cactus | June 2017 | Plaza y Janés (Penguin Random House Spain) |
| Desert Flowers | August 2017 | AmazonCrossing |
| Un matrimonio perfecto | May 2019 | Plaza y Janés (Penguin Random House Spain) |
| Under the Water | October 2019 | AmazonCrossing |

=== Short stories ===
| Title | Published | Notes |
|---|---|---|
| Una escena matrimonial del todo insólita | "Visiones 2007" (AECFT) | Winner of III Certamen Internacional La cerilla mágica. |
| OTEL | RHM FLASH (Penguin Random House Spain) | Also published in men's magazine Revista Don. |
| La sangre del muerto | RHM FLASH (Penguin Random House Spain) | |

=== Collections ===
- Trece historias (2015)
