= Juanjo Giménez =

Spanish director and filmmaker (born 1963)

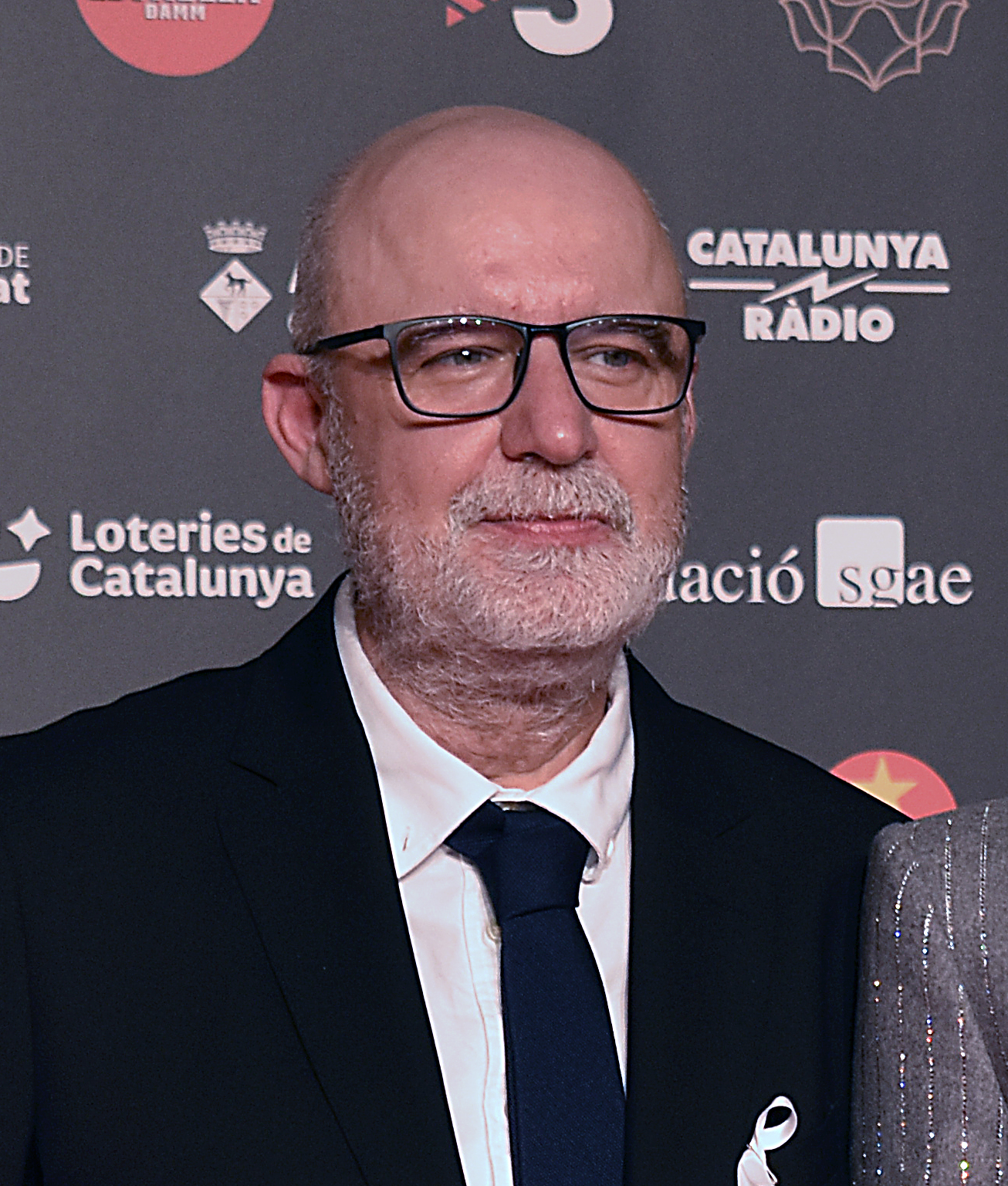
Giménez at the 14th Gaudí Awards in 2022

Juanjo Giménez Peña (born 18 April 1963) is a Spanish director and filmmaker. He is best known for his films Indirect Free Kick (1997), Rodilla (2009), "Nitbus" (2007), Maximum Penalty (2005) and Timecode that earned him Short Film Palme d'Or at 69th annual Cannes Film Festival and received Academy Award for Best Live Action Short Film nomination at the 89th Academy Awards. He is also the founder of the production companies Nadir Films and Salto de Eje.

== Filmography ==
- 2021 - Out of Sync
- 2016 - Timecode (Short)
- 2014 - El Arca de Noé (producer)
- 2012 - Los increíbles (producer)
- 2012 - Enxaneta (producer)
- 2012 - Alfred(producer)
- 2010 - Esquivar y pegar (Documentary)
- 2009 - Rodilla: Cromos para ajustar cuentas con la infancia (Short)
- 2007 - Nitbus (Short) (as Juan José Giménez i Peña)
- 2005 - Máxima pena (Short)
- 2001 - Tilt (as Juanjo Giménez)
- 1997 - Indirect Free-Kick (Short)
- 1995 - Ella está enfadada (Short) (as Juanjo Giménez)
- 1995 - Especial (con luz)

== Awards and nominations ==
- Nominated: Academy Award for Best Live Action Short Film
- Won: Goya Award for Best Fictional Short Film
- Won: Short Film Palme d'Or
