= Fundación El Compromiso =

Fundación El Compromiso is a spanish foundation for international development cooperation. It won the 2006 Jaime Brunet International Human Rights Award for its work in Sierra Leone.

== History ==
Founded in 1994 in Spain, El Compromiso (Registro Ministerio del Interior nº.141.254) formally became a foundation in April 2000 (Registro de Fundaciones Asistenciales, nº. 28/1.154). The foundation is dedicated to international education, training, and exchange. El Compromiso partners with foundations, governments, corporations, NGOs, and other institutions to develop and implement programs that impact the local and international community. El Compromiso provides global services that benefit children, men, and women in 22 countries. The foundation's primary objective is to help find solutions to some of the greatest challenges faced by the most marginalized and unprotected members of society, especially those in developing countries.

They strive to achieve these goals through:

- Support of public opinion campaigns that raise and promote awareness about the issues that the address and directly impact the groups mentioned in the above.
- Finding and developing funding for the design and execution of development projects that can be used to solve the challenges by these groups.

The Foundation encourages the development of cooperation efforts. While at the same time assisting and carrying out philanthropic and formative acts directed at toward serving those who are in greatest need of assistance. El Compromiso strives for the creation of a better world, one in which every person has free access to regular and sufficient alimentation, education, health, and housing, in an atmosphere of respect for Human Rights and the environment. Supporting programs for operations and missions in diverse geographic areas and sectors. Since its creation, El Compromiso has collaborated with more than 30 development projects in many countries. The foundation has developed two lines of action in order to achieve its aims, these consist of: the management and support of development projects, and raising public awareness in the developed countries.

== Program Areas ==
- Education and Professional Development
- Health and Hygiene
- Agriculture and Rural Development
- Construction and Infrastructure Development
- Gender Issues
- Human Rights

== Educational and Public Outreach Programs ==
El Compromiso also dedicates a substantial amount of its efforts to public awareness campaigns. These campaigns explore the issues like that of income and gender inequality in developing countries, and help to increase exposure of them to the general public of socially and economically developed countries. The foundation believes that education and public awareness campaigns that address respect for Human Rights is key to building a foundation for sustainable development, fighting inequality, and essential to nurture a democratic system. With the successful completion of these programs which aim to promote and defend Human Rights, the foundation hopes that by providing training and conducting public opinion campaigns will contribute direct or indirectly to prevent and eradicate some of the injustices which are widespread in the world today.

== Projects ==
2012

2011

2010

2009

2008

- Sierra Leone

Construction of dying floors for Magbonkonie, Mamankoh, Bubuya y Yebaya communities in Tonko Limba's Chiefdom.

- Congo

Construction of a Primary School in the North of Sierra Leone.

2007

- Benin

Sustain and monitor the people affected from HIV/AIDS in N'Dali.

- Congo

Access to medicines and to the Health Center “La Trinité” for 80.000 people of the Mikono neighbourhood, in Kinshasa, DRC.

- Sierra Leone

Building of a Secondary School in Kukuna. (2nd part) Construction of a water-well.

2006

- Benin

Sustain and monitor the people affected from HIV/AIDS in N'Dali.

- Sierra Leone

Building of a Secondary School in Kukuna. Construction of a water-well. Women and young peoples’ training and education.

- Peru

Providing drinking water in San Fabian, Huancavelica.

2005

- Guinea Bissau

HIV/AIDS prevention in educational areas of Bissau, Bafatá and Gabú.

- Togo

Installation of a mill to transform cassava into flour, in Zooti-Kpota.

- Sierra Leone

Building of a school in North Sierra Leone. Building of a school in Forecariah, North of Sierra Leone. Building of a school in Malikia, North of Sierra Leone. Building of a Primary school in Milikie, North of Sierra Leone. Building of a school in Kafotori, North of Sierra Leone. Building of 50 latrines in Tonko Limba and Bramahia chiefdoms, North of Sierra Leone. Building of 50 latrines in the North of Sierra Leone. Building of 50 latrines in the North of Sierra Leone. Building of a school in Tamango, North of Sierra Leone. Building of a school in Kakola, North of Sierra Leone. Building of a school in Kabassa, North of Sierra Leone.

2004

- Sierra Leone

Construction of tutelary apartments in Sierra Leone. Construction of tutelary apartments for ex-soldier boys and girls in Sierra Leone. Construction of tutelary apartments for ex-soldier boys and girls in Sierra Leone. Building of a school and nursery in Timbo, North Sierra Leone. Construction of 2 tutelary apartments. Shipping of a 4-wheel drive car for the use of the Javarianos Missionaries.

2003

- Sierra Leone

Support of the Rehabilitation project for children soldiers developed by the Javarianos Missionaries in Freetown (1999–2003) Madagascar Shipping books to the library of Hispanic studies in Antananarivo University.

- Perú

Shipment of books and other didactic material to different NGOs in Lima.

- Spain

Shipment of 1.500 books to Aljaraque's council (Huelva).

2002

- Sierra Leone

Construction and equipment provisions for 2 schools in Ogoo Farm and Construction of two houses for tutelary apartments for ex soldier girls and boys in Sierra Leone. Construction of 2 tutelary apartments for ex soldier girls and boys in Sierra Leone.

2001

- Nicaragua

Technical grants for at risk youth in Managua. Financed by Alcalá de Henares Council. Grant and support Project for children and youth for their studies in Primary Schools. Psychological support for their families. Financed by Alcalá de Henares Council.

- Sierra Leone

Financing of professional training for 45 soldier girls and boys.

2000

- Sierra Leone

Maintenance of 5 tutelary apartments for soldier girls and boys.

- Nicaragua

Support Children and Youth with low-income levels to study in their Primary School in Managua. Food production Project for poor rural peasant communities.

- El Salvador

Training Project for groups of craftsmen and women Strengthening the Nahua school project.

- Bolivia

Non-traditional agriculture and livestock development projects. Training projects to better the quality of small producers. Educational projects.

- Spain

IT lectures hall development in San José de Hellín School, Albacete.

1999

- India

Co financing of a House in Calcutta for street children. Development by Manos Unidas and la Fundación El Compromiso.

- Guinea Equatorial

Medicine Shipment project. Developed in collaboration with the Socio-sanitary Religious Association.

1998

- India

Economical support for the education and support of 12 street children in Calcutta.

1997

- India

Financial support for the educational, alimentary and housing needs of 12 street children in Calcutta.

- Ethiopia

Hospital equipment shipment (disposables, surgical and orthopedic equipment) to the Communal Health Project in Angare, that provides medical assistance and health education to more than 8000 people. In collaboration with the organization Nous Camins.

- Niger

Medicine Shipment to Niger. In collaboration with Farmacéuticos Mundi.

1996

- Nicaragua

Support of education centers in Nicaragua through the donation of vehicles for school transportation (buses) Shipment of pedagogical equipment to two organization centers in Nicaragua.

1995

- Nicaragua

Health, housing program implementation Project in the 25 de Abril district in the City of Matagalpa, with more than 3000 beneficiaries

- Bosnia

Emergency Project in conflict areas: medicine shipment to areas affected by the war.
