= Timecode (2016 film) =

- Film poster
- Directed by: Juanjo Giménez
- Written by: Pere Altimira; Juanjo Giménez Peña
- Produced by: Juanjo Giménez; Daniel Villanueva; Arturo Méndiz
- Cinematography: Pere Pueyo
- Edited by: Silvia Cervantes
- Music by: Iván Cester; Javier Bayon
- Distributed by: Nadir Films; ECIR
- Release date: 21 May 2016 (France)
- Running time: 15 minutes
- Country: Spain
- Language: Spanish

Timecode is a Spanish live-action short film directed by Juanjo Giménez. It won the Short Film Palme d'Or award at 69th annual Cannes Film Festival in 2016. It is also nominated for an Academy Award for Best Live Action Short Film at the 89th Academy Awards in 2017.

== Plot ==
Luna and Diego are car park security guards. Diego does the night shift, and Luna works by day. One day, Luna's boss asks her to investigate a broken tail light.

== Cast ==
- Lali Ayguadé as Luna
- Nicolas Ricchini as Diego
- Pep Domenech
- Vicente Gil

== Awards and nominations ==
- Nominated: Academy Award for Best Live Action Short Film
- Won: Goya Award for Best Fictional Short Film
- Won: Short Film Palme d'Or
- Won: Bunter Hund – Internationales Kurzfilmfest München
