= Kika Edgar =

Mexican actress and singer

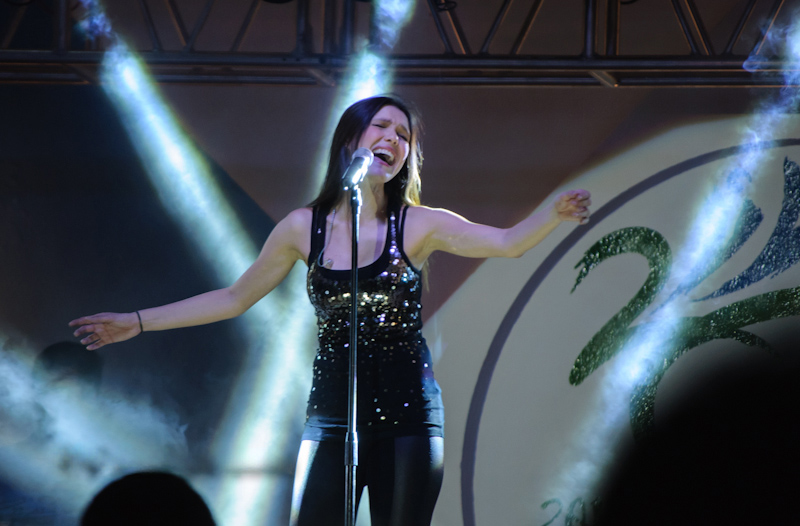
- Born: Sandra Erika Edgar Garza; 9 January 1977 (age 49); Ciudad Madero, Tamaulipas, Mexico
- Occupations: Actress and Singer

Kika Edgar (born January 9, 1985) is a Mexican actress and singer.

== Biography ==
Sandra Erika Edgar Garza was born in Ciudad Madero, Tamaulipas, Mexico. Beginning her career primarily in theater and musicals, she has become well known in Mexico, starring in telenovelas such as Amor Real and Contra Viento y Marea. She began her singing career in 2006 after her appearance in the Mexican reality show Cantando por un Sueño. Since then, Kika has released eight solo albums, and has been called La Nueva Gran Intérprete de México ("The New Great Performer of Mexico").

== Early career ==
Edgar began her career by studying acting and singing at the Centro de Educación Artística de Televisa (CEA). She specialized in ballet dancing, as she aspired to become a professional artist. She gave birth to a child in May 2009; she did not indicate the identity of the father.

=== Television career ===
2023	Pacto de Silencio	Irene Bustamante	Main
2022	La Reina del Sur 3	Genoveva Alcalá	Supporting Role
2020	La Doña 2	Romelia Vega	Main Antagonist
2019	La Reina del Sur 2	Genoveva Alcalá	Supporting Role
2017	Nada personal	Claudia Campos	Co-Protagonist
2012-13	Porque el amor manda	Xochitl Martínez	Co-protagonist
2011	La fuerza del destino	Carolina Muñoz	Supporting Role
2010	Mujeres Asesinas 3	Paula, bailarina - Paula Treviño	TV Series
2009	Atrévete a soñar	Ingrid	Supporting Role
2007-08	Pasión	Inés Márquez de Darién	Supporting Role
2005-06	Contra viento y marea	Regina Campos	Co-protagonist
2004	Mujer, casos de la vida real		TV Series
2003-04	Clap, el lugar de tus sueños	Helena Millán	Protagonist
2003	Amor real	Catalina Heredia	Supporting Role
2000	Primer amor... a mil por hora	Olivia	Supporting Role

== Albums ==
- Cantando Por Un Sueño (2006) (Duets with her Cantando por un Sueño partner Raul Juárez)
- Kika (2007)
- Lo Siento mi Amor (2008) (Tribute album to legendary Mexican singer Lupita D'Alessio)
- Señor Amante (2009)
- Broadway (2011)
- Nuevas Canciones (2016)
- Solo Boleros Vol. 1 (2022)
- Solo Boleros Vol 2 (2023)
- Colección de Antaño (2024)
