= Esteban Crespo =

Spanish film maker

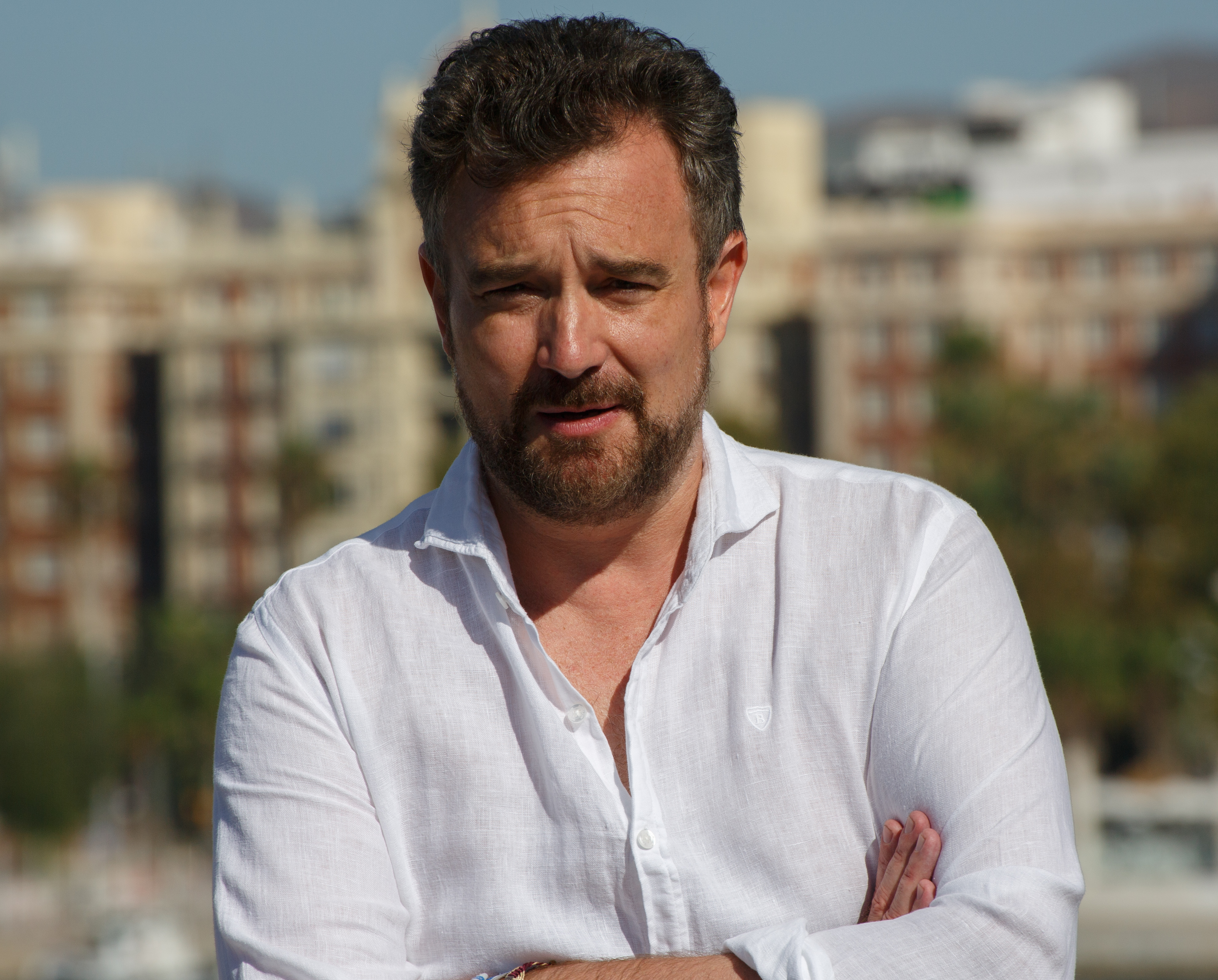
- Born: Esteban Crespo García; July 10, 1971 (age 54); Madrid, Spain
- Occupations: Producer, director and writer
- Years active: 1991–present

Esteban Crespo (born June 10, 1971) is a Spanish film maker. Crespo was nominated for an Academy Award for Best Live Action Short Film for the 2013 film Aquel no era yo (That Wasn't Me).
