= 70th CEC Awards =

Spanish film awards

- Date: 2 February 2015
- Site: Cine Palafox, Madrid, Spain
- Hosted by: Víctor Clavijo; Nur Levi
- Organized by: Círculo de Escritores Cinematográficos

Highlights
- Most awards: Marshland (8)
- Most nominations: Marshland (10)

The 70th CEC Medals ceremony, presented by the Círculo de Escritores Cinematográficos, took place on 2 February 2015 at the Cine Palafox in Madrid. The gala was hosted by Víctor Clavijo and Nur Levi.

== Winners and nominees ==
The winners and nominees are listed as follows:

Best Film: Marshland; El Niño; Wild Tales; Loreak	Best Animation Film: Mortadelo and Filemon: Mission Implausible; Mummy, I'm a Zombie; La tropa de trapo en la selva del arcoiris; Holy Night! Noche de ¿paz?
Best Director: Alberto Rodríguez – Marshland; Daniel Monzón – El Niño; Carlos Vermut – Magical Girl; Damián Szifrón – Wild Tales	Best New Director: Juanfer Andrés, Esteban Roel – Shrew's Nest; Carlos Marques-Marcet – 10,000 km; Beatriz Sanchís – They Are All Dead; Francisco Sánchez Varela – Paco de Lucía: La búsqueda
Best Original Screenplay: Rafael Cobos, Alberto Rodríguez – Marshland; Carlos Vermut – Magical Girl; Borja Cobeaga, Diego San José – Spanish Affair; Daniel Monzón, Jorge Guerricaechevarría – El Niño; Damián Szifrón – Wild Tales	Best Adapted Screenplay: Anna Soler-Pont – Traces of Sandalwood; Javier Fesser, Cristóbal Ruiz, Claro García – Mortadelo and Filemon: Mission Implausible; Chema Rodríguez, David Planell, Pablo Burgués – Nightfall in India; Isabel Sánchez, Enrique García – 321 Days in Michigan
Best Actor: Javier Gutiérrez – Marshland; Raúl Arévalo – Marshland; Javier Cámara – The Unexpected Life; Luis Bermejo – Magical Girl	Best Actress: Bárbara Lennie – Magical Girl; María León – Marseille; Macarena Gómez – Shrew's Nest; Elena Anaya – They Are All Dead
Best Supporting Actor: Karra Elejalde – Spanish Affair; José Sacristán – Magical Girl; Jesús Carroza – El Niño; Antonio de la Torre – Marshland	Best Supporting Actress: Itziar Aizpuru – Loreak; Carmen Machi – Spanish Affair; Bárbara Lennie – El Niño; María León – Carmina and Amen
Best New Actor: Dani Rovira – Spanish Affair; Jesús Castro – El Niño; David Verdaguer – 10,000 km; Carlos Rodríguez – Beautiful Youth	Best New Actress: Nerea Barros – Marshland; Ingrid García-Jonsson – Beautiful Youth; Natalia Tena – 10,000 km; Yolanda Ramos – Carmina and Amen; Nagore Aranburu – Loreak
Best Cinematography: Álex Catalán – Marshland; Carles Gusi – El Niño; Kalo Berridi – Spanish Affair; Javier Agirre – Loreak	Best Editing: José M. G. Moyano – Marshland; Cristina Pastor – El Niño; Bernat Vilaplana – Open Windows; Damián Szifrón, Pablo Barbieri – Wild Tales
Best Music: Julio de la Rosa – Marshland; Roque Baños – El Niño; Pascal Gaigne – Loreak; Gustavo Santaolalla – Wild Tales	Best Documentary Film: Paco de Lucía: La búsqueda; Antonio Vega. Tu voz entre otras mil; ¡Zarpazos! Un viaje por el Spanish Horror; Nacido en Gaza
Best Foreign Film: Nebraska; Ida; Interstellar; Boyhood

== Special awards ==
- Honorary Medal: Arturo Fernández
- Medal for the Literary Merit and Journalistic Merit: Francisco Blanco, "Boquerini"
- Medal for the Promotion of Cinema: Juan Zavala
