= List of Spanish films of 2014 =

A list of Spanish-produced and co-produced feature films released in 2014 in Spain. When applicable, the domestic theatrical release date is favoured.

== Major releases ==
Release		Title (Domestic title)	Cast & Crew	Distribution label	Ref.
J A N U A R Y	1	Turning Tide (En solitario)	Director: Christophe Offenstein Cast: François Cluzet, Samy Seghir, Virginie Efira, Guillaume Canet, José Coronado, Arly Jover	A Contracorriente Films	
J A N U A R Y	10	Pensé que iba a haber fiesta	Director: Victoria Galardi Cast: Elena Anaya, Valeria Bertuccelli, Fernán Mirás	Caramel Films	
J A N U A R Y	17	Memoria de mis putas tristes	Director: Henning Carlsen Cast: Emilio Echevarría, Geraldine Chaplin, Paola Medina, Ángela Molina, Olivia Molina	Kiss Comunicació	
J A N U A R Y	24	Inside Love (Presentimientos)	Director: Santiago Tabernero Cast: Marta Etura, Eduardo Noriega, Alfonso Bassave, Irene Escolar	Syldavia Cinema	
J A N U A R Y	24	Mindscape	Director: Jorge Dorado Cast: Mark Strong, Taissa Farmiga, Brian Cox, Alberto Ammann, Saskia Reeves, Indira Varma, Noah Taylor, Richard Dillane	Warner Bros. Pictures	
F E B R U A R Y	14	Solo para dos	Director: Roberto Santiago Cast: Santi Millán, Martina Gusmán, Nicolás Cabré, Antonio Garrido, Dafne Fernández, Mariam Hernández	Buena Vista International	
M A R C H	14	Spanish Affair (Ocho Apellidos Vascos)	Director: Emilio Martínez-Lázaro Cast: Dani Rovira, Clara Lago, Carmen Machi, Karra Elejalde	Universal Pictures	
M A R C H	21	La partida	Director: Antonio Hens Cast: Milton García, Reinier Díaz, Jenifer Rodríguez, Beatriz Méndez, Mirta Ibarra, Luis Alberto García, Toni Cantó	—N/a	
M A R C H	21	La hermandad	Director: Julio Martí Zahonero Cast: Lydia Bosch, Borja Elgea, Manuel Tallafé, Edi Bonet	Olwyn Films	
M A R C H	28	Kamikaze	Director: Álex Pina; Cast: Verónica Echegui, Leticia Dolera, Carmen Machi, Álex García, Héctor Alterio, Iván Massagué, Eduardo Blanco	Warner Bros. Pictures	
M A R C H	28	Enemy	Director: Denis Villeneuve Cast: Jake Gyllenhaal, Mélanie Laurent, Isabella Rossellini, Sarah Gadon	Alfa Pictures	
M A R C H	28	2 francos, 40 pesetas	Director: Carlos Iglesias Cast: Carlos Iglesias, Javier Gutiérrez, Nieve de Medina	Festival Films	
A P R I L	4	Purgatory (Purgatorio)	Director: Pau Teixidor Cast: Oona Chaplin, Sergi Méndez, Andrés Gertrúdix, Ana Fernández	Renoir / CINE365	
A P R I L	11	Nightfall in India (Anochece en la India)	Director: Chema Rodríguez Cast: Juan Diego, Clara Vodă, Javier Pereira	Wanda Visión	
A P R I L	11	Inevitable	Director: Jorge Algora Cast: Federico Luppi, Darío Grandinetti, Mabel Rivera, Carolina Peleritti, Antonella Costa	Splendor Films	
A P R I L	25	The Unexpected Life (La vida inesperada)	Director: Jorge Torregrossa Cast: Javier Cámara, Raúl Arévalo, Carmen Ruiz, Tammy Blanchard, Sarah Sokolovic	Universal Pictures	
A P R I L	30	Carmina and Amen (Carmina y amén)	Director: Paco León Cast: Carmina Barrios, María León, Paco Casaus, Yolanda Ramos	A Contracorriente Films	
M A Y	9	10,000 Nights Nowhere (10.000 noches en ninguna parte)	Director: Ramón Salazar Cast: Lola Dueñas, Andrés Gertrúdix, Najwa Nimri, Susi Sánchez, Andrés Lima	Elamedia	
M A Y	9	The Food Guide to Love (Amor en su punto)	Director: Dominic Harari, Teresa Pelegri Cast: Richard Coyle, Leonor Watling, Ginés García Millán, Simon Delaney, David Wilmot, Lorcan Cranitch, Ger Ryan	Hispano Foxfilm	
M A Y	16	Por un puñado de besos (For a Handful of Kisses)	Director: David Menkes Cast: Ana de Armas, Martiño Rivas, Marina Salas, Megan Montaner, Alejandra Onieva, Joel Bosqued, Jan Cornet, Andrea Duro	eOne Films	
M A Y	16	10,000 km (10.000 km)	Director: Carlos Marques-Marcet Cast: David Verdaguer, Natalia Tena	Avalon	
M A Y	30	Beautiful Youth (Hermosa juventud)	Director: Jaime Rosales; Cast: Ingrid García Jonsson, Carlos Rodríguez, Inma Nieto	Wanda Visión	
M A Y	30	Falling Star (Stella candente)	Director: Lluís Miñarro Cast: Àlex Brendemühl, Lola Dueñas, Bárbara Lennie, Àlex Batllori, Gonzalo Cunill, Francesc Garrido	Splendor Films	
M A Y	30	They Are All Dead (Todos están muertos)	Director: Beatriz Sanchís Cast: Elena Anaya, Angélica Aragón, Nahuel Pérez Biscayart, Cristian Bernal, Patrick Criado, Macarena García, Patricia Reyes Spíndola	Avalon	
J U N E	6	Pancho, el perro millonario	Director: Tom Fernández Cast: Patricia Conde, Ivan Massagué, Secun de la Rosa, Álex O'Dogherty, Armando del Río, Marta Hazas, Manuel Baqueiro, Eloy Azorín, María Castro, David Fernández, Chiqui Fernández	DeAPlaneta	
J U N E	20	Sorry If I Call You Love (Perdona si te llamo amor)	Director: Joaquín Llamas Cast: Daniele Liotti, Paloma Bloyd, Irene Montalà, Jan Cornet, Patricia Vico, Pablo Chiapella, Adrià Collado, Andrea Duro	Emon Films	
J U N E	27	Another Me (Mi otro yo)	Director: Isabel Coixet Cast: Sophie Turner, Rhys Ifans, Claire Forlani, Gregg Sulkin, Leonor Watling, Jonathan Rhys Meyers, Geraldine Chaplin, Ivana Baquero, Zita Sattar	Vértigo Films	
J U L Y	4	Open Windows	Director: Nacho Vigalondo Cast: Elijah Wood, Sasha Grey, Neil Maskell	eOne Films	
J U L Y	11	La cueva	Director: Alfredo Montero Cast: Marcos Ortiz, Marta Castellote, Jorge Páez, Eva García-Vacas, Xoel Fernández	Alfa Pictures	
J U L Y	18	Marseille	Director: Belén Macías Cast: María León, Goya Toledo, Noa Fontanals, Eduard Fernández, Àlex Monner	Syldavia Cinema	
J U L Y	25	The Extraordinary Tale of the Times Table	Director: José F. Ortuño, Laura Alvea Cast: Aïda Ballmann, Ken Appledorn, Mari Paz Sayago	—N/a	
A U G U S T	29	El Niño	Director: Daniel Monzón Cast: Luis Tosar, Jesús Castro, Eduard Fernández, Sergi López, Bárbara Lennie, Ian McShane, Jesús Carroza	Hispano Foxfilm	
S E P T E M B E R	12	Betibú	Director: Miguel Cohan Cast: Mercedes Morán, Alberto Ammann, Daniel Fanego, José Coronado, Osmar Núñez	Syldavia Cinema	
S E P T E M B E R	19	El amor ya no es lo que era	Director: Gabriel Ochoa Cast: Aida Folch, Alberto San Juan, Petra Martínez, Carlos Álvarez-Nóvoa, Blanca Romero, José Coronado, Nicolás Coronado	Premium Cine	
S E P T E M B E R	26	Marshland (La isla mínima)	Director: Alberto Rodríguez Cast: Raúl Arévalo, Javier Gutiérrez, Nerea Barros, Antonio de la Torre	Warner Bros. Pictures	
O C T O B E R	3	Torrente 5: Operación Eurovegas	Director: Santiago Segura Cast: Santiago Segura, Julián López, Jesús Janeiro, Carlos Areces, Angy Fernández, Alec Baldwin, Neus Asensi	Sony Pictures	
O C T O B E R	10	Dioses y perros	Director: David Marqués, Rafa Montesinos; Cast: Hugo Silva, Megan Montaner, Juan Codina, Elio González, Lucía Álvarez	Festival Films	
O C T O B E R	10	Hidden Away (A escondidas)	Director: Mikel Rueda Cast: Sergio Kouh, Germán Alcarazu, Álex Angulo, Ana Wagener	Vértigo Films	
O C T O B E R	17	Magical Girl	Director: Carlos Vermut Cast: Luis Bermejo, Bárbara Lennie, Israel Elejalde, Lucía Pollán, José Sacristán	Avalon	
O C T O B E R	17	Wild Tales (Relatos salvajes)	Director: Damián Szifron; Cast: Ricardo Darín, Leonardo Sbaraglia, Érica Rivas, Julieta Zylberberg, Darío Grandinetti	Warner Bros. Pictures	
O C T O B E R	31	REC 4: Apocalypse	Director: Jaume Balagueró Cast: Manuela Velasco, Paco Manzanedo, Hector Colomé, Críspulo Cabezas	Filmax	
O C T O B E R	31	321 Days in Michigan (321 días en Míchigan)	Director: Enrique García Cast: Salva Reina, David García-Intriago, Virginia Muñoz, Héctor Medina, Chico García, Virginia DeMorata	Cada Films	
N O V E M B E R	7	Justi&Cia	Director: Ignacio Estaregui Cast: Álex Angulo, Marta Larralde, Antonio Dechent, Hovik Keuchkerian	Splendor Films	
N O V E M B E R	14	Escobar: Paradise Lost (Escobar: Paraíso perdido)	Director: Andrea Di Stefano Cast: Benicio Del Toro, Josh Hutcherson, Claudia Traisac, Brady Corbet, Carlos Bardem, Ana Girardot	eOne Films	
N O V E M B E R	21	A esmorga	Director: Ignacio Vilar Cast: Miguel de Lira, Karra Elejalde, Antonio Durán "Morris"	Vía Láctea Filmes	
N O V E M B E R	28	Mortadelo and Filemon: Mission Implausible (Mortadelo y Filemón contra Jimmy el Cachondo)	Director: Javier Fesser	Warner Bros. Pictures	
N O V E M B E R	28	Traces of Sandalwood (Rastres de sàndal)	Director: Maria Ripoll Cast: Nandita Das, Aina Clotet, Rosa Novell, Naby Dakhli	Golem	
N O V E M B E R	28	Fuego	Director: Luis Marías Cast: José Coronado, Aida Folch, Leyre Berrocal	Syldavia Cinema	
D E C E M B E R	25	Shrew's Nest (Musarañas)	Directors: Juan Fernando Andrés, Esteban Roel Cast: Macarena Gómez, Nadia de Santiago, Hugo Silva, Luis Tosar	Sony Pictures	
D E C E M B E R	25	Mr. Kaplan (Kaplan)	Director: Álvaro Brechner Cast: Héctor Noguera, Néstor Guzzini, Nidia Telles, Rolf Becker	Avalon	

== Box office ==
The ten highest-grossing Spanish feature films in 2014, by domestic box office gross revenue, are as follows:

Highest-grossing films of 2014
Rank	Title	Distributor	Admissions	Domestic gross (€)
1	Spanish Affair (Ocho apellidos vascos)	Universal Pictures	9,346,289	55,163,074.90
2	El Niño	Hispano Foxfilm	2,687,841	15,902,862.88
3	Torrente 5: Operación Eurovegas	Sony Pictures	1,803,259	10,592,908.26
4	Exodus: Gods and Kings (Exodus: Dioses y reyes)	Hispano Foxfilm	1,192,386	7,812,067.98
5	Marshland (La isla mínima)	Warner Bros. Pictures	1,030,010	6,126,720.43
6	Mortadelo and Filemon: Mission Implausible (Mortadelo y Filemón contra Jimmy el Cachondo)	Warner Bros. Pictures	695,128	4,480,281.55
7	Wild Tales (Relatos salvajes)	Warner Bros. Pictures	725,702	4,272,739.65
8	Pancho, el perro millonario	DeAPlaneta	459,554	2,507,488.36
9	Carmina and Amen (Carmina y amén)	A Contracorriente Films	391,638	1,976,986.16
10	Three Many Weddings (3 bodas de más) ‡	Warner Bros. Pictures	318,466	1,950,442.72
‡: 2013 theatrical opening

== Notable deaths ==
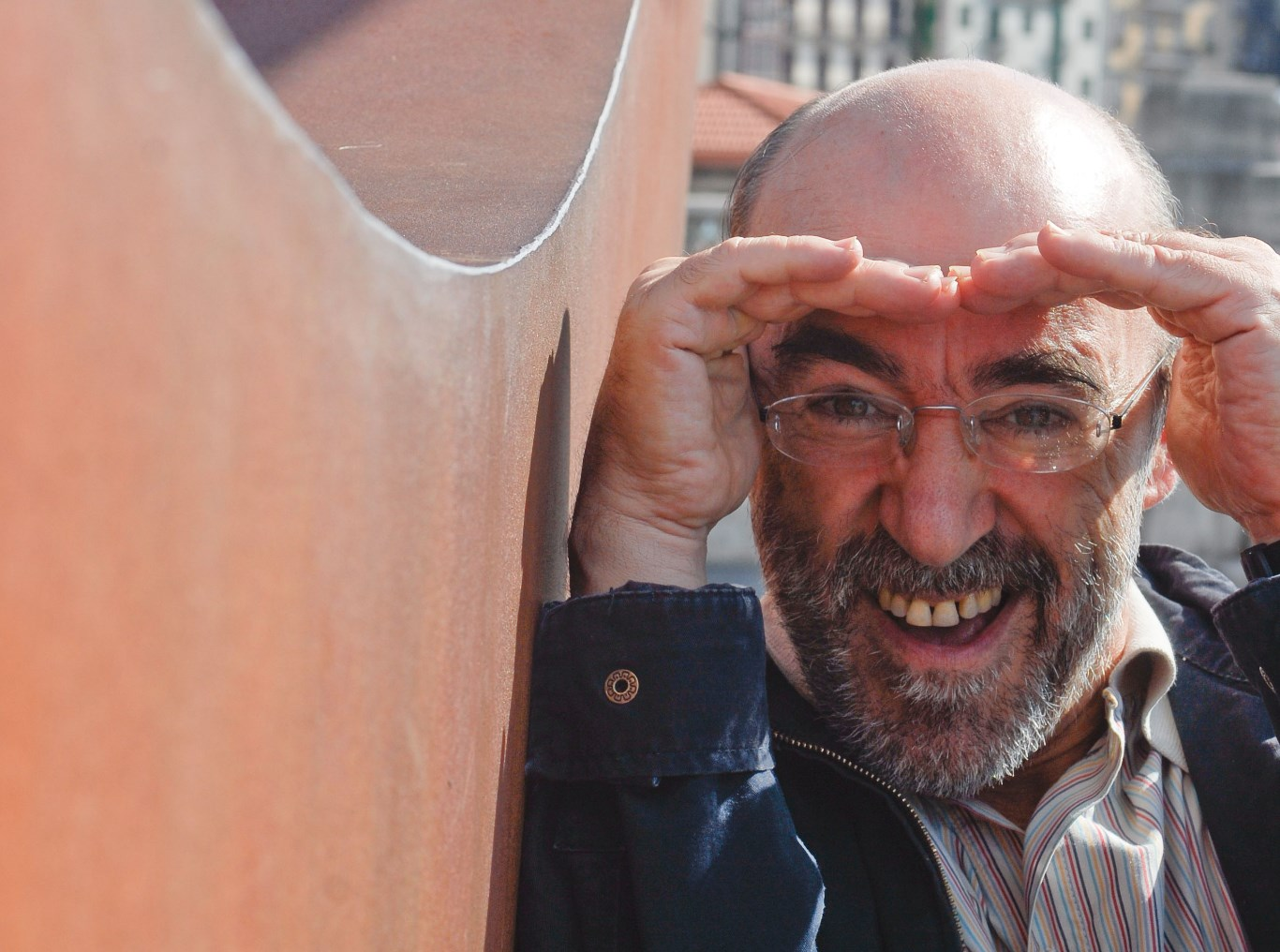
2014 saw the death of Álex Angulo.

Month	Date	Name	Age	Nationality	Profession	Notable films	Ref.
February	28	Dunia Ayaso	53	Spanish	Director and screenwriter	Perdona bonita, pero Lucas me quería a mí; The Island Inside
April	26	Antonio Pica	81	Spanish	Actor	Weeping for a Bandit; The Fall of the Roman Empire
July	20	Álex Angulo	61	Spanish	Actor	The Day of the Beast; Live Flesh; Pan's Labyrinth

== See also ==
- 29th Goya Awards
- 2014 in Spanish television
- List of 2014 box office number-one films in Spain
