= 29th Goya Awards =

- Date: 7 February 2015
- Site: Madrid Marriott Auditorium Hotel, Madrid
- Hosted by: Dani Rovira
- Organized by: Academy of Cinematographic Arts and Sciences of Spain

Highlights
- Best Film: Marshland
- Best Actor: Javier Gutiérrez; Marshland
- Best Actress: Bárbara Lennie; Magical Girl
- Most awards: Marshland (10)
- Most nominations: Marshland (17)

Television coverage
- Network: La 1
- Viewership: 3.84 million (24.7%)

The 29th Goya Awards ceremony, presented by the Academy of Cinematographic Arts and Sciences of Spain, took place at the Madrid Marriott Auditorium Hotel in Madrid on 7 February 2015 to honour the best in Spanish films of 2014. Actor and comedian Dani Rovira was the master of ceremonies. Marshland won ten awards, including Best Film, Best Director, Best Original Screenplay, and Best Actor.

== Background ==
The nominations were read on 7 January 2015 at the Spanish Film Academy headquarters by Kike Maíllo, Marian Álvarez, and Blanca Suárez.

The gala opened with a long musical show (that included the performance of Dúo Dinámico's "Resistiré") with participation from Ana Belén, Eduardo Noriega, Lolita, Miguel Poveda, Hugo Silva, Fran Perea, Dani Rovira, Clara Lago, Asunción Balaguer, Marta Hazas, Andrés Velencoso, Blanca Romero, Blanca Suárez, and Antonio Resines.

Rovira and Adrián Lastra later featured in a tap dance performance while Álex O'Dogherty performed a hybrid of comedy monologue and a musical show.

The live broadcast on La 1 attracted 3,839,000 viewers (24.7% audience share).

== Winners and nominees ==
The winners and nominees are listed as follows:

Best Film: Marshland; El Niño; Loreak; Wild Tales; Magical Girl	Best Director: Alberto Rodríguez – Marshland; Daniel Monzón – El Niño; Carlos Vermut – Magical Girl; Damián Szifrón – Wild Tales
Best Actor: Javier Gutiérrez – Marshland; Raúl Arévalo – Marshland; Ricardo Darín – Wild Tales; Luis Bermejo – Magical Girl	Best Actress: Bárbara Lennie – Magical Girl; María León – Marseille; Macarena Gómez – Shrew's Nest; Elena Anaya – They Are All Dead
Best Supporting Actor: Karra Elejalde – Spanish Affair; Eduard Fernández – El Niño; Antonio de la Torre – Marshland; José Sacristán – Magical Girl	Best Supporting Actress: Carmen Machi – Spanish Affair; Mercedes León – Marshland; Bárbara Lennie – El Niño; Goya Toledo – Marseille
Best New Actor: Dani Rovira – Spanish Affair; David Verdaguer – 10,000 km; Jesús Castro – El Niño; Israel Elejalde – Magical Girl	Best New Actress: Nerea Barros – Marshland; Natalia Tena – 10,000 km; Yolanda Ramos – Carmina and Amen; Ingrid García Jonsson – Beautiful Youth
Best Original Screenplay: Alberto Rodríguez, Rafael Cobos – Marshland; Daniel Monzón, Jorge Guerricaechevarría – El Niño; Carlos Vermut – Magical Girl; Damián Szifrón – Wild Tales	Best Adapted Screenplay: Javier Fesser, Claro García, Cristóbal Ruiz – Mortadelo and Filemon: Mission Implausible; Ignacio Vilar, Carlos Asorey – A esmorga; Chema Rodríguez, Pablo Burgués, David Planell – Nightfall in India; Anna Soler-Pont – Traces of Sandalwood
Best Ibero-American Film: Wild Tales • Argentina/Spain; Mr. Kaplan • Uruguay; Behavior • Cuba; The Longest Distance • Venezuela/Spain	Best European Film: Ida • Poland/Denmark; The Salt of the Earth • France/Brazil; The Hundred-Year-Old Man Who Climbed Out the Window and Disappeared • Sweden; Serial (Bad) Weddings • France
Best New Director: Carlos Marqués-Marcet – 10,000 km; Juanfer Andrés, Esteban Roel – Shrew's Nest; Curro Sánchez Varela – Paco de Lucía: La búsqueda; Beatriz Sanchís – They Are All Dead	Best Animated Film: Mortadelo and Filemon: Mission Implausible; Mummy, I'm a Zombie; La tropa de trapo en la selva del arcoíris
Best Cinematography: Alex Catalán – Marshland; Alejandro Martínez – Automata; Kalo Berridi – Spanish Affair; Carles Gusi – El Niño	Best Editing: José M.G. Moyano – Marshland; Mapa Pastor – El Niño; José M.G. Moyano, Darío García – Paco de Lucía: La búsqueda; Pablo Barbieri, Damián Szifrón – Wild Tales
Best Art Direction: Pepe Domínguez – Marshland; Patrick Salvador – Automata; Antón Laguna – El Niño; Víctor Monigote – Mortadelo and Filemon: Mission Implausible	Best Production Supervision: Edmon Roch, Toni Novella – El Niño; Manuela Ocón – Marshland; Esther García – Wild Tales; Luis Fernández Lago, Julián Larrauri – Mortadelo and Filemon: Mission Implausible
Best Sound: Sergio Bürmann, Marc Orts, Oriol Tarragó – El Niño; Gabriel Gutiérrez – Automata; Daniel de Zayas, Nacho Royo-Villanova, Pelayo Gutiérrez – Marshland; Nicolás de Poulpiquet, James Muñoz – Mortadelo and Filemon: Mission Implausible	Best Special Effects: Raúl Romanillos, Guillermo Orbe – El Niño; Pedro Moreno, Juan Ventura – Marshland; Antonio Molina, Ferrán Piquer – Torrente 5: Operación Eurovegas; Raúl Romanillos, David Heras – Open Windows
Best Costume Design: Fernando García – Marshland; Armaveni Stoyanova – Automata; Tatiana Hernández – El Niño; Cristina Rodríguez – Por un puñado de besos	Best Makeup and Hairstyles: José Quetglas, Carmen Veinat – Shrew's Nest; Raquel Fidalgo, David Martí, Noé Montes – El Niño; Yolanda Piña – Marshland; Marisa Amenta, Néstor Burgos – Wild Tales
Best Original Score: Julio de la Rosa – Marshland; Roque Baños – El Niño; Pascal Gaigne – Loreak; Gustavo Santaolalla – Wild Tales	Best Original Song: India Martínez, Riki Rivera, David Santisteban – "Niño sin miedo" from El Niño; Fernando Merinero, Luis Ivars, Raúl Marín – "Me ducho en tus besos" from Haz de tu vida una obra de arte; Fernando Velázquez – "No te marches jamás" from Spanish Affair; Rafael Arnau – "Morta y File" from Mortadelo and Filemon: Mission Implausible
Best Fictional Short Film: Café para llevar; Loco con ballesta; Trato preferente; Safan; Todo un tuturo juntos	Best Animated Short Film: Juan y la nube; A Life Story; El señor del abrigo interminable; Sangre de unicornio; A Lonely Sun Story
Best Documentary Film: Paco de Lucía: La búsqueda; Nacido en Gaza; Edificio España; El último adiós a Bette Davis	Best Documentary Short Film: Walls (si estas paredes hablasen); El domador de peixos; El último abrazo; La máquina de los rusos

=== Films with multiple nominations and awards ===
Films that received multiple nominations
Nominations	Film
17	Marshland
16	El Niño
9	Wild Tales
7	Magical Girl
6	Mortadelo and Filemon: Mission Implausible
5	Spanish Affair
4	Automata
3	10,000 km
3	Shrew's Nest
3	Paco de Lucía: La búsqueda
2	Loreak
2	Marseille
2	They Are All Dead

Films that received multiple awards
Awards	Film
10	Marshland
4	El Niño
3	Spanish Affair
2	Mortadelo and Filemon: Mission Implausible

== Honorary Goya ==
Antonio Banderas was awarded the Honorary Goya Award.
