= 20th Forqué Awards =

2015 Spanish film and television awards

- Date: 12 January 2015
- Site: Palacio Municipal de Congresos, Madrid, Spain
- Hosted by: Ana Morgade
- Organized by: EGEDA

Highlights
- Best Picture: Marshland
- Best Actor: Javier Gutiérrez; Marshland
- Best Actress: Bárbara Lennie; Magical Girl

Television coverage
- Network: La 1

The 20th Forqué Awards ceremony, presented by EGEDA, was held on 12 January 2015 at the Palacio Municipal de Congresos in Madrid. The gala, broadcast on La 1, was hosted by Ana Morgade.

== History ==
The nominations for all the competitive categories (except for the Best Animation and or Documentary film, to be disclosed without finalists on the gala day) were announced on 18 December 2014 by Manuela Vellés and Raúl Arévalo during an event also attended by Lorena González (ICAA's president) and Enrique González Macho (Spanish Film Academy president). An Argentine-Spanish co-production, Damián Szifrón's Wild Tales was nominated both for Best (Spanish) Film and for Best Latin-American Film.

Organised by EGEDA, the award ceremony was held at the Palacio Municipal de Congresos in Madrid on 12 January 2015. On behalf of Enrique Cerezo, Concha Velasco handed Spanish public broadcaster RTVE the EGEDA Gold Medal in recognition to its contribution to the Spanish film industry.

Hosted by Ana Morgade, the gala featured performances by Café Quijano, Juan Zelada, AlamedaDosoulna, India Martínez, and theatre group Ron Lalá.

== Winners and nominees ==
The winners and nominees are listed as follows:

| Best Film: Marshland; El niño; Magical Girl; Spanish Affair; Wild Tales | Best Latin-American Film: Wild Tales; Cantinflas; Código Paz; The Way He Looks; To Kill a Man; Mr. Kaplan |
| Best Male Performance in a Film: Javier Gutiérrez — Marshland; Raúl Arévalo — Marshland; José Sacristán — Magical Girl; Karra Elejalde — Spanish Affair | Best Female Performance in a Film: Bárbara Lennie — Magical Girl; Elena Anaya — They Are All Dead; Ingrid García-Jonsson — Beautiful Youth; Natalia Tena — 10,000 km |
Best Animation or Documentary Film: Mortadelo and Filemon: Mission Implausible
