= Por un puñado de besos =

- Theatrical release poster
- Directed by: David Menkes
- Screenplay by: David Menkes
- Based on: Un poco de abril, algo de mayo, todo septiembre by Jordi Sierra i Fabra
- Produced by: José Frade
- Starring: Ana de Armas; Martiño Rivas; Marina Salas; Megan Montaner; Joel Bosqued; Alejandra Onieva; Jan Cornet; Andrea Duro
- Cinematography: Néstor Calvo
- Edited by: Esther Cardenal
- Music by: Paco Ortega
- Production companies: José Frade PC; Garra Producciones
- Distributed by: eOne Films Spain (es)
- Release dates: 26 March 2014 (Málaga); 16 May 2014 (Spain)
- Countries: Spain; Venezuela
- Language: Spanish

Por un puñado de besos is a 2014 Spanish-Venezuelan romantic comedy film directed by David Menkes. It stars Ana de Armas and Martiño Rivas as Sol and Dani, alongside Marina Salas, Megan Montaner, Joel Bosqued, Alejandra Onieva, Jan Cornet and Andrea Duro.

== Plot ==
The plot tracks the developments in the romantic relationship between Dani and Sol, both seropositive.

== Cast ==
- Ana de Armas as Sol
- Martiño Rivas as Dani
- Marina Salas as Gloria
- Megan Montaner as Lidia
- Joel Bosqued
- Alejandra Onieva
- Jan Cornet as Darío
- Andrea Duro

== Production ==
Based on the 1993 novel Un poco de abril, algo de mayo y todo septiembre by Jordi Sierra y Fabra, the screenplay was penned by David Menkes. A Spanish-Venezuelan co-production, the film was produced by José Frade PC and Garra Producciones, and it had the participation of RTVE and Telemadrid. Shooting had already begun in Madrid by July 2013. Paco Ortega was responsible for the music, Néstor Calvo for the cinematography and Esther Cardenal for film editing.

== Release ==
The film was presented on 26 March 2014 at the 17th Málaga Film Festival's official competition. Distributed by eOne Films Spain, it was theatrically released in Spain on 16 May 2014.

== Reception ==
Mirito Torreiro of Fotogramas considered that "mawkish, set somewhere out of time (and out of Spanish society, of course)", the film "will only appeal to adolescents with no memory and fans of its protagonists".

Andrea G. Bermejo of Cinemanía underscored the film to be "teen cinema, without moralizing or complexes".

Javier Ocaña of El País wrote that David Menkes "picked up a few major themes and turned them into something inferior, unworthy, shallow and blushing".

== Accolades ==
Year	Award	Category	Nominee(s)	Result	Ref.
2015	29th Goya Awards	Best Costume Design	Cristina Rodríguez	Nominated	

== See also ==
- List of Spanish films of 2014
