= 24th Actors and Actresses Union Awards =

2015 Spanish award ceremony

- Date: 9 March 2015
- Site: Teatro La Latina, Madrid, Spain
- Hosted by: Juanma Cifuentes
- Organized by: Actors and Actresses Union

Highlights
- Honorary career award: José Sacristán

The 24th Actors and Actresses Union Awards ceremony was held on 9 March 2015 at the Teatro La Latina in Madrid. The gala was hosted by Juanma Cifuentes.

In addition to the competitive awards, El tren de la libertad's women received the 'Mujeres en Unión' award, José Sacristán the 'Toda una vida' career award and Matadero Madrid the Special Award.

== Winners and nominees ==
The winners and nominees are listed as follows:

=== Film ===
Best Male Performance in a Leading Role: Javier Gutiérrez — Marshland; Raúl Arévalo — Marshland; Carlos Iglesias — 2 Francos, 40 pesetas	Best Female Performance in a Leading Role: Elena Anaya — Todos están muertos; Clara Lago — Spanish Affair; Manuela Velasco — Rec 4: Apocalypse
Best Male Performance in a Secondary Role: Karra Elejalde — Spanish Affair; Alberto San Juan — The Ignorance of Blood; Críspulo Cabezas — Rec 4: Apocalypse	Best Female Performance in a Secondary Role: Carmen Machi — Spanish Affair; Ana Fernández — Purgatory; Goya Toledo — Marseille
Best Male Performance in a Minor Role: Manolo Solo — Marshland; Antonio de la Torre — Marshland; Sergi López — Dos a la carta	Best Female Performance in a Minor Role: Mercedes León — Marshland; Ana Wagener — Hidden Away; Tina Sainz — 2 Francos, 40 pesetas

=== Television ===
Best Male Performance in a Leading Role: Víctor Clavijo — Cuéntame un cuento: "Los tres cerditos"; Eloy Azorín — Sin identidad; Rodolfo Sancho — Isabel	Best Female Performance in a Leading Role: Michelle Jenner — Isabel; Megan Montaner — Sin identidad; Teresa Hurtado de Ory — Ciega a citas
Best Male Performance in a Secondary Role: Pepe Viyuela — Aída; Borja Luna — Isabel; Eusebio Poncela — Isabel	Best Female Performance in a Secondary Role: Victoria Abril — Sin identidad; Verónica Sánchez — Sin identidad; Ainhoa Santamaría — Isabel
Best Male Performance in a Minor Role: Carlos Hipólito — Hermanos; Jorge Usón — B&b, de boca en boca; Jaime Blanch — Amar es para siempre	Best Female Performance in a Minor Role: Elvira Mínguez — Sin identidad; Elvira Mínguez — Hermanos; Lluvia Rojo — Cuéntame cómo pasó

=== Theatre ===
Best Male Performance in a Leading Role: Miguel Rellán — Novecento. La leyenda del pianista del océano; Ángel Ruiz — Miguel de Molina al desnudo; Sergio Peris-Mencheta — Lluvia constante	Best Female Performance in a Leading Role: Inma Cuevas — Constelaciones; África Gozalbes — Toc toc; Asunción Balaguer — Una vida robada
Best Male Performance in a Secondary Role: Jorge Muriel — Cuando deje de llover; Daniel Muriel — Las heridas del viento; Emilio Gavira — Fausto	Best Female Performance in a Secondary Role: Consuelo Trujillo — Cuando deje de llover; Ana Wagener — Fausto; Inma Cuevas — MBIG [Mcbeth International Group]
Best Male Performance in a Minor Role: Felipe García Vélez— Cuando deje de llover; Daniel Muriel — Los miércoles no existen; Richard Collins-Moore — La llamada	Best Female Performance in a Minor Role: Susi Sánchez — Cuando deje de llover; Belén Cuesta — La llamada; Asunción Balaguer — Ricardo III

=== Newcomers ===
Best New Actor: Héctor Melgares — Caligula; Carlos López — Dorian; Jorge Cabrera — Paquito, lágrimas, mocos y sangre	Best New Actress: Pilar Gil — El zoo de cristal; Carmen Flores Sandoval — Que vaya bonito; Clara Lago — Venus in Fur
