= They Are All Dead =

- Spanish: Todos están muertos
- Directed by: Beatriz Sanchís
- Written by: Beatriz Sanchís
- Produced by: Stefan Schmitz; María Zamora
- Starring: Elena Anaya; Angélica Aragón; Christian Bernal; Nahuel Pérez Biscayart; Patrick Criado
- Cinematography: Álvaro Gutiérrez
- Edited by: Nacho Ruiz Capillas
- Music by: Akrobats
- Production companies: Avalon PC; Animal de Luz; Integral Film
- Distributed by: Avalon DA (es)
- Release dates: 27 March 2014 (Málaga); 30 May 2014 (Spain); 16 October 2015 (Mexico)
- Countries: Spain; Mexico; Germany
- Language: Spanish

They Are All Dead (Spanish: Todos están muertos) is a 2014 drama film with supernatural elements directed and written by Beatriz Sanchís which stars Elena Anaya. It is an international co-production among companies from Spain, Germany and Mexico.

== Plot ==
Set in the 1990s, it refers back to the 1980s, when Lupe, the lead character, was a rock star. In present time, Lupe has agoraphobia. She lives secluded, only in contact with her son Pancho (a boy scout who hates her) and her Mexican mother Paquita. The ghost of her brother Diego breaks into her life.

== Cast ==
- Elena Anaya as Lupe
- Angélica Aragón as Paquita
- Christian Bernal as Pancho
- Nahuel Pérez Biscayart as Diego
- Patrick Criado as Víctor
- Macarena García as Nadia
- Patricia Reyes Spíndola as Doña Rosario

== Production ==
The film is a production by Avalon PC, Integral Film and Animal de Luz, with funding from Ibermedia and Eurimages. Shooting began on 11 February 2013. Shooting locations included Madrid.

== Release ==
The film was presented on 27 March 2014 at the 17th Málaga Film Festival. Distributed by Avalon, the film was theatrically released in Spain on 30 May 2014.

== Reception ==
Mirito Torreiro of Fotogramas gave the film 3 out of 5 stars, considering Elena Anaya (in a role tailor-made for her) to be the best about the film whereas he assessed that the writing needed more work.

Jordi Costa of El País wrote that "it is not a perfect film, but it is a risky debut feature with a strong identity".

Manuel Piñón of Cinemanía rated the film with 2½ out of 5 stars, considering that despite being an "original and bold" film, it is dragged by a forced homage to 'La movida', assessing that the film may have turned to be a "happy anomaly" if it employed less nostalgia and respect to the past.

Reviewing for Excélsior, Lucero Solórzano deemed the film to be a "a good debut by Beatriz Sanchís" and that, writing shortcomings notwithstanding, it works and is watchable.

Reviewing for The Hollywood Reporter, Jonathan Holland considered the film to be "a challengingly offbeat but persuasively imagined “what if” bid to talk about well-worn family themes in an adventurous new way".

== Accolades ==
Year	Award	Category	Nominee(s)	Result	Ref.
2014	17th Málaga Film Festival	Silver Biznaga for Best Actress	Elena Anaya	Won	
2014	17th Málaga Film Festival	Jury's Special Award		Won	
2014	17th Málaga Film Festival	Young Jury's Special Award		Won	
2014	17th Málaga Film Festival	Best Original Soundtrack	Akrobats	Won	
2015	20th Forqué Awards	Best Actress	Elena Anaya	Nominated	
2015	2nd Feroz Awards	Best Actress	Elena Anaya	Nominated	
2015	70th CEC Awards	Best New Director	Beatriz Sanchís	Nominated	
2015	70th CEC Awards	Best Actress	Elena Anaya	Nominated	
2015	29th Goya Awards	Best New Director	Beatriz Sanchís	Nominated	
2015	29th Goya Awards	Best Actress	Elena Anaya	Nominated	
2015	24th Actors and Actresses Union Awards	Best Film Actress in a Leading Role	Elena Anaya	Won	

== See also ==
- List of Spanish films of 2014
- List of Mexican films of 2015
- List of German films of 2014
