= Carmina and Amen =

- Theatrical release poster
- Spanish: Carmina y amén
- Directed by: Paco León
- Screenplay by: Paco León
- Produced by: Paco León; Álvaro Augustin; Ghislain Barrois
- Starring: Carmina Barrios; María León; Paco Casaus; Yolanda Ramos; Teresa Casanova; Mª Paz Sayago
- Cinematography: Juan González
- Edited by: Ana Álvarez Ossorio
- Production companies: Andy Joke; Telecinco Cinema
- Distributed by: A Contracorriente Films
- Release dates: 22 March 2014 (Málaga); 30 April 2014 (Spain)
- Country: Spain
- Language: Spanish

Carmina and Amen (Spanish: Carmina y amén) is a 2014 Spanish comedy film directed by Paco León, starring Carmina Barrios as the title character alongside María León, Paco Casaus, Yolanda Ramos, Teresa Casanova and Mari Paz Sayago. It is a sequel to the 2012 film Carmina or Blow Up.

== Plot ==
The plot takes place in Seville. Following the sudden death of her husband, Carmina decides not to report the death so she could clinch an extra pay.

== Cast ==
- Carmina Barrios as Carmina
- Paco Casaus as Antonio
- María León as María
- Yolanda Ramos as Yoli
- Estefanía de los Santos as Fany
- Manolo Solo as Doctor
- Teresa Casanova as Teresa
- Alejandro León as Alejandro
- Marina León as Marina
- Mari Paz Sayago as Mari Paz
- José Manuel López as José
- Joserra Leza as Ocaso
- Julio Fraga as Fernando
- Ana Ma García as Ani
- Paqui Montoya as Paqui
- Juanfra Romero as El Pitu
- Assane Dath as Roger

== Production ==
The film is an Andy Joke and Telecinco Cinema production, with the participation of Mediaset España and Canal+. It was shot in Seville in 2013. Shooting locations included the Hotel Alfonso XIII and an apartment in Los Remedios.

== Release ==
The film was presented at the 17th Málaga Film Festival on 22 March 2014. Distributed by A Contracorriente Films, it was theatrically released in Spain on 30 April 2014. It grossed around €2 million at the Spanish box office.

== Reception ==
Jonathan Holland of The Hollywood Reporter considered that, compared to the first installment, the film "still feels fresh, but it's also more polished, sharper, and funnier", featuring a thin plot, essentially a device "to allow the larger-than-life Carmina to be herself".

Mirito Torreiro of Fotogramas rated the film 4 out of 5 stars, praising the Paco León's leap forward as a filmmaker, noting that the film preserves a "sharp sociological look", and a "costumbrista and deeply Andalusian humor, but with universal repercussions and echoes", featuring an "extraordinarily effective" supporting cast, chief among them Yolanda Ramos.

Carlos Marañón of Cinemanía also gave 4 stars, assessing that the film picks up the autochthonous folk humor and takes it to a place somewhere close to post-humor, also pointing out at the "incommensurable" performance by Yolanda Ramos, determining the sequel to be "the perfect culmination".

Jordi Batlle Caminal of La Vanguardia wrote that the film is "a sequel that is on par, perhaps even a notch above, the original".

== Accolades ==
Year	Award	Category	Nominee(s)	Result	Ref.
2014	17th Málaga Film Festival	Silver Biznaga for Best Screenplay	Paco León	Won	
2014	17th Málaga Film Festival	Silver Biznaga for Best Supporting Actress	Yolanda Ramos	Won	
2015	2nd Feroz Awards	Best Comedy Film		Won	
2015	2nd Feroz Awards	Best Director	Paco León	Nominated	
2015	2nd Feroz Awards	Best Actress	Carmina Barrios	Nominated	
2015	2nd Feroz Awards	Best Supporting Actress	María León	Nominated	
2015	2nd Feroz Awards	Best Supporting Actress	Yolanda Ramos	Nominated	
2015	2nd Feroz Awards	Best Film Poster		Nominated	
2015	2nd Feroz Awards	Best Trailer		Nominated	
2015	70th CEC Medals	Best Supporting Actress	María León	Nominated	
2015	70th CEC Medals	Best New Actress	Yolanda Ramos	Nominated	
2015	29th Goya Awards	Best New Actress	Yolanda Ramos	Nominated	
2015	27th European Film Awards	Best Comedy		Nominated	

== See also ==
- List of Spanish films of 2014
