= The Unexpected Life =

- Spanish: La vida inesperada
- Directed by: Jorge Torregrossa
- Written by: Elvira Lindo
- Starring: Javier Cámara; Raúl Arévalo; Tammy Blanchard; Carmen Ruiz; Sarah Sokolovic
- Cinematography: Kiko de la Rica
- Music by: Lucio Godoy; Federico Jusid
- Production companies: Ruleta Media; La Vida Inesperada AIE; LVI Inc.
- Distributed by: Universal Pictures (es)
- Release dates: 28 March 2014 (Málaga); 25 April 2014 (Spain)
- Countries: Spain; United States
- Languages: Spanish; English

The Unexpected Life (Spanish: La vida inesperada) is a 2014 Spanish-American comedy-drama film directed by Jorge Torregrossa and written by Elvira Lindo, which stars Javier Cámara, Carmen Ruiz, Raúl Arévalo, Tammy Blanchard and Sarah Sokolovic.

== Plot ==
The plot concerns the developments following the meeting of Juanito (who settled in New York hoping to pursue an acting career), with his cousin (Primo), who arrives in NYC to pay Juanito a visit.

== Cast ==
- Javier Cámara as Juanito
- Carmen Ruiz as Sandra
- Raúl Arévalo as Primo
- Tammy Blanchard as Jojo
- Sarah Sokolovic as Holly
- Gloria Muñoz

== Production ==
A Spanish-American co-production, The Unexpected Life was produced by Ruleta Media and La Vida Inesperada AIE alongside LVI Inc., with the participation of TVE, Canal+ and Cosmopolitan TV, collaboration of Numérica Films and support from ICAA and IVAC. Shooting began in New York City in March 2013.

== Release ==
The film was presented to the main competition of the 17th Málaga Film Festival on 28 March 2014, screened at the Teatro Cervantes. Distributed by Universal Pictures International Spain, the film opened in Spanish theatres on 25 April 2014.

== Reception ==
Jonathan Holland of The Hollywood Reporter considered the film to be "a wasted opportunity, largely because of a script which seems unable to decide whether it wants to deliver romance or reality", while noting that lead performers Cámara and Arévalo do not fail to deliver and the score by Godoy and Jusid "is a terrific piano and orchestra".

Carlos Marañón of Cinemanía rated the film 3½ out of 5 stars, assessing that, in a rare instance of "comedy film taking good people seriously", Torregrossa "has found the perfect bitter tone to make a comedy rise above its jokes", with the "invaluable" help from Carmen Ruiz.

Toni Vall of Ara scored 4 out of 5 stars, deeming The Unexpected Life to be "fatalistic and luminous", "a story in chiaroscuro, tinged with melancholy and inhabited by a beautiful realism".

== Accolades ==
Year	Award	Category	Nominee(s)	Result	Ref.
2015	2nd Feroz Awards	Best Comedy Film		Nominated	
2015	2nd Feroz Awards	Best Actor	Javier Cámara	Nominated	
2015	2nd Feroz Awards	Best Original Music	Lucio Godoy, Federico Jusid	Nominated	
2015	70th CEC Awards	Best Actor	Javier Cámara	Nominated	

== See also ==
- List of Spanish films of 2014
