= Shrew's Nest =

2014 horror thriller film

- Theatrical release poster
- Spanish: Musarañas
- Directed by: Juanfer Andrés; Esteban Roel
- Written by: Juanfer Andrés; Sofía Cuenca
- Produced by: Álex de la Iglesia; Carolina Bang; Kiko Martínez
- Starring: Macarena Gómez; Nadia de Santiago; Hugo Silva; Luis Tosar
- Cinematography: Ángel Amorós
- Edited by: Juanfer Andrés
- Music by: Joan Valent
- Production companies: Pokeepsie Films; Nadie es Perfecto; La Ferme! Productions
- Distributed by: Sony Pictures (es)
- Release dates: 4 September 2014 (Toronto); 25 December 2014 (Spain)
- Running time: 92 minutes
- Countries: Spain; France
- Language: Spanish

Shrew's Nest (Spanish: Musarañas) (Note: Released as Sangre de mi sangre in Mexico, and La habitación del mal in Colombia.) is a 2014 horror thriller film directed by Juanfer Andrés and Esteban Roel, and starring Macarena Gómez, Nadia de Santiago, Hugo Silva and Luis Tosar. It earned three nominations to the 29th Goya Awards, including Gómez for Best Actress.

== Plot ==
The plot is set in the 1950s in an apartment in Madrid. Montse earns her living by working as a seamstress in her apartment. She has lost her youth taking care of her younger sister (referred to as "the girl"), who bring some additional earnings to the household by working at a store outside. Montse is at odds with the prospect of her sister establishing intimate relationships with males, despite the girl actually coming of age. Their mother died during the girl's birth and their father ran away during the War, unable to handle the situation. And so, forced to act as father, mother and older sister, Montse hides from reality, feeding an obsessive, unhinged temperament, likewise experiencing visions of her abusive father mocking her. Suffering from agoraphobia, Montse is unable to get out of the apartment.

Carlos, a neighbor of Montse and the girl, falls down the stairs and looks for help knocking on the apartment's door, and Montse, despite early reluctance, eventually proceeds to drag an unconscious and injured Carlos in. Montse becomes nonetheless infatuated with Carlos, who, wounded in the leg, is unable to move out of bed. During secret meetings of the girl and Carlos, the former advises Carlos to leave the apartment as soon as possible, to no success, as Carlos left the altar on his wedding night and is on the run from commitment to his pregnant fiancée, because he does not want to deal with the responsibilities as a husband and a father. Montse drugs the pain-afflicted Carlos with morphine supplied to her by Doña Puri, a regular client. Upon the attempts to break the impasse, a carnage ensues, as Montse is not willing to let Carlos go, coming to the point of sewing Carlos' leg to the bed. After killing Elisa (Carlos' fiancée, who is looking for him), Doña Puri and the latter's niece, the deranged Montse meets her demise at the hands of the girl, who is trying to facilitate Carlos' escape. In the wake of Montse's last words, the girl finds out that she actually is Montse's daughter, as her grief-stricken father raped Montse time after the death of Montse's mother. Instead of the father running away, Montse saw herself forced to kill him (via food poisoning) to put an end to his abusive and incestuous behavior on Montse herself and her innocent daughter, kept her father's body on her bed for weeks before storing his remains in the armoire, and was too ashamed to tell her the truth.

Out in the hallway, the girl drags Carlos out of her apartment and comforts him. Carlos then asks the girl what her actual name is, in which she whispers her name. Carlos smiles in response and remarks that "it is a beautiful name." The girl then goes back into her apartment and shuts the door as Carlos lies in the hallway barely breathing, his fate left uncertain.

== Cast ==
- Macarena Gómez as Montse
- Nadia de Santiago as la niña
- Hugo Silva as Carlos
- Luis Tosar as padre
- Gracia Olayo as Doña Puri
- Lucía de la Fuente
- Carolina Bang as Elisa
- Silvia Alonso
- Asier Etxeandía
- Tomás del Estal

== Release ==
The film had its world premiere on 4 September 2014, screened on the first day of the 39th Toronto International Film Festival. Distributed by Sony Pictures Releasing España, it was theatrically released in Spain on 25 December 2014.

== Critical reception ==
Shrew's Nest has received generally positive reviews. Jordi Costa wrote for El País, "one could criticize Shrew's Nest for some underlinings and missteps, but it is an energetic debut film, capable of modulating with a good pulse the escalade towards its final excesses." Jonathan Holland of The Hollywood Reporter, while dismissing Hugo Silva's performance as "literally and metaphorically flat", claims that the film is an "enjoyable if unsubtle historical horror featuring a deliciously over-the-top central performance by Macarena Gómez."

On the negative side, Daniel Lobato wrote for eCartelera: "Explaining the reasons that make a failed proposal out of Shrew's Nest would require entering spoiler territory (...), so I will just say that the concord of credibility between viewer and author (...) breaks irreparably as soon as danger raises its head", and also criticizes Silva's performance, claiming that he "should at least have seen The Sea Inside before laying in bed."

== Accolades ==
Awards	Category	Nominated	Result
70th CEC Awards	Best New Director	Juanfer Andrés, Esteban Roel	Won
70th CEC Awards	Best Actress	Macarena Gómez	Nominated
29th Goya Awards	Best Actress	Macarena Gómez	Nominated
29th Goya Awards	Best New Director	Juanfer Andrés & Esteban Roel	Nominated
29th Goya Awards	Best Makeup and Hairstyles	José Quetglas & Carmen Veinat	Won
Fantasy Filmfest 2015	Best film (Fresh Blood Award)		Won

== See also ==
- List of Spanish films of 2014
- List of French films of 2014
