= Cristina Rodríguez (stylist) =

Spanish costume designer

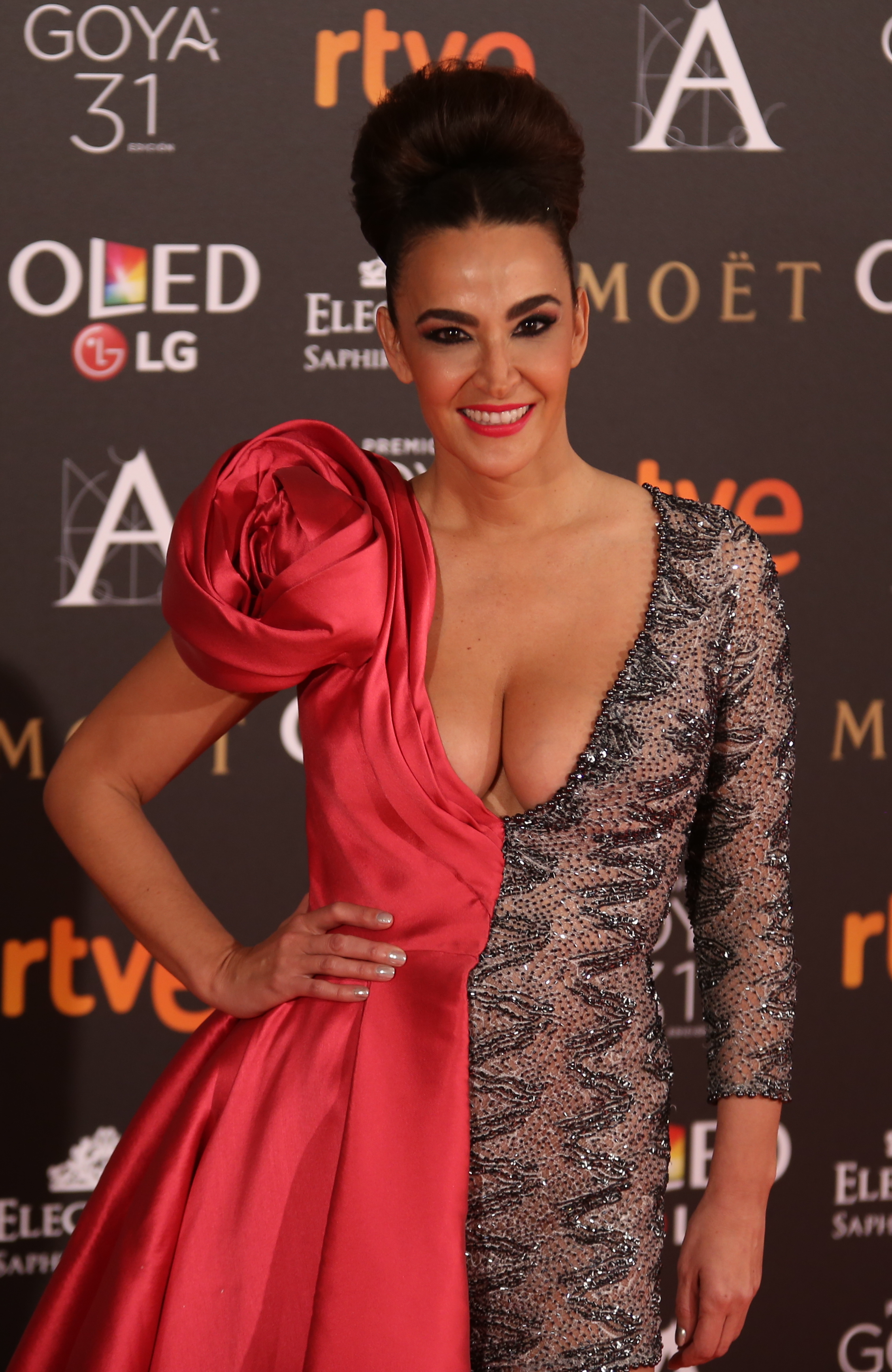
- Cristina Rodríguez in 2017 at 31st Goya Awards
- Born: María Cristina Rodríguez Torres; 5 May 1969 (age 57); Benidorm
- Occupations: Costume designer, stylist, actress and TV personality

María Cristina Rodríguez Torres (born 5 May 1969) is a Spanish costume designer, stylist, actress and television personality. She has been nominated for the Goya Award for Best Costume Design six times for My Heart Goes Boom! (2020), Don't Blame the Karma for Being an Idiot (2016), The Fury of a Patient Man (2016), Por un puñado de besos (2014), Three Many Weddings (2013), and El cónsul de Sodoma (2009). In 2015, she presented the annual New Year's Eve celebration broadcast for Telecinco.

== Filmography ==
=== As costume designer ===
- Mask Singer: Adivina quién canta (2020–present)
- My Heart Goes Boom! (2020)
- HIT (2020)
- Un mundo normal (2020)
- Vivir dos veces (2019)
- Superlópez (2018)
- Elite (2018–2021)
- El aviso (2018)
- Apaches (2015)
- Es por tu bien (2017)
- No culpes al karma de lo que te pasa por gilipollas (2016)
- The Fury of a Patient Man (2016)
- Four Seasons in Havana (2016)
- Anacleto: Agente secreto (2015)
- Ahora o nunca (2015)
- Cómo sobrevivir a una despedida (2015)
- Torrente 5: Operación Eurovegas (2014)
- Marsella (2014)
- Betibú (2014)
- Por un puñado de besos (2014)
- Tres bodas de más (2013)
- Tres 60 (2013)
- Promoción fantasma (2012)
- La chispa de la vida (2011)
- Maktub (2011)
- El sueño de Iván (2011)
- Felipe y Letizia (2010)
- Todo lo que tú quieras (2010)
- El diario de Carlota (2010)
- El dios de madera (2010)
- El cónsul de Sodoma (2009)
- Seven Minutes (2009)
- Un buen hombre (2009)
- Road to Santiago (2009)
- Mentiras y gordas (2009)
- Canciones de amor en Lolita's Club (2007)
- El club de los suicidas (2007)
- Concursante (2007)
- La sombra de nadie (2006)
- Isi & Disi, alto voltaje (2006)
- Skizo (2006)
- Locos por el sexo (2006)
- Mis estimadas víctimas (2005)
- El penalti más largo del mundo (2005)
- Frío sol de invierno (2004)
- El coche de pedales (2004)
- Entre cien fuegos (2002)
- Cásate conmigo, Maribel (2002)
- Mi casa es tu casa (2002)
- Carne de gallina (2001)
- Buñuel y la mesa del rey Salomón (2001)
- Juego de Luna (2001)
- Me da igual (2000)
- Courage (1999)
- Mambí (1998)
- Entre naranjos (1998)
- La duquesa roja (1997)
- Adiós, tiburón (1996)
- Gimlet (1995)

=== As actress ===
- No culpes al karma de lo que te pasa por gilipollas (2016) as Cristina Rodríguez
- Ahora o nunca (2015) as Azafata compañia aérea
- Cómo sobrevivir a una despedida (2015) as Chica Organización
- Marsella (2014) as Prostituta
- Tres bodas de más (2013) as Mujer Boda Alex
- El dios de madera (2010)
- Seven Minutes (2009) as Mujer Virgo
- Cuestión de sexo (2007)
- La sombra de nadie (2006)
- Isi & Disi, alto voltaje (2006) as Hermanas del Perpetuo Tormento
