= Two Tough Guys =

- Film poster
- Spanish: Dos tipos duros
- Directed by: Juan Martínez Moreno
- Screenplay by: Juan Martínez Moreno
- Story by: Antonio Saura; Juan Martínez Moreno
- Starring: Antonio Resines; Elena Anaya; Rosa Mª Sardá; Jordi Vilches
- Cinematography: Gonzalo F. Berridi
- Edited by: Javier Laffaille
- Music by: Álex Martínez
- Production companies: Ensueño Films; Zebra Producciones; Impala
- Distributed by: Buena Vista International
- Release dates: May 2003 (Málaga); 5 September 2003 (Spain)
- Country: Spain
- Language: Spanish

Two Tough Guys (Spanish: Dos tipos duros) is a 2003 Spanish black comedy thriller film directed by Juan Martínez Moreno which stars Antonio Resines, Elena Anaya, Rosa María Sardá, and Jordi Vilches.

== Plot ==
The plot tracks the mishaps of Paco, a vulgar thug, forced to teach the ropes of the criminal world to clumsy Álex, the nephew of the mobster Paco owes money to, proceeding to kidnap a butcher, while enlisting the help of young hooker Tatiana.

== Cast ==
- Antonio Resines as Paco
- Manuel Alexandre as Don Rodrigo
- Jordi Vilches as Álex
- Elena Anaya as Tatiana
- Rosa María Sardá as Aramís
- Mariola Fuentes as Reme
- Jaime Blanch as Don Reinaldo Peña
- Fele Martínez as Bebe
- Joan Crosas as Víctor

== Production ==
The film was produced by Zebra Producciones alongside Ensueño Films and Impala.

== Release ==
The film was presented in the official competition of the 6th Málaga Film Festival in May 2003.

== Reception ==
Jonathan Holland of Variety assessed that the film, "an energetic, good looking comedy-thriller that for sheer professionalism is a cut or two above most Spanish stabs at the genre" "may not offer anything new but what it does, it does well".

Mirito Torreiro of Fotogramas rated the film 4 out of 5 stars, deeming it to be a "healthy, surprising and welcome" debut film.

== See also ==
- List of Spanish films of 2003
