= Purgatory (2014 film) =

- Theatrical release poster
- Spanish: Purgatorio
- Directed by: Pau Teixidor
- Screenplay by: Luis Moreno
- Produced by: Enrique López Lavigne; Jesús Ulled Nadal; Belén Atienza; Mikel Lejarza; Mercedes Gamero
- Starring: Oona Chaplin; Sergi Méndez; Andrés Gertrúdix; Ana Fernández
- Cinematography: Jon Domínguez
- Edited by: Raúl de Torres
- Production companies: Apaches Entertainment; Atresmedia Cine; CINE365
- Distributed by: Renoir/CINE365
- Release dates: 28 March 2014 (Málaga); 4 April 2014 (Spain)
- Country: Spain
- Language: Spanish

Purgatory (Spanish: Purgatorio) is a 2014 Spanish horror thriller film directed by Pau Teixidor in his feature debut which stars Oona Chaplin alongside Sergi Méndez, Andrés Gertrúdix, and Ana Fernández.

== Plot ==
After installing in her new residence with her partner Carlos, Marta sees herself forced to look after Daniel, her neighbor's son, whilst Carlos is doing a night shift. Daniel, otherwise displaying an erratic behaviour, claims that there is another kid hidden in the house that only he is able to see.

== Cast ==
- Oona Chaplin as Marta
- Sergi Méndez as Daniel
- Andrés Gertrúdix as Carlos
- Ana Fernández as Vecina

== Production ==
The film is an Apaches Entertainment, Atresmedia Cine, and CINE365 production, and it had the participation of Orange, Vértice 360 and Tres60. It was shot in Seseña in December 2013.

== Release ==
The film premiered at the Málaga Film Festival's main competition in March 2014. Distributed by Renoir and CINE365, it was theatrically released in Spain on 4 April 2014. The film was also selected for screening at the 2014 Fantastic Fest.

== Reception ==
Jonathan Holland of The Hollywood Reporter assessed that the "high-atmosphere, low-event psychological horror debut" features "plenty of claustrophobic atmosphere and a committed central performance [that] can't make up for Purgatory's failure to exploit its material".

Manuel Piñón of Cinemanía rated the film 3½ out of 5 stars, considering that Chaplin manages to uplift the film "from being a more than adequate exercise in style" to "an intense experience, a passage through terror in which you never want to let go of her hand".

Pere Vall of Fotogramas rated the film 3 out of 5 stars deeming it to be more of a suspense film than a horror film, citing its "forays into adolescent sexuality" as a positive element.

== Accolades ==
Year	Award	Category	Nominee(s)	Result	Ref.
2015	24th Actors and Actresses Union Awards	Best Film Actress in a Secondary Role	Ana Fernández	Nominated	

== See also ==
- List of Spanish films of 2014
