= Gipsy King =

- Spanish: Rey gitano
- Directed by: Juanma Bajo Ulloa
- Screenplay by: Juanma Bajo Ulloa
- Starring: Manuel Manquiña; Karra Elejalde; Arturo Valls; María León; Rosa Mª Sardá; Charo López; Pilar Bardem; Albert Pla
- Cinematography: José Luis Bernal
- Edited by: Javier Martín Penagos
- Music by: Kike Suárez-Alba
- Production companies: RH Cinema; Frágil Zinema
- Distributed by: eOne Films Spain
- Release date: 17 July 2015
- Country: Spain
- Language: Spanish

Gipsy King (Spanish: Rey gitano) is a 2015 Spanish comedy road movie written and directed by Juanma Bajo Ulloa. The cast features Manuel Manquiña, Karra Elejalde, Arturo Valls, María León, Rosa María Sardá, Charo López, Pilar Bardem and Albert Pla.

== Plot ==
Two failed and unemployed investigators, Primitivo and Jose Mari (caricatures of the so-called Two Spains), meet up with Gaje, a gypsy scoundrel, pretending to be a bastard son of the King of Spain. They travel throughout Spain to fulfill the mission tasked by Gaje, set on becoming king.

== Cast ==
- Manuel Manquiña as Primitivo
- Karra Elejalde as Jose Mari
- Arturo Valls as Gaje
- María León as Dolores
- Rosa María Sardá as Malaescusa
- Charo López as Merceditas
- Pilar Bardem as La Chata
- Albert Pla as Junior
- Santiago Segura as Conde de Segura
- Gorka Aguinagalde as Topo
- Santi Ugalde as Julián
- Rosario Pardo as Lola
- Ernesto Sevilla as Mariano
- Manuel Molina as Patriarca

== Production ==
The film is a RH Cinema and Frágil Zinema production. Shooting began in July 2014 in Vitoria-Gasteiz and surrounding locations of Álava, moving then to Madrid, wrapping in the province of Málaga (including Málaga and Genalguacil) already by September 2014.

== Release ==
Distributed by eOne Films Spain, Gipsy King was theatrically released in Spain on 17 July 2015.

== Reception ==
Pere Vall of Fotogramas gave a 2 out of 5 stars score, pointing out at an editing full of loopholes, a clutter of badly executed climaxes, overacted performances, otherwise drawing out Arturo Valls' performance from those by the rest of the cast as a positive point.

Carlos Marañón of Cinemanía rated the film 3½ out of 5 stars, writing about the "supreme" performances by Elejalde and Manquiña, nailing what is expected of them, "perverting idioms to the point of paroxysm".

Javier Ocaña of El País considered the film's problem to be that, except for the sequences featuring Karra Elejalde and Manuel Manquiña (uplifted by a "stupendous" writing by Bajo Ulloa), "almost nothing works", due to the lack of genius and—boldness notwithstanding—for being "much less audacious than it appears on the surface".

M.J. Lombardo of Diario de Sevilla noted that while the plot premise could be somewhat amusing and that bringing in a duo of investigators performed by Manquiña and Elejalde was not a bad idea, "almost nothing else works organically in this redundant and cumulative road movie".

== See also ==
- List of Spanish films of 2015
