= El Niño (film) =

2014 film directed by Daniel Monzón

- Theatrical release poster
- Directed by: Daniel Monzón
- Screenplay by: Daniel Monzón; Jorge Guerricaechevarría
- Produced by: Álvaro Augustin; Ghislain Barrois; Edmon Roch; Javier Ugarte; Borja Pena
- Starring: Luis Tosar; Jesús Castro; Eduard Fernández; Sergi López; Bárbara Lennie; Jesús Carroza; Saed Chatiby; Moussa Maaskri; Mariam Bachir; Ian McShane
- Cinematography: Carles Gusi
- Edited by: Mapa Pastor
- Music by: Roque Baños
- Production companies: Telecinco Cinema; Ikiru Films; Vaca Films; La Ferme! Productions; Maestranza Films
- Distributed by: 20th Century Fox (Spain); StudioCanal (France)
- Release date: 29 August 2014 (Spain)
- Running time: 136 minutes
- Countries: Spain; France
- Language: Spanish

El Niño (English: The Kid) is a 2014 Spanish-French action thriller film directed by Daniel Monzón which stars Luis Tosar and Jesús Castro alongside Eduard Fernández, Sergi López, Bárbara Lennie, and Ian McShane.

== Plot ==
The story is set in the Strait of Gibraltar. It tells the initiation of two youngsters in the world of drug trafficking. At the same time, two police agents, specialized in dismantling drug trafficking networks, are investigating this ring.

== Cast ==
- Jesús Castro as Niño
- Luis Tosar as Jesús
- Sergi López as Vicente
- Bárbara Lennie as Eva
- Ian McShane as the Englishman
- Eduard Fernández as Sergio
- Mariam Bachir as Amina
- Jesús Carroza as Compi
- Saed Chatiby as Halil
- Moussa Maaskri as Rachid
- Luka Peroš as Murat

== Production ==
The film was produced by Telecinco Cinema, Ikiru Films and Vaca Films, alongside La Ferme! Productions, and in association with Maestranza Films. Shooting locations included Gibraltar (the Cable Car).

== Release ==
It premiered in Spain on 29 August 2014.

== Reception ==
=== Accolades ===
Year	Award	Category	Nominee(s)	Result	Ref.
2015	2nd Feroz Awards	Best Supporting Actor	Jesús Carroza	Nominated	
2015	2nd Feroz Awards	Best Supporting Actor	Eduard Fernández	Nominated	
2015	2nd Feroz Awards	Best Original Soundtrack	Roque Baños	Nominated	
2015	7th Gaudí Awards	Best Film Not in the Catalan Language		Nominated	
2015	7th Gaudí Awards	Best Director	Daniel Monzón	Nominated	
2015	7th Gaudí Awards	Best Screenplay	Daniel Monzón, Jorge Guerricaechevarría	Nominated	
2015	7th Gaudí Awards	Best Actor	Jesús Castro	Nominated	
2015	7th Gaudí Awards	Best Actor	Luis Tosar	Nominated	
2015	7th Gaudí Awards	Best Supporting Actress	Bárbara Lennie	Won	
2015	7th Gaudí Awards	Best Supporting Actor	Eduard Fernández	Won	
2015	7th Gaudí Awards	Best Supporting Actor	Sergi López	Nominated	
2015	7th Gaudí Awards	Best Production Supervision	Edmon Roch, Toni Novella	Won	
2015	7th Gaudí Awards	Best Art Direction	Antón Laguna	Nominated	
2015	7th Gaudí Awards	Best Editing	Mapa Pastor	Won	
2015	7th Gaudí Awards	Best Original Music	Roque Baños	Won	
2015	7th Gaudí Awards	Best Cinematography	Carles Gusi	Won	
2015	7th Gaudí Awards	Best Sound	Sergio Bürmann, Oriol Tarragó, Marc Orts	Won	
2015	7th Gaudí Awards	Best Special/Digital Effects	Guillermo Orbe, David Martí, Montse Ribé, Raúl Romanillos	Nominated	
2015	70th CEC Awards	Best Film		Won	
2015	70th CEC Awards	Best Director	Daniel Monzón	Nominated	
2015	70th CEC Awards	Best Original Screenplay	Daniel Monzón, Jorge Guerricaechevarría	Nominated	
2015	70th CEC Awards	Best Supporting Actor	Jesús Carroza	Nominated	
2015	70th CEC Awards	Best Supporting Actress	Bárbara Lennie	Nominated	
2015	70th CEC Awards	Best New Actor	Jesús Castro	Nominated	
2015	70th CEC Awards	Best Cinematography	Carles Gusi	Nominated	
2015	70th CEC Awards	Best Editing	Cristina Pastor	Nominated	
2015	70th CEC Awards	Best Music	Roque Baños	Nominated	
2015	29th Goya Awards	Best Film		Nominated	
2015	29th Goya Awards	Best Director	Daniel Monzón	Nominated	
2015	29th Goya Awards	Best Original Screenplay	Daniel Monzón, Jorge Guerricaechevarría	Nominated	
2015	29th Goya Awards	Best Supporting Actor	Eduard Fernández	Nominated	
2015	29th Goya Awards	Best Supporting Actress	Bárbara Lennie	Nominated	
2015	29th Goya Awards	Best New Actor	Jesús Castro	Nominated	
2015	29th Goya Awards	Best Cinematography	Carles Gusi	Nominated	
2015	29th Goya Awards	Best Editing	Mapa Pastor	Nominated	
2015	29th Goya Awards	Best Art Direction	Antón Laguna	Nominated	
2015	29th Goya Awards	Best Production Supervision	Edmon Roch, Toni Novella	Won	
2015	29th Goya Awards	Best Sound	Sergio Bürmann, Marc Orts, Oriol Tarragó	Won	
2015	29th Goya Awards	Best Special Effects	Raúl Romanillos, Guillermo Orbe	Won	
2015	29th Goya Awards	Best Costume Design	Tatiana Hernández	Nominated	
2015	29th Goya Awards	Best Makeup and Hairstyles	Raquel Fidago, David Martí, Noé Montés	Nominated	
2015	29th Goya Awards	Best Original Score	Roque Baños	Nominated	
2015	29th Goya Awards	Best Original Song	"Niño sin miedo" by India Martínez, Riki Rivera, David Santisteban	Won	

== See also ==
- List of Spanish films of 2014
