= Traces of Sandalwood =

- Film poster
- Catalan: Rastres de sàndal
- Directed by: María Ripoll
- Screenplay by: Anna Soler-Pont
- Based on: Traces of Sandalwood by Asha Miró and Anna Soler-Pont
- Produced by: Pontas Films
- Starring: Nandita Das; Aina Clotet; Naby Dakhli; Subodh Maskara
- Edited by: Irene Blecua
- Music by: Zeltia Montes; Simon Smith; Reewa Rathod (Tandaana)
- Release date: 28 November 2014
- Running time: 95 minutes
- Country: Spain
- Languages: English; Catalan

Traces of Sandalwood (Catalan: Rastres de sàndal) is a 2014 Spanish drama film produced by Pontas Films, directed by María Ripoll and shot in Barcelona and Mumbai with Nandita Das as Mina and Aina Clotet as Sita/Paula. The film is from Pontas Films and is the adaptation of international bestseller Traces of Sandalwood, the tale of a Bollywood star's search for her long lost sister.

The film was released in Spain on 28 November 2014.

Reewa Rathod makes her international debut with this film which has her composing one of the songs in the film, Tandaana.

== Plot ==
The film begins in high drama as 6-year-old Mina (Vaibhavi Hankare) saves her newborn sister, Sita, from being drowned as an unwanted female, thereupon taking full responsibility for her care. But when their mother dies a few years later, their father hands them over to a woman from the city. Sita is left with nuns, despite her sister's frantic resistance, and young Mina is consigned to a brothel, from which she narrowly escapes. She finds work as a maid for a rich family, gaining an ally in Sanjay, the handsome son of the house.

This melodramatic opener is suddenly revealed as a film-within-the-film, an autobiographical opus that Mina (Nandita Das), now a Bollywood superstar, is making with her director husband (the self-same Sanjay, now played by Subodh Maskara). The film marks the latest effort in Mina's unending 30-year search for her missing sister.

Mina finally locates Sita in Barcelona and travels with Sanjay to be reunited with her. But little Sita has grown into a cold, remote scientist named Paula (Aina Clotet), who is totally unaware that she was even adopted, much less that she is of Indian descent. Flatly unreceptive, Paula angrily and summarily rejects Mina and her story. But a tense discussion with her adoptive parents and Mina's extensive documentation lead her to reluctantly entertain some curiosity about her roots and venture into an Indian video store. There, she meets Prakash (Naby Dakhli), who introduces her to her sister's films, and whose openness and quiet persistence, combined with Paula's sudden cinematic immersion in a vibrant culture, gradually wear down her defensiveness.

== Cast ==
- Nandita Das as Mina
- Aina Clotet as Paula
- Naby Dakhli as Prakash
- Vaibhavi Hankare as Young Mina
- Subodh Maskara as Sanjay
- Rosa Novell as Paula's Mother

== Music ==
The score was composed by Zeltia Montes and Simon Smith, each composer dealing with different sections of the drama. The score was nominated for the Catalan Film Academy's 2015 Gaudí Awards. The film won best picture at the same awards.

The film also features several songs: "Far Away" by Anita Zengeza, "Vestida De Nit" by Silvia Pérez Cruz, and Tandaana, especially composed for the film by the young composer and singer Reewa Rathod.

== Locations ==
The film was shot mainly in Barcelona and Mumbai.

== See also ==
- List of Spanish films of 2014
