= Nightfall in India =

- Theatrical release poster
- Spanish: Anochece en la India
- Romanian: Noaptea vine în India
- Directed by: Chema Rodríguez
- Screenplay by: Chema Rodríguez; David Planell; Pablo Burgués
- Starring: Juan Diego; Clara Vodă; Javier Pereira; Linda Molin
- Cinematography: Alex Catalán; Juan González
- Edited by: José Manuel García Moyano
- Music by: Hans Lundgren
- Production companies: Producciones Sin un Duro; Jaleo Films; Strada Film; ATMO Independent Films
- Distributed by: Wanda Vision
- Release dates: 27 March 2014 (Málaga); 11 April 2014 (Spain)
- Countries: Spain; Romania; Sweden
- Languages: Spanish; English; Romanian; Swedish

Nightfall in India (Spanish: Anochece en la India; Romanian: Noaptea vine în India) is a 2014 road movie directed by Chema Rodríguez which stars Juan Diego, Clara Vodă, and Javier Pereira. It is a Spanish-Romanian-Swedish international co-production.

== Plot ==
The plot tracks Ricardo, an elderly wheelchair-using man with a degenerative disease who decides to make a journey to India in a ramshackle van with the company of his Romanian caretaker Dana, picking up a Swedish hitchhiker along the way.

== Cast ==
- Juan Diego as Ricardo
- Clara Vodă as Dana
- Javier Pereira as Saúl
- Linda Molin as Karin
- Ken Appledorn

== Production ==
The screenplay was penned by Chema Rodríguez, David Planell, and Pablo Burgués. The film is a Spanish-Romanian-Swedish co-production by Producciones Sin un Duro, Jaleo Films, Strada Film, and ATMO Independent Films, with the participation of Canal Sur and the backing from ICAA, Junta de Andalucía, CNC, SFI, FiV, and Eurimages. It was lensed by Álex Catalán and Juan González and scored by Hans Lundgren. Shooting took place from 2012 to 2013 in Spain (Seville and the Tabernas Desert), Romania (Bucharest), Turkey (Istanbul and Capadocia), and India (Dholpur). Dialogue is in Spanish, English, Romanian, and Swedish.

== Release ==
The film was presented at the 17th Málaga Film Festival on 27 March 2014. It was released theatrically in Spain on 11 April 2014.

== Reception ==
Jonathan Holland of The Hollywood Reporter wrote that the "absorbing depiction of the relationship between two outsiders is the best thing about this otherwise unconvincing drama".

Mirito Torreiro of Fotogramas rated the film 3 out of 5 stars, singling out the chemistry between Juan Diego and Vodă as the best thing about the film.

Mihai Fulger of Observator Cultural deemed the encounter between "two great actors" (Juan Diego and Clara Vodă) to be the film's main attraction.

== Accolades ==
| Year | Award | Category | Nominee(s) | Result | Ref. |
|---|---|---|---|---|---|
| 2014 | 17th Málaga Film Festival | Silver Biznaga for Best Actor | Juan Diego | Won | |
| 2014 | 17th Málaga Film Festival | Silver Biznaga for Best Editing | José Manuel García Moyano | Won | |
| 2015 | 29th Goya Awards | Best Adapted Screenplay | Chema Rodríguez, David Planell, Pablo Burgués | Nominated | |

== See also ==
- List of Spanish films of 2014
