= Marshland (film) =

- Theatrical release poster
- Spanish: La isla mínima
- Directed by: Alberto Rodríguez
- Screenplay by: Rafael Cobos; Alberto Rodríguez
- Produced by: José Antonio Félez; José Sánchez Montes; Mikel Lejarza; Mercedes Gamero
- Starring: Raúl Arévalo; Javier Gutiérrez; Antonio de la Torre; Nerea Barros; Salva Reina; Jesús Castro; Manolo Solo
- Cinematography: Alex Catalán
- Edited by: José M. G. Moyano
- Music by: Julio de la Rosa
- Production companies: Atípica Films; Sacromonte Films; Atresmedia Cine
- Distributed by: Warner Bros. Pictures
- Release dates: 20 September 2014 (Zinemaldia); 26 September 2014 (Spain)
- Running time: 105 minutes
- Country: Spain
- Language: Spanish
- Budget: €4 million
- Box office: $8.9 million

Marshland (Spanish: La isla mínima, transl. 'The Tiny Island') is a 2014 Spanish thriller film directed by Alberto Rodríguez which stars Javier Gutiérrez and Raúl Arévalo. The film was presented at the 62nd San Sebastián International Film Festival on 20 September 2014. It swept the 29th Goya Awards, winning ten categories, including Best Film, Director, Original Screenplay, and Leading Actor (Gutiérrez).

== Plot ==
In 1980, Madrid homicide detectives Pedro Suárez and Juan Robles are sent to a "backwater" town on the Guadalquivir Marshes in Spain's "Deep South" to investigate the disappearance of two teenage sisters (Carmen and Estrella) during the town's festivities. Pedro, openly critical of Spain's past during the Francoist Dictatorship, has a problem with authority figures, while Juan seems not to care, though he has a troubled past of his own.

The detectives meet with the girls' father, Rodrigo, a local riverboat skipper. Although Rodrigo and his wife Rocío say that their daughters were average girls, the duo hear from the local police that they were known for their promiscuity, and from their friends that they had a deep urge to leave the town. Rocío also gives the detectives a burnt film reel she has found, depicting the girls naked and in bed with a man whose face is obscured by a flash. Soon enough, both Carmen and Estrella are found dead and dumped in the local marsh, having been raped and tortured to death.

Troubled and with no leads, the two detectives attempt to spy on Quini, the handsome and suave former boyfriend of Carmen. Quini, now dating another town girl, Marina, manages to sneak up on the detectives after they have followed him and attempts to threaten them with a knife. After disarming and sending him away, the two agree that Quini must be part of whatever is occurring. The problem proves to be even bigger after a drunk man named Castro tells the detectives about a similar case: his girlfriend, Beatriz, was close to Quini and the sisters, and was found dismembered in the marshes, her suitcase floating there.

Pedro and Juan continue to investigate, gradually unravelling secrets. It is revealed that the riverboats and marshes are being used to smuggle and transport heroin, and that Rodrigo had stolen a kilo and sold it, getting him in trouble with the locals. However, the locals involved in the drugs seek out the detectives, revealing their participation in drug smuggling in full but claiming they had nothing to do with the sisters' deaths. One of the men does aid the investigation, however, by describing a white Dyane 6 he saw at the church where one of the girls' purse was found. After digging through more victims' items, the two see a pattern of out-of-town job brochures for women, eventually linking Quini to a man named Sebastián. Digging through Sebastián's past, they find a warrant out for him for the possible sexual molestation of a child, solidifying his chance of being the main culprit. Juan and Pedro deduce that Quini and Sebastián were luring the young women of the town, who were aching to leave and find their own independence through work, by passing these brochures around and then entrapping them into sexual slavery at a local hunting lodge.

Waters grow murky, however, when Pedro becomes aware of Juan's past shooting of a girl at a protest during the Franco Era. Pedro is also angered after a possible third culprit, a local factory owner named Alfonso Corrales, is brushed over, most likely due to complex political ties. The two continue on, though, eventually deducing Sebastián's cover as the watchman of the hunting lodge. Pedro attempts to follow and observe Sebastián's white Dyane 6, but loses him. With the help of a local poacher named Jesús, the trio finally chases Sebastián into the marshes. All three are shot by the sniping Sebastián, though as he is about to slay Pedro, Juan is able to sneak up and stab him, which he does repeatedly, in a state. After Sebastián falls dead into the swamp, Juan opens the trunk of the car to rescue a bruised but still alive Marina.

The town is brought peace after the case is solved, as well as by the local worker's union accepting a pay raise (which in principle, they felt was too low). All seems well for the detectives, too, as Pedro sees a promotion and relocation closer to his own home and wife. On the final night of their stay, however, Pedro receives photographs from a journalist who has helped on the case. Though Juan justified his shooting story by saying it was his former partner's actions, the journalist reveals that he had in fact been a brutal officer in Franco's notorious secret police, and to have once been known as "The Crow".

In the morning, before they drive home, Juan asks a stoney-faced Pedro if they "are good". Pedro does not answer, and the two ride off to an uncertain future.

== Cast ==
- Raúl Arévalo as Pedro Suárez
- Javier Gutiérrez as Juan Robles
- Antonio de la Torre as Rodrigo
- Nerea Barros as Rocío
- Jesús Castro as Joaquín Varela, "Quini"
- Mercedes León as Mrs. Casa Soto
- Adelfa Calvo as Fernanda
- Manolo Solo as a journalist
- Salvador Reina as Jesús
- Jesús Carroza as Miguel
- Juan Carlos Villanueva as Judge Andrade
- Alberto González as Alfonso Corrales
- Manuel Salas as Sebastián Rovira
- Cecilia Villanueva as María
- Ana Tomeno as Marina

== Critical reception ==
The film received mostly positive reviews. It has a critic approval rating of 92% on the review aggregator Rotten Tomatoes, with an average rating of 7.72/10, based on 36 reviews. The website's critics consensus reads: "As narratively taut as it is richly atmospheric, Marshland keeps viewers guessing throughout a procedural thriller with surprising nuance." Critics have hailed Marshland as one of the best Spanish films of 2014, and have defined it as a suffocating cop thriller with a subtle sociopolitical subplot. They have also pointed out reminiscences of American series True Detective in the star power of the main actors and the environment of the film, although the film began to be recorded before the series' release. Jay Weissberg of Variety deemed the film to be "a satisfyingly atmospheric neo-noir", even if it ultimately disappoints in its denouement, leaving many questions unanswered.

== Accolades ==
Year	Award	Category	Nominee(s)	Result	Ref.
2014	62nd San Sebastián International Film Festival	Golden Shell for Best Film		Nominated	
2014	62nd San Sebastián International Film Festival	Silver Shell for Best Actor	Javier Gutiérrez	Won	
2014	62nd San Sebastián International Film Festival	Jury Prize for Best Cinematography	Álex Catalán	Won	
2014	62nd San Sebastián International Film Festival	Feroz Zinemaldia Award		Won	
2015	20th Forqué Awards	Best Fiction Picture		Won	
2015	20th Forqué Awards	Best Actor	Javier Gutiérrez	Won	
2015	20th Forqué Awards	Best Actor	Raúl Arévalo	Nominated	
2015	2nd Feroz Awards	Best Drama		Won	
2015	2nd Feroz Awards	Best Director	Alberto Rodríguez	Won	
2015	2nd Feroz Awards	Best Screenplay	Alberto Rodríguez & Rafael Cobos	Nominated	
2015	2nd Feroz Awards	Best Main Actor in a Film	Raúl Arévalo	Nominated	
2015	2nd Feroz Awards	Best Main Actor in a Film	Javier Gutiérrez	Won	
2015	2nd Feroz Awards	Best Supporting Actor in a Film	Antonio de la Torre	Nominated	
2015	2nd Feroz Awards	Best Supporting Actress in a Film	Nerea Barros	Nominated	
2015	2nd Feroz Awards	Best Original Soundtrack	Julio de la Rosa	Won	
2015	2nd Feroz Awards	Best Trailer		Won	
2015	2nd Feroz Awards	Best Film Poster		Nominated	
2015	70th CEC Awards	Best Film		Won	
2015	70th CEC Awards	Best Director	Alberto Rodríguez	Won	
2015	70th CEC Awards	Best Original Screenplay	Rafael Cobos, Alberto Rodríguez	Won	
2015	70th CEC Awards	Best Actor	Javier Gutiérrez	Won	
2015	70th CEC Awards	Best Actor	Raúl Arévalo	Nominated	
2015	70th CEC Awards	Best Supporting Actor	Antonio de la Torre	Nominated	
2015	70th CEC Awards	Best New Actress	Nerea Barros	Won	
2015	70th CEC Awards	Best Cinematography	Álex Catalán	Won	
2015	70th CEC Awards	Best Editing	José M. G. Moyano	Won	
2015	70th CEC Awards	Best Music	Julio de la Rosa	Won	
2015	29th Goya Awards	Best Film		Won	
2015	29th Goya Awards	Best Director	Alberto Rodríguez	Won	
2015	29th Goya Awards	Best Original Screenplay	Rafael Cobos and Alberto Rodríguez	Won	
2015	29th Goya Awards	Best Main Actor	Raúl Arévalo	Nominated	
2015	29th Goya Awards	Best Main Actor	Javier Gutiérrez	Won	
2015	29th Goya Awards	Best Supporting Actor	Antonio de la Torre	Nominated	
2015	29th Goya Awards	Best Supporting Actress	Mercedes León	Nominated	
2015	29th Goya Awards	Best New Actress	Nerea Barros	Won	
2015	29th Goya Awards	Best Original Score	Julio de la Rosa	Won	
2015	29th Goya Awards	Best Cinematography	Álex Catalán	Won	
2015	29th Goya Awards	Best Editing	José M. G. Moyano	Won	
2015	29th Goya Awards	Best Production Supervision	Manuela Ocón	Nominated	
2015	29th Goya Awards	Best Art Direction	Pepe Domínguez	Won	
2015	29th Goya Awards	Best Costume Design	Fernando García	Won	
2015	29th Goya Awards	Best Makeup and Hairstyles	Yolanda Piña	Nominated	
2015	29th Goya Awards	Best Sound	Daniel de Zayas, Nacho Royo-Villanova and Pelayo Gutiérrez	Nominated	
2015	29th Goya Awards	Best Special Effects	Pedro Moreno and Juan Ventura	Nominated	
2015	24th Actors and Actresses Union Awards	Best Film Actor in a Leading Role	Javier Gutiérrez	Won	
2015	24th Actors and Actresses Union Awards	Best Film Actor in a Leading Role	Raúl Arévalo	Nominated	
2015	24th Actors and Actresses Union Awards	Best Film Actress in a Minor Role	Mercedes León	Won	
2015	24th Actors and Actresses Union Awards	Best Film Actor in a Minor Role	Manolo Solo	Won	
2015	24th Actors and Actresses Union Awards	Best Film Actor in a Minor Role	Antonio de la Torre	Nominated	
2015	57th Ariel Awards	Best Ibero-American Film		Nominated	
2015	2nd Platino Awards	Best Ibero-American Film		Nominated	
2015	Neox Fan Awards 2015	Best Spanish film		Finalist	
2015	28th European Film Awards	European Film Academy People's Choice Award for Best European Film		Won	

== See also ==
- List of Spanish films of 2014

== Bibliography ==
- El cine de Alberto Rodríguez. Conversaciones, de Manuel Lamarca, Ediciones Carena, Barcelona, 2020, ISBN 978-8417852870.
