= Marseille (2014 film) =

- Theatrical release poster
- Spanish: Marsella
- Directed by: Belén Macías
- Screenplay by: Belén Macías; Aitor Gabilondo; Verónica Fernández
- Produced by: Gerardo Herrero; Marta Esteban
- Starring: María León; Goya Toledo; Noa Fontanals Fourgnaud; Eduard Fernández; Àlex Monner; Óscar Zafra
- Cinematography: Aitor Mantxola
- Edited by: Alejandro Lázaro
- Music by: Juan Pablo Compaired
- Production companies: Tornasol Films; Messidor Films
- Distributed by: Syldavia Cinema
- Release date: 18 July 2014
- Country: Spain
- Language: Spanish

Marseille (Spanish: Marsella) is a 2014 Spanish road movie film directed by Belén Macías which stars María León and Goya Toledo.

== Plot ==
Sara, the biological mother of Claire, has been kept apart from her daughter for a while. Upon Claire's custody returning to Sara, Claire's foster mother Virginia ends up joining Claire and Sara in a trip to Marseille to look for Claire's French biological father.

== Cast ==
- María León as Sara
- Goya Toledo as Virginia
- Noa Fontanals as Claire
- Eduard Fernández as Jesús
- Manuel Morón as Armando
- Àlex Monner
- Óscar Zafra

== Production ==
The screenplay was penned by Belén Macías, Aitor Gabilondo and Verónica Fernández. The film is a Tornasol Films and Messidor Films production, with the participation of TVE and Canal+, and support from ICAA and ICEC and funding from ICO. Shooting locations included Madrid, Castilla–La Mancha, Catalonia and Marseille.

== Release ==
Distributed by Syldavia Cinema, the film was theatrically released in Spain on 18 July 2014.

== Reception ==
Jonathan Holland of The Hollywood Reporter wrote that "well-played and morally intriguing but hobbled by a half-baked script, this road movie stalls long before the end".

Jordi Costa of El País lamented that the "two core characters, with great actresses, end up suffering from the weaknesses of the project".

Mirito Torreiro of Fotogramas rated the film 3 out of 5 stars praising the "immense" casting success of child actress Noa Fontanals, while noting that the writing makes some uncalled for tricks, with the story featuring tears such as an odd criminal subplot.

== Accolades ==
Year	Award	Category	Nominee(s)	Result	Ref.
2015	70th CEC Medals	Best Actress	María León	Nominated	
2015	29th Goya Awards	Best Actress	María León	Nominated	
2015	29th Goya Awards	Best Supporting Actress	Goya Toledo	Nominated	
2015	24th Actors and Actresses Union Awards	Best Film Actress in a Secondary Role	Goya Toledo	Nominated	

== See also ==
- List of Spanish films of 2014
