= Karra Elejalde =

Spanish actor (born 1960)

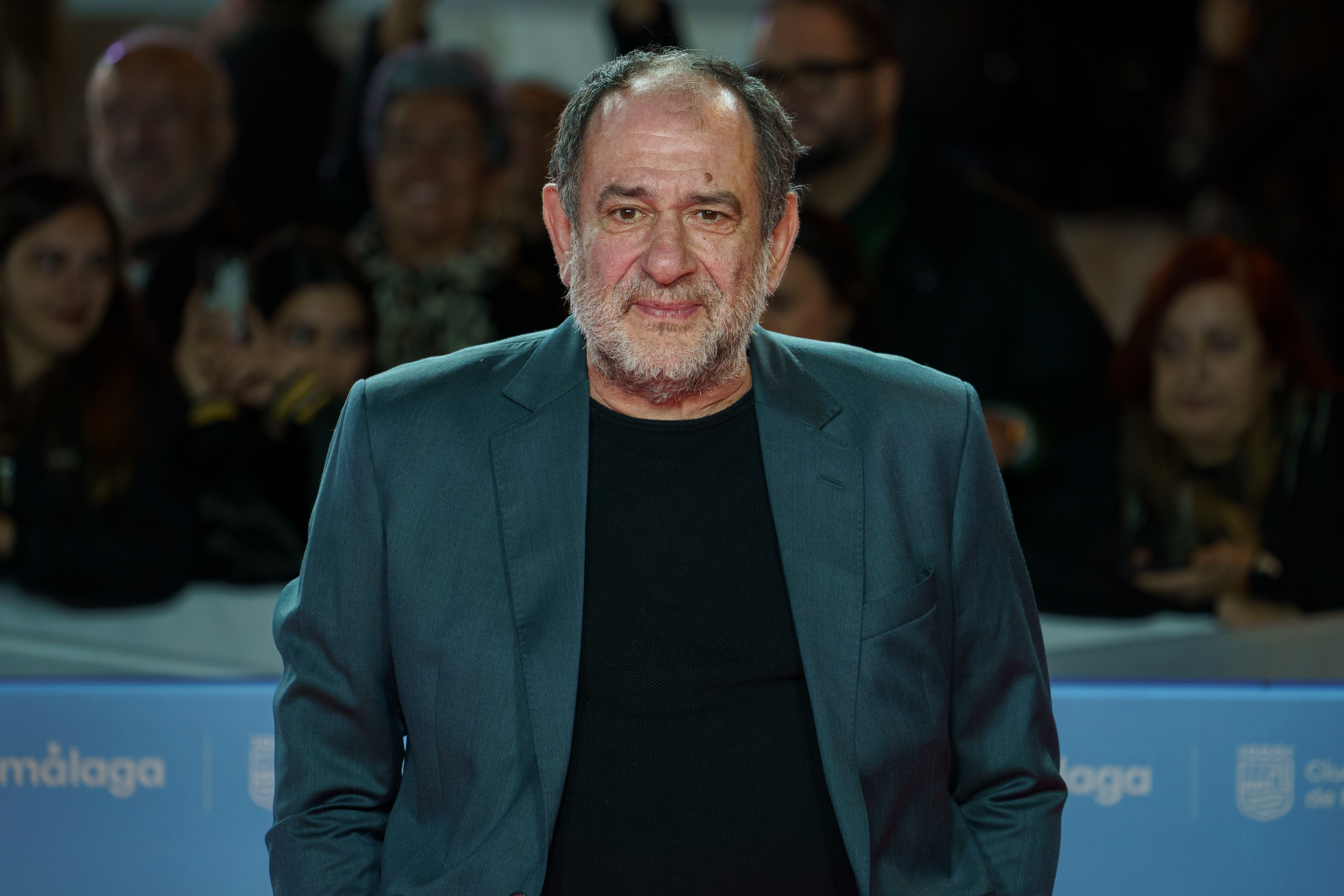
- Elejalde in 2025
- Born: Carlos Elejalde Garay; 10 October 1960 (age 66); Vitoria-Gasteiz, Álava, Spain
- Occupations: Actor; screenwriter; director

Carlos Elejalde Garay (born 10 October 1960) better known as Karra Elejalde, is a Spanish actor and occasional filmmaker.

== Biography ==
Carlos Elejalde Garay was born on 10 October 1960 in Vitoria-Gasteiz. He developed his early acting career on independent stage plays.

After making his feature film debut with a role in the 1987 film A los cuatro vientos, Elejalde's collaborations with Basque cinema auteurs such as Juanma Bajo Ulloa, Álex de la Iglesia or Julio Medem launched his acting career in the 1990s.

He made his feature film directorial debut by shooting the 2000 film Año Mariano in tandem with Fernando Guillén Cuervo, later making his solo debut with the 2004 film Torapia.

In 2014 he replaced Benito Pocino as Mortadelo in Mortadelo y Filemón contra Jimmy el Cachondo (2014). He played Koldo in Ocho apellidos vascos. He reprised the same role in Ocho apellidos catalanes (2015). After the success of both films, he affirmed he won't play the next sequels. In 2016 he appeared in 1898: Los últimos de Filipinas as Brother Carmelo.

During the 25th Goya Awards in 2011 he was awarded by the Goya Award for Best Supporting Actor. In 2015 he was awarded by the same prize at the 29th Goya Awards.

== Selected filmography ==
Year	Title	Role	Notes	Ref.
1990	Sauna	Johnny		
1991	Terranova	Celso		
1992	Vacas (Cows)	Ilegorri / Lucas		
1993	Kika	Policía Mario		
1993	Acción mutante	Manitas		
1993	La ardilla roja (The Red Squirrel)	Antón		
1993	La madre muerta (The Dead Mother)	Ismael López de Matako		
1994	Dias contados (Running Out of Time)	Rafa		
1994	Enciende mi pasión	Bruno		
1995	Salto al vacío (Jump into the Void)	Juancar		
1995	Entre rojas	Padre de Lucía ('Lucía's father')		
1995	Tatiana, la muñeca rusa	Joaquín		
1996	Tierra (Earth)	Patricio		
1996	Corsarios del chip	Roberto Mesa		
1996	Best-seller: El premio	Sergio		
1997	Airbag	Juantxo		
1997	La pistola de mi hermano (My Brother's Gun)	Inspector		
1999	Novios (Couples)	José		
1999	Los sin nombre (The Nameless)	Bruno Massera		
2000	Año Mariano (The Year of Maria)	Mariano	Also writer-director	
2001	Lázaro de Tormes	Arcipreste		
2001	Visionarios (Visionaries)	Padre Laburu ('Father Laburu')		
2002	Carne de gallina (Chicken Skin)	Gelín		
2002	Nos miran (They're Watching Us)	Medina		
2002	A Selva (The Forest)	Velasco		
2007	Los cronocrímenes (Timecrimes)	Héctor		
2010	El idioma imposible (The Impossible Language)	Camarero ('waiter')		
2010	Biutiful	Mendoza		
2010	También la lluvia (Even the Rain)	Antón / Cristóbal Colón		
2012	Invasor (Invader)	Baza		
2012	Miel de naranjas (Orange Honey)	Don Eladio		
2014	Ocho apellidos vascos (Spanish Affair)	Koldo		
2014	A esmorga	Bocas		
2015	Rey Gitano (Gipsy King)	Jose Mari		
2015	Ocho apellidos catalanes (Spanish Affair 2)	Koldo		
2016	Embarazados (We Are Pregnant)	Ginecólogo ('gynaecologist')		
2016	100 metros (100 Meters)	Manolo		
2016	Rumbos (Night Tales)	Pedro		
2016	1898, Los últimos de Filipinas (1898, Our Last Men in the Philippines)	Fray Carmelo		
2017	La higuera de los bastardos (The Bastards' Fig Tree)	Rogelio		
2019	La pequeña Suiza (The Little Switzerland)	Peio		
2019	Mientras dure la guerra (While at War)	Miguel de Unamuno		
2021	Bajocero (Below Zero)	Miguel		
2021	Poliamor para principiantes (Polyamory for Dummies)	Satur		
2022	Llegaron de noche (What Lucia Saw)	Ignacio Ellacuría		
2022	La vida padre (Two Many Chefs)	Juan		
2022	Vasil	Alfredo		
2022	Reyes contra Santa (The Three Wise Kings vs Santa)	Melchor		
2023	Kepler Sexto B (Kepler 6B)	Jonás		
2026	Colisión (Collision Course)	Pedro		
2026	El niño (The Child)	Nicasio		

- 1987: A los cuatro vientos
- 1991: Butterfly Wings as Neighbour
- 1995: Adão e Eva as Rafael
- 1996: El dedo en la llaga as Eduardo
- 1999: A Sweet Scent of Death as El Gitano
- 2001: Killer Housewives as Lalo
- 2002: El rey de la granja
- 2002: The Forest as Velasco
- 2004: Torapia as Basilio
- 2005: El calentito as Pepe
- 2006: Locos por el sexo as Ramón
- 2008: Íntimos y extraños. 3 historias y 1/2 as Diego
- 2014: Mortadelo and Filemon: Mission Implausible as Mortadelo / Tía Fulgencia (voice)
- 2016: Embarazados as Ginecólogo
- 2017: Operación Concha as Marcos Ruiz de Aldazábal
- 2017: Santo Time as Munilla

== Accolades ==
Year	Award	Category	Work	Result	Ref.
2011	66th CEC Medals	Best Supporting Actor	Even the Rain	Won	
2015	20th Forqué Awards	Best Actor	Spanish Affair	Nominated	
2015	2nd Feroz Awards	Best Supporting Actor	Spanish Affair	Nominated	
2015	70th CEC Medals	Best Supporting Actor	Spanish Affair	Won	
2015	24th Actors and Actresses Union Awards	Best Film Actor in a Secondary Role	Spanish Affair	Won	
2017	9th Gaudí Awards	Best Supporting Actor	100 Meters	Won	
2019	6th Feroz Awards	Best Supporting Actor in a TV Series	What the Future Holds	Nominated	
2020	25th Forqué Awards	Best Actor	While at War	Nominated	
2020	12th Gaudí Awards	Best Actor	While at War	Won	
2020	75th CEC Medals	Best Actor	While at War	Nominated	
2020	35th Goya Awards	Best Actor	While at War	Nominated	
2020	29th Actors and Actresses Union Awards	Best Film Actor in a Leading Role	While at War	Won	
2020	7th Platino Awards	Best Actor	While at War	Nominated	
2022	9th Feroz Awards	Best Supporting Actor in a TV Series	La Fortuna	Nominated	
2022	30th Actors and Actresses Union Awards	Best Television Actor in a Secondary Role	La Fortuna	Nominated	
2022	9th Platino Awards	Best Supporting Actor in a Miniseries or TV Series	La Fortuna	Nominated	
2022	67th Valladolid International Film Festival	Best Actor	Vasil	Won	
2023	10th Feroz Awards	Best Actor in a Film	Vasil	Nominated	
2023	6th Berlanga Awards	Best Actor	Kepler 6B	Won	
