= María León (actress) =

Spanish actress

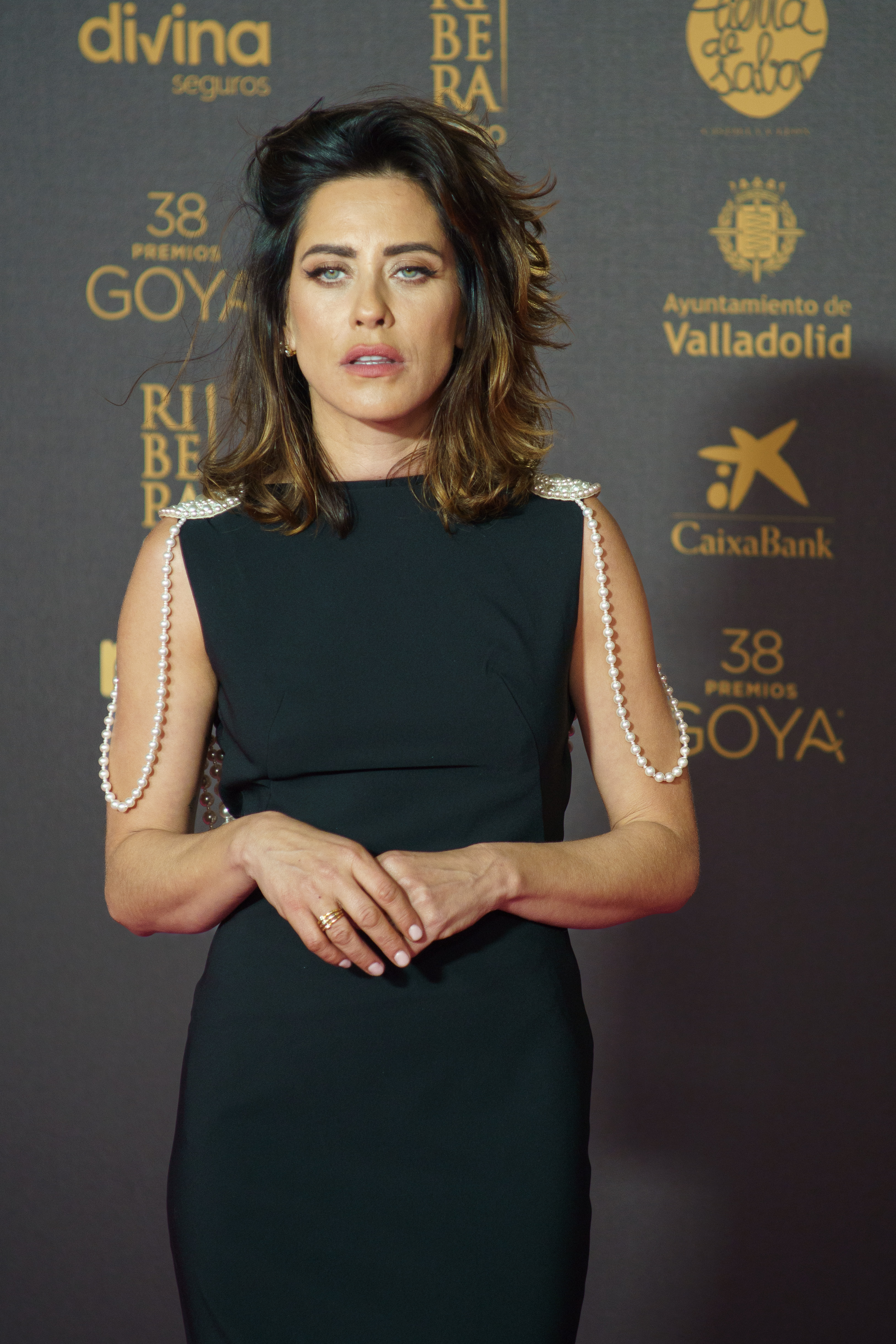
- León in 2024
- Born: María León Barrios; 30 July 1984 (age 41); Seville, Andalusia, Spain
- Years active: 2006–present
- Family: Paco León (brother)

María León Barrios (born 30 July 1984) is a Spanish actress from Seville, Andalusia. She is best known for her performances as Leti in SMS and Carmen in Allí abajo.

== Career ==
León trained at the La Platea school in Madrid and later with Ana Rodríguez Costa in Barcelona. She landed her first starring role in the television series SMS: Sin Miedo a Soñar. Following this, she appeared in various television projects, including Cuenta atrás, Maitena: Estados alterados, and the sketch comedy series La tira, as well as the TV movie Una bala para el rey. Her early film credits include roles in the comedies Fuga de cerebros and Cuerpo de élite. León became best known for her role in the 2011 film The Sleeping Voice, for which she won Silver Shell for Best Actress at the San Sebastián International Film Festival and the Goya Award for Best New Actress. She has played the main role of Carmen in Allí abajo since 2015, which includes appearances from her mother, Carmina Barrios. She has also acted alongside her brother, Paco León, in his show Aída and on The House of Flowers (playing siblings in the latter), and performed as a character based on herself in the Carmina films Paco directed, which star their mother.

León expanded her work in 2019, starring in the final season of Allí abajo, as well as The House of Flowers and the films Escapada and Los Japón. She also filmed La lista, a dramatic comedy about breast cancer, with Victoria Abril, and performed in a version of Lorca's Yerma in the theatre in Granada, Valencia, and Seville.

== Selected filmography ==
Film
Year	Title	Role	Notes	Ref.
2009	Fuga de cerebros (Brain Drain)		Feature film debut	
2011	La voz dormida (The Sleeping Voice)	Pepita	Goya Award for Best New Actress	
2012	Carmina o revienta (Carmina or Blow Up)	María		
2014	Carmina y amén (Carmina and Amen)	María		
2014	Marsella (Marseille)	Sara		
2015	Rey gitano (Gipsy King)	Dolores		
2015	Los miércoles no existen (Wednesdays Don't Exist)	Patricia		
2016	Cuerpo de élite (Heroes Wanted)	Lola		
2017	El autor (The Motive)	Amanda		
2018	Sin fin (Not the End)	María		
2018	Escapada	Lucía		
2019	Los Japón (The Japon)	Encarni		
2020	La lista de los deseos (Wishlist)	Eva		
2021	Donde caben dos (More the Merrier)	Alba		
2022	El universo de Óliver (Oliver's Universe)	Carmela		
2022	La piedad (Piety)			
2022	Historias para no contar (Stories Not to Be Told)	Ana		
2023	Cerrar los ojos (Close Your Eyes)	Belén Granados		

TV
Year	Title	Channel	Role	Episodes
2006–2007	SMS: Sin Miedo a Soñar	laSexta	Leti	99
2007	Cuenta atrás	Cuatro	Tati	1
2007	Hospital Central	Telecinco	Mabel	1
2008	Estados alterados	laSexta	María	1
2009	Una bala para el Rey	Antena 3	Ada	2
2010	La tira	laSexta	Chari	82
2010-2011	Aída	Telecinco	"La Jose"	3
2011	Los Quién	Antena 3	Arancha	1
2012-2014	Con el culo al aire	Antena 3	Sandra Rojo	42
2015-2019	Allí abajo	Antena 3	Carmen Almonte	69
2019-2020	The House of Flowers	Netflix	Purificación Riquelme	10
2021	Blowing Kisses	Star	Nines	2
2022	Drag Race España	ATRESplayer Premium	Herself - Guest judge	1
2022	Heridas	ATRESplayer Premium	Yolanda Romero	13
2024	El caso Asunta (The Asunta Case)		Cristina Cruces	

== Accolades ==
Year	Award	Category	Work	Result	Ref.
2011	59th San Sebastián International Film Festival	Silver Shell for Best Actress	The Sleeping Voice	Won	
2012	67th CEC Medals	Best New Actor or Actress	The Sleeping Voice	Won	
2012	26th Goya Awards	Best New Actress	The Sleeping Voice	Won	
2012	21st Actors and Actresses Union Awards	Best Film Actress in a Leading Role	The Sleeping Voice	Won	
2013	68th CEC Medals	Best Supporting Actress	Carmina or Blow Up	Nominated	
2013	27th Goya Awards	Best Supporting Actress	Carmina or Blow Up	Nominated	
2013	Neox Fan Awards	Best Actress	Con el culo al aire	Won	
2015	2nd Feroz Awards	Best Supporting Actress	Carmina and Amen	Nominated	
2015	70th CEC Medals	Best Actress	Marseille	Nominated	
2015	70th CEC Medals	Best Supporting Actress	Carmina and Amen	Nominated	
2015	29th Goya Awards	Best Actress	Marseille	Nominated	
2020	29th Actors and Actresses Union Awards	Best Actress in an International Production	The House of Flowers	Nominated	
2023	2nd Carmen Awards	Best Supporting Actress	Oliver's Universe	Nominated	
2024	3rd Carmen Awards	Best Supporting Actress	Close Your Eyes	Nominated	
2025	12th Feroz Awards	Best Supporting Actress in a Series	The Asunta Case	Nominated	
