= Mercedes León =

Spanish actress and theatre director (born 1958)

Mercedes León García (born 27 May 1958) is a Spanish actress and theatre director. She graduated from Malaga Theatre Institute. She is best known for her role in the film La isla mínima for which she was nominated for Goya Award for Best Supporting Actress. She also appeared in the telenovela El secreto de Puente Viejo which aired on Antena 3.

== Filmography ==
Television

Year	Title	Role	Channel	Episodes
2014–2015	El secreto de Puente Viejo	Bernarda Jiménez Aldecoa	Antena 3	164 episodes
2016	Víctor Ros	Doña Rosario	La 1	6 episodes
2016	La que se avecina	Joaquina	Telecinco	1 episodes
2017	Sé quien eres	Reyes	Telecinco	3 episodes
2017	Perdóname, Señor	Sor Elisa	Telecinco	6 episodes
2020	Veneno	María Jesús Rodríguez	Atresplayer Premium	4 episodes
2021	Los herederos de la tierra		Netflix	¿? episodes

== Theatre productions ==
- A sangre
- Cinco cubiertos
- El perfil izquierdo de Ricardo
- El regalo
- El sabor de la yuca
- La noche no duerme
- Toque de queda
- Tres deseos

== Awards and nominations ==
- Nominated for Goya Award for Best Supporting Actress for La isla mínima
