= 321 Days in Michigan =

- Original title: 321 días en Míchigan
- Directed by: Enrique García
- Screenplay by: Enrique García; Isa Sánchez
- Produced by: Ana Figueroa
- Starring: Chico García; Virginia DeMorata; Héctor Medina; Virginia Muñoz; Salva Reina
- Cinematography: Alberto D.Centeno
- Edited by: Miguel Doblado
- Music by: Fernando Velázquez
- Production companies: Lanube Películas; Encanta Films
- Distributed by: Cada Films
- Release dates: 26 March 2014 (Málaga); 31 October 2014 (Spain)
- Running time: 98 minutes
- Country: Spain
- Language: Spanish

321 Days in Michigan (Spanish: 321 días en Míchigan) is a 2014 Spanish tragicomedy prison film directed by Enrique García, winner of best director in a debut film at the Premios Asecan del Cine Andaluz. It won the Audience Award at the 17th Málaga Film Festival.

== Synopsis ==
Filmed at the former provincial jail of Málaga, it is the story of Antonio Chico García, a young and successful executive, condemned to go to prison because of white collar crimes. In order to hide this fact, he pretends he is spending time at the University of Michigan working on a master's degree. His girlfriend Lola agrees to help him by uploading pictures to a blog about his fictional life there. The film deals with his life in prison and his relationships with fellow inmates.

== Cast ==
- Virginia DeMorata as Sara
- Chico García as Antonio
- Hector Medina as Carmona
- Virginia Muñoz as Lamis
- David García-Intriago as Mario
- Salva Reina as Juani
- Maggie Civantos as Lola
- Jesús Carrillo as Don Alberto
- Anibal Soto as Don Gregorio
- José Manuel Poga as El Rubio
- Juanma Lara as Ochoa
- Joaquín Núñez as Don Miguel
- Cuca Escribano as Doña Amalia
- Rafa Castillo-Romero as Tana
- Concha Galán as Madre de Sara
- Carmen Baquero as Doña Irene
- Cristina Rojas as Doña Sandra
- Olalla Hernández
- Miguel Guardiola

== Production ==
The films is a Lanube Películas and Encanta Films production. It was shot in Málaga featuring a cast primarily consisting of actors from Málaga.

== Release ==
The film premiered at the 17th Málaga Film Festival in March 2014. Distributed by Cada Films, it opened in Spanish theatres on 31 October 2014, the same day as its scheduled television premiere on Canal Plus.

== Critical reception ==
Despite the omnipresence of Antonio throughout the film, some critics consider that this is really the story of Sara, (Virginia De Morata). The Videodromo film critic Aitziber Saldias states "...this is Sara's film, Sara's story. She catches all the attention by just moving in the background..." De Morata won best supporting actress (Premios Asecan).

In his review for El Mundo, Cristóbal C. Monilla notes that prison is seen as a place where people are more "burdened by their internal condemnation dictated by life itself than by the physical confinement behind bars."

The Fotogramas critic, Mirito Torreiro, considers that "its authenticy, dynamism, the humanity that comes from its actors." constitutes the film best qualities. "So much so as to [make us] forgive its faults..."

== Awards ==
- XVII Festival del Cine Español de Málaga - Two awards: 321 days in Michigan: special award by the jury. Best supporting actor: Héctor Meres (321 días en Michigan).
- 2015 Premios Asecan del Cine Andaluz - Two awards: Best actress: Virginia de Morata (321 días en Michigan). Best debuting director: Enrique García (321 días en Michigan).

== See also ==
- List of Spanish films of 2014
