= Elena Anaya =

Spanish actress

- Anaya in 2026
- Born: Elena Anaya Gutiérrez; 17 July 1975 (age 51); Palencia, Spain
- Occupation: Actress
- Years active: 1995–present
- Partner: Tina Afugu Cordero
- Children: 1

Elena Anaya Gutiérrez (born 17 July 1975) is a Spanish actress. She garnered public recognition in Spain for her performance in Sex and Lucia (2001), which also earned her a nomination to the Goya Award for Best Supporting Actress. She starred in The Skin I Live In (2011), for which she won the Goya Award for Best Actress. She is also known for her roles as one of Dracula's brides in Van Helsing (2004), the Spanish tourist in Room in Rome (2010) and Doctor Poison in Wonder Woman (2017).

== Early life ==
Anaya was born in Palencia, Spain. She is the youngest of three children. Her mother, Elena (Nena), is a housewife who later owned a boarding house in Palencia. Her father, Juan José Anaya Gómez (1934–2011), was an industrial engineer.

== Career ==
Anaya moved to Cádiz to train as an actress, after which she landed roles in África (her film debut) and Familia.

She first received international attention in 2001 for her role in the sexually explicit drama Sex and Lucia. She also had a small part the year after in Almodóvar's Talk to Her.

Her best-known Hollywood film role was as Aleera, one of Dracula's brides in 2004's Van Helsing. That same year, Anaya was named as one of European films' Shooting Stars by European Film Promotion.

In 2006, Anaya appeared in Justin Timberlake's music video for his single, "SexyBack".

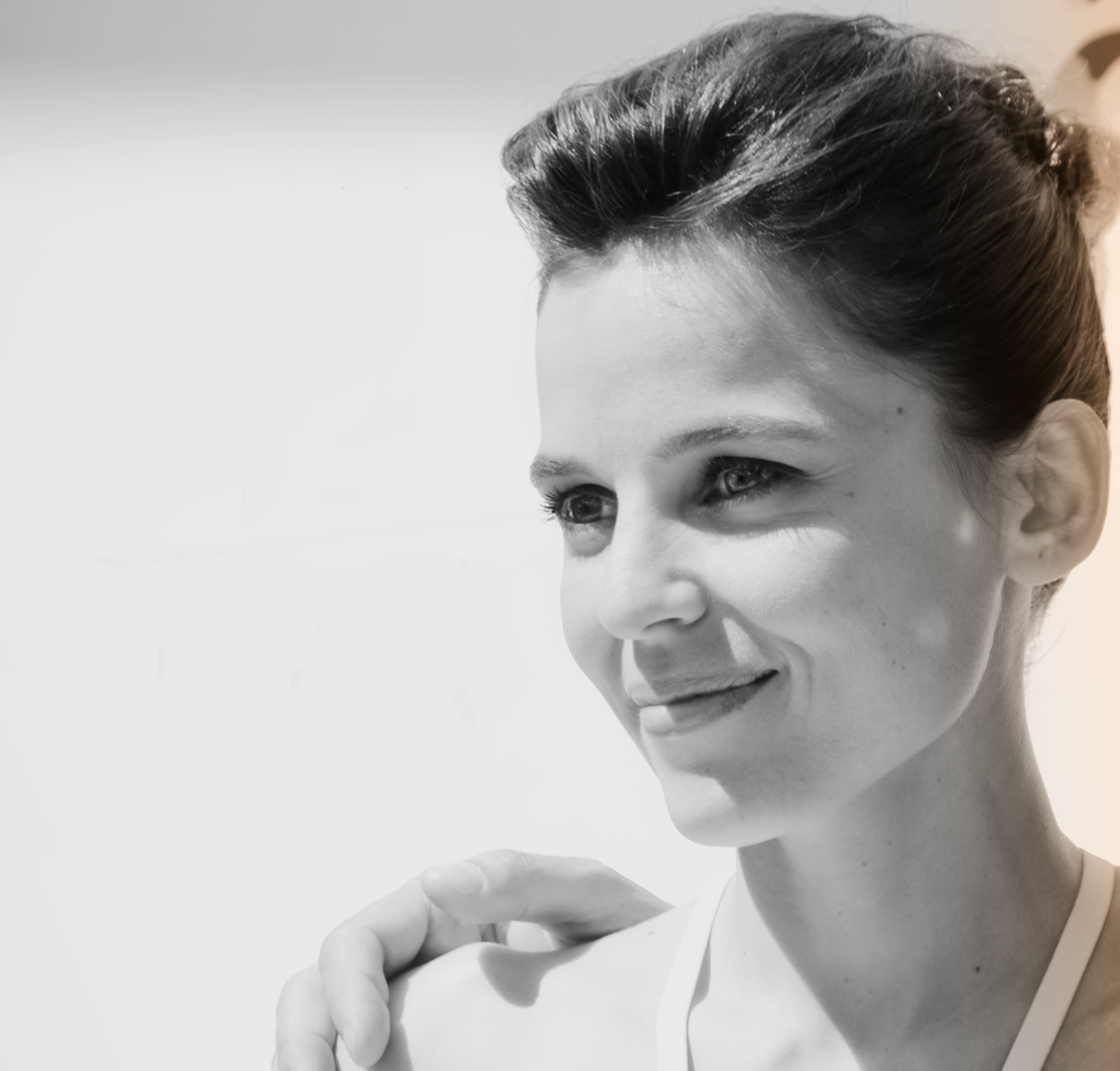
Anaya at the 2010 Malaga Film Festival

She played supporting roles in international films such as Savage Grace (2007) and Cairo Time (2009), and then starring roles in 2010's Room in Rome and Almodóvar's 2011 The Skin I Live In.

In 2017, Anaya appeared as Doctor Poison in the superhero blockbuster film, Wonder Woman.

== Personal life ==
Anaya is a lesbian. Anaya and director Beatriz Sanchís were reportedly in a relationship from 2008 to 2013.

In November 2016, it was announced that Anaya was expecting her first child with her partner, Tina Afugu Cordero, a costume designer. In February 2017, Anaya gave birth to their son.

== Filmography ==
=== Film ===
Year	Title	Role	Notes	Ref.
1996	África	África		
1997	Familia	Luna		
1998	Grandes ocasiones	Susy		
1998	Lágrimas negras (Black Tears)	Alicia		
1998	Finisterre, donde termina el mundo	Laura		
1999	Las huellas borradas (Fading Memories)	Rosa		
2000	El árbol del penitente	Sonsoles		
2000	El invierno de las anjanas (The Winter of the Fairies)	Adelaida		
2001	Lucía y el sexo (Sex and Lucia)	Belén		
2001	Sin noticias de Dios (Don't Tempt Me)	Pili		
2002	La habitación azul (The Blue Room)	Ana		
2002	Hable con ella (Talk to Her)	Ángela		
2002	Rencor (Rencor)	Esther		
2003	Dos tipos duros (Two Tough Guys)	Tatiana		
2004	Van Helsing	Aleera second bride		
2004	Ana y Manuel	Ana		
2005	Fragile	Helen Perez		
2005	Dead Fish	Mimi		
2006	Alatriste	Angélica de Alquézar		
2006	Stage Kiss	Natalia		
2007	Savage Grace	Blanca		
2007	Miguel & William	Leonor		
2007	In the Land of Women	Sofia Buñuel		
2008	Sólo quiero caminar	Ana		
2008	Mesrine: L'Instinct De Mort	Sofia		
2009	Hierro	María		
2009	Cairo Time	Kathryn		
2010	Habitación en Roma (Room in Rome)	Alba		
2010	Point Blank	Nadia Pierret		
2011	La piel que habito (The Skin I Live In)	Vera Cruz		
2012	Hijos de las nubes, la última colonia (Sons of the Clouds: The Last Colony)	Narrator		
2013	Pensé que iba a haber fiesta	Ana		
2014	Todos están muertos (They Are All Dead)	Lupe		
2015	Lejos del mar (Far from the Sea)	Marina		
2015	La memoria del agua (The Memory of Water)	Amanda		
2015	Swung	Alice		
2016	The Infiltrator	Gloria Alcaino		
2016	Zipi y Zape y la isla del capitán (Zip & Zap and the Captain's Island)	Miss Pam		
2017	La cordillera (The Summit)	Claudia Klein		
2017	Wonder Woman	Isabel Maru / Doctor Poison		
2020	Rifkin's Festival	Jo Rojas		
2022	Jaula (The Chalk Line)	Paula		
2023	Fatum	Comisaria Costa		
2026	Rosebush Pruning	Emma		
2026	Hermanas (Sisters)	Marta		

=== Television ===
Year	Title	Role	Notes	Ref.
2020	Professionals	Graciela Davila	series regular; 10 episodes	
2024	Las largas sombras (Past Lies)	Rita		
2025	Innato (Innate)	Sara		

== Awards and nominations ==
Year	Award	Category	Work	Result	Ref.
2002	16th Goya Awards	Best Supporting Actress	Sex and Lucia	Nominated	
2002	11th Actors Union Awards	Best Film Performance in a Secondary Role	Sex and Lucia	Won	
2009	Sitges Film Festival	Best Actress	Hierro	Won	
2011	25th Goya Awards	Best Actress	Room in Rome	Nominated	
2011	20th Actors and Actresses Union Awards	Best Film Actress in a Leading Role	Room in Rome	Nominated	
2012	26th Goya Awards	Best Actress	The Skin I Live In	Won	
2012	21st Actors and Actresses Union Awards	Best Film Actress in a Leading Role	The Skin I Live In	Nominated	
2014	17th Málaga Film Festival	Silver Biznaga for Best Actress	They Are All Dead	Won	
2015	2nd Feroz Awards	Best Main Actress in a Film	They Are All Dead	Nominated	
2015	70th CEC Medals	Best Actress	They Are All Dead	Nominated	
2015	29th Goya Awards	Best Actress	They Are All Dead	Nominated	
2015	24th Actors and Actresses Union Awards	Best Film Actress in a Leading Role	They Are All Dead	Won	
2016	3rd Platino Awards	Best Actress	The Memory of Water	Nominated	
2025	26th Iris Awards	Best Actress	Past Lies	Nominated	
