= Yolanda Ramos =

Spanish actress

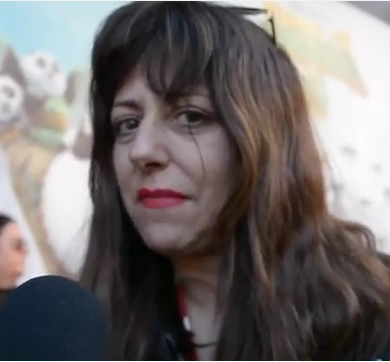
- Born: 4 September 1968 (age 57); Cerdanyola del Vallès, Spain
- Occupations: Actress; stand-up comedian
- Spouse: Mario Matute
- Children: 1

Yolanda Ramos (born 4 September 1968) is a Spanish actress and comedian from Catalonia. She has featured in supporting performances in films such as Carmina and Amen and television series such as Paquita Salas and Cardo.

== Biography ==
Yolanda Ramos was born in Cerdanyola del Vallès, province of Barcelona. She worked in her early career as vedette in Poble Sec.

She has taken part in several shows of the theatre groups El Terrat and La Cubana. In the last years, she has become very popular thanks to her impersonations in Homo Zapping. She featured in a minor role in Pedro Almodóvar's Volver (2006), playing the role of a jerky journalist in a television set.

She is married to Mario Matute and they have one child, Charlotte, born in 2013.

In September 2020, while filming Honeymoon with My Mother in Mauritius, during COVID-19 pandemic, she tested positive for COVID-19.

== TV ==
- MasterChef Celebrity 4 - Contestant: 5th classified (2019)
- Benvinguts a la família (2018)
- Villaviciosa de al lado (2016)
- Tu cara me suena - Contestant: 9th classified (2016)
- El intermedio (2006-2008)
- 7 Vidas (2006)
- Buenafuente (2005)
- Homo Zapping (2003–2005)
- Los más (2005)
- Vitamina N (2002–2004)
- Me lo dijo Pérez (1999)

== Accolades ==
Year	Award	Category	Work	Result	Ref.
2015	2nd Feroz Awards	Best Supporting Actress (film)	Carmina and Amen	Nominated	
2015	29th Goya Awards	Best New Actress	Carmina and Amen	Nominated	
2019	28th Actors and Actresses Union Awards	Best Television Actress in a Minor Role	Paquita Salas	Nominated	
2020	7th Feroz Awards	Best Supporting Actress (TV)	Paquita Salas	Won	
2022	9th Feroz Awards	Best Supporting Actress (TV)	Cardo	Nominated	
