= Jan Cornet =

Spanish actor

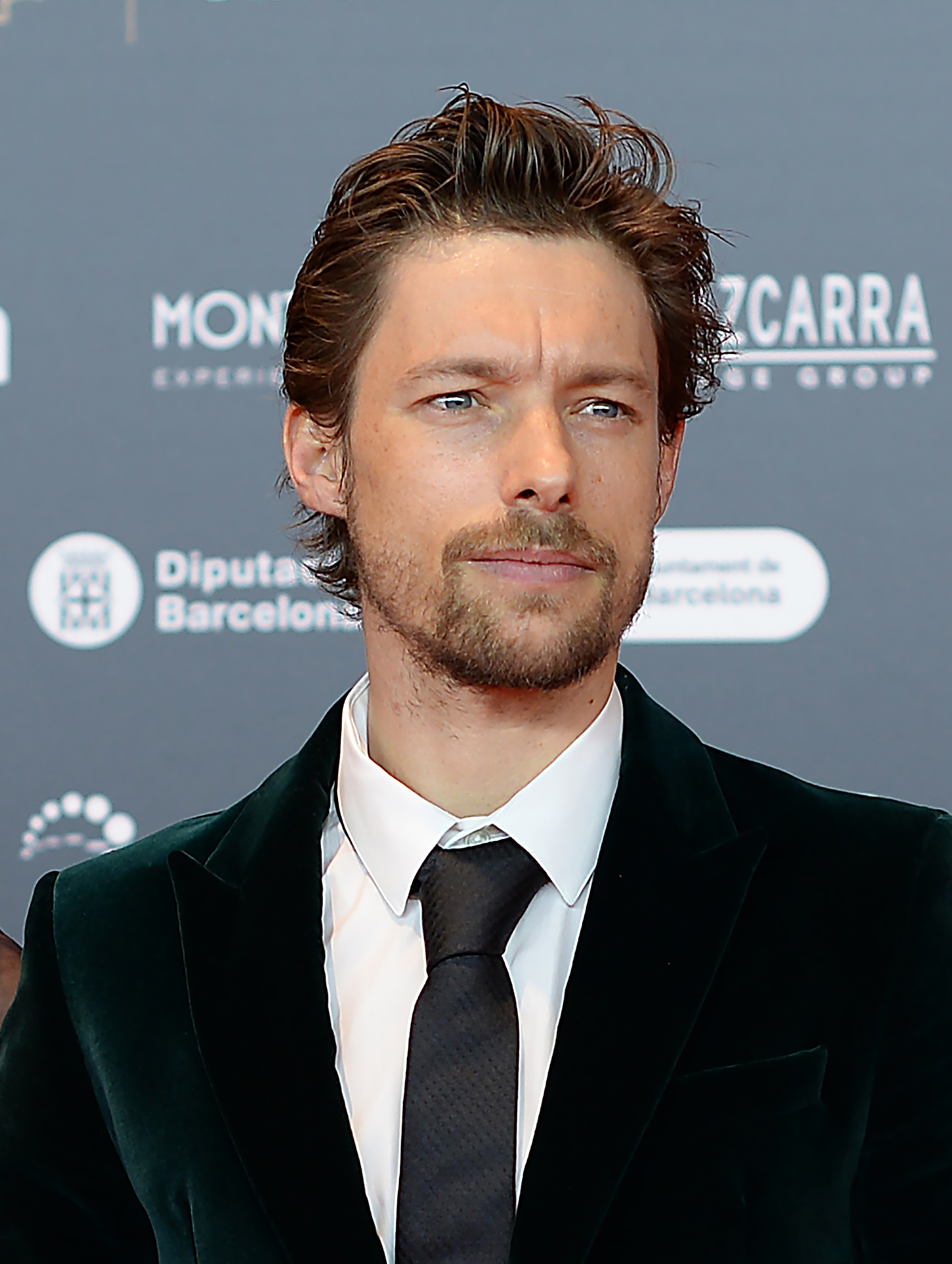
- Cornet at the 12th Gaudí Awards in 2020
- Born: Jan Cornet Galí; 24 February 1982 (age 43); Terrassa, Catalonia, Spain
- Occupation: Actor

Jan Cornet Galí (born 24 February 1982) is a Spanish actor.

== Biography ==
Jan Cornet Galí was born in Terrassa on 24 February 1982. He landed his feature film debut in The Night of the Brother (2005).

Cornet's performance in The Skin I Live In (2011) won him the Goya Award for Best New Actor.
