= Beautiful Youth =

2014 film

- Spanish: Hermosa juventud
- Directed by: Jaime Rosales
- Written by: Enric Rufas; Jaime Rosales
- Starring: Ingrid García Jonsson
- Cinematography: Pau Esteve Birba
- Edited by: Lucía Casal
- Release dates: 18 May 2014 (Cannes); 30 May 2014 (Spain)
- Running time: 100 minutes
- Countries: Spain; France
- Language: Spanish

Beautiful Youth (Spanish: Hermosa juventud) is a 2014 Spanish-French drama film directed by Jaime Rosales. It was selected to compete in the Un Certain Regard section at the 2014 Cannes Film Festival where it won a commendation from the Ecumenical Jury.

== Plot ==
A young Spanish couple lives in Madrid with their mothers, in dilapidated apartments and within days of chatter and boredom. In the absence of money and prospects, when they discover her pregnancy, they decide to shoot an amateur porn film.

== Cast ==
- Ingrid García-Jonsson as Natalia
- Carlos Rodríguez as Carlos
- Inma Nieto as Dolores
- Fernando Barona
- Patricia Mendy
- Juanma Calderón
- Miguel Guardiola

== Accolades ==
Awards	Category	Nominated	Result
2014 Cannes Film Festival	Ecumenical Jury Commendation		Nominated
2nd Feroz Awards	Best Drama Film		Nominated
2nd Feroz Awards	Best Screenplay	Jaime Rosales and Enric Rufas	Nominated
2nd Feroz Awards	Best Main Actress	Ingrid García Jonsson	Nominated
29th Goya Awards	Best New Actress	Ingrid García Jonsson	Nominated

== See also ==
- List of Spanish films of 2014
- List of French films of 2014
