= Paco de Lucía: La búsqueda =

- Film poster
- Directed by: Francisco Sánchez Varela
- Screenplay by: Casilda Sánchez; Francisco Sánchez Varela
- Produced by: Anxo Rodríguez; Lucía Sánchez Varela; Francisco Sánchez Varela; Casilda Varela
- Starring: Paco de Lucía; Camarón de la Isla; Rubén Blades
- Cinematography: Carlos García de Dios; Alejandro García Flores
- Edited by: José M. G. Moyano; Darío García; Nacho R. Piedra
- Production companies: AC/E Acción Cultural Española; Canal+ España; Fundación SGAE; Instituto de la Cinematografía y de las Artes Audiovisuales; Mediaset España; Telecinco Cinema; Ziggurat Films
- Distributed by: Bodega Films; Cine Global; Respect
- Release date: 20 September 2014 (Spain)
- Running time: 95 minutes
- Country: Spain
- Language: Spanish

Paco de Lucía: La búsqueda is a Spanish documentary about the guitarist Paco de Lucía. It is directed by Francisco Sánchez Varela and portrayed by Paco de Lucía, who died before the production, Camarón de la Isla and Rubén Blades.

In 2015, it received a Goya Award for Best Documentary, and it was nominated for Platino Awards for Best Documentary. It got a Gold Record. It shows 29 themes music of the artist.

== Cast ==
- Paco de Lucía
- Pepe de Lucía
- Alberto Gavira
- Ricardo Modrego
- Piraña
- Antonio Serrano
- Alain Pérez
- Duquende
- David de Jacoba
- Farru
- Alejandro Sanz
- Poti Trujillo
- Carles Benavent
- Rubén Blades
- Mario Escudero
- John McLaughlin
- Jorge Pardo
- Carlos Santana
- Antonio Sánchez Palomo
- Chick Corea
- Estrella Morente
- Juan José Téllez
- María José Cantudo
- Ángela Carrasco
- Camarón de la Isla
