= Mortadelo and Filemon: Mission Implausible =

Mortadelo & Filemon: Mission Implausible
- Theatrical release poster
- Mortadelo y Filemón contra Jimmy el Cachondo
- Directed by: Javier Fesser
- Written by: Javier Fesser; Claro García; Cristóbal Ruiz
- Based on: Characters by Francisco Ibáñez
- Produced by: Antonio Asensio; Luis Manso; Federico Ramos
- Starring: Karra Elejalde; Janfri Topera; Ángel Chame; Mariano Venancio; Víctor Monigote; Emilio Gavira
- Cinematography: Miguel Pablos
- Edited by: Javier Fesser
- Music by: Rafael Arnau
- Production companies: Ilion Animation Studios; Zeta Cinema; Películas Pendelton; Televisión Española (participation); Canal+ (participation); Televisió de Catalunya (participation); ONO (participation)
- Distributed by: Warner Bros. Pictures (Spain); Film Factory Entertainment (United States)
- Release date: 28 November 2014 (Spain)
- Running time: 88 minutes
- Country: Spain
- Language: Spanish
- Budget: $12.5 million
- Box office: €4.9 million ($5.5 million)

Mortadelo & Filemon: Mission Implausible (Spanish: Mortadelo y Filemón contra Jimmy el Cachondo, "Mortadelo and Filemon versus Jimmy the Freak") is a 2014 Spanish animated Slapstick action comedy film co-written, directed and edited by Javier Fesser based on the characters from the Mort & Phil comic book series. It achieved six nominations for the 29th Goya Awards, winning in the Best Adapted Screenplay and Best Animated Film categories, and two for the second edition of Premios Feroz.

== Plot ==
After installing his 301st vault, Superintendent Vincent, the head of the spy agency known as the T.I.A. (a parody of CIA), gets a message from Jimmy the Freak (Jimmy el Cachondo), the agency’s arch-nemesis. Once Jimmy successfully steals the vault, the Super calls in the unlucky Phil (Filemón) and his sidekick Mort (Mortadelo)—right after Phil dreams of being respected and admired by everyone—only to find out that a thug he once jailed, Mulecruncher (Tronchamulas), has escaped and is burning with rage, ready to use the dreaded “Ding-Dong” (El Aquello) technique, which turns the victim inside out.

At the agency, an enraged Mulecruncher is calmed by Professor Bacterium’s invention, Reversulin, which transforms his angry and intimidating demeanor into that of a kind and polite man. The Super instructs Phil and Mort to take Mulecruncher into a witness protection program, but after a wild chase across town involving a runaway baby stroller, the trio ends up at a reality show called Gran Fulano (a parody of Big Brother), where the transformed Mulecruncher accidentally reveals the Super’s entire plan to 200 million viewers.

Jimmy, furious after his cousin claims to know his hiding spot, smashes the roof of the T.I.A. building. This leads the Super to send Mort and Phil to take Mulecruncher back to their apartment. With Mulecruncher still dazed from the Reversulin, they put him to work doing chores like darning, ironing, washing, and cooking. Phil teases him about his father not wanting him, prompting Mulecruncher to threaten that, even under the effects of Reversulin, he can still pull off the “Ding-Dong” on him. Meanwhile, Jimmy and his goons try—and fail—to demolish the building his cousin is in. Downstairs, Mulecruncher encounters an almost-blind old man who mistakes him for a child and tries to take him to the police. But once the Reversulin wears off, Mulecruncher takes control and heads to Jimmy’s hideout to warn him he’s wanted.

Convinced Jimmy had kidnapped Mulecruncher, Phil and Mort set off to rescue him. They soon found out the pair had trashed his hideout. Using a crane, Mulecruncher grabs them in a homemade plane inspired by Phil’s dream and sends them flying toward Jimmy, who’s on his way to the T.I.A. with a missile. A wild aerial battle breaks out to prevent the building’s destruction, but in a moment of distraction, Phil accidentally drops the missile, hitting the T.I.A. and blasting it, along with the Super and Professor Bacterium, into space.

Mulecruncher shows up again in a dog catcher car, chasing Jimmy’s helicopter in search of the little old man. When Phil mocks him about leaving his shoes behind, Mulecruncher growls and huffs before pulling off the “Ding-Dong” technique. After saving the little old man from a nasty fall, Mulecruncher assumes he wants to turn his life around, and the two head off into the sunset. Jimmy, frustrated that his plan has failed, presses a button that transforms his helicopter, intending to blow them both up. Still being mocked by the duo, he threatens to throw a bomb at them. They stall by making small talk, but it doesn’t work, and Jimmy presses the button. Just before the bomb reaches them, the T.I.A building collapses on Jimmy, crushing him instantly.

After retrieving the envelope for the hospitalized Super, Phil and Mort were shocked to discover it held nothing more than a simple sweet potato puree recipe. Later, after forcing the Super to swallow his vault, he began chasing them across Antarctica armed with a fishing spear, while they remained in disguise, hoping the situation would “cool off.”

In a post-opening-credits scene, Phil uses the last dose of Reversulin to make Irma from the T.I.A. fall in love with him, though both are offscreen and have been beaten up by the goalkeeper.

== Characters ==
The portrayal of the characters is rather faithful to the comics except for Mortadelo and Filemon: Mortadelo has far more common sense and Filemon is actually quite dumb while in the comics, it was the opposite.

=== The T.I.A. Staff ===
Mortadelo: The Subordinate of Filemon and the Super. Despite being a bit clumsy, he's rather cunning, resourceful and has invented several gadgets on his own to protect his apartment. He has incredible skill in disguising himself as virtually anything ranging from animals to professionals outfits, machinery etc...Like everyone else, he cares very little about his boss and has often proved that he might be actually more competent than Filemon.

Filemón: The Boss of Mortadelo. Initially presentend as the "Straight-Man" to Mortadelo's "Ditz" in the comics, his portrayal into this film is different: extremely stupid, arrogant, cowardly, bossy and incompetent. The only trait of Filemón's personality from the comics that remains in the film is that he's incredibly accident-prone, capable of being injured in comical and painful ways.

He spent most of his time dreaming that he's a great hero but is despised by everyone and tries to avoid vengeful foes who he has arrested in the past.

== Voice cast in Spanish ==
Actor	Character
Karra Elejalde	Mortadelo
Janfri Topera	Filemón
Ramón Langa	Filemón (in a dream)
Mariano Venancio	The Superintendent
Enrique Villén	Professor Bacterio
Berta Ojea	Ofelia
Athenea Mata	Irma
Emilio Gavira	Rompetechos
Ángel Chame	Jimmy el Cachondo (Jimmy the Freak in English)
José Alias	Tronchamulas (Mulecruncher in English)
Víctor Monigote	Tronchamulas (reverted)
Chani Martín	Mari (Billy in English)
Manuel Tallafé	Trini (Bob in English)
Karlos Arguiñano	Himself (on TV)

== Box office ==
The film's production budget is estimated at $12.5 million. In Spain, the film grossed €4.9 million ($5.5 million).

== Awards and nominations ==
Awards	Category	Nominated	Result
29th Goya Awards	Best Adapted Screenplay	Javier Fesser, Claro García and Cristóbal Ruiz	Won
29th Goya Awards	Best Animated Film		Won
29th Goya Awards	Best Art Direction	Víctor Monigote	Nominated
29th Goya Awards	Best Production Supervision	Luis Fernández Lago and Julián Larrauri	Nominated
29th Goya Awards	Best Sound	Nicolás de Poulpiquet and Javier Muñoz	Nominated
29th Goya Awards	Best Original Song	"Morta y File" by Rafael Arnau	Nominated
II Premios Feroz	Best Comedy		Nominated
II Premios Feroz	Best Original Soundtrack	Rafael Arnau	Nominated
