= Jesús Castro (actor) =

Spanish actor

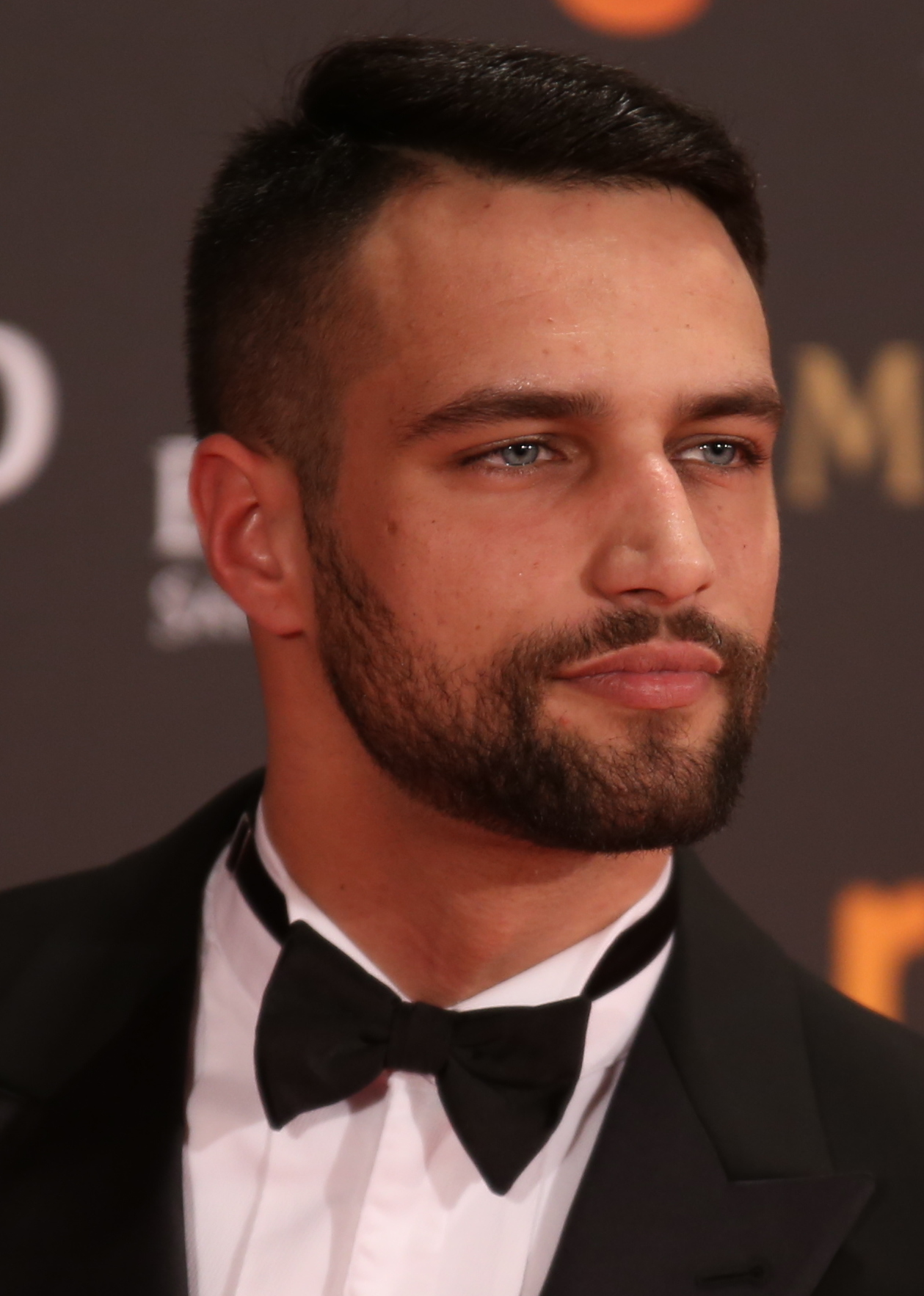
- Jesús Castro at the 31st Goya Awards
- Born: Jesús Castro Romero; 19 January 1993 (age 33); Puerto Real, Andalusia, Spain
- Occupation: Actor

Jesús Castro Romero (born 19 January 1993) is a Spanish actor known for starring in El Niño. He is considered to be one of the new sex symbols of the Spanish cinema.

== Biography ==
Jesús Castro was born on 19 January 1993 at the Hospital Universitario in Puerto Real. Before being an actor, he worked in a discotheque and in his father's café in Vejer de la Frontera preparing churros.

He was cast in his role in El Niño from among three thousand young men who auditioned. After appearing in El Niño, someone suggested that he audition for a spot on the cast of La isla mínima, by Alberto Rodriguez Librero where he played Quini.

In 2015, Jesús was cast in the TV Series Mar de plastico, as Lucas Morales, playing in 13 episodes. Then in 2017 Jesús starred in the TV series shot by Mediaset Secretos de Estado with Michelle Calvó and Myriam Gallego, released in 2018.

In 2018 it was announced by Diagonal TV that Jesús Castro and Aitor Luna were the first to be cast in the TV series La Reina del Sur. In addition, Brigada Costa del Sol, which is about drugs and is filming in Málaga, stars among Hugo Silva, and Álvaro Cervantes.

== Filmography ==
Television roles and films performances
Year	Title	Roles	Notes
2014	El Niño	Niño	Film
2014	La isla mínima	Quini	Film
2015	Mar de plástico	Lucas Morales	TV series; 13 episodes
2015–2016	El Príncipe	Paco Ben Barek	TV series; 10 episodes
2017	Perdóname, Señor	Rafa	TV series; 8 episodes
2019	La Reina del Sur	Jesús	TV series; 2 episodes
2019	Secretos de Estado	Andrés Rivera	TV series; 13 episodes
2019	Brigada Costa del Sol	Terrón	TV series; 13 episodes
2022	Diary of a Gigolo	Emanuel Morillo	TV series; 10 episodes
