= Anna Soler-Pont =

Spanish writer

Anna Soler-Pont (2007)

Anna Soler-Pont (born 1968), is a Spanish writer. She was born in Barcelona, where she still lives.

After her studies of Arab Philology, she spent some time in Cairo, and an overland trip from Barcelona to New Delhi marked her professional career. In 1992 she founded Pontas Literary & Film Agency, representing a wide range of authors and maintaining its focus on multicultural projects. In 2005 she published an anthology of African stories and legends entitled A Marvellous Book of African Stories for Children. In 2007, she published the book Rastres de sàndal, co-authored with Asha Miró, which in 2014 was made into a film directed by Maria Ripoll.

== Sources ==
- "Asha Miró y Anna Soler-Pont escriben a dúo una novela" (in Spanish), El Pais, 14 Nov. 2006.
- "Asha Miró y Soler Pont retratan la globalización en positivo en 'Rastros de sándalo'" (in Spanish), El Pais, 2 Feb. 2007.
