= Fariña (TV series) =

Spanish crime drama television series

- TV series poster
- Also known as: Cocaine Coast
- Spanish: Fariña
- Genre: Crime drama Biographical
- Based on: Fariña by Nacho Carretero
- Directed by: Carlos Sedes; Jorge Torregrossa
- Starring: Javier Rey; Tristán Ulloa; Antonio Durán "Morris"; Carlos Blanco; Manuel Lourenzo; Xosé Antonio Touriñán; Isabel Naveira; Xúlio Abonjo; Tamar Novas; Eva Fernández; Fran Lareu; Monti Castiñeiras; Alfonso Agra; Machi Salgado; Carlos Sante; Miquel Fernández; Jana Pérez; Celso Bugallo; Juan Pablo Shuk; Marta Larralde; Bjornoo en samskiii
- Theme music composer: Federico Jusid
- Opening theme: "O que teño que facer para non ter que ir ó mar" by Iván Ferreiro
- Country of origin: Spain
- Original languages: Spanish (some dialogue in Galician)
- No. of seasons: 1
- No. of episodes: 10 (list of episodes)

Production
- Running time: 70 minutes
- Production companies: Bambú Producciones; Atresmedia

Original release
- Network: Antena 3
- Release: 28 February 2018

Cocaine Coast (Galician: Fariña, lit. 'Flour') is a Spanish crime drama television series created by Bambú Producciones for Atresmedia. The series is based on Nacho Carretero's nonfiction book Fariña (Flour, slang for cocaine in Galician). It premiered on Antena 3 on 28 February 2018. The series stars Javier Rey as Sito Miñanco, an infamous Galician drug trafficker. On 3 August 2018, the series premiered internationally on Netflix as Cocaine Coast.

== Premise ==
Sito Miñanco, a fisherman who is skilled in speedboat handling, starts to work in a tobacco smuggling ring led by Vicente Otero Pérez "Terito", the head of the Galician clans of the Ría de Arousa. Miñanco then starts his own ring alongside two friends. The different clans consider starting to traffic hashish, but Terito is against smuggling illegal drugs. Later, on a trip to Panama to launder money, Sito contacts traffickers who want to introduce cocaine into Europe through Galicia.

== Cast ==
=== Main cast ===
- Javier Rey as Sito Miñanco
- Tristán Ulloa as Sargento Darío Castro
- Antonio Durán "Morris" as Manuel Charlín
- Carlos Blanco as Laureano Oubiña
- Manuel Lourenzo as Vicento Otero Pérez "Terito"
- Xosé Antonio Touriñán as Paquito Charlín
- Isabel Naveira as Pilar Charlín
- Xúlio Abonjo as Moncho Charlín
- Tamar Novas as Roque
- Eva Fernández as Esther Lago
- Fran Lareu as Olegario Falcón Piñeiro "Oli"
- Monti Castiñeiras as Colombo
- Alfonso Agra as Manuel Bustelo
- Carlos Sante as Modesto Loval
- Miquel Fernández as Baltasar Garzón
- Jana Pérez as Camila Reyes
- Celso Bugallo as Padre de Sito (Sito's father)
- Juan Pablo Shuk as José Nelson Matta Ballesteros
- Marta Larralde as Nieves
- Harlys Becerra as Jorge Luis Ochoa

=== Recurring cast ===
- Mela Casal as Madre de Sito (Sito's mother)
- Cristina Iglesias as Leticia Charlín
- Milo Taboada as Montáñez
- Luisa Merelas as Amelia
- Mariana Carballal as Mujer de Terito (Terito's wife)
- Machi Salgado as Figueroa
- Ricardo de Barreiro as Montilla
- Iván Marcos as Braulio
- Christian Escuredo as Tati
- Nacho Castaño as Ricardo Portabales
- Pepo Suevos as Di Stéfano
- Xosé Manuel Esperante as Cándido Silva
- Iolanda Muíños as Carmen Avendaño
- Adrián Ríos as Miguel Abad "Petete"
- Xoel Fernández as Xulio Braña
- Víctor Mosqueira as Director de banco (Bank manager)

== Episodes ==
No.	Title	Directed by	Original release date	Viewers (in millions) (share)
1	"1981"	Carlos Sedes	February 28, 2018	3.399 (21.5%)
2	"1982"	Carlos Sedes	March 7, 2018	3.390 (21.3%)
3	"1983"	Carlos Sedes	March 14, 2018	2.759 (17.4%)
4	"1984"	Carlos Sedes	March 21, 2018	2.788 (17.7%)
5	"1985"	Carlos Sedes	April 4, 2018	2.622 (16.3%)
6	"1986"	Jorge Torregrossa	April 11, 2018	2.381 (14.5%)
7	"1987"	Jorge Torregrossa	April 18, 2018	2.166 (13.8%)
8	"1988"	Jorge Torregrossa	April 25, 2018	2.006 (12.6%)
9	"1989-1990"	Jorge Torregrossa	May 2, 2018	2.149 (13.5%)
10	"1990"	Carlos Sedes	May 9, 2018	2.014 (13.3%)

== See also ==
- Operation Necora
