= Los Charlines =

- Founded: 1975
- Founding location: Spain, Galicia
- Years active: 1975-present
- Territory: Spain, Portugal
- Ethnicity: Galicians
- Activities: Drug trafficking, Cigarette smuggling, Assassination, Money laundering.
- Allies: Medellin Cartel, Cali Cartel, Clan del Golfo, Corleonesi clan, Nuova Camorra Organizzata, Sinaloa Cartel
- Rivals: Os Caneos

Los Charlines (Galician: Os Charlíns) is the name by which one of the most important drug trafficking clans in Galicia is known, together with the Oubiña and the Miñanco. The clan is made up of Manuel Charlín Gama, his wife and their children Manuel, María Teresa, Melchor and Yolanda, and their cousin, Josefa.

== History ==
The beginnings of the clan are in the black market, the smuggling of food and other products during the Franco regime. Starting in 1975, the clan maintained business, introducing scrap metal and penicillin into Spain from Portugal. Later, they moved on to tobacco smuggling, where the blond batea was sold in bars in the 1980s and early 1990s. From the use of boats to smuggle tobacco, in many cases fishing, they turned to glider boats and with them to the hashish trade.

In the 1980s, Manuel Charlín was in jail for trying to kill a businessman from whom he claimed he owed him tobacco money. In the Modelo prison in Barcelona, he met several Colombian drug traffickers. In the early 1990s the business was divided into two gangs: on the one hand, the clans in favor of continuing with tobacco and hashish, and on the other, those who they switched to cocaine trafficking.

The group was finally dismantled by judge Baltasar Garzón in Operación Nécora against drug trafficking in 1990. In 1994, Manuel Baúlo, head of the Caneos clan, who had collaborated with Garzón by passing information, was assassinated. He was shot by Colombian hitmen at his home in Cambados and his wife was left in a wheelchair. A few months later, Manuel Charlín returned to jail. The group was reduced by police and judicial harassment, with heroin trafficking being the last business of which they were accused.

The Audiencia Nacional sentenced the Charlin couple and all their children to 104 years in prison for laundering money obtained with drugs. Three years later the Supreme Court partially overturned the ruling, lowering Manuel Charlín's sentence and absolving his daughter Teresa of him. The clan's patriarch spent 20 years in jail, having been released at the age of 78.

On 10 August 2018, Judge Juan Carlos Carballal of the Court of Instruction number 4 of Vigo released the Charlines and fourteen other detainees in the anti-drug operation. At the moment, twelve of them and nine of them have paraded before the judge, including the Charlines, have been released. Seven others involved in the operation were already free at the police headquarters.
