= A esmorga (film) =

- Film poster.jpg
- Directed by: Ignacio Vilar
- Written by: Carlos Asorey; Ignacio Vilar
- Produced by: Marina Fariñas; Ignacio Vilar
- Starring: Miguel de Lira; Karra Elejalde; Antonio Durán "Morris"
- Cinematography: Diego Romero
- Edited by: José M. G. Moyano
- Music by: Zeltia Montes
- Production company: Vía Láctea Filmes
- Release date: 21 November 2014
- Running time: 111 minutes
- Country: Spain
- Language: Galician

A esmorga is a 2014 Galician-language Spanish film directed by Ignacio Vilar. The film is adapted from the once-censored book A esmorga by Galician author Eduardo Blanco Amor. A European review called the film "an alcohol-fueled descent into Hell."

== Cast ==
- Miguel de Lira as Cibrán
- Karra Elejalde as Bocas
- Antonio Durán "Morris" as Milhomes
- Alfonso Agra as Pego
- Sabela Arán as Socorrito
- Melania Cruz as Raxada
- Lois Soaxe as Acacio
- Santi Prego as Cabito
- Pepo Suevos as Barrigas
- Covadonga Berdiñas as Tía Esquilacha
- Mela Casal as Nonó
- Mónica García as Costilleta
- Amelia Guede as Amelia
- Elena Seijo as Cupatrás
- Fina Calleja as Piolla
- Ledicia Sola as Viguesa
- Patxi Bisquert as Señor de Andrade
- Monti Castiñeiras as Cabaleiro
- Yago López as Lisardiño
