= Aces (film) =

- Film poster
- Galician: Os fenómenos
- Directed by: Alfonso Zarauza
- Screenplay by: Alfonso Zarauza; Jaione Camborda Coll
- Starring: Lola Dueñas; Luis Tosar; Juan Carlos Vellido; Miguel de Lira; Xúlio Abonjo; Xosé A. Touriñán; Gonzalo Uriarte; Patricia Vázquez; Antonio Durán «Morris»; Ledicia Sola; Federico Pérez
- Cinematography: Alberte Branco
- Edited by: Juan Carlos Arroyo
- Music by: Piti Sanz; Anxo Graña
- Production companies: ZircoZine; Maruxiña Film Company
- Distributed by: Surtsey Films
- Release dates: 23 March 2014 (Málaga); 12 December 2014 (Spain)
- Running time: 99 minutes
- Country: Spain
- Languages: Spanish; Galician

Aces (Galician: Os fenómenos) is a 2014 Spanish drama film directed by Alfonso Zarauza and co-written by Jaione Camborda. It stars Lola Dueñas, Luis Tosar, and Juan Carlos Vellido. It incorporates Spanish- and Galician-language dialogue.

== Plot ==
Living off-the-grid in a van in the Coast of Almería, Neneta is abandoned by her partner Lobo with her baby, and is forced to return to her birthplace in Ferrol, Galicia. She starts a stint as a construction worker in a work team involved in illegal buildings but her dreams about the future are shattered by the bursting of the Spanish property bubble.

== Cast ==
- Lola Dueñas as Neneta
- Luis Tosar as Lobo
- Juan Carlos Vellido as Furón
- Miguel de Lira as Balboa
- Xúlio Abonjo as Josué
- Xosé A. Touriñán
- Gonzalo Uriarte as Avelino
- Patricia Vázquez
- Antonio Durán "Morris"
- Ledicia Sola
- Federico Pérez
- Alfonso Agra as Barreiro

== Production ==
Aces was produced by ZircoZine and Maruxiña Film Company. It was shot in between Galicia (including Mugardos) and the coast of Almería.

== Release ==
The film was presented at the 17th Málaga Film Festival on 23 March 2014. It was also programmed at the Nantes Spanish Film Festival and the Cans Festival. Distributed by Surtsey Films, it was released theatrically in Spain on 12 December 2014.

== Reception ==
Sergio F. Pinilla of Cinemanía rated the film 3½ out of 5 stars, declaring it "a candid and bleak portrayal of love intertwined with [the portrayal of] the crisis".

Jonathan Holland of The Hollywood Reporter lauded the film as "a solidly built, well-played ensemble piece".

David González of Cineuropa singled out the film's "closeness" and "humility" as some of its strong points, as well as Lola Dueñas.

== Accolades ==
| Year | Award | Category | Nominee(s) | Result | Ref. |
|---|---|---|---|---|---|
| 2015 | 13th Mestre Mateo Awards | Best Film | | Won | |
| 2015 | 13th Mestre Mateo Awards | Best Director | Alfonso Zarauza | Won | |
| 2015 | 13th Mestre Mateo Awards | Best Screenplay | Alfonso Zarauza, Jaione Camborda | Won | |
| 2015 | 13th Mestre Mateo Awards | Best Supporting Actor | Xosé A. Touriñán | Nominated | |
| 2015 | 13th Mestre Mateo Awards | Best Supporting Actress | Ledicia Sola | Won | |
| 2015 | 13th Mestre Mateo Awards | Best Cinematography | Alberte Branco | Nominated | |
| 2015 | 13th Mestre Mateo Awards | Best Editing | Juan Carlos Arroyo | Nominated | |
| 2015 | 13th Mestre Mateo Awards | Best Original Score | Piti Sanz, Anxo Graña | Nominated | |
| 2015 | 13th Mestre Mateo Awards | Best Art Direction | Curru Garabal | Nominated | |
| 2015 | 13th Mestre Mateo Awards | Best Costume Design | Alicia Dapena, Lola Dapena | Nominated | |
| 2015 | 13th Mestre Mateo Awards | Best Makeup and Hairstyles | Fany Bello, Raquel Fidalgo | Nominated | |

== See also ==
- List of Spanish films of 2014
