= Aroa Gimeno =

Spanish actress

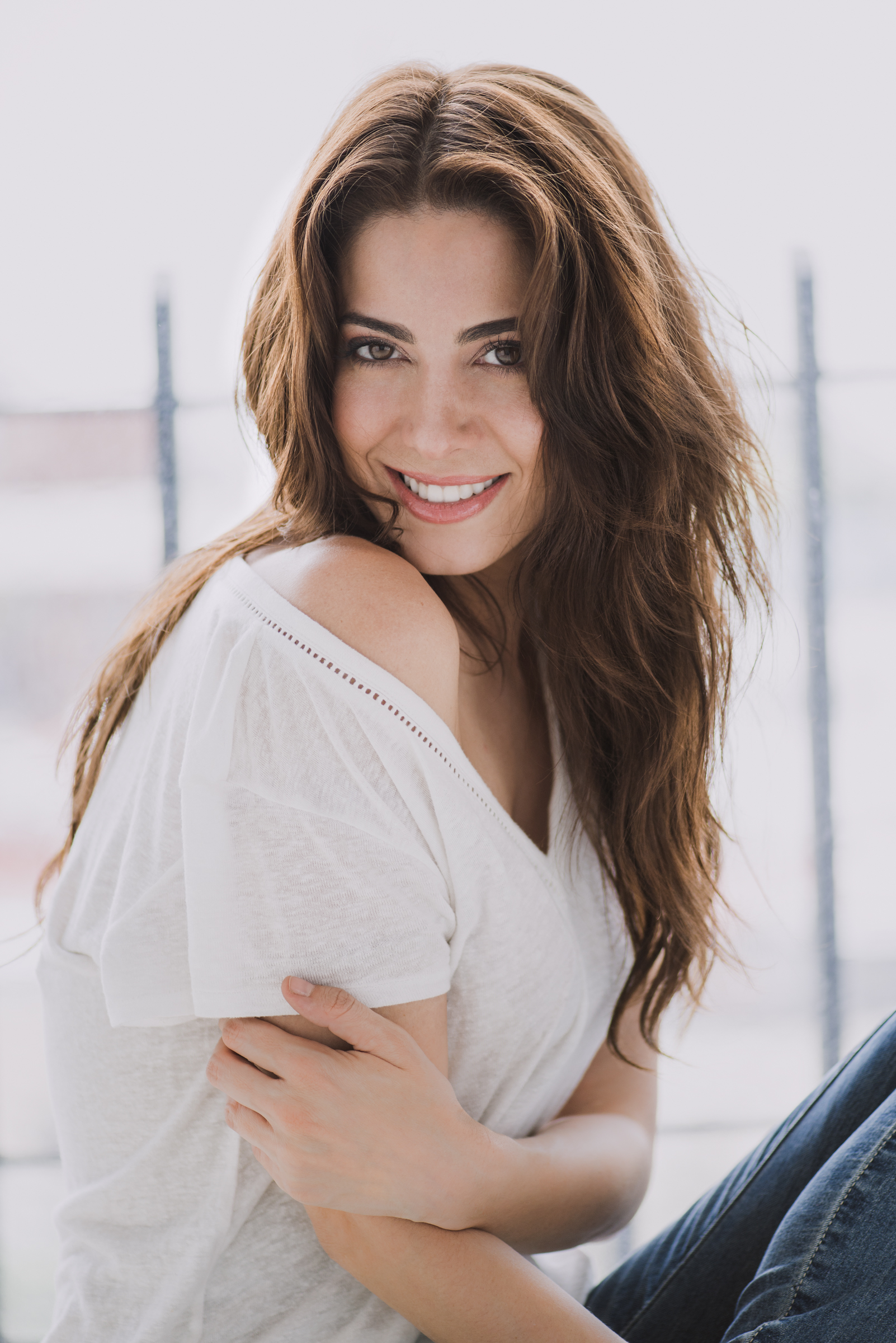
- Born: Aroa Gimeno; Baracaldo, Biscay, Spain
- Occupations: Actress; model
- Years active: 2004–present

Aroa Gimeno is a Spanish actress and model who came to prominence in Spain as Sonia in the laSexta teen drama SMS, sin miedo a soñar (2006–2007) and who, after relocating to Mexico, has worked in international television and film, including the Netflix series Capo: el amo del túnel and El rey, Vicente Fernández and the Televisa telenovela La Piloto 2.

== Early life and career in Spain ==
Gimeno was born in Baracaldo, in the Biscay province of the Spanish Basque Country; in interviews she has described herself as being from Bilbao. She made her screen debut in 2004 in the television film El precio de una miss, which opened the way to roles in the series Lobos, El comisario, Cuenta atrás, Amar en tiempos revueltos, Sin tetas no hay paraíso and Valientes.

Her best-known Spanish role came with the youth series SMS, sin miedo a soñar, produced by Globomedia, in which she played Sonia from 2006 and which served as a launching pad for actors such as Amaia Salamanca and María Castro. In 2009 she joined the third season of Telecinco's Sin tetas no hay paraíso as Laura Moro, appearing across nine episodes.

== Career in Mexico ==
A film project led Gimeno to move to Mexico City in 2013 to arrange her work and residence permits, and she has since been based largely in Mexico, where she has taken Mexican nationality.

In the Netflix miniseries Capo: el amo del túnel (2016), inspired by the life of Joaquín "El Chapo" Guzmán, she played Sofía, a Mexican journalist who runs a blog about drug trafficking and is harassed and extorted by criminals; the Basque newspaper Gara described the role as that of a journalist who specialises in narcotics and suffers constant intimidation. The following year she publicly criticised the pay gap for supporting actors in major Latin American productions, writing that she would not film seven episodes of a series for 1,000 euros.

In 2018 she joined the second season of the Televisa and Univisión telenovela La Piloto, led by Livia Brito and Arap Bethke, as the lawyer Ana San Miguel, a character introduced in the thirtieth of the season's eighty episodes.

In 2020 she took her first leading film role in Mexico in the psychological thriller Animales humanos, directed by Lex Ortega and released on Prime Video, in which she played Anahí, an animal-rights activist. She has described the film as a psychological thriller rather than a conventional horror picture.

In 2022 she appeared as Maritza in the biographical series El rey, Vicente Fernández, produced by Caracol Televisión for Netflix about the Mexican ranchera singer Vicente Fernández, appearing in ten episodes.

== Selected filmography ==
=== Television ===
Year	Title	Role
2005	Lobos	
2005	El comisario	
2006–2007	SMS, sin miedo a soñar	Sonia
2007	Cuenta atrás	
2008	Amar en tiempos revueltos	Maribel
2008	700 euros, diario secreto de una call girl	Cristina
2009	Sin tetas no hay paraíso	Laura Moro
2010	Valientes	Gema
2014	La sombra del pasado	
2016	Capo: el amo del túnel	Sofía
2018	La Piloto 2	Ana San Miguel
2022	El rey, Vicente Fernández	Maritza

=== Film ===
Year	Title	Role	Notes
2004	El precio de una miss		Television film
2008	8 citas	Laura	
2009	Amanecer de un sueño	Bea	
2011	Amor sacro		
2015	Karma		Television film
2016	Desde tu infierno	Alejandra	
2020	Animales humanos	Anahí	
