= María Vázquez =

Spanish actress (born 1979)

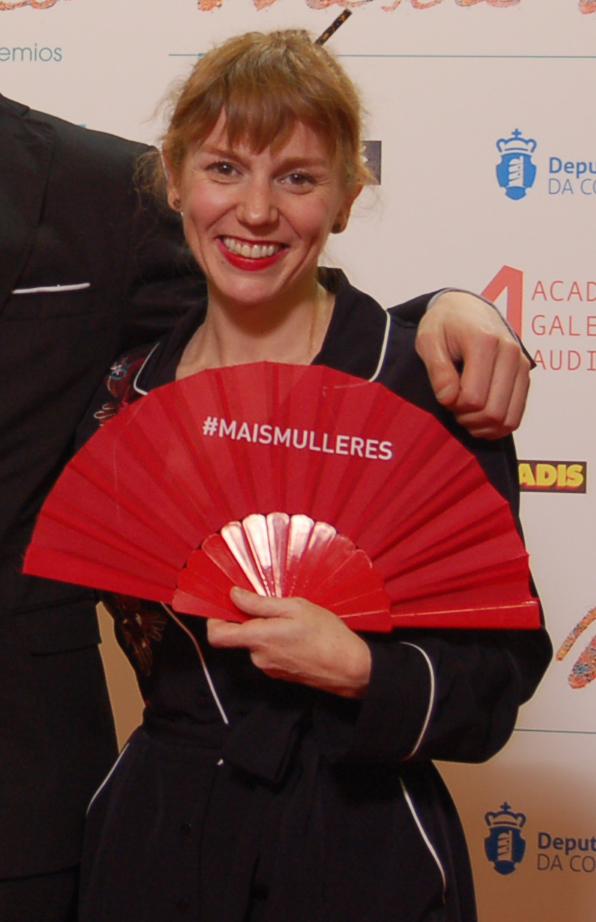
- Vázquez in 2017
- Born: 19 March 1979 (age 47); Vigo, Spain
- Occupation: Actress

María Vázquez (born 19 March 1979) is a Spanish actress from Galicia.

== Biography ==
Born in Vigo on 19 March 1979, she was raised however in between the provinces of Ourense and Lugo. She appeared as a child in Sempre Xonxa. Upon completing her Baccalaureate studies, she moved to Madrid to pursue a dancing career, but switched to acting and joined the Juan Carlos Corazza workshop.

Early film roles include credits in Saint Bernard (2000), Broken Silence (2001), Desire (2002), The Year of the Tick (2004), The Night of the Brother (2005), and The Idiot Maiden (2006).

She won the 2007 Critical Eye Award. She earned nominations for the Goya Award for Best Supporting Actress for her performance in Mataharis (2007) and Goya Award for Best Actress for Matria (2024).

== Accolades ==
| Year | Award | Category | Work | Result | Ref. |
|---|---|---|---|---|---|
| 2008 | 22nd Goya Awards | Best Supporting Actress | Mataharis | Nominated | |
| 2020 | 18th Mestre Mateo Awards | Best Supporting Actress | Eye for an Eye | Won | |
| 2022 | 20th Mestre Mateo Awards | Best Supporting Actress | Cuñados | Nominated | |
| 2023 | 21st Mestre Mateo Awards | Best Actress | The Open Body | Nominated | |
| 2023 | 26th Málaga Film Festival | Silver Biznaga for Best Actress | Matria | Won | |
| 2023 | 29th Forqué Awards | Best Actress in a Film | Matria | Nominated | |
| 2024 | 11th Feroz Awards | Best Actress in a Film | Matria | Nominated | |
| 2024 | 38th Goya Awards | Best Actress | Matria | Nominated | |
