= Jump! (2023 film) =

- Theatrical release poster
- Spanish: ¡Salta!
- Directed by: Olga Osorio
- Screenplay by: Olga Osorio; Araceli Gonda
- Produced by: Emma Lustres; Borja Pena
- Starring: Tamar Novas; Marta Nieto; Mario Santos; Mabel Rivera; Manuel Manquiña; Rubén Fulgencio; Irene Jiménez; Saúl Esgueva
- Cinematography: Elías M. Félix
- Edited by: Mario Maroto
- Music by: Manuel Riveiro
- Production companies: Vaca Films; Quien a hierro mata AIE
- Distributed by: A Contracorriente Films
- Release date: 1 September 2023
- Country: Spain
- Language: Spanish

Jump! (Spanish: ¡Salta!) is a 2023 Spanish science fiction comedy film directed by Olga Osorio which stars Tamar Novas, Marta Nieto, Mario Santos, and Rubén Fulgencio.

== Plot ==
In 2022, sullen scientist Óscar, son to a scientist obsessed with wormholes, and himself tormented by the disappearance of his younger brother Teo in 1989, meets again with playful and football-loving Teo, who has seemingly time travelled from 1989.

== Cast ==
- Tamar Novas as Óscar (adult)
- Marta Nieto as Elena
- Mario Santos as Teo
- Mabel Rivera
- Manuel Manquiña
- Rubén Fulgencio as Óscar (child)
- Irene Jiménez
- Saúl Esgueva

== Production ==
The screenplay was penned by Olga Osorio alongside Araceli Gonda. The film was known under the working title Un pasado por delante. It was produced by Vaca Films and Quien a hierro mata AIE, with the participation of Prime Video, RTVE, TVG, funding from ICAA, AGADIC and backing from MEDIA. Shooting locations included Barrio de las Flores, A Coruña.

== Release ==
Distributed by A Contracorriente Films, the film was released theatrically in Spain on 1 September 2023.

== Reception ==
Raquel Hernández Luján of HobbyConsolas scored the film with 75 points ('good'), deeming it to be "a touching, well-assembled film with good performances despite being a modest production".

Salvador Llopart of La Vanguardia rated the film 3 out of 5 stars, deeming it to be "an endearing story, funny and nostalgic at the same time", yet pointing out that "a little narrative daring would have suited it better".

== Accolades ==
Year	Award	Category	Nominee(s)	Result	Ref.
2024	22nd Mestre Mateo Awards	Best Film		Nominated	
2024	22nd Mestre Mateo Awards	Best Director	Olga Osorio	Nominated	
2024	22nd Mestre Mateo Awards	Best Screenplay	Olga Osorio, Araceli Gonda	Nominated	
2024	22nd Mestre Mateo Awards	Best Actor	Tamar Novas	Won	
2024	22nd Mestre Mateo Awards	Best Original Score	Manuel Riveiro	Nominated	
2024	22nd Mestre Mateo Awards	Best Sound	Carlos Mouriño, David Machado, Javier Pato	Nominated	
2024	22nd Mestre Mateo Awards	Best Costume Design	Ana López	Nominated	
2024	22nd Mestre Mateo Awards	Best Makeup and Hairstyles	Susana Veira, Beatriz Antelo, Antonio Naranjo	Nominated	

== See also ==
- List of Spanish films of 2023
