= Matria (2023 film) =

- Theatrical release poster
- Directed by: Álvaro Gago
- Screenplay by: Álvaro Gago
- Produced by: Daniel Froiz; María Zamora; Stefan Schmitz; Mireia Graell Vivancos
- Starring: María Vázquez; Soraya Luaces; E.R. Cunha "Tatán"; Susana Sampedro; Santi Prego
- Cinematography: Lucía C. Pan
- Edited by: Ricardo Saraiva
- Music by: Patricia Cadaveira; Marcel Pascual
- Production companies: Matriuska Producciones; Avalon PC; Elastica Films; Ringo Media
- Distributed by: Avalon
- Release dates: 17 February 2023 (Berlinale); 24 March 2023 (Spain)
- Country: Spain
- Language: Galician

Matria is a 2023 Spanish social drama film directed by Álvaro Gago (in his feature debut) which stars María Vázquez. It is shot in Galician.

== Plot ==
Set in a Galician fishing village, the plot follows the plight of Ramona, a financially-insecure working woman struggling to stay afloat.

== Cast ==
- María Vázquez as Ramona
- Santi Prego as Andrés
- Soraya Luaces as Estrella
- E.R. Cunha "Tatán" as Xosé
- Susana Sampedro as Carme

== Production ==
The story is freely based on the life of Francisca Iglesias, a woman who took care of Gago's grandfather, and who starred in Gago's short film of the same name. María Vázquez took over the protagonist role (Ramona) for the feature film, playing a younger version of the character. Iglesias plays a minor role in the film. The film was produced by Pontevedra's Matriuska Producciones, Madrid's Avalon PC, Valencia's Elastica Films, and Barcelona's Ringo Media. Fully shot in Galician, María Vázquez (raised in the province of Lugo) faced the challenge of adapting her Galician to the variety from the Rías Baixas.

== Release ==
The film made its world premiere on 17 February 2023 at the 73rd Berlin International Film Festival, screened in the festival's Panorama lineup. Prior to its domestic theatrical release, it was presented at the 26th Málaga Film Festival on 11 March 2023. It was released theatrically in Spain on 24 March 2023 by Avalon.

== Reception ==
Jonathan Holland of ScreenDaily, warning that "anyone looking for a plucky, against-the odds storyline told through the eyes of a victim of injustice has come to the wrong place", highlighted one of the film's key virtues being that [the protagonist] "is fallible and self-destructive".

Marta Bałaga of Cineuropa deemed the film to be "a welcome take on social cinema", otherwise featuring a protagonist [Ramona] that "feels real and fun to follow, even though one can run out of breath".

Andrea G. Bermejo of Cinemanía rated the film 3½ out of 5 stars, considering that Vázquez nails each the nuances of her character.

== Accolades ==
Year	Award	Category	Nominee(s)	Result	Ref.
2023	26th Málaga Film Festival	Silver Biznaga for Best Actress	María Vázquez	Won	
2023	49th Seattle International Film Festival	Ibero-American Competition Special Jury Prize - Actress	María Vázquez	Won	
2023	29th Forqué Awards	Best Actress in a Film	María Vázquez	Nominated	
2024	11th Feroz Awards	Best Actress in a Film	María Vázquez	Nominated	
2024	79th CEC Medals	Best New Director	Álvaro Gago	Nominated	
2024	38th Goya Awards	Best Actress	María Vázquez	Nominated	
2024	38th Goya Awards	Best New Director	Álvaro Gago	Nominated	
2024	22nd Mestre Mateo Awards	Best Film		Nominated	
2024	22nd Mestre Mateo Awards	Best Director	Álvaro Gago	Nominated	
2024	22nd Mestre Mateo Awards	Best Screenplay	Álvaro Gago	Nominated	
2024	22nd Mestre Mateo Awards	Best Actress	María Vázquez	Won	
2024	22nd Mestre Mateo Awards	Best Supporting Actress	Susana Sampedro	Won	
2024	22nd Mestre Mateo Awards	Best Supporting Actor	Eduardo Alberto Rodríguez Cunha 'Tatán'	Nominated	
2024	22nd Mestre Mateo Awards	Best Supporting Actor	Santi Prego	Won	
2024	22nd Mestre Mateo Awards	Best Cinematography	Lucía C. Pan	Won	
2024	22nd Mestre Mateo Awards	Best Editing	Ricardo Saraiva	Nominated	
2024	22nd Mestre Mateo Awards	Best Production Supervision	Nati Juncal	Won	
2024	22nd Mestre Mateo Awards	Best Sound	Xavier Souto, Diego Staub	Nominated	
2024	22nd Mestre Mateo Awards	Best Makeup and Hairstyles	Sonia García	Nominated	

== See also ==
- List of Spanish films of 2023
