= The Open Body =

2022 film by Ángeles Huerta

- Theatrical release poster
- Galician: O corpo aberto
- Directed by: Ángeles Huerta
- Screenplay by: Ángeles Huerta; Daniel D. García
- Based on: "Lobosandaus" by Xosé Luís Méndez Ferrín
- Produced by: Gaspar Broullón; Adrià Monés; Ana Costa; Sonia Costa
- Starring: Tamar Novas; Victória Guerra; María Vázquez; Nicolás Otero; Elena Seijo; José Fidalgo; Federico Pérez; Miquel Ínsua
- Cinematography: Gina Ferrer
- Edited by: Sandra Sánchez
- Music by: Mercedes Peón
- Production companies: Fasten Films; OlloVivo; Cinemate
- Distributed by: Filmax
- Release dates: September 2022 (MotelX); 9 December 2022 (Spain)
- Countries: Spain; Portugal
- Languages: Galician; Portuguese; Spanish

The Open Body (Galician: O corpo aberto) is a 2022 Gothic folk horror drama film directed by Ángeles Huerta from a screenplay by Huerta and Daniel D. García, based on the story "Lobosandaus" by Xosé Luís Méndez Ferrín. It stars Tamar Novas alongside María Vázquez and Victória Guerra. It was primarily shot in Galician and Portuguese.

== Plot ==
Set in 1909, the plot follows Miguel, a teacher destined to the fictional Galician village of Lobosandaus, in the border between Spain and Portugal. After his arrival to the village, he meets with Obdulia, a woman seemingly possessed by the spirit of her sister-in-law Dorinda's former (male) lover. Miguel, a man of reason, begins to question himself about the supernatural.

== Cast ==
- Tamar Novas as Miguel
- María Vázquez as Obdulia
- Victória Guerra as Dorinda
- Nicolás Otero as Clamores
- Elena Seijo as Aparecida
- José Fidalgo as Mauro
- Federico Pérez as Turelo
- Miquel Insua as Don Fernando
- Izan González as Martín

== Production ==
The screenplay was written by Ángeles Huerta and Daniel D. García, based on Xosé Luís Méndez Ferrín's story "Lobosandaus" (from the book Arraianos). The film is a Spanish-Portuguese co-production by OlloVivo (Galicia), Fasten Films (Catalonia), and Cinemate (Portugal), with support of AGADIC and ICAA. Shooting locations included Muíños, Lobeira, and Calvos de Randín (all in the Spanish province of Ourense) and the Portuguese villages of Tourém and Pitões (both in Montalegre). It was primarily shot in Galician and Portuguese, also featuring dialogue in Spanish.

== Release ==
Filmax acquired international rights to the film. The Open Body's festival run included screenings at the Lisbon International Horror Film Festival (MOTELX), the Ourense International Film Festival, the 67th Valladolid International Film Festival (Seminci), and the 60th Gijón International Film Festival. It was released theatrically in Spain on 9 December 2022.

== Reception ==
Pablo Vázquez of Fotogramas rated the film 3 out of 5 stars, highlighting Novas (in his best performance to date) as the film's standout while citing's the film's "somewhat cumbersome" narration as a negative point.

Santiago Alverú of Cinemanía rated the film 3½ stars, summing it up as "an honest search for the ghost of the evil dreamed".

Miguel Anxo Fernández of La Voz de Galicia deemed The Open Body to be "an honest, brave and well-finished film, destined to last", confirming Ángeles Huerta as "a solvent and welcome director" in the scope of fiction.

== Accolades ==
Year	Award	Category	Nominee(s)	Result	Ref.
2021	21st Mestre Mateo Awards	Best Film		Won	
2021	21st Mestre Mateo Awards	Best Director	Ángeles Huerta	Won	
2021	21st Mestre Mateo Awards	Best Screenplay	Ángeles Huerta, Daniel D. García	Won	
2021	21st Mestre Mateo Awards	Best Actor	Tamar Novas	Won	
2021	21st Mestre Mateo Awards	Best Actress	María Vázquez	Nominated	
2021	21st Mestre Mateo Awards	Best Actress	Victoria Guerra	Nominated	
2021	21st Mestre Mateo Awards	Best Supporting Actress	Elena Seijo	Nominated	
2021	21st Mestre Mateo Awards	Best Supporting Actor	Federico Pérez Rey	Won	
2021	21st Mestre Mateo Awards	Best Cinematography	Gina Ferrer	Won	
2021	21st Mestre Mateo Awards	Best Editing	Sandra Sánchez	Nominated	
2021	21st Mestre Mateo Awards	Best Original Score	Mercedes Peón	Won	
2021	21st Mestre Mateo Awards	Best Production Supervision	Tamara Soto Mato	Won	
2021	21st Mestre Mateo Awards	Best Art Direction	Antonio Pereira	Won	
2021	21st Mestre Mateo Awards	Best Sound	Diego Staub, Jordi Rossinyol	Won	
2021	21st Mestre Mateo Awards	Best Costume Design	Teresa Sousa	Won	
2021	21st Mestre Mateo Awards	Best Makeup and Hairstyles	Raquel Fidalgo, Noé Montes, María Barreiro	Won	

== See also ==
- List of Spanish films of 2022
