= Pratos combinados =

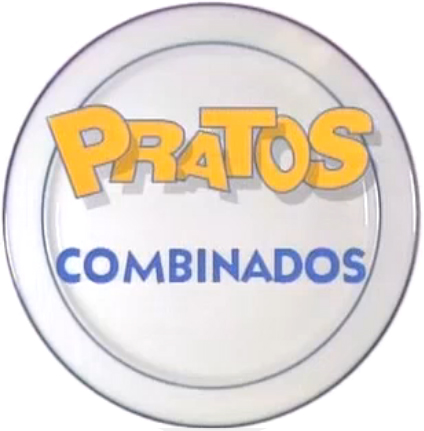
- Genre: Sitcom
- Created by: Xosé Cermeño
- Directed by: Chema Fernández
- Country of origin: Spain
- Original language: Galician
- No. of seasons: 14
- No. of episodes: 261

Production
- Running time: 30 min. (seasons 1–6); 60 min. (seasons 7–14)
- Production companies: Televisión de Galicia; Editorial Compostela

Original release
- Network: Televisión de Galicia
- Release: 1 December 1995 – 24 May 2006

Pratos combinados (lit. transl. Combination meals) is a Spanish prime-time Galician language television sitcom which was broadcast on Televisión de Galicia from 1 December 1995 to 24 May 2006. It was the first sitcom developed entirely by Galician professionals and starring Galician actors.

Created by Xosé Cermeño, it was produced by Televisión de Galicia (TVG) and Editorial Compostela for fourteen seasons with 261 episodes in total.

== Plot ==
Married couple Miro Pereira and Balbina Santos run a bar named "Bar Suizo" in a small Galician town after coming back from living in Switzerland. Miro, who is a greedy, lazy, not very clean, whiner and clumsy man, continually devises plans together with his brother-in-law Antón Santos to go hunting, fishing, earn easy money or work even less than the little he does, which never turn out as expected.

== Cast ==
Character	Portrayed by	Seasons													
Character	Portrayed by	1	2	3	4	5	6	7	8	9	10	11	12	13	14
Ramiro Pereira Ríos	Ernesto Chao	Main	Main	Main	Main	Main	Main	Main	Main	Main	Main	Main	Main	Main	Main
Balbina Santos	Mabel Rivera	Main	Main	Main	Main	Main	Main	Main	Main	Main	Main	Main	Main		
Antón Santos	Antonio Durán "Morris"	Main	Main	Main	Main	Main	Main	Main	Main	Main	Main	Main	Main	Main	Main
Rosalía Pereira Santos	Eva Fernández	Main	Main	Main	Main	Main	Main								
Miguel Pereira Santos	Braulio Veiga	Main	Main	Main	Main	Main	Main								
Carmen Ríos	Fely Manzano	Main	Main	Main	Main	Main	Main	Main	Main	Main	Main	Main	Main	Main	Main
Pedro Barreiro	Xosé Manuel Olveira							Main	Main	Main	Main	Main	Main	Main	Main
Paula Barreiro	Cristina Castaño							Main	Main						
Paula Barreiro	María Castro									Main	Main	Main	Main	Main	Main

== Episodes ==
Season	Episodes	Originally released	
Season	Episodes	First released	Last released
1	13	1 December 1995	23 February 1996
2	13	8 March 1996	31 May 1996
3	12	17 January 1997	4 April 1997
4	13	11 April 1997	27 June 1997
5	27	11 March 1998	14 January 1999
6	26	27 January 1999	21 July 1999
7	13	21 March 2000	28 June 2000
8	13	11 April 2001	11 July 2001
9	13	17 October 2001	9 January 2002
10	13	16 January 2002	10 April 2002
11	26	24 July 2002	4 June 2003
12	28	1 November 2003	29 August 2004
13	26	9 October 2004	4 May 2005
14	25	30 November 2005	24 May 2006

== Accolades ==
Awards	Date	Category	Awardee	Result	Ref
Chano Piñeiro Awards	7 April 2002	Best Actor	Ernesto Chao	Nominated	
1st Mestre Mateo Awards	7 June 2003				
1st Mestre Mateo Awards	7 June 2003	Best Actor	Antonio Durán "Morris"	Nominated	
1st Mestre Mateo Awards	7 June 2003	Best Actress	Mabel Rivera	Nominated	
1st Mestre Mateo Awards	7 June 2003	Best Supporting Actress	Mónica García	Nominated	
1st Mestre Mateo Awards	7 June 2003	Best Script	Xosé Cermeño	Nominated	
1st Mestre Mateo Awards	7 June 2003	Best TV series	Editorial Compostela and TVG	Won	
1st Mestre Mateo Awards	7 June 2003	Best Soundtrack	Nani García	Nominated	
1st Mestre Mateo Awards	7 June 2003	Best Producer	Chema Fernández	Nominated	
2nd Mestre Mateo Awards	26 June 2004	Best Actor	Antonio Durán "Morris"	Nominated	
3rd Mestre Mateo Awards	20 March 2005	Best TV series	Editorial Compostela and TVG	Nominated	
4th Mestre Mateo Awards	19 March 2006	Best Actor	Antonio Durán "Morris"	Nominated	
4th Mestre Mateo Awards	19 March 2006	Best Actor	Ernesto Chao	Nominated	
4th Mestre Mateo Awards	19 March 2006	Best Supporting Actor	Manuel Millán	Nominated	
