= Tamar Novas =

Spanish actor

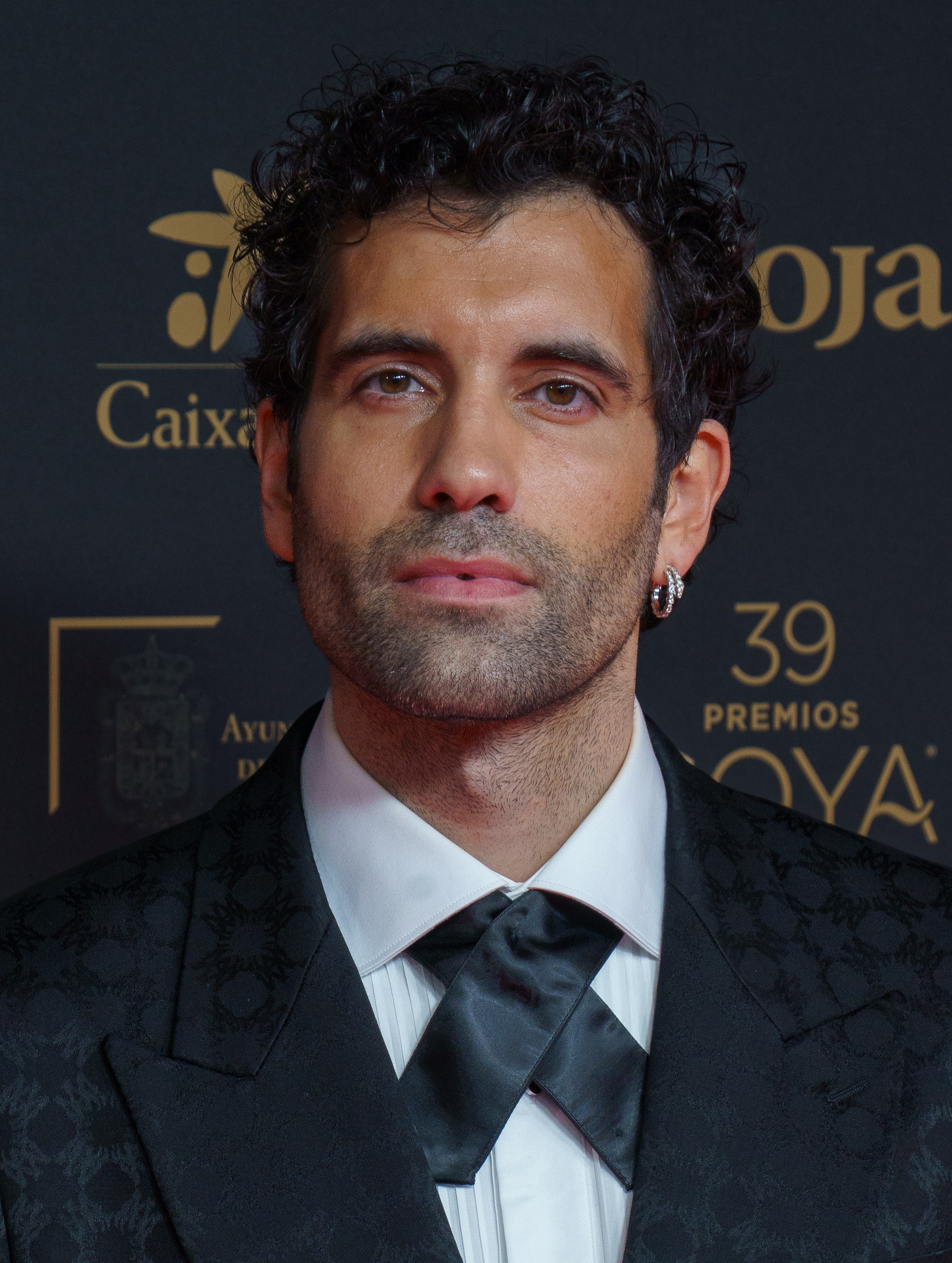
- Novas in 2025
- Born: Tamar Novas Pita; 3 October 1986 (age 40); Santiago de Compostela, Galicia, Spain
- Occupation: Actor
- Years active: 1997–present

Tamar Novas Pita (born 3 October 1986) is a Spanish actor.

== Biography ==
Tamar Novas Pita was born in Santiago de Compostela, Galicia, on 3 October 1986. He was cast for a minor role in José Luis Cuerda's Butterfly's Tongue in his early 10s, thus making his film debut. Likewise, he had his debut in a television series with a performance in the Galician A vida por diante. At age 16, he was cast as Ramón Sampedro's nephew in Alejandro Amenábar's The Sea Inside, a performance for which he won the Goya Award for Best New Actor. He also performed a blind screenwriter's guide in Broken Embraces. He has since featured in television series such as Acusados, Bandolera, (Note: Where he met his partner until 2023, Belén Cuesta.) Carlos, rey emperador, Cocaine Coast or Gangs of Galicia.

== Filmography ==
=== Film ===
| Year | Title | Role | Notes | | Ref. |
|---|---|---|---|---|
| 1999 | La lengua de las mariposas (Butterfly's Tongue) | Roque | Film debut | |
| 2004 | Mar adentro (The Sea Inside) | Javi | | |
| 2009 | Los abrazos rotos (Broken Embraces) | Diego | | |
| 2014 | Un otoño sin Berlín (An Autumn Without Berlin) | Diego | | |
| 2019 | Elisa y Marcela (Elisa & Marcela) | Andrés | | |
| 2021 | A 1000 kilómetros de la navidad (1000 Miles from Christmas) | Raúl | | |
| 2022 | O corpo aberto (The Open Body) | Miguel | | |
| 2023 | ¡Salta! (Jump!) | Óscar | | |
| 2023 | Nowhere | Nico | | |
| 2024 | Justicia artificial (Artificial Justice) | Brais | | |
| 2025 | 8 | | | |
| 2025 | Rondallas (Band Together) | Xoel | | |
| 2025 | Parecido a un asesinato (Hidden Murder) | José | | |
| 2026 | Caminando con el diablo (The Devil Within) | Miguel | | |
| 2026 | Colisión (Collision Course) | Tomás | | |

=== Television ===
| Year | Title | Role | Notes | | Ref. |
|---|---|---|---|---|
| 2010 | Acusados | Jaime Álvarez | Introduced in season 2 | |
| 2012 | Bandolera | Alejandro de la Serna | | |
| 2015–16 | Carlos, rey emperador | Juan III de Portugal | | |
| 2017 | El ministerio del tiempo | Gustavo Adolfo Bécquer | Guest. Episode: "Tiempo de hechizos" | |
| 2017 | La zona | Ricardo | | |
| 2018 | Fariña (Cocaine Coast) | Roque | | |
| 2018 | Allí abajo | Yago Castro | | |
| 2019 | Alta mar (High Seas) | Sebastián | | |
| 2020 | El desorden que dejas (The Mess You Leave Behind) | Germán Araujo | | |
| 2023 | Los pacientes del doctor García (The Patients of Dr. García) | Manuel Arroyo Benítez | | |
| 2024 | Clanes (Gangs of Galicia) | Daniel Padín | | |

== Accolades ==
| Year | Award | Category | Work | Result | Ref. |
|---|---|---|---|---|---|
| 2005 | 19th Goya Awards | Best New Actor | The Sea Inside | Won | |
| 2005 | 14th Actors and Actresses Union Awards | Best New Actor | The Sea Inside | Won | |
| 2021 | 19th Mestre Mateo Awards | Best Supporting Actor | The Mess You Leave Behind | Nominated | |
| 2023 | 21st Mestre Mateo Awards | Best Actor | The Open Body | Won | |
| 2024 | 22nd Mestre Mateo Awards | Best Actor | Jump! | Won | |
| 2026 | 40th Goya Awards | Best Supporting Actor | Band Together | Pending | |
