= Memoirs of a Man in Pajamas =

- Theatrical release poster
- Directed by: Carlos FerFer
- Screenplay by: Ángel de la Cruz; Diana López; Paco Roca
- Based on: Memoirs of a Man in Pajamas by Paco Roca
- Produced by: Alex Cervantes; Manuel Cristóbal; Ángel de la Cruz; Jordi Mendieta
- Starring: Raúl Arévalo; María Castro
- Cinematography: Marcos García Cabeza
- Edited by: Omar Bermúdez
- Music by: Love of Lesbian
- Production companies: Dream Team Concept; Ladybug Films; Movistar Plus+ Televisión de Galicia (TVG); RTVE
- Release dates: April 14, 2018 (Málaga); January 4, 2019 (Spain)
- Running time: 74 minutes
- Country: Spain
- Language: Spanish

Memoirs of a Man in Pajamas (Spanish: Memorias de un hombre en pijama) is a 2018 Spanish adult animated romantic comedy film directed by Carlos FerFer (in his directorial debut) from a screenplay written by Ángel de la Cruz, Diana López and Paco Roca. It is based on the comic of the same name by Paco Roca. It stars the voices of Raúl Arévalo and María Castro accompanied by Manuel Manquiña, Santi Balmes, Julián Saldarriaga, Jordi Brunet, Tacho González and Elena S. Sánchez.

== Synopsis ==
Paco is an inveterate single forty-year-old who manages to fulfill his childhood dream: working from home and in his pajamas. But just when he thought he had found the height of happiness, Jilguero bursts into his life, the girl he falls in love with and who will have to fight to stay by the side of a man whose main objective in life is to stay home in his pajamas.

== Cast ==
The actors participating in this film are:

- Raúl Arévalo as Paco
- María Castro as Jilguero
- Manuel Manquiña as Messenger
- Santi Balmes as Escorpio
- Julián Saldarriaga as Tauro
- Tacho González as Mr. Burguer
- Jordi Brunet as Leo
- Jordi Llovet as Newspaper manager
- Elena S. Sánchez as Interviewer
- Claudia Carreras as Géminis

== Production ==
Memoirs of a Man in Pajamas is composed of 80% animation and 20% real images, the scenes with real actors were filmed in the first week of March 2017 in Madrid, Spain.

== Release ==
It had its world premiere on April 14, 2018, at the Málaga Film Festival, being the first animated film to be presented at the festival. It was released commercially on January 4, 2019, in Spanish theaters.

== Reception ==
=== Critical reception ===
Luis Martínez from El Mundo criticizes the film's script, calling it tired and clumsy about some rude "old men". Enric Alberto from Caimán Cuadernos de Cine called the film outdated as it fails to tell anything, he also negatively criticizes how repetitive the music of Love of Lesbian becomes and the acting diction that is embarrassing. Juan Pando from Fotogramas highlights the unoriginal script of the production that fails to retain viewers throughout its duration along with mediocre voice acting and endless and embarrassing dialogues.

=== Accolades ===
Year	Award	Category	Recipient	Result	Ref.
2018	Málaga Film Festival	Golden Biznaga	Memoirs of a Man in Pajamas	Nominated	
2019	Platino Awards	Best Animated Film	Memoirs of a Man in Pajamas	Nominated	
2019	Mestre Mateo Awards	Best Film	Memoirs of a Man in Pajamas	Nominated	
2019	Mestre Mateo Awards	Best Original Music	Santi Balmes, Julián Saldarriaga & Daniel Ferrer	Nominated	
2019	Mestre Mateo Awards	Best Screenplay	Ángel de la Cruz, Diana López & Paco Roca	Nominated	
2019	Círculo de Escritores Cinematográficos	Best Animated Feature Film	Memoirs of a Man in Pajamas	Nominated	
2019	Goya Awards	Best Animated Film	Memoirs of a Man in Pajamas	Nominated	
2019	Gaudí Awards	Best Animated Feature Film	Carlos Fernández de Vigo	Won	
