= Your Next Life =

- Theatrical release poster
- Spanish: La vida que te espera
- Directed by: Manuel Gutiérrez Aragón
- Screenplay by: Ángeles González Sinde; Manuel Gutiérrez Aragón
- Produced by: Gerardo Herrero; Pancho Casal
- Starring: Juan Diego; Luis Tosar; Marta Etura; Clara Lago; Celso Bugallo; Víctor Clavijo
- Cinematography: Gonzalo Berridi
- Edited by: José Salcedo
- Music by: Xavier Capellas
- Production companies: Tornasol Films; Continental Producciones; Televisión de Galicia
- Distributed by: Alta Classics
- Release dates: 30 January 2004 (Spain); 9 February 2004 (Berlinale)
- Country: Spain
- Language: Spanish

Your Next Life (Spanish: La vida que te espera) is a 2004 Spanish rural thriller and romantic drama film directed by Manuel Gutiérrez Aragón. It stars Juan Diego, Luis Tosar and Marta Etura alongside Clara Lago, Celso Bugallo and Víctor Clavijo.

== Plot ==
The plot is set in northern Spain. Over a cow-related row also involving the Severo's kidnapping of Val (Gildo's daughter), Gildo kills Severo. Val and Rai (Severo's son, unbeknownst of the identity of his father's killer) fall romantically for each other.

== Cast ==
- Juan Diego as Gildo
- Luis Tosar as Rai
- Marta Etura as Val
- Clara Lago as Genia
- Celso Bugallo as Severo
- Víctor Clavijo
- José Manuel Olveira
- Manuel Millán
- José Luis Bernal
- Santi Prego

== Production ==
The screenplay was penned by Ángeles González Sinde alongside Manuel Gutiérrez Aragón. The film was produced by Tornasol Films, Continental Producciones and TVG with the participation of TVE, Canal+. It was shot in Valle del Pas, Cantabria.

== Release ==
Distributed by Alta Classics, Your Next Life opened in Spanish theatres on 30 January 2004. It also screened at the 54th Berlin International Film Festival's main competition on 9 February 2004.

== Reception ==
Jonathan Holland of Variety described the film as "an enjoyably intense rural murder drama-cum-romancer set in the remote Valle de Pas in northern Spain", being "superior anthropology and, for its first hour, superior cinema, too", with "first-class perfs, sore-eyes scenery and solid production values".

The review in Fotogramas highlighted the veracity of the film's characters and its actors, also assessing that whereas "Clara Lago confirms herself as an adult actress when she is still a child, Marta Etura is simply sensational".

== Accolades ==
Year	Award	Category	Nominee(s)	Result	Ref.
2005	3rd Mestre Mateo Awards	Best Film		Nominated	
2005	3rd Mestre Mateo Awards	Best Direction	Manuel Gutiérrez Aragón	Nominated	
2005	3rd Mestre Mateo Awards	Best Actor	Juan Diego	Nominated	
2005	3rd Mestre Mateo Awards	Best Actor	Luis Tosar	Nominated	
2005	3rd Mestre Mateo Awards	Best Actress	Marta Etura	Won	
2005	3rd Mestre Mateo Awards	Best Supporting Actor	Celso Bugallo	Nominated	
2005	3rd Mestre Mateo Awards	Best Screenplay	Ángeles González Sinde, Manuel Gutiérrez Aragón	Won	
2005	3rd Mestre Mateo Awards	Best Score	Xavier Capellas	Nominated	
2005	3rd Mestre Mateo Awards	Best Editing	José Salcedo	Nominated	
2005	3rd Mestre Mateo Awards	Best Art Direction	Félix Murcia	Nominated	
2005	18th European Film Awards	People's Choice Award for Best Actor	Luis Tosar	Nominated	

== See also ==
- List of Spanish films of 2004
