= 4º sen ascensor =

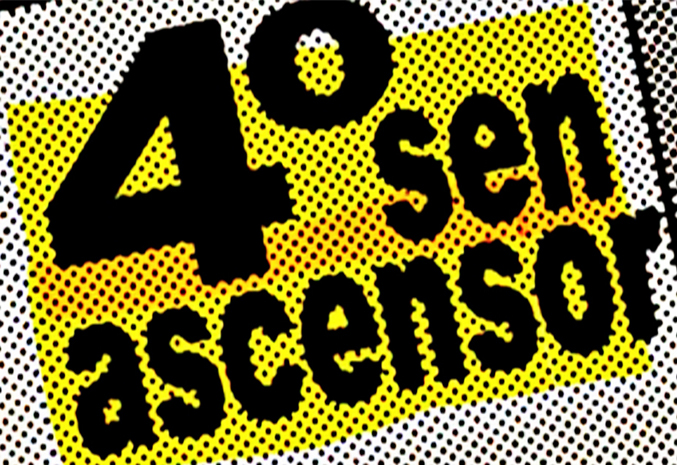
- Genre: Sitcom
- Created by: Beatriz del Monte
- Developed by: Filmanova
- Directed by: Beatriz del monte
- Starring: Xulio Abonjo; Cristina Castaño; Xosé Barato; Monica Camaño; Xoán Carlos Majuto
- Country of origin: Spain
- Original language: Galician
- No. of seasons: 1
- No. of episodes: 33

Production
- Running time: 60 minutes approx.

Original release
- Network: Televisión de Galicia
- Release: October 5, 2004 – May 24, 2005

4º sen ascensor (English: 4º without elevator) was a Spanish-Galician sitcom which aired on TVG between 2004 and 2005. It was created and directed by Beatriz del Monte and aired 33 episodes.

== Plot ==
Three students share a flat. Sebastian (or "Sebas"), a medical student, his cousin Lucy, a smart girl and good student and Fran, a parasite who exploits Sebastian continuously.

== Cast ==
- Xulio Abonjo (Sebas)
- Cristina Castaño (Lucía)
- Xosé Barato (Fran)
- Mónica Camaño (Ana)
- Xoán Carlos Mejuto (Diego)
- César Goldi (Raúl)
- Laura Ponte (Maruxa)
- Pepe Soto (Pedro)
- Julia Gómez
