= SMS: Sin Miedo a Soñar =

Spanish television series

- Genre: Teen drama
- Created by: Daniel Écija; Carmen Ortiz; Ernesto Pozuelo
- Starring: Mario Casas; Amaia Salamanca; Yon González; María Castro; Raúl Peña; Aroa Gimeno; Guillermo Barrientos
- Country of origin: Spain
- Original language: Spanish
- No. of seasons: 2
- No. of episodes: 185

Production
- Running time: 22 min (approx.)
- Production company: Globomedia

Original release
- Network: laSexta
- Release: 10 July 2006 – 30 March 2007

SMS: Sin Miedo a Soñar is a Spanish teen drama daily television series. Produced by Globomedia, it was the first Spanish television series aired on laSexta. It was broadcast from July 2006 to March 2007.

== Premise ==
The plot revolves around a group of well-off teenagers studying at the elitist Los Castaños school whose lives change after the arrival of the lower-class Edu, who after escaping from a youth remand centre, is being foster cared by Cristina, a lawyer.

== Cast ==
- Lola Marceli as Cristina.
- Javier Albalá as David.
- Raúl Peña as Edu Sánchez.
- Amaia Salamanca as Paula.
- Mario Casas as Javi Llorens.
- María Castro as Lucía.
- Aroa Gimeno as Sonia.
- Yon González as Andrés.
- Guillermo Barrientos as Paco.
- Antonio Hortelano as Juan.
- María León as Leti.
- Pablo Penedo as Sebas.
- Josep Linuesa as Gonzalo.
- Virginia Rodríguez as Luisa.
- Marta Hazas as Vicky.
- Martiño Rivas as Moisés.
- Sergio Mur.
- María Cotiello as Eva.
- Jesús Ruyman as Pepe.
- Alejandra Torray as Julia.

== Production and release ==
Aiming to attract a young audience to the newly born laSexta, it was the first Spanish series aired on the channel. SMS was also presented as the "first daily television series aired in prime time" in Spanish television. Created by Daniel Écija, Carmen Ortiz and Ernesto Pozuelo, the series was produced by Globomedia. Luis San Narciso worked as casting director. It premiered on 10 July 2006. It comprised 2 seasons featuring 185 episodes with a running time of around 22 minutes. The second season began airing on 1 January 2007. The broadcasting run ended on 30 March 2007. The series proved to be a cradle for highly coveted actors in Spanish television.

Series	Episodes	Originally released		
Series	Episodes	First released	Last released	Network
1	120	10 July 2006	29 December 2006	laSexta
2	65	1 January 2007	30 March 2007	laSexta
