= Alfonso Zarauza =

Spanish film director and screenwriter (born 1973)

- Born: Alfonso Vilas Zarauza; 1973 (age 52–53); Santiago de Compostela
- Years active: 1994—present

Alfonso Vilas Zarauza is a film director and screenwriter from Spain. Born in 1973 in Santiago de Compostela, he studied film at HIA in La Coruna.

He is an author of several shorts such as Hai que foderse (1994), ¡Aproba! (1995), A danza de Katiuska (1998), Sebastian (2001), and Touro (2002).

In 2008, he was awarded at the Viña del Mar International Film Festival. In 2009, he directed the TV series O Nordés.

His feature films include Spleen (La noche que dejó de llover, 2008) and Aces (2014). Aces was critically acclaimed.

Zarauza's next film, a comedy Encallados, was shot on 16mm black and white film. The movie was released in 2013 and was awarded as the Best Film at the 2d Premios Mestre Mateo.

In 2019, he produced Jaione Camborda's Arima.

In 2020, he released Ons, a complex and intimate drama, placed in a unique geographical setting. The movie was produced by Galician firm Maruxiña Film Company and Portuguese outfit Bando à Parte. Ons was screened at the 17th Seville European Film Festival.
