= Collision Course (2026 film) =

- Spanish: Colisión
- Directed by: Daniel Sánchez Arévalo
- Screenplay by: Daniel Sánchez Arévalo; Ramón Campos
- Starring: Laia Costa; Karra Elejalde; Luis Zahera; Tamar Novas; Álvaro Cervantes; Lluís Homar
- Music by: Federico Jusid; Lorenzo Perelmuter
- Production company: Bambú Producciones
- Distributed by: Netflix
- Release date: 30 October 2026
- Country: Spain
- Language: Spanish

Collision Course (Spanish: Colisión) is a 2026 Spanish heist thriller film directed by Daniel Sánchez Arévalo. It stars Laia Costa, Karra Elejalde, Luis Zahera, Tamar Novas, Álvaro Cervantes, and Lluís Homar.

== Plot ==
Set in 2013, the plot follows the developments after a group of robbers break into a bank in Madrid.

== Cast ==
- Laia Costa as Carla Mencía
- Karra Elejalde as Pedro
- Luis Zahera as Ernesto
- Tamar Novas as Tomás
- Álvaro Cervantes as Raúl
- Lluís Homar as Luis

== Production ==
The film is a Bambú Producciones production for Netflix, with co-writer Ramón Campos serving as executive producer. It entered production without a working title, and was later marketed under the title Cruzados. It was shot on location in and around Madrid.

== Release ==
Distributed by Netflix, it was released on 30 October 2026.

== Reception ==
Raquel Hernández Luján of HobbyConsolas gave the film an 83-point score, commending it as "a clever, well-structured and thoroughly entertaining thriller".

Javier Ocaña of El País assessed that Sánchez Arévalo "skilfully steers his narrative device right up to an admittedly rather unconvincing denouement", also pointing out that the film is excessively indebted to Run Lola Run and Before the Devil Knows You're Dead.

== See also ==
- List of Spanish films of 2026
