= Amador (film) =

- Directed by: Fernando León de Aranoa
- Written by: Fernando León de Aranoa
- Starring: Magaly Solier; Celso Bugallo; Pietro Sibille; Sonia Almarcha; Fanny de Castro
- Cinematography: Ramiro Civita
- Edited by: Nacho Ruiz Capillas
- Music by: Lucio Godoy
- Production companies: Reposado PC; Mediapro
- Distributed by: Alta Films
- Release date: 8 October 2010
- Running time: 112 minutes
- Country: Spain
- Language: Spanish
- Box office: 481.100 euros

Amador is a 2010 Spanish drama film directed and written by Fernando León de Aranoa and starring Magaly Solier and Celso Bugallo. The two actors were nominated for Best Actress and Best Supporting Actor, respectively, at the 2011 CEC Awards.

== Plot ==
Marcela, a Bolivian immigrant woman struggling to survive in Madrid with her companion Nelson. They revive discarded flowers and Nelson has teams sell them on the streets. When their refrigerator breaks down, they are desperate.

She takes a job as the daytime caregiver of Amador, an old man who is largely bedridden. Day by day, Marcela earns money that she desperately needs while Amador enjoys her company. His daughter and her family hardly see him.

Through this, Amador and Marcela develop a special connection, while he feels his time is short. It is cut when Amador dies. Marcela, desperate to keep her job, confronts a difficult moral dilemma.

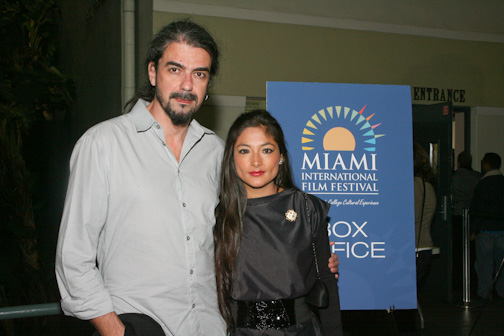
Director Fernando León de Aranoa and actor Magaly Solier at the 2011 Miami International Film Festival screening of Amador

== Cast ==
- Magaly Solier as Marcela
- Celso Bugallo as Amador
- Pietro Sibille as Nelson
- Sonia Almarcha as Yolanda
- Fanny de Castro as Puri
- Antonio Durán
- Eleazar Ortiz
- Raquel Pérez
- Manolo Solo
- Mayra Terry

== Production ==
Amador is a Reposado and Mediapro production. Shooting locations included Madrid and Barcelona.

== Release ==
Distributed by Alta Films, it was theatrically released in Spain on 8 October 2010.

== Reception ==
Mirito Torreiro of Fotogramas rated the film with 4 out of 5 stars, noting Solier's performance as the best thing about the film.

Reviewing for Cinemanía, Carlos Marañón gave it 3½ out of 5 stars, saying that Amador "is not going to be his most complete film, nor the most groundbreaking, nor even the most remembered, but this is surely Fernando León's most optimistic film".

Javier Ocaña of El País said that Fernando León repeated some of his shortcomings of Princesses in Amador, even losing the comedy touch he had in Barrio and Mondays in the Sun.

American critic Roger Ebert liked the concept and praised Solier's performance but suggested that the role was too passive. He gave the film 2 out of 4 stars.

== Accolades ==
Year	Award	Category	Nominee(s)	Result	Ref.
2011	66th CEC Medals	Best Actress	Magaly Solier	Nominated	
2011	66th CEC Medals	Best Supporting Actor	Celso Bugallo	Nominated	
2011	20th Actors and Actresses Union Awards	Best Film Actress in a Secondary Role	Fanny de Castro	Nominated	
