= Dhogs =

- Directed by: Andrés Goteira
- Screenplay by: Andrés Goteira
- Produced by: Suso López
- Starring: Melania Cruz; Antonio Durán "Morris"; Miguel de Lira; Carlos Blanco Vila; Iván Marcos; María Costas
- Cinematography: Lucía Catoira Pan
- Edited by: Juan Galiñanes; Andrés Goteira
- Music by: Óscar Trigo; Germán Díaz
- Production companies: Gaitafilmes; Pixelfilms
- Release date: 2017
- Running time: 85 minutes
- Country: Spain
- Language: Galician
- Budget: 120,000 €

Dhogs is an independent Galician film in the Galician language directed by Andrés Goteira (Meira, 1983), which was released in 2017. This was the director's debut film, and starred Carlos Blanco Vila, Antonio Durán "Morris", Miguel de Lira, Melania Cruz, Iván Marcos and María Costas. It premiered at the Buenos Aires International Festival of Independent Cinema (BAFICI) on April 19, 2017, and was nominated for the Best Feature Film in the Avant-Garde and Genre section. This is the first film shot in Galicia to premiere at the Sitges Film Festival, on October 9, 2017. In Galicia, the premiere took place at the Ourense International Film Festival on October 21, 2017.

== Plot ==
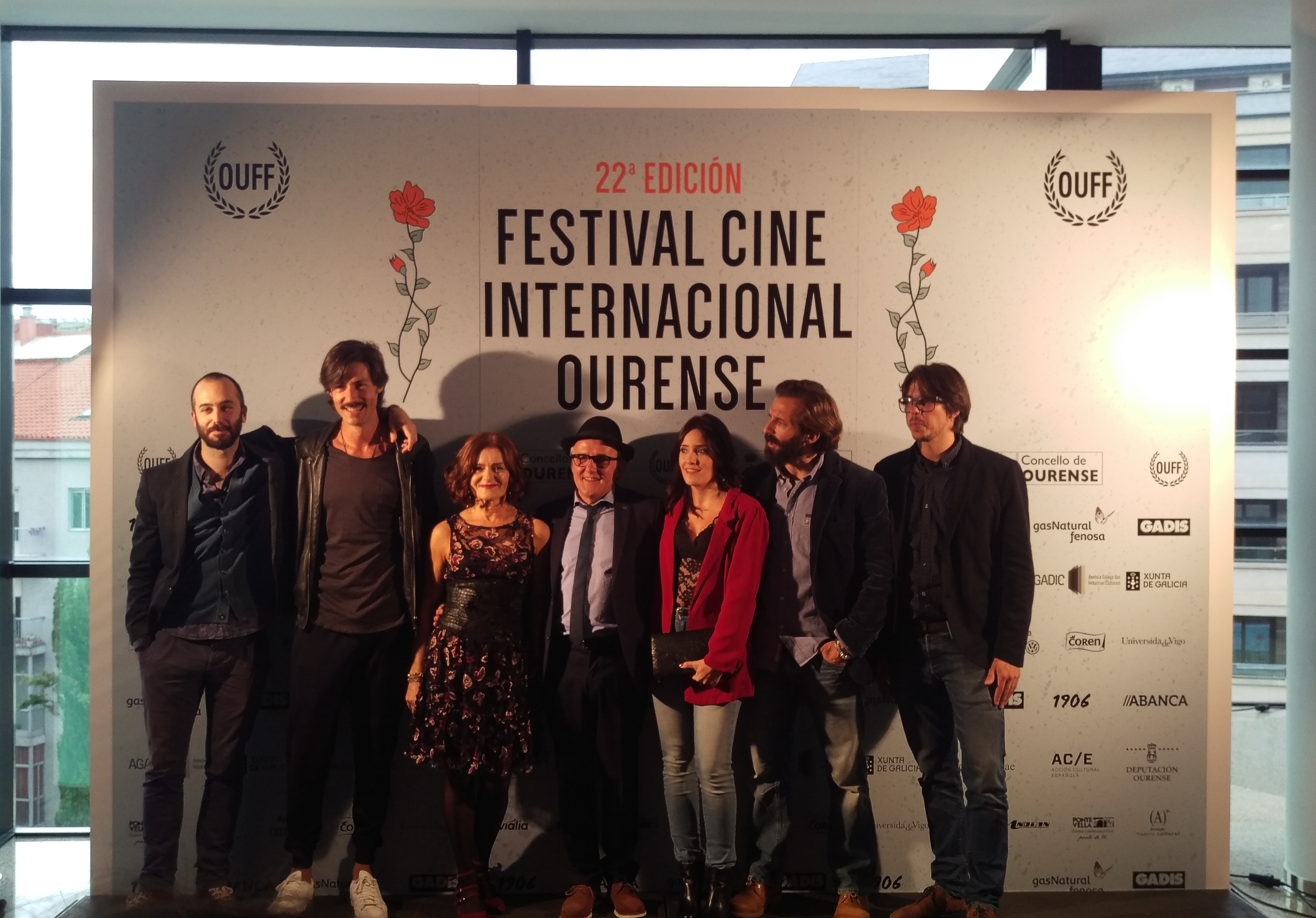
The cast of Dhogs along with Andrés Goteira at the premier of the film at Ourense International Film Festival.

The film connects 6 parallel stories that revolve around different characters: a beautiful woman, a man with a dark life, a taxi driver and an old ex-military man.

== Production ==
The film was funded by AGADIC and the Provincial Council of Lugo, but also a part of the budget of the film was obtained through the Verkami platform, with more than 400 patrons. The film was shot in several locations in Galicia, such as Viveiro, As Pontes de García Rodríguez, Oleiros and A Coruña, as well as in the desert of Tabernas, in Almería.

== Awards and nominations ==
Dhogs won thirteen awards at the Mestre Mateo Awards 2017, including best film, best director, best screenplay, best actor, best actress, best supporting actor and best supporting actress, becoming the most awarded film in the history of the awards. It was nominated for 17 awards in 14 categories.

Category	Person	Result
Best Picture		Won
Best Director	Andrés Goteira	Won
Best Actor	Iván Marcos	Won
Best Actress	Melania Cruz	Won
Best Supporting Actor	Antonio Durán "Morris"	Won
Best Supporting Actor	Carlos Blanco Vila	Nominated
Best Supporting Actor	Miguel de Lira	Nominated
Best Supporting Actress	María Costas	Won
Best Screenplay	Andrés Goteira	Won
Best Production Manager	Suso López	Won
Best Art Director	Noelia Vilaboa	Won
Best Editing	Andrés Goteira and Juan Galiñanes	Won
Best Original Music	Germán Díaz	Won
Best Sound Production	David Machado and Javier Pato	Wones
Best Cinematography	Lucía Catoira Pan	Won
Best Makeup and Hair	Ana Coya	Nominated
Best Costume	María Porto	Nominated
