= Celso Bugallo =

Spanish actor (1947–2025)

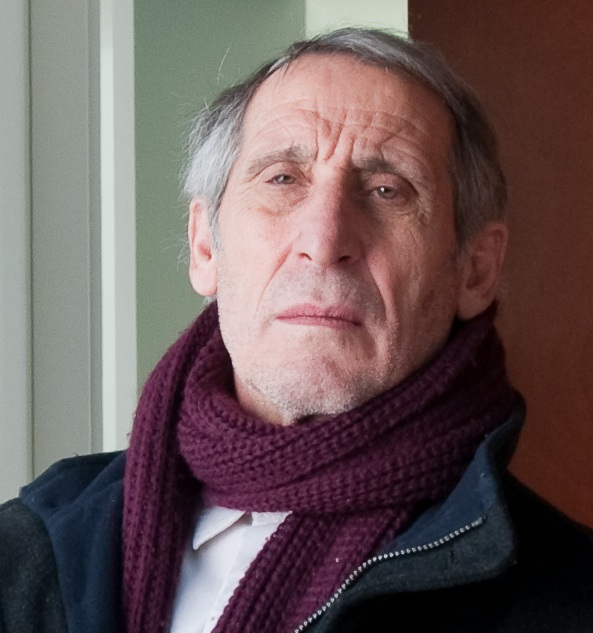
- Bugallo in 2010
- Born: Celso Bugallo Aguiar; 1 January 1947; Sanxenxo, Spain
- Died: 20 December 2025 (aged 78); Pontevedra, Spain
- Occupation: Actor

Celso Bugallo Aguiar (1 January 1947 – 20 December 2025) was a Spanish actor from Galicia. Recognized as a supporting actor, he featured in films such as Mondays in the Sun, The Sea Inside (for which he won the Goya Award for Best Supporting Actor), The Night of the Sunflowers, and The Good Boss.

== Life and career ==
Bugallo was born on 1 January 1947 in Vilalonga, Sanxenxo, where he was raised until he was 10. Upon the liberation of his father from the Francoist regime in the 1950s, he moved with his family to Bilbao, and then to Logroño. In Logroño, he began to develop an acting career on stage. He returned to his native Galicia in 1978.

In 1999, he made his big screen debut at age 52 in Butterfly's Tongue, playing a priest in the time of the Second Spanish Republic. Demonstrating a knack for "dry and bitter" characters, Bugallo continued his film career with supporting roles in titles such as Lena (2001), Mondays in the Sun (2002), The Carpenter's Pencil (2003), and Your Next Life (2004). In Mondays in the Sun, he played an alcoholic former shipbuilding worker suffering from social isolation, winning a Mestre Mateo award for Best Supporting Actor for his performance.

He won the Goya Award for Best Supporting Actor for his portrayal of José Sampedro (Ramón Sampedro's brother) in The Sea Inside (2004). He played a Guardia Civil corporal in The Night of the Sunflowers (2006). He also appeared as the father of Salvador Puig Antich in Salvador (2006). In Wrap Up, he featured as a Galician immigrant to Argentina coming back home.

Bugallo landed leading roles in Cenizas del cielo (2008) and Amador (2010). In the former, he starred as a villager in a struggle against a thermal power station polluting a valley, inhabiting a character "full of life, energy, and purpose". In the latter, he played an old man taken care of by an immigrant woman.

His film career also included performances in 53 Days of Winter (2006), Modesty (2007), Guts (2009), Palm Trees in the Snow (2015), and The Art of Return (2020). For his small role as a loyal employee in the social satire The Good Boss (2021), he earned a nomination for a Goya Award for Best Supporting Actor.

Bugallo died in Pontevedra on 20 December 2025 at the age of 78.

== Selected filmography ==
Year	Title	Role	Notes	Ref.
1999	La lengua de las mariposas (Butterfly's Tongue)	Cura ('priest')	Feature film debut	
2002	Los lunes al sol (Mondays in the Sun)	Amador		
2004	La vida que te espera (Your Next Life)	Severo		
2004	Mar adentro (The Sea Inside)	José Sampedro		
2006	Salvador	Pare de Puig Antich ('Puig Antich's father')		
2006	La noche de los girasoles (The Night of the Sunflowers)	Amadeo		
2007	Abrígate (Wrap Up)	Coco		
2007	Sultanes del sur (Sultans of the South)	El Tejano		
2008	Cenizas del cielo	Federico		
2009	La isla interior (The Island Inside)	Juan		
2009	Agallas (Guts)	Raúl		
2010	Amador	Amador		
2015	La playa de los ahogados (Death of a Fisherman)	Padre de Caldas ('Caldas' father')		
2015	Palmeras en la nieve (Palm Trees in the Snow)	Kilian mayor ('old Kilian')		
2020	El practicante (The Paramedic)	Vicente		
2020	La isla de las mentiras (The Island of Lies)	Paco		
2020	El arte de volver (The Art of Return)	Marcos		
2021	El buen patrón (The Good Boss)	Fortuna		
2023	Loli Tormenta (Stormy Lola)	Tomás		
2024	Estación Rocafort (Last Stop: Rocafort St.)	Elías		

== Accolades ==
Year	Award	Category	Work	Result	Ref.
2005	19th Goya Awards	Best Supporting Actor	The Sea Inside	Won	
2005	14th Actors and Actresses Union Awards	Best Film Actor in a Secondary Role	The Sea Inside	Won	
2022	9th Feroz Awards	Best Supporting Actor in a Film	The Good Boss	Nominated	
2022	36th Goya Awards	Best Supporting Actor	The Good Boss	Nominated	
