= Roberto Vilar =

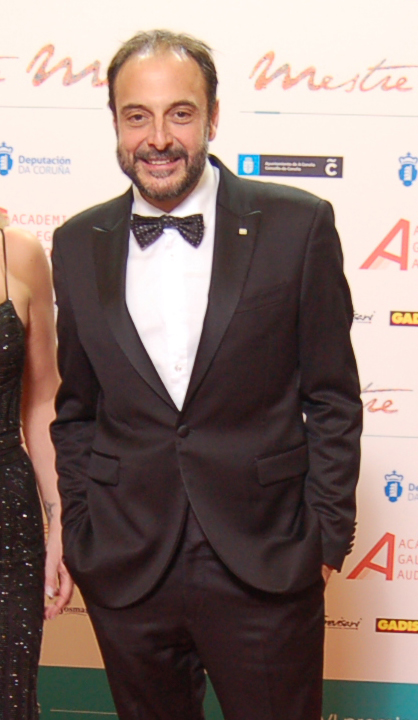
- Vilar in 2017.
- Born: Roberto Vilar Fernández; 1971 (age 54–55); Xove, Galicia, Spain
- Notable work: Os Tonechos; Land Rober (host, 2009–present); Salta a la vista (host, 2011–present)

Comedy career
- Years active: 2000–present
- Medium: Television

Roberto Vilar Fernández (born 1971) is a Galician comedian, television presenter and actor.

Vilar started his television career as part of the comedy duo of Os Tonechos, a sketch show on the late-night variety show Luar. The success of the segment led to his own late-night sketch and variety show Land Rober.

In 2011 Vilar made the move from the regional television network, CRTVG, to a national one, when he was offered a contract by Mediaset España to host the game show Salta a la vista on Cuatro.

In 2014, Vilar hosted the twelfth annual Mestre Mateo Awards.
