= Juan Carlos Vellido =

Spanish actor

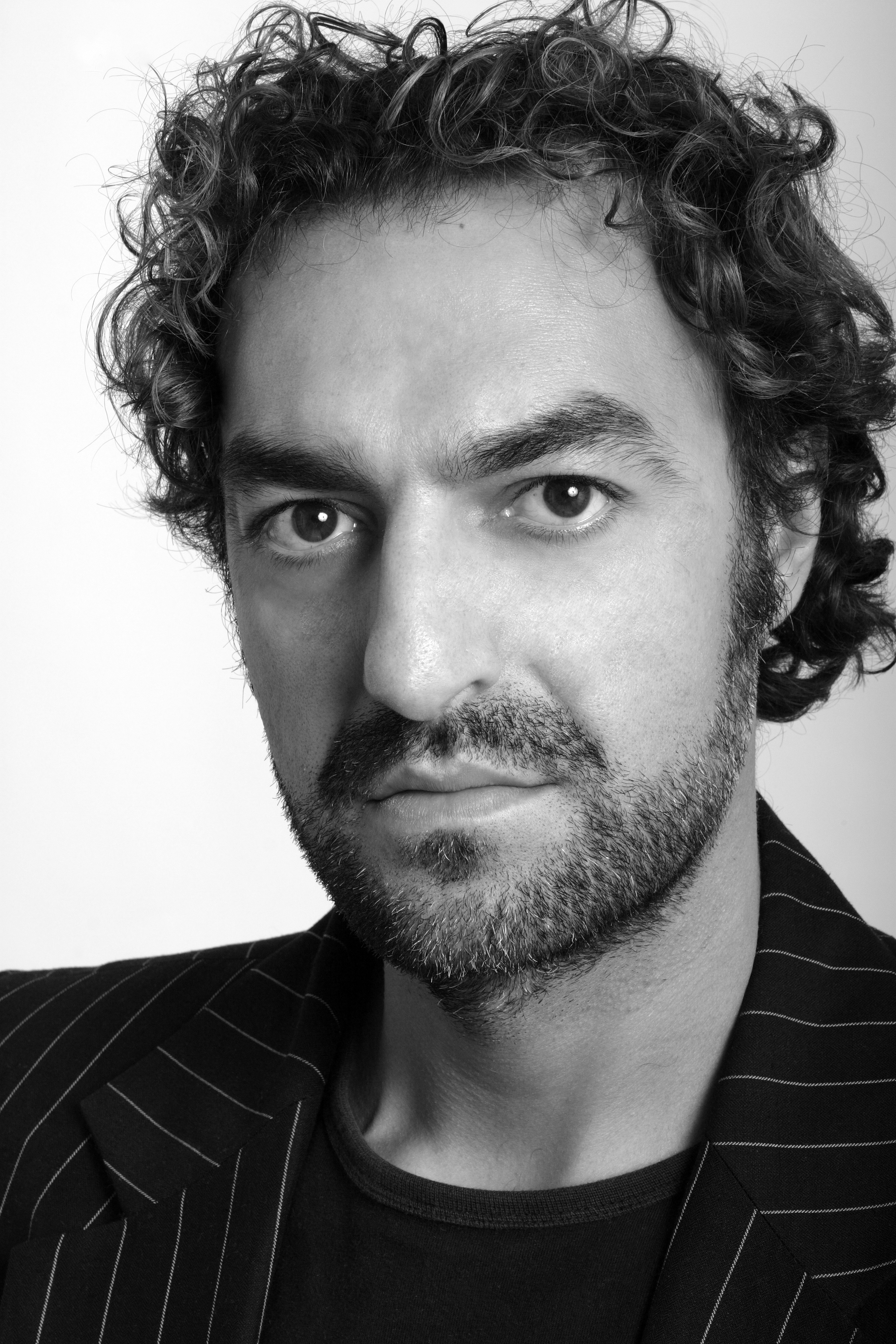
- Vellido in 2007
- Born: March 18, 1968 (age 58); Barcelona, Spain
- Occupation: Actor
- Years active: 1995–present

Juan Carlos Vellido (born March 18, 1968) is a Spanish actor.

Vellido was born in Barcelona, Spain. His career is divided between cinema, theater and television. Among his most recent film appearances were as the protagonist of (No somos nadie) and has worked with directors like Guillermo del Toro (El espinazo del diablo), María Ripoll (Utopía) and Manuel Huerga (Salvador).

Vellido has also published two literary works: Escorzos and El hombre que vivía en una pecera both published by Ediciones Martínez Roca.

Vellido appeared in Pirates of the Caribbean: On Stranger Tides, along with three other fellow Spanish actors Astrid Berges-Frisbey, Óscar Jaenada and Penélope Cruz.

== Filmography ==
| Year | Title | Role | Notes |
|---|---|---|---|
| 1995 | Boca a boca | | |
| 1996 | Alma gitana | | |
| 1996 | Malena es un nombre de tango | Nacho | |
| 1997 | ¿De qué se ríen las mujeres? | | |
| 1998 | Los años bárbaros | Jorge Negrete | |
| 1998 | The Flying Liftboy | Guerrila | |
| 1999 | Los lobos de Washington | Hombre bala | |
| 2001 | 3 noches | Picasso | |
| 2001 | The Devil's Backbone | actor | |
| 2001 | I Love You Baby | | Uncredited |
| 2002 | The Dancer Upstairs | Soldier 1 in Rejas' Office | |
| 2002 | No somos nadie | Angel | |
| 2002 | Bestiario | Baltasar | |
| 2003 | Utopía | Ramiro | |
| 2004 | What Sebastian Dreamt | Actor | |
| 2006 | Salvador | Policia BPS (3) | |
| 2007 | Cinemart | Transvestido | |
| 2008 | Che | Major Hernán Plata | |
| 2008 | Sexykiller, morirás por ella | Professor Anatomía | |
| 2009 | Expulsados 1609, la tragedia de los moriscos | Pícaro | |
| 2009 | Malamuerte | Juan | |
| 2010 | 18 comidas | Juan | |
| 2010 | Neon Flesh | The director | |
| 2011 | Pirates of the Caribbean: On Stranger Tides | Spanish Captain | |
| 2012 | Twice Born | Official Ministry | |
| 2013 | Scorpion in Love | Francisco | |
| 2013 | Mario Conde. Los días de gloria | Arturo Romaní | TV Miniseries |
| 2013 | Pixel Theory | Presidente Durán | (segment 'La ley Ariadne') |
| 2013 | Alpha | Tom | |
| 2014 | Os fenómenos | Furón | |
| 2014 | Crustáceos | | |
| 2017 | Pirates of the Caribbean: Dead Men Tell No Tales | Lieutenant Lesaro | |
| 2017 | El collar de sal | | |
| 2020 | Someone Has to Die | Santos Aldamo | 3 episodes |
