= Gangs of Galicia =

Spanish thriller television series

- Promotional release poster
- Spanish: Clanes
- Created by: Jorge Guerricaechevarría
- Written by: Jorge Guerricaechevarría
- Directed by: Roger Gual
- Starring: Clara Lago; Tamar Novas
- Country of origin: Spain
- Original language: Spanish
- No. of seasons: 2
- No. of episodes: 13

Production
- Production company: Vaca Films

Original release
- Network: Netflix
- Release: 21 June 2024 – present

Gangs of Galicia (Spanish: Clanes) is a Spanish thriller television series created and written by Jorge Guerricaechevarría and directed by Roger Gual. It stars Clara Lago and Tamar Novas. In January 2025, the series was renewed for a season 2.

== Plot ==
The plot follows the relationship between Ana González, a lawyer from Madrid who recently settled in Cambados, and Daniel Padín, son of imprisoned drug kingpin José Padín.

== Cast ==
- Clara Lago as Ana González Soriano
- Tamar Novas as Daniel Padín
- Xosé Antonio Touriñán as Nilo
- Melania Cruz as Laura Silva Figaredo
- Francesc Garrido as Naranjo
- Miguel de Lira as José Padín
- Nuno Gallego as Marco
- Tomás del Estal as Nazario
- Diego Anido as Samuel
- Chechu Salgado as Toño
- María Pujalte as Berta
- Julius Cotter as Sandro

== Production ==
Gangs of Galicia was produced by Vaca Films. Shooting locations in Galicia included Vilanova, Ares, Vilagarcía, A Illa, and Sanxenxo, while footage was also shot in Málaga, Betanzos, Gibraltar, Algeciras, Madrid, Porto, and Senegal.

== Release ==
The series was released on Netflix on 21 June 2024.

== Reception ==
Joel Keller of Decider.com gave the series a positive recommendation, hoping that it "concentrates on the aspect of its story that's the most interesting, which is Ana and Daniel".

Peter Martin of ScreenAnarchy wrote that "the show is combustible and propulsive, right through to the end".

== See also ==
- 2024 in Spanish television
