= Cristina Castaño =

Spanish actress (born 1978)

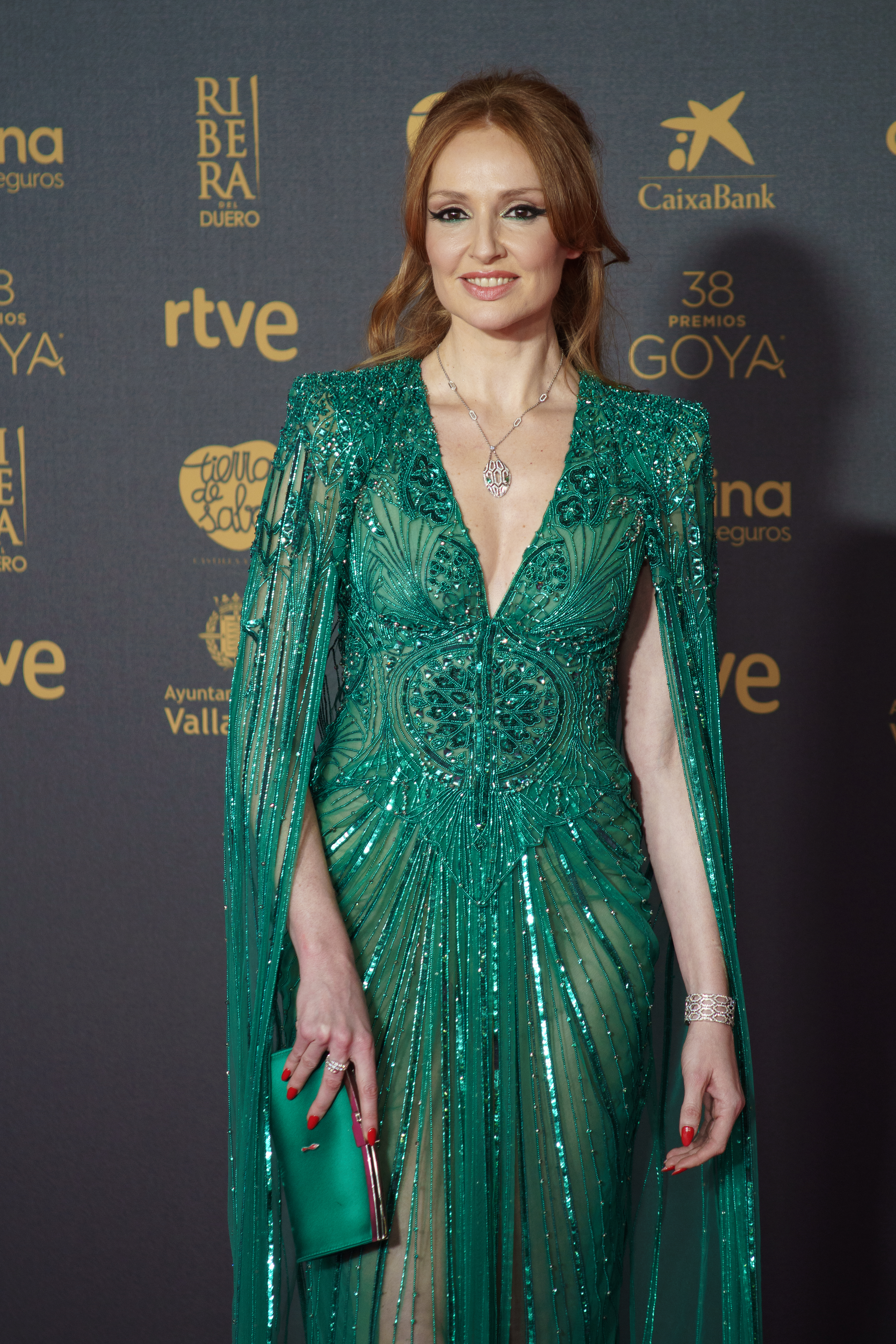
- Castaño in 2024
- Born: Cristina Castaño Gómez; October 30, 1978 (age 48); Vilalba, Spain
- Occupation: Actress
- Relatives: Pepe Domingo Castaño (uncle)

Cristina Castaño Gómez (born 30 October 1978) is a Spanish actress best known for her role as Judith Becker in the hit series La que se avecina.

== Biography ==
Cristina Castaño Gómez was born on 30 October 1978 in Vilalba, province of Lugo.

Early film work include performances in Divine Words, XXL, and Días azules.

She made a name for herself in Galicia thanks to her role as Paula Barreiro in the series Pratos combinados, aired on the Galician regional broadcaster Televisión de Galicia (TVG).

In 2000 she got the opportunity to join the cast of another series, this time a nationwide one called Al salir de clase (leaving class). It was a role for the summer, but she remained there until the end of the series, in 2002. Thus, she left Pratos combinados, leaving her character to be played by María Castro, an actress with whom she would co-star with later in the film Días azules (Blue Days), and she became one of the most promising young actresses on Telecinco's series.

In 1999 she worked alongside Concha Velasco in the theatre play Las manzanas del viernes (The Apples of Friday).

She has since made cameos in some national series and has had small roles in films as well as theater projects, and has even tried her hand in the world of singing, participating in a live concert with Carlos Núñez and being the representative of Spain at the Viña del Mar International Song Festival in 2001 with Elvira Prado.

In 2005 she returned to TVG in another series, 4º sen ascensor (in Galician, Fourth [floor] Without Elevator).

From 2006 she worked in the musical Fame, with over 600 performances throughout Spain, and combined that with her work in Herederos. Also in 2006, she appeared in the feel-good film Días azules.

She was a cast member in the Telecinco series La que se avecina as Judith Becker, a psychologist who gives therapy to all the neighbours in her block of flats, Mirador de Montepinar. She appeared from the 3rd season until the 9th, leaving the series in 2016.

She is the niece of radio announcer Pepe Domingo Castaño.

== Filmography ==
=== Television ===
Year	Title	Role	Channel	Notes
1999	Compañeros	Extra	Antena 3	Episode "Cosa del demonio feo"
2000 – 2001	Pratos combinados	Paula Barreiro	TVG	26 episodes
2000 – 2002	Al salir de clase	Lydia Celada	Telecinco	442 episodes
2002	El comisario	Alexia	Telecinco	
2005	7 vidas	Nuria	Telecinco	Episode "La boda de mi peor amiga"
2005	Hospital Central	Susana	Telecinco	Episode "Retrato de boda"
2005	4º sen ascensor	Lucía Lestón	TVG	33 episodes
2006	Con dos tacones		La 1	3 episodes
2006	Hospital Central	Virginia	Telecinco	Episode "Cada final es un comienzo"
2007 – 2008	Herederos	Rocío Urquijo	La 1	13 episodes
2008 – 2009	El comisario	Sara Ruiz	Telecinco	9 episodes
2009 – 2016	La que se avecina	Judith Bécker	Telecinco	90 episodes
2013	Frágiles	Miriam	Telecinco	Episode "El hombre irrompible"
2017	El final del camino	Constance of Burgundy	La 1	6 episodes
2018	Cuerpo de élite	Elena Rodríguez Neira	Antena 3	13 episodes
2019 – 2021	Toy Boy	Macarena Medina de Solís	Antena 3 / Atresplayer	21 episodes
2021	The Mallorca Files	Domenica Castaña	BBC One	Episode "The Maestro"
2024	Na Gloria	Pati	TVG	16 episodes
2024	Rapa	Inma Támoga	Movistar Plus+	6 episodes
2025	Lume	Lucía Salceda Pereira	TVG / RTP / HBO Max	6 episodes
2025	Nails	Lina Hidalgo Matilla	SkyShowtime	8 episodes
2026	Tu cara me suena	Herself	Antena 3	Contestant

=== Film ===
Year	Title	Role	Notes	Ref.
1987	Divinas palabras (Divine Words)			
2004	XXL			
2006	Días azules			
2016	Nacida para ganar	María Dolores		
2018	Sin rodeos (Empowered)	Vanessa		
2019	Bajo el mismo techo (Under the Same Roof)	Arancha		
2019	Lo dejo cuando quiera (I Can Quit Whenever I Want)	Isa		
2023	13 exorcismos (13 Exorcisms)	Asunción		
