= Eduardo Blanco Amor =

Galician writer and journalist

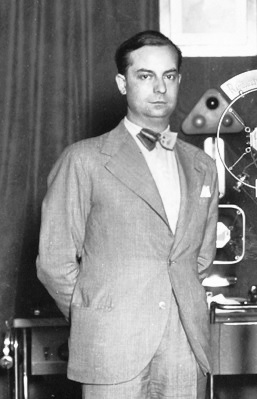
Eduardo Blanco Amor.

Eduardo Modesto Blanco Amor (September 14, 1897 in Ourense – December 1, 1979 in Vigo) was a Galician writer and journalist who wrote in Galician and in Spanish.

== Works in Galician ==
- Os Nonnatos (1927)
- Romances galegos (1928)
- Poema en catro tempos (1931)
- A escadeira de Jacob
- Cancioneiro (1956)
- A esmorga (1959).
- Os biosbardos (1962)
- Xente ao lonxe (1972).
- Farsas para títeres (1973)
- Teatro pra xente (1974)
- Poemas galegos (1980)
- Proceso en Jacobusland (Fantasía xudicial en ningures) (1980)
- Castelao escritor (1986)
- A Contrapelo (1993)

== Works in Spanish ==
- Horizonte evadido (1936)
- En soledad amena (1941)
- La catedral y el niño (1948)
- Chile a la vista (1950)
- Las buenas maneras (1963)
- Los miedos (1963)

== Sources ==
- Allegue, G. (1993). Eduardo Blanco Amor. Diante dun xuíz ausente. Vigo: Nigra. ISBN 84-87709-05-2.
- Álvarez, V. (2004). "Manuel Azaña e Eduardo Blanco Amor. Epistolario inédito (1935-1944)". Grial (163): 57–73. ISSN 0017-4181.
- Carballo Calero, R. (1975) [1963]. Historia da literatura galega contemporánea. Galaxia. pp. 715–719. ISBN 84-7154-227-7.
- Casares, Carlos (Xullo-Setembro, 1973). "Leria con Eduardo Blanco-Amor". Grial (41): 337-344. ISSN 0017-4181.
- Carro, Xavier (1993). A obra literaria de Eduardo Blanco Amor. Vigo: Galaxia. ISBN 84-7154-868-2.
- Couceiro Freijomil, A. (1951–53). Diccionario bio-bibliográfico de escritores I. Bibliófilos Gallegos. p. 153-154.
- Fernández, Camilo (1995). Eduardo Blanco Amor e o teatro. Universitat de Barcelona. ISBN 84-475-1060-3.
- Fernández del Riego, Francisco (1971) [1951]. Historia da literatura galega (2ª ed.). Galaxia. pp. 203–204 e 249–250.
- —————— (1992) [1990]. Diccionario de escritores en lingua galega (2ª ed.). Do Castro. pp. 50–51. ISBN 84-7492-465-0.
- Forcadela, Manuel (1991). Guía de lectura de “A esmorga”. Edicións do Cumio. ISBN 84-87126-44-8.
- Freixanes, V. (976). "Eduardo Blanco Amor diante do espello". Unha ducia de galegos. Galaxia. pp. 79–101. ISBN 84-7154-248-X.
- Gómez, A.; Queixas, M. (2001). Historia xeral da literatura galega (1ª ed.). A Nosa Terra. pp. 292–298. ISBN 84-95350-79-3.
- Landeira Yrago, José (1986). Federico García Lorca y Galicia. Ediciós do Castro. ISBN 84-7492-306-9.
- Lorenzana, S. (Xaneiro-Marzo, 1980). "Perfil biobibliográfico de Eduardo Blanco Amor". Grial (67): 37-45. ISSN 0017-4181.
- Méndez Ferrín, Xosé Luis (1984). De Pondal a Novoneyra. Edicións Xerais de Galicia. p. 57. ISBN 84-7507-139-2.
- Pena, X. R. (2019). Historia da literatura galega. IV. De 1936 a 1975. A «longa noite». Xerais. pp. 404–441. ISBN 978-84-9121-481-6.
- Vilavedra, Dolores, ed. (1995). Diccionario da literatura galega. Autores I. Vigo: Galaxia. pp. 79–82. ISBN 84-8288-019-5.
- Poema actual a Blanco Amor (Extra). A Nosa Terra III. 1985.
- E. Blanco Amor (1897-1979). Xunta de Galicia. 1993.
- "Blanco Amor, Eduardo Modesto". Diccionario enciclopédico galego universal 9. La Voz de Galicia. 2003-2004. p. 93. ISBN 84-7680-429-6.
- "Blanco Amor, Eduardo Modesto". Dicionario biográfico de Galicia 1. Ir Indo. 2010-2011. p. 111-116.
- "Blanco Amor, Eduardo Modesto". Diciopedia do século 21 1. Do Cumio, Galaxia e do Castro. 2006. p. 324. ISBN 978-84-8288-942-9.
- "Blanco Amor, Eduardo Modesto". Enciclopedia Galega Universal 3. Ir Indo. 1999-2002. pp. 368–370. ISBN 84-7680-288-9.
- "Blanco Amor, Eduardo". Gran Enciclopedia Galega Silverio Cañada (DVD). El Progreso. 2005. ISBN 84-87804-88-8.
- "Eduardo Blanco Amor". Enciclopedia Microsoft Encarta (DVD). Microsoft Corporation. 2009.
