= El rey, Vicente Fernández =

- Genre: Biographical; Musical; Drama
- Created by: Dago García; Jhonny Alexander Ortiz
- Written by: Jhonny Alexander Ortiz; Daniela Richer; Luis Guerrero; Rodrigo Ordóñez
- Directed by: Fernando Urdapilleta; Conrado Martínez; Andrés Lizarazo
- Starring: Jaime Camil
- Theme music composer: José Alfredo Jiménez
- Opening theme: "El Rey" by Jaime Camil
- Composers: Lynn Faintchtein; Camilo Froideval; Dan Zlotnik
- Country of origin: Colombia
- Original language: Spanish
- No. of seasons: 1
- No. of episodes: 32

Production
- Executive producers: Harold Sánchez; Gerardo Fernández Abarca; JM Shows; José Luis Parra Quintero; Dago Garcia; Amparo Gutiérrez; Lisette Osorio
- Editor: Juan Pablo Serna
- Production company: Caracol Televisión

Original release
- Network: Caracol TV
- Release: 3 August – 16 September 2022

El Rey, Vicente Fernández is a Colombian biographical drama series produced by Caracol TV. The series aired first in Colombia on Caracol TV from 3 August 2022 to 16 September 2022. The series became available for streaming outside Colombia on Netflix on 14 September 2022. On Netflix, the series has a total of 36 episodes.

== Cast ==
- Jaime Camil as Vicente Fernández
  - Sebastian Dante as Young Vicente
  - Sebastian García as Teen Vicente
  - Kaled Acab as Child Vicente
- Marcela Guirado as María del Refugio "Cuquita"
  - Regina Pavón as Young Cuquita
  - Ishkra Zaval as Child Cuquita
- Enoc Leaño as Ramón
- Marissa Saavedra as Paula Gómez
- Raúl Sandoval as Felipe Arriaga
- Erick Chapa as Tico Mendoza
- Florencia Ríos as Refugios Fernández
  - Seidy Bercht as Teen Refugios
  - Casandra Iturralde as Child Refugios
- Ana Paula Capetillo as Teresa Fernández
  - Valentina Buzzurro as Teen Teresa
  - Camila Núñez as Child Teresa
- Camila Rojas as Janeth
- Rubén Zamora as Enrique Landes
- Gaby Espino as Verónica Landín
- Sara Montalvo as Matilde
- Nini Pavón as Doña Zuy
- Alexa Martín as Rosa
- Mauricio Pimentel as La Muerte
- Esteban Soberanes as Alberto Ríos

=== Guest stars ===
- Odiseo Bichir as Pastor Miguel
- Carlos Corona as Palermo El Gordo
- Roberto Tello as Don Pascual
- Yigael Yadin as El Chato
- Aroa Gimeno as Maritza
- Emilio Hernández as Chuy
- Valeria Santaella as Dolores
- Pilar Santacruz as Gloria
  - Karla Gaytán as Child Gloria
- Juan Pablo Hermidia as Gustavo
- Juan Morales as Porfirio
- Checo Perezcuadra as Raúl Abarca
- Waldo Facco as Duran
- Jerónimo Victoria as Palafox El Malandrín
- Angelo Enciso as Marcelo
- Elissa Garibay as Socorro
- Rodrigo Magaña as David
- Fabián Pazzo as Acosta
- Alejandro Morales as Ismael
- Fernando Sansores as Dr. Camacho
- Salvador Álvarez as Humberto
- Javier de la Vega as Israel Camacho
- Carlos Fonseca as Mario Cervera
- Victor Civeira as Pastor Benavides
- Lucia Tinajero as Emilia
- David Muri as Genaro Rey
- Alejandro Cuétara as Hinestroza
- Beto Ruelas as Antonio Vargas
- Pablo García as Oscar
- Jaime Vega as Reutilio
- Argenis Aldrete as Dr. Ramírez
- Acoyani Chacón as Juan La Bestia
- Andrea Paz as Pachita
- Benjamín Martínez as Plinio
- Sofía Garza as Lorena Cruz
- Ernesto Alvares as Antua Lazo
- Giovanni Carlo as Ángel Encargado
- Alieth Vargas as Mari
- Juanita Londoño as Alejandra
- Christian de Dios as Guillermo
- Gabo Anguiano as Simón
- Rodrigo Olguin as Tulio
- Santiago Rojas as Martín
- Alfredo Herrera as Joan El Felino
- Gregorio Urkijo as young Junior
  - Ruy Gaytán as child Junior
- Walter Kapellas as Nemesio
- Sergio Gutiérrez as Tiberio
- Adriana Llabrés as Graciela
- Antonio Zúñiga as Tomás
- Alejandro Bracho as Eustaquio
- Armando Tapia as Hilario
- Sofía Blanchet as Abigail
- Geraldine Galván as Elsa
- Enrique Chi as Emeterio
- Ezequiel Cardenas as Javier
- Luis Curiel as Jimeno
- Karla Esquivel as Patricia Sáenz
- Luisa Galindo as Raquel
- Fernando Becerril as Honorio Dalton
- Javier Gómez as Roberto
- Marcial Casale as Don Yuyo
- América Valdéz as Tania Tejeda
- Luisa Galindo as Raquel
- Max Flores as Dr. Casillas
- Marco Antonio Zetina as Pablo
- Josué Guerra as Marco Dalton
- Rodrigo Urquidi as Luis
- Ana Sofía Sánchez as Tata
- María Fernanda García as Perla
- Vladimir Burciaga as Chepe Meneses
- Cirilo Santiago as Maldonado
- Natalia Jiménez as Cordelia Vélez
- Pepe Navarrete as Renato Valdez
- Fermín Martínez as Belisario Montenegro
- Ricardo Galina as Alejandro
- Lukas Urkijo as Gerardo
- Harding Junior as José
- Emilio Caballero as Julio
- Sergio Maya as Paco
- Mara López as Katia La Chava
- Ricardo Galina as Alejandro

== Episodes ==
No.	Title	Original release date	Colombia viewers (Rating points)
1	"Vicente Fernández sufre la muerte de un ser querido y abandona Jalisco con su padre"	3 August 2022	11.0
2	"La mamá y hermanas de Vicente están en peligro"	4 August 2022	10.1
3	"Vicente y su padre se vuelven a encontrar con las mujeres de su hogar"	5 August 2022	8.9
4	"Vicente empieza a evidenciar los problemas para manejar su vida profesional y familiar"	8 August 2022	8.4
5	"Vicente confronta a la periodista que manipuló la entrevista para perjudicarlo"	9 August 2022	7.5
6	"Vicente decide emprender camino lejos de su familia para trabajar por su sueño de ser cantante"	10 August 2022	7.7
7	"Vicente se entera que Cuca fue hospitalizada nuevamente"	11 August 2022	9.0
8	"Vicente y su familia son desalojados de su residencia"	12 August 2022	8.5
9	"Vicente busca la forma de cumplirle un sueño a su padre"	16 August 2022	8.2
10	"Vicente no se rinde e insiste en cantar con Lorena Cruz"	17 August 2022	7.6
11	"Vicente recibe la noticia de que podrá cumplirle el sueño a su padre"	18 August 2022	7.4
12	"La muerte persigue a Vicente y este debe afrontar las consecuencias"	19 August 2022	7.9
13	"Vicente conoce a Guillermo Zambrano, su nuevo productor"	22 August 2022	6.8
14	"Hilario les informa a todos que el álbum de Vicente se borró"	23 August 2022	7.5
15	"Vicente logra sorprender a la junta con su nuevo disco"	24 August 2022	7.3
16	"Vicente es engañado por Tiberio"	25 August 2022	6.7
17	"Vicente incursiona en el mundo de la actuación"	26 August 2022	7.0
18	"Cuca rompe fuente y da a luz a Alejandro"	29 August 2022	7.2
19	"Cuca ve la película protagonizada por Vicente y Tania"	30 August 2022	6.6
20	"Vicente se ve en aprietos por la mala gestión de Marco"	31 August 2022	6.9
21	"La carrera musical de Chente depende de Chucho"	1 September 2022	6.4
22	"Vicente pide un préstamo para producir 'Volver, volver'"	2 September 2022	6.7
23	"Con honor y talento, Vicente se gana la letra de una anhelada canción"	5 September 2022	7.4
24	"El amor como forma de salir de apuros: Vicente logra quitarse a una mujer de encima"	6 September 2022	6.7
25	"Vicente se encuentra en una encrucijada al llegar a su gira en Nicaragua"	7 September 2022	5.9
26	"Lucha por un amor: Vicente busca evitar que Cuca se case con otro hombre"	8 September 2022	8.0
27	"¡Que viva el amor! Vicente y Cuca contraen matrimonio y pronto reciben una gran noticia"	9 September 2022	6.5
28	"¿Se retira de la música? Vicente hace un inesperado anuncio"	12 September 2022	7.2
29	"Vicente firma un importante contrato para ser parte del mundo de la televisión"	13 September 2022	6.5
30	"¿Nuevamente lo visita la muerte? Chente tiene a tres seres queridos en peligro"	14 September 2022	7.5
31	"Vicente es acusado de asesinato tras la muerte de 'Tico' Mendoza"	15 September 2022	7.1
32	"Vicente descubre el embarazo de Tere y enfrenta al hombre que sería el padre"	16 September 2022	6.5

== Production ==
=== Development ===
On 20 September 2021, El Rey, Vicente Fernández was ordered to series by Caracol Televisión and Netflix. The series had been in development since December 2019. It is the version authorized by Vicente Fernández's family, unlike El último rey, an unauthorized version by TelevisaUnivision, which the family publicly condemned. A total of 36 episodes have been confirmed.

=== Casting ===
On 30 September 2021, it was announced that Jaime Camil would portray Vicente Fernández. On 27 January 2022, Marcela Guirado was announced in the role of Doña Cuquita, Vicente Fernández's wife.

=== Filming ===
Filming began on 20 September 2021 in Hidalgo, Mexico, and concluded in March 2022.

== Release ==
In Colombia, the series premiered on 3 August 2022, on Caracol Televisión. Internationally, the series began streaming on Netflix on 14 September 2022.

== Reception ==
=== Television ratings ===
Season	Timeslot (COT)	Episodes	First aired		Last aired		Avg. viewers (in points)
Season	Timeslot (COT)	Episodes	Date	Viewers (in points)	Date	Viewers (in points)	Avg. viewers (in points)
1	Mon–Fri 9:30 p.m.	32	3 August 2022	11.0	16 September 2022	6.5	7.5

=== Awards and nominations ===
Year	Award	Category	Nominated	Result	Ref
2022	Produ Awards	Best Superseries	El rey, Vicente Fernández	Won	
2022	Produ Awards	Best Lead Actress - Superseries or Telenovela	Marcela Guirado	Nominated	
2022	Produ Awards	Best Lead Actor - Superseries or Telenovela	Jaime Camil	Won	
2022	Produ Awards	Best Newcomer Actress / Actor	Kaled Acab	Won	
2022	Produ Awards	Best Directing - Superseries or Telenovela	Fernando Urdapilleta, Conrado Martínez, and Andrés Lizarazo	Won	
2022	Produ Awards	Best Fiction Production - Superseries or Telenovela	Harold Sánchez	Won	
2022	Produ Awards	Best Screenplay - Superseries or Telenovela	Johnny Alexander Ortiz, Daniela Richer, Luis Guerrero, Enrique Rentería y Rodrigo Ordóñez	Nominated	
2022	Produ Awards	Best Creative Directing	Mónica Neumaier de Hoyos	Nominated	
2023	India Catalina Awards	Best Fiction Series - Long Form	El rey, Vicente Fernández	Nominated	
2023	India Catalina Awards	Best Child Talent	Kaled Acab	Nominated	
2023	India Catalina Awards	Best Musical Director	Lynn Fainchtei	Nominated	
