= Antonio Durán "Morris" =

Spanish actor

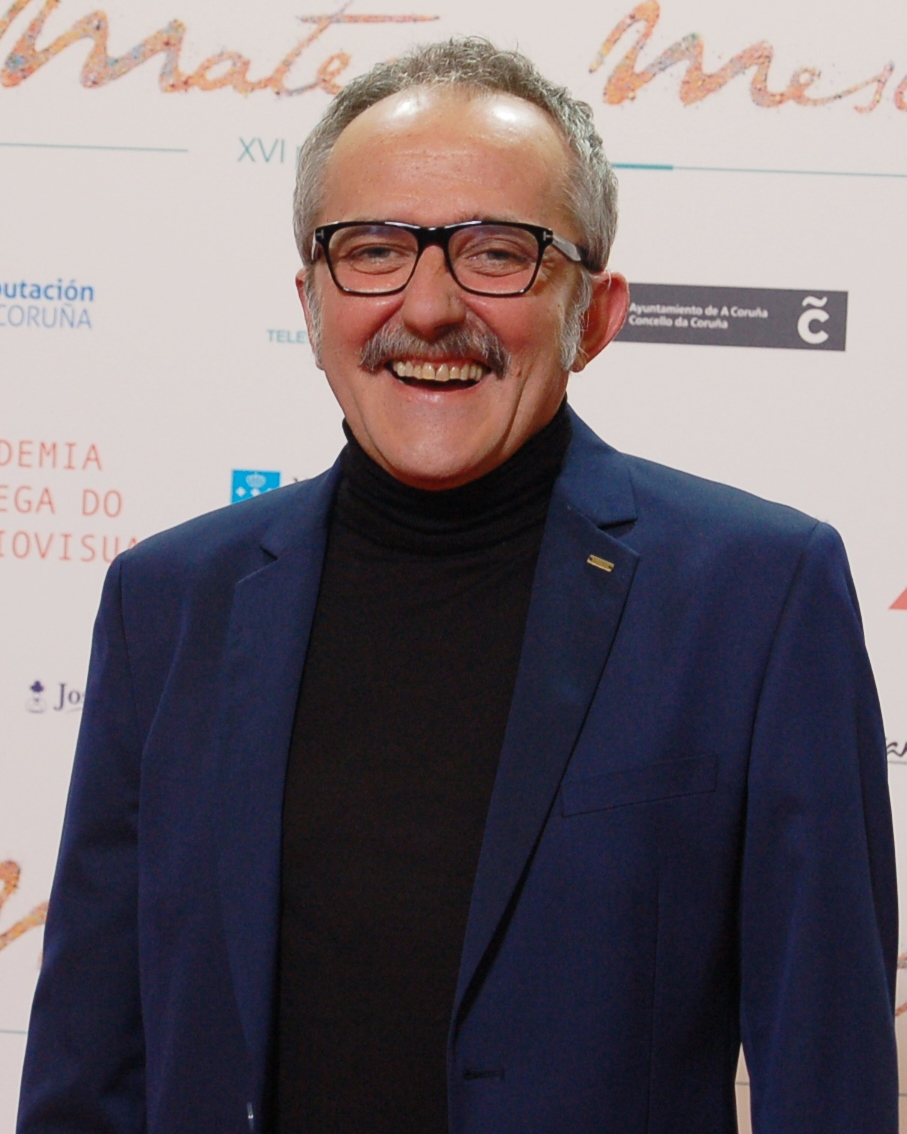
- Morris in 2017.
- Born: Antonio Segundo Durán Moreiras; 9 July 1959 (age 66); Teis, Vigo, Spain
- Other names: Morris; Antonio Durán Morris
- Occupation: Actor
- Years active: 1978–present
- Partner(s): Enma Pino (1986–2014)

Antonio Segundo Durán Moreiras (born 1959), often credited as Antonio Durán "Morris", is a Spanish actor. A popular television actor in his native Galicia, he became regionally known due to his performance in series such as Pratos combinados.

== Biography ==
Antonio Segundo Durán Moreiras was born in 1959 in the parish of Teis, in the municipality of Vigo. He worked for the Centro Dramático Galego and founded the Artello theatre group. He earned recognition in Galicia for his television performance in the soap opera Pratos combinados, which ran from 1995 to 2006. He also starred in Padre Casares, Air Galicia, and Zapping Comando. A performer specialised in supporting roles in Spanish cinema, his film credits include performances in Continental (1990), Atilano presidente (1998), Mondays in the Sun (2002), Princesses (2005), Mataharis (2007), Doentes (2011), A esmorga (2014), and Os fenómenos.

== Filmography ==
=== Film ===
Year	Title	Role	Notes	Ref.
2002	Los lunes al sol (Mondays in the Sun)	Director de banco		
2005	Princesas (Princesses)	Funcionario		
2009	Celda 211 (Cell 211)	Borrego		
2010	Amador	Samuel		
2014	A esmorga	Milhomes		
2017	Dhogs	Taxi driver		
2017	Pieles (Skins)	Simón		
2018	El pacto (The Pact)	Intruso		
2018	El aviso (The Warning)	Doctor Alberto Vizcay		
2020	Ons	Doctor Vicente		
2023	Honeymoon	Mario		

=== Television ===
Year	Title	Role	Notes	Ref
1995–2006	Pratos combinados	Antón Santos		
2017	El final del camino	Odamiro		
2008–2014	Padre Casares	Edelmiro Ferreira		
2018	Fariña (Cocaine Coast)	Manuel Charlín		
2019–2020	Alta mar (High Seas)	Detective Varela		
2020	Néboa	Antón		
2025	Animal (Old Dog, New Tricks)		Netflix	

== Accolades ==
Year	Award	Category	Work	Result	Ref.
2015	13th Mestre Mateo Awards	Best Actor	A Esmorga	Won	
2015	13th Mestre Mateo Awards	Best Supporting Actor	Códice	Won	
2018	16th Mestre Mateo Awards	Best Supporting Actor	Dhogs	Won	
2019	6th Feroz Awards	Best Supporting Actor (TV)	Cocaine Coast	Won	
2019	17th Mestre Mateo Awards	Best Actor	Os Mariachis	Nominated	
2019	28th Actors and Actresses Union Awards	Best Television Actor in a Secondary Role	Cocaine Coast	Won	
2021	19th Mestre Mateo Awards	Best Actor	Ons	Won	
