= Operación Nécora =

Spanish Police Operation

Operation Necora (Spanish: Operación Nécora, lit. Velvet Crab) was a major Spanish police operation against drug traffickers in Galicia, Spain. It led to the arrest of 54 people.

== Background ==
In the 1970s fishermen from declining fishing towns along the Galician coastline turned to the more lucrative occupation of importing contraband cigarettes from the United States; At that time the sole manufacturer of cigarettes in Spain was Tabacalera, a monopolistic state-owned company.

The topography of the Arousan coastline, dotted with coves and inlets, allowed these tabaqueros to bring in the contraband under the cover of darkness and from there distribute it throughout Spain. In the 1980s, the Medellín cartel, under pressure from the US authorities and a saturated North American cocaine market turned to Europe, the smugglers utilized the methods developed in the previous decade to import hashish, and later cocaine for the cartels. From the town of Vilagarcía de Arousa - the main distribution point for the smugglers - Colombian traffickers from Madrid would collect the drugs and distribute them throughout the rest of Spain.

=== Investigation ===
The investigation into the international trafficking of drugs through Galicia was prompted by a letter sent in August 1989 by Ricardo Portabales Rodríguez, a drug dealer serving a prison sentence, to Luciano Varela, an investigating magistrate of Pontevedra's provincial court. The inquisitorial system used in Spanish civil law required further investigation by an investigating magistrate. Varela deemed the case to be too big for a provincial court to investigate so it was transferred to the Audiencia Nacional, Spain's highest criminal court. A 35-year-old magistrate in Baltasar Garzón was charged with carrying out the investigation. The investigation was carried out with the assistance of Section IV of the Central Narcotics Department (Servicio Central de Estupefacientes). Garzón used testimony from two informants known in the media as los arrepentidos (The penitents): the aforementioned Ricardo Portabales Rodríguez and Manuel Fernández Padín, an actual member of one of the clans, to build the case against the traffickers.

== Operation Mago ==
On the morning of June 12, 1990 a hundred vehicles containing 350 officers from the Central Narcotics Department, flown in specifically from Madrid to prevent any possible leaks from the local police force, left the main police station in the Galician capital, Santiago de Compostela, heading for the comarca of O Salnés. From there, each vehicle went on to their pre-assigned targets in different towns throughout the comarca. The operation was initially known as Operación Mago (Operation Magi) - Garzón was told that they had named it after himself; however, he rejected this name and they settled on Operación Necora.

The base of operations was Vilagarcía de Arousa's police station, the former local party headquarters of the Falange. It was carried out under the judicial supervision of Baltsar Garzón, Luciano Varela and Javier Zaragoza, the deputy anti-drug prosecutor.

== Trial ==
On September 6, 1990 the Anti-drug prosecutor presented an indictment against 49 of those arrested (Indictment 13/90). Of the remaining five, the prosecutor's office started a separate proceeding against three: Marcial Dorado Baúnde "Marcial de la Isla", Michel Haengi and Miguel Rivero González on the grounds of money-laundering - something that would delay the start of the main trial. Luis Falcon Pérez "Falconetti" and Tomás Leis Carlés were released on bail, however, they remained imprisoned on unrelated charges.

== See also ==
- Carmen Avedaño
- Operación Pitón
- Galician mafia
- Fariña (TV series)
