= A esmorga =

1959 novel by Eduardo Blanco Amor

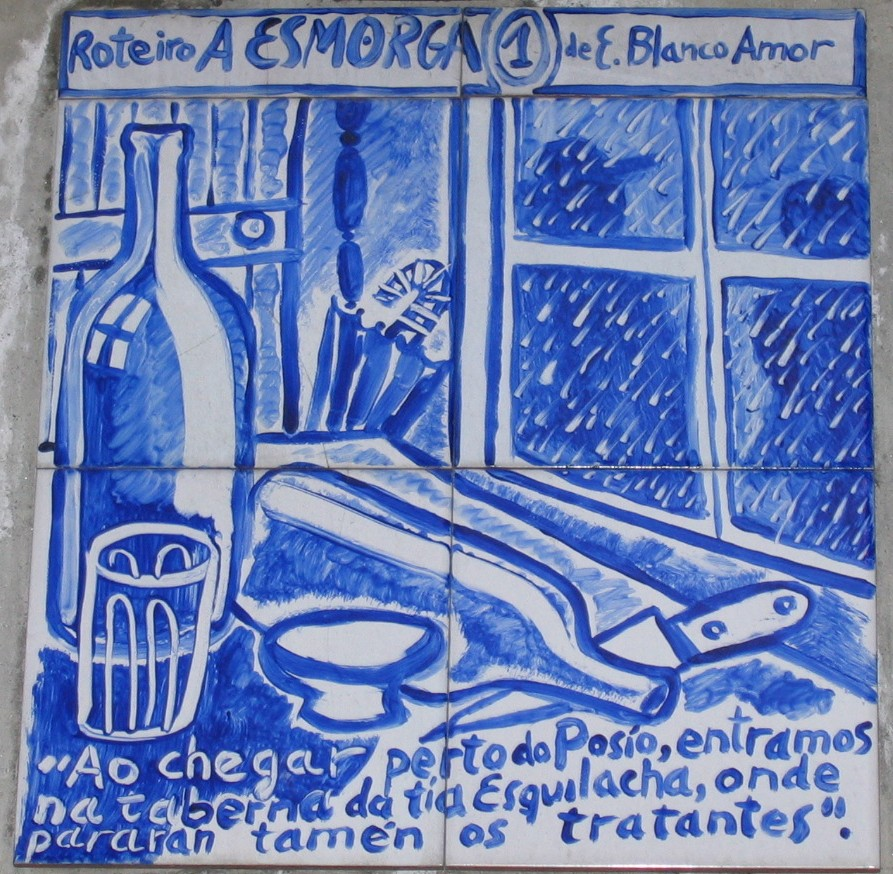
A Esmorga

A Esmorga is a novel by Galician writer Eduardo Blanco Amor from 1959. It tells about a 24-hour drinking spree of a man called Cibrán o Castizo and his two friends Xanciño o Bocas and Aladio Milhomes, in a town called Auria, very similar to real life town Ourense. Cibrán tells his story to the police, trying to show himself in the best possible light. The day contains celebrations, fire and a visit to a brothel.

The adventure narrated in A Esmorga occurred 40 years before its narration, and was collected through a process of research of sources and documents.

The book has been filmed twice: in 1977 by Gonzalo Suárez under name of Parranda, and in 2014 by Ignacio Vilar as A Esmorga.
