= Alfonso Agra =

Spanish film, television, and voice actor

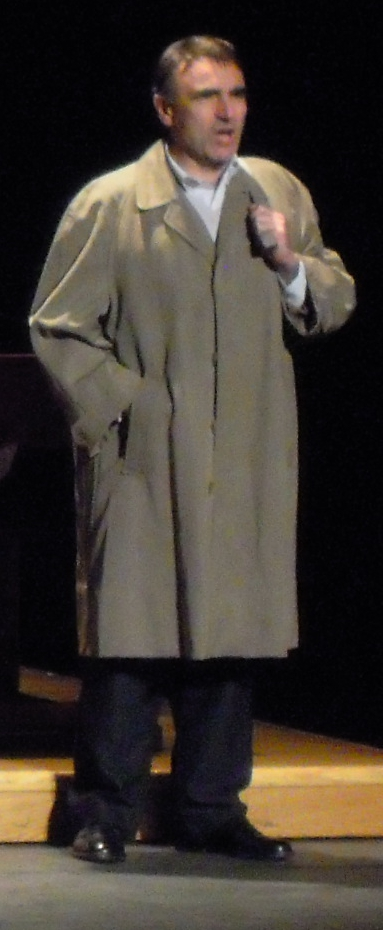
- Born: Alfonso Agra Tato; 30 January 1959 (age 66); Arzúa, A Coruña, Spain
- Occupation(s): Actor and Dubbing actor
- Years active: 1984–present

Alfonso Agra Tato is a Spanish actor. He is very active in some of the most popular Galician television series and has also starred in various films spoken in both Spanish and Galician, most notably Wedding Days and A esmorga.

He is also well known for his voice acting work, providing the voices for Freeza and Kami in the Galician dub of Dragon Ball Z Kai as well as the voice for Cell in Galicia's Dragon Ball GT dub.

== Selected filmography ==
=== Television ===
- Mareas vivas – Televisión de Galicia
- Pratos combinados – Televisión de Galicia
- Terra de Miranda – Televisión de Galicia
- O show dos Tonechos – Televisión de Galicia
- Cocaine Coast – Antena 3

=== Film Roles ===
- Wedding Days
- A esmorga
- Heroine

=== Voice acting roles ===
- Dragon Ball GT (Galician dub) – Cell, Nuova Shenron and Don Para
- Dragon Ball Z Kai (Galician dub) – Freeza, Kami, Chaozu and Caroni
- Dave (Galician dub)
- Fly Away Home (Galician dub)
- The Craft (Galician dub)
- The Beautiful Country (Galician dub)
