= Galician Mafia =

Drug smuggling organizations in Spain

Galician mafia
- Founding location: Spain
- Years active: 1980s–present
- Territory: Spain, Portugal, France, Italy, United Kingdom
- Ethnicity: Galician
- Activities: Drug trafficking, Cigarette smuggling, Assassination, Bank fraud, Bankruptcy fraud, Blackmailing, Bribery, Contract killing, Infiltration of Politics, Money laundering, Murder, Police corruption, Political corruption, Witness intimidation, Witness tampering.
- Allies: Colombian cartels Gaitanist Army of Colombia (Clan del Golfo cartel); Medellin Cartel; Cali Cartel; Mexican drug cartels Sinaloa Cartel; British crime firms French Milieu; Corsican mafia Gang de la Brise de Mer; Camorra; Cosa Nostra 'Ndrangheta
- Notable members: Manuel Charlín, Sito Miñanco

The Galician mafia or Galician organized crime, Galician clans are drug smuggling groups in the Spanish region of Galicia. Due to the activities of these clans, Galicia is often cited as being the main European entry point for Colombian cocaine.

== Activities ==
Traditionally the region of Galicia made its money from the fishing industry, to which the coastal geography of the region lent itself. Following the crippling of the fishing industry, local fishermen began smuggling tobacco to keep their business alive. The successfulness of these tobacco smuggling activities led to the creation of clan-based groups who made their entire living off smuggling.

Galician smuggling networks nowadays not solely concentrate on tobacco. It was when local criminal clans began making contacts in Colombia and Morocco that the illegal smuggling business began to thrive. Using their Colombian and Moroccan contacts, Galician organized crime groups traffic cocaine and hashish, aside from illegal tobacco, into the Spanish mainland. From Galicia it is distributed to major cities in Spain via other Galician contacts or via criminal groups consisting of Colombian expatriates. Drugs are frequently trafficked to the neighbouring regions of Portugal northern as well. Aside from Portugal, British Firms have set up contacts in Galicia, often working together with Galician criminal clans to bring in narcotics which the British gangs in turn smuggle into and distribute in the United Kingdom. Currently some clans are importing and distributing heroin, and have done business with the Albanian and Turkish mafias.

Criminal clans in the region have frequently been hostile to each other in recent years. While the Galician smuggling business in the beginning was very local, the internationalization of the organized criminal activities have led to crime-related clan feuds where murder, kidnapping and torture is occasionally committed by criminal Galician clan-members or Colombian contacts and contract killers.

Some clans have or had a very violent conduct. One of the most famous acts of violence related to the illegal drug trade was the massacre of "O Hostal da Ría", in Vilanova de Arousa on 26 January 1997, where a drug dealer killed five people to avoid having witnesses of his involvement in heroin trafficking.

In the 1980s and 90s, to gain popular respect, narcos financed popular festivities, schools, football teams and helped people in need. One of the most famous cases was the financing of the football team Juventud Cambados by Sito Miñanco. Despite being a team from a small town its players were among the best paid of Spain.

== Allegations of political corruption ==
Allegations of political corruption arose when pictures were found of Galician premier Alberto Núñez Feijóo vacationing with convicted smuggler Marcial Dorado. This had led to local belief that certain Galician crime clans have infiltrated local politics.

The People's Party of Galicia has been accused of being financed with narco money.

Some local politicians have also been arrested due to their relation with organized crime, like Alfredo Bea Gondar (mayor of O Grove from 1983 to 1991) or José Ramón Barral Martínez "Nené" (mayor of Ribadumia from 1983 to 2001).

== Notable clans ==
=== Los Charlines ===
Led by Manuel Charlín Gama they are probably the most notable organized crime clan operating in the region. Their main areas of income are drug trafficking and cigarette smuggling. They've also been involved in murder and witness intimidation. Their main areas of activity are Spain and Portugal. Manuel Charlín was arrested on 9 August 2018 in major anti-drugs operation.

=== Os Caneos ===
Active in the same branch as the Charlín clan, the clan founded by Manuel Baulo are said to have the best contacts with British crime groups. They are involved in a feud with the Charlín clan.

=== Fernández clan ===
Owners of several brothels, between Fernando and Raul, the clan has been managing a multimillionaire empire of fine prostitutes. The founder, Fernando Fernandez Fernandez, has evaded Spanish justice and currently resides in Milton Keynes.

=== Oubiña clan ===
One of the most powerful clans in the 1980s, then under the leadership of Laureano Oubiña, based in Vilagarcía de Arousa. David Pérez is their current leader. There have been claims that the People's Party was financed by them.

=== Os Romas ===
Group based in Cambados, led by a local businessman that was arrested in 2007.

=== Os Lulús ===
Clan based in Muxía that control cocaine traffic in A Costa da Morte region. Is currently considered the most powerful clan.

=== Os Piturros ===
Familiar clan of Vilanova de Arousa.

=== Os do Barbanza ===
Not a clan, but an association of various small leaders from the county of O Barbanza, the majority are now missing.

=== Os Pulgós ===
A small clan from Boiro that normally works for bigger clans.

=== Neaño clan ===
Based in the area of Bergantiños, and led by Elisa González Botana (arrested in 2014).
