= María Castro (actress) =

Spanish TV presenter and actress

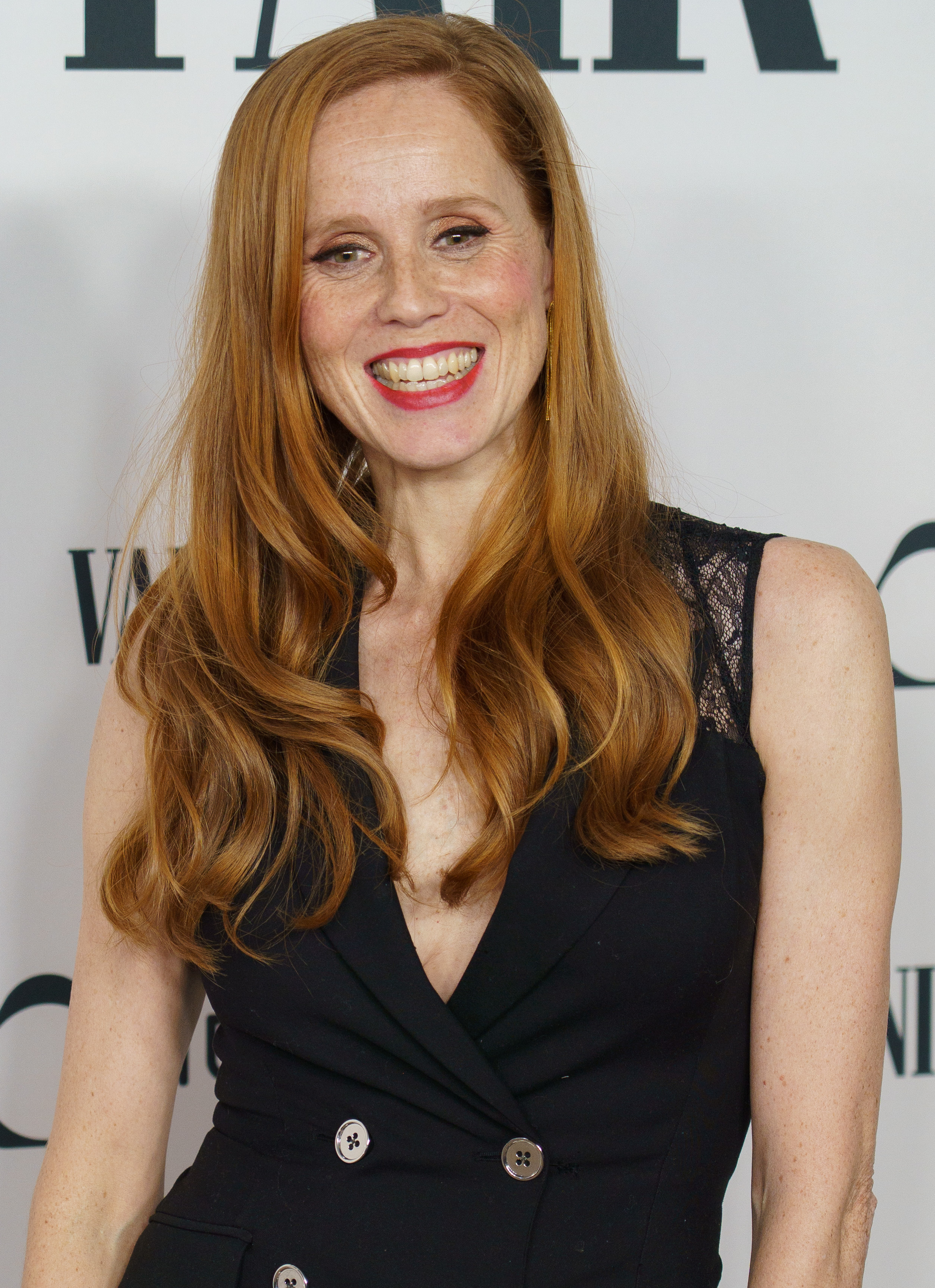
- Castro in 2025
- Born: María Castro Jato; 30 November 1981 (age 44); Vigo, Spain
- Education: University of Vigo
- Occupations: Actress; presenter
- Height: 1.74 m (5 ft 8 1/2 in)
- Spouse: José Manuel Villalba (m. 2018)

María Castro Jato (born 30 November 1981) is a Spanish actress, TV presenter, dancer and rhythmic gymnast.

== Career ==
She studies sports science in the Pontevedra Campus. She was runner-up at the Campeonato de España Individual de Gimnasia Rítmica. On 10 January 2010 she played Mollie Ralston in the stage The Mousetrap, by Agatha Christie, along with Gorka Otxoa, Leo Rivera, Paco Churruca, Aroa Gimeno, Álvaro Roig, Maribel Ripoll and Guillermo Muñoz. On 3 September 2012 she appeared in a topless photo on Interviú. In 2013 she appeared simultaneously in Vive cantando and Tierra de lobos. In 2018, she co-starred the animated film Memoirs of a Man in Pajamas (alongside Raúl Arévalo) voicing Jilguero.

== Personal life ==
On 15 September 2018, she married the actor José Manuel Villalba. On 22 June 2016, she gave birth to the couple's first child, a girl, whom they called Maia Villalba Castro. On 1 October 2020, she gave birth to the couple's second child, a girl, whom they called Olivia Villalba Castro. On 9 April 2024, she gave birth to the couple's third child a girl, whom they called Emma Villalba Castro.

== Awards and nominees ==
In 2009, she was awarded by the Premios Ondas and she won the Premio Carabela de Oro de Baiona. In 2014, she won Best Actress for the TV series Vive cantando.

== Filmography ==
=== Television ===
| Year | Title | Role | Notes | Ref |
|---|---|---|---|---|
| 1995–2006 | Pratos combinados | Paula Barreiro | | |
| 2002 | Avenida de América | Sara | 13 episodes | |
| 2006–2007 | SMS (Sin Miedo a Soñar) | Lucía Jimeno | 187 episodes | |
| 2008–2009 | Sin tetas no hay paraíso | Jessica | | |
| 2010–2014 | Tierra de lobos | Elena Valdés | | |
| 2013–2014 | Vive cantando | Trini | Lead role | |
| 2015–2017 | Seis Hermanas | Francisca Silva | | |
| 2017–2018 | Ella es tu padre | Carmen | | |
| 2018–2019 | Amar es para siempre | Natalia Medina / Ana López | | |
| 2023 | La Promesa | Pía Adarre | | |
