= Laureano Oubiña =

Spanish smuggler and drug trafficker

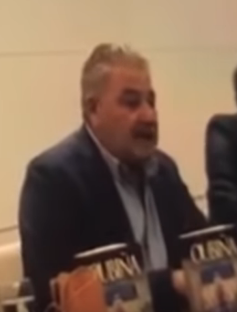
- Laureano Oubiña presenting his book, "Oubiña, toda la verdad"
- Born: 30 March 1946; A Modia
- Other names: el Pajarito
- Occupation: Smuggling, drug trafficker
- Spouse(s): Esther Lago García, Rosa María Carro

Laureano Oubiña Piñeiro (born 1946), also known as El Pajarito (The Birdie), is a Spanish smuggler and drug trafficker.

== Personal life ==
Born in Cambados, Oubiña began working in his parents' grocery store at the age of 10, and by 15 was distributing products by van to street hawkers. He began his criminal career at the age of 17, at first participating in diesel smuggling with his uncle, and a few months later founding his own black market tobacco company.

He married Rosa María Otero at the age of 18, and went on to have eight children with her; however, they divorced in 1983. After the divorce, he began a relationship with Esther Lago, who had been his secretary, and had an additional three children with her. Lago died in a traffic accident on 28 February 2001.

== Arrests and prosecutions ==
=== Early criminal activity ===
Oubiña's judicial record dates back to 1978, when he was sentenced to nine months in prison for bribery. A few years later, in 1983, he was arrested in Playa de Aro after the discovery of a large cargo of smuggled tobacco. Police searched a number of his companies and his personal residence, the Pazo Baión, on 6 July 1989, where sophisticated telecommunications equipment and a rifle were discovered; less than a year later, on 23 April 1990, he was acquitted on charges of smuggling and illegal possession of firearms, but sentenced to four months for resisting the authorities. However, as he had served more than the sentenced time awaiting trial, he did not go to prison.

=== Operation Crab ===
On 12 June 1990, he and Esther Lago were both arrested near the Ría de Arousa after an order by Baltasar Garzón during Operación Nécora (Operation Crab), a Spanish police operation against drug traffickers in Galicia. They were both sentenced on 27 September 1994 to 12 years in jail and a fine of 1,280,000,000 pesetas each for money laundering, being acquitted once again of charges of drug trafficking. On 7 December of the same year Oubiña was released on parole, while Esther Lago did not leave prison until 1997.

=== Operations Sunrise and Sunset ===
On 21 June 1997, a truck carrying 5,741 kilograms of hashish from Galicia to the Netherlands was discovered in Martorell. Oubiña was implicated in the smuggling, and was subsequently arrested in another raid known as Operación Amanecer (Operation Sunrise). He was held in prison awaiting trial until December 1998, when he posted a bail of 15 million pesetas. In October 1999 Esther Lago and David Pérez Lago, Esther's son with her previous husband, were detained in another police operation, operación Ocaso (Operation Sunset), after 15 tons of hashish were again found on a boat and connected to Oubiña; however, he himself escaped arrest, although a warrant was issued for him. His escape was controversial as El País later reported that he had been in a police station to satisfy his bail requirements just hours before fleeing custody.

=== Trafficking sentence and extradition ===
Just a few days after the culmination of Operation Sunset in October 1999, Oubiña was for the first time sentenced for drug trafficking by the Audiencia Nacional, the Spanish high court. He was sentenced in his absence to four years and four months in prison, along with a fine of 2,400,000,000 pesetas, and an international arrest warrant was simultaneously authorised for his capture. His lawyer was also sentenced to four years in prison and a fine of 1,400,000,000 pesetas.

Oubiña was detained along with his stepson David Pérez Lago in Greece in 2000, pursuant to an international arrest warrant issued against him after escaping custody during Operation Sunset. By the autumn of 2000, he had started serving his prison sentence, when his spouse died suddenly in a traffic accident. He was given permission by the Audiencia Nacional to attend her funeral and burial.

In 2011, while in prison in Dueñas, the Audiencia Nacional granted him "grade 3" prisoner status, meaning he could be held in an open prison, and was freed on 17 July 2012. He returned to prison on 6 February 2014 to serve a sentence of 4 years and 7 months which had been imposed upon him in 2012 for money laundering. On 24 February 2017, whilst in prison in Navalcarnero, a judge granted him once again grade 3 prisoner status; however, he left prison on 13 March after a battle with the prison board, who claimed that he should not have been released.

== Illegal financing of the People's Alliance ==
In 2017, during an interview with Cadena SER, Oubiña asserted that he had proof of his illegally financing the People's Alliance political party.
