= Mestre Mateo Awards =

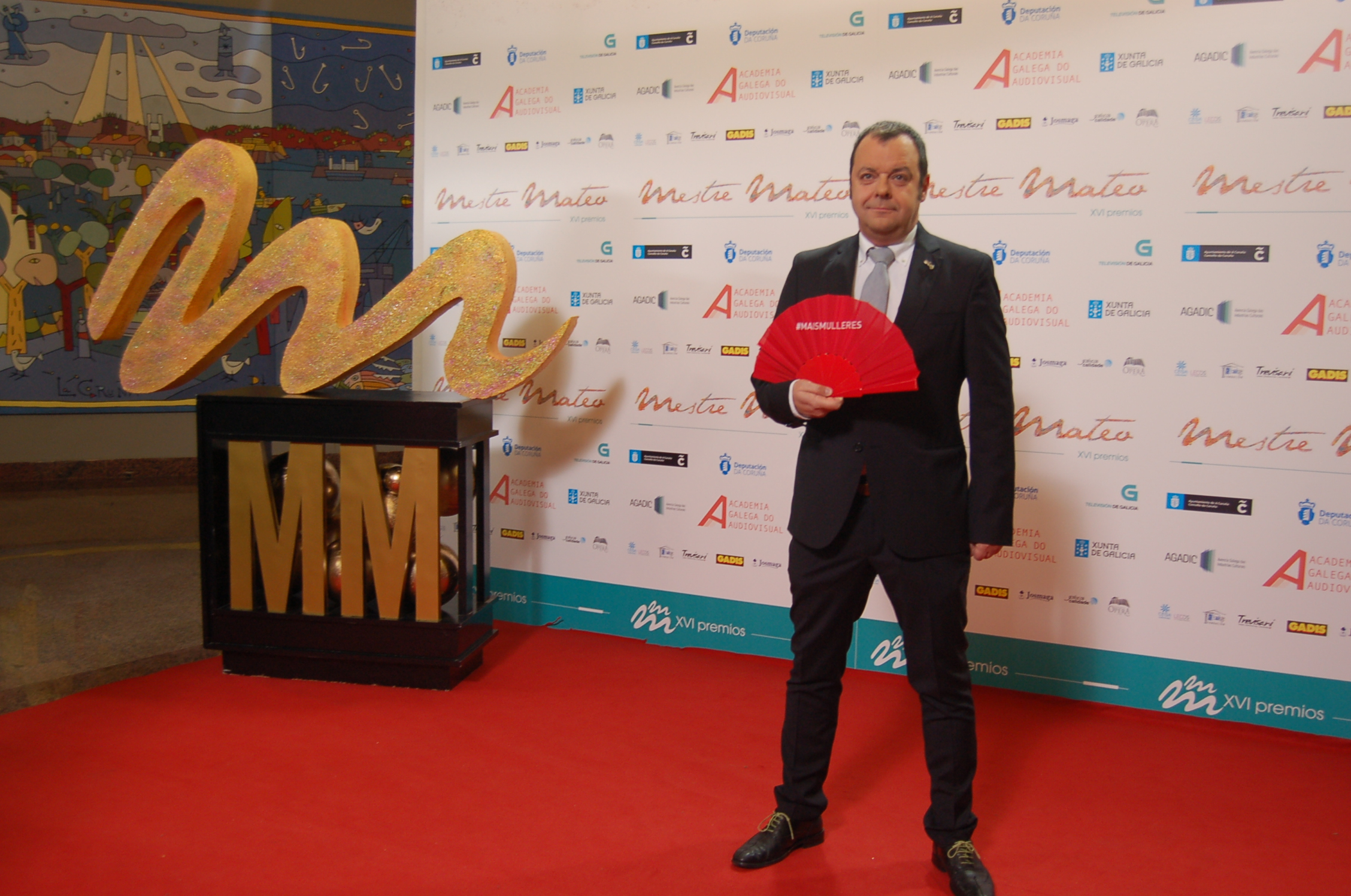
Mestre Mateo Awards, 2017.

The Mestre Mateo Awards, known in Galician as Premios Mestre Mateo, are the main film awards in Galicia, celebrated annually. The awards were established in 2002 by the Galician Academy of Audiovisual as a continuation and expansion of the Chano Piñeiro Awards (Premios Chano Piñeiro), originally established in 2002.

The trophy is inspired by the Master Mateo's Santo dos Croques, a sculpture of the Santiago de Compostela Cathedral.

== Past ceremonies ==
The following is a listing of all Mestre Mateo Awards ceremonies.

Ceremony	Date	Best Film	Host(s)	Venue
Mestre Mateo Awards 2003	April 7, 2003	Mondays in the Sun	Javier Veiga	Auditorio de Galicia (Santiago de Compostela)
Mestre Mateo Awards 2004	June 26, 2004	Trece badaladas O lapis do carpinteiro	Javier Veiga	Pazo de Congresos (Santiago de Compostela)
Mestre Mateo Awards 2005	March 20, 2005	O ano da carracha	Moncho Borrajo	Teatro Sala de Concertos de Caixanova (Vigo)
Mestre Mateo Awards 2006	March 19, 2006	León and Olvido	Luis Piedrahita	PALEXCO (A Coruña)
Mestre Mateo Awards 2007	May 9, 2007	Un franco, 14 pesetas	Manuel Manquiña and Antonio Durán "Morris"	Teatro Colón (A Coruña)
Mestre Mateo Awards 2008	April 15, 2008	O neno de barro	Manuel Manquiña and Antonio Durán "Morris"	Teatro Jofre (Ferrol)
Mestre Mateo Awards 2009	April 30, 2009	Os mortos van á présa	Sergio Zearreta	Pazo da Cultura (Pontevedra)
Mestre Mateo Awards 2010	April 17, 2010	Cela 211	Xosé Antonio Touriñán	Pazo da Cultura (Narón)
Mestre Mateo Awards 2011	April 28, 2011	18 Meals	Belén Regueira and Xosé Antonio Touriñán	Auditorio Municipal (Ourense)
Mestre Mateo Awards 2012	January 28, 2012	Doentes	María Castro	PALEXCO (A Coruña)
Mestre Mateo Awards 2013	April 6, 2013	The Apostle	Cristina Castaño	Palacio da Ópera (A Coruña)
Mestre Mateo Awards 2014	April 12, 2014	Somos xente honrada	Roberto Vilar	PALEXCO (A Coruña)
Mestre Mateo Awards 2015	April 11, 2015	Aces	Roberto Vilar	PALEXCO (A Coruña)
Mestre Mateo Awards 2016	April 23, 2016	Retribution	Marga Pazos and Xosé Antonio Touriñán	Palacio da Ópera (A Coruña)
Mestre Mateo Awards 2017	March 4, 2017	María (and Everybody Else)	Iolanda Muíños	PALEXCO (A Coruña)
Mestre Mateo Awards 2018	March 3, 2018	Dhogs	Iolanda Muíños	Palacio da Ópera (A Coruña)
