= Principe (disambiguation) =

Príncipe is the smaller of the two major islands of São Tomé and Príncipe lying off the west coast of Africa.

Principe may also refer to:

- Il Principe, a political treatise
- Principe (surname), an Italian surname
- Principe (Genoa Metro), Italy, a station
- The Italian or Romanian term for a prince

Príncipe may also refer to:

- Príncipe Province, São Tomé and Príncipe
- Príncipe (Ceuta), Spain
- Castle del Príncipe (Havana), a colonial castle in Havana, Cuba
- Pedrosa del Príncipe, a municipality of Castile and León, Spain
- Puebla del Príncipe, a municipality in Castile–La Mancha, Spain
- La Revancha Del Príncipe Charro, the second album released by the Mexican band Panda
- The Spanish or Portuguese term for a prince

== See also ==
- Casita del Príncipe (disambiguation)
- El Príncipe (disambiguation)
