= Indigenous Documentation Center No'lhametwet =

Argentine Indigenous archive

Indigenous Documentation Center (Centro de Documentación Indígena)
- No'lhametwet
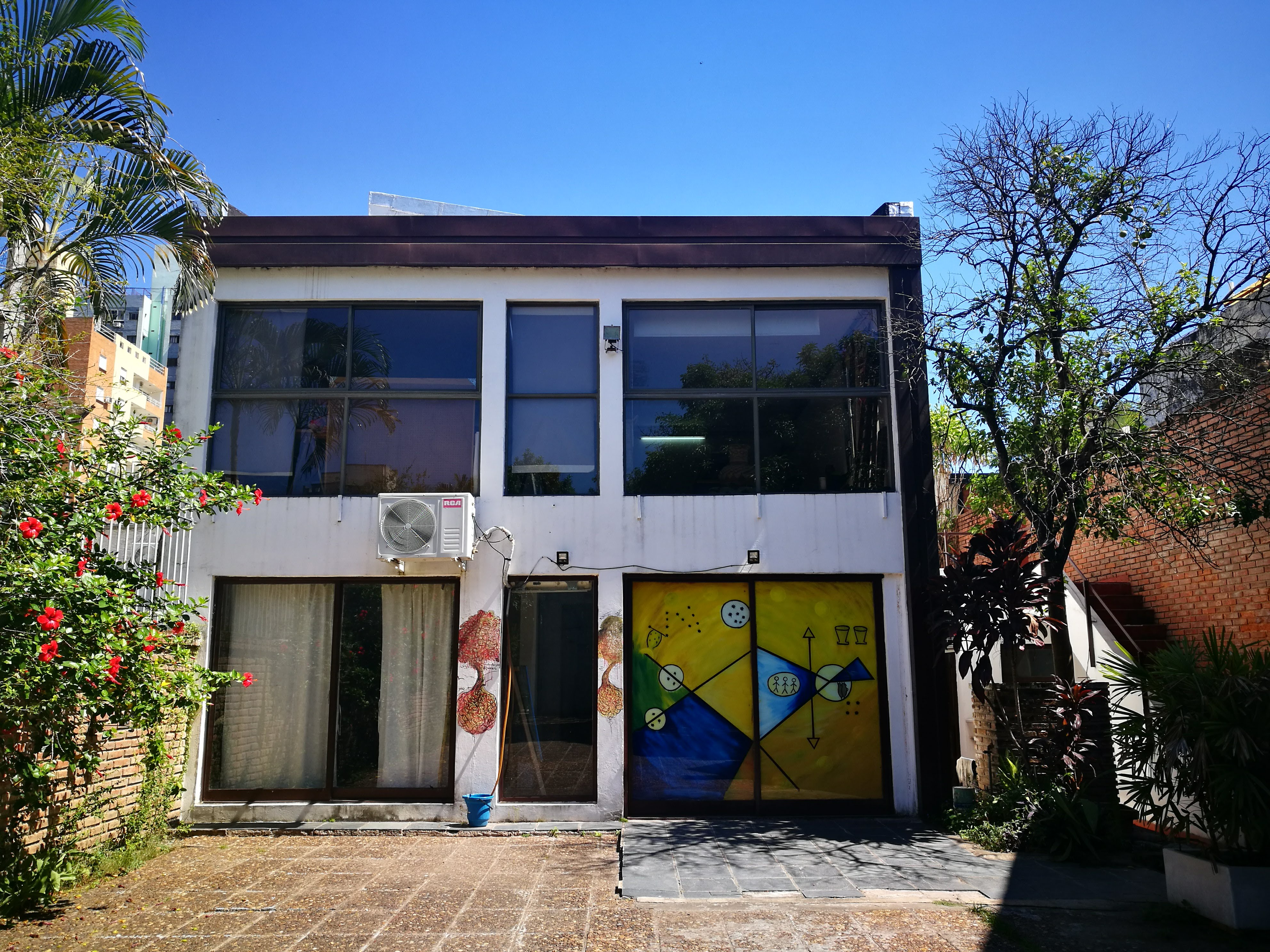
- Abbreviation: CDI
- Formation: 2015
- Type: Public archive
- Headquarters: Resistencia, Chaco
- Location: Argentina
- Official language: Spanish

The Indigenous Documentation Center (Centro de Documentación Indígena No'lhametwet or CDI) is an Argentine center specialized in Indigenous subjects which compiles, organizes and promotes documental productions generated by authors, cultural models and institutions linked to Indigenous peoples. It is located on Pellegrini Street, number 272, in the city of Resistencia, Chaco, Argentina. It is managed together by Indigenous and non-Indigenous workers from the Institute of Culture of Chaco Province, mostly Wichí, Qom (Toba people) and Moqoit (Mocoví), who plan and execute activities coordinated and conducted by Indigenous personnel. Its name ‘No’lhametwet’ is a Wichí term meaning 'place of our word'.

== History ==
It originated with a group of Indigenous workers from the Culture Program of Indigenous Peoples, who made the CDI's project in 2015 as a way of protecting documentary, craftsmanship and bibliographic collections given to the Program as individual donations. Among those donations are the photographic archives of the Chelaalapí Qom Choir and the Mempo Giardinelli Collection, both received in 2016, the artisanal Qom mask collection received in 2018 and the craftsmanship collection received from the Chaco Artisanal Foundation in the same year.

Since 2018, audio-visual productions about Indigenous peoples are available, among those the short ‘Wuyéss, the fire rescuer’ and its publications in the CDI's library and webpage.

The CDI is the first institution in the Chaco Province which generates its own productions from compiling information in printed and digital documentary sources about the Indigenous theme. It has a library specialized in it, with bilingual editions in different Indigenous languages and publication from Indigenous authors, a documentary and audio-visual archive, a craftsmanship collection protected by a conservation area, an investigation area and another one for extension, which articulate activities with educational, research and cultural institutions.

Since 2019, the CDI is a part of the Coalition for the Eradication of Racism in Higher Education, an initiative carried out by UNTREF and UNESCO.

== Activities ==
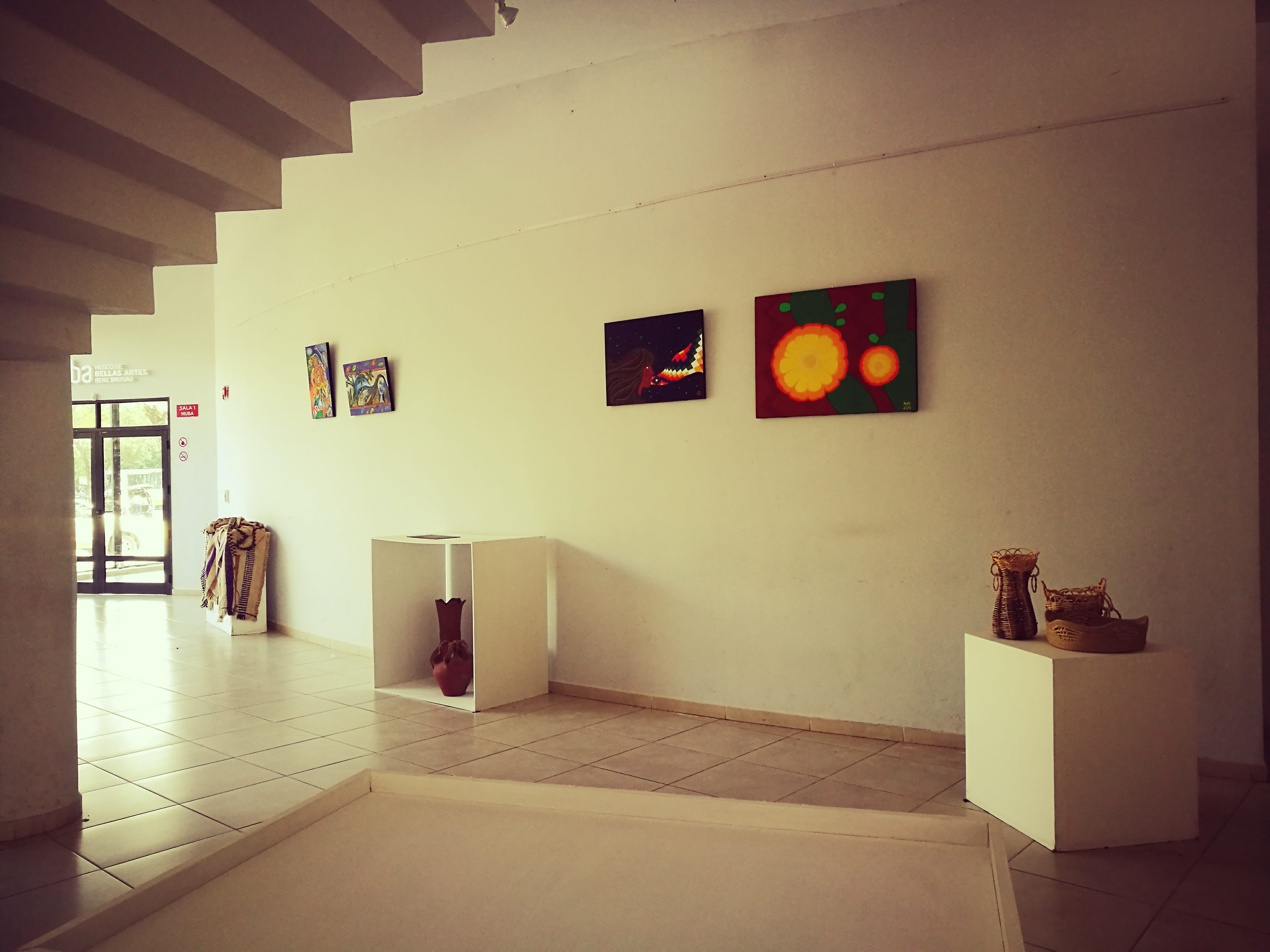
Indigenous craftsmanship exhibition in Casa de las Culturas

CDI No’lhametwet has organized several activities for the visibility and dissemination of the regional Indigenous people's knowledge through discussion groups, workshops as well as photographic and craftsmanship exhibitions.

In addition it also participates in various events like Celebrar los archivos, Encuentro de Ciencias de la Información del Mercosur, Reunión de Antropología del Mercosur and it has helped in the coordination and organization of the Jornadas de Territorios Culturales, Festival Ancestral y Contemporáneo and the Experiencia de Aulas Espejo between the National University of the Northeast (UNNE) and the University of Cundinamarca.

== Collections ==
=== Archive Collection ===
- Notes received: it contains information about the invitations for the artistic participation of the Chelaalapí Qom Choir and other institutions. Years 1994–2006.
- UNESCO prize, certificates: it contains participation forms of artisans in craftsmanship fairs, craftsmanship training certificates, certificates of training in Wichí culture and Qom language, of awards received by artisans from Chaco, among others. Years 1989–2004.
- Pamphlets: it contains the Cultural Center Leopoldo Marechal's biography, its origins, activities and also stories, myths, typical musical instruments of the Qom ethnic group and the localization of artisans in the Chaco Province.
- Various; it contains forms for projects, activities and contests by the Ministry of Culture and Education and by the Cultural and Artisanal Center Leopoldo Marechal. Years 1993–2000.
- Annual Memoirs: it contains summaries of the activities carried out by the province's cultural institutions (museums, archives, areas, directions and cultural centers). Years 1996–2006.
- Planning: it contains the planning carried out by cultural institutions. Years 2004–2007.
- Artisan records: it contains forms for the record of artisans from 29 localities of the Chaco Province with information about the activities they carry out, the tools they use, their techniques and raw materials required to carry them out. Years: 2001–2006.
- Budgets, certificates and administrative inquiries: it contains administrative documents with their resolution number, referring to meetings, authorizations and typical musical instruments, Cultural and Artisanal Cultural Center Leopoldo Marechal's certificates, and budgets from the Culture Under Secretary. Years 1994–2002.
- Maps: a cultural map of 29 Chaco Province's localities, which reflects the artisan's main activities according to the raw materials they use (clay, leather, fiber, pigment, wood, glass, bone, stone or metal). This document is part of an investigation carried out by the CDI. It encompasses the years 1999 to 2008.
- Craftsmanship: it consists of a 198 piece collection of handicrafts mostly made by Qom, Moqoit and Wichí artisans, separated by the material they were made with: clay, vegetal fibers, bone and wood.
- Audio-visual: it contains more than 3000 photos and videos about trips and investigations related to Indigenous peoples, donated by Esteban Zugasti, investigators from the Story Recompilation Project by Zafra, by the Choss Ph’anté Group and some are productions by the CDI.

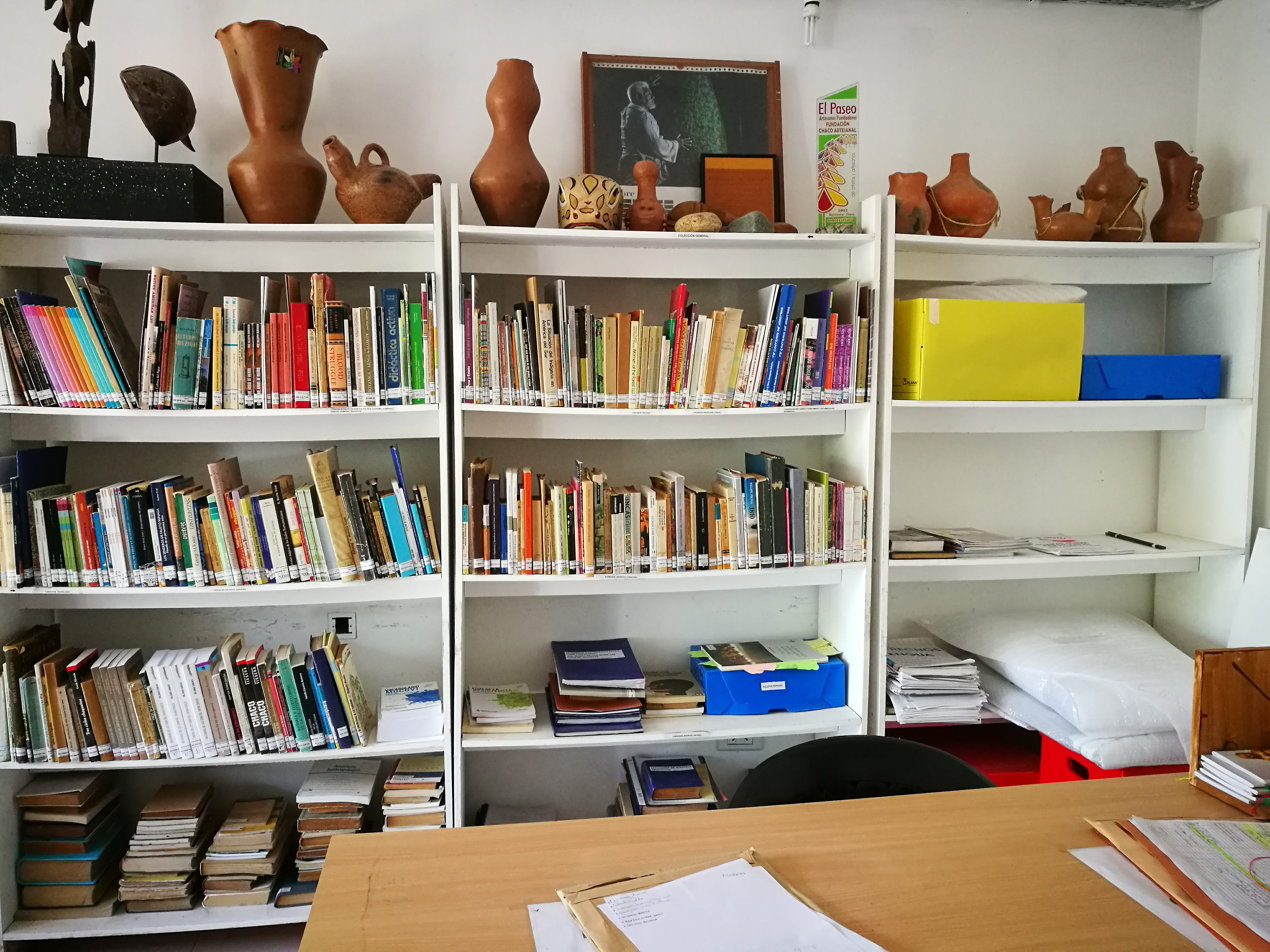
Library of the Indigenous Documentation Center No’lhametwet

=== Library Collection ===
- General collection: it contains over 1500 books about Indigenous peoples, in several languages (Spanish, English, Qom, Wichí, Moqoit, Mapuche and more).
- Their Own productions: Cultural Map of Indigenous Artisans from Chaco, Infographic about the Chelaalapí Qom Choir, Cultural Directory of institution which contain bibliographic material about Indigenous communities, photographic exhibitions (‘Ours’, ‘Customs’, ‘Indigenous Dance’), books (Natural Dyes, Wichí Stories).

== See also ==
- Indigenous intellectual property
- Indigenous people of Argentina
