= Thaïs Blume =

Spanish actress

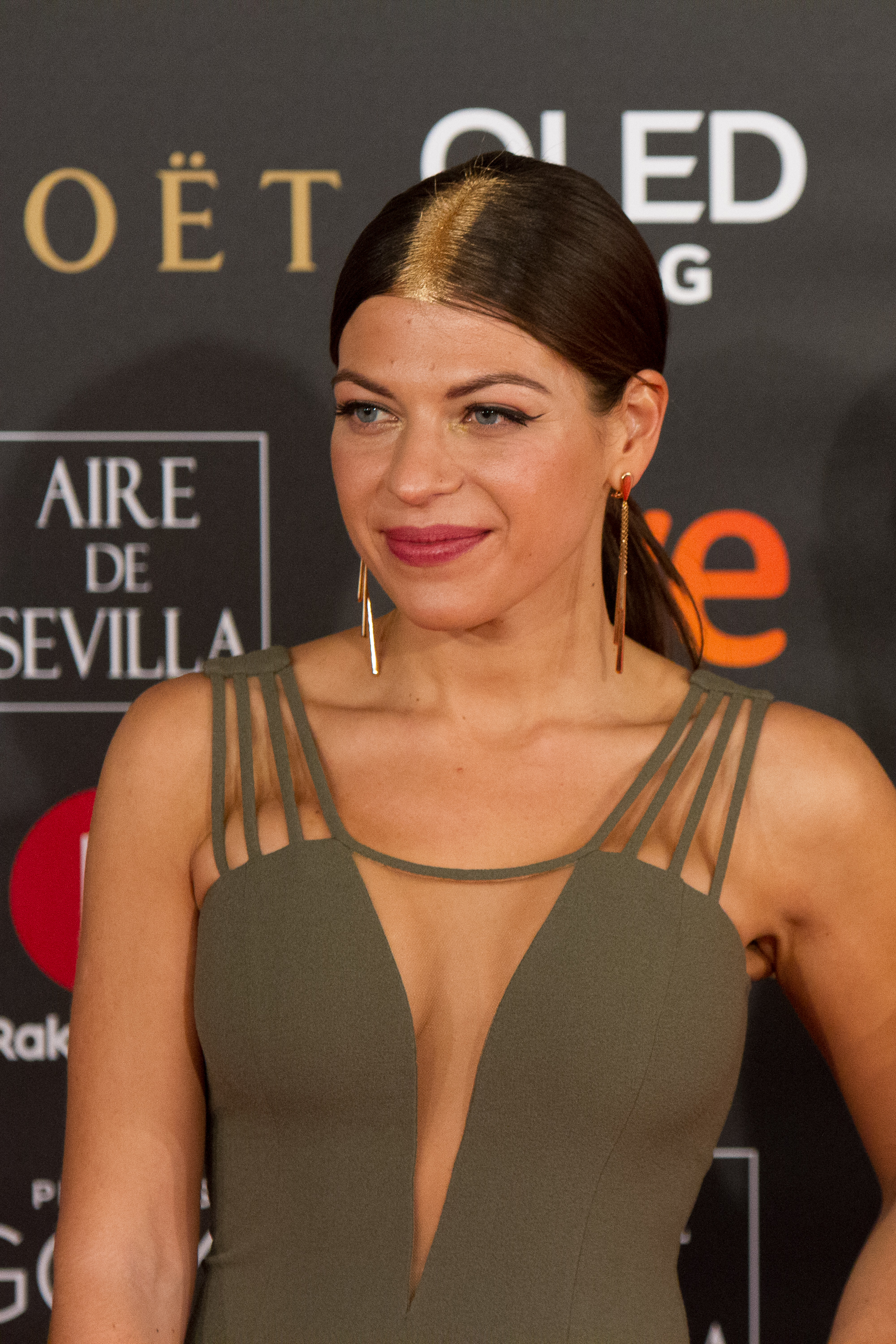
- At the 32nd Goya Awards in 2018
- Born: 19 September 1984 (age 41); Barcelona, Spain
- Occupation: Actress
- Years active: 2008–present

Thaïs Blume (born 19 September 1984) is a Spanish actress. She debuted on television in 2008 with Sin tetas no hay paraíso, and is also known for playing Mati on El Príncipe.

== Biography ==
The role that catapulted Thaïs Blume to fame was, practically, that of her debut. Between 2008 and 2009 she played Cristina on the Telecinco drama Sin tetas no hay paraíso. She put herself in the shoes of Cristina, an erotic film actress, during the three seasons that the series was broadcast.

In 2009 she starred in the film Luna Caliente with Eduard Fernández. It is an adaptation of the homonymous novel by Argentine writer Mempo Giardinelli directed by Vicente Aranda. In it, she played Ramona, a young woman who is immersed in an irrational mutual attraction with Juan (Fernández), a friend of her father who raped her.

In 2010 she returned to television with a leading role in the Cuatro series Valientes. Blume played Isabel in a story of drama and revenge, in which she shared scenes with Belinda Washington and Marta Milans among others.

A year later, at the end of this, the Barcelona actress joined the cast of the second season of the series Hispania, la leyenda, where she played Gaia, a young slave who has served the Sulpicio family throughout her life. Blume also appeared on the spinoff Imperium, playing the same character.

Also in 2011 Blume joined the cast of the second season of the TVE series Gran Reserva, where she played Lorena, a waitress who falls in love with Daniel Reverte (Ricard Sales). Blume made an appearance in the first chapter of the third season that served to close her participation in the series.

In 2012, the film 88 was shot, directed by the actor Jordi Mollà and starring Rubén Ochandiano and Beatriz Montañés.

In 2014 she made appearances in chapters of series such as Los misterios de Laura and Kubala, Moreno i Manchón. Also that year she joined the recurring cast of the TV3 series 39+1, where she played Paula, a young journalist of the magazine where the story is set. It is an adaptation of the homonymous novel by Catalan writer Sílvia Soler, in which she shared the screen with Agnès Busquets, Julio Manrique, and Silvia Abril among others.

Also in 2014 she joined the production of Telecino's El Príncipe, set in the Ceuta town of El Príncipe, a neighborhood of the city Príncipe Alfonso. Blume played Mati during the series' two seasons, an intelligent and brave policewoman who knows how to handle herself in a hostile world of men.

In 2016 she joined the fifth season of the after-dinner series Amar es para siempre, broadcast on Antena 3. There she played Nuria Salgado Sanz, a young lawyer who maintains a close relationship with Jaime Novoa Feijó (Javier Pereira).

== Television ==
- 2008–2009: Sin tetas no hay paraíso as Cristina Calleja on Telecinco
- 2010: Valientes as Isabel Gómez Acuña on Cuatro
- 2011: Hispania, la leyenda as Gaia on Antena 3
- 2011: Gran Reserva as Lorena on La 1
- 2012: Imperium as Gaia on Antena 3
- 2014: Los misterios de Laura as Irene (1 chapter) on La 1
- 2014–2016: El Príncipe as Matilde "Mati" Vila Colomer on Telecinco
- 2014–2015: 39+1 as Paula Nardi on TV3
- 2016–2017: Amar es para siempre, as Nuria Salgado Sanz on Antena 3
- 2018–present: Sabuesos as Paula Salcedo on La 1
- 2019: Promesas de arena as Berta on La 1.
- 2020–: Servir y proteger as Lidia Alonso.

== Film ==
- 2009: Luna Caliente by Vicente Aranda, as Ramona
- 2010: 88 by Jordi Mollá, as Thaïs
- 2026: Dreadful Mother
