= Nada es para siempre (TV series) =

Spanish television series

- Genre: Teen drama
- Created by: Carlos Cerutti; Alberto Giarrocco; Jose A. Méndez
- Based on: A todo corazón
- Starring: Daniel Diges; Carlos Castel; Aurora Carbonell; Pastora Vega; José Conde; Javier Pereira; Carola Baleztena; Ana Turpin; Vanesa Cabeza; Patricia Figón; Borja Vera; Lorena Voces; Natalia Represa; Manuel Lozano
- Opening theme: "Nada es para siempre" by Cómplices
- Country of origin: Spain
- Original language: Spanish
- No. of seasons: 2
- No. of episodes: 375

Original release
- Network: Antena 3
- Release: 5 July 1999 – 29 December 2000

Related
- A puro corazón

Nada es para siempre (transl. 'Nothing Lasts Forever') is a Spanish teen drama television series that originally aired on Antena 3 from July 1999 to December 2000. It is an adaptation of the Venezuelan telenovela A todo corazón.

== Premise ==
The plot tracks the vicissitudes of a group of highschoolers.

== Cast ==
- Daniel Diges as Gato.
- Carlos Castel as Adrián.
- Aurora Carbonell as Bárbara.
- Pastora Vega as Ana.
- José Conde as Ernesto.
- Javier Pereira as Zaqui.
- Carola Baleztena as Natalia.
- Ana Turpin as Cristina.
- Vanesa Cabeza as Patricia.
- Patricia Figón as Susana.
- Borja Vera as Max.
- Lorena Voces as Lorena.
- Natalia Represa as Laura.
- Manuel Lozano as Dani.
- Tomás Sáez as Palmero.
- Vanessa Saiz as Menchu.
- Inma Molina as Claudia.
- José María Aretxabala as Manu.
- Ana Carmen Sánchez as Nuria.

== Production ==
Consisting of an adaptation of the Venezuelan telenovela A todo corazón, the series was created by Carlos Cerutti, Alberto Giarrocco and Jose A. Méndez. The series was shot in A Coruña. The Colegio Obradoiro served to portray the fictional high school. The series' opening theme was performed by Cómplices.

The series premiered on Antena 3 on 5 July 1999, ending its broadcasting run in December 2000, after 2 seasons and 375 episodes. Laura Visconti, developing the A todo corazón's remake titled A puro corazón, also drew inspiration from the subplots of Nada es para siempre.
