= The Archangel's Feather =

2002 film

- Promotional release poster
- Directed by: Luis Manzo
- Written by: Juan Carlos Gené; César Sierra
- Produced by: Héctor Manrique; Alberto Arvelo; Martha Pabón; Pinto Luis
- Starring: Iván Tamayo
- Cinematography: Cezary Jaworski
- Edited by: Cachao Briceño
- Music by: Aquiles Báez
- Release date: 20 September 2002
- Running time: 92 minutes
- Country: Venezuela
- Language: Spanish

The Archangel's Feather (Spanish: La pluma del arcángel) is a 2002 Venezuelan magical realism drama film directed by Luis Manzo and written by Juan Carlos Gené and César Sierra. It was selected as the Venezuelan entry for the Best Foreign Language Film at the 75th Academy Awards, but it was not nominated.

== Cast ==
- Iván Tamayo as Gabriel Vilano
- Roque Valero as Lazarillo
- Elaiza Gil as Fina
- Alejo Felipe as Coronel
- Julio Mota as Hilario
- Martha Pabon as Flora
- Armando Gota as Father Lisardo

== Synopsis ==
In a small Andean village, messages from the outside world arrive only by telegraph, and the people live in fear of deadly orders sent by the country's dictator. A worldly new telegraph operator named Gabriel arrives and begins questioning the dictator's orders, sometimes to the point of outright altering the messages he is supposed to relay.

== Production ==
The film was adapted from a short story by Arturo Uslar Pietri.

Elaiza Gil, who for a time was romantically involved with Roque Valero, stated that they began their connection while co-stars in The Archangel's Feather.

== Reception ==
J.R. Jones in the Chicago Reader called the movie a "modest but fully realized" adaptation of Pietri's story, drawing from magical realism "in tone if not substance." Robert Koehler in Variety called the film "a studied approach to magical realism."

The Archangel's Feather was shown at international film festivals, including the 2003 Seattle International Film Festival and the 2003 Latin American Film Festival held at the AFI Silver Theatre. It was awarded Best Cinematography at the 4th Las Palmas de Gran Canaria International Film Festival.

Aquiles Báez, who composed the film's music, won his second of three Municipal Film Awards (Premios Municipal de Cine) in music for his work on the film.

== See also ==
- List of submissions to the 75th Academy Awards for Best Foreign Language Film
- List of Venezuelan submissions for the Academy Award for Best Foreign Language Film
