= Tess (band) =

Spanish pop band

- Origin: Spain
- Genres: Pop, Pop rock, R'n'B
- Instrument(s): Singing, Guitar
- Years active: 2000–2005; 2016–present
- Labels: Columbia (2000) Jive (2002) Warner Music (2004)
- Members: Úrsula Sebastián; Laura Pinto; Rosa López-Francos
- Past members: Elsa Pinilla

Tess is a Spanish pop band. They first appeared in 2000 in the youth series Al salir de clase. Originally the group was formed by members Elsa Pinilla, Laura Pinto and Úrsula Sebastián. However, in 2002 Úrsula left the band soon afterwards, originally saying that she wished to release her own album. Rosa López-Francos was announced as Úrsula's replacement, and the trio released two more studio albums. In 2005 they announced their official split, instead pursuing solo careers in music and cinema. In 2016, the band reunited but this time, without Elsa Pinilla who insisted to reunite without her as she would want to focus on her acting career and as well as pursue canine training.

== Discography ==
=== Albums ===
- (2000) A nuestra edad (Gold record)(Columbia/Sony Music)
- (2002) Quiero ser yo (Jive/BMG)
- (2004) Amor libre (WEA/Warner Music)

=== Singles ===
- (2000) "De carne y hueso"
- (2001) "Caramelos picantes"
- (2001) "Cuando te enamoras"
- (2002) "Quiero ser yo"
- (2002) "Todo es mentira"
- (2003) "En secreto"
- (2004) "Amor libre"
- (2004) "Maldita canción"
