= El Príncipe =

El Príncipe may refer to one of the following articles:

- Príncipe (Ceuta), a neighborhood in Ceuta, Spain
- The Prince, by Niccolò Machiavelli
- El Príncipe (José José album), a 1976 album by Mexican singer José José.
- El Príncipe (Cosculluela album), a 2009 album by Puerto Rican singer Cosculluela.
- El Príncipe (TV series)
- El Príncipe, Castle del Príncipe (Havana)
- The Prince (2019 film), by Chilean director Sebastián Muñoz.

El Príncipe is the nickname of a few football players:

- Enzo Francescoli
- Diego Milito
