= Pobre negro =

- Genre: Telenovela
- Created by: Rómulo Gallegos
- Written by: Gustavo Michelena; Alicia Cabrera
- Directed by: Luis Alberto Lamata
- Starring: Franklin Virgüez; Marlene Maseda
- Country of origin: Venezuela
- Original language: Spanish
- No. of episodes: 30

Production
- Executive producer: Gullillermo Lujan
- Producer: Henry Marquez

Original release
- Network: RCTV
- Release: 1989 – 1989

Pobre negro is a Venezuelan telenovela produced by RCTV in 1989 based on a novel of the same name written by Rómulo Gallegos. This version was adapted by Gustavo Michelena and starred Franklin Virgüez and Marlene Maseda.

== Plot ==
Pedro Miguel, referred to as "Negro Malo" is a slave working at a cocoa plantation in Venezuela in the 19th century and he gets into a stormy relationship with Ana Julia Alcorta, the daughter of the hacienda owner where he works. Within the framework of the forthcoming Federal War, and the future movement for the liberation of slaves, a story full of magic and hope unfolds, which tells us of the struggles against injustice and submission.

== Cast ==
- Franklin Virgüez as Negro Malo / Pedro Miguel Candelas
- Marlene Maseda as Luisana Alcorta
- Abby Raymond as Ana Julia Alcorta
- Gledys Ibarra as Encarnación
- Carlos Cámara Jr. as Cecilio Césperes "El Viejo"
- Hazel Leal as Candelaria
- Ignacio Navarro as Don Carlos Alcorta
- Carlos Villamizar as Rosendo Mediavilla
- Tomás Henríquez
- América Barrios
- Alberto Álvarez as Mendonga
- Jenny Noguera
- Pedro Marthan
- Elisa Escámez
- Lorenzo Henríquez
- Antonio Machuca
- Gisvel Ascanio
- Evelyn Berroterán
- Marco Antonio Casanova
- Estrella Castellanos
- Vladimir Torres
- Reina Hinojosa
- Diego Acuña
- Jose Cristancho
