= Elsa Pinilla Osuna =

Spanish singer-songwriter and actress

Elsa Pinilla
- Born: Elsa Pinilla Osuna; October 2, 1985 (age 40); Madrid, Spain
- Genres: Pop
- Occupations: Vocalist, songwriter, actress
- Years active: 1999–2005 (singer); 2000–present (actress)
- Formerly of: Tess

Elsa Pinilla Osuna (born October 2, 1985, in Madrid) is a Spanish singer-songwriter and actress.

She is the first of three children of María Osuna and the record producer Pablo Pinilla. She has studied several performing arts, mainly ballet, piano playing, singing, and acting.

From an early age, she has taken part in several TV advertisements and fashion shows. In 1999 she won the El Corte Inglés 'Photographic Model' contest. She's also appeared on album covers of some Spanish bands and featured in David DeMaría's music videos Sin miedo a perder and El perfume de la soledad.

In 2004, she was one of the hosts of the Spanish music TV program Musica Uno.

She was a founder, songwriter and member of the music group Tess, along with Úrsula Sebastián and Laura Pinto.

As an actress, she began playing 'Elsa' in the successful Spanish TV series Al salir de clase (2000) along with the other members of Tess, which helped them promote their first album. She also played one of the lost girls in the Spanish musical Peter Pan (2002–2003). In 2006, Elsa moved for a year and a half to Argentina, where she played 'Marilyn' in the TV series Alma Pirata and 'Barbara' in Romeo y Julieta.

In 2007, she decided to go back to her native Spain and continue there her career as an actress, appearing at some episodes of the TV series Cuestión de sexo and Sin tetas no hay paraíso.

In 2008, she appears in the Antena 3 two-episode TV film about Marisol, playing the role of the former actress in her teenage years.

At the beginning of 2009, she plays the role of Susana in the Spanish TV series Dieciocho.
