= Desnudo con Naranjas =

1995 Venezuelan film

- Film poster
- Directed by: Luis Alberto Lamata
- Starring: Lourdes Valera; Daniel Alvarado; Carlos Mata; Pedro Durán; Gonzalo Cubero; Luis Fernández
- Release date: 1995
- Country: Venezuela
- Language: Spanish

Desnudo con Naranjas (English: Naked with Oranges) is a 1995 Venezuelan film directed by Luis Alberto Lamata and starring Lourdes Valera, Daniel Alvarado, Carlos Mata, Pedro Durán, Gonzalo Cubero and Luis Fernández.

== Plot ==
Loosely based on Robert Louis Stevenson's short story "The Bottle Imp" and an old folk legend from Barlovento. During Venezuela's Federal War, an indigenous deserter from the liberal army and a mysterious white woman, mute and traumatized by the war, will live a strange and violent love story. On their way, they come across a magical amulet, the "bilongo", which grants its owner fortune in games of chance in exchange for a terrible price that the last owner must pay. Willing to snatch a few moments of happiness from life, they try to escape from the inevitable.

== Cast ==
- Lourdes Valera .... Margarita/ Doña Matilde
- Daniel Alvarado.... Captain
- Carlos Mata....Bachelor Agustin Guzman
- Alexander Milic...Turco Durbayán
- Luis Fernández....Samuel Jhonson
- Pedro Durán....Cupo
- Manuel Salazar....General
- Paul Fellermeier
- Erick Noriega
- Gonzalo Cubero
- Martin Antigua
- María Luisa Lamata
- Javier Paredes
- Pedro Renteria.... Colonel
- Freddy Salazar
- Roger Herrera
- Jose Eloy Sanchez
- Soraya Sanz
- Carmen Landaeta

== Awards ==
- Venezuelan Film Festival: Best Direction, Best Screenplay, Best Cinematography.
- National Award "Casa del Artista", Venezuela.
- Native American Film Festival, New Mexico, USA: Best Film.
- Biarritz Film Festival, France: Best Actor (Daniel Alvarado).
- Sochi International Film Festival, Russia: Best Actor.
- Trieste Festival, Italy: Best Music.
