= Luis Alberto Lamata =

Venezuelan film director (1959–2025)

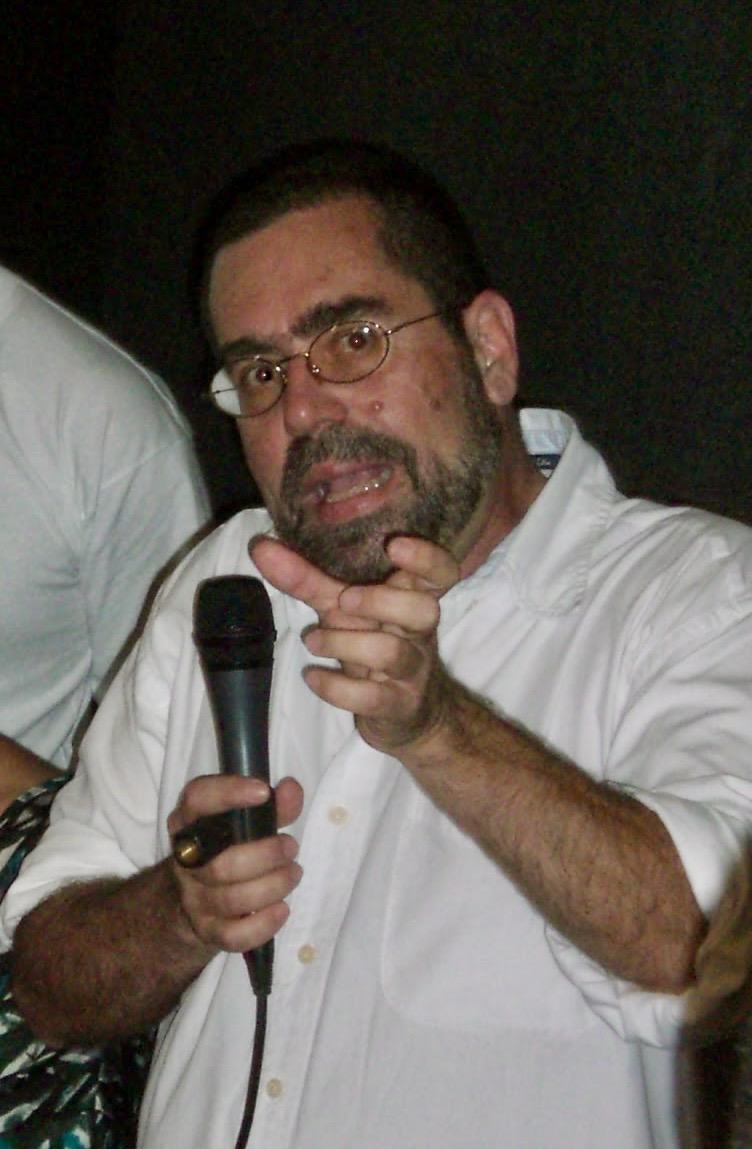
- Lamata in 2010
- Born: Luis Alberto Lamata Bethencourt; 4 November 1959; Caracas, Venezuela
- Died: 24 August 2025 (aged 65)
- Education: Central University of Venezuela
- Occupations: Film director; producer; writer; historian
- Years active: 1982–2025
- Spouse: Lourdes Valera
- Parents: María del Rosario Betancor; Juan Lamata
- Awards: National Film Award of Venezuela

Luis Alberto Lamata Bethencourt (4 November 1959 – 24 August 2025) was a Venezuelan film director, producer, writer and historian.

== Early life and career ==
Lamata studied history at the Central University of Venezuela (UCV) and was involved in film since 1982. In 1984, he directed the short film Félix o ¿sabe usted cuánto gana un cajero? and the soap opera Topacio, which was a huge success both domestically and internationally. He alternated his work in film as assistant director on Carlos Rebolledo's Profesión vivir (1985) and as advisor to Carlos Azpúrua on the documentary Amazonas, el negocio de este mundo (1986) with new soap operas: Mansión de Lujo (1986), La intrusa (1987), Señora (1988), Pobre negro (1989), and Gardenia (1990).

In 1991, he released his first feature film, Jericho, set during the Christianization of Venezuela in the 16th century, which was selected to represent Venezuela at the Oscars for Best Foreign Language Film, was also nominated for the Goya Awards for Best Spanish Language Foreign Film and won an award at the Biarritz Film Festival. He continued to make soap operas and would not direct another feature film until 1996, when he directed the war drama Desnudo con Naranjas (Naked with Oranges), screened at the Sundance Film Festival. His third feature film would not come until 2007, when he directed Miranda regresa (Miranda Returns), which won the Audience Award in Venezuela. Afterwards he directed El enemigo (2008), which won an award at the Trieste Film Festival; Taita Boves (2010), which won an award at the Mérida Film Festival; Bolívar, el hombre de las dificultades (2013) and Parque Central (2018).

== Personal life and death ==
Lamata was the son of María del Rosario Betancor and soap opera director Juan Lamata Martín, and nephew of actress María Luisa Lamata Martín. He was married to actress Lourdes del Valle Valera.

Lamata died on 24 August 2025, at the age of 65.

== Filmography ==
=== Films ===
- 1991: Jericho
- 1996: Desnudo con Naranjas
- 1997: Salserín
- 2007: Miranda regresa
- 2008: El enemigo
- 2010: Taita Boves
- 2013: Azú
- 2013: Bolívar, Man of Difficulties
- 2018: Parque Central

=== Television ===
- 1984: Topacio
- 1986: Mansion de Luxe
- 1987: La intrusa
- 1988: Señora
- 1989: Pobre negro
- 1990: Gardenia
- 1992: Las dos Dianas
- 1992: El paseo de la gracia de Dios
- 1998: Enséñame a querer
- 1999: Calypso
- 2001–2002: Soledad
- 2003: La hija del jardinero
- 2004: Belinda
- 2008: La vida entera
- 2011: El árbol de Gabriel
- 2015: A puro corazón
