= Dreadful Mother =

2026 Spanish horror film

- Theatrical release poster
- Spanish: La mala madre
- Directed by: Alicia Albares
- Produced by: Paloma Mora; Alberto Díaz
- Starring: Thaïs Blume; Alex Gadea; Javier Pereira
- Cinematography: Gabo Guerra
- Edited by: Vicente Ibáñez; Ernesto Arnal
- Music by: Marina Ortega Mira
- Production companies: Mordisco Films; Admirable Films
- Release date: 9 October 2026 (Sitges)
- Running time: 88 minutes
- Country: Spain
- Language: Spanish

Dreadful Mother (Spanish: La mala madre) is an upcoming Spanish psychological horror film directed by Alicia Albares in her directorial debut. Starring Thaïs Blume it follows Victoria, who wakes up with a broken arm in a country house where she has been kidnapped.

It premiered in Panorama section on 9 October 2026 at the 59th Sitges Film Festival.

== Synopsis ==
The film follows Victoria, a woman who wakes up injured and confused in an isolated mansion with no memory of how she arrived there. A doctor and a nun care for her, claiming that she is recovering from a serious accident that killed her daughter. However, Victoria gradually realizes that she is being held against her will. As she searches for answers, she uncovers disturbing secrets involving her daughter, abductions and murders.

== Cast ==
- Thaïs Blume
- Alex Gadea
- Javier Pereira
- Marina Alegre
- Mariana Cordero
- Lluna Aldasoro
- Jordi Aguilar
- Domenec de Guzman
- Àngel Fígols

== Production ==
In 2022, the film was selected at the fourth edition of Fantastic 7 held jointly by Sitges International Fantastic Film Festival and Marché du Film and run at 2022 Cannes Film Festival.

The film project received the Estudios GGM Award and the Cinematic Media Award at the Guadalajara Co‑Production Meeting, and it also won first prize at the Alicante Film Festival.

The film produced by Admirable Films and Mordisco Films began principal photography in June 2025 and was shot over six weeks at locations in Moncada, Spain, Paterna, and Serra, Spain, in the Valencian Community.

In 2026, the film was presented by Latido Films at the Cannes Film Market, an annual marketplace for films held in conjunction with 2026 Cannes Film Festival.

== Release ==
Dreadful Mother premiered in Panorama section on 9 October 2026 at the 59th Sitges Film Festival.

Madrid sales company Latido Films acquired the international sales rights of the film.
