= Raymond Maufrais =

French journalist and explorer

Raymond Maufrais (1 October 1926, Toulon – 13 January 1950) was a French journalist and explorer. He disappeared in the jungle of French Guiana; his body was never found. A court in French Guiana in 2026 declared he had died 13 January 1950, the date of his last entry in his journal.

== Biography ==
=== Youth ===
Raymond Maufrais was born in Toulon, an only child. His parents were forced frequently to send the boy away from a young age, starting when he was nine. With two comrades he climbed the wall of the children's home they lived in in the Var department; the police spent three days looking for them. He attended Rouvière school in Toulon in October 1939, where he showed promise in French and classical literature. By 1940 his father was a prisoner in Germany.

In 1942, having listened to the BBC broadcasts, he decided to flee to England but an accident in Dieppe prevented his flight and by August had returned to Toulon. He played a minor part in the French resistance, distributing newspapers, writing graffiti, and reporting troop movements. His father had, in fact, joined the resistance in June 1942, leading a group of the Armée secrète. He later joined the maquis in Périgord and worked with his father preparing landings in Provence; he was awarded the Croix de guerre 1939–1945 (with bronze star) and the Medal of French Gratitude, before he even turned 18. After liberation he joined the army, first as a war correspondent and then as a paratrooper, but finished his service before being called up. He then worked as a correspondent in Corsica, Italy, and along the Côte d’Azur.

=== Expedition in Brazil ===
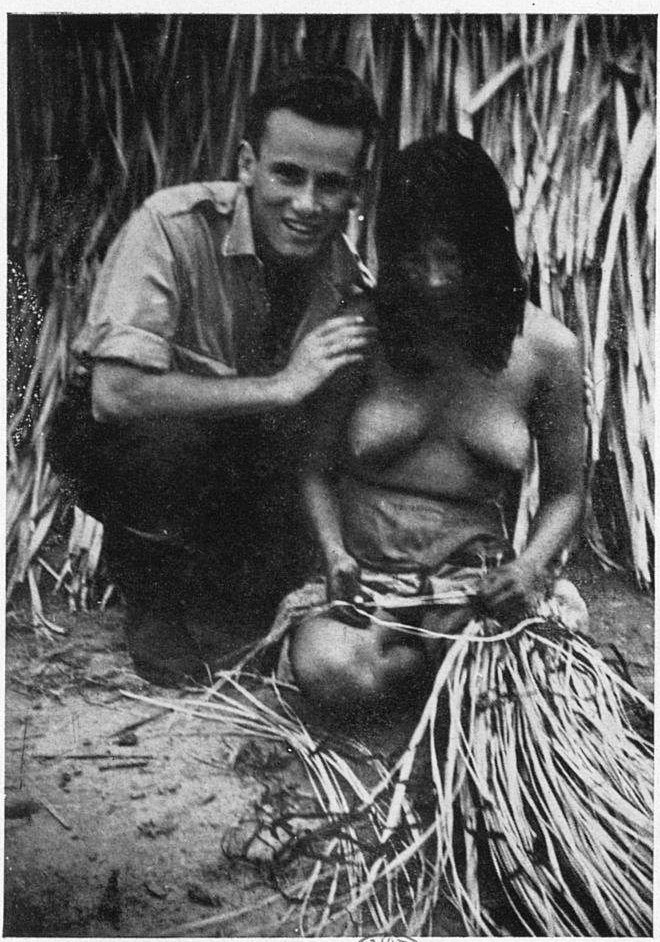
Picture from "Aventures au Matto Grosso", 1951. Raymond Maufrais and a young Amerindian.

In July 1946 Maufrais left for Brazil. While in Rio de Janeiro he made a bet with an editor of the Brazilia Herald that he would go and investigate some unexplored area in the heart of Brazil. He met an Italian countess who managed to get him signed on to a "pacification" mission to the Xavante people who live in Mato Grosso and were, reportedly, very hostile toward strangers. Having traveled 2700 kilometers and found the remains of another expedition, the group was forced to retreat after being attacked by the natives.

=== Expedition in French Guiana ===
In 1947 Maufrais returned to France to edit the manuscript he had been working on, for a book to be called Aventures au Matto-Grosso, which was not published until after his death, and gave public lectures in Toulon and elsewhere. He also announced a new project: to travel from French Guiana to Brazil by way of the (remote and inaccessible) Tumuk Humak Mountains, and then to descend the Rio Jari to Belém—alone and on foot. His goal, as he later stated in his journals, was to find three tribes of cannibals and survivors of 51 tribes which had not been heard from in sixty years. At the time there was a strong belief in Cayenne that the southern parts of French Guiana bordering on Brazil harbored many unknown tribes; later investigations showed that the area was uninhabited. Maufrais intended to investigate. He left in June 1949, having secured an advance payment from the magazine Sciences et Voyages for writing travel reports.

He debarked in Cayenne and wrote articles on such subjects as the leper colony of Acarouany, the former workers of the bagnes, the coastal Kalina people, and the gold seekers. In September he joined a geological expedition and went inland, up the Mana River. During that journey Maufrais jumped in the water after a wounded caiman and killed it with a knife. He reached Maripasoula on 25 October, where he was held up for three weeks by the rains.

In Grigel he was given an abandoned canoe which turned out to be unusable. Having no money, he bought no supplies, thinking he would be able to live on what he hunted. He began walking accompanied by his dog Bobby, with a backpack so heavy he divided his load in half and would walk a kilometer with one half, then drop that and return for the other half. He wrote a daily journal, which tells of his troubles—he frequently lost the way, found practically nothing to eat, suffered from dysentery, and constantly fought a hostile forest. He was forced to eat lizards, snails, birds, and seeds. On 1 January 1950, completely exhausted and unable to even fire his gun, he reached the Tamouri and the little settlement Claude where he found only abandoned buildings. He was delirious, and finally killed Bobby and ate him.

He was forced to accept that he could not stick to his original travel plan and set off downriver for the closest village, the creole village of Bienvenue, at 70 kilometers. An attempt to build a raft failed (it fell apart, waterlogged), so instead he intended to wade downstream and then, after being rested and re-equipped, to return upstream and continue his journey. On 13 January, he left all his notes and photo equipment in a bag in a hut, keeping only a little bag with necessities and his machete. He got into the water and disappeared in the rapids, never to be seen again. Evidence found later suggested he managed to travel another thirty-five miles.

At the end of February or the beginning of March, a man from the Emerillon people traveled on the river Tampok, and passed through the Claude settlement where he found Maufrais's belongings. It was not until 6 July that the press agency of Suriname reported the news of Maufrais's disappearance. The news was picked up by the French press, and the affaire Maufrais was started, fed by a stream of articles, hypotheses, and controversies.

=== The father's search ===
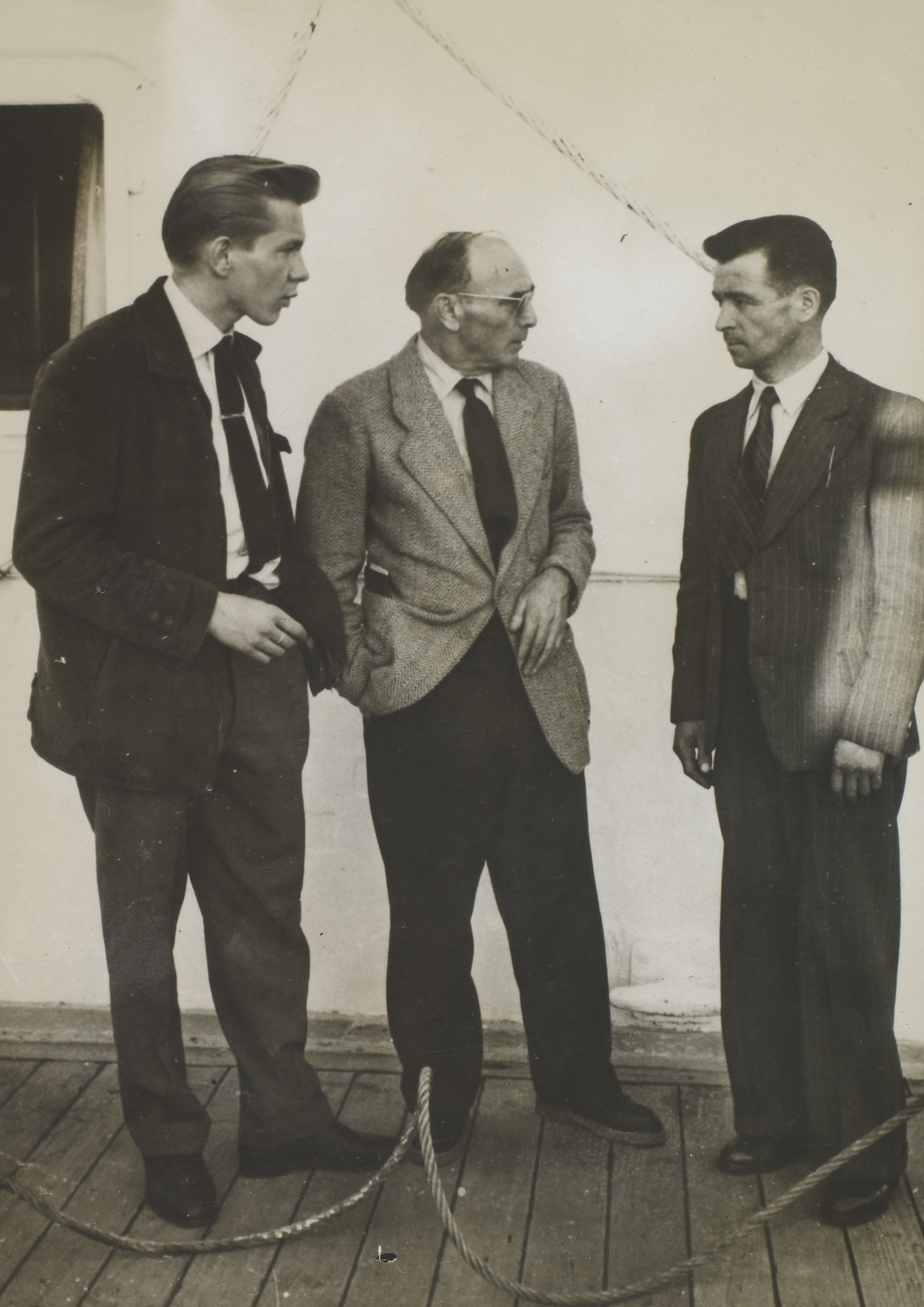
Edgard Maufrais in Brazil to search for his son.

Maufrais' father, Edgar, began looking for his son in 1952; he left his wife behind in Toulon. He traveled twelve thousand kilometers in twelve years. He paid for his search by publishing his son's diaries (he also published his own book, À la recherche de mon fils, published by Éditions Julliard). By chance, a television crew from Réseau Outre-Mer 1re found him in Maripasoula in 1961, nine years into his fruitless search, and interviewed him. Afterward they also interviewed his wife back in Toulon. He returned to Toulon in June 1964, exhausted; he died ten years later. His wife slowly lost her mind and died in an asylum in Toulon in 1984.

== Legacy ==
Dozens of books have been written on Maufrais, and he was the subject of four French films, most recently a 2015 production by Jérémy Banster starring Stany Coppet, who also co-wrote the film. His Aventures en Guyane is still in print.

== See also ==
- List of people who disappeared mysteriously: 1910–1990

=== Books ===
- Bonaccorsi, Robert (2006). À propos de Raymond Maufrais. Toulon: Bleu outre-mers. ISBN 2-9523571-9-6.
- Cavalier, Jacques (1996). Aventures au cœur de la Guyane: Un hommage à Raymond Maufrais. Scripta. ISBN 978-2910870058.
- Chapelle, Richard (1969). J'ai vécu l'enfer de Raymond Maufrais. Paris: Flammarion.
- Crunelle, Geoffroi (1989). Raymond Maufrais: L'Appel de l'Aventure. Paris: éditions Caribéennes.
- Crunelle, Geoffroi (2015). Raymond Maufrais: La véritable histoire du héros du film La vie pure. Jouaville: Scripta.
- Crunelle, Geoffroi (2006). Raymond Maufrais: Aventures au Brésil et en Guyane. Lanrodec: Scripta.
- Joffroy, Pierre (1956). Dévorante Amazonie: la grande aventure des Maufrais. Paris: A. Fayard.
- Maufrais, Edgar (1956). À la recherche de mon fils. Paris: R. Julliard.
- Renoux, Jean-André; Ricatte, René. La Vérité sur la mort de Raymond Maufrais. Paris: Éditions France-Empire.
- Thomas, Paul (2012). À la poursuite de l'impossible (2 ed.). Scripta. ISBN 9782910870270.
- Thouvenot, Daniel (2010). Amazonie, l'enfer en partage: il y a soixante ans, la tragédie des Maufrais. Toulon: les Presses du Midi. ISBN 978-2-8127-0170-2.

=== Films ===
- Voyage au bout de la vie, dir. Philippe Jamain; Les Films de la vallée, 1994, 26 min
- Raymond l’intrépide. Le destin tragique des Maufrais, dir. Christian Philibert; VBC Production, 2000, 52 min
- Au nom du fils, dir. Philippe Jamain; Aber images, Les Films de la vallée, 2003, 52 min
- La vie pure, dir. Jérémy Banster, 2015.
