= Jericho (1991 film) =

1991 film

- Film poster
- Directed by: Luis Alberto Lamata
- Written by: Luis Alberto Lamata
- Starring: Cosme Cortázar
- Release date: 9 October 1991
- Running time: 90 minutes
- Country: Venezuela
- Language: Spanish

Jericho (Spanish: Jericó) is a 1991 Venezuelan historical drama film directed by Luis Alberto Lamata. The film was selected as the Venezuelan entry for the Best Foreign Language Film at the 64th Academy Awards, but was not accepted as a nominee.

== Plot ==
In the 16th century, Santiago, a Dominican friar, is the only survivor of an expedition that set out in search of the mythical South Seas under the direction of the cruel Gazcuña. Thanks to his Christian faith and his missionary ardor, he was integrated among the Caribbean Indians, until, after an incident with the chief of the tribe, he was forced to flee with his wife and son. He is arrested by the Spanish soldiers and accused of being a heretic, which means Inquisition and torture. But the real secret that the mercenaries want to extract from him is the place where Gazcuña has hidden 30,000 pesos in gold.

== Cast ==
- Cosme Cortázar as Priest Santiago
- Francis Rueda as Priest's sister
- Alexander Milic as Spanish conqueror

== See also ==
- List of submissions to the 64th Academy Awards for Best Foreign Language Film
- List of Venezuelan submissions for the Academy Award for Best Foreign Language Film
