= Carola Baleztena =

Spanish actress

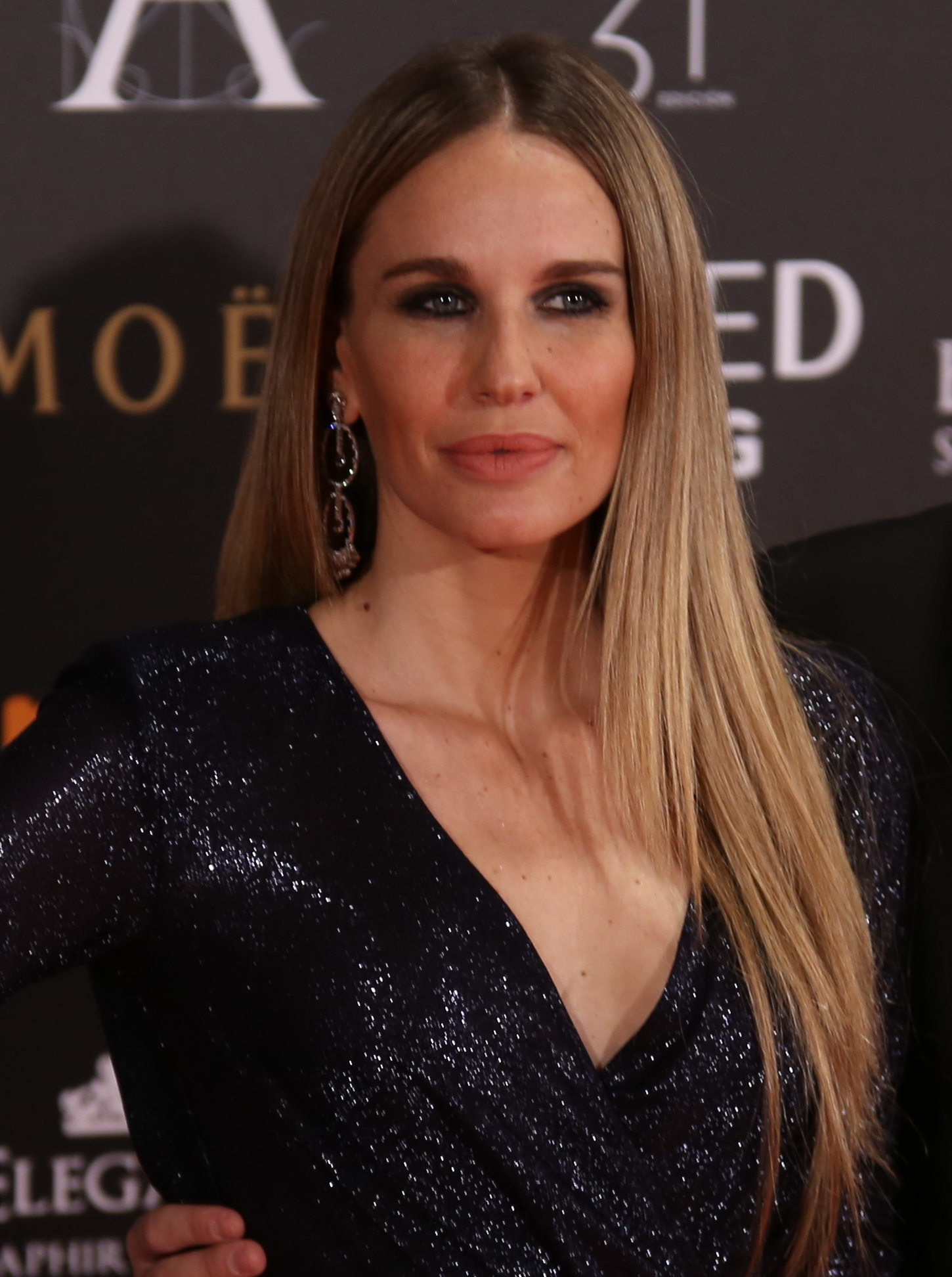
- Born: 10 January 1980 (age 45); Madrid, Spain
- Occupation(s): actress and TV presenter

Carola Baleztena (10 January 1980, Madrid) is a Spanish actress.

Her most notable role was playing Natalia, the protagonist of the youth soap opera Nada es para siempre (1999-2000).

She is the granddaughter of Navarrese folk customs expert Ignacio Baleztena Ascárate.

== Personal life ==
She married in 2011 with a businessman whom she had 2 daughters, they later divorced. In 2016 she married jeweler Emiliano Suárez.

== Filmography ==
=== Television ===
- Menudo es mi padre (1997).
- Fernández y familia (199]), as Marta.
- Nada es para siempre (1999-2000), as Natalia.
- Paraíso (2000-2001).
- Al salir de clase (2001-2002) as Lucía.
- Luna negra (2003-200]), as Maite Padilla.
- El inquilino (2004), 4 episodes.
- El comisario (2005), 2 episodes, as Isa.
- Planta 25 (2006-2008), as Irene.
- Yo soy Bea (2008-2009), many episodes.
- Filmaniac (2010-2014), as host
- Ver cine (2014-present), as host

=== Cine ===
- Diario de una becaria (2003), as Beatriz.
- El chocolate del loro (2004), as Sobrina.
- Torrente 3: El protector (2005), como Araceli.
- Las tierras altas (2008), as Julia.
