= A todo corazón =

Television series

- Genre: Telenovela
- Created by: Laura Visconti
- Written by: César Sierra; Ana Teresa Sosa; Carlos Cerutti
- Directed by: Luis Manzo
- Music by: Isaías Urbina
- Country of origin: Venezuela
- Original language: Spanish
- No. of episodes: 120

Production
- Executive producers: Alberto Giarroco; Miguel Ángel Villasmil; Carlos Cerutti
- Editor: Omar Sabino
- Camera setup: Multi-camera

Original release
- Network: Venevisión
- Release: July 15, 1997 – May 8, 1998

Related
- Nada es para siempre; A puro corazón

A todo corazón is a Venezuelan drama telenovela created by Laura Visconti and written by César Sierra and Ana Teresa Sosa for Venevisión. The series follows the life and problems facing young high school students. This telenovela marked the debut of Gaby Espino, Adrián Delgado, Lourdes Martínez and Juan Alfonso Baptista. In 2015 Televen made the remake of the telenovela, titled A puro corazón, which had nothing more to do with Adrián Delgado as Cristóbal Ortega.

== Plot ==
The series tells the adventures and misadventures in the life of some adolescents of secondary. Everything happens in a private school, the street, their respective homes, the soda fountain and other meeting points. Although the plot usually focuses on its protagonists, Adrián (Adrián Delgado) and Patricia (Lourdes Martínez). Where Patricia lives eternally in love with Adrián, but he unexpectedly falls in love with Natalia (Gabriela Espino), a rich girl who arrives at the school in the last year.

== Cast ==
- Adrián Delgado as Adrián Rodríguez
- Lourdes Martínez as Patricia Gutiérrez
- Gabriela Espino as Natalia Aristeguieta
- Juan Alfonso Baptista as Elías Mujica / El Gato
- Betty Cabrera as Jessica Iturriza
- Yessi Gravano as Lorena Sánchez
- Mónica López as Carlota Torres Aristigueta
- Lissange Belisario as Claudia Pérez
- Yerling Hostos as Coraima López
- Zywia Castrillo as Laura Palmero
- Víctor Hugo Gómes as Leonardo Ramón Gutiérrez
- Roger Teixeira as Tony Castillo
- Daniela Alvarado as Melissa Rodríguez
- Angélica Herrera as Maricarmen Pérez
- Héctor Moreno as Manuel Antonio Arismendi
- Roque Valero as Máximo Palmero
- Cecilia Villarreal as María Cristina de Aristiguieta
- Esperanza Magaz as Fátima Pérez
- Raúl Xiqués as Professor Emiliano Ortega
- Fernando Flores as Director Perfecto Aguirre
- Juan Manuel Montesinos as José Ramón Gutiérrez
- Rodolfo Drago as Ernesto Rodríguez
- Esther Orjuela as Ana Cecilia
- Martha Pabón as Olga
- Amilcar Rivero as Tiburcio Pérez
- Luis Alberto de Mozos as Reinaldo Aristiguieta
- Mimi Sills as Profesora Irene Ortiz
