= Roque Valero =

Venezuelan singer, actor and politician (born 1974)

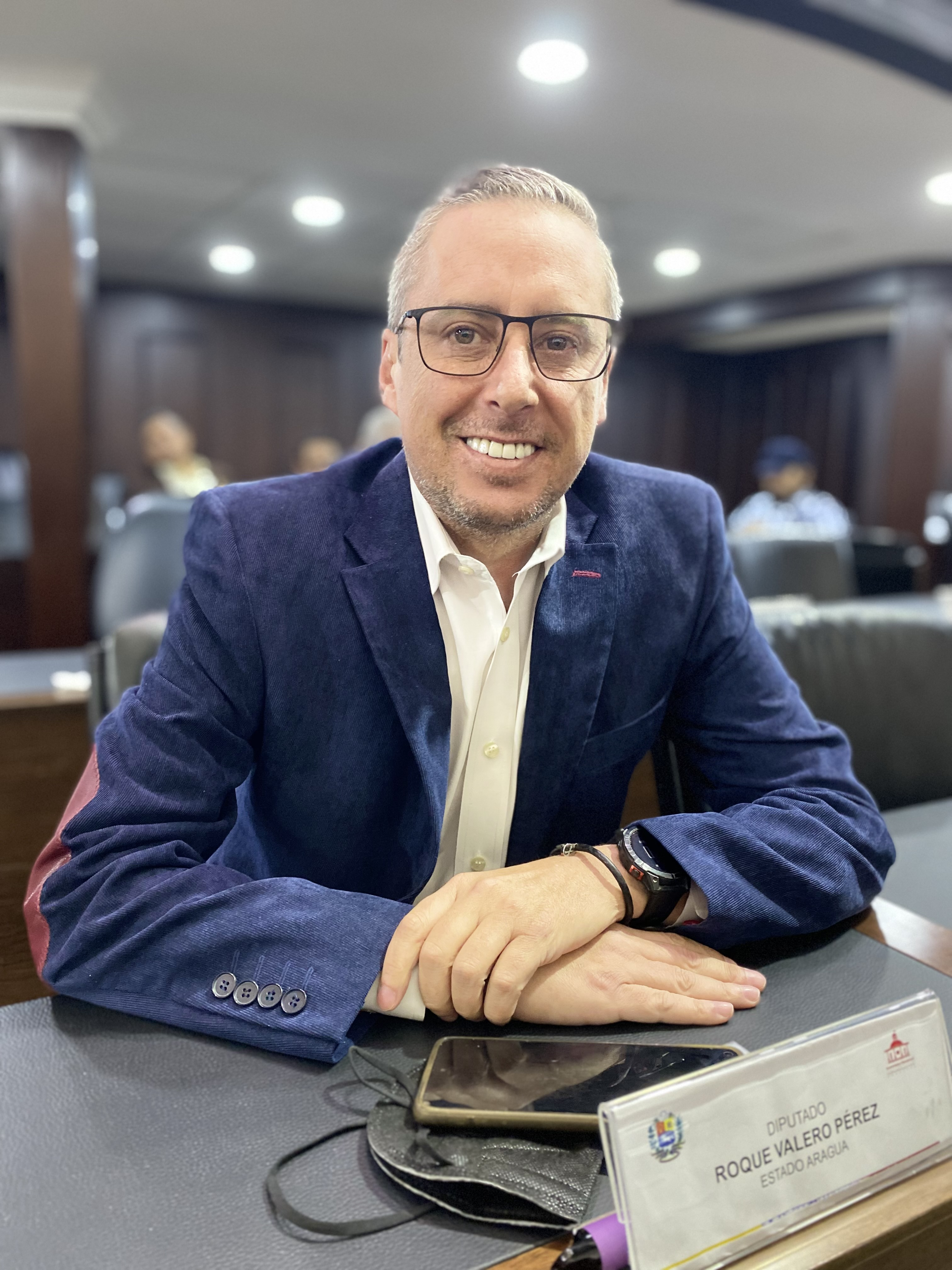
- Valero in 2022

Member of the 2017 Constituent National Assembly
- In office 4 August 2017 – 31 December 2020

Member of the National Assembly
- In office 3 August 2016 – 30 July 2017
- Constituency: Aragua State

Personal details
- Born: Roque Valero Pérez; 31 January 1974 (age 52) Caracas, Venezuela
- Party: PSUV
- Occupation: Singer; actor; politician
- Years active: 1995–present
- Musical career
- Genre: Latin Pop
- Instrument: Vocals
- Labels: Sony BMG; Latin World; IC Records

Roque Valero Pérez (born 31 January 1974) is a Venezuelan singer, actor and politician. A member of the United Socialist Party of Venezuela (PSUV), he served as Member of the National Assembly for Aragua State from 2016 to 2017, and also served as a Member of the 2017 Constituent National Assembly from 2017 to 2020.

== Biography ==
Roque was born to parents Roque Valero and Rosario Pérez. He began singing at the age of 7 when he joined the cast of a school play titled El día del médico.

In 1983, his family moved to Barquisimeto where he took courses in acting and joined the National youth Orchestra of Lara. His acting coach recommended that he pursue acting further, and he then moved to Caracas to strengthen his acting skills. He studied in several acting workshops under Ricardo Lombardi and Adda Noceti of Grupo Actoral 80 and with Santiago Sánchez. his first acting job was in theater in a play titled La mano written by Oscar Mendoza Herrera.

== Career ==
=== Film and television actor ===
In 2002, Valero got the opportunity to star in his first feature film titled La pluma del arcángel written by Luis Manzo. The film won awards and nominations at film festivals in Bogotá, Cartagena and Miami. Later, he returned to television with a supporting role in the Cosita Rica as a composer and performer of its musical theme which was included in his first album titled Cae El Amor released in 2004.

That same year, he starred with Édgar Ramírez in the film Punto y Raya by Elia Schneider, for which he won the best actor award at the Gramado Festival, the Golden Sun (Soleil d'Or) as well as Best Actor in the International Festival of Latin American Cinema of Biarritz, and the Special Jury Prize Award Coral 26vo male performance in the International Festival of New Latin American Cinema in Havana, Cuba.

In 2006, he obtained his first starring role in the telenovela titled Ciudad Bendita where he sang several songs, including the theme song that were included in his second album Todo Va A Salir Bien which was also certified gold and platinum. In 2007 he accompanied Franco De Vita on tour in Colombia and the United States.

He won the Teatro Municipal Award for Best Actor.

In 2008 starred alongside Armando Cabrera and Fabiola Colmenares the musical work of Mel Brooks, The Producers in the Aula Magna of the Universidad Central de Venezuela.

=== Politics ===
Valero was elected as a deputy to the Venezuelan National Assembly for the state of Aragua until 2017, when he became part of the National Constituent Assembly.

Valero also serves as the President of the Venezuela-Serbia Parliamentary Friendship Group.

== Discography ==
- 2004: Cae El Amor
- 2006: Todo Va A Salir Bien
- 2008: Pasajeros En Tránsito
- 2010: Recopilatorio: Insomnio

== Telenovela soundtracks ==
1. Nuestra Historia in Cosita Rica (2003)
2. Ando de Puntillas in Cosita Rica (2003)
3. Vengo a Contar Contigo in Sabor a ti (2004)
4. En tú Corazón in El amor las vuelve locas (2005)
5. Ciudad Bendita in Ciudad Bendita (2006)
6. Cuando te Miro in Ciudad Bendita (2006)
7. Las Lágrimas Aprenden a Reír (Creo en Ti) in La vida entera (2008)
8. No soy nada (A duo con Yordano) in La vida entera (2008)
9. Contra Corriente in Natalia del Mar (2011)

== Filmography ==
=== Telenovelas ===
- Ilusiones (1995)
- La Inolvidable (1996)
- A todo corazón (1997)
- Mujercitas (1999)
- Felina (2001) as Agapito
- Lejana como el viento (2002) as Tony
- Cosita Rica (2003) as Cachito
- Se solicita príncipe azul (2005) as Bautista
- Con toda el alma (2005) as Professor Hugo
- Ciudad Bendita (2006) as Juan Lobo
- La vida entera (2008) as Miky Mata
- El árbol de Gabriel (2011) as Epicureo Morales

=== Films ===
- La pluma del arcángel (2002) as Lazarillo
- Punto y Raya (2004) as Cheito
- Bolívar, el hombre de las dificultades (2013) as Bolívar
- Allende en su laberinto (2014)
