= Bolívar, Man of Difficulties =

- Film poster
- Spanish: Bolívar, el hombre de las dificultades
- Directed by: Luis Alberto Lamata
- Release date: August 16, 2013
- Country: Venezuela
- Language: Spanish

Bolívar, Man of Difficulties (Spanish: Bolívar, el hombre de las dificultades) is a 2013 Venezuelan biographical drama film directed by Luis Alberto Lamata. The film is based in the obstacles that Simón Bolívar had to face in 1815 and 1816. It stars Roque Valero, who plays Bolívar.

== Cast ==
- Roque Valero as Simón Bolívar.
- Jorge Reyes as El Polaco.
- Juvel Vielma as Santiago Mariño.
- Alberto Alifa as José Antonio Páez.
- Camila Arteche as Madame Jeanne Bourvil.
- Samantha Dagnino as Josefina Machado, or "La Señorita Pepa".
- Paula Woyzechowsky as Madame Julienne.
- Rafael Gil as Felipe Luis Brión.
- Gilbert Laumord as Alexandre Petion.
- Daniel Rodríguez Cegarra as José Francisco Bermúdez.
- Carlos Enrique Almirante as Pedro Amestoy.
- Francisco Denis as Mariano Montilla.
- Miguel Ferrari as Pablo Morillo.
- Beatriz Valdés as María Antonia Bolívar Palacios.
- Robny Piñango as Pio.
- José Luis Useche as Manuel Piar.

== Reception ==
By 2021, Bolívar, Man of Difficulties had a rating of 2,6 out of 10 in IMDb.
