= Luna caliente =

- Theatrical release poster
- Directed by: Vicente Aranda
- Written by: Mempo Giardinelli; Vicente Aranda (adaptation)
- Produced by: Vicente Aranda; Rodolfo Montero de Palacio
- Starring: Eduard Fernández; Thaïs Blume; Emilio Gutiérrez Caba
- Cinematography: Joaquín Manchado
- Edited by: Teresa Font
- Music by: José Nieto
- Production companies: Cre-Acción Film, S.L; Viviana Films, S.L
- Distributed by: Paramount Spain, S.L
- Release dates: 30 October 2009 (Valladolid); 5 February 2010 (Spain)
- Running time: 93 minutes
- Country: Spain
- Language: Spanish
- Box office: 396.029,61 €

Luna caliente (English: Hot Moon) is a 2009 Spanish film written and directed by Vicente Aranda, starring Eduard Fernández and Thaïs Blume. The film is an adaptation of the novel of the same title by Argentine author Mempo Giardinelli. While the book was set during the last dictatorship in Argentina, Aranda set the story in Spain during the Burgos Trial of 1970, which caused some of the last death sentences in Spain during Francos' regime. The plot centers on a rape that changes the lives of the aggressor and his victim. The film premiered in October 2009 at the Valladolid International Film Festival and had a wide release in 2010.

== Plot ==
In the autumn of 1970, Juan, a Spanish poet living in Paris working for UNESCO, returns on vacation to his hometown, Burgos. The city is under heavy police and military surveillance due to the so-called Burgos process, a summary military trial against a group of ETA members and other militants against Francisco Franco's regime.

During his first night in Burgos, Juan has dinner with Dr. Miniente, an old colleague and family friend who lives in the outskirts of the city with his wife Antonia and their only daughter Ramona. Dr. Miniente is a sympathizer of the antifascist militants, Juan is more interested in Ramona, who is eighteen and shamelessly flirts with him. Once the dinner is over Juan is ready to leave but he is unable to start his rental car. Dr. Miniante invites him to spend the night at his house. Encouraged by Ramona's signals, Juan accepts. However once at bed he is unable to fall asleep thinking about Ramona and heads for her bedroom. She is not surprised to see him and he takes her initial favorable response as an invitation to go further. He rapes her. Since Ramona's mother is sound sleep and her father is by then drunk nobody hear her cries for help.

Juan, who believes he has killed the girl, is frightened out of the house and tries to leave when he is surprised by his host, who knows nothing about what happened, and drunk as he wants to go with him to a nearby brothel. Juan is unable to resist Dr. Miniente's insistence once he is inside the car and reluctantly agrees to give him a ride to a brothel. At one point they are stopped and interrogated by civil guards but are allowed to go their way. Dr. Miniente insists that he wants to party even though the sun is already risen. A heavy argument between the two men ends with the desperate Juan brutally hitting his heavily drunk friend. Juan leads the car to the side of a bridge, places his friend at the steering wheel and makes the car fall into the river.

By early morning, Juan returns to his mother's house hitchhiking. His sister Cristina, a secret member of the illicit Communist party, is following the news of the military trial against the members of ETA. Ramona looks for Juan. He apologizes but she does not regret what happened. She says she was not hurt and feels she is in love with him. Meanwhile, Ramona's mother has been frantically looking for her husband. At the same time, a police inspector, who does not believe that the doctor's death was an accident begins to investigate. Juan is heavily interrogated as the prime suspect and is almost forced to confess, but he is saved by Ramona who provides him with an alibi. At the same time, Juan's sister, involved in the struggle against Franco, has managed to obtain secret images of the Burgos process, and seeks to hide and get out of Spain.

== Cast ==
- Eduard Fernández as Juan
- Thaïs Blume as Ramona
- Emilio Gutiérrez Caba as Dr. Miniente
- José Coronado as Inspector
- Héctor Colomé as Militar
- Mary Carmen Ramírez as Juan's mother
- Carla Sánchez as Cristina
- Empar Ferrer as Antonia

== Home media ==
Luna caliente is available in Region 2 DVD. It was released in Spain on September 15, 2010. There is no Region 1 DVD available.
