= Chelaalapí Qom Choir =

Chelaalapí Qom Choir Coro Qom Chelaalapí
- Years active: 1962–present
- Website: Official website

The Chelaalapí Qom Choir was the first indigenous choir established in Latin America, formed in 1962 in the Toba neighborhood in the outskirts of the city of Resistencia, Chaco. The choir's name means "flock of thrushes".

It was declared a symbol of Chaco's cultural heritage by decree No. 1.491/2022 of the Provincial government. In 2006, UNESCO recognized the choir as part of the "living cultural heritage" of Chaco Province.

== History ==
The first rehearsals of the group were directed by Inés García de Márquez. They were initially an a capella group, eventually adding percussive instruments made of mate, n'vike (tin violin), rainsticks, and bass drums. Later, chajchas were incorporated.

During their 60 years of existence, the Chalaalapí Qom Choir has performed on many provincial, national and international stages, often sharing their knowledge through workshops and activities. The choir has experimented with different styles of music, including performing in fusion concerts with Latin American and international artists.

The choir has been recognized as an important part of the cultural heritage of the Qom people and the Province of Chaco by several organizations, including UNESCO, the Chamber of Deputies of Chaco, and the Argentine Senate.

== Discography ==
- Coro Chelaalapí Meets Lagartijeando (2019, Big In Japan)
- Remixes & Raíces (2018, Instituto de Cultura Chaco)
- Remixes Coro Chelaalapí (2017, ICC / Club del Disco)

== Live shows ==
In 2018, the choir, along with producer and DJ Matías Zundel, toured cities in Latin America and Europe, including Asunción, Madrid, and Berlin. In 2019, the group started and ended the year with the Chelaalapí Fest, first in Resistencia then in Buenos Aires. The choir also had a show at the Ancestral and Contemporary Festival, at the Rosario Flag Festival, and at Cordoba's Belle Epoque Club.

In 2020, the choir was invited to participate at the Tribal Gathering event which took place in Panamá. The event was a gathering of over 60 tribes from around the globe to exchange experiences, engage in discussions, and perform musical shows. The choir president stated, "the members of the choir consider themselves to be cultural ambassadors whose artistic expressions make their ancestral legacy public in every show in Argentina and the world. They are a constituent element of the rich, diverse and intercultural identity of Chaco."

== Members ==
=== Former members ===
- Gregorio Segundo (Shetoqshe)
- Rito Largo (Vaisogoshe)
- Amancio Sánchez
- Félix Núñez
- Oscar Oliva
- Mario Morales (Itaic)
- Zunilda Méndez (Igliaque)
- Florencio Lezcano (Chiglioyi)

=== Members as of 2021 ===
- Rosalía Patricio
- Enriqueta Escobilla
- Santa Oliva
- Rosa Largo
- Griselda Morales
- Zulma Núñez
- Claudio Largo
- Elvio Mansilla
- Omar Toledo
- Diego Castro
- Horacio Patricio
- Pablo Mansilla
- Román Gómez

=== Deceased members ===
- Erinda Martínez
- Zunilda Méndez
- Juan Rescio
- Gregorio Segundo
- Juana Núñez
- Ignacio Mancilla
