= Perdóname, señor =

Spanish television series

- Genre: Crime drama Romantic drama
- Created by: Frank Ariza
- Written by: Antonio Onetti
- Directed by: Alejandro Bazzano; Alberto Ruiz Rojo; Rafa Montesinos; Frank Ariza
- Starring: Paz Vega; Stany Coppet; Jesús Castro
- Country of origin: Spain
- Original language: Spanish
- No. of seasons: 1
- No. of episodes: 8

Production
- Running time: 70 min (approx.)
- Production companies: Mediaset España; Gossip Events Productions

Original release
- Network: Telecinco
- Release: 25 May – 20 July 2017

Perdóname, señor (transl. 'Forgive Me, Lord') is a Spanish crime drama television series created by Frank Ariza and written by Antonio Onetti, starring Paz Vega, Stany Coppet and Jesús Castro, dealing about drug trafficking in the Coast of Cádiz. It aired on Telecinco from May 2017 to July 2017.

== Premise ==
Lucía Medina, a nun, returns to her hometown in Barbate. There she meets Rafa, her son, raised by her brother Miguel, and Bruno Lachambre, Rafa's (unaware) biological father, Lucía's former love interest and drug lord.

== Cast ==
- Paz Vega as Lucía Medina.
- Stany Coppet as Bruno Lachambre.
- Jesús Castro as Rafa Medina.
- Paco Tous as Miguel Medina.
- Estefanía de los Santos as Antonia Camacho.
- Andrea Duro as Claudia.
- Antonio de la Torre as El Rojo.
- Ruth Gabriel as Paca.
- Christian Sánchez as Alvarito.
- Diego Domínguez as Dani.
- Mikel Iglesias as El Perla.
- José Manuel Seda as Ramón Menéndez.
- Lucía Guerrero as Paula.
- Helena Kaittani as Marisa.
- Silvia Marty as Irene Oliver.
- Enrique Arce as Ignacio Barea.
- Pau Cólera as Lario.
- Sandra Collantes as Lorena Velarde.
- Verónica Moral as Marta Soler.
- Antonio Zabálburu as José.
- Chanel Terrero as Sibebi.

== Production and release ==
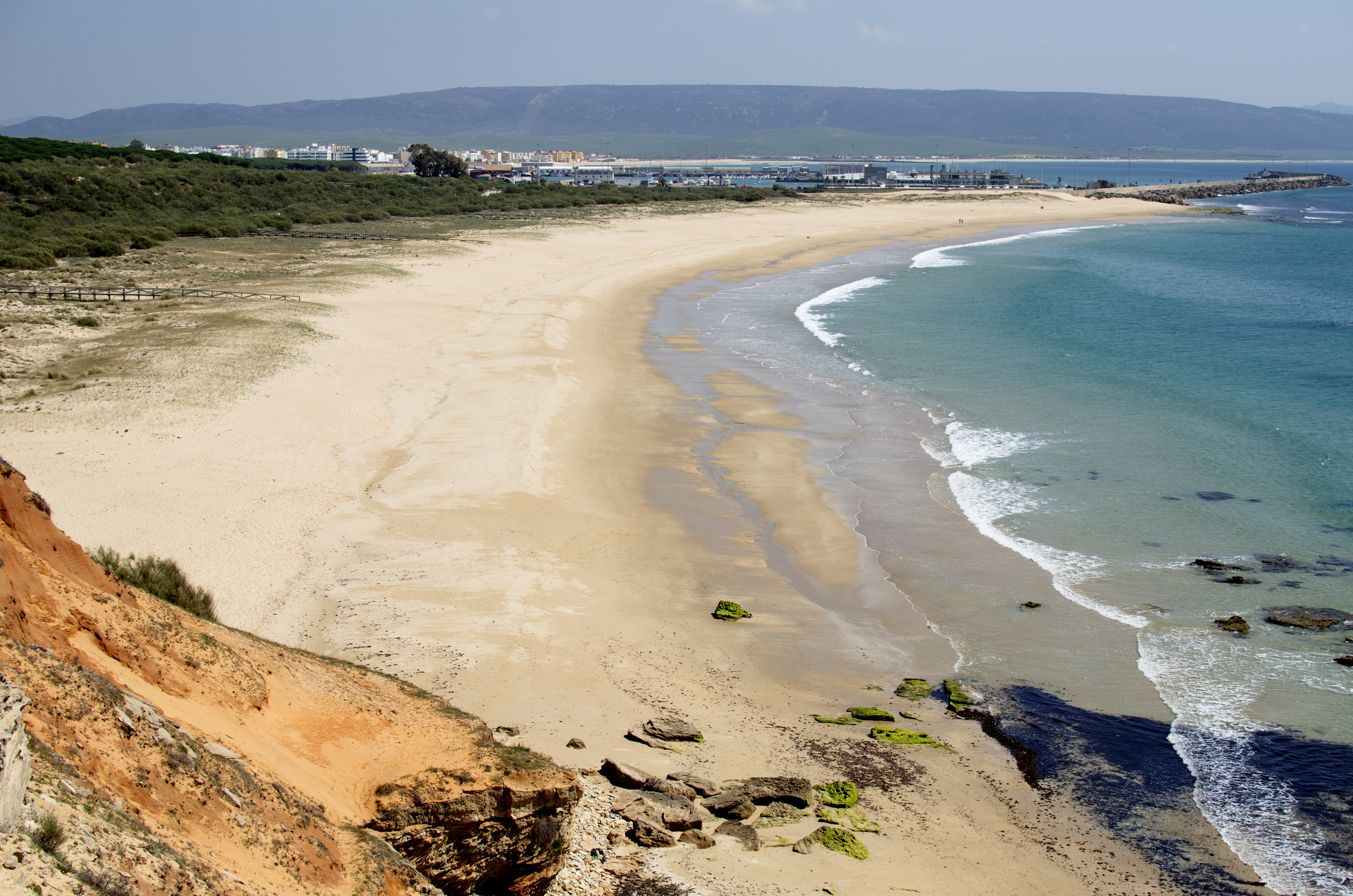
Playa de la Hierbabuena

Created by Frank Ariza, Perdóname, señor was produced by Gossip Events Productions and Mediaset España. The screenplay was authored by Alejandro Onetti whereas the episodes were directed by Alejandro Bazzano, Alberto Ruiz Rojo, Rafa Montesinos and Ariza himself. It consisted of 8 episodes with an average running time of 70 min. The series was shot in Barbate. Shooting locations for action scenes (such as chases and drug deliveries) included the Hierbabuena Beach, the Nuestra Señora del Carmen Beach, Los Alemanes Beach and the Barbate tidal marsh.

The series premiered on Telecinco on 25 May 2017. The broadcasting run ended on 20 July 2017. The series was a great ratings success for Telecinco, averaging a 19.1% audience share and leading its time slot in 7 out of 8 episodes.

Series	Episodes	Originally released			Viewers	Share (%)	Ref.
Series	Episodes	First released	Last released	Network	Viewers	Share (%)	Ref.
1	8	25 May 2017	20 July 2017	Telecinco	2,824,000	19.1	

This is a caption
No. in season	Title	Viewers	Original release date	Share (%)
1	"Espuma de mar"	3,117,000	25 May 2017	19.0
2	"Marea baja"	3,294,000	1 June 2017	20.7
3	"Alta mar"	2,869,000	15 June 2017	18.7
4	"Gota a gota"	2,966,000	22 June 2017	20.6
5	"En un mar de lágrimas"	2,499,000	29 June 2017	16.0
6	"Mar en calma"	2,603,000	6 July 2017	18.7
7	"Viento y oleaje"	2,621,000	13 July 2017	19.3
8	"Decía siempre el mar..."	2,621,000	20 July 2017	19.8
