= Stany Coppet =

French actor

Stany Coppet (born 22 June 1976) is a French actor.

== Biography ==
In 2003, he left Paris for New York City where he studied acting, dancing and singing at the Lee Strasberg Theatre Institute. On stage in New York, he performed at the Repertory and the Century Center for the Performing Arts. Then, along with Steven Adams and Steven Soderbergh, he co-produced Roger Guenveur Smith's solo performance "Who Killed Bob Marley" at the Bootleg Theater in Los Angeles. Coppet is the creator of the show "From slavery to freedom (Speeches and poems on colonialism and slavery)" produced for the first time in French Guiana, then at the City Hall of Paris and for the U.S. Embassy in Paris.

In 2010, Coppet was in the movie "Orpailleur" by Marc Barrat. The same year for the Spanish cinema in "Aguila Roja" (dir. Jose Ramon Ayerra, prod. Globomedia), Coppet played the part of Claude Acheron, El Mosquetero. In February 2010 he produced and starred alongside Dolores Chaplin, Kasi Lemmons and Vondie Curtis-Hall in his show "From Slavery to Freedom" at the Cantor Film Center in New York. In 2011, in a France 2 biopic of Toussaint Louverture, Stany Coppet played the role of General André Rigaud. In 2013, Coppet joined the cast of the Telecinco series El Príncipe, in the role of Khaled. Coppet also appeared in and co-wrote the film La Vie Pure directed by Jeremy Banster, based on the life of the French explorer Raymond Maufrais, who disappeared in the Amazon forest of French Guiana in 1950.

== Partial filmography ==
=== Cinema ===
- 2014: La Vie Pure - Pure Life directed by Jeremy Banster
- 2011: Águila Roja la Película directed by José Ramon Ayerra
- 2010: Orpailleur directed by Marc Barrat
- 2010: Mortem directed by Éric Atlan

=== Television ===
- 2018: Los nuestros, Telecinco
- 2017: Perdóname, señor, Telecinco
- 2014: El Príncipe, Telecinco
- 2012: Toussaint Louverture directed by Philippe Niang
- 2011: Death In Paradise directed by Roger Golby
- 2011: Section de recherches directed by Jean Marc Thérin
- 2011: Le Fabuleux Chevalier de Saint George directed by Claude Ribbe
- 2009: The black Devil directed by Claude Ribbe
