= Principe (surname) =

Principe is a surname of Spanish and Italian origin. Notable persons with that surname include:

- Gene Principe (born 1967), Canadian sports reporter
- Joe Principe (born 1974), American rock guitarist
- Lawrence M. Principe, American historian of science
- Maria Matilde Principi (1915–2017), Italian entomologist
- Nick Principe (born 1978), American actor

John Principe (born 1997) social media editor at The Score
