= Al salir de clase =

Spanish teen drama television series

- Genre: Teen drama Soap opera
- Country of origin: Spain
- No. of seasons: 5
- No. of episodes: 1,199

Production
- Running time: 25 min (approx.)
- Production company: BocaBoca

Original release
- Network: Telecinco
- Release: 8 September 1997 – 12 July 2002

Al salir de clase is a Spanish teen drama television series produced by BocaBoca. The 1,199-episode-long broadcasting run on Telecinco spanned from September 1997 to July 2002.

== Premise ==
The fiction, set in the Madrilenian Instituto Siete Robles, deals with the mishaps of a group of teenagers, including relationships, accidents, revenges, deaths, beatings, drugs, divorces, kidnappings, breakups and the bullying from the so-called "banda del bate".

== Cast ==
- Elsa Pataky as Raquel Alonso.
- Paula Echevarría as Berta.
- Hugo Silva as Guillermo Sierra.
- Leticia Dolera as Ángela Illera.
- Pilar López de Ayala as Carlota Chacón.
- Alejo Sauras as Santi Rivelles.
- Olivia Molina as Nadine Martín.
- Diana Palazón as Miranda Durán.
- Fran Perea as Hugo Garbisu.
- Lucía Jiménez as Silvia Castro.
- Marián Aguilera as Miriam Medina.
- Cristina Castaño as Lydia Celada.
- Raquel Meroño as Paloma García.
- Javier Pereira as Enrique Cobos, "Triki".
- Miguel Ángel Muñoz as Javi Castro.
- Víctor Clavijo as Raúl Daroca.
- Carlos Sobera as Eduardo Medina.
- Rodolfo Sancho as Nico.
- Sergio Peris-Mencheta as Dani Daroca Lavín.
- Marta Solaz as Violeta.
- Félix Gómez as Jero Ruiz.
- Laura Manzanedo as Clara del Río.
- Rubén Ochandiano as Marcos Jiménez.
- Pilar Castro as Cristina Angulo.
- Elsa Pinilla as Elsa Parodi.
- Octavi Pujades as Jaime Salmerón.
- Carmen Morales de las Heras as María Salas.
- Fernando Andina as Mateo Fernández.
- Carola Baleztena as Lucía.
- Bea Segura as Claudia.
- Mariano Alameda as Íñigo.
- Dani Martín as member of the banda del Bate.
- Sergio Villoldo as Álex.
- Roberto Hoyas as Alberto.
- Daniel Huarte as David.
- Athenea Mata as Elena.
- Pilar Velázquez as Begoña.

== Production and release ==
The series was produced by BocaBoca. The pilot premiered on 8 September 1997. The broadcasting run comprised 5 seasons, with 1,199 episodes featuring a running time of 25 minutes aired on a Monday to Friday basis. The series was brought to an end on 12 July 2002. Starting with poor audience figures in the opening episode (1.5 million viewers), ratings progressively went up to a peak of 3.6 million viewers. The series became one of the pioneer shows regarding LGBTI representation in Spanish fiction and the gay character performed by Alejo Sauras earned applause from the LGBTI community at the time.

== Awards and nominations ==
Year	Award	Category	Nominee(s)	Result	Ref.
2001	48th Ondas Awards	Best TV Series		Won	
