= Javier Pereira (actor) =

Spanish actor (born 1981)

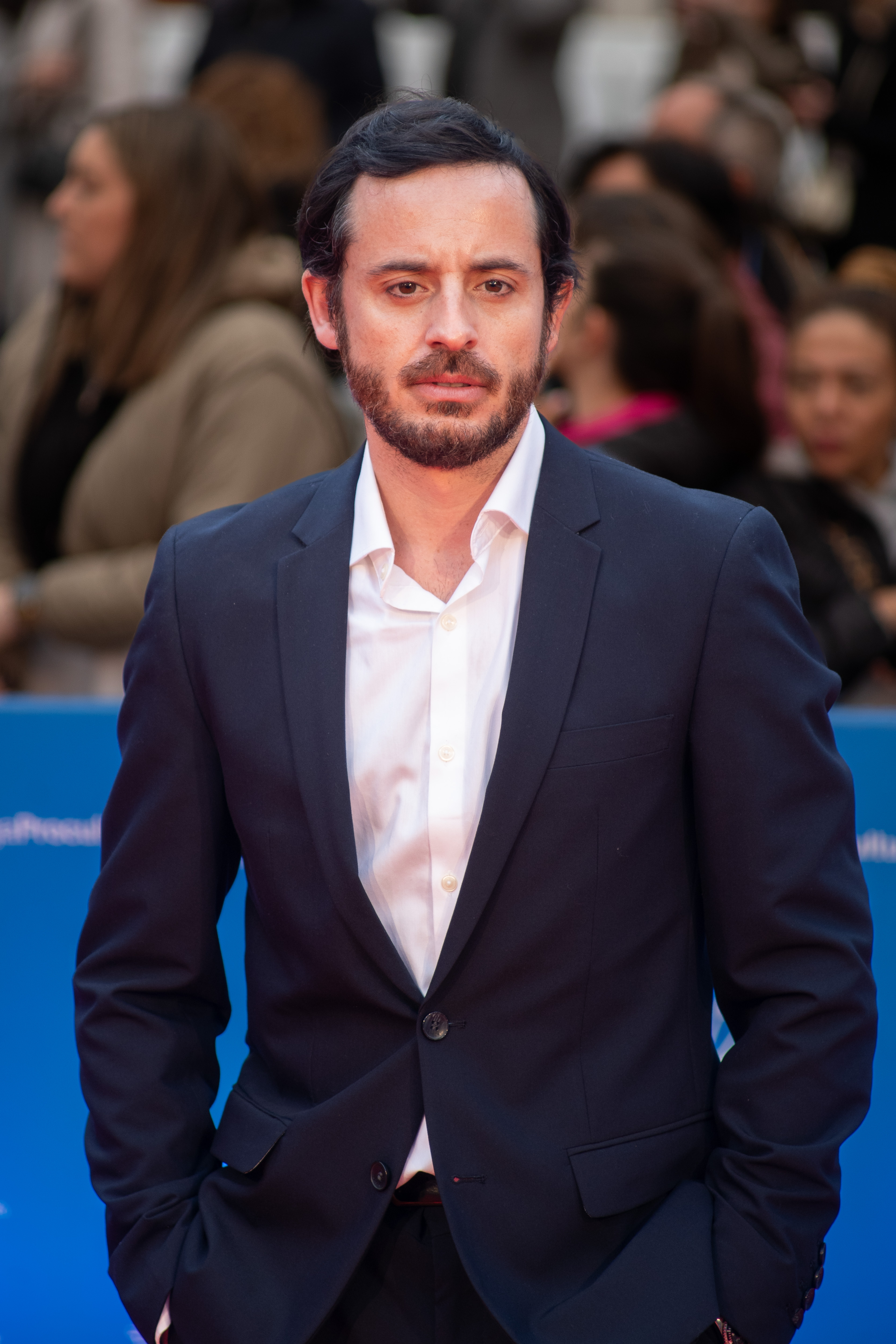
- Pereira in 2024
- Born: Javier Pereira Collado; 5 November 1981 (age 44); Madrid, Spain
- Occupation: Actor

Javier Pereira Collado (born 5 November 1981) is a Spanish actor. He won the Goya Award for Best New Actor for his performance in Stockholm (2013).

== Personal life ==
From 2009 to 2011, Pereira was in a relationship with fellow actress Blanca Suárez.

== Filmography ==
=== Films ===
- ¡Hasta aquí hemos llegado! (2002)
- Frío sol de invierno (2004)
- Heroína (2005)
- A golpes (2005)
- La bicicleta (2006)
- Tu vida en 65 minutos (2006)
- Días azules (2006)
- Aparecidos (2007)
- 8 citas (2008)
- Animal de compañía (2008)
- Amigos... (2011)
- No tengas miedo (2011)
- Amanecidos (2011)
- Para Elisa (2013)
- Stockholm (2013)
- La sangre de Wendy (2014)
- Anochece en la India (2014)
- Que Dios nos perdone (2016)
- Asesinato en la Universidad (2018)
- El instinto (2024)
- La niña de la cabra (TBD)
- El escuerzo (in Spanish) (2018)
- Dreadful Mother (2026)

=== Short films ===
- Campeones (1997)
- El último día del principio de tu vida (2004)
- Busco (2006)
- Traumalogía (2007)
- Misericordiam Tuam (2008)
- El viaje al paraíso (2008)
- La vida que me queda (2010)
- Sexo explícito (2013)
- Objetos perdidos (2014)

=== Television series ===
- Señor alcalde (1998)
- Nada es para siempre (1999–2000)
- Policías, en el corazón de la calle (2000)
- Al salir de clase (2001–02)
- El comisario (2002)
- Hospital central (2004)
- El comisario (2005)
- Cuestión de sexo (2007–08)
- Revelados (2008)
- Aída (2009)
- Hospital central (2009)
- El Gordo: una historia verdadera (2010)
- Doctor Mateo (2010)
- La pecera de Eva (2011)
- 14 de abril. La República (2011)
- Ángel o demonio (2011)
- Los misterios de Laura (2011)
- Gran hotel (2011)
- Frágiles (2012)
- Gran Reserva: El origen (2013)
- Heridas (2022)
- Cuéntame cómo pasó (2023)

== Awards and nominations ==
Award	Year	Category	Nominated work	Result
Goya Awards	2013	Best New Actor	Stockholm	Won
