= El Príncipe (TV series) =

- Genre: Crime drama; Thriller
- Created by: Aitor Gabilondo; César Benítez
- Starring: José Coronado; Hiba Abouk; Álex González; Rubén Cortada; Samy Khalil; Stany Coppet; Ayoub El Hilali; Thaïs Blume; María Guinea; Elia Galera; Juan Manuel Lara; Susana Córdoba; Jesús Castro; Ahmed Younossi; Nerea Barros
- Country of origin: Spain
- Original language: Spanish
- No. of seasons: 2
- No. of episodes: 29

Original release
- Release: February 4, 2014 – June 23, 2015

El Príncipe is a Spanish television series of drama and suspense created by Aitor Gabilondo and César Benítez for Telecinco. The series, produced by Mediaset Spain in collaboration with Plano a Plano, is aimed at a young audience. Its plot is centered on the love between a Christian policeman from the Spanish mainland and the young Muslim sister of a drug trafficker. Most of the stories are set in the troubled El Príncipe Alfonso neighbourhood of Ceuta, near the border with Morocco.

The series debuted on February 4, 2014 in Spain with a multichannel broadcast that gave high viewing rates. On its launch it obtained 21.9% viewing rate (27.7% in multichannel) and was leader in all its broadcasts during the first season.

== History ==
The project's history goes back to October 27, 2011, when the company Mediaset Spain Communication announced they had in mind a new project based on the detective genre. The statement further explained that the setting would be the fight against drug trafficking; its plot revolves around the presence of a policeman stationed in Ceuta who tries to fight drug trafficking between Spain and Africa, and who is pursuing a Moroccan leader whose younger sister falls in love with him. It was also reported that the main character of the series would be the actor José Coronado, who had starred in the film No Rest for the Wicked in the role of Santos Trinidad as a police inspector - this film was produced by the same company and was a big success at the box office.

== Plot ==
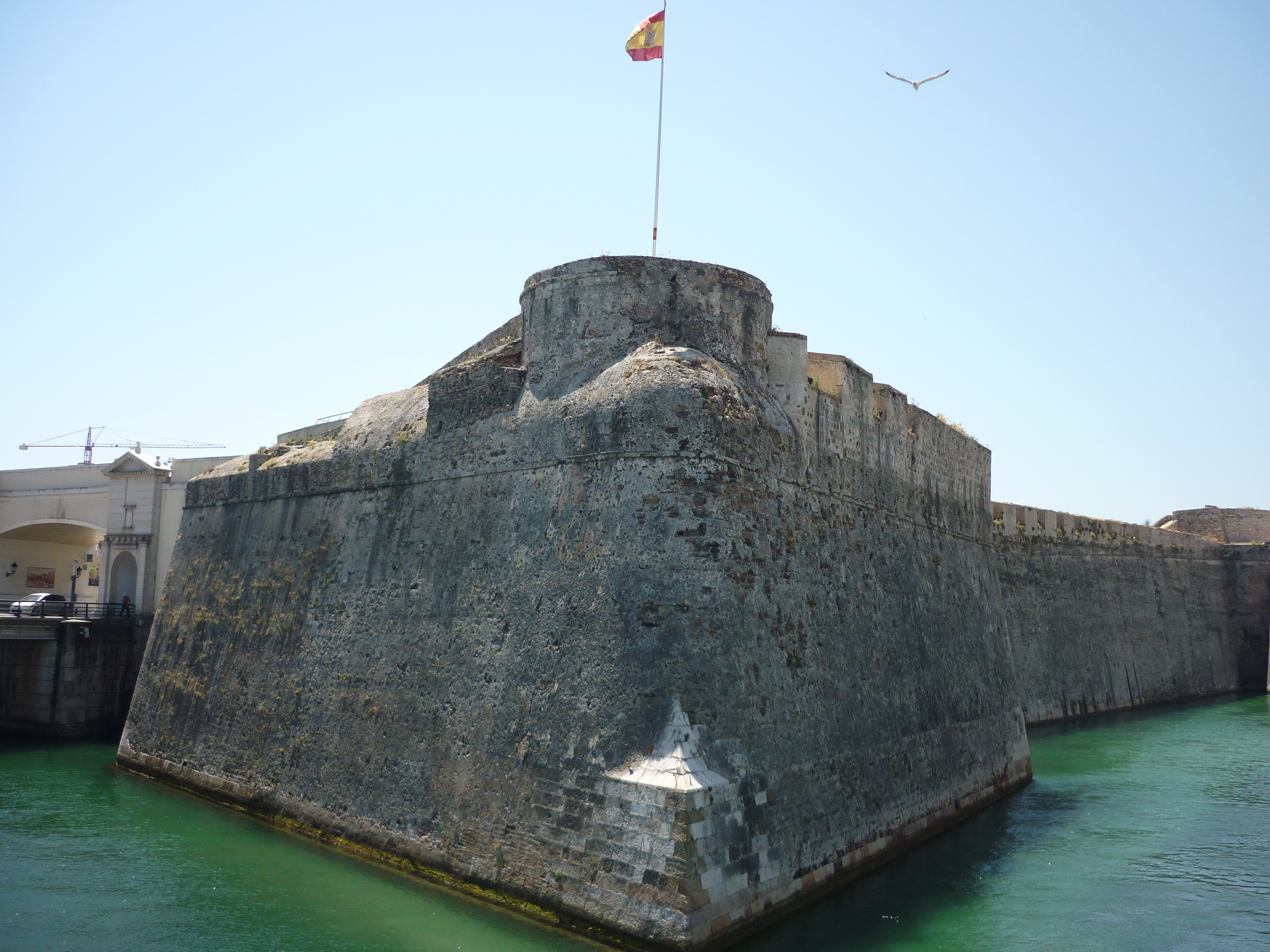
The series is set in a district of Ceuta. Most of the scenes were not filmed in that city, but in a film studio in Madrid. The series does show some of the best-known places in Ceuta, such as the Murallas Reales ("royal walls").

In the troubled neighborhood of El Príncipe, Fran, a veteran police officer, has no doubts about using unorthodox methods to enforce order. This seems to be in danger with the arrival of Morey, a CNI agent, who uses the police station as cover to investigate a suspected police collaboration with a jihadist network. Morey's situation is complicated with the arrival of Fátima, an idealistic Muslim teacher who is looking for her vanished little brother, Abdu, while opposing the criminal activities of her other brother, Faruq, one of the biggest drug dealers in the neighborhood. However, Faruq is not the villain of the story. Then everything gets complicated when they become aware of a terrorist gang called Akrab, which blows up young people to terrorize the city. Meanwhile, Morey offers Fátima a chance to go to the peninsula with him, but, as they are about to depart, her brother Abdu returns to Ceuta on a tour bus with a bomb on board. When the police get to know this, they try to talk to him. The bomb does not go off, but Abdu is shot in the head by Morey. This leads into a second season with an impossible love affair between Morey and Fátima.

== Cast and characters ==
- José Coronado as Francisco "Fran" Peyón: a decisive man, with leadership and people skills, a police officer who has been in post in Ceuta for twelve years and is in charge of the police station in el Principe. When chief inspector Morey arrives as his superior officer, the veteran cop hinders the younger man's plans and covers up what has been going on in the neighborhood in all that time.
- Álex González as Javier Morey: discreet, serious and with guts, a young chief inspector working under a fake identity, sent by the CNI to el Principe to investigate the recruitment techniques and sources of funding for Islamic radical groups that capture teenagers in Ceuta. Meeting Fatima makes him rethink his priorities.
- Hiba Abouk as Fátima Ben Barek: entangled in the doings of her relatives, a young Spanish woman with a Muslim background who works as a teacher in the local civic center. She is obsessed with finding Abdu, her younger brother, who disappeared months ago. However, with the arrival of Morey, she finds the support she needed. Her objective is to stop the conflicts in the peninsula and fight to put local people on the right track, but this causes numerous confrontations with her brother Faruq.
- Rubén Cortada as Faruq Ben Barek: the older brother of Fátima, a troubled man who seeks danger. He is considered to be one of the biggest drug dealers in El Príncipe and causes serious clashes with Fran due to a conflict of interest that will finally unite them. Faruq is foremost a family man who values tradition and everything he does is for them. When agent Morey arrives in the neighborhood and Faruq sees the developing relationship between Morey and his sister Fátima, the young man becomes angry because Fátima is about to marry Khaled and his family would never accept it if the marriage did not go ahead.
- Stany Coppet as Khaled Ashour: a Moroccan businessman in the construction trade, engaged to his cousin Fátima. His brother-in-law Faruq is convinced that Khaled's companies might be useful to hide his illicit dealings. But with the arrival of inspector Morey, he will be forced to confront many difficulties.
- Elia Galera as Raquel: Fran's wife and the mother of two children. A stylish and cultivated woman, who at times gets into difficulties that her husband has to get her out of, because she has still not got over the murder years ago of her son Alberto. She has become weak and has gradually become distanced from her family.
- Samy Khalil as Abdessalam "Abdu" Ben Barek: he is the third child of the Ben Barek family, and the absent protagonist of the first season, when his family is trying to get him back from the jihadists. He appears in the final episode of the first season on a coach arriving in Ceuta, intending to blow up the coach and himself. A moment before he sets off the bomb, Morey shoots him fatally.
- Carla Díaz as Nayat Ben Barek, the youngest of the Ben Barek siblings.

== Production ==
The series is produced by Plano a Plano, under the direction of Aitor Gabilondo and Cesar Benitez as creators, executive producers and writers, who had worked for the channel previously on series including Periodistas and El comisario.

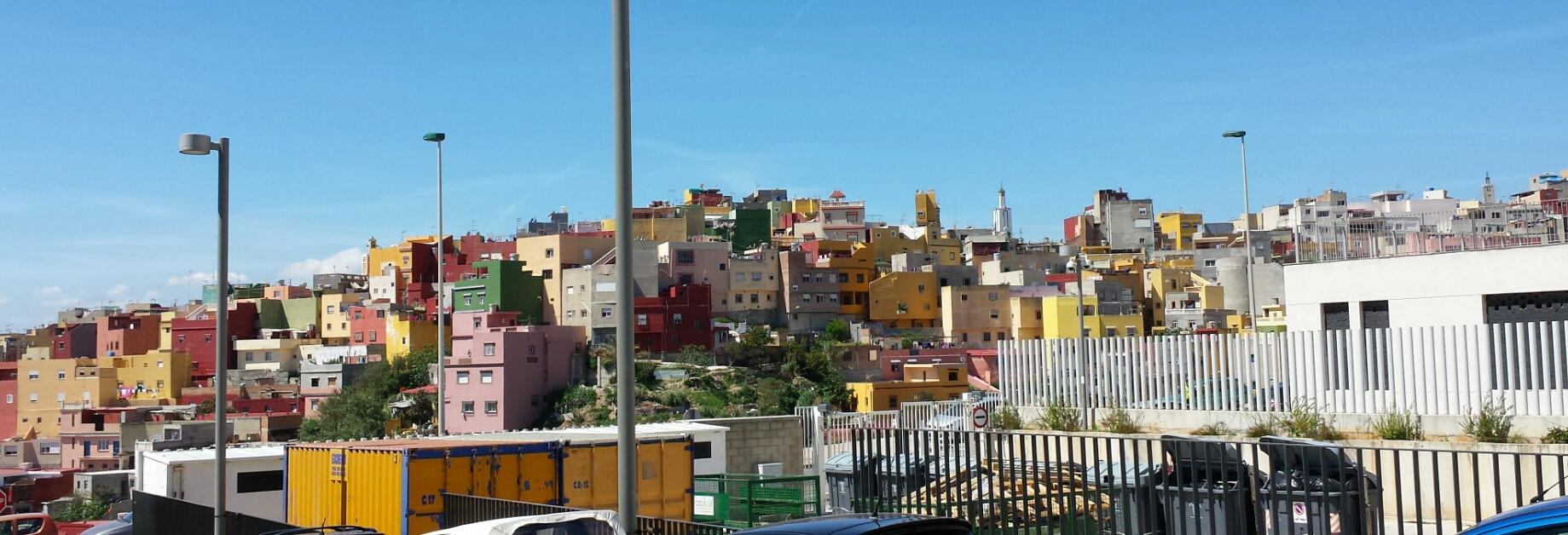
El Príncipe neighbourhood in Ceuta.

At first there was no fixed end point, but in June 2014 the company and producers agreed that the second season would consist of 16 episodes each divided into eight sections. It is notable that the episodes were shot entirely on location in Ceuta, Granada, Madrid and Malta and later edited. As for the system of writing, the team first thought of the ending for each episode and then worked towards the beginning. For the process of post-production, Stargate Studios Malta was responsible for the visual effects of the series, which meant that through the clever use of vfx techniques a story set in Ceuta could be filmed many miles away in Madrid. The involvement of Stargate Studios Malta was announced by Aitor Gabilondo, executive producer of the series, at a press presentation in May 2013, explaining that Telecinco's new venture in 2014 would mostly be shot in Madrid, and that the Ceuta barrio of El Príncipe Alfonso would be recreated using visual effects.

Filming began in Ceuta on 13 May 2013. Most scenes were not shot in El Principe but in other neighborhoods of the city or in Madrid. The second and final season also made use of digital technology; in addition, some location filming for this stage took place in the cities of Valletta and Granada. Filming for this second season began on 9 June 2014.

== Controversy ==
Several voices denounced the distortion of the image of Ceuta and the stigmatization of the city that it is thought the series would entail, specifically to the neighborhood of El Príncipe, by what they saw as distorted images of the city's reality. The president of the neighborhood denied that the police would turn a blind eye as depicted in the series. It is also disputed that El Príncipe is the most dangerous neighborhood in Spain as indicated in the series, relative to other districts such as Las 3000 Viviendas in Seville.

An opinion piece in Al Jazeera argued that the series could distort perceptions of Muslims within the Spanish public.

== Episodes and audience figures ==
The first episode was seen by over 4.4 million viewers and gained a 21.9% audience share, making it the most-watched premiere of any Telecinco television series since the start of Aida in January 2005. Its broadcast every Tuesday night established the series as the most viewed show in prime time and it was named as the program with the largest audience on that day. During the screening of the first episode the audience for that day reached a maximum, with 4,671,000 viewers and a 22.2% share. Moreover, it is noteworthy that the first episode of fiction was aired on a simulcast on six of the channels (Telecinco, Factoría de Ficción, Divinity, Energy, LaSiete and Nueve) operated by Mediaset España, which raised the overall average to 27.7% share and to 5.6 million viewers, while the "golden minute" attracted around 6.1 million viewers. The first airing of the series generated 76,402 mentions on social media by 51,158 users, and it became the leader in social-media impact with several hashtags. The first season ranked as the most watched series of the last two years and the largest audience on Telecinco since 2007-08, as well as achieving the largest impact of 2014 with over 800,000 comments on social networks.

Season	Episodes	Originally released		Viewers	Share
Season	Episodes	First released	Last released	Viewers	Share
1	13	February 4, 2014	May 6, 2014	5,219,000	26.8%
2	16	April 14, 2015	June 23, 2015	TBA	TBA

=== Season 1 (2014) ===
No. overall	No. in season	Title	Original release date (Spain)	Original release date (UK)	Viewers (millions)
1	1	"Bienvenido a El Principe"	February 4, 2014	18 January 2016	4.463 (21.9%)
2	2	"Agua salada"	February 11, 2014	25 January 2016	5.281 (26.2%)
3	3	"Confía en mí"	February 18, 2014	1 February 2016	5.404 (27.4%)
4	4	"Haz lo que tengas que hacer"	February 25, 2014	8 February 2016	5.224 (26.4%)
5	5	"Circular 50"	March 4, 2014	15 February 2016	5.204 (26.3%)
6	6	"El escorpión"	March 11, 2014	22 February 2016	5.555 (28.6%)
7	7	"En el filo de la navaja"	March 18, 2014	29 February 2016	5.244 (27.8%)
8	8	"Pasar al otro lado"	March 25, 2014	7 March 2016	5.19 (26.4%)
9	9	"La noche más larga"	April 1, 2014	14 March 2016	5.421 (27.7%)
10	10	"El elegido"	April 8, 2014	21 March 2016	5.006 (26%)
11	11	"Enemigos y cómplices"	April 22, 2014	28 March 2016	4.795 (25.7%)
12	12	"Líneas paralelas"	April 29, 2014	4 April 2016	4.77 (25.4%)
13	13	"Fe ciega"	May 6, 2014	11 April 2016	6.29 (33.3%)

=== Season 2 (2015) ===
No. overall	No. in season	Title	Original release date (Spain)	Original release date (UK)	Viewers (millions)
14	1	"El reencuentro"	April 14, 2015	23 August 2016	4.883 (24.7%)
15	2	"Las manos atadas"	April 21, 2015	30 August 2016	5.114 (26.2%)
16	3	"Claves de acceso"	April 28, 2015	6 September 2016	4.495 (22.7%)
17	4	"El intocable"	May 5, 2015	13 September 2016	4.683 (23.6%)
18	5	"Ojo por ojo"	May 12, 2015	20 September 2016	4.799 (24.7%)
19	6	"Medias verdades"	May 19, 2015	27 September 2016	4.61 (23.8%)
20	7	"Operación Galgo"	May 26, 2015	4 October 2016	4.885 (24.7%)
21	8	"El diablo lo sabe"	June 2, 2015	11 October 2016	4.433 (23.1%)
22	9	"¿Es así como quieres morir?"	June 16, 2015	18 October 2016	4.487 (23.1%)
23	10	"El efecto llamada"	June 23, 2015	25 October 2016	3.713 (23.5%)

== Awards and nominations ==
Year	Award	Category	Nominees	Result	Ref.
2014	2nd MiM Series Awards	Best Drama Series		Won	
2014	2nd MiM Series Awards	Best Creation		Nominated	
2014	2nd MiM Series Awards	Best Actress	Hiba Abouk	Nominated	
2014	2nd MiM Series Awards	Best Actor	Álex González	Nominated	
2015	65th Fotogramas de Plata	Best TV Actress	Hiba Abouk	Nominated	
2015	65th Fotogramas de Plata	Best TV Actor	Álex González	Nominated	
2015	3rd MiM Series Awards	Best Drama Series		Nominated	
2015	3rd MiM Series Awards	Best Direction		Nominated	
2016	66th Fotogramas de Plata	Best TV Actress	Hiba Abouk	Nominated	
2016	4th MiM Series Awards	Best Drama Series		Nominated	
2016	4th MiM Series Awards	Best Drama Actor	José Coronado	Nominated	
