= N'vike =

The n'vike (alternately novike, n'vique, nobike) is a bowed string instrument native to the indigenous Toba people of the Gran Chaco of South America. A modern instrument can be described as a composite lute-type chordophone with a neck made from a pickaxe handle, a resonator made from a tin box and a string rubbed with a bow made of horsehair. The instrument is the result of cultural fusion; Native Americans observed European-style instruments and experimented to create their own.

It is an instrument of the Quechua culture. The instrument functions to "awaken" the dance and to remind people of traditional melodies. It was sometimes accompanied by the Kopakataki drum.

The term n'vike has no equivalent in English, but refers to the act of a jaguar sharpening his claws on a tree.

== Form ==
The n'vike is a monochord which is bowed with a string bow, called checne'c. Originally, the string (lket) was made from the mane of a peccary, but after the arrival of the Spanish horsehair replaced it.

The monochord is placed atop a resonating body such as a calabaza gourd, an armadillo shell, or a tin box with an opening in the top.

== Qom legend ==
There is a Qom legend about the origin of the n'vike. The account is that there was a man called La'axaraxaik, which in the Qom language means "the ugly one", who for that reason could not get a woman, leading him to be sad and lonely. One day, a man who called himself the owner of the mountain gave him an instrument never seen before, the n'vike—in addition to introducing him to his daughter, with whom La'axaraxaik fell in love and married.

La'axaraxaik's happiness was reflected in the beautiful and joyful music that he played until the other women, who previously rejected him, began looking for him. One night, his wife, finding him with other women, took the n'vike and threw it into the campfire, where the instrument burned creating a light that formed the morning star (Venus).

Abandoned by his wife, La'axaraxaik recovered the burned n'vike, but was never able to draw happy melodies from it again. Upon his death, the instrument was forgotten. Much later, a young man who could not be with his beloved because of the great distance that separated them found the old n'vike and began to play it. His melodies were so sad that they moved the owner of the forest, who then resorted to magic so the woman could listen to the music of her beloved, who then ran to meet her. Since then, if a lover is separated from his wife, he will be able to play the n'vike while pronouncing the name of his beloved, and before sunset the meeting will take place.
