= Aquiles Báez =

Venezuelan musician (1964–2022)

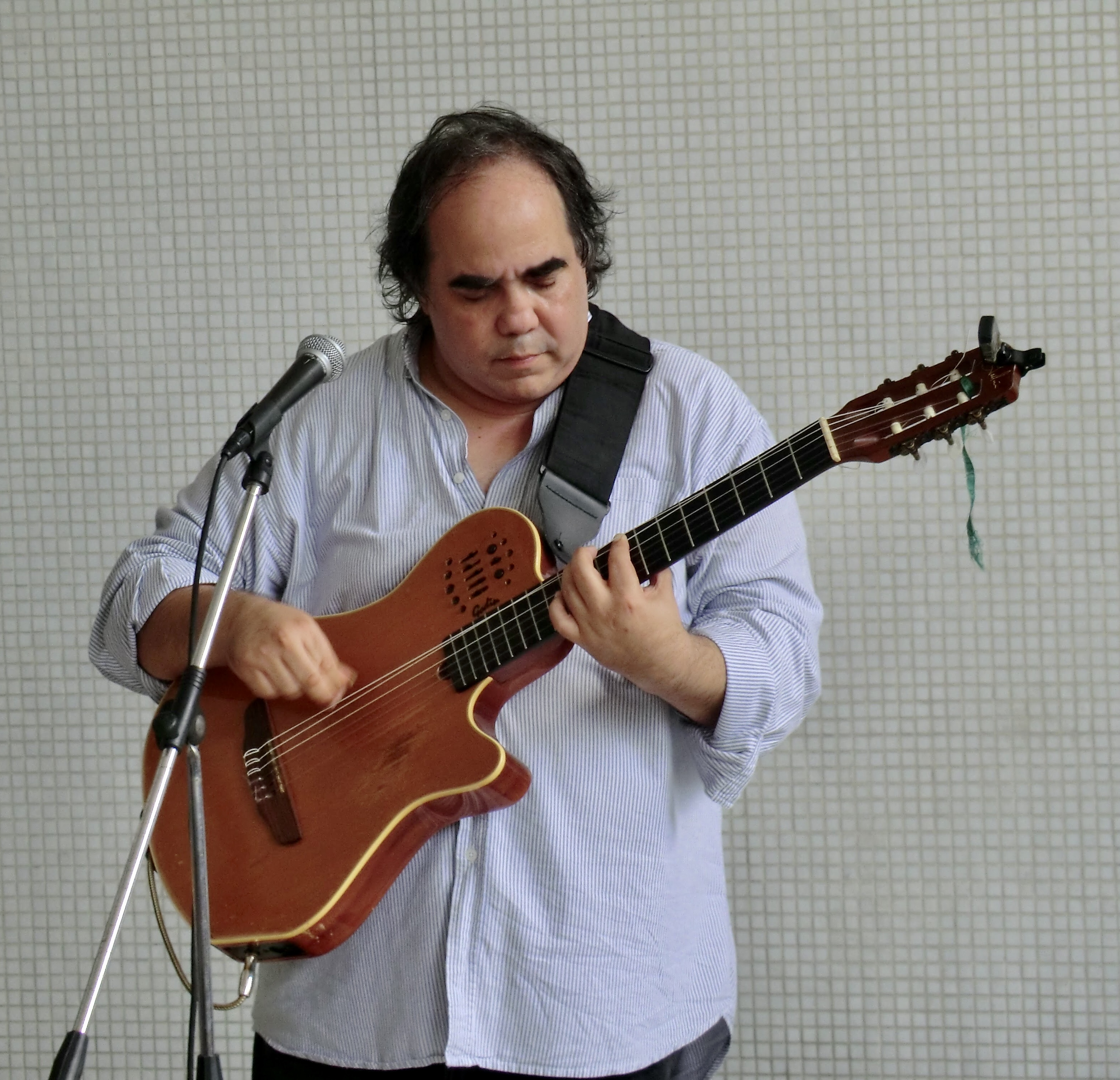
- Báez in 2011

Background information
- Born: Aquiles Alejandro Báez Reyes; 1 March 1964; Caracas, Venezuela
- Died: 12 September 2022 (aged 58)
- Occupations: Musician; arranger; composer
- Instruments: Guitar; cuatro; viola; mandolin; percussion
- Website: www.aquilesbaez.com

Aquiles Alejandro Báez Reyes (1 March 1964 – 12 September 2022), better known as Aquiles Báez, was a Venezuelan musician, arranger, and composer.

== Biography ==
Báez was born, studied, and grew up in the Venezuelan capital, Caracas, but spent a significant part of his childhood in La Vela de Coro. His childhood trips were to a 17th-century house owned by his family, near the site where Francisco de Miranda first raised the Venezuelan tricolor flag in 1806. This house is known as "La Casa Azul" ('The Blue House'). Báez composed a song of that name, which was included on his third album and catapulted him to fame.

He became interested in music thanks to his older brother, Julio, who taught him to play the cuatro. He then took lessons in viola, mandolin, and percussion.

His died while he was on a tour called the Europa Tour September 2022, performing new songs and planning to visit ten cities in countries such as Spain, Switzerland, France, Germany, and Portugal. Additionally, Báez had planned to release a book of his musical compositions and another of songs and guitar pieces.

Báez released seventeen albums, more than 200 recordings with other artists, and participated in concerts with musicians including Aquiles Machado, Carlos Aguirre, Dawn Upshaw, Ed Simon, Ensamble Gurrufío, Fareed Haque, Giora Feidman, Ilan Chester, John Patitucci, Lucía Pulido, Luciana Souza, Luisito Quintero, Marco Granados, Mariana Baraj, Mike Marshall, Naná Vasconcelos, Oscar Stagnaro, Paquito D'Rivera, Raúl Jaurena, Richard Bona, Simón Díaz, and Worlds of Guitars, among others.
