= Casita del Príncipe =

Casita del Príncipe may refer to either of two houses in the Madrid region:

- Casita del Príncipe (El Escorial)
- Casita del Príncipe (El Pardo)
