= A puro corazón =

Television series

- Genre: Telenovela
- Created by: César Cierra
- Based on: A todo corazón by Laura Visconti
- Directed by: Luis Alberto Lamata; José Luis Zuleta
- Starring: José Ramón Barreto; Michelle De Andrade
- Country of origin: Venezuela
- Original language: Spanish

Production
- Executive producer: Francisco Busatto
- Cinematography: Johnny Febles
- Editor: Jonathan Pellicer
- Camera setup: Multi-camera

Original release
- Network: Televen
- Release: September 14, 2015 – March 14, 2016

A puro corazón is a Venezuelan telenovela produced by Francisco Busatto for Televen. It is a remake of the Venezuelan telenovela, A todo corazón produced by Venevisión in 1998.

== Plot ==
The story revolves around a group of students in the final year of high school, a crucial stage in the life of the teenager.

== Cast ==
- José Ramón Barreto as Alejandro Rodríguez
- Michelle De Andrade as Patricia Gutiérrez
- Lino Bellini as "Zacarias Mora (Zacky)"
- Carla Fiorella Gardié as Coraima López
- Rebeca Herrera Martínez as Lorena
- Daniela Dos Santos as Laurita Palmero
- Eulices Alvarado as Elías Mujica "El Gato"
- Ever Bastidas as Leo Gutiérrez
- Viviana Majzoub as Jessica Iturriza
- Carlos Daniel Alvarado as Tito Pérez
- Alejandro Grossmann as Randy Palmero
