= Mempo Giardinelli =

Argentine novelist and academic

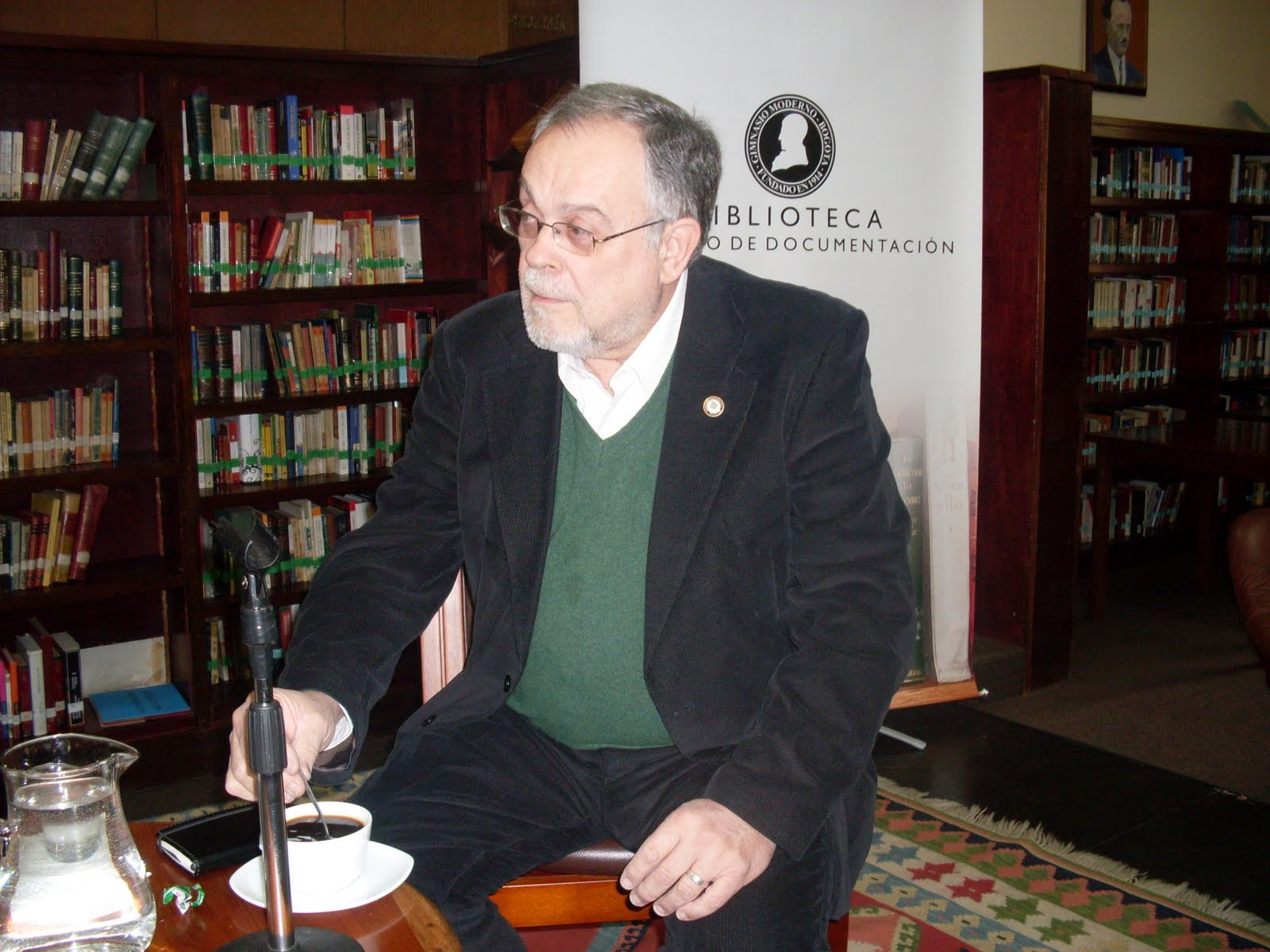
- Born: August 2, 1947 (age 79); Resistencia, Argentina
- Occupations: Novelist, Journalist, Academic
- Years active: Since 1980
- Awards: Premio Nacional de Novela (Mexico, 1983); Rómulo Gallegos Prize (1993); Premio Grandes Viajeros (Spain, 2000); Doctorate honoris causa, University of Poitiers (2007); Grinzane Cavour Prize (2007); Giuseppe Acerbi Book Award (Italy, 2009)
- Website: Fundación Mempo Giardinelli

Mempo Giardinelli (born August 2, 1947) is an Argentine novelist and academic, author of numerous books, including novels, essay collections, and short story collections.

== Biography ==
Giardinelli was born in Resistencia, Chaco Province. He enrolled at the National University of the Northeast, in neighboring Corrientes, in 1964. He enrolled in Law School, but left his law studies in 1969 to pursue writing and journalism. Giardinelli emigrated to Mexico following the March 1976 coup in Argentina; there, he taught journalism at the Ibero-American University from 1978 to 1984, and contributed to Mexico City-based business magazines Expansión and Forum. He became the first foreign writer to win Mexico's National Novelists' Prize in 1983 for his thriller, Luna Caliente.

Following elections in 1983 Giardinelli returned to Argentina. His novel Luna Caliente, a romantic thriller set in subtropical Corrientes during a heat wave, was adapted into film in 1985. He worked as Assistant Director at Playboy Magazine Argentina until 1985, covered the historic Trial of the Juntas, and later became a regular contributor to Página/12. Giardinelli founded a literary review, Puro Cuento ('Pure Fiction'), in 1986, and edited the review until its closure in 1992. He won the 1993 Rómulo Gallegos Prize (Venezuela) for his novel Santo Oficio de la Memoria.

Giardinelli taught journalism in a number of universities, including the National University of La Plata (1989-94), the National University of the Northeast, and as visiting professor at among others the University of Virginia (from 1988) and the University of California, San Diego (2002-07). He served in the advisory councils of both the Ministry of Education's Reading Promotion Plan (from 2004) and Transparency International (2005-08). He was awarded an honorary doctorate at the University of Poitiers in 2007. Giardinelli relocated to his native Resistencia in 1995, where he established a foundation in his name in 1996 with 10,000 volumes donated from his personal library.

== Works ==
=== Novels ===
- La revolución en bicicleta (1980)
- El cielo con las manos (1981)
- ¿Por qué prohibieron el circo? (1983)
- Luna caliente (1983)
- Qué solos se quedan los muertos (1985)
- Santo Oficio de la Memoria (1991)
- Imposible equilibrio (1995)
- El décimo infierno (1999)
- Final de novela en Patagonia (2000)
- Cuestiones interiores (2003)
- Visitas después de hora (2001)
- La última felicidad de Bruno Fólner (2015); English: Bruno Fólner's Last Tango, translated by Rhonda Dahl Buchanan (2020)
- Esto nunca existió (2022); English: This Never Happened, translated by Rhonda Dahl Buchanan (2026)

=== Essays ===
- El Género Negro —Ensayo sobre novela policial— (Univ.Autónoma Metropolitana, México, DF, 1984 y 1998; Ediciones Op Oloop, Córdoba. Arg. 1999)
- "Así se escribe un cuento" —Ensayos y entrevistas— (Beas 1992, Patria México, 1998 y Punto de Lectura, 2001)
- El país de las maravillas Los argentinos en el Fin del Milenio (Planeta, Buenos Aires, 1998)
- Diatriba por la Patria. Apuntes sobre la disolución de la Argentina (Ediciones B, Buenos Aires, 2002)
- México: el exilio que hemos vivido —Memoria del exilio argentino en México durante la dictadura 1976-1983.. En colaboración con Jorge Luis Bernetti. (Universidad Nacional de Quilmes, 2003)
- Los argentinos y sus intelectuales. (Capital Intelectual, Buenos Aires, 2004)
- "Volver a leer. Propuestas para ser un país de lectores (Edhasa, Buenos Aires, 2006)

=== Stories ===
- Vidas ejemplares (1982)
- Cuentos-Antología Personal (1987)
- Carlitos Dancing Bar (1992)
- El castigo de Dios (1993)
- Cuentos Completos (1999)
- Gente rara. La Plata: Ediciones Al Margen, 2005. 136 p.
- Estación Coghlan y otros cuentos. Buenos Aires: Ediciones B, 2005. 224 p.
- Luminoso amarillo y otros cuentos (La Habana 2005 / Caracas 2007 / Montevideo 2008)
- Soñario (2008)
- 9 Historias de amor (2009)

Cuentos para niños

- Luli la viajera (1988)
- Luli, una gatita de ciudad (2000)
- Cuentos con mi papá (2004)
- El Cheruvichá (2007)
- Celeste y la dinosauria en el jardín (2007)
- Celeste y el girasol (2009)

=== Poetry ===
- Invasión. Buenos Aires: Noé, 1973. 49 p.
- Concierto de poesía a dos voces. En colaboración con Fernando Operé. Resistencia: FMG, 2004. 80 p.
