= Príncipe (Ceuta) =

Neighborhood in Ceuta, northern Africa

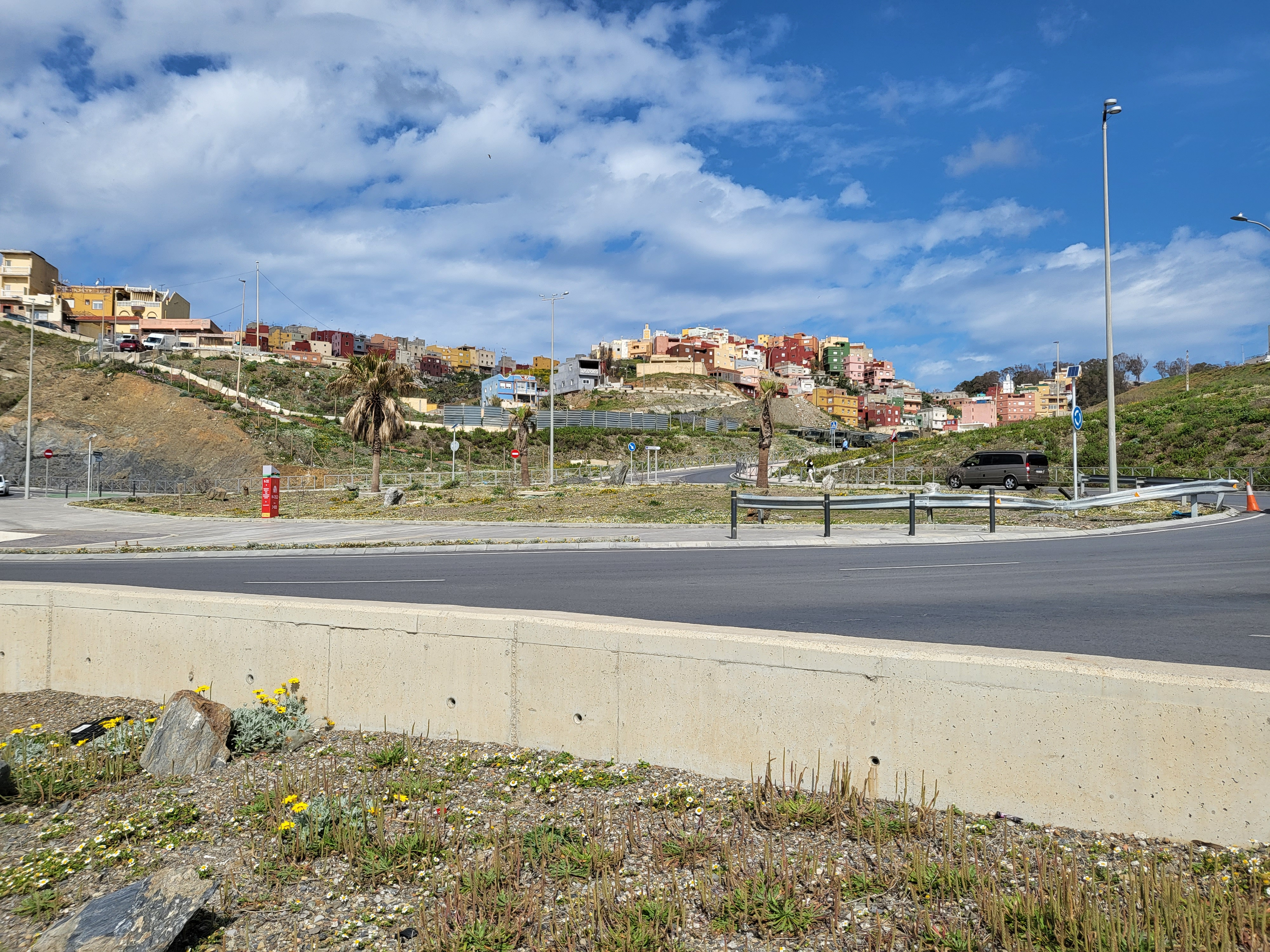
Barrio del Príncipe, Ceuta, Spain.

Príncipe (Spanish: Barrio del Príncipe, Barrio del Príncipe Alfonso) is a working-class neighborhood in the south of the Spanish exclave city of Ceuta in northwest Africa. It has a majority Muslim population. It is linked to the centre of Ceuta by the N-352 highway, which also goes south to the border crossing with Morocco.

Ceuta's University Hospital is in this neighbourhood.

The television series El Príncipe is set in Principe.

As of 2015, there were about 12,000 residents, and almost all were Muslim.

In the 1990s the neighbourhood became a centre of drug trading. According to the Ceuta government, as of 2015, Principe receives 40% of the city's social aid budget. As of that year 80% of residents had no jobs.
