= Alicia Rubio =

Spanish actress

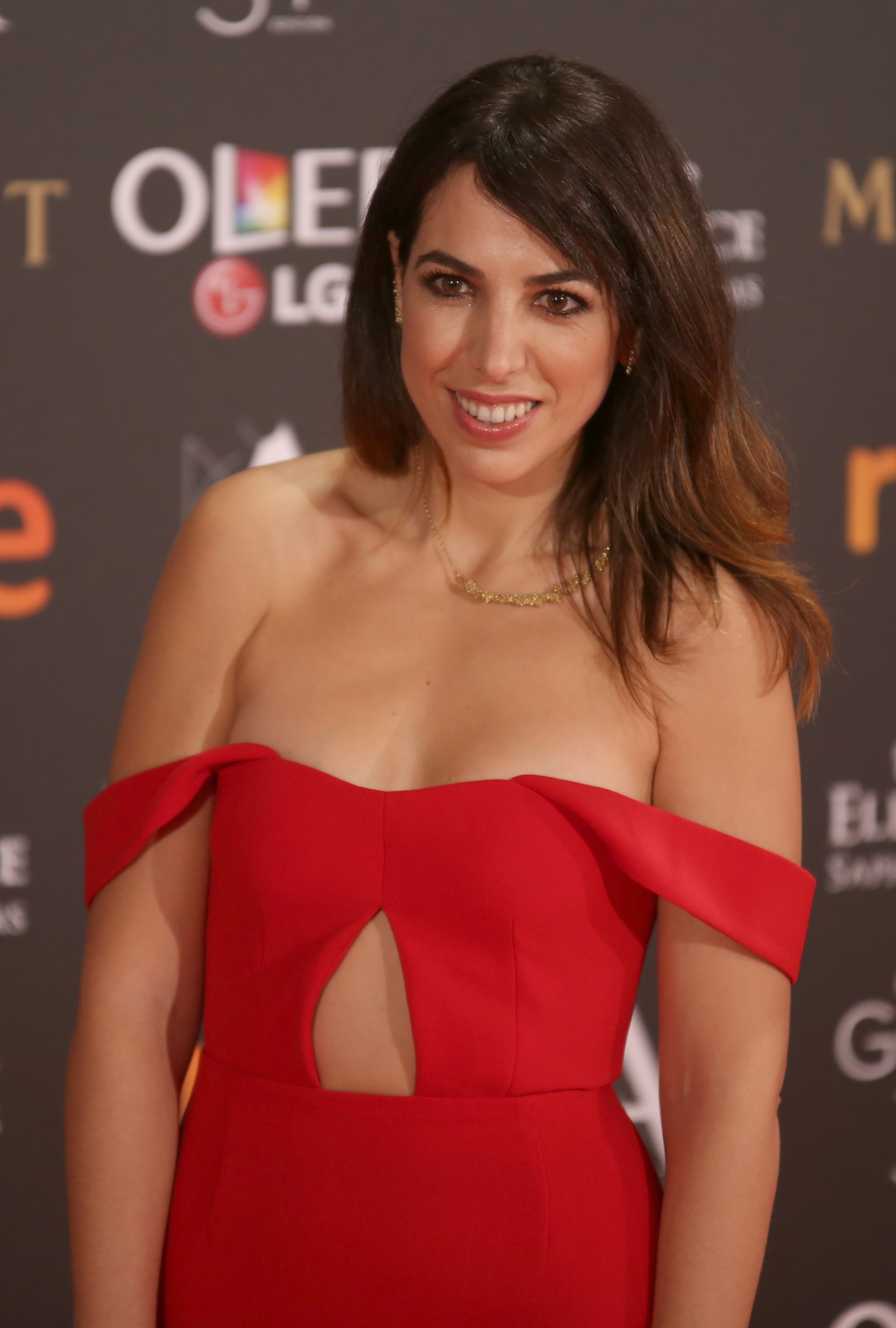
- Alicia Rubio in 2017
- Born: 15 September 1986 (age 39); Madrid, Spain
- Occupation: Actress
- Years active: 2006-present

Alicia Rubio (Madrid, September 15, 1986) is a Spanish film, theater and television actress.

== Biography ==
Rubio trained at the prestigious school of dramatic art directed by Juan Carlos Corazza, which was also the school of actors such as Javier Bardem, Elena Anaya and Pilar López de Ayala. She trained with various teachers such as Julio Chávez and Claudio Tolcachir. She had her first opportunities on the small screen participating in series including Mesa para cinco, Alquilados and Cuestión de sexo.

In cinema, she made her first appearances in the films 8 citas, by Peris Romano and Rodrigo Sorogoyen; and After, by Alberto Rodríguez Librero. In 2012 she participated as a supporting actress in Daniel Sánchez Arévalo's film Primos; she played Toña, a nurse and girlfriend of José Miguel's character (Adrián Lastra).

In 2013, she joined the eighth season of the daily afternoon series Amar es para siempre, aired daily on Antena 3. Rubio played the role of Macarena, a young law student at a time when it was not common for women to study. Also that year she had a small role in Daniel Sánchez Arévalo's film La gran familia española. For this performance she won the award for best supporting actress at the Actors Union Awards.

In 2014, after leaving Amar es para siempre, Rubio participated in eight episodes of the Cuatro series Ciega a citas, where she played Alegría.

In 2015 she returned to television with the series Algo que celebrar, of Antena 3, which only ran for one season due to its low audience figures. She also participated in the first season of the series Mar de plástico with an episodic character. In addition, she appeared in a film by directed by María Ripoll, Ahora o Nunca, starring María Valverde and Dani Rovira.

In 2016 she appeared in the film Tarde para la ira, directed by her partner of ten years, actor Raúl Arévalo.

Rubio has appeared in numerous theatrical productions throughout her career. She participated in the play Los miércoles no existen, directed by Maite Peréz Astorga and Peris Romano. She has also appeared in the play Dentro y Fuera, written and directed by Víctor García León; Cuatro estaciones y un día, co-starring Sergio Mur at the Teatro Lara and directed by Miguel Ángel Cárcano; Muere, Numancia, muere, written by Carlos Be and directed by Sonia Sebastián; Pequeña Pieza Psicopática, directed by Hernán Gristenin; Los trapos sucios directed by Ana López-Segovia; and Juventudes directed by Natxo López.

Rubio has also appeared in several short films, including Sinceridad, directed by Paco Caballero, in which she starred alongside Raúl Arévalo and for which she won the award for best actress at the prestigious Cortogenia festival in 2010. She also participated in Cristales and De noche y de pronto, a short film that was nominated for the Goya awards in 2014.

== Filmography ==
=== Cinema ===
Year	Title	Character	Directed by
2008	8 citas	Novia	Peris Romano and Rodrigo Sorogoyen
2009	After	Laura	Alberto Rodríguez Librero
2011	Primos	Toña	Daniel Sánchez Arévalo
2013	La gran familia espYearla	Marisa	Daniel Sánchez Arévalo
2014	Las ovejas no pierden el tren	Vanesa	Álvaro Fernández Armero
2015	Ahora o nunca	Belén	María Ripoll
2016	La Bruja	Teresa	Justin Price
2016	Tarde para la ira	Carmen	Raúl Arévalo
2017	Selfie	Alicia	Víctor García León

=== Television ===
Year	Title	Character	Channel	Duration
2009	Cuestión de sexo	Ana	Cuatro	1 episode
2009	La parejita	Emilia	El Jueves	59 episodes
2013	Amar es para siempre	Macarena Ponce	Antena 3	165 episodes
2014	Ciega a citas	Alegría	Cuatro	8 episodes
2015	Mar de plástico	Esther Ruiz	Antena 3	1 episode
2015	Algo que celebrar	Mariví González	Antena 3	8 episodes
2017	Tiempos de guerra	Verónica Montellano	Antena 3	13 episodes
2018 - 2021	Pequeñas coincidencias	Elisa	Amazon Prime Video	30 episodes
2020	#Luimelia	Ingrid	Atresplayer	1 episode
2021	HIT	Eva	La 1	10 episodes

== Awards and nominations ==
Cortogenia

Year	Category	Film	Result	Ref.
2010	Best female performance	Sinceridad	Won	

Spanish Actors Union

Year	Category	Film	Result	Ref.
2013	Best Supporting Actress in a Motion Picture	La gran familia española	Won	

== Personal life ==
For ten years Rubio was romantically involved with actor and director Raúl Arévalo, with whom she has co-starred on more than one occasion on the big screen.
