= Upiro =

2026 Spanish supernatural horror film

- Theatrical release poster
- Directed by: Óscar Martín
- Screenplay by: Elena Muñoz
- Produced by: Elena Muñoz; Diego Rodriguez
- Starring: Pauline Brisy; Victoria Cerrada; Diego Anido
- Cinematography: Alberto Morago
- Edited by: Luis de la Madrid; Carlos De Visa
- Music by: Gary Moonboots
- Production companies: El Ojo Mecánico; La Charito Films; OKAYSS
- Distributed by: SelectaVisión
- Release dates: 18 September 2026 (Fantastic Fest); 19 February 2027 (Spain)
- Running time: 106 minutes
- Countries: Spain; Belgium
- Language: Spanish

Upiro is a 2026 historical thriller supernatural horror film directed by Óscar Martín. Inspired by the first documented case of vampirism in the Iberian Peninsula as documented by the Catholic Church, it follows Ana, who is sent to a remote monastery to atone for her sins.

The film had its world premiere in Fantastic Fest on 18 September 2026.

== Synopsis ==
Inspired by a historical case reportedly recognized by the Catholic Church as vampirism, the film explores the clash between superstition and the ideas of the Enlightenment.

Set in Spain in 1755, the film follows Ana, a young woman who is sent to an isolated monastery where several novices are suffering from a mysterious blood disease. An unconventional Franciscan priest investigates the strange events and suspects that an ancient supernatural force is responsible. As Ana becomes caught between religious faith, desire and fear, the monastery is threatened by a bloodthirsty vampire-like presence.

== Cast ==
- Pauline Brisy as Ana
- Victoria Cerrada as Remedios
- Diego Anido as Father Rubis
- María Galiana
- Javier Botet
- Enrique Martínez
- Teresa Del Omo
- Tania Santana
- Jaume Balaguero
- Juanjo Puigcorbé
- Ascen López
- Elena Villalba
- Lorea Intxausti
- María Márnez
- Andrea López

== Production ==
The project was a triple winner at Ventana Sur's 2021 Blood Window, it won the invitations to the next Sitges Pitchbox and Network of Asian Fantastic Films and BIFAN Industry Gathering at Bucheon International Fantastic Film Festival and Cine Qua Non Lab prize of initial script analysis, a consultancy and a follow-up session valued at $3,000.

In April 2023, the project featured in the Proof of Concept Presentation at the Frontières Platform, set up at Cannes by Marché du Film, co-organised with the Fantasia International Film Festival. In August 2023, it was selected in 2023 Sanfic-Mórbido Lab lineup at Santiago International Film Festival.

In February 2025, Wallimage fund of Belgium supported the film which is co-produced by Belgian production company Okayss.

In December 2025, the film got the selective support of €675,000 from Institute of Cinematography and Audiovisual Arts.

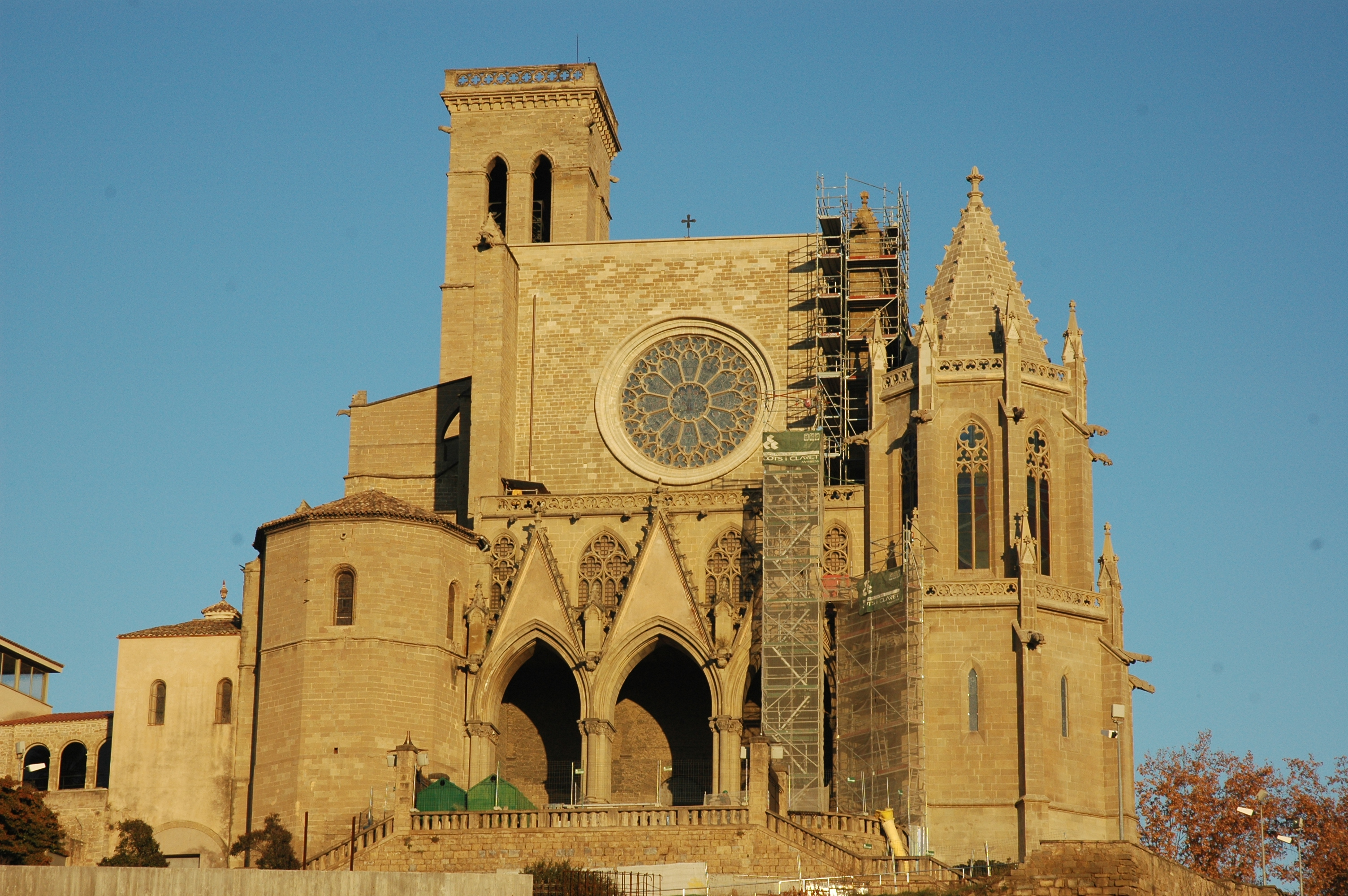
Santa Maria, Manresa, one of the location of the film

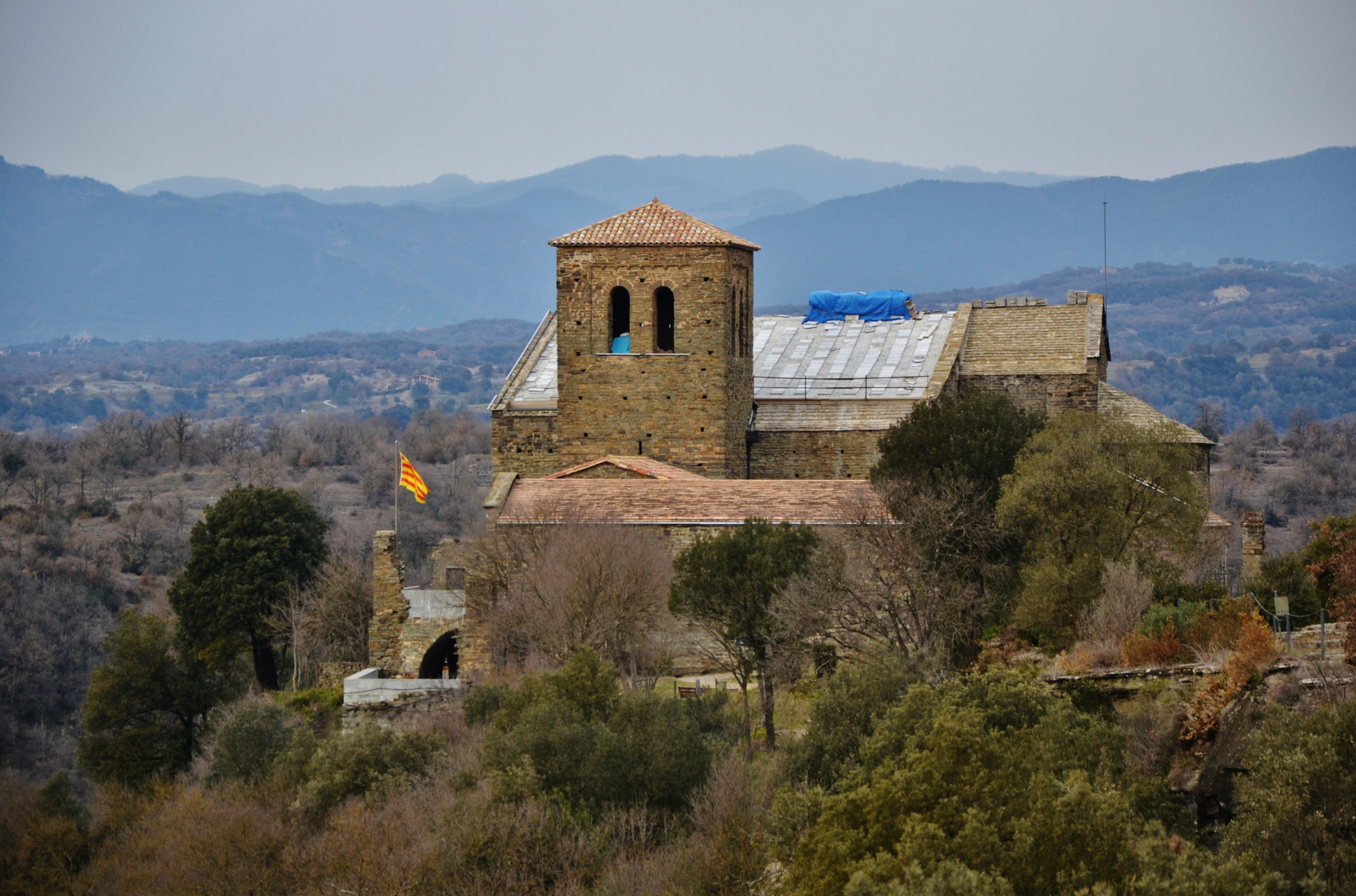
Sant Pere de Casserres, another location of the film

The film shot in May 2025 for four weeks in locations around old Catalan landmarks, including the Convent of Sant Francesc de Paula, the Santa Maria, Manresa, and the Sant Pere de Casserres, uses rich, detailed visuals to strengthen its gothic and supernatural setting.

== Release ==
Upiro had its world premiere in Fantastic Fest on 18 September 2026, and its West Coast Premiere at the Beyond Fest on 28 September 2026.

Subsequently it competed in Official Fantastic In-Competition Selection on 11 October 2026 at the 59th Sitges Film Festival.

The film will be released in Spanish theatres by SelectaVisión on 19 February 2027.
