= María Ripoll =

Spanish film director from Barcelona

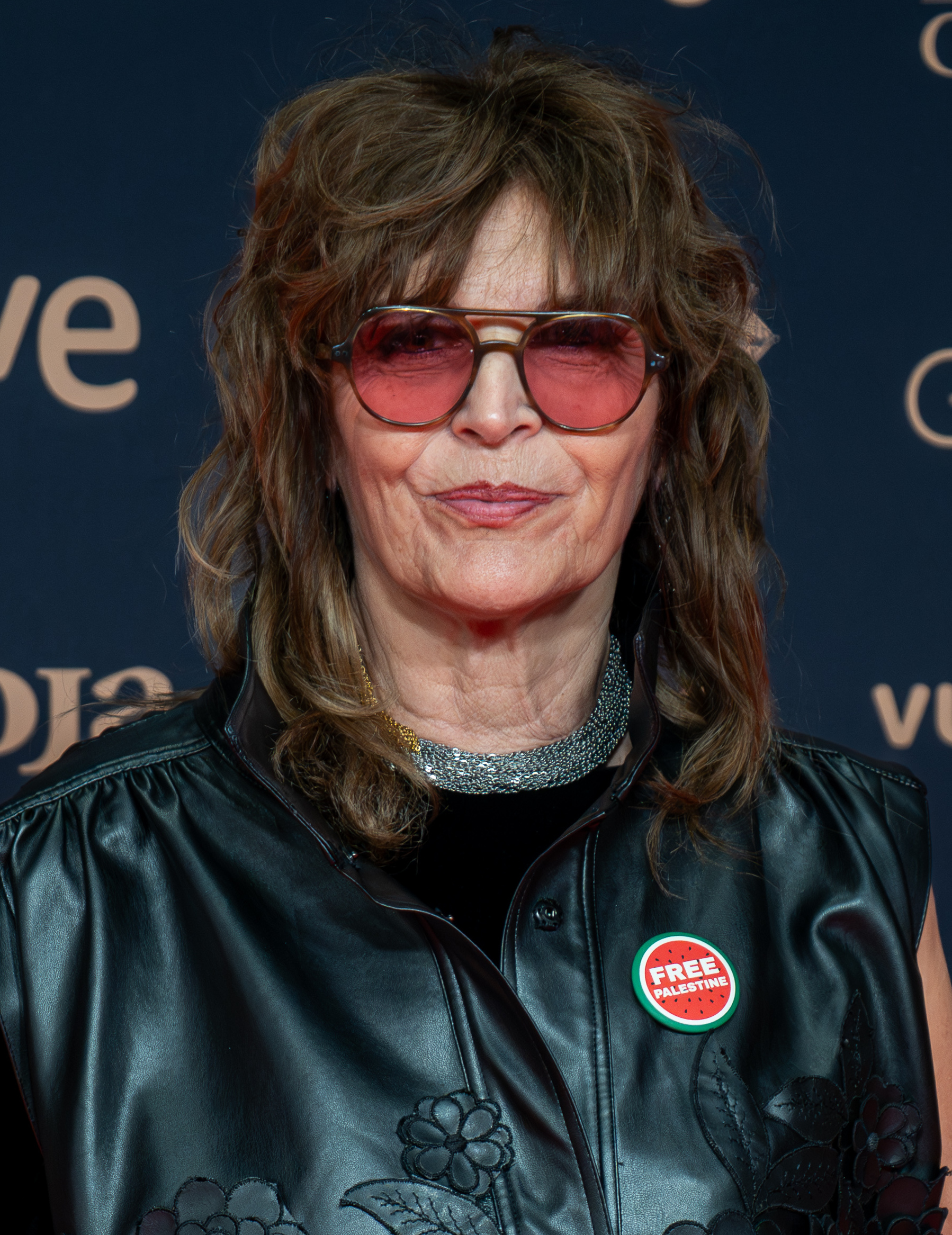
- Ripoll in 2026
- Born: Maria Ripoll Julià; 1963 (age 62–63); Barcelona, Spain
- Occupation: Director

Maria Ripoll Julià (born 1963) is a Spanish film director from Barcelona, with an international background and eight feature films to her credit. The success of her film It's Now or Never placed her as the highest-grossing Spanish female film director to that date.

== Early life and career beginnings ==
Born in Barcelona, Ripoll studied screenwriting in Los Angeles at the American Film Institute (AFI), where she shot the short film Kill Me Later.

== Directing career ==
Her first feature-length film, The Man with Rain in His Shoes starring Lena Headey, Douglas Henshall and Penélope Cruz won Best Screenplay at the Montreal World Film Festival, the Audience Award at the Sitges Film Festival, the Seattle Women’s Film Festival. It led to Ripoll being nominated for a Goya Award for Best New Director.

She then directed Tortilla Soup in Los Angeles starring Hector Elizondo, Jacqueline Obradors, Raquel Welch and Elizabeth Peña. Produced by Samuel Goldwyn Jr, it was a noted success, breaking Latin American stereotypes on its way to nine nominations at the ALMA Awards. She then shot a documentary in New York, WITNESS: Cameras Against Violence, for Canal Plus.

On her return to Spain, Ripoll shot her third feature film Utopia, which enters the terrain of the fantastic thriller and premiered in 2003. In Barcelona she then directed Your Life in 65, a film based on the play by Albert Espinosa. This film was invited to numerous festivals, including the AFI Los Angeles Film Festival and the Stockholm International Film Festival and was another success in Spain. For Televisión Española (TVE) she directed Fame, Everything for a Dream and then turned to producing as well as directing Chromosome 5, a documentary for TVE. It was well received in Spain and around the world, earning Best Picture in the Bosifest-Belgrade film festival amongst others.

In 2014 she directed the indie drama Traces of Sandalwood starring Aina Clotet, a film shot in Mumbai and Barcelona in Hindi, English and Catalan. The film won the Gaudí Award in 2014 for best film and the Audience Award at the Montreal and Cinequest Festivals.

Her next film, It's Now or Never premiered in June 2015. This romantic comedy starring Dani Rovira, Maria Valverde and Clara Lago was a summer blockbuster and turned Ripoll into Spain’s most successful and highest-grossing female film director in Spanish history. The film has been screened at the Montreal, Toronto and Miami Films Festivals.

Her most recent film, the romantic comedy Don't Blame the Karma for Being an Idiot starring Verónica Echegui and Álex García, was based on the best-selling book with the same name. It premiered in November 2016, reaching number 1 in Spain during its second week and screening at the Miami Film Festival in March 2017.

== Selected filmography ==
- El fantasma de mi mujer (2026)
- También esto pasará (2025)
- Yo no soy esa (2024)
- We Won't Kill Each Other with Guns (2022)
- Live Twice, Love Once (2019)
- Don't Blame the Karma for Being an Idiot (2016)
- It's Now or Never (2015)
- Traces of Sandalwood (2014)
- Utopia (2003)
- Tortilla Soup (2001)
- The Man with Rain in His Shoes (1998)

== Awards and nominations ==
Year	Award	Category	Result	Work	Ref.
2000	14th Goya Awards	Best New Director	The Man with Rain in His Shoes	Nominated	
