= The Mortimers =

- Theatrical release poster
- Spanish: Los Muértimer
- Directed by: Álvaro Fernández Armero
- Screenplay by: Jelen Morales
- Based on: Les Croques by Léa Mazé
- Produced by: Ghislain Barrois; Álvaro Augustin; Carolina Bang; Álex de la Iglesia
- Starring: Diego Montejo; Iratxe Emparan; Melani; Belén Rueda; Alexandra Jiménez; Víctor Clavijo; Fele Martínez
- Edited by: Raúl de Torres
- Music by: Vanessa Garde
- Production companies: Telecinco Cinema; Pokeepsie Films; Pokeepsietxea
- Distributed by: Paramount Pictures
- Release date: 14 August 2025
- Country: Spain
- Language: Spanish

The Mortimers (Spanish: Los Muértimer) is a 2025 Spanish mystery comedy film directed by Álvaro Fernández Armero from a screenplay by Jelen Morales based on the comic book series Les Croques by Léa Mazé. It stars Diego Montejo and Iratxe Emparan.

== Plot ==
Bullied teen Nico, along with French exchange program student Gabrielle and the former's bullies Marc, Sofía, and Raquel unravel a jewelry theft plot connected to the local cemetery.

== Cast ==
- Diego Montejo as Nico Mortimer
- Iratxe Emparan as Gabrielle
- Melani as Raquel
- Adrián Checa as Marc
- Bruna González as Sofía
- Pepe Lorente as Pol
- Belén Rueda
- Alexandra Jiménez as Marisa
- Víctor Clavijo as Sebastián Mortimer
- Fele Martínez

== Production ==
The film was produced by Telecinco Cinema, Pokeepsie Films, and Pokeepsietxea, and it had the participation of Mediaset España, Movistar Plus+, Diputación Foral de Bizkaia, and Mediterráneo Mediaset España Group. Shooting locations in Biscay included Orduña.

== Release ==
The Mortimers is set to be released theatrically in Spain on 14 August 2025 by Paramount Pictures. Filmax purchased international rights to the film.

== Reception ==
Javier Ocaña of El País wrote that the film "suffers from an alarming visual homogenization" and the performances "from a worrying lack of tonal cohesion", otherwise pointing out that the film "seems to have been made without any love for the source material".

== See also ==
- List of Spanish films of 2025
