= Death Inc. =

Spanish dark comedy television series

- Spanish: Muertos S.L.
- Genre: Black comedy; Sitcom
- Created by: Laura Caballero; Daniel Deorador; Julián Sastre; Nando Abad; Araceli Álvarez de Sotomayor
- Starring: Carlos Areces; Ascen López; Diego Martín; Amaia Salamanca; Salva Reina; Adriana Torrebejano; Gerald B. Fillmore; Aitziber Garmendia; Roque Ruiz; Lorea Intxausti; Manolo Cal; Bárbara Santa-Cruz; Lucía Quintana; Juan Miguel Bataller
- Country of origin: Spain
- Original language: Spanish
- No. of seasons: 4
- No. of episodes: 26

Production
- Executive producers: Alberto Caballero; Susana Herreras
- Cinematography: Juan Luis Cabellos
- Camera setup: Single-camera
- Running time: 26-33 minutes
- Production company: Contubernio Films

Original release
- Network: Movistar Plus+
- Release: 4 April 2024 – 30 January 2025
- Network: Netflix
- Release: 21 August 2025 – 7 August 2026

Death Inc. (Spanish: Muertos S.L.), is a Spanish black comedy television series created by Laura Caballero, Daniel Deorador, Julián Sastre, Nando Abad and Araceli Álvarez de Sotomayo. The plot centers on the power struggle that unfolds after the founder dies without naming a successor.

The series premiered on 4 April 2024 on Movistar Plus+. It was renewed for a second season, which followed later that year. In early 2025, Netflix acquired the global rights, releasing the first two seasons on 31 July 2025. The series was renewed by Netflix for a third season, which premiered exclusively on 21 August 2025. The fourth and final season premiered on 7 August 2026.

== Premise ==
In the first season, the employees of the Torregrosa Funeral Home deal with the death of its founder and owner, Gonzálo Torregrosa. Gonzálo's sales agent, Dámaso Carrillo seems certain that he will take control of the company until Gonzálo's widow Nieves decides to run it aided by her hapless but enthusiastic son-in-law, Chemi, and against her daughters' plans to close the funeral home and open a gym. While Dámaso conspires and manipulates his colleagues against the new management, the company faces competition from the Transitus Funeral Home and its expansion plans, as well as a #MeToo case that threatens Gonzalo's legacy.

In the second season Nieves struggles with the revelation of Gonzalo's indiscretions while running the funeral home with the help of Chemi, who continues to launch short-lived schemes that backfire on Torregrosa. Dámaso suspects that Gonzalo is his biological father. Dámaso's apprentice, Pablo, enters into a sexual relationship with Vanesa, Dámaso's main rival from Transitus.

In the third season, Nieves hands the directorship of Torregrosa to Vanesa, but remains as an employee to keep herself busy. Vanesa struggles to keep Chemi and his schemes at bay, while Dámaso undermines Vanesa by exposing his affair with Pablo to the staff, resulting in Vanesa's dismissal.

In the fourth season, Nieves decides on whether Dámaso or Chemi will become the next director of Torregrosa. Vanesa plots revenge against Dámaso.

Torregrossa’s staff also face struggles of their own. The dour and morbidly-minded mortician, Abel, tries to date the superstitious and hypochondriac receptionist, Olivia. His fellow mortician, Manuela, tries to maintain order, but continues to obsess about her near-death experience. Nino, the hearse driver, barely gets through with his alcoholism. The elderly cremator, Anselmo, awaits retirement. The bartender, Laiya, proposes having sex with anyone who would listen. A missing employee, Carmen, remains on leave.

== Cast and characters ==
Character	Portrayed by	Seasons			
Character	Portrayed by	1	2	3	4
Dámaso Carrillo	Carlos Areces	Main	Main	Main	Main
Abel Aguado	Gerald B. Fillmore	Main	Main	Main	Main
Olivia	Aitziber Garmendia	Main	Main	Main	Main
Nieves Torralba	Ascen López	Main	Main	Main	Main
José Miguel "Chemi" Fondao	Diego Martín	Main	Main	Main	Main
Nino	Salva Reina	Main	Main	Main	Main
Pablo Morales	Roque Ruiz	Main	Main	Main	Main
Vanesa Hernández	Amaia Salamanca	Main	Main	Main	Main
Manuela	Adriana Torrebejano	Main	Main	Main	Main
Anselmo	Manolo Cal	Main	Main	Main	Main
Laia	Lorea Intxausti	Main	Main	Main	Main
Pilar Torregrosa Torralba	Bárbara Santa-Cruz	Main	Main	Main	Main
Milagros Torregrosa Torralba	Lucía Quintana	Main	Main	Main	Main

== Episodes ==
Series	Episodes	Originally released		
Series	Episodes	First released	Last released	Network
1	8	4 April 2024	25 April 2024	Movistar Plus+
2	6	16 January 2025	30 January 2025	Movistar Plus+
3	6	21 August 2025		Netflix
4	6	7 August 2026		Netflix

=== Season 1 (2024) ===
No. overall	No. in series	Episode	Directed by	Written by	Original release date
1	1	"Episode 1"	Laura Caballero	Alberto Caballero, Daniel Deorador, Julián Sastre & Nando Abad	4 April 2024
Gonzalo Torregrosa passes away; Dámaso plans a takeover but faces Nieves, the widow.
2	2	"Episode 2"	Laura Caballero	Alberto Caballero, Daniel Deorador, Julián Sastre & Nando Abad	4 April 2024
Nieves runs the funeral home; Chemi introduces unconventional ideas, upsetting Dámaso.
3	3	"Episode 3"	Laura Caballero	Alberto Caballero, Daniel Deorador, Julián Sastre & Nando Abad	11 April 2024
Dámaso tries to undermine Nieves; Chemi’s marketing clashes with tradition.
4	4	"Episode 4"	Laura Caballero	Alberto Caballero, Daniel Deorador, Julián Sastre & Nando Abad	11 April 2024
Staff tensions rise; Chemi faces resistance and Dámaso’s schemes intensify.
5	5	"Episode 5"	Laura Caballero	Alberto Caballero, Daniel Deorador, Julián Sastre & Nando Abad	18 April 2024
A #MeToo case threatens the funeral home; staff face conflicts and external pressure.
6	6	"Episode 6"	Laura Caballero	Alberto Caballero, Daniel Deorador, Julián Sastre & Nando Abad	18 April 2024
Chemi uses social media to promote the home; Vanesa offers to buy Torregrosa.
7	7	"Episode 7"	Laura Caballero	Alberto Caballero, Daniel Deorador, Julián Sastre & Nando Abad	25 April 2024
Team-building trip; Manuela and Nino search for Don Gonzalo’s secret hideaway.
8	8	"Episode 8"	Laura Caballero	Alberto Caballero, Daniel Deorador, Julián Sastre & Nando Abad	25 April 2024
Tragedy hits; Dámaso has a crisis while rumors of a takeover spread.

=== Season 2 (2025) ===
No. overall	No. in series	Episode	Directed by	Written by	Original release date
9	1	"Episode 1"	Laura Caballero	Alberto Caballero, Daniel Deorador, Julián Sastre & Nando Abad	16 January 2025
Dámaso questions his lineage and seeks proof of connection to the Torregrosa family.
10	2	"Episode 2"	Laura Caballero	Alberto Caballero, Daniel Deorador, Julián Sastre & Nando Abad	19 January 2025
The funeral home faces competition; Dámaso’s leadership is challenged and conflicts rise.
11	3	"Episode 3"	Laura Caballero	Alberto Caballero, Daniel Deorador, Julián Sastre & Nando Abad	26 January 2025
Dámaso’s past resurfaces; staff struggle with personal and professional issues.
12	4	"Episode 4"	Laura Caballero	Alberto Caballero, Daniel Deorador, Julián Sastre & Nando Abad	26 January 2025
A new competitor threatens business; staff must adapt to survive.
13	5	"Episode 5"	Laura Caballero	Alberto Caballero, Daniel Deorador, Julián Sastre & Nando Abad	30 January 2025
Chemi’s personal life complicates work; Manuela helps Abel with love life.
14	6	"Episode 6"	Laura Caballero	Alberto Caballero, Daniel Deorador, Julián Sastre & Nando Abad	30 January 2025
Staff face a moral dilemma with lasting consequences for the funeral home.

=== Season 3 (2025) ===
No. overall	No. in series	Episode	Directed by	Written by	Original release date
15	1	"Episode 1"	Laura Caballero	Alberto Caballero, Daniel Deorador, Julián Sastre & Nando Abad	21 August 2025
Vanesa takes over as director; Dámaso and staff adjust to her leadership.
16	2	"Episode 2"	Laura Caballero	Alberto Caballero, Daniel Deorador, Julián Sastre & Nando Abad	21 August 2025
Dámaso plots to undermine Vanesa; Chemi causes disruptions in the team.
17	3	"Episode 3"	Laura Caballero	Alberto Caballero, Daniel Deorador, Julián Sastre & Nando Abad	21 August 2025
A crisis forces staff cooperation; personal and professional lines blur.
18	4	"Episode 4"	Laura Caballero	Alberto Caballero, Daniel Deorador, Julián Sastre & Nando Abad	21 August 2025
Vanesa’s decisions are questioned; staff confront leadership over concerns.
19	5	"Episode 5"	Laura Caballero	Alberto Caballero, Daniel Deorador, Julián Sastre & Nando Abad	21 August 2025
Chemi faces consequences of his actions; team relationships are tested.
20	6	"Episode 6"	Laura Caballero	Alberto Caballero, Daniel Deorador, Julián Sastre & Nando Abad	21 August 2025
Chemi spirals after a friend’s death; Dámaso reveals shocking secrets to Manuela.

=== Season 4 (2026) ===
No. overall	No. in series	Episode	Directed by	Written by	Original release date
21	1	"Episode 1"	Laura Caballero	Alberto Caballero, Daniel Deorador, Julián Sastre & Nando Abad	7 August 2026
Dámaso and Chemi vie to become director; sibling clients bicker on how to dispose of a body.
22	2	"Episode 2"	Laura Caballero	Alberto Caballero, Daniel Deorador, Julián Sastre & Nando Abad	7 August 2026
Chemi introduces a series of hare-brained schemes; a client tries out one of them.
23	3	"Episode 3"	Laura Caballero	Alberto Caballero, Daniel Deorador, Julián Sastre & Nando Abad	7 August 2026
Chemi pitches cryonics. Dámaso has a date with Pablo’s mother. Manuela struggles to recall a deceased client. Abel has a new girlfriend.
24	4	"Episode 4"	Laura Caballero	Alberto Caballero, Daniel Deorador, Julián Sastre & Nando Abad	7 August 2026
Pablo’s contract at Torregrossa is about to expire; a client requests a funeral for her pet guinea pig.
25	5	"Episode 5"	Laura Caballero	Alberto Caballero, Daniel Deorador, Julián Sastre & Nando Abad	7 August 2026
Chemi plans to hire non-Caucasian staff to make the workplace diverse; a client requests a funeral for his amputated leg.
26	6	"Episode 6"	Laura Caballero	Alberto Caballero, Daniel Deorador, Julián Sastre & Nando Abad	7 August 2026
Chemi hires a black guy, introduces a mascot, and faces a staff revolt; the staff deal with a deceased client’s multiple romantic partners.

== Production ==
=== Development ===
On 17 April 2023, creators Alberto Caballero and Laura Caballero announced the development of a new comedy series titled Muertos S.L. in collaboration with their production company, Contubernio Films, for Movistar Plus+. The series was conceived as a dark comedy set in a funeral home, exploring themes of family dynamics, inheritance, and the absurdities of life and death.

Despite the initial renewal for a third season on Movistar Plus+, in July 2025, Netflix acquired the global distribution rights to the series. The first two seasons were rebranded as Death Inc. and released on Netflix on 31 July 2025. The third season premiered exclusively on the platform on 21 August 2025, marking the series' global debut.

=== Filming ===
The series was filmed in Spain, with production taking place in various locations to capture the authentic atmosphere of a funeral home setting.

== Release ==
Death Inc.'s first two seasons aired on Movistar Plus+ from April 2024 until January 2025. On 11 July 2025, Netflix acquired worldwide rights to the series' third season which premiered on 21 August 2025.

== Critical response ==
Death Inc. was met with positive reviews from critics. For the first season, Mikel Zorilla of Espinof wrote that the series is "the definitive confirmation that the Caballero brothers shine best with shorter lengths", and awarded it with a 7 out of 10 rating. Noé R. Rivas of Mindies praised the show's ensemble cast, stating that "each actor brings their own unique touch to the whole", and also spoke positively of the direction by Laura Caballero, as well as the "carefully crafted" set design and production. She concluded that the series "demonstrates the creative maturity of its creators, Alberto and Laura Caballero, who have managed to evolve and adapt to new times and platforms without losing their personal touch." She further added that with this project, "the Caballero siblings consolidate their position as key figures in Spanish television comedy, capable of reinventing themselves and exploring new genres without losing their essence."
