= The Burning Cold (film) =

- Theatrical release poster
- Spanish: El fred que crema
- Directed by: Santi Trullenque
- Screenplay by: Agustí Franch; Santi Trullenque
- Starring: Greta Fernández; Roger Casamajor; Adrià Collado; Pedro Casablanc; Daniel Horvath; Ksawery Szlenkier
- Cinematography: Àlex Sans
- Edited by: Marc Vendrell
- Music by: Francesc Gener
- Production companies: Films de l'Orient; Red Nose; Arlong Productions
- Distributed by: Filmax
- Release dates: 26 April 2022 (BCN Film Fest); 20 January 2023 (Spain)
- Countries: Spain; Andorra
- Language: Catalan

The Burning Cold (Catalan: El fred que crema) is a 2022 Spanish-Andorran historical drama film directed by Santi Trullenque from a screenplay by Agustí Franch and Trullenque which stars Greta Fernández and Roger Casamajor.

== Plot ==
Set in 1943 in Andorra against the backdrop of World War II, the plot follows a local couple (Sara and Antoni) facing a moral dilemma upon hiding Jews fleeing from the Nazis.

== Cast ==
- Greta Fernández as Sara
- Roger Casamajor as Antoni
- Adrià Collado as Joan
- Daniel Horvath as Lars
- Pedro Casablanc as Serafí
- Ksawery Szlenkier as Marian
- Elisabet Terri as Marieta

== Production ==
The Burning Cold was produced by Films de l'Orient, Red Nose and Arlong Productions, and it had the participation of TVC and backing from ICEC and the Government of Andorra. It was shot in Andorra and in the Pyrenees of the province of Lleida.

== Release ==
The film was presented at the BCN Film Fest on 26 April 2022. Distributed by Filmax, it was released theatrically in Spain on 20 January 2023.

== Reception ==
Àlex Montoya of Fotogramas rated the film 3 out of 5 stars highlighting "the visceral tone and mise-en-scène, the powerful use of landscapes and the leading duo" while lamenting certain melodramatic turn of the plot.

Toni Vall of Cinemanía rated the film 3 out of 5 stars, deeming it to be an "interesting debut, [a] story of war, helpless [people], good and evil".

Beatriz Martínez of El Periódico de Catalunya rated the film 3 out of 5 stars, deeming it to be "a rough and unpleasant film, like that icy landscape that becomes one more character in the film".

== Accolades ==
Year	Award	Category	Nominee(s)	Result	Ref.
2023	15th Gaudí Awards	Best Film		Nominated	

== See also ==
- List of Spanish films of 2023
