= The Art of Dying (film) =

- Theatrical release poster
- Spanish: El arte de morir
- Directed by: Álvaro Fernández Armero
- Screenplay by: Juan Vicente Pozuelo; Curro Royo
- Produced by: Francisco Ramos
- Starring: Fele Martínez; María Esteve; Gustavo Salmerón; Adrià Collado; Lucía Jiménez; Elsa Pataky; Sergio Peris-Mencheta
- Cinematography: Javier Salmones
- Edited by: Iván Aledo
- Music by: Bingen Mendizábal
- Release date: 31 March 2000
- Running time: 1h 42min
- Country: Spain
- Language: Spanish

The Art of Dying (Spanish: El arte de morir) is a 2000 Spanish horror film directed by Álvaro Fernández Armero from a screenplay by Juan Vicente Pozuelo and Curro Royo. It stars Fele Martínez, María Esteve, Gustavo Salmerón, Adrià Collado, Lucía Jiménez, Elsa Pataky, and Sergio Peris-Mencheta

== Cast ==
- Fele Martínez as Iván
- María Esteve as Clara
- Gustavo Salmerón as Nacho
- Adrià Collado as Carlos
- Lucía Jiménez as Patricia
- Elsa Pataky as Candela
- Sergio Peris-Mencheta as Ramón
- Emilio Gutiérrez Caba as Quintana

== Release ==
The film was theatrically released in Spain on 31 March 2000.

== Accolades ==
Year	Award	Category	Nominee(s)	Result	Ref.
2001	15th Goya Awards	Best Original Song	Cristina Lliso, Suso Saiz, Tito Fargo	Nominated	
2001	15th Goya Awards	Best Special Effects	Reyes Abades, Félix Bergés	Nominated	

== See also ==
- List of Spanish films of 2000
