= For the Good of Others =

- Film poster
- Spanish: El mal ajeno
- Directed by: Oskar Santos
- Written by: Daniel Sánchez Arévalo
- Produced by: Alejandro Amenabar
- Starring: Eduardo Noriega; Belén Rueda
- Release date: 12 February 2010 (Berlinale)
- Running time: 107 minutes
- Country: Spain
- Language: Spanish

For the Good of Others (Spanish: El mal ajeno, lit. 'The evil of others') is a 2010 Spanish drama film directed by Oskar Santos.

== Cast ==
- Eduardo Noriega as Dr. Diego Sanz
- Belén Rueda as Isabel
- Angie Cepeda as Sara
- Cristina Plazas as Pilar
- Clara Lago as Ainhoa
- Marcel Borràs as Juanjo
- Carlos Leal as Armand
- Luis Callejo as Carlos
- José Ángel Egido as Vicente
- Chema Ruiz as Héctor

== Production ==
The film is a Telecinco Cinema, MOD Producciones and Himenóptero production.

== See also ==
- List of Spanish films of 2010
