= Big Game Hunt (film) =

- Spanish: Caza mayor
- Directed by: Daniel Sánchez Arévalo
- Screenplay by: María Ballesteros; José Antonio de Pascual
- Based on: El Tigre by María Ballesteros and José Antonio de Pascual
- Produced by: Carmela Martínez Oliart; Daniel Sánchez Arévalo; Rafa Taboada; Arturo Valls
- Starring: Antonio de la Torre; Mariló Márquez Villa; Julián Villagrán
- Cinematography: Rafa García
- Production companies: Movistar Plus+; La película del tigre AIE; Estela Films; Tenampa Films; Cut One; Pólvora Films; Tinnitus
- Distributed by: Warner Bros. Pictures
- Release date: 16 April 2027
- Country: Spain
- Language: Spanish

Big Game Hunt (Spanish: Caza mayor) is an upcoming rural thriller film directed by Daniel Sánchez Arévalo from a screenplay by María Ballesteros and José Antonio de Pascual based on their podcast El Tigre. It stars Antonio de la Torre, Mariló Márquez Villa, and Julián Villagrán.

== Plot ==
Set in Fregenal de la Sierra, the plot follows local swineherd José Luis arriving home covered in blood claiming to have seen a tiger, eliciting doubts about whether the claim is not true but an alibi to cover up the theft of Iberian pigs.

== Cast ==
- Antonio de la Torre
- Mariló Márquez Villa
- Julián Villagrán

== Production ==
Sánchez Arévalo claimed that the film intends to be "a rural thriller, a drama, a black comedy, [and] a Western". Meanwhile, producers Félix Tusell, Carmela Martínez Oliart, Rafa Taboada, and Arturo Valls stated that the script strikes a balance between "pure genre and naturalistic customs". The film is a Movistar Plus+, La película del tigre AIE, Estela Films, Tenampa Films, Cut One (Boomerang TV), Pólvora Films, and Tinnitus production. It also had the participation of Atresmedia and the collaboration of Atresmedia Cine. Rafa García worked as cinematographer, using an Arri Alexa 35 camera and Cooke Anamorphic SF lenses.

Principal photography began on 23 January 2026 and wrapped on 15 March 2026. Shooting locations included Fregenal de la Sierra as well as Bodonal de la Sierra and Zafra.

== Release ==
Warner Bros. Pictures secured Spanish theatrical distribution, scheduled for 16 April 2027. Film Factory acquired international sales rights.

== See also ==
- List of Spanish films of 2026
