= A Moroccan Affair =

- Promotional release poster
- Spanish: Ocho apellidos marroquís
- Directed by: Álvaro Fernández Armero
- Screenplay by: Daniel Castro
- Produced by: Ghislain Barrois; Álvaro Augustin; Jaime Ortiz de Artiñano; Gonzalo Salazar-Simpson
- Starring: Julián López; Michelle Jenner; Elena Irureta; María Ramos
- Cinematography: Sergi Gallardo
- Edited by: Raúl de Torres
- Music by: Vanessa Garde
- Production companies: Telecinco Cinema; Lazona; Pris&Batty; Toto Films AIE
- Distributed by: Universal Pictures International Spain
- Release date: 1 December 2023
- Country: Spain
- Language: Spanish
- Budget: €5.5 million
- Box office: €12.5 million

A Moroccan Affair (Spanish: Ocho apellidos marroquís) is a 2023 Spanish romantic comedy film directed by Álvaro Fernández Armero from a screenplay by Daniel Castro which stars Julián López, Michelle Jenner, Elena Irureta, and María Ramos. Originally known under the title of Casi familia ('Almost Family'), it was retitled and rebranded as a sequel to box-office hits Spanish Affair and Spanish Affair 2.

== Plot ==
Upon the death of rich Cantabrian canning businessman José María, José María's widow Carmen, daughter Begoña, and Begoña's ex Guillermo, travel to Essaouira to recover the patriarch's first fishing vessel. Amid cultural clashes, they find out about José María's secret daughter in Morocco, Hamida.

== Cast ==
- Elena Irureta as Carmen
- Michelle Jenner as Begoña
- Julián López as Guillermo López de Castro
- María Ramos as Hamida
- Hamza Zaidi
- Abdelatif Hwidar
- Ayoub El Hilali as Abdel
- Antonio Resines as José María

== Production ==
The film is a Telecinco Cinema, Lazona, Pris&Batty and Toto Films AIE production and it had the participation of Mediaset España, Movistar Plus+, and Mediterráneo Mediaset España Group, and financial backing from ICAA. It was shot in between Morocco (Essaouira), Cantabria (San Vicente de la Barquera), and Madrid. The film was lensed by Sergi Gallardo, edited by Raúl de Torres, and scored by Vanessa Garde. It boasted a budget of around €5.5 million.

== Release ==
Distributed by Universal Pictures International Spain, the film was released theatrically in Spain on 1 December 2023. It had a domestic box-office gross over €1.68 million in its opening weekend, good for the 2nd largest debut for a Spanish film in 2023, but trailing well below the figures of its predecessors. The film generated an online bashing by users taking chance to convey an "anti-Woke" and racist message, eliding the questioning of the film on its cinematographic merits.

== Reception ==
On the review aggregator website Rotten Tomatoes, 40% of 5 critics' reviews are positive, with an average rating of 5.0/10.

Alberto Corona of eldiario.es concluded that the film "is bad even by its miserable standards, but that is not the worst part: the worst part is that we have yet to suffer through many similar films".

Fran Chico of Fotogramas rated the film 3 out of 5 stars, citing Irureta's performance as a positive point, while writing that the film is "it is still [no more than] a romantic comedy for quick consumption".

Raquel Hernández Luján of HobbyConsolas rated the film with 37 points ('bad'), deeming it to be less fun than its predecessors.

Luis Martínez of El Mundo rated the film with 2 stars, writing that the film "laughs at the Spanish right. Or so it pretends", but lamenting that it attempts to be humorous "without hurting; scratching the conscience, but without drawing blood".

== See also ==
- List of Spanish films of 2023
