= Aitziber Garmendia =

Spanish Basque actress and television presenter

- Born: December 10, 1982 (age 43); Zaldibia, Gipuzkoa
- Education: University of the Basque Country; TAE Donostia
- Occupations: Actress, Television Presenter
- Known for: Role in Martin, hosting Batek Daki (Who knows!)
- Awards: Ramón Labayen Award; Distira Award

Aitziber Garmendia Mendizabal (Zaldibia, Gipuzkoa, December 10, 1982) is a film, theater, and television actress and television presenter.

She rose to fame at the age of eighteen for her role in the ETB1 series Martin. Currently, among other projects, she hosts the program Batek Daki (Who knows!) on the Basque television channel ETB1, which broadcasts in Basque.

In addition to appearing in several feature films, including Spanish Affair (Ocho apellidos vascos), she is also a regular in theater— the field where she began her acting career.

== Biography ==
She began acting in theater at her ikastola (Basque-language school). At age 13, she performed in her first play with the theater group from Beasáin (Gipuzkoa).

She earned a law degree from the University of the Basque Country in 2008. After graduating, she worked briefly as an intern at a notary's office. She also obtained a diploma in theater and performing arts from TAE Donostia (Donostia-San Sebastián Performing Arts Workshop) (2000–2003).

Her first performance was in Dario Fo's play Hitz egin dezagun sexuaz (Let's Talk About Sex), staged in Basque.

Although she describes herself simply as an actress, she has also hosted television programs such as Batek Daki (Who knows!), where her background as an actress suits the show's open and fresh approach.

She currently contributes to the ETB1 television program Gure kasa alongside brothers Antton Telleria and Julen Telleria. Furthermore, she has never stopped working in show business; she has recently performed in a play titled Erlauntza.

In 2025, Aitziber Garmendia received the Ramón Labayen Award.

She received the 2026 Distira award, at the Grand Gala of Basque Cinema, within the framework of the 74th edition of the San Sebastian Film Festival.

== Selected filmography ==
Aitziber Garmendia has appeared widely on TV (both as a character actor and as a presenter), in films, and on the stage.

=== Television ===
- Alpha Males (TV series)
- 2024–2025 – Death Inc. (TV series)

=== Film ===
- Spanish Affair (2014 film)
