= Ascen López =

Spanish actress (1957–2026)

Ascen López, stage name of Ascensión López Ferreras (30 May 1957 – 13 July 2026), was a Spanish actress of theatre, film and television. After an extensive career as a supporting actress in Spanish television fiction, she achieved great popularity in the final stage of her career thanks to her roles of Marga in Machos alfa (Alpha Males) and, especially, Nieves Torralba in Muertos S.L. (Death Inc.)

== Biography ==
=== Training and beginnings ===
Born in Arévalo in 1957 and later based in Madrid, she graduated in Dramatic Art from the Royal Higher School of Dramatic Art (RESAD) in Madrid, where she was trained under the influence of teacher William Layton. She began her professional career on stage in the mid-1980s, in productions directed by Ernesto Caballero as Rosaura, el suelo es vida, mileidi (Rosaura, the ground is life, mileidi) (1985) and El cuervo graznador grita venganza (The Grazanador Crow shouts revenge) (1986).

=== Theatre ===
Throughout her career she combined television with the theatre. In the National Dramatic Center she appeared in productions such as Presas (2008); Los dramáticos orígenes de las galaxias espirales (2016) by Denise Despeyroux; Luces de bohemia (2018), directed by Alfredo Sanzol; Tribus (2020); and El cuaderno de Pitágoras (2022), written by Carolina Africa. She also performed in Cuando deje de llover (2015), directed by Julián Fuentes Reta; Mármol (2017); and the musical Billy Elliot.

=== Television ===
She had a long career as a supporting actress in television, appearing in some of the most-watched Spanish drama series, including Al filo de la ley, Mujeres invisibles, Amar en tiempos revueltos, Sin tetas no hay paraíso, La que se avecina, Águila Roja, Cuéntame cómo pasó, Acacias 38, Velvet, and Policías, en el corazón de la calle.

In 2020, she worked on a series of projects: she appeared in Caronte alongside Roberto Álamo; played Matilde in the fourth season of Servir y proteger; joined the cast of Movistar Plus+'s Nasdrovia; and appeared in Mentiras—the Spanish adaptation of the British series Liar—playing the character Adela. Subsequently, she played Pepa across two seasons of El Inmortal (2022 and 2024) and appeared in the comedy Sentimos las molestias (2023), starring Antonio Resines and Miguel Rellán.

Mainstream recognition came in the final years of her career thanks to two comedies created by Alberto and Laura Caballero. In the Netflix production Alpha Males (2022–2026), she played Marga, Esther's mother. She later took on a lead role in Death, Inc. (2024–2026), a Movistar Plus+ comedy in which she played Nieves Torralba, a widow who takes over the management of the family funeral home following her husband's death. The actress herself described it as the role "of a lifetime," noting that it came to her just as she was preparing for retirement.

== Death ==
She died on July 13, 2026, in Madrid, aged 69. The news was communicated by the Union of Actors and Actresses, while the AISGE foundation described her as a "huge actress" and a "TV queen." It was revealed that she died of an illness, but details have not been publicly disseminated.

Her death came just weeks before the premiere of the fourth and final season of Death, Inc., scheduled for 7 August 2026, which became one of her posthumous works with the film Upiro, inspired by the first case of vampirism documented in Spain and with a premiere scheduled for 2027.

== Filmography ==
=== Television (selection) ===
Year	Title	Character	Notes
2020	Caronte		
2020	Servir y proteger	Matilde	Fourth season
2020	Nasdrovia		
2020	Lies and Deceit	Adela	
2022-2024	El Inmortal	Pepa	Two seasons
2022-2026	Alpha Males	Marga	
2023	Sentimos las molestias	Ascensión López	
2024-2026	Death Inc.	Nieves Torralba	Lead role; fourth season released posthumously

She also appeared in episodic or supporting roles in Al filo de la ley, Mujeres invisibles, Amar en tiempos revueltos, Sin tetas no hay paraíso, La que se avecina, Águila Roja, Cuéntame cómo pasó, Acacias 38, Velvet, and Policías, en el corazón de la calle.

=== Film ===
- Upiro (2026), posthumous release scheduled for 2027.
