= Adrià Collado =

Spanish actor

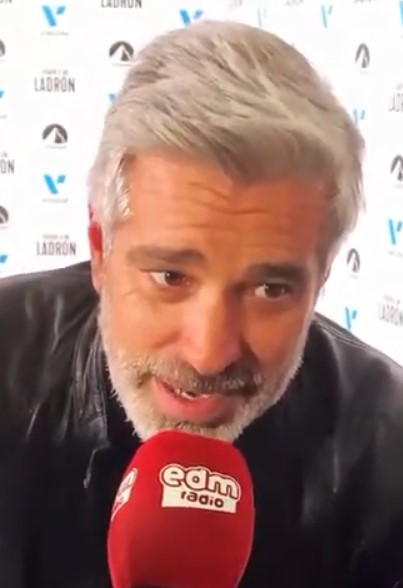
- Born: 3 August 1972 (age 53); Barcelona, Catalonia, Spain
- Occupation: Actor
- Years active: 1994-present

Adrià Collado (born 3 August 1972) is a Spanish actor. He appeared in more than fifty films since 1994.

== Selected filmography ==
=== Films ===
- 1999: Why Not Me?
- 2000: The Art of Dying as Carlos
- 2002: Bloody Mallory
- 2006: Kilometer 31
- 2006: To Let
- 2008: Proyecto Dos
- 2021: More the Merrier as Sergio
- 2021: The Unemployment Club as Benavente
- 2022: The Burning Cold

=== TV series ===
- 2003-2006: Aquí no hay quien viva as Fernando Navarro
- 2007-2024: La que se avecina as Sergio Arias
