= Black Serenade =

2001 film

- Theatrical release poster
- Spanish: Tuno negro
- Directed by: Pedro L. Barbero; Vicente J. Martín
- Written by: Pedro L. Barbero; Vicente J. Martín
- Produced by: Andrés Vicente Gómez
- Starring: Silke; Jorge Sanz; Fele Martínez; Maribel Verdú; Patxi Freytez; Enrique Villén; Rebeca Cobos; Eusebio Poncela
- Cinematography: Carlos Suárez
- Edited by: Juan Carlos Arroyo
- Production companies: Iberoamericana Films; Lolafilms; Telecinco
- Release date: 20 July 2001
- Running time: 92 minutes
- Country: Spain
- Language: Spanish

Black Serenade (Spanish: Tuno negro) is a 2001 Spanish slasher film directed and written by Pedro L. Barbero and Vicente J. Martín about a serial killer who, dressed with a tuno cape and a mask, kills underperforming university students.

== Plot ==
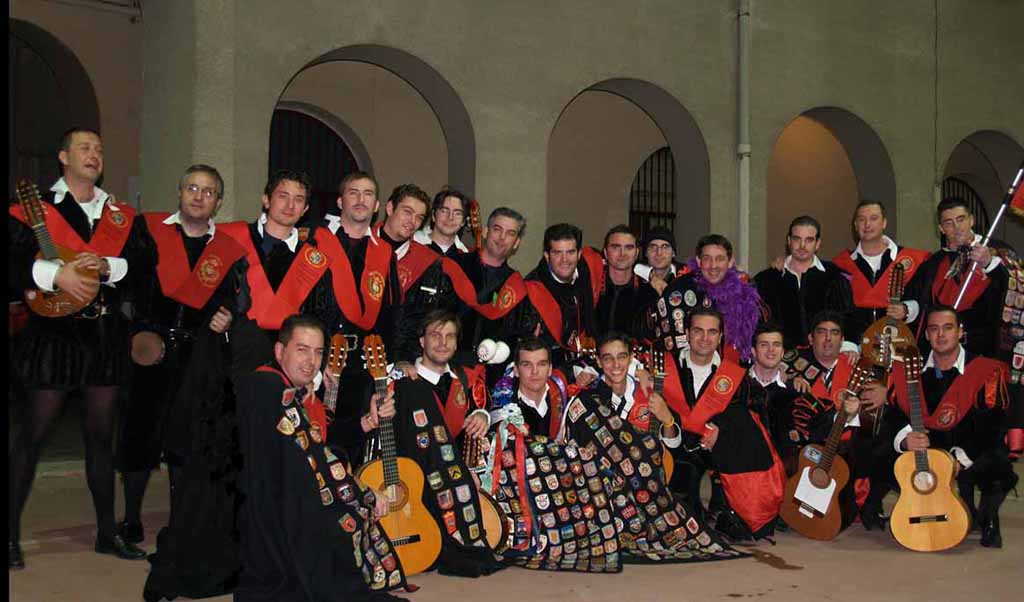
University tuna plays an important role in the movie

A serial killer infiltrates in the tuna of the University of Salamanca and uses the confusion of the night parties to kill lousy students deemed unworthy of receiving a university education. Two cops are tasked with discovering the real identity of the killer.

== Cast ==
- Silke as Alejandra Alonso
- Jorge Sanz as Eduardo
- Fele Martínez as Víctor
- Patxi Freytez as Trucha
- Enrique Villén as Teo
- Rebeca Cobos as Michelle
- Maribel Verdú as Arantxa González
- Eusebio Poncela as Don Justo
- Sergio Pazos as Alacrán

== Production ==
The film was produced by Andrés Vicente Gómez for Iberoamericana Films, Lolafilms and Telecinco, and it had the participation of Vía Digital. Filming began on 14 August 2000. Shooting locations included Salamanca, Alcalá de Henares and Madrid.

== Release ==
The film was theatrically released on 20 July 2001.

== Critical reception ==
Critical reviews of the movie were quite bad. Agusto M. Torres wrote in El País that there are "irregularities in the development of history" and that "the villain is the most difficult to figure out and lacks any kind of reason, moral or psychological, to be a serial murderer" but he also indicates that it has an "effective and fine humor". Jonathan Holland of Variety wrote that the "enjoyably tongue-in-cheek schlock-horror piece sticks too closely to the rules, with most of its chills and tingles too predictable for the teen auds it is aimed at". Carlos Aguilar in his Guía del cine español describes the movie as "incoherent and forced" but better than other contemporary Spanish slasher films such as El arte de morir or School Killer.

== See also ==
- List of Spanish films of 2001
