= Ocho apellidos catalanes =

Spanish Affair 2
- Theatrical release poster
- Spanish: Ocho apellidos catalanes
- Directed by: Emilio Martínez-Lázaro
- Written by: Diego San José; Borja Cobeaga
- Starring: Dani Rovira; Karra Elejalde; Carmen Machi; Clara Lago; Rosa Maria Sardà; Berto Romero; Belén Cuesta; Alfonso Sánchez; Alberto López
- Music by: Roque Baños
- Production companies: LaZona Films; Kowalski Films; Telecinco Cinema
- Distributed by: Universal Pictures
- Release date: 20 November 2015 (Spain)
- Running time: 99 minutes
- Country: Spain
- Language: Spanish
- Box office: €36.1 million

Spanish Affair 2 (Spanish: Ocho apellidos catalanes; transl. 'Eight Catalan Surnames') is a 2015 Spanish comedy film directed by Emilio Martínez-Lázaro. It is the sequel to the 2014 box-office hit Spanish Affair, with the four main actors reprising their characters.

== Plot ==
Some time after the events of Ocho apellidos vascos, Rafa and Koldo's daughter Amaia have parted ways. Now Amaia is dating a Catalan man named Pau. This is too much for Koldo, who ventures outside the borders of the Basque Country for the first time in his life to search for Rafa in Seville and to convince him to try and win back Amaia's heart.

== Cast ==
- Clara Lago as Amaia Zugasti
- Dani Rovira as Rafael "Rafa" Quirós / Oriol
- Carmen Machi as Merche / Carme
- Karra Elejalde as Koldo Zugasti
- Alberto López as Joaquín
- Alfonso Sánchez as Curro
- Berto Romero as Pau Serra
- Rosa Maria Sardà as Roser
- Belén Cuesta as Judit
- Agustín Jiménez as Anselmo
- Txabi Franquesa as Andreu

== Release ==
Distributed by Universal Pictures, the film premiered in Spain on 20 November 2015. The weekend of its premiere, the film gathered an audience of 1,117,678 which resulted in box office grossing of 7.9 million euros. Worldwide, the movie has accrued $40.6 million.

== Sequel ==
A film with the working title Casi familia ("Almost Family") was published in 2023 as Ocho apellidos marroquís ("Eight Moroccan surnames"). Its cast does not include actors from both earlier films.

== See also ==
- List of Spanish films of 2015
