= Spanish Affair (2014 film) =

2014 film directed by Emilio Martínez-Lázaro

- Theatrical release poster
- Spanish: Ocho apellidos vascos
- Directed by: Emilio Martínez-Lázaro
- Written by: Borja Cobeaga; Diego San José
- Starring: Dani Rovira; Clara Lago; Carmen Machi; Karra Elejalde
- Cinematography: Gonzalo F. Berridi; Juan Molina
- Production companies: LaZonaFilms; Kowalski Films; Telecinco Cinema
- Distributed by: Universal Studios
- Release date: 14 March 2014
- Running time: 98 minutes
- Country: Spain
- Language: Spanish
- Budget: US$3 million
- Box office: US$78.7 million

Spanish Affair (Spanish: Ocho apellidos vascos; lit. 'Eight Basque surnames') is a 2014 Spanish comedy film directed by Emilio Martínez-Lázaro. It premiered in Spain on 14 March 2014. Six weeks after its release, it became the second biggest box-office hit ever in Spain, behind Avatar.

== Synopsis ==
Amaia is a Basque woman visiting Seville in Andalusia for her hen party despite having learnt that her fiancé, Antxón, has abandoned her and left her with extreme debt. She becomes angry when local bartender Rafa performs a comedy routine mocking Basques and is subsequently thrown out of the bar by Rafa after having drunkenly insulted and sworn at him. Amaia ends up sleeping at his house and forgets her purse when she runs away in the morning. Against his friends' advice, Rafa decides to follow her to the Basque Country despite having never left Seville before.

On his bus journey into the Basque Country, Rafa befriends the widowed Merche (also a Southerner) who moved there after falling in love with a Basque man some years earlier. Amaia is horrified by Rafa's arrival and kicks him out of her house; he begins to leave town but is arrested after his lit cigarette causes a fire. In jail, he fabricates stories of being a member of the Basque independence movement to impress the other Basque inmates. Amaia, meanwhile, is reunited with her estranged father, Koldo who mistakenly believes she has tried to get in touch with him after 6 years absence. Amaia is unwilling to tell him about Antxón jilting her, so she bails Rafa out on the condition he pretend to be Antxón until Koldo's departure the next week.

Rafa reluctantly impersonates Antxón as a Basque, lying about having eight traditional Basque surnames (Gabilondo, Urdangarín, Zubizarreta, Arguiñano from the father and Igartiburu, Erentxun, Otegi and Clemente from the mother, even though Clemente is not authentically Basque). (Note: Referencing popular Basque individuals such as Iñaki Gabilondo, Iñaki Urdangarin, Andoni Zubizarreta, Karlos Arguiñano, Anne Igartiburu, Mikel Erentxun, Arnaldo Otegi and Javier Clemente.) Merche pretends to be Antxón's mother, Anne, and attempts to genuinely set up Rafa and Amaia despite both of their reservations. Rafa is also forced to deal with the Basque rebels who now view him as a leader. He attempts to flee multiple times but is continuously prevented by Amaia.

As the situation grows, Rafa and Amaia find themselves genuinely falling for one another. Koldo insists on remaining for the wedding, so they plan to have Amaia jilt 'Antxón' at the altar. However, Amaia is unable to go through with it and ends up saying "I do". Rafa flees back to Seville with his friends, who gatecrash the wedding believing he was kidnapped. Koldo confronts Merche but they end up sleeping together, and he is mortified the following day upon finding Spanish memorabilia around her house. Amaia admits the truth to Koldo and he recognises that her own happiness is what really matters to him. She travels to where she and Rafa met in Seville and declares her love for him, which he joyfully accepts.

== Cast ==
- Dani Rovira as Rafael "Rafa" Quirós / Antxón
- Clara Lago as Amaia
- Karra Elejalde as Koldo
- Carmen Machi as Merche / Anne
- Alberto López as Joaquín
- Alfonso Sánchez as Curro
- Lander Otaola as Borroka
- Abel Mora as Pedro
- Aitor Mazo as Father Inaxio
- Aitziber Garmendia as Iratxe
- Miriam Cabeza as Edurne
- Santi Ugalde as Kepa
- Los del Río as themselves

== Box office ==
The weekend of its premiere, the film gathered an audience of 404,020 which resulted in box office grossing of 2.72 million euros. On its second weekend its grossing increased by 56%, third best behind The Impossible and Avatar in its first ten days with a total 4.4 million euros. By April it became the most watched Spanish film in Spain with more than 6.5 million viewers and achieved the second highest box office gross in Spain, only behind Avatar, with a box-office of more than 45 million euros (more than 62 million dollars). It has grossed US$77 million in Spain and a total of US$78.7 million internationally.

== Critical reception ==
Critics were divided about the film, but were mostly positive. For magazine Cinemanía, Carlos Marañón stressed that the movie was "extremely funny". This comment was repeated in many reviews that highlighted the film is "funny", and for some, "inspired and bright". Federico Marín Bellón journalist of ABC, spoke of a "brave and timely movie", highlighting another aspect, the opportunity of its theme, which has also been emphasized by most critics who often compared it to the French film Welcome to the Sticks. Writing for daily newspaper El País, Borja Valero even predicted it could be the movie of the year.

On the negative side, Luis Martínez from El Mundo, said that the film is "a bad comedy" while Jordi Costa, from El País, said the development was irregular and ended catastrophically. Fausto Fernández, in the magazine Fotogramas, labelled it as impersonal and described its development as flat.

== Accolades ==
Year	Award	Category	Nominee(s)	Result	Ref.
2015	20th Forqué Awards	Best Fiction Feature Film		Nominated	
2015	20th Forqué Awards	Best Actor	Karra Elejalde	Nominated	
2015	2nd Feroz Awards	Best Comedy		Nominated	
2015	2nd Feroz Awards	Best Supporting Actor	Karra Elejalde	Nominated	
2015	2nd Feroz Awards	Best Supporting Actress	Carmen Machi	Nominated	
2015	2nd Feroz Awards	Best Trailer		Nominated	
2015	70th CEC Awards	Best Original Screenplay	Borja Cobeaga, Diego San José	Nominated	
2015	70th CEC Awards	Best Supporting Actor	Karra Elejalde	Won	
2015	70th CEC Awards	Best Supporting Actress	Carmen Machi	Nominated	
2015	70th CEC Awards	Best New Actor	Dani Rovira	Won	
2015	70th CEC Awards	Best Cinematography	Kalo Berridi	Nominated	
2015	29th Goya Awards	Best Supporting Actor	Karra Elejalde	Won	
2015	29th Goya Awards	Best Supporting Actress	Carmen Machi	Won	
2015	29th Goya Awards	Best New Actor	Dani Rovira	Won	
2015	29th Goya Awards	Best Cinematography	Kalo Berridi	Nominated	
2015	29th Goya Awards	Best Original Song	"No te marches jamás" by Fernando Velázquez	Nominated	
2015	24th Actors and Actresses Union Awards	Best Film Actress in a Leading Role	Clara Lago	Nominated	
2015	24th Actors and Actresses Union Awards	Best Film Actress in a Secondary Role	Carmen Machi	Won	
2015	24th Actors and Actresses Union Awards	Best Film Actor in a Secondary Role	Karra Elejalde	Won	

== Sequels ==
A sequel, Ocho apellidos catalanes (English: Eight Catalan Surnames) was released on 20 November 2015. Emilio Martínez-Lázaro repeated as director and Borja Cobeaga and Diego San José repeated as screenwriters. The original cast was joined by Berto Romero, Rosa Maria Sardà and Belén Cuesta.

A film with the working title Casi familia ('Almost Family') was released in 2023 as Ocho apellidos marroquís ('Eight Moroccan surnames'). Its cast does not include actors from both earlier films.
