= Utopia (2003 film) =

- Spanish theatrical release poster
- Spanish: Utopía
- Directed by: María Ripoll
- Screenplay by: Juan Vicente Pozuelo; Curro Royo
- Produced by: Francisco Ramos
- Starring: Leonardo Sbaraglia; Najwa Nimri; Tchéky Karyo; José García; Emma Vilarasau; Héctor Alterio; Fele Martínez
- Cinematography: David Carretero
- Edited by: Nacho Ruiz Capillas
- Music by: Patrick Goraguer
- Production companies: Alquimia Cinema; Fidélité Productions; Manga Films
- Distributed by: Hispano Foxfilm (released through 20th Century Fox) (es)
- Release date: 21 March 2003 (Spain)
- Countries: Spain; France
- Languages: Spanish; French
- Budget: €5 million

Utopia (Spanish: Utopía) is a 2003 Spanish-French fantasy thriller film directed by María Ripoll from a screenplay by Juan Vicente Pozuelo and Curro Royo which stars Leonardo Sbaraglia, Najwa Nimri, and Tchéky Karyo.

== Plot ==
Upon introduction from Jorge, a development cooperator turned guerrilla fighter (Angela), a clairvoyant (Adrián) and a blind former cop specialised in rescuing people from destructive cults (Hervé) come across each other through Utopía, a mysterious cult based in Madrid run by Samuel.

== Cast ==
- Leonardo Sbaraglia as Adrián
- Najwa Nimri as Angela
- Tchéky Karyo as Hervé
- José Garcia as the Commander
- Emma Vilarasau as Julie
- Fele Martínez as Jorge
- Héctor Alterio as Samuel

== Production ==
The film is a Spanish-French co-production by Alquimia Cinema and Fidélité Productions. Shooting began in Madrid on 17 June 2002. Shooting locations also included Salamanca. It was primarily shot in Spanish, with some French dialogue. It boasted a substantial budget of €5 million.

== Release ==
TF1 International scooped worldwide sales rights outside France and Spain. Distributed by Hispano FoxFilm, Utopia was released theatrically in Spain on 21 March 2003.

== Reception ==
Jonathan Holland of Variety wrote that "sci-fi, noir and romance are tossed into the genre blender with uneven results".

Nuria Vidal of Fotogramas rated the film 3 out of 5 stars, highlighting a "splendid" Emma Vilarasau as the film's best.

== See also ==
- List of Spanish films of 2003
