= Mylove Lost =

- Spanish: Miamor perdido
- Directed by: Emilio Martínez-Lázaro
- Screenplay by: Clara Martínez-Lázaro; Miguel Esteban
- Starring: Michelle Jenner; Dani Rovira
- Cinematography: Juan Molina
- Edited by: Ángel Hernández Zoido
- Music by: Roque Baños
- Production companies: Sony Pictures International Productions; Discontinuo La Película AIE; Impala; Caos Films; Lightbox Animation Studios
- Distributed by: Sony Pictures Entertainment Iberia
- Release dates: 4 December 2018 (Paterna); 14 December 2018 (Spain)
- Country: Spain
- Language: Spanish

Mylove Lost (Spanish: Miamor perdido) is a 2018 Spanish romantic comedy film directed by Emilio Martínez Lázaro from a screenplay by Clara Martínez-Lázaro and Miguel Esteban. It stars Michelle Jenner and Dani Rovira.

== Plot ==
Upon falling romantically for each other, Mario and Olivia adopt a cat named Miamor (Mylove), only responsive when addressed in the Valencian language. As love fades, the cat seemingly disappears too. It turns out that the cat has been secretly taken care of by Mario, prompting a vicious response by Olivia when she finds about it.

== Cast ==
- Dani Rovira as Mario
- Michelle Jenner as Olivia
- Antonio Dechent
- Vito Sanz
- Antonio Resines
- Santiago Alverú
- Will Shephard
- Daniel Pérez Prada
- Veki G. Velilla
- Pablo Carbonell
- Maite Sandoval
- María Hinojosa
- Pilar Calvo Morillas
- Almar G. Sato
- Andrea Noceda
- Virginia Riezu

== Production ==
The screenplay was penned by Clara Martínez-Lázaro alongside Miguel Esteban. The film is a Sony Pictures International Productions, Discontinuo La Película AIE, Impala, Caos Films, and Lightbox Animation Studios production, and it had the participation of RTVE. Filming began on 9 October 2017. Shooting locations included the Madrid region.

== Release ==
The film was presented at the Paterna's Kinépolis multiplex as a part of the 'Antonio Ferrandis' Film Festival slate. Distributed by Sony Pictures Entertainment Iberia, it was theatrically released in Spain on 14 December 2018.

== Reception ==
Janire Zurbano of Cinemanía rated the film 3 out of 5 stars, considering that despite having "ups and downs, as well as an arsenal of hackneyed gags", "it is inevitable" to leave the theatre with a smile.

Javier Ocaña of El País considered that the film "is always better directed than written", with Martínez-Lázaro shining even in slapstick comedy.

Manuel J. Lombardo of Diario de Sevilla rated the film 2 out of 5 stars, warning in advance to be "biologically unable to laugh at a [single] joke from the bland comedian [Rovira]" (contrasting in the film to inherent comic charms displayed by Jenner), also writing that the film ends up falling apart, and "again forgets that the key to any good romantic comedy is also to take care of the mise-en-scène and the sense of rhythm".

== See also ==
- List of Spanish films of 2018
