= Live Twice, Love Once =

2019 Spanish comedy film

- Spanish: Vivir dos veces
- Directed by: María Ripoll
- Starring: Oscar Martínez; Inma Cuesta
- Release date: 6 September 2019
- Running time: 101 minutes
- Country: Spain
- Language: Spanish

Live Twice, Love Once (Spanish: Vivir dos veces) is a 2019 Spanish road comedy-drama film directed by María Ripoll.

== Plot ==
A poignant tragic comedy about family, love, ageing, Alzheimer's and dementia. A successful Spanish mathematics professor faces the awful reality of Alzheimer's and increasingly reverts to earlier memories of a lost love. With hesitant but increasing support from his somewhat dysfunctional family, the professor pursues a childhood dream before losing all his memory, forging stronger family ties long the way.

== Release ==
The film premiered in Madrid on 6 September 2019.

== Reception ==
As of October 2021, 50% of the eight critics reviews compiled on Rotten Tomatoes are positive, with an average rating of 5.4/10.

== Awards and nominations ==
Year	Award	Category	Nominee(s)	Result	Ref.
2019	2nd Valencian Audiovisual Awards	Best Film		Won	
2019	2nd Valencian Audiovisual Awards	Best Actress	Inma Cuesta	Nominated	
2019	2nd Valencian Audiovisual Awards	Best Actor	Óscar Martínez	Won	
2019	2nd Valencian Audiovisual Awards	Best Supporting Actress	Mafalda Carbonell	Won	
2019	2nd Valencian Audiovisual Awards	Best Supporting Actor	Nacho López	Nominated	
2019	2nd Valencian Audiovisual Awards	Best Screenplay	María Minguez Pardo	Won	
2019	2nd Valencian Audiovisual Awards	Best Original Score	Arnau Bataller, Simón Smith	Won	
2019	2nd Valencian Audiovisual Awards	Best Sound	Carlos Lidón	Nominated	
2019	2nd Valencian Audiovisual Awards	Best Makeup and Hairstyles	Esther Guillem, Marta Arce	Nominated	
2019	2nd Valencian Audiovisual Awards	Best Costume Design	Cristina Rodríguez	Won	
2019	2nd Valencian Audiovisual Awards	Best Cinematography	Nuria Roldós	Nominated	
2019	2nd Valencian Audiovisual Awards	Best Production Supervision	Christian Guijarro, Lorena Lluch	Nominated	

== See also ==
- List of Spanish films of 2019
