= The Man with Rain in His Shoes =

1998 film by María Ripoll

- Directed by: Maria Ripoll
- Written by: Rafa Russo
- Starring: Lena Headey; Douglas Henshall; Penélope Cruz; Guastavo Salmerón; Eusebio Lázaro; Mark Strong; Charlotte Coleman; Neil Stuke; Elizabeth McGovern
- Release dates: October 1998 (Sitges); 25 January 1999 (United States)
- Running time: 91 minutes
- Country: Spain
- Language: English

The Man with Rain in His Shoes is a 1998 Spanish-British romantic comedy film, written by Spanish singer-songwriter Rafa Russo, directed by Spanish filmmaker María Ripoll (in her directing debut) and starring Lena Headey, Douglas Henshall, Penélope Cruz, Mark Strong and Elizabeth McGovern with Paul Popplewell. The film was released under the titles Twice Upon a Yesterday in the United States and If Only... in France, the United Kingdom, and Australia.

== Plot ==
Victor is an actor in London who is desperate to stop his ex-girlfriend, Sylvia, to whom he was unfaithful, from marrying another man. After meeting two mysterious dustmen, he is given the chance to travel back in time and relive his romance. However, he finds that things develop differently this time around—Sylvia has an affair with Dave, and she leaves him.

== Cast ==
- Douglas Henshall as Victor Bukowski
- Lena Headey as Sylvia Weld
- Penélope Cruz as Louise
- Charlotte Coleman as Alison Hayes
- Mark Strong as Dave Summers
- Neil Stuke as Freddy
- Elizabeth McGovern as Diane
- Inday Ba as Janice
- Paul Popplewell as Simon
- Antonio Gil as Director
- Gustavo Salmerón as Rafael
- Eusebio Lázaro as Don Miguel

== Soundtrack ==
The soundtrack features songs performed by Alpha Blondy, Nigel and Lewis, Salif Keita, and Susana Martins. The film's writer Rafa Russo also performs his own composition "Friends Are Friends".

== Awards ==
The film won Best Screenplay 1998 at the Montreal World Film Festival, the Gran Angular Award 1998 at the Sitges - Catalan International Film Festival and the Bronze Precolumbian Circle at the 1999 Bogota Film Festival.

== See also ==
- List of films featuring time loops
