= The Unemployment Club =

- Theatrical release poster
- Spanish: El club del paro
- Directed by: David Marqués
- Written by: David Marqués
- Produced by: Ramiro Acero
- Starring: Carlos Areces; Fernando Tejero; Adrià Collado; Eric Francés
- Cinematography: Guillem Oliver
- Edited by: Nacho Ruiz Capillas
- Music by: Juanma Redondo
- Production companies: Sunrise Pictures Company; Vertice 360; Telespan 2000
- Release dates: August 19, 2021 (Tarazona); September 17, 2021 (Spain); March 12, 2022 (Miami)
- Running time: 83 minutes
- Country: Spain
- Language: Spanish

The Unemployment Club (Spanish: El club del paro), released in Canada as The Unemployed Club, is a 2021 Spanish comedy film written and directed by David Marqués. It stars Carlos Areces, Fernando Tejero, Adriá Collado and Eric Francés, along with Antonio Resines, Javier Botet, María Isasi, Carmen Ruiz and Veki Velilla.

== Synopsis ==
Every morning, whatever the day, Fernando, "El Negro", Jesús and Benavente, four friends, meet in a bar to have a few beers and fix the world in their own way: criticizing and ranting against everything and everyone. They all have something in common, they are unemployed, well... except one.

== Cast ==
The actors participating in this film are:

- Carlos Areces as Fernando
- Fernando Tejero as Jesús
- Adrià Collado as Benavente
- Eric Francés as "El Negro"
- Antonio Resines as Mr. Luna
- Carmen Ruiz as Diana
- Javier Botet as Julián
- Susana Merino as Socorro
- Héctor Montoliu as Candidate
- Veki Velilla as Flora
- María Isasi as Mr. Luna's assistant

== Production ==
Principal photography began on February 23, 2021, in and around Madrid, Spain (Alcobendas, Algete, etc.) and ended at the beginning of April of the same year.

== Release ==
The Unemployment Club had its world premiere on August 19, 2021, at the 18th Tarazona & Moncayo Comedy Film Festival. It was commercially released on September 17, 2021, in Spanish cinemas. In addition, it was screened on March 12, 2022, at the 39th Miami International Film Festival.

== Accolades ==
Year	Award / Festival	Category	Recipient	Result	Ref.
2021	Cooper Awards	Best Comedy Feature Film	David Marqués	Won	
2021	Onyko Films Awards	Best Comedy Feature Film	David Marqués	Won	
2021	Silver Mask Film Festival	Best Comedy Film	David Marqués	Won	
2021	Art Film Awards	Best Comedy Film	David Marqués	Won	
2022	New York City IO Film Festival	Best Comedy Feature Film	David Marqués	Won	
2022	Islantilla Cinefórum Film Festival	Best Feature Film - Audience Award	David Marqués	Nominated	
2022	Islantilla Cinefórum Film Festival	Best Actor	Carlos Areces	Nominated	
2022	Islantilla Cinefórum Film Festival	Best Actor	Adrià Collado	Nominated	
