= It's Now or Never (film) =

2015 film

- Spanish: Ahora o nunca
- Directed by: María Ripoll
- Screenplay by: Jorge Lara; Francisco Roncal
- Produced by: Francisco Ramos; Mercedes Gamero; Eneko Gutiérrez
- Starring: María Valverde; Dani Rovira; Clara Lago; Jordi Sánchez; Joaquín Núñez; Gracia Olayo; Yolanda Ramos; Melody; Alicia Rubio; Marcel Borràs; Carlos Cuevas
- Cinematography: Pau Esteve Birba
- Edited by: Roberto Otero; Sergi Cameron
- Music by: Simon Smith
- Production companies: Zeta Cinema; Atresmedia Cine
- Distributed by: Sony Pictures Releasing de España
- Release dates: 16 June 2015 (Cines Callao); 19 June 2015 (Spain)
- Country: Spain
- Language: Spanish
- Budget: €2.9 million
- Box office: €8.3 million

It's Now or Never (Spanish: Ahora o nunca; lit. Now or never) is a 2015 Spanish romantic comedy film directed by María Ripoll from a screenplay by Jorge Lara and Francisco Roncal which stars Dani Rovira and María Valverde.

== Plot ==
Álex and Eva are a happy couple who, after years of relationship, have decided to marry in the English countryside village (Castle Combe) where they met each other. However, an unexpected problem occurs: a strike of air traffic controllers prevent Álex and his guests from arriving where Eva is waiting.

== Cast ==
- María Valverde as Eva
- Dani Rovira as Álex (Eva's fiancé)
- Clara Lago as Tatiana (Eva's cousin)
- Jordi Sánchez as Fermín (Eva and Belén's father)
- Joaquín Núñez as Santiago (Álex and Irene's father)
- Gracia Olayo as Caritina (Álex and Irene's mother)
- Yolanda Ramos as Tita Nines
- Melody as Irene (Álex's sister)
- Alicia Rubio as Belén (Eva's sister)
- Marcel Borràs as Gabriel
- Carlos Cuevas as Dani

== Production ==
The screenplay was written by Jorge Lara and Francisco Roncal. The film is a Zeta Cinema and Atresmedia Cine production. It was shot in Barcelona, Camprodon, and Amsterdam. It boasted a €2.9 million budget.

== Music ==
The Music was composed by Simon Smith as a happy feel good comedy score with touches of brit pop, punk and jazz. Much of the score was also played by Simon Smith, including guitars, bass, piano, drums, violin, trumpet, vocals as well as writing many of the English songs. Other key musicians were brought in to provide baritone sax, lead trumpet, guitars, and double bass. One of them Victor Hernandez is the lead vocal for many of the composed songs ( Crazy for you, Run for what you want etc.)

There are also international songs included such as "Alright" (Supergrass), "Tick, tick, boom!" (The Hives), "Walk Like an Egyptian" (The Bangles) and classic Spanish pop, like "Te estoy amando locamente" (Las Grecas) and "Volando voy" (Kiko Veneno), among others.

== Release ==
The film had its premiere at Madrid's Cines Callao on 16 June 2015. Distributed by Sony Pictures Releasing de España, it was released theatrically in Spain on 19 June. It had an in-year gross of €8.3 million at the Spanish box-office.

== See also ==
- List of Spanish films of 2015
