= Cousinhood =

- Theatrical release poster
- Spanish: Primos
- Directed by: Daniel Sánchez Arévalo
- Written by: Daniel Sánchez Arévalo
- Produced by: José Antonio Félez; Fernando Bovaira
- Starring: Quim Gutiérrez; Inma Cuesta; Raúl Arévalo; Antonio de la Torre; Adrián Lastra; Clara Lago; Nuria Gago; Alicia Rubio; Marcos Ruiz
- Cinematography: Juan Carlos Gómez
- Edited by: David Pinillos
- Music by: Julio de la Rosa
- Production companies: Atípica Films; MOD Producciones
- Distributed by: Warner Bros. Pictures
- Release dates: 13 January 2011 (Santander); 4 February 2011 (Spain)
- Running time: 97 minutes
- Country: Spain
- Language: Spanish
- Box office: $5.5 million

Cousinhood (Spanish: Primos) is a 2011 Spanish romantic comedy film written and directed by Daniel Sánchez Arévalo and starring Quim Gutiérrez, Raúl Arévalo and Adrián Lastra. This is the third film of Sanchéz Arévalo, but his very first comedy, and it premiered on 4 February 2011. The film was shot in Comillas (Cantabria) during spring 2010. The film received two nominations for the 26th Goya Awards: Best New Actor (Lastra) and Best Supporting Actor (Arévalo).

== Plot ==
When Diego is abandoned by his girlfriend a day before their wedding, he decides to go with his two cousins, Julian and José Miguel, to the village where they used to go on vacation when they were little to recuperate Diego's first love: Martina. There, the trio will face again their past and some people who took part of it, such as the irreconciliable "El Bachi" and his daughter Clara.

== Cast ==
- Quim Gutiérrez as Diego
- Raúl Arévalo as Julián
- Adrián Lastra as José Miguel
- Inma Cuesta as Martina
- Antonio de la Torre as El Bachi
- Nuria Gago as Yolanda
- Clara Lago as Clara
- Alicia Rubio as Toña
- Marcos Ruiz as Dani

== See also ==
- List of Spanish films of 2011
