= Álvaro Fernández Armero =

Spanish film director and writer

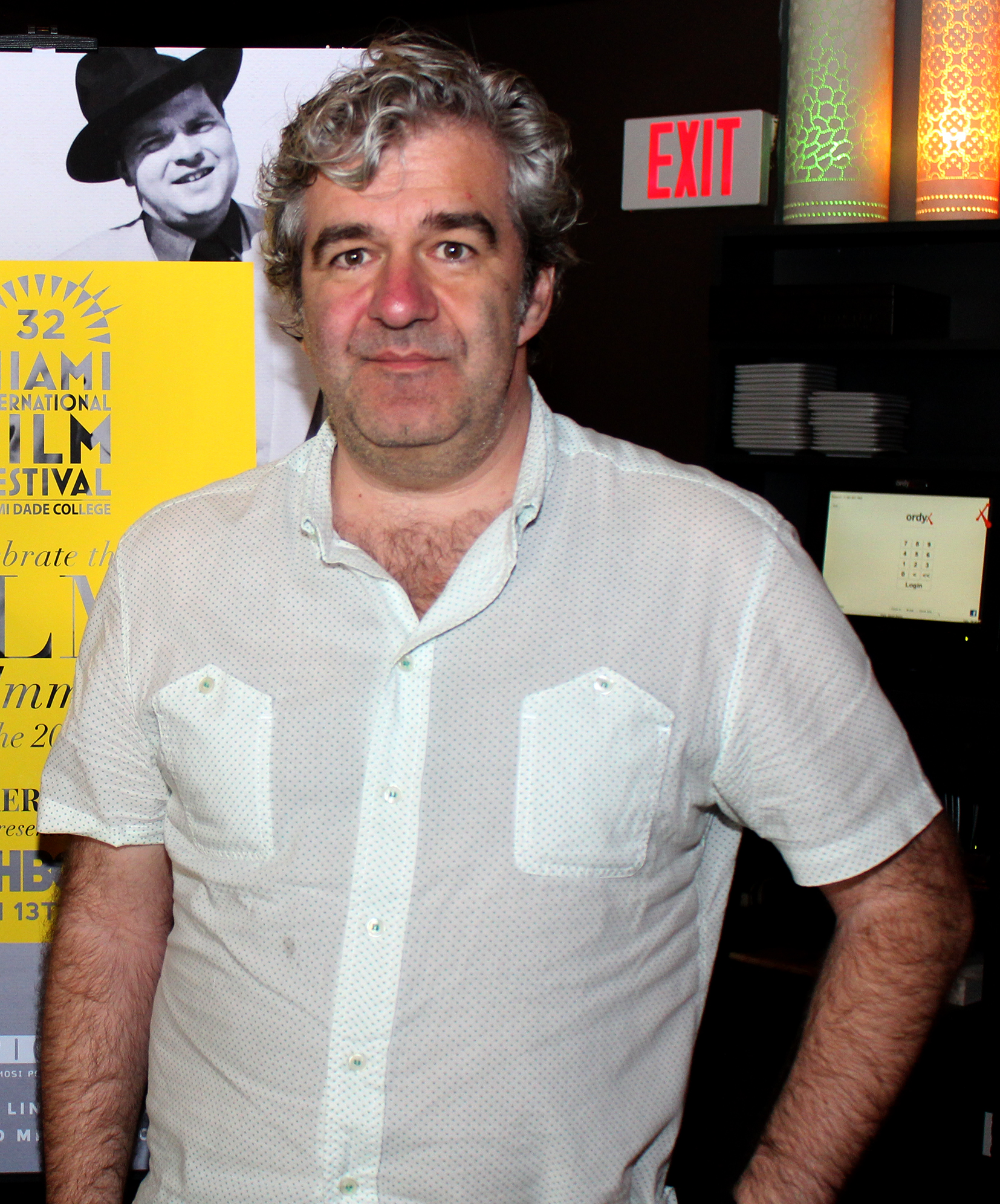
- Born: 6 March 1969 (age 56); Madrid, Spain
- Occupations: director; writer; producer; actor
- Years active: 1993-present
- Relatives: Coloma Fernández Armero (sister)

Álvaro Fernández Armero (born 6 March 1969) is a Spanish film director, writer, producer and actor; who is known for El columpio (1993), Vergüenza (2017) and The Art of Dying (2000).

== Early life ==
Álvaro Fernández Armero was born on 6 March 1969 in Madrid. He studied Philosophy and later was trained in different fields of cinematography.

== Personal life ==
He has a sibling named Coloma Fernández Armero, who is a screenwriter.

== Filmography ==
Year	Title	Credited as		Notes
Year	Title	Director	Writer	Notes
1993	El columpio	Yes	Yes	Short film
1994	Todo es mentira	Yes	Yes	as Alvaro Fernandez Armero
1995	Dile a Laura que la quiero	No	Yes	
1996	Brujas	Yes	Yes	as Alvaro Fernandez Armero
1998	Nada en la nevera	Yes	Yes	
2000	The Art of Dying	Yes	No	
2004	El juego de la verdad	Yes	Yes	
2005	Ángel Nieto: 12+1	Yes	Yes	Documentary
2007	Blinkers	Yes	Yes	
2014	Las ovejas no pierden el tren	Yes	Yes	
2021	A 10.000 km de la Navidad	Yes	No	
2023	Ocho apellidos marroquís	Yes	No	
2025	Los Muértimer	Yes	No	

== Awards and nomination ==
Year	Film	Role	Notes
1992	El columpio	Director	Goya Award for Best New Director
2005	Ángel Nieto: 12+1	Director and writer	César Agüí Award
