= Lorea Intxausti =

Spanish actress (born 2000)

Lorea Intxausti Oregi, born on March 13, 2000, is a Basque film, theatre and television actress.

Intxausti has appeared in TV series such as Go!azen and Death Inc.. In the latter, she played the character Laia, one of the series' main characters.

== Life ==
In 2012, she won the San Sebastián "Stories for Peace and Human Rights" competition, and in 2014, she was awarded a prize in the Eduardo Chillida Mathematics Olympiad of the Basque Country. She attended the Lizeoa Axular school in San Sebastián. Later, she completed her baccalaureate studies at La Salle Donostia. She finished at the top of her class with a perfect grade point average of 10 out of 10 and received an honors distinction for having the best academic record.

She pursued a double degree in Computer Engineering and Business Administration and Management at the University of Deusto, graduating in 2023. She received the Sebastian Iruretagoyena Award for the Best Final Degree Project in Business Administration and Management (2022–2023) for her project titled "Goazen Udalekuak: A Business Creation Project."

In June 2023, she graduated from the Taller de Artes Escénicas (TAE, Performing Arts Workshop) school in San Sebastián.

== Selected filmography ==
- 2019–2024 – Go!azen (TV series)
- 2024–2025 – Death Inc. (TV series)
