= Clara Lago =

Spanish actress (born 1990)

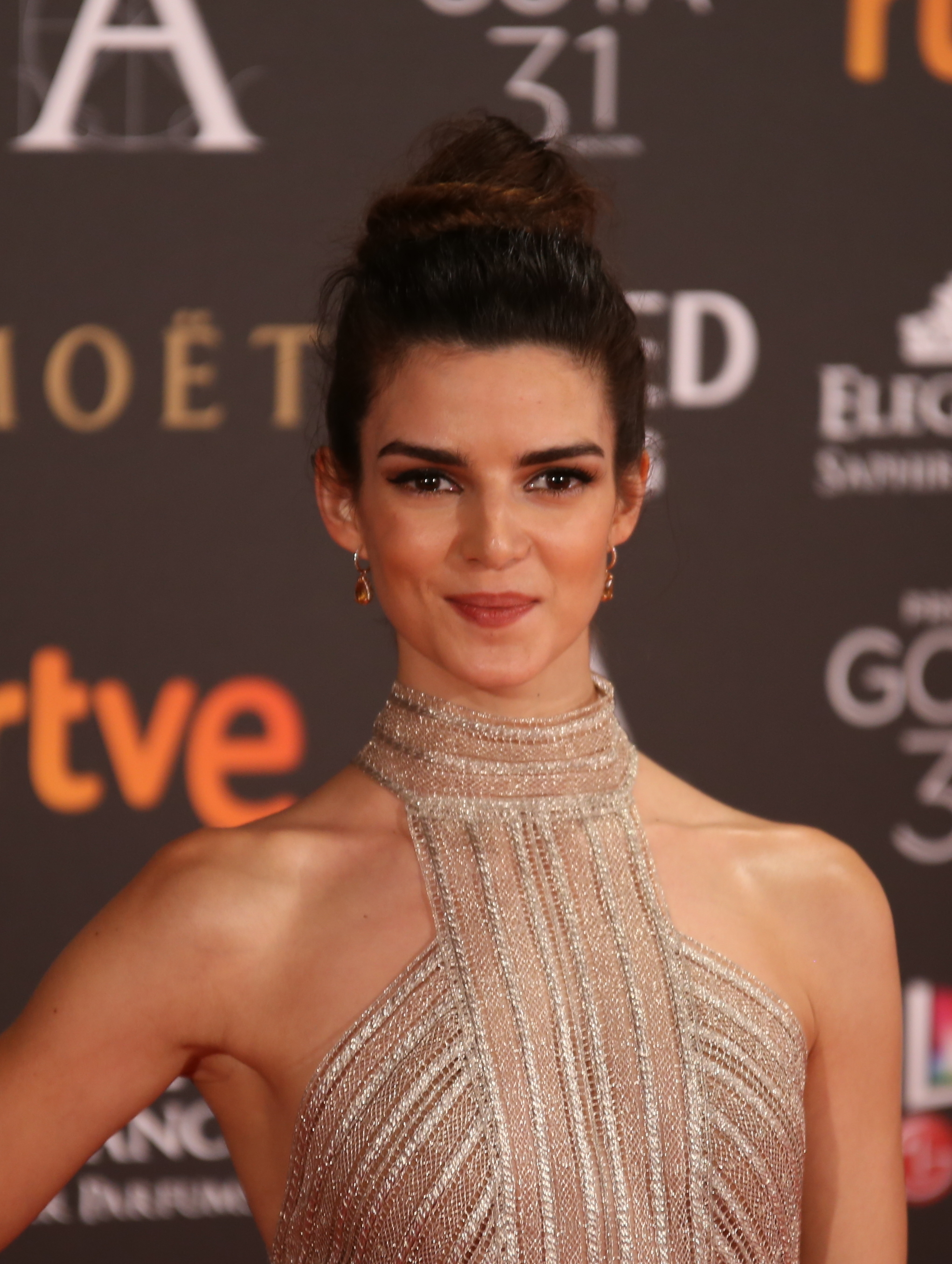
- Clara Lago in 2017
- Born: Clara Lago Grau; 6 March 1990 (age 36); Torrelodones, Community of Madrid, Spain
- Occupation: Actress
- Years active: 2000–present
- Partner: Dani Rovira (2013–2019)

Clara Lago Grau (born 6 March 1990) is a Spanish actress.

== Career ==
Clara Lago Grau was born on 6 March 1990 in Torrelodones, Community of Madrid. Lago made her feature film debut in Miserable Life (2000), providing the voice to Bea. She also joined the cast of Compañeros.

In 2002 she starred in Carol's Journey, a film directed by Imanol Uribe for which Lago was nominated for a Goya Award for Best New Actress.

She won the 'Best New Talent in Spanish Cinema' awarded by L'Oreal in the 2008 56th San Sebastian Film Festival.

Clara won the Shooting Stars Award by the ICAA for the European Film Academy and the Berlin International Film Festival in 2011 for her role in the film The Hidden Face.

In November 2012 she played Eva in Fin, along Maribel Verdú and Daniel Grao.

In 2014, Lago starred in Spanish Affair. The film broke Spanish box-office records, becoming the top-grossing Spanish title of all time with more than $75 million in sales and sitting. Then she portrayed in the stage play La venus de las pieles, directed by David Serrano de la Peña.

Lago appears in the 2015 film Extinction along with Matthew Fox and Jeffrey Donovan, in an adaptation of Juan de Dios Garduño's bestseller book Y pese a todo.

In 2017 she dubbed Cleopatra in the video game Assassin's Creed: Origins. It is the first time she participated in the dubbing of a video game.

== Personal life ==
In 2013, Lago began a relationship with her Ocho Apellidos co-star Dani Rovira. The couple officially broke up in 2019 after 5 years of dating. Lago speaks fluent English and Spanish. In March 2017 she started a vegan diet due to an ethical and environmental decision that gives her "peace of mind", adding that she feels "full of energy" and is "perfect" in health.

== Filmography ==
=== Film ===
Year	Title	Role	Notes	Ref.
2000	Terca vida (Miserable Life)	Bea	Voice. Feature film debut	
2002	El viaje de Carol (Carol's Journey)	Carol		
2004	La vida que te espera (Your Next Life)	Genia		
2006	Arena en los bolsillos	Elena		
2007	El club de los suicidas	Laura		
2008	El juego del ahorcado (The Hanged Man)	Sandra		
2010	El mal ajeno (For the Good of Others)	Ainhoa		
2011	Primos (Cousinhood)	Clara		
2011	La cara oculta (The Hidden Face)	Belén		
2012	Tengo ganas de ti (I Want You)	Gin		
2012	Fin (The End)	Eva		
2013	Parents	Isabel		
2013	¿Quién mató a Bambi? (Who Killed Bambi?)	Mati		
2014	Ocho apellidos vascos (Spanish Affair)	Amaia Zugasti		
2014	Against the Jab	Pénelope		
2015	Extinction	Woman		
2015	Ahora o nunca	Tatiana		
2015	Ocho apellidos catalanes (Spanish Affair 2)	Amaia Zugasti	Reprise of her role in Ocho apellidos vascos	
2016	Al final del túnel (At the End of the Tunnel)	Berta		
2016	Órbita 9 (Orbiter 9)	Helena		
2018	The Commuter	Eva		
2019	Gente que viene y bah (In Family I Trust)	Bea		
2019	El cuento de las comadrejas (The Weasel's Tale)	Bárbara Otamendi		
2025	Votemos (All in Favor)	Nuria		

=== Television ===
Year	Title	Role	Notes
2000–02	Compañeros	Desirée	15 episodes
2000	Manos a la obra	Estela	1 episode
2004–07	Hospital Central	Candela Rodríguez	23 episodes
2007–08	Los Hombres de Paco	Carlota Fernández	19 episodes
2008	LEX	Eli Estrada	16 episodes
2010	Las Chicas de Oro	Lucía	1 episode
2014	El corazón del océano	Ana de Rojas	6 episodes
2016	Web Therapy	Inés	
2017	The Librarians	Estrella	1 episode
2019–20	The Neighbor	Lola	10 episodes
TBD	Limbo	Sofía	
2024	Clanes (Gangs of Galicia)	Ana González Soriano	
