= Fele Martínez =

Spanish actor (born 1975)

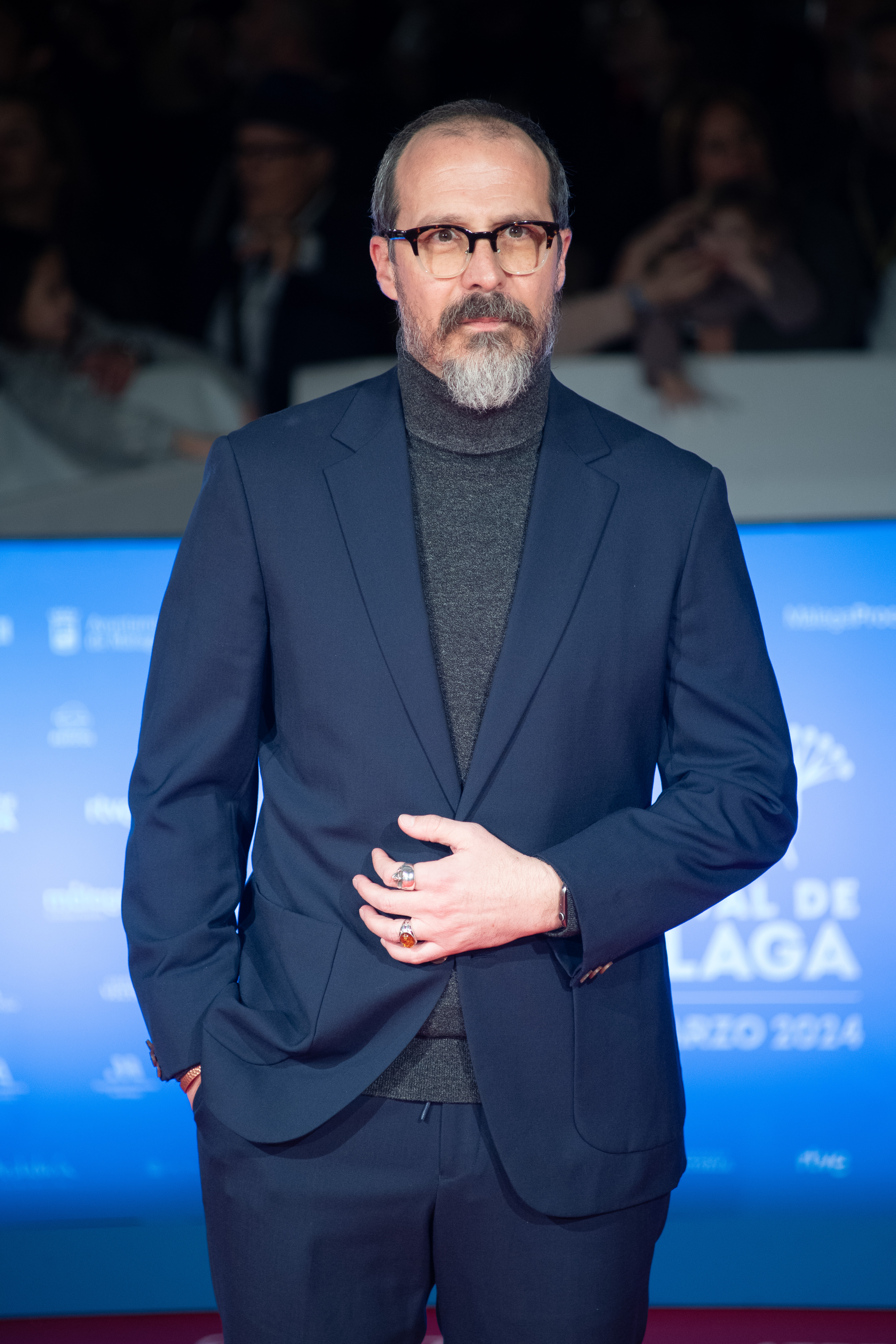
- Martínez in 2024
- Born: Rafael Martínez; 22 February 1975 (age 51); Alicante, Spain
- Education: RESAD
- Occupation: Actor
- Years active: 1996–present

Rafael "Fele" Martínez (born 22 February 1975) is a Spanish actor. He gained notoriety for his performance as Chema in Thesis (1996), his feature film debut and for which he won the Goya Award for Best New Actor.

== Early years ==
Rafael Martínez was born in Alicante on 22 February 1975. He moved to Madrid to study at the RESAD, where he set up a theater and storytelling group, the 'Sex-Peare', along with other school alumni.

== Career ==
His chance at stardom came at the hand of Alejandro Amenábar, who offered him a role in his opera prima Thesis. It was for this work that Fele received the Goya Award for Best New Actor in 1996. It was followed by performances in films such as Open Your Eyes (1997), Lovers of the Arctic Circle (1998), The Art of Dying (1999), April Captains (2000), Black Serenade (2001), and Bad Education (2004).

He has also participated in several independent film projects including the short films Pasaia (1996), for which he won Best Actor at the Elche Film Festival, Amigos (1997), La cartera (2000), and El castigo del ángel (2002) which he also directed.

== Filmography ==
Year	Title	Role	Notes	Ref.
1996	Tesis (Thesis)	Chema		
1997	El tiempo de la felicidad (Time of Happiness)	Ezequiel		
1997	Abre los ojos (Open Your Eyes)	Pelayo		
1998	Insomnio (Sleepless in Madrid)	Rafa		
1998	Los amantes del círculo polar (Lovers of the Arctic Circle)	Otto de joven		
1998	Lágrimas negras (Black Tears)	Andrés		
2000	El arte de morir (El arte de morir)	Iván		
2000	Capitães de Abril (April Captains)	Lobão		
2000	Tú qué harías por amor	Luis		
2000	Tinta roja (Red Ink)	Escalona		
2001	Tuno negro (Black Serenade)	Víctor		
2001	Noche de reyes	Trifino		
2002	Hable con ella (Talk to Her)	Alfredo		
2002	Darkness	Carlos		
2003	Dos tipos duros (Two Tough Guys)	Bebe		
2003	Utopía (Utopia)	Jorge		
2004	La mala educación (Bad Education)	Enrique Goded		
2004	Tánger	Fanfan		
2006	El síndrome de Svensson	Person in the trailer		
2007	A un metro de ti	Sebastián		
2008	14, Fabian Road	Enrique Gozalvo		
2008	Carmo (Carmo, Hit the Road)	Marco		
2008	El kaserón	Alfredo		
2013	La Estrella	Baltasar		
2015	Vampyres	Peter		
2016	La noche que mi madre mató a mi padre (The Night My Mother Killed My Father)	Carlos		
2016	Nuestros amantes (Our Lovers)	Cristóbal		
2022	En Temporada Baja	Martín		
2022	Alpha Males	Luis		
2023	Amigos hasta la muerte (Friends Till Death)	Paolo		
2023	Bajo terapia (Under Therapy)	Daniel		

== Theatre ==
- Sueños de un Seductor (2004)
- Bajo terapia (2017)

== Accolades ==
Year	Award	Category	Work	Result	Ref.
1997	11th Goya Awards	Best New Actor	Thesis	Won	
2023	25th Iris Awards	Best Actor	Alpha Males	Won	
