= Daniel Sánchez Arévalo =

Spanish screenwriter and film director (born 1970)

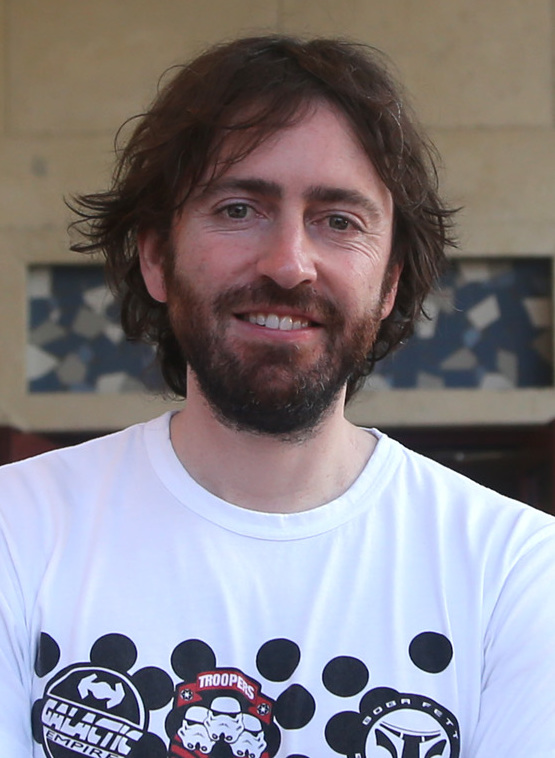
- Sánchez Arévalo in 2014
- Born: 24 June 1970 (age 56); Madrid, Spain
- Occupations: Screenwriter, film director
- Years active: 1995–present

Daniel Sánchez Arévalo (born 24 June 1970) is a Spanish screenwriter and film director. He has worked on more than twenty films since 1995.

== Life and career ==
Daniel Sánchez Arévalo is the son of the illustrator José Ramón Sánchez (recognised as the author of the election posters for the PSOE during the Transition) and the actress Carmen Arévalo and was born on 24 June 1970 in Madrid. He has a brother and a sister, respectively involved in the television industry and a dancer. He studied at the Colegio Montserrat. After taking a degree in business sciences, he began a career in television writing screenplays for Farmacia de guardia as he was hired by Antonio Mercero to that end thanks to his brother. He also wrote for Querido maestro and Hospital Central. From 2000 to 2001 he studied filmmaking at the Columbia University thanks to a Fulbright scholarship.

Endorsed by Julio Medem, his short film La culpa del alpinista (2004) was presented at the 61st Venice International Film Festival.

His feature film debut Dark Blue Almost Black (2006) won him the Goya Award for Best New Director.

In 2025, when asked by eldiario.es about the top 10 films of the 21st century, Sánchez Arévalo chose Talk to Her (2002), Grizzly Man (2005), Little Miss Sunshine (2006), Best in Show (2000), Her (2013), Eternal Sunshine of the Spotless Mind (2004), Punch-Drunk Love (2002), The Lives of Others (2006), A Prophet (2009), and A Separation (2011).

== Works ==
=== Filmography ===
Film

Year	Title	Director	Writer	Ref.
2006	Dark Blue Almost Black	Yes	Yes	
2009	Fat People	Yes	Yes	
2010	For the Good of Others	No	Yes	
2011	Cousinhood	Yes	Yes	
2013	Family United	Yes	Yes	
2019	Seventeen	Yes	Yes	
2025	Band Together	Yes	Yes	
2026	Collision Course	Yes	Yes	
2027	Big Game	Yes	No	

Short Film

Year	Title	Director	Writer	Producer	Notes
1999	The More you Know	Yes	Yes	Yes	Also editor
2000	Tras el caimán	Yes	Yes	No	
2000	Walk Away (Irse)	Yes	Yes	No	
2000	Last Thursday Night	Yes	Yes	Yes	
2000	Azotea	Yes	Yes	Yes	
2002	¡Gol!	Yes	Yes	Yes	
2003	Profilaxis	Yes	Yes	No	Also casting director
2003	Domingos	No	Yes	Yes	Also camera operator
2003	Exprés	Yes	Yes	Yes	Also art director
2003	Gris	No	Yes	No	
2004	Hotel y Domicilio	No	Yes	No	
2004	Física II	Yes	Yes	No	
2004	La Culpa del Alpinista	Yes	Yes	No	
2007	El Amor Existe Porqué El Tiempo Se Agota	Yes	Yes	No	
2007	Traumalogía	Yes	Yes	No	
2007	Pene	Yes	Yes	No	
2010	(Uno de los) Primos	Yes	Yes	No	Promotional short film of his film Cousinhood
2016	Queimafobia	Yes	Yes	No	Also editor and based on an extract of his novel La isla de Alice
2025	Pipiolos	Yes	Yes	Yes	

Producer only

- Dos más (2001)
- Digital (2005)
- El premio (2010)

Associate producer

- Archipielago (2003)
- Mapa (2010)

Commercials

Year	Title	Director	Writer	Company	Notes
2016	Cabra y Oveja	No	Yes	Naturgy	Series "En un tu cabeza"
2016	Milagros y Remedios	No	Yes	Naturgy	Series "En un tu cabeza"
2016	Suegro y Suegra	No	Yes	Naturgy	Series "En un tu cabeza"
2016	Tu y Dos Veces Yo	Yes	Yes	Naturgy	Series "En un tu cabeza"
2016	No Vaya a Ser Que	Yes	Yes	Shackleton	
2017	Un Beso de Película	Yes	Yes	Oikos	
2017	Leones	Yes	Yes	Fundación Ronald McDonald España	
2018	Birgi: El Poder de la Red	Yes	Yes	Vodafone	
2018	La Tienda LOL	Yes	Yes	Campofrío	
2019	Fake Me	Yes	Yes	Campofrío	
2020	D.E.V.:Disfrute en Vida	Yes	Yes	Campofrío	Co-directed with Paco Plaza
2022	La Mejor Versión De Ti	Yes	Yes	Viajes Soltour	
2022	La Herencia	Yes	Yes	Campofrío	

Television

Year	Title	Director	Writer	Notes
1995	Farmacia de Guardia	No	Yes	2 episodes
1997	Los Negocios de Mama	No	Yes	2 episodes
1998	Una de Dos	No	Yes	1 episode
1998	Hermanas	No	Yes	6 episodes
1999	Ellas Son Así	No	Yes	6 episodes
2001	Abogados	No	Yes	
2005	Lobos	No	Yes	1 episode
2022	The Girls at the Back	Yes	Yes	TV miniseries Also executive producer

Cameo roles

Year	Title	Role	Notes
1998	Hermanos	Cliente (uncredited)	TV series Episode "Veinticienco de diciembre, oink, oink, oink"
2013	Casting	Self	Feature-length film
2017	Akemarropa	Self	Feature-length film
2017	The Laws of Thermodynamics	Self	Feature-length film
2018	Birgi: El Poder de la Red	Self	Short film
2022	Voy a pasármelo bien	Self	Feature-length film

Other credits

Year	Title	Role	Notes
2005	Ponys	Editor	Short film
2013	Zip & Zap and the Marble Gang	Screenplay advisor	Feature length-film
2019	Como novio de pueblo	Based on his film Cousinhood	Feature length-film

=== Bibliography ===
- La maleta de Ignacio Karaoke (1998)
- 31 de Junio de 1993 (2007)
- La isla de Alice (2015)

=== Theatre ===
Year	Title	Role	Notes
2009	Los 40 el Musical	Writer	[Jukebox musical]

=== Podcast ===
Year	Title	Director	Writer	Actor	Role	Notes
2022	Nosotros 2036	Yes	Yes	Yes	Jorge	Podcast series 5 episodes
