= Sant Pere de Casserres =

Benedictine monastery in Catalonia, Spain

Coordinates: 42.001712°N 2.340667°E

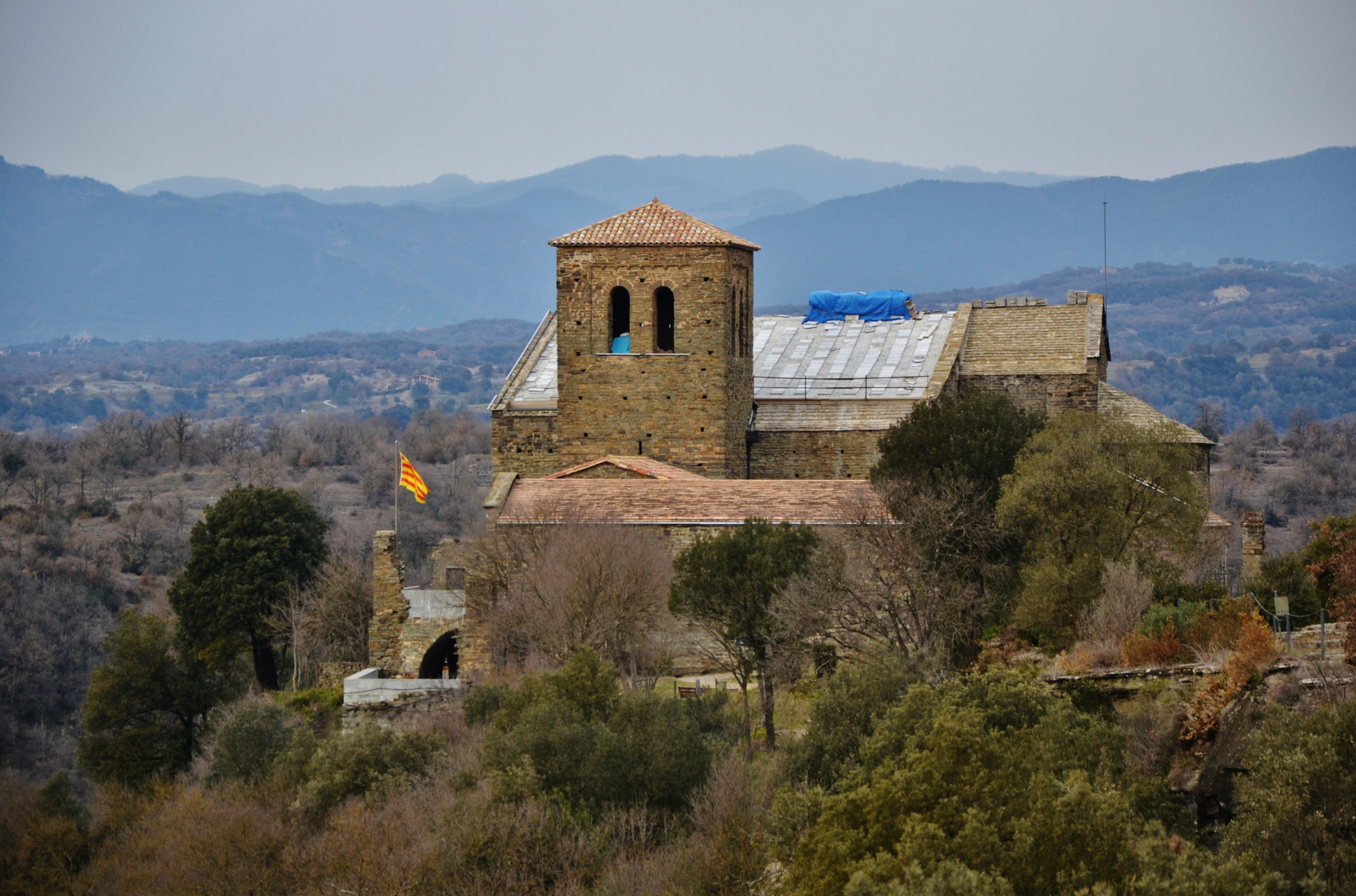
Sant Pere de Casserres

Sant Pere de Casserres is a Benedictine monastery in the town of Les Masies de Roda, Osona comarca, Catalonia, Spain. The 11th-century Romanesque-style building was declared a Bien de Interés Cultural landmark in 1931.

== Architecture and fittings ==
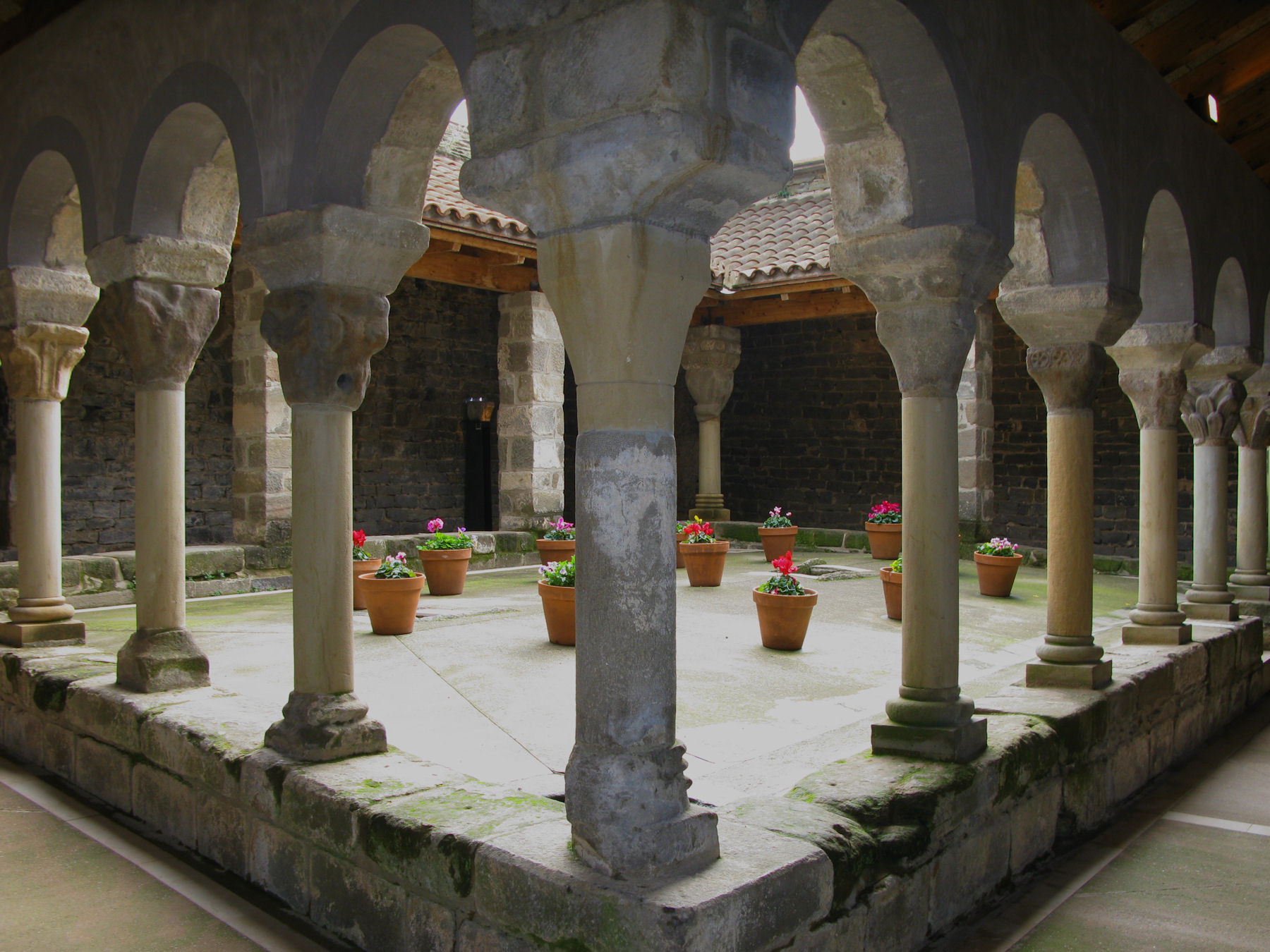
Cloister

The building is quadrangular, somewhat wider than long, with three separate double-cruciform pillars supporting the nave's arches. The three naves are covered by barrel vaults. They were decorated with murals, some fragments of which are still visible. Outside, the apses are decorated in Lombard style with a frieze of blind arcades and pilasters. The central apse arcades have windows and a frieze. The bell tower is square and contains two floors. A second level has two arched windows on each side. The roof is hipped.

The cloister was built in the second half of the 11th century, with the same style as the cloister of the monastery of Santa Maria de l'Estany. The porches contain columns, including a row of columns at the corners. The capitals are adorned with vegetable and geometric ornamentation.

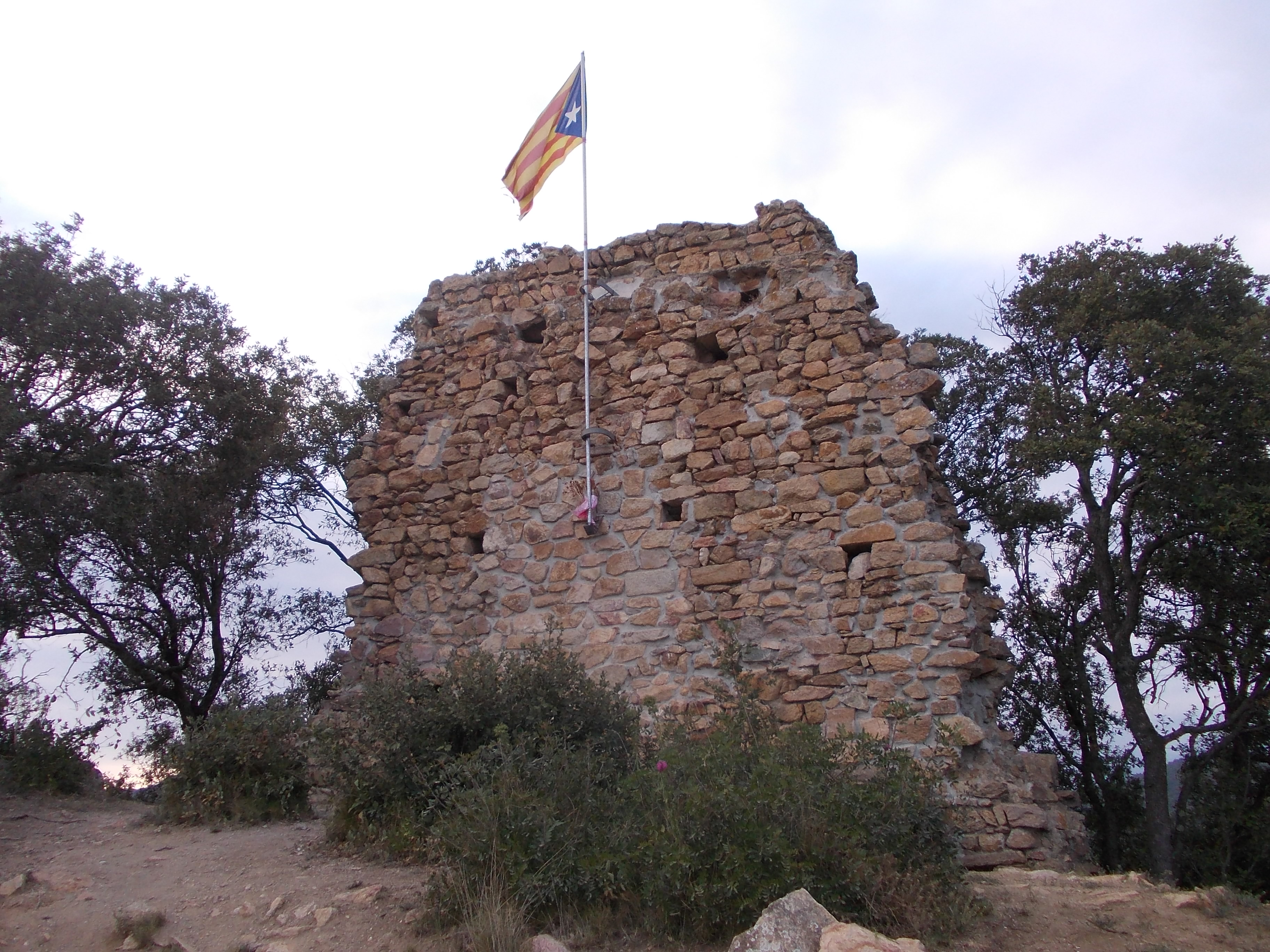
Ruins of Dosrius Castle

The Priory owned Castillo de Dosrius, which is now in ruins.

== Bibliography ==
- Pladevall, Antoni (1999). Guías Cataluña Románica, Osona. Barcelona, Pórtico. ISBN 84 7306 528 X (in Catalan)
