= Dani Rovira =

Spanish comedian and actor

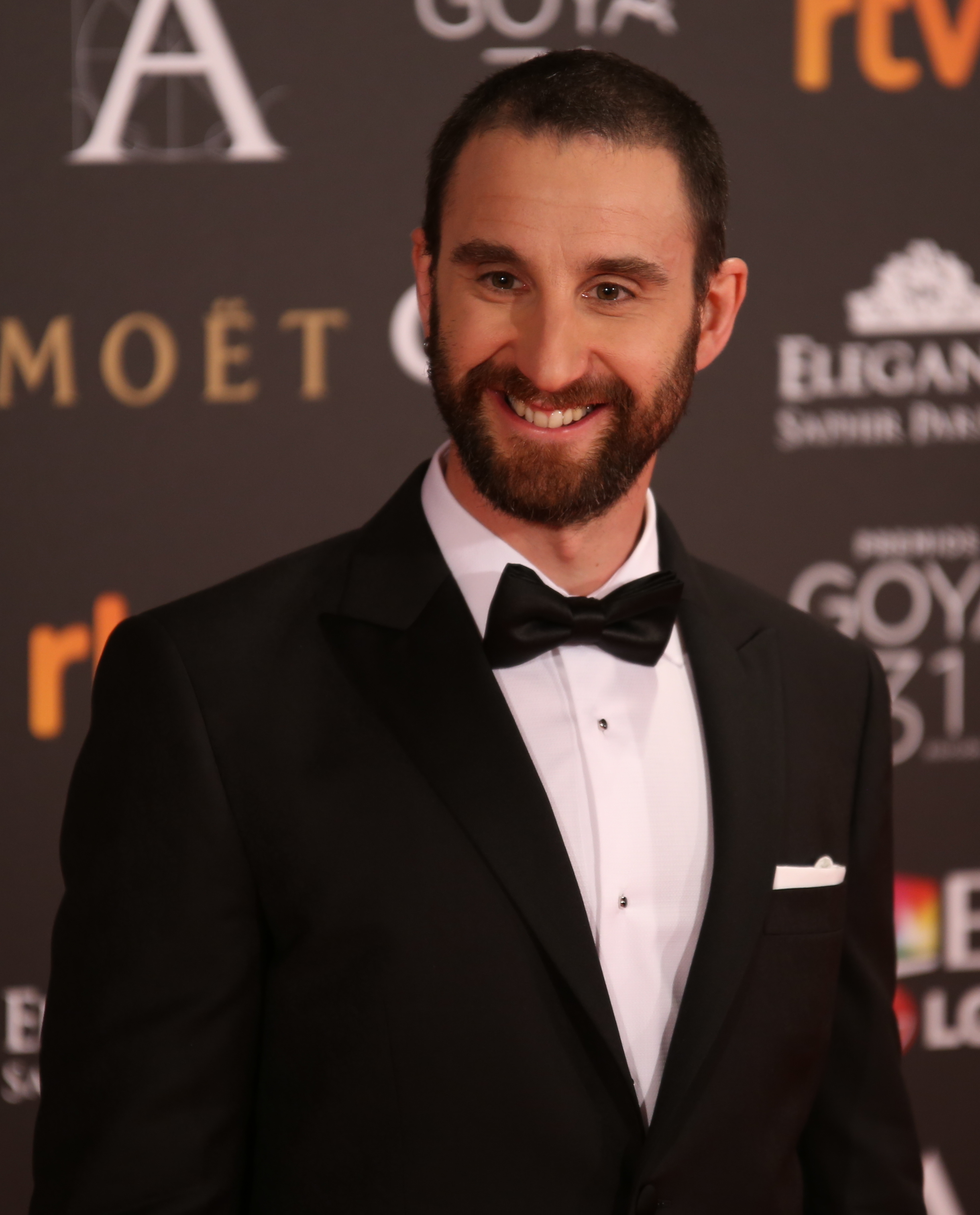
- Rovira in 2017
- Born: Daniel Rovira de Rivas; 1 November 1980 (age 45); Málaga, Spain
- Education: Universidad de Granada
- Occupations: Comedian and actor
- Years active: 2004–present
- Partner: Clara Lago (2014–2019)

Daniel Rovira de Rivas (born 1 November 1980) is a Spanish comedian and actor.

== Career ==
=== Early career ===
After graduating in Physical Education and Sport Sciences at the University of Granada, he started touring with Paramount Comedy, performing stand-up comedy all around Spain. He became known for his most famous monologue "Mi familia y yo" ("My family and I"). He then made his first appearance on TV performing in various scenes of a well-known show called Estas no son las noticias (This Isn’t the News) until May 2009. At the same time he worked and played his part in a play called ¿Quieres salir conmigo? (Do You Wanna Go Out with Me?). In February the same year he also appeared in the famous late night show Buenafuente.

In the following years, he established a career in comedy with several appearances on El Club de la Comedia and as a cast member of comedy shows No le digas a mamá que trabajo en la tele and Alguien tenía que decirlo.

=== 2013–present: Ocho apellidos vascos and other roles ===
In 2013 he filmed his first movie Spanish Affair, starring as the main character alongside Clara Lago, Karra Elejalde and Carmen Machi, directed by Emilio Martínez-Lázaro. The weekend of its premiere in March 2014, the film gathered an audience of 404,020 which resulted in box office gross of 2.72 million euros. The film broke Spanish box-office records, becoming the top-grossing Spanish title of all time with more than $75 million.

Since 2014 Rovira has played the role of Juan Gutiérrez in the comedy TV series B&b, de boca en boca, on Telecinco, until his last appearance in 2015.

On 7 February 2015 he hosted the 29th Goya Awards ceremony. At the same ceremony, he won the Goya Award for Best New Actor for Spanish Affair. On 6 February 2016 he was again host of the 30th Goya Awards ceremony.

In 2015 Rovira starred in the romantic comedy film Ahora o nunca with María Valverde, as well as in Spanish Affair 2, the sequel of the film that rose him to stardom.

He appeared along the comedian Tomás García in the first episode of 99 lugares donde pasar miedo, aired on 27 April 2019 on Discovery MAX.

== Personal life ==
In 2013, Rovira began a relationship with his Ocho Apellidos co-star Clara Lago. The couple officially broke up in 2019 after 5 years of dating. On 25 March 2020 he announced he suffers from Hodgkin lymphoma. He and Clara Lago have remained close friends since their breakup. In September 2020, via Instagram, he announced he was cured, writing: "Today's the first day of the rest of my life, I'M CURED!". Dani is vegan and an advocate against eating animals.

== Filmography ==
=== Film ===
| Year | Title | Role | Notes |
|---|---|---|---|
| 2013 | Cloudy with a Chance of Meatballs 2 | Brent McHale | voice (Spain) |
| 2014 | Ocho apellidos vascos | Rafael "Rafa" Quirós | |
| 2015 | Ahora o nunca | Alejandro Fernández | |
| 2015 | Ocho apellidos catalanes | Rafael "Rafa" Quirós | |
| 2015 | Capture the Flag | Richard Carson | voice |
| 2016 | El futuro no es lo que era | Carlos | |
| 2016 | 100 Meters | Ramón | |
| 2016 | Ozzy | Fronky | voice |
| 2017 | Thi Mai, rumbo a Vietnam | Andrés | |
| 2018 | Miamor perdido (Mylove Lost) | Mario | |
| 2018 | Superlópez | Juan López / Superlópez | |
| 2019 | Los Japón | Paco Japón | |
| 2019 | Taxi a Gibraltar | León | |
| 2021 | Jungle Cruise | Sancho | |
| 2021 | Mediterráneo | Gerard | |

=== Television ===
| Year | Title | Role | Notes |
|---|---|---|---|
| 2008–10 | Nuevos cómicos | Himself | TV program |
| 2008 | Estas no son las noticias | Himself | TV program |
| 2009 | Buenafuente | Himself | TV program |
| 2010–15 | El club de la comedia | Himself | TV program |
| 2011 | Con Hache de Eva | Himself | TV program |
| 2011 | No le digas a mamá que trabajo en la tele | Himself | TV program |
| 2012 | Alguien tenía que decirlo | Himself | TV program |
| 2013 | Óxido nitroso | Himself | TV program |
| 2014–15 | B&b, de boca en boca | Juan Gutiérrez García | TV series |
| 2014 | Todo va bien | Himself | TV program |
| 2014 | Taraská TV | Himself | TV program |
| 2015 | 29th Goya Awards | Host | TV special |
| 2015 | MovieBerto | Himself | TV program |
| 2015 | Sopa de gansos | Himself | TV program |
| 2015–present | El Hormiguero | Himself | TV program |
| 2016 | 30th Goya Awards | Host | TV special |
| 2016–2017 | LocoMundo | Himself | TV program |
| 2017 | 31st Goya Awards | Host | TV special |
| 2018–present | La Resistencia | Himself | TV program |

== Awards and nominations ==
| Year | Awards | Category | Work | Result | Ref. |
|---|---|---|---|---|---|
| 2015 | Goya Awards | Best New Actor | Ocho apellidos vascos | Won | |
| 2015 | Cinematographer Circle Medals | Best New Actor | Ocho apellidos vascos | Won | |
| 2015 | Neox Fan Awards | Best Actor | Ahora o nunca | Nominated | |
| 2017 | ONCE Solidarity Awards | ONCE Solidarity | 100 Meters | Won | |
| 2025 | 4th Carmen Awards | Best Actor | The Bus of Life | Pending | |
