= 76th CEC Awards =

Spanish film awards

- Date: 22 February 2021
- Hosted by: Carmen Santamaría; Jesús González
- Organized by: Círculo de Escritores Cinematográficos

Highlights
- Most awards: Rosa's Wedding (6)
- Most nominations: Rosa's Wedding (9)

Television coverage
- Network: YouTube

The 76th CEC Medals, presented by the Círculo de Escritores Cinematográficos, were announced on 22 February 2021. Hosted by Carmen Santamaría and Jesús González from Madrid, the ceremony was held online due to the spillover of the COVID-19 pandemic in Spain, airing on YouTube.

== Winners and nominees ==
The winners and nominees are listed as follows:

Best Film: Rosa's Wedding; Schoolgirls; Adú; One for All	Best Animation Film: Turu, the Wacky Hen
Best Director: Icíar Bollaín – Rosa's Wedding; Gracia Querejeta – The Invisible; Salvador Calvo – Adú; David Ilundain – One for All	Best New Director: Pilar Palomero – Schoolgirls; David Pérez Sañudo – Ane Is Missing; Bernabé Rico – One Careful Owner; David Galán Galindo – Unknown Origins; Pedro Collantes – The Art of Return
Best Original Screenplay: Pilar Palomero – Schoolgirls; Alicia Luna, Icíar Bollaín – Rosa's Wedding; Coral Cruz, Valentina Viso – One for All; Antonio Mercero, Gracia Querejeta – The Invisible; Alejandro Hernández – Adú	Best Adapted Screenplay: Cesc Gay – The People Upstairs; Ignasi Vidal, Polo Menárguez – The Plan; Bernabé Rico, Juan Carlos Rubio – One Careful Owner; David Galán Galindo, Fernando Navarro – Unknown Origins; Marta González de Vega, Santiago Segura – Father There Is Only One 2
Best Actor: David Verdaguer – One for All; Javier Cámara – The People Upstairs; Javier Gutiérrez – The Occupant; Raúl Arévalo – The Europeans	Best Actress: Candela Peña – Rosa's Wedding; Kiti Mánver – One Careful Owner; Emma Suárez – The Invisible; Adriana Ozores – The Invisible; Patricia López Arnaiz – Ane Is Missing
Best Supporting Actor: Ramón Barea – Rosa's Wedding; Sergi López – Rosa's Wedding; Pedro Casablanc – The Invisible; Àlex Brendemühl – Coven	Best Supporting Actress: Nathalie Poza – Rosa's Wedding; Verónica Echegui – My Heart Goes Boom!; Natalia de Molina – Schoolgirls; Patricia López Arnaiz – One for All; Ana Labordeta – One for All
Best New Actor: Chema del Barco – The Plan; Miguel Ángel Tirado – One for All; Pablo Molinero – The Summer We Lived; Moustapha Oumarou – Adú; Adam Nourou – Adú	Best New Actress: Andrea Fandos – Schoolgirls; Paula Usero – Rosa's Wedding; Amaia Aberasturi – Coven; Jone Laspiur – Ane Is Missing; Gala Amyach – The Sea Beyond
Best Cinematography: Jean-Claude Larrieu – It Snows in Benidorm; Sergi Vilanova – Adú; Daniela Cajías – Schoolgirls; Javier Agirre – Coven	Best Editing: Nacho Ruiz Capillas – Rosa's Wedding; Fernando Franco, Miguel Doblado – Black Beach; Jaime Colís – Adú; Teresa Font – Coven
Best Music: Roque Baños – Adú; Roque Baños – My Heart Goes Boom!; Adrián Foulkes, Federico Jusid – Cross the Line; Zeltia Montes – One for All	Best Documentary Film: The Year of the Discovery; Anatomía de un dandy; Dear Werner (Walking on Cinema); Bajo el silencio
Best Foreign Film: A Hidden Life; Mank; The Father; 1917; The Trial of the Chicago 7

== Special awards ==
- Honorary Medal: Julieta Serrano
- Medal for the Promotion of Cinema: Santiago Segura
- Medal for the Journalistic Merit: Gerardo Sánchez
- 'Solidaridad' Medal (Fiction): Amalia en el otoño
- 'Solidaridad' Medal (non-Fiction): Cartas mojadas
