= List of Spanish films of 2020 =

A list of Spanish-produced and co-produced feature films released in Spain in 2020. When applicable, the domestic theatrical release date is favoured.

== Films ==
Release		Title (Domestic title)	Cast & Crew	Distribution label	Ref.
J A N U A R Y	1	The Silence of the Marsh (El silencio del pantano)	Director: Marc Vigil Cast: Pedro Alonso, Nacho Fresneda, Carmina Barrios	Netflix	
J A N U A R Y	1	Turu, the Wacky Hen (La gallina Turuleca)	Director: Víctor Monigote, Eduardo Gondell	Filmax	
J A N U A R Y	10	The Innocence (La innocència)	Director: Lucía Alemany Cast: Carmen Arrufat, Laia Marull, Sergi López, Joel Bosqued, Sonia Almarcha, Josh Climent, Bogdan Florin Guilescu	Filmax	
J A N U A R Y	10	La suite nupcial	Director: Carlos Iglesias Cast: Carlos Iglesias, Ana Arias, Eloisa Vargas, José Mota, Ana Fernández, Santiago Segura, Roberto Álamo, María José Alfonso	Versus Entertainment	
J A N U A R Y	17	32 Malasana Street (Malasaña 32)	Director: Albert Pintó Cast: Begoña Vargas, Iván Marcos, Bea Segura, Sergio Castellanos, José Luis de Madariaga	Warner Bros. Pictures	
J A N U A R Y	24	I Love You, Stupid (Te quiero, imbécil)	Director: Laura Mañá Cast: Quim Gutiérrez, Natalia Tena, Alfonso Bassave, Alba Ribas, Ernesto Alterio	Filmax	
J A N U A R Y	31	Adú	Director: Salvador Calvo Cast: Luis Tosar, Anna Castillo, Álvaro Cervantes, Moustapha Oumarou, Jesús Carroza, Miquel Fernández, Adam Nourou, Zayidiyya Dissou	Paramount Pictures	
J A N U A R Y	31	Para toda la muerte	Director: Alfonso Sánchez Cast: Alberto López López, Estefanía de los Santos, Alfonso Sánchez	Alfa Pictures	
F E B R U A R Y	7	Arima	Director: Jaione Camborda Cast: Melania Cruz, Nagore Arias, Rosa Puga Dávila, Tito Asorey, Iria Parada, Mabel Rivera	Esnatu Zinema	
F E B R U A R Y	14	The Wedding Unplanner (Hasta que la boda nos separe)	Director: Dani de la Orden Belén Cuesta, Álex García, Silvia Alonso, Adrián Lastra, Antonio Dechent, Gracia Olayo, Mariano Hernández, Salva Reina, Leo Harlem	A Contracorriente Films	
F E B R U A R Y	21	The Plan (El plan)	Director: Polo Menárguez Cast: Antonio de la Torre, Raúl Arévalo, Chema del Barco	Filmax	
F E B R U A R Y	28	El doble más quince	Director: Mikel Rueda Cast: Germán Alcarazu, Maribel Verdú	Filmax	
M A R C H	6	The Invisible (Invisibles)	Director: Gracia Querejeta Cast: Emma Suárez, Adriana Ozores, Nathalie Poza, Blanca Portillo, Pedro Casablanc, Fernando Cayo	Wanda Visión	
M A R C H	25	The Occupant (Hogar)	Directors: David Pastor, Álex Pastor Cast: Ruth Díaz, Javier Gutiérrez, Mario Casas, Bruna Cusí, David Verdaguer	Netflix	
A P R I L	17	Assembly (Asamblea)	Director: Álex Montoya Cast: Francesc Garrido, Greta Fernández, Cristina Plazas, Nacho Fresneda	Filmin	
J U L Y	3	Wishlist (La lista de los deseos)	Director: Álvaro Díaz Lorenzo Cast: María León, Victoria Abril, Silvia Alonso	A Contracorriente Films	
J U L Y	10	The Curse of the Handsome Man (La maldición del guapo)	Director: Beda Docampo Feijóo Cast: Gonzalo de Castro, Juan Grandinetti, Malena Alterio, Ginés García Millán, Cayetana Guillén Cuervo, Carlos Hipólito, Andrea Duro, Paula Sartor	Filmax	(Note: Co-production Spain–Argentina (80% – 20%).)
J U L Y	17	Superagent Okie Dokie (Superagente Makey)	Director: Alfonso Sánchez Cast: Leo Harlem, Jordi Sánchez, Silvia Abril, Mariam Hernández	DeAPlaneta	
J U L Y	24	Instant Love (Amor en polvo)	Director: Suso Imbernón, Juanjo Moscardó Cast: Macarena Gómez, Enrique Arce, Lorena López, Luis Miguel Seguí	Begin Again Films	
J U L Y	24	Don't Listen (Voces)	Director: Ángel Gómez Cast: Rodolfo Sancho, Ana Fernández, Ramón Barea, Belén Fabra, Lucas Blas, Nerea Barros	eOne Films	
J U L Y	29	Father There Is Only One 2 (Padre no hay más que uno 2. La llegada de la suegra)	Director: Santiago Segura Cast: Santiago Segura, Toni Acosta, Leo Harlem, Silvia Abril	Sony Pictures	
A U G U S T	21	Rosa's Wedding (La boda de Rosa)	Director: Icíar Bollaín Cast: Candela Peña, Sergi López, Nathalie Poza, Ramón Barea, Aina Requena Melgarejo	Filmax	
A U G U S T	28	Unknown Origins (Orígenes secretos)	Director: David Galán Galindo Cast: Javier Rey, Verónica Echegui, Brays Efe, Antonio Resines	Netflix	
S E P T E M B E R	1	Schoolgirls (Las niñas)	Director: Pilar Palomero Cast: Natalia de Molina, Andrea Fandos, Zoe Arnao, Julia Sierra, Francesca Piñón	BTeam Pictures	
S E P T E M B E R	11	The Sea Beyond (Un mundo normal)	Director: Achero Mañas Cast: Ernesto Alterio, Gala Amyach, Ruth Díaz, Magüi Mira, Pau Durà	DeAPlaneta	
S E P T E M B E R	11	So My Grandma's a Lesbian (Salir del ropero)	Director: Ángeles Reiné Cast: Rosa Mª Sardá, Verónica Forqué, Ingrid García-Jonsson, David Verdaguer, Candela Peña, Mónica López	Filmax	
S E P T E M B E R	16	The Paramedic (El practicante)	Director: Carles Torras Cast: Mario Casas, Déborah François	Netflix	
S E P T E M B E R	18	One for All (Uno para todos)	Director: David Ilundain Cast: David Verdaguer, Patricia López Arnáiz, Ana Labordeta, Clara Segura	A Contracorriente Films	
S E P T E M B E R	18	The Offering (L'ofrena)	Director: Ventura Durall Cast: Anna Alarcón, Alex Brendemühl, Verónica Echegui, Pablo Molinero, Josh Climent, Claudia Riera	Alfa Pictures	
S E P T E M B E R	25	Black Beach	Director: Esteban Crespo Cast: Raúl Arévalo, Candela Peña, Paulina García, Melina Matthews	eOne Films	
O C T O B E R	2	Coven (Akelarre)	Director: Pablo Agüero Cast: Amaia Aberasturi, Alex Brendemühl, Daniel Fanego, Daniel Chamorro	Avalon	
O C T O B E R	2	Rifkin's Festival	Director: Woody Allen Cast: Elena Anaya, Louis Garrel, Gina Gershon, Sergi López, Wallace Shawn, Christoph Waltz	Tripictures	
O C T O B E R	2	My Heart Goes Boom! (Explota Explota)	Director: Nacho Álvarez Cast: Ingrid García-Jonsson, Verónica Echegui, Fernando Tejero, Natalia Millán, Fernando Guallar, Pedro Casablanc	Universal Pictures	(Note: Co-production Spain–Italy (80%–20%).)
O C T O B E R	16	Ane Is Missing (Ane)	Director: David Pérez Sañudo Cast: Patricia López Arnáiz, Jone Laspiur, Mikel Losada, Aia Kruse, Luis Callejo	Syldavia Cinema	
O C T O B E R	16	Cross the Line (No matarás)	Director: David Victori Cast: Mario Casas, Milena Smit, Elisabeth Larena	Filmax	
O C T O B E R	30	The People Upstairs (Sentimental)	Director: Cesc Gay Cast: Javier Cámara, Griselda Siciliani, Belén Cuesta, Alberto San Juan	Filmax	
N O V E M B E R	13	The Year of the Discovery (El año del descubrimiento)	Director: Luis López Carrasco	Begin Again Films	
N O V E M B E R	20	Kill Pinochet (Matar a Pinochet)	Director:Juan Ignacio Sabatini Cast: Daniela Ramírez, Cristián Carvajal, Juan Martín Gravina, Gastón Salgado, Julieta Zylberberg, Gabriel Cañas, Mario Horton, Luis Gnecco, Alejandro Goic	Syldavia Cinema	(Note: Co-production Spain–Argentina–Chile (20.00%–27.91%–52.09%).)
D E C E M B E R	4	The Barcelona Vampiress (La vampira de Barcelona)	Director: Lluís Danés Cast: Nora Navas, Roger Casamajor	Filmax	
D E C E M B E R	4	The Summer We Lived (El verano que vivimos)	Director: Carlos Sedes Cast: Blanca Suárez, Javier Rey, Pablo Molinero, María Pedraza	Warner Bros. Pictures	
D E C E M B E R	11	It Snows in Benidorm (Nieva en Benidorm)	Director: Isabel Coixet Cast: Timothy Spall, Sarita Choudhury, Carmen Machi, Pedro Casablanc, Ana Torrent	BTeam Pictures	
D E C E M B E R	11	The Art of Return (El arte de volver)	Director: Pedro Collantes Cast: Macarena García, Nacho Sánchez, Ingrid García-Jonsson, Mireia Oriol, Luka Peros, Lucía Juárez, Celso Bugallo	Filmax	
D E C E M B E R	11	My Mexican Bretzel	Director: Núria Giménez Lorang	Avalon	
D E C E M B E R	18	Sky High (Hasta el cielo)	Director: Daniel Calparsoro Cast: Miguel Herrán, Luis Tosar, Carolina Yuste, Patricia Vico, Fernando Cayo, César Mateo	Universal Pictures	
D E C E M B E R	18	One Careful Owner (El inconveniente)	Director: Bernabé Rico Cast: Juana Acosta, Kiti Mánver, Carlos Areces, José Sacristán, Daniel Grao	Filmax	
D E C E M B E R	18	Baby	Director: Juanma Bajo Ulloa Cast: Rosie Day, Harriet Sansom Harris, Natalia Tena	Festival Films	

== Box office ==
The ten highest-grossing Spanish films in 2020, by domestic box office gross revenue, are as follows:

Highest-grossing films of 2020
Rank	Title	Distributor	Admissions	Domestic gross (€)
1	Father There Is Only One 2 (Padre no hay más que uno 2. La llegada de la suegra)	Sony Pictures	1,892,870	10,554,851.06
2	Adu (Adú)	Paramount Pictures	1,043,387	6,106,114.32
3	32 Malasana Street (Malasaña 32)	Warner Bros. Pictures	586,778	3,607,474.09
4	The Wedding Unplanner (Hasta que la boda nos separe)	A Contracorriente Films	453,429	2,710,429.47
5	Superagent Okie Dokie (Superagente Makey)	DeAPlaneta	273,045	1,508,748.57
6	Eso que tú me das	Warner Bros. Pictures	212,899	1,228,339.19
7	If I Were Rich (Si yo fuera rico) ‡	Paramount Pictures	184,342	1,132,491.41
8	Sky High (Hasta el cielo)	Universal Pictures	169,820	1,042,817.61
9	The Summer We Lived (El verano que vivimos)	Warner Bros. Pictures	155,012	966,268.04
10	Rosa's Wedding (La boda de Rosa)	Filmax	141,550	834,547.06
‡: 2019 theatrical opening

== See also ==
- 35th Goya Awards
- List of 2020 box office number-one films in Spain
