= 13th Gaudí Awards =

Film award ceremony organised by the Catalan Film Academy

- Date: 21 March 2021
- Site: CCIB's auditorium, Barcelona, Catalonia, Spain
- Organized by: Catalan Film Academy

The 13th Gaudí Awards, organised by the Catalan Film Academy, were presented at the CCIB's auditorium in Barcelona on 21 March 2021.

== History ==
The nominations were read by Sergi López and Aina Clotet at La Pedrera's auditorium on 28 January 2021. The Barcelona Vampiress grossed the highest number of nominations, 14.

In addition to the regular awards, Les dues nits d'ahir received the Public's Choice Special Award (which was presented at Calella's Sala Mozart rather than at the CCIB), whereas actress Carme Elías was recognised with the honorary life achievement award.

== Winners and nominees ==
The winners and nominees are listed as follows:

Best Film: The Barcelona Vampiress; The Offering; La dona il·legal; Les dues nits d'ahir	Bet Non-Catalan Language Film: Schoolgirls; Adú; Rosa's Wedding; The People Upstairs
Best Director: Pilar Palomero — Schoolgirls; Cesc Gay — The People Upstairs; Icíar Bollaín — Rosa's Wedding; Lluís Danés — The Barcelona Vampiress	Best Screenplay: Núria Giménez Lorang — My Mexican Bretzel; Cesc Gay — The People Upstairs; Icíar Bollaín, Alicia Luna — Rosa's Wedding; Pilar Palomero — Schoolgirls
Best Actress: Candela Peña — Rosa's Wedding; Andrea Fandos — Schoolgirls; Anna Alarcón — The Offering; Nora Navas — The Barcelona Vampiress	Best Actor: Mario Casas — Cross the Line; Alex Brendemühl — The Offering; David Verdaguer — One for All; Javier Cámara — The People Upstairs
Best Supporting Actress: Verónica Echegui — The Offering; Bruna Cusí — The Barcelona Vampiress; Natalia de Molina — Schoolgirls; Núria Prims — The Barcelona Vampiress	Best Supporting Actor: Alberto San Juan — The People Upstairs; Abdel Aziz El Mountassir — La dona il·legal; Francesc Orella — The Barcelona Vampiress; Ernesto Alterio — I Love You, Stupid
Best Documentary Film: My Mexican Bretzel; ¿Puedes oírme?; La mami; The Mystery of the Pink Flamingo	Best Short Film: Ni oblit ni perdó; Candela; Forastera; Panteres; Vera
Best Television Film: La mort de Guillem; Èxode, de la batalla a la frontera; El crèdit; La fossa	Best Cinematography: Daniela Cajías — Schoolgirls; Bet Rourich — One for All; Josep M. Civit — Baby; Josep M. Civit — The Barcelona Vampiress
Best Production Supervision: Luis Fernández, Anna Parra — Adú; David Masllorens i Silva — The Barcelona Vampiress; Ester Velasco — Cross the Line; Uriel Wisnia — Schoolgirls	Best Art Direction: Lluís Danés — The Barcelona Vampiress; Anna Pujol — The People Upstairs; Balter Gallart — Cross the Line; Mónica Bernuy — Schoolgirls
Best Editing: Núria Giménez Lorang, Cristóbal Fernández — My Mexican Bretzel; Ana Pfaff — La mami; Bernat Aragonés — A Stormy Night; Sofi Escudé — Schoolgirls	Best Original Music: Niño de Elche — Niños somos todos; Alfred Tapscott — The Barcelona Vampiress; Carlos Naya — Schoolgirls; Roque Baños — Adú
Best Costume Design: Mercè Paloma — The Barcelona Vampiress; Anna Güell — The People Upstairs; Arantxa Ezquerro — Schoolgirls; Patricia Monné — Adú	Best Sound: Amanda Villavieja, Fernando Novillo, Alejandra Molina — Schoolgirls; Albert Gay, Irene Rausell, Yasmina Praderas — The People Upstairs; Daniela Fermín, Quique López, Carlos Jiménez — The Barcelona Vampiress; Elena Coderch, Laura Tomás, Yasmina Praderas — Cross the Line
Best Visual Effects: Lluís Rivera, Anna Aragonès, Aleix Torrecillas — The Barcelona Vampiress; Esther Ballesteros, Luis Tinoco — Cross the Line; Lluís Rivera, Àlex Villagrasa — The Occupant; Raúl Romanillos, Míriam Piquer — Adú	Best Makeup and Hairstyles: Laura Pérez, Xavi Valverde — The Barcelona Vampiress; Amparo Sánchez — Rosa's Wedding; Carmen Arbués — Schoolgirls; Patricia Reyes — Cross the Line
Best European Film: Sorry We Missed You; About Endlessness; Longa noite; Little Joe

=== Public's Choice Special Award ===
- Les dues nits d'ahir

=== Honorary Award ===
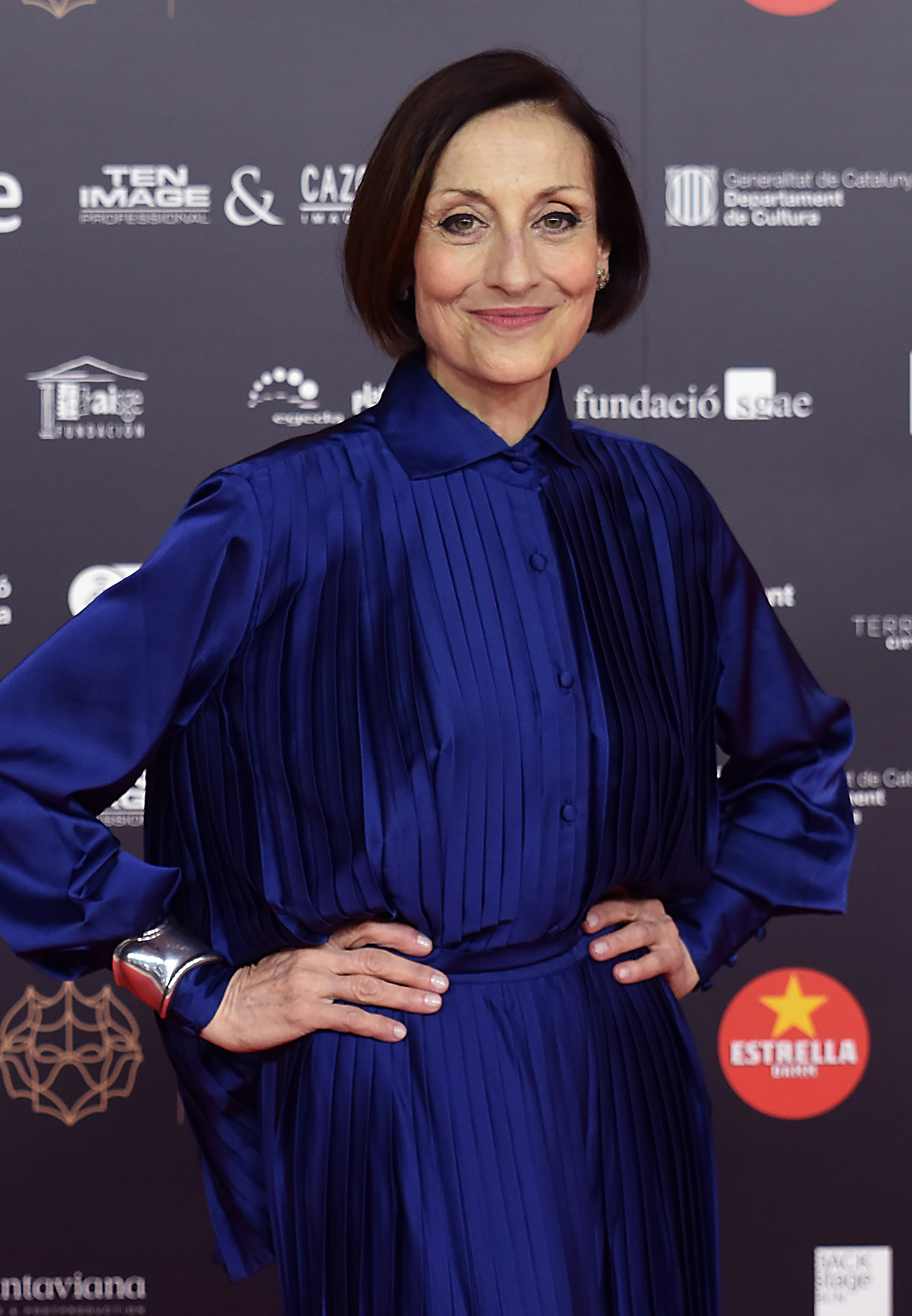
Carme Elías attending the gala's red carpet

Actress Carme Elías was selected as the recipient of the Gaudí honorary award.
