= Ana Ramón Rubio =

Spanish film director, screenwriter, and film producer (born 1985)

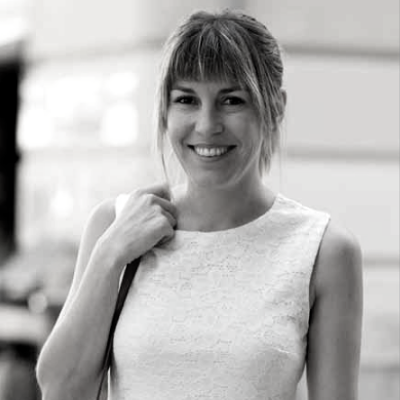
- Born: 1985 (age 40–41); Valencia, Spain
- Occupations: Film director; Screenwriter; Film producer
- Years active: 2013–present
- Known for: Almost Ghosts (2019); Bull Run (2022); Todos queríamos matar al presidente (2018)

Ana Ramón Rubio (born 1985) is a Spanish film director, screenwriter, and film producer from Valencia. She is a member of the Academy of Cinematographic Arts and Sciences of Spain. Her first feature film Almost Ghosts (2019) was nominated for the Goya Awards, and her web series Todos queríamos matar al presidente received three nominations at the IAWTV Awards.

== Early life and career beginnings ==
Between 2013 and 2016, she worked as writer and director of the web series Sin Vida Propia, which won the Grand Jury Prize at the Los Angeles Web Festival, Best Foreign Series at the Vancouver Web Fest in Canada, and was nominated for Best Foreign Series at the Web TV Academy of the United States.

== Career ==
=== Web series and early work (2013–2017) ===
Her short film El Camerino, starring Luis Bermejo, premiered at the Short Film Corner of the Cannes Film Festival in 2017.

Ramón Rubio co-founded the web series section of the Valencia International Film Festival Cinema Jove, which has been active since 2016.

=== Feature films and television (2018–2022) ===
In 2018, she presented the miniseries Todos queríamos matar al presidente at the Marseille Web Fest. The series was later considered the most awarded Spanish web series of 2018 by the Web Series World Cup and subsequently premiered on Amazon Prime Video.

She co-directed La Vall, the first fiction series produced by À Punt, the Valencian public television network that replaced the defunct Canal Nou. The thriller series consisted of 13 episodes starring Marta Belenguer and Nazaret Aracil, with a budget of 100,000 euros per episode.

In October 2019, she premiered her first feature film, the documentary Almost Ghosts, at the Valladolid International Film Festival (SEMINCI). The film won the Best Documentary award at the Arizona International Film Festival and was nominated for the Goya Awards 2020 in categories including Best Documentary, Best Original Screenplay, and Best Direction.

During the COVID-19 pandemic, she premiered La Puerta, a fiction series on Instagram about mysterious disappearances told through Instagram Stories. The series was broadcast for five consecutive days, combining videos, photos, screenshots, audio notes, and television news through short 24-hour videos that told the mystery in real time.

On September 21, 2021, production companies The Immigrant and Cosabona Films announced they would produce her second feature film, Bull Run, financed in less than one day through cryptocurrency and tokenization of the project, integrating it into the blockchain. This documentary about the cryptocurrency craze completed production in late 2022 and premiered at DOC NYC in 2023, winning Best Documentary and Best Song at the Premios Berlanga that year.

=== Recent projects and producer role (2023–present) ===
In October 2024, Nadie Es Perfecto, the production company responsible for films such as El Bar, Pieles, Perfectos Desconocidos, and Disco, Ibiza, Locomía, announced her incorporation as a producer. She leads the development of new productions in the Valencian Community and manages local talent.

Her current projects include Looking For Michael, a road movie based on real events in Valencia that explores how music and Parkinson's disease intertwine in an inspiring story of struggle against adversity. She is also developing Buitres, winner of the DocsMX award for best pitch at the Docsvalencia documentary development laboratory, and is in production of her third documentary feature film, Ridículo.

== Filmography ==
Year	Title	Format	Role	Notes
2013–2016	Sin Vida Propia	Web series	Director, writer	Grand Jury Prize, Los Angeles Web Festival
2017	El Camerino	Short film	Director	Cannes Film Festival Short Film Corner
2018	Somewhere East Jesus	Short film	Director, writer	
2018	Todos queríamos matar al presidente	Web series	Director, writer	Amazon Prime Video
2019	La Vall	Television series	Co-director	À Punt Mèdia
2019	Almost Ghosts	Documentary feature	Director, writer	Goya Award nominee
2020	La Puerta	Web series	Writer	Instagram Stories format
2022	Bull Run	Documentary feature	Director, writer	First tokenized film
2023	Una Terapia Fecomagnética	Short film	Co-writer	
2024	El Pequeño Ladrón	Documentary feature	Co-writer	

== Awards and recognition ==
Year	Award	Category	Work	Result
2014	Los Angeles Web Festival	Grand Jury Prize	Sin Vida Propia	Won
2014	Vancouver Web Fest	Best Foreign Series	Sin Vida Propia	Won
2014	Austin Web Fest	Best Screenplay	Sin Vida Propia	Won
2018	IAWTV Awards	Best Direction	Todos queríamos matar al presidente	Nominated
2018	IAWTV Awards	Best Screenplay	Todos queríamos matar al presidente	Nominated
2018	IAWTV Awards	Best Foreign Series	Todos queríamos matar al presidente	Nominated
2019	Arizona International Film Festival	Best Documentary	Almost Ghosts	Won
2019	Festival de Cine de Madrid - PNR	CIMA Award - Best Female Director	Almost Ghosts	Won
2020	Goya Awards	Best Documentary	Almost Ghosts	Nominated
2020	Goya Awards	Best Original Screenplay	Almost Ghosts	Nominated
2020	Goya Awards	Best Direction	Almost Ghosts	Nominated
2023	Berlanga Awards	Best Documentary	Bull Run	Won
2023	Berlanga Awards	Best Song	Bull Run	Won
