= Pet Peeves (film) =

- Film poster
- Spanish: Pequeños calvarios
- Directed by: Javier Polo
- Screenplay by: David Pascual; Enric Pardo; Guillermo Guerrero
- Produced by: Javier Polo; Gerard Rodríguez; Borka Aracil; Jorge Hernández; Frank Lucas; Guillermo Polo
- Starring: Andrea Duro; Enrique Arce; Vito Sanz; Marta Belenguer; Pablo Molinero; Arturo Valls; Berta Vázquez; Javier Coronas; Rubén Bernal; Lorena López; Raúl Navarro; Sixto Javier García; Mamen García; José Miguel López
- Cinematography: Beatriz Sastre
- Edited by: Ernesto Arnal; Vicente Ibáñez; Yago Muñoz
- Music by: Juanma Pastor Labrandero; Carlos Ortigosa Karlsound
- Production companies: Los Hermanos Polo Films; Japonica Films; Paloma Negra; Whiskey Content; Pequeños calvarios AIE
- Distributed by: Syldavia Cinema
- Release dates: 19 March 2025 (Málaga); 24 October 2025 (Spain)
- Countries: Spain; Mexico
- Language: Spanish

Pet Peeves (Spanish: Pequeños calvarios) is a 2025 ensemble comedy film directed by Javier Polo from a screenplay by David Pascual, Enric Pardo, and Guillermo Guerrero. It straddles black and surreal comedy. Its cast includes Andrea Duro, Enrique Arce, Vito Sanz, Marta Belenguer, Pablo Molinero, Arturo Valls, and Berta Vázquez, among others.

== Plot ==
The plot consists of standalone stories making fun of absurd misfortunes stitched together by the story of clockmaker Carlo.

== Cast ==
- Pablo Molinero as Carlo, the clockmaker
- Andrea Duro as Paola
- Vito Sanz as Vicent
- Rubén Bernal as Pisco
- Marta Belenguer as Sofía
- Enrique Arce as Manuel
- Arturo Valls
- Berta Vázquez
- Lorena López
- Javier Coronas
- Mamen García
- Sixto García

== Production ==
The screenplay was written by David Pascual, Enric Pardo, and Guillermo Guerrero. The film is a Spanish-Mexican co-production by Los Hermanos Polo and Japonica Films alongside Paloma Negra Films and Whisky Content, and it received backing from IVC and ICAA and it had the involvement of À Punt. It was fully shot in the Valencian Community, including locations such as Castellón de la Plana and Benicàssim.

== Release ==
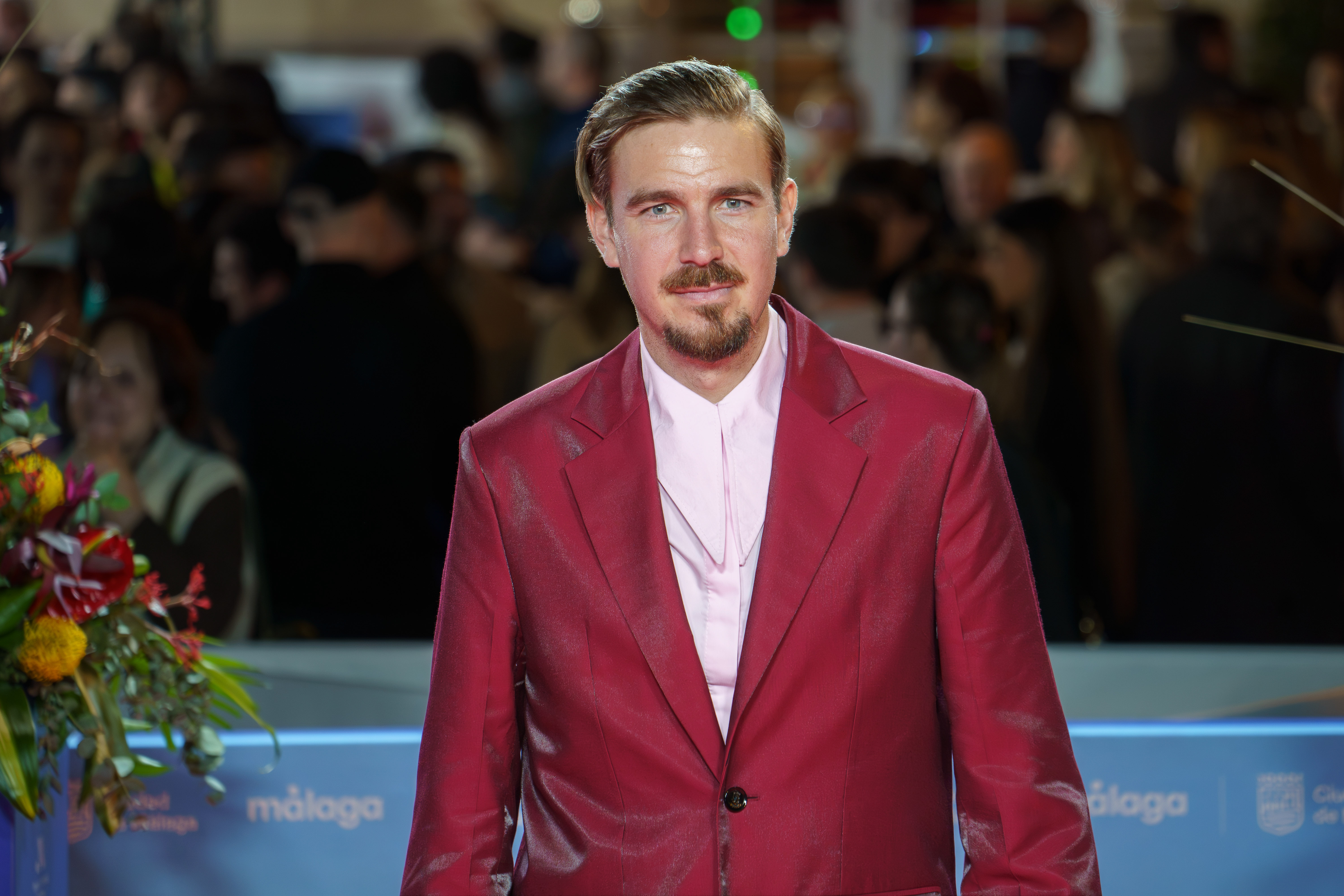
Polo attending the red carpet of the 28th Málaga Film Festival on 19 March 2025

The film was presented at the 28th Málaga Film Festival on 19 March 2025. It was also programmed at the Alicante Film Festival and at Cinema Jove.

Syldavia Cinema planned a Spanish theatrical rollout for 24 October 2025.

== Reception ==
Alfonso Rivera of Cineuropa pointed out that the director/producer "resorts to pop art as a light-hearted way of looking at the world and ourselves".

== Accolades ==
Year	Award	Category	Nominee(s)	Result	Ref.
2025	8th Lola Gaos Awards	Best Film		Nominated	
2025	8th Lola Gaos Awards	Best Director	Javier Polo	Nominated	
2025	8th Lola Gaos Awards	Best Actor	Vito Sanz	Nominated	
2025	8th Lola Gaos Awards	Best Supporting Actor	Arturo Valls	Nominated	
2025	8th Lola Gaos Awards	Best Costume Design	Ruth Sempere	Won	
2025	8th Lola Gaos Awards	Best Art Direction	Mireia Soto	Nominated	
2025	8th Lola Gaos Awards	Best Sound	Martín Touron, Xavier Mulet, Mario González, Mayte Cabrera	Nominated	
2025	8th Lola Gaos Awards	Best Editing	Ernesto Arnal, Vicente Ibáñez, Yago Muñiz	Nominated	
2025	8th Lola Gaos Awards	Best Cinematography and Lighting	Beatriz Sastre	Won	
2025	8th Lola Gaos Awards	Best Original Song	"Pequeños calvarios" by Jhonny B. Zero	Nominated	

== See also ==
- List of Spanish films of 2025
