= Devil Dog Road =

- Film poster
- Spanish: Lo carga el diablo
- Directed by: Guillermo Polo
- Screenplay by: Guillermo Polo; David Pascual; Guillermo Guerrero; Vicente Peñarocha
- Starring: Pablo Molinero; Mero González; Isak Férriz; Antonia San Juan; Emilio Buale; Luifer Rodríguez; Manuel de Blas; Paco Montesdeoca; Itziar Castro
- Cinematography: Pablo G. Gallego
- Edited by: Ernesto Arnal; Vicente Ibañez; Óscar Santamaría
- Music by: Pablo Croissier
- Production companies: Los Hermanos Polo Films; Japónica Films; Volcano Films; Batiak Films
- Distributed by: Begin Again Films
- Release dates: 10 April 2024 (MFF); 25 April 2025 (Spain)
- Country: Spain
- Language: Spanish

Devil Dog Road (Spanish: Lo carga el diablo) is a 2024 Spanish black comedy road movie directed by Guillermo Polo in his directorial debut feature. It stars Pablo Molinero and Mero González.

== Plot ==
With the prospect of earning €20,000, middling writer Tristán agrees on fulfilling his conflictive brother Simón's death wish of transporting his dead body from Avilés to Benidorm, enlisting the help of teenager Álex.

== Cast ==
- Pablo Molinero as Tristán
- Mero González as Álex
- Isak Férriz as Simón
- Antonia San Juan as Merche
- Emilio Buale as Babik
- Luifer Rodríguez as Zarzo
- Manuel de Blas as padre de Merche ('Merche's father')
- Pino Montesdeoca as Greta
- Itziar Castro as señora Bermúdez

== Production ==
The film was produced by Los Hermanos Polo Films, Japónica Films, Volcano Films, and Batiak Films, with the participation of À Punt and the backing from Gobierno de Canarias and the support of IVC. It had a budget of around €750,000. Shooting locations included Tenerife, the provinces of Valencia and Alicante, and Aragon.

== Release ==
For its world premiere on 10 April 2024, the film made it to the slate of the 41st Miami Film Festival (MFF). It also screened as the opening film of the 39th Cinema Jove festival in June 2024 and was included in the 'Castilla y León en largo' programme of the 69th Valladolid International Film Festival (Seminci). It is scheduled to be released theatrically in Spain on 25 April 2025.

== Reception ==
Alfonso Rivera of Cineuropa billed the film as "a trippy, colourful road movie, halfway between comic and US indie film, but at the same time just as Iberian as a Bigas Luna flick".

Philipp Engel of Cinemanía rated the film 4 out of 5 stars, writing that in the film, a cross between Jamón, jamón and Wild at Heart, the [positive] values go beyond aesthetic delights, also including its sense of humor, its music, and the "now forever iconic" villain portrayed by Antonia San Juan.

Manuel J. Lombardo of Diario de Sevilla rated the film 2 out of 5 stars, determining it to be "an amusement full of clichés and stereotypes" from a certain 80s and 90s indie cinema that Polo sets out hoping that a complicit and nostalgic viewer be able to catch the references and laugh at them.

Carmen L. Lobo of La Razón rated the film 3 out of 5 stars, declaring it a "an amusing black comedy with a freshness and brass that is welcome these days".

== Accolades ==
Year	Award	Category	Nominee(s)	Result	Ref.
2025	7th Lola Gaos Awards	Best Director	Guillermo Polo	Nominated	
2025	7th Lola Gaos Awards	Best Actor	Pablo Molinero	Nominated	
2025	7th Lola Gaos Awards	Best Editing and Post-Production	Ernesto Arnal, Vicente Ibáñez, Óscar Santamaría	Nominated	
2025	7th Lola Gaos Awards	Best Art Direction	Carla Fuentes, Alba de la Asunción	Nominated	
2025	7th Lola Gaos Awards	Best Original Song	"Sueño intergaláctico"	Nominated	

== See also ==
- List of Spanish films of 2025
