= Solarium (film) =

- Directed by: Jonathan Koulavsky
- Written by: Jonathan Koulavsky
- Produced by: Alice Bloch
- Starring: Théo Bellet, Alexandre de Jésus, Malik Delaroche, Viktoria Kozlova
- Edited by: Daniel Darmon
- Release date: October 2021
- Running time: 30mn
- Country: France

Solarium is a 2021 French short film directed by Jonathan Koulavsky. The thirty-minute story follows a young driver of trot racing as he experiences self-doubt, frustration, and isolation. The short has been presented at a number of festivals, including the 2022 Rhode Island International Film Festival. The film is part of the 2023 César Narrative Short Films Selection.

== Plot ==
Johnny, a 16-year-old rider who dreams of one day becoming a trot champion, is faced with self-doubt when he realises that his horse, Coquelicot, is at risk for not being good enough.

== Reception ==
Since its release, the film has been selected in various festivals and academies around the world

Year	Festivals	Award/Category	Status
2021	Unifrance Short Film Awards	Grand Prix Unifiance	Won
2022	Huesca International Film Festival	International Danzante Award	Won
2022	Flickers' RhodeIsland International Film Festival	Best Editing	Won
2022	Contis International Film Festival	Youth Jury Award	Won
2022	Valencia Cinema Jove International Film Festival	Grand Prix	Nominated
