= The Offering (2020 film) =

- Catalan theatrical release poster
- Catalan: L'ofrena
- Directed by: Ventura Durall
- Screenplay by: Ventura Durall; Guillem Sala; Sandra Beltrán; Clara Roquet
- Starring: Anna Alarcón; Alex Brendemühl; Verónica Echegui; Pablo Molinero; Josh Climent; Claudia Riera
- Cinematography: Alex García
- Edited by: Marc Roca
- Music by: Alberto R. Lucendo
- Production companies: Nanouk Films; Fasten Films; Suica Films; Bord Cadre Films
- Distributed by: Alfa Pictures
- Release dates: 23 August 2020 (Málaga); 18 September 2020 (Spain)
- Country: Spain
- Language: Catalan

The Offering (Catalan: L'ofrena) is a 2020 Spanish thriller drama film directed by Ventura Durall which stars Anna Alarcón, Alex Brendemühl, and Verónica Echegui alongside Pablo Molinero, Josh Climent, and Claudia Riera. It is primarily shot in Catalan.

== Plot ==
A married psychiatrist (Violeta) meets with a patient (Rita), a porn actress who was in a relationship with Jan, Violeta's childhood flirt who marked her life. Rita reveals Violeta that Jan is still obsessed with her after decades, willing to amend his past mistakes with Violeta. The plot features two timelines, one in the present time, and a past one featuring young Violeta and Jan.

== Cast ==
- Anna Alarcón as Violeta
- Alex Brendemühl as Jan
- Verónica Echegui as Rita
- Pablo Molinero as Violeta's husband
- Josh Climent as young Jan
- Claudia Riera as young Violeta

== Production ==
The screenplay was penned by Ventura Durall alongside Guillem Sala, Sandra Beltrán, and Clara Roquet. The film is a Nanouk Films, Fasten Films, Suica Films and Bord Cadre Films production, with funding from ICAA, ICEC, and IVAC, and in association with TV3. It was shot in Barcelona and the Valencia region (including the Serra d'Irta, Sagunto, and Buñol).

== Release ==
The film was presented at the 23rd Málaga Film Festival on 23 August 2020. Distributed by Alfa Pictures, it was theatrically released in Spain on 18 September 2020.

== Reception ==
Jordi Batlle Caminal of Fotogramas rated the film 3 out of 5 stars, highlighting an "extremely committed" Echegui, playing a "complex and difficult character", as the best thing about the film, while citing the lack of plausibility in some of the characters' attitudes as a negative point.

Beatriz Martínez of El Periódico de Catalunya rated The Offering 3 out of 5 stars, considering that the film (featuring an intensity "bordering on Greek-tragedy levels" and a group of actors "working their tails off") is worth watching insofar the viewer be able to get involved in the depicted "swirl of obsessions and guilt", even though the experience may be erratic.

Phil Hoad of The Guardian rated the film 3 out of 5 stars, lamenting that the "torrid and sophisticated story", "wrapped in Hitchcockian shadow, fascinated by questions of identity, desire and time" is limited by a "humdrum televisual ambience that's a bit unsatisfying".

Elsa Fernández-Santos of El País assessed that despite some flashes and a "certain suspense in its erotic voltage", everything in the film is subject to its "absurd writing".

Rubén Romero Santos of Cinemanía rated the film 3½ out of 5 stars, considering that, despite its beginning, the film veers towards a more conventional drama about the need for forgiveness, with the ability to create an unhealthy tension being the film's most relevant feature alongside the "magnetic" performance by Riera.

== Accolades ==
Year	Award	Category	Nominee(s)	Result	Ref.
2021	13th Gaudí Awards	Best Film		Nominated	
2021	13th Gaudí Awards	Best Actress	Anna Alarcón	Nominated	
2021	13th Gaudí Awards	Best Actor	Alex Brendemühl	Nominated	
2021	13th Gaudí Awards	Best Supporting Actress	Verónica Echegui	Won	

== See also ==
- List of Spanish films of 2020
