= Unicorns (2023 Spanish film) =

- Film poster
- Spanish: Unicornios
- Directed by: Àlex Lora
- Screenplay by: Marta Vivet; Pilar Palomero; María Mínguez; Àlex Lora
- Produced by: Valérie Delpierre; Miguel Molina; Adán Aliaga
- Starring: Greta Fernández; Nora Navas; Elena Martín; Pablo Molinero
- Cinematography: Thais Català
- Production companies: Inicia Films; Jaibo Films
- Distributed by: Filmax
- Release dates: 15 March 2023 (Málaga); 30 June 2023 (Spain)
- Country: Spain
- Languages: Spanish; Catalan

Unicorns (Spanish: Unicornios; Catalan: Unicorns) is a 2023 drama film directed by Àlex Lora starring Greta Fernández alongside Elena Martín, Nora Navas, and Pablo Molinero.

== Plot ==
The life of young, polyamorous and ambitious Isa begins to crumble as, undecided about committing to a stable monogamous relationship with Guillem, she returns to her family's home with her mother.

== Cast ==
- Greta Fernández as Isa
- Elena Martín as Abril
- Nora Navas as Mercè
- Pablo Molinero as Mikel
- Lidia Casanova as Gabi
- Alejandro Pau as Guillem
- Sònia Ninyerola as Marta

== Production ==
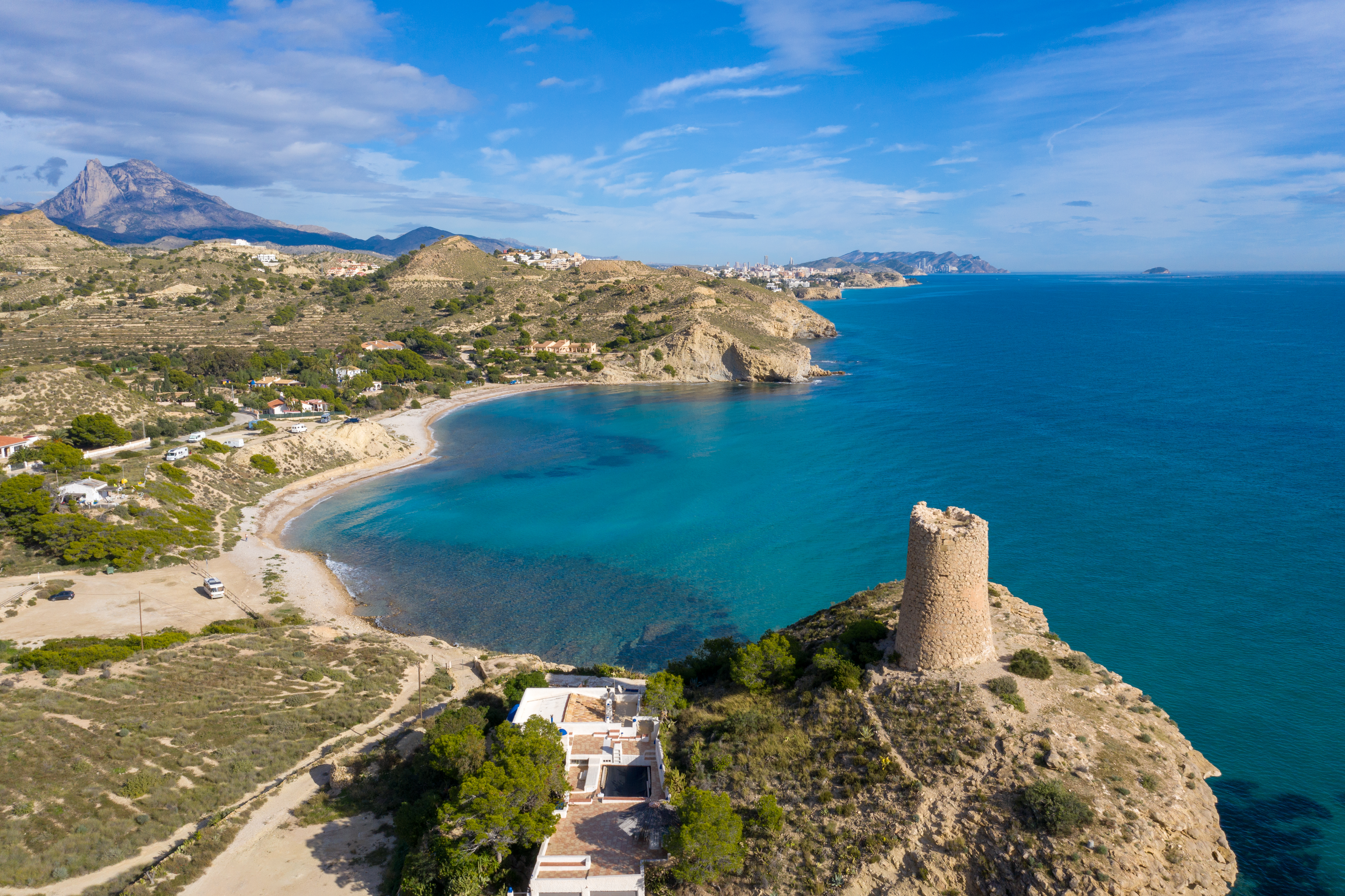
Footage was shot in Cala el Xarco

The screenplay is a loose adaptation of Sofía Ros' novel Mi casa en llamas, which deviates from the original work in primarily focusing on the protagonist's personal transformation. It was penned by Marta Vivet, Pilar Palomero, María Mínguez and Àlex Lora. The film was produced by Inicia Films alongside Jaibo Films, with support from of TV3, IB3, ICEC, Movistar+ and Creative Europe's MEDIA. Thais Català worked as cinematographer.

Filming began in the province of Alicante, with some footage shot in Cala el Xarco (Villajoyosa), also shooting in Barcelona.

== Release ==
The film is distributed by Filmax. Upon the wrapping of shooting, its theatrical release in Spain was expected for 2022. The film made it to the 26th Málaga Film Festival's official selection slate and was presented on 15 March 2023. It was scheduled to be released theatrically in Spain on 19 May 2023. Its release date was later reported to be 30 June 2023.

== Reception ==
Toni Vall of Cinemanía rated the film 4 out of 5 stars, writing that it manages to "portray in depth the emptiness of our world", without being wishy-washy.

Quim Casas of El Periódico de Catalunya rated the film 2 out of 5 stars, deeming it to be "a somewhat erratic film about an erratic character".

== Accolades ==
Year	Award	Category	Nominee(s)	Result	Ref.
2023	6th Berlanga Awards	Best Film		Nominated	
2023	6th Berlanga Awards	Best Director	Àlex Lora	Nominated	
2023	6th Berlanga Awards	Best Actress	Greta Fernández	Nominated	
2023	6th Berlanga Awards	Best Supporting Actress	Inma Sancho	Won	
2023	6th Berlanga Awards	Best Supporting Actress	Isabel Requena	Nominated	
2023	6th Berlanga Awards	Best Supporting Actor	Pablo Molinero	Nominated	
2023	6th Berlanga Awards	Best Screenplay	María Mínguez, Marta Vivet, Pilar Palomero, Álex Lora	Nominated	
2023	6th Berlanga Awards	Best Editing and Post-Production	Mariona Soler, Alex Lora	Nominated	
2023	6th Berlanga Awards	Best Cinematography and Lighting	Thais Català	Nominated	
2023	6th Berlanga Awards	Best Art Direction	Julia Yolanda	Nominated	
2023	6th Berlanga Awards	Best Production Supervision	Maica Sanz	Nominated	
2023	6th Berlanga Awards	Best Original Score	Isabel Latorre	Nominated	

== See also ==
- List of Spanish films of 2023
