= Swarm (film) =

- Catalan: Eixam
- Directed by: Óscar Bernàcer
- Written by: Joana M. Ortueta; Jorge Juan Martínez
- Produced by: Jordi Llorca Llinares; Araceli Isaac Delso; Oriol Maynó; Óscar Bernàcer; Joana M. Ortueta; Iván Martínez-Rufat; Pilar Llorca Rubio; Núria Doménech
- Starring: Pablo Molinero; Cristina Fernández Pintado; Pablo Derqui; María Maroto; Gloria March; Jordi Aguilar; Marta Belenguer; Àngel Figols; Abdelatif Hwidar; Elías Hwidar; June Bernàcer
- Cinematography: Víctor Entrecanales
- Edited by: Vicente Navarro
- Music by: Raquel Sánchez
- Production companies: Nakamura Films; Maqueta Films; Corte y Confección de Películas
- Distributed by: A Contracorriente Films
- Release date: 4 September 2026
- Running time: 100 minutes
- Country: Spain
- Language: Catalan

Swarm (Catalan: Eixam) is a 2026 Spanish rural thriller film directed by Óscar Bernàcer starring Pablo Molinero. It is shot in Valencian (Catalan).

== Plot ==
Lluc, a civil engineer who is going through a rough patch, arrives in an isolate rural community run by Alba in the hamlet of Malpàs, and manages to find his place in the seemingly idyllic community, but eventually the perversion of the system devised by Alba threatens him.

== Cast ==
- Pablo Molinero as Lluc
- Cristina Fernández Pintado as Alba
- Pablo Derqui as Jordi
- Àngel Fígols as Ernest
- María Maroto as Silvia
- Jordi Aguilar as Blai
- Marta Belenguer
- Glòria March
- Abdelatif Hwidar
- Elías Hwidar
- June Bernàcer Martínez
- Nuria Herrero
- Neus Asensi

== Production ==
Known under the working title of En L'Eixam ('In the Swarm') during the production stage, the film was produced by Nakamura Films, Maqueta Films, and Corte y Confección de Películas. It had the participation of Netflix, RTVE, À Punt, and CreaSGR. Shooting locations in the Valencian Community included Bejís, El Toro, Torás, Chelva, and Calles.

== Release ==
Distributed by A Contracorriente Films, the film was released theatrically in Spain on 4 September 2026. Feelsales secured international sales.

== Reception ==
Raquel Hernández Luján of HobbyConsolas gave the film a 67-point score, highlighting "how the mood gradually thickens as the film progresses, eventually creating a suffocating atmosphere”" as the best thing about it.

Carmen L. Lobo of La Razón gave the film a 3½ star rating, singling out "its unsettling atmosphere" and the way "the filmmaker knows how to keep the tension going throughout", as the best things about it.

In a 3-star rating, Luis Martínez of El Mundo assessed that the film "fully achieves its goal of disorienting, unsettling, and under no circumstances allowing the viewer to settle in".

Philipp Engel of Cinemanía rated the film 4 out of 5 stars, deeming it to be a tense rural thriller that, overall, works very well, mentioning the film's apparent effort to prove that community life doesn't work as the only potential drawback.

== Accolades ==
| Year | Award | Category | Nominee(s) | Result | Ref. |
|---|---|---|---|---|---|
| 2026 | 9th Lola Gaos Awards | Best Director | Óscar Bernàcer | Pending | |
| 2026 | 9th Lola Gaos Awards | Best Actress | Cristina Fernández Pintado | Pending | |
| 2026 | 9th Lola Gaos Awards | Best Actor | Pablo Molinero | Pending | |
| 2026 | 9th Lola Gaos Awards | Best Supporting Actress | Gloria March | Pending | |
| 2026 | 9th Lola Gaos Awards | Best Supporting Actress | María Maroto | Pending | |
| 2026 | 9th Lola Gaos Awards | Best Supporting Actor | Abdelatif Hwidar | Pending | |
| 2026 | 9th Lola Gaos Awards | Best Supporting Actor | Elías Hwidar | Pending | |
| 2026 | 9th Lola Gaos Awards | Best Supporting Actor | Jordi Aguilar | Pending | |
| 2026 | 9th Lola Gaos Awards | Best Screenplay | Joana M. Ortueta, Jorge Juan Martínez | Pending | |
| 2026 | 9th Lola Gaos Awards | Best Cinematography and Lighting | Víctor Entrecanales | Pending | |
| 2026 | 9th Lola Gaos Awards | Best Editing | Vicente Navarro | Pending | |
| 2026 | 9th Lola Gaos Awards | Best Production Supervision | Gloria Guillot | Pending | |
| 2026 | 9th Lola Gaos Awards | Best Art Direction | Maje Tarazona | Pending | |
| 2026 | 9th Lola Gaos Awards | Best Original Score | Raquel Sánchez | Pending | |
| 2026 | 9th Lola Gaos Awards | Best Original Song | "La mentida" by La Maria | Pending | |
| 2026 | 9th Lola Gaos Awards | Best Sound | Dani Navarro, Martín Touron, Iván Rufat | Pending | |
| 2026 | 9th Lola Gaos Awards | Best Costume Design | Giovanna Ribes | Pending | |
| 2026 | 9th Lola Gaos Awards | Best Makeup and Hairstyles | Alba Colorus | Pending | |

== See also ==
- List of Spanish films of 2026
