= The Barcelona Vampiress =

- Theatrical release poster
- Catalan: La vampira de Barcelona
- Directed by: Lluís Danés
- Screenplay by: Maria Jaén; Lluís A. Martínez
- Produced by: Raimon Masllorens
- Starring: Roger Casamajor; Nora Navas; Bruna Cusí; Francesc Orella; Sergi López; Mario Gas; Núria Prims
- Cinematography: Josep Maria Civit
- Music by: Alfred Tapscott
- Production companies: Brutal Media; Filmax
- Distributed by: Filmax
- Release dates: October 2020 (Sitges); 4 December 2020 (Spain)
- Country: Spain
- Language: Catalan

The Barcelona Vampiress (Catalan: La vampira de Barcelona) is a 2020 Spanish historical thriller film directed by Lluís Danés which stars Nora Navas as the title character and Roger Casamajor alongside Bruna Cusí, Francesc Orella, Sergi López, Mario Gas, and Núria Prims. It is shot in Catalan.

== Plot ==
Set in 1912 Barcelona, the plot concerns about the endeavours of morphine-addicted journalist Sebastià Comas to unravel the truth about the kidnappings and killings of children scapegoated by the police to Enriqueta Martí, nicknamed as the "Vampire of the Raval".

== Cast ==
- Roger Casamajor as Sebastià Comas
- Nora Navas as Enriqueta Martí
- Bruna Cusí as Amèlia
- Francesc Orella as Salvat
- Sergi López as policia Amorós
- Mario Gas as Sr. Méndez
- Núria Prims as Madame
- Pablo Derqui as Fuster
- Francesca Piñón as Sor Engracia

== Production ==
The screenplay was penned by Maria Jaén and Lluís A. Martínez. The film is a Brutal Media and Filmax production, with the participation of TVC.

== Release ==
The film was presented at the 53rd Sitges Film Festival in October 2020. Distributed by Filmax, the film was theatrically released in Spain on 4 December 2020.

== Reception ==
Javier Ocaña of El País deemed the film to be "an ambitious, sometimes grandiloquent work, which always comes to fruition with courage and singularity" when retelling the events of 1912, managing to portray a country's moral mystery.

Toni Vall of Cinemanía rated the film 2½ out of 5 stars, pointing out that the cast was "uneven", featuring "a solvent but not brilliant [male] lead", with Danés otherwise rather pulling his best in the representation of the setting (El Raval).

== Accolades ==
Year	Award	Category	Nominee(s)	Result	Ref.
2021	13th Gaudí Awards	Best Film		Won	
2021	13th Gaudí Awards	Best Director	Lluís Danés	Nominated	
2021	13th Gaudí Awards	Best Actress	Nora Navas	Nominated	
2021	13th Gaudí Awards	Best Production Supervision	David Masllorens i Silva	Nominated	
2021	13th Gaudí Awards	Best Art Direction	Lluís Danés	Won	
2021	13th Gaudí Awards	Best Supporting Actress	Bruna Cusí	Nominated	
2021	13th Gaudí Awards	Best Supporting Actress	Núria Prims	Nominated	
2021	13th Gaudí Awards	Best Supporting Actor	Francesc Orella	Nominated	
2021	13th Gaudí Awards	Best Original Music	Alfred Tapscott	Nominated	
2021	13th Gaudí Awards	Best Cinematography	Josep M. Civit	Nominated	
2021	13th Gaudí Awards	Best Costume Design	Mercè Paloma	Won	
2021	13th Gaudí Awards	Best Sound	Daniela Fermín, Quique López, Carlos Jiménez	Nominated	
2021	13th Gaudí Awards	Best Visual Effects	Lluís Rivera, Aleix Torrecillas, Anna Aragonès	Won	
2021	13th Gaudí Awards	Best Makeup and Hairstyles	Laura Pérez, Xavi Valverde	Won	

== See also ==
- List of Spanish films of 2020
