= Inconscientes =

Unconscious
- Theatrical release poster
- Spanish: Inconscientes
- Directed by: Joaquín Oristrell
- Written by: Joaquín Oristrell; Teresa de Pelegrí; Dominic Harari
- Produced by: Gerardo Herrero
- Starring: Leonor Watling; Luis Tosar; Mercedes Sampietro; Juanjo Puigcorbé; Núria Prims; Alex Brendemühl
- Cinematography: Jaume Peracaula
- Edited by: Miguel Ángel Santamaría
- Music by: Sergio Moure
- Production companies: Tornasol Films; Messidor Films; EMC Asset Management; Madragoa Produção de Filmes; Classic
- Distributed by: Alta Classics
- Release date: 27 August 2004 (Spain)
- Running time: 108 minutes
- Countries: Spain; Italy; Germany; Portugal
- Language: Spanish

Unconscious (Spanish: Inconscientes) is a 2004 period comedy film directed by Joaquín Oristrell starring Leonor Watling and Luis Tosar, also featuring Mercedes Sampietro, Juanjo Puigcorbé, Núria Prims and Alex Brendemühl in supporting roles.

Set in 1913 Barcelona and displaying the popularization of the theories of psychoanalysis as a backdrop, the plot follows the pregnant wife of a renowned Freudian psychiatrist who enlists the help of her admiring brother-in-law to uncover the elaborate mystery of why her husband ran away from home. The more she digs for the truth about her husband, the more she discovers the unexpected lies surrounding her brother-in-law, her father, her sister, and herself.

It is an international co-production by companies from Spain, Italy, Germany and Portugal.

== Plot ==
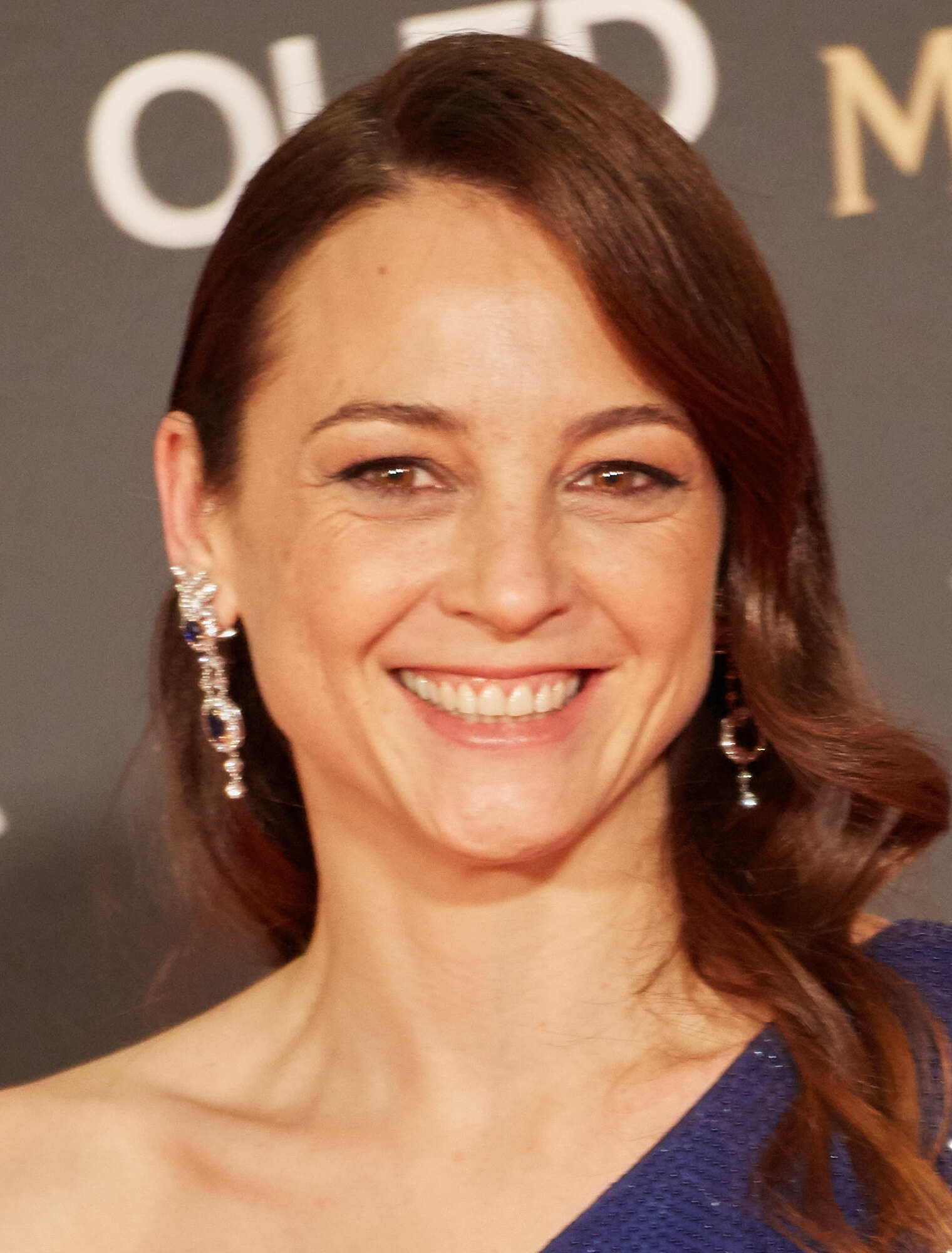
Leonor Watling plays Alma Mira, who enlists the help of her sister's husband, the dispassionate, repressed psychiatrist, Dr. Salvador Pitfarré, to help her solve the mystery of her husband Leon's fugue state.

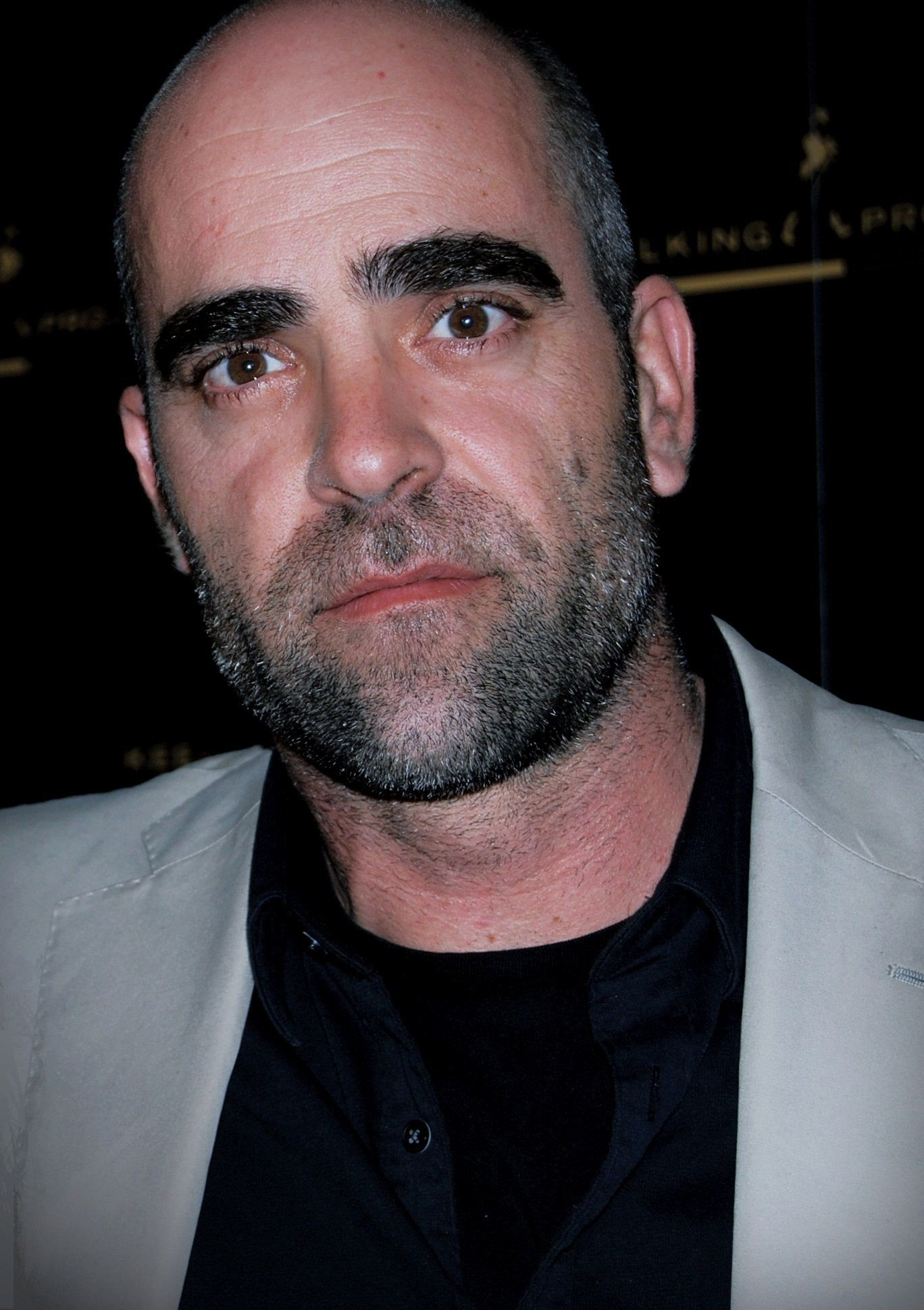
Luis Tosar plays Salvador Pitfarré, secretly in love with Alma, Salvador agrees to help her follow clues in Leon's psychological thesis The Hysterical Woman: Four Cases, based on Freudian theories applied to four patients.

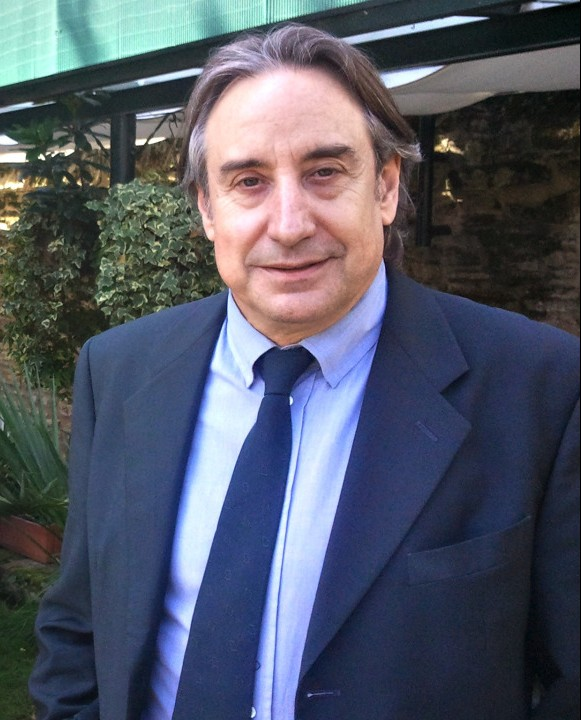
Juanjo Puigcorbé plays Doctor Mira, who encouraged Leon to ignore a shocking discovery to avoid scandal, attempting to bribe Leon's silence by appointing him successor as Director of the psychiatric hospital.

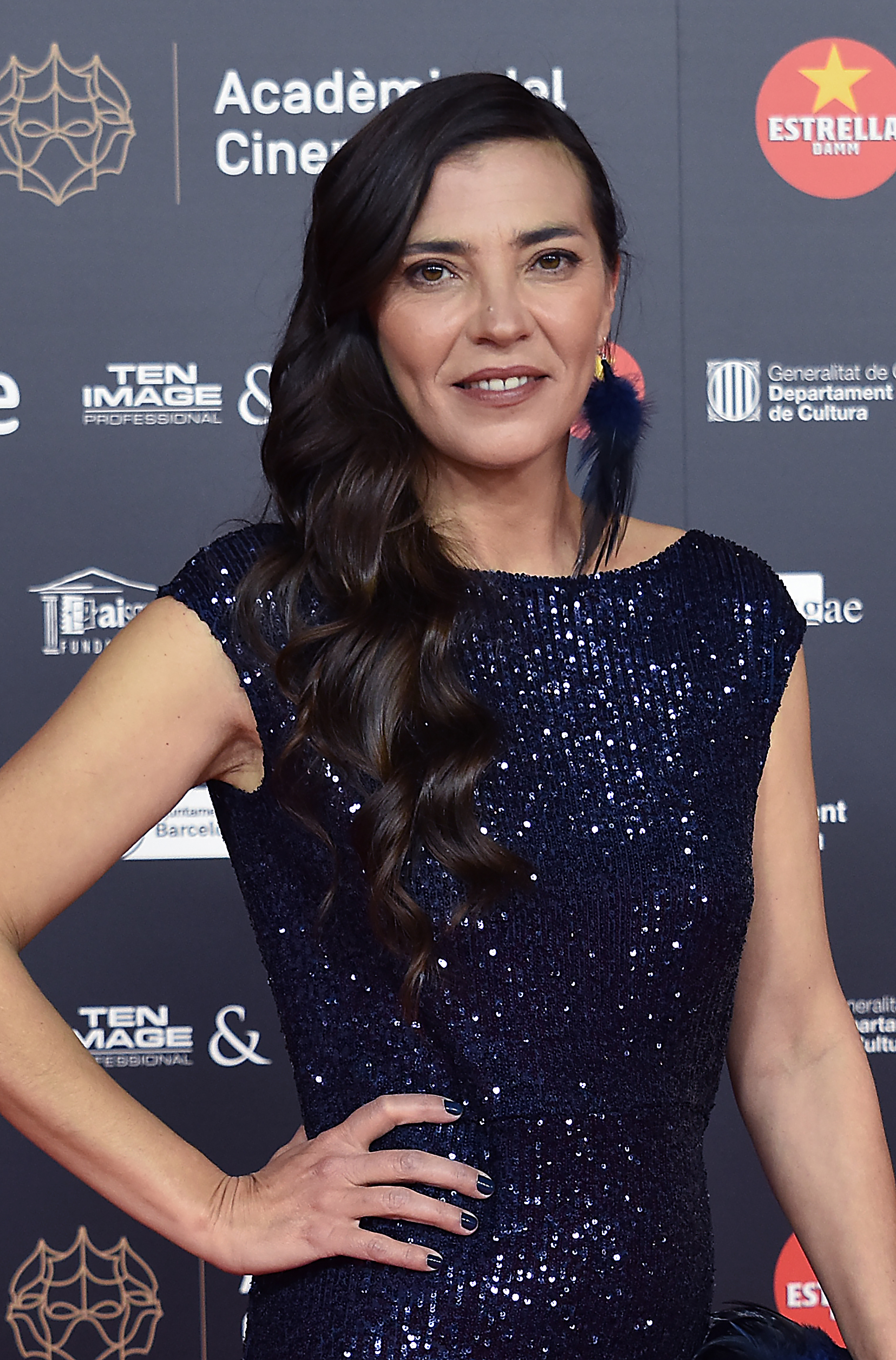
Núria Prims plays Olivia Mira/Señora Ducati, Salvador's his prim, frigid wife and Alma's sister, who has intense sibling rivalry. Drugging Salvador every Tuesday, Olivia slips out with her lesbian lover, "Francis" to attend transvestite costume parties.

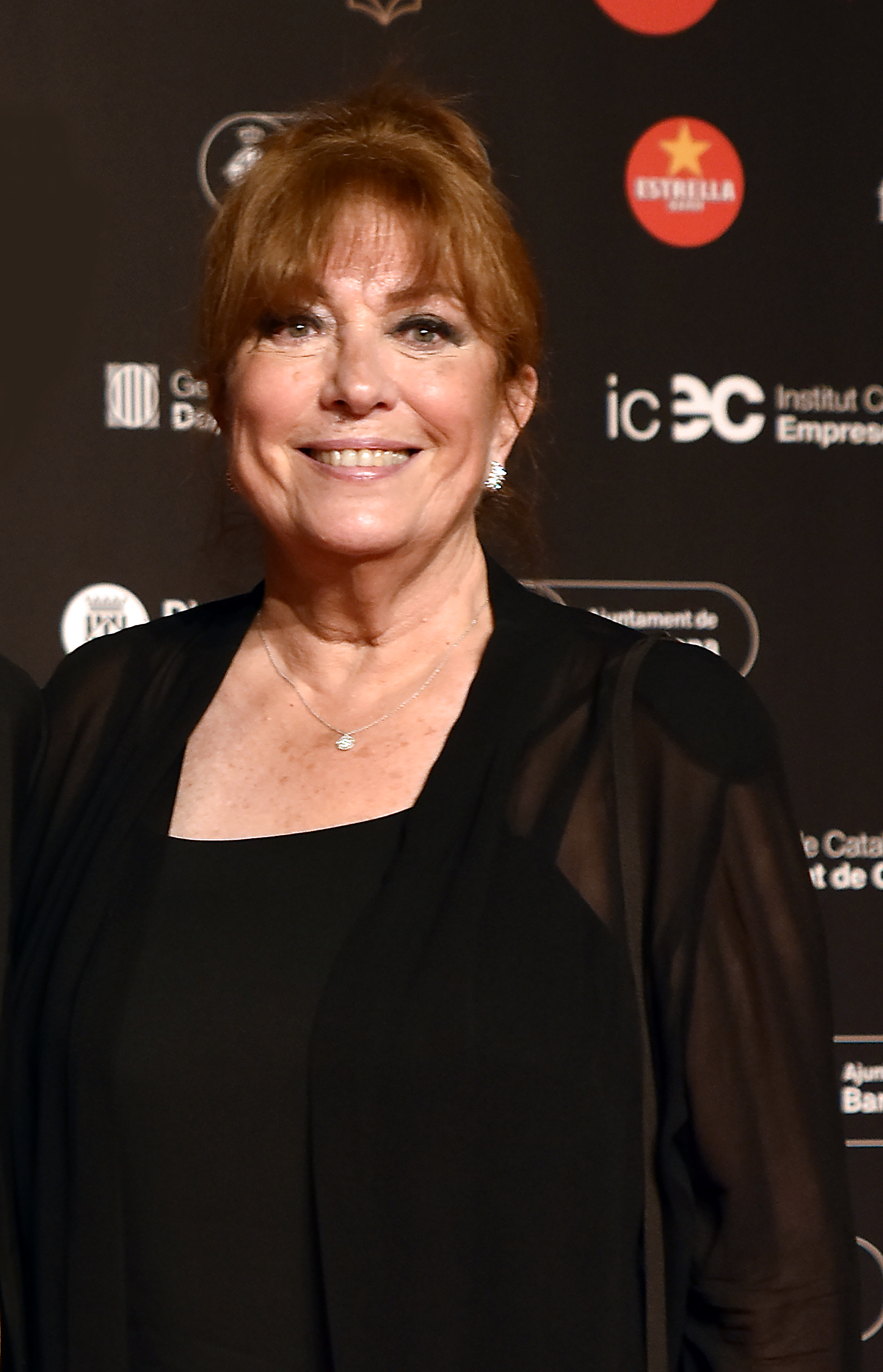
Mercedes Sampietro plays Señora Mingarro. In his youth, Mira, the son of the household, seduced and impregnated the maid, who as Señora Mingarro works as housekeeper for her unknowing son, Dr. Leon Pardo.

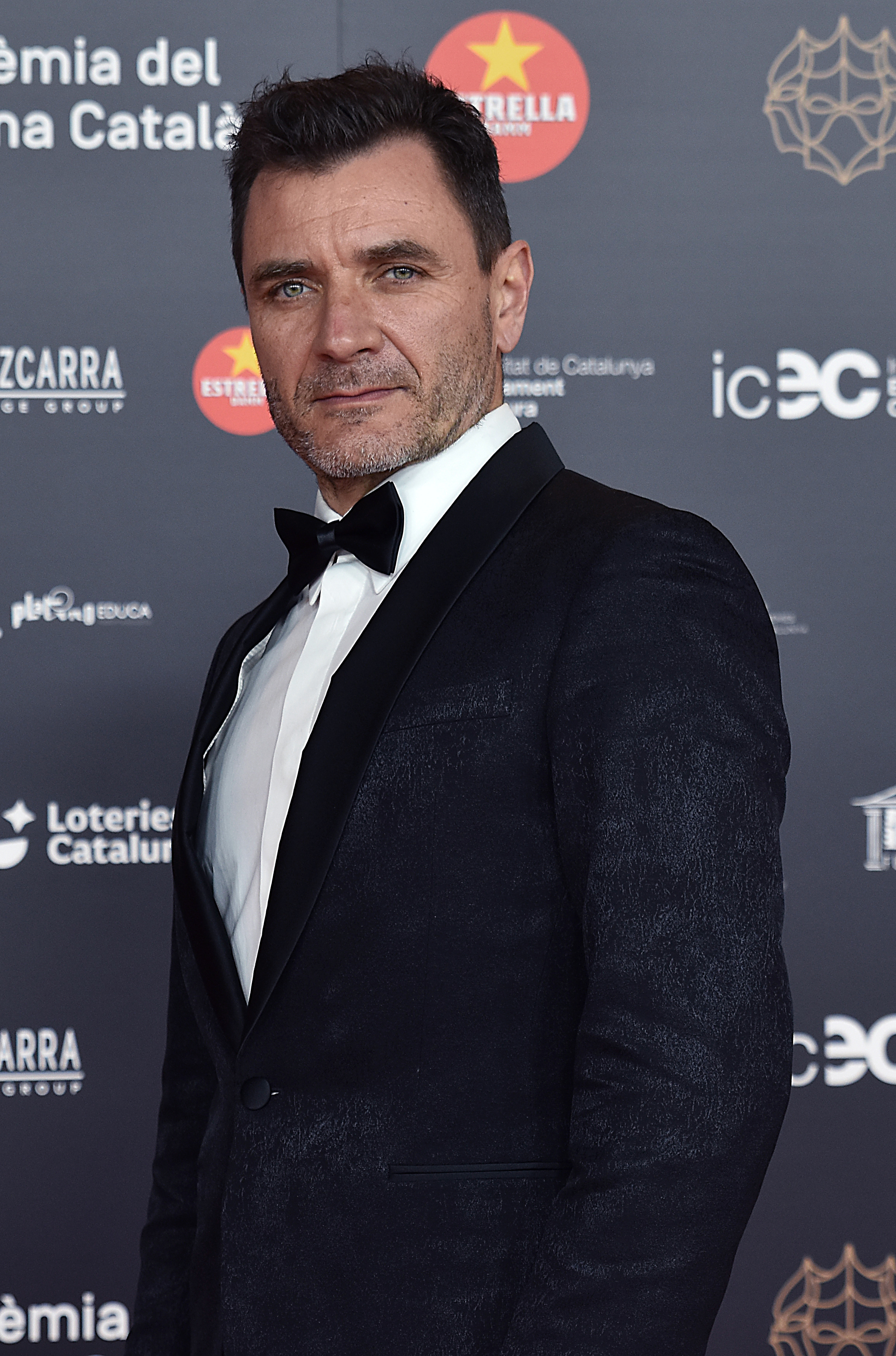
Alex Brendemühl plays Doctor León Pardo/ Noel. Digging deep, Alma and Salvador determine that Leon is “Noel” (his name backwards), acting in both the roles of doctor and patient and embracing his bisexuality.

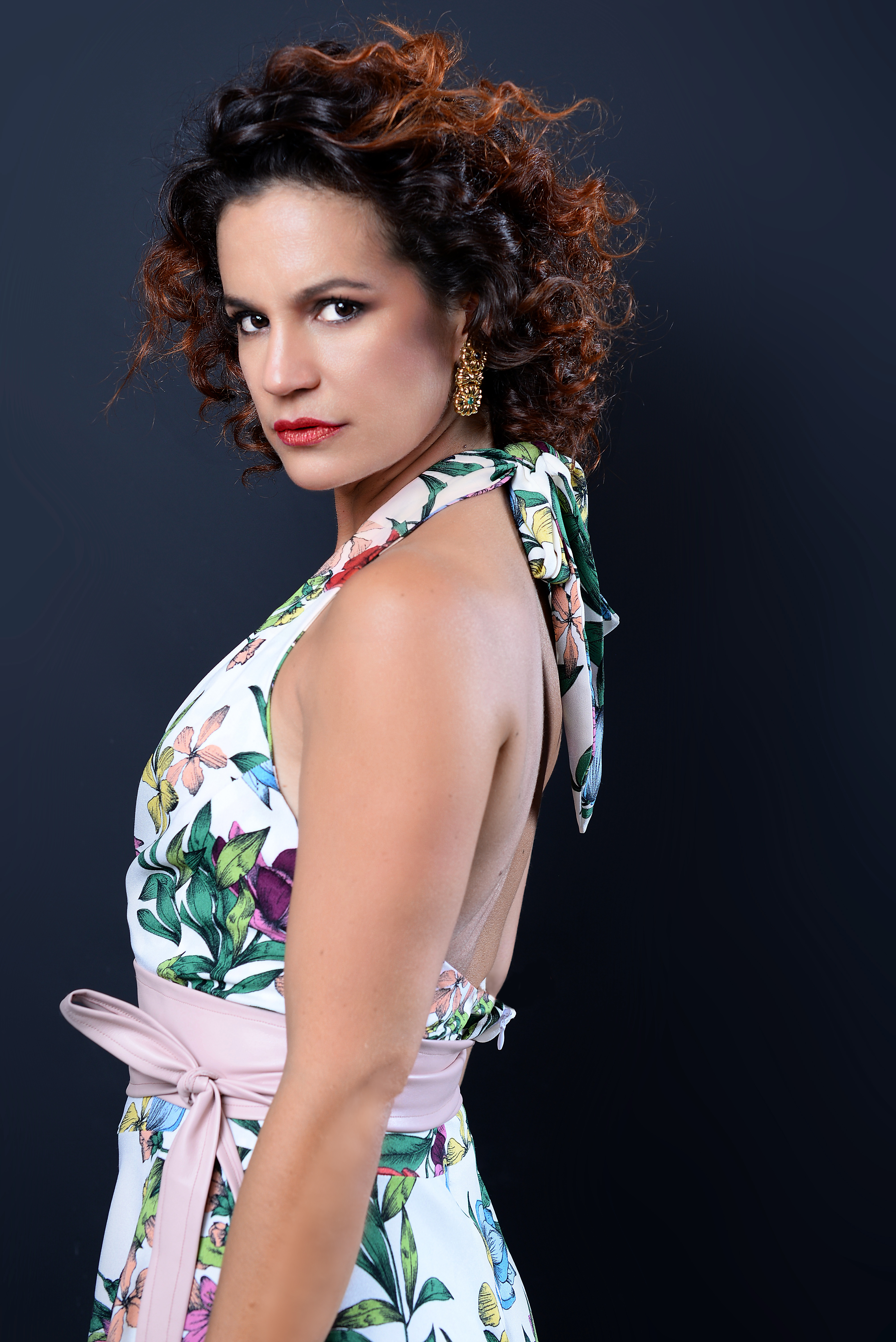
Marieta Orozco plays Violeta, an illiterate deafmute prostitute unable to communicate any information on his whereabouts in the brothel where Leon has taken refuge.

In 1913 Barcelona, Alma Mira, nine-months pregnant, is abandoned without explanation by her eminent psychiatrist husband, Dr. Leon Pardo, after his return from study with Dr. Freud in Vienna, which left him distraught. The witty and beautiful Alma enlists the help of her sister's husband, the dispassionate, repressed psychiatrist, Dr. Salvador Pitfarré, to help her solve the mystery of Leon's fugue state. Secretly in love with Alma and ignoring his better judgment, Salvador agrees to help her, though it will cause trouble for him with his prim, frigid wife, Olivia, Alma's sister. Olivia's sibling rivalry extends to declaring Alma lucky because Leon's penis size is not as large as Salvador's, which Olivia finds distasteful. Olivia deems Alma their father’s favorite, though Alma's hysterical symptoms in her father's presence include hiccups and paralysis.

For clues to the mystery, Alma and Salvador consult Leon's thesis, The Hysterical Woman: Four Cases, based on Freudian theories applied to four patients: Tórtula, Pastora, Señora Ducati, and Noel.

TÓRTULA, star of pornographic films, appealed to Leon to pay off blackmailers and retrieve a locket containing proof of her sexual relationship with King Alfonso XIII. Tórtula introduced Leon to masochism, portrayed in her pornographic films, in which he participated. Leon's desire for humiliation stemmed from his strict father, whom he dubbed "Dr. Frankenstein", who abused him.

PASTORA was committed to the mental hospital by her husband, with the help of Leon, for “being a threat to society,” which Pastora claims common practice by husbands aided by corrupt doctors. A drug addict, Pastora introduced Leon to drugs supplied by her husband. Leon spent all his money on his addiction, going bankrupt.

SEÑORA DUCATI is a woman with "penis envy." Alma and Salvador eventually learn that Señora Ducati is Olivia, who has been leading a secret life. Drugging Salvador every Tuesday, Olivia slipped out with her lesbian lover, "Francis" to attend transvestite costume parties. Swapping clothes to attend one of these parties, Alma and Salvador learn that Olivia introduced Leon to transvestism. Olivia runs off with Francis to live her real life.

NOEL, raised in an orphanage, searches for "her" parentage, finding "her" mother in a brothel. Digging deeper, Alma and Salvador determine that Leon is "Noel" (his name backwards), acting in both the roles of doctor and patient and embracing his bisexuality.

Alma gives birth and tells Salvador, whom she now loves, that she will not accept Leon back should he return. During his investigation at the brothel, Salvador finds Leon, who has learned that his mother had been a maid in the home of Alma's father, Dr. Mira. In his youth, Mira, the son of the household, seduced and impregnated the maid. Leon gave his alcoholic mother, "Señora Mingarro", employment as housekeeper in his and Alma's household. On the day of his fugue, Mira came by their home and was recognized by Señora Mingarro, who announced to Leon that Mira was his father. Thus, Leon learned that he was incestuously married to his half-sister, Alma. To avoid scandal, Mira encouraged Leon to ignore the discovery, attempting to bribe Leon's silence by appointing him successor as Director of the psychiatric hospital, supplanting the faithful Salvador. Spurning the bribe, Leon took off.

Leon now blames Sigmund Freud for all his problems: He is a masochist, an exhibitionist, a drug addict, corrupt, a transvestite, son of a prostitute, and his father’s son-in-law; he impregnated his sister and harbors unrequited love for his best friend—Salvador Pitfarré.

After confessing all this to Salvador, Leon leaves Salvador tied up to a bed at the brothel, setting out to kill Freud at The Circle of Friends of Psychiatry, where Freud will be discussing his work, Totem and Taboo. As Leon points his gun at Freud, Mira blocks his aim; Leon says he will not hesitate to shoot him too, since according to Freud, we all want to kill our fathers. Salvador arrives and tackles Leon as he shoots Mira. A spectator's shot misdirects and strikes the chandelier. As the chandelier falls, Mira embraces Leon, intentionally holding him under the chandelier. Both are killed.

Alma, Salvador, and her baby son sail off to Argentina, where a new life awaits them in a new world.

== Cast ==
- Leonor Watling as Alma
- Luis Tosar as Salvador
- Juanjo Puigcorbé as Doctor Mira
- Núria Prims as Olivia
- Mercedes Sampietro as Señora Mingarro
- Alex Brendemühl as Doctor León Pardo
- Ana Rayo as Tórtola
- Marieta Orozco as Violeta

== Production ==
A joint Spanish/Italian/German/Portuguese co-production, the film was produced by Tornasol Films and Messidor Films in co-production with EMC Asset Management, Madragoa Produção de Filmes and Classic, with the participation of TVE, Canal+, Eurimages, Televisió de Catalunya, ICEC and ICAA. Gerardo Herrero is credited as producer whereas Mariela Besuievski and Marta Esteban are credited as executive producers. The screenplay was penned by Oristrell alongside Teresa de Pelegrí and Dominic Harari.

== Release ==
Distributed by Alta Classics, the film was theatrically released in Spain on 27 August 2004.

The film was released on DVD in the United States under the title Unconscious.

== Accolades ==
Year	Award	Category	Nominee(s)	Result	Ref.
2005	19th Goya Awards	Best Original Screenplay	Joaquín Oristrell, Teresa de Pelegrín, Dominic Harari	Nominated	
2005	19th Goya Awards	Best Supporting Actress	Mercedes Sampietro	Nominated	
2005	19th Goya Awards	Best Original Score	Sergio Moure	Nominated	
2005	19th Goya Awards	Best Costume Design	Sabine Daigeler	Nominated	
2005	19th Goya Awards	Best Makeup and Hairstyles	Karmele Soler, Paco Rodríguez	Nominated	

Year	Award	Category	Nominee(s)	Result	Ref.
2005	Sundance Film Festival	Nominee for Grand Jury Prize - World Cinema Dramatic	Joaquín Oristrell	Nominated	

Year	Award	Category	Nominee(s)	Result	Ref.
2005	Monte Carlo Comedy Film Festival	Nominee for Jury Prize - Best Film	Joaquín Oristrell	Nominated	

== See also ==
- List of Spanish films of 2004
- List of Italian films of 2004
- List of Portuguese films of 2004
