= The Chalk Line =

2022 Spanish psychological thriller film

- Theatrical release poster
- Spanish: Jaula
- Directed by: Ignacio Tatay
- Written by: Isabel Peña; Ignacio Tatay
- Produced by: Ignacio Salazar-Simpson; Ricardo Marco Budé; Carolina Bang; Álex de la Iglesia
- Starring: Elena Anaya; Pablo Molinero; Eva Tennear; Eva Llorach; Carlos Santos; Esther Acebo; Eloy Azorín
- Cinematography: Oriol Barcelona
- Music by: Snorri Hallgrímsson
- Production company: Pokeepsie Films
- Distributed by: Sony Pictures Entertainment Iberia
- Release date: 9 September 2022
- Running time: 106 minutes
- Country: Spain
- Language: Spanish
- Box office: €152,266

The Chalk Line (Spanish: Jaula; transl. 'Cage') (Note: Also known under the working title La casa de tiza) is a 2022 Spanish mystery psychological thriller film directed by Ignacio Tatay (in his feature debut) and co-written by Isabel Peña. It stars Elena Anaya.

== Plot ==
Paula and her husband, Simón, live in an area of upper-class villas. While returning home one night, they notice a mute young girl wandering alone in the middle of the road and take her to the hospital. The hospital cannot locate any of the girl's family, with the only clue being the fact that she responds to the name Clara. Paula soon develops a bond with Clara, and thinking a home environment may improve her condition, her doctor Gloria suggests Paula and Simón temporarily foster her. Clara begins to settle down as Paula and Simón draw chalk lines throughout their house for Clara to move within. During a visit, Gloria tries to get Clara to go outside, threatening to erase one of the chalk lines if she does not. This causes Clara to become upset and yell "buma". Gloria attempts to coax Clara into talking, but she only utters a few words.

The next day, Paula invites her friend Claudia over for breakfast, as part of a playdate between her daughter and Clara. Claudia accidentally eats a shard of glass and is rushed to hospital. Simón suspects Clara placed the shard intentionally, but Paula dismisses him, and the two agree to not tell Gloria. Paula notices that Clara speaks the German word for chalk, Kreide. Thinking she could be from Germany, Paula confirms Clara can understand German but still remains mute. On her next visit, Gloria tells Paula and Simón she knows about the incident and arranges for Clara to return to the hospital. Paula confronts Claudia and slowly becomes more withdrawn from her friends. As Paula tries to find the meaning of the word "buma", she realises it is in fact Buhmann, German for bogeyman. At the same time, she begins choking on a shard of glass. Before rushing to the bathroom, she draws a line in front of Clara. When she returns, Clara has disappeared. Despite the front door being left open, Paula denies she could have left on her own, as she has never been seen crossing the chalk lines. Simón and friends decide to hold an intervention, but Paula, despondent at losing the girl, tells them to leave. Simón then confronts Paula about secretly taking fertility injections, accusing her of obsessing over Clara, and showing her hidden glass shards.

Paula, now alone, receives a phone call from Clara. Distressed, she phones the police, who report that the call was made from Paula's cellphone and ask she take a psychological examination. Still believing Clara to be alive, Paula steals a collection of files from an officer's desk and finds a case strikingly similar to Clara's: a 17-year-old Swiss girl named Ingrid found dead in France, suffering from malnutrition, with a paper angel placed next to her. Paula returns home and notices a drawing Clara had made of her neighbour and friend, Eduardo, from inside their house. Believing Eduardo has kidnapped Clara, she calls the police and wanders over to his house.

In a flashback, Eduardo is seen carrying Clara onto the road, telling her to follow the centre line, not to talk, and to walk towards a police checkpoint ahead. During a dinner party at Paula and Simón's, Eduardo is shown putting a shard of glass in the jam. Later, he attempts to abduct Clara but is foiled as Simón returns home, managing to steal Paula's cellphone.

Eduardo stabs Paula and drags her down to his basement. Paula realises Eduardo kidnapped Ingrid when she was 12 and imprisoned her in the basement, where she gave birth to Clara. Eduardo forces Paula to reveal how she knew. She tells him about the police files, and while Eduardo tries to find them, she throws Clara a piece of chalk so she can hide. When Eduardo returns, Paula distracts him long enough for Clara to escape and find help. As Clara tentatively makes her way outside, she tries to call to Simón but is abducted yet again by Eduardo's wife, Maite. The next morning, Eduardo's house is raided by police. Clara and Paula are shown having a video call: Clara has been reunited with her grandmother, and Paula, now pregnant, have moved to the city with Simón.

== Cast ==
- Elena Anaya as Paula
- Pablo Molinero as Simón
- Carlos Santos as Eduardo
- Eva Llorach as Maite
- Esther Acebo as Claudia
- Eloy Azorín as Beltrán
- Eva Tennear as Clara
- Mona Martínez as Arana
- Sonia Almarcha as Gloria

== Production ==
Isabel Peña collaborated in writing the story. The project, a Pokeepsie Films production, was halted due to the onset of the COVID-19 pandemic in Spain. Filming resumed in July 2020, with Oriol Barcelona on cinematography duties. The film was shot at a number of locations in the Madrid region, including Madrid, San Lorenzo de El Escorial, Boadilla del Monte, as well as a set in Villaviciosa de Odón.

== Release ==
Distributed by Sony Pictures Entertainment Iberia, the film was theatrically released in Spain on 9 September 2022 and came out on Netflix on 24 October 2022.

== Reception ==
=== Box office ===
The Chalk Line grossed €152,266 in Spain.

=== Critical response ===
The review aggregator website Rotten Tomatoes reported a 67% approval rating, with an average score of 6.4/10, based on 9 reviews.

Raquel Hernández Luján of HobbyConsolas gave the film 78 points ("good"), deeming it to be "candy for thriller lovers", with "good performances and production values", endorsing a "memorable debut". Miguel Ángel Romero of Cinemanía rated the film 3 out of 5 stars, writing that Tatay makes a masterful debut, "a horror-tinged thriller whose strength lies in the acting quality of its protagonists". Jordi Batlle Caminal of Fotogramas rated Jaula 3 out of 5 stars, deeming the debut feature to be a "model exercise in genre cinema, well-made and without authorial pretensions", featuring a "spectacular" plot twist at the height of the hour mark. Marshall Shaffer of Decider.com considered that despite being a "promising feature debut" for Tatay, the film "never quite coheres as it should", failing to "fulfill all its ambitions or breakthrough beyond its (admittedly impressively crafted) atmosphere".

== See also ==
- List of Spanish films of 2022
