= Núria Prims =

Spanish actress

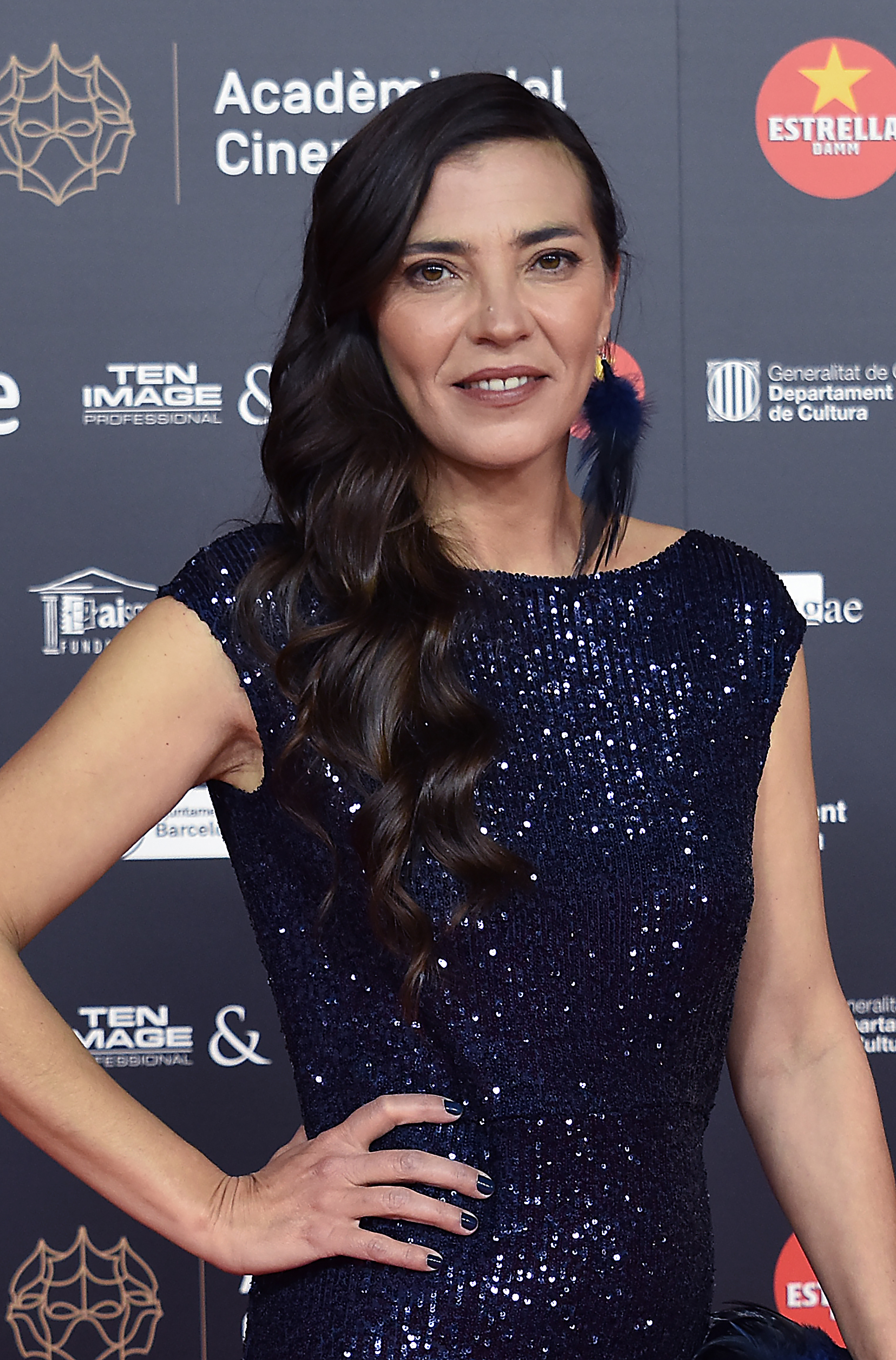
- Attending the 13th Gaudí Awards in 2021
- Born: 29 September 1972 (age 52); Barcelona, Spain
- Other names: Nuria Prims
- Occupation: Actress

Núria Prims (born 29 September 1972) is a Spanish theatre, television and film actress from Catalonia.

== Biography ==
Núria Prims was born in Barcelona on 29 September 1972. She was raised in Sant Andreu. She made her feature film debut by landing a role in the 1995 drama Stories from the Kronen. Film appearances in El domini dels sentits, Un cos al bosc, Saïd, Sobreviviré, Unconscious and Trash ensued.

She became popular to a television audience in Catalonia owing to her performance as Mariona Montsolís in soap opera Nissaga de poder, whereas she earned a wider visibility in Spain in the wake of her performance playing Dr. Leyre Durán in Hospital Central. She retired from cinema towards 2009, and moved to Menorca, returning to cinema 8 years later upon a personal request from Agustí Villaronga to star as Carlana (the widow of a local cacique) in Uncertain Glory. Her performance earned her several accolades. Among other credits, she has since featured in the period thriller The Barcelona Vampiress and the crime television series Hache.

== Accolades ==
Year	Award	Category	Work	Result	Ref.
2010	2nd Gaudí Awards	Best Supporting Actress	Trash	Nominated	
2018	10th Gaudí Awards	Best Actress	Uncertain Glory	Won	
2018	5th Feroz Awards	Best Actress (film)	Uncertain Glory	Nominated	
2018	62nd Sant Jordi Awards	Best Actress in a Spanish Film	Uncertain Glory	Won	
2021	13th Gaudí Awards	Best Supporting Actress	The Barcelona Vampiress	Nominated	
