= The Invisible (2020 film) =

- Theatrical release poster
- Spanish: Invisibles
- Directed by: Gracia Querejeta
- Written by: Gracia Querejeta; Antonio Mercero
- Starring: Emma Suárez; Adriana Ozores; Nathalie Poza
- Cinematography: Juan Carlos Gómez
- Edited by: Leire Alonso
- Music by: Federico Jusid
- Production companies: Nephilim Producciones; Orange Films AIE
- Distributed by: Wanda Films
- Release date: 6 March 2020
- Country: Spain
- Language: Spanish

The Invisible (Spanish: Invisibles) is a 2020 Spanish drama film directed and co-written by Gracia Querejeta, and starring Emma Suárez, Adriana Ozores and Nathalie Poza.

== Plot ==
Set in a public park, the plot concerns the conversations established between three women close to their 50s (Elsa, Julia and Amelia) on their weekly walks around the site.

== Cast ==
- Emma Suárez as Elsa
- Adriana Ozores as Julia
- Nathalie Poza as Amelia
- Blanca Portillo
- Fernando Cayo
- Pedro Casablanc

== Production ==
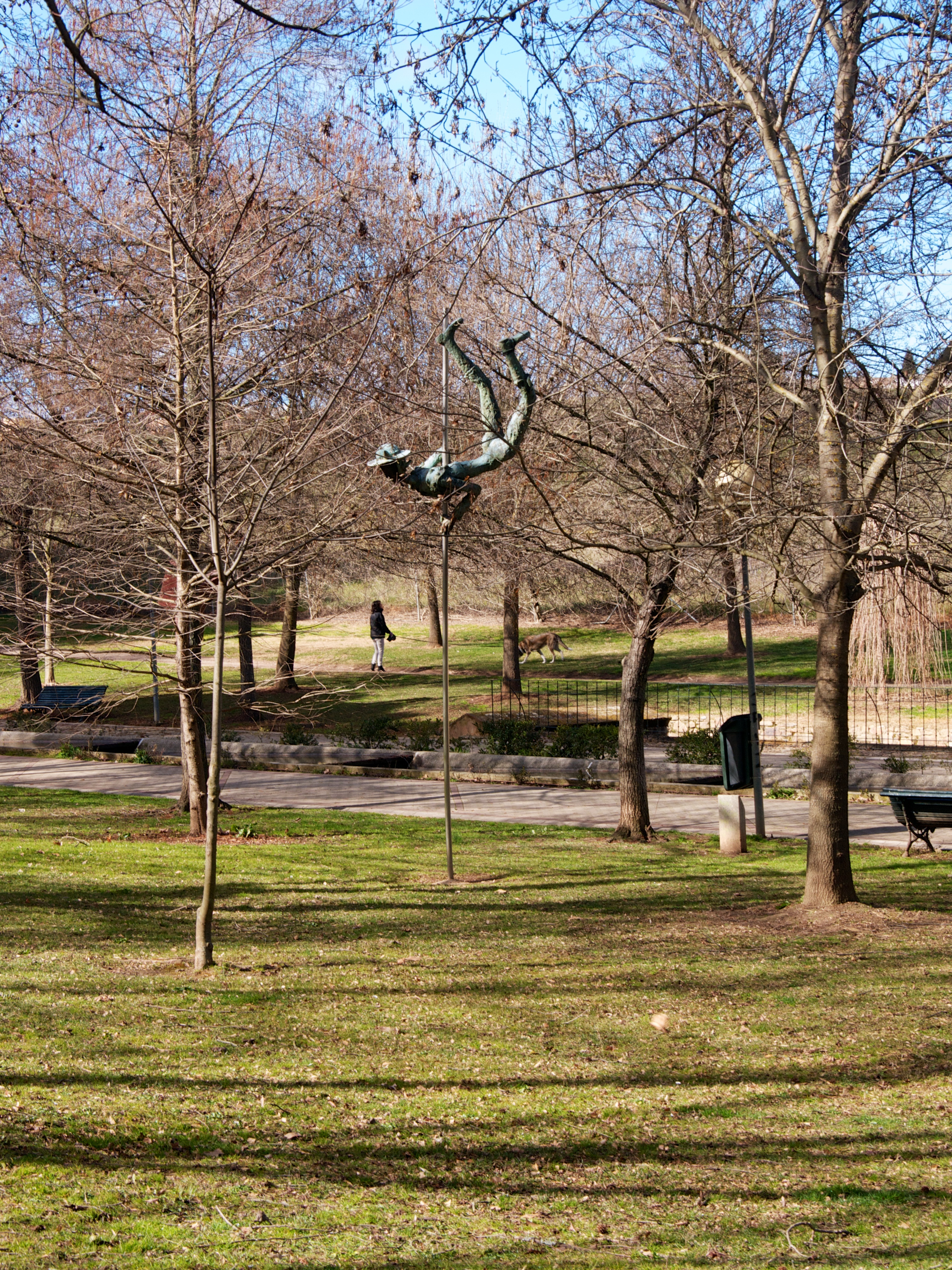
The film was primarily shot on location in the Parque del Príncipe, a public park of Cáceres.

The screenplay was penned by Gracia Querejeta alongside Antonio Santos Mercero. Invisibles was produced by Nephilim Producciones SL and Orange Films AIE with the participation of RTVE, RTVM and Movistar+, endorsement from Canal Extremadura and support from ICAA and Junta de Extremadura. The film was primarily shot on location in the Parque del Príncipe in Cáceres (with some footage shot in a nearby street and high school) from March to April 2019, only using a steadycam.

== Release ==
Distributed by Wanda Films, Invisibles was theatrically released in Spain on 6 March 2020 grossing a "good" €136,761 in its opening weekend standing out from a domestic box office otherwise depressed due to the growth of COVID-19 cases, but its theatrical run was soon halted by the State of Alarm declared by the Government due to the pandemic, which closed theatres down.

== Accolades ==
Year	Award	Category	Nominee(s)	Result	Ref.
2021	76th CEC Medals	Best Director	Gracia Querejeta	Nominated	
2021	76th CEC Medals	Best Actress	Emma Suárez	Nominated	
2021	76th CEC Medals	Best Actress	Adriana Ozores	Nominated	
2021	76th CEC Medals	Best Supporting Actor	Pedro Casablanc	Nominated	
2021	76th CEC Medals	Best Original Screenplay	Antonio Mercero, Gracia Querejeta	Nominated	

== See also ==
- List of Spanish films of 2020
