= La dona il·legal =

2020 film by Ramon Térmens

- Directed by: Ramon Térmens
- Screenplay by: Daniel Faraldo; Ramon Térmens
- Produced by: Ramon Térmens
- Starring: Daniel Faraldo; Yolanda Sey; Isak Férriz
- Cinematography: Pol Orpinell
- Edited by: Anna Térmens; Sergi Maixenchs
- Music by: David Solar
- Production companies: Segarra Films; Mimesis Film
- Release date: 11 December 2020
- Countries: Spain; Czech Republic
- Languages: Spanish; Catalan

La dona il·legal (English: Illegal Woman) its a 2020 Spanish–Czech social thriller film directed by ramon Térmens and written by Térmens and Daniel Faraldo. Starring Daniel Faraldo, Yolanda Sey and Isak Férriz, it follows an immigration lawyer investigating the death of a detainee inside a Spanish immigration detention centre, and addresses the issues of immigration detention and institutional racism. The film was released theatrically on 11 December 2020 and was later released on Netflix on 11 May 2021.

== Plot ==
Fernando Vila iss an immigration lawyer who takes what seems to be a straightforward case: preventing the deportation of a young Kosovar woman, Zita Krasniqi. Everything changes when she is found dead in an immigration detention centre and the authorities declare it a suicide. Fernando seeks help from the victim's only friend, Juliet Okoro, a Nigerian immigrant trapped in a prostitution rings.. As he tries to uncover what happened, he encounters the fierce opposition of police chief Oriol Cadenas and begins to expose corruption, sexual abuse and staged suicides within the Spanish deportation system.

== Cast ==
The cast includes:

- Daniel Faraldo as Fernando Vila
- Yolanda Sey as Juliet Okoro
- Isak Férriz as Oriol Cadenas
- Montse Germán as Rosa Puiggròs
- Raquel Camón as Fàtima Jamed
- Adeline Flaun as Mercy Okafor
- Boris Ruiz as Enric Millar
- Gorka Lasaosa as Jordi Puigmartí
- Àngels Bassas as Carla
- Klaudia Dudová as Zita Krasniqi
- Abdel Aziz El Mountassir as Hussein
- Ahmad Alhamsho as Samir
- Godeliv Van den Brandt as Helen

== Production ==
Térmens said that the idea for the film came after he met an immigration lawyer who told him about disturbing cases he had encountered in his work. He then contacted Daniel Faraldo, who both played the lead role and co-wrote the screenplay. Filming took place mainly in Lleida and at La Model in Barcelona, which was used as a stand-in for an immigration detention centre.

== Release ==
The film was released in cinemas on 11 December 2020. Netflix later acquired streaming rights and released it on the platform on 11 May 2021. It was also screened at the 11th Som Cinema festival and at the 13th edition of FIC-CAT, the International Festival of Cinema in Catalan.

== Accolades ==
- At the 11th Som Cinema festival, the film won the award for Best Fiction Feature Film.
- At the 13th FIC-CAT, it won the Audience Award.
- At the 13th Gaudí Awards, the film was nominated for Best Film, and Abdel Aziz El Mountassir was nominated for Best Supporting Actor.
