= One for All (2020 film) =

- Theatrical release poster
- Spanish: Uno para todos
- Directed by: David Ilundain
- Screenplay by: Coral Cruz; Valentina Viso
- Starring: David Verdaguer; Patricia López Arnaiz; Ana Labordeta; Clara Segura; Néstor Romero; Vega Vallés
- Cinematography: Bet Rourich
- Edited by: Elena Ruiz; Ana Charter
- Music by: Zeltia Montes
- Production companies: Inicia Films; Fasten Films; A Contracorriente Films; Bolo Audiovisual; Uno para todos AIE; Amalur AIE
- Distributed by: A Contracorriente Films
- Release dates: March 2020 (Miami); 18 September 2020 (Spain)
- Country: Spain
- Language: Spanish

One for All (Spanish: Uno para todos) is a 2020 Spanish drama film directed by David Ilundain which stars David Verdaguer alongside Patricia López Arnaiz, Ana Labordeta, and Clara Segura.

== Plot ==
The plot follows Aleix, a Catalan interim school teacher doing a substitution in an Aragonese village. He has to deal with the bullying exercised by his new class on one of the students (Carlos) who was sick upon Aleix's arrival and nobody wants him back.

== Cast ==
- David Verdaguer as Aleix
- Patricia López Arnaiz as Ana
- Ana Labordeta as Carmen
- Clara Segura as Clara
- Betsy Túrnez as Marta
- Néstor Romero as Carlos
- Vega Vallés as Selua

== Production ==
The screenplay was penned by Valentina Viso and Coral Cruz. The film is an Inicia Films, Fasten Films, A Contracorriente Films, Bolo Audiovisual, Uno para todos AIE and Amalur AIE production. It had participation of TVE, TVC, Movistar+, Rakuten Cinema, and Aragón TV. Shooting began on 1 July 2019. Shooting locations included Arenys de Munt (Catalonia) and Caspe (Aragon).

== Release ==
The film had its world premiere at the Miami Film Festival in March 2020 rather than the intended Málaga Film Festival premiere, owing to the cancellation (eventually postponement) of the latter in the wake of the COVID-19 pandemic. It also screened as the opening film in the 4th BCN Film Fest. Distributed by A Contracorriente Films, it was theatrically released in Spain on 18 September 2020.

== Reception ==
Andrea G. Bermejo of Cinemanía rated the film 4 out 5 stars, deeming it to be a "magnificent film" for several reasons, including "a great script that vindicates the power of education"

Alberto Bermejo of El Mundo also scored 4 out of 5 stars praising "the originality of the writing and the sense of authenticity given off by the images and the behavior of the protagonists".

Jordi Batlle Caminal of Fotogramas rated it 3 out of 5 stars, highlighting Verdaguer's "credible and close" performance while citing the accumulation of clichés from the educational film genre as a negative point.

== Accolades ==
Year	Award	Category	Nominee(s)	Result	Ref.
2021	26th Forqué Awards	Best Actor	David Verdaguer	Nominated	
2021	26th Forqué Awards	Cinema and Education in Values		Won	
2021	8th Feroz Awards	Best Actor	David Verdaguer	Nominated	
2021	35th Goya Awards	Best Actor	David Verdaguer	Nominated	
2021	13th Gaudí Awards	Best Actor	David Verdaguer	Nominated	
2021	13th Gaudí Awards	Best Cinematography	Bet Rourich	Nominated	

== See also ==
- List of Spanish films of 2020
