= I Love You, Stupid =

2020 Spanish romantic comedy drama film directed by Laura Mañá

- Film poster
- Spanish: Te quiero, imbécil
- Directed by: Laura Mañá
- Written by: Abraham Sastre; Iván José Bouso
- Produced by: Francesc Escribano; Raimon Masllorens; Tono Folguera
- Starring: Quim Gutiérrez; Natalia Tena; Alfonso Bassave; Alba Ribas; Ernesto Alterio
- Music by: Javier Bayon
- Production companies: Brutal Media; Minoria Absoluta; Lastor Media; Yo hombre la película AIE
- Distributed by: Filmax
- Release date: 24 January 2020 (Spain)
- Running time: 93 minutes
- Country: Spain
- Language: Spanish

I Love You, Stupid (Spanish: Te quiero, imbécil) is a 2020 Spanish romantic comedy film written and directed by Laura Mañá. The film stars Quim Gutiérrez, Natalia Tena and Alfonso Bassave in the lead roles.

== Plot ==
Marcos (Quim Gutiérrez), a young man faces series of nightmares after having a breakup with his longtime girlfriend Ana (Alba Ribas) ending an eight year old romantic relationship between the duo. Marcos loses his job on the day after his breakup with Ana and he desperately sets out to reinvent himself and has to revisit the basics of being a modern man with the help of his childhood friend and an Argentinian YouTube guru.

== Cast ==
- Quim Gutiérrez as Marcos
- Natalia Tena as Raquel
- Alfonso Bassave as Diego
- Alba Ribas as Ana
- Patricia Vico as Lorena
- Ernesto Alterio as Sebastián Vennet

== Production ==
The film was produced by Brutal Media, Minoria Absoluta, Lastor Media and Yo hombre la película AIE, with the participation of ICEC, RTVE, TV3 and Netflix.

== Release ==
Distributed by Filmax, the film was theatrically released in Spain on 24 January 2020. It was also streamed via Netflix on 15 May 2020.

== Reception ==
The film received mixed reviews from critics. On the review aggregator website Rotten Tomatoes, 63% of 8 critics' reviews are positive, with an average rating of 5.5/10.

== Awards and nominations ==
Year	Award	Category	Nominee(s)	Result	Ref.
2021	13th Gaudí Awards	Best Supporting Actor	Ernesto Alterio	Nominated	

== See also ==
- List of Spanish films of 2020
