= The Summer We Lived =

- Theatrical release poster
- Spanish: El verano que vivimos
- Directed by: Carlos Sedes
- Screenplay by: Ramón Campos; Gema R. Neira; David Orea; Salvador S. Molina; Javier Chacártegui
- Produced by: Ramón Campos; Teresa Fernández-Valdés; Mercedes Gamero; Olmo Figueredo González-Quevedo; Jordi Gasull
- Starring: Blanca Suárez; Javier Rey; Pablo Molinero; Carlos Cuevas; Guiomar Puerta; María Pedraza; Alfonso Agra; Adelfa Calvo; Antonio Durán "Morris"; Manuel Morón; Mercedes Sampietro
- Cinematography: Jacobo Martínez
- Edited by: Julia Juanatey
- Music by: Federico Jusid
- Production companies: Mr. Fields and Friends; Atresmedia Cine; Warner Bros. Entertainment España; Bambú Producciones; Aquel Verano Movie AIE; La Claqueta PC; 4Cats Pictures
- Distributed by: Warner Bros. Pictures
- Release dates: 20 September 2020 (Zinemaldia); 4 December 2020 (Spain)
- Country: Spain
- Language: Spanish

The Summer We Lived (Spanish: El verano que vivimos) is a 2020 romantic melodrama film directed by Carlos Sedes which stars Javier Rey, Blanca Suárez, and Pablo Molinero in a love triangle.

== Plot ==
The plot delves into a love triangle that took place in the summer of 1958 in Jerez de la Frontera, concerning an architect who arrived in town to build a winery (Gonzalo), the one ordering the winery (Hernán) and the latter's fiancée (Lucía). A different timeline set in 1998 deals with the reconstruction of the aforementioned love story upon the investigations carried out by a journalist trainee working with obituaries (Isabel) who enlists the collaboration of Carlos, the architect's son.

== Cast ==
- Javier Rey as Gonzalo
- Blanca Suárez as Lucía
- Pablo Molinero as Hernán
- Guiomar Puerta as Isabel
- Carlos Cuevas as Carlos
- Adelfa Calvo
- Manuel Morón
- María Pedraza as Adela
- Moreno Borja
- Mercedes Sampietro
- Joaquín Núñez
- Pedro Rudolphi
- Paloma Reynaud
- Antonio Durán
- Alfonso Agra

== Production ==
The screenplay was penned by Ramón Campos, Gema R. Neira, Salvador S. Molina, Javier Chacártegui and David Orea. The film is an Aquel Verano Movie AIE, Warner Bros Entertainment España, Atresmedia Cine, Mr. Fields and Friends, La Claqueta PC, Bambú Producciones and 4 Cats Pictures production. Shooting began on 5 August 2019 in Jerez de la Frontera. Shooting locations also included Galicia.

== Release ==
The film was presented at the 68th San Sebastián International Film Festival on 20 September 2020. Distributed by Warner Bros. Pictures España, it was initially intended to be theatrically released in Spain on 6 November 2020 but it was postponed to 4 December 2020 due to the COVID-19 pandemic.

== Reception ==
Elsa Fernández-Santos of El País wrote that the film "confuses eroticism and passion with a grandiloquent epic akin to a tourist postcard, redundant music, aerial shots, and a string of metaphors", with the film resenting from, among other issues, a screenplay "without much narrative foundation" and otherwise also turning out to be "implausible and whimsical".

Mireia Mullor of Fotogramas rated the film 3 out of 5 stars highlighting the landscapes of Jerez de la Frontera vis-à-vis the film's setting as the best thing about the film.

Andrea G. Bermejo of Cinemanía rated the film 3 out of 5 stars, determining as a verdict that the film is "a formulaic [kind of] cinema... which, for that reason, [it] works".

== Accolades ==
Year	Award	Category	Nominee(s)	Result	Ref.
2021	35th Goya Awards	Best Original Score	Federico Jusid	Nominated	
2021	35th Goya Awards	Best Original Song	"El verano que vivimos" by Alejandro Sanz, Alfonso Pérez Arias	Nominated	

== See also ==
- List of Spanish films of 2020
