= Les dues nits d'ahir =

2020 Catalan-language road drama

- Directed by: Pau Cruanyes; Gerard Vidal
- Written by: Eudald Valdivieso; Ignasi Àvila; Pau Cruanyes; Gerard Vidal
- Starring: Arnau Comas; Oriol Llobet; Judit Cortina; Mar Pawlowsky; Cristina Colom; Kharlos Villanueva
- Cinematography: Ignasi Àvila
- Edited by: Carlos Murcia
- Production company: Benecé Produccions
- Release dates: 21 August 2020 (Málaga Film Festival); 27 November 2020 (Catalonia)
- Running time: 85 minutes
- Country: Spain
- Language: Catalan

Les dues nits d'ahir (Yesterday's Two Nights) is a 2020 Catalan-language Spanish road drama film directed by Pau Cruanyes and Gerard Vidal, and written by Eudald Valdivieso, Ignasi Àvila, Cruanyes, and Vidal. Developed from a final degree project at Pompeu Fabra University, it had its festival premiere in the Zonazine section of the Málaga Film Festival on 21 August 2020 and was commercially released in Catalonia on 27 November 2020. The film won the Silver Biznaga for Best Director and the Silver Biznaga for Best Actor for Arnau Comas and Oriol Llobet at Málaga, and later received a nomination for the Gaudí Award for Best Film as well as the Audience Special Award at the 13th Gaudí Awards.

== Plot ==
One summer night, Eric steals the ashes of his recently deceased friend Pol. That same night, he and his two closest friends, Ona and Marcel, set out on a car journey to scatter them. The trip gradually becomes a bubble that cuts them off from reality, taking them further and further from home and from their original purpose. As the journey continues, the three must confront a loss they cannot fully understand.

== Cast ==
- Arnau Comas
- Oriol Llobet
- Judit Cortina
- Mar Pawlowsky
- Cristina Colom
- Kharlos Villanueva

== Production ==
The film originated as an audiovisual communication final degree project by Cruanyes, Vidal, Valdivieso and Àvila at Pompeu Fabra University. It was produced by Benecé Produccions, with the participation of Televisió de Catalunya. Cinematography was by Ignasi Àvila and editing by Carlos Murcia. Additional crew included Ginebra Abril (sound), Elisabet Gomà Senpau (art direction), Jasmina Díaz (costume design), Zak Ramis (assistant director), Celia Giraldo (script supervisor), Adrià Mateos (production assistant), Laia Rosinès and Adrià Velasco (photography department), and Laura Gil Amat (still photography and graphic design). It was filmed between 2018 and 2019 in beach locations around Catalonia, and was financially supported via crowdfunding.

== Release ==
Before completion, the project was selected for the Glocal in Progress section of the 67th San Sebastián International Film Festival in 2019, where it was presented under the international title Yesterday's Two Nights. The completed film premiered in the Zonazine section of the 23rd Málaga Film Festival in August 2020.

In 2021, it was placed for two of the Gaudí Awards, nominated for best film, and winning the Audience Special Award. The Spanish newspaper El País, in the run-up to the awards ceremony, described the film as "different, groundbreaking, almost documentary-like, and audacious."

== Awards and nominations ==
Award	Year	Category	Result
REC Tarragona International Film Festival	2018	Eclair Primer Test	Won
San Sebastián International Film Festival	2019	Glocal in Progress	Selected
Málaga Film Festival (Zonazine)	2020	Best Actor	Won
Málaga Film Festival (Zonazine)	2020	Best Director	Won
SomCinema Catalan Audiovisual Festival	2020	Jury Prize for Fiction Feature	Won
Gaudí Awards	2021	Best Film	Nominated
Gaudí Awards	2021	Audience Special Award	Won
