= Patricia López Arnaiz =

Spanish actress (born 1981)

- López Arnaiz in 2026
- Born: Patricia López Arnaiz; 15 April 1981 (age 45); Vitoria-Gasteiz, Spain
- Occupation: Actress
- Years active: 2010–present

Patricia López Arnaiz (born 15 April 1981) is a Spanish actress, best known for her roles in the 2020 drama film Ane Is Missing and the television series A Different View.

== Life and career ==
Born in Vitoria-Gasteiz, López Arnaiz was raised in the neighborhood of El Pilar. She moved to Bilbao to study a degree on Advertising and Public Relations at the University of the Basque Country. She worked as an instructor in an ikastola and as a concert venue producer. She started to gain visibility as an actress in the wake of her work in period television series La peste and A Different View. Her work in Ane Is Missing (2020) earned her the Goya Award for Best Actress, a first timer for a Basque-language performance.

== Filmography ==
=== Film ===
Year	Title	Original title	Role	Notes
2010	For 80 Days	80 egunean	Garazi	
2013	My Mother's Hands	Amaren eskuak		
2013	Wounded	La herida	Sandra	
2014	Lasa and Zabala	Lasa y Zabala	Izaskun	
2015	An Autumn Without Berlin	Un otoño sin Berlín	Presenter	
2017	The Invisible Guardian	El guardián invisible	Rosaura Salazar	
2018	The Tree of Blood	El árbol de la sangre	Amaia	
2018	Happy Sad	Alegría tristeza	Chica Atasco	
2019	While at War	Mientras dure la guerra	María	
2019	The Legacy of the Bones	Legado en los huesos	Rosaura Salazar	
2020	One for All	Uno para todos	Ana	
2020	Offering to the Storm	Ofrenda a la tormenta	Rosaura Salazar	
2020	Ane Is Missing	Ane	Lide	
2020	Death Knell	Hil-Kanpaiak	Fical	
2021	The Daughter	La hija	Adela	
2021	Mediterraneo: The Law of the Sea	Mediterráneo	Laura Lanuza	
2022	Beyond the Summit	La cima	Ione	
2023	20,000 Species of Bees	20.000 especies de abejas	Ane	
2024	Nina	Nina	Nina	
2024	Glimmers	Los destellos	Isabel	
2025	Sundays	Los domingos	Maite	
2025	Singular		Diana	
2026	The Harvester	Sacamantecas	Ángela	

=== Television ===
Key
†	Denotes television productions that have not yet been released

Year	Title	Original title	Role	Notes	Ref.
2010	What a Sad Life	Qué vida más triste		Episode: "Amistades peligrosas"	
2018–2019	A Different View	La otra mirada	Teresa Blanco Sánchez	21 episode	
2018–2019	The Plague	La peste	Teresa Pinelo	12 episodes	
2020	The Invisible Line	La línea invisible	Clara	2 episodes	
2022	Feria: The Darkest Light	Feria: La luz más oscura	Sandra	8 episodes	
2022	Intimacy	Intimidad	Begoña Uribe		
TBD	Un perfecto extraño †				

== Accolades ==
Year	Award	Category	Work	Result	Ref.
2018	20th Iris Awards	Best Actress	A Different View	Nominated	
2021	26th Forqué Awards	Best Actress in a Film	Ane Is Missing	Won	
2021	8th Feroz Awards	Best Main Actress in a Film	Ane Is Missing	Won	
2021	76th CEC Medals	Best Actress	Ane Is Missing	Nominated	
2021	76th CEC Medals	Best Supporting Actress	One for All	Nominated	
2021	35th Goya Awards	Best Actress	Ane Is Missing	Won	
2023	10th Feroz Awards	Best Supporting Actress in a Series	Intimacy	Won	
2024	11th Feroz Awards	Best Supporting Actress in a Film	20,000 Species of Bees	Won	
2024	16th Gaudí Awards	Best Actress	20,000 Species of Bees	Nominated	
2024	38th Goya Awards	Best Actress	20,000 Species of Bees	Nominated	
2024	72nd San Sebastián International Film Festival	Silver Shell for Best Leading Performance	Glimmers	Won	
2024	30th Forqué Awards	Best Actress in a Film	Glimmers	Nominated	
2025	17th Gaudí Awards	Best Actress	Glimmers	Nominated	
2025	12th Feroz Awards	Best Main Actress in a Film	Glimmers	Nominated	
2025	80th CEC Medals	Best Actress	Glimmers	Nominated	
2025	39th Goya Awards	Best Actress	Glimmers	Nominated	
2025	33rd Actors and Actresses Union Awards	Best Film Actress in a Leading Role	Glimmers	Nominated	
2025	31st Forqué Awards	Best Actress in a Film	Sundays	Won	
2026	13th Feroz Awards	Best Main Actress in a Film	Sundays	Won	
2026	81st CEC Medals	Best Actress	Sundays	Won	
2026	40th Goya Awards	Best Actress	Sundays	Won	
2026	34th Actors and Actresses Union Awards	Best Film Actress in a Leading Role	Sundays	Won	
2026	13th Platino Awards	Best Actress	Sundays	Nominated	
