= Pablo Molinero =

Spanish actor (born 1977)

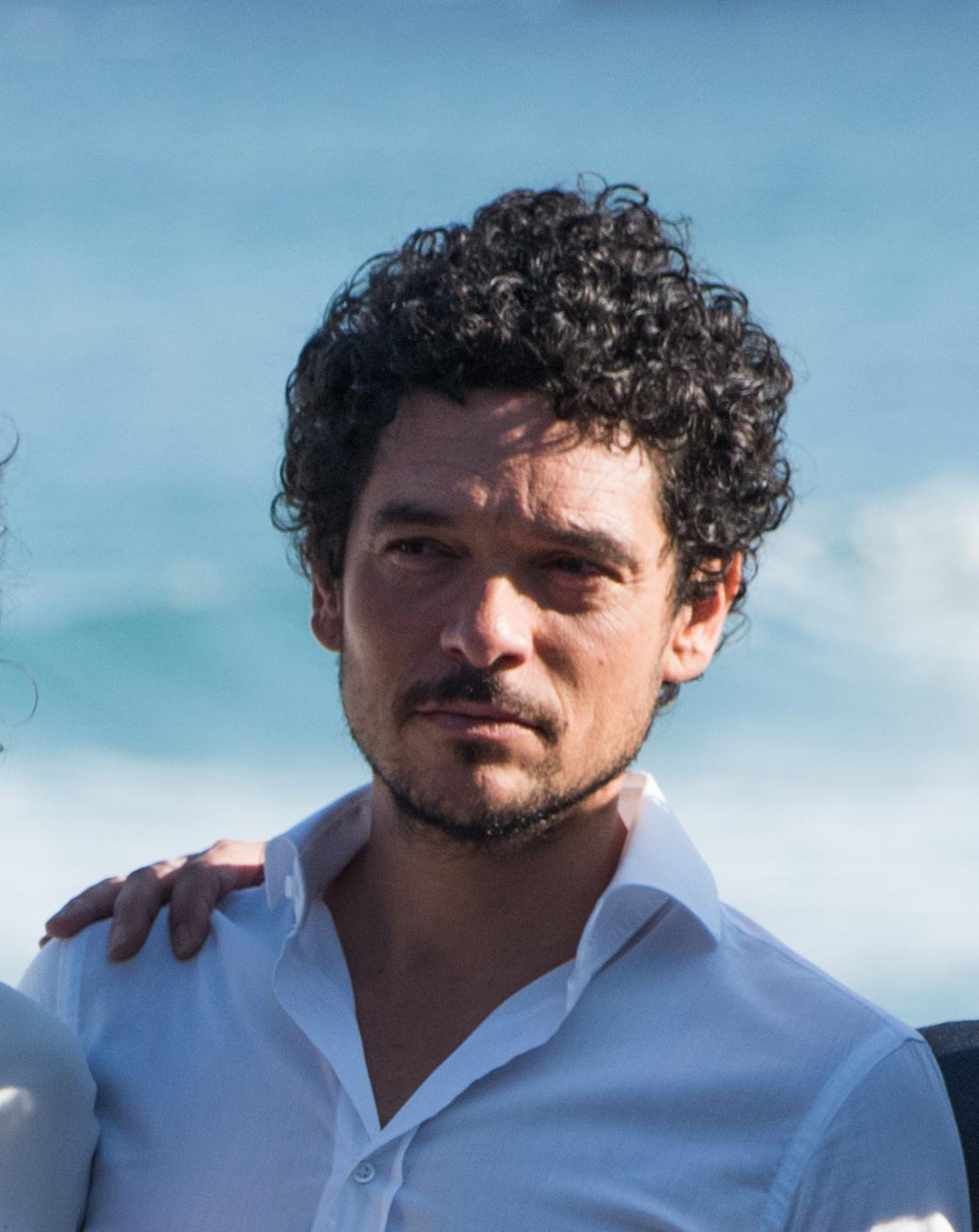
- Born: Pablo Molinero Martínez; 1977 (age 48–49); Castellón de la Plana, Spain
- Occupations: Actor, entrepreneur

Pablo Molinero Martínez (born 1977) is a Spanish actor, best known for his work on the films The Summer We Lived (2020), The Chalk Line (2022), and the television series La peste (2018–2019).

== Life and career ==
Pablo Molinero Martínez was born in 1977 in Castellón de la Plana. He studied English Philology at the Jaume I University, where he became acquainted with the performing arts as an amateur actor.

== Filmography ==
=== Film ===
Year	Title	Role	Notes	Ref.
2020	L'ofrena (The Offering)			
2020	El verano que vivimos (The Summer We Lived)	Hernán		
2022	Jaula (The Chalk Line)	Simón		
2023	Unicorns	Mikel		
2023	Chinas (Chinas, a Second Generation Story)	Julián		
2024	Lo carga el diablo (Devil Dog Road)	Tristán		
2025	Nosotros (The Story of Us)	Antonio		
2025	Pequeños calvarios (Pet Peeves)	Carlo		
2026	Eixam (Swarm)	Lluc		

=== Television ===
Year	Title	Role	Notes	Ref.
2018–19	La peste	Mateo Núñez		
2020	La mort de Guillem	Guillem Agulló-pare	TV movie	
2022	Un asunto privado (A Private Affair)	Arturo		
2023	Tú también lo harías	Fran Garza		
