= My Mexican Bretzel =

2019 documentary film by Nuria Giménez Lorang

- Official poster
- Directed by: Nuria Giménez Lorang
- Written by: Nuria Giménez Lorang
- Starring: Frank A. Lorang; Ilse G. Ringier
- Cinematography: Frank A. Lorang
- Edited by: Cristóbal Fernández; Nuria Giménez Lorang
- Production companies: Bretzel & Tequila
- Release date: November 18, 2019
- Running time: 73 minutes
- Country: Spain
- Language: English
- Box office: $94,187

My Mexican Bretzel is a 2019 Spanish experimental documentary film by Nuria Giménez Lorang, in her directorial debut. Composed entirely of home movies shot by Giménez Lorang's own grandfather and discovered after his death, the film recounts the marriage of a fictional couple.
