= Àlex Brendemühl =

Spanish-German actor

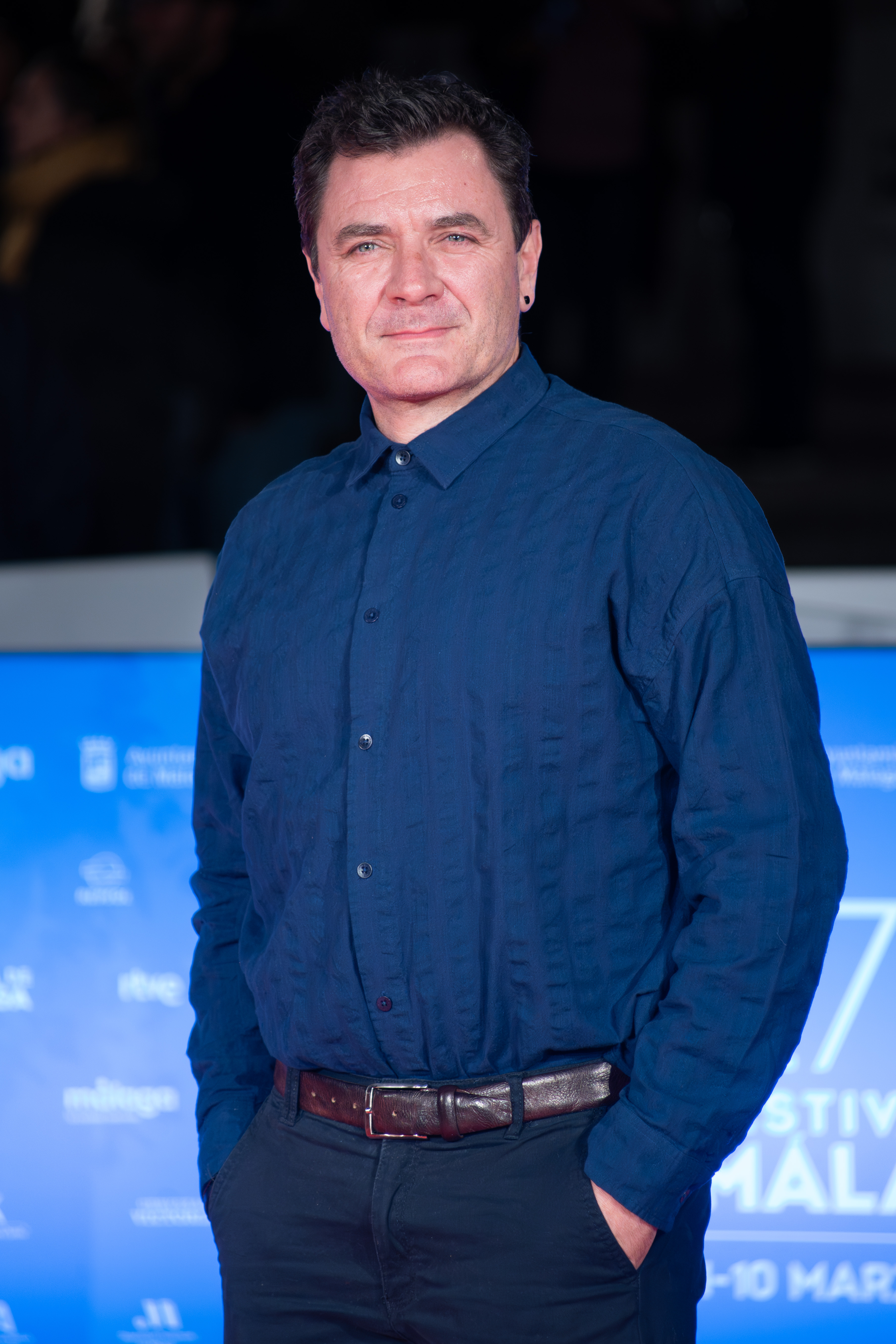
- Brendemühl in 2024
- Born: Àlex Brendemühl i Gubern; 27 November 1972 (age 53); Barcelona, Spain
- Other names: Alex Brendemühl; Álex Brendemühl
- Occupation: Actor
- Years active: 1995–present

Àlex Brendemühl i Gubern (born 27 November 1972) is a Spanish-German actor. He has appeared in more than 60 films and television shows since 1995.

== Life and career ==
Àlex Brendemühl was born in Barcelona on 27 November 1972 to a Spanish mother and a German father. He studied at the German School of Barcelona and the Institut del Teatre. He made his feature film debut as an actor in El perquè de tot plegat (1995).

Brendemühl played the lead role of the Nazi war criminal Josef Mengele in the 2013 film The German Doctor.

== Selected filmography ==
- The Hours of the Day (2003)
- In the City (2003)
- Inconscientes (2004)
- The Silence Before Bach (2007)
- 199 Tips to Be Happy (2008)
- Wallace Line (2009)
- El cónsul de Sodoma (2009)
- Heroes (2010)
- The Mosquito Net (2010)
- Entrelobos (2010)
- Insensibles (2012, also known as Painless)
- Nemez (2012)
- The German Doctor (2013)
- Falling Star (2014)
- Ma Ma (2015)
- Chiamatemi Francesco (2015)
- From the Land of the Moon (2016)
- 7 años (2016)
- Django (2017)
- Transit (2018)
- The Prayer (2018)
- Petra (2018)
- The Offering (2020)
- Staring at Strangers (2022)
- Little Girl Blue (2023)
- Creatura (2023)

== Accolades ==
| Year | Award | Category | Work | Result | Ref. |
|---|---|---|---|---|---|
| 2010 | 2nd Gaudí Awards | Best Actor | The Two Lives of Andrés Rabadán | Won | |
| 2013 | 5th Gaudí Awards | Best Actor | The Forest | Nominated | |
| 2013 | 7th Sur Awards | Best Actor | The German Doctor | Won | |
| 2015 | 7th Gaudí Awards | Best Actor | Falling Star | Nominated | |
| 2019 | 11th Gaudí Awards | Best Actor | Petra | Nominated | |
| 2020 | 12th Gaudí Awards | Best Supporting Actor | Mother | Nominated | |
| 2021 | 8th Feroz Awards | Best Supporting Actor in a Film | Coven | Nominated | |
| 2021 | 13th Gaudí Awards | Best Actor | The Offering | Nominated | |
| 2023 | 15th Gaudí Awards | Best Supporting Actor | Stories Not to Be Told | Won | |
| 2024 | 16th Gaudí Awards | Best Supporting Actor | Creatura | Won | |
| 2024 | 38th Goya Awards | Best Supporting Actor | Creatura | Nominated | |
| 2024 | 32nd Actors and Actresses Union Awards | Best Film Actor in a Secondary Role | Creatura | Won | |
