= Cinema Jove =

Annual international film festival in Valencia, Spain

- Location: Valencia, Spain
- Founded: 1986
- Founded by: Generalitat Valenciana
- Awards: Luna de Valencia
- Hosted by: Institut Valencià de Cultura
- Artistic director: Carlos Madrid (2017–present)
- No. of films: 40th (2025)
- Language: Multilingual
- Website: www.cinemajove.com

Cinema Jove (officially the Valencia International Film Festival – Cinema Jove; Spanish: Festival Internacional de Cine de Valencia – Cinema Jove) is an annual film festival held in Valencia, Spain, typically during the last week of June. Established in 1986, the festival is dedicated to promoting emerging international filmmakers, restricting its official competition sections to directors under the age of 40. It is accredited by the International Federation of Film Producers Associations (FIAPF) in the category of "Specialised Competitive Festivals".

Cinema Jove is organised by the Generalitat Valenciana through the Institut Valencià de Cultura (IVC), with additional support from the Valencia City Council, the Diputació de València, and the ICAA of the Spanish Ministry of Culture.

== History ==
=== Origins ===
The origins of Cinema Jove trace back to 1985, when educators Adolfo Bellido and Mario Viché organised a screening of student-made films at the offices of the Conselleria de Cultura y Educación of the Generalitat Valenciana. The following year, the Servei de Joventut of the Conselleria officially established the event under the name Certamen de Cine y Vídeo Juvenil de la Comunidad Valenciana (Youth Film and Video Contest of the Valencian Community), with Viché as director.

The festival was conceived with a pedagogical purpose: to support audiovisual education in schools across the Valencian Community, encourage student engagement with filmmaking tools, and provide a forum for presenting student work.

=== Growth and internationalisation ===
Within four years, the festival expanded from a local initiative to a national and international event. An Official Short Film Section was established, and the festival's duration was extended to one full week. In 1991, an Official Feature Film Section was added.

Cinema Jove subsequently gained FIAPF accreditation as a specialised competitive festival, solidifying its position among internationally recognised film events. According to Unifrance, it became one of the leading specialised film festivals in Spain, with its alumni regularly going on to receive recognition at major festivals worldwide.

=== Recent developments ===
A competitive section for web series was introduced in 2016. In 2023, the festival added the Òrbites section, dedicated to non-fiction and experimental works. The 40th edition took place from 19 to 28 June 2025, with Romanian filmmaker Radu Jude receiving the Luna de Valencia career award.

=== Festival directors ===
Period	Director
1986–1996	Mario Viché
1997–1999	José Luis Rado
2000–2016	Rafael Maluenda
2017–present	Carlos Madrid

== Programme ==
=== Competitive sections ===
Cinema Jove features five official competitive sections, each with its own professional jury and a Jurat Jove (Young Jury) composed of students:

- Official Feature Film Section – Approximately ten international feature films (over 60 minutes) not previously screened in Spain, directed by filmmakers under 40 years of age.
- Official Short Film Section – Around 50 to 60 international short films (up to 30 minutes), with the minimum requirement of a premiere in the Valencian Community, directed by filmmakers under 40.
- Official Series Section – An international selection of series (originally web series when the section was introduced in 2016), accompanied by panel discussions and roundtables on series production.
- Òrbites – Introduced in 2023, this section focuses on non-fiction productions and experimental film languages.
- Encuentro Audiovisual de Jóvenes (Youth Audiovisual Encounter) – The foundational section of Cinema Jove, a national competition for short films by students aged 5 to 25, divided into Children's (up to 12), Youth (13–20), and Amateur (16–25) categories.

=== Non-competitive sections ===
The festival also programmes several recurring non-competitive sections:

- El Joven / La Joven – An annual retrospective of the early works of an established filmmaker, showing films they directed before the age of 40. Past editions have featured the early works of David Lynch, Agnès Varda, the Coen brothers, David Cronenberg, Brian De Palma, and Ridley Scott.
- High School – A cycle of feature films from recent decades set in secondary schools, typically combining American high school films with European and Asian titles.
- Dioses del Anime – A selection of contemporary and classic anime titles.
- Luna de Valencia retrospective – A complete filmography screening accompanying the annual Luna de Valencia career award.

=== Industry sections ===
Cinema Jove includes two industry-oriented sections:

- Curt Creixent – Focused on short films, featuring roundtables, pitch sessions, and professional meetings.
- ProMercat – Dedicated to feature films, with similar industry activities.

== Awards ==
The principal awards at Cinema Jove are known as the Luna de Valencia (Moon of Valencia). The main competition prizes include:

- Luna de Valencia for Best Feature Film – €35,000, awarded to the film's Spanish distributor
- Audience Award for Best Feature Film
- Luna de Valencia for Best Short Film – €9,000
- Luna de Valencia for Best Series
- Young Jury Awards for best feature and short film
- Best Poster Award (since 2021)

=== Luna de Valencia career award ===
Since 2010, Cinema Jove has presented the Luna de Valencia career award to honour a filmmaker recognised for a distinctive cinematographic style and significant contribution to contemporary cinema. The recipient visits the festival for a public meeting and a full retrospective of their work is screened.

Year	Recipient
2010	Matteo Garrone
2011	
2012	
2013	
2014	
2015	Ruben Östlund
2016	
2017	Stephen Frears
2018	Fernando Bovaira
2019	Miguel Gomes
2020	
2021	Lynne Ramsay
2022	
2023	Sean Baker
2024	
2025	Radu Jude

=== Un Futuro de Cine award ===
Since 1993, Cinema Jove has presented the Un Futuro de Cine (A Future of Cinema) award to recognise the trajectory of young filmmakers or performers.

== Notable participants ==
Over its history, Cinema Jove has featured the work of filmmakers who subsequently achieved international prominence. Directors who participated in the festival during the early stages of their careers include Lynne Ramsay, Mia Hansen-Løve, Miguel Gomes, Pablo Trapero, Lone Scherfig, Tomas Alfredson, Ruben Östlund, Álex de la Iglesia, Icíar Bollaín, Alejandro Amenábar, Juanma Bajo Ulloa, Marc Recha, Rithy Panh, Matteo Garrone, Thomas Vinterberg, Stephen Frears, Daniel Calparsoro, and Miguel Albaladejo.

Lynne Ramsay, for example, competed at Cinema Jove with her first two feature films, Ratcatcher and Morvern Callar, before going on to direct We Need to Talk About Kevin and You Were Never Really Here. Radu Jude's first short film, The Lamp with a Cap (2006), won an award at Cinema Jove before he went on to win the Golden Bear at the Berlin International Film Festival.

== Venues ==
Cinema Jove screenings and events take place at several locations across Valencia, including the Teatro Principal, the Teatre Rialto and Edificio Rialto (the festival's main venue and headquarters), the Centre del Carme Cultura Contemporània (CCCC), and the Palau de les Arts Reina Sofía. The festival offices are located at Plaza de la Almoina, 4, 1st floor, Valencia.

== See also ==
- List of film festivals in Europe
- FIAPF
- San Sebastián International Film Festival
- Sitges Film Festival
