= 26th Forqué Awards =

2021 Spanish film and television awards

- Date: 16 January 2021
- Site: Palacio Municipal de Congresos, Madrid, Spain
- Hosted by: Miguel Ángel Muñoz; Aitana Sánchez-Gijón
- Organized by: EGEDA

Highlights
- Best Picture: Schoolgirls
- Best Actor: Javier Cámara; The People Upstairs
- Best Actress: Patricia López Arnaiz; Ane Is Missing

Television coverage
- Network: La 1

The 26th ceremony of the Forqué Awards, presented by EGEDA, was held on 16 January 2021 at the Palacio Municipal de Congresos in Madrid. The gala, aired on La 1, was hosted by Miguel Ángel Muñoz and Aitana Sánchez-Gijón.

== History ==
The nominations were disclosed in November 2020. The awards added television categories (Best Series and Best Female and Male Performances in a Series) for the first time in the 26th edition.

The ceremony was hosted at the Madrid's Palacio Municipal de Congresos on 16 January 2021 and broadcast on La 1. The gala featured musical performances by Pablo Alborán and Pablo López, as well as comedy performances by J. J. Vaquero and Sara Escudero. It was hosted by Miguel Ángel Muñoz and Aitana Sánchez-Gijón.

The chairman of EGEDA, Enrique Cerezo, gifted the EGEDA Gold Medal recognizing a career in the audiovisual industry to Fernando Colomo and Beatriz de la Gándara.

== Winners and nominees ==
The winners and nominees are listed as follows:

Best Fiction or Animation Film: Schoolgirls; Adu; Coven; Rosa's Wedding	Best Fiction Series: Riot Police; Money Heist; Patria; Veneno
Best Male Performance in a Film: Javier Cámara — The People Upstairs; David Verdaguer — One for All; Juan Diego Botto — The Europeans; Mario Casas — Cross the Line	Best Female Performance in a Film: Patricia López Arnáiz — Ane Is Missing; Andrea Fandos — Schoolgirls; Candela Peña — Rosa's Wedding; Kiti Mánver — One Careful Owner
Best Male Performance in a Series: Hovik Keuchkerian — Riot Police; Álex García — Riot Police; Javier Cámara — Vamos Juan; Raúl Arévalo — Riot Police	Best Female Performance in a Series: Elena Irureta — Patria; Ane Gabarain — Patria; Daniela Santiago — Veneno; Vicky Luengo — Riot Police
Best Documentary Film: The Year of the Discovery; Antonio Machado. Los días azules; Cartas mojadas; El drogas	Best Latin-American Film: New Order; Forgotten We'll Be; The Mole Agent; The Heist of the Century
Best Short Film: Yalla; A la cara; Yo	Cinema and Education in Values: One for All; Adu; Rosa's Wedding; Schoolgirls
