= Ane Gabarain =

Spanish actress

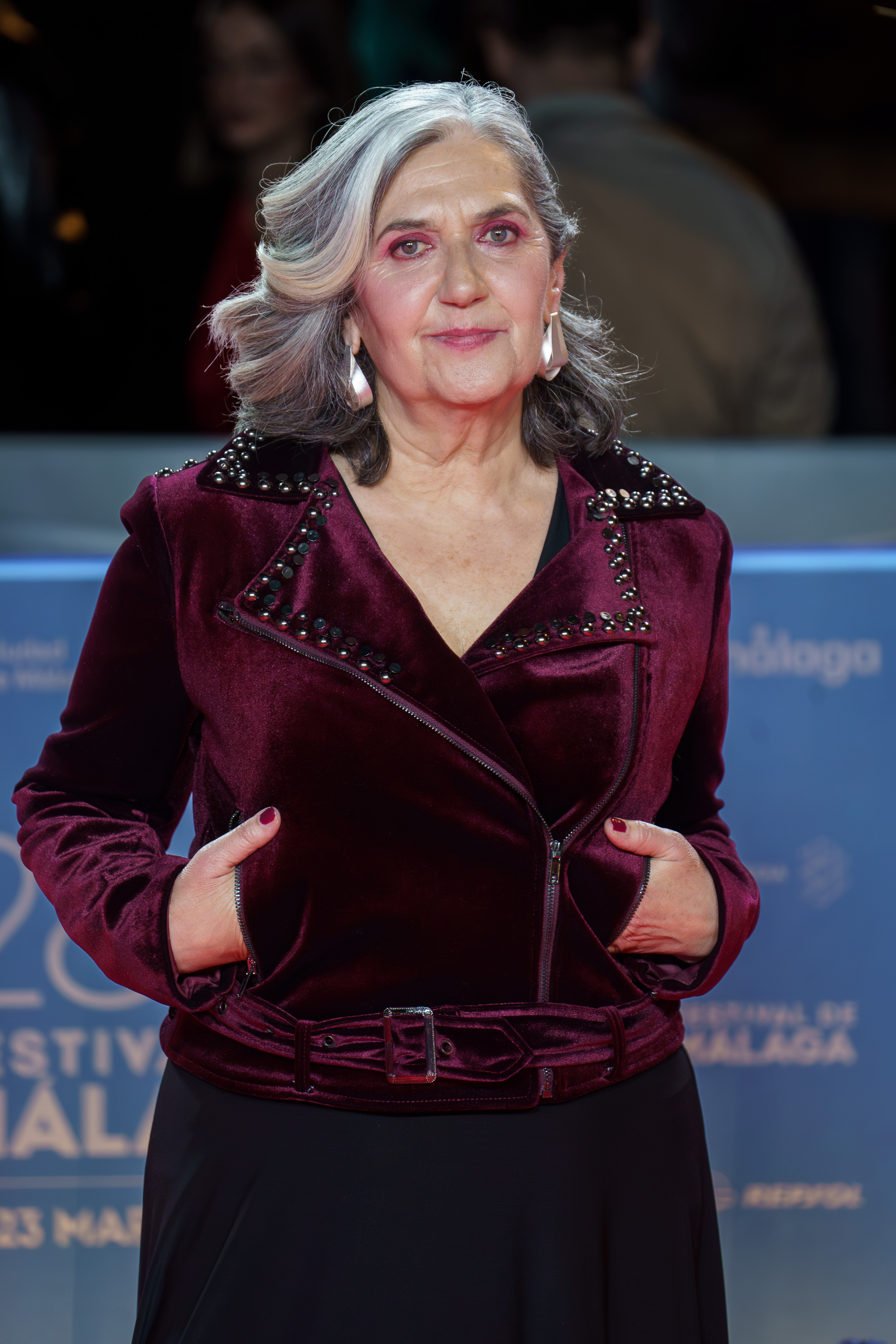
- Gabarain in 2025
- Born: Ane Gabarain Gaztelumendi; 2 June 1963 (age 62); San Sebastián, Gipuzkoa, Spain
- Occupation: Actress

Ane Gabarain Gaztelumendi (born 2 June 1963) is a Spanish actress from the Basque Country.

== Life and career ==
Ane Gabarain Gaztelumendi was born in San Sebastián, Gipuzkoa on 2 June 1963.

She made her film debut in Maider. A mostly comic performer well known in Basque Country, most of her professional career has been in various series on Euskal Telebista [Basque Television] (ETB), such as Bi eta bat, Jaun ta Jabe, and Mi querido Klikowsky. In Spain, she was highlighted in minor speaking roles in La comunidad and 800 Bullets by Álex de la Iglesia. She also played the role of Maritxu, in the series Allí abajo and that of Miren in Patria, an HBO series with participation from HBO Latin America, based on the novel of the same name by Fernando Aramburu. For the latter she was nominated for an International Emmy. She also portrayed Concha in Periodistas. In addition to her film and television work, she has been long involved in the Basque stage scene.

== Filmography ==
=== Film ===
| Year | Title | Role | Notes | Ref. |
|---|---|---|---|---|
| 1989 | Maider | | | |
| 1994 | Maité | Maixol | English: Dear | |
| 1995 | Adiós Toby, adiós | Madre | English: Goodbye Toby, Goodbye | |
| 1995 | Sálvate si puedes | town planning official | English: Save Yourself If You Can | |
| 1996 | Fuma y deja fumar | | English: Smoke and Quit Smoking | |
| 1999 | 40 ezetz | Arantxa | (short film) | |
| 1999 | Pecata minuta | Sister Rosarito | English: Minute Sin | |
| 2000 | La comunidad | Karina | UK title: Common Wealth | |
| 2002 | 800 Bullets | Jacomta | Spanish: 800 Balas | |
| 2004 | El coche de pedales | Aunt Mercedes | English: The Pedal Car | |
| 2009 | Sukalde kontuak | | English: Kitchen Matters | |
| 2010 | 80 egunean | Josune | English: For 80 Days | |
| 2014 | Loreak | Jaione | US title: Flowers | |
| 2017 | Bomb Scared | Beitia | Spanish: Fe de etarras | |
| 2017 | The Bastards' Fig Tree | Madre del caserío | Spanish: La higuera de los bastardos | |
| 2019 | Agur Etxebesteǃ | Sara | English: Goodbye Etxebesteǃ | |
| 2023 | 20,000 Species of Bees | Lourdes | Spanish: 20.000 especies de abejas | |

=== Television ===
| Year | Title | Role | Notes | Ref. |
|---|---|---|---|---|
| 2014 | El corazón del océano | Sancha | | |
| 2015–19 | Allí abajo | Maritxu | | |
| 2020 | Patria | Miren | | |
| 2021 | Amar es para siempre | Carmen Corcuera de Lucas | Introduced in season 10 | |
| 2023 | Un cuento perfecto (A Perfect Story) | Asun | | |

== Accolades ==
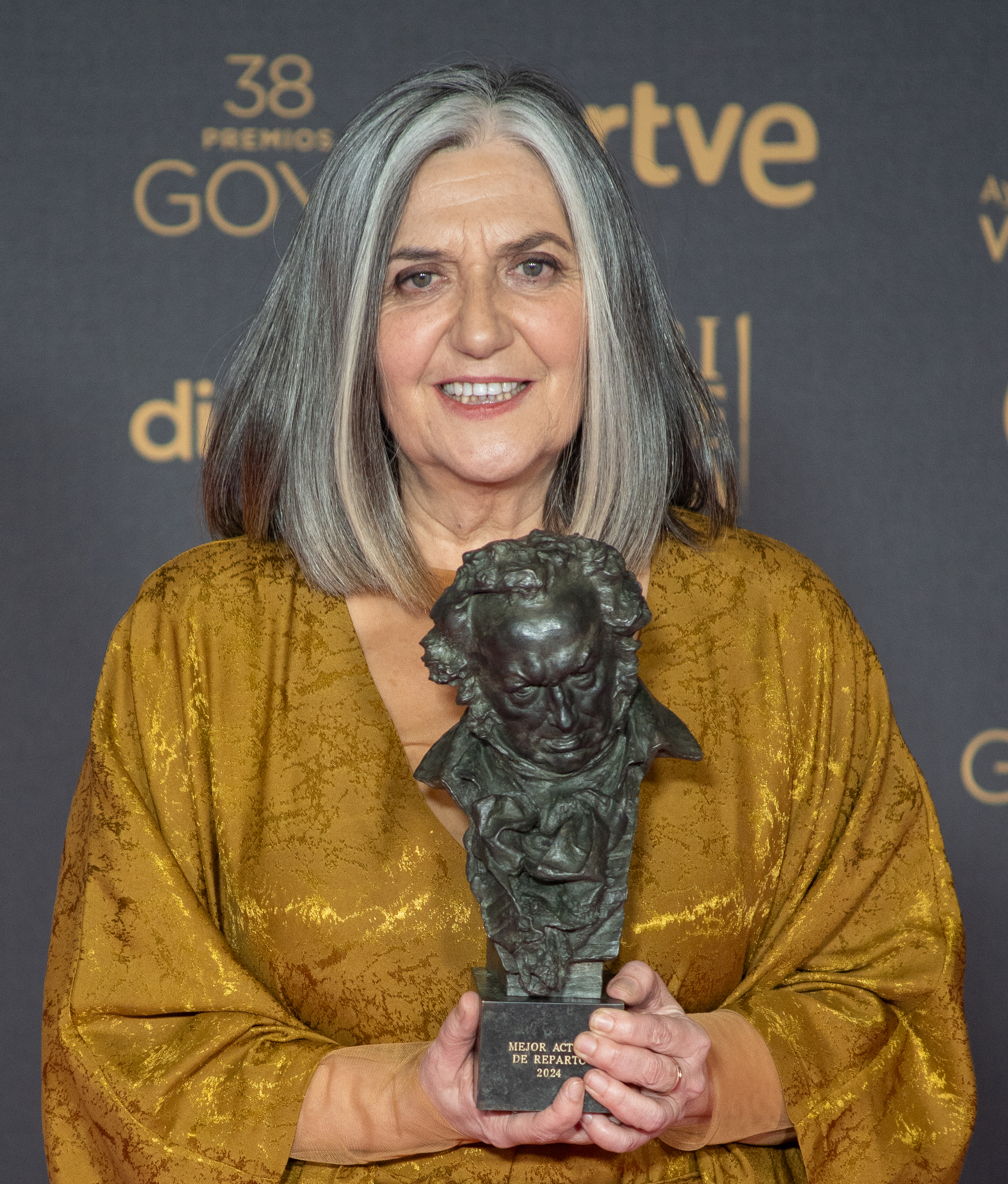
Gabarain holding her Goya award for her performance in 20,000 Species of Bees

| Year | Award | Category | Work | Result | Ref. |
|---|---|---|---|---|---|
| 2021 | 26th Forqué Awards | Best Actress in a TV Series | Patria | Nominated | |
| 2021 | 8th Feroz Awards | Best Main Actress in a Series | Patria | Nominated | |
| 2021 | 49th International Emmy Awards | Best Actress | Patria | Nominated | |
| 2024 | 16th Gaudí Awards | Best Supporting Actress | 20,000 Species of Bees | Nominated | |
| 2024 | 38th Goya Awards | Best Supporting Actress | 20,000 Species of Bees | Won | |
| 2024 | 32nd Actors and Actresses Union Awards | Best Film Actress in a Secondary Role | 20,000 Species of Bees | Won | |
| 2024 | 11th Platino Awards | Best Supporting Actress | 20,000 Species of Bees | Won | |
