= 8th Feroz Awards =

2021 Spanish film and television awards

- Date: 2 March 2021
- Site: Teatro Coliseum, Madrid
- Hosted by: Pilar Castro
- Organized by: Asociación de Informadores Cinematográficos de España

Highlights
- Best Picture: Schoolgirls (Drama); Rosa's Wedding (Comedy)
- Best Direction: Pilar Palomero; Schoolgirls
- Best Actor: Mario Casas; Cross the Line
- Best Actress: Patricia López Arnaiz; Ane Is Missing
- Most awards: Schoolgirls (3)
- Most nominations: Rosa's Wedding (9)

Television coverage
- Network: YouTube

The 8th ceremony of the Feroz Awards was held at the Teatro Coliseum in Madrid, on 2 March 2021. The ceremony was hosted by Pilar Castro.

Originally scheduled to take place on 8 February 2021 at the Teatro Ciudad de Alcobendas in Alcobendas, the ceremony was postponed to 2 March and moved to the Teatro Coliseum in Madrid due to the introduction of restrictions related to the evolution of the COVID-19 pandemic in the Community of Madrid. Esty Quesada, Asaari Bibang and Samantha Hudson staged stand-up performances.

== Winners and nominees ==
Nominations for seventeen categories were announced on 10 December 2020 in Madrid by Inma Cuesta and Andrés Velencoso. Nominations for Premio Especial and Best Documentary were announced on 21 December 2020. The awards were presented on 2 March 2021.

Winners are listed first, highlighted in boldface.

=== Film ===
**Best Drama Film**: **Schoolgirls**; Ane Is Missing; Coven; Cross the Line; The Year of the Discovery	**Best Comedy Film**: **Rosa's Wedding**; The Europeans; The People Upstairs; Unfortunate Stories; Unknown Origins
**Best Director**: **Pilar Palomero** – **Schoolgirls**; Icíar Bollaín – Rosa's Wedding; Cesc Gay – The People Upstairs; Luis López Carrasco – The Year of the Discovery; David Victori – Cross the Line	**Best Screenplay**: **Pilar Palomero** – **Schoolgirls**; Icíar Bollaín, Alicia Luna – Rosa's Wedding; Javier Fesser, Claro García – Unfortunate Stories; Luis López Carrasco, Raúl Liarte – The Year of the Discovery; Marina Parés Pulido, David Pérez Sañudo – Ane Is Missing
**Best Actor**: **Mario Casas** – **Cross the Line** as Dani; Raúl Arévalo – The Europeans as Miguel Alonso; Javier Cámara – The People Upstairs as Julio; Javier Gutiérrez – The Occupant as Javier Muñoz; David Verdaguer – One for All as Aleix	**Best Actress**: **Patricia López Arnaiz** – **Ane Is Missing** as Lide; Amaia Aberasturi – Coven as Ana; Andrea Fandos – Schoolgirls as Celia; Kiti Mánver – One Careful Owner as Lola; Candela Peña – Rosa's Wedding as Rosa
**Best Supporting Actor**: **Juan Diego Botto** – **The Europeans** as Antonio; Chema del Barco – The Plan as Ramón; Ramón Barea – Rosa's Wedding as Antonio; Àlex Brendemühl – Coven as Rostegui; Sergi López – Rosa's Wedding as Armando; Alberto San Juan – The People Upstairs as Salva	**Best Supporting Actress**: **Verónica Echegui** – **My Heart Goes Boom!** as Amparo; Juana Acosta – One Careful Owner as Sara; Natalia de Molina – Schoolgirls as Adela; Nathalie Poza – Rosa's Wedding as Violeta; Paula Usero – Rosa's Wedding as Lidia
**Best Original Soundtrack**: **Koldo Uriarte**, **Bingen Mendizabal** – **Baby**; Roque Baños – Adú; Maite Arroitajauregi, Aranzazu Calleja – Coven; Roque Baños – My Heart Goes Boom!; Federico Jusid, Adrián Foulkes – Cross the Line	**Best Documentary Film**: **The Year of the Discovery**; The Challenge: ETA; Courtroom 3H; Dear Werner; In a Whisper
**Best Trailer**: **Javier Fesser**, **Rafa Martínez** – **Unfortunate Stories**; Marta Longas, Rafa Martínez – Coven; Juan Santiago – Rosa's Wedding; Miguel Ángel Trudu – My Heart Goes Boom!; Mariana Francisco, Juan Gabriel García Román – Schoolgirls	**Best Film Poster**: **Jordi Labanda** – **Rifkin's Festival**; Natalia Montes – Coven; Pablo Dávila, Espinar Gabriel – The Art of Return; David de las Heras – The Europeans; Alfredo Borés and Berta González – The Queen of the Lizards
**Special Award**: **My Mexican Bretzel**; The Plan; Red Moon Tide; The Queen of the Lizards; White on White

==== Films with multiple nominations and awards ====
Films that received multiple nominations
Nominations	Films
9	Rosa's Wedding
6	Coven
6	Schoolgirls
4	Cross the Line
4	The Europeans
4	The People Upstairs
4	The Year of the Discovery
3	Ane Is Missing
3	My Heart Goes Boom!
3	Unfortunate Stories
2	One Careful Owner
2	The Plan
2	The Queen of the Lizards

Films that received multiple awards
Awards	Film
3	Schoolgirls

=== Television ===
**Best Drama Series**: **Riot Police** (Movistar+); 30 Coins (HBO Europe); The Ministry of Time (TVE); Patria (HBO Europe); Veneno (Atresplayer Premium)	**Best Comedy Series**: **Vamos Juan** (TNT España); Mira lo que has hecho (Movistar+); Nasdrovia (Movistar+); Vergüenza (Movistar+)
**Best Main Actor in a Series**: **Eduard Fernández** – **30 Coins** (HBO Europe) as Father Manuel Vergara; **Hovik Keuchkerian** – **Riot Police** (Movistar+) as Salvador Osorio; Raúl Arévalo – Riot Police (Movistar+) as Diego López Rodero; Javier Cámara – Vamos Juan (TNT España) as Juan Carrasco; Álex García – Riot Police (Movistar+) as Alexánder Parra Rosales	**Best Main Actress in a Series**: **Elena Irureta** – **Patria** (HBO Europe) as Bittori; Ane Gabarain – Patria (HBO Europe) as Miren Uzkudun; Vicky Luengo – Riot Police (Movistar+) as Laia Urquijo; Megan Montaner – 30 Coins (HBO Europe) as Elena Martín; Daniela Santiago – Veneno (Atresplayer Premium) as La Veneno
**Best Supporting Actor in a Series**: **Patrick Criado** – **Riot Police** (Movistar+) as Rubén Murillo; Mikel Laskurain – Patria (HBO Europe) as Joxian Garmendia; Eneko Sagardoy – Patria (HBO Europe) as Gorka Garmendia Uzkudun; Manolo Solo – 30 Coins (HBO Europe) as Cardinal Fabio Santoro; Guillermo Toledo – The Minions of Midas (Netflix) as Inspector Alfredo Conte	**Best Supporting Actress in a Series**: **Loreto Mauleón** – **Patria** (HBO Europe) as Arantxa Garmendia Uzkudun; Susana Abaitua – Patria (HBO Europe) as Nerea Lertxundi; Macarena Gómez – 30 Coins (HBO Europe) as Merche; Carmen Machi – 30 Coins (HBO Europe) as Carmen; Paca La Piraña – Veneno (Atresplayer Premium) as herself

==== Series with multiple nominations and awards ====
Series that received multiple nominations
Nominations	Series
7	Patria
6	30 Coins
6	Riot Police
3	Veneno
2	Vamos Juan

Series that received multiple awards
Awards	Series
3	Riot Police
2	Patria

== Honorary Feroz Award ==
- Victoria Abril
