= Patria (TV series) =

Historical drama television series

- Promotional poster
- Genre: Historical drama
- Created by: Aitor Gabilondo
- Based on: Patria by Fernando Aramburu
- Written by: Aitor Gabilondo
- Directed by: Félix Viscarret; Óscar Pedraza
- Starring: Elena Irureta; Ane Gabarain; Loreto Mauleón; Eneko Sagardoy; Susana Abaitua; Mikel Laskurain; José Ramón Soroiz; Íñigo Aranbarri; Jon Olivares
- Composer: Fernando Velázquez
- Country of origin: Spain
- Original language: Spanish
- No. of seasons: 1
- No. of episodes: 8

Production
- Cinematography: Álvaro Gutiérrez
- Editors: Alberto del Campo; Victoria Lammers
- Production company: Alea Media

Original release
- Network: HBO Europe
- Release: September 27 – November 8, 2020

Patria is a 2020 Spanish historical drama television limited series produced by Alea Media for HBO Europe, with participation from HBO Latin America, based on the novel of the same name by Fernando Aramburu. Created and written by Aitor Gabilondo, the series follows two women who used to be close friends and become estranged when the husband of one of them is killed by Basque terrorist group ETA. The first two episodes of the eight-part series premiered on September 27, 2020 on HBO Europe, HBO Go, HBO Now and HBO Max.

== Cast ==
- Elena Irureta as Bittori
- Ane Gabarain as Miren
- Loreto Mauleón as Arantxa
- Eneko Sagardoy as Gorka
- Susana Abaitua as Nerea
- Mikel Laskurain as Joxian
- José Ramón Soroiz as Txato
- Íñigo Aranbarri as Xabier
- Jon Olivares as Joxe Mari
- Alvar Gordejuela as Juancar
- Fernando Guallar as Quique
- Begoña Maestre as Aránzazu
- Borja Espinosa as Ramuntxo

== Episodes ==
No.	Title	Directed by	Written by	Original release date
1	"Benign October" (Octubre benigno)	Félix Viscarret	Aitor Gabilondo	September 27, 2020
2	"Encounters" (Encuentros)	Félix Viscarret	Aitor Gabilondo	September 27, 2020
3	"Last Snacks" (Últimas meriendas)	Félix Viscarret	Aitor Gabilondo	October 4, 2020
4	"Txato, Entzun" (Txato, entzun, pim, pam, pum)	Félix Viscarret	Aitor Gabilondo	October 11, 2020
5	"The Land of the Silent" (El país de los callados)	Óscar Pedraza	Aitor Gabilondo	October 18, 2020
6	"Homelands and Follies" (Patrias y mandangas)	Óscar Pedraza	Aitor Gabilondo	October 25, 2020
7	"Bloody Bread" (Pan ensangrentado)	Óscar Pedraza	Aitor Gabilondo	November 1, 2020
8	"Sunday Morning" (Mañana de domingo)	Óscar Pedraza	Aitor Gabilondo	November 8, 2020

== Release ==
The series was originally scheduled for a May 17, 2020 release but, due to the COVID-19 pandemic, post-production could not be completed. The release date was delayed to September 27, 2020. The first two episodes were made available on streaming in twenty one European countries via HBO Europe, and in the United States, Latin America and the Caribbean via HBO Go, HBO Now and HBO Max. The rest of the episodes were released on a weekly basis. The series also aired on HBO Latino from September 30, 2020. For promotional purposes, the first episode also aired on free-to-air commercial channel Telecinco in Spain on September 29, 2020.

Prior to its streaming premiere, the series was screened in its entirety at the 2020 San Sebastián International Film Festival on September 18, 2020.

Canal+ acquired the rights to air the series in France.

== Awards and nominations ==
Year	Award	Category	Nominee(s)	Result	Ref.
2021	Forqué Awards	Best TV Series	Patria	Nominated	
2021	Forqué Awards	Best Actress in a TV Series	Elena Irureta	Won	
2021	Forqué Awards	Best Actress in a TV Series	Ane Gabarain	Nominated	
2021	8th MiM Series Awards	Best Miniseries		Won	
2021	8th MiM Series Awards	Best Screenplay	Aitor Gabilondo	Nominated	
2021	8th MiM Series Awards	Best Direction	Óscar Pedraza & Félix Viscarret	Nominated	
2021	8th MiM Series Awards	Best Drama Actress	Ane Gabarain	Joint winners	
2021	8th MiM Series Awards	Best Drama Actress	Elena Irureta	Joint winners	
2021	8th Feroz Awards	Best Drama Series		Nominated	
2021	8th Feroz Awards	Best Main Actress in a Series	Ane Gabarain	Nominated	
2021	8th Feroz Awards	Best Main Actress in a Series	Elena Irureta	Won	
2021	8th Feroz Awards	Best Supporting Actress in a Series	Susana Abaitua	Nominated	
2021	8th Feroz Awards	Best Supporting Actress in a Series	Loreto Mauleón	Won	
2021	8th Feroz Awards	Best Supporting Actor in a Series	Mikel Laskurain	Nominated	
2021	8th Feroz Awards	Best Supporting Actor in a Series	Eneko Sagardoy	Nominated	
2021	8th Platino Awards	Best Ibero-American Miniseries or TV series	Patria	Won	
2021	8th Platino Awards	Best Series Creator	Aitor Gabilondo	Won	
2021	8th Platino Awards	Best Actress in a Miniseries or TV series	Elena Irureta	Won	
2021	8th Platino Awards	Best Supporting Actress in a Miniseries or TV series	Loreto Mauleón	Won	
2021	8th Platino Awards	Best Supporting Actress in a Miniseries or TV series	Susana Abaitua	Nominated	
2021	49th International Emmy Awards	Best Actress	Ane Gabarain	Nominated	
