= 23rd Málaga Film Festival =

2021 film festival

- Official poster by Pedro Cabañas
- Opening film: Rosa's Wedding
- Closing film: The Heist of the Century
- Location: Málaga, Spain
- Awards: Golden Biznaga (Schoolgirls and Summer White)
- Festival date: 21–30 August 2020

Málaga Film Festival
- 2021 2019

The 23rd Málaga Film Festival took place from 21 to 30 August 2020 in Málaga, Andalusia, Spain. It was originally set to run 13–22 March 2020, but it was postponed due to the COVID-19 pandemic.

== Background ==
In November 2019, the festival presented the official poster for the 23rd edition designed by Pedro Cabañas. The official selection included 23 titles (4 of them in non-competitive slots). Because of the onset of the COVID-19 pandemic, the event was postponed barely three days before its intended opening on 13 March 2020. It eventually took place in August 2020 and featured special security measures and reduced activities. Rosa's Wedding opened the official selection. The Heist of the Century closed the festival in a non-competitive screening.

== Jury ==
Main competition

- Álvaro Brechner (president), screenwriter, director, and producer
- Álvaro Cervantes, actor
- Adelfa Calvo, actress
- Pablo Remón, screenwriter, playwright, film and theatre director
- Chus Gutiérrez, director, screenwriter, and actress

Zonazine

- Isabel Bono
- Pepe Domínguez
- Santi Amodeo

== Films ==
The following films were programmed in the official selection.

=== In competition ===
Highlighted title indicates section's best film winner.

English title	Original title	Director(s)	Production countrie(s)
A este lado del mundo		David Trueba	Spain
Black Beach		Esteban Crespo	Spain; Belgium
Crónica de una tormenta		Mariana Barassi	Spain; Argentina
Devil Between the Legs	El diablo entre las piernas	Arturo Ripstein	Mexico; Spain
The Europeans	Los europeos	Víctor García León	Spain; France
Malpaso		Héctor Valdez	Dominican Republic
One Careful Owner	El inconveniente	Bernabé Rico	Spain
Piola		Luis Alejandro Pérez	Chile
Rosa's Wedding	La boda de Rosa	Icíar Bollaín	Spain; France
Schoolgirls	Las niñas	Pilar Palomero	Spain
The Sea Beyond	Un mundo normal	Achero Mañas	Spain
Sky High	Hasta el cielo	Daniel Calparsoro	Spain
El silencio del cazador		Martín Desalvo	Argentina
Summer White	Summer White (Blanco de verano)	Rodrigo Ruiz Patterson	Mexico
Three Summers	Três Verões	Sandra Kogut	Brazil; France

=== Out of competition ===
English title	Original title	Director(s)	Production countrie(s)
The Heist of the Century	El robo del siglo	Ariel Winograd	Argentina

=== Zonazine ===
The Zonazine selection featured the following films:

Highlighted title indicates section's best film winner.

English title	Original title	Director(s)	Production countrie(s)
La botera		Sabrina Blanco	Argentina; Brazil
En medio del laberinto		Salomón Pérez	Peru
Fractal		Mariana González	Mexico
Les dues nits d'ahir		Pau Cruanyes Garrell, Gerard Vidal Barrena	Spain
The Offering	L'ofrena	Ventura Durall	Spain
Red Moon Tide	Lúa vermella	Lois Patiño	Spain
Son of Ox	Filho de Boi	Haroldo Borges, Ernesto Molinero	Brazil
Trains Bound for the Sea	Trenes que van al mar	Hugo Obregón, Manuel Álvarez-Diestro	Spain

=== Málaga Premiere ===
The following titles were programmed in Málaga Premiere section:

English title	Original title	Director(s)	Production countrie(s)
75 días		Marc Romero	Spain
Dehesa, el bosque del lince ibérico		Joaquín Gutiérrez Acha	Spain
Eso que tú me das		Jordi Évole, Ramón Lara	Spain
HIT (episode 1)		Joaquín Oristrell	Spain
Isaac		Ángeles Hernández, David Matamoros	Spain
Mi gran despedida		Antonio Hens, Antonio Álamo	Spain
La mort de Guillem		Carlos Marques-Marcet	Spain
A Stormy Night		David Moragas	Spain

== Awards ==
Some of the main awards conceded at the festival are listed as follows.

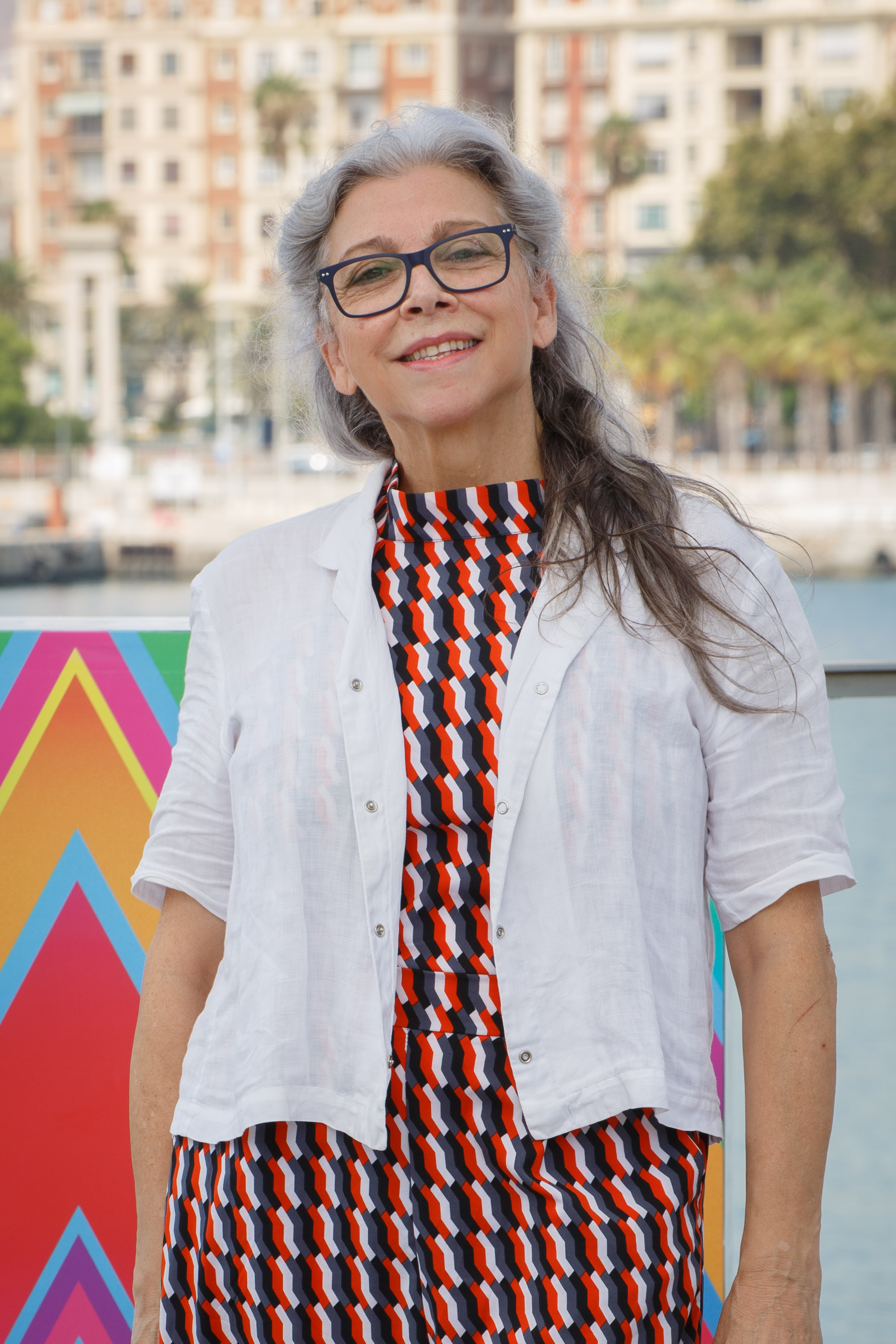
Kiti Mánver (pictured at the festival) won the Best Actress Award

=== Official selection ===
Main competition

- Golden Biznaga for Best Spanish Film: Schoolgirls
- Golden Biznaga for Best Ibero-American Film: Summer White
- Silver Biznaga, Special Jury Prize: Rosa's Wedding
- Silver Biznaga for Best Director: Arturo Ripstein (Devil Between the Legs)
- Silver Biznaga for Best Actress: Kiti Mánver (One Careful Owner) and Regina Casé (Three Summers)
- Silver Biznaga for Best Actor: Alberto Ammann and Pablo Echarri (El silencio del cazador)
- Silver Biznaga for Best Supporting Actress: Nathalie Poza (Rosa's Wedding)
- Silver Biznaga for Best Supporting Actor: Fabián Corres (Summer White)
- Silver Biznaga for Best Screenplay: Rodrigo Ruiz Patterson and Raúl Sebastián Quintanilla (Summer White)
- Silver Biznaga for Best Music: Pascal Gaigne (Malpaso)
- Silver Biznaga for Best Cinematography: Daniela Cajías (Schoolgirls)
- Silver Biznaga for Best Editing: Paula Rupolo (El silencio del cazador)

Other

- Silver Biznaga, Critics' Jury Special Prize: Three Summers
- Silver Biznaga, Audience Award for Best Film: One Careful Owner

=== Zonazine ===
- Silver Biznaga for Best Spanish Film: Red Moon Tide
- Silver Biznaga for Best Latin American Film: La botera
- Silver Biznaga for Best Director: Pau Cruanyes Garell and Gerard Vidal Barrena (Les dues nits d'ahir)
- Silver Biznaga for Best Actress: Nicole Rivadero (La botera)
- Silver Biznaga for Best Actor: Arnau Comas and Oriol Llobet (Les dues nits d'ahir)

=== Myscellaneous ===
- Feroz Puerta Oscura Award: Schoolgirls
- SIGNIS Award: One Careful Owner
