= Baby (2020 film) =

- Theatrical release poster
- Directed by: Juanma Bajo Ulloa
- Produced by: Juanma Bajo Ulloa
- Starring: Rosie Day; Harriet Sansom Harris; Natalia Tena
- Cinematography: Josep M. Civit
- Edited by: Demetrio Elorz
- Music by: Koldo Uriarte; Bingen Mendizabal
- Production companies: Frágil Zinema; La Charito Films
- Distributed by: Festival Films
- Release dates: 10 October 2020 (Sitges); 18 December 2020 (Spain)
- Country: Spain

Baby is a 2020 Spanish psychological thriller film with gothic tale themes directed by Juanma Bajo Ulloa. It features no lines of spoken dialogue. It stars Rosie Day, Harriet Sansom Harris, and Natalia Tena.

== Plot ==
A drug-addicted woman sells her baby and then tries to get them back.

== Cast ==
- Rosie Day
- Harriet Sansom Harris
- Natalia Tena
- Mafalda Carbonell
- Charo López

== Production ==
Baby is a Frágil Zinema and La Charito Films production. It had support from the Basque Government, Diputación Foral de Álava, Ayuntamiento de Vitoria-Gasteiz, and RTVE. Filming began on 5 August 2020 and wrapped by mid September 2020. Shooting locations included Vitoria-Gasteiz, Murgia, Legutio, Nanclares de Gamboa, the park of Garaio, the Otzarreta beech forest and the Nervión waterfall.

== Release ==
The film was presented at the 53rd Sitges Film Festival in October 2020. It also screened at the Valladolid International Film Festival, the Tallinn Black Nights Film Festival, and the Cairo Film Festival. Distributed by Festival Films, it was theatrically released in Spain on 18 December 2020.

== Reception ==
Wendy Ide of Screen Daily deemed the film to be "a macabre psychological thriller which contains no spoken dialogue, but which delves into its cruelly capricious fantasy world through creative sound design, expressive performances from an all-female cast, and extensive use of fake cobwebs".

Quim Casas of El Periódico de Catalunya rated the film 3 out of 5 stars, deeming it to be "an unsatisfactory work, but not negligible. It is an impossible film, extreme and histrionic, but at the same time necessary".

Daniel de Partearroyo of Cinemanía rated the film 5 out of 5 stars, deeming it to be "another piece of goldsmithing by Bajo Ulloa that leaves you speechless".

Raquel Hernández Luján of HobbyConsolas rated the film 65 out of 100 points ("acceptable"), assessing that it is "a very particular film, baroque and excessive", with both brilliant and uninspiring moments, also considering that the script is not well achieved and it sometimes is either confusing or bordering on the ridiculous.

Fausto Fernández of Fotogramas rated the film 4 out of 5 stars, considering that it manages to "reinvent the codes of 1970s horror-genre films".

== Accolades ==
Year	Award	Category	Nominee(s)	Result	Ref.
2021	8th Feroz Awards	Best Original Music	Koldo Uriarte, Bingen Mendizábal	Won	
2021	35th Goya Awards	Best Director	Juanma Bajo Ulloa	Nominated	
2021	35th Goya Awards	Best Original Score	Bingen Mendizábal, Koldo Uriarte	Nominated	
2021	13th Gaudí Awards	Best Cinematography	Josep M. Civit	Nominated	

== See also ==
- List of Spanish films of 2020
