= Riot Police (TV series) =

Spanish television series

- Promotional poster
- Spanish: Antidisturbios
- Genre: Police drama; Thriller
- Created by: Isabel Peña; Rodrigo Sorogoyen
- Written by: Isabel Peña; Rodrigo Sorogoyen; Eduardo Villanueva
- Directed by: Rodrigo Sorogoyen; Borja Soler
- Starring: Vicky Luengo; Raúl Arévalo; Álex García; Hovik Keuchkerian; Roberto Álamo; Raúl Prieto; Patrick Criado
- Composer: Olivier Arson
- Country of origin: Spain
- Original language: Spanish
- No. of seasons: 1
- No. of episodes: 6

Production
- Cinematography: Alejandro de Pablo; Diego Cabezas
- Editors: Alberto del Campo; Miguel Doblado; Pedro Collantes
- Production companies: Caballo Films; The Lab Cinema

Original release
- Network: Movistar+
- Release: October 16, 2020

Riot Police (Spanish: Antidisturbios) is a Spanish police drama thriller television series created by Isabel Peña and Rodrigo Sorogoyen for Movistar+. The series follows a group of riot policemen and an internal affairs agent who is investigating them. The six episodes debuted on October 16, 2020 on Movistar+.

== Premise ==
In the midst of a messy house eviction in a corrala in Lavapiés, an African immigrant dies after falling to the ground. The police department of internal affairs takes over in order to determine if it was a case of involuntary manslaughter or negligence on the part of the six riot police agents that took part in the operation to remove the tenants.

== Cast ==
- Vicky Luengo as Laia Urquijo
- Raúl Arévalo as Diego López Rodero
- Álex García as Alexánder Parra Rosales
- Hovik Keuchkerian as Salvador Osorio
- Roberto Álamo as José Antonio Úbeda
- Raúl Prieto as Elías Bermejo
- Patrick Criado as Rubén Murillo
- Tomás del Estal as Moreno
- David Lorente as Rosales

== Episodes ==
No.	Title	Directed by	Written by	Original release date
1	"Osorio"	Rodrigo Sorogoyen	Isabel Peña, Rodrigo Sorogoyen and Eduardo Villanueva	October 16, 2020
2	"López"	Rodrigo Sorogoyen	Isabel Peña, Rodrigo Sorogoyen and Eduardo Villanueva	October 16, 2020
3	"Revilla"	Rodrigo Sorogoyen and Borja Soler	Isabel Peña, Rodrigo Sorogoyen and Eduardo Villanueva	October 16, 2020
4	"Úbeda"	Rodrigo Sorogoyen and Borja Soler	Isabel Peña, Rodrigo Sorogoyen and Eduardo Villanueva	October 16, 2020
5	"Parra"	Rodrigo Sorogoyen	Isabel Peña, Rodrigo Sorogoyen and Eduardo Villanueva	October 16, 2020
6	"Urquijo"	Rodrigo Sorogoyen	Isabel Peña, Rodrigo Sorogoyen and Eduardo Villanueva	October 16, 2020

== Production ==
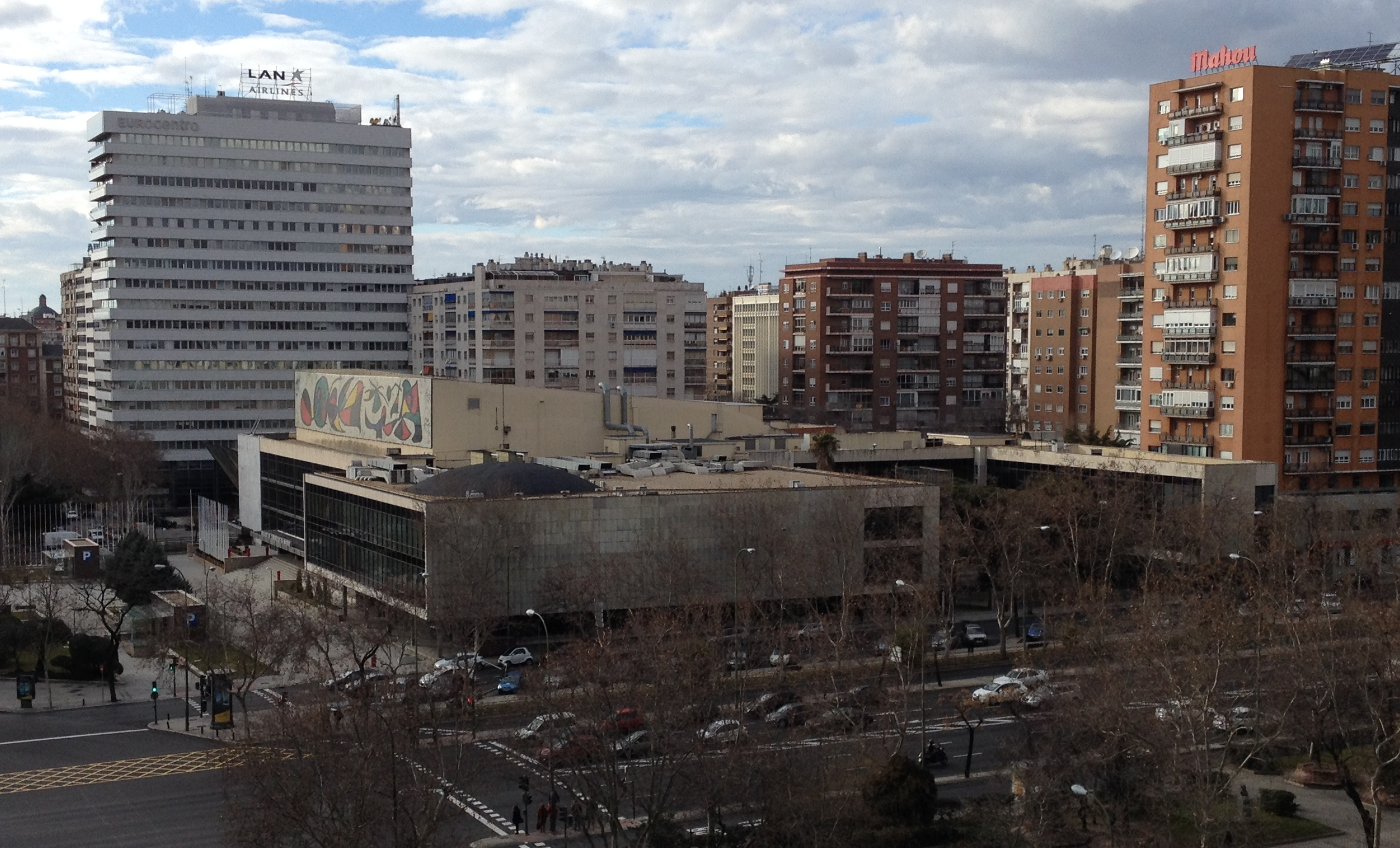
The surroundings of the Santiago Bernabéu, the Palacio de Congresos and the Calle del Poeta Joan Maragall become protagonists at a point of the series

Created by Isabel Peña and Rodrigo Sorogoyen, Antidisturbios is a Movistar+ original production in collaboration with The Lab and Caballo Films. It was written by the Peña and Sorogoyen duo alongside Eduardo Villanueva. The series was filmed in 2019.

It was primarily shot on location in Madrid, the primary fictional setting, even though secondary part of the filming took part in Valencia, A Coruña and Barcelona. Shooting locations included a corrala in Calle del Ventorrillo, Plaza del Callao, Plaza de Juan Goytisolo, the Plaza Nelson Mandela, a police premises in Moratalaz, the surroundings of the Santiago Bernabéu stadium, the Palacio de Congresos, the Calle del Poeta Joan Maragall, or the AZCA undergrounds.

== Release ==
Prior to its release, the first season was pre-screened in its entirety at the 68th San Sebastián International Film Festival on September 25, 2020.

The six episodes of the first season were released on October 16, 2020 on Movistar+.

In France, the series began airing on Polar+ on November 16, 2020.

International rights are distributed by Buendía Estudios.

As of 2021, HBO Max had released the series in Latin American territories.

In Portugal the series was made available through Disney+ on its Star hub, early in 2022.

At the September 2026 Iberseries & Platino Industria market, Mubi was announced to have acquired worldwide rights to the series.

== Awards and nominations ==
Year	Award	Category	Nominee(s)	Result	Ref.
2021	26th Forqué Awards	Best TV Series		Won	
2021	26th Forqué Awards	Best Actor in a TV Series	Hovik Keuchkerian	Won	
2021	26th Forqué Awards	Best Actor in a TV Series	Álex García	Nominated	
2021	26th Forqué Awards	Best Actor in a TV Series	Raúl Arévalo	Nominated	
2021	26th Forqué Awards	Best Actress in a TV Series	Vicky Luengo	Nominated	
2021	8th Feroz Awards	Best Drama Series		Won	
2021	8th Feroz Awards	Best Main Actress in a Series	Vicky Luengo	Nominated	
2021	8th Feroz Awards	Best Main Actor in a Series	Raúl Arévalo	Nominated	
2021	8th Feroz Awards	Best Main Actor in a Series	Álex García	Nominated	
2021	8th Feroz Awards	Best Main Actor in a Series	Hovik Keuchkerian	Won	
2021	8th Feroz Awards	Best Supporting Actor in a Series	Patrick Criado	Won	
2021	3rd ALMA Awards	Best Screenplay (drama series)	Isabel Peña, Rodrigo Sorogoyen and Eduardo Villanueva	Won	
2021	8th Platino Awards	Best Ibero-American Miniseries or TV series		Nominated	
2021	8th Platino Awards	Best Series Creator	Rodrigo Sorogoyen & Isabel Peña	Nominated	
2021	8th Platino Awards	Best Supporting Actor in a Miniseries or TV series	Patrick Criado	Nominated	
2021	68th Ondas Awards	Best Drama Series		Won	
2021	68th Ondas Awards	Best Actress in Spanish Fiction (TV)	Vicky Luengo	Won	
2021	23rd Iris Awards	Best Fiction		Won	
2021	23rd Iris Awards	Best Actor	Raúl Arévalo	Won	
2021	23rd Iris Awards	Best Actress	Vicky Luengo	Nominated	
2021	23rd Iris Awards	Best Direction	Rodrigo Sorogoyen	Won	
2021	23rd Iris Awards	Best Screenplay	Rodrigo Sorogoyen, Isabel Peña and Eduardo Villanueva	Won	
2021	23rd Iris Awards	Best Production	Domingo Corral, Fran Araujo, Sofía Fábregas; Rodrigo Sorogoyen and Isabel Peña	Won	
2021	71st Fotogramas de Plata	Best Television Actress	Vicky Luengo	Won	
2021	71st Fotogramas de Plata	Best Television Actor	Álex García	Nominated	
2022	9th MiM Series Awards	Best Miniseries		Won	
2022	9th MiM Series Awards	Best Direction	Rodrigo Sorogoyen, Borja Soler	Won	
2022	9th MiM Series Awards	Best Drama Actress	Vicky Luengo	Won	
2022	9th MiM Series Awards	Best Drama Actor	Hovik Keucherian	Won	
2022	9th MiM Series Awards	Best Screenplay	Isabel Peña, Rodrigo Sorogoyen, Eduardo Villanueva	Nominated	
2022	30th Actors and Actresses Union Awards	Best TV Actor in a Leading Role	Raúl Arévalo	Nominated	
2022	30th Actors and Actresses Union Awards	Best TV Actor in a Leading Role	Álex García	Nominated	
2022	30th Actors and Actresses Union Awards	Best TV Actor in a Minor Role	Patrick Criado	Won	
