= Ane Is Missing =

2020 Basque film

- Film poster
- Basque: Ane
- Directed by: David Pérez Sañudo
- Written by: Marina Parés; David Pérez Sañudo
- Produced by: Agustín Delgado; David Pérez Sañudo; Elena Maeso
- Starring: Patricia López Arnaiz; Mikel Losada; Jone Laspiur
- Cinematography: Víctor Benavides
- Edited by: Lluís Murua
- Music by: Jorge Granda
- Release dates: 20 September 2020 (Zinemaldia); 16 October 2020 (Spain)
- Running time: 100 minutes
- Country: Spain
- Languages: Basque; Spanish

Ane Is Missing (Basque: Ane) is a 2020 Spanish drama film directed by David Pérez Sañudo and co-written by Marina Parés, starring Patricia López Arnaiz, Mikel Losada, and Jone Laspiur.

The film won the Goya Award for Best Actress (López Arnaiz), along with Best New Actress for Jone Laspiur and Best Adapted Screenplay for Pérez Sañudo and Marina Parés Pulido, from a total of five nominations, at the 35th Goya Awards. At the 8th Feroz Awards, the film won Best Actress, from a total of three nominations.

== Plot ==
Lide, a young mother, works as a security guard for an engineering project that has part of her community up in arms. This drama pales into comparison when, one day, she gets up to find that her daughter Ane is not in the house, nor has her bed been slept in.

Neither the film's characters nor the viewer sees Ane and the heightened tension in the community seems to magnify the void she has left behind. As Lide turns to her ex-partner Fernando (Mikel Losada), Ane’s father, for help, it becomes apparent that she is somehow afraid of this unseen daughter.

== Cast ==
- Patricia López Arnaiz as Lide
- Mikel Losada as Fernando
- Aia Kruse as Leire
- Luis Callejo as Eneko
- Mariana Cordero as Antonia
- David Blanka as Peio
- Jone Laspiur as Ane

== Awards ==
Year	Award	Category	Nominee(s)	Result	Ref.
2021	26th Forqué Awards	Best Actress	Patricia López Arnaiz	Won	
2021	8th Feroz Awards	Best Drama Film		Nominated	
2021	8th Feroz Awards	Best Screenplay	Marina Parés and David Pérez Sañudo	Nominated	
2021	8th Feroz Awards	Best Main Actress in a Film	Patricia López Arnaiz	Won	
2021	76th CEC Medals	Best New Director	David Pérez Sañudo	Nominated	
2021	76th CEC Medals	Best Actress	Patricia López Arnaiz	Nominated	
2021	76th CEC Medals	Best New Actress	Jone Laspiur	Nominated	
2021	35th Goya Awards	Best Film		Nominated	
2021	35th Goya Awards	Best New Director	David Pérez Sañudo	Nominated	
2021	35th Goya Awards	Best Adapted Screenplay	Marina Parés and David Pérez Sañudo	Won	
2021	35th Goya Awards	Best Actress	Patricia López Arnaiz	Won	
2021	35th Goya Awards	Best New Actress	Jone Laspiur	Won	

== See also ==
- List of Spanish films of 2020
