= Black Beach (film) =

- Poster
- Directed by: Esteban Crespo
- Screenplay by: Esteban Crespo; David Moreno
- Produced by: David Naranjo; Luis Collar; Jorge Moreno
- Starring: Raúl Arévalo; Candela Peña; Lidia Nené; Claude Musungayi; Emilio Buale; Melina Matthews; Paulina García
- Cinematography: Ángel Amorós
- Edited by: Fernando Franco; Miguel Doblado
- Music by: Arturo Cardelús
- Production companies: Pris&Batty Films; Nephilim; BlackBeach AIE
- Distributed by: eOne Films Spain
- Release dates: 23 August 2020 (Málaga); 25 September 2020 (Spain)
- Country: Spain
- Language: Spanish

Black Beach is a 2020 Spanish action thriller film directed by Esteban Crespo which stars Raúl Arévalo alongside Candela Peña. It follows a lawyer who is forced to deep dive into his past when he agrees to negotiate with an old friend turned kidnapper.

== Plot ==
Featuring the backdrop of a large-scale political and corporate corruption scheme, Carlos, an unscrupulous executive (and former development cooperator), is sent as a mediator to the kidnapping of an oil company engineer in an African country where he worked in the past, bringing his personal and business interests to collide.

== Cast ==
- Raúl Arévalo as Carlos
- Candela Peña as Ale
- Lidia Nené
- Claude Musungayi
- Emilio Buale
- Melina Matthews as Susan
- Paulina García
- Aída Wellgaye as Ada
- Jimmy Castro as Calixto
- Julius Cotter as Ronald U.N. Envoy
- Luka Peroš

== Production ==
The screenplay was penned by Esteban Crespo and David Moreno. The film is a Pris&Batty Films, Nephilim and BlackBeach AIE production, with the participation of RTVE and Netflix, reportedly boasting a budget of around €7 million. Shooting locations included Ghana, the Canary Islands, Brussels, Toledo, and Madrid.

== Release ==
The film premiered at the 23rd Málaga Film Festival's main competition on 23 August 2020. Distributed by eOne Films Spain, the film was theatrically released in Spain on 25 September 2020.

== Reception ==
Raquel Hernández Luján of HobbyConsolas gave the "ambitious and well structured" film 70 out of 100 points ("good"), highlighting an "enviable" production design while noting that more excitement is missing, with the more compelling story being the subplot pertaining Peña's supporting character.

Quim Casas of El Periódico de Catalunya gave Black Beach 2 out of 5 stars, writing that it "turns out to be an unbalanced film", remaining in no man's land, "solvent at times. Insufficient at other times", with the "things that happen and are said in the African country seeming to come straight out of a colonial comic book".

Sergio F. Pinilla of Cinemanía rated the film 4½ out of 5 stars, concluding as a verdict that "Arevalo's odyssey is entertaining, moving and thought-provoking".

Marta Medina of El Confidencial deemed the "confusing" film to feature "many possibilities and little sincerity", also considering that "there is something too contrived in both the narration and the mise-en-scène, which prevents the story from flowing naturally".

== Accolades ==
| Year | Award | Category | Nominee(s) | Result | Ref. |
|---|---|---|---|---|---|
| 2021 | 35th Goya Awards | Best Production Supervision | Carmen Martínez Muñoz | Nominated | |
| 2021 | 35th Goya Awards | Best Cinematography | Ángel Amorós | Nominated | |
| 2021 | 35th Goya Awards | Best Editing | Fernando Franco, Miguel Doblado | Nominated | |
| 2021 | 35th Goya Awards | Best Art Direction | Montse Sanz | Nominated | |
| 2021 | 35th Goya Awards | Best Sound | Coque Lahera, Nacho Royo-Villanova, Sergio Testón | Nominated | |
| 2021 | 35th Goya Awards | Best Special Effects | Raúl Romanillos, Jean-Louis Billard | Nominated | |
| 2021 | 11th Hollywood Music in Media Awards | Hollywood Music in Media Award for Best Original Score — Independent Film (Foreign Language) | Arturo Cardelús | Nominated | |

== See also ==
- List of Spanish films of 2020
