= Valérie Delpierre =

Monaco-born film producer

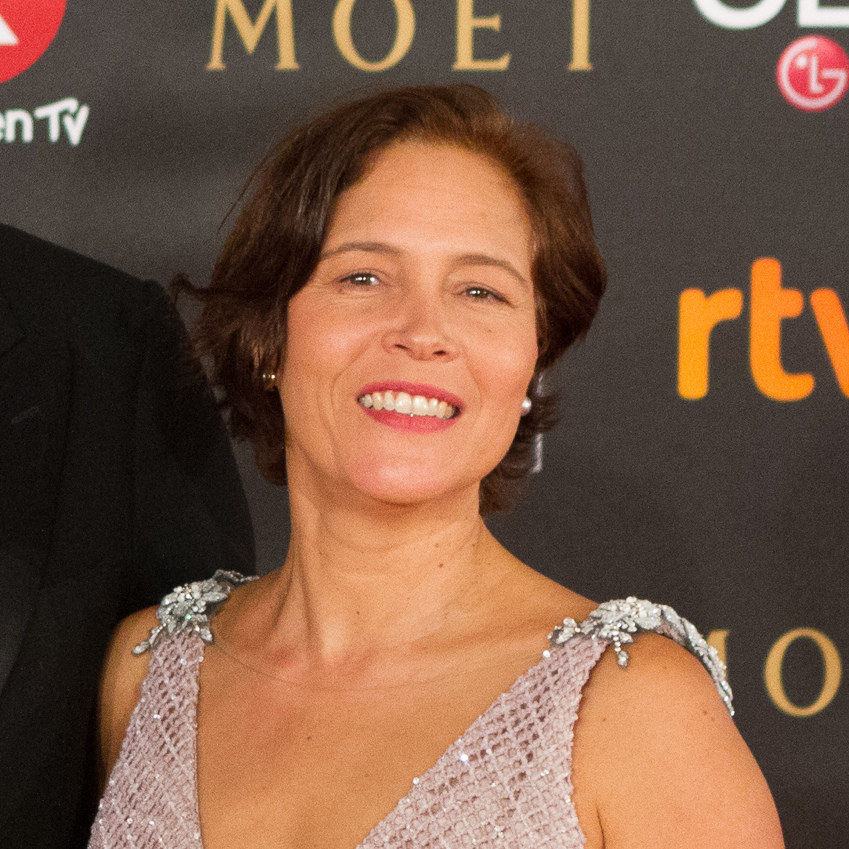
- c. 2017
- Born: Monaco
- Education: the Sorbonne; Complutense University of Madrid
- Occupation: film producer
- Known for: successful films

Valérie Delpierre is a Monaco-born film producer whose career has been in and around Spain . She produces films from her company Inicia Films. One of the films she produced took three Gaudí Awards for Best Film in a Non-Catalan Language, best novel Director and best Cinematography for 20,000 Species of Bees in 2024.

== Life ==
Delpierre was born in Monaco. She studied in Nice and at the Sorbonne and at the Complutense University of Madrid with an Erasmus scholarship (in International Relations). She started working in Spain teaching French before she was offered a job in the film industry. In 2006 she founded her own company, Inicia Films., which has created a range of films in terms of fact or fiction and language.

She produced a first film, B, by David Ilundain which won a 2016 Feroz Especial Award. Another debut film was Summer 1993. This was directed by Carla Simón and released in 2017. The film had been conceived by Simon while she was at the London Film School. She contacted Delpierre because she was in Spain and her proposed film was to be Catalan and set in Catalonia. The film was created with mainly non-professionals.

Delpierre worked in 2020 with the director Pilar Palomero on the film Las Niñas (Schoolgirls). Two years later film the Aragonese film La Maternal (Motherhood) was again directed by Palomero and the actors were not professionals because Palomero had found a group of girls who already had the complicity she wanted between the actors in the film.

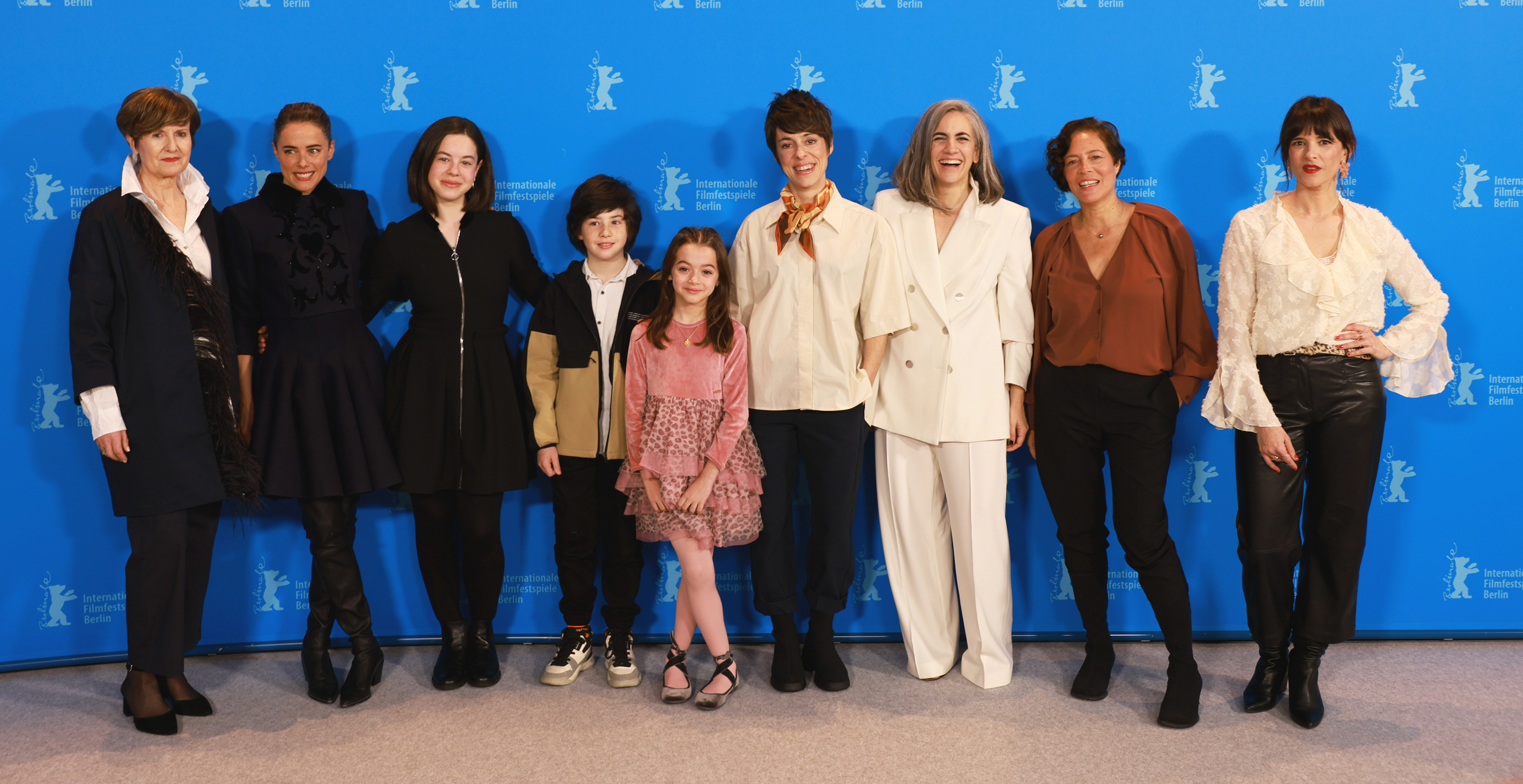
Child actress Sofía Otero with the 20,000 Species of Bees film crew and Delpierre at the Berlinale in 2023

20,000 Species of Bees by Estibaliz Urresola Solaguren was winner of the Best First Feature at the Berlinale and winner of three Goya Awards and four Feroz Awards. It also received a Silver Bear for Best Leading Performance for Sofía Otero at the Berlin Festival, the Biznagas for Best Film and Best Supporting Actress ( Patricia López Arnaiz ) at the Málaga Festival, and in At the 2024 Feroz Awards, it was highlighted as best dramatic film and López Arnaiz collected her third Feroz as best supporting actress.

Mariano Barroso had led the Academy of Cinematographic Arts and Sciences of Spain and Delpierre was on the board. In 2022 there was an election to find a successor to Barroso. The four candidates were actor Luisa Gavasa, cinematographer Teresa Medina, Fernando Méndez-Leite and Delpierre. The academaticians chose Fernando Méndez-Leite.

== Awards include ==
- 2017 Woman of the Year Award from the Fotogramas de Plata.
- 2018 Included in the list of Screen International's emerging producers
- 2021 Winner of the Feroz Award for Best Drama Film for Pilar Palomero's Schoolgirls, shared with Alex Lafuente
- 2023 Included among "The 40 most influential women in international cinema" by the American publication The Hollywood Reporter.
- 2024 Winner of the Feroz Award for Best Drama Film for 20,000 Species of Bees by Estibaliz Urresola Solaguren, shared with Lara Izagirre
- 2024 Winner of the Gaudí Awards for Best Film in a Non-Catalan Language, best new director and best cinematography for 20,000 Species of Bees, shared with Estibaliz Urresola Solaguren and Lara Izagirre; and Best Short Film for El bus, shared with Sandra Reina, Francisco Menchón and Jaume Fargas i Coll.
