= Raúl Arévalo =

Spanish film actor and director (born 1979)

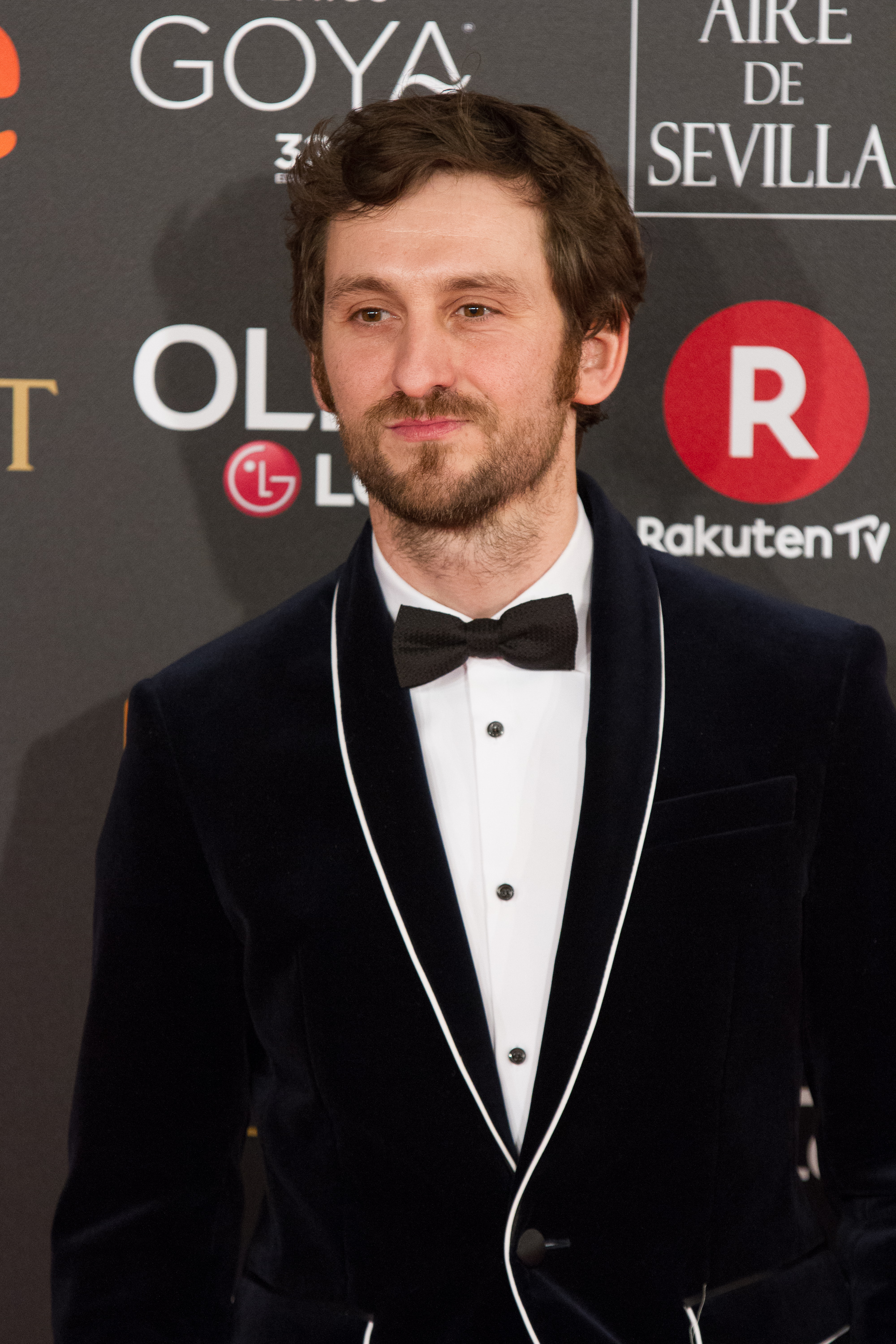
- Arévalo in 2018
- Born: Raúl Arévalo Zorzo; 22 November 1979 (age 46); Móstoles, Spain
- Occupations: Actor; director
- Years active: 2001–present
- Partner: Melina Matthews (since 2015)

Raúl Arévalo Zorzo (born 22 November 1979) is a Spanish actor and director. He has featured in films such as Dark Blue Almost Black (2006), Seven Billiard Tables (2007), The Blind Sunflowers (2008), Fat People (2009), Cousinhood (2011), I'm So Excited (2013), Marshland (2014), and The Europeans (2020) and television series such as La embajada (2016) and Riot Police (2020).

He made his full-length directorial debut with The Fury of a Patient Man (2016).

Arévalo is the recipient of multiple accolades, including three Goya Awards, three Actors and Actresses Union Awards, and two Feroz Awards.

== Life and career ==
Raúl Arévalo Zorzo was born on 22 November 1979 in Móstoles, province of Madrid. For his television debut, Arévalo joined the television series Compañeros while he was still a student under Cristina Rota. He was part of the cast of the series for two seasons (2001–2002).

In 2003, he made his feature film debut in With George Bush on My Mind, The following year, he appeared in Things That Make Living Worthwhile by Manuel Gómez Pereira.

Between 2003 and 2005, he made appearances in the TV series Hospital Central, Cuéntame cómo pasó, Aída and Motivos personales.

In 2006, he made his breakthrough performance as Israel, the lead character's best friend, in Dark Blue Almost Black, directed by Daniel Sánchez Arévalo. His work in this film earned him several awards. Later that year, he appeared on Antonio Banderas' second directorial effort Summer Rain, and in 2007 in the musical/comedy Scandalous and Seven Billiard Tables, with Maribel Verdú. He also worked with Verdú in The Blind Sunflowers in 2008, and in 2009, he appeared in Sánchez Arévalo's Fat People. For his performance in this film, he won a Goya Award for Best Supporting Actor.

He met actress Melina Matthews during the filming of Negotiator, and has been in a relationship with her since 2015.

In 2016, he made his directorial debut with The Fury of a Patient Man, for which he won a Goya Award for Best New Director and a Goya Award for Best Original Screenplay.

He has also appeared in several short films, including Traumalogy (Traumalogía, 2007), as well as many stage productions.

== Filmography ==
Key
†	Denotes films that have not yet been released

=== Film ===
Year	Title	Role	Notes	Ref.
2003	Los abajo firmantes (With George Bush on My Mind)	Hotel waiter	Feature film debut	
2004	Cosas que hacen que la vida valga la pena (Things That Make Living Worthwhile)	Vendedor ('salesman')		
2006	Azuloscurocasinegro (Dark Blue Almost Black)	Israel (aka "Sean")		
2006	El camino de los ingleses (Summer Rain)	Babirusa		
2006	Scandalous	Utrera		
2007	Tocar el cielo (Touch the Sky)	Fidel		
2007	Siete mesas de billar francés (Seven Billiard Tables)	Fele		
2008	8 citas (8 Dates)	Jesús		
2008	Che	Captured soldier #1		
2008	Los girasoles ciegos (The Blind Sunflowers)	Salvador		
2008	El patio de mi cárcel (My Prison Yard)	Poet		
2009	Gordos (Fat People)	Álex		
2010	Balada triste de trompeta (The Last Circus)	Carlos		
2010	También la lluvia (Even the Rain)	Juan / Montesinos		
2011	Primos (Cousinhood)	Julián		
2012	Promoción fantasma (Ghost Graduation)	Modesto		
2013	Los amantes pasajeros (I'm So Excited!)	Ulloa		
2013	La gran familia española (Family United)	Waiter		
2014	La vida inesperada (The Unexpected Life)	El Primo ('the cousin')		
2014	La isla mínima (Marshland)	Pedro Suárez		
2014	Negociador (Negotiator)	Rafa		
2014	Murieron por encima de sus posibilidades (Dying Beyond Their Means)	Miguel		
2014	El club de los incomprendidos (The Misfits Club)	Martín		
2015	Las ovejas no pierden el tren (Sidetracked)	Alberto		
2015	Hablar	El Cordero		
2016	Cien años de perdón (To Steal from a Thief)	Ferrán		
2016	Tarde para la ira (The Fury of a Patient Man)	—N/a	Director and co-writer	
2017	Oro (Gold)	Martín Dávila		
2018	El aviso (The Warning)	Jon		
2018	Memorias de un hombre en pijama (Memoirs of a Man in Pajamas)	Paco	Voice	
2018	Mi obra maestra (My Masterpiece)	Alex		
2018	Ola de crímenes (Crime Wave)	Taxista ('Taxi driver')		
2019	Dolor y gloria (Pain and Glory)	Venancio		
2019	El plan (The Plan)	Andrade		
2020	Black Beach	Carlos		
2020	Los europeos (The Europeans)	Miguel Alonso		
2021	Donde caben dos (More the Merrier)	Jaime		
2021	El lodo (Wetland)	Ricardo		
2022	Voy a pasármelo bien	David		
2024	The Room Next Door	Spanish Priest (Bernardo)		
2025	El cielo de los animales (The Heaven of Animals)	Diego		
2025	Voy a pasármelo mejor	David		
2025	Un fantasma en la batalla (She Walks in Darkness)	Arrieta		
2026	El ser querido (The Beloved)	César		

=== Television ===
Year	Title	Role	Notes	Ref.
2001–02	Compañeros	Carlos Medina	Main role (seasons 8–9)	
2003–04	Cuéntame cómo pasó	Basilio	3 episodes	
2003	Hospital Central	Manolo Téllez	Episode: "Vertido"	
2004	La sopa boba	Jimmy	6 episodes	
2005	Motivos personales	Marisa Pons' brother	Episode: "Las víctimas se multiplican"	
2006	Génesis: en la mente del asesino	Guillermo García	Episode: "Suicidas"	
2008	Soy el solitario	Carlos	Miniseries; 2 episodes	
2010	Aída	Charly	Episode: "En un momento candado"	
2012–14	Con el culo al aire	Jorge Ruiz	Main role	
2013–14	The Time in Between	Ignacio	5 episodes	
2015	Velvet	Víctor	8 episodes	
2016	La embajada	Eduardo Marañón	Main role	
2018	El Continental	Andrés	2 episodes	
2020	Riot Police	Diego López Rodero	Main role	
2021	Stories to Stay Awake	Javier	Episode: "La broma"	
2022	Santo	Miguel Millán		
2025	Anatomía de un instante (The Anatomy of a Moment)	Narrator	Voice only	
2025	Dime tu nombre	Rober		
2026	Por cien millones	Alfonso		

== Accolades ==
Year	Award	Category	Work	Result	Ref.
2007	16th Actors and Actresses Union Awards	Best New Actor	Dark Blue Almost Black	Won	
2008	22nd Goya Awards	Best Supporting Actor	Seven Billiard Tables	Nominated	
2008	17th Actors and Actresses Union Awards	Best Film Actor in a Secondary Role	Seven Billiard Tables	Won	
2009	23rd Goya Awards	Best Actor	The Blind Sunflowers	Nominated	
2009	18th Actors and Actresses Union Awards	Best Film Actor in a Leading Role	The Blind Sunflowers	Nominated	
2010	24th Goya Awards	Best Supporting Actor	Fat People	Won	
2010	19th Actors and Actresses Union Awards	Best Film Actor in a Secondary Role	Fat People	Nominated	
2012	26th Goya Awards	Best Supporting Actor	Cousinhood	Nominated	
2012	21st Actors and Actresses Union Awards	Best Film Actor in a Secondary Role	Cousinhood	Won	
2014	1st Feroz Awards	Best Supporting Actor in a Film	I'm So Excited	Nominated	
2015	20th Forqué Awards	Best Actor	Marshland	Nominated	
2015	2nd Feroz Awards	Best Main Actor in a Film	Marshland	Nominated	
2015	70th CEC Medals	Best Actor	Marshland	Nominated	
2015	29th Goya Awards	Best Actor	Marshland	Nominated	
2015	24th Actors and Actresses Union Awards	Best Film Actor in a Leading Role	Marshland	Nominated	
2017	4th Feroz Awards	Best Director	The Fury of a Patient Man	Won	
2017	4th Feroz Awards	Best Screenplay	The Fury of a Patient Man	Won	
2017	31st Goya Awards	Best New Director	The Fury of a Patient Man	Won	
2017	31st Goya Awards	Best Original Screenplay	The Fury of a Patient Man	Won	
2017	26th Actors and Actresses Union Awards	Best Television Actor in a Secondary Role	La embajada	Nominated	
2021	26th Forqué Awards	Best Actor in a Series	Riot Police	Nominated	
2021	8th Feroz Awards	Best Main Actor in a Film	The Europeans	Nominated	
2021	8th Feroz Awards	Best Main Actor in a Series	Riot Police	Nominated	
2021	76th CEC Medals	Best Actor	The Europeans	Nominated	
2022	30th Actors and Actresses Union Awards	Best Television Actor in a Leading Role	Riot Police	Nominated	
2026	32nd Forqué Awards	Best Actor in a Series	The Castle	Pending	
