= The People Upstairs (2020 film) =

2020 Spanish comedy film

- Film poster
- Spanish: Sentimental
- Directed by: Cesc Gay
- Screenplay by: Cesc Gay
- Based on: Los vecinos de arriba by Cesc Gay
- Produced by: Marta Esteban
- Starring: Javier Cámara; Griselda Siciliani; Belén Cuesta; Alberto San Juan
- Cinematography: Andreu Rebés
- Edited by: Liana Artigal
- Production companies: Imposible Films; Sentimentalfilm AIE
- Distributed by: Filmax
- Release dates: 24 September 2020 (Zinemaldia); 30 October 2020 (Spain)
- Running time: 82 minutes
- Country: Spain
- Language: Spanish
- Box office: $1,172,377

The People Upstairs (Spanish: Sentimental) is a 2020 Spanish comedy film written and directed by Cesc Gay based on his own play Els veïns de dalt. It stars Javier Cámara and Griselda Siciliani alongside Belén Cuesta and Alberto San Juan.

The film premiered at the Teatro Victoria Eugenia on 24 September 2020 as a part of the 68th San Sebastián International Film Festival ahead of its 30 October 2020 theatrical release in Spain by Filmax.

It won Best Supporting Actor (San Juan) at the 35th Goya Awards out of five nominations.

== Premise ==
Julio and Ana are a couple who spend most of their time arguing. One night, Ana decides to invite their upstairs neighbours, Salva and Laura, for dinner, even though Julio is not their biggest fan, not least because of the noise they make while having sex. As the night goes on, various secrets about the couple come to light.

== Cast ==
- Javier Cámara as Julio
- Griselda Siciliani as Ana
- Belén Cuesta as Laura
- Alberto San Juan as Salva

== Production ==
The People Upstairs is a screen adaptation of Cesc Gay's stage play Els veïns de dalt / Los vecinos de arriba. The film was produced by Imposible Films and Sentimentalfilm AIE and it had the participation of RTVE, Movistar+, and TVC. Filming began in Barcelona on 9 December 2019.

== Release ==
The film premiered at the Teatro Victoria Eugenia in a RTVE gala during the 68th San Sebastián International Film Festival on 24 September 2020. Distributed by Filmax, the film was released theatrically in Spain on 30 October 2020. Filmax also handled international sales.

== Reception ==
The People Upstairs holds a 100% approval rating on review aggregator website Rotten Tomatoes based on 9 reviews, with an average rating of 7.30/10.

Carlos Boyero of El País assessed that the film "looks and sounds good, I think it is fun".

Alfonso Rivera of Cineuropa wrote that the film "becomes a hilarious study in how to sour any social relation".

== Accolades ==
Year	Award	Category	Nominee(s)	Result	Ref.
2021	26th Forqué Awards	Best Actor	Javier Cámara	Won	
2021	76th CEC Awards	Best Adapted Screenplay	Cesc Gay	Won	
2021	76th CEC Awards	Best Actor	Javier Cámara	Nominated	
2021	8th Feroz Awards	Best Comedy Film		Nominated	
2021	8th Feroz Awards	Best Director	Cesc Gay	Nominated	
2021	8th Feroz Awards	Best Actor	Javier Cámara	Nominated	
2021	8th Feroz Awards	Best Supporting Actor	Alberto San Juan	Nominated	
2021	35th Goya Awards	Best Film		Nominated	
2021	35th Goya Awards	Best Adapted Screenplay	Cesc Gay	Nominated	
2021	35th Goya Awards	Best Actor	Javier Cámara	Nominated	
2021	35th Goya Awards	Best Supporting Actor	Alberto San Juan	Won	
2021	35th Goya Awards	Best New Actress	Griselda Siciliani	Nominated	
2021	13th Gaudí Awards	Best Non-Catalan Language Film		Nominated	
2021	13th Gaudí Awards	Best Director	Cesc Gay	Nominated	
2021	13th Gaudí Awards	Best Screenplay	Cesc Gay	Nominated	
2021	13th Gaudí Awards	Best Actor	Javier Cámara	Nominated	
2021	13th Gaudí Awards	Best Supporting Actor	Alberto San Juan	Won	
2021	13th Gaudí Awards	Best Art Direction	Anna Pujol	Nominated	
2021	13th Gaudí Awards	Best Costume Design	Anna Güell	Nominated	
2021	13th Gaudí Awards	Best Sound	Albert Gay, Irene Rausell, Yasmina Praderas	Nominated	
2021	34th European Film Awards	Best European Comedy		Nominated	

== Remakes ==
The film was remade in Italy as Vicini di Casa in 2022, in Switzerland as The Neighbours from Upstairs in 2023, in France as Maybe More in 2024, in the Czech Republic as V dobrém i zlém in 2024, in South Korea as The People Upstairs in 2025, and in the United States as The Invite. A Dutch/Belgian adaptation titled De bovenburen is scheduled to be released in 2027. A Portuguese adaptation of Los vecinos de arriba, O Pecado Mora em Cima, was released in 2026.

The filming of the Estonian, Latvian and Lithuanian adaptations of the film wrapped up on 22 September 2026. The Estonian version, Ettepanek (lit. 'The Proposal'), was directed by Arun Tamm. The Latvian version, Aicinājums (lit. 'The Invitation'), was directed by Dž. Dž. Džilindžers. The Lithuanian adaptation, Kaimynai iš viršaus (lit. 'The Upstairs Neighbours'), was directed by Mykolas Vildžiūnas.

== See also ==
- List of Spanish films of 2020
