= 35th Goya Awards =

- Date: 6 March 2021
- Site: Teatro del Soho CaixaBank, Málaga
- Hosted by: Antonio Banderas; María Casado
- Organized by: Academy of Cinematographic Arts and Sciences of Spain

Highlights
- Best Film: Schoolgirls
- Best Actor: Mario Casas; Cross the Line
- Best Actress: Patricia López Arnaiz; Ane Is Missing
- Most awards: Coven (5)
- Most nominations: Adú (13)

Television coverage
- Network: TVE
- Viewership: 2.48 million (15.6%)

The 35th Goya Awards ceremony, presented by the Academy of Cinematographic Arts and Sciences (AACCE), honored the best in Spanish films of 2020 and took place at the Teatro del Soho CaixaBank in Málaga on 6 March 2021. The ceremony was televised in Spain by Televisión Española (TVE) and was directed and hosted by actor Antonio Banderas and journalist María Casado. It was also televised for the international public by the TVE Internacional channel. It was the second consecutive year that the ceremony was held in Málaga. It was also the third consecutive year that the ceremony took place in Andalusia.

Due to the ongoing COVID-19 pandemic, the hosts, award presenters and music performers were present on-site, while the nominees appeared from remote locations.

Due to the impact of the COVID-19 pandemic on cinema, the eligibility criteria were modified to account for films that could not have a theatrical release and were released on streaming instead. Nominations were scheduled to be read in Madrid on 11 January 2021, but the announcement was postponed to January 18 due to the disruption caused by Storm Filomena. Nominations were read by actress and singer Ana Belén and actor and comedian Dani Rovira. Adú received the most nominations with thirteen, followed by Coven and Schoolgirls, with nine nominations a piece, and Rosa's Wedding, with eight nominations.

Schoolgirls won Best Film, as well as Best Original Screenplay, Best New Director, and Best Cinematography. Adú also won four awards, most notably Best Director and Best New Actor. Coven won the most awards, with five awards.

== Winners and nominees ==
Nominees are listed as follows. Winners are listed first, highlighted in boldface.

**Best Film**: **Schoolgirls**; Adú; Ane Is Missing; Rosa's Wedding; The People Upstairs	**Best Director**: **Salvador Calvo** – **Adú**; Juanma Bajo Ulloa – Baby; Icíar Bollaín – Rosa's Wedding; Isabel Coixet – It Snows in Benidorm
**Best Actor**: **Mario Casas** – **Cross the Line**; Javier Cámara – The People Upstairs; Ernesto Alterio – The Sea Beyond; David Verdaguer – One for All	**Best Actress**: **Patricia López Arnaiz** – **Ane Is Missing**; Amaia Aberasturi – Coven; Kiti Mánver – One Careful Owner; Candela Peña – Rosa's Wedding
**Best Supporting Actor**: **Alberto San Juan** – **The People Upstairs**; Álvaro Cervantes – Adú; Sergi López – Rosa's Wedding; Juan Diego Botto – The Europeans	**Best Supporting Actress**: **Nathalie Poza** – **Rosa's Wedding**; Juana Acosta – One Careful Owner; Verónica Echegui – My Heart Goes Boom!; Natalia de Molina – Schoolgirls
**Best New Actor**: **Adam Nourou** – **Adú**; Chema del Barco – The Plan; Janick – Unfortunate Stories; Fernando Valdivielso – Cross the Line	**Best New Actress**: **Jone Laspiur** – **Ane Is Missing**; Paula Usero – Rosa's Wedding; Milena Smit – Cross the Line; Griselda Siciliani – The People Upstairs
**Best Original Screenplay**: **Pilar Palomero** – **Schoolgirls**; Alejandro Hernández – Adú; Claro García, Javier Fesser – Unfortunate Stories; Alicia Luna, Icíar Bollaín – Rosa's Wedding	**Best Adapted Screenplay**: **David Pérez Sañudo**, **Marina Parés Pulido** – **Ane Is Missing**; Bernardo Sánchez, Marta Libertad Castillo – The Europeans; David Galán Galindo, Fernando Navarro – Unknown Origins; Cesc Gay – The People Upstairs
**Best Ibero-American Film**: **Forgotten We'll Be** · Colombia; The Mole Agent · Chile; La Llorona · Guatemala; I'm No Longer Here · Mexico	**Best European Film**: **The Father**; Corpus Christi; An Officer and a Spy; Falling
**Best New Director**: **Pilar Palomero** – **Schoolgirls**; David Pérez Sañudo – Ane Is Missing; Bernabé Rico – One Careful Owner; Núria Giménez Lorang – My Mexican Bretzel	**Best Animated Film**: **Turu, the Wacky Hen**
**Best Cinematography**: **Daniela Cajías** – **Schoolgirls**; Sergi Vilanova – Adú; Javier Agirre – Coven; Ángel Amorós – Black Beach	**Best Editing**: **Sergio Jiménez** – **The Year of the Discovery**; Jaime Colis – Adú; Fernando Franco, Miguel Doblado – Black Beach; Sofi Escudé – Schoolgirls
**Best Art Direction**: **Mikel Serrano** – **Coven**; César Macarrón – Adú; Montse Sanz – Black Beach; Mónica Bernuy – Schoolgirls	**Best Production Supervision**: **Ana Parra**, **Luis Fernández Lago** – **Adú**; Guadalupe Balaguer Trelles – Coven; Carmen Martínez Muñoz – Black Beach; Toni Novella – It Snows in Benidorm
**Best Sound**: **Eduardo Esquide**, **Jamaica Ruíz García**, **Juan Ferro**, **Nicolas de Poulpiquet** – **Adú**; Urko Garai, Josefina Rodriguez, Frédéric Hamelin, Leandro de Loredo – Coven; Coque Lahera, Nacho Royo-Villanova, Sergio Testón – Black Beach; Mar González, Francesco Lucarelli, Nacho Royo-Villanova – The Plan	**Best Special Effects**: **Mariano García Marty**, **Ana Rubio** – **Coven**; Raúl Romanillos, Jean-Louis Billiard – Black Beach; Raúl Romanillos, Míriam Piquer – Unfortunate Stories; Lluis Rivera Jove, Helmuth Barnert – Unknown Origins
**Best Costume Design**: **Nerea Torrijos** – **Coven**; Cristina Rodríguez – My Heart Goes Boom!; Arantxa Ezquerro – Schoolgirls; Lena Mossum – The Europeans	**Best Makeup and Hairstyles**: **Beata Wotjowicz**, **Ricardo Molina** – **Coven**; Elena Cuevas, Mara Collazo, Sergio López – Adú; Milu Cabrer, Benjamín Pérez – My Heart Goes Boom!; Paula Cruz, Jesús Guerra, Nacho Díaz – Unknown Origins
**Best Original Score**: **Aránzazu Calleja**, **Maite Arroitajauregi** – **Coven**; Roque Baños – Adú; Bingen Mendizabal, Koldo Uriarte – Baby; Federico Jusid – The Summer We Lived	**Best Original Song**: **"Que no, que no" by María Rozalén – Rosa's Wedding**; "Sababoo" by Cherif Badua and Roque Baños – Adú; "El verano que vivimos" by Alejandro Sanz and Alfonso Pérez Arias – The Summer We Lived; "Lunas de papel" by Carlos Naya – Schoolgirls
**Best Fictional Short Film**: **A la cara**; 16 de decembro; Beef; Gastos incluidos; Lo efímero	**Best Animated Short Film**: **Blue & Malone: Casos Imposibles**; Homeless Home; Metamorphosis; Vuela
**Best Documentary Film**: **The Year of the Discovery**; Anatomía de un dandy; Drowning Letters; My Mexican Bretzel	**Best Documentary Short Film**: **Biografía del cadáver de una mujer**; Paraíso; Paraíso en llamas; Sólo con peces

=== Honorary Goya ===
- **Ángela Molina**

=== Films with multiple nominations and awards ===
Films with multiple nominations
Nominations	Film
13	Adú
9	Coven
9	Schoolgirls
8	Rosa's Wedding
6	Black Beach
5	Ane Is Missing
5	The People Upstairs
3	Cross the Line
3	My Heart Goes Boom!
3	One Careful Owner
3	The Europeans
3	Unfortunate Stories
3	Unknown Origins
2	Baby
2	The Summer We Lived
2	It Snows in Benidorm
2	My Mexican Bretzel
2	The Plan
2	The Year of the Discovery

Films with multiple awards
Awards	Film
5	Coven
4	Adú
4	Schoolgirls
3	Ane Is Missing
2	Rosa's Wedding
2	The Year of the Discovery

== Presenters and performers ==
The following individuals, listed in order of appearance, presented awards or performed musical numbers.

=== Presenters ===
- Pedro Almodóvar – presented Best Costume Design
- Penélope Cruz – presented Best Makeup and Hairstyles
- Alejandro Amenábar – presented Best Sound
- Paz Vega – presented Best Special Effects
- J. A. Bayona – presented Best Production Supervision
- Belén Cuesta – presented Best New Actress
- Antonio de la Torre – presented Best New Actor
- María Barranco – presented Best New Director
- Najwa Nimri – presented Best Original Song
- Leonardo Sbaraglia – presented Best Original Score
- Carlos Areces – presented Best Fictional Short Film
- Julián López – presented Best Documentary Short Film
- Adrián Lastra – presented Best Animated Short Film
- Hiba Abouk – presented Best Cinematography
- Maggie Civantos – presented Best Editing
- Marta Etura – presented Best Art Direction
- Natalia Verbeke – presented Best Original Screenplay
- Tristán Ulloa – presented Best Adapted Screenplay
- Daniela Santiago – presented Best Documentary Film
- Jon Kortajarena – presented Best Animated Film
- Marta Nieto – presented Best Supporting Actress
- Antonio Velázquez – presented Best Supporting Actor
- Mónica Randall and Verónica Forqué – presented Best Spanish Language Foreign Film
- Elena Irureta and Pedro Casablanc – presented Best European Film
- Jaime Chávarri – presented the Honorary Goya Award to Ángela Molina
- Emma Suárez and Marisa Paredes – presented Best Actress
- Roberto Álamo and José Coronado – presented Best Actor
- Chus Gutiérrez and Gracia Querejeta – presented Best Director
- Ana María Ruiz (nurse) – presented Best Film

=== Performers ===
Artist	Featuring	Performed
Nathy Peluso	Orquesta Sinfónica de Málaga	"La Violetera"
Vanesa Martín	Orquesta Sinfónica de Málaga	"Una nube blanca" during the annual "In Memoriam" tribute
Diana Navarro	Carlos Latre; Orquesta Sinfónica de Málaga	"Coplilla de las divisas" as part of a tribute to Luis García Berlanga
Aitana	Orquesta Sinfónica de Málaga	"Happy Days Are Here Again"
