= The Plan (2019 film) =

- Theatrical release poster
- Spanish: El plan
- Directed by: Polo Menárguez
- Screenplay by: Polo Menárguez; Ignasi Vidal
- Based on: El plan (play) by Ignasi Vidal
- Produced by: Nacho La Casa
- Starring: Raúl Arévalo; Chema del Barco; Antonio de la Torre
- Cinematography: Alejandro Espadero
- Edited by: Vanessa Marimbert
- Music by: Pablo Martín-Caminero
- Production company: Capitán Araña
- Distributed by: Filmax
- Release dates: 22 October 2019 (Seminci); 21 February 2020 (Spain)
- Country: Spain
- Language: Spanish

The Plan (Spanish: El plan) is a 2019 Spanish black comedy film directed by Polo Menárguez based on the play by Ignasi Vidal starring Antonio de la Torre, Raúl Arévalo, and Chema del Barco. It deals with themes such as failure, miscommunication, and toxic masculinity.

== Plot ==
In a hot Summer morning in Usera, three buddies and unemployed security guards (Paco, Ramón, and Andrade) arrange a meeting at the house of one of them to carry out a plan for a mysterious activity, but circumstances delay their departure from the apartment.

== Cast ==
- Antonio de la Torre as Paco
- Chema del Barco as Ramón
- Raúl Arévalo as Andrade

== Production ==
The film is a Capitán Araña (Nacho La Casa) production. Based on the play by Ignasi Vidal, the film sees the return of one of the play's stage actors, Chema del Barco. Shooting started in February 2019 in Madrid. The film was lensed by Alejandro Espadero using a Panasonic Varicam.

== Release ==
The Plan premiered on 22 October 2019 at the 64th Valladolid International Film Festival. It also screened at the 16th Seville European Film Festival on 12 November 2019. Distributed by Filmax, it was released theatrically in Spain on 21 February 2020.

== Reception ==
Juan Pando of Fotogramas rated the film 3 out of 5 stars, highlighting the performance of the lead trio as the best thing about the film.

Javier Ocaña of El País deemed the film to be a "pitch-black comedy with social undertones and deep-rooted themes" and "a journey into the social and mental abyss of three ordinary men".

Sergio F. Pinilla of Cinemanía rated the film 4 out of 5 stars, declaring it "hilarious, tremendous and topical".

== Accolades ==
Year	Award	Category	Nominee(s)	Result	Ref.
2021	8th Feroz Awards	Best Supporting Actor in a Film	Chema del Barco	Nominated	
2021	8th Feroz Awards	Special Award		Nominated	
2021	35th Goya Awards	Best New Actor	Chema del Barco	Nominated	
2021	35th Goya Awards	Best Sound	Mar González, Francesco Lucarelli, Nacho Royo-Villanova	Nominated	

== See also ==
- List of Spanish films of 2020
