= Unknown Origins =

2020 Spanish film

- Film poster
- Spanish: Orígenes secretos
- Directed by: David Galán Galindo
- Screenplay by: David Galán Galindo; Fernando Navarro
- Based on: Orígenes secretos by David Galán Galindo
- Starring: Javier Rey; Verónica Echegui; Brays Efe; Antonio Resines
- Cinematography: Rita Noriega
- Edited by: Leire Alonso; Martí Roca
- Music by: Federico Jusid
- Production companies: In Post We Trust; La Chica de la Curva; Nadie es Perfecto
- Distributed by: Netflix
- Release date: August 28, 2020
- Running time: 100 minutes
- Country: Spain
- Language: Spanish

Unknown Origins (Spanish: Orígenes secretos) is a 2020 Spanish thriller film directed by David Galán Galindo, written by David Galán Galindo and Fernando Navarro, based on Galindo's novel of the same name, and starring Javier Rey, Verónica Echegui and Brays Efe alongside Antonio Resines.

== Plot ==
Set in Madrid in 2019, the plot sees a psychotic character using comics and superheroes' origin stories to kill people and leaves a mark. One man is killed after being fed enough supplements and steroids to be the Hulk. Another has his heart plucked out and is covered in a metallic suit.

Attempting to stop this is Inspector David, a man who feels comics are for overgrown adults and quickly pays the price for that sort of criticism. Initially, he is assisted by Cosme, a cop spending his final days on the force after being forced to turn in his resignation. David's boss is the homicide chief (Norma), who loves cosplaying. In her words, she doesn't read comics, rather she watches movies and anime.

Joining the duo is Jorge Elías, Cosme's son. He is a comic geek and runs a comic book store in the city. When Cosme realizes the demented villain commits murders in the form of creating superhero origin stories, he feels Jorge is better suited to work the case with David.

Things escalate when David realizes his parents were killed the same way as Martha and Thomas Wayne were killed in the comics. Jorge, David, and Norma go up against a secret killer who is ahead of them the whole time. With time running out for the trio to find the killer, they face pressure as the news goes public. Bruguera, the forensic man in the department, is eventually revealed to be the killer and the rest of the story follows the trio attempting to put an end to his nefarious plans.

== Cast ==
- Javier Rey as David Valentin
- Antonio Resines as Cosme
- Brays Efe as Jorge Elías
- Verónica Echegui as Norma
- Ernesto Alterio as Jonathan Bruguera
- Leonardo Sbaraglia as Paco
- Álex García as Javier
- Carlos Areces as Galván
- Roman Rymar as Felipe
- Fran Bleu as Víctor Vid

== Release ==
The film was scheduled to show at the 2020 Málaga Film Festival, but filmmakers pulled it from the schedule when the festival dates changed from March to August. It was released on August 28, 2020 on Netflix.

== Accolades ==
Year	Award	Category	Nominee(s)	Result	Ref.
2021	8th Feroz Awards	Best Comedy Film		Nominated	
2021	35th Goya Awards	Best Adapted Screenplay	David Galán Galindo, Fernando Navarro	Nominated	
2021	35th Goya Awards	Best Makeup and Hairstyles	Paula Cruz, Jesús Guerra, Nacho Díaz	Nominated	
2021	35th Goya Awards	Best Special Effects	Lluis Rivera Jove, Helmuth Barnert	Nominated	

== See also ==
- List of Spanish films of 2020
