= Schoolgirls (film) =

- Film poster
- Spanish: Las niñas
- Directed by: Pilar Palomero
- Written by: Pilar Palomero
- Produced by: Valérie Delpierre; Alex Lafuente
- Starring: Andrea Fandos; Natalia de Molina
- Cinematography: Daniela Cajías
- Edited by: Sofia Escudé
- Music by: Carlos Naya
- Production companies: Inicia Films; BTeam Prods
- Distributed by: BTeam Pictures
- Release dates: 23 February 2020 (Berlinale); 4 September 2020 (Spain)
- Running time: 97 minutes
- Country: Spain
- Language: Spanish
- Budget: €1.2 million
- Box office: €0.6 million

Schoolgirls (also known as The Girls; Spanish: Las niñas) is a 2020 Spanish coming-of-age drama film written and directed by Pilar Palomero, starring Andrea Fandos and Natalia de Molina.

The film had its world premiere at the 70th Berlin International Film Festival on 23 February 2020 ahead of its screening at the 23rd Málaga Film Festival, where it won the Golden Biznaga. It was released theatrically in Spain on 4 September 2020 by BTeam Pictures. It won four Best Picture, Best New Director, Best Original Screenplay and Best Cinematography at the 35th Goya Awards.

== Plot ==
Celia, an 11-year-old girl, studies at a nuns' school in Zaragoza in 1992. Celia is a good girl: a responsible student and a considerate daughter. The arrival of a new classmate opens a small window through which Celia discovers a whole new world. Together with her new friend and some older girls, Celia enters a new stage of her life: adolescence, a period of firsts. She feels the need to experiment, try new things, and stop being a little girl, even if that entails confronting her mother and everything that once meant comfort and security.

== Cast ==
- Andrea Fandos as Celia
- Natalia de Molina as Adela
- Zoe Arnao as Brisa
- Julia Sierra as Cristina
- Francesca Piñón as Madre Consuelo
- Ainara Nieto as Clara
- Elisa Martínez as Leyre
- Carlota Gurpegui as Vanessa

== Production ==
The film is an Inicia Films (Valérie Delpierre) and BTeam Prods (Alex Lafuente) production, with the participation of RTVE, TVC, Televisión de Aragón, and Movistar+, and backing from ICAA and ICEC. It boasted a €1.2 million budget.

== Release ==
The film premiered in the 'Generation K Plus' section of the 70th Berlin International Film Festival in February 2020. Its festival run also included screenings at the Brussels International Film Festival (winning the Jury Prize in Directors' Week), and the 23rd Málaga Film Festival (winning the Golden Biznaga). Distributed by BTeam Pictures, Schoolgirls was released theatrically in Spain on 4 September 2020.

== Reception ==
Schoolgirls holds a 90% approval rating on review aggregator website Rotten Tomatoes based on 10 reviews, with an average rating of 8.1/10.

Jonathan Holland of The Hollywood Reporter summed Schoolgirls up in his bottom line as "Puberty and Prejudice", aligning the film as belonging to the "school-child-focused strain of quality Spanish cinema that stretches back as far as The Spirit of the Beehive".

== Accolades ==
Year	Award	Category	Nominee(s)	Result	Ref.
2020	23rd Málaga Film Festival	Golden Biznaga for Best Spanish Film		Won	
2020	23rd Málaga Film Festival	Silver Biznaga for Best Cinematography	Daniela Cajías	Won	
2020	23rd Málaga Film Festival	Feroz Puerta Oscura Award		Won	
2021	26th Forqué Awards	Best Fiction Picture		Won	
2021	26th Forqué Awards	Best Actress	Andrea Fandos	Nominated	
2021	26th Forqué Awards	Cinema and Education in Values		Nominated	
2021	8th Feroz Awards	Best Drama Film		Won	
2021	8th Feroz Awards	Best Trailer	Marina Francisco, Juan Gabriel García Román	Nominated	
2021	8th Feroz Awards	Best Director	Pilar Palomero	Won	
2021	8th Feroz Awards	Best Screenplay	Pilar Palomero	Won	
2021	8th Feroz Awards	Best Main Actress in a Film	Andrea Fandos	Nominated	
2021	8th Feroz Awards	Best Supporting Actress in a Film	Natalia de Molina	Nominated	
2021	35th Goya Awards	Best Film		Won	
2021	35th Goya Awards	Best New Director	Pilar Palomero	Won	
2021	35th Goya Awards	Best Original Screenplay	Pilar Palomero	Won	
2021	35th Goya Awards	Best Supporting Actress	Natalia de Molina	Nominated	
2021	35th Goya Awards	Best Cinematography	Daniela Cajías	Won	
2021	35th Goya Awards	Best Editing	Sofia Escudé	Nominated	
2021	35th Goya Awards	Best Art Direction	Mónica Bernuy	Nominated	
2021	35th Goya Awards	Best Costume Design	Arantxa Ezquerro	Nominated	
2021	35th Goya Awards	Best Original Song	"Lunas de papel" by Carlos Naya	Nominated	
2021	63rd Ariel Awards	Best Ibero-American Film		Nominated	
2021	8th Platino Awards	Best Ibero-American Film		Nominated	
2021	8th Platino Awards	Best Ibero-American Debut Film	Pilar Palomero	Won	
2021	8th Platino Awards	Best Screenplay	Pilar Palomero	Nominated	
2021	8th Platino Awards	Best Cinematography	Daniela Cajías	Nominated	
2021	8th Platino Awards	Best Editing	Sofia Escudé	Nominated	
2021	8th Platino Awards	Best Art Direction	Mónica Bernuy	Nominated	

== See also ==
- List of Spanish films of 2020
