= The Year of the Discovery =

Film

- Film poster
- Spanish: El año del descubrimiento
- Directed by: Luis López Carrasco
- Written by: Raúl Liarte; Luis López Carrasco
- Produced by: Pedro Palacios; Daniel M. Caneiro; Ricard Sales; Marta Lacima; Luis Ferrón; Luis López Carrasco; Javier Fernández
- Cinematography: Sara Gallego Grau
- Edited by: Sergio Jiménez Barranquero
- Release dates: 25 January 2020 (IFFR); 13 November 2020 (Spain)
- Running time: 200 minutes
- Countries: Spain; Switzerland
- Language: Spanish

The Year of the Discovery (Spanish: El año del descubrimiento) is a 2020 Spanish documentary film directed by Luis López Carrasco. The documentary focuses on the social protests that took place in Cartagena in 1992, a struggle of the working class in the context of the implementation of industrial restructuring policies that affected thousands of workers in the Region of Murcia after the collapse of companies such as Bazán, Peñarroya and Fesa-Enfersa, dedicated to shipbuilding and chemical and metal industry.

The film won two Goya Awards, Best Documentary Film and Best Editing, out of two nominations at the 35th Goya Awards. At the 8th Feroz Awards, the film won Best Documentary Film, from a total of four nominations.

== Reception ==
The Year of the Discovery received positive reviews from film critics. It holds a 100% approval rating on review aggregator website Rotten Tomatoes based on seven reviews, with an average rating of 9.5/10.

== Awards ==
Awards	Category	Nominated	Result
Forqué Awards	Best Documentary Film		Won
Goya Awards	Best Documentary Film		Won
Goya Awards	Best Editing	Sergio Jiménez	Won
Premios Feroz	Best Drama Film		Nominated
Premios Feroz	Best Documentary Film		Won
Premios Feroz	Best Director	Luis López Carrasco	Nominated
Premios Feroz	Best Screenplay	Raúl Liarte and Luis López Carrasco	Nominated
Platino Awards	Best Documentary Film		Nominated
