= José Ramón Soroiz =

Spanish actor (born 1951)

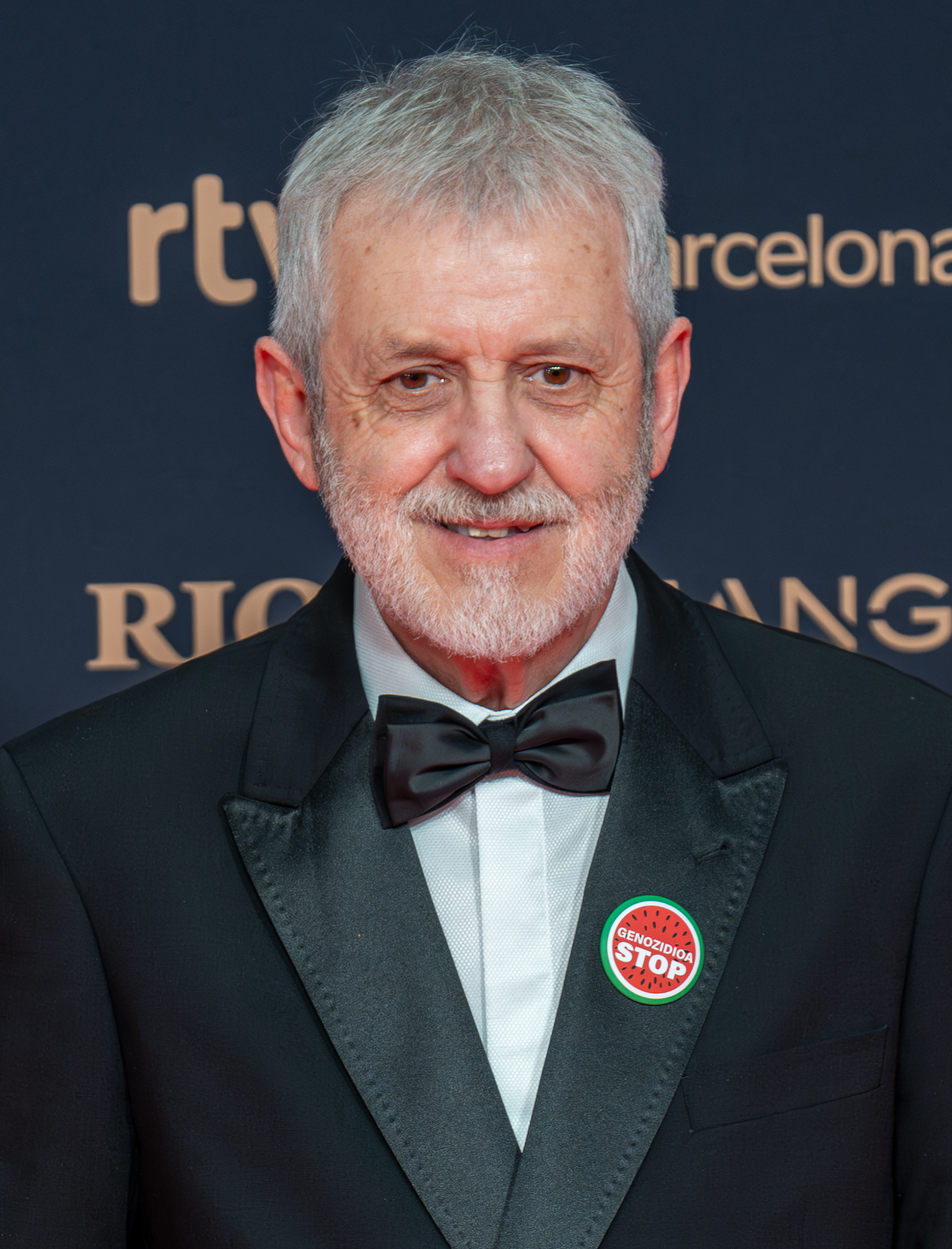
- Soroiz in 2026
- Born: 24 February 1951 (age 75); Legorreta, Spain
- Occupation: Actor

José Ramón Soroiz Ormazabal (born 24 February 1951) is a Basque stage and screen actor. He won the Silver Shell for Best Leading Performance and the Goya Award for Best Actor for Maspalomas (2025).

== Life and career ==
José Ramón Soroiz Ormazabal was born in Legorreta on 24 February 1951. After developing an early career primarily in Basque theatre plays in the 1980s and 1990s, he went on to featured in multiple television shows aired on the Basque public broadcaster ETB, including his performance as Jose Lontxo in the sitcom Bi eta bat for which he gained wide visibility to the Basque audience. He starred as Txato in the HBO miniseries Patria.

His film work include appearances in Cows (1992), Flowers (2014), and Lullaby (2022). For his leading role as a gay man in his 70s going back into the closet in Maspalomas (2025), he won the Silver Shell, a Forqué Award, a Feroz Award, and the Goya Award for Best Actor.
