= Rosa's Wedding =

- Film poster
- Spanish: La boda de Rosa
- Directed by: Icíar Bollaín
- Written by: Icíar Bollaín; Alicia Luna
- Produced by: Lina Badenes; Fernanda Del Nido; Cristina Zumárraga
- Starring: Candela Peña; Sergi López; Nathalie Poza; Ramón Barea; Paula Usero
- Cinematography: Sergi Gallardo; Beatriz Sastre
- Edited by: Nacho Ruiz Capillas
- Music by: Vanessa Garde
- Release date: 21 August 2020 (Málaga)
- Running time: 97 minutes
- Country: Spain
- Language: Spanish

Rosa's Wedding (Spanish: La boda de Rosa) is a 2020 Spanish comedy film directed by Icíar Bollaín, starring Candela Peña and Sergi López.

The film was nominated for eight Goya Awards and nine Feroz Awards.

== Plot ==
Rosa, about to turn 45, combines her job as a movie seamstress with the pressure of helping her demanding family. She reaches breaking point and realises she has always lived her life to serve everyone else. Desperate, she is compelled to take the sudden decision to leave everything behind and focus on herself. She plans to symbolically marry herself, and pursue her dream of starting her own business. However, many obstacles, including her father, siblings and daughter, stand in the way of her joining herself in holy matrimony and beginning to live her life.

== Cast ==
- Candela Peña as Rosa
- Sergi López as Armando
- Nathalie Poza as Violeta
- Ramón Barea as Antonio
- Paula Usero as Lidia

== Reception ==
Rosa's Wedding received positive reviews from film critics. It holds a 100% approval rating on review aggregator website Rotten Tomatoes based on 12 reviews, with an average rating of 7.4/10.

== Awards ==
| Awards | Category | Nominated | Result |
|---|---|---|---|
| Goya Awards | Best Film | | Nominated |
| Goya Awards | Best Director | Icíar Bollaín | Nominated |
| Goya Awards | Best Original Screenplay | Icíar Bollaín and Alicia Luna | Nominated |
| Goya Awards | Best Actress | Candela Peña | Nominated |
| Goya Awards | Best Supporting Actor | Sergi López | Nominated |
| Goya Awards | Best Supporting Actress | Nathalie Poza | Won |
| Goya Awards | Best New Actress | Paula Usero | Nominated |
| Goya Awards | Best Original Song | "Que no, que no" by María Rozalén | Won |
| Feroz Awards | Best Comedy Film | | Won |
| Feroz Awards | Best Trailer | | Nominated |
| Feroz Awards | Best Director | Icíar Bollaín | Nominated |
| Feroz Awards | Best Screenplay | Icíar Bollaín and Alicia Luna | Nominated |
| Feroz Awards | Best Main Actress in a Film | Candela Peña | Nominated |
| Feroz Awards | Best Supporting Actor in a Film | Ramón Barea | Nominated |
| Feroz Awards | Best Supporting Actor in a Film | Sergi López | Nominated |
| Feroz Awards | Best Supporting Actress in a Film | Nathalie Poza | Nominated |
| Feroz Awards | Best Supporting Actress in a Film | Paula Usero | Nominated |
| Platino Awards | Best Director | Icíar Bollaín | Nominated |
| Platino Awards | Best Actress | Candela Peña | Won |
| Platino Awards | Best Supporting Actress | Nathalie Poza | Won |
