= Pilar Palomero =

Spanish film director

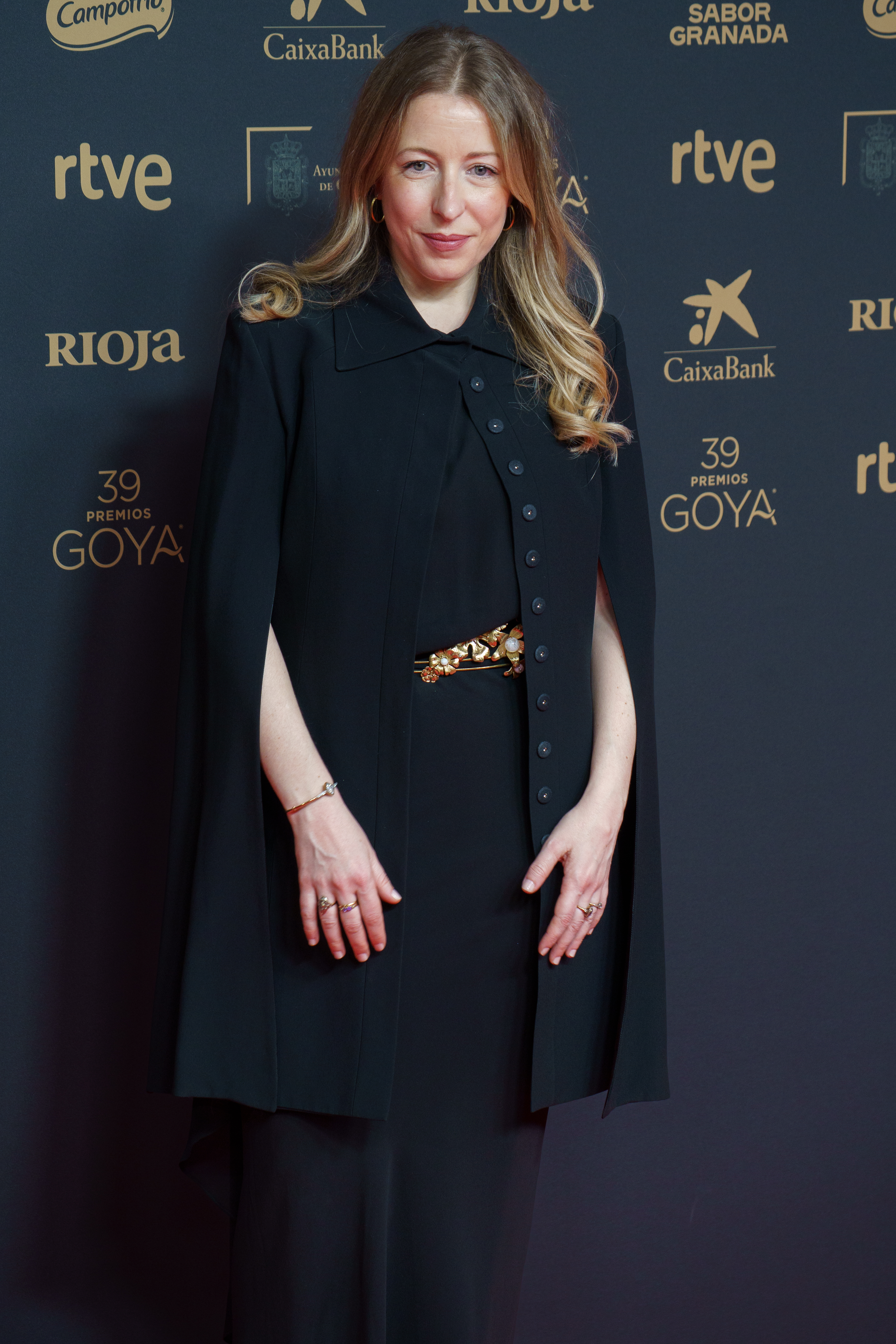
- Palomero in 2025
- Born: 1980 (age 44–45); Zaragoza, Spain
- Occupation(s): Director, screenwriter

Pilar Palomero (born 1980) is a Spanish film director and screenwriter.

== Biography ==
Born in Zaragoza in 1980, she has worked as camera operator, assistant, electrician, cinematographer, script editor, editor, scriptwriter and director. She studied at the University of Zaragoza and at the ECAM, where she earned a degree as cinematography director in 2006.

After her debut as director in Sonrisas (2005 short film), she directed other short films such as Niño Balcón and Chan Chán.

Palomero's directorial debut in a feature film, the 2020 coming-of-age drama Schoolgirls, earned her two Feroz Awards (Best Direction & Best Screenplay) and two Goya Awards (Best New Director & Best Original Screenplay).

She shot her third feature, Glimmers, in late 2023.

In 2024 she received the Málaga Talent Award at the 27th Málaga Film Festival.

== Works ==
=== Director ===
Year	Title	Notes
2020	Schoolgirls	Also writer
2021	Letters from the Ends of the World	Omnibus, segment "To Those Who Miss"
2022	Venga Juan	Episode: "2009"
2022	Motherhood	Also writer
2024	Glimmers	Also writer

== Accolades ==
Year	Award	Category	Work	Result	Ref.
2021	8th Feroz Awards	Best Director	Schoolgirls	Won	
2021	8th Feroz Awards	Best Screenplay	Schoolgirls	Won	
2021	35th Goya Awards	Best New Director	Schoolgirls	Won	
2021	35th Goya Awards	Best Original Screenplay	Schoolgirls	Won	
2021	13th Gaudí Awards	Best Director	Schoolgirls	Won	
2021	ALMA Awards	Best Screenplay (Drama Feature Film )	Schoolgirls	Won	
2023	15th Gaudí Awards	Best Director	Motherhood	Nominated	
2023	15th Gaudí Awards	Best Original Screenplay	Motherhood	Nominated	
2023	10th Feroz Awards	Best Director	Motherhood	Nominated	
2023	37th Goya Awards	Best Director	Motherhood	Nominated	
2025	17th Gaudí Awards	Best Adapted Screenplay	Glimmers	Nominated	
2025	39th Goya Awards	Best Adapted Screenplay	Glimmers	Nominated	
