= One Careful Owner =

2020 Spanish comedy film

- Film poster
- Spanish: El inconveniente
- Directed by: Bernabé Rico
- Written by: Bernabé Rico; Juan Carlos Rubio
- Produced by: Olmo Figueredo González-Quevedo
- Starring: Kiti Mánver; Juana Acosta; Carlos Areces; José Sacristán
- Cinematography: Rita Noriega
- Music by: Julio Awad
- Production companies: La Claqueta PC; Talycual Producciones; El inconveniente AIE; La Cruda Realidad
- Release dates: 24 August 2020 (Málaga); 18 December 2020 (Spain)
- Running time: 94 minutes
- Country: Spain
- Language: Spanish

One Careful Owner (Spanish: El inconveniente) is a 2020 Spanish comedy film directed by Bernabé Rico, starring Kiti Mánver and Juana Acosta.

The film was nominated for three Goya Awards and two Feroz Awards. It was produced by La Claqueta PC and Talycual Producciones alongside El inconveniente AIE and La Cruda Realidad, with participation of Canal Sur Radio y Televisión and RTVE.

== Plot ==
Sara is a successful career woman, working for a life insurance company. She has been married to Daniel (Daniel Grao) for eight years. No longer believing in the future of her marriage, she looks for her own apartment.

The inexperienced estate agent Óscar introduces her to a beautiful apartment in the center of Seville, which is offered for an unusually low price. The apartment comes with one inconvenient condition: Sara can only move in when the current owner Lola dies.

Sara meets Lola, who turns out to be an articulate and chain-smoking survivor of a triple bypass. An unusual friendship develops between the conservative career woman and the free-spirited older lady.

== Cast ==
- Kiti Mánver as Lola
- Juana Acosta as Sara
- Carlos Areces as Óscar
- Daniel Grao as Daniel
- José Sacristán as Víctor

== Awards ==
Awards	Category	Nominated	Result
Goya Awards	Best New Director	Bernabé Rico	Nominated
Goya Awards	Best Actress	Kiti Mánver	Nominated
Goya Awards	Best Supporting Actress	Juana Acosta	Nominated
Feroz Awards	Best Main Actress in a Film	Kiti Mánver	Nominated
Feroz Awards	Best Supporting Actress in a Film	Juana Acosta	Nominated
