= Luis López Carrasco =

Spanish filmmaker and writer

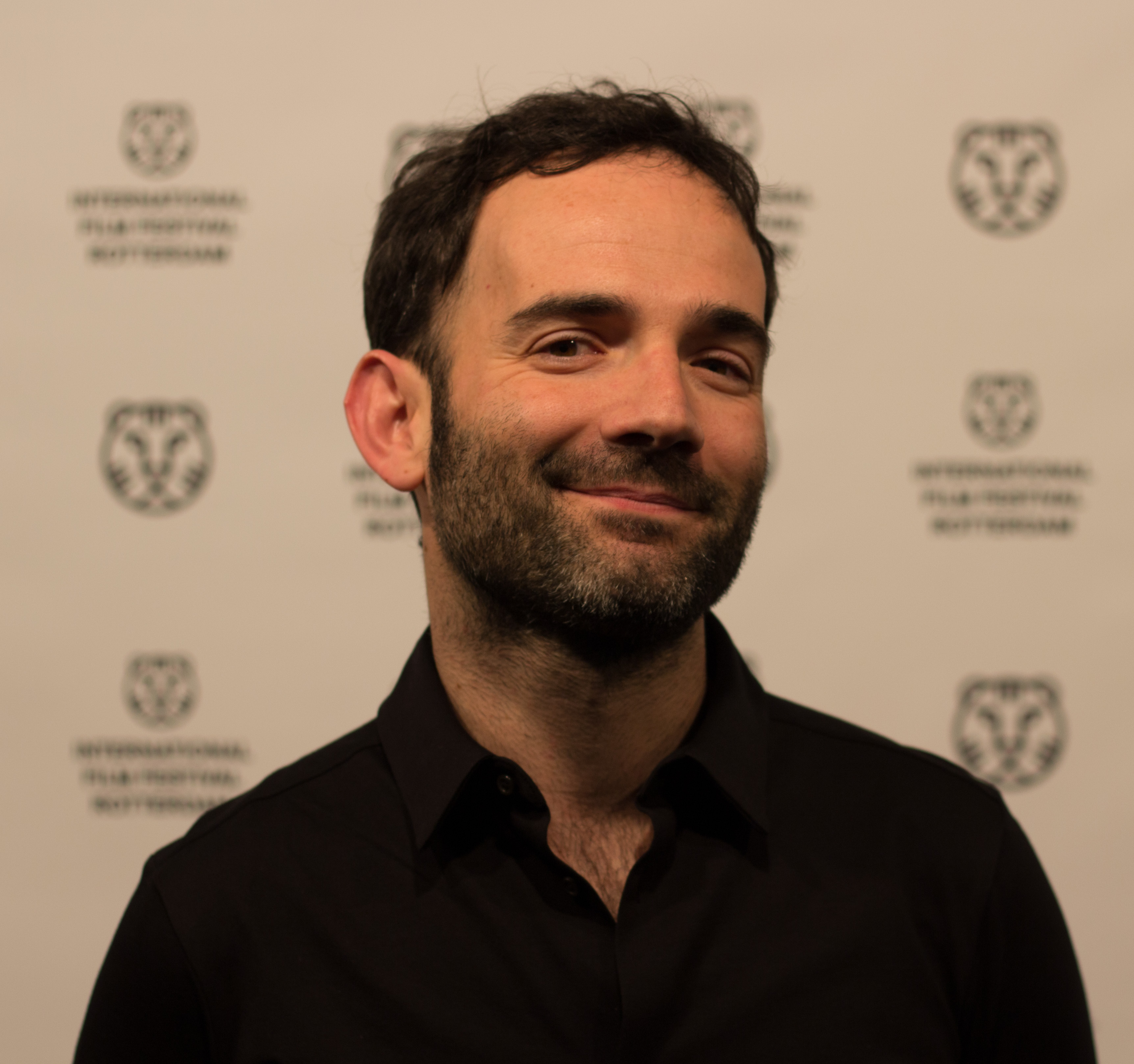
López Carrasco in 2020

Luis López Carrasco (born 1981) is a Spanish filmmaker, writer, and lecturer. He was born in Murcia. He earned a licentiate degree in audiovisual communication from the Complutense University of Madrid. He has been active in documentary and experimental filmmaking for years. He is best known for his documentary film The Year of the Discovery, which won the Goya Award for Best Documentary. He won the Premio Herralde literary prize for his novel El desierto blanco in 2023. He is a lecturer at the University of Castilla-La Mancha.
