= Adú =

2020 Spanish Film by Salvador Calvo

- Film poster
- Directed by: Salvador Calvo
- Written by: Alejandro Hernández
- Produced by: Ghislain Barrois; Álvaro Augustin; Javier Ugarte; Edmon Roch
- Starring: Luis Tosar; Álvaro Cervantes; Anna Castillo; Moustapha Oumarou; Miquel Fernández; Jesús Carroza; Adam Nourou; Zayidiyya Dissou; Nora Navas; Ana Wagener
- Cinematography: Sergi Vilanova
- Edited by: Jaime Colis
- Music by: Roque Baños
- Production companies: Telecinco Cinema; Ikiru Films; La Terraza Films; Un Mundo Prohibido AIE; Mogambo Productions
- Distributed by: Paramount Pictures
- Release date: 31 January 2020
- Running time: 119 minutes
- Country: Spain
- Languages: French; English; Spanish

Adú is a 2020 Spanish drama film directed by Salvador Calvo, written by Alejandro Hernández and starring Moustapha Oumarou, Luis Tosar and Álvaro Cervantes. The film premiered in Spain on 31 January 2020.

The film won four Goya Awards, including Best Director for Calvo and Best New Actor for Adam Nourou, from a total of thirteen nominations, at the 35th Goya Awards.

== Plot ==
The film intertwines three storylines related to the African immigration to Europe. A six-year-old boy and his older sister make a desperate attempt to flee Cameroon for Europe, waiting on a runway to smuggle themselves inside an airplane's cargo hold. Not far away, an activist against illegal hunting discovers the terrible scene of a dead elephant, its tusks removed. As well as fighting against illegal poaching, he has to face issues with his daughter, recently arrived in the country. Thousands of miles to the north, in Melilla, a Spanish city in North Africa, a group of civil guards face a mass assault on the Melilla border fence by Africans desperate to gain access to Spain.

== Cast ==
- Moustapha Oumarou as Adú
- Luis Tosar as Gonzalo
- Álvaro Cervantes as Mateo
- Anna Castillo as Sandra
- Miquel Fernández as Miguel
- Jesús Carroza as Javi
- Adam Nourou as Massar
- Zayiddiya Dissou as Alika
- Ana Wagener as Paloma
- Nora Navas as Carmen
- Issaka Sawadogo as Kebila
- Bella Agossou as Safí
- Josean Bengoetxea as Comandante Guardia Civil
- Eliane Chagas as Leke
- Koffi Gahou as Neko

== Production ==
The film is a Telecinco Cinema, Ikiru Films, La Terraza Films, Un Mundo Prohibido AIE and Mogambo production, it had the collaboration of Mediaset España and Mediterráneo Mediaset España Group and funding from ICAA.

== Reception ==
On review aggregator website Rotten Tomatoes, the film holds an approval rating of 83% based on 6 reviews, with an average rating of 7.3/10.

== Awards and nominations ==
Awards	Category	Nominated	Result
Goya Awards	Best Film		Nominated
Goya Awards	Best Director	Salvador Calvo	Won
Goya Awards	Best Original Screenplay	Alejandro Hernández	Nominated
Goya Awards	Best Supporting Actor	Álvaro Cervantes	Nominated
Goya Awards	Best New Actor	Adam Nourou	Won
Goya Awards	Best Cinematography	Sergi Vilanova	Nominated
Goya Awards	Best Editing	Jaime Colis	Nominated
Goya Awards	Best Art Direction	César Macarrón	Nominated
Goya Awards	Best Production Supervision	Ana Parra and Luis Fernández Lago	Won
Goya Awards	Best Sound	Eduardo Esquide, Jamaica Ruíz García, Juan Ferro and Nicolas de Poulpiquet	Won
Goya Awards	Best Makeup and Hairstyles	Elena Cuevas, Mara Collazo and Sergio López	Nominated
Goya Awards	Best Original Score	Roque Baños	Nominated
Goya Awards	Best Original Song	"Sababoo" by Cherif Badua and Roque Baños	Nominated
8th Feroz Awards	Best Original Soundtrack	Roque Baños	Nominated

== See also ==
- List of Spanish films of 2020
