= Cross the Line (film) =

2020 film by David Victori

- Film poster
- Spanish: No matarás
- Directed by: David Victori
- Written by: David Victori; Jordi Vallejo; Clara Viola
- Produced by: Laura Fernández Brites; Carlos Fernández
- Starring: Mario Casas; Milena Smit; Elisabeth Larena
- Cinematography: Elías M. Félix
- Edited by: Alberto Gutiérrez
- Music by: Adrian Foulkes; Federico Jusid
- Production company: Filmax
- Distributed by: Filmax
- Release dates: 10 October 2020 (Sitges); 16 October 2020 (Spain)
- Running time: 92 minutes
- Country: Spain
- Language: Spanish

Cross the Line (Spanish: No matarás) is a 2020 Spanish thriller film directed by David Victori. It stars Mario Casas alongside Milena Smit and Elisabeth Larena.

The film won the Goya Award for Best Actor (Casas) from a total of three nominations at the 35th Goya Awards. At the 8th Feroz Awards, the film also won Best Actor, from a total of four nominations.

== Plot ==
Dani is a man working in a travel agency. He experiences the death of his father, outwardly dealing with the situation in a quite unperturbed manner. Upon the unexpected and unwanted entry of his sister Laura in the company's office he works in asking for a tour package, he reluctantly begins to toy with the plan of reserving a package to travel around the world. One night, a stranger, a woman, asks Dani for money to pay for a burger in a bar, which he accepts. He leaves the place and the woman joins him afterward. Accompanied by Dani, the woman breaks into a tattoo store which the woman claims to be owned by some of her friends by getting the keys of the storefront's roller security shutter hidden in a drainage channel located nearby. Once inside, and following the woman's deactivation of the security alarm by entering the code, she tries to convince a begrudging Dani to get a tattoo. After drinking alcohol, the woman (Mila) tattoos the word 'vuela' (Note: Spanish: imperative form of volar ('to fly').) on Dani's right arm. Mila then takes a selfie together with Dani using a Polaroid, putting the snapshot on a panel with other photographs.

Dani and Mila leave the place and move to an apartment, where they start having sex. An angry and violent man (Ray, Mila's boyfriend) enters the apartment, threatening Dani and Mila. Ray attacks Dani, who then stabs Ray in self-defence, and so Ray bleeds to death. Mila, claiming that the police would be persuaded to believe Dani's good boy version instead of hers, attempts suicide by jumping out of the window. Also horrified and nervous, a hooded Dani flees from the scene. Dani asks his sister Laura (a well-connected lawyer) for help and information about what the police know about the events in the building. After finding out that the only physical evidence connecting him to the deaths is the Polaroid photograph featuring him and Mila, Dani decides to return to the tattoo store in order to remove the evidence. He activates the alarm and so the store's staff (who were just leaving the place) begin to chase him in the store, and then in the streets of Barcelona. Dani ends up prevailing. Also, having learned that Mila is actually alive and badly wounded, Dani visits her hospital room. The film ends with a deranged and blood-stained Dani being torn about what to do with Mila.

== Cast ==
- Mario Casas as Dani
- Milena Smit as Mila
- Elisabeth Larena as Laura
- Fernando Valdivielso as Ray
- Javier Mula as Berni

== Production ==
The film is a Filmax production, with the participation of TVE, TVC and Movistar+. It was shot in Barcelona.

== Release ==
The film had its world premiere at the 53rd Sitges Film Festival on 10 October 2020. Distributed by Filmax, it was theatrically released in Spain on 16 October 2020.

== Reception ==
According to the review aggregation website Rotten Tomatoes, Cross the Line has a 100% approval rating based on 5 reviews from critics, with an average rating of 7.7/10.

Ard Vijn of ScreenAnarchy was tempted to go as far as considering the film as "one of the best thrillers of recent times", praising how "refreshing" is it "to see something this well-made, straightforward rather than formulaic, seemingly flashy yet rooted in reality, and without any groan-inducing flaws or inconsistencies".

== Awards ==
Year	Award	Category	Nominee(s)	Result	Ref.
2021	8th Feroz Awards	Best Drama Film		Nominated	
2021	8th Feroz Awards	Best Director	David Victori	Nominated	
2021	8th Feroz Awards	Best Actor in a Film	Mario Casas	Won	
2021	8th Feroz Awards	Best Original Soundtrack	Adrian Foulkes and Federico Jusid	Nominated	
2021	35th Goya Awards	Best Actor	Mario Casas	Won	
2021	35th Goya Awards	Best New Actor	Fernando Valdivielso	Nominated	
2021	35th Goya Awards	Best New Actress	Milena Smit	Nominated	

== See also ==
- List of Spanish films of 2020
