= The Europeans (2020 film) =

2020 Spanish comedy film

- Film poster
- Spanish: Los Europeos
- Directed by: Víctor García León
- Written by: Marta L. Castillo; Bernardo Sánchez
- Based on: The Europeans (1960) by Rafael Azcona
- Produced by: Louise Bellicaud; Claire Charles-Gervais; Jaime Gona; Xavier Granada; Enrique López Lavigne
- Starring: Raúl Arévalo; Juan Diego Botto; Stéphane Caillard
- Cinematography: Eva Díaz
- Edited by: Buster Franco
- Music by: Selma Mutal
- Release dates: 28 August 2020 (Málaga); 20 November 2020 (Spain)
- Running time: 89 minutes
- Country: Spain
- Language: Spanish

The Europeans (Spanish: Los Europeos) is a 2020 Spanish romantic comedy film directed by Víctor García León, starring Raúl Arévalo and Juan Diego Botto.

The film was nominated for three Goya Awards and four Feroz Awards.

== Cast ==
- Raúl Arévalo as Miguel Alonso
- Juan Diego Botto as Antonio
- Stéphane Caillard as Odette
- Carolina Lapausa as Vicen
- Dritan Biba as Dimitri
- Boris Ruiz as Matín Ojeda
- Aida Ballmann as Erika

== Plot ==
In the late 1950s, in Spain, Miguel and Antonio, two unmarried men in their early thirties, embark on a journey to Ibiza, enticed by the allure of the European sexual myth and the promise of liberation. However, their experiences on the island turn out to be far from what they had anticipated.

== Awards ==
Awards	Category	Nominated	Result
Goya Awards	Best Adapted Screenplay	Bernardo Sánchez and Marta Libertad Castillo	Nominated
Goya Awards	Best Supporting Actor	Juan Diego Botto	Nominated
Goya Awards	Best Costume Design	Lena Mossum	Nominated
Feroz Awards	Best Comedy Film		Nominated
Feroz Awards	Best Film Poster		Nominated
Feroz Awards	Best Main Actor in a Film	Raúl Arévalo	Nominated
Feroz Awards	Best Supporting Actor in a Film	Juan Diego Botto	Won
