= Coven (2020 film) =

2020 film directed by Pablo Agüero

- Film poster
- Basque: Akelarre
- Directed by: Pablo Agüero
- Written by: Pablo Agüero; Katell Guillou
- Produced by: Fred Prémel; Iker Ganuza; Koldo Zuazua
- Starring: Amaia Aberasturi; Alex Brendemühl
- Cinematography: Javier Agirre
- Edited by: Teresa Font
- Music by: Maite Arrotajauregi; Aránzazu Calleja
- Production companies: Sorgin Films; Lamia Producciones Audiovisuales; Kowalski Films; Gariza Produkzioak, Tita Productions; La Fidèle Productions; Tita B. Productions; Campocine
- Release dates: 19 September 2020 (Zinemaldia); 2 October 2020 (Spain)
- Running time: 90 minutes
- Countries: Spain; Argentina; France
- Languages: Spanish; Basque

Coven (Basque: Akelarre) is a 2020 historical drama film directed by Pablo Agüero, starring Amaia Aberasturi and Alex Brendemühl.

It won five Goya Awards from a total of nine nominations at the 35th Goya Awards. At the 8th Feroz Awards, the film was nominated in six categories.

The film was produced by Sorgin Films, Lamia Producciones Audiovisuales, Kowalski Films, Gariza Produkzioak, Tita Productions, La Fidèle Productions, Tita B. Productions and Campocine.

== Plot ==
In 1609 in the Basque Country a group of five teenagers are captured and arrested as main suspects of witchcraft, as they celebrated a party in the woods. Judge Rostegui, given the task of purifying the region by the King, arrests the girls and accuses them of witchcraft. He decides to do whatever it takes to make them confess, and tell him what they know about the akelarre, a ceremony with magical connotations, during which the Devil is said to initiate his servants and mate with them.

Even though they deny it, and there is no evidence against them, they are arrested and tortured in order to force them to sign a written confession. After another of their friends is arrested, one of the girls, Ana, confesses to be a witch, claiming she cast a spell on the rest of her sisters and friends. Ana's plan is to gain enough time for the girls to organise an escape when the men of the village return from their fishing. As a result she spends a whole day confessing a detailed sabbath festivity - in reality a twisted version of the party she and the girls held before their arrest.

Judge Rostegui postpones the girls' execution when Ana says she can only use her magic in every full moon night as she feels Lucifer's calling. Her portrayal convinces Rostegui who offers to deliver every item for the sabbath which causes some of his men to distrust him. One of his allies warns him that after the full moon, the village men will return and the girls will be set free. Rostegui rushes the girls' execution and takes them to the woods for the ceremony with all of Ana's specifications. Understanding their situation, Ana leads her friends in a dance demonstration as they play along as witches and sing in the Basque language. Rostegui is entranced, but all of his men, along with village's priest are frightened of the "sabbath".

Ana and the rest of the girls flee as Rostegui and his men have an argument; a chase through the woods ensues until the girls are cornered at a cliff. As they join hands, one of the village women elders sings in Basque about the tide brought by the full moon which motivates the girls to jump off from the cliff to Rostegui and his men's surprise.

== Cast ==
- Amaia Aberasturi as Ana
- Alex Brendemühl as Rostegui
- Daniel Fanego as Consejero
- Garazi Urkola as Katalin
- Yune Nogueiras as María

== Reception ==
Coven received generally positive reviews from film critics. It holds an 86% approval rating on review aggregator website Rotten Tomatoes based on fourteen reviews, with an average rating of 6.8/10.

== Awards ==
Awards	Category	Nominated	Result
Goya Awards	Best Actress	Amaia Aberasturi	Nominated
Goya Awards	Best Cinematography	Javier Agirre	Nominated
Goya Awards	Best Art Direction	Mikel Serrano	Won
Goya Awards	Best Production Supervision	Guadalupe Balaguer Trelles	Nominated
Goya Awards	Best Sound	Urko Garai, Josefina Rodriguez, Frédéric Hamelin and Leandro de Loredo	Nominated
Goya Awards	Best Special Effects	Mariano García Marty and Ana Rubio	Won
Goya Awards	Best Costume Design	Nerea Torrijos	Won
Goya Awards	Best Makeup and Hairstyles	Beata Wotjowicz and Ricardo Molina	Won
Goya Awards	Best Original Score	Maite Arrotajauregi and Aránzazu Calleja	Won
Feroz Awards	Best Drama Film		Nominated
Feroz Awards	Best Trailer		Nominated
Feroz Awards	Best Film Poster		Nominated
Feroz Awards	Best Actress	Amaia Aberasturi	Nominated
Feroz Awards	Best Supporting Actor	Alex Brendemühl	Nominated
Feroz Awards	Best Original Soundtrack	Maite Arrotajauregi and Aránzazu Calleja	Nominated
