= Fernando Aramburu =

Spanish writer

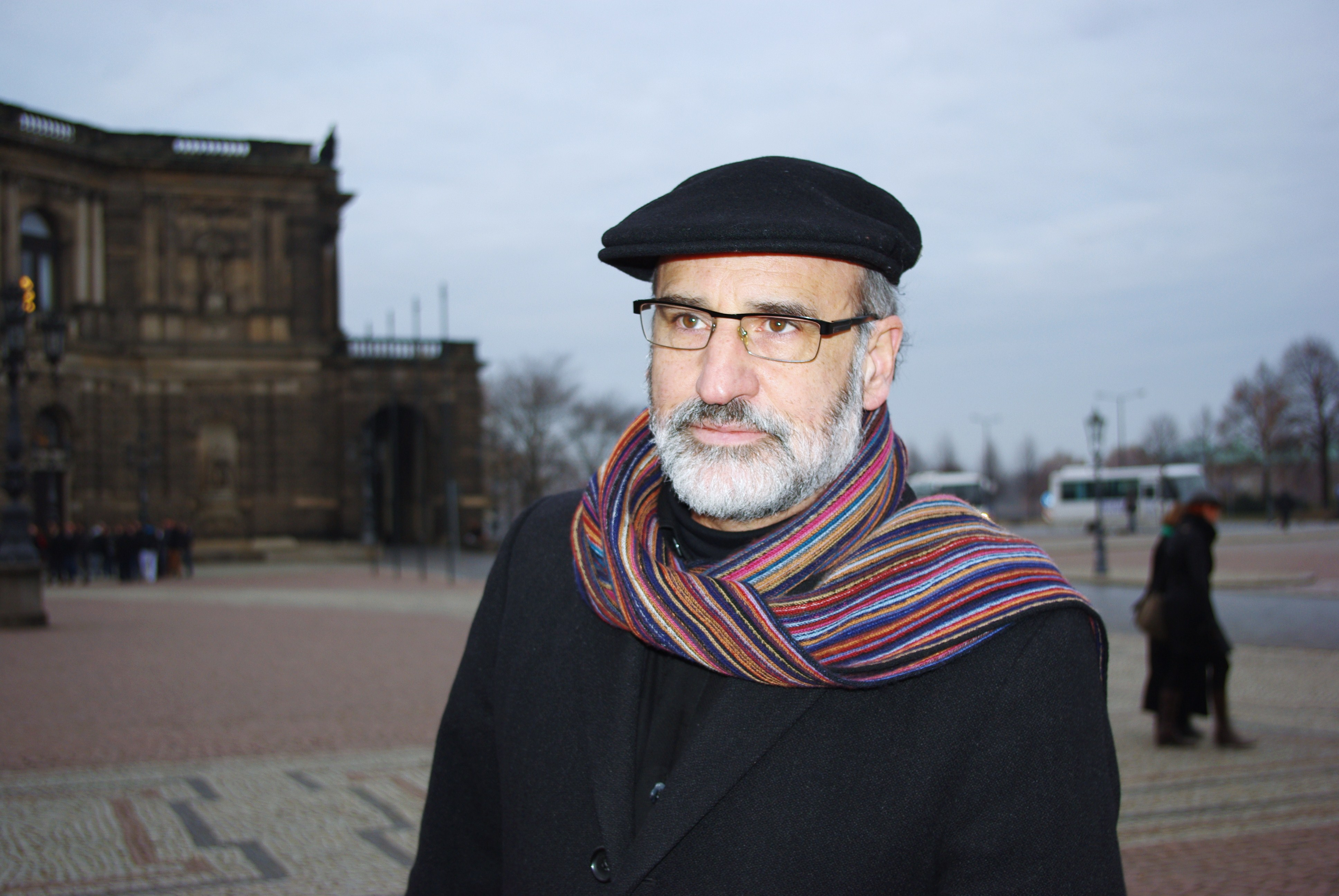
Fernando Aramburu in 2011

Fernando Aramburu (San Sebastián, 1959) is a Spanish writer. He is the author of the novel Patria (English title: "Homeland"), which deals with terrorism in the Basque Country. His novels and poems have received important prizes: Tusquets, Vargas Llosa NH Prize, National Critics' Prize and National Prize for Narrative Writing.

== Career ==
He graduated in Spanish Philology from University of Zaragoza and has been living and working as a lecturer in Spanish language in Germany since 1985. His 2006 novel Fuegos con limón described his youthful experiences in Grupo CLOC de Arte y Desarte, a surrealist group which published a magazine between 1978 and 1981. He won the Premio Tusquets de Novela in 2011 for his novel Años lentos, and the Premio Biblioteca Breve in 2015 for Ávidas pretensiones.

== Works ==
- Fuegos con limón (Fires with Lemon) (won the Ramón Gómez de le Serna prize in 1997).
- Los ojos vacíos (Empty Eyes) (Euskadi Prize in 2001)
- El Trompetista del Utopia (The Trompetist of Utopia) (made into a film called Under the Stars)
- Bambi sin sombra (Shadowless Bambi)
- El artista y su cadaver (The Artist and his Corpse) (short prose writings)
- Vida de un piojo llamado Matías (Life of a louse called Matias) (children's book)
- No ser no duele (Not being does not hurt) (short stories)
- Los peces de la amargura (The Fish of Bitterness) (short stories; won the Mario Varga Llosa NH prize in 2006). Real Academia Prize, and Dulce Chacón Prize.
- El vigilante del fiordo (The Fjord Watchman) (short stories) (2011)
- Ávidas pretensiones (Avid Pretensions) (2014)
- Patria (Homeland) (2016). National Critics' Prize and National Prize for Narrative Writing.
- Autorretrato sin mí (Self-portrait without me) (2018)
- Los vencejos (The swifts) (2021)
- El niño (The child) (2024)

== Sources ==
- (eus) Arinas, Txema (Berria 10/11/2016), 'Eppur si muove' Retrieved 25/08/2018.
- (es) Zaldua, Iban (https://vientosur.info/ 22 March 2017), «La literatura, ¿sirve para algo? Una crítica de Patria, de Fernando Aramburu». Retrieved 25/08/2018.
- Bedside stories No. 8. - NH Hoteles
