= Patria (novel) =

2016 novel by Fernando Aramburu

Patria ("Homeland") is a 2016 novel by the Spanish writer Fernando Aramburu, published by Tusquets Eds. The story takes place in the Basque Country, at the time when ETA declared disbandment.

== Plot ==
The novel delves into the world of murderers, their victims and the family context of both. The story begins when ETA definitively abandons its armed struggle. A widow, Bittori, goes to the cemetery to visit the grave of her husband, Txato, who had been killed by ETA. Given the new situation, she decides to return to the house and the town where they had lived before the attack.

== Reception ==
The book was very popular and was widely discussed in the Basque Country.

In Spanish it has been read by more than one million readers, and has been translated into English (as Homeland, Pantheon Publishers 2019), German (with 80,000 books sold), Italian (60,000 books), Greek, and Catalan. More than 12 editions have been published in Spanish. It was awarded the 2016 Premio de la Crítica Award, and the 2017 National Narrative Award.

== Adaptation ==
Towards the end of 2017, HBO Europe announced the production of a series based on the novel. Filming began in the Basque Country in 2018, and the series premiered in September 2020.

The series was produced by HBO Europe along with Alea Media, a production company created by Mediaset España Comunicación and Aitor Gabilondo.
