= Muriel Robin =

French actress (born 1955)

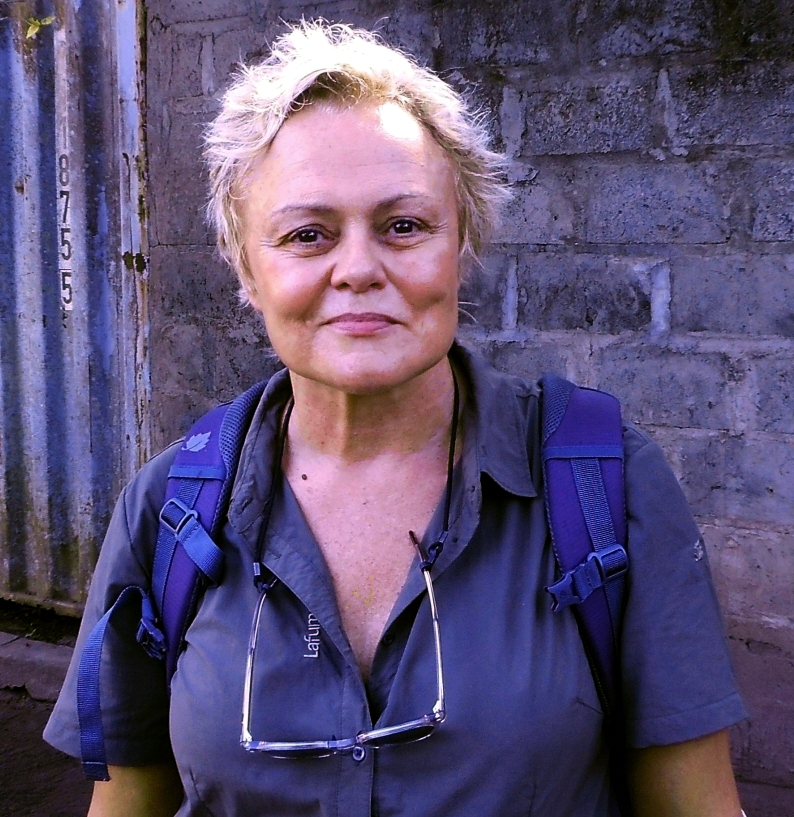
- Robin in Basankusu in 2016
- Born: 2 August 1955 (age 70); Montbrison, Loire, France
- Occupations: Actress, comedian
- Years active: 1981–present
- Spouse: Anne Le Nen (m. 2021)

Muriel Robin (French pronunciation: [myʁjɛl ʁɔbɛ̃]; born 2 August 1955) is a French actress and comedian. She won an International Emmy Award for Best Actress in 2007 and received a nomination for a César Award in 2001 and six nominations for a Molière Award.

== Early years ==
Muriel Robin is the youngest of three children of Antoine Robin and Aimée Rimbaud, who owned shoe-shops in Montbrison. She had two sisters, Nydia and Martine. In 1960, the family moved to Saint-Étienne. When she was very young, she liked to make people laugh and dreamed of becoming a singer. After a lacklustre school career and a love of parties, she ended up failing her Baccalauréat twice in a row. Unsure of which career to follow, she started to sell shoes in one of the family's three shops, without being really motivated.

In 1977, aged 22, she left Saint-Étienne for Paris, taking a course in dramatic arts at Cours Florent, the entry college for the National Superior Conservatory for Dramatic Arts, in Paris. She graduated and returned to sell shoes in Saint-Étienne

== Career ==
=== 1980s ===
In 1981, she joined Roger Louret, whom she had met in Paris, in Monclar, with his theatre company, Les Baladins en Agenais. Notable people that she met there include Elie Semoun and Annie Grégorio. In 1983, she returned to Paris with Annie Grégorio to work at the Petit Théâtre de Bouvard., where she also met Didier Bénureau. She came up against the authoritarian methods of Philippe Bouvard, but, even so, he gave her a part in a play he had written, Double Foyer. Following that, she played in a role co-written with Didier Bénureau, Maman ou Donne-moi ton linge, je fais une machine, (Mother, or, Give me your laundry, I am washing a load), in 1986, in Avignon, and in 1987 in Paris, at the Théâtre de Dix heures. The play was later shown in Monclar at the Théâtre de Poche. She became known to the wider public, towards the end of the 1980s through a television programme called La Classe, broadcast by FR3 (which became France 3). Muriel Robin met and became good friends with Pierre Palmade. They created her first one-woman-show together, Les majorettes se cachent pour mourir, in 1988, directed by Roger Louret. This programme was a success and pushed Robin into the limelight.

=== 1990s ===
During the 1990s, Robin appeared in plays including Tout m’Enerve, Bedos-Robin a collaboration with Roger Louret, Feu la Ma La Mère, and On Purge Bébé. She also presented on radio, on Europe 1, with her programme, Tout Robin. In 1997, she obtained her first role in cinema, replacing Valérie Lemercier in Les Couloirs du temps : Les Visiteurs 2 by Jean-Marie Poiré. The same year she wrote and directed with Pierre Palmade in the play, Ils s'aiment,(They Love Each Other) played by Pierre Palmade and Michèle Laroque, which was a success and received a nomination for the Molière for the Best One-Man-Show or Sketch Show.

=== 2000s ===
In May, 2000, she announced that she would finish with the genre of the one-woman-show and concentrate on her profession as a comedian, but also that year, took her first big role in cinema in the eponymous role of Marie-Line, by Medhi Charef. Other roles on stage and screen followed, in the following years.

== Personal life ==
Robin is a lesbian, and has been out since she was young. Her partner is actress and producer Anne Le Nen.

She has strongly criticized the French film industry for blacklisting and refusing to cast LGBTQ actors, describing this behavior as "if you are gay, you are not desirable". While straight actors are seen as extending their acting range by taking LGBTQ roles, LGBTQ actors are, she says, routinely denied the opportunity to take straight roles. Robin says studios refused to cast her in serious roles due to her sexuality. Actor Éric Bernard, who is gay, supported Robin's comments citing the decline in his career following his main role in the LGBTQ+ film Sauvage.

=== Charity work ===
Between 1992 and 2007, Muriel Robin was active in supporting concerts by the Enfoirés given for "the Restos du Cœur" created by Coluche and of which she became a sponsor until 2007. In 2001 she became equally involved with the journalist Marine Jacquemin in "La Chaine de l’Espoir" (The Chain of Hope) organised by the French Medical Institute for "L'Enfant de Kaboul" (The child of Kabul), in Afghanistan. This hospital opened in 2005.

In 2022 French actors cut their hair in support of women in Iran. The protesters included Marion Cotillard and Juliette Binoche, as well as Isabelle Adjani, Charlotte Gainsbourg, Jane Birkin and Muriel Robin.

== Theatre ==
Year	Title	Author	Director	Notes
1986	Maman ou donne-moi ton linge, je fais une machine	Muriel Robin & Didier Bénureau	Roger Louret	
1988	Les majorettes se cachent pour mourir	Muriel Robin & Pierre Palmade	Roger Louret	Nominated - Molière Award for Best Newcomer Comedian
1989	Un point c'est tout	Muriel Robin	Roger Louret	Nominated - Molière Award for Best One Man Show
1990	Tout m'énerve	Muriel Robin & Pierre Palmade	Roger Louret	Nominated - Molière Award for Best One Man Show
1992	Bedos/Robin	Muriel Robin & Guy Bedos	Roger Louret	
1994	On purge bébé & Feu la mère de Madame	Georges Feydeau	Bernard Murat	
1996	Tout Robin	Muriel Robin	Roger Louret	Nominated - Molière Award for Best One Man Show
1996	Ils s'aiment	Muriel Robin & Pierre Palmade	Muriel Robin	
1998	Toute Seule comme une grande	Muriel Robin	Roger Louret	Nominated - Molière Award for Best One Man Show
2001	Ils se sont aimés	Muriel Robin & Pierre Palmade	Muriel Robin	
2002	La Griffe	Claude d'Anna & Laure Bonin	Annick Blancheteau	Nominated - Molière Award for Best Actress
2005	Au secours !	Muriel Robin	Roger Louret	
2007-08	Fugueuses	Christophe Duthuron & Pierre Palmade	Christophe Duthuron	
2009	Les Diablogues	Roland Dubillard	Jean-Michel Ribes	
2012	Tranches de Vies	Élie Semoun	Muriel Robin	
2013	Robin revient, tsoin, tsoin	Muriel Robin	Muriel Robin	Nominated - Globes de Cristal Award for Best One Man Show
2015	Momo	Sébastien Thiéry	Ladislas Chollat	Nominated - Molière Award for Best Actress

== Filmography ==
Year	Title	Role	Director	Notes
1985	Urgence		Gilles Béhat	
1985	Vive la mariée	The innkeeper	Jean Valère	TV movie
1986	Le bonheur a encore frappé	TV presenter	Jean-Luc Trotignon	
1988	La passerelle	The Guardian	Jean-Claude Sussfeld	
1988	Bonjour l'angoisse	Mademoiselle Champion	Pierre Tchernia	
1990	Après après-demain	The supervisor of the supermarket	Gérard Frot-Coutaz	
1998	The Visitors II: The Corridors of Time	Frénégonde de Pouille / Béatrice de Montmirail	Jean-Marie Poiré	
1999	Doggy Bag	Mama San	Frédéric Comtet	
2000	Marie-Line	Marie-Line	Mehdi Charef	Nominated - César Award for Best Actress
2001	Bécassine - Le trésor viking	Bécassine's voice	Philippe Vidal	
2005	Saint-Jacques... La Mecque	Clara	Coline Serreau	
2006	The Poisoner	Marie Besnard	Christian Faure	International Emmy Award for Best Actress
2008	Fugueuses	Margot	Christophe Duthuron	TV movie
2008	Musée haut, musée bas	Dame Kandinsky	Jean-Michel Ribes	
2009	The Ball of the Actresses	Herself	Maïwenn	
2009	Mourir d'aimer	Gabrielle Delorme	Josée Dayan	TV movie
2009	Folie douce	Juliette Monceau	Josée Dayan (2)	TV movie
2010	Ni reprise, ni échangée	Juliette	Josée Dayan (3)	TV movie
2011	Hollywoo	Michèle	Frédéric Berthe & Pascal Serieis	
2011	On ne choisit pas sa famille	Kim	Christian Clavier	
2012	Le paradis des bêtes	Stéphane Durand	Estelle Larrivaz	
2012	Passage du Désir	Lola Jost	Jérôme Foulon	TV movie
2013	Le clan des Lanzac	Anne Lanzac	Josée Dayan (4)	TV movie
2013	Y'a pas d'âge	Brigitte Gompard	Stéphane Marelli	TV series (1 episode)
2013	Indiscrétions	Clémence Lacombe	Josée Dayan (5)	TV movie
2014	Entre vents et marées	Cécile	Josée Dayan (6)	TV movie
2016	Sophie's Misfortunes	Madame Fichini	Christophe Honoré	
2016	Capitaine Marleau	Garance Thibaut	Josée Dayan (7)	TV series (1 episode)
2020	Call My Agent!	herself	Marc Fitoussi	TV series (1 episode)
2021	Doutes	Agnès	François Hanss	TV movie
2023 to date	Master Crimes	Louise Arbus	Marwen Abdallah	TV series (2 seasons)
