= Kamikaze (2014 film) =

- Theatrical release poster
- Directed by: Álex Pina
- Screenplay by: Álex Pina; Iván Escobar
- Produced by: Mikel Lejarza; Mercedes Gamero; Álex Pina; Ignacio Fernández-Vega; Daniel Écija
- Starring: Álex García; Eduardo Blanco; Verónica Echegui; Carmen Machi; Leticia Dolera; Iván Massagué; Héctor Alterio
- Cinematography: Migue Amoedo
- Edited by: Antonio de Frutos
- Music by: Manel Santisteban
- Production companies: Atresmedia Cine; Cangrejo Films; Globomedia
- Distributed by: Warner Bros. Pictures
- Release dates: 24 March 2014 (Málaga); 28 March 2014 (Spain)
- Country: Spain
- Language: Spanish

Kamikaze is a 2014 Spanish comedy-drama film directed by Álex Pina from a screenplay by Pina and Iván Escobar which stars Álex García, Eduardo Blanco, Verónica Echegui, Carmen Machi, Leticia Dolera, Iván Massagué and Héctor Alterio.

== Plot ==
The plot follows a suicidal bomber from a fictional country from the Caucasus who sees his plans thwarted by chance and is forced to stay in a winter resort with a group of Spaniards.

== Cast ==
- Álex García as Slatan
- Eduardo Blanco as Eugene
- Verónica Echegui as Nancy
- Carmen Machi as Lola
- Leticia Dolera as Natalia
- Iván Massagué as Camilo
- Héctor Alterio as anciano ('old man')

== Production ==
The film is an Atresmedia Cine, Cangrejo Films, and Globomedia production. Shooting locations included the Aragonese Pyrenees, Madrid, and Toledo.

== Release ==
The film screened on 24 March 2014 at the 17th Málaga Film Festival. Distributed by Warner Bros. Pictures España, the film was released theatrically in Spain on 28 March 2014.

== Reception ==
Jonathan Holland of The Hollywood Reporter deemed the feel-good movie about a suicide bomber to be a "a bizarre hybrid of genres that wants to do many things but doesn't do any of them very well".

Andrea G. Bermejo of Cinemanía rated the film 2 out of 5 stars, writing that the film avoids thriller and drama, genres both "suitable" for the story the film wants to tell, opting "for an improbable tone of costumbrista comedy" instead.

== See also ==
- List of Spanish films of 2014
