= Don't Blame the Karma for Being an Idiot =

Don't Blame the Karma
- Film poster
- Directed by: María Ripoll
- Written by: Carlos Montero Castiñeira; Breixo Corral; Sacha Perales
- Produced by: Francisco Ramos
- Starring: Verónica Echegui; Álex Garcia; Jordi Sánchez; Elvira Mínguez
- Music by: Simon Smith
- Production companies: Sony Pictures Televisión Española, Movistar+, Televisió de Catalunya, AXN, Vodafone
- Distributed by: Sony Pictures
- Release date: 26 November 2016 (Spain)
- Country: Spain
- Language: Spanish

Don't Blame it on your Karma (Spanish: No culpes al karma de lo que te pasa por gilipollas) is a 2016 Spanish romantic comedy film based on a novel by Laura Norton.

== Plot ==
In 1990's Sara is a high school unpopular girl. She has a crush on the popular Aarón Humilde, a senior high school who has a band. After Aarón leaves town unannounced they lose contact.

Now, 13 years later, she works with feathers, making hats, bow ties, dresses, and anything else that might require plumage. She is considered an artist and has a small workshop in a Madrid neighborhood. Unbeknownst to her, her quiet, ordered world is about to collapse. Sara will have to put up with a fleeing mother, a depressed father, a rebellious sister, and her eccentric fiancé. She'll also reunite with a boyfriend she hasn't seen in ages who's about to make her an absurd proposal.

== Cast ==
- Verónica Echegui as Sara Escribano.
- Álex Garcia as Aarón Humilde, Sara's past dream boy who is engaged to Lucía.
- Elvira Mínguez as Berta Milagros Rodríguez, Sara and Lucia's mother.
- Alba Galocha as Lucía Escribano, Aarón' s fiancé and Sara's sister.
- Jordi Sánchez as Arturo Escribano, an architect.

== Production ==
The film is associate produced by Spanish pubcaster Televisión Española (TVE), its biggest pay TV operator, Movistar Plus, regional state TV Televisió de Catalunya and Sony channel AXN España, a full flush of TV players which underscores the title's attractiveness. Spain's ICAA Film and Audiovisual Arts Institute and the Catalan Institute of Cultural Enterprises (ICEC) put up co-funding.

Verónica Echegui was not the first choice for the role of Sara. The role of Sara was originally played by Clara Lago but then she declined in favor to starring in the film Orbiter 9.

The film was shot during seven weekends in Guadalajara, Madrid, and Hong Kong.

== Soundtrack ==
The music created for the film is divided into two parts – Aaron's songs and the film score itself. The score itself is a mixture of kooky vintage, indie pop and funky nonsense that complements the very strong visual style of the film.

The soundtrack and original songs were composed by Simon Smith. The lead male character, Aaron, is a pop star and there are many musical scenes that needed original songs to establish the character's career and reveal his feelings. Victor Hernandez also provided help with lyrics and song development before shooting. Alex Garcia, who plays Aaron, had never sung before and took intensive voice and guitar lessons and worked closely with Simon and Maria to develop the character.

The soundtrack has a fresh pop style, drawing on funk, jazz, pop, dub, dance music and electronic music. Simon also wrote several other songs for the score in English that reappear throughout the film, sung by Catalan singer Maria Rodés, to represent the inner mind of the female lead character, Sara.

== Release ==
The film was its world premiere was held at Cine Capitol on 8 November 2016 in Madrid, Spain Sony Pictures has also acquired worldwide distribution rights.

This film is also featured in the 2017 Miami International Film Festival’s HBO Ibero American Competition Film Category and Málaga Film Festival The film was nominated for Best Costume Design at Goya Award.

=== Box office ===
The film grossed $2,236,857 in Spain.

=== Home media ===
The DVD of Don't Blame the Karma was released on 15 March 2017, in both single-disc and two-disc deluxe editions and also released on VHS and UMD Video formats. In addition to the film, the deluxe edition contained featurettes and other bonus materials.
