= Fernando Guallar =

Spanish actor (born 1989)

Fernando Guallar (Córdoba, March 7, 1989) is a Spanish actor known for acting in the series Velvet Colección (2017–2019) and Luis Miguel: The Series (2021).

== Biography ==
Fernando was born in Córdoba in 1989. He studied Architecture at the Higher Technical School of Architecture of the Polytechnic University of Valencia completing his education and obtaining the degree, despite he has never practiced professionally. He trained in acting, singing and voice between Madrid and New York in different schools and courses. He has worked episodically on numerous Spanish fictions, such as Aída, Sin identidad and La que se avecina. In 2017, he had a more prominent role in the series Perdóname, Señor. He also had a recurring role in the daily series Amar es para siempre.

In 2016, he joined the main cast of the series Movistar+ Velvet Colección, where he played Sergio Godó. In 2019 he participated in his first feature film with Patricia Font in the film In Family I Trust, next to Clara Lago o Álex García. In 2020 he starred in the film My Heart Goes Boom!, with Ingrid García Jonsson, for which he is nominated for Best Male Performance at the ASECAN Andalusian Film Awards. That same year he participated in the series Patria, on HBO Español.

He has also worked in short films such as MINECRAFT – which earned him the award for best international actor at the Flagler Film Festival in Florida and the nomination for best actor at the Piélagos Festival – by Inés Pintor and Pablo Santidrián.

In 2021, he joined in the second season of the Netflix series Luis Miguel: The Series, where he plays Mauricio Ambrosi, which was renewed for a third and final season. In addition, he began filming the romantic comedy El juego de las llaves (tr. "The game of keys"), directed by Vicente Villanueva, which is based on the Prime Video series of the same name.

== Filmography ==
=== Movies ===
Year	Title	Character	Director
2019	In Family I Trust	Víctor	Patricia Font
2020	My Heart Goes Boom!	Pablo Cuesta	Nacho Álvarez
2022	El juego de las llaves	Sergio Morales Paniza	Vicente Villanueva
2023	The Tenderness	Verdemar	Vicente Villanueva
2024	Love, Divided	David	Patricia Font
2024	Valenciana	Ricardo Zamora	

=== Television ===
Year	Title	Character	Channel	Notes
2012	Aída	Extra	Telecinco	1 episode
2015	Sin identidad	Oficial de Policía	Antena 3	1 episode
2015	La que se avecina	Chico baño	Telecinco	1 episode
2015	Carlos, rey emperador	Guarda Real	TVE	1 episode
2016–2018	Amar es para siempre	Gonzalo Inchausti Saiz	Antena 3	Recurring character; 228 episodes
2017	Perdóname, Señor	Sam	Telecinco	Recurring character; 4 episodes
2017–2019	Velvet Colección	Sergio Godó Rey	Movistar+	Main cast; 21 episodes
2020	Patria	Quique	HBO España	1 episode
2021	Luis Miguel: la serie	Mauricio Ambrosi	Netflix	Main cast; 14 episodes
2024	Reina Roja	Tomás	Prime Video	Recurring character; 8 episodes

== Awards ==
- 2016: Award for best international actor at the Flagler Film Festival in Florida
- 2016: Nominated for best actor at the Piélagos en Corto Festival, Cantabria.
- 2020: Nominated for best male performance at the Andalusian Film Awards (ASECAN).
