= El Inmortal. Gangs of Madrid =

Spanish crime drama television series

- Spanish: El inmortal
- Genre: Crime drama
- Created by: José Manuel Lorenzo
- Screenplay by: Diego Sotelo; David Moreno
- Directed by: David Ulloa; Rafa Montesinos
- Starring: Álex García; Emilio Palacios; Marcel Borràs; Jason Day; María Hervás; Claudia Pineda; Teresa Riott; Jon Kortajarena; Francis Lorenzo; Irene Esser; Richard Holmes; Jaeme Velez; Moussa Echarif; Iria del Río; Manuel Manquiña
- Country of origin: Spain
- Original language: Spanish
- No. of seasons: 2
- No. of episodes: 14

Production
- Production locations: Community of Madrid; Province of Alicante
- Production companies: Movistar+; Telemundo International Studios; DLO Producciones

Original release
- Network: Movistar+
- Release: 27 October 2022

El Inmortal. Gangs of Madrid (Spanish: El inmortal) is a Spanish crime drama television series produced by Movistar+, Telemundo International Studios and DLO Producciones. It stars Álex García in the leading role.

== Premise ==
The plot consists of the fictionalization of the story of 'Los Miamis', a criminal organization led by "El inmortal" that controlled cocaine trafficking in Madrid in the 1990s.

== Cast ==
- Álex García as José Antonio, "El inmortal"
- Emilio Palacios as Sebas.
- Marcel Borràs as Rober
- Jason Day as Fausti
- María Hervás as Isabel
- Claudia Pineda as Maui
- Teresa Riott as La Rubia
- Jon Kortajarena
- Francis Lorenzo as comisario Corvarán
- Chanel Terrero
- Irene Esser
- Richard Holmes
- Jaeme Vélez
- Moussa Echarif
- Iria del Río
- Manuel Manquiña

== Production ==
El inmortal was created by José Manuel Lorenzo. Produced by Movistar+ and Telemundo International Studios in collaboration with DLO Producciones, the series was written by Diego Sotelo and David Moreno and directed by David Ulloa and Rafa Montesinos. Consisting of eight 50-minute-long episodes, the series began shooting in Madrid (Aluche) on 4 May 2021. Shooting took place in locations of the Madrid region and the province of Alicante and wrapped by August 2021.

== Release ==
The series had its world premiere at the 2022 Canneseries competing for the Long Form competition. The series was presented at the Vitoria-based FesTVal. It premiered on Movistar+ on 27 October 2022.

== Reception ==
Raquel Hernandez Luján of HobbyConsolas rated the series 70 points ("good") citing the good performances and setting, as well as the soundtrack featuring 90s hits as the best things about the series, while also highlighting two important question marks such as the anticlimactic (open) ending and the poor sound production, with dialogues requiring to be guessed on the fly as inaudible as they are.

== Accolades ==
Year	Award	Category	Nominee(s)	Result	Ref.
2023	10th Feroz Awards	Best Actor in a TV Series	Álex García	Nominated	
2023	31st Actors and Actresses Union Awards	Best Television Actor in a Leading Role	Álex García	Nominated	
