= In Family I Trust =

2019 Spanish comedy film

- Spanish: Gente que viene y bah
- Directed by: Patricia Font
- Screenplay by: Darío Madrona; Carlos Montero
- Based on: Gente que viene y bah by Laura Norton
- Produced by: Iñaki Juaristi; Rafael López Manzanara; Francisco Ramos
- Starring: Clara Lago; Alex García; Alexandra Jiménez; Paula Malia; Fernando Guallar; Carlos Cuevas; Carmen Maura
- Cinematography: David Valldepérez
- Edited by: Liana Artigal
- Music by: Arnau Bataller
- Production companies: Zeta Cinema; Atresmedia Cine
- Distributed by: DeAPlaneta
- Release date: 18 January 2019
- Country: Spain
- Language: Spanish

In Family I Trust (Spanish: Gente que viene y bah, lit. 'People who come and go') is a 2019 Spanish romantic comedy film directed by Patricia Font which stars Clara Lago alongside Álex García, Alexandra Jiménez, Paula Malia, Fernando Guallar, Carlos Cuevas, and Carmen Maura. It is based on the novel by Laura Norton.

== Plot ==
After losing her job and her fiancee, Bea (an architect) faces the prospect of returning to her hometown.

== Cast ==
- Clara Lago as Bea
- Alexandra Jiménez as Irene
- Carmen Maura as Ángela
- Álex García as Diego
- Fernando Guallar as Víctor
- Carlos Cuevas as León
- Paula Malia as Débora
- Jorge León Martínez
- Eduardo Ferrés
- Marta Belmonte as Rebeca Ramos

== Production ==
A Zeta Cinema and Atresmedia Cine production, the film also had the participation of TV3 and Netflix.

== Release ==
Distributed by DeAPlaneta, it was theatrically released in Spain on 18 January 2019.

== See also ==
- List of Spanish films of 2019
