= Blind Date (2015 film) =

- Theatrical release poster
- Directed by: Clovis Cornillac
- Written by: Clovis Cornillac; Tristan Schulmann; Mathieu Oullion (collaborating writer); Lilou Fogli (story)
- Produced by: Pierre Forette; Grégoire Lassalle
- Starring: Mélanie Bernier; Clovis Cornillac; Lilou Fogli; Philippe Duquesne
- Cinematography: Thierry Pouget
- Edited by: Jean-François Elie
- Music by: Guillaume Roussel
- Production companies: Ciné Nominé; Orange Studio; Chaocorp
- Distributed by: Paramount Pictures & Orange Studio
- Release dates: 26 April 2015 (COLCOA Film Festival); 6 May 2015 (France)
- Running time: 90 minutes
- Country: France
- Language: French
- Budget: $3.9 million
- Box office: $3.6 million

Blind Date (French title: Un peu, beaucoup, aveuglément "A little, a lot, blindly") is a 2015 French romantic comedy film directed by and starring Clovis Cornillac. The film also stars Mélanie Bernier, Lilou Fogli and Philippe Duquesne. It won the audience award at the 19th annual COLCOA French Film Festival in Los Angeles and the Best First Film award at the 2015 Cabourg Film Festival.

== Cast ==
- Mélanie Bernier as Machine ('Whosit')
- Clovis Cornillac as Machin ('Whatsit')
- Lilou Fogli as Charlotte
- Philippe Duquesne as Artus
- Grégoire Oestermann as Evguenie
- Oscar Copp as Dan
- Boris Terral as L'inconnu italien
- Manu Payet as the Picard cashier
- Arnaud Lechien as Paul

== Plot summary ==
A shy woman moves into her new apartment in Paris, helped by her sister Charlotte. She longs to be a professional pianist and has just moved out of the house of her piano teacher, Evguenie. On her first night, she hears strange noises and a picture on her wall begins to move. Fearing a supernatural presence, she flees to Evguenie's house. As a teacher, Evguenie is harsh and critical, encouraging poise and technical perfection over emotion. She returns to her flat the next day and realises that the noises were caused by her neighbour — a quiet and reclusive man, who barely ventures outside and whose only friend is the slovenly, kind Artus. He explains that the wall separating their apartments is hollow and that any noise made in either place can be heard. Not wanting to be disturbed, he regularly scares new tenants away from the flat. The woman refuses to be driven away and proposes making a schedule of when each person is allowed to make noise, an idea the man rejects.

The two live side-by-side, intimidating one another with increasingly creative and noisy behaviour. Eventually after the woman amplifies a metronome for several days, the man relents, and agrees to stop the hostilities and coordinate their schedules. On one occasion while she is practising Chopin's Revolutionary Etude, the man says that her playing lacks emotion, encourages her to let go of her self-consciousness, and to play the piece with real feeling. She follows his instructions, and the two become friends, talking to each other through the wall. The man nicknames her 'Machine' ('Whosit') and the woman nicknames him 'Machin' ('Whatsit'). Machine quickly becomes infatuated with him, running her piano tutoring sessions absentmindedly. While walking in public, Machine attempts to identify Machin based on the rough description he gave her of his appearance and clothing style. She locates a man who matches the description and arranges a date for the two of them at her apartment. Because Machin had told her that he would prefer a dinner in silence, Machine continues the entire date without talking. When Machin arrives home, she immediately realizes that she has guessed incorrectly and forces the man out. The two talk and decide to enter into a romantic relationship, but never meet face-to-face in order to maintain their separate lives. They hold a dinner party with Artus and Charlotte to introduce each other, conversing with the wall separating their two tables.

In preparation for a competition, Machine invites Evguenie to her home for a final lesson. She explains to Machin that Evguenie can be unkind and asks him not to intervene. However, Machin, angered by the way that Evguenie bullies and belittles Machine, ejects Evguenie from the house. Machine is furious and decides that their relationship cannot continue. Machin asks to see her in person, but she refuses. Machin leaves the apartment and talks to Artus about his feelings for her. After hearing that he will not join him to see her recital in person, Artus becomes furious at his lack of persistence, and urges Machin to come lest he lose his perfect opportunity of finding love.

The day of the audition, Charlotte and Artus — unbeknownst to one another — sit in the auditorium to listen. Machine begins to poorly play a piece by Mendelssohn, but Machin, secretly listening from behind a wall at the back of the stage, is discovered by an employee and causes a disturbance. Machin reveals himself and yells for her to let go, to play with passion. The judges, unimpressed by her wooden performance, order her offstage and call for the next participant.

Machine dramatically removes her ponytail, shakes her hair, and stubbornly begins on a new piece. She plays Chopin with emotion and talent, impressing the judges. After the performance, Artus and Charlotte realise each other's identities and are immediately attracted, leaving together in a cab. Evguenie comments disdainfully on her performance. Angered by his continued negativity, Machine head-butts him. She returns to her apartment and confesses to Machin that she wished that she could have seen him after the performance — and that she wishes they could be together in reality. After prolonged silence Machine wonders if he is even there. Suddenly, Machin knocks through the wall to her apartment; they finally see each other for the first time, and kiss.

== Remake ==
- 2023: South Korean remake My Worst Neighbor (Korean: 빈틈없는 사이) (translating as “A Close Relationship”), directed by Lee Woo-cheol starring Lee Ji-hoon and Han Seung-yeon, was released on July 5, 2023.
- 2024: Spanish remake Love, Divided (Spanish: Pared con pared) (translating as "Wall to Wall"), directed by Patricia Font and written by Marta Sánchez starring Aitana and Fernando Guallar, was released on Netflix on April 12, 2024.
