= Verónica Echegui =

Spanish actress (1983–2025)

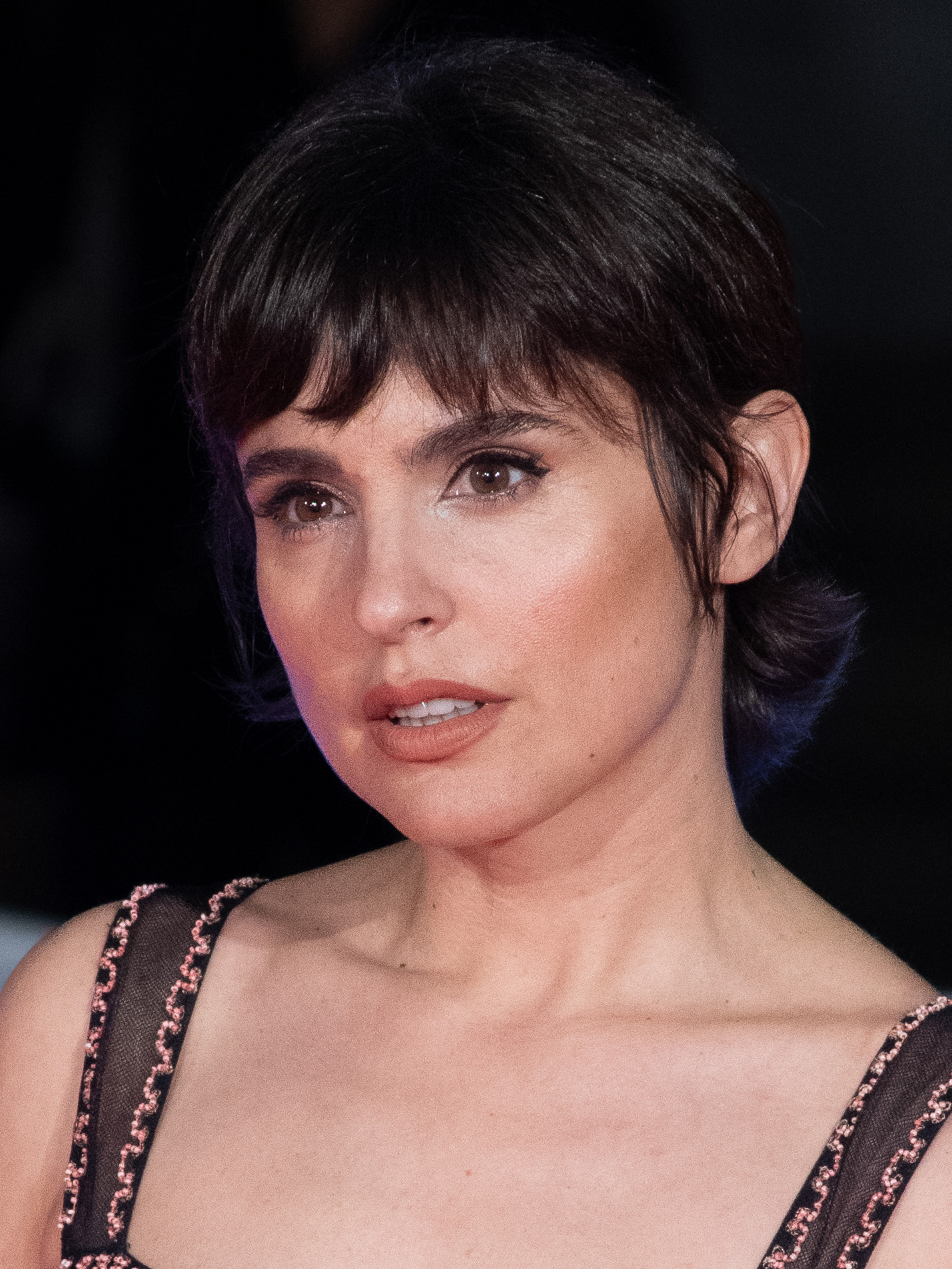
- Echegui in 2024
- Born: Verónica Fernández Echegaray; 16 June 1983; Madrid, Spain
- Died: 24 August 2025 (aged 42); Madrid, Spain
- Education: Real Escuela Superior de Arte Dramático; Royal Academy of Dramatic Art
- Occupations: Actress; film director
- Years active: 2003–2025
- Partner: Álex García (c. 2010–2023)
- Relatives: José Echegaray

Verónica Fernández Echegaray (16 June 1983 – 24 August 2025), known professionally as Verónica Echegui (Spanish: [beˈɾonika eˈtʃeɣi]), was a Spanish actress. After making her feature film debut as the title character of the 2006 drama My Name Is Juani, she appeared in films such as My Prison Yard (2008), Six Points About Emma (2010), Kathmandu Lullaby (2012), The Cold Light of Day (2012), Family United (2013), You're Killing Me Susana (2016), The Hunter's Prayer (2017), Unknown Origins (2020), My Heart Goes Boom! (2020), The Offering (2020), Book of Love (2022), Yo no soy esa (2024), and Artificial Justice (2024).

Echegui also featured in television series such as Fortitude (2015–2017), Trust (2018), Intimacy (2022), and Love You to Death (2025).

In 2020, her short film and directorial debut Tótem Loba was released; it won the Best Short Film at the Goya Awards in 2022. She was the recipient of several accolades for acting merits, including four Goya Award nominations and two Gaudí Awards.

== Early life ==
Verónica Fernández Echegaray was born in Madrid on 16 June 1983. Her father is a lawyer and her mother a civil servant. She took the entrance exams for the Real Escuela Superior de Arte Dramático, landing her television role in Paco y Veva two years after entering the school. Moving to London, she trained at the Royal Academy of Dramatic Arts, while working as a waitress.

== Career ==
Echegui landed her first television work with a minor role in the series Una nueva vida, followed by an appearance in the series Paco y Veva. In 2005, she did theatre work in Tomaž Pandur's play Infierno, which was staged at the Teatro María Guerrero. For her big screen debut, Echegui starred in Bigas Luna's My Name Is Juani, portraying the title character, an 18-year-old woman who moves to Madrid to pursue her dreams of becoming an actress. After being told by her agent that Bigas Luna was looking to cast an average Jane in the role instead of an actress, Echegui attended the first casting call for the film pretending not to be an actress. Reviewing for Variety, Jonathan Holland assessed that Echegui "revels in the role of the raspy-voiced, short-skirted and irrepressibly vulgar Juani, the character who comes closest to winning viewers' hearts". Despite the film's mixed reviews, it landed her a nomination for the Goya Award for Best New Actress and launched her career.

Early roles also include her appearance in the TV movie Un difunto, seis mujeres y un taller. She went on to star in The Lesser Evil (2007) along with Carmen Maura and Roberto Álvarez as the temperamental lover of a right-wing politician. Likewise, the film 8 Dates, presented at the 2008 Málaga Film Festival, gave her the opportunity to try her hand at comedy. She also trained to acquire an Argentine accent for her role in the Basque conflict-themed film La casa de mi padre (2008), which premiered at the San Sebastián International Film Festival.

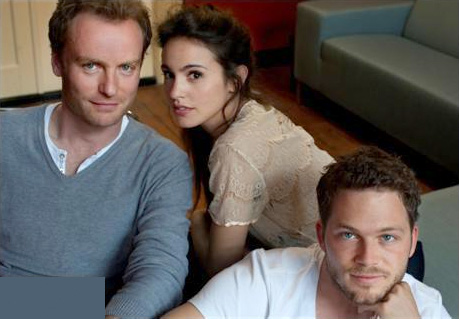
Echegui together with fellow &Me co-stars Mark Waschke and Teun Luijkx

Echegui's portrayal of a "gutsy, streetwise" convict seeking redemption in the prison drama My Prison Yard (2008) won her her first nomination for the Goya Award for Best Actress.

The European Film Promotion Jury selected Echegui as one of ten up-and-coming European actors to receive the 2009 Shooting Stars Award. In 2009, she co-starred in the British comedy Bunny and the Bull as a lively Spanish waitress, her first international film appearance.

In 2012, Craig Mathieson wrote in The Age: "In Roberto Perez Toledo's romantic drama Six Points about Emma she plays a confident blind woman, while for Manuel Martín Cuenca's sparsely atmospheric Half of Oscar she is a silent, recessive sibling circling her estranged brother, and in Icíar Bollaín's Kathmandu Lullaby she displays a forthright passion as a teacher trying to help abandoned children in Nepal." She also played a part in the Madrid-set spy thriller The Cold Light of Day (2012), which received negative feedback from critics and audiences alike. She portrayed a woman in a love triangle in the ensemble comedy Family United (2013), set against the backdrop of the 2010 FIFA World Cup final.

In 2016, she co-starred as an aspiring novelist opposite to Gael García Bernal in the Mexican film You're Killing Me Susana, and along with David Verdaguer and Álex García in a love triangle in the romantic comedy Don't Blame the Karma for Being an Idiot, after prior cast choice Clara Lago withdrew from the project. Echegui was invited to membership in the AMPAS in 2018.

In 2020, Echegui co-starred in the jukebox musical comedy My Heart Goes Boom!, featuring songs by Raffaella Carrà. She portrayed Amparo, a character noted for her Murcian Spanish accent. For her supporting role in the film she landed another Goya nomination, as well as a Feroz Award for Best Supporting Actress in a Film. Echegui went on to win the Gaudí Award for Best Supporting Actress for her role in The Offering (2020), a drama halfway between "Greek tragedy and psychological thriller" playing a deeply traumatised woman surrounded by toxic relationships. Echegui stated that had "never done anything so 'obsessive', so to speak, but at the same time, that's what attracted me most when I read the script". She also portrayed hard-boiled cop and cosplay-loving Norma in Unknown Origins.

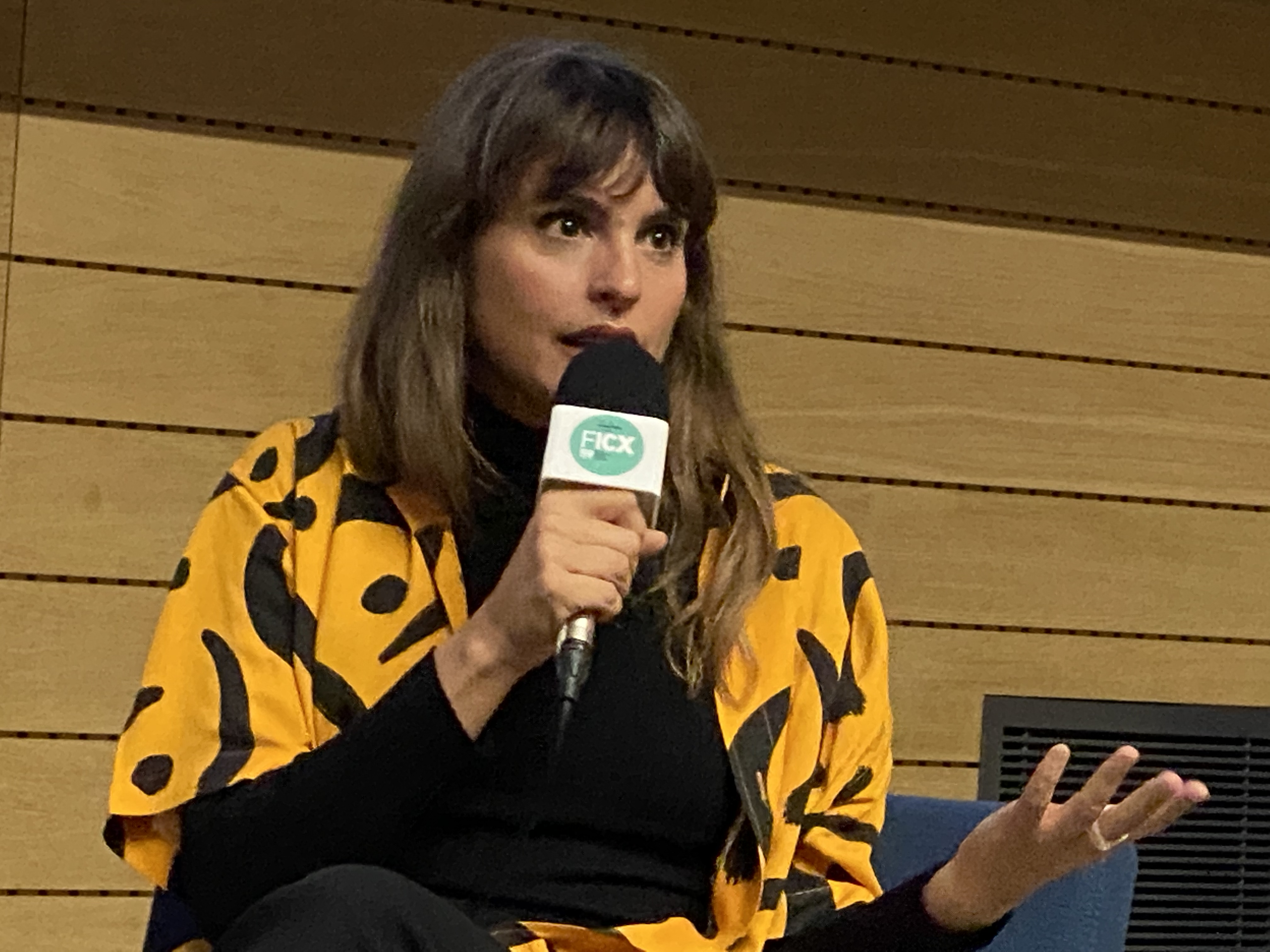
Echegui presenting her short film Tótem Loba in a panel during the 2021 Gijón International Film Festival.

In 2021, she debuted as a director with the short film Tótem loba, which won her the Goya Award for Best Fictional Short Film. The short film's story tackled structural gender-based violence. She appeared in the 2022 drama miniseries Intimacy, playing a factory worker in a vulnerable situation who commits suicide after the disclosure of a sexual video featuring her, and in the 2023 historical drama miniseries The Patients of Dr. García as a Falangist woman from a wealthy family. In 2024, she starred in the coming-of-age comedy Yo no soy esa, and as a judge in Artificial Justice, a thriller set in a near future delving on the meddling of artificial intelligence in the justice system.

In 2025, Echegui starred in the romantic comedy series Love You To Death. Her work in the series Ciudad de sombras, and in Sara Sálamo's film Hortelana, will be released posthumously.

== Personal life and death ==
Echegui was a relative of José Echegaray and Miguel Echegaray. She was fluent in Spanish, Italian and English. After meeting in the Canary Islands during the filming of Six Points About Emma in 2010 and up until 2023, she was in a relationship with actor Álex García.

Echegui died of cancer at Hospital 12 de Octubre in Madrid, on 24 August 2025, at the age of 42. Several colleagues, including Sara Sálamo, Silvia Alonso, Susana Abaitua, Vicky Luengo, Dafne Fernández, Elisa Matilla, and Paco León, attended her lying in repose at the La Paz funeral home in Alcobendas.

In December 2025, she was posthumously bestowed the Gold Medal of Merit in the Fine Arts.

== Filmography ==
=== Film ===
Year	Title	Role	Notes	Ref.
2006	Yo soy la Juani (My Name Is Juani)	Juani		
2007	El menor de los males (The Lesser Evil)	Vanesa		
2007	Tocar el cielo (Touch the Sky)	Elena		
2008	8 citas (8 Dates)	Vane		
2008	El patio de mi cárcel (My Prison Yard)	Isa		
2008	La casa de mi padre	Sara		
2009	Bunny and the Bull	Eloisa		
2010	La mitad de Óscar (Half of Oscar)	María		
2011	Verbo	Medussa		
2011	Seis puntos sobre Emma (Six Points About Emma)	Emma		
2012	Katmandú, un espejo en el cielo (Kathmandu Lullaby)	Laia		
2012	The Cold Light of Day	Lucia		
2013	&ME	Edurne		
2013	La gran familia española (Family United)	Cris		
2014	Kamikaze	Nancy		
2016	Me estás matando, Susana (You're Killing Me Susana)	Susana		
2016	No culpes al karma de lo que te pasa por gilipollas (Don't Blame the Karma for Being an Idiot)	Sara		
2017	La niebla y la doncella (The Mist and the Maiden)	Ruth Anglada		
2017	Lasciati andare (Let Yourself Go)	Claudia		
2017	The Hunter's Prayer	Dani		
2020	Orígenes secretos (Unknown Origins)	Norma		
2020	L'ofrena (The Offering)	Rita		
2020	Explota explota (My Heart Goes Boom!)	Amparo		
2021	Donde caben dos (More the Merrier)	Ana		
2022	Book of Love	Maria Rodríguez		
2022	Historias para no contar (Stories Not to Be Told)	Sofía		
2022	Objetos (Lost & Found)	Helena		
2024	Yo no soy esa	Susana		
2024	Justicia artificial (Artificial Justice)	Carmen Costa		

=== Television ===
Year	Title	Role	Notes	Ref.
2003	Una nueva vida			
2004	Paco y Veva	Isa		
2014	Cuéntame cómo pasó	Cristina		
2015–17	Fortitude	Elena Ledesma		
2017	Apaches	Carol		
2018	Trust	Luciana		
2018	Paquita Salas	Edurne Bengoetxea		
2021	3 caminos	Raquel		
2022	Intimidad (Intimacy)	Ane		
2023	Los pacientes del doctor García (The Patients of Dr. García)	Amparo Priego		
2025	A muerte (Love You to Death)	Marta		
2025	Ciudad de sombras (City of Shadows)	Rebeca Garrido		

== Accolades ==
Year	Award	Category	Work	Result	Ref.
2007	62nd CEC Medals	Best Newcomer	My Name Is Juani	Nominated	
2007	21st Goya Awards	Best New Actress	My Name Is Juani	Nominated	
2007	51st Sant Jordi Awards	Best Spanish Actress	My Name Is Juani	Won	
2007	16th Actors and Actresses Union Awards	Best New Actress	My Name Is Juani	Nominated	
2007	10th Málaga Film Festival	Best Supporting Actress	The Lesser Evil	Won	
2009	64th CEC Medals	Best Actress	My Prison Yard	Nominated	
2009	23rd Goya Awards	Best Actress	My Prison Yard	Nominated	
2012	4th Gaudí Awards	Best Actress	Kathmandu Lullaby	Won	
2012	26th Goya Awards	Best Actress	Kathmandu Lullaby	Nominated	
2013	68th CEC Medals	Best Actress	Kathmandu Lullaby	Nominated	
2014	1st Feroz Awards	Best Supporting Actress	Family United	Nominated	
2014	69th CEC Medals	Best Supporting Actress	Family United	Nominated	
2014	23rd Actors and Actresses Union Awards	Best Film Actress in a Secondary Role	Family United	Nominated	
2021	76th CEC Medals	Best Supporting Actress	My Heart Goes Boom!	Nominated	
2021	8th Feroz Awards	Best Supporting Actress	My Heart Goes Boom!	Won	
2021	35th Goya Awards	Best Supporting Actress	My Heart Goes Boom!	Nominated	
2021	13th Gaudí Awards	Best Supporting Actress	The Offering	Won	
2023	10th Platino Awards	Best Supporting Actress in a Miniseries or TV Series	Intimacy	Nominated	
2026	27th Iris Awards	Best Actress	Love You to Death	Nominated	
