= Roger Louret =

French actor, playwright, and theatre director (1950–2023)

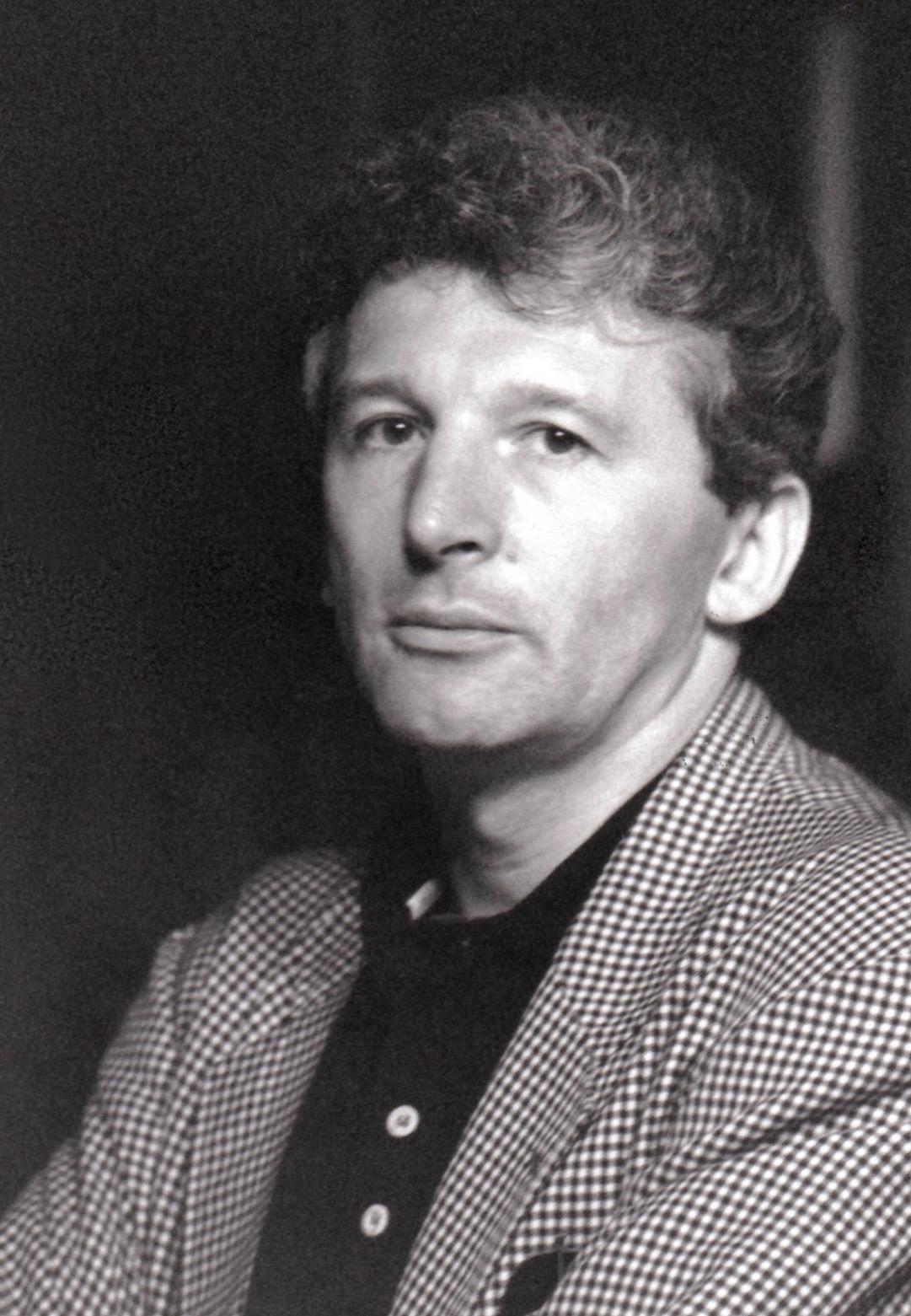
- Louret in 1995
- Born: 20 May 1950; Coulx, France
- Died: 25 January 2023 (aged 72); Villeneuve-sur-Lot, France
- Education: Toulouse Conservatory School
- Occupations: Actor; Playwright; Theatre director

Roger Louret (20 May 1950 – 25 January 2023) was a French actor, playwright, and theatre director.

== Biography ==
Born in Coulx on 20 May 1950, Louret entered the Toulouse Conservatory School in 1970, where he was a pupil of Simone Turck, Jean Bousquet, and Raymond Girard. He was the founder and artistic director of the theatre company Les Baladins en Agenais. In 1985, he created La Nuit du Théâtre, followed by La Nuit des Hélènes in 1987 and La Nuit de l’Histoire in 1989. In 1995, he was awarded a Molière Award of the musical show for Les Années Twist at the Folies Bergère. Throughout his career, he directed the likes of Catherine Alcover, Sophie Artur, Grégori Baquet, and Stéphanie Bataille.

Louret died in Villeneuve-sur-Lot on 25 January 2023, at the age of 72.
