= Artificial Justice =

2024 Spanish-Portuguese sci-fi political thriller film

- Spanish: Justicia artificial
- Directed by: Simón Casal
- Written by: Simón Casal; Víctor Sierra
- Produced by: Mariela Besuievsky; Gerardo Herrero; Chelo Loureiro
- Starring: Verónica Echegui; Tamar Novas; Alba Galocha; Alberto Ammann
- Cinematography: Diego Cabezas
- Edited by: Irene Blecua
- Music by: Sofia Oriana
- Production companies: Tornasol Media; Abano Produciones; Ukbar Filmes
- Distributed by: A Contracorriente Films
- Release dates: June 2024 (SIFF); 13 September 2024 (Spain)
- Running time: 98 minutes
- Countries: Spain; Portugal
- Language: Spanish

Artificial Justice (Spanish: Justicia artificial) is a 2024 Spanish-Portuguese science fiction political thriller film directed by Simón Casal from a screenplay by Casal and Víctor Sierra. It stars Verónica Echegui, Tamar Novas, Alba Galocha and Alberto Ammann.

== Plot ==
In 2028, in Spain, an artificial intelligence system called THENTE 1 serves as an aid to judges. However, the government calls a referendum for this artificial intelligence to be fully implemented in the Administration of Justice, effectively replacing judges, in order to automate and depoliticize justice. Carmen Costa, a renowned judge, is invited to work on the development of the project, but the sudden disappearance of Alicia Kóvack, creator of the system, causes great distrust in her, to the point of understanding that she is discovering the tip of the iceberg of a conspiracy that aims to control, from justice, an entire country.

== Cast ==
- Verónica Echegui as judge Carmen Costa
- Tamar Novas as Brais Lago
- Alba Galocha as Alicia Kóvack
- Alberto Ammann as Alex
- Lúcia Moniz as Sofía
- Paula Morado as Manuela
- Santi Prego as Goitia
- Ledicia Sola

== Production ==
The film was produced by Justicia Artificial AIE, Tornasol Media, Abano Produciones and Ukbar Filmes, with the participation of RTVE and Prime Video, and the support of ICAA and AGADIC.

In November 2022, RTVE reported the beginning of filming in Galicia. Additional footage was shot in Lisbon.

== Release ==
The film had its world premiere at the 26th Shanghai International Film Festival (June 2024). It was released theatrically in Spain on 13 September 2024 with A Contracorriente Films overseeing domestic distribution.

== See also ==
- List of Spanish films of 2024
- Artificial Intelligence
- Administration of justice
