= Marie Besnard =

20th century accused serial poisoner

- Marie Besnard c. 1952
- Born: Marie Joséphine Philippine Davaillaud; August 15, 1896; Loudun, France
- Died: February 14, 1980 (aged 83)
- Other name: The Good Lady of Loudun
- Known for: accused serial poisoner finally acquitted

Marie Besnard (15 August 1896 – 14 February 1980), also known as The Good Lady of Loudun, was a convicted murderer and accused serial poisoner in the mid-20th century.

Besnard was first charged with multiple murder on July 21, 1949, under her maiden name, Marie Joséphine Philippine Davaillaud. After three trials lasting over ten years (the first held in Poitiers), Besnard was finally freed in 1954, then acquitted on December 12, 1961. The case attracted widespread attention throughout the country and remains one of the most enigmatic in modern French legal history.

== Early life ==
Born in Loudun, France, Marie married her cousin, Auguste Antigny, in 1920. The marriage lasted until his death from pleurisy on July 21, 1927 (Antigny was known to suffer from tuberculosis). When his body was eventually exhumed, 60 mg of arsenic were found in his remains.

In 1928, Marie married Léon Besnard.

== Suspicious deaths ==
When Léon Besnard's parents inherited family wealth, the couple invited them to move in with them. Soon thereafter, his father died, apparently from eating poisoned mushrooms.

His mother followed three months later, apparently a victim of pneumonia. The parents' estate was left to Besnard's husband and his sister, Lucie, who supposedly committed suicide a few months later. Around this time, on May 14, 1940, Marie Besnard's father Pierre Davaillaud also died, officially due to cerebral haemorrhage, although his exhumed remains contained 36 mg of arsenic.

Shortly afterward, the Besnards sublet rooms to a wealthy childless couple, the Rivets, who were friends of Marie's husband. Monsieur Toussaint Rivet died of pneumonia on July 14, 1939, although 18 mg of arsenic were later discovered in his exhumed remains. Madame Blanche Rivet (née Lebeau) died on December 27, 1941, from aortitis, although her remains contained 30 mg of arsenic. The Rivets' will had named Marie Besnard as their only heir.

Pauline Bodineau, (née Lalleron) and Virginie Lalleron, cousins of Marie, had also named Marie as their only beneficiary. Pauline died aged 88 on July 1, 1945, after mistaking a bowl of lye for her dessert one night. Her remains were later found to contain 48 mg of arsenic. Virginie apparently made the same mistake a week later and died aged 83 on July 9, 1945. Her remains were later found to contain 20 mg of arsenic.

After Marie discovered Léon was having an affair, Léon remarked to a close friend, Madame Pintou, that he believed he was being poisoned, saying "that his wife had served him some soup on a bowl that already contained a liquid." He died shortly afterwards October 25, 1947 apparently of uremia.

A few days after Léon's burial, details of his testimony reached the gendarmerie and were passed to an investigating magistrate. Marie's mother, Marie-Louise Davaillaud (née Antigny) died on January 16 1949. Her remains contained 48 mg of arsenic.

As Marie had by now also accumulated most of the wealth of both families, suspicions were aroused of foul play and the magistrate ordered the exhumation of Léon's body on May 11, 1949. A forensic surgeon, doctor Béroud, discovered 19.45 mg of arsenic in his body. Marie was arrested, the bodies of her other alleged victims were exhumed, and Marie was charged with thirteen counts of murder.

== Trials ==
The presence of arsenic in the bodies of her alleged victims was central to Besnard's trials, the first of which began in February 1952.

Béroud's autopsy report, based on an analytical method developed by Marsh and Cribier, concluded that the victims had been slowly poisoned by arsenic. Further analysis by professors Fabre, Kohn-Abrest and Griffon also found that there were abnormal levels of arsenic in the exhumed bodies. Another report, carried out by professor Piedelièvre in 1954 confirmed the results of the 1952 analysis, but differed in some respects from Béroud's. The presence of abnormally high levels of arsenic were also confirmed by another report by Professor Frédéric Joliot-Curie.

Béroud had difficulty in defending his results under examination from Besnard's lawyers. The defence also claimed that there were errors in the labelling of the jars containing the tissue sample, and that several jars had been lost or replaced. In addition, an investigation at the cemetery was able to show that arsenic may have leached into the soil and bodies from chemicals used on the flowers and from zinc ornaments and other sources. As a result, the first two trials ended without a conviction.

The length of the trials, the successful attacks on the evidence, and the turning of public opinion in favor of Marie Besnard contributed to her eventual acquittal at her third trial in 1961.

Besnard died in 1980.

== In popular culture ==
The 1986 television film L'Affaire Marie Besnard (The Marie Besnard Affair) won the Sept d'or French television awards for Alice Sapritch, best actress in the role of Marie Besnard; Yves-André Hubert, director, for best movie made for TV; and Frédéric Pottecher, best writer. The 2006 television film Marie Besnard, l'empoisonneuse (Marie Besnard, the Poisoner), resulted in the 2007 Best Performance by an Actress Emmy Award for Muriel Robin in the title role.

The English historian Richard Cobb presents a sympathetic portrait of Besnard in a lengthy essay in his book about French life, A Second Identity (1969).

== See also ==
- List of serial killers by number of victims
