= Love, Divided =

- Promotional release poster
- Spanish: Pared con pared
- Directed by: Patricia Font
- Written by: Marta Sánchez
- Based on: Blind Date by Clovis Cornillac, Tristan Schulmann, Mathieu Oullion, and Lilou Fogli
- Starring: Aitana Ocaña; Fernando Guallar
- Music by: Arnau Bataller
- Production companies: Tripictures; Second Gen Pictures; Blind Date Productions
- Distributed by: Netflix
- Release date: 12 April 2024
- Running time: 98 min
- Country: Spain
- Language: Spanish

Love, Divided (Spanish: Pared con pared) is a 2024 Spanish romantic comedy film directed by Patricia Font and written by Marta Sánchez starring Aitana Ocaña and Fernando Guallar. It is a remake of 2015 French film Blind Date based on an original story by Lilou Fogli.

== Plot ==
Upon moving to a new apartment, pianist Valentina clashes with her next-wall neighbor and game developer David as she makes too much noise and reclusive and sullen David requires silence for his work. But they will find a compromise and love will find a way.

== Cast ==
- Aitana as Valentina
- Fernando Guallar as David
- Natalia Rodríguez
- Adam Jezierski
- Paco Tous
- Miguel Ángel Muñoz

== Production ==
Originally known under the working title Tras la pared (transl. 'Behind the wall') and written by Marta Sánchez, the film is a remake of the 2015 French comedy film Un peu, beaucoup, aveuglément!, aka Blind Date. The film is a Tripictures, Second Gen Pictures, and Blind Date Productions production. Filming began in May 2022. Shooting locations included La Latina (Madrid). The film was later renamed to Pared con pared (transl. 'Wall to wall').

== Release ==
Love, Divided was released on Netflix on 12 April 2024.

== Reception ==
American review aggregator Rotten Tomatoes reports a 57% approval rating based on 7 reviews from critics with an average score of 5.1/10.

Desirée de Fez of El Periódico de Catalunya rated the film 3 out of 5 stars, writing that while "the plot development is predictable and the dialogues are often embarrassing", the premise has "charm", Font's direction is "more than correct", and Aitana underpins the film "with no apparent difficulty".

Liz Kocan of Decider.com gave the film a positive recommendation deeming it to be "a hidden gem, a romantic fantasy that's broad and appealing, not too heavy on the farce or mistaken identities, and hits just the right notes".

Javier Cazallas of HobbyConsolas scored the film with 73 points ('good') considering it "a charming, simple romantic comedy".

Enid Román Almansa rated the film 3 out of 5 stars, deeming it to be "a small step for Aitana, a large success for Netflix" in the verdict.

Beatriz Martínez of Infobae deemed the film to be a "prefabricated product whose only enticement is the appearance of a centennial star who does not know how to act".

== See also ==
- List of Spanish films of 2024
