= Cool Books =

- Theatrical release poster
- Spanish: Casi todo bien
- Directed by: Andrés Salmoyraghi; Rafael López Saubidet
- Written by: Rafael López Saubidet; Ricardo Uhagón Vivas
- Starring: Marcel Borràs; Silma López; Lorenzo Ferro; Julián Villagrán; Secun de la Rosa; Adelfa Calvo
- Cinematography: Christos Voudouris
- Edited by: David López
- Music by: Ezequiel Flehner
- Production companies: Cool Books Movies; Bondi Stories; Emedia Canary Projects; AF Canary Islands
- Distributed by: AF Pictures
- Release dates: 7 March 2026 (Málaga); 24 April 2026 (Spain)
- Country: Spain
- Language: Spanish

Cool Books (Spanish: Casi todo bien, lit. 'almost everything is fine') is a 2026 Spanish comedy-drama film directed by Andrés Salmoyraghi and Rafael López Saubidet and written by López Saubidet and Ricardo Uhagón Vivas. It stars Marcel Borràs and Silma López alongside Lorenzo Ferro, Julián Villagrán, Secun de la Rosa, and Adelfa Calvo.

== Plot ==
The plot is set in Madrid. 40-year-old wannabe novelist Hilario earns a living by working at the Andrea-owned small bookstore La Ménsula, while embracing a cynical and indifferent persona. After Andrea's decision to sell the premises and upon meeting a girl at a party, his monotonous life is upended.

== Cast ==
- Marcel Borràs as Hilario
- Lorenzo Ferro as Pabli
- Silma López as Carolina
- Secun de la Rosa as Hugo Madrigal
- Adelfa Calvo as Andrea
- Julián Villagrán as Toni

== Production ==
The filmmakers billed their film as a "love letter to books" as well as a late "coming-of-age". Cool Books is a Cool Books Movies, Bondi Stories, Emedia Canary Projects and AF Canary Islands production.

== Release ==
Crew and cast members attending the 2026 Málaga Film Festival

The film was presented in a RTVE gala at the 29th Málaga Film Festival on 7 March 2026. It is scheduled to be released theatrically in Spain on 24 April 2026h.

== Reception ==
In a 3-star rating, Manuel J. Lombardo of Diario de Sevilla assessed that the film manages to go beyond the caricature and present itself as a "fresh and charming feel-good movie".

Oti Rodríguez Marchante of ABC gave the film 3 stars, always welcoming any film "that turns bitterness into enjoyment through clever humour".

Pere Vall of Fotogramas rated the film 3 out of 5 stars, highlighting the fresh chemistry of the couple formed by Borràs and López as the best thing about it.

== See also ==
- List of Spanish films of 2026
