= The Vineyard (Spanish TV series) =

Spanish romantic drama television series

- La templanza
- Genre: Romantic drama Period drama
- Based on: La templanza by María Dueñas
- Screenplay by: Susana López Rubio; Javier Holgado
- Directed by: Guillem Morales; Alberto Ruiz Rojo; Patricia Font
- Starring: Leonor Watling; Rafael Novoa; Emilio Gutiérrez Caba; Juana Acosta
- Country of origin: Spain
- Original languages: Spanish; English
- No. of seasons: 1
- No. of episodes: 10

Production
- Executive producers: Sonia Martínez; Nacho Manubens; Tedy Villalba; José María Caro
- Running time: 50 minutes
- Production companies: Atresmedia Studios; Boomerang TV

Original release
- Network: Amazon Prime Video
- Release: 26 March 2021

The Vineyard (Spanish: La templanza; lit. 'The Temperance') is a Spanish romantic drama television limited series produced by Atresmedia Studios and Boomerang TV for Amazon Prime Video starring Leonor Watling, Rafael Novoa, Emilio Gutiérrez Caba and Juana Acosta. It is an adaptation of the novel of the same name by María Dueñas. It was released on 26 March 2021.

== Premise ==
Set in the 1860s, the fiction moves across different locations such as Cádiz, Mexico City, London, and Havana. The plot tracks the love story between Mauro Larrea (Rafael Novoa) and Soledad Montalvo (Leonor Watling), a refined woman belonging to a noted winemaking family from Jerez.

== Cast ==
- Leonor Watling as Soledad Montalvo
  - Carla Campra as young Soledad Montalvo
- Rafael Novoa as Mauro Larrea
- Juana Acosta as Carola Gorostiza
- Emilio Gutiérrez Caba as Don Matías Montalvo
- Esmeralda Pimentel as Mariana Larrea
- Nathaniel Parker as Edward Clayton
- Alejandro de la Madrid as Elías Andrade
- Raúl Briones as Santos Huesos
- Ignacio Mateos as Luis el Comino
- Javier Beltrán as Gustavo Zayas
- Henry Pettigrew as Alan Clayton
- Bella Agossou as Trinidad.
- Jose Roberto Diaz as Ernesto Gorostiza (Episode 2)

== Production and release ==
The series is produced by Buendía Estudios in collaboration with Boomerang TV. It was shot in Tenerife, Madrid, Dublin, London and Jerez. In February 2021, Amazon Prime Video disclosed the intended release date set for 26 March 2021. Guillem Morales, Alberto Ruiz Rojo and Patricia Font directed the episodes, whereas Sonia Martínez, Nacho Manubens, Tedy Villalba and José María Caro are credited as executive producers. The screenplay adapting the original novel by María Dueñas was authored by Susana López Rubio and Javier Holgado. The series consists of 10 episodes with a running time of around 50 minutes.
