= Six Points About Emma =

2011 Spanish film by Roberto Pérez Toledo

- Theatrical release poster
- Directed by: Roberto Pérez Toledo
- Screenplay by: Roberto Pérez Toledo; Peter Andermatt
- Starring: Verónica Echegui; Fernando Tielve; Álex García
- Cinematography: Juan Antonio Castaño
- Edited by: José Manuel Jiménez
- Music by: David Cordero
- Production companies: La Mirada Producciones; Canarias Cultura en Red; Televisión Canaria; Generación 78
- Distributed by: Alta Classics
- Release dates: 25 November 2011 (Canary Islands); 11 May 2012 (Spain)
- Country: Spain
- Language: Spanish

Six Points About Emma (Spanish: Seis puntos sobre Emma) is a 2011 Spanish comedy-drama film directed by Roberto Pérez Toledo. It stars Verónica Echegui as Emma, a selfish and manipulative blind woman hellbent on getting pregnant, alongside Fernando Tielve and Álex García.

== Plot ==
The plot follows Emma, a blind woman about to turn 30, who leaves her boyfriend over the latter's inability to father a child with her. To that end, she hooks up with Germán, a psychiatrist running a therapy for the disabled who is also taking advantage of her, videotaping their sexual activities. Nonetheless, love eventually shows up.

== Cast ==
- Verónica Echegui as Emma
- Álex García as Germán
- Fernando Tielve as Diego
- Nacho Aldeguer as Ricky
- Mariam Hernández as Lucía
- Blanca Rodríguez as Reina
- Paloma Soroa as Lidia
- Mabel del Pozo as Ángela
- Soledad Melián as Rita
- Antonio Hernández as Chico Sordo
- Beatriz López as Eli
- Antonio Velázquez as Jorge

== Production ==
The screenplay was penned by Roberto Pérez Toledo and Peter Andermatt. The film was produced by La Mirada Producciones, Canarias Cultura en Red, and Generación 78 in association with Televisión Canaria. Shooting began on 29 November 2010. It was shot in Tenerife, including the consultation facilities of the Hospital Universitario de Canarias.

== Release ==
A pre-screening in Lanzarote, Tenerife and Gran Canaria was scheduled for 25 November 2011. The film was also included in the lineup of the 15th Málaga Film Festival's Zonacine section. Distributed by Alta Classics, the film received a wide theatrical release in Spain on 11 May 2012.

== Reception ==
Pere Vall of Fotogramas rated the film 3 out of 5 stars, highlighting Echegui and her acting flexibility as the best thing about the film.

Sergio F. Pinilla of Cinemanía rated the film 3 1/2 out of 5 stars, considering that Pérez Toledo "reveals himself as a wonderful scriptwriter and director of actors", "gifted with a special sensitivity to dissect human relationships".

Lluís Bonet Mojica of La Vanguardia wrote of the film that, "far from stereotypical, and with remarkable performances, it falters at the end".

== See also ==
- List of Spanish films of 2012
