= My Name Is Juani =

- Theatrical release poster
- Original title: Yo soy la Juani
- Directed by: Bigas Luna
- Screenplay by: Carmen Chaves Gastaldo; Bigas Luna
- Starring: Verónica Echegui; Dani Martín; Laya Martí; Gorka Lasaosa; José Chaves
- Cinematography: Albert Pascual
- Edited by: Jaume Martí
- Music by: Facto Delafé; Horta & Petruchelli; Professor Angel Dust; Miguel Marín
- Production companies: Media Films; Virgili Films
- Distributed by: Manga Films
- Release date: 20 October 2006
- Running time: 100 minutes
- Country: Spain
- Language: Spanish

My Name Is Juani (Spanish: Yo soy la Juani) is a 2006 Spanish drama film directed by Bigas Luna. Verónica Echegui stars as the title character alongside Dani Martín and Laya Martí.

== Plot ==
Juani comes from a very poor background, having grown up in a slummy neighborhood of Tarragona. She has problems at home and argues incessantly with her boyfriend, with whom she has been since she was 15. Soon his infidelity and overall uselessness, as well as the limitations of her poor and small town, become unbearable for Juani, a girl with big dreams and aspirations. She and her best friend leave for Madrid in search of a better life. At first the big city, a complete opposite of their hometown, couldn't seem to be a better place for their adolescent expectations of life. But their naïve dreams are soon shattered by the ruthlessness of their dream city. In a visit home Juani almost decides she will not return to Madrid, and will instead come back to old relationships and live again in her parents' house. She expresses these sentiments to her mother who tells her that she loves Juani's father, but always asks herself what her life would have been like had she left, like Juani. After speaking to her mother Juani realizes that she can not give up just because she has been having a hard time in Madrid. In a tearful finale, she decides to return to Madrid with less naïve expectations, hoping to escape the abusive relationship she has with her boyfriend and the future she would have were she to stay in her town. The moral of the story becomes clear: never forget what you set out to get, despite the struggles that come your way, and never give up on your dreams.

== Cast ==
- Verónica Echegui as Juani
- Dani Martín as Jonah
- Laya Martí as Vane
- Gorka Lasaosa as Nacho
- José Chaves as Padre de Juani
- Mercedes Hoyos as Madre de Juani
- Manuel Santiago as Raúl
- Marcos Campos as Marcos
- Ferran Madico as Productor Olavarria

== Production ==
The screenplay was penned by Carmen Chaves Gastaldo and Bigas Luna. The film was produced by Media Films and Virgili Films, in association with TVE and TVC.

== Release ==
Distributed by Manga Films, the film was theatrically released in Spain on 20 October 2006.

== Accolades ==
Year	Award	Category	Nominee(s)	Result	Ref.
2007	21st Goya Awards	Best New Actress	Verónica Echegui	Nominated	
2007	51st Sant Jordi Awards	Best Spanish Actress	Verónica Echegui	Won	
2007	16th Actors and Actresses Union Awards	Best New Actress	Verónica Echegui	Nominated	

== See also ==
- List of Spanish films of 2006

== Bibliography ==
- Loxham, Abigail (2016). ""Sí valgo, yo valgo seguro" Spain's new peripheral female subjects in Yo soy la Juani". Studies in Spanish & Latin-American Cinemas. 13 (1): 79–92. doi:10.1386/slac.13.1.79_1.
- Sarabia, Carolina (2010). "La primera y la última aventura de Bigas Luna: En los lindes de lo marginal". Revista Espiga. 9 (20). Universidad Estatal a Distancia: 101–115. ISSN 1409-4002.
