= The Tenderness =

- Theatrical release poster
- Spanish: La ternura
- Directed by: Vicente Villanueva
- Screenplay by: Vicente Villanueva
- Based on: La ternura by Alfredo Sanzol
- Starring: Emma Suárez; Gonzalo de Castro; Alexandra Jiménez; Fernando Guallar; Anna Moliner; Carlos Cuevas
- Cinematography: Luis Ángel Pérez
- Edited by: José Manuel Jiménez
- Music by: Fernando Velázquez
- Production companies: Priss&Batty; La Ternura la película AIE; Bahía Carey
- Distributed by: Universal Pictures International Spain
- Release dates: 25 September 2023 (Paterna); 29 September 2023 (Spain)
- Countries: Spain; Dominican Republic
- Language: Spanish

The Tenderness (Spanish: La ternura) is a 2023 Spanish-Dominican fantasy comedy film directed and written by Vicente Villanueva based on the play by Alfredo Sanzol which stars Emma Suárez, Gonzalo de Castro, Alexandra Jiménez, Fernando Guallar, Anna Moliner, and Carlos Cuevas.

== Plot ==
Misandric witch-queen Esmeralda manages to escape from the West Indies Fleet and settle in a desert island with her two daughters (princesses Rubí and Salmón) so they can be free from the influence of men, but the island actually happens to be inhabited by a misogynistic logger and his two sons (loggers Verdemar and Azulcielo), so the women cross-dress as men.

== Cast ==
- Emma Suárez as reina Esmeralda
- Gonzalo de Castro as leñador
- Alexandra Jiménez as princesa Rubí
- Fernando Guallar as leñador Verdemar
- Anna Moliner as princesa Salmón
- Carlos Cuevas as leñador Azulcielo

== Production ==
The film is a Spanish-Dominican co-production by Priss&Batty, La Ternura la película AIE, and Bahía Carey with the participation of RTVE and Movistar Plus+. Shooting locations included Las Palmas de Gran Canaria, Madrid and the Cosón Beach near Samaná.

== Release ==
The film received a pre-screening at Cines Kinépolis of Paterna on 25 September 2023. It was also scheduled to screen at the Teatro Victoria Eugenia during a RTVE gala of the 71st San Sebastián International Film Festival on 28 September 2023. Distributed by Universal Pictures International Spain, it was released theatrically in Spain on 29 September 2023.

== Reception ==
Enid Román Almansa of Cinemanía rated the film 4½ out of 5 stars, assessing that the film is as eccentric and crazy as it is fun.

== Accolades ==
Year	Award	Category	Nominee(s)	Result	Ref.
2024	38th Goya Awards	Best Makeup and Hairstyles	Eli Adánez, Juan Begara	Nominated	
2024	32nd Actors and Actresses Union Awards	Best Film Actress in a Secondary Role	Alexandra Jiménez	Nominated	

== See also ==
- List of Spanish films of 2023
