= Passe-passe =

- Theatrical release poster
- Directed by: Tonie Marshall
- Written by: Tonie Marshall
- Produced by: Olivier Bomsel; Tonie Marshall; Alain Peyrollaz; Vitaliy Versace (co-producer)
- Starring: Nathalie Baye; Edouard Baer
- Cinematography: Christophe Offenstein
- Edited by: Jacques Comets
- Production company: Tabo Tabo Films
- Distributed by: Warner Bros. Pictures
- Release date: 16 April 2008
- Running time: 93 minutes
- Country: France
- Language: French
- Budget: $5.6 million
- Box office: $3.6 million

Passe-passe is a 2008 French film directed and written by Tonie Marshall.

== Cast ==
- Nathalie Baye – Irène Montier-Duval
- Edouard Baer – Darry Marzouki
- Guy Marchand – Pierre Delage
- Mélanie Bernier – Sonia Yacovlev
- Joey Starr – Max
- Maurice Bénichou – Serge
- Bulle Ogier – Madeleine
- Sandrine Le Berre – Carine
- Michel Vuillermoz – Sacha Lombard
- Hippolyte Girardot – The man with the white shirt
- Samir Guesmi – The nurse
- Michaël Abiteboul – Redhair
