= Maigret (2022 film) =

2022 film directed by Patrice Leconte

- Theatrical release poster
- Directed by: Patrice Leconte
- Written by: Patrice Leconte; Jérôme Tonnerre
- Based on: Maigret et la jeune morte by Georges Simenon
- Produced by: Philippe Carcassonne; Jean-Louis Livi
- Starring: Gérard Depardieu
- Cinematography: Yves Angelo
- Edited by: Joëlle Hache
- Music by: Bruno Coulais
- Production companies: Ciné@; F comme Film; SND Films; Scope Pictures
- Distributed by: SND
- Release date: 23 February 2022 (France)
- Running time: 89 minutes
- Countries: France; Belgium
- Language: French
- Budget: €6 million: (est. $6.6 million)
- Box office: $5.9 million

Maigret is a 2022 French-Belgian crime drama film directed by Patrice Leconte. It is an adaptation of the novel Maigret et la jeune morte by Georges Simenon, published in 1954 and featuring the police detective Jules Maigret. The novel was previously adapted as a television film in 1973 with Jean Richard in the role of Maigret. The film was first released in France on 23 February 2022.

== Synopsis ==
In the 1950s, the body of young woman is found on Place Vintimille in the 9th arrondissement of Paris. The victim is dressed in an evening gown and possesses no identity documents in her purse. The commissaire Jules Maigret and his men are in charge of the investigation and seek to uncover the young woman's identity. The day before, she rented her dress from a neighbourhood shop.

== Cast ==
- Gérard Depardieu as Jules Maigret
- Jade Labeste as Betty
- Mélanie Bernier as Jeanine Arménieu
- Aurore Clément as M^{me} Clermont-Valois
- Clara Antoons as Louise Louvière
- Pierre Moure as Laurent Clermont-Valois
- Bertrand Poncet as Lapointe
- Élizabeth Bourgine as Irène
- Anne Loiret as M^{me} Maigret
- Hervé Pierre as Doctor Paul
- André Wilms as Kaplan
- Philippe du Janerand as the judge
- Jean-Paul Comart as Albert Janvier
- Pascal Elso as Clermont-Valois's lawyer
- Norbert Ferrer as bar owner
- Moana Ferré as Maggy Rouff salon woman
- John Sehil as cemetery employee

== Production ==
=== Development ===
The project was first announced by director-screenwriter Patrice Leconte in March 2019, under the title Maigret et la jeune morte, an adaptation of the Georges Simenon novel of the same name. In November 2020, Leconte revealed that he wanted to make a film "different from the other" films featuring Simenon's fictional commissaire Jules Maigret. Leconte added, "There has not been a Maigret in theaters since 1958, with Jean Gabin."

In September 2021, a poster revealed the title to be simply Maigret. Patrice Leconte explained, "The film is just called Maigret [...]. As if we were saying here, our own Maigret is just that, it's Depardieu."

A third of the film was shot in the studio. However, Leconte did not want to give the impression of an "old-fashioned" Maigret. On the contrary, Leconte wanted to "absolutely avoid" replicating the Maigret television series starring Bruno Cremer. Leconte explained, "Sometimes external – the pipe, the hat – we wanted an intimate Maigret, driven by complex feelings, a view of the world. So modern."

The film is a Belgian co-production.

=== Casting ===
Gérard Depardieu in 2014

Daniel Auteuil was originally cast in the title role but withdrew. In July 2019, it was announced that Gérard Depardieu would replace Auteuil. This was Depardieu's first collaboration with director Patrice Leconte, after several unrealized projects. In November 2020, Leconte said, "We had already come close, but when things need to get done, they get done. [...] I didn't know it, but Gérard Depardieu adores Simenon, he will be fantastic."

The film features the final performance of actor André Wilms, who died on 9 February 2022, two weeks before the film's release.

=== Filming ===
Principal photography was originally scheduled to begin at the end of 2019. The film was delayed due to the COVID-19 pandemic and the confinements implemented in France. In November 2020, it was announced that filming would begin in February 2021. Filming began on 8 February 2021. Filming took place in the Île-de-France region, lasting until 19 March 2021.

== Reception ==
=== Box office ===
Maigret grossed a worldwide total of $5.9 million, against a production budget of about $6.6 million. For its opening day in France, the film topped the box office among new releases with 57,941 admissions (including 19,800 in preview screenings), from a total of 585 screens. The film ranked ahead of Compagnons (12,475) and Zaï zaï zaï zaï (12,048).

At the end of its first week at the French box office, the film ranked third overall with 260,011 admissions, behind the French comedy Maison de retraite (384,940) and ahead of another French comedy, Super-héros malgré lui (168,679).

For its second week of release, Maigret finished in the French box office chart at fourth place with 129,947 admissions (389,958 cumulative). It was again flanked by Maison de retraite (303,654) and Super-héros malgré lui (102,549). The film would continue to drop in the French chart, ranking in sixth place with 82,613 additional admissions for 472,571 cumulative admissions. The film was preceded by Uncharted (199,757) and followed by Super-héros malgré lui (61,104).

=== Critical response ===
Maigret received an average rating of 3.7 out of 5 stars on the French website AlloCiné, based on 29 reviews. On the review aggregator website Rotten Tomatoes, 91% of 22 critics' reviews are positive, with an average rating of 7.1/10.

In general, critics praised Depardieu's performance in the title role. Adrien Gombeaud of Les Echos wrote, "A sumptuous detective adaptation, Maigret, by the grace of Depardieu, also becomes a great film about the loss of a child." Frédéric Strauss of Télérama wrote, "Massive and replete with earthly power, Gérard Depardieu is also completely open to let us guess the intimate and less familiar side of a commissaire who lives in his thoughts, with those that haunt him. Impressive."

Some critics were less enthusiastic. Didier Péron of Libération wrote, "the director of Les Bronzés enlists Depardieu and, in the mothballs of this over-decorated and accessorized adaptation, neutralizes the residual passion of the freewheeling and totally withdrawn (or drunk...) star." Gaël Golhen of Première wrote, "The intentions are there, interesting, and the approach unquestionable. But we are left with the impression of a breathless attempt that misses the degree of excess and scale necessary to certify it in the ranks of great haunting or theoretical films."

=== Awards and nominations ===
Association	Year	Section	Result	Ref.
Saraqusta Film Festival	2022	Official section (fiction)	Included	
