= Half of Oscar =

- Theatrical release poster
- Spanish: La mitad de Óscar
- Directed by: Manuel Martín Cuenca
- Screenplay by: Alejandro Hernández; Manuel Martín Cuenca
- Produced by: Manuel Martín Cuenca; Camilo Vives; Joan Borrell
- Starring: Verónica Echegui; Rodrigo Sáenz de Heredia; Denis Eyriey; Antonio de la Torre
- Cinematography: Rafael de la Uz
- Edited by: Ángel Hernández Zoido
- Production companies: La Loma Blanca PC; 14 Pies Audiovisual; ICAIC
- Distributed by: Golem Distribución
- Release dates: 14 September 2010 (TIFF); 18 March 2011 (Spain)
- Countries: Spain; Cuba
- Language: Spanish

Half of Oscar (Spanish: La mitad de Óscar) is a 2010 Spanish-Cuban drama film directed by Manuel Martín Cuenca from a screenplay by Martín Cuenca and Alejandro Hernández. It stars Verónica Echegui, Rodrigo Sáenz de Heredia, Denis Eyriey, and Antonio de la Torre.

== Plot ==
The plot explores the theme of incest. Upon the worsening of his grandfather's Alzheimer's disease, sullen security guard Óscar meets at the hospital with lively sister María (accompanied by French boyfriend Jean) whom with he has a fraught relationship.

== Cast ==
- Rodrigo Sáenz de Heredia as Óscar
- Verónica Echegui as María
- Denis Eyriey as Jean
- Antonio de la Torre as taxista

== Production ==
A Spanish-Cuban co-production, the film was produced by La Loma Blanca PC alongside 14 Pies Audiovisual and ICAIC, with the participation of Canal Sur. Shooting in the province of Almería (including locations such Cabo de Gata and El Cañarete) wrapped in March 2010.

== Release ==
The film screened at the 35th Toronto International Film Festival on 14 September 2010. Distributed by Golem Distribución, it was released theatrically in Spain on 18 March 2011.

== Reception ==
Jonathan Holland of Variety assessed that despite being "undeniably accomplished, visually striking and superbly played by Rodrigo Saenz de Heredia as its tightly-wound protag", the film "ultimately plays as too leisurely and detached for all but fest auds".

Mirito Torreiro of Fotogramas rated the film 4 out of 5 stars, praising the "extraordinary mise-en-scène", but negatively assessing the (excessive) "hieratism" displayed by the male protagonist.

Sergio F. Pinilla of Cinemanía rated the film 4 out of 5 stars, considering it to be an example of "intimate, risky and honest cinema", which were it to be authored by Louis Malle, it would be deemed a masterpiece.

== Accolades ==
Year	Award	Category	Nominee(s)	Result	Ref.
2012	21st Actors and Actresses Union Awards	Best New Actor	Rodrigo Sáenz de Heredia	Nominated	

== See also ==
- List of Spanish films of 2011
