= Paula Malia =

Spanish actress

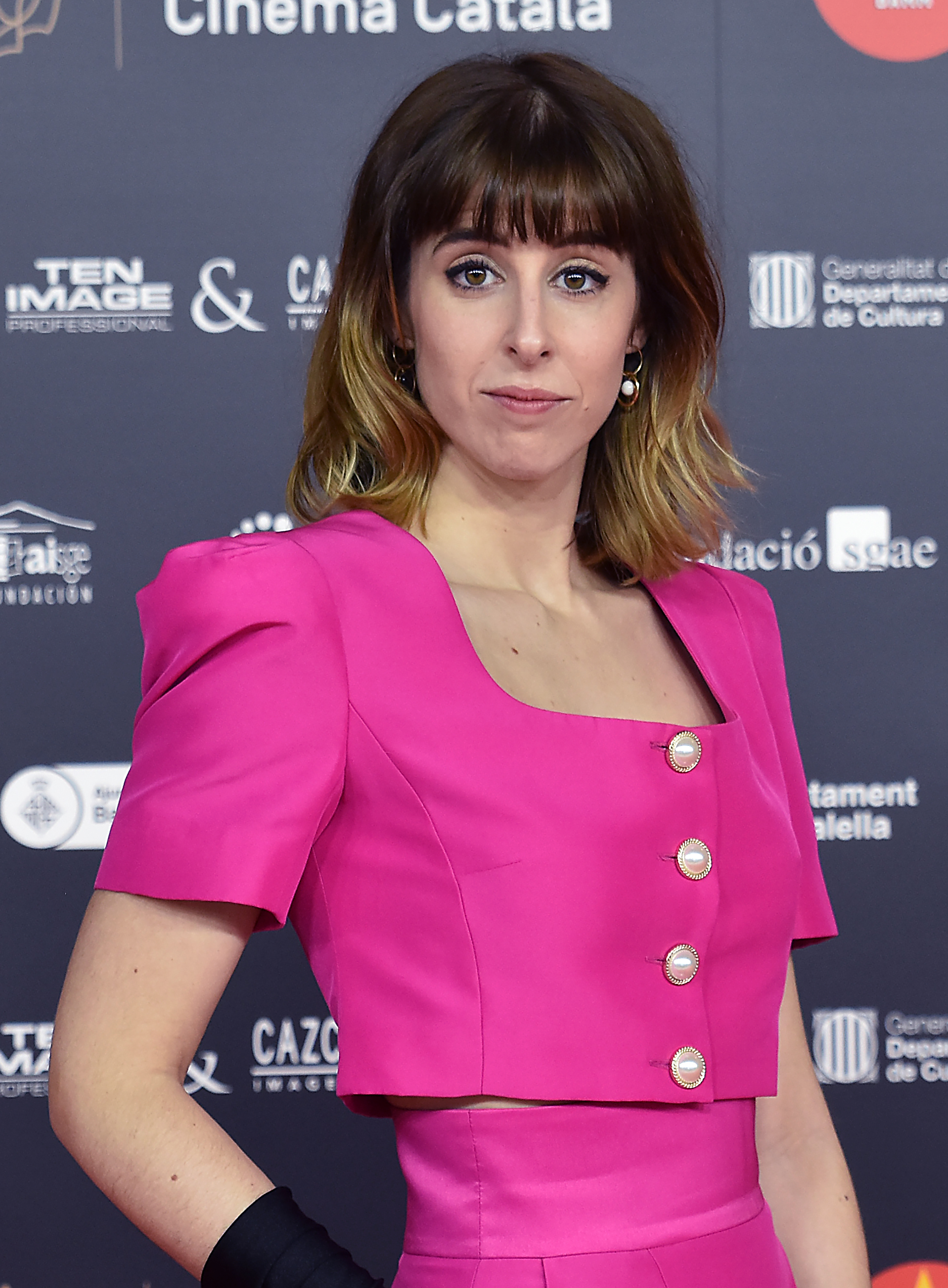
- Paula Malia in XIII Premis Gaudí (2021)
- Born: 26 September 1990 (age 36); Barcelona, Spain
- Occupation: Actress

Paula Malia (born 26 September 1990) is a Spanish actress and singer. She became popular for her role as Carmen in Netflix series Valeria.

== Filmography ==
=== Films ===
- In Family I Trust
- Crazy About Her

=== Television ===
- If I Hadn't Met You
- Valeria
- Love You to Death

== The Mamzelles ==
In 2010 Paula Ribó, together with Paula Malia and Bàrbara Mestanza, founded the music group The Mamzelles. The band released two albums Que se desnude otra (2012) and Totem (2014). In 2012, they created a theatre company, The Mamzelles Teatre.
