= Mine de rien =

- Directed by: Mathias Mlekuz
- Written by: Mathias Mlekuz; Philippe Rebbot; Cécile Telerman
- Produced by: Marc-Etienne Schwartz
- Starring: Arnaud Ducret; Philippe Rebbot; Mélanie Bernier
- Cinematography: Lucas Leconte
- Music by: Matthieu Gonet
- Production companies: M.E.S Productions; Orange Studio
- Distributed by: Orange Studio
- Release dates: 16 January 2020 (Alpe d'Huez International Comedy Film Festival); 26 February 2020 (France)
- Running time: 85 minutes
- Country: France
- Language: French
- Budget: $2.5 million
- Box office: $865.000

Mine de rien is a French comedy film directed by Mathias Mlekuz, released in 2020.

== Plot ==
In a small town in northern France, a long-running mine is closing, leaving dozens of people without jobs. Not giving up, following the relocation of the company that promised to rehire them, the workers hold a sit-in in front of the site. Faced with a dilemma of the town's mayor, who threatens to seize the land, they come up with the idea to transform the old mine into an amusement park.

== Cast ==
- Arnaud Ducret: Arnault
- Philippe Rebbot: Di Lello
- Mélanie Bernier: Stella
- Hélène Vincent: Thérèse, Arnault's Mother
- Rufus: Roger Morels
- Marianne Garcia: Bernadette
- Cyril Aubin: René
- Rebecca Finet: The Mayor
- Mohamed Makhtoumi: Roschdy
- Josef Mlekuz: Kévin
- Philippe Cabrelli: Cédric, Bernadette's Son
- Sophie Bourdon: Isabelle, Arnault's Ex-Wife
- Patrick Rocca: Lucien Borowjack
- Anthony Lequet: Victor
- Yanis Richard: Johan
- Gaëlle Fraysse: Sarah, Di Lello's Wife
- François Godart: Jean-Frédéric
- Tassadit Mandi: Madame Zelmani, Roschdy's Mother
- Fabio Zenoni: Police Officer #1
- Laurent Dauvillée: Police Officer #2

== Inspiration ==
The director claims to have been inspired by the comedies of Yves Robert, Ettore Scola, Peter Cattaneo, and Ernst Lubitsch.

== Filming ==
Filming took place from December to January 2019, primarily in Lens, Loos-en-Gohelle, and Liévin.

== Awards ==
- 2020 L'Alpe d'Huez Film Festival: Audience award

== Box office ==
The film was released on February 26, 2020, in 304 theatres, and sold 14,598 tickets for its first day. The film's weekend opening sold a total of 67,070 tickers. The week following sold a total of 84,133.

The overall consensus was that the film had a weak opening, affected in part by the Coronavirus.

During its first free broadcast on television on the C8 channel, the film garnered a total of 810,000 viewers.

== See also ==
- The Full Monty
