= Love You to Death (Spanish TV series) =

2025 Spanish television series

- Promotional poster
- Spanish: A muerte
- Genre: Romantic comedy
- Created by: Dani de la Orden
- Written by: Oriol Capel; Natalia Durán
- Directed by: Dani de la Orden; Oriol Pérez
- Starring: Verónica Echegui; Joan Amargós; Paula Malia; Cristian Valencia; Claudia Melo; Roger Coma; Joan Solé; Julián Villagrán; David Bagés
- Country of origin: Spain
- Original language: Spanish
- No. of seasons: 1
- No. of episodes: 7

Production
- Executive producers: Montse García; Elena Bort; Ana Eiras
- Producers: Toni Carrizosa; Alberto Aranda; Yolanda del Val; Ignacio Segura
- Cinematography: María Codina
- Production companies: Atresmedia TV; Sábado Películas; DeAPlaneta; Playtime Movies

Original release
- Network: Apple TV+
- Release: 5 February – 12 March 2025

Love You to Death (Spanish: A muerte) is a romantic comedy television series created by Dani de la Orden that began streaming on Apple TV+ on 5 February 2025. It stars Verónica Echegui and Joan Amargós.

== Synopsis ==
The plot follows the relationship of Raúl, a risk-averse young man recently diagnosed with heart cancer and dumped by his girlfriend Georgina for being a pushover, with lively and madcap childhood friend Marta, who has just found out to be pregnant.

== Cast ==
- Verónica Echegui as Marta
- Joan Amargós as Raúl
- Paula Malia as Georgina
- Cristian Valencia as Edu
- Clàudia Melo as Ana
- Roger Coma
- Joan Solé
- Julián Villagrán
- David Bagés
- Berto Romero
- Leticia Dolera
- Emma Vilarasau
- Blanca Apilanez

== Production ==
The project was developed as an Atresplayer original series, produced by Atresmedia TV alongside Sábado Películas, DeAPlaneta, and Playtime Movies. Shooting locations included Barcelona. María Codina handled cinematography. Prior to Atresplayer setting a release date, it was reported that Apple TV+ had acquired the series.

== Episodes ==
No. overall	No. in season	Title	Directed by	Written by	Original release date
1	1	"Eros and the Funeral" (Eros y tanatorio)	Dani de la Orden	Oriol Capel, Natalia Durán	5 February 2025
2	2	"The Date" (La cita)	Dani de la Orden	Oriol Capel, Natalia Durán	5 February 2025
3	3	"The Art of Advertising" (El arte de la publicidad)	Oriol Pérez	Oriol Capel, Natalia Durán	12 February 2025
4	4	"Who Lives There?" (¿Quién vive ahí?)	Dani de la Orden	Oriol Capel, Natalia Durán	19 February 2025
5	5	"Wasteland" (Automoción)	Oriol Pérez	Oriol Capel, Natalia Durán	26 February 2025
6	6	"The Shortest Night of the Year" (La noche más corta del año)	Dani de la Orden	Oriol Capel, Natalia Durán	5 March 2025
7	7	"Until the Countdown Ends" (Hasta que llegó su hora)	Dani de la Orden	Oriol Capel, Natalia Durán	12 March 2025

== Release ==
The first two episodes premiered worldwide on Apple TV+ on 5 February 2025.

== Reception ==
On the review aggregator website Rotten Tomatoes, 100% of five critics' reviews are positive. On Metacritic the film has a weighted average score of 71 out of 100 based on four critics, indicating "generally favorable" reviews.

Cristina Escobar of RogerEbert.com deemed the series to be "a satisfying, if imperfect, watch", praising the execution of the set pieces, while criticizing the pilot episode's overly slow pace.

== See also ==
- 2025 in Spanish television
