= Valeria (2020 TV series) =

Spanish comedy-drama television series (2020–2025)

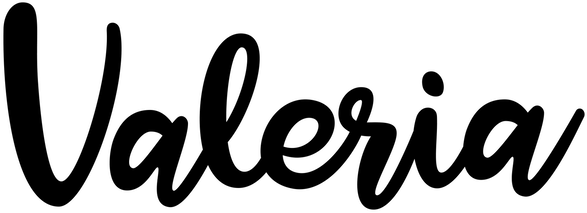
- Genre: Comedy drama; Romantic comedy; Sex comedy
- Based on: En los zapatos de Valeria by Elísabet Benavent
- Developed by: María López Castaño
- Directed by: Inma Torrente; Nely Reguera; Laura M. Campos
- Starring: Diana Gómez; Silma López; Paula Malia; Teresa Riott; Maxi Iglesias; Ibrahim Al Shami; Juanlu González; Federico Aguado
- Composers: Ayelén Martínez de Salazar; Roberto Corralo; Jesus Quijada
- Country of origin: Spain
- Original language: Spanish
- No. of seasons: 4
- No. of episodes: 30

Production
- Executive producers: María López Castaño (season 1); Marina Pérez (seasons 2–4); Elísabet Benavent (seasons 2–4); Ángel Armada (season 4)
- Producer: César Benítez
- Cinematography: Johnny Yebra; Víctor Tejedor Navares
- Editors: Cristina G. Aller; Alicia González Sahagún; Isabel Álverez de Morales; Miguel Doblado; Laurent Berna
- Camera setup: Single-camera
- Running time: 37–46 minutes
- Production company: Plano a Plano

Original release
- Network: Netflix
- Release: 8 May 2020 – 14 February 2025

Valeria is a Spanish comedy-drama television series developed by María López Castaño for Netflix, based on the novel series En los zapatos de Valeria by Elísabet Benavent. It stars Diana Gómez, Silma López, Paula Malia, Teresa Riott, Maxi Iglesias and Ibrahim Al Shami. The first season premiered on 8 May 2020. On 12 June 2020, the series was renewed for a second season. The second season was released on 13 August 2021. In October 2021, Netflix reported that Valeria was renewed for a third season which was released on 2 June 2023. The third season was initially reported to be the last, but in March 2024, the series was renewed for a fourth and final season, which was released on 14 February 2025.

== Premise ==
Set in Madrid, the plot revolves around Valeria, a writer who feels that something is missing in her marriage and writing.

== Cast and characters ==
=== Main ===
- Diana Gómez as Valeria
- Silma López as Lola
- Paula Malia as Carmen
- Teresa Riott as Nerea
- Maxi Iglesias as Víctor
- Ibrahim Al Shami as Adrián (seasons 1–2)
- Juanlu González as Borja (seasons 2–4; recurring season 1)
- Federico Aguado as Bruno Aguilar (seasons 3–4)

=== Recurring ===
- Mero González as Zaida (season 1)
- Júlia Molins as Cris (season 1)
- Aitor Luna as Sergio (seasons 1–2)
- Melissa Fernández as Carmen's co-worker (season 1)
- Esperanza Guardado as Lidia (season 1)
- Raquel Ventosa as Olga (seasons 1–2)
- Cris Iglesias as Gloria (seasons 1–2)
- José Pastor as Rai (seasons 3–4)

=== Guest ===
- Nicolás Coronado as Carlos (season 2)
- Celia Monedero as Valeria Joven (season 3)

== Episodes ==
Series	Episodes	Originally released
1	8	8 May 2020
2	8	13 August 2021
3	8	2 June 2023
4	6	14 February 2025

=== Season 1 (2020) ===
No. overall	No. in season	Title	Directed by	Written by	Original release date
1	1	"The Impostor" (Spanish: "La impostora")	Inma Torrente	María López Castaño	8 May 2020
2	2	"Signs" (Spanish: "Señales")	Inma Torrente	Aurora Gracia Tortosa	8 May 2020
3	3	"Alaska"	Inma Torrente	Almudena Ocaña	8 May 2020
4	4	"The Pond" (Spanish: "La charca")	Nely Reguera	Aurora Gracia Tortosa	8 May 2020
5	5	"Mr Champi"	Nely Reguera	Fernanda Eguiarte	8 May 2020
6	6	"My Garden Is Dry" (Spanish: "La regadera")	Nely Reguera	Almudena Ocaña	8 May 2020
7	7	"The Package" (Spanish: "El paquete")	Inma Torrente	Aurora Gracia Tortosa	8 May 2020
8	8	"Ellipsis" (Spanish: "Puntos suspensivos")	Inma Torrente	Aurora Gracia Tortosa and María López Castaño	8 May 2020

=== Season 2 (2021) ===
No. overall	No. in season	Title	Directed by	Written by	Original release date
9	1	"Stop Running" (Spanish: "Dejar de huir")	Inma Torrente	Marina Pérez & Montaña Marchena	13 August 2021
10	2	"If You Don't Know What to Do, Write" (Spanish: "Si no sabes qué hacer, escribe")	Inma Torrente	Marina Pérez & Montaña Marchena	13 August 2021
11	3	"A Book Isn't Just a Book" (Spanish: "Un libro no es un libro")	Laura Campos	Marina Pérez & Montaña Marchena	13 August 2021
12	4	"Exposed" (Spanish: "Expuesta")	Laura Campos	Marina Pérez & Montaña Marchena	13 August 2021
13	5	"Melt Down" (Spanish: "Fundición")	Inma Torrente	Marina Pérez & Montaña Marchena	13 August 2021
14	6	"Omelet Challenge" (Spanish: "Tortilla challenge")	Laura Campos	Marina Pérez & Montaña Marchena	13 August 2021
15	7	"Flicker" (Spanish: "Titilar")	Inma Torrente	Marina Pérez & Montaña Marchena	13 August 2021
16	8	"Reflection" (Spanish: "Reflejo")	Inma Torrente	Marina Pérez & Montaña Marchena	13 August 2021

=== Season 3 (2023) ===
No. overall	No. in season	Title	Directed by	Written by	Original release date
17	1	"The Bachelorette Party" (Spanish: "La despedida")	Inma Torrente	Marina Pérez & Montaña Marchena	2 June 2023
18	2	"Balance" (Spanish: "Equilibrio")	Inma Torrente	Marina Pérez & Montaña Marchena	2 June 2023
19	3	"The End" (Spanish: "Fin")	Laura M. Campos	Marina Pérez & Montaña Marchena	2 June 2023
20	4	"I Was There" (Spanish: "Yo estaba ahí")	Laura M. Campos	Marina Pérez & Montaña Marchena	2 June 2023
21	5	"Taste You" (Spanish: "Comerte")	Inma Torrente	Marina Pérez & Montaña Marchena	2 June 2023
22	6	"The Word" (Spanish: "Las palabras")	Inma Torrente	Marina Pérez & Montaña Marchena	2 June 2023
23	7	"Getting Old" (Spanish: "Hacerse mayor")	Laura M. Campos	Marina Pérez & Montaña Marchena	2 June 2023
24	8	"The Decision" (Spanish: "La decisión")	Laura M. Campos	Marina Pérez & Montaña Marchena	2 June 2023

=== Season 4 (2025) ===
No. overall	No. in season	Title	Directed by	Written by	Original release date
25	1	"Non-player Character"	Laura M. Campos	Marina Pérez & Montaña Marchena	14 February 2025
26	2	"The Light" (Spanish: "La luz")	Laura M. Campos	Marina Pérez & Montaña Marchena	14 February 2025
27	3	"Emotional Responsibility" (Spanish: "Responsabilidad afectiva")	Marina Pérez	Marina Pérez & Montaña Marchena	14 February 2025
28	4	"Make a Wish" (Spanish: "Pide un deseo")	Marina Pérez	Marina Pérez & Montaña Marchena	14 February 2025
29	5	"Fair" (Spanish: "Feria")	Laura M. Campos	Marina Pérez & Montaña Marchena	14 February 2025
30	6	"Here and Now" (Spanish: "Aquí y ahora")	Laura M. Campos	Marina Pérez & Montaña Marchena	14 February 2025

== Production and release ==
Valeria is an adaptation of the novel series En los zapatos de Valeria, written by Elísabet Benavent from 2013 to 2015. Produced by Plano a Plano, the first season was written by María López Castaño, Aurora Gracià, Almudena Ocaña and Fernanda Eguiarte; whereas Inma Torrente and Nely Reguera were charged with the direction of the episodes. Benjamín Alfonso had been cast for the role of Víctor in pre-production but he was eventually replaced by Maxi Iglesias. Filming took place in 2019 primarily in Madrid. A film set in Fuenlabrada was used for indoor shooting locations, including Valeria's residence. It was released on Netflix on 8 May 2020.

On 12 June 2020, Netflix announced that the series was renewed for a second season, a report that was already leaked weeks before the show's release. Also produced by Plano a Plano, season 2 was written by Marina Pérez and Montaña Marchena and directed by Inma Torrente and Laura M. Campos. Netflix set its release date for 13 August 2021. In October 2021, Netflix reported that Valeria was renewed for a third and final season, that was released on 2 June 2023.
