= Patricia Font =

Spanish film director and screenwriter (born 1978)

- Born: 1978 (age 47–48); Barcelona, Spain
- Education: Cinema and Audiovisual School of Catalonia; Escuela Internacional de Cine y Televisión
- Occupations: Film director; screenwriter

Patricia Font (born 1978) is a Spanish film director and screenwriter. After directing for television, she won the Goya Award for Best Fictional Short Film for Café para llevar (2014) and made her feature film debut with In Family I Trust (2019).

She later directed The Teacher Who Promised the Sea (2023), based on the life of teacher Antoni Benaiges. She then directed the Netflix romantic comedy Love, Divided (2024).

== Early life and training ==
Font was born in Barcelona in 1978, graduated in film directing from the Escola Superior de Cinema i Audiovisuals de Catalunya (ESCAC) in 2002 and later completed her studies at Cuba's Escuela Internacional de Cine y Televisión. By 2016, Font was also teaching at ESCAC.

== Career ==
=== Television and short films ===
Font directed the short film Duna y el ogro and four episodes of the second season of Polseres vermelles before making Café para llevar, her second short film, which starred Alexandra Jiménez and Daniel Grao. Her other television work included directing episodes of Cites, Cites Barcelona and La templanza, and writing for Cites. Font said the success of Café para llevar at festivals helped her move into feature films; she also said she feels more comfortable directing drama than comedy, which she considers more difficult.

=== Feature films ===
Font made her feature directorial debut with Gente que viene y bah (2019), an adaptation of Laura Norton's novel starring Clara Lago, Alexandra Jiménez and Carmen Maura; at producer Francisco Ramos's suggestion, the setting was moved from northern Spain to the Barcelona coast, which Font said helped her give the film the warm, gentle tone she wanted. Filming had begun in Caldes d'Estrac in October 2017, with a technical team drawn from the ESCAC.

Her second feature, El maestro que prometió el mar (2023), was adapted by Albert Val from Francesc Escribano's book about Antoni Benaiges and starred Enric Auquer as Benaiges and Laia Costa as Ariadna, a fictional character Font said connected the historical story with present-day searches for missing relatives. While preparing the film, Font visited Benaiges's former school, met his family and was shown surviving school notebooks and a printing press. Discussing the film at the 2024 London Spanish Film Festival, Font said she had chosen to imply the torture rather than show it in detail.

Font directed the Netflix romantic comedy Pared con pared (2024), a remake of the French film Tras la pared, starring Aitana as a pianist and Fernando Guallar as a game inventor who needs silence to work; although it was released after El maestro que prometió el mar, it had finished filming before the historical drama began production.

Font and Miguel Ibáñez created the HBO Max series Los huérfanos, which she is directing; it follows three siblings abandoned at a railway station and is scheduled for release in 2027.

== Awards ==
Font won the Goya Award for Best Fictional Short Film for Café para llevar at the 2015 Goya Awards. The second season of Cites was nominated for Best Comedy Series at the 2017 Feroz Awards.

El maestro que prometió el mar received five nominations at the 38th Goya Awards: Best Adapted Screenplay, Best Actor, Best Supporting Actress, Best Original Score and Best Costume Design. It won the Audience Award at the 16th Gaudí Awards. It also won Best Spanish Film at the sixth Cine por Mujeres Madrid.
