= The Lesser Evil (2007 film) =

- Theatrical release poster
- Spanish: El menor de los males
- Directed by: Antonio Hernández
- Screenplay by: Antonio Galeano; Antonio Hernández
- Starring: Carmen Maura; Roberto Álvarez; Verónica Echegui; Antonio Durán Morris; César Cambeiro; Xabier Deive; Marta Belenguer; Berta Ojea
- Cinematography: Javier Salmones
- Edited by: Jorge Coira
- Music by: Pablo Martín-Caminero
- Production company: Voz Audiovisual
- Distributed by: Filmax
- Release dates: 11 March 2007 (Málaga); 14 March 2008 (Spain)
- Country: Spain
- Language: Spanish

The Lesser Evil (Spanish: El menor de los males) is a 2007 Spanish black comedy thriller film directed by Antonio Hernández which stars Carmen Maura, Roberto Álvarez, and Verónica Echegui.

== Plot ==
Right-wing politician Eduardo is staying in his sister's mansion in Galicia with personal secretary Ruth and bodyguards. Upon his affair with red-hot Vanesa, Eduardo suspects he is about to become blackmailed by his lover, who claims to be pregnant.

== Cast ==
- Carmen Maura as Julia
- Roberto Álvarez as Eduardo
- Verónica Echegui as Vanesa
- Marta Belenguer as Ruth
- Antonio Durán Morris as Hugo
- Xabier Deive as Rodero
- César Cambeiro
- Berta Ojea

== Production ==
The film is a Voz Audiovisual production. It was fully shot in Pontemaceira, province of A Coruña.

== Release ==
The film premiered at the 10th Málaga Film Festival on 10 March 2007. Distributed by Filmax, it was released theatrically in Spain on 14 March 2008.

== Reception ==
Fernando Méndez-Leite of Fotogramas rated the film 4 out of 5 stars, citing a well-supported Álvarez as the best thing about the film.

Jonathan Holland of Variety deemed the film (and "engaging riff on the ruthlessness of power as embodied in an ambitious politician") to be a decent shot at satire.

== Accolades ==
Year	Award	Category	Nominee(s)	Result	Ref.
2007	10th Málaga Film Festival	Best Screenplay	Antonio Galeano, Antonio Hernández	Won	
2007	10th Málaga Film Festival	Best Supporting Actress	Verónica Echegui	Won	
2007	10th Málaga Film Festival	Best Costume Design	Ruth Díaz	Won	
2009	7th Mestre Mateo Awards	Best Actress	Carmen Maura	Nominated	
2009	7th Mestre Mateo Awards	Best Editing	Jorge Coira	Won	
2009	7th Mestre Mateo Awards	Best Sound	Carlos Mouriño	Nominated	

== See also ==
- List of Spanish films of 2008
