= Teresa Riott =

Spanish actress

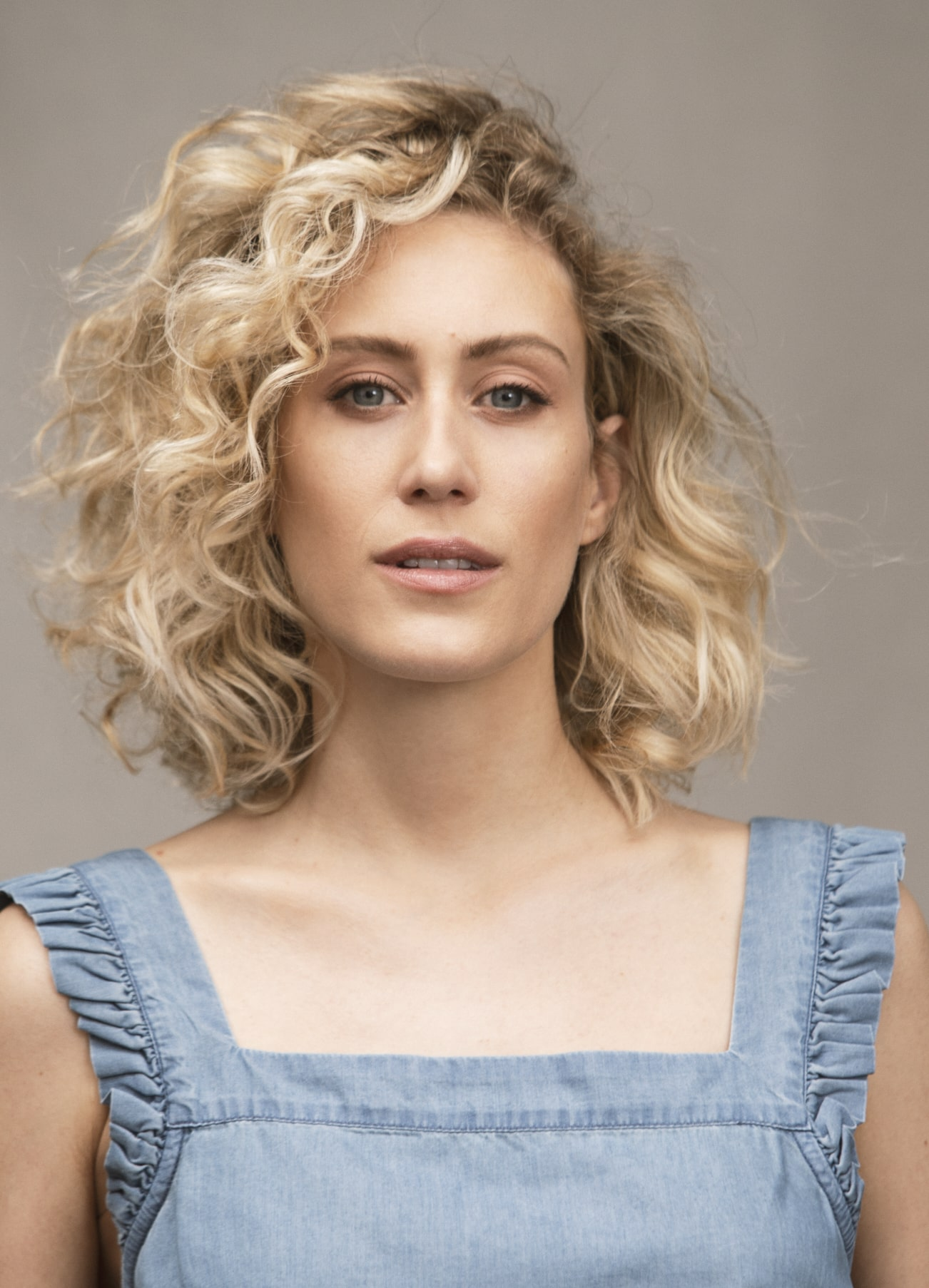
- Born: 13 May 1990; Barcelona, Spain
- Occupation: Actress

Teresa Riott (born 13 May 1990) is a Spanish actress. She became popular for her role as Nerea in Netflix series Valeria.

== Filmography ==
=== Television ===
- Valeria
- El inmortal
