= Silma López =

Spanish actress

- López in 2026
- Born: 3 July 1991 (age 35); Madrid, Spain
- Occupation: Actress
- Years active: 2008–present

Silma López (born 3 July 1991) is a Spanish actress. She is known for her role as Lola in the Netflix series Valeria.

== Filmography ==
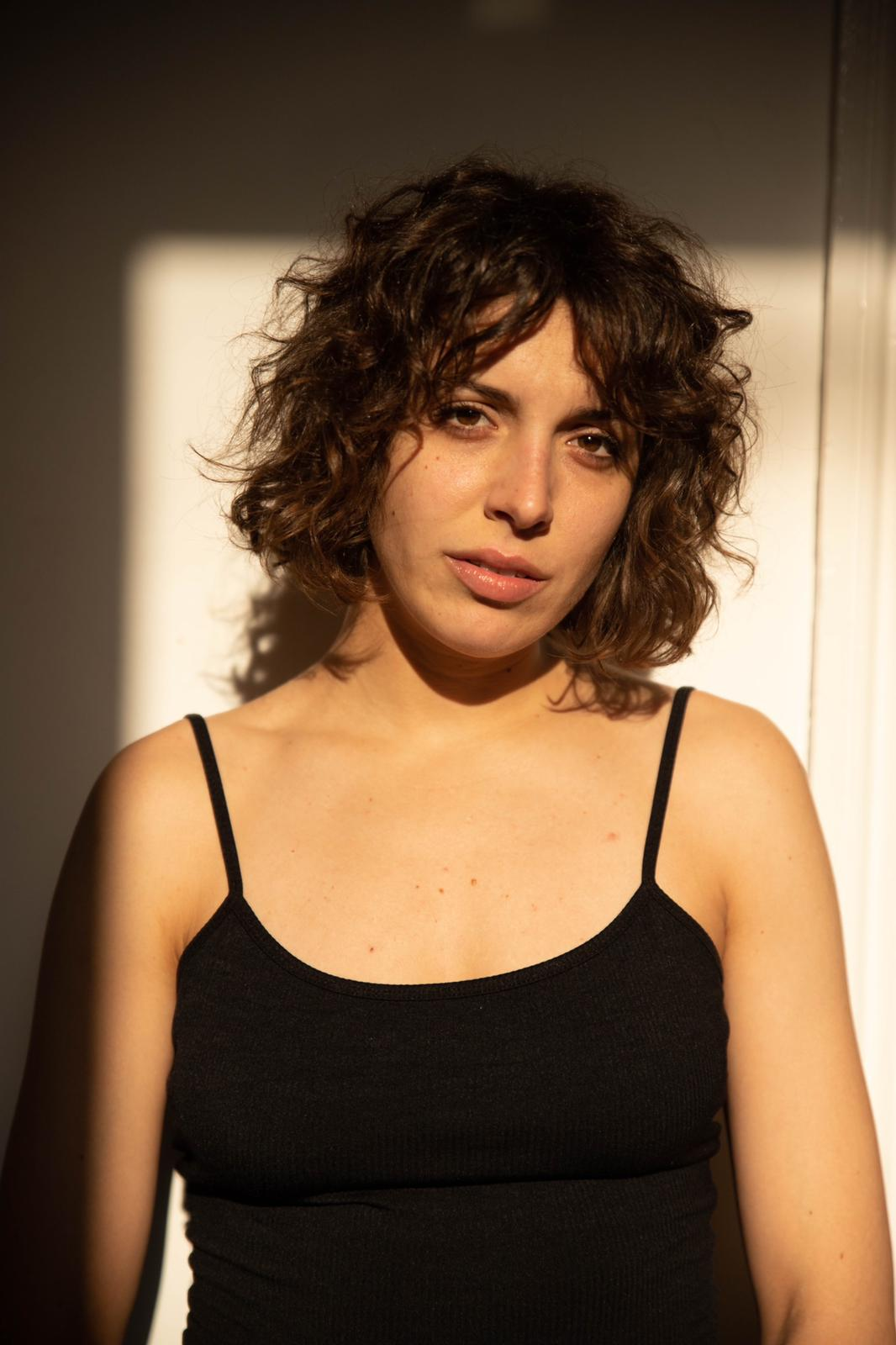
López in 2020

=== Film ===
Year	Title	Role	Ref.
2008	8 Dates	Claudia	
2011	Our Last Weekend	Leo	
2012	Good Night, Said Miss Bird	Waitress	
2013	Crimen con vista al mar	Maite Salgado	
2015	Cuento de verano	Lea	
2019	¿Qué te juegas?	Lieutenant	
2022	13 exorcismos	Lola	
2024	Yo no soy esa	Bárbara	
2026	Casi todo bien (Cool Books)	Carolina	

=== Television ===
Year	Title	Role	Notes	Ref.
2008–2009	Cosas de la vida	Susi	Main role	
2016	Private Sales	Jessie / Michelle	2 episodes	
2016	Centro médico	Patient	Season 4, episode 13	
2020–2025	Valeria	Lola	Main role	
2020	#Luimelia	Carla	Episode: "Kamchatka"	
2024	Beguinas	Juana Aranda		
