= The Poisoner =

2006 TV drama film by Christian Faure

- Written by: Anne Giafferi; Daniel Riche; Olga Vincent
- Directed by: Christian Faure
- Starring: Muriel Robin
- Theme music composer: Charles Court; Carolin Petit
- Country of origin: France; Belgium
- Original language: French

Production
- Producers: Jean-Pierre Alessandri; Olga Vincent; Anne Leduc; Arlette Zylberberg
- Cinematography: Willy Stassen
- Editor: Jean-Daniel Fernandez-Qundez
- Running time: 200 minutes
- Production company: Ramona Productions

Original release
- Network: TF1
- Release: 25 September 2006

The Poisoner or Marie Besnard, l'empoisonneuse is a 2006 French-Belgium drama television film directed by Christian Faure. It stars Muriel Robin as Marie Besnard and it was broadcast on TF1 in 2006.

== Plot ==
In 1947, in Loudun, Mary and Leon Besnard celebrate with their friends, eighteen years of marriage. Marie surprising gestures moved between Leo and her best friend, Louise. Soon after, Leo gets sick and dies. Louise confided to a friend that Leo was convinced he was poisoned by his wife. In Paris, Simone Roulier, a trainee journalist, decides to cover the case.

== Cast ==
- Muriel Robin as Marie Besnard
- Mélanie Bernier as Simone Roulier
- Olivier Saladin as Auguste Leclerc
- Grégory Fitoussi as Monsieur Vidal
- Marie-Hélène Lentini as Madame Rossignol
- Mado Maurin as Madame Davaillaud
- Maurice Antoni as Frédéric Joliot-Curie
- Jean-Yves Chatelais as Léon Besnard
- Annie Grégorio as Louise Pinson
- Marie-France Santon as Madame Trousseau
- Jean-Noël Brouté as Inspector Lavalette
- Cécile Bois as Lawyer Chantal Jacquemin
- Philippe Magnan as Lawyer Gabard
- Philippe du Janerand as President Guirec
- Pierre Laroche as President Boissier
- Jean-Paul Dubois as Doctor Vallois
- Julien Cafaro as Doctor Cellier
- André Penvern as Professor Boiledieu
- René Carton as Professor Griffon
- Max Delor as Professor Kohn-Abres
- Philippe Faure as Professor Peccoux
- Benoît Georges as Professor Ollivier
- Jean-Marc Roulot as Professor Perrot
- Jacques Leplus as Professor Kelling
- Jean-Pierre Alessandri as Monsieur Bonbour
- Maria Ducceschi as Madame Duzac
- Vincent Duviau as Célestin Fichet
- Zazie Delem as Ginette Baujan
- Nicolas Jouhet as René Davaillaud
- Frank Geney as Ady
- Gérard Chaillou as Bodin
- Pascal Reneric as Jacques
- Maëva Pasquali as Marylou
- Anne Girouard as Henriette
- Jean-Paul Bonnaire as Gaston
- François Aramburu as Pixier
- Stéphane Jobert as Garnier
- Anne Loiret as Simone's Mother

== Accolades ==
Award	Category	Recipient	Result
International Emmy Awards	Best Actress	Muriel Robin	Won
