= Mélanie Bernier =

French actress

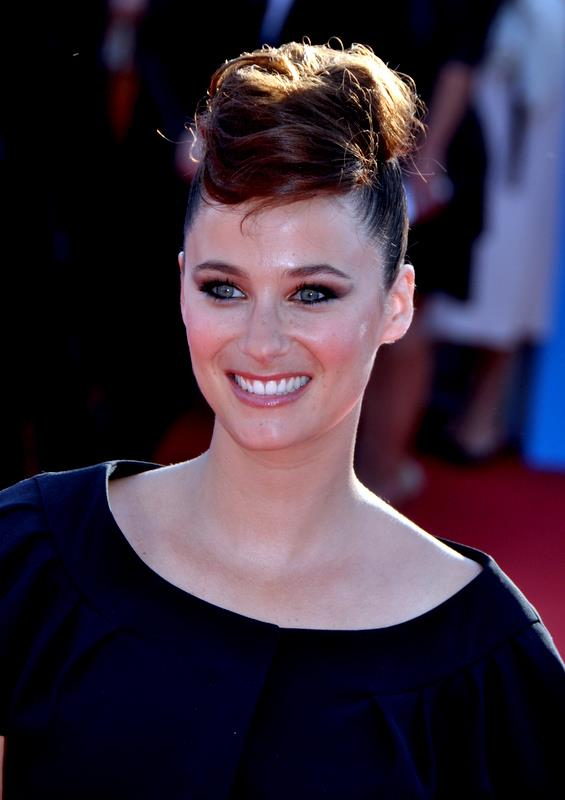
- Bernier at the 2012 Deauville American Film Festival
- Born: 5 January 1985 (age 40); Grasse, France
- Occupation: Actress
- Years active: 2000–present
- Children: 1

Mélanie Bernier (born 5 January 1985) is a French actress. She has appeared in several films such as My Afternoons with Margueritte, The Assault (both 2010), Populaire (2012), Les Gamins, The Informant (both 2013), Blind Date, Our Futures (both 2015), and Maigret (2022).

== Early life ==
Mélanie Bernier was born on 5 January 1985 in Grasse, France, and grew up in Veigné, Indre-et-Loire.

== Personal life ==
From 2013 to 2015, she was in a relationship with actor Jonathan Cohen. In November 2017, she announced that she was pregnant with her first child without revealing the identity of the father. In February 2018, she gave birth to a daughter.

== Selected filmography ==
- The Poisoner (2006)
- Sa majesté Minor (2007)
- Passe-passe (2008)
- My Afternoons with Margueritte (2010)
- The Assault (2010)
- Delicacy (2011)
- Populaire (2012)
- The Informant (2013)
- Les gamins (2013)
- Blind Date (2015)
- Our Futures (2015)
- La prunelle de mes yeux(2016)
- Simon et Théodore (2017)
- Love Addict (2018)
- Mystère à la Sorbonne (2018)
- Mine de rien (2020)
- Maigret (2022 film) (2022)
