= Yo no soy esa =

- Theatrical release poster
- Directed by: Maria Ripoll
- Screenplay by: Olga Iglesias; Maria Ripoll
- Produced by: Enrique López Lavigne; Diego Suárez Chialvo; Pablo Ortiz
- Starring: Verónica Echegui; Silma López; Adam Jeziersky; Olivia Molina; Daniel Grao; Ángela Molina
- Cinematography: Joan Bordera
- Edited by: Juliana Montañés
- Music by: Simon Smith
- Production companies: El Estudio; Cahuenga Filmmakers
- Distributed by: Sony Pictures España
- Release dates: 7 March 2024 (Málaga); 31 October 2024 (Spain)
- Country: Spain
- Language: Spanish
- Box office: $145,990

Yo no soy esa is a 2024 Spanish romantic comedy film directed by Maria Ripoll from a screenplay by Olga Iglesias starring Verónica Echegui and Silma López.

== Plot ==
After entering a coma in the 1990s when she was 17 years old and waking up in 2024, Susana is forced to grow up at a fast pace while navigating societal changes.

== Cast ==
- Verónica Echegui as Susana
- Silma López as Bárbara
- Adam Jezierski
- Daniel Grao as Pepo
- Olivia Molina as Susana's mother
- Ángela Molina as Susana's mother
- Anna Alarcón as doctor
- Mara Reina as Susana (teenage)
- Alba Ribó as Bárbara (teenage)

== Production ==
The film was produced by Cahuenga Filmmakers and El Estudio, with the association of Sony Pictures International Productions and the participation of RTVE.

== Release ==
The film world premiered at the 27th Málaga Film Festival on 7 March 2024. Originally scheduled to be released theatrically on 25 October 2024, the release date was later set for 31 October 2024.

== See also ==
- List of Spanish films of 2024
