= Les Baladins en Agenais =

French theatre company

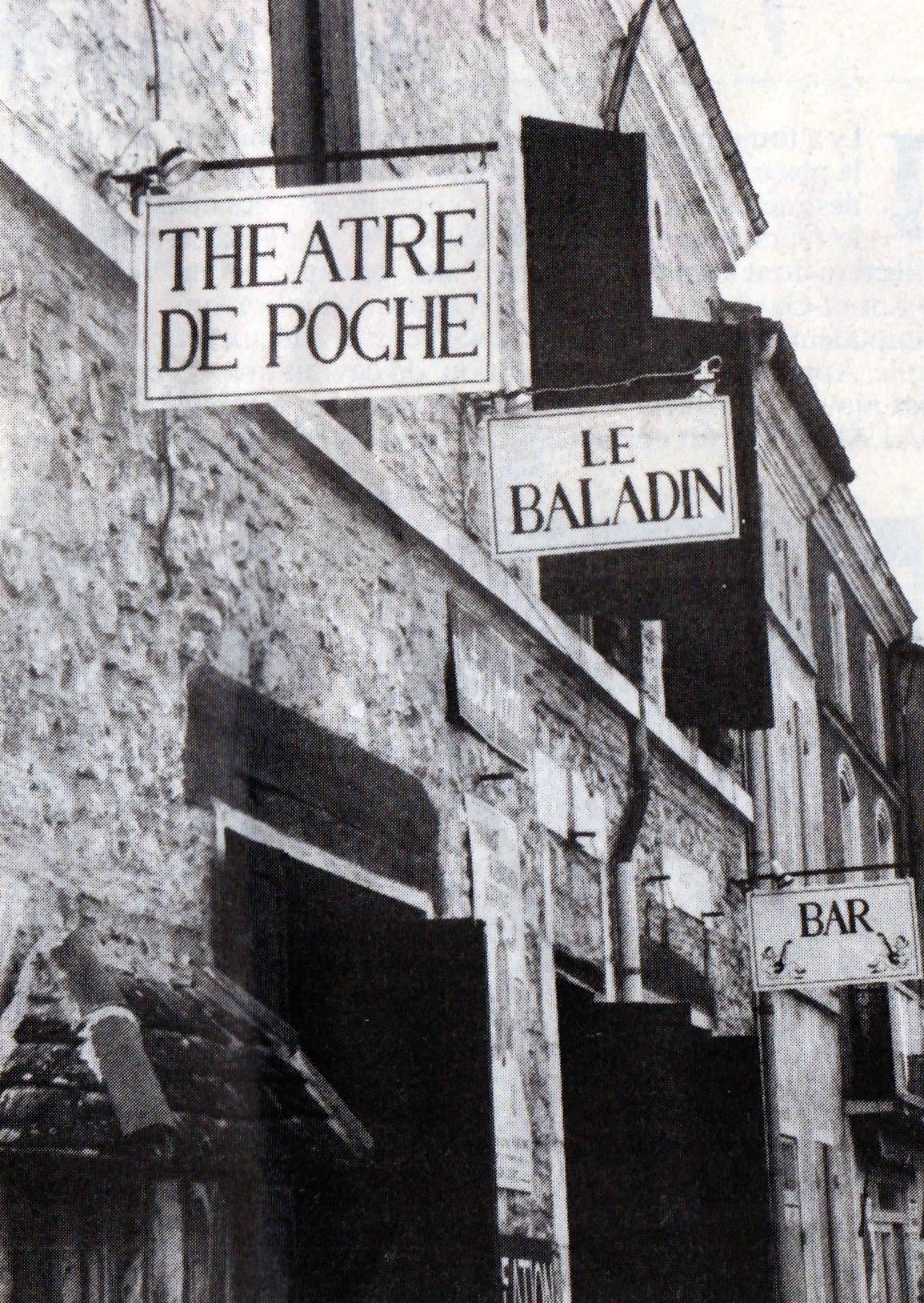
Théâtre de Poche, Monclar. Home to Les Baladins en Agenais.

Les Baladins en Agenais is a theatre troupe from the village of Monclar d'Agenais, Lot-et-Garonne, France. It closed in 2015 after forty years.

In 1973, Roger Louret returned from Paris with other actors trained by Raymond Girard at Conservatoire National Supérieur d'Art Dramatique and organised the first annual Festival en Agenais. By the time of the fourth festival, some of the actors had settled in Monclar and Louret decided to found a theatre company, so with Nicolas Marié and Marianne Valéry they formed Les Baladins en Agenais.

The company continued to hold festivals and events throughout the 1970s and 80s and in the 90s became nationally known due to their television appearances on Les Années Tubes on TF1.

After losing their headquarters, the company disbanded on 9 October 2015.

In 2023, a photography exhibition was held in Agen paying homage to Les Baladins en Agenais and Roger Louret, featuring previously unpublished photographs by Annie Presani.
