= My Heart Goes Boom! =

2020 Spanish comedy film

- Film poster
- Spanish: Explota, explota
- Directed by: Nacho Álvarez
- Written by: Eduardo Navarro; David Esteban Cubero; Nacho Álvarez
- Produced by: Mariela Besuievsky; Gerardo Herrero
- Starring: Ingrid García-Jonsson; Verónica Echegui
- Cinematography: Juan Carlos Gómez
- Edited by: Irene Blecua
- Music by: Roque Baños
- Distributed by: Universal Pictures International
- Release dates: 10 September 2020 (TIFF); 2 October 2020 (Spain)
- Running time: 116 minutes
- Country: Spain
- Language: Spanish

My Heart Goes Boom! (Spanish: Explota, explota) is a 2020 Spanish jukebox musical comedy film directed by Nacho Álvarez, starring Ingrid García-Jonsson and Verónica Echegui. The film is based on songs by Italian artist Raffaella Carrà, with the original title being taken from the Spanish-language lyrics of her hit "A far l'amore comincia tu".

The film was nominated for three Goya Awards and three Feroz Awards.

== Cast ==
- Ingrid García-Jonsson as María
- Verónica Echegui as Amparo
- Fernando Guallar as Pablo
- Giuseppe Maggio as Massimiliano
- Fran Morcillo as Lucas
- Fernando Tejero as Chimo
- Pedro Casablanc as Celedonio
- Carlos Hipólito as Ismael
- Natalia Millán as Rosa

== Awards ==
| Awards | Category | Nominated | Result |
|---|---|---|---|
| Goya Awards | Best Supporting Actress | Verónica Echegui | Nominated |
| Goya Awards | Best Costume Design | Cristina Rodríguez | Nominated |
| Goya Awards | Best Makeup and Hairstyles | Milu Cabrer and Benjamín Pérez | Nominated |
| Premios Feroz | Best Trailer | | Nominated |
| Premios Feroz | Best Supporting Actress | Verónica Echegui | Won |
| Premios Feroz | Best Original Soundtrack | Roque Baños | Nominated |
