= Coulx =

- Commune
- Location of Coulx
- Location within France Location within Nouvelle-Aquitaine
- Coordinates: 44°28′06″N 0°28′21″E
- Country: France
- Region: Nouvelle-Aquitaine
- Department: Lot-et-Garonne
- Arrondissement: Marmande
- Canton: Tonneins
- Intercommunality: CC Lot et Tolzac

Government
  - Mayor (2020–2026): Daniel Furlan
- Area^{1}: 16.32 km^{2} (6.30 sq mi)
- Elevation: 175 m (574 ft)
- Highest elevation: 182 m (597 ft)
- Lowest elevation: 50 m (160 ft)
- Population (2023): 256
  - Density: 15.7/km^{2} (40.6/sq mi)
- Time zone: UTC+01:00 (CET)
  - Summer (DST): UTC+02:00 (CEST)
- INSEE/Postal code: 47071 /47260
- ^{1} French Land Register data, which excludes lakes, ponds, glaciers > 1 km^{2} (0.386 sq mi or 247 acres) and river estuaries.

Coulx (Occitan: Color) is a commune in the Lot-et-Garonne department in south-western France.

== See also ==
- Communes of the Lot-et-Garonne department
