= Álex García (actor) =

Spanish actor

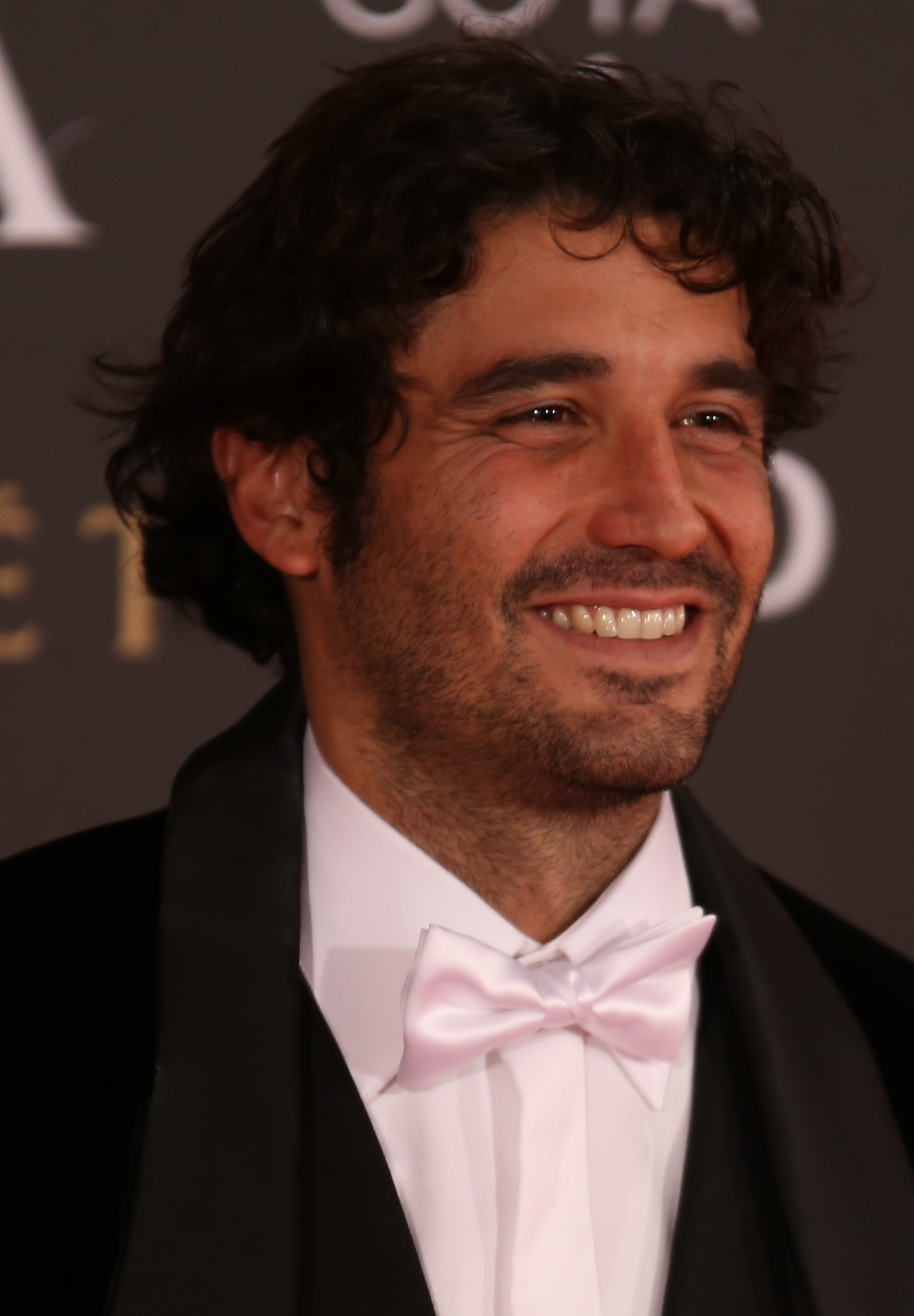
- García in 2017
- Born: Alejandro Juan García Fernández; 14 November 1981 (age 44); San Cristóbal de la Laguna, Spain
- Occupation: Actor
- Partner: Verónica Echegui (2010–2023)

Alejandro Juan García Fernández (born 14 November 1981), better known as Álex García, is a Spanish actor. He rose to prominence for his performances in television series Amar en tiempos revueltos and Tierra de lobos.

== Biography ==
Álex García was born on 14 November 1981 in San Cristóbal de la Laguna, in the island of Tenerife. He worked as a local reporter in the Canary Islands. He moved from the Canary Islands to Madrid to train his acting chops at Cristina Rota's atelier. He appeared in serial drama Compañeros playing Serpa. He featured in minor roles in series such as Hospital Central and Génesis, en la mente del asesino, rising to prominence for his television performances as Alfonso García in Amar en tiempos revueltos and César Bravo in Tierra de lobos. He also earned early public recognition for his role in drama series Sin tetas no hay paraíso.

He landed his first major film role in Six Points About Emma (2011), starring alongside Verónica Echegui. (Note: He met Echegui (his longtime partner) in 2010 during the shooting of the film.) His performances in Entre esquelas (2012) and The Bride (2015) earned him, respectively, an Actors and Actresses Union Award for Best New Actor and a nomination to the Goya Award for Best New Actor.

== Personal life ==
After meeting in the Canary Islands during the filming of Six Points About Emma in 2010 and up until 2023, he was in a relationship with actress Verónica Echegui.

== Awards ==
- Goya award for Best New Actor (2016) [Nominated]
