= 10th Gaudí Awards =

- Date: 28 January 2018
- Site: Forum Auditorium, Barcelona, Catalonia, Spain
- Hosted by: David Verdaguer
- Organized by: Catalan Film Academy

Highlights
- Best Picture: Summer 1993

The 10th Gaudí Awards, organised by the Catalan Film Academy, were presented at the Forum Auditorium in Barcelona on 28 January 2018. The gala was hosted by David Verdaguer.

== Winners and nominees ==
The nominations were read by Alex Brendemühl and Nora Navas at the Old Damm Factory in Barcelona on 28 December 2017. The winners and nominees are listed as follows:

| Best Film: Summer 1993; Brava; Uncertain Glory; La película de nuestra vida | Best Non-Catalan Language Film: Anchor and Hope; Júlia Ist; Holy Camp!; The Bookshop |
| Best Director: Carla Simón — Summer 1993; Agustí Villaronga — Uncertain Glory; Carlos Marques-Marcet — Anchor and Hope; Isabel Coixet — The Bookshop | Best Screenplay: Carla Simón — Summer 1993; Carlos Marques-Marcet, Jules Nurrish — Anchor and Hope; Coral Cruz, Agustí Villaronga — Uncertain Glory; Isabel Coixet — The Bookshop |
| Best Actress: Núria Prims — Uncertain Glory; Laia Artigas — Summer 1993; Laia Marull — Brava; Oona Chaplin — Anchor and Hope | Best Actor: David Verdaguer — Anchor and Hope; Antonio de la Torre — Abracadabra; Marcel Borràs — Uncertain Glory; Ricardo Darín — Black Snow |
| Best Supporting Actress: Bruna Cusí — Summer 1993; Anna Castillo — Holy Camp!; Bruna Cusí — Uncertain Glory; Natalia Tena — Anchor and Hope | Best Supporting Actor: Oriol Pla — Uncertain Glory; Bill Nighy — The Bookshop; David Verdaguer — Summer 1993; Emilio Gutiérrez Caba — Brava |
| Best Production Supervision: Aleix Castellón — Uncertain Glory; Jordi Berenguer, Alex Boyd — The Bookshop; Mireia Graell — Summer 1993; Sergi Moreno, Sophie Venner — Anchor and Hope | Best Documentary Film: La Chana; Classe valenta; Lesa humanitat; Sasha |
| Best European Film: Dunkirk; The Red Turtle; Lady Macbeth; Toni Erdmann | Best Short Film: Los desheredados; Cunetas; La inútil; Les bones nenes |
| Best Television Film: La llum d'Elna; Amics per sempre; Pau, la força d'un silenci; Res no tornarà a ser com abans | Best Art Direction: Llorenç Miquel — The Bookshop; Ana Alvargonzález — Uncertain Glory; Monica Bernuy — Summer 1993; Tim Dickel— Anchor and Hope |
| Best Editing: Ana Pfaff, Didac Palou — Summer 1993; Ariadna Ribas, Diana Toucedo — Júlia Ist; Bernat Aragonés — The Bookshop; Raúl Román — Uncertain Glory | Best Cinematography: Josep M. Civit — Uncertain Glory; Dagmar Weaver-Madsen — Anchor and Hope; Jean-Claude Larrieu — The Bookshop; Santiago Racaj — Summer 1993 |
| Best Original Music: Alfonso Vilallonga — The Bookshop; Ernest Pipó, Pau Boïgues — Summer 1993; José González Riera (Marcus JGR) — Uncertain Glory; Leiva — Holy Camp! | Best Costume Design: Mercè Paloma — Uncertain Glory; Anna Aguilà — Summer 1993; Mercè Paloma — The Bookshop; Vinyet Escobar — Anchor and Hope |
| Best Sound: Xavier Mas, Fernando Novillo, Ricard Galceran — Uncertain Glory; Albert Gay, Enrique G. Bermejo, Carlos Jiménez — The Bookshop; Diego Casares, Jonathan Darch, Dani Zacharias — Anchor and Hope; Eva Valiño, Roger Blasco, Carlos Jiménez — Summer 1993 | Best Makeup and Hairstyles: Alma Casal — Uncertain Glory; Montse Sanfeliu, Laura Vacas — The Bookshop; Pilar Guillem, Marta Arce — Summer 1993; Sylvie Imbert, Paco Rodríguez Frías — Abracadabra |
Best Animated Film: Tad the Lost Explorer and the Secret of King Midas; Deep

=== Honorary Award ===
Actress Mercedes Sampietro was the recipient of the Gaudí honorary award.

=== Audience Award ===
- Holy Camp!
