= 7th Gaudí Awards =

Film awards ceremony organised by the Catalan Film Academy

- Date: 1 February 2015
- Site: Sant Jordi Club, Barcelona, Catalonia, Spain
- Hosted by: Àngel Llàcer
- Organized by: Catalan Film Academy

Highlights
- Best Picture: Traces of Sandalwood

The 7th Gaudí Awards, organised by the Catalan Film Academy, were presented at the Sant Jordi Club in Barcelona on 1 February 2015. The gala was hosted by Àngel Llàcer.

== Winners and nominees ==
The winners and nominees are listed as follows:

| Best Film: Traces of Sandalwood; Falling Star; L'altra frontera; Born | Bet Non-Catalan Language Film: 10,000 km; El Niño; Beautiful Youth; Rec 4: Apocalypse |
| Best Director: Carlos Marques-Marcet — 10,000 km; Daniel Monzón — El Niño; Jaime Rosales — Beautiful Youth; Lluís Miñarro — Falling Star | Best Screenplay: Carlos Marques-Marcet, Clara Roquet — 10,000 km; Daniel Monzón, Jorge Guerricaechevarría — El Niño; Jaime Rosales, Enric Rufas — Beautiful Youth; Lluís Miñarro, Sergi Belbel — Falling Star |
| Best Actress: Natalia Tena — 10,000 km; Aina Clotet — Traces of Sandalwood; Bárbara Lennie — Falling Star; Ingrid García-Jonsson — Beautiful Youth | Best Actor: David Verdaguer — 10,000 km; Àlex Brendemühl — Falling Star; Jesús Castro — El Niño; Luis Tosar — El Niño |
| Best Supporting Actress: Bárbara Lennie — El Niño; Mercè Arànega — Born; Rosa Novell — Traces of Sandalwood; Vicky Peña — Los tontos y los estúpidos | Best Supporting Actor: Eduard Fernández — El Niño; Àlex Batllori — Falling Star; Francesc Garrido — Falling Star; Sergi López — El Niño |
| Best Production Supervision: Edmon Roch, Toni Novella — El Niño; Josep Amorós — Traces of Sandalwood; Mayca Sanz — 10,000 km; Oriol Maymó, Teresa Gefaell — Rec 4: Apocalypse | Best Documentary Film: Gabor; Bugarach; Els anys salvatges; I Will Be Murdered |
| Best European Film: The Great Beauty; Ida; Marshland; Magical Girl | Best Short Film: El corredor; Alex; Café para llevar; Line-up |
| Best Television Film: Descalç sobre la terra vermella; L'últim ball de Carmen Amaya; Prim, el asesinato de la calle del Turco; Vicenç Ferrer | Best Art Direction: Sebastián Vogler — Falling Star; Anna Pujol Tauler — Traces of Sandalwood; Antón Laguna — El Niño; Javier Alvariño — Rec 4: Apocalypse |
| Best Editing: Mapa Pastor — El Niño; Guillermo de la Cal — Rec 4: Apocalypse; Juliana Montañés, Carlos Marques-Marcet — 10,000 km; Núria Esquerra — Falling Star | Best Cinematography: Carles Gusi — El Niño; Jimmy Gimferrer — Falling Star; Pablo Rosso — Rec 4: Apocalypse; Pau Esteve Birba — Beautiful Youth |
| Best Original Music: Roque Baños — El Niño; Arnau Bataller — Rec 4: Apocalypse; Diego Pedragosa, Sergi Cameron — Els anys salvatges; Zeltia Montes, Simon Smith — Traces of Sandalwood | Best Costume Design: Mercè Paloma — Falling Star; Anna Güell — Traces of Sandalwood; Elena Ballester — Born; Vinyet Escobar— 10,000 km |
| Best Sound: Sergio Bürmann, Oriol Tarragó, Marc Orts — El Niño; Dani Fontrodona, Alejandro Castillo, Ricard Casals — Falling Star; Dani Fontrodona, Jordi Monrós, Marc Orts — L'altra frontera; Xavi Mas, Oriol Tarragó, Marc Orts — Rec 4: Apocalypse | Best Special/Digital Effects: Àlex Villagrasa, David Ambit, Lucía Salanueva, Lluís Rivera, Josep Claret — Rec 4: Apocalypse; Bernat Aragonés, Eric Venti, Jose Bahamonde, Arturo Baston — L'altra frontera; Guillermo Orbe, David Martí, Montse Ribé, Raúl Romanillos — El Niño; Javier Romero — Mortadelo and Filemon: Mission Implausible |
Best Makeup and Hairstyles: Alma Casal, Elena Pérez — Rec 4: Apocalypse; Ignasi Ruiz — Falling Star; Concha Rodríguez, Jesús Martos — Traces of Sandalwood; Alicia Rodríguez, Sergio Esche — Born

=== Honorary Award ===
Director Ventura Pons was the recipient of the Gaudí honorary award.
