= David Verdaguer =

Spanish actor and comedian

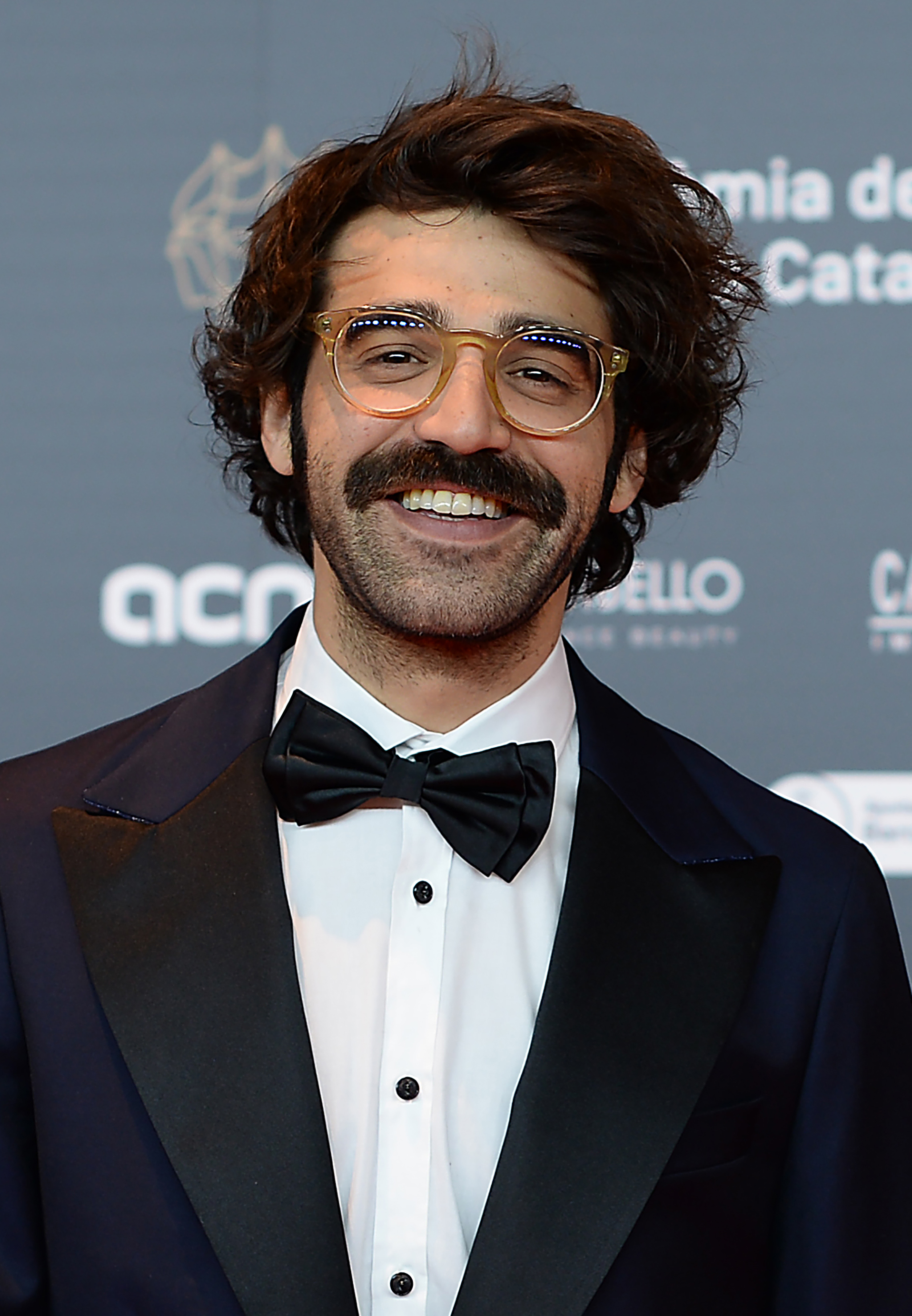
- Verdaguer at the 2020 Gaudí Awards
- Born: David Verdaguer Ruiz; 28 September 1983 (age 43); Malgrat de Mar, Catalonia, Spain
- Occupations: Actor and comedian
- Years active: 2001–present

David Verdaguer Ruiz (born 28 September 1983) is a Spanish actor and comedian. His career include works both in Spanish and Catalan such as 10,000 km (2014), Summer 1993 (2017), for which he received the Goya Award for Best Supporting Actor and One for All (2020). He won the Goya Award for Best Leading Actor for his portrayal of comedian Eugenio in Jokes & Cigarettes (2023).

== Career ==
He began his career in minor roles in different programs from the Catalan public television channel TV3 such as Plats Bruts (2001), El Cor de la Ciutat (2002–2003) and Ventdelplà (2005). In 2006, he became a part of the comedy show Alguna Pregunta Més? as a reporter. In 2008, he got his first main role as Santi in the television series Zoo, about the lives of the workers at the Barcelona Zoo.

He made his acting debut in a feature film in Mar Coll's Three Days With the Family (2009).

Between 2013 and 2014, he participated in the comedy programmes Polònia and Crackòvia doing impressions of several political and sports celebrities and figures. In 2014, he starred in the romantic drama film 10,000 km alongside Natalia Tena, directed by Carlos Marqués-Marcet, his performance in the film was praised by critics and led to his first Goya Award nomination, for Best New Actor, he also won the Gaudí Award for Best Actor in a Leading Role and was nominated for the Feroz Award for Best Main Actor in a Film.

In 2017, he stars in the film Summer 1993 alongside Bruna Cusí and Laia Artigas, directed by Carla Simón, the film received critical acclaim and was selected at the Spanish entry for Best Foreign Language Film at the 90th Academy Awards, though it was not nominated. At the 32nd Goya Awards, the film won three awards out of eight nominations and Verdaguer won Best Supporting Actor. He has collaborated with Carlos Marqués-Marcet two more times, in the films Anchor and Hope (2017) and The Days to Come (2019). In 2020, he starred in Uno para todos, receiving his third Goya nomination.

== Filmography ==
Key
†	Denotes films that have not yet been released

=== Film ===
Year	Title	Role	Notes	Ref.
2009	Tres dies amb la família (Three Days With the Family)	Jordi	Feature film debut	
2014	10.000 km (10,000 km)	Sergi		
2015	Requisitos para ser una persona normal (Requirements to Be a Normal Person)	Juan		
2016	100 metros (100 Meters)	Mario		
2016	No culpes al karma de lo que te pasa por gilipollas (Don't Blame the Karma for Being an Idiot)	Roberto		
2017	Estiu 1993 (Summer 1993)	Esteve		
2017	Anchor and Hope	Roger		
2019	Lo dejo cuando quiera (I Can Quit Whenever I Want)	Pedro		
2019	Els dies que vindran (The Days to Come)	Lluís		
2020	Uno para todos (One for All)	Aleix		
2020	Hogar (The Occupant)	Raúl		
2022	Reyes contra Santa (The Three Wise Kings vs Santa)	Gaspar		
2023	Saben aquell (Jokes & Cigarettes)	Eugenio		
2024	La casa	José		
2024	El 47 (The 47)	Serra		
2025	Molt lluny (Away)	Manel		
2025	Siempre es invierno (Always Winter)	Miguel		
2026	El director † (The Editor)	David Jiménez		
2027	Toda la suerte del mundo †			

=== Television ===
Year	Title	Character	Channel	Notes
2001	Plats bruts		TV3	1 episode
2002–2003	El Cor de la Ciutat		TV3	2 episodes
2005	Ventdelplà		TV3	3 episodes
2008	Zoo	Santi Feliu	TV3	23 episodes
2009	Prepara't per a la TDT		TV3	15 episodes
2011	Barcelona, ciutat neutral	Oliver	TV3	1 episode
2011	La sagrada família	Jofre	TV3	13 episodes
2011–2013	Pop ràpid	Enric	TV3	25 episodes
2012–2014	Crackòvia	Various characters	TV3	44 episodes
2013–2014	Polònia	Various characters	TV3	19 episodes
2013–2016	Les coses grans	Ferrer	TV3	23 episodes
2016	La embajada	Romero	Antena 3	11 episodes
2016–2017	Nit i dia	Pol Ambrós	TV3	26 episodes
2019	Perfect Life	Gustavo	#0	5 episodes

== Awards and nominations ==
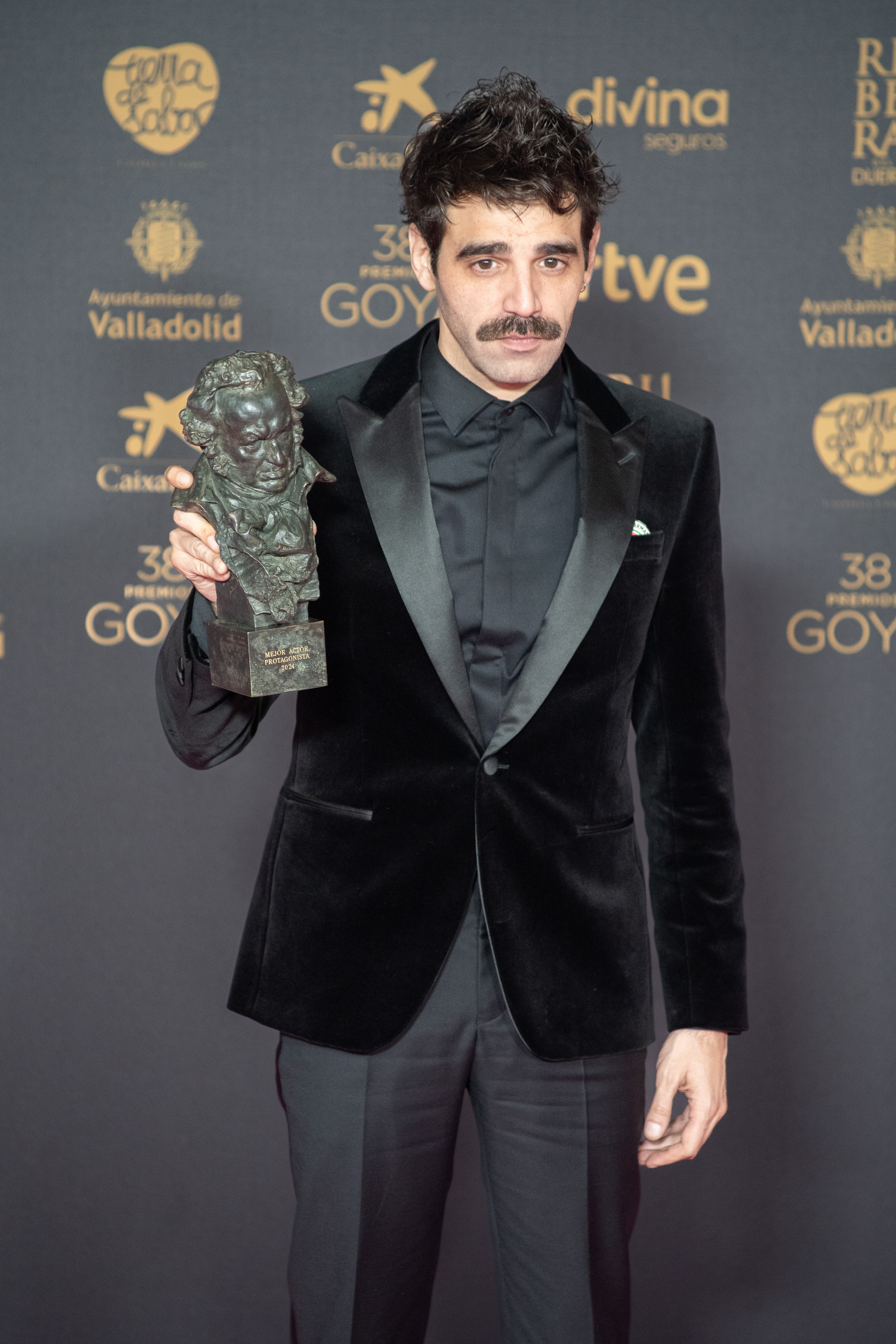
Verdaguer holding his Goya Award for Best Actor for Jokes & Cigarettes.

Year	Award	Category	Work	Result	Ref.
2015	2nd Feroz Awards	Best Main Actor in a Film	10,000 km	Nominated	
2015	7th Gaudí Awards	Best Actor	10,000 km	Won	
2015	70th CEC Medals	Best New Actor	10,000 km	Nominated	
2015	29th Goya Awards	Best New Actor	10,000 km	Nominated	
2017	9th Gaudí Awards	Best Supporting Actor	100 Meters	Nominated	
2018	5th Feroz Awards	Best Supporting Actor in a Film	Summer 1993	Won	
2018	10th Gaudí Awards	Best Supporting Actor	Summer 1993	Nominated	
2018	10th Gaudí Awards	Best Actor	Anchor and Hope	Won	
2018	73rd CEC Awards	Best Supporting Actor	Summer 1993	Nominated	
2018	32nd Goya Awards	Best Supporting Actor	Summer 1993	Won	
2020	7th Feroz Awards	Best Main Actor in a Film	The Days to Come	Nominated	
2020	12th Gaudí Awards	Best Actor	The Days to Come	Nominated	
2021	8th Feroz Awards	Best Main Actor in a Film	One for All	Nominated	
2021	76th CEC Medals	Best Actor	One for All	Won	
2021	35th Goya Awards	Best Actor	One for All	Nominated	
2021	13th Gaudí Awards	Best Actor	One for All	Nominated	
2023	29th Forqué Awards	Best Actor in a Film	Jokes & Cigarettes	Won	
2024	11th Feroz Awards	Best Main Actor in a Film	Jokes & Cigarettes	Won	
2024	16th Gaudí Awards	Best Actor	Jokes & Cigarettes	Won	
2024	80th CEC Medals	Best Actor	Jokes & Cigarettes	Won	
2024	38th Goya Awards	Best Actor	Jokes & Cigarettes	Won	
2024	32nd Actors and Actresses Union Awards	Best Film Actor in a Leading Role	Jokes & Cigarettes	Won	
2024	11th Platino Awards	Best Actor	Jokes & Cigarettes	Nominated	
2025	17th Gaudí Awards	Best Supporting Actor	The 47	Nominated	
2025	12th Feroz Awards	Best Main Actor in a Film	La casa	Nominated	
2025	7th Lola Gaos Awards	Best Actor	La casa	Won	
2026	27th Iris Awards	Best Actor	El mal invisible	Nominated	
