= Francesc Garrido =

Spanish film, television and stage actor (1969–2026)

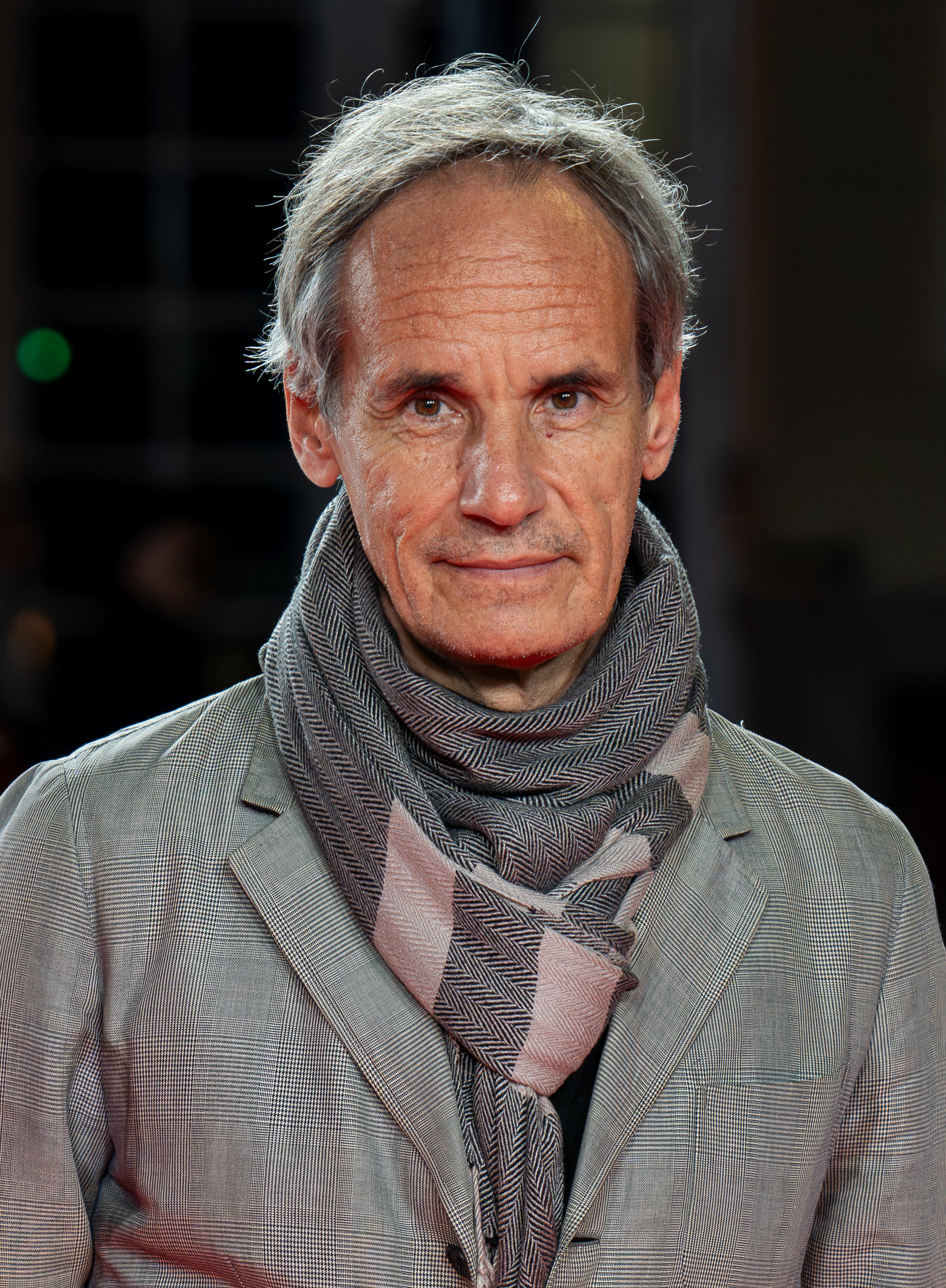
- Garrido in 2026
- Born: 7 September 1969; Barcelona, Spain
- Died: 30 August 2026 (aged 56)
- Education: Institut del Teatre; London Academy of Music and Dramatic Art

Francesc Garrido (7 September 1969 – 30 August 2026) was a Spanish film, television and stage actor from Catalonia.

== Life and career ==
Francesc Garrido was born in Barcelona on 7 September 1969. He trained his acting chops at the Barcelona's Institut del Teatre, further advancing his training in the performing arts at the London Academy of Music and Dramatic Art.

After making his big screen debut in The City of Marvels (1999), he featured in Catalan and Spanish-language films such as Smoking Room, The Sea Inside, Alatriste (as Martín Saldaña), Theresa: The Body of Christ (as Salcedo), 25 Carat (as Abel), Falling Star (as Minister Serrano) L'adopció, and Barcelona 1714.

Garrido starred in leading television roles as Juan Elías, a mysterious man with amnesia in Sé quién eres, and as inspector Yago Costa in La sala. Other main television credits include performances in Los hombres de Paco (as Portillo), Gran Reserva (as Pablo Cortázar, the illegitimate first born son of Don Vicente Cortázar), The Time in Between (as comisario Claudio Vázquez, a sort of protector of the protagonist), Isabel (as Juan Rodríguez de Fonseca), Three Days of Christmas (as Mateo), Jaguar (as Marsé), and The Gypsy Bride (as Buendía).

Garrido died of a heart attack on the evening of 30 August 2026, aged 56.

== Accolades ==
Year	Award	Category	Work	Result	Ref.
2015	7th Gaudí Awards	Best Supporting Actor	Falling Star	Nominated	
2016	8th Gaudí Awards	Best Actor	L'adopció	Nominated	
2017	19th Iris Awards	Best Actor	Sé quién eres	Nominated	
2018	5th Feroz Awards	Best Actor in a Television Series	Sé quién eres	Nominated	
