= Anchor and Hope =

- Spanish: Tierra firme
- Directed by: Carlos Marques-Marcet
- Screenplay by: Carlos Marques-Marcet; Jules Nurrish
- Based on: Maternidades subversivas by María Llopis
- Produced by: Jana Díaz-Juhl; Pau Brunet; Danielle Schleif; Axel Shalson
- Starring: Oona Chaplin; Natalia Tena; David Verdaguer; Geraldine Chaplin
- Cinematography: Dagmar Weaver-Madsen
- Edited by: Juliana Montañés; David Gallart; Carlos Marques-Marcet
- Music by: Merche Blasco
- Production companies: Lastor Media; Vennerfilm; La Panda Productions
- Distributed by: Avalon Distribución (es); Network (uk)
- Release dates: 10 October 2017 (BFI London Film Festival); 24 November 2017 (Spain); 28 September 2018 (United Kingdom)
- Running time: 113 minutes
- Countries: Spain; United Kingdom
- Languages: English; Spanish

Anchor and Hope (Spanish: Tierra firme) is a 2017 Spanish-British romantic comedy-drama film directed by Carlos Marques-Marcet. The screenplay, written by Marques-Marcet and Jules Nurrish, was inspired by Maternidades subversivas by María Llopis (Spain, 2015). It stars Oona Chaplin, Natalia Tena, David Verdaguer, and Geraldine Chaplin. The film had its world premiere at the BFI London Film Festival on 10 October 2017.

== Plot ==
Eva and Kat's humble, yet carefree, life in their London canal boat is turned upside down when Eva gives Kat an ultimatum: she wants a child. Kat resists, knowing that it will end the bohemian lifestyle she's always envisaged with Eva. When Kat's best friend from Barcelona, Roger, stops by to party with them, the three toy around with the idea of creating a baby together. Feeling backed into a corner, Kat consents. Surprisingly, the unusual do-it-yourself donor insemination is successful. As Eva enjoys her pregnancy and Roger fantasizes about his role in the new family, Kat begins to feel like a third wheel and starts to distance herself. When Eva has an unexpected miscarriage, everyone's true feelings are laid bare, leading Eva and Kat to break up while Roger prepares to go back to Barcelona. The three soon realize, however, that they can't survive without each other, and a new journey begins to build a family.

== Cast ==
- Oona Chaplin as Eva
- Natalia Tena as Kat
- David Verdaguer as Roger
- Geraldine Chaplin as Germaine
- Becky Bullman as Vicky
- Lara Rossi as Jinx

== Development and production ==
The screenplay was influenced by the 2015 political book Maternidades subversivas by María Llopis. Principal photography began in London on 5 September 2016.

Anchor and Hope was produced by Lastor Media, Vennerfilm, and La Panda Productions, with financing also provided by the Department of Culture of the Generalitat de Catalunya and the MEDIA Programme of Creative Europe.

Avalon Distribución acquired the distribution rights in Spain for Tierra firme (Anchor and Hope) in August 2017. International rights for Anchor and Hope was acquired by Visit Films in October 2017. In May 2018, Network acquired the distribution rights to the United Kingdom from Visit Films, with rights to the United States picked up by Wolfe Releasing.

== Release ==
Anchor and Hope held its world premiere on 10 October 2017 at the BFI London Film Festival. It premiered theatrically in Spain on 24 November 2017, and in the United Kingdom on 28 September 2018.

=== Home media ===
Anchor and Hope became available as video on demand in the United States on 20 November 2018. The DVD was released by Wolfe Video in Region 1 on 27 November 2018. In the U.S., the film became available for streaming on Netflix on 15 February 2019.

== Reception ==
=== Critical response ===
On review aggregator Rotten Tomatoes, Anchor and Hope has a 76% rating based on 29 reviews, and an average rating of 6.6/10. On Metacritic, the film has a score of 67 (out of 100) based on 9 reviews from mainstream critics, indicating "generally favorable reviews".

It was named one of the "best queer films of 2018" by IndieWire. Female-centered film productions reviewer Womentainment said Eva and Kat's story was presented "in the most honest, heartfelt and beautiful way."

== Accolades ==
Year	Award	Category	Nominee(s)	Result	Ref.
2018	5th Feroz Awards	Best Comedy Film		Nominated	
2018	10th Gaudí Awards	Best Film Not in the Catalan Language		Won	
2018	10th Gaudí Awards	Best Director	Carlos Marques-Marcet	Nominated	
2018	10th Gaudí Awards	Best Screenplay	Carlos Marques-Marcet, Jules Nurrish	Nominated	
2018	10th Gaudí Awards	Best Actress	Oona Chaplin	Nominated	
2018	10th Gaudí Awards	Best Actor	David Verdaguer	Won	
2018	10th Gaudí Awards	Best Production Supervision	Sergi Moreno, Sophie Venner	Nominated	
2018	10th Gaudí Awards	Best Art Direction	Tim Dickel	Nominated	
2018	10th Gaudí Awards	Best Supporting Actress	Natalia Tena	Nominated	
2018	10th Gaudí Awards	Best Cinematography	Dagmar Weaver-Madsen	Nominated	
2018	10th Gaudí Awards	Best Costume Design	Vinyet Escobar	Nominated	
2018	10th Gaudí Awards	Best Sound	Diego Casares, Jonathan Darch, Dani Zacharias	Nominated	
2018	27th Actors and Actresses Union Awards	Best Film Actress in a Minor Role	Geraldine Chaplin	Won	
