= The Three Wise Kings vs Santa =

- Film poster
- Spanish: Reyes contra Santa
- Directed by: Paco Caballero
- Screenplay by: Carmen López-Areal; Benjamín Herranz; Jelen Morales; Eric Navarro
- Starring: Karra Elejalde; David Verdaguer; Matías Janick
- Cinematography: David Valldepérez
- Edited by: Nacho Ruiz Capillas
- Music by: Pilar Onares
- Production companies: Morena Films; Melchor, Gaspar y Baltasar AIE
- Distributed by: Tripictures
- Release dates: 5 November 2022 (Seville); 18 November 2022 (Spain)
- Country: Spain
- Language: Spanish

The Three Wise Kings vs Santa (Spanish: Reyes contra Santa) is a 2022 Spanish Christmas comedy film directed by Paco Caballero. It stars Karra Elejalde, David Verdaguer, and Matías Janick as the Three Wise Men alongside Adal Ramones, Andrés Almeida and Eva Ugarte, Isa Montalbán, Cosette Silguero, and Laura Quirós, among others.

== Plot ==
The Three Wise Men and Santa vie for the children's attention, unbeknownst that their struggle will wake the Krampus from its slumber.

== Cast ==
- Karra Elejalde as Melchor
- David Verdaguer as Caspar
- Matías Janick as Balthazar
- Andrés Almeida as Santa Claus
- Adal Ramones as Mayor Sandoval
- Eva Ugarte as Belén
- Isa Montalbán as Ana
- Cosette Silguero as Bea
- Laura Quirós as Sofía
- Karina Kolokolchykova as Snegurochka
- Luis Sacristán as Elf 1
- Noelia Noto as Befana
- Josean Bengoetxea as Olentzero
- Daniel Méndez as Yule goat
- José Antonio Tíscar as Tió de Nadal
- Tomás Pozzi as Tomte

== Production ==
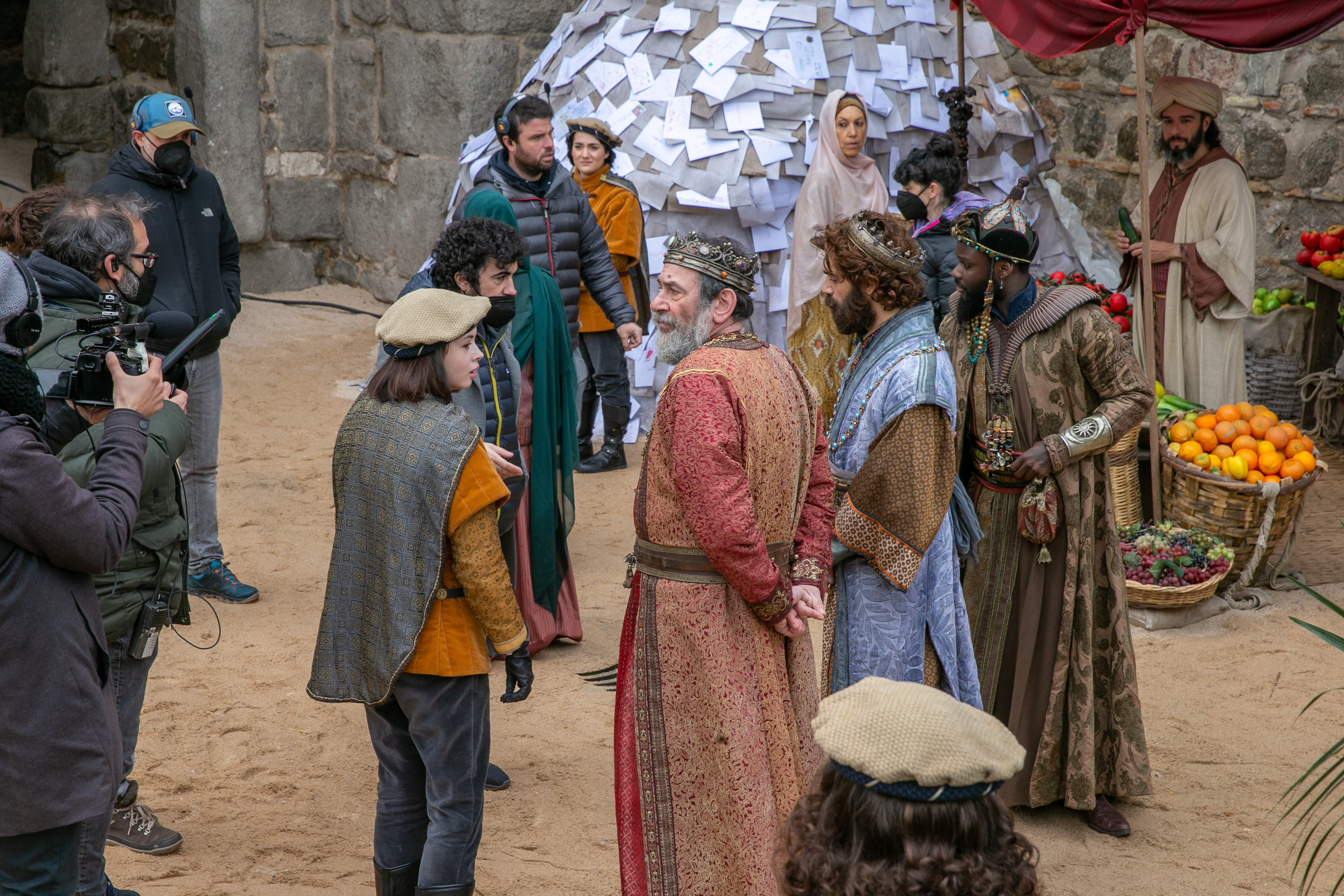
Film set in Toledo, with Montalbán, Elejalde, Verdaguer and Janick paying attention to Caballero.

The screenplay was penned by Carmen López-Areal, Benjamín Herranz, Jelen Morales and Eric Navarro. The Three Wise Kings vs Santa is a Morena Films and Melchor, Gaspar y Baltasar AIE production, and it had the participation of Prime Video and RTVE and support from the Government of Castilla–La Mancha. Shooting locations included Toledo, Segovia, Madrid and the Canary Islands. Shooting had already wrapped by May 2022. David Valldepérez worked as cinematographer, Nacho Ruiz Capillas as film editor whilst Pilar Onares was responsible for the music.

== Release ==
The film had its world premiere at the 19th Seville European Film Festival in November 2022. Distributed by Tripictures, it was set to open in Spanish theatres on 18 November 2022 and to be released on Amazon Prime Video following the theatrical window.

== See also ==
- List of Spanish films of 2022
- List of Christmas films
- Santa Claus in film
