= Falling Star (film) =

- Italian: Stella cadente
- Directed by: Lluís Miñarro
- Screenplay by: Lluís Miñarro; Sergi Belbel
- Starring: Alex Brendemühl; Lola Dueñas; Lorenzo Balducci; Bárbara Lennie; Francesc Garrido; Àlex Batllori; Gonzalo Cunill; Francesc Orella
- Cinematography: Jimmy Gimferrer
- Edited by: Núria Esquerra
- Production company: Eddie Saeta
- Release dates: January 2014 (Rotterdam); 30 May 2014 (Spain)
- Country: Spain
- Languages: Catalan; Spanish

Falling Star (Italian: Stella cadente) is a 2014 Spanish historical film directed by Lluís Miñarro which stars Alex Brendemühl as King Amadeo. It features dialogue in Catalan and Spanish.

== Plot ==
Including surrealist elements and erotic scenes and starting in 1870, the plot follows the ill reign of Amadeo, King of Spain and his attempts to modernize an ungovernable country.

== Cast ==
- Alex Brendemühl as Amadeo
- Lola Dueñas as cuinera
- Lorenzo Balducci as assistent del rei
- Bárbara Lennie as María Victoria
- Francesc Garrido as ministre Serrano
- Àlex Batllori as criat jove
- Gonzalo Cunill as ministre Zorrilla
- Francesc Orella as bisbe

== Production ==
The film is an Eddie Saeta production. It was shot in Barcelona and southern Italy.

== Release ==
The film made its world premiere at the 2014 International Film Festival Rotterdam. It was theatrically released in Spain on 30 May 2014.

== Reception ==
Jay Weissberg of Variety pointed out that the helmer is interested in "a surreal-absurdist mood piece wedded to camp aesthetics", with the film resulting rather in to "a hothouse fantasy rather than a historical biopic".

Neil Young of The Hollywood Reporter summed up the film as "a royal treat: crisply sumptuous, wryly offbeat glimpses into an obscure Spanish monarch's ill-fated reign.".

Daniel de Partearroyo of Cinemanía rated the film 3½ out of 5 stars, considering that Brendemühl is "exultant and hilarious".

== Accolades ==
Year	Award	Category	Nominee(s)	Result	Ref.
2014	1st Fénix Awards	Best Actor	Alex Brendemühl	Nominated	
2014	1st Fénix Awards	Best Art Direction	Sebastián Vogler	Nominated	
2015	7th Gaudí Awards	Best Film		Nominated	
2015	7th Gaudí Awards	Best Director	Lluís Miñarro	Nominated	
2015	7th Gaudí Awards	Best Screenplay	Lluís Miñarro, Sergi Belbel	Nominated	
2015	7th Gaudí Awards	Best Actor	Àlex Brendemühl	Nominated	
2015	7th Gaudí Awards	Best Actress	Bárbara Lennie	Nominated	
2015	7th Gaudí Awards	Best Supporting Actor	Àlex Batllori	Nominated	
2015	7th Gaudí Awards	Best Supporting Actor	Francesc Garrido	Nominated	
2015	7th Gaudí Awards	Best Art Direction	Sebastián Vogler	Won	
2015	7th Gaudí Awards	Best Editing	Núria Esquerra	Nominated	
2015	7th Gaudí Awards	Best Cinematography	Jimmy Gimferrer	Nominated	
2015	7th Gaudí Awards	Best Costume Design	Núria Esquerra	Won	
2015	7th Gaudí Awards	Best Sound	Dani Fontrodona, Alejandro Castillo, Ricard Casals	Nominated	
2015	7th Gaudí Awards	Best Makeup and Hairstyles	Ignasi Ruiz	Nominated	

== See also ==
- List of Spanish films of 2014
