= White Christmas (Black Mirror) =

- Black Mirror episodes
- Matt (Jon Hamm) talks to the digital clone inside a "cookie".
- Episode nos.: Episodes 7 (Note: A special episode following series two and preceding series three, "White Christmas" is the seventh episode overall.)
- Directed by: Carl Tibbetts
- Written by: Charlie Brooker
- Cinematography by: George Steel
- Editing by: Ben Yeates
- Original air date: 16 December 2014
- Running time: 74 minutes

Guest appearances
- Jon Hamm as Matt Trent; Rafe Spall as Joe Potter; Oona Chaplin as Greta; Natalia Tena as Jennifer; Janet Montgomery as Beth Grey; Rasmus Hardiker as Harry

Episode chronology
← Previous "The Waldo Moment"	Next → "Nosedive"

"White Christmas" is a 2014 Christmas special of the British science fiction anthology series Black Mirror. It was written by series creator and showrunner Charlie Brooker and directed by Carl Tibbetts, first airing on Channel 4 on 16 December 2014. Agreed as a one-off special after Channel 4 rejected potential series three scripts, the episode was the last to air before the programme moved to Netflix.

The episode explores three stories told by Matt (Jon Hamm, who was the first American actor to participate in an episode) and Joe (Rafe Spall) from a remote cabin on Christmas Day. The first follows a man attempting to seduce a woman at a Christmas party while receiving remote guidance; the second sees Matt at his job training "cookies", digital clones of people; and the third shows Joe obsessed over an ex-fiancée after the relationship abruptly ends. Topics depicted include pickup artistry, artificial intelligence and consciousness, as well as the concept of Internet blocking extrapolated into real life.

Filming took place in London with a restrictive budget and timescale. Easter egg references are made to each previous episode and a "Z-Eyes" technology which records hearing and vision has the same design and similar functionality to the "grain" from series one's "The Entire History of You". The episode received mostly positive reviews and was nominated for multiple awards, including an International Emmy Award for Best Actor with Spall as the nominee.

== Plot ==
Joe Potter (Rafe Spall) and Matt Trent (Jon Hamm), have lived together in a cabin for five years but barely speak. On Christmas Day, Matt explains why he ended up in the cabin. He used to work as an advisor that would talk less confident or social people through the process of meeting women using "Z-Eyes" – implants that transmit the user's vision and hearing. Some members would watch voyeuristically and contribute advice while Matt relayed advice in real time. One client, Harry (Rasmus Hardiker), crashed an office Christmas party and met the mentally ill Jennifer (Natalia Tena), who mistook Harry's communication with the group for auditory hallucinations similar to her own. She subsequently invited him home and poisoned them both in a murder-suicide.

Matt then discusses his other former job, training "cookies"—digital clones of people stored in an egg-shaped object—as personal assistants. He describes the experience of Greta's (Oona Chaplin) cookie, which refused to be an assistant only to relent once Matt made six months pass in the cookie's world in a matter of seconds.

Joe then opens up about his own past, explaining that he was "blocked" by his fiancée Beth (Janet Montgomery) after the two fought over her decision to have an abortion, causing them to see each other as grey silhouettes and preventing him from contacting her. Months later, Joe confronted her still-pregnant silhouette and was arrested. Each Christmas Eve, Joe travelled to Beth's father's house to secretly watch Beth and her daughter, to whom the block extends. After Beth died in a train accident, the block was removed, and Joe went to the home to see Beth's daughter, only to discover that she was the product of an affair. When Beth's father confronted him, Joe bludgeoned him to death with a snow globe and fled, leaving the girl alone. Seeking help, she wandered into the snowy wilderness, where she froze to death.

While Joe tells the story, the cabin gradually transforms into Beth's father's house. It is revealed that Joe and Matt are in a cookie, the five years resulting from altered perception of time, and Joe is a cookie clone who has just given testimony which will be used to convict the real Joe. For his service, Matt avoids imprisonment for his role in Harry's death, but he is now registered as a sex offender, permanently blocked by everyone and will have to live the rest of his life as a social pariah. Meanwhile, an officer sets the Joe cookie to experience time at 1,000 years per minute, with Wizzard's "I Wish It Could Be Christmas Every Day"—which played as Joe killed Beth's father—on repeat.

== Production ==
Following the second series of Black Mirror, Channel 4 agreed to a third series of four episodes on the condition that detailed synopses of episodes were given. After presenting some ideas, series creator Charlie Brooker and executive producer Annabel Jones were told that they "weren't very Black Mirror", leaving the show in a limbo situation. A year later, Brooker and Jones were able to negotiate a 90-minute Christmas special, "White Christmas". The episode incorporated one of the ideas they had pitched, "Angel of the Morning". It was the last Black Mirror episode produced under Channel 4; following this, the series moved to Netflix. "White Christmas" aired on 16 December 2014 in the United Kingdom.

=== Conception and writing ===
The episode was written by Brooker. Inspirations for the episode include Dead of Night and Twilight Zone: The Movie, both of which are anthologies. The setting of a spaceship was briefly considered. The first story about dating featured Matt, Harry and Jennifer. It was inspired by Brooker's observations of people on the street using Bluetooth headsets for calls, who looked like they were talking to themselves "as if they had a mental illness". The horse anecdote was inspired by Brooker reading "bullshit ice-breakers" used by pickup artists. Brooker later commented that the story was timely in the context of pickup artist Julien Blanc being denied a visa to the United Kingdom.

The second story, where Matt sets up Greta's cookie, was inspired by the comedic idea of someone who "put a consciousness into a toaster", and the toaster then falls in love with them. Brooker had considered this idea for a while, and realised it was a "fucking nightmare" rather than a love story. One draft of the story showed Greta's cookie watching Greta play with her kids, realising that she would never be able to hug her children again. This scene was rejected as "too weird and nasty" for the episode, but later used in series four episode "Black Museum".

The third story is about Joe and his girlfriend Beth. It was based on an idea from Brooker's 2001 series Unnovations in which a pair of glasses showed homeless people as cartoon characters. With the invention of Google Glass, this looked more possible in reality. The idea of blocking on social media was also considered. The ending takes inspiration from Stephen King's 1981 short story "The Jaunt" and the 1982 series finale of Sapphire & Steel.

=== Casting ===
The episode was directed by Carl Tibbetts, who had previously directed series two episode "White Bear". Jon Hamm was cast as Matt Trent; he had enjoyed the programme on DirecTV after Bill Hader recommended it to him. In mid-2014, Hamm was in the U.K. for press appearances and asked his agent if they knew anyone who knew Brooker: by chance, the agent had just signed him and they met up along with Jones. In the first draft, Matt was cheerful and cockney to contrast with Joe. Whilst the original version portrayed Matt as slightly grating, Hamm was keen for his character to be likeable and affable as a contrast to his odious actions.

Joe is played by Rafe Spall, who had previously read a script for another Black Mirror episode. Spall welcomed an anthology series role, having found that he needed a "huge amount of energy" to commit to long-running serialised shows so that he could understand all relevant storylines. Oona Chaplin was cast as Greta, roughly two days before filming, while working in Los Angeles.

=== Filming, music and editing ===
For the setting, a slightly futuristic London and a world in which the characters lived on boats were both considered. However, the episode had a very limited budget. Filming took place in disparate areas of London within a short period of time, which posed a challenge. Sets were built at Twickenham, which would be used during production of later Black Mirror series. The cabin was designed to look timeless, with Matt's outfit looking cleaner than the environment, while Joe's is warm. The episode was shot in October 2014, during a period when Hamm and Spall both had heavy colds.

The episode opens with Joe and the viewer first sees Matt through his eyes. Joe is initially very quiet and not able to recall precisely why he is in the cabin. Every time the cabin is shown, some details are changed until it becomes the house in which Joe commits the murder. The cooker, work surface, fireplace and clock are some of these details. Additionally, at one point Joe hears a noise which is his cell hatch sliding shut as someone checks on him.

The soundtrack was composed by Jon Opstad. The colour palettes, costumes and soundtrack of the three stories are designed to be similar to each other, to give the episode an overarching identity. The first story has monochrome tones and a "lopsided weirdness" to its soundtrack; Jennifer's dress is made of navy leather and mesh to signify her role as a dominatrix. Unprecedented for the show, the segment reuses technology from another episode: after several designs for the Z-Eyes, it was decided that the "grain" device from series one episode "The Entire History of You" should be used.

Jetlagged, Chaplin fell asleep during some of her early scenes, which required her to lie down on an operating table. Greta wears an outfit similar to a kimono, to indicate her relaxed demeanour, while her cookie wears a neoprene fabric. The score for the second story is "crisp, clean [and] sterile", using digital synths to contrast with the rest of the soundtrack. The third story changes "from romance to tragedy", so its score incorporates a viola. A scene where Beth struggles to get a vomiting Joe into a taxi was cut from filming due to time constraints.

The ending shows Joe smashing the radio repeatedly, as it reappears each time. It was decided on the day that this should be filmed in one continuous take, with stagehands quickly replacing the radio on the table; this was difficult due to their limited supply of radios. A shot of Joe smashing the snow globe, only for it to reappear, was cut. During filming, Brooker had an idea for the closing moments, which show the camera continually panning out from the cabin to show it inside a snow globe. The effect used many different takes as well as visual effects. Editing took place up to the day of its press screening at Channel 4, leading Brooker to delay work on his annual review special 2014 Wipe for the BBC.

== Analysis ==
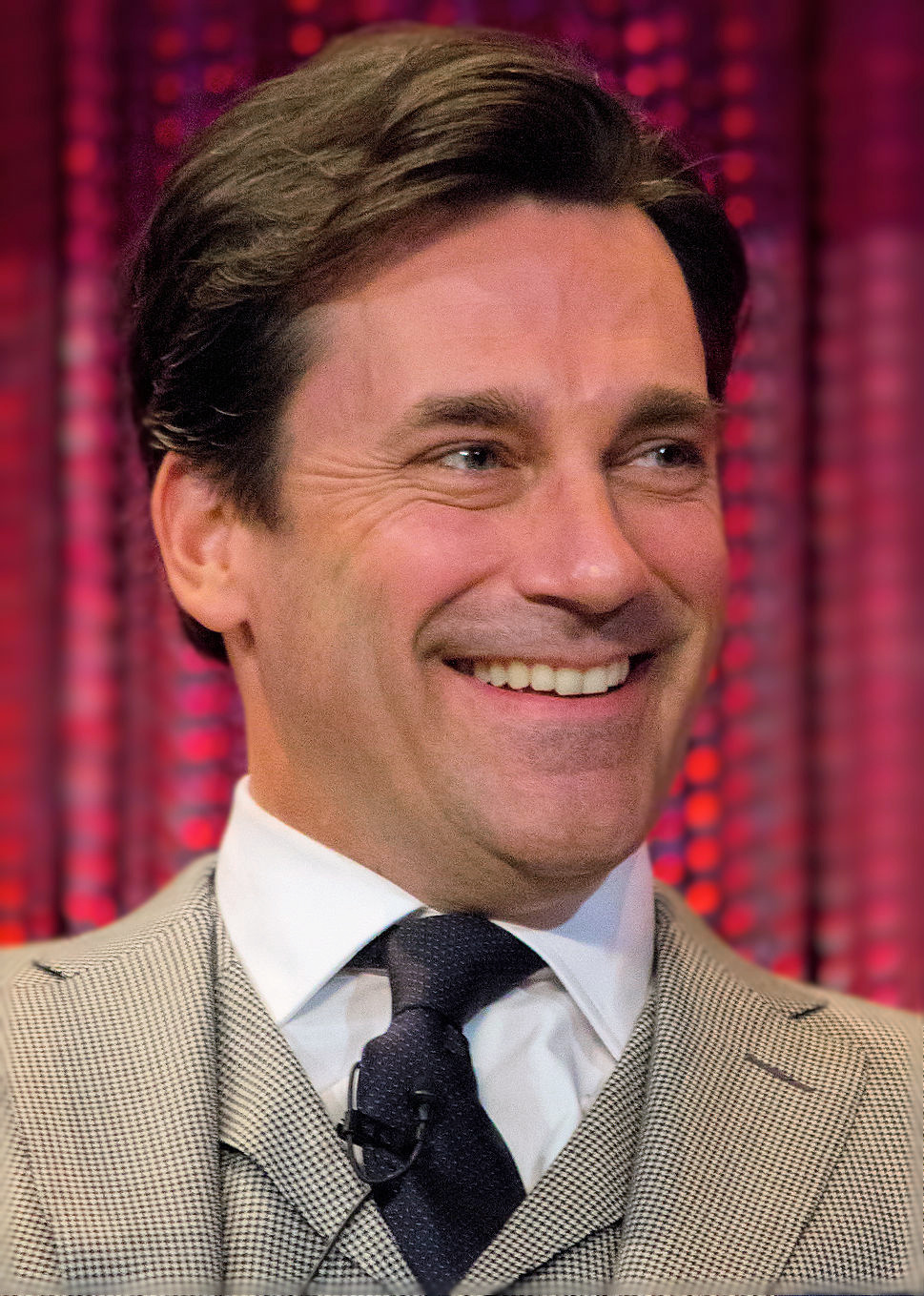
Jon Hamm played Don Draper in Mad Men, a character compared to his role as Matt.

The episode has a dark tone, as with other Black Mirror installments, and aspects of horror. For instance, Ellen Jones of The Independent found the episode "genuinely unsettling". Louisa Mellor of Den of Geek found it to additionally contain elements of pathos and humour. IGN's Daniel Krupa found it to be a "macabre morality tale" that drew from "the potential misery" associated with Christmas. Mark Monahan of The Telegraph compared the storyline in which Harry is poisoned to "The Landlady", a short story by Roald Dahl also featuring a poisoner. Making a second Dahl comparison, Monahan found the segment with Greta similar to "William and Mary", in which William is revived after death in the form of a few functioning body parts that lack agency.

The settings accentuate the themes. According to Shelli Nicole in Architectural Digest, the "stark white, hyperminimal, and eerily pristine" scenes of Greta's home, cookie and hospital room contribute to the recurring feeling of detachment. Mellor noted that Matt sharpening knives at one point heightened a subtext of "menace and unpredictability" between Matt and Joe, while several prison-related references foreshadow the twist, including Joe's room layout, the noise of a cell hatch opening, Matt's line "it's not an interrogation" and Joe's line "it's a job, not a jail".

Both Joe and Matt are unreliable narrators. According to Zack Handlen, writing for The A.V. Club, Matt resembles Hamm's Mad Men persona Don Draper in that both have a "fundamental character flaw" of cowardice which is not so obvious that people would find it untrustworthy. Handlen believed that Hamm found a "link" between "the Perfect Man" and "the pathetic striver" that "defines them", in the case of both Draper and Matt. Vulture's Abraham Riesman saw Matt and Joe as showing that "even empathetic people can ruin lives", a point emphasised in Matt telling Joe: "You're empathetic. You care about people." With Joe, Brooker commented that the viewer quickly loses sympathy in the third story, as he is obnoxious towards Beth and is hinted to have an issue with alcohol. Joe is "possessive and has an explosive temper" and Brooker believes him to be the "root cause" of the issues in his and Beth's relationship. Handlen saw Joe as unable to process his relationship with Beth ending or her pregnancy, because Beth blocked him, preventing resolution. On whether Joe deserved his punishment, Brooker said "he did and he didn't". He thought viewers may find Matt's predicament harsh because of his charm, with Hamm opining that Matt deserved punishment but should have a path to redemption.

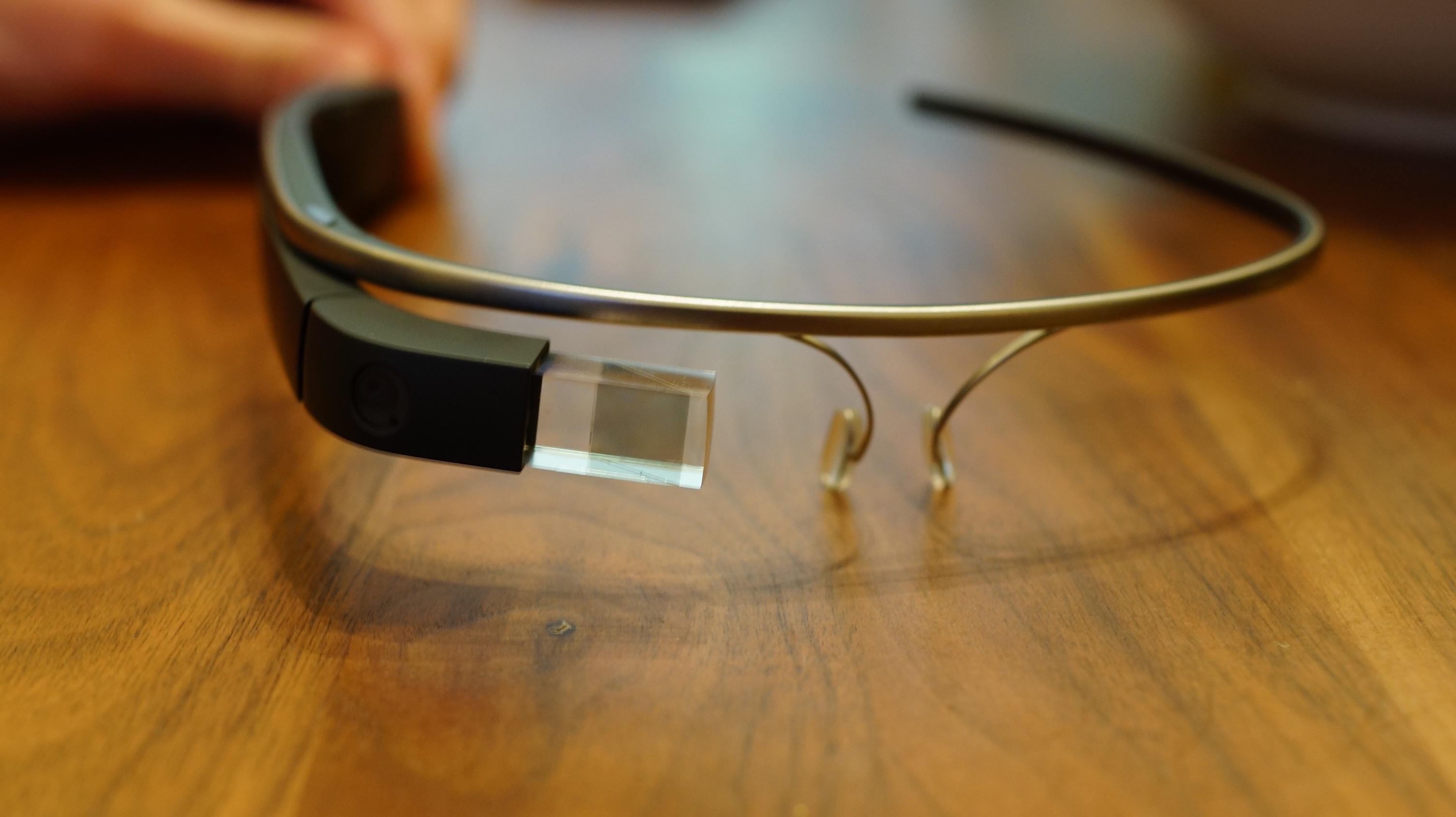
Google Glass was widely seen as an inspiration for the Z-Eyes.

The episode addresses many themes, prominent ones including artificial intelligence (AI), social networking and cyberstalking. Finding the themes to be "classic" for the series, The Guardian's Ben Beaumont-Thomas noted "a desperate yearning for human connection" relating to many of them. Critics widely compared the Z-Eyes to the 2013 Google Glass and other wearable technology, as did Brooker himself. Describing the Z-Eyes as an "embedded technology", Krupa summarised them as "contact lenses which control our perception of reality and cannot be removed". The second story shows a use for AI in home automation, known in the episode as a "cookie". Brooker said that the episode asks whether AI can be "a form of life". Sam Wollaston of The Guardian found that the cookie raised questions over whether AI have rights relating to slavery, torture and parenthood. Mellor related the cookie to the smart speakers Amazon Echo, first released in 2014. Riesman saw the episode as addressing topical issues such as police brutality and compared Matt and Joe to men's rights activists such as those involved in the Gamergate harassment campaign.

Brooker thought the episode may have been the last for the programme, so he included Easter eggs which referred to previous episodes. References are made to "The Waldo Moment", where Waldo is a character on a fictional comedy programme that is shown in "White Christmas" as Joe flicks through television channels. One of Matt's pickup artistry clients has the username "I_AM_WALDO". Similarly, Joe flicks past Hot Shot and a client has the username "Pie Ape", in reference to two shows within the story of "Fifteen Million Merits". The ticker during a news report mentions Michael Callow from "The National Anthem", as well as Victoria Skillane from "White Bear", and Liam Monroe from "The Waldo Moment". Beth sings "Anyone Who Knows What Love Is", the same song that Abi sings in "Fifteen Million Merits". As Joe's jail cell closes, the symbol that was a recurring motif in "White Bear" appears. The pregnancy test Joe finds uses the same positive result animation as Martha's in "Be Right Back". Taken in addition with the Z-Eyes design reused from "The Entire History of You", this evidences that "White Christmas" makes reference to each of the six previous episodes.

== Reception ==
On 16 December 2014, the episode aired on Channel 4 at 9 p.m. The Broadcasters' Audience Research Board reported figures of 1.66 million viewers in the first 7 days, and 2.07 million viewers after 28 days. It received positive critical reception, garnering ratings of 8.5 out of 10 in IGN, four out of five stars in The Telegraph and a B+ in The A.V. Club. On the review aggregator Rotten Tomatoes, the episode holds an approval rating of 90% based on 20 reviews. Handlen found it neither the strongest nor weakest Channel 4 episode of Black Mirror, but "striking and memorable". He viewed each technology as "fascinating enough to warrant entire entries in their own right"; in contrast, Sonia Saraiya of Salon saw the cookies' mechanics as a "misstep". Krupa found the episode to be, of the episodes to that point, the "most in-depth and harrowing exploration of how technology affects our relationships".

The cast was well-received, with Ellen Jones and Krupa reviewing the casting and acting positively. Krupa found that Spall "shines brightest" with "the full depth of his misery", while Handlen highlighted Hamm as "great". Riesman found it "chilling" how much the reader is "drawn into" Hamm's way of thinking. However, Monahan "tired slightly" of Joe's "moroseness" over the course of the episode, and Handlen found Jennifer "more of a punchline than a character".

The special's structure was praised as "excellent" by Monahan, with Krupa saying that "so much of the episode's pleasure derives from seeing its disparate elements connect and intersect". However, Saraiya thought the repetition of technologies and ideas from previous episodes was undesirable. Though Handlen wrote that the episode maintained an "efficient, unceasing suspense" with the questions raised about Matt and Joe, he found that the three stories "don't quite add up to more than the sum of their parts". Monahan said that he "one half-guessed" Joe's situation. Ellen Jones found the storyline threads to be "neatly, nightmarishly tied up" by the end and Mellor reviewed that the final story "ties all the elements of the previous hour with deft efficiency and unblinking bleakness". Saraiya found the episode "thematically satisfying", while Riesman called it "eminently watchable, narratively thrilling, and never preachy".

=== Episode rankings ===
"White Christmas" was ranked as follows on critics' lists of the 23 Black Mirror installments by quality, from best to worst:

- 3rd – Aubrey Page, Collider
- 4th – Ed Power, The Telegraph
- 5th – Morgan Jeffery, Digital Spy
- 7th – Charles Bramesco, Vulture
- 7th – Travis Clark, Business Insider
- 8th – James Hibberd, Entertainment Weekly
- 10th – Matt Donnelly and Tim Molloy, TheWrap
- 21st – Corey Atad, Esquire

Additionally, the episode was rated 3rd of 22 (excluding Bandersnatch) by reviewers at IndieWire, and 6th of 19 by Eric Anthony Glover of Entertainment Tonight, who ranked episodes from the first four series. Proma Khosla of Mashable ranked the 22 Black Mirror instalments excluding Bandersnatch by tone, concluding that "White Christmas" is the 7th-most pessimistic episode of the show. Other critics ranked the 13 episodes in Black Mirror's first three series, where "White Christmas" placed as follows:

- 2nd – Jacob Hall, /Film
- 4th – Adam David, CNN Philippines
- 5th – Andrew Wallenstein, Variety
- 6th – Mat Elfring, GameSpot
- 7th (of the Top Ten) – Brendan Doyle, Comingsoon.net

=== Accolades ===
"White Christmas" was nominated for four awards, including an International Emmy Award.

Awards and nominations received by "White Christmas"
Year	Award	Category	Recipients	Result	Ref.
2015	International Emmy Awards	Best Performance by an Actor	Rafe Spall	Nominated	
2015	RTS Craft & Design Awards	Best Sound: Drama	Jim Goddard, Stuart Hilliker, Dan Green, Alastair Widgery	Nominated	
2016	Broadcast Awards	Best Single Drama	"White Christmas"	Nominated	
2016	RTS Television Awards	Best Single Drama	"White Christmas"	Nominated	

== See also ==
- Metaverse – Collective 3D virtual shared space
- Neuralink – American neurotechnology company
- Spatial computing – Computing paradigm emphasizing 3D spatial interaction with technology
- Sword Art Online – Japanese light novel series and its adaptations
- The Entire History of You
- They Live – 1988 film by John Carpenter
- The Fourth Thursday After Tomorrow – A segment of The Simpsons “Thanksgiving of Horror” which parodies the episode
