= Oona Chaplin =

Actress (born 1986)

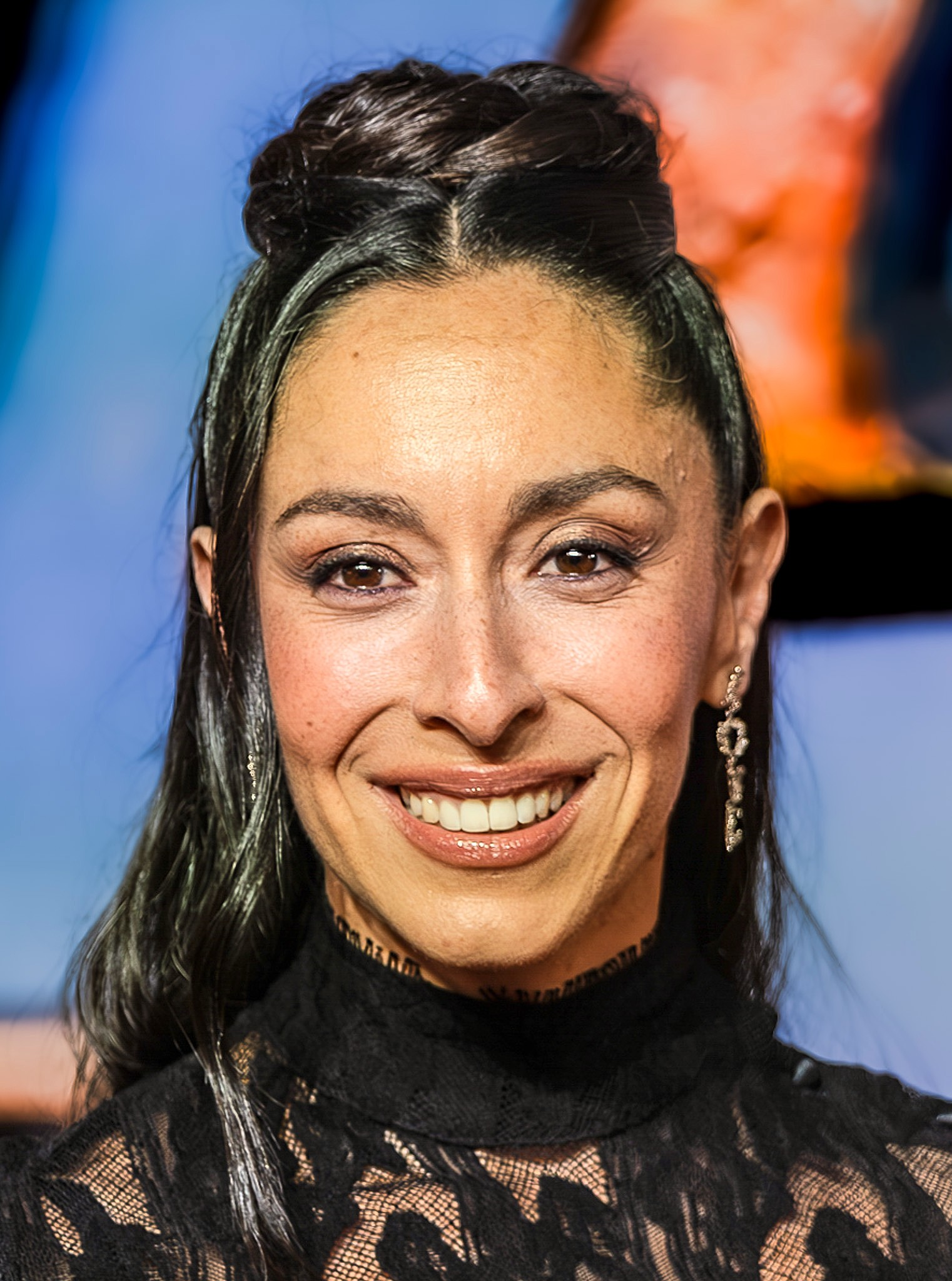
- Chaplin in 2025
- Born: Oona Castilla Chaplin; 4 June 1986 (age 40); Madrid, Spain
- Citizenship: United Kingdom; Spain; Switzerland; Chile
- Education: Royal Academy of Dramatic Art
- Occupation: Actress
- Years active: 2007–present
- Mother: Geraldine Chaplin
- Family: Chaplin

Oona Castilla Chaplin (Spanish: [ˈuna kasˈtiʎa ˈtʃaplin]; born 4 June 1986) is an actress. Her roles include Talisa Maegyr in the HBO TV series Game of Thrones, Kitty Trevelyan in the BBC drama The Crimson Field, Zilpha Geary in the series Taboo, and Varang in the Avatar film series.

== Early life ==
Castilla Chaplin was born in Madrid to English-American actress Geraldine Chaplin and Chilean cinematographer Patricio Castilla. She has a half-brother named Shane from her mother's previous relationship with film director Carlos Saura. Her paternal grandmother, Hilda Valderrama, was a Mapuche human rights lawyer. A member of the Chaplin family, she is a granddaughter of English filmmaker and actor Charlie Chaplin, and great-granddaughter of American playwright Eugene O'Neill. She was named after her maternal grandmother Oona O'Neill, Charlie Chaplin's fourth and final wife.

Growing up, Castilla Chaplin spent time in Spain, the United Kingdom, Switzerland and Cuba. She travelled often because of her mother's film career. She started dancing ballet, salsa and flamenco at an early age.

When Castilla Chaplin was 15, she began studying at Gordonstoun School in Scotland on a drama scholarship. She appeared in several school plays; toured the United Kingdom in an adaptation of Romeo and Juliet; and impersonated her grandfather in the role of Bottom in an adaptation of A Midsummer Night's Dream at the Edinburgh Festival Fringe. After leaving Gordonstoun, she was accepted into the Royal Academy of Dramatic Art (RADA) in London, where she graduated in 2007.

== Career ==
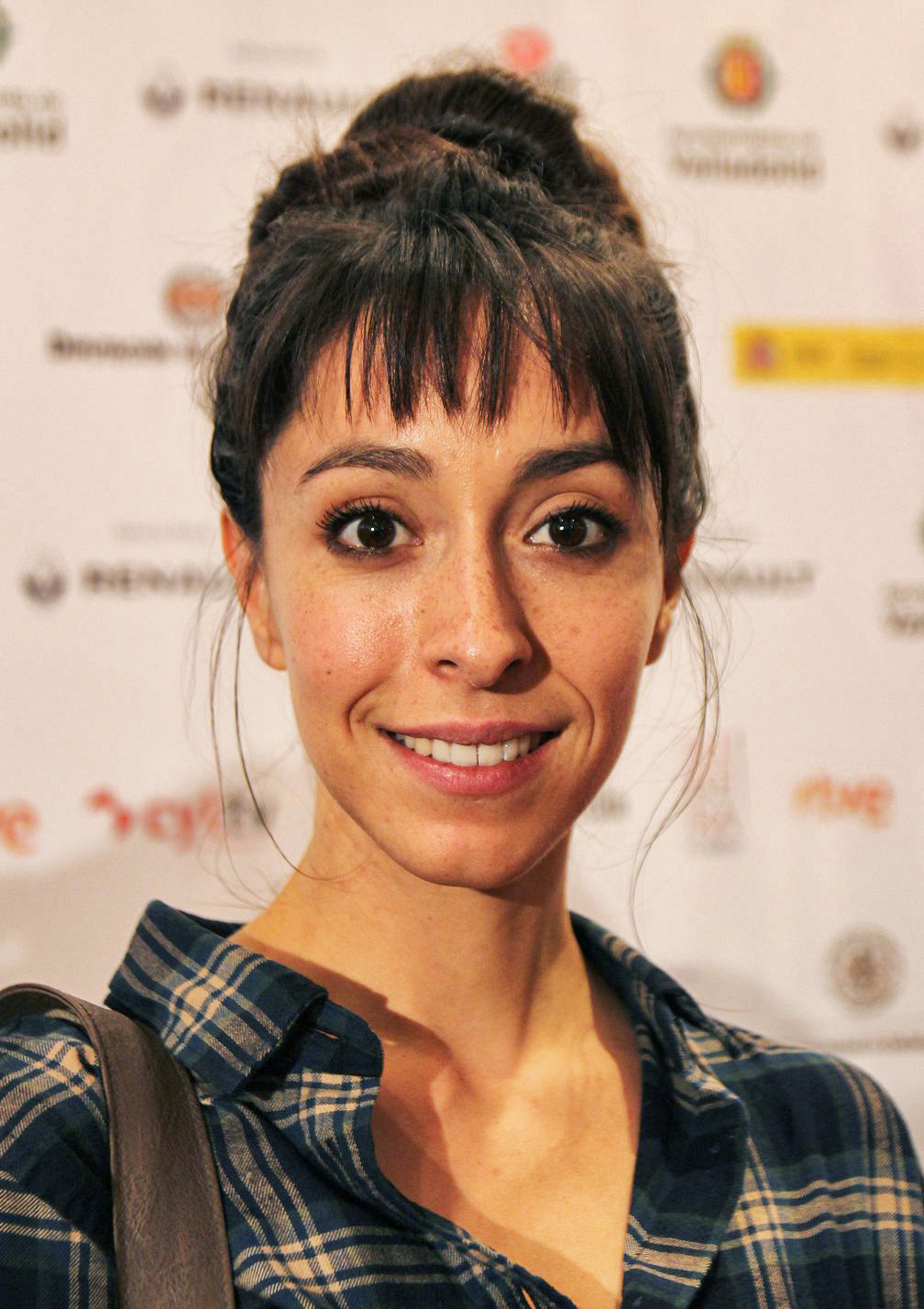
Chaplin in 2016

After graduating from RADA, Castilla Chaplin acted in mainly British and Spanish short and feature films. She has played alongside her mother in the feature films Inconceivable, ¿Para qué sirve un oso?, Imago Mortis and Anchor and Hope. She has had supporting roles in British and American television. She appeared as a Brazilian cage dancer in ITV's Married Single Other (2010); as Marnie Madden, the wife of main character Hector Madden, in the BBC period drama The Hour (2011–2012); as John Watson's girlfriend in "A Scandal in Belgravia", an episode of BBC's Sherlock (2012); and as Talisa Maegyr in HBO's Game of Thrones (2012–2013). She played Kitty Trevelyan, a lead character, in the BBC drama The Crimson Field (2014), and Ira Levinson's wife Ruth Levinson in The Longest Ride (2015).

She starred as Zilpha Geary in the eight-part historical fiction series Taboo (2017) on BBC One and FX. In 2024, she presented the BBC radio documentary Hollywood Exiles, which covered her grandfather's blacklisting by the House Un-American Activities Committee.

In 2025, Castilla Chaplin co-starred in Avatar: Fire and Ash, directed by James Cameron, as the villainous Varang. On casting the relatively unknown Castilla Chaplin, Cameron explained: "There was something [Chaplin] just locked into. There's a sexuality; there's a dominating psychology, and there's a lot of fury. There are a lot of layers to what she's doing there and the forces that are driving her. Oona was able to move fluidly back and forth between those in a way that I wasn't seeing with the others."

== Filmography ==
=== Film ===
Year	Title	Role	Notes
2008	Inconceivable	Laura Chappel	
2008	First, Love?	Laura – Flower Girl	Short film
2008	Quantum of Solace	Perla de las Dunas receptionist	
2009	Imago Mortis	Arianna	
2009	Pelican Blood	Linda	
2010	High and Dry	Sandra	Short film
2010	Vampyre compendium		Short film
2011	¿Para qué sirve un oso?	Rosa	
2011	The Devil's Double	Beauty	
2011	Salar	Sandra	Short film
2012	The Sorrows	Sarah	
2013	Powder Room	Jess	
2013	What if	Julianne	
2014	Purgatorio	Marta	
2014	Aloft	Alice	
2015	The Longest Ride	Ruth Levinson	
2015	Dancing for my Havana	Rosa	
2016	Realive	Naomi	
2017	Anchor and Hope	Eva	
2020	Epicentro	Herself	Documentary
2022	Lullaby	Rachel Brown	
2025	Avatar: Fire and Ash	Varang	

=== Television ===
Year	Title	Role	Notes
2007	Spooks	Kate	Episode: "The Virus (Part 2)"
2008	Spooks: Code 9	Kate	Episode 2
2009	Married Single Other	Fabiana	3 episodes
2010	El Gordo: Una historia verdadera	Silvia	2 episodes
2011–2012	The Hour	Marnie Madden	12 episodes
2012	Sherlock	Jeanette	Episode: "A Scandal in Belgravia"
2012–2013	Game of Thrones	Talisa Maegyr	11 episodes
2013	Dates	Mia	5 episodes
2014	Inside No. 9	Sabrina	Episode: "A Quiet Night In"
2014	The Crimson Field	Kitty Trevelyan	Main role, 6 episodes
2014	Black Mirror	Greta	Feature-length special: "White Christmas"
2016	El padre de Caín	Mercedes	Miniseries
2017	Taboo	Zilpha Geary	Main cast, 8 episodes
2018	My Dinner with Hervé	Katie	Television film
2020	The Comey Rule	Lisa Page	Miniseries
2022	Made for Love	Alice	Episode: "Alice? Are You Listening?"
2022	Treason	Maddy De Costa	Main cast, 5 episodes

== Awards and nominations ==
Association	Year	Category	Work	Result	Ref(s)
Actor Awards	2014	Outstanding Performance by an Ensemble in a Drama Series	Game of Thrones	Nominated	
Austin Film Critics Association Awards	2025	Best Voice Acting, Animated or Digital Performance	Avatar: Fire and Ash	Won	
Critics' Choice Super Awards	2026	Best Actress in a Science Fiction or Fantasy Movie	Avatar: Fire and Ash	Nominated	
Critics' Choice Super Awards	2026	Best Villain in a Movie	Avatar: Fire and Ash	Nominated	
Gaudí Awards	2018	Best Actress	Anchor and Hope	Nominated	
Saturn Awards	2026	Best Supporting Actress	Avatar: Fire and Ash	Nominated	
Washington D.C. Area Film Critics Association Awards	2025	Best Motion Capture Performance	Avatar: Fire and Ash	Nominated	
