= Natalia Tena =

British actress and musician (born 1984)

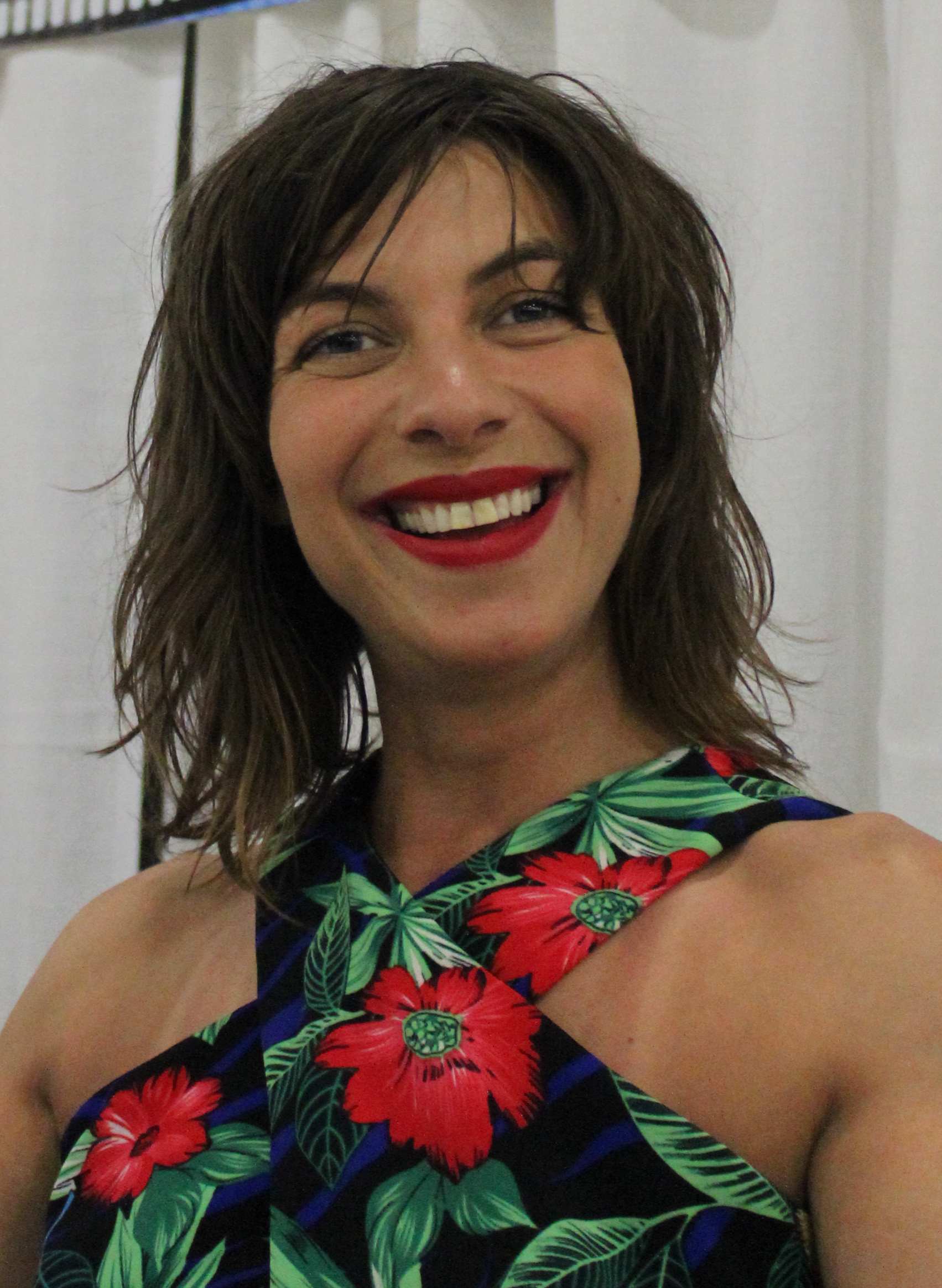
- Tena at the Florida Supercon in 2016
- Born: Natalia Gastiain Tena; Camden, London, England
- Occupations: Actress, musician
- Years active: 2001–present
- Known for: Nymphadora Tonks in Harry Potter franchise; Osha in Game of Thrones

Natalia Gastiain Tena is an English actress and musician. She is best known for playing Nymphadora Tonks in the Harry Potter film series (2007–2011), and the wildling Osha in the HBO series Game of Thrones (2011–2013; 2016).

Tena is the lead singer and accordionist of Molotov Jukebox. The band released their debut album Carnival Flower (2014), in Spring 2014, featuring their single "Neon Lights". Their second studio album, Tropical Gypsy (2016), was released on 15 April 2016 and was preceded by its lead single, "Pineapple Girl". It was promoted on the band's Tropical Gypsy Tour in April and May 2016.

== Early life and education ==
Natalia Gastiain Tena was born in Camden, London, the daughter of Spanish parents, María Tena, a secretary, and Jesús Andrew Gastiain, a carpenter. Her family is of Extremaduran and Basque origin, and she was raised in the United Kingdom.

Tena is fluent in English and Spanish. She attended Bedales School in Hampshire.

She was taught the piano by her mother at five years old, influenced by Chuck Berry's music. Afterwards, at 18, Tena moved back to London and busked on the London Underground. While working with a theatre group called KneeHigh, where they were allowed to pick an instrument to play, Tena decided to learn the accordion.

== Career ==
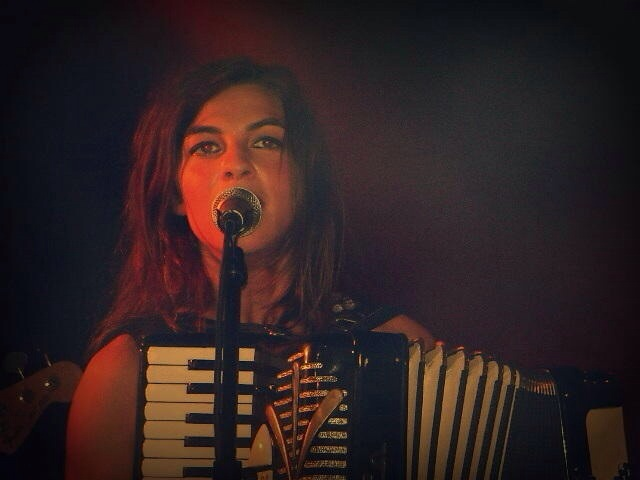
Tena performing in 2013

Tena made her professional debut as Ellie in About a Boy (2002), and began acting full-time in 2003. She has played lead roles in stage adaptations of Gone to Earth in 2004, and Nights at the Circus in 2006.

In 2007, Tena appeared in the film adaptation of Harry Potter and the Order of the Phoenix playing the character Nymphadora Tonks. Tena reprised this role in its sequels Harry Potter and the Half-Blood Prince, in 2009, Harry Potter and the Deathly Hallows – Part 1 in 2010 and Part 2 in 2011.

She hosted a behind-the-scenes featurette entitled "Trailing Tonks" for the subsequent DVD and Blu-ray release, and is credited as producer and director of the featurette, in which she also performs an original Christmas-themed blues song on guitar, which she composed while working as a busker on the London Underground.

In 2011, she played a lead role in the Scottish Film You Instead. She also appeared as Osha in HBO's Game of Thrones. In March 2013, she starred in the official music video for Lapalux's single "Without You (ft. Kerry Leatham)".

In 2014, Tena co-starred as a mentally ill woman in the Black Mirror Christmas episode "White Christmas".

In 2015, she starred as the lead, Jennifer Preston, in the British mini-series Residue. In 2017, Tena was cast as Sara Morten in the CBS drama Wisdom of the Crowd.

Tena played the series regular role of Lana Pierce on the YouTube science fiction series Origin (2018).

== Filmography ==
=== Film ===
Year	Title	Role	Notes
2002	About a Boy	Ellie	Credited as Nat Gastiain Tena
2005	The Fine Art of Love	Vera	
2005	Mrs Henderson Presents	Peggy	
2007	Harry Potter and the Order of the Phoenix	Nymphadora Tonks	
2008	Lecture 21	Thomson	
2009	Harry Potter and the Half-Blood Prince	Nymphadora Tonks	
2010	Womb	Rose	
2010	Ways to Live Forever	Annie	
2010	Harry Potter and the Deathly Hallows – Part 1	Nymphadora Tonks	
2011	Harry Potter and the Deathly Hallows – Part 2	Nymphadora Tonks	
2011	You Instead	Morello	
2012	Bel Ami	Rachel	
2014	10,000 km	Alex	
2015	SuperBob	Dorris	
2017	Amar	Madre de Laura	
2017	Anchor and Hope	Kat	
2020	I Love You, Stupid	Raquel	
2020	Baby	Albinoa	
2023	John Wick: Chapter 4	Katia Javanavič	
2023	Borderline	Joan	
2024	The Platform 2	Sahabat	
2025	El mal	Martín	

=== Television ===
Year	Title	Role	Notes
2005	Doctors	Amy Emerson	Episode: "Boundaries"
2006	Afterlife	Gemma Taylor	Episode 205: "Mirrorball"
2011–2013; 2016	Game of Thrones	Osha	Recurring role (season 1–3, 6)
2012	Shameless	Aparecida	Episode: "The Brazilian Effect"
2012	Falcón	Christine Ferrera	2 episodes
2013	Ambassadors	Tanya	Main role
2013	Black Mirror	Jennifer	Episode: "White Christmas"
2015	Residue	Jennifer Preston	Main role
2015	The Refugees	Emma Oliver	Main role
2017–2018	Wisdom of the Crowd	Sara Morten	Main role
2018	Origin	Lana Pierce	Main role
2019	The Mandalorian	Xi'an	Episode: "Chapter 6: The Prisoner"
2021–present	Wolfe	Val Kinteh	Main role
2022	Vardy v Rooney: A Courtroom Drama	Rebekah Vardy	Main role
2025	Riot Women	Inez	
2026	The Assassin	Cortez	6 episodes

=== Stage ===
Year	Title	Role	Notes
2004	Gone to Earth	Hazel	Shared Experience / UK tour
2005	Bronte	Cathy / Bertha Mason	Shared Experience / UK tour
2006	Nights at the Circus	Fevvers	Kneehigh Theatre / UK tour
2008	The Clean House	Matilde	UK tour
2009	Othello	Desdemona	Royal Shakespeare Company / UK tour
2019	Europe	Katia	Donmar Warehouse

== Accolades ==
Year	Award	Category	Work	Result	Ref.
2014	17th Málaga Film Festival	Silver Biznaga for Best Actress	10,000 km	Won	
2015	20th Forqué Awards	Best Actress	10,000 km	Nominated	
2015	7th Gaudí Awards	Best Actress	10,000 km	Won	
2015	70th CEC Medals	Best New Actress	10,000 km	Nominated	
2015	29th Goya Awards	Best New Actress	10,000 km	Nominated	
2018	10th Gaudí Awards	Best Supporting Actress	Anchor and Hope	Nominated	
