= Summer 1993 =

2017 film

- Film poster
- Original title: Estiu 1993
- Directed by: Carla Simón
- Written by: Carla Simón
- Produced by: Valérie Delpierre; Stefan Schmitz; María Zamora
- Starring: Laia Artigas
- Cinematography: Santiago Racaj
- Edited by: Didac Palou; Ana Pfaff
- Music by: Pau Boïgues; Ernest Pipó
- Production company: Avalon
- Distributed by: Oscilloscope Laboratories
- Release dates: 11 February 2017 (Berlin); 30 June 2017 (Spain)
- Running time: 98 minutes
- Country: Spain
- Language: Catalan
- Box office: $2.7 million

Summer 1993 (Catalan: Estiu 1993) is a 2017 Catalan-language Spanish drama film directed and written by Carla Simón. The film premiered in the Generation section at the 67th Berlin International Film Festival, where it won the GWFF (German: Gesellschaft zur Wahrnehmung von Film- und Fernsehrechten) Best First Feature Award. The movie centers around a six-year-old girl named Frida who is sent to live with her aunt, uncle and cousin during the summer of 1993. It was chosen as the Spanish entry for the Best Foreign Language Film at the 90th Academy Awards, but in the end it was not nominated for an award.

== Summary ==
The film follows Frida (Laia Artigas), a six year old girl who must leave her home in Barcelona following the death of her mother. Frida moves to the Catalan countryside with her aunt Marga (Bruna Cusí), her uncle Esteve (David Verdaguer), and their three year old daughter, Anna (Paula Robles). The movie takes place during the summer of 1993 as Frida adapts to her new life in the country and her role as older sister to her cousin. At first, Frida has difficulties adjusting, as the environment she is surrounded by in the countryside is vastly different from that which she knew in the city. At one point, Frida even considers running away. However, as the film progresses, Frida begins to integrate with her new family and enjoy spending time with them at the pool and at home, where she is seen dancing with her adoptive father. The film concludes at the end of the summer, when Frida finally begins to express her true emotions in the presence of her new family.

== Cast ==
- Laia Artigas as Frida
- Paula Robles as Anna
- Bruna Cusí as Marga
- David Verdaguer as Esteve
- Fermí Reixach as Avi (Abuelo)
- Isabel Rocatti as Avia (Abuela)
- Montse Sanz as Lola
- Etna Campillo as Irene
- Berta Pipó as Tieta Angela
- Paula Blanco as Cesca
- Quimet Pla as Gabriel
- Dolores Fortis as Carnissera
- Tere Sola as Senyora Carnisseria
- Josep Torrent as Doctor
- Cristina Matas as Infermera
- Noemi Pinana as Organizadora
- Ricard Catalina as Matador
- Jordi Figueras as Blai
- Arnau Ferrer as Cosi

== Plot ==
Frida, a six-year-old girl, sits in her deceased mother's apartment in Barcelona as her extended family packs it up. Frida's grandmother teaches her the Lord's Prayer and gives her a card from her mother's first communion. Frida's leaves Barcelona with her aunt and uncle, Marga and Esteve, for their home in the countryside. Frida begins adjusting to life with her three-year-old adoptive sister, Anna, and the animals on the family farm. Frida finds a statue of Saint Rita of Cascia in the woods. Throughout the film, she returns to this spot to leave gifts for her mother.

Marga introduces Frida to others in the town while running errands, and acquaintances discuss whether Frida's mother died of pneumonia or something else. Marga takes Frida to a doctor's office. On the way there, Frida is upset and throws a comb offered to her by Marga out the window. Frida gets blood drawn, and she says that her doctor in Barcelona had said that no more tests were needed. The doctor tells Marga that they want more tests to be sure that Frida is healthy, "considering her background," and he prescribes antihistamines for an itchy spot on Frida's arm.

At home, Frida and Anna play at mother and daughter: Frida puts on makeup and repeats to Anna that she's sore and needs to rest. Marga, Frida, and Ana go into town and watch a group of children practicing for the town's Feast of Saint James procession. Afterwards, a group of children plays on a playground. Frida attempts to talk to another girl, Irene, who keeps running away from her. Irene makes Frida 'it' in the group's game of tag. When Frida trips and scrapes her knee, Irene's mother panics and admonishes her daughter, saying she told her not to touch Frida. Marga carries Frida home and cleans the wound.

Frida's grandparents surprise the family with a visit. They tell Marga and Esteve that they want to begin visiting weekly, but Lola reminds them that the existing arrangement is what Frida's mother requested.

Another day, Anna repeatedly asks Frida to play. Eventually, Frida leads Anna out to the forest and tells her to wait for her to return. After Frida returns to the house, Marga asks her if she has seen Anna, and Frida says she hasn't. She goes to look for Anna herself where she told her to wait, but does not find her. Later that day, Marga carries Anna, who now wears a cast on her arm, into the house. Frida overhears Marga and Esteve arguing about her behavior.

On a day when the family is swimming at a pool, Esteve tells Frida that Marga is not feeling well, and Frida goes to her and checks whether she is breathing. Marga tells Frida that she has her period.

Another day, Marga and Frida share popsicles, and Marga tells Frida that the doctors' tests are done and she is healthy — just allergic to cats. When Anna asks about the family's cat, Esteve tells her that the cat has gone on a trip.

The family visits a watering hole, where Anna falls in the water and Esteve blames Frida. On another visit from the rest of the family, the girls' grandmother gifts Anna and Frida matching nightgowns, and Frida spills milk on hers because it is blue, while Anna's is pink. While washing the dress, Frida complains that she feels like a housemaid because she has to do so many chores. When the visit ends, Frida refuses to leave her grandparents' car, and Esteve has to carry her back to the house.

That night, Frida prepares to run away. When Anna asks where she is going, Frida says she is going home because no one loves her. Anna responds that she loves her. Frida leaves the house and watches from nearby as Marga and Esteve begin searching for her. She walks back to them and says she will leave the next day instead because it's too dark out at night.

Frida smiles as she carries the town flag in the Feast of Saint James procession. As Marga helps the girls prepare for the start of the school year, Frida asks Marga how her mother died. Marga says that a virus killed her. She says the doctors did their best, but that the virus is very new and her mother's body could not fight it anymore. Marga continues to answer Frida's questions about her mother's death. Finally, Frida asks if Marga will get sick, and Marga replies that she won't.

The night before school starts, Esteve, Anna, and Frida are playing on the bed when Frida begins to sob. The family surrounds Frida as she cries.

== Inspiration ==
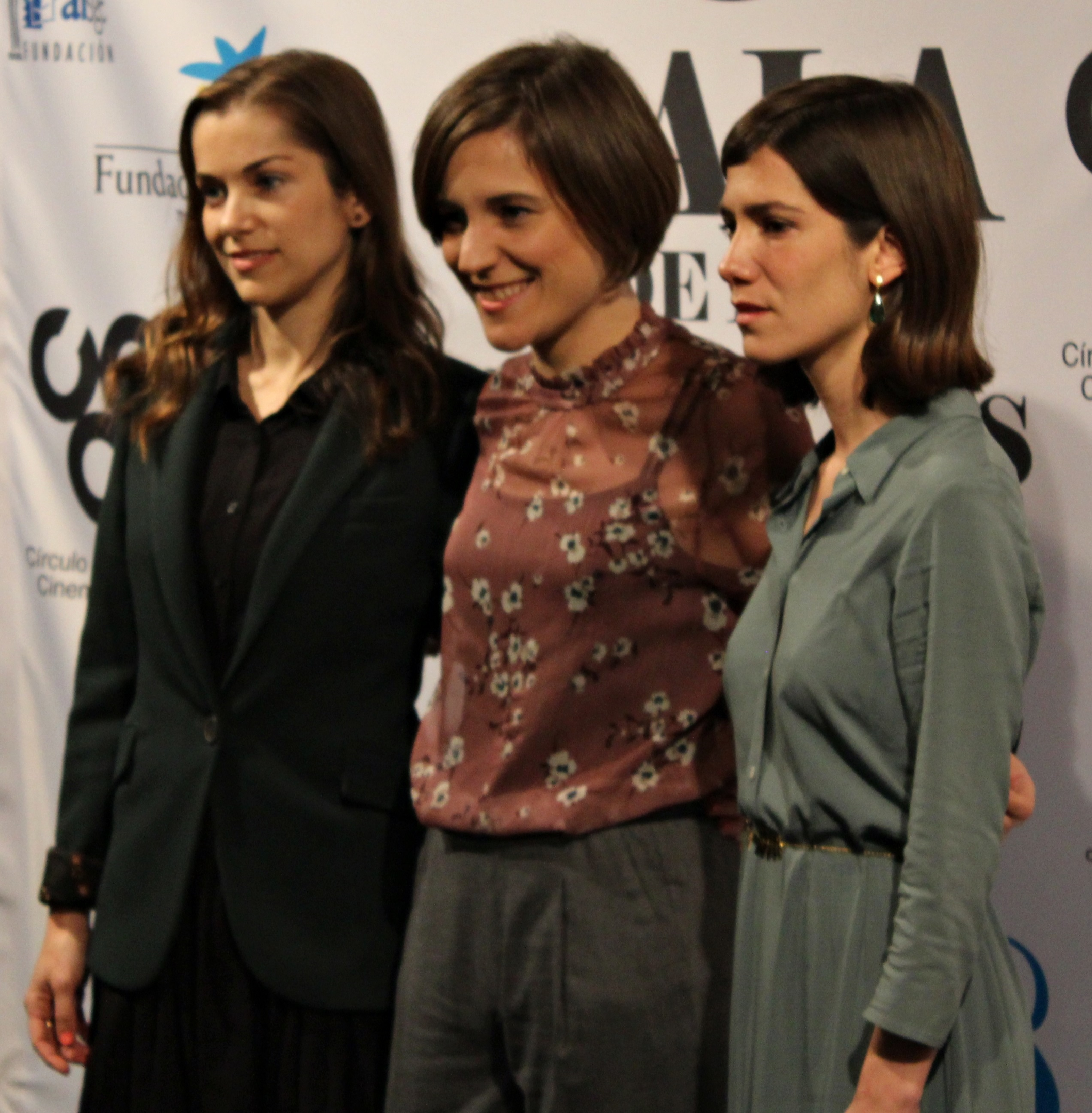
María Zamora, Carla Simón, and Bruna Cusí

In an article by Academia. La Revista del Cine Español, Simón explains that she was inspired to make the film by her own experiences as a child. When Simón was six years old, her mother died as a result of AIDS, and she moved in with her aunt, uncle, and cousin on her mother's side of the family. Simón explains that the movie has helped her to come to terms with her past, and she hopes that the same may be true for audience members who watch the film. In fact, many of the scenes were shot in the same town in which Simón grew up with her aunt, uncle, and cousin.

In an interview with Inside Cinema, Simón explains that many of the scenes in the film were based on pictures of her childhood. Several of these scenes include Frida and Anna climbing the tree, Frida and Anna in the bathtub, Frida painting her face with makeup, Frida and Anna washing their dresses, and Marga, Esteve, Frida, and Anna in the bed together. Certain set locations were also based on Simón's childhood home, such as the pool bar and the forest. In an interview with Variety, Simón explains that she wanted to follow the spontaneity of the young actors with her filming, opting for longer shots whenever possible.

== Production ==
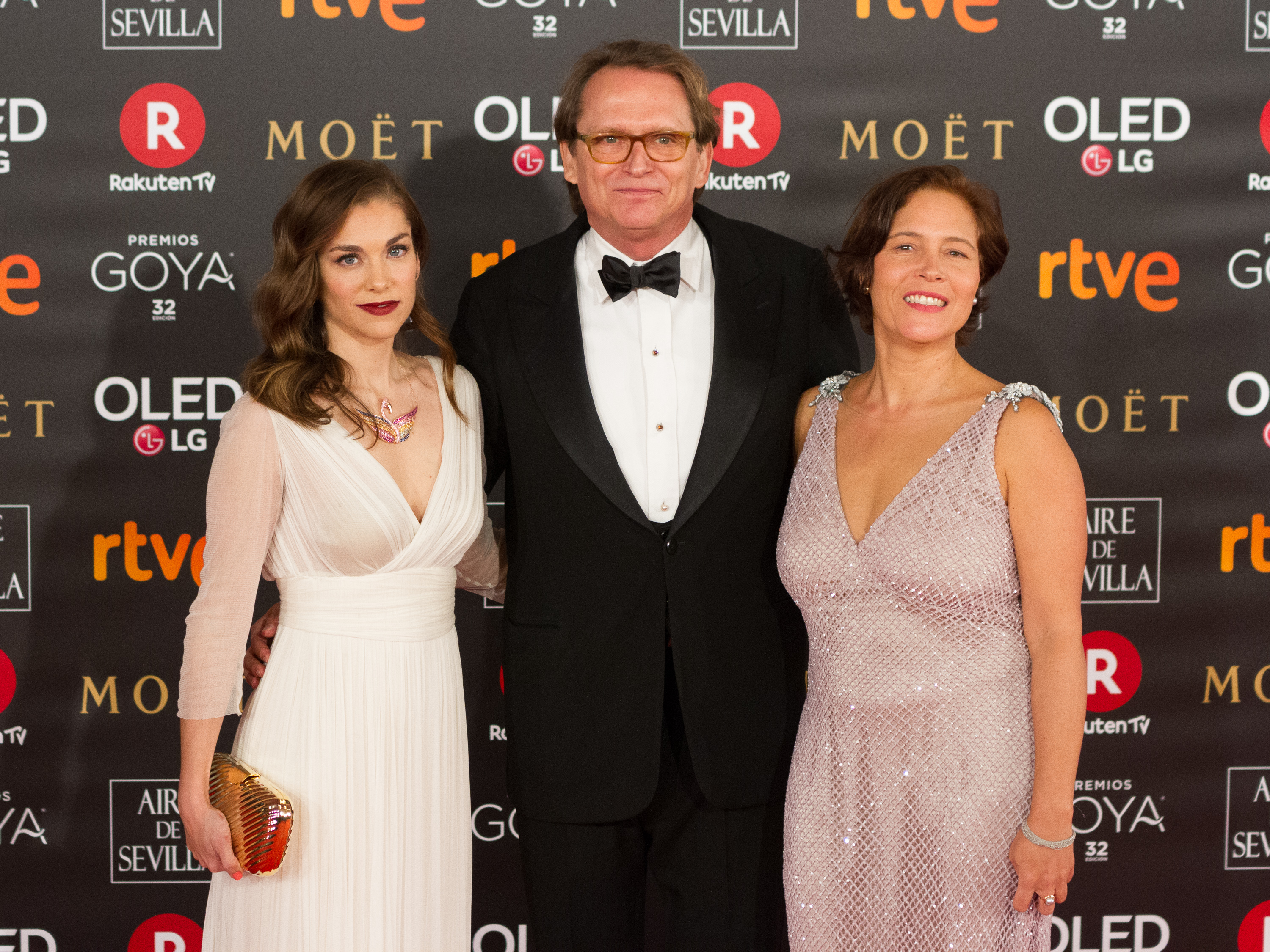
Summer 1993 producers María Zamora, Stefan Schmitz, and Valerie Delpierre at the 2018 Premios Goya

The companies that produced Summer 1993 were Inicia Films and Avalon. The film was produced by Valérie Delpierre and co-produced by María Zamora and Stefan Schmitz. Its executive producers were Delpierre and Zamora. Summer 1993 was written and directed by Carla Simón and edited by Ana Pfaff and Dídac Palou. The camerawork was done by Santiago Racaj. On opening night, the film made $21,307. In the All-Time Domestic Box Office ranking, the film is ranked 11,528th with $185,903 in revenue (not adjusted for inflation). Internationally, the film made $2,565,941 in total as of April 20, 2023.

== Reception ==
=== Critical response ===
Summer 1993 has an approval rating of 100% on review aggregator website Rotten Tomatoes, based on 93 reviews, and an average rating of 8.1/10. The website's critical consensus states: "Summer 1993 (Estiu 1993) finds writer-director Carla Simón drawing on personal memories to create a thoughtful drama elevated by outstanding work from its young leads. Metacritic assigned the film a weighted average score of 81 out of 100, based on 19 critics, indicating "universal acclaim".

On the film review website RogerEbert.com, Odie Henderson gives the film three stars out of four. He explains how, since Frida's perspective remains enveloped in her childhood experiences throughout the film, it is the job of the viewer to parse out important details that Frida doesn't understand. Henderson notes that the film uses the motif of blood to allude to the cause of Frida's parents' deaths (illness linked to AIDS), since the adults in the film never explain the cause to Frida directly. Surrounding the deaths, Henderson highlights, is a deep feeling of shame for the characters who are old enough to understand the implications.

Peter Bradshaw of The Guardian gives Summer 1993 five stars, titling his review "stunning drama of a childhood ripped apart." Bradshaw calls the film "subtle" and "rich" and praises Simón's ability to create meaning through the numerous scenes of Frida and Anna playing. He also notes the strength of the performances of Laia Artigas (Frida) and Paula Robles (Anna), explaining that acting at that age is different from what it is as an adult. For these actresses, Bradshaw suggests, the action of the film "is real." In addition, Summer 1993 is listed as a NYT Critic's Pick. Jeannette Catsoulis of The New York Times notes the emotions that are communicated through the film, culminating in what she describes as "gentle catharsis."

=== Awards and nominations ===
Year	Film Festival	Award	Nominee(s)	Result	Ref.
2017	Berlin International Film Festival	Best First Feature	Summer 1993	Won	
2017	Berlin International Film Festival	Grand Prix of the Generation Kplus International Jury	Summer 1993	Won	
2017	Buenos Aires International Festival of Independent Cinema	Best Director - International Competition	Carla Simón	Won	
2017	European Film Awards	European Discovery 2017 - Prix FIPRESCI	Summer 1993	Nominated	
2017	Málaga Film Festival	Golden Biznaga	Summer 1993	Won	
2018	Goya Awards	Best Supporting Actor	David Verdaguer	Won	
2018	Goya Awards	Best New Director	Carla Simón	Won	
2018	Goya Awards	Best New Actress	Bruna Cusì	Won	
2018	Gaudì Awards	Best Film	Summer 1993	Won	
2018	Gaudì Awards	Best Direction	Carla Simón	Won	
2018	Gaudì Awards	Best Screenplay	Carla Simón	Won	
2018	Gaudì Awards	Best Supporting Actress	Bruna Cusí	Won	
2018	Gaudì Awards	Best Editing	Anna Pfaff, Didac Palou	Won	
2018	Feroz Awards	Best Drama	Summer 1993 - Carla Simón	Won	
2018	Feroz Awards	Best Director	Carla Simón	Won	
2018	Feroz Awards	Best Supporting Actor	David Verdaguer	Won	
2018	Feroz Awards	Best Screenplay	Carla Simón	Won	
2018	Academy Awards	Best Foreign Language Film	Summer 1993	Spain's Selection (Note: not nominated in the end)	

== See also ==
- List of submissions to the 90th Academy Awards for Best Foreign Language Film
- List of Spanish submissions for the Academy Award for Best Foreign Language Film
