= 10,000 km =

- Theatrical release poster
- Directed by: Carlos Marques-Marcet
- Written by: Carlos Marques-Marcet; Clara Roquet
- Produced by: Tono Folguera; Sergio Moreno; Jana Diaz-Juhl
- Starring: Natalia Tena; David Verdaguer
- Cinematography: Dagmar Weaver-Madsen
- Edited by: Juliana Montañés
- Production companies: Lastor Media; La Panda; Televisión Española; TVC
- Distributed by: Avalon
- Release dates: March 10, 2014 (SXSW); May 16, 2014 (Spain)
- Running time: 99 minutes
- Country: Spain
- Languages: Spanish; Catalan; English

10,000 km is a 2014 Spanish romantic drama film directed by Carlos Marqués-Marcet. The film stars Natalia Tena and David Verdaguer as a couple trying to make their relationship work, while one lives in Barcelona and the other in Los Angeles.

The film had its world premiere on March 10, 2014, at the SXSW film festival and received the Special Jury Recognition for Best Acting Duo. The film was released on May 16, 2014, in Spain and on July 10, 2015, in a limited release and through video on demand by Broad Green Pictures in the United States.

== Plot ==
10,000 km follows the relationship between Alexandra and Sergi in Barcelona, Spain. They struggle to find a balance between their plans of having a baby and Alex's photography career. When Alex accepts a one-year residency in Los Angeles, their distance apart tests the bounds of their relationship. They attempt to use modern technology to keep their relationship strong, but the physical distance proves more challenging than they could have imagined.

== Cast ==
- Natalia Tena as Alex
- David Verdaguer as Sergi

== Release ==
The film had its world premiere at the SXSW film festival on March 10, 2014. The film also screened at the AFI festival on November 7, 2014. The film was acquired by Broad Green Pictures for U.S. domestic distribution. The film was released in a limited release and through video on demand on July 10, 2015.

== Reception ==
=== Critical response ===
10,000 km has an approval rating of 85% on review aggregator website Rotten Tomatoes, based on 27 reviews, and an average rating of 7.3/10. Metacritic assigned the film a weighted average score of 75 out of 100, based on 12 critics, indicating "generally favorable reviews".

=== Awards ===
Awards	Category	Nominated	Result
2014 AFI Film Festival	American Independents Audience Award		Won
27th European Film Awards	Discovery of the Year		Nominated
2nd Feroz Awards	Best Drama Film		Nominated
2nd Feroz Awards	Best Director	Carlos Marqués-Marcet	Nominated
2nd Feroz Awards	Best Main Actor in a Film	David Verdaguer	Nominated
2nd Feroz Awards	Best Main Actress in a Film	Natalia Tena	Nominated
2nd Feroz Awards	Best Screenplay	Carlos Marqués-Marcet and Clara Roquet	Nominated
2nd Feroz Awards	Best Trailer		Nominated
70th CEC Awards	Best New Director	Carlos Marques-Marcet	Nominated
70th CEC Awards	Best New Actor	David Verdaguer	Nominated
70th CEC Awards	Best New Actress	Natalia Tena	Nominated
2014 SXSW Film Festival	Special Jury Recognition for Best Acting Duo	Natalia Tena and David Verdaguer	Nominated
29th Goya Awards	Best New Actor	David Verdaguer	Nominated
29th Goya Awards	Best New Actress	Natalia Tena	Nominated
29th Goya Awards	Best New Director	Carlos Marqués-Marcet	Won
2014 Málaga Film Festival	Golden Biznaga for Best Film		Won
2014 Málaga Film Festival	Critics Award		Won
2014 Málaga Film Festival	Best Director	Carlos Marqués-Marcet	Won
2014 Málaga Film Festival	Best Actress	Natalia Tena	Won
2014 Málaga Film Festival	Best First Screenplay	Carlos Marqués-Marcet and Clara Roquet	Won
