= Carlos Marqués-Marcet =

Catalan film director, screenwriter

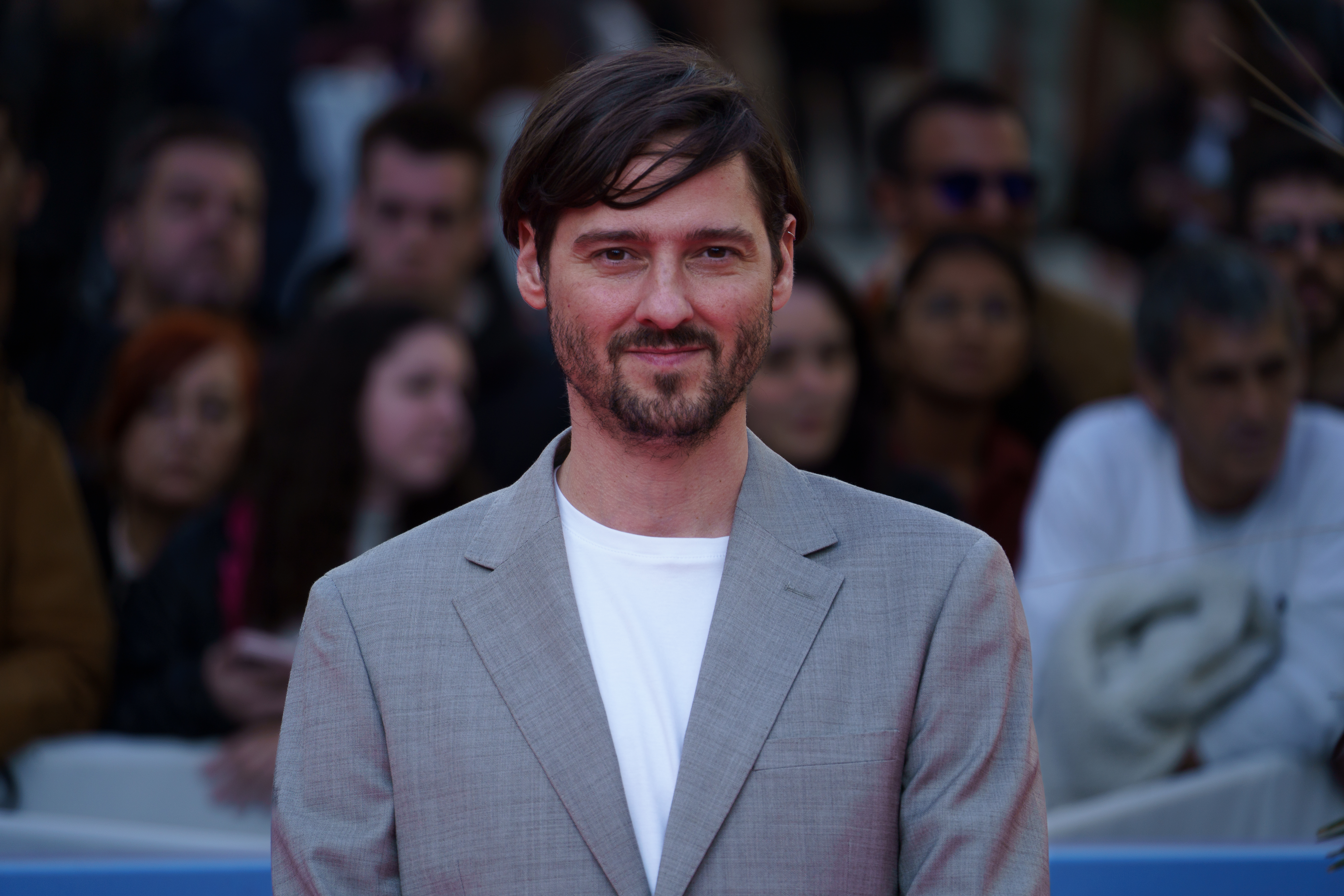
- Marqués-Marcet in 2025
- Born: 1983 (age 42–43); Barcelona, Spain
- Education: Pompeu Fabra University
- Occupations: Film director; screenwriter; film editor
- Years active: 2006–present
- Notable work: 10,000 km; Anchor and Hope; En el corredor de la muerte

Carlos Marqués-Marcet (born 1983) is a Spanish film director, screenwriter and film editor best known for his first fictional film 10,000 km.

== Biography ==
Born in Barcelona, Carlos Marqués-Marcet studied Audiovisual Communication at Universitat Pompeu Fabra, in Barcelona, where he had his degree in 2006. His fourth short film Udols was awarded as the best short film of the year 2008 by Cahiers du Cinéma.

In 2008 he flew to Los Angeles (California) to attend a master in Film Direction at the University of California, Los Angeles (UCLA).

His first fictional film was 10,000 km, made in Barcelona in 2014. This film won a lot of awards in some film festivals, as Málaga Film Festival, Goya Awards (best new director) or Gaudí Awards (best director), among others.

== Filmography ==
=== Short films ===
- Amunt i avall (2006, "Up and down")
- Fora de joc (2007, "Offsides")
- Udols (2008, "Howls")
- I'll be alone (2010)
- 5456 Miles away (2010)
- Say goodnight (2011)
- The yellow ribbon (2012)
- Mateix lloc, mateixa hora (2012, "Same place, same hour")

=== Non fiction ===
- De pizarros y atahualpas (2009, "About Pizarros and Atahualpas")
- El día que la conocimos (2012, "The day we met her")

=== Films ===
- 10,000 km (2014)
- 13 dies d'octubre (2015, "13 days of October")
- Terra ferma / Tierra firme (2017, "Anchor and Hope")
- Els dies que vindran (2019, "The Days to Come")
- La mort de Guillem (2020, "The death of Guillem")
- Polvo serán (2024, "They Will Be Dust")

== Awards and nominations ==
Year	Award	Category	Work	Result	Ref.
2006	Premio Nacional de Jóvenes Creadores		"Amunt i avall"	Won	
2014	Bisnaga de Oro	Best film in Málaga Film Festival	"10,000 km"	Won	
2014	Bisnaga de Plata	Best direction in Málaga Film Festival	"10,000 km"	Won	
2014	Best New Screenwriter in Málaga Film Festival		"10,000 km"	Won	
2014	Award of Film criticism Málaga Film Festival		"10,000 km"	Won	
2015	Gaudí Awards	Best Film in non-Catalan Language	"10,000 km"	Won	
2015	Gaudí Awards	Best Direction	"10,000 km"	Won	
2015	Gaudí Awards	Best Script	"10,000 km"	Won	
2015	Gaudí Awards	Best Film Edition	"10,000 km"	Nominated	
2015	Fassbinder Award	Best Revelation Film	"10,000 km"	Nominated	
2015	Goya Awards	Best New Director	"10,000 km"	Won	
2019	Bisnaga de Oro	Best film in Málaga Film Festival	"Los días que vendran"	Won	
2019	Bisnaga de Plata	Best direction in Málaga Film Festival	"Los días que vendran"	Won	
2020	Gaudí Awards	Best Film	"Los días que vendran"	Won	
2021	Gaudí Awards	Best Film for Television	"La mort de Guillem"	Won	
