= Church of Saint Mary of Eunate =

Catholic parish church in Spain

Coordinates: 42°40′N 1°45′W

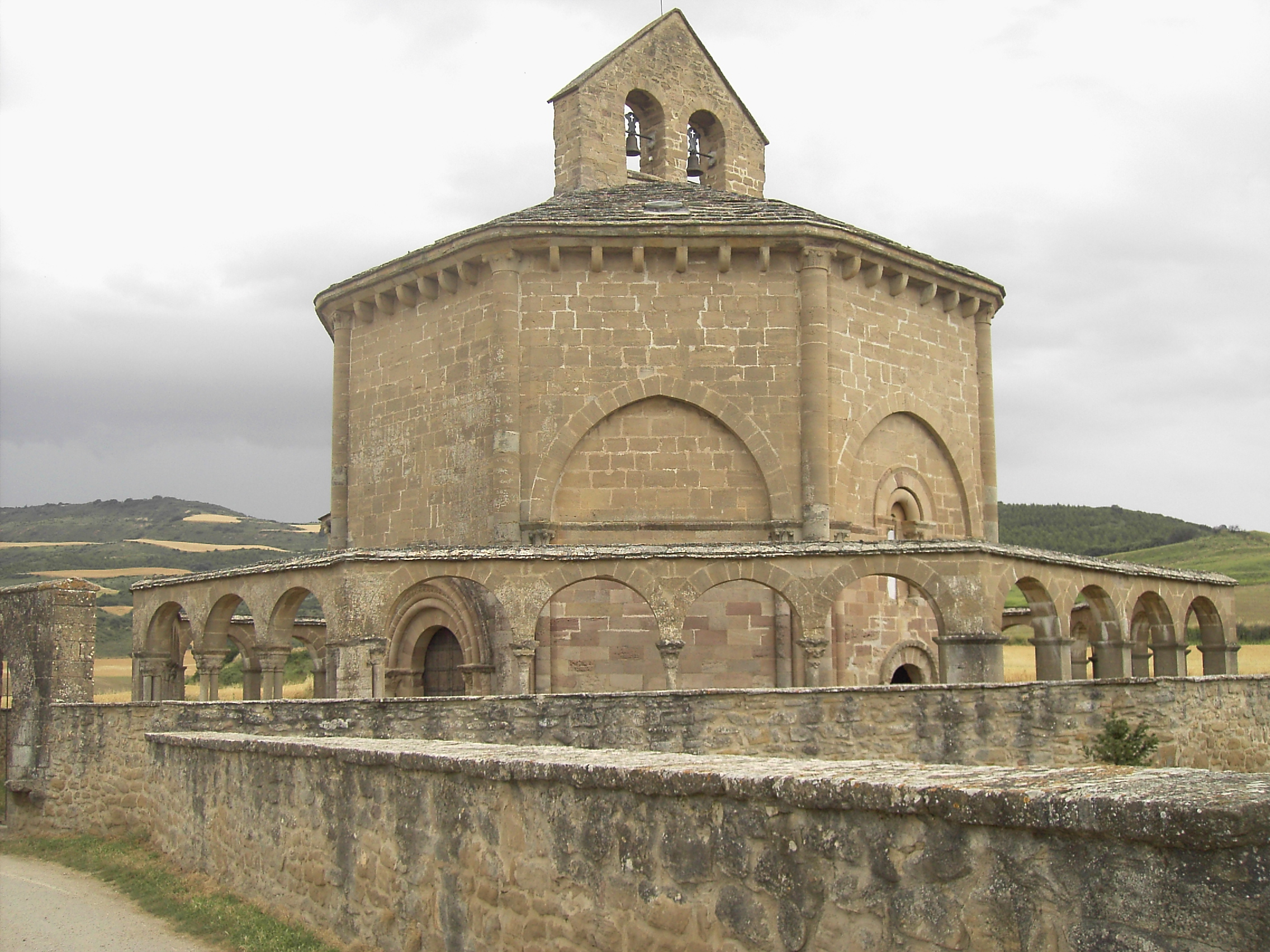
Santa María de Eunate

The Church of Saint Mary of Eunate is a 12th-century Catholic church of Romanesque construction located about 2 km south-east of Muruzábal, Navarre, Spain, on the Way of Saint James. Its origins are disputed due to lack of documentation. Its octagonal plan and the fact that it is not located in a present-day village or town but in the countryside contribute to its enigmatic nature. It is a site on the French Way path of the Camino de Santiago.

The church is built of dressed stone and its plan is a slightly irregular octagon with a little three-side apse. It presents the typical architectural features of the European Romanesque art (dressed-stone masonry, robust walls, semicircular arches, little windows made of alabaster, etc.) as well as some other local Romanesque characteristics like the chessboard-shape decoration in Navarre and Aragon.

Its eight walls sustain an eight-rib vault, inspired in Cordova's caliphate art. This structure is very similar to the Church of the Holy Sepulchre of Torres del Río, Navarre, 55 km far from Eunate and also on the Way of Saint James. The whole building is surrounded by arches that seem to have been partially reconstructed more recent than the original construction of the church. They may have been built centuries later using rests of a hypothetical now disappeared cloister.

The church is a hermitage dedicated to the Virgin Mary and people from all of the Valdizarbe valley celebrate a traditional romería there. This function is the only unquestioned known use of the building as it is the only one that is documented. The early documented reference to Eunate dates from 1487 and refers to a sodality devoted to the Virgin of Eunate. Nevertheless, the characteristics of the building, its location on the Way of Saint James and the comparison with other coetaneous religious buildings demands further explanation about the origin of the church.

Since the late 19th century, there have been several theories about the original function and authorship of Eunate. Due to its octagonal plan, the first theories stated that Eunate was a Templar church, related to other central plan churches like the above-mentioned Holy Sepulchre of Torres del Río, and other undoubtedly Templar buildings like the Templar convent of Tomar, the Temple Church of London or the Holy Sepulchre of Pisa; all of them inspired by the Church of the Holy Sepulchre of Jerusalem. This alleged Templar origin and the aura of mystery that surrounds the church have contributed to esoteric interpretations. While the presence of Knights Templar in this zone of Navarre is not documented, the importance of another military order, the Order of Saint John of Jerusalem or Knights Hospitaller, that could have operated a hospital ('hostel') for pilgrims to Santiago, is well known. Archaeological excavations have found many burials and the typical St. James' shells.

== See also ==
- High medieval domes

== Bibliography ==
- Fernández-Ladreda, Clara; Martínez de Aguirre, Javier; Martínez Álava, Carlos J.: El arte románico en Navarra, Pamplona: Gobierno de Navarra, 2002
- García-Gaínza, Concepción (dir.): Catálogo monumental de Navarra, Pamplona: Institución Príncipe de Viana, 1996, vol. V-2, pp. 325–337.
- Sutter, Heribert: Form und Ikonologie spanischer Zentralbauten: Torres del Rio, Segovia, Eunate, Weimar: VDG, 1997
