= The Good Luck =

- Theatrical release poster
- Spanish: La buena suerte
- Directed by: Gracia Querejeta
- Screenplay by: María Ruiz; Gracia Querejeta
- Based on: La buena suerte by Rosa Montero
- Produced by: Gerardo Herrero; Mariela Besuievsky
- Starring: Megan Montaner; Hugo Silva; Miguel Rellán; Eva Ugarte; Ismael Martínez; Álvaro Rico
- Cinematography: Juan Carlos Gómez
- Edited by: Leire Alonso
- Music by: Vanessa Garde
- Production companies: Tornasol Media; Arlas AIE; Trianera AIE
- Distributed by: Karma Films
- Release dates: 16 March 2025 (Málaga); 6 June 2025 (Spain)
- Country: Spain
- Language: Spanish

The Good Luck (Spanish: La buena suerte) is a 2025 Spanish drama film directed by Gracia Querejeta from a screenplay by Querejeta and María Ruiz based on the novel by Rosa Montero. It stars Hugo Silva and Megan Montaner.

== Plot ==
Fleeing from something, architect Pablo gets off the train on the village (and former bituminous coal mining site) of Pozonegro, coming across colourful characters such as Raluca, who also keeps a secret.

== Cast ==
- Hugo Silva as Pablo
- Megan Montaner as Raluca
- Miguel Rellán as Felipe
- Eva Ugarte as Regina
- Ismael Martínez as Urraca
- Paqui Horcajo
- Álvaro Rico
- Chani Martín as Collado
- Josean Bengoetxea as Andueza
- Daniel Vitallé as Marcos
- Bianca Kovacs

== Production ==
Based on the novel La buena suerte by Rosa Montero, the screenplay was written by Gracia Querejeta in tandem with María Ruiz. The film is a Tornasol Media, Arlas PC AIE and Trianera PC AIE production, with the participation of RTVE and Movistar Plus+, subsidised by the Government of Navarre and with backing from ICAA and ICO.

Filming locations in Navarre included Abárzuza, Oteiza, Muruzábal, Obanos, Pamplona. Additional footage was shot in La Rioja and Madrid.

== Release ==
The film was presented at the 28th Málaga Film Festival on 16 March 2025, vying for the Golden Biznaga. Distributed by Karma Films, it is scheduled to be released theatrically in Spain on 6 June 2025. Latido Films acquired international sales rights.

== Reception ==
Javier Ocaña of El País considered that, while not being a perfect film by any means, The Good Luck triumphs in "the depth of the characters, their carnality and warmth".

== See also ==
- List of Spanish films of 2025
