= Francisco Ortiz (actor) =

Spanish actor (born 1986)

- Born: 10 June 1986 (age 40); Madrid, Spain
- Years active: 2011–present
- Partner: Carlota Baró

Francisco Ortiz (born 10 June 1986) is a Spanish actor.

== Career ==
Ortiz was born in Madrid on 10 June 1986 and studied acting at RESAD, a drama school in the city. He began his career around 2011 in underground cinema and theatre, where he played the role of numerous characters in works related to playwright Lope de Vega. In May 2014, Ortiz had a breakthrough role in television when he joined the series El secreto de Puente Viejo.

He has worked with renowned Spanish figures like Eva Ugarte, Fernando Guillén Cuervo, Verónica Sánchez, and Natalia Verbeke. Others of his television works include El Caso. Crónica de sucesos and the soap opera Amar es para siempre. More recent roles for Ortiz include El Cid, ¡García!, ¿A qué estás esperando?, and Memento mori.

In 2024, Ortiz had his breakthrough role in high-stakes cinema by portraying the lead character in the Spanish zombie film Apocalypse Z: The Beginning of the End directed by Carles Torrens.

== Personal life ==
Ortiz is in a relationship with Carlota Baró, a Spanish actress, who has appeared with him in numerous productions.

== Selected roles ==
=== Television ===
Year	Title	Role	Notes
2014–2015	El secreto de Puente Viejo	Bosco Ulloa	Soap opera
2016	El Caso. Crónica de sucesos	Comisario Montenegro	TV series
2017	Conquistadores: Adventvm	Hernando de Soto	Historical drama miniseries
2018–2019	Amar es para siempre	Carlos	
2020–2021	El Cid	Sancho	
2022	¡García!	García	
2024	¿A qué estás esperando?	Daryl	
2023–2025	Memento mori	Sancho	

=== Film ===
Year	Title	Role	Notes
2024	Apocalypse Z: The Beginning of the End	Manel	Zombie film by Carles Torrens
