= Memento mori (TV series) =

2023 Iberian crime thriller TV series

- Promotional release poster
- Based on: Memento mori by César Pérez Gellida
- Written by: Germán Aparicio; Abraham Sastre; Luis Arranz
- Directed by: Marco A. Castillo; Fran Parra
- Starring: Yon González; Francisco Ortiz; Manuela Vellés; Olivia Baglivi; Juan Echanove
- Countries of origin: Spain; Portugal
- Original language: Spanish
- No. of seasons: 3
- No. of episodes: 15

Production
- Executive producers: Jose Velasco; Sara Fernández-Velasco; Luis Arranz; Marco A. Castillo; Ibón Celaya
- Production company: Zebra Producciones

Original release
- Network: Amazon Prime Video
- Release: 27 October 2023 – 1 August 2025

Memento mori is a crime thriller television series starring Yon González and Francisco Ortiz. The first season premiered on Amazon Prime Video on 27 October 2023. In March 2025, ahead of the second season premiere, the series was renewed for a third and final season. The second season premiered on 25 April 2025. The third and final season was released on 1 August 2025.

== Plot ==
The plot follows Ramiro Sancho, a police inspector tracking down a narcissistic psychopathic serial killer in Valladolid. To that end, he enjoys the help of psycholinguist Martina Corvo and criminal psychologist Carapocha.

== Cast ==
- Yon González as Augusto Ledesma
- Francisco Ortiz as Ramiro Sancho
- Olivia Baglivi as Violeta / Erika Lopategui
- Juan Echanove as Armando Lopategui "Carapocha"
- Manuela Vellés as Martina Corvo
- Fernando Soto as subinspector Matesanz
- Carlota Baró as subinspectora Carmen
- Javier Varela as subinspector Peteira
- Juanma Lara as inspector Bragado
- Rodrigo Poisón as forense Villamil
- Juan Fernández as comisario Mejía

Introduced in season 2

- Anna Favella as Gracia Galo

== Production ==
Based on Memento mori, the first installment of the book trilogy Versos, canciones y trocitos de carne by César Pérez Gellida, season one was written by Germán Aparicio, Abraham Sastre and Luis Arranz. The episodes were directed by Marco A. Castillo and Fran Parra while Jose Velasco, Sara Fernández-Velasco, Luis Arranz, Marco A. Castillo and Ibón Celaya served as executive producers. Shooting locations included Valladolid.

== Release ==
The first two episodes received a pre-screening at the 68th Valladolid International Film Festival in October 2023. Amazon Prime Video released the series on 27 October 2023 in Spain and Portugal. In April 2024, the series was renewed for a second season, adapting César Pérez Gellida's novel Dies irae.

== Accolades ==
Year	Award	Category	Nominee(s)	Result	Ref.
2024	32nd Actors and Actresses Union Awards	Best Television Actor in a Leading Role	Yon González	Nominated	

== See also ==
- 2023 in Spanish television
