= Martiño Rivas =

Spanish film, television, and stage actor

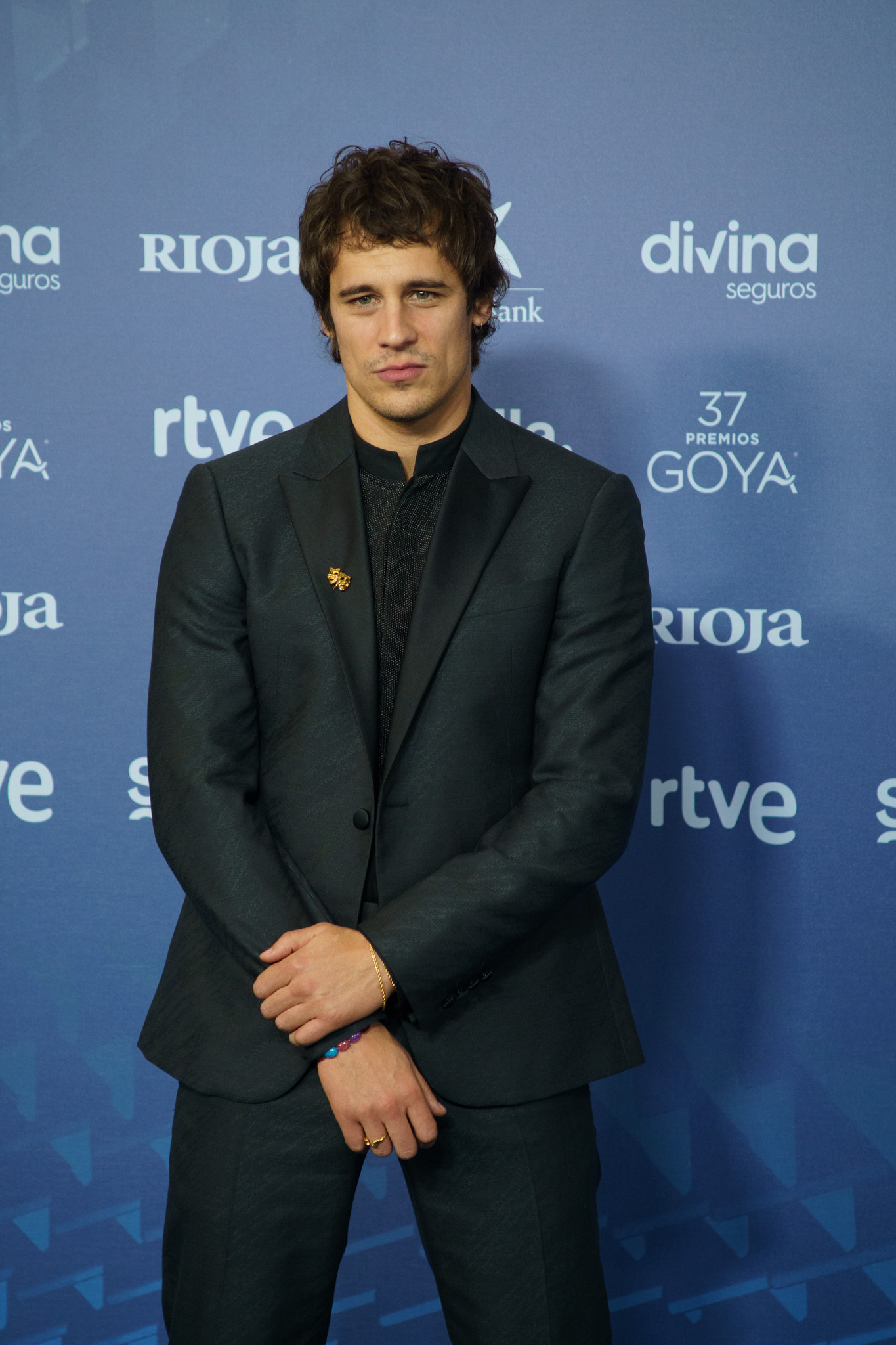
- Attending the 37th Goya Awards
- Born: Martiño Rivas López; 10 January 1985 (age 41); Vimianzo, Galicia, Spain
- Other name: Martín Rivas
- Education: University of Santiago de Compostela; Royal Central School of Speech and Drama
- Occupation: Actor
- Years active: 1998–present
- Parents: Manuel Rivas; María Isabel López Mariño

Martiño Rivas López (born 10 January 1985), also known as Martín Rivas, is a Spanish actor. He is best known for his performance as Marcos Novoa Pazos in the Antena 3 series The Boarding School (Spanish: El internado) and for his role in The Blind Sunflowers (Los girasoles ciegos), which earned him a nomination for the Goya Award for Best New Actor. From 2017 to 2020, he starred in the Netflix original series Las Chicas del Cable as Carlos Cifuentes.

== Early life and education ==
Rivas was born Martiño Rivas López on 10 January 1985 in Vimianzo, A Coruña, Galicia, Spain. He is the only son of Manuel Rivas, a writer and journalist, and María Isabel López Mariño. Rivas graduated from high school in London, and subsequently studied audiovisual communications at the University of Santiago de Compostela. He is fluent in Spanish, Galician and English. Rivas was criticized for speaking Spanish with a Galician accent.

== Acting career ==
Rivas began his career as a child actor in 1998 with the TVG series Mareas vivas (English: Live Tides), made in the Galician language. In 2005, he appeared in another Galician–language series, Maridos e mulleres (Husbands And Wives), also produced by TVG.

Rivas came to wider media attention in 2006, when he landed the role of Moisés in the LaSexta series SMS, opposite Yon González, Amaia Salamanca, Mario Casas, and others. From 2007 to 2010, Rivas portrayed Marcos Novoa Pazos in the Antena 3 series El internado (The Boarding School), which brought him international popularity.

Rivas made his feature film debut in José Luis Cuerda's The Blind Sunflowers (2008), opposite Javier Cámara and Maribel Verdú, which earned him a nomination for the Goya Award for Best New Actor. The following year, he appeared in the short film Universos (Universes) along with his El internado fellow Blanca Suárez.

From 2010 to 2011, Rivas trained at the Royal Central School of Speech and Drama in London, graduating with a Masters in Classical Acting. In 2011, Rivas made his professional stage debut in Dracula, in which he portrayed Jonathan Harker. He also stars in the television series El don de Alba (Alba's Gift) on Telecinco.

He has a major, continuing role in Las Chicas del Cable as Carlos Cifuentes; its first season premiered on Netflix in April 2017. Its fifth season is to premier in 2020.

== Other work ==
In 2007, along with Yon González and Marta Torné, Rivas supported the ONG Childhood Without Limits Foundation.

In 2010, Rivas became ambassador for Spanish fashion designer Purificación García. He made his first campaign for the 2010 Spring/Summer collection with Ángela Molina. The same year, he also posed for the famous calendar Larios de la Moda.

== Filmography ==
Title	Translated Title	Year	Role	Notes
Mareas vivas	Live Tides	1998	Dani	TV series; 1998–99
Puzzle	Puzzle	2004	Boy	Short film
Maridos e mulleres	Husbands And Wives	2005	David	TV series
SMS: Sin miedo a soñar	SMS: Dreaming Without Fear	2006	Moisés	TV series; 2006–07
El internado	The Boarding School	2007	Marcos Novoa Pazos	TV series; 2007–10
Los girasoles ciegos	The Blind Sunflowers	2008	Lalo	
Universos	Universes	2009	Álex	Short film
El don de Alba	Alba's Gift	2013	Pablo Escudero	TV series
Tres bodas de más	Three Many Weddings	2013	Dani	Feature film
Por un puñado de besos		2014	Dani	
	Romeo & Juliet	2014	Romeo	TV Mini-Series
Las Chicas Del Cable	Cable Girls	2017	Carlos	TV series
Sé quién eres	I Know Who You Are	2017	Marc Castro	TV series
Nacho		2023	Nacho Vidal	TV series
Serpientes & Escaleras		2025	Vicente	TV series
Ella, maldita alma	She, damed soul	2025-2026	Issac	TV series
El problema final	The Final Problem	2026	Francisco Foxá	TV miniseries
Rocio	Rocio	2026	Pedro Carrasco	Tv Miniseries
La Vida Barcelona	La Vida Baecelona	2027	Alexis	Tv series

== Stage credits ==
Title	Translated Title	Year	Role	Notes
Drácula	Dracula	2011	Jonathan Harker	Production of

== Awards and nominations ==
Award	Year	Category	Nominated work	Result
EP3 Awards	2008	Best New Actor	The Blind Sunflowers	Won
Goya Awards	2008	Best New Actor	The Blind Sunflowers	Nominated
Islantilla Film Festival Awards	2009	Best New Actor	The Boarding School	Won
New Talent of Spanish Cinema Awards	2008	Best New Talent	The Blind Sunflowers; The Boarding School	Nominated
Vieira de Plata Awards	2008	Best New Actor	The Boarding School	Won
