= Blanca Romero =

Spanish actress (born 1976)

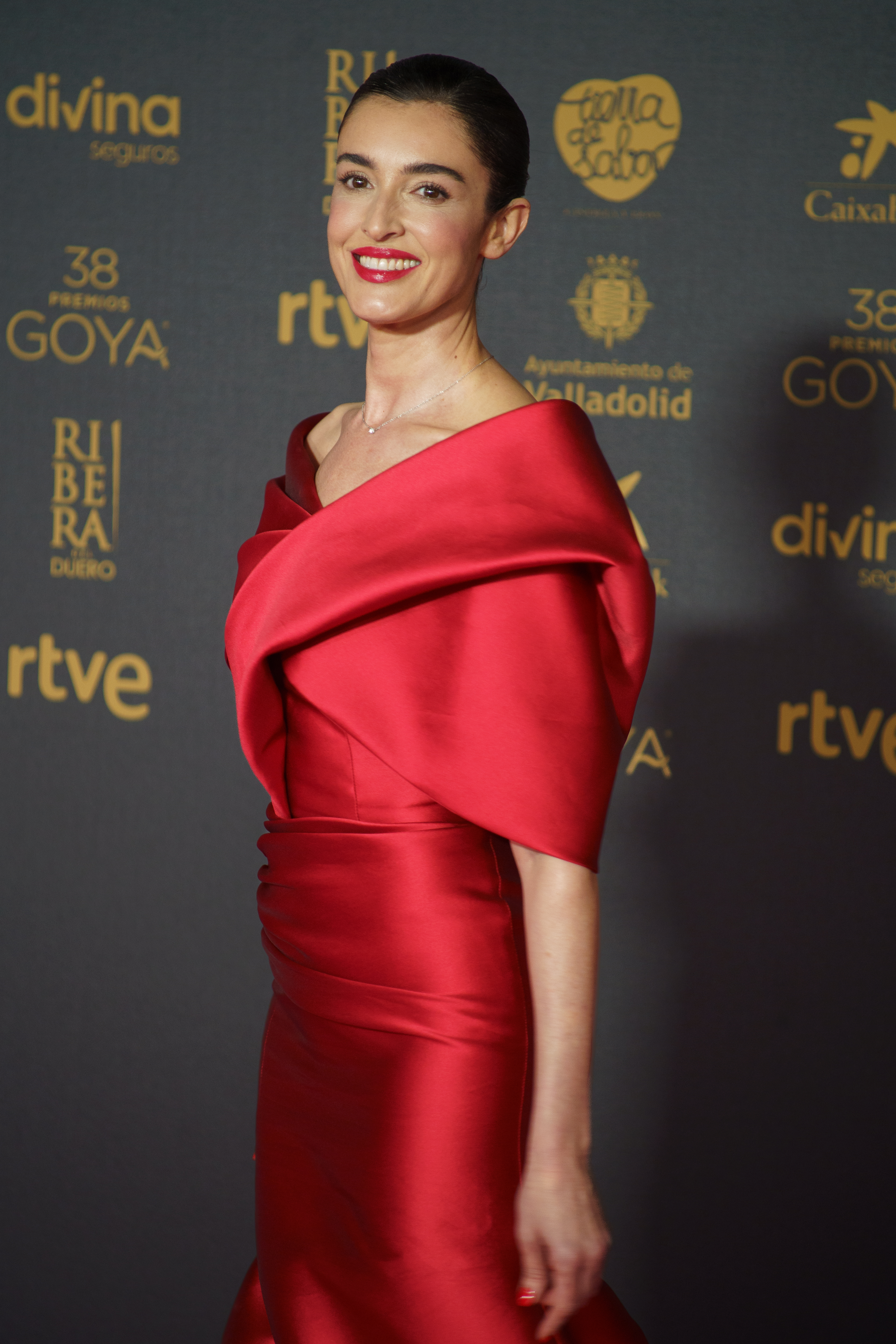
- Romero in 2024
- Born: Blanca Romero Ezama; 2 June 1976 (age 50); Gijón, Spain
- Occupations: Actress; Model; Singer
- Years active: 1990-present
- Height: 1.75 m (5 ft 9 in)
- Spouse: Cayetano Rivera Ordóñez (m. 2001; div. 2004)
- Partner: Quique Sánchez Flores (2025–present)
- Children: 2

Blanca Romero Ezama (born 2 June 1976) is a Spanish actress, model, and singer.

== Early life ==
Romero was born on 2 June 1976 in Gijón. Her great great grandmother was Peruvian and another great grand father was of Romani ethnicity.

== Career ==
At age 14, she appeared in her first fashion show at a boutique in Gijón. As a result, she became interested in the subject of fashion; at 17 she moved to Madrid, and two years later to Paris to work at fashion magazines such as Givenchy and Madame Figaro.

She composed her first song in 2001. In mid-2006, she began a short-lived musical career under the stage name La Perra.

She took part in some reports for the Antena 3 television program PuntoDoc. An appearance on El club de Flo on LaSexta led to her being noticed by the creative team for the teen drama series Física o Química, and she made the leap to acting. She went on to act in Las mañanas de Cuatro and Supermodelo 2006. She has appeared on the cover of the Spanish edition of Elle on several occasions, and posed nude in a special issue to raise awareness of water scarcity and pollution issues for Expo 2008 in Zaragoza.

She made her film debut in 2009 with After, for which she was nominated for Best New Actress at the 24th Goya Awards. She followed this with Los muertos no se tocan, nene in 2011 and The End in 2012.

In 2015, she starred in the first season of the Antena 3 series Bajo sospecha, playing an undercover police officer partnered with Yon González. After its renewal for a second season, it was published that Romero would not continue in the project, and would be replaced by Olivia Molina. A year later, it was announced that she had signed on for the miniseries La luz de la esperanza on La 1, alongside Isak Férriz, Natalia de Molina, and Pep Anton Muñoz.

In 2020, it was confirmed that she would reprise her role as Irene Calvo Azpeolea in Física o químicaː El reencuentro for the platform Atresplayer Premium.

== Personal life ==
On 11 September 1998, she gave birth to her first child, Lucia.

On 26 October 2001 she married the bullfighter Cayetano Rivera Ordóñez in the church of San Pedro in Gijón. Cayetano legally adopted Blanca's daughter. They divorced in 2004.

On 21 July 2012 she gave birth to her second child, a boy.

Since 2025, she has been in a relationship with football manager and former player Quique Sánchez Flores.

== Filmography ==
=== Television ===
Year	Title	Character	Channel	Notes
2008-2011	Física o Química	Irene Calvo Azpeolea	Antena 3	48 episodes
2012-2013	L'Isola	Tara Riva	Rai 1	12 episodes
2015	Bajo sospecha	Laura Cortés/Laura González Sarmiento	Antena 3	8 episodes
2017	La llum d'Elna	Maya	TV3	TV movie
2020-2021	Física o químicaː El reencuentro	Irene Calvo Azpeolea	Atresplayer Premium	2 episodes
2022-2023	Welcome to Eden	Roberta	Netflix	5 episodes
2025	Next Level Chef	Herself - Host	Telecinco	

=== Movies ===
Year	Title	Role	Notes	Ref.
2009	After	Ana		
2011	Los muertos no se tocan, nene	Clara		
2012	Fin (The End)	Cova		
2013	El amor no es lo que era	Paz		
2024	La abadesa (Holy Mother)	Eloísa		
