= Apocalypse Z: The Beginning of the End =

- Promotional release poster
- Spanish: Apocalipsis Z: El principio del fin
- Directed by: Carles Torrens
- Screenplay by: Ángel Agudo
- Based on: Apocalipsis Z 1. El principio del fin by Manel Loureiro
- Produced by: Adrián Guerra
- Starring: Francisco Ortiz
- Cinematography: Elías M. Félix
- Edited by: Luis de la Madrid
- Production company: Nostromo Pictures
- Distributed by: Amazon Prime Video
- Release dates: 5 October 2024 (Sitges); 31 October 2024 (Spain)
- Running time: 118 minutes
- Country: Spain
- Language: Spanish

Apocalypse Z: The Beginning of the End (Spanish: Apocalipsis Z: El principio del fin) is a 2024 Spanish zombie action thriller film directed by Carles Torrens from a screenplay by Ángel Agudo based on the novel by Manel Loureiro and starring Francisco Ortiz. Its plot deals with the protagonist's efforts to rejoin his family while the outbreak of a global pandemic begins to turn infected people into aggressive creatures.

== Plot ==
Six days after New Year's Eve, in Spain, Manel, a lawyer and owner of a solar power company, and his wife Julia visit his older sister Belén, her husband Mario, and his nephew Carlos. As they drive home that night, a discussion about Manel's unwillingness to have children of his own results in a car accident in which Julia is killed. One year passes, in which Manel lives in isolation with his cat Lúculo in his house in Galicia, maintaining only video contact with his sister and nephew. In his depression, he initially pays no attention to an ongoing outbreak of a dangerous virus called TSJ, which is rapidly spreading across Europe and resists quarantine measures. The Spanish government desperately tries to keep the population ignorant of how the virus turns infected people into highly aggressive zombies.

Belén's family is later evacuated to the Canary Islands; when Manel tries to join them, the government abruptly closes the borders, and soon after declares a general state of emergency. Manel promises Belén he'll stay home, despite the army's efforts to evacuate the population. While collecting supplies, he witnesses an infected man attacking and wounding two police officers. One kills the attacker, then himself, while the other also turns rabid. Manel then barricades himself in his house and hides when the army comes for him.

Two weeks later, Manel's supplies have dwindled, and communication lines have collapsed, leaving him unaware of his family's fate. While foraging in his neighborhood, he meets an elderly lady named Gabriela, who failed to join the evacuation because she is a wheelchair-user. With her help, he manages to gather a few scant supplies. That night, she informs him of a radio transmission summoning any survivors to the Arousa Estuary, for evacuation to the Canaries. Despite Gabriela's misgivings, Manel decides to bring them there with a boat he and Julia owned. But the next morning, as he prepares to fetch Gabriela, he discovers that she has committed suicide in order not to burden his escape.

Along with Lúculo, and equipped with a diving suit and a speargun for defense, Manel heads for the docks. Barely evading a zombie horde chasing after him, he finds all larger boats either gone or unusable. Using an inflatable dinghy, he sails for Pontevedra, but is intercepted by a group of ragged, armed Russian sailors led by their captain Ushakov. One of the crew, a former Ukrainian firefighting pilot named Viktor Pritchenko, informs Manel that the Canaries have been quarantined and enlists his help in searching the area for supplies. Just before going to sleep, Manel witnesses another group of refugees arriving and asking for help, but the next morning Pritchenko denies they ever arrived, and later Manel sees the crew rifling through the refugees' possessions.

No longer feeling safe, Manel tells Pritchenko about a helicopter at a hospital in Pontevedra, where his wife died, hoping Pritchenko will allow him to escape, but he cannot persuade him. Manel then tries to flee on his own, but is forced to detour through the bowels of the ship, where he finds two of the refugees imprisoned. While trying to free them, he is discovered by a guard, who shoots one of the prisoners. Pritchenko intervenes and kills the guard, and the three steal a motorboat to escape. As they depart, the remaining refugee is killed by the guards, and Pritchenko is wounded.

When Manel and Pritchenko make it to the hospital, they find the helicopter gone. Manel takes Pritchenko into the hospital to treat his injuries, but while searching the building, he finds a nurse named Lucia, a nun named Cecilia, and three children holed up inside. After treating Pritchenko, Lucia shows Manel another helicopter in a courtyard overrun by the zombies. Soon after, Ushakov's men arrive at the hospital looking for supplies. Forced to evacuate through a subterranean boiler complex, the group is attacked by a zombie; Cecilia is infected and remains behind. The rest make it to the helicopter and seal off the landing pad, but are intercepted by Ushakov and his men before they can take off. Manel cuts open the lock to the pad's fence, allowing the zombies to pour in and overwhelm Ushakov. Manel climbs aboard the departing helicopter, and the group escapes. As they near the Canaries, Manel manages to contact Belén. To their horror, Belén frantically warns them to stay away, and two fighter jets pass them.

== Cast ==
- Francisco Ortiz as Manel
- José María Yazpik as Pritchenko
- Berta Vázquez as Lucía
- Iria del Río as Julia
- Marta Poveda as Belén
- Amalia Gómez as Gabriela
- María Salgueiro as Sor Cecilia
- Yuri Mikhaylychenko as Ushakov
- Oriol Ruiz as Mario

== Production ==
The film is a Nostromo Pictures production, with Adrián Guerra as producer and Núria Valls as executive producer. Shooting locations in Vigo included the Zona Franca, the Port of Vigo, and Hospital Meixoeiro.

== Release ==
The film had its world premiere at the 57th Sitges Film Festival on 5 October 2024, ahead of its 31 October 2024 streaming debut on Amazon Prime Video.

== Critical reception ==
Bloody Disgusting said in its review, "Apocalypse Z doesn’t reinvent any wheels or even make any form of commentary about the zombie genre itself, but it’s still a surprisingly well-performed rendition of a classic song-and-dance. While the second half of the experience may be a little shaky and I wish the flick had the budget for larger zombie hordes, I can’t help but appreciate how everything here feels lovingly hand-crafted, which is why I’d recommend it to fans of classic zombie media."

== Sequel ==
In October 2026, Prime Video released the film Apocalipsis Z - Nuevo Mundo (Apocalypse Z: New World)

== See also ==
- List of Spanish films of 2024
