= Física o Química: El reencuentro =

Spanish television series

- Promotional poster
- Genre: Drama
- Based on: the characters created by Carlos Montero
- Written by: Carlos García Miranda
- Directed by: Juanma Pachón
- Starring: Andrea Duro; Angy Fernández; Maxi Iglesias; Leonor Martín; Gonzalo Ramos; Adam Jezierski; Adrián Rodríguez; Javier Calvo; Sandra Blázquez; Ana Milán; Blanca Romero; Marc Clotet; Andrés Cheung; José Lamuño; Álex Barahona
- Country of origin: Spain
- Original language: Spanish
- No. of seasons: 1
- No. of episodes: 2

Production
- Executive producers: Montse García; Sonia Martínez; David Troncoso
- Production companies: Atresmedia TV; Buendía Estudios

Original release
- Network: ATRESplayer Premium
- Release: 27 December 2020 – 3 January 2021

Related
- Física o Química

Física o Química: El reencuentro (also FoQ: El reencuentro) is a two-part Spanish streaming television miniseries that originally aired on Atresplayer Premium from 27 December 2020 to 3 January 2021. It is a sequel to the teen drama series Física o Química (2008–2011), focusing on the lives of the original characters a decade after as they meet up again for the wedding of Yoli.

== Synopsis ==
Nine years after the closure of the Zurbarán institute, a group of friends reunite at their friend Yoli's wedding. In the wedding's hotel venue, they reflect on their best and worst moments and discover old secrets.

== Cast ==
=== Protagonists ===
- Andrea Duro as Yolanda "Yoli" Freire Caballar
- Maxi Iglesias as César Cabano de Vera
- Gonzalo Ramos as Julio de la Torre Reig
- Leonor Martín as Covadonga "Cova" Ariste Espinel
- Angy Fernández as Paula Blasco Prieto
- Adam Jezierski as Gorka Martínez Mora
- Javier Calvo as Fernando "Fer" Redondo Ruano
- Adrián Rodríguez as David Ferrán Quintanilla
- Sandra Blázquez as Alma Núñez Fontevilla
- Andrés Cheung as Jan Taeming

=== Main cast ===
- Ana Milán as Olimpia Díaz Centeno
- Blanca Romero as Irene Calvo Azpeolea
- Marc Clotet as Vicente Vaquero Castiñeira
- José Lamuño as Oriol Puig
- Álex Barahona as Alberto "Berto" Freire Caballar

=== Participations ===
- Javier Ambrossi as himself
- Manuel Feijóo as Judge
- Despistaos as themselves

== Production and release ==
Física o Química: El reencuentro was produced by Atresmedia TV in collaboration with Buendía Estudios, with the participation of Boomerang TV. Writing duties were tasked to Carlos García Miranda, whereas the two episodes were directed by Juanma Pachón. Filming of the two episodes began on 7 September 2020 and had already wrapped by the end of the month.

Some notable characters from the original series who failed to made an onscreen appearance include Ruth (Úrsula Corberó) and Blanca (Cecilia Freire).

Atresplayer Premium released the first episode (titled "Cosas que hacer antes de casarse") on 27 December 2020. The closing episode (titled "Sí, puedes volver atrás") aired on 3 January 2021.

== Controversy ==
The series arrived on the platform with a great controversy since Carlos Montero, one of the creators of the original fiction, was not taken into account to take charge of this sequel. "The creator of the series has not been asked, total ... what will he have to say?", The writer wrote on his Twitter profile on 22 April 2020, after hearing the news that Antena 3's fiction was returning in the form of a special to the Atresmedia platform.

At the fiction presentation round, held on 17 December. 2020, Montse García, fiction director of Atresmedia TV, assured that Montero could not be in the project due to "exclusivity contract issues" with Netflix, a platform to which he joined after the success of another of his creations, Elite. Days before, the creator of the series had already denied this information during the presentation of their latest project for the North American streaming service: "I think they have been asked and talked about my current contract with Netflix, but I have not talked to anyone about my contract and they don't know what contract I have. Netflix would not have prevented me from going back to 'Física o Química to do two chapters".

After the premiere of this sequel, Montero criticized that his name had not been included in the credits of this special season that has served as a reunion to the characters he had created. After his complaint, those responsible for the revival have rectified and in his last episode credited the author as the creator of the characters.

== Episodes ==
No.	Title	Directed by	Written by	Original release date
1	"Cosas que hacer antes de casarse"	Juanma Pachón	Carlos García Miranda	27 December 2020
2	"Sí, puedes volver atrás"	Juanma Pachón	Carlos García Miranda	3 January 2021
