= The Final Problem (TV series) =

- El problema final
- Genre: Mystery; Thriller; Period drama
- Based on: El problema final by Arturo Pérez-Reverte
- Written by: Alberto Macías; Carlos Molinero; Marisol Farré
- Directed by: Félix Viscarret
- Starring: José Coronado; María Valverde; Martiño Rivas; Maribel Verdú
- Country of origin: Spain
- Original language: Spanish

Production
- Executive producer: Urko Errazquin
- Producers: Fernando Bovaira; Sergio Díaz Bermejo; Gloria Rúa
- Cinematography: Daniel Sosa Segura
- Production company: MOD Producciones

Original release
- Network: Netflix
- Release: 25 September 2026

The Final Problem (Spanish: El problema final) is a 2026 Spanish murder mystery television miniseries based on the 2023 novel The Final Problem by Arturo Pérez-Reverte. The series was directed by Félix Viscarret and written by Alberto Macías, Carlos Molinero and Marisol Farré. It stars José Coronado, María Valverde, Martiño Rivas and Maribel Verdú, among others.

Set in the spring of 1959, the series follows thirteen people stranded on a small island near Mallorca by a violent storm. When an English tourist named Elisa Mander is found dead at their hotel, Benjamin Basil, a retired actor who once portrayed Sherlock Holmes in films, becomes involved in investigating the apparent murder. As suspicion spreads among the guests and hotel staff, the investigation reveals a complex mystery.

Produced by MOD Producciones, the four-episode miniseries premiered on Netflix on 25 September 2026.

== Plot ==
In 1959, thirteen people arrive on a small islet off the coast of Mallorca, Spain. Among them is Benjamin Basil, a retired actor known for his longstanding portrayal of Sherlock Holmes in films. When a violent storm isolates the island and prevents the group from seeking outside help, one of the guests is found dead at the hotel. Basil becomes involved in investigating the death, drawing on his familiarity with detective fiction and his experience portraying Holmes.

As the investigation progresses, further deaths and suspicious circumstances complicate the case. Basil and aspiring writer Francisco Foxá examine the evidence while the guests' conflicting accounts and concealed pasts create uncertainty about the identity and motives of the killer. The apparent suicide that initiated the investigation proves to have been staged, and Basil eventually realises that the mystery involves an exchange of identities.

Basil discovers that the woman everyone believes to be Adela Figueroa is actually Elisa Mander. The real Adela is the woman who was found dead at the beginning of the investigation. Elisa had previously exchanged identities with Adela, who had been her employer, and subsequently killed her to assume her identity permanently. Elisa also killed Dr. Seruya to prevent him from exposing the deception and murdered Mr. Klemmer as an act of revenge for his role in the wartime death of her husband.

Basil pieces together the truth by reconsidering the evidence and identifying inconsistencies in the surviving woman's identity. After uncovering Elisa's role in the murders, he confronts her. Their conversation reveals that they had known each other years earlier and had been romantically involved. Despite discovering her crimes, Basil chooses not to hand Elisa over to the authorities immediately, allowing her to leave while retaining knowledge of her true identity.

== Cast ==
The series features the following cast members:

- José Coronado as Benjamin Basil, a retired actor known for portraying Sherlock Holmes in films who becomes involved in a murder investigation.
- María Valverde as Adela Figueroa, a woman whose identity is central to the mystery.
- Martiño Rivas as Francisco Foxá, an aspiring thriller writer who assists Basil with the investigation.
- Maribel Verdú as Mrs. Raquel Ausländer, the manager of the hotel where the guests are stranded.
- Gonzalo de Castro as Fonseca, a film director connected to Basil's professional life.
- Cristina Kovani as Vicky, a young actress staying at the hotel.
- José Condessa as Tony, one of the characters involved in the events at the hotel.
- Pepón Nieto as Doctor Seruya, a doctor whose involvement becomes significant during the investigation.

== Production ==
Filming for the series began in April 2025 in Lloret de Mar, Catalonia, Spain, before continuing at production facilities in Tres Cantos and at locations in Madrid and Toledo. The production was directed by Félix Viscarret and written by Alberto Macías, Carlos Molinero and Marisol Farré. MOD Producciones produced the series, with Fernando Bovaira as producer and Urko Errazquin as executive producer.

Netflix formally announced the principal cast in May 2025. The series is based on the novel The Final Problem by Arturo Pérez-Reverte.

== Release ==
The serial, which consists of 4 episodes, was released on September 25, 2026.

== Episodes ==
The miniseries consists of four episodes.

Episodes of The Final Problem
No.	Title	Directed by	Written by	Runtime	Original release date	Synopsis
1	"Episode 1"	Félix Viscarret	Alberto Macías, Carlos Molinero, Marisol Farré	57 minutes	September 25, 2026	Benjamin Basil travels to Mallorca hoping to revive his acting career. A death at an isolated hotel draws him into a murder investigation.
2	"Episode 2"	Félix Viscarret	Alberto Macías, Carlos Molinero, Marisol Farré	35 minutes	September 25, 2026	A murder weapon is discovered in Basil's room, increasing his concern that the killer may strike again. Vicky makes an accusation that raises further questions.
3	"Episode 3"	Félix Viscarret	Alberto Macías, Carlos Molinero, Marisol Farré	42 minutes	September 25, 2026	The hotel takes drastic measures as contact with the police is established and suspicion grows among the guests.
4	"Episode 4"	Félix Viscarret	Alberto Macías, Carlos Molinero, Marisol Farré	48 minutes	September 25, 2026	Basil continues investigating the events at Santa Águeda. A film production brings new information to light as the mystery approaches its resolution.

== See also ==
- 2026 in Spanish television
