= El Caso. Crónica de sucesos =

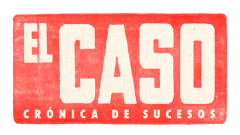
- Genre: Procedural drama Mystery
- Based on: the original idea by Fernando Guillén Cuervo
- Screenplay by: Olga Salvador; Mauricio Romero; Joan Barbero; Juan Moya; Guadalupe Rilova
- Directed by: Iñaki Mercero; Javier Quintas; José Ramos Paíno
- Starring: Verónica Sánchez; Fernando Guillén Cuervo
- Country of origin: Spain
- Original language: Spanish
- No. of seasons: 1
- No. of episodes: 13

Production
- Running time: 70 min (approx.)
- Production companies: RTVE; Plano a Plano

Original release
- Network: La 1
- Release: 15 March – 7 June 2016

Related
- Abducidos

El Caso. Crónica de sucesos is a Spanish procedural television series, starring Verónica Sánchez and Fernando Guillén Cuervo. The plot follows two investigative journalists working for a sensationalist newspaper in Francoist Spain. Produced by RTVE in collaboration with Plano a Plano, it aired in 2016 on La 1.

== Premise ==
The fiction is set in Madrid in 1966. The plot tells the story of a newspaper's newsroom specialised in reporting lurid crimes happening in Francoist Spain, focusing on the reports of two investigative journalists working for the newspaper El Caso, Clara López (Verónica Sánchez) and Jesús Expósito (Fernando Guillén Cuervo), often running parallel to the police investigations.

== Cast ==
- Verónica Sánchez as Clara López-Doriga, new journalist of El Caso, upper-middle-class woman educated abroad.
- Fernando Guillén Cuervo as Jesús Expósito, investigative journalist of El Caso, former policeman.
- Antonio Garrido as Antonio Camacho, chief police officer, antagonistic towards Jesús.
- Francisco Ortiz as Miguel Montenegro, young police officer.
- Natalia Verbeke as Rebeca Martín, forensic doctor, friend of Jesús.
- Fernando Cayo as Rodrigo Sánchez, editor of El Caso.
- Gorka Lasaosa as Germán Castro, journalist and boxer.
- Blanca Apilánez as Margarita Moyano, experienced journalist.
- Daniel Pérez Prada as Aníbal de Vicente, a writer of El Caso.
- Teresa Hurtado de Ory as Paloma García, secretary of El Caso.
- Marc Clotet as Gerardo de Zabaleta, Clara's husband, a diplomat.
- María Casal as Laura, Clara's aunt, an actress.
- Carlos Manuel Díaz as Fernando López-Dóriga, Clara's father, a senior civil servant at the Ministry of Information and Tourism.
- Ignacio Mateos as Aparicio Huesca, designer and illustrator of El Caso.
- Raúl Tejón as Manuel Cabrera, a civil servant working at the Ministry of Information and Tourism.

== Production and release ==
El Caso. Crónica de sucesos, a RTVE production in collaboration with Plano a Plano, is based on an original idea by Fernando Guillén Cuervo seeking to fictionalise and pay homage to El Caso, a real sensationalist weekly newspaper published in Spain from 1952 to 1997.

Iñaki Mercero, Javier Quintas and José Ramos Paíno directed the episodes, whereas Olga Salvador, Mauricio Romero, Joan Barbero, Juan Moya and Guadalupe Rilova authored the screenplay. The series began shooting on 21 October 2015. A 1,500 square metre set in San Sebastián de los Reyes was used for much of the indoor filming, including the editorial office of the newspaper and the police premises.

The series consisted of 13 episodes with an approximate running time of 70 minutes. The series premiered on 15 March 2016. The marketing of the series employed an early example of transmedia storytelling in Spanish TV, by means of the release of a 10-min shortfilm on 12 April 2016 in order to engage the public. The broadcasting run ended on 7 June 2016. While the series received critical acclaim, the viewership figures were not considered good enough by RTVE to renew the series for a second season. The series sparked a spin-off web series, Abducidos, focused on two characters from the original series (Aníbal and Aparicio) now working for the Spanish public television broadcaster.

Series	Episodes	Originally released			Viewers	Share (%)	Ref.
Series	Episodes	First released	Last released	Network	Viewers	Share (%)	Ref.
1	13	15 April 2016	7 June 2016	tve	1,990,231	10.58	

This is a caption
No. in season	Title	Viewers	Original release date	Share (%)
1	"El crimen del abrevadero"	2,531,000	15 March 2016	13.2
2	"El loco del estilete"	2,158,000	22 March 2016	12.5
3	"El caso del niño pintor"	1,839,000	29 March 2016	9.6
4	"Una relación inapropiada"	1,841,000	5 April 2016	9.0
5	"Operación Ituren"	1,754,000	12 April 2016	9.0
6	"El asesino de la mirilla"	1,938,000	19 April 2016	10.2
7	"Garrote vil"	1,901,000	26 April 2016	9.8
8	"El mercado del nácar"	1,803,000	4 May 2016	9.4
9	"El misterio de la mano cortada"	2,108,000	10 May 2016	11.2
10	"Como alimañas"	1,807,000	17 May 2016	9.8
11	"El caso del ahorcado"	1,874,000	24 May 2016	10.2
12	"Picnic fatal"	2,124,000	31 May 2016	11.5
13	"Choque de trenes"	2,195,000	7 June 2016	12.2

== Awards and nominations ==
Year	Award	Category	Nominee(s)	Result	Ref.
2016	8th FesTVal Vitoria-Gasteiz	Best Fiction		Won	
2016	4th MiM Series Awards	Best Drama Actress	Verónica Sánchez	Nominated	
2017	4th Feroz Awards	Best Drama Series		Nominated	
2017	4th Feroz Awards	Best Actress in a TV Series	Verónica Sánchez	Nominated	
2017	4th Feroz Awards	Best Actor in a TV Series	Fernando Guillén Cuervo	Nominated	
