= The Last Passenger =

2013 novel by Manel Loureiro

First edition (publ. Planeta)

The Last Passenger (Spanish: El último pasajero) is a 2013 novel written by Manel Loureiro. The plot is about a British journalist named Kate Kilroy who wants to finish her late husband's last story, which tells the story of the Valkyrie, a German 1930s ocean liner where mysterious disappearances have occurred since its maiden voyage. With the desire to finish the story and some curiosity, Kate decides to board the vessel on its new voyage, a voyage from which she might never return. Kate Kilroy boards the Valkyrie in Hamburg, Germany. 20 days after its publishing, The Last Passenger was listed on Amazon US's Best Sellers and is the first Spanish author to achieve this.

== Plot ==
August 28, 1939. A coal-cargo ship named Pass of Ballaster is heading towards Bristol when it finds an abandoned-looking ocean liner named Valkyrie. A rescue team is assembled and sent to check the mysterious ship. When they board, they find a very interesting puzzle: a deserted ship, with recently cooked meals in the dining room; a few months-old baby dropped in the ballroom; and something else, something evil that no one can identify.

Present Day. Journalist Kate Kilroy is recovering from her husband's sudden death. In his memory, she decides to finish and publish the story he was working on before his death, the Valkyrie. She starts to research it and goes to an old naval base in northern England for some information. The local officers tell Kate the story of the Valkyrie and her ghostly legacy. She also learns that the ship's new owner is a multi-millionaire man named Isaac Feldman, who does anything to get what he wants. Kate meets an old man who was on board the Pass of Ballaster the night she found the Valkyrie. He tells her what happened on the ship when they first boarded, and what happened to the others from the crew. After trying to break into Isaac Feldman's house, Kate tells him what she knows about the ship and he reveals that he was the baby found in Valkyrie's ballroom. When she goes back to see the old man with Feldman, she finds him mutilated and deceased. Now being the only person who knows the whole story, Kate is invited by Feldman to join his team on the new voyage of the Valkyrie, to find out what really happened in 1939.
