= Ella, maldita alma =

- Genre: Drama
- Created by: Aurora Garrido
- Based on: "Ella, maldita alma" by Manuel Rivas
- Showrunner: César Benítez
- Directed by: Iñaki Mercero
- Starring: Maxi Iglesias; Karina Kolokolchykova; Martiño Rivas
- Country of origin: Spain
- Original language: Spanish
- No. of seasons: 1

Production
- Producer: Álvaro Benítez
- Production company: Plano a Plano

Original release
- Network: Telecinco

Ella, maldita alma is a Spanish limited television series created by Aurora Garrido based on a short story by Galician author Manuel Rivas. It stars Maxi Iglesias, Karina Kolokolchykova and Martiño Rivas. It was produced by Plano a Plano.

Set in a small town of the province of Cádiz, the plot examinates a love triangle between a priest, his cousin, and the latter's wife.

The official premiere will become in September of 2025 in the South Series Cadiz Festival.

Finally Telecinco set 18 june of 2026 as release date in open network

== Plot ==
The life of Fermín, a young and attractive priest, much loved and admired by the inhabitants of La Isleta, the beautiful coastal town where his parish is located, becomes complicated when his beloved cousin Isaac and his beautiful wife, Ana, move there to live, to whom he almost immediately begins to feel attracted. When he discovers that she harbors the same feelings, a fierce struggle breaks out within him, because if he gives in to temptation, the betrayal will be twofold: on the one hand he would deceive God, to whom he has dedicated his entire life, and on the other his cousin, whom he loves like a brother. For her part, Ana believes that she has an unpayable debt to Isaac for having taken her away from her difficult and tragic past, so both will begin to live the nightmare of having to give up their happiness for loyalty. In this situation, the couple will not only have to face a complicated moral dilemma, but also more mundane obstacles... and dangerous ones.

== Cast ==
- Maxi Iglesias as Fermín
- Karina Kolokolchykova as Ana
- Martiño Rivas as Issac
- Nacho Fresneda as Oliva
- Carmen Daza as Mariela
- Susana Córdoba as Amalia
- Paco Márquez as Mateo
- María de Nati as Clara
- Antonio Gil as Ramiro
- Juanpe Avomo as Riako
- Paco Marín as Lucas
- Ana Ruiz as Dolores

== Production ==
The production began in mid October 2024 with an official note of production. The main cast was announced on 16 October.

== Shooting ==
Shooting started in the last week of October in Cádiz.

== Marketing ==
A first advance of the series was presented at the Cádiz-based South International Series Festival.
