= Dos años y un día =

- Created by: Raúl Navarro; Miguel Esteban; Sergio Sarriá; Luimi Pérez
- Directed by: Raúl Navarro; Ernesto Sevilla
- Starring: Arturo Valls; Adriana Torrebejano; Amaia Salamanca; Fernando Gil; Michael John Trenor; Javier Botet
- Country of origin: Spain
- Original language: Spanish
- No. of seasons: 1
- No. of episodes: 6

Production
- Executive producers: Montse García; Jorge Pezzi; Arturo Valls; Félix Tusell
- Production companies: Atresmedia Televisión; LACOproductora; Estela Films; Pólvora Films; Globomedia

Original release
- Network: ATRESplayer Premium
- Release: 3 July 2022

Dos años y un día (transl. 'Two Years and One Day') is a Spanish prison comedy television series created and written by Raúl Navarro, Miguel Esteban, Sergio Sarriá and Luimi Pérez that began airing on 3 July 2022 on Atresplayer Premium. It stars Arturo Valls alongside Adriana Torrebejano, Amaia Salamanca, Fernando Gil, Michael John Treanor and Javier Botet.

== Plot ==
Carlos Ferrer is a popular television host and comedian sentenced to two years and one day in prison for an offence against religious sensibilities.

== Cast ==
- Arturo Valls as Carlos Ferrer
- Adriana Torrebejano as Laura Ruibal
- Amaia Salamanca as Verónica
- Fernando Gil as Carlos (prison's security guard)
- Michael John Treanor as El Rubio
- Javier Botet as Adolfo
- Manuel Galiana as Don Jaime
- Betsy Túrnez
- Carlos Librado "Nene"
- Santi Ugalde
- Paco Churruca
- Jorge Rueda

The series also features cameos by Los Javis (Javier Calvo & Javier Ambrossi) and Mónica Carrillo.

== Production ==
The series was produced by Atresmedia Televisión alongside LACOproductora, Estela Films, Pólvora Films and Globomedia (The Mediapro Studio). It consists of 6 episodes featuring an average running time of 30 minutes. Raúl Navarro and Ernesto Sevilla took over direction duties.

== Release ==
The series premiered on 3 July 2022 on Atresplayer Premium.
