= Eva Ugarte =

Spanish actress

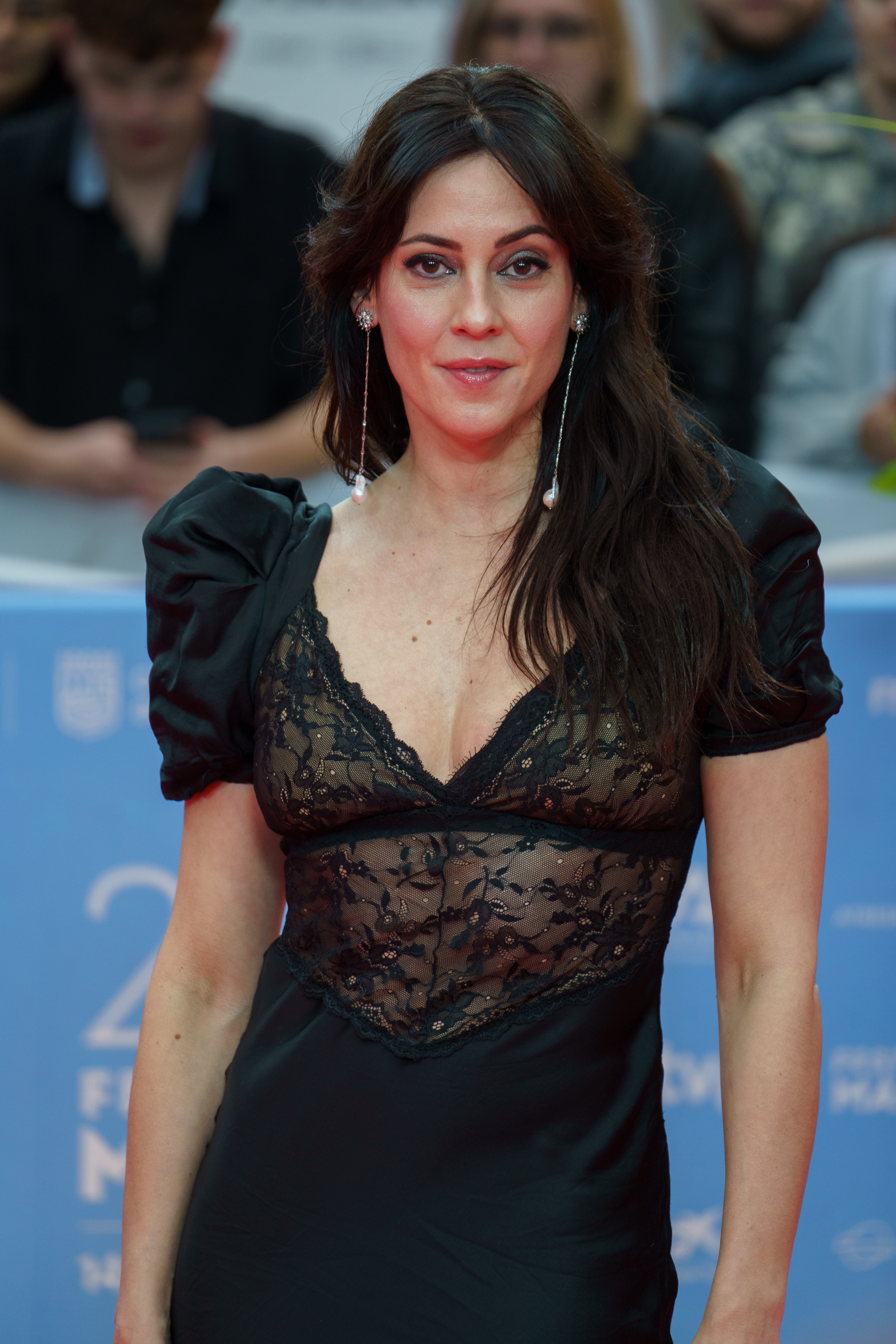
- Ugarte in 2025
- Born: 14 December 1983 (age 42); Madrid, Spain
- Occupation: Actress

Eva Ugarte (born 14 December 1983) is a Spanish actress. She won notoriety for her performance in the comedy television series Mira lo que has hecho.

== Life and career ==
Ugarte was born on 14 December 1983 in Madrid, although she was raised in Tres Cantos. She received acting training at the William Layton lab and the RESAD. Before her acting career took off, she worked at Disneyland Paris employed as a princess-dressed saleswoman. She made her first steps in screen in the television series Bicho malo. It was followed by appearances in the sketch comedy show Vaya semanita as well as the series Velvet, La pecera de Eva, Con el culo al aire, Homicidios, Cita a ciegas, and Bajo sospecha.

Her portrayal of Sandra in the comedy television series Mira lo que has hecho (2018–20) was a breakthrough role for Ugarte, and earned her notoriety as well as back-to-back nominations for the Feroz Award for Best Main Actress in a Series.

== Filmography ==
=== Film ===
Year	Title	Role	Notes	Ref.
2021	Fuimos canciones (Sounds Like Love)	Raquel		
2021	Mamá o papá (You Keep the Kids!)	Marina		
2022	El juego de las llaves	Laura		
2022	Mamá, no enRedes	Raquel		
2022	Por los pelos	Inma		
2022	Reyes contra Santa	Belén		
2023	Bajo terapia (Under Therapy)	Carla		
2023	Cuánto me queda	María		
2025	La buena suerte (The Good Luck)	Regina		
2025	La cena (The Dinner)	Luchi		

=== Television ===
Year	Title	Role	Notes	Ref.
2016	Bajo sospecha	Natalia Sanz	Season 2	
2018–20	Mira lo que has hecho	Sandra		
2020	Madres. Amor y vida	Paula Artigas	Seasons 1–2	
2023	El otro lado (The Other Side)	Juana		
2024	¿A qué estás esperando?	Carol		
