= El don de Alba =

- Genre: Supernatural drama
- Based on: Ghost Whisperer
- Starring: Patricia Montero; Martiño Rivas; Antonio Hortelano
- Country of origin: Spain
- Original language: Spanish
- No. of seasons: 1
- No. of episodes: 13

Production
- Production company: Disney Media Distribution

Original release
- Network: Telecinco
- Release: 9 April – 16 July 2013

El don de Alba (lit. 'Alba's Gift') is a Spanish supernatural television series consisting of a remake of the American series Ghost Whisperer, starring Patricia Montero, Martiño Rivas and Antonio Hortelano. Produced by Disney Media Distribution for Telecinco, it aired in 2013.

== Premise ==
The fiction follows Alba Rivas (Patricia Montero), a young woman tasked with the mission of helping the dead ones to cross to "the other side" after the death of her grandmother. Just arrived to the village of "Bellavista", Alba counts with help from Gabriel Vega (Antonio Hortelano), an employee at the municipal archives with a great deal of interest in the supernatural. Meanwhile, she establishes a relationship with Pablo Escudero (Martiño Rivas), a sceptical physician who has just graduated.

== Cast ==
- Patricia Montero as Alba Rivas.
- Martiño Rivas as Pablo Escudero.
- Antonio Hortelano as Gabriel Vega.
- Itsaso Arana as Andrea Santos.
- Carmela Poch as Nuria Guerrero.
- Carmen Sánchez as Alicia Ramos.
- Ismael Martínez as Ramón Ramon.
- Ramiro Blas as the "Faceless Man".

== Production and release ==
Consisting of an adaptation of the American series Ghost Whisperer, El don de Alba was produced by Disney Media Distribution for Telecinco. Filming began in 2012. The series premiered on 9 April 2013 in prime time. Interest in the series progressively waned, ending its intermittent broadcasting run on 16 July 2013, averaging 1,641,923 viewers and a 9.2% audience share across its 13 episodes.

Series	Episodes	Originally released			Viewers	Share (%)	Ref.
Series	Episodes	First released	Last released	Network	Viewers	Share (%)	Ref.
1	13	9 April 2013	16 July 2013	Telecinco	1,641,923	9.2	

This is a caption
No. in season	Title	Viewers	Original release date	Share (%)
1	"Espíritu dividido"	2,482,000	9 April 2013	13.2
2	"Dos mundos"	2,188,000	16 April 2013	11.8
3	"El camino del perdón"	1,820,000	23 April 2013	9.6
4	"La última noche"	1,516,000	30 April 2013	7.7
5	"Extraña pareja"	1,832,000	7 May 2013	10.1
6	"Juguetes perdidos"	1,671,000	14 May 2013	9.3
7	"La novia blanca"	1,813,000	21 May 2013	9.9
8	"El último fantasma"	1,683,000	28 May 2013	9.4
9	"Perdido en la montaña"	1,520,000	4 June 2013	8.3
10	"Los niños perdidos"	1,525,000	11 June 2013	8.3
11	"El crimen de la estación"	988,000	2 July 2013	5.7
12	"La elegida (I)"	1,080,000	9 July 2013	7.2
13	"La elegida (II)"	1,227,000	16 July 2013	10.0
