= Mira lo que has hecho =

Spanish TV comedy series

- Genre: Comedy
- Created by: Berto Romero
- Written by: Berto Romero; Rafel Barceló; Enric Pardo
- Directed by: Carlos Therón; Javier Ruiz Caldera
- Starring: Berto Romero; Eva Ugarte
- Country of origin: Spain
- Original language: Spanish
- No. of seasons: 3
- No. of episodes: 18

Production
- Production company: Movistar+

Original release
- Network: Movistar+
- Release: 23 February 2018 – 3 July 2020

Mira lo que has hecho (transl. 'Look What You've Done') is a Spanish comedy television series created by Berto Romero that originally aired from 2018 to 2020 on Movistar+. It stars Berto Romero and Eva Ugarte.

== Premise ==
The fiction, focused on the couple formed by Berto—a comedian and host—and Sandra—an anaesthesiologist doctor—, starts with the arrival of their first child.

== Cast ==
- Berto Romero as Berto.
- Eva Ugarte as Sandra.
- Carmen Esteban as Angela.
- Inma Sancho as Olga.
- Chete Lera as Ramón.
- Anna Carreño as Rosa.
- Mariano Venancio as Julio.
- Jordi Aguilar as Jose.

Introduced in season 2

- Belén Cuesta
- Núria Gago

== Production and release ==
Created by Berto Romero, the series was written by the former together with Rafel Barceló and Enric Pardo. Season 1 was directed by Carlos Therón whereas seasons 2 and 3 were directed by Javier Ruiz Caldera. Filming locations included a number of places in Catalonia. The series premiered on 23 February 2018. The broadcasting run of the third and last season ended on 3 July 2020.

Series	Episodes	Originally released			Ref.
Series	Episodes	First released	Last released	Network	Ref.
1	6	23 February 2018		Movistar+	
2	6	21 February 2019	22 February 2019	Movistar+	
3	6	18 June 2020	2 July 2020	Movistar+	

=== Season 1 ===
No. overall	No. in season	Title	Directed by	Original release date
1	1	"Legítimo material para pajas"	Carlos Therón	23 February 2018
2	2	"El ocaso de Occidente"	Carlos Therón	23 February 2018
3	3	"Guardipapis"	Carlos Therón	23 February 2018
4	4	"Hotfire"	Carlos Therón	23 February 2018
5	5	"Seguimos vivos"	Carlos Therón	23 February 2018
6	6	"Papá"	Carlos Therón	23 February 2018

=== Season 2 ===
No. overall	No. in season	Title	Directed by	Original release date
7	1	"Sudor y lágrimas"	Javier Ruiz Caldera	21 February 2019
8	2	"El hijo de Beto"	Javier Ruiz Caldera	21 February 2019
9	3	"La noche de la iguana"	Javier Ruiz Caldera	22 February 2019
10	4	"La dolce vita"	Javier Ruiz Caldera	22 February 2019
11	5	"Piñata"	Javier Ruiz Caldera	22 February 2019
12	6	"Los terribles dos"	Javier Ruiz Caldera	22 February 2019

=== Season 3 ===
No. overall	No. in season	Title	Directed by	Original release date
13	1	"Primera línea de fuego"	Javier Ruiz Caldera	18 June 2020
14	2	"Justicia ciega"	Javier Ruiz Caldera	18 June 2020
15	3	"Ultra Pressure"	Javier Ruiz Caldera	24 June 2020
16	4	"El condón de la suerte"	Javier Ruiz Caldera	24 June 2020
17	5	"Nula visión"	Javier Ruiz Caldera	2 July 2020
18	6	"Mira lo que has hecho"	Javier Ruiz Caldera	2 July 2020

== Awards and nominations ==
Year	Award	Category	Nominee(s)	Result	Ref.
2018	6th MiM Series Awards	Best Comedy Series		Won	
2019	6th Feroz Awards	Best Leading Actress (TV)	Eva Ugarte	Nominated	
2020	7th Feroz Awards	Best Leading Actress (TV)	Eva Ugarte	Nominated	
2021	8th Feroz Awards	Best Comedy Series		Nominated	
