= Gran Hotel (TV series) =

Spanish TV series

- Genre: Historical drama
- Created by: Ramón Campos; Gema R. Neira
- Starring: Yon González; Amaia Salamanca; Adriana Ozores; Pedro Alonso; Concha Velasco; Megan Montaner; Llorenç González; Pep Antón Muñoz
- Country of origin: Spain
- Original language: Spanish
- No. of seasons: 3
- No. of episodes: 39

Production
- Executive producers: Ramón Campos; Teresa Fernández-Valdés
- Producer: Bambú Producciones
- Production location: Santander
- Running time: 70–80 minutes

Original release
- Network: Antena 3
- Release: 4 October 2011 – 25 June 2013

Related
- El hotel de los secretos; Grand Hotel; Secret of the Nile

Gran Hotel (English: Grand Hotel) is a Spanish drama television series created by Ramón Campos and Gema R. Neira which stars Yon González and Amaia Salamanca. It originally aired on Antena 3 from 2011 to 2013. It debuted on Sky Arts 1 in the UK in 2012.

Produced by Bambú Producciones, the series was filmed at the Palacio de la Magdalena in Santander. It is set in an early 20th century aristocratic hotel during the reign of Alfonso XIII and is centered on the mysteries that involve the owner's family and the hotel servants.

== Plot ==
The events take place in 1906–1907 in Spain, near a town called Cantaloa. The working-class Julio Olmedo arrives at the luxurious Grand Hotel to visit his sister Cristina, who works there as a maid. Julio is told by a waiter that Cristina was fired for theft a month before, a story Julio does not buy. The unlikely story leads Julio to take a job at the hotel so he can investigate his sister's disappearance. He soon finds an ally in Alicia Alarcón, one of the daughters of the hotel's owner Doña Teresa, who also has suspicions surrounding events occurring at the hotel. Together, Julio and Alicia work to uncover the secrets of the Gran Hotel.

=== Season 1 ===
Julio Olmedo arrives at the Gran Hotel to look for his sister Cristina. When he learns that she has been fired for theft and that no one has any idea of her whereabouts, he joins the hotel staff as a waiter. He is assisted by Andrés, the son of the head housekeeper. Julio joins the waiters and poses as a guest during a dinner in order to meet a woman called “Lady.” Andrés had told Julio that Cristina was fired because she stole Lady’s jewels, a story Julio does not believe. He brings it up casually while talking to Lady, who seems utterly oblivious to any jewels being stolen. This confuses Julio. At the same time, he meets Alicia Alarcón, who is engaged to Diego Murquia, the hotel manager. Julio and Alicia share a cigarette and have a brief conversation.

The Alarcón family owns the hotel and lives in it. The head of the household is Doña Teresa, the wife of the late Carlos Alarcón. She and Carlos had three children: Sofía, Alicia, and Javier. Sofía is the oldest; she is married to Marqués Alfredo, who aims to become manager of the hotel, and she is pregnant. Tension grows within the family when Sofía learns that Alicia is engaged to Diego, indirectly revealing that Alfredo will no longer be able to become manager. Throughout the first episodes, tension between Alfredo and Sofía increases, leading Alfredo to consider leaving the hotel because he does not feel respected in Cantaloa. However, just as he is leaving, Sofía falls down the stairs. The doctor reveals that her uterus is damaged and she will be unable to have children. He also reports that she lost her baby. Doña Teresa arrives and convinces Sofía that Alfredo will leave her now that she has “lost her value” as a wife. So they come up with a plan: Sofía will continue pretending to be pregnant, and Doña Teresa blackmails the doctor into telling everyone that Sofía only injured her hip while she secretly prepares to find a baby.

Javier Alarcón is the middle child and the most problematic of the siblings. He brings a prostitute to the party Julio attends, much to his mother’s dismay. If there is anything Doña Teresa cares about more than her family, it seems to be her appearance in society. Teresa sends Diego to the bar to tell the owners that they will no longer give Javier any money. Javier is almost thrown out and beaten when Julio comes to his rescue. Julio defeats the men and takes Javier home. He had been following Javier because he believed Javier might be connected to Cristina’s disappearance. Throughout the season, Julio and Javier develop an almost friendly relationship, though they mainly use each other for their own benefit. The prostitute Javier brought is later murdered with a golden knife, prompting Detective Ayala to enter Cantaloa. The knife is traced back to the Gran Hotel, bringing Ayala closer into the story.

Around the same time, the bar owners come searching for Javier and demand that he bring Julio to fight for betting purposes, as they believe Julio is an excellent fighter. Javier refuses, but they threaten to tell Ayala that Javier was the last person to see the prostitute alive. Fearing that his mother will finally disown him, he goes to find Julio—who is in the dining hall—and demands he fight at the bar. Julio refuses, saying he has moved beyond that life. Javier then begins firing maids and waiters one by one. When Andrés enters the room and Javier looks at him, Julio realizes what Javier is about to do. Before Andrés can be fired, Julio agrees to fight again.

A few other important events occur in between. Alicia searches for Julio after the party, but she cannot find him in any hotel records. He claimed to be a cousin of Señor Molins, but no one seems to know him. Alicia finds a photograph that includes Julio and shows it to someone at the registry, who identifies him as Julio Espinosa, a waiter. Alicia confronts Julio, who tries to maintain his disguise as Julio Molins, but Alicia calls him out. Julio explains that he is at the hotel only to search for his sister. He presents the evidence he has gathered so far: Cristina’s bloody garment and the discovery that her firing was fabricated. He suspects she was murdered, and Alicia decides to help him.

Meanwhile, tensions rise between Diego, Alicia, Julio, and a waiter who has been threatening Diego with a note demanding money or he will reveal what happened to Cristina. Alicia discovers who he is. He holds her hostage with a knife while speaking to Julio, but before he can reveal anything, Diego shoots him from a distance. Because this death is considered an act of protection, Ayala does not convict Diego. The scene ends with Julio and Alicia confirming Diego’s innocence based on the waiter’s last words.

Yet there is more to Diego than meets the eye. Diego had been in a romantic relationship with Belén, a maid at the hotel. She is promoted to floor manager after Cristina “leaves.” Belén has been sleeping with Diego, and she reveals to him that she is pregnant with his child. She warns him that if he does not want his future wife to find out, he needs to provide for them. Diego laughs it off, and the conversation ends with Diego attempting to dismiss Belén from the hotel, claiming that guests have complained about her. He is nearly successful, but as Belén is leaving, she encounters Andrés. Andrés is in love with Belén and does not want her to leave. He tells his mother, Ángela, the head housekeeper, that Belén’s child is his. Although Ángela dislikes Belén, she wants to protect her son, so she asks Doña Teresa to allow Belén to stay because she is pregnant with Andrés’s child. Doña Teresa agrees, and Belén remains at the hotel.

Later, Teresa speaks with Belén and they make an arrangement: Belén will give up her child once it is born in exchange for money. Andrés is unaware of any of this and does not know who the real father is. Diego is surprised and angered to see Belén still at the hotel, but he can do nothing. Meanwhile, Andrés prepares to raise the baby as his own and plans to marry Belén, while Ángela does everything she can to make Belén’s life miserable and get rid of her once she realizes the truth—that Belén is manipulating Andrés, who is simply in love with her.

At the end of the season, Alicia marries Diego despite being in love with Julio.

=== Season 2 ===
After Andrés is injured while changing the lightbulbs in the Gran Hotel's dining room, Julio decides to stay at the hotel because he suspects that his friend's accident might be a murder attempt. When Alicia returns from her honeymoon, Julio must regain her trust so that she'll help him in this new investigation. They discover more secrets related to the hotel's late owner, Carlos Alarcón, that could spell the end of the Gran Hotel.

=== Season 3 ===
This season follows the same investigations as the previous season, but this time Alicia, Julio, and Andrés have the help of Detective Ayala, his assistant Hernando, and Alicia's best friend the lawyer Maite. They also discover new secrets about Diego Murquía involving an identity document and a new enemy who sets off an explosion in the Gran Hotel.

== Cast ==
- Yon González as Julio Olmedo
- Amaia Salamanca as Alicia Alarcón / Murquía
- Adriana Ozores as doña Teresa Aldecoa de Alarcón
- Eloy Azorín as Javier Alarcón
- Fele Martínez as Alfredo Vergara
- Manuel de Blas as Don Benjamín Nieto
- Pep Anton Muñoz as detective Ayala
- Antonio Reyes as Hernando
- Pedro Alonso as Diego Murquía / Adrián Vera Celande
- Luz Valdenebro as Sofía Vergara
- Marta Larralde as Belén Martín
- Llorenç González as Andrés Cernuda
- Concha Velasco as doña Ángela Salinas
- Megan Montaner as Maite Ribelles
- Iván Morales as Sebastián
- Lluís Homar as Samuel Arriaga / Jesús Manzano Cisneros
- Silvia Marsó as Adriana
- Marta Hazas as Laura
- Juan Luis Galiardo as Ernesto Valera
- Jordi Bosch as Carlos Alarcón

== Episodes ==
=== Series overview ===
Series	Episodes	Originally released	
Series	Episodes	First released	Last released
1	9	4 October 2011	6 December 2011
2	8	3 October 2012	21 November 2012
3	22	22 January 2013	25 June 2013

In their original Spanish broadcast, episodes had a length of roughly 70 minutes each. For the international stream, Netflix recut all episodes to be 45 minutes of length and repackaged the seasons, resulting in 14 episodes in season 1, 28 episodes in season 2 (which includes the first third of the original season 3), and 24 episodes in season 3.

=== Season 1 (2011) ===
No. overall	No. in season	Title	Directed by	Original release date	Spain viewers (millions)
1	1	"La doncella en el estanque"	Carlos Sedes	4 October 2011	3.71
Julio Olmedo, a young man of humble origin, travels to Cantaloa to visit his sister Cristina, one of the maids of the Grand Hotel. But when he arrives, Julio runs into an ungrateful victim: it's been over a month since anyone knows anything about his sister after she was expelled from the hotel for a supposed robbery. Convinced that there is something obscure in the disappearance of Cristina, Julio decides to stay at the Grand Hotel.
2	2	"El anónimo"	Carlos Sedes	11 October 2011	3.47
Julio runs into the final test that confirms that his sister has not left the Gran Hotel; Someone has tried to burn Cristina's bloody clothes in one of the hotel kitchens.
3	3	"El cuchillo de oro"	Sílvia Quer	18 October 2011	3.40
Julio is closer than ever to find out who murdered his sister and the main suspect is none other than Diego, Alicia's fiance. Without a proof that proves it, Julio will only have one possible way for his investigation; find the author of the anonymous Diego, the only person who can shed light on the death of Cristina.
4	4	"La casa abandonada"	Sílvia Quer	25 October 2011	3.30
5	5	"Luna de sangre"	Carlos Sedes	1 November 2011	3.41
6	6	"La joya desaparecida"	Jorge Sánchez Cabezudo	8 November 2011	3.28
7	7	"La carta robada"	Carlos Sedes	22 November 2011	3.56
8	8	"La sangre de la doncella"	Jorge Sánchez Cabezudo	29 November 2011	2.96
9	9	"La huella"	Sílvia Quer	6 December 2011	3.44

=== Season 2 (2012) ===
No. overall	No. in season	Title	Directed by	Original release date	Spain viewers (millions)
10	1	"Luces y sombras"	Sílvia Quer	3 October 2012	2.82
11	2	"Un llanto en la noche"	Sílvia Quer	10 October 2012	3.09
12	3	"El secreto"	Max Lemcke	17 October 2012	2.82
13	4	"Retorno al pasado"	Max Lemcke	24 October 2012	2.66
14	5	"Cecilia"	Jorge Torregrossa	31 October 2012	2.29
15	6	"El aniversario"	Jorge Torregrossa	7 November 2012	2.90
16	7	"El bautizo"	Sílvia Quer	14 November 2012	2.90
17	8	"El camarógrafo"	Sílvia Quer	21 November 2012	2.94

=== Season 3 (2013) ===
No. overall	No. in season	Title	Directed by	Original release date	Spain viewers (millions)
18	1	"Baile de máscaras"	David Pinillos	22 January 2013	2.62
19	2	"Propósito de enmienda"	David Pinillos	29 January 2013	2.78
20	3	"El secuestro"	Manuel Gómez Pereira	5 February 2013	2.61
21	4	"Álbum de familia"	Manuel Gómez Pereira	12 February 2013	N/A
22	5	"El juego de las apariencias"	Carlos Sedes	19 February 2013	2.74
23	6	"Lazos de sangre"	Carlos Sedes	26 February 2013	2.51
24	7	"El círculo del mediodía"	Sílvia Quer	5 March 2013	2.57
25	8	"La última noche"	Sílvia Quer	13 March 2013	2.73
26	9	"El primer día"	Sílvia Quer	19 March 2013	2.72
27	10	"Valtejar"	Sílvia Quer	2 April 2013	2.71
28	11	"La venta"	Carlos Sedes	9 April 2013	2.60
29	12	"El torreón"	Carlos Sedes	16 April 2013	2.69
30	13	"Nobleza obliga"	David Pinillos	23 April 2013	2.70
31	14	"La subasta"	David Pinillos	30 April 2013	2.54
32	15	"La variante del dragón"	Sílvia Quer	7 May 2013	2.60
33	16	"El enemigo en casa"	Sílvia Quer	14 May 2013	2.50
34	17	"El escarmiento"	Carlos Sedes	21 May 2013	2.51
35	18	"La ejecución"	Carlos Sedes	28 May 2013	2.61
36	19	"La salud de los difuntos"	Jorge Sánchez Cabezudo	4 June 2013	2.66
37	20	"Revancha"	Jorge Sánchez Cabezudo	11 June 2013	2.56
38	21	"El sacrificio"	Sílvia Quer	18 June 2013	2.70
39	22	"Cólera"	Sílvia Quer	25 June 2013	2.62

== International broadcasts ==
In France, the series premiered on Téva on 1 June 2012 and on M6 on 4 July 2012. In Russia, it started airing on Domashny on 11 June 2012. The rights to broadcast Grand Hotel were acquired in the United Kingdom by Sky Arts. The series has also been sold to Turkey (Sinema TV Aşk), Lithuania (LNK), Estonia (Sony Entertainment Estonia and Kanal 11) and Venezuela (Televen). In Germany, the rights were acquired by Sony Entertainment Television and on the free-TV-channel Disney Channel. In Poland the series started on 12 November 2013 by AXN White in its dubbed in Polish. In Slovakia, broadcasting by RTVS TV canal, started on 7 January 2014. In Serbia, it started airing on RTS 2 on 10 March 2015. In Bulgaria the series started on 5 June 2015 on Nova Television. In Greece, the series was broadcast in 2014 by Nova.

In the United States, Grand Hotel premiered on VmeTV on 31 October 2013 in its original language.

In Iran, the series was dubbed in Persian language and broadcast by GEM TV.

== Ratings ==
On IMDb the series received a favourable 8.3 rating.

Viewership and ratings per season of Gran Hotel
Season	Episodes	First aired		Last aired		Avg. viewers (millions)
Season	Episodes	Date	Viewers (millions)	Date	Viewers (millions)	Avg. viewers (millions)
1	9	4 October 2011	3.71	6 December 2011	3.44	3.40
2	8	3 October 2012	2.82	21 November 2012	2.94	2.81
3	22	22 January 2013	2.62	25 June 2013	2.62	2.52

== International remakes ==
There have been several international remakes and adaptations of Gran Hotel:

- Italy's Rai 1 premiered an adaptation directed by Luca Ribuoli on 1 September 2015. The Italian version was re-titled in German-speaking countries as Hotel Imperial when it was broadcast by Servus TV on 29 July 2016. The Italian version consists of six episodes of two hours each, whereas the German broadcast has been divided into twelve one hour episodes.
- Mexican network Televisa produced an adaptation, El hotel de los secretos (The Hotel of Secrets), that premiered on Las Estrellas channel in January 2016.
- Egypt's CBC produced a popular Arabic market adaptation of Grand Hotel as a musalsal in 2016 which received critical acclaim and several awards. Netflix released the Egyptian version, under the title Secret of the Nile and with English, French, German, Italian and Spanish dubbed, on 15 March 2018. It was the first Egyptian series to air on Netflix.
- In the United States, ABC premiered an adaptation called Grand Hotel, set in Miami in the present day, on 17 June 2019. It was cancelled in October 2019 after one season.
- In France, TF1 produced and premiered an adaptation called Grand Hôtel, set on the French Riviera in the present day, on 3 September 2020. It was cancelled in December 2020 after only one season.
- In Greece, Ant1 premiered an adaptation on 25 September 2024, called “Grand Hotel”, set in Athens of 1925. The series aired daily, completing a season of 150 episodes, followed by a second season of 136 episodes, which was the last season.
