= ¿A qué estás esperando? =

- Promotional release poster
- Genre: Erotic comedy; Romantic comedy
- Based on: ¿A qué estás esperando? and Tampoco te pido tanto by Megan Maxwell
- Written by: Natalia Durán; Marta Armengol
- Directed by: David Martín-Porras; Salvador García
- Starring: Adriana Torrebejano; Rubén Cortada; Eva Ugarte; Francisco Ortiz
- Music by: Arnau Bataller
- Country of origin: Spain
- Original language: Spanish
- No. of seasons: 1
- No. of episodes: 8

Production
- Cinematography: José Luis Pulido
- Production companies: Buendía Estudios Canarias; Diagonal; DeAPlaneta

Original release
- Network: Atresplayer
- Release: 20 October 2024 – present

¿A qué estás esperando? (lit. 'What Are You Waiting For?') is a Spanish erotic-romantic comedy television series directed by David Martín-Porras and Salvador García and written by Natalia Durán and Marta Armengol starring Adriana Torrebejano, Rubén Cortada, Eva Ugarte, and Francisco Ortiz. It is based on Megan Maxwell's novels ¿A qué estás esperando? and Tampoco te pido tanto.

== Plot ==
The plot follows the relationship between air pilot Can and single mother Sonia and fellow pilot Daryl and flight attendant Carol.

== Cast ==
- Adriana Torrebejano as Sonia
- Rubén Cortada as Can
- Eva Ugarte as Carol
- Francisco Ortiz as Daryl
- Llum Barrera
- Mariano Llorente
- Aria Bedmar
- Ramon Pujol
- Alba Planas
- Pastora Vega
- María de Nati
- Ramón Langa
- Antonia San Juan
- Noa Álvarez
- Manu Baqueiro
- Anna Moliner

== Production ==
The project was announced by Atresmedia in June 2023. The series is based on Megan Maxwell's books Tampoco pido tanto and ¿A qué estás esperando?. Adapted by Natalia Durán, it was written by Durán and Marta Armengol. It is a Buendía Estudios Canarias, Diagonal (Banijay Iberia) and DeAPlaneta production, with the participation of Atresmedia TV. It was shot in the Canary Islands and Madrid.

== Release ==
The series premiered on Atresplayer on 20 October 2024.

== See also ==
- 2024 in Spanish television
