= Cable Girls =

Spanish TV series

- Spanish: Las chicas del cable
- Genre: Period drama; Serial drama; Romance
- Created by: Ramón Campos; Gema R. Neira
- Starring: Blanca Suárez; Maggie Civantos; Nadia de Santiago; Ana María Polvorosa; Ana Fernández García; Martiño Rivas; Concha Velasco; Ángela Cremonte; Yon González; Iria del Río; Borja Luna; Sergio Mur; Nico Romero; Carlos Kaniowsky; Antonio Velázquez; Ernesto Alterio; Luis Fernández; Denisse Peña; Raúl Merida; Miguel Diosdado; Alex Hafner; Valentina Zenere
- Narrated by: Blanca Suárez
- Opening theme: Salt
- Ending theme: My Night
- Country of origin: Spain
- Original language: Spanish
- No. of seasons: 5
- No. of episodes: 42

Production
- Executive producers: Ramón Campos; Gema R. Neira
- Producers: Netflix; Bambú Producciones
- Production location: Spain
- Running time: 35–63 minutes

Original release
- Network: Netflix
- Release: 28 April 2017 – 3 July 2020

Cable Girls (Spanish: Las chicas del cable) is a Spanish period drama television series that ran from April 2017 and concluded in July 2020. Set in the late 1920s, it stars Ana Fernández, Nadia de Santiago, Blanca Suárez and Maggie Civantos.

The first season, consisting of eight episodes, premiered on Netflix, worldwide, on 28 April 2017. The first half of the fifth and final season was released on Netflix, on 14 February 2020. The second half of the fifth and final season was released on Netflix on 3 July 2020.

== Plot ==
In 1928, a modern telecommunications company begins to operate, in Madrid. The series tells of how the lives of four young women change, after they start working for this company, which offers them decent pay and some independence. Each woman has a different reason for joining the company. Alba Romero, who goes by the name Lidia Aguilar, to conceal her identity, seeks a job at the telecommunications company, to complete a mission. Ángeles Vidal is a young mother who works to help provide for her family and is the most experienced switchboard operator at the telecommunications company. Carlota Senillosa wants a job at the telecommunications company, to escape her controlling father and her rigid high society life, and Marga Suarez joins the company to start a new chapter of her life. The four women begin to form a close friendship, and together, they navigate their sentimental lives and their work. The show reveals the hardships that working women faced, in 1920s Spain, and especially the severe restrictions on the rights of Spanish women in a male-dominated society.

== Production ==
Cable Girls was the first Spanish original produced by Netflix, made in collaboration with Bambú Producciones. The idea for the series began with Ramon Campos and Gema R. Neira, who worked together on the screen writing, along with José Rustarazo, Jaime Vaca, Carlos Portela, Almudena Ocaña, Paula Fernández, and Flora González Villanueva.

The series is filmed in Spain's capital, Madrid, in various locations across the city had been given a makeover to transport viewers back to the 1920s. The most prominent locations, in the series, include La Plaza del Alamillo, where the protagonists live, with the Pension Dolores serving as their home, and the street Lope De Vega, serving as their route to work. The series surrounds four women who work at a telecommunications company, a location in the show that required historical accuracy. The scenes in the National Telephone Company, where the women work, are filmed in the Fundacion Telefonica building on Grand Via.

The first season was released, worldwide, on 28 April 2017, and the second season was released on 25 December, of the same year. The third season aired on 7 September 2018, and the fourth season was released on 9 August 2019. The fifth and final season of the series was released in two parts: Part 1 on 14 February 2020 and Part 2 on 3 July 2020.

For the final season Netflix recorded a trailer in the form of a short documentary about the 'last cable girl' of Spain, Magdalena Martín. She operated a manual telecommunications station in Polopos, Granada, until it closed in December 1988.

== Cast ==
Character	Portrayed by	Seasons					
Character	Portrayed by	1	2	3	4	5	
Character	Portrayed by	1	2	3	4	Part 1	Part 2
Main characters
Lidia Aguilar Dávila	Blanca Suárez	Main	Main	Main	Main	Main	Main
Carlota Rodríguez de Senillosa	Ana Fernández	Main	Main	Main	Main	Main	Main
María Inmaculada "Marga" Suárez Pazos	Nadia de Santiago	Main	Main	Main	Main	Main	Main
Ángeles Vidal	Maggie Civantos	Main	Main	Main	Main		Guest
Carlos Cifuentes	Martiño Rivas	Main	Main	Main	Main	Main	
Doña Carmen de Cifuentes	Concha Velasco	Main	Main	Main	Main	Guest	Main
Elisa Cifuentes	Ángela Cremonte	Main	Main	Main	Main		Main
Francisco Gómez	Yon González	Main	Main	Main	Main	Main	Main
Sara Millán (Óscar Ruiz)	Ana Polvorosa	Main	Main	Main	Main	Main	Main
Carolina Moreno	Iria del Río	Main	Main				
Miguel Pascual	Borja Luna	Main	Main	Main	Main		
Mario Pérez	Sergio Mur	Main	Main				
Pablo Santos	Nico Romero	Main	Main	Main	Main	Main	Main
Julio Santos	Nico Romero			Main		Main	Guest
Inspector Beltrán	Carlos Kaniowsky	Main					
Cristóbal Cuevas Moreno	Antonio Velázquez		Main	Main	Main	Main	
Sebastián Uribe	Ernesto Alterio		Main	Main			
Pedro Guzmán	Luis Fernández		Guest	Main			
Sofía Perez Vidal	Denisse Peña					Main	Main
Felipe	Raúl Merida					Main	Main
Isidro	Miguel Diosdado					Main	Main
James Lancaster	Alex Hafner					Main	
Camila	Valentina Zenere						Main
Recurring characters
Ricardo Cifuentes y Navarro	Simón Andreu	Recurring					
Emilio Rodríguez "El Halcón"	Joan Crosas	Recurring		Recurring			
Pilar de Senillosa	Luisa Gavasa	Recurring		Recurring	Recurring		
Dolores "Doña Lola"	Tina Sainz	Recurring	Recurring	Recurring			
Eulalia	María Garralón	Recurring	Recurring				
Victoria	Kiti Mánver	Recurring	Recurring	Recurring	Recurring	Recurring	
Miriam Zafra	Carlota Baró			Recurring			
Lucía	Anna Moliner			Recurring			
Perla	Patricia Peñalver			Recurring			
Antonio Castro	Cristóbal Suárez				Recurring		
Sergio Andrade	Carles Francino				Recurring		
Gregorio Díaz	Juan Carlos Vellido				Recurring		
Magdalena	Lucía Perlado				Recurring		

== Episodes ==
Series	Episodes		Originally released
1	8		28 April 2017
2	8		25 December 2017
3	8		7 September 2018
4	8		9 August 2019
5	10	5	14 February 2020
5	10	5	3 July 2020

=== Season 1 (2017) ===
No. overall	No. in season	English title	Spanish title	Directed by	Written by	Original release date
1	1	"Chapter 1: Dreams"	Capítulo 1: "Los sueños"	Carlos Sedes	Story by : Ramón Campos, Gema R. Neira, Teresa Fernández-Valdés & María José Rustarazo; Teleplay by : Ramón Campos & Gema R. Neira	28 April 2017
In 1928 Madrid a young woman named Alba with dreams of living a new life in Argentina is wrongfully accused of murder. A corrupt police officer agrees to let her go if she pulls off a heist for him at the telephone exchange.
2	2	"Chapter 2: Memories"	Capítulo 2: "Los recuerdos"	Carlos Sedes	Story by : Ramón Campos, Gema R. Neira, Teresa Fernández-Valdés, María José Rustarazo & Almudena Ocaña; Teleplay by : Gema R. Neira, María José Rustarazo & Jaime Vaca	28 April 2017
Francisco makes a deal with Lidia. Marga is worried about what she saw at the party, and Carlota's father interferes in her life.
3	3	"Chapter 3: Lies"	Capítulo 3: "Las mentiras"	David Pinillos	Story by : Ramón Campos, Gema R. Neira, Teresa Fernández-Valdés, María José Rustarazo & Almudena Ocaña; Teleplay by : Carlos Portela & María José Rustarazo	28 April 2017
The Police are called in when Lidia's identity is questioned. Francisco's wife is suspicious and asks Carolina for help.
4	4	"Chapter 4: Feelings"	Capítulo 4: "Los sentimientos"	David Pinillos	Story by : Ramón Campos, Gema R. Neira, Teresa Fernández-Valdés & María José Rustarazo; Teleplay by : Carlos Portela	28 April 2017
Marga has a lunch date with Pablo. Angeles finds out more about Mario's infidelity.
5	5	"Chapter 5: The Past"	Capítulo 5: "El pasado"	Carlos Sedes	Story by : Ramón Campos, Gema R. Neira, Teresa Fernández-Valdés, María José Rustarazo & Jaime Vaca; Teleplay by : Carlos Portela	28 April 2017
Carolina threatens to reveal Lidia's true identity. Miguel tells Carlota to make a decision about their relationship. Everything changes for Ángeles.
6	6	"Chapter 6: Family"	Capítulo 6: "La familia"	Carlos Sedes	Story by : Ramón Campos, Gema R. Neira, Teresa Fernández-Valdés, María José Rustarazo & Jaime Vaca; Teleplay by : Estíbaliz Burgaleta & María José Rustarazo	28 April 2017
Lidia helps Ángeles with her escape from town. Carlota works for Sara to get out of prison. Carlos has a fight with his father, with tragic consequences.
7	7	"Chapter 7: Loss"	Capítulo 7: "La pérdida"	David Pinillos	Story by : Ramón Campos, Gema R. Neira, Teresa Fernández-Valdés, María José Rustarazo & Jaime Vaca; Teleplay by : Carlos Portela, María José Rustarazo & Jaime Vaca	28 April 2017
The Cifuentes family mourns their recent loss. Lidia has to be honest with Carlos and tells him who she really is.
8	8	"Chapter 8: Love"	Capítulo 8: "El amor"	David Pinillos	Story by : Ramón Campos, Gema R. Neira, Teresa Fernández-Valdés, María José Rustarazo, Jaime Vaca & Carlos Portela; Teleplay by : Carlos Portela & Jaime Vaca	28 April 2017
New technology from the rotary divides Lidia's loyalty when she must make a choice between Carlos and her friends.

=== Season 2 (2017) ===
No. overall	No. in season	English title	Spanish title	Directed by	Written by	Original release date
9	1	"Chapter 9: The Choice"	Capítulo 9: "La elección"	Carlos Sedes	Ramón Campos, Gema R. Neira, Teresa Fernández-Valdez, Maria José Rustarazo, Carlos Portela, Jaime Vaca, Flora Gonzáles Villanueva & Paula Fernández	25 December 2017
As 1928 turns into 1929, Lidia reports to a new boss, Carlota is blackmailed, Marga gets a hidden surprise, and all three rush to Angeles's rescue.
10	2	"Chapter 10: The Pact"	Capítulo 10: "El pacto"	Carlos Sedes	Story by : Ramón Campos, Gema R. Neira, Teresa Fernández-Valdez, Maria José Rustarazo, Carlos Portela, Jaime Vaca, Flora Gonzáles Villanueva & Paula Fernández; Teleplay by : Almudena Ocaña	25 December 2017
Lidia directs a cover-up plan, but a theft complicates things and Marga is caught in a lie. Carlos and Francisco negotiate an alliance.
11	3	"Chapter 11: Jealousy"	Capítulo 11: "Los celos"	Antonio Hernández	Story by : Ramón Campos, Gema R. Neira, Teresa Fernández-Valdez, Maria José Rustarazo, Flora Gonzáles Villanueva & Paula Fernández; Teleplay by : Almudena Ocaña	25 December 2017
Marisol tries to separate Marga and Pablo. Sara awakens Carlota's suspicion. Lidia sees a decisive difference between Carlos and Francisco.
12	4	"Chapter 12: Guilt"	Capítulo 12: "La culpa"	Antonio Hernández	Story by : Ramón Campos, Gema R. Neira, Teresa Fernández-Valdez, Maria José Rustarazo, Flora Gonzáles Villanueva & Paula Fernández; Teleplay by : Flora Gonzáles Villanueva, Paula Fernández & Maria José Rustarazo	25 December 2017
Sara reveals a secret to Carlota. Angeles learns Inspector Cuevas's weakness. Pablo shows Marga his undying love. Lidia helps end an operator strike.
13	5	"Chapter 13: Secrets"	Capítulo 13: "Los secretos"	Roger Gual	Story by : Ramón Campos, Gema R. Neira, Teresa Fernández-Valdez, Maria José Rustarazo, Flora Gonzáles Villanueva & Paula Fernández; Teleplay by : Almudena Ocaña & Maria José Rustarazo	25 December 2017
Sara seeks medical advice. Lidia gets news that complicates her choice between Francisco and Carlos. Marga learns Pablo is hiding a delicate problem.
14	6	"Chapter 14: Loneliness"	Capítulo 14: "La soledad"	Roger Gual	Story by : Ramón Campos, Gema R. Neira, Teresa Fernández-Valdez, Maria José Rustarazo, Flora Gonzáles Villanueva & Paula Fernández; Teleplay by : Flora Gonzáles Villanueva, Paula Fernández & Maria José Rustarazo	25 December 2017
Lidia gets a tempting offer. Carlota and her friends respond to a plea for help. Angeles takes a risky step in order to learn the witness's identity.
15	7	"Chapter 15: Opportunities"	Capítulo 15: "Las oportunidades"	David Pinillos	Story by : Ramón Campos, Gema R. Neira, Teresa Fernández-Valdez, Maria José Rustarazo, Flora Gonzáles Villanueva & Paula Fernández; Teleplay by : Maria José Rustarazo, Flora Gonzáles Villanueva & Paula Fernández	25 December 2017
The police find a body. Ángeles learns who's been spooking her. Francisco gives Lidia space, while Carlos gives her a surprise. An arrest is made.
16	8	"Chapter 16: Innocence"	Capítulo 16: "La inocencia"	David Pinillos	Story by : Ramón Campos, Gema R. Neira, Teresa Fernández-Valdez, Maria José Rustarazo, Flora Gonzáles Villanueva & Paula Fernández; Teleplay by : Almudena Ocaña, Teresa Fernández-Valdez, Flora Gonzáles Villanueva & Paula Fernández	25 December 2017
Carlota gets news about Miguel. Guilt-stricken Marga goes into seclusion. Lidia learns Francisco has made a decision. Ángeles finds herself cornered.

=== Season 3 (2018) ===
No. overall	No. in season	English title	Spanish title	Directed by	Written by	Original release date
17	1	"Chapter 17: Time"	Capítulo 17: "El tiempo"	Roger Gual	Story by : Ramón Campos, Gema R. Neira, Teresa Fernández-Valdez, Maria José Rustarazo, Flora Gonzáles Villanueva & Paula Fernández; Teleplay by : Almudena Ocaña, Paula Fernández, Maria José Rustarazo & Flora Gonzáles Villanueva	7 September 2018
Six months later, a catastrophic event deeply affects Lidia, Marga, Carlota, Ángeles and their loved ones. Marga gets a surprise visit from an in-law.
18	2	"Chapter 18: Death"	Capítulo 18: "La muerte"	Roger Gual	Story by : Ramón Campos, Gema R. Neira, Teresa Fernández-Valdez, Maria José Rustarazo, Flora Gonzáles Villanueva & Alberto Grondona; Teleplay by : Almudena Ocaña, Maria José Rustarazo, Flora Gonzáles Villanueva & Alberto Grondona	7 September 2018
With her friends' help, Lidia puts her plan into action. Carlota decides what to do with her inheritance. Ángeles tries to earn Pedro Guzmán's trust.
19	3	"Chapter 19: Truth"	Capítulo 19: "La verdad"	Antonio Hernández	Story by : Ramón Campos, Gema R. Neira, Teresa Fernández-Valdez, Maria José Rustarazo, Flora Gonzáles Villanueva & Alberto Grondona; Teleplay by : Estíbaliz Burgaleta & Maria José Rustarazo	7 September 2018
Lidia's desperation worries Carlos and spurs Francisco to offer support. Marga helps Julio cover Pablo's job. Carlota finds a way to promote her cause.
20	4	"Chapter 20: Revenge"	Capítulo 20: "La venganza"	Antonio Hernández	Story by : Ramón Campos, Gema R. Neira, Teresa Fernández-Valdez, Maria José Rustarazo, Flora Gonzáles Villanueva & Alberto Grondona; Teleplay by : Estíbaliz Burgaleta & Maria José Rustarazo	7 September 2018
Lidia and Francisco visit an orphanage to gather info. Complications arise with Marga when Julio impersonates housebound Pablo, who sneaks back to work.
21	5	"Chapter 21: Sin"	Capítulo 21: "El pecado"	Carlos Sedes	Story by : Ramón Campos, Gema R. Neira, Teresa Fernández-Valdez, Maria José Rustarazo, Flora Gonzáles Villanueva & Alberto Grondona; Teleplay by : Almudena Ocaña	7 September 2018
Ángeles must deflect Guzmán's suspicion of a mole. Carlos learns his mother's car was sabotaged and confronts Lidia. Marga has a horrible realization.
22	6	"Chapter 22: Fight"	Capítulo 22: "La lucha"	Carlos Sedes	Story by : Ramón Campos, Gema R. Neira, Teresa Fernández-Valdez, Maria José Rustarazo, Flora Gonzáles Villanueva & Paula Fernández; Teleplay by : Estíbaliz Burgaleta & Maria José Rustarazo	7 September 2018
To protect her child, Ángeles accepts a deal with Guzmán. A phone call gives Lidia a hunch on Eva's whereabouts. Carlota responds to her attackers.
23	7	"Chapter 23: Hope"	Capítulo 23: "La esperanza"	Roger Gual	Story by : Ramón Campos, Gema R. Neira, Teresa Fernández-Valdez, Maria José Rustarazo, Flora Gonzáles Villanueva & Alberto Grondona; Teleplay by : Maria José Rustarazo, Flora Gonzáles Villanueva & Alberto Grondona	7 September 2018
Lidia turns the tables on her captor. During the king's visit, those fighting for Carlota's cause take drastic measures, forcing her to choose sides.
24	8	"Chapter 24: Destiny"	Capítulo 24: "El destino"	Roger Gual	Story by : Ramón Campos, Gema R. Neira, Teresa Fernández-Valdez, Maria José Rustarazo, Flora Gonzáles Villanueva & Alberto Grondona; Teleplay by : Maria José Rustarazo, Flora Gonzales Villanueva & Alberto Grondona	7 September 2018
As the situation escalates, Lidia tries to get to Eva, Marga shocks Pablo, Carlota takes a risk, Ángeles learns a truth and Francisco attempts a rescue.

=== Season 4 (2019) ===
No. overall	No. in season	English title	Spanish title	Directed by	Written by	Original release date
25	1	"Chapter 25: Equality"	Capítulo 25: "La igualdad"	Antonio Hernández	Story by : Ramón Campos, Gema R. Neira, Teresa Fernández-Valdez, Maria José Rustarazo, Flora Gonzáles Villanueva & Alberto Grondona; Teleplay by : Maria José Rustarazo, Flora Gonzáles Villanueva & Alberto Grondona	9 August 2019
Carlota's new political career faces a major obstacle as Marga suffers heartbreak. Meanwhile, Lidia returns to work and Angeles pitches an idea to her.
26	2	"Chapter 26: Liberty"	Capítulo 26: "La libertad"	Antonio Hernández	Story by : Ramón Campos, Gema R. Neira, Teresa Fernández-Valdez, Maria José Rustarazo, Flora Gonzáles Villanueva & Alberto Grondona; Teleplay by : Maria José Rustarazo, Flora Gonzáles Villanueva & Alberto Grondona	9 August 2019
As her memory starts to slowly come back, Carlota's friends try to clear her name. Angeles begins teaching classes. Lidia's former enemy returns.
27	3	"Chapter 27: Justice"	Capítulo 27: "La justicia"	Roger Gual	Story by : Ramón Campos, Gema R. Neira, Teresa Fernández-Valdez, Maria José Rustarazo, Flora Gonzáles Villanueva & Alberto Grondona; Teleplay by : Maria José Rustarazo, Alberto Grondona & Estabaliz Burgaleta	9 August 2019
Lidia and Carlos argue over a loved one's medical treatment. Óscar makes a shocking discovery about Dulce. Marga gets to know her boss better.
28	4	"Chapter 28: Fear"	Capítulo 28: "El miedo"	Roger Gual	Story by : Ramón Campos, Gema R. Neira, Teresa Fernández-Valdez, Maria José Rustarazo, Flora Gonzáles Villanueva & Alberto Grondona; Teleplay by : Maria José Rustarazo, Alberto Grondona, Estabaliz Burgaleta & Teresa Fernández-Valdez	9 August 2019
With Carlota's future looking perilous, Óscar starts falsifying evidence to get her out of prison. A different doctor gives Lidia new hope.
29	5	"Chapter 29: Life"	Capítulo 29: "La vida"	Antonio Hernández	Story by : Ramón Campos, Gema R. Neira, Teresa Fernández-Valdez, Maria José Rustarazo, Flora Gonzáles Villanueva & Alberto Grondona; Teleplay by : Maria José Rustarazo, Flora Gonzáles Villanueva, Alberto Grondona & Estabaliz Burgaleta	9 August 2019
The friends begin concocting a plan to free Óscar from prison and Marga turns to Pablo for assistance. Carlos is surprised by his friend's condition.
30	6	"Chapter 30: Doubt"	Capítulo 30: "La duda"	Antonio Hernández	Story by : Ramón Campos, Gema R. Neira, Teresa Fernández-Valdez, Maria José Rustarazo, Flora Gonzáles Villanueva & Alberto Grondona; Teleplay by : Maria José Rustarazo, Flora Gonzáles Villanueva, Alberto Grondona & Almudena Ocaña	9 August 2019
Carmen creates a deception while Carlos continues to keep Lidia in the dark. Carlota tries desperately to escape from her captor.
31	7	"Chapter 31: Happiness"	Capítulo 31: "La felicidad"	Roger Gual	Story by : Ramón Campos, Gema R. Neira, Teresa Fernández-Valdez, Maria José Rustarazo, Flora Gonzáles Villanueva & Alberto Grondona; Teleplay by : Maria José Rustarazo, Flora Gonzáles Villanueva, Alberto Grondona & Estabaliz Burgaleta	9 August 2019
Lidia is confused and hurt by Carlos's betrayal. An unlikely ally is enlisted to try to free Óscar. Carmen's calculating plan starts falling into place.
32	8	"Chapter 32: Luck"	Capítulo 32: "La suerte"	Roger Gual	Story by : Ramón Campos, Gema R. Neira, Teresa Fernández-Valdez, Maria José Rustarazo, Flora Gonzáles Villanueva & Alberto Grondona; Teleplay by : Maria José Rustarazo, Flora Gonzáles Villanueva, Alberto Grondona & Estabaliz Burgaleta	9 August 2019
When the prison break is set in motion, the team faces unforeseen consequences. Lidia makes a heartbreaking decision in order to protect Eva.

=== Season 5 (2020) ===
No. overall	No. in season	Title	Spanish title	Directed by	Written by	Original release date
Part 1
33	1	"Chapter 33: War"	Capítulo 33: La guerra	Antonio Hernández	Story by : Teresa Fernández-Valdez, Maria José Rustarazo, Flora Gonzáles Villanueva & Alberto Grondona; Teleplay by : Estabaliz Burgaleta, Flora Gonzáles Villanueva, Alberto Grondona & Maria José Rustarazo	14 February 2020
Lidia leaves New York and returns to Madrid in search of Sofía, who has run away to join the Republicans in the Spanish Civil War.
34	2	"Chapter 34: Hate"	Capítulo 34: El odio	Antonio Hernández	Story by : Teresa Fernández-Valdez, Maria José Rustarazo, Flora Gonzáles Villanueva & Alberto Grondona; Teleplay by : Flora Gonzáles Villanueva, Alberto Grondona, Paula Fernández, Curro Serrano & Javier Chacáretegui	14 February 2020
Lidia's friends - both old and new - help her attempt to force Carlos to call Sofía back from the front lines. Pablo looks for ways to avoid enlisting.
35	3	"Chapter 35: Courage"	Capítulo 35: El valor	Antonio Hernández	Story by : Teresa Fernández-Valdez, Maria José Rustarazo & Flora Gonzáles Villanueva; Teleplay by : Flora Gonzáles Villanueva & Maria José Rustarazo	14 February 2020
Óscar and Carlota risk their journalistic integrity in exchange for helping Lidia with Sofía. Marga falls ill while running a dangerous errand.
36	4	"Chapter 36: Control"	Capítulo 36: El control	Manuel Gómez Pereira	Story by : Teresa Fernández-Valdez, Maria José Rustarazo, Flora Gonzáles Villanueva & Fran Navarro; Teleplay by : Flora Gonzáles Villanueva, Fran Navarro & Maria José Rustarazo	14 February 2020
Carlos and Lidia encounter trouble in their search for Sofía. Carlota visits the western front with James, to Óscar's chagrin. Pablo goes missing.
37	5	"Chapter 37: Insanity"	Capítulo 37: La locura	Antonio Hernández	Story by : Teresa Fernández-Valdez, Maria José Rustarazo, Flora Gonzáles Villanueva & Fran Navarro; Teleplay by : Flora Gonzáles Villanueva, Fran Navarro & Maria José Rustarazo	14 February 2020
When Madrid falls to the Nationalists, Lidia and most of her friends must face widespread grief and devastation, with long-term consequences.
Part 2
38	6	"Chapter 38: Power"	Capítulo 38: El poder	Antonio Hernández	Story by : Teresa Fernández-Valdez, Maria José Rustarazo, Flora Gonzáles Villanueva & Fran Navarro; Teleplay by : Flora Gonzáles Villanueva, Carlos Portela, Paula Fernández, Maria José Rustarazo	3 July 2020
Lidia's defiance gets her into trouble at the prison camp, while Francisco concocts a plan to free her. Marga confides her secrets to Isidro.
39	7	"Chapter 39: Patience"	Capítulo 39: La paciencia	Antonio Hernández	Story by : Teresa Fernández-Valdez, Maria José Rustarazo, Flora Gonzáles Villanueva & Fran Navarro; Teleplay by : Maria José Rustarazo, Flora Gonzáles Villanueva, Fran Navarro	3 July 2020
Lidia is desperate to save her imprisoned friend. Elisa discloses Carlos' fate. Marga realises who betrayed her. Carmen targets Lidia's loved ones.
40	8	"Chapter 40: Pain"	Capítulo 40: El dolor	Gustavo Ron	Story by : Teresa Fernández-Valdez, Maria José Rustarazo, Flora Gonzáles Villanueva & Fran Navarro; Teleplay by : Maria José Rustarazo, Flora Gonzáles Villanueva, Fran Navarro	3 July 2020
Elisa reveals a startling secret as more of Lidia's friends are endangered. Sofía turns to an old friend for help protecting the prisoners from Carmen.
41	9	"Chapter 41: Defeat"	Capítulo 41: La derrota	Gustavo Ron	Story by : Teresa Fernández-Valdez, Maria José Rustarazo, Flora Gonzáles Villanueva & Fran Navarro; Teleplay by : Maria José Rustarazo, Flora Gonzáles Villanueva, Fran Navarro	3 July 2020
An unexpected ally seeking the ultimate revenge helps Lidia try and enact her plan to free all the prisoners from the women's prison camp.
42	10	"Chapter 42: The End"	Capítulo 42: El Final	Carlos Sedes	Story by : Teresa Fernández-Valdez, Maria José Rustarazo, Flora Gonzáles Villanueva & Fran Navarro; Teleplay by : Maria José Rustarazo, Flora Gonzáles Villanueva, Fran Navarro	3 July 2020
When the final phase of their escape plan is threatened, Lidia, Carlota, Marga and Óscar make a momentous decision together.

== Awards and nominations ==
Year	Award	Category	Nominee(s)	Result	Ref.
2017	64th Ondas Awards	Best Fiction Web Series or Online Show		Won	
2017	4th Fénix Awards	Best Drama Series		Nominated	
2018	5th Feroz Awards	Best Supporting Actress (TV)	Ana Polvorosa	Nominated	
2018	27th Actors and Actresses Union Awards	Best Supporting Actress (TV)	Ana Polvorosa	Won	
2018	5th Platino Awards	Best Ibero-American Miniseries or TV Series		Nominated	
2018	5th Platino Awards	Best Actress in a Miniseries or TV Series	Blanca Suárez	Won	
2018	29th GLAAD Media Awards	Outstanding Scripted Television Series (Spanish-language)		Won	
