= Carlota Baró =

Spanish actress

- Born: Carlota Baró Riau; 12 March 1989 (age 37); Barcelona, Spain
- Occupation: Actress
- Years active: 2011–present
- Partner: Francisco Ortiz

Carlota Baró Riau (born 12 March 1989) is a Spanish actress, known mainly for her appearance in the series El secreto del Puente Viejo and Amar es para siempre.

== Biography ==
She studied classical dance for fifteen years in different schools in Barcelona, where she was born (Ramón Soler Schools, Company and Company, Mar Estudio, and with José Manuel Rodríguez and Esmeralda Maycas) and trained as an actress with Esteve Rovira and in the school of Nancy Tuñón and Jordi Oliver.

In 2006 she worked in the spot Talla amb els mals rotllos, directed by Isabel Coixet for a campaign of the Generalitat de Catalunya against gender violence.

In 2008 and 2009, she worked in the theater in plays such as Romeo y Julieta, Viejos tiempos and La importancia de llamarse Ernesto.

In mid-2011, while combining theater with her studies in Art History, she had the opportunity to debut on television with the role of Mariana Castañeda in El secreto de Puente Viejo, one of the main characters of the series, remaining for five years and participating in 1,340 episodes.

In 2015 she starred in Los vencejos no sonríen, written and directed by Carlos Silveira, alongside actor Francisco Ortiz.

In 2017 she taught a dance course for actors at the Centro de Investigación Teatral La Manada.

Between 2018 and 2020 she played Lucía García-Saavedra in the comedy Fin de engaño, directed by Darío Frías and written by Luis Sánchez-Polack.

Following the release of the third season of Las chicas del cable, her signing for the series was revealed.

Between 2021 and 2022 she played the role of Coral / Leo in the 10th season of Amar es para siempre.

== Television ==
Year	Title	Character	Channel	Duration
2011-2016	El secreto de Puente Viejo	Mariana Castañeda Pacheco	Antena 3	1.340 episodes
2018	Las chicas del cable	Miriam Expósito	Netflix	4 episodes
2021-2022	Amar es para siempre	Coral / Leo Lozano	Antena 3	253 episodes

== Theater ==
- 2008: Romeo y Julieta.
- 2009: Viejos tiempos y La importancia de llamarse Ernesto.
- La importancia de llamarse Ernesto.
- 2015: Los vencejos no sonríen.
- 2018-2020: Fin de engaño.

== Short films ==
- 2008: Caída (ESAC).

== Advertising ==
- 2006: Talla amb els mals rotllos.
