= Amaia Salamanca =

Spanish actress (born 1986)

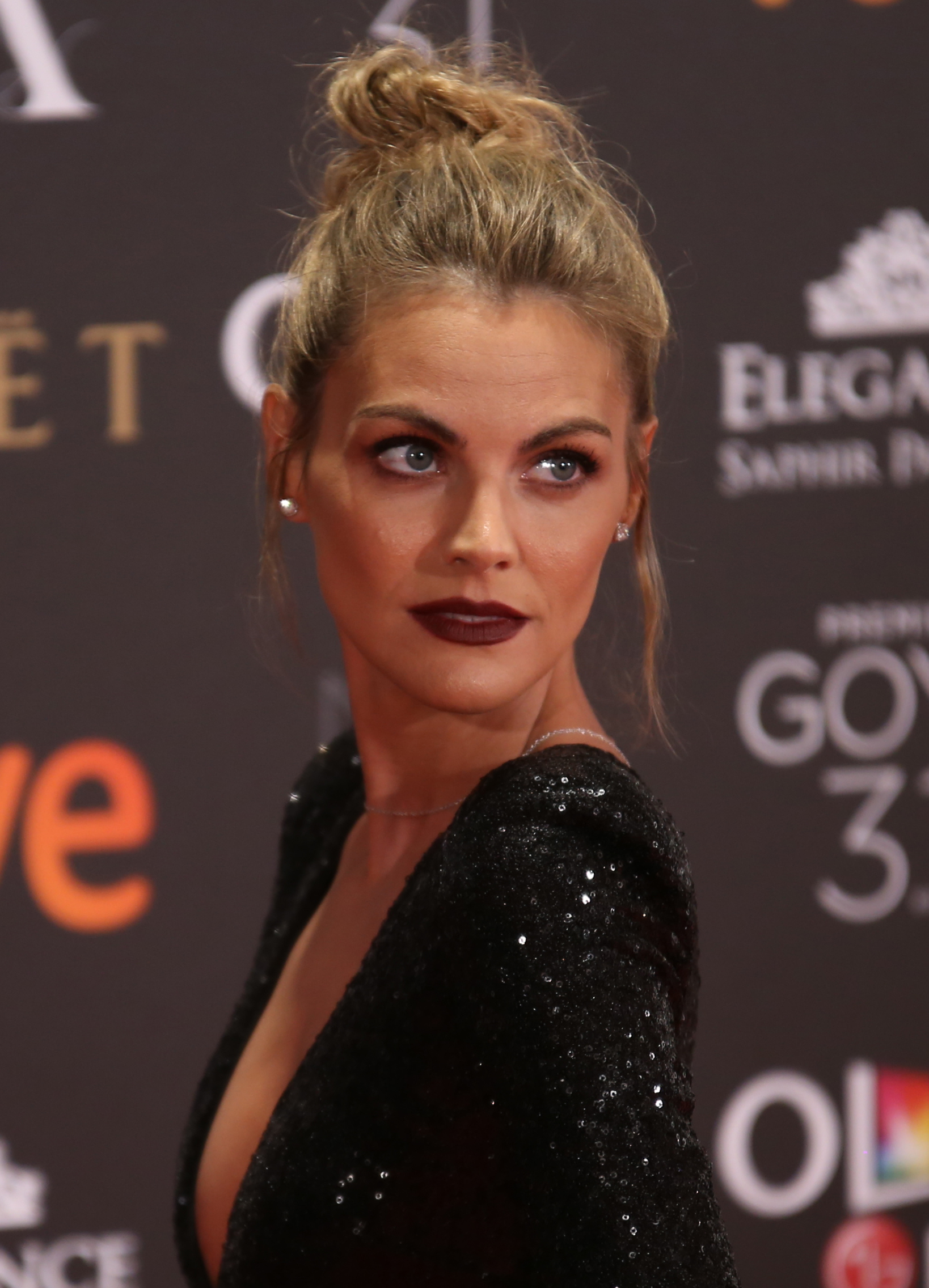
- Born: Amaia Salamanca Urízar; 28 March 1986 (age 40); Coslada, Community of Madrid, Spain
- Occupation: Actress
- Height: 1.67 m (5 ft 5.75 in)

Amaia Salamanca Urízar (born 28 March 1986) is a Spanish actress, best known for her role as Catalina Marcos in the Spanish version of the Colombian TV series Sin tetas no hay paraíso and as Alicia Alarcón in series Gran Hotel.

== Biography ==
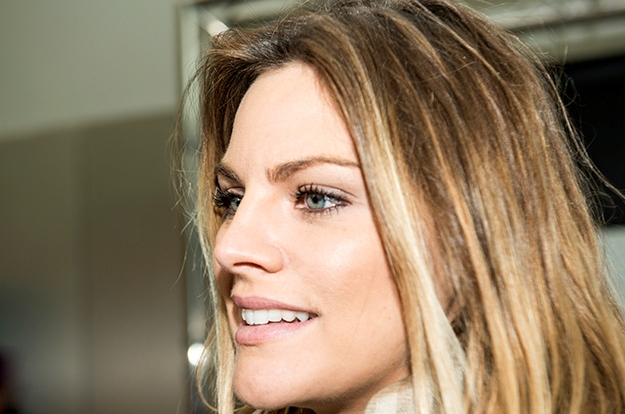
Amaia Salamanca in November 2013

Amaia Salamanca was born in Coslada on 28 March 1986. Initially, she was not planning to go into acting, but in her first audition, for SMS, the television channel TV company LaSexta gave her first acting job. In SMS, she worked with other young film and television actors such as Yon González, Aroa Gimeno, Mario Casas and María Castro.

Besides her work as an actress, Amaia works as a model for photo shoots, video clips and shows.

== Career ==
She made a theater debut in 2009 with The Marquise of O, by Heinrich von Kleist. In 2010, she played Letizia Ortiz in the TV movie Felipe y Letizia.

== In the media ==
In October 2020, Salamanca became an ambassador for Codorníu and the protagonist of its new campaign 'Live to celebrate'.

== Filmography ==
Television
Year	Title	Role	Notes	Ref.
2006–07	SMS: Sin Miedo a Soñar	Paula	185 episodes	
2007	Los hombres de Paco	Cristina	Guest. Season 4	
2008–09	Sin tetas no hay paraíso	Catalina Marcos Ruiz		
2009	No estás sola, Sara	Sara	TV movie	
2010	Felipe y Letizia	Letizia Ortiz	TV movie aired as a two-part miniseries	
2011–13	Gran Hotel	Alicia Alarcón		
2014–15	Velvet	Bárbara de Senillosa		
2016	La embajada	Fátima		
2017	Velvet Colección	Bárbara de Senillosa	Reprise of role in Velvet	
2017	Tiempos de guerra (Morocco: Love in Times of War)	Julia Ballester		
2022–present	Todos mienten	Sofía		
2022–23	Bienvenidos a Edén (Welcome to Eden)	Astrid		
2022	Dos años y un día	Verónica		

Film
Year	Title	Role	Notes	Ref.
2009	Fuga de cerebros (Brain Drain)	Natalia		
2010	Tensión sexual no resuelta	Rebeca		
2011	XP3D (Paranormal Xperience 3D)	Ángela		
2012	¡Atraco! (Hold-Up!)	Teresa		
2016	Nuestros amantes (Our Lovers)	María		
2018	Perdida	Nadine		
2019	A pesar de todo (Despite Everything)	Sofía		
2019	Lo dejo cuando quiera (I Can Quit Whenever I Want)	Gloria		
2022	La piel del tambor (The Man from Rome)	Macarena Bruner		
2025	Siempre es invierno † (Always Winter)	Marta		

== Theatre ==
- 2009 The Marquise of O (Debut)

== Accolades ==
Year	Award	Category	Work	Result	Ref.
2010	19th Actors and Actresses Union Awards	Best New Actress	Sin tetas no hay paraíso	Nominated	
