= Bajo sospecha =

2015 Spanish television series

- Genre: Crime drama Serial drama
- Starring: Yon González; Blanca Romero; Lluís Homar
- Country of origin: Spain
- Original language: Spanish
- No. of seasons: 2
- No. of episodes: 18

Production
- Running time: 70 minutes approx.
- Production companies: Bambú Producciones; Atresmedia

Original release
- Network: Antena 3
- Release: February 17, 2015 – March 17, 2016

Bajo sospecha (Spanish: Under suspicion) is a Spanish crime drama television series produced by Bambú Producciones for Atresmedia. It airs on Atresmedia's main channel Antena 3. The first season was initially planned to have 10 episodes, but about 20% of the filmed scenes were edited out to reduce the number to 8. The first season revolved around an investigation by undercover police officers Víctor Reyes (Yon González) and Laura Cortés (Blanca Romero), alongside their superior, Superintendent Casas (Lluís Homar). In May 2015, it was confirmed that the series would have a second season, centered on a different investigation, in which Yon González and Lluís Homar would reprise their roles, with Olivia Molina playing the new main female character.

== Plot ==
=== Season one ===
In the small town of Cienfuegos, 7-year-old Alicia Vega (Aroa Palacios) and her family attend her First Communion. However, Alicia goes missing when they are celebrating at the family's restaurant, closed for the occasion.

After two weeks of search, the police only knows one thing: the culprit is one of the people invited to the ceremony. Undercover agents Víctor and Laura arrive in Cienfuegos pretending to be a married couple to infiltrate the surroundings of the Vega family and the rest of suspects.

=== Season two ===
The Montalbán Polyclinic Hospital lies just outside Madrid. At the hospital, the strange disappearance of a young French resident is followed by the murder of the chief nurse. Víctor will have to go undercover on the hospital without much evidence to solve the crimes. Only the surveillance video record where the kidnapping of one of the women can be seen. What Víctor, Casas and Vidal (Vicente Romero) do know is that the culprit is an employee of the hospital, and because of it the best way to know is going undercover.

The fact that the disappeared girl is a French citizen will cause the arrival of a French Police inspector and an agent (Mar Sodupe and Hugo Becker) who will go undercover along with Víctor in a complicated police collaboration: frictions are frequent due to the different procedures and ways of seeing the investigation.

== Episodes ==
=== Season 1 ===
No. overall	No. in season	Title	Directed by	Original release date	Viewers (millions)
1	1	"La comunión"	Silvia Quer	February 17, 2015	4.216 (21.6%)
The Vega family is getting ready to celebrate the First Communion of twin children Alicia and Pablo. The ceremony takes place at the family's restaurant, and everything runs smoothly until they decide to take a picture to immortalize the moment and Alicia is nowhere to be found.
2	2	"El vestido"	Silvia Quer	February 24, 2015	3.909 (19.6%)
Two weeks after Alicia's disappearance, no significant progress has been made in the investigation until Víctor finds out something plugged one of the restaurant's wine vats. A finding that points directly at Alicia's aunt, Begoña Valverde, as a suspect, since she was tasked with looking for her in the cellar.
3	3	"La cabaña"	Silvia Quer & Jorge Sánchez-Cabezudo	March 3, 2015	3.947 (21.4%)
As Alicia has been found and remains in hospital torn between life and death, Andrés is under arrest and seems to be the prime suspect until a search at Bosco's house uncovers a shrine with objects of her.
4	4	"El vídeo de comunión"	Jorge Sánchez-Cabezudo	March 10, 2015	3.526 (18.7%)
Begoña is back on top of the suspects list after the police discovers Alicia's diary, where she wrote her aunt had threatened her. But no definitive clue has been found yet.
5	5	"Nuria"	Silvia Quer & Jorge Sánchez-Cabezudo	March 17, 2015	3.333 (17.2%)
Carmen is convinced that Nuria knows something about what happened to Alicia and tries to get a confession from her behind her mother's back.
6	6	"Mamá"	Silvia Quer & Jorge Sánchez-Cabezudo	March 23, 2015	3.891 (19.9%)
The police continues searching for Nuria, although the blood found in the house is not a good sign. Besides, Víctor and Laura determine Eduardo and Carmen are somehow involved in the disappearance.
7	7	"La linterna"	Silvia Quer & Jorge Sánchez-Cabezudo	April 6, 2015	3.43 (18.5%)
After her father's arrest, Emi manages to run away from Víctor and Laura and asks Óscar for help to get out of Cienfuegos.
8	8	"La verdad"	Silvia Quer & Ramón Campos	April 13, 2015	3.748 (20.4%)
The police finally interrogates Emi and reconstructs the events with the help of her testimony.

=== Season 2 ===
No. overall	No. in season	Title	Directed by	Original release date	Viewers (millions)
9	1	"La llave"	Jorge Torregrossa	January 12, 2016	3.222 (17.5%)
Catherine Le Monnier, a young French doctor working as a resident at the Montalbán Polyclinic Hospital, goes missing without a trace. Just two weeks later, the chief nurse of the same hospital is murdered, which causes alarm: a killer is on the loose. Víctor is sent undercover as a paramedic to investigate the case.
10	2	"El oso"	Jorge Torregrossa	January 19, 2016	3.162 (18%)
The discovery of the lifeless body of Isabel Freire, the hospital's chief nurse, brings out the first secrets of the staff: forbidden relationships, professional differences and a betrayal that the victim's husband claimed not to know. Víctor, with the unexpected help of undercover French agent Alain, is out to find the culprit... and the whereabouts of another missing woman.
11	3	"Sara"	Miguel Conde	January 26, 2016	3.02 (17.2%)
Sara Guzmán is found alive and the agents hope her testimony will help them get closer to finding Catherine Le Monnier. Meanwhile, Ginés, the orderly, insists in defending his innocence, but he hides something that could ruin the hospital's reputation.
12	4	"El teléfono"	Miguel Conde	February 2, 2016	2.893 (16.9%)
Víctor is assaulted by the killer, but fails to uncover their identity. What he does find is the substance the killer uses to drug their victims. Also, in the assault, he has lost his cellphone. Someone in the hospital has it, will not return it and knows Víctor is an undercover agent.
13	5	"El horno"	Jorge Torregrossa	February 9, 2016	3.088 (17.3%)
An employee of Montalbán has discovered Víctor's true identity, which means he might be withdrawn from the investigation. Meanwhile, Sara Guzmán wakes from her coma and evidence is found that Enrique Méndez was murdered in the hospital.
14	6	"La cartera"	Jorge Torregrossa	February 16, 2016	2.820 (16%)
Víctor and Vidal have made a mistake that has caused another setback for the investigation, and the French agents are starting to question the professionalism of their Spanish counterparts.
15	7	"Rafi"	Miguel Conde	February 25, 2016	2.489 (13.6%)
Chief nurse Lidia Abad pleads guilty after being arrested, but Casas and his men are not convinced. Meanwhile, Sophie and Alain investigate Adela and Marcos, who are hiding something in a place they call "the garden".
16	8	"Catherine"	Miguel Conde	March 3, 2016	2.310 (12.8%)
.
17	9	"El jardín"	Jorge Torregrossa	March 10, 2016	2.483 (14.1%)
.
18	10	"La confesión"	Jorge Torregrossa	March 17, 2016	2.566 (14.9%)
.
