= María Concepción García Gainza =

Spanish art historian and educator (1937–2026)

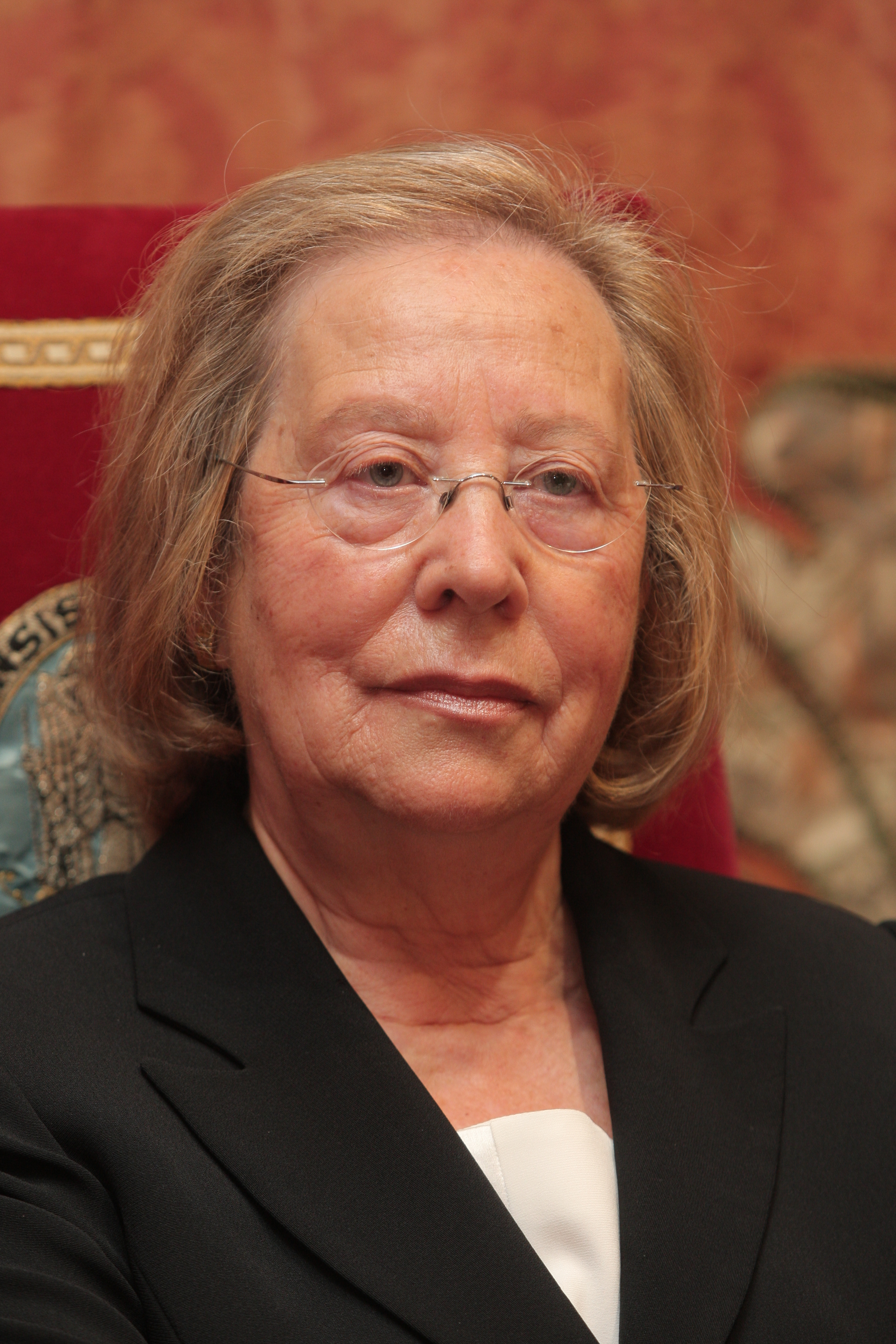
- Born: 1 December 1937; Pamplona, Spain
- Died: 17 November 2026 (aged 88); Pamplona, Spain
- Education: University of Navarra; University of Zaragoza
- Occupation: Professor of Art History
- Employer(s): University of Seville; University of Murcia; University of Navarra

María Concepción García Gainza (1 December 1937 – 17 November 2026) was a Spanish art historian, educator and writer. She was Professor at the University of Navarra. Gainza was also a corresponding academic at the Royal Academy of Fine Arts of San Fernando and the Academy de Santa Isabel de Hungary in Seville.

== Life and career ==
Gainza was born in Pamplona, on 1 December 1937. She was educated at the University of Navarra, in the days of Dean Antonio Fontán.

In 1962 she began teaching at the University of Navarra. In 1970, she became an associate professor at the University of Seville. She was the first woman to take over a university position from a man. She taught Contemporary Art and Spanish Renaissance classes at the University of Seville. She was there for five years working with Antonio Bonet Correa.

In March 1975 she was given the Chair at the University of Murcia. She was not there long and she returned the following year to the University of Navarra where she worked for 25 years up to her retirement. As Director of Research she has overseen 50 research works and about thirty Doctoral Theses.

She directed and contributed to Catálogo monumental de Navarra which describes the complete culture and art of Navarre. The work is published in nine volumes and represents 20 years of her and her collaborators research.

Gainza was director of the Department of Art History and was Director of the Navarro Heritage and Art Chair. She was an expert on Spanish Renaissance and Baroque art who has presented at national and international conferences. Her research focus was the history of Italian and Spanish sculpture of the sixteenth to eighteenth centuries.

She was Professor Emeritus at the University of Navarra and she was a corresponding academic at the Royal Academy of Fine Arts of San Fernando and Santa Isabel de Hungary in Seville.

Gainza died on 17 November 2026, at the age of 88.

== Works include ==
- Catálogo monumental de Navarra, 1989
- El escultor Luis Salvador Carmona (1990) ISBN 84-87146-26-0

== Awards ==
- Prince of Viana Award for Culture
- Merindad de Tudela Award
- Cadena Cope Award for Culture
