= Yon González =

Spanish actor

- Born: Yon González Luna; 20 May 1986 (age 39); Bergara, Basque Country, Spain
- Occupation: Actor
- Years active: 2006–present
- Relatives: Aitor Luna (brother)

Yon González Luna (born 20 May 1986) is a Spanish actor. He is probably best known for his performance as Iván Noiret León in the Antena 3 series The Boarding School (El internado), as well as for his role of Julio Olmedo/Espinosa in the television series Gran Hotel and for that of Francisco Gómez in the Netflix series Cable Girls.

== Acting career ==
Yon González began his acting career in the LaSexta series SMS in 2006. He then went on to star in the Antena 3 series The Boarding School (El internado) from 2007 to 2010 which brought him wider popularity. González's performance as Iván Noiret León earned him an ACE Award for Best New Actor in 2010, as well as a Golden Nymph for Best Actor – Drama nomination at the Monte-Carlo Television Festival 2009.

Throughout 2008 and 2009, González starred in the motion pictures Sex, Party and Lies (Mentiras y gordas), opposite Mario Casas, Hugo Silva and his The Boarding School co–star Ana de Armas, and Sebastián Cordero's Rabies (Rabia). He also appeared in the short films The Storymaker (El forjador de historias), Impossible Loves (Amores imposibles), Identity (Identidad) and Latex Puppets (Muñecos de latex), winning the La FILA Festival of Short Films Award for Best Male Performance for the latter. In 2010, González portrayed Constantine II of Greece in Sofía, a television miniseries based on the life of Queen Sofía of Spain. In 2011, González worked primarily in television, appearing in Gran Reserva, which stars his brother Aitor Luna, The Whos (Los Quién) and Gran Hotel (Gran hotel). Gran Hotel, in which he starred opposite his SMS fellow Amaia Salamanca, won him the Fotogramas de Plata Award for Best Television Actor.

During the 2015-2016 he starred in two seasons drama series, Bajo sospecha as the main protagonist, Víctor. The crime drama series are aired on AtresMedia's Atres Player. In that year, he also starred in a thriller movie together with his brother, Aitor Luna in Killing Time (Matar El Tiempo) with the role as Boris.

In 2017-2020 he played the role as Francisco Gómez on Netflix original series, Cable Girls.

The other filming he made was Hil Kanpaiak, a Basque-language movie where he played the role of Iñigo Kortazar, a policeman. The movie has been aired on Festival du Cinéma Espagnol de Nantes 2021. He is also the main protagonist on Heirs to the Land as Hugo Llor. The series—based on a historical novel written by Ildefonso Falcones—aired on Netflix in April 2022.

== Other work ==
In 2007, González modeled for David Delfín at the Cibeles Madrid Fashion Week. He also covered numerous magazines, such as Vanity Fair, Glamour, Marie Claire and Cosmopolitan, either alone or with his The Boarding School fellows.

In 2007, along with Martiño Rivas and Marta Torné, González supported the ONG Childhood Without Limits Foundation.

In 2020, he worked on promoting Dolce & Gabbana's latest perfume, K and campaigned it on his Instagram account.

== Personal and media life ==
González was born in Bergara, Gipuzkoa, and lives in Madrid. His older brother Aitor González Luna is also an actor, probably best known for his role in Los hombres de Paco and Enemigo íntimo. He cites Juan Diego, Jordi Mollà and Luis Tosar as his role models.

In 2011, he was ranked sixth in 20 minutos' list of sexiest Spanish actors.

He is represented by Paloma Juanes entertainment and actor agency.

== Filmography ==
Title	Original Title	Year	Role	Notes
SMS: Sin Miedo a Soñar	SMS	2006-2007	Andrés	TV series; 2006–07
The Boarding School	El internado	2007-2010	Iván Noiret León	TV series; 2007–10; ACE Award for Best New Actor; Nominated—Golden Nymph for Best Actor – Drama
The Storymaker	El forjador de historias	2008	Victor	Short film
Impossible Loves	Amores imposibles	2008	Boy	Short film
Identity	Identidad	2008	Boy	Short film
Sex, Party and Lies	Mentiras y Gordas	2009	Nico	
Latex Puppets	Muñecos de Latex	2009	Adrián	Short film La FILA Festival of Short Films Award for Best Male Performance
Rage	Rabia	2009	Adrián	
Sofía	Sofía	2010	Constantine II of Greece	TV miniseries
Torrente 4	Torrente 4	2011	Peralta	2011
The Whos	Los Quién	2011	Paco	TV series; 1 episode
Unknown Truth	Desconocierto	2011	Man	Short film
Transgression	Transgression	2011	Helio	
Grand Hotel	Gran Hotel	2011-2013	Julio Olmedo	TV series Fotogramas de Plata Award for Best Television Actor
The Misfits Club	El club de los incomprendidos	2014	Rodrigo	
Off Course	Perdiendo el norte	2015	Hugo Cifuentes Marin	
Killing Time	Matar el tiempo	2015	Boris	
Under Suspicion	Bajo sospecha	2015-2016	Víctor García	TV series
Cable Girls	Las chicas del cable	2017-2020	Francisco Gómez	TV series
Death Knell	Hil Kanpaiak	2020	Iñigo Kortazar	
The Boarding School: Las Cumbres	El internado: Las cumbres	2021	Iván Noiret León	TV series, cameo appearance S1:E1
Once Upon a Time in Euskadi	Érase una vez en Euskadi	2021	Félix	
Heirs to the Land	Los herederos de la tierra	2022	Hugo Llor	TV series
Memento mori	Memento mori	2023–	Augusto Ledesma	TV series
Velvet: El nuevo imperio	Velvet: El nuevo imperio	2025	Alberto Márquez	TV series (telenovela)
Reassonable dioubts	La acusacion	2026		Tv series

== Awards and nominations ==
Award	Year	Category	Nominated work	Result	Ref.
La FILA Festival of Short Films	2009	Best Male Performance	Latex Puppets	Won	
Monte-Carlo Television Festival Awards	2009	Golden Nymph for Best Actor – Drama	The Boarding School	Nominated	
Association of Latin Entertainment Critics Awards	2010	Best New Actor	The Boarding School	Won	
Fotogramas de Plata Awards	2011	Best Television Actor	Grand Hotel	Won	
Neox Fan Awards	2012	Best Television Series Actor	Grand Hotel	Nominated	
Neox Fan Awards	2012	Best Kiss of the Year (w/ Amaia Salamanca)	Grand Hotel	Won	
Neox Fan Awards	2013	Best Television Series Actor	Grand Hotel	Nominated	
Neox Fan Awards	2013	Best Kiss of the Year (w/Amaia Salamanca)	Grand Hotel	Nominated	
Fotogramas de Plata Awards	2015	Best Television Actor	Under Suspicion	Won	
32nd Actors and Actresses Union Awards	2024	Best Television Actor in a Leading Role	Memento mori	Nominated	
