= Manel Loureiro =

Spanish author

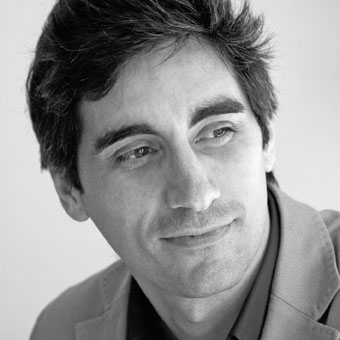
- Manel Loureiro in 2013.
- Born: December 30, 1975 (age 50); Pontevedra, Spain
- Education: University of Santiago de Compostela
- Occupations: Writer, journalist, former lawyer
- Writing career
- Genres: Horror; Thriller

Manel Loureiro (born December 30, 1975, Pontevedra, Spain) is a Spanish author.

== Background ==
Manel Loureiro is a writer, journalist, and former lawyer born in Pontevedra, Spain on December 30, 1975. He earned a law degree at the University of Santiago de Compostela, and has worked as a television presenter in the Television de Galicia1 and as a screenwriter. He collaborates with the daily newspapers of Pontevedra, newspaper ABC.2 and World.3, and is a regular contributor to the Cadena SER and to GQ magazine's Spanish edition. El Confidencial has called him the Spanish Stephen King.

== Novels ==
=== Apocalypse Z series ===
His first novel, Apocalypse Z #1: The Beginning of the End (in Spanish: Apocalipsis Z: El Principio Del Fin), began as a popular blog before its publication and eventually become a bestseller in several countries, including Brazil, Italy, and Spain. AmazonCrossing published book one in English, in October 2012, and the book was translated into Galician in 2013. A film adaptation has also been created in 2024.

Loureiro has written two sequel novels in the Apocalypse Z series: Apocalypse Z #2: Dark Days (2010: in Spanish, Los días oscuros), and Apocalypse Z #3: The Wrath of the Just (2011: in Spanish, La ira de los justos). Books two and three have been translated into English, Italian, and Portuguese, and book two was translated into Galician in 2014.

=== The Last Passenger ===
Loureiro's next book, The Last Passenger (2013: in Spanish, El último pasajero), is about a Nazi ghost ship. The novel was translated into English by Andres Alfaro.

=== Only She Sees ===
Loureiro's most recent book is Only She Sees (2015; in Spanish: Fulgor). The novel was translated into English by Andres Alfaro.

== Personal life ==
Loureiro currently resides in Pontevedra, Spain, where he is a full-time writer.
