= Muruzábal =

Municipality of Spain

Coordinates: 42°41′N 1°46′W

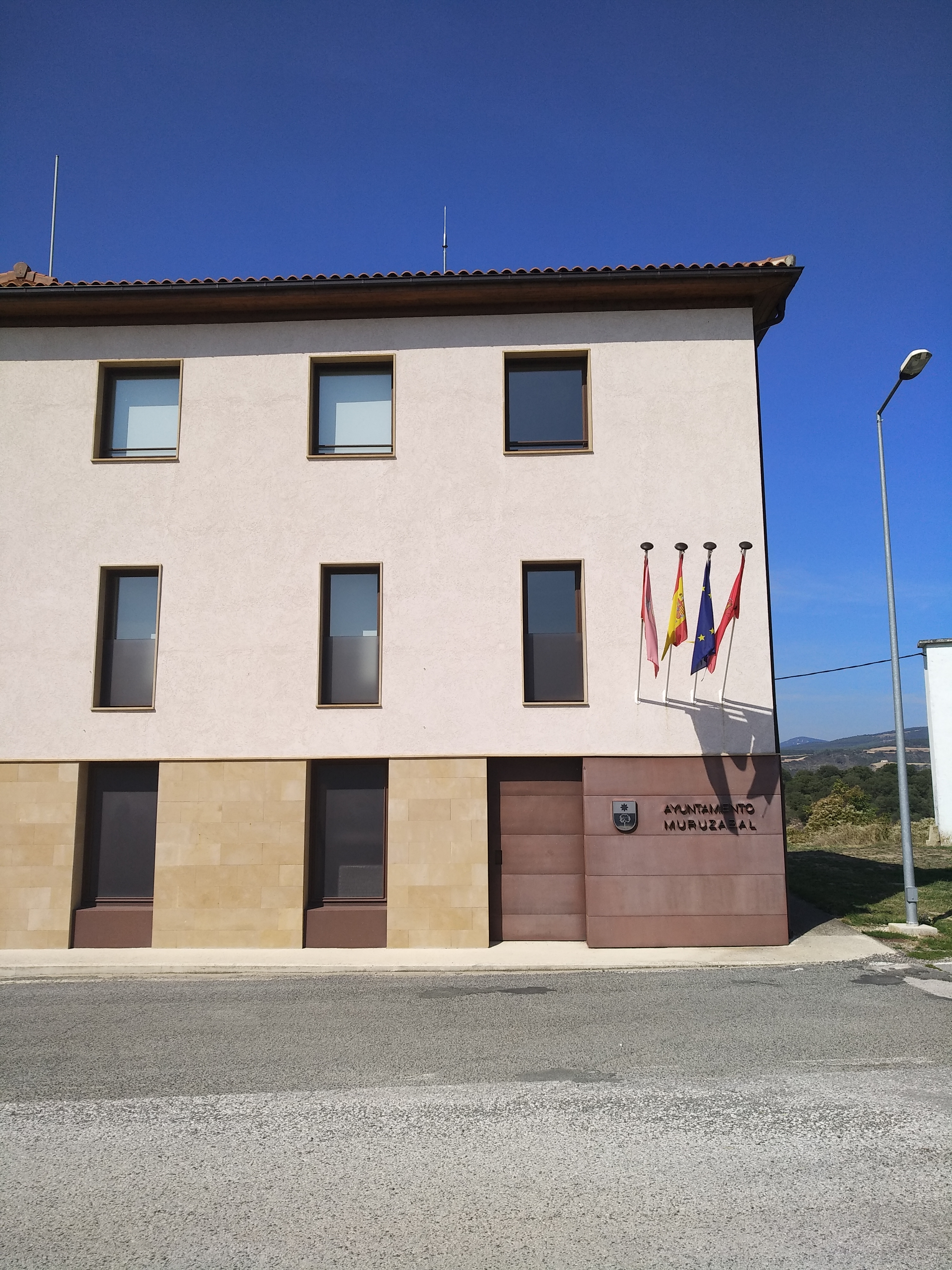

Muruzabal is a town and municipality located in the province and autonomous community of Navarre, northern Spain.

== Demography ==
From:INE Archiv
