= Alex Saint =

Spanish actress (born 1990)

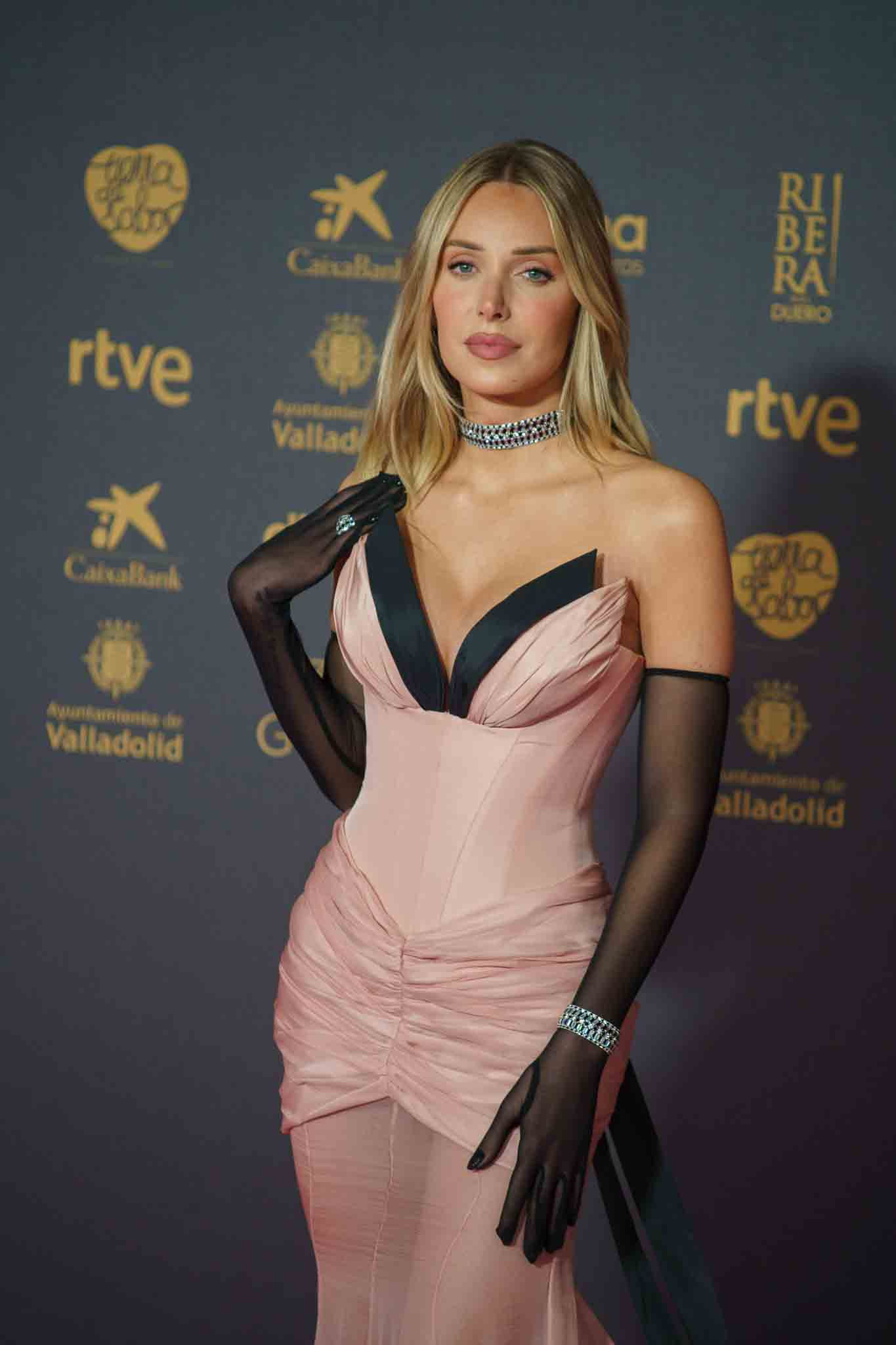
- Born: 28 August 1990 (age 34); Orihuela, Spain
- Occupation(s): Actress, makeup artist, photographer

Alex Saint (born 28 August 1990) is a Spanish actress, model, makeup artist and photographer, known for her role as Sacha in the Atresmedia series Veneno and its sequel Vestidas de azul.

== Early life ==
Saint, who is transgender, felt a great fascination with makeup since she was young, especially from her time at school. However, due to her femininity and her personal tastes, she had been a victim of discrimination and misunderstanding during her childhood.

== Career ==
As a makeup artist, Saint has worked regularly doing makeup for artists such as singer Aitana, actress Ester Expósito and influencer Dulceida, being a personal friend of them.

Saint received her first acting role in the Atresmedia series Veneno, which began airing on 29 March 2022, and in which she portrayed Sacha, one of Cristina La Veneno's friends. In 2023, her participation was revealed in a leading role for the sequel to Veneno, Vestidas de azul, returning together with some actors from the original cast such as Lola Rodríguez or Paca la Piraña.

=== Television ===
Year	Title	Role	Notes
2020	Veneno	Sacha	4 episodes
2023	Vestidas de azul	Sacha	Protagonist
