= Vestidas de azul =

Spanish television series

- Promotional release poster
- Based on: Vestidas de azul: Análisis social y cinematográfico de la mujer transexual en los años de la Transición Española by Valeria Vegas
- Directed by: Mikel Rueda; Claudia Costafreda; Ian de la Rosa
- Country of origin: Spain
- Original language: Spanish
- No. of episodes: 7

Production
- Executive producers: Montse García; Valeria Vegas; Andrea H. Catalá
- Producers: Javier Calvo; Javier Ambrossi
- Production companies: Atresmedia TV; Suma Content

Original release
- Network: atresplayer
- Release: 17 December 2023 – 28 January 2024

Related
- Veneno

Vestidas de azul is a Spanish drama television miniseries billed as a follow-up to Veneno. The series is based on the book Vestidas de azul: Análisis social y cinematográfico de la mujer transexual en los años de la Transición Española by Valeria Vegas.

== Plot ==
Two years after the death of Cristina Ortiz, Valeria Vegas finds a VHS tape of documentary film Vestida de azul, inspiring her to write a new work about the lives of the six trans women featured in the documentary.

== Cast ==
- Lola Rodríguez as Valeria
- Paca La Piraña
- Rossa Ceballos as adult Loren
- Bimba Farelo as young Loren
- Chloe Santiago as Tamara
- Geena Román as Eva
- Alma Gormedino as Josette
- Penélope Guerrero as Nacha
- Keyla Òdena as Renée
- Goya Toledo as Lola
- Juani Ruiz
- Alex Saint as Sacha
- Ángeles Ortega as Manola
- Desirée Vogue as Bienvenida
- Marisa Paredes as La República
- Susana Abaitua
- Elena Irureta
- Luis Callejo
- Estrella Xtravaganza
- Mercedes Sampietro
- Anabel Alonso
- Pedro Casablanc
- Llum Barrera
- Guiomar Puerta
- Claudia Traisac
- Nerea Rodríguez
- Clara Sans
- Juriji der Klee
- Malena Gracia

== Episodios ==
| No. | Title | Directed by | Written by | Original release date |
|---|---|---|---|---|
| 1 | "Loren" | Mikel Rueda | Valeria Vegas, Javier Holgado Vicente and Susana López Rubio | 17 December 2023 |
| 2 | "Tamara" | Mikel Rueda | Valeria Vegas, Javier Holgado Vicente and Susana López Rubio | 24 December 2023 |
| 3 | "Renée" | Claudia Costafreda | Valeria Vegas, Javier Holgado Vicente and Susana López Rubio | 31 December 2023 |
| 4 | "Eva" | Claudia Costafreda | Valeria Vegas, Javier Holgado Vicente, Susana López Rubio, Javier Ferreiro, Claudia Costafreda and Mikel Rueda | 7 January 2024 |
| 5 | "Teresa" | Mikel Rueda | Javier Ferreiro, Claudia Costafreda and Mikel Rueda | 14 January 2024 |
| 6 | "Josette" | Ian de la Rosa | Javier Ferreiro, Claudia Costafreda and Mikel Rueda | 21 January 2024 |
| 7 | "Nacha" | Claudia Costafreda | Javier Ferreiro, Claudia Costafreda and Mikel Rueda | 28 January 2024 |

== Production ==
The series was produced by Atresmedia TV in collaboration with Suma Content. Returning cast members from Veneno include Lola Rodríguez, Paca La Piraña, Goya Toledo, Juani Ruiz, Alex Saint, Ángeles Ortega and Desirée Vogue, with new starring roles for Rossa Ceballos, Bimba Farelo, Chloe Santiago, Geena Román, Alma Gormedino, Penélope Guerrero and Keyla Òdena. Further cast additions such as Susana Abaitua, Elena Irureta, Luis Callejo, Mercedes Sampietro, Anabel Alonso, Pedro Casablanc, Llum Barrera, Estrella Xtravaganza and Juriji der Klee were announced in February 2023 at the Berlinale Series Market.

Valeria Vegas, Javier Holgado, Susana López Rubio, Javier Ferreiro, Mikel Rueda and Claudia Costafreda took over writing duties.

The episodes were directed by Mikel Rueda, Claudia Costafreda, and Ian de la Rosa. Filming began in December 2022.

== Release ==
The series premiered on Atresplayer on 17 December 2023. Atresmedia reached distribution deals with HBO Max in Portugal, the Nordics, and the Baltics.

== Accolades ==
| Year | Award | Category | Nominee(s) | Result | Ref. |
|---|---|---|---|---|---|
| 2025 | 36th GLAAD Media Awards | Outstanding Spanish-Language Scripted Television Series | | Nominated | |

== See also ==
- 2023 in Spanish television
