= Bimba Farelo =

Spanish actress and artist

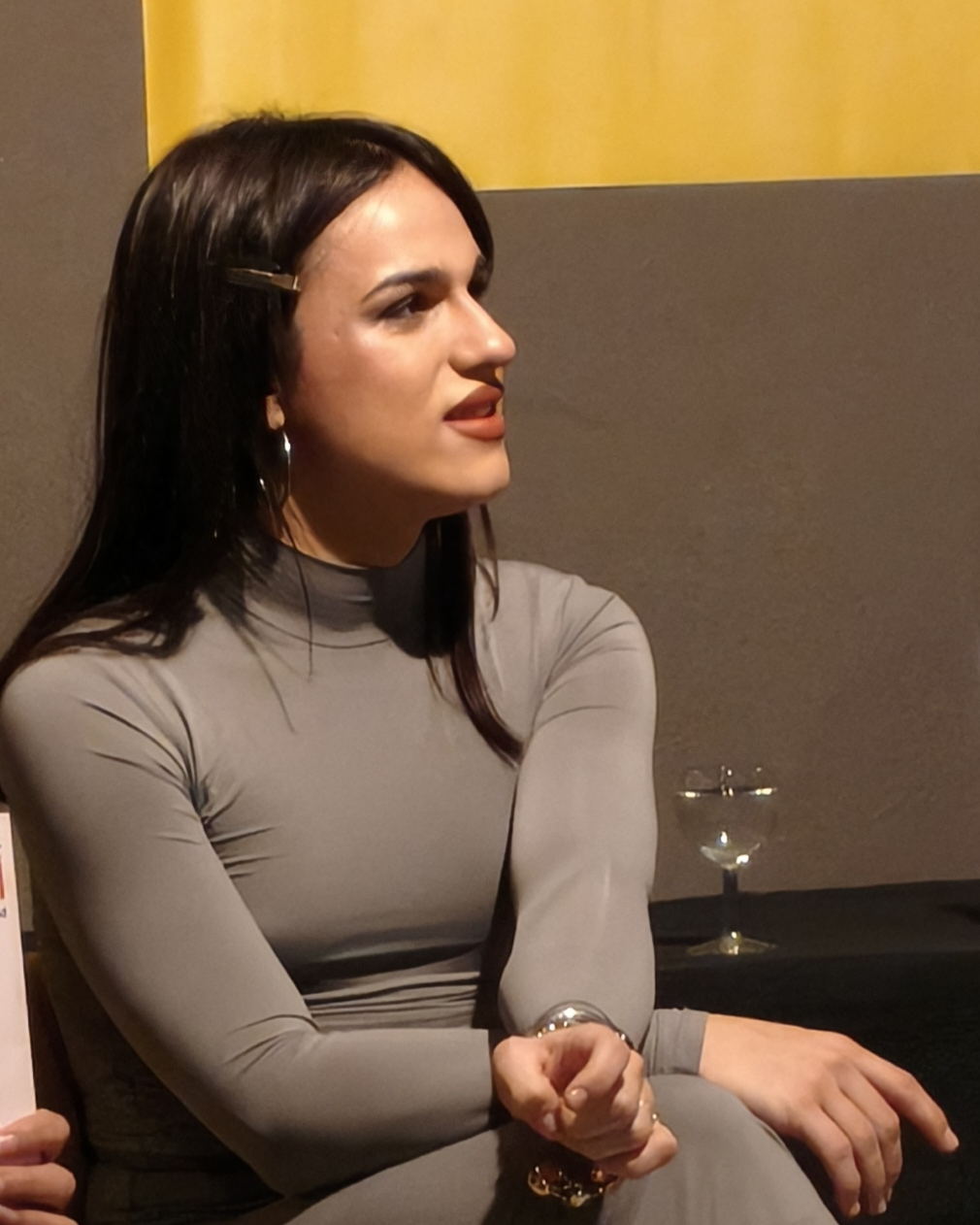
- Born: Benalup-Casas Viejas, Cádiz, Andalusia, Spain
- Occupations: Actress, artist

Bimba Farelo is a Spanish actress and artist, known for her role as Loren Arana in the web series Vestidas de azul, a continuation of the Atresplayer series Veneno.

== Life and career ==
Farelo was born and raised in Cádiz. At 19, she moved to Barcelona looking to study acting, and through her friendship with actress Isabel Torres, she began to question her identity and began her gender transition. She later moved to Madrid, where she performed as a cabaret actress.

In September 2023, Farelo played the lead role in the play Tamarola!, based on her own experience growing up in Las Lagunetas. In December of that same year she played the role of Loren Arana Arellano, a historical Spanish trans activist, in the TV series Vestidas de azul, who co-starred in the 1983 documentary of the same name, which inspired the series.

Vogue Spain magazine included Farelo on the list of new faces in film and television to keep an eye on in 2023, along with national and international actresses such as Halle Bailey.

== Filmography ==
- Vestidas de azul (2023)
