= Manuela Saborido Muñoz =

Spanish artist and businesswoman

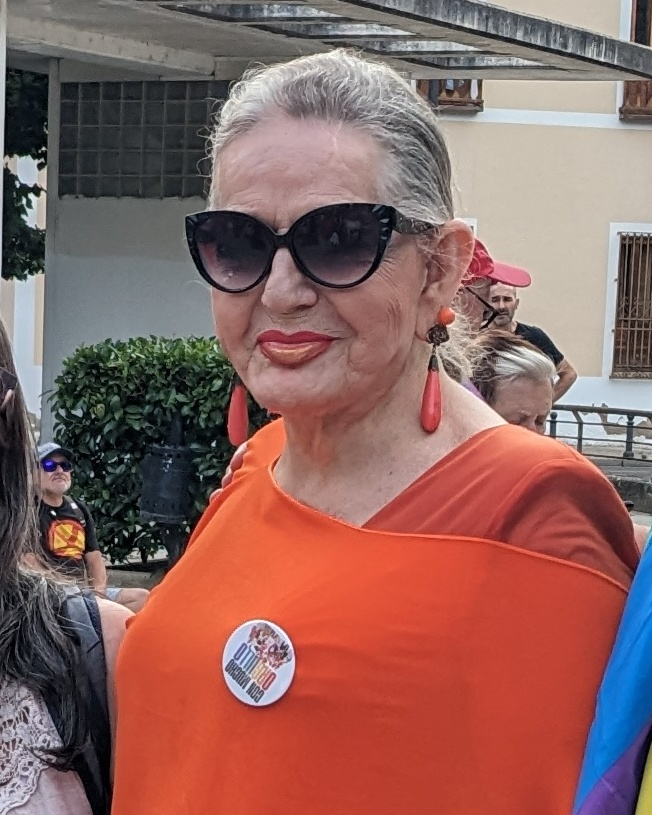
- Manolita Chen in 2024
- Born: 1 October 1943 (age 82); Arcos de la Frontera, Spain
- Other names: Manolita Chen
- Occupations: Artist, businesswoman
- Awards: Order of Merit of the Civil Guard (2023)

Manuela Saborido Muñoz (born 1 October 1943), better known by her stage name Manolita Chen, (Note: See section on her dispute with Manuela Fernández Pérez over the name.) is a Spanish artist and businesswoman. She is recognized as being one of the first trans women to have her change of name and sex approved on her national identity document (DNI) in the late 1970s, for being granted the right to adopt in 1985, and for being a key figure in the LGBT community in Spain.

== Early life and career ==
Saborido was born in Arcos de la Frontera, Cádiz on 1 October 1943. Her father died of alcoholism when she was young, and her mother was left to take care of her eleven siblings. From childhood she identified as female, and her family and part of her community rejected her for her gender identity. At the age of six she worked cleaning houses in exchange for food, and at eleven as an apprentice shoemaker.

For a time, Saborido took over the family business, the María la Viuda tavern, which prospered until the mayor abruptly decided to close it. This caused her to move to Vilanova i la Geltrú in the early 1960s, where she worked as a bricklayer, cleaner, kitchen assistant, and newspaper delivery girl. The poverty and mistreatment that Saborido suffered during her childhood and youth took her to Paris, where she became a vedette at just 16 years old. She was then assigned to Córdoba to fulfill the Francoist mandatory military service requirement, but due to mistreatment by her companions and because she did not pass the physical entrance tests, she was assigned to Jerez as a cook.

Saborido married twice, the first time at age 20 by "transsexual rite", and the second time in 1966, a marriage that lasted 28 years. In 1969, she had an operation in Casablanca, then settled in Barcelona and began her artistic career as a copla singer. She was hired by Paco España, and began to act in several Spanish theaters. Outside Spain, she performed in Paris, Rome, Berlin, San Francisco, and Las Vegas. She belonged to the companies of Juanito Navarro, and also acted with Lola Flores and Juanito Valderrama. She eventually created her own company called Manolita Chen. Despite her popularity, the Vagrants and Criminals Law was applied to her three times.

During the Spanish transition to democracy, she became an activist for LGBT rights and participated in the first demonstrations that were held in the country to support this cause, visiting the Pasaje Begoña in Torremolinos on several occasions. In the late 1970s, Saborido became the first person in Spain to have her female identity appear on her DNI, changing her name to Manuela Saborido Muñoz. She later recalled,

Freedom was approaching, and we began to loudly demand that some of the rights we have today be recognised. For example, that our real identity be shown on our ID cards. And that we should be able to get married. I went to many of those first demonstrations. We ended up with the Guard on our backs. People booed us and even threw stones at us. But I have always been a fighter. I wanted Manuel Saborido to stop appearing on my ID card. I was fed up with hotel receptionists looking at me with sarcasm. So, shortly before the law that allowed it was passed, I pulled some strings in the government. Because I knew several queers in high places – homosexuals and gentlemen from head to toe. And that is why, before the 80s, I managed to obtain the first Spanish ID card that recognised that someone who had been born a man could be legally treated as a woman.

In the early 1980s, she abandoned her artistic career to become a businesswoman in the Arcos hospitality industry, opening the cabarets El Camborio, El Rincón Andaluz, La Cuadra, and the restaurant Los Tres Caminos.

In March 1985, Saborido became the country's first transgender adoptive mother, of her first daughter María, who had Down syndrome. She then adopted sons Alfonso and José, both with cerebral palsy. She was also the first openly transgender woman interviewed on Televisión Española, on José María Íñigo's show in the 1980s. Shortly afterward, she divorced and went through a period of depression that almost led her to ruin, so she had to close her businesses.

Saborido was convicted of a crime related to her ex-husband and drug trafficking that led to her imprisonment in 2004, although she later declared that she had been convinced to accept a plea agreement despite not being guilty. She was detained for nine months in the Puerto II prison in Cádiz, during which time Saborido became the head of the prison's library and dedicated herself to caring for sick and struggling inmates.

During her life, she collected Elizabethan-style decorative pieces and antiques for her home, and in August 2013 she turned it into a museum, with money received from ticket sales being dedicated to social assistance for the people of her hometown.

In 2021, she founded the Manuela Saborido Foundation: Manolita Chen, Arcos de la Frontera. With the aim of "promoting the legacy of Mrs. Manuela Saborido as an activist in favour of the LGBT community and other disadvantaged groups, as well as promoting and publicising all the social causes and struggles for equal rights that are part of her life." For the operation of her foundation, she donated all her real estate assets and works of art. This helped her to inaugurate, together with a collaboration agreement with the organization Inserta Andalucía, the first shelter in Arcos de la Frontera to serve as a refuge for people who have suffered rejection for being part of the LGBT community. Since 2023, the foundation has had its headquarters in the Flora Tristán International Space for Social, Cultural, and Technological Innovation at Pablo de Olavide University in Seville.

== Awards and recognition ==
Saborido is not only recognized for being one of the first transsexual artists to make a place for herself in the Spanish scene, but also for being a key figure in the struggles of the LGBT community. In 2014, the Association of Transsexuals of Andalusia (ATA) presented her with an award for her career in the fight for freedom, for normalization, visibility, and for her courage in an era when being transsexual was a crime.

In 2016, Spanish writer and filmmaker Valeria Vegas dedicated her first documentary, Manolita, la Chen de Arcos, to Saborido's life. In this 60-minute film, Vegas, as director, tells the story of Saborido's adoption process as the first transgender mother in Spain, as well as some facts about her career as an artist and businesswoman. The same year, this work was named Best Spanish Documentary by the jury of the Madrid International LGBT Film Festival, LesGaiCineMad. In addition, the documentary was screened at events such as the 2nd Pride Culture Festival in Seville in 2018 and at the Ateneo de Madrid in June 2019.

In 2018, Saborido was the herald of the 5th Serrano Pride of Cádiz, an event at which a tribute was also dedicated to her life. On 13 June 2019, Saborido, José García Fernández, and Juan Bellido received recognition as representatives of the LGBT community, presented by the Cádiz City Council as the LGBT Memory Act. This was part of the Cádiz Pride 2019 program, with the objective of "vindicating the figures of LGBT men and women of Cádiz and their contribution to the development of the city."

In 2020, she received the +Social Award from the Regional Government of Andalusia, nominated by the Pasaje Begoña Foundation, in the category of work to support LGBT people and their families.

In 2022, Saborido received the Jerez Rainbow Award, recognizing her as a "tireless fighter for the rights of transgender people, who has become a role model for the LGBT community", and highlighting her career because "since birth she suffered discrimination against those who feel different and want to be free." The same year, she was invited to be herald of the LGBT Pride party in Algeciras. Also, in October, she received the Gold Decoration of the Roja Directa Awards. At the event, an agent of the Civil Guard gave a speech apologizing to Saborido for the treatment that she received from members of the institution in the past.

She was also presented with the Silver Cross of the Order of Merit of the Civil Guard in recognition of her role in the fight for LGBT rights.

At the 2023 Málaga Film Festival, the Spanish film director, Rafael Robles Gutiérrez, better known as Rafatal, premiered the documentary TransUniversal, which tells the story of the fight for the recognition of the rights of trans people. Saborido acts as the common thread of the story, along with figures such as Daniela Santiago, Rodrigo Cuevas, Ángelo Néstore, Elizabeth Duval, La Prohibida, Pink Chadora, Mar Cambrollé, Lara Sajen, Topacio Fresh, Carla Antonelli, Valeria Vegas, Juani Ruiz, and Samantha Hudson. In March of that year, on the occasion of the commemoration of the International Transgender Day of Visibility, the University of Huelva and the Huelva City Council organized a meeting in which Saborido was invited to talk about her life and career. She was also one of five subjects of the exhibition Unos cuerpos son como flores. Naturalezas trans (Some Bodies are Like Flowers: Trans Natures), at the Espacio Santa Clara in Seville, curated by the Spanish painter Pablo Peinado, which contains 140 portraits taken by 40 photographers.

A walkway is named after her in Torremolinos, called "Pasaje Manolita Chen", which is located between numbers 5 and 7 of Avenida Isabel Manoja and Calle Montmartre. It was approved in a plenary session in February 2023, following a proposal from the Pasaje Begoña Association.

== Dispute over the stage name Manolita Chen ==
The artist and circus entrepreneur Manuela Fernández Pérez gained fame performing under the name Manolita Chen beginning in the 1940s. When she left Manolita Chen's Chinese Theater in the late 1970s due to an ear tumor and facial paralysis, a competing company hired Saborido to perform under Fernández's stage name and recreate some of her sketches. This situation generated great confusion among fans, and prompted a lawsuit from Fernández. The dispute was taken to a court in Seville, where it was verified that neither of the two had legally registered the name Manolita Chen, so the case would be resolved if both parties reached an agreement. However, Fernández died in 2017 without giving her consent.
