= Geena Román =

Spanish actress (born 1994)

- Born: Geena María Román Martínez; December 15, 1994 (age 30); San José, Almería, Spain
- Citizenship: Spanish
- Occupation: Actress

Geena Román (born December 15, 1994, in San José, Almería, Spain) is a Spanish actress, known for her roles as Sissy in White Lines, Perla in Limbo... Hasta que lo decida, and Eva in Vestidas de azul.

== Career ==
In 2018, Román was one of the protagonists in the LGBT-themed documentary The Best Day Of My Life, directed by Fernando González Molina, which also featured actress Abril Zamora.

A year later, in 2019, she made her television series debut, playing a minor character in an episode of Terror y feria.

Subsequently, she moved to Argentina for six months to participate in the filming of Limbo... Hasta que lo decida, in which she portrayed the character of Perla.

In 2023, she took on one of the leading roles in the Atresmedia web series Vestidas de azul, inspired by Valeria Vegas' work of the same name, in which she played the character of Eva Pérez de los Cobos.

== Filmography ==
=== Cinema ===
Year	Title	Role	Notes
2018	The Best Day Of My Life	Herself	Documentary

=== Television ===
Year	Title	Role	Duration
2019	Terror y feria	Girl	1 episode
2020	White Lines	Sissy	4 episodes
2020	Veneno	Mortuary receptionist	1 episode
2022	Limbo... Hasta que lo decida	Perla	10 episodes
2023	Vestidas de azul	Eva	7 episodes
2024	Eva & Nicole	Deborah	5 episodes
