= Laura Frenchkiss =

Spanish actress and activist (1955–2021)

- Born: Laura García Soroa; 23 December 1955; Bilbao, Spain
- Died: October 24, 2021 (aged 65); Torremolinos, Spain
- Occupations: Actress, vedette, sex worker, and LGBT rights activist.

Laura García Soroa (December 23, 1955 – October 24, 2021), better known as Laura Frenchkiss, was a Spanish actress, vedette, sex worker, and LGBT rights activist, known for her role as Rocío in the Atresmedia web series Veneno.

== Early life and career ==
She was abandoned in an orphanage shortly after her birth. At the age of 4, she was adopted by a couple from Valencia, who sent her to study at La Salle boarding school. Later, after the death of her adoptive father, she was abandoned again, as her mother could not take care of her due to depression and epileptic seizures. After expressing her gender identity and desire to be a woman, Laura was admitted to a psychiatric center until she was 18 years old.

As an adult, she obtained a hairdressing qualification and found a partner, although both were beaten while hitchhiking in an attempt to move to Barcelona.

At the age of 20, she began working as a sex worker and performing as a vedette in venues such as La Modelo, where she was arrested and subsequently imprisoned twice under the Ley de Vagos y Maleantes (Vagrancy Act), which was in effect until 1978.

Later, Laura was one of the first people to undergo sex reassignment surgery in Spain, also investing 1,600,000 pesetas in changing her national identity card.

Laura sought political asylum in France, where she lived for a time before returning to Spain. Upon her return, she resumed work as a sex worker, this time in the Guadalhorce industrial estate in Torremolinos, until she met Antonio Pozo, manager of the Parthenon nightclub, who offered her a job as the club's public relations representative.

In 2020, she played the role of Rocío in the Atresmedia web series Veneno, based on the memoirs of sex worker and vedette Cristina La Veneno, with whom Frenchkiss had worked in prostitution in Parque del Oeste years earlier.

In October 2021, she died at the age of 66 from a heart attack on the street in Torremolinos while returning home after working at the Parthenon nightclub, as she regularly did.

== Tributes ==
After her death, Laura received a tribute in the city of Torremolinos in the square dedicated to the trans community, near the town hall square. The event was attended by Laura's family and friends, as well as the Councilor for Equality Carmen García, and council members Nicolás de Miguel and Lucía Cuín.

Among the celebrities who publicly mourned her death were directors Javier Calvo and Javier Ambrossi, as well as actress and co-star Daniela Santiago.

== Filmography ==
=== Television series ===
Year	Title	Character	Channel	Duration
2020	Veneno	Rocío	Atresplayer Premium	4 episodes
