= Loren Arana Arellano =

Spanish LGBTQ rights activist (1938–2002)

- Born: 1938; Trebujena, Andalusia, Spain
- Died: 2002 (aged 63–64); Trebujena, Andalusia, Spain

Loren Arana Arellano (1938–2002) was a Spanish trans woman and LGBTQ rights activist. She lived from prostitution in Madrid and became known for starring in the 1983 documentary Vestida de azul.

== Life and career ==
Loren Arana Arellano was born in 1938, into a family of eight siblings. She grew up in the municipality of Trebujena, in the province of Cádiz. She completed her military service, and later adopted the name of Loren. She worked in the house of some marquises as a domestic service staff.

In 1983, she starred in the documentary by Antonio Giménez-Rico Vestida de azul, a pioneer in the representation of the reality of trans women in Spain.

She suffered a stroke, according to her partner and friend Juani Ruiz.

At some point in her life she was imprisoned in Carabanchel by the Law of Danger and Social Rehabilitation, and after serving her sentence, in 1996 she moved from Madrid to her hometown, where she lived until her death in 2002.

== Legacy ==
On February 25, 2019, the writer and LGBTQ activist Valeria Vegas published her essay Vestidas de azul, focused on investigating the lives of the 6 members of the original documentary, including Arellano, who had completely disappeared from the public eye after its premiere.

The 2019 LGBT Pride week was dedicated to Arellano's memory. The writer Valeria Vegas made a presentation of her work Vestidas de azul, focused on the lives of Arellano and the rest of the protagonists of the documentary. On June 28, a screening of this documentary was held and, finally, on the 29th, a plaque was inaugurated in tribute to Arellano on Doña Amparo Salazar Street, where she was born.

In November 2023, Atresmedia premiered the series Vestidas de azul, which focused on the protagonists of the 2019 documentary. Nacha was played by actress Bimba Farelo during her time in compulsory military service, and by Rossa Ceballos as an adult.

== Filmography ==
- Vestida de azul (1983)
