= Nacha María Sánchez =

Spanish sex worker and actress (born 1983)

- Born: Nacha María Sánchez Sánchez; August 11, 1962 (age 64); Madrid, Spain
- Occupations: Spanish sex worker and actress.

Nacha María Sánchez Sánchez (born August 11, 1962, in Madrid, Spain) is a Spanish sex worker and actress, who gained recognition for starring in the 1983 documentary "Vestida de azul" (Dressed in Blue).

== Life and career ==
Nacha grew up in Madrid's Embajadores neighborhood and left home at age 13 due to her gender identity, finding herself compelled to engage in sex work. Shortly afterward, she was taken in by Laura Frenchkiss and Tania Navarro.

Her sister Tatiana Sánchez is also a trans woman.

In 1983, she was one of six protagonists in the documentary Vestida de azul, which pioneered the portrayal of trans people's reality in Spain. Following her appearance in the documentary, she had minor acting roles in Alma de mujer (Woman's Soul) and Pepe Carvalho.

In 2023, she returned to acting with a role in the Atresmedia web series Vestidas de azul, based on Valeria Vegas's book of the same name, which chronicles the lives of Nacha and the other protagonists from the original documentary.

She contributed to the book Crónicas Transexuales (Transsexual Chronicles) by David de la Torre. She also collaborated on and co-starred in the book Memoria Diversa (Diverse Memory) by Eva Mejuto, which won the Rosalía de Castro Award.

== Tributes ==
Nacha was among those honored in the exhibition Unos cuerpos son como flores. Naturalezas trans (Some Bodies Are Like Flowers: Trans Natures), held from February 9 to April 9, 2023, at Espacio Santa Clara, part of Seville's Institute of Culture and Arts. The exhibition aimed to pay tribute to trans pioneers in Spain's LGBT rights movement.

== Filmography ==
- Vestida de azul (documentary, 1983)
- Alma de mujer (documentary, 1983)
- Vestidas de azul (web series, 2024)

== Awards ==
- MuestraT Award (2022)
- CinemaTrans Honorary Award (2024)
