= Lola Rodríguez (actress) =

Spanish actress, model, and activist

- Rodríguez in 2026
- Born: 26 November 1998 (age 27); Las Palmas, Spain
- Occupations: Actress, model

Lola Rodríguez Díaz (born 26 November 1998) is a Spanish actress, model, and LGBT rights activist.

== Biography ==
At age eleven, Lola Rodríguez Díaz came out as transgender, and was recognized as such at school. With the support of her parents, she began her transitioning process at thirteen. She was a psychology student in Portugal when she began acting.

In 2015 she was the first transgender minor candidate for Queen of the Carnival of Las Palmas with the fantasy La vida es bella, sponsored by the Island Council. She followed in the footsteps of Isabel Torres, who had been the first trans woman candidate in 2005. Rodríguez was chosen fourth maid of honor. The same year, she participated in the Las Palmas LGBT pride demonstration, where she gave a speech.

In 2018, as part of the scheduled events of the Madrid LGBT pride parade, she wore a garment called the Amsterdam Rainbow Dress, made from the flags of countries where being a member of the LGBT community is illegal. In 2016 the dress was worn by Valentijn de Hingh.

Her first job in a television series was a starring role in Atresmedia's Veneno, created by Javier Ambrossi and Javier Calvo based on the life of Cristina La Veneno, where she played a young Valeria Vegas.

== Filmography ==
=== Film ===
Year	Title	Role	Ref.
2021	Poliamor para principiantes (Polyamory for Dummies)	Claudia	
2026	Mi querida señorita (My Dearest Señorita)		

=== TV series ===
Year	Title	Rol	Channel	Director	Episodes
2020	Veneno	Valeria Vegas	Atresplayer Premium	Javier Ambrossi and Javier Calvo	7 episodes
2020	Ellas	Herself	Atresplayer Premium	Special	1 episode
2022–2023	Bienvenidos a Edén	Mayka	Netflix		16 episodes

=== TV programs ===
Year	Title	Channel	Notes
2015	Carnival of Las Palmas	Nova	Queen's 4th classified
