= Nacho (2023 TV series) =

- Promotional release poster
- Created by: Teresa Fernández-Valdés; Ramón Campos; Gema R. Neira
- Written by: Teresa Fernández-Valdés; Gema R. Neira; María José Rustarazo; Flora G. Villanueva
- Directed by: David Pinillos; Beatriz Sanchís; Eduardo Casanova
- Starring: Martiño Rivas; María de Nati; Andrés Velencoso; Penélope Guerrero; Miriam Giovanelli
- Country of origin: Spain
- Original language: Spanish
- No. of seasons: 1
- No. of episodes: 8

Production
- Production companies: Bambú Producciones; La Claqueta PC

Original release
- Network: Atresplayer
- Release: 5 March – 23 April 2023

Nacho is a Spanish biographical television series created by Teresa Fernández-Valdés, Ramón Campos, and Gema R. Neira. It stars Martiño Rivas as the title character along with María de Nati, Andrés Velencoso, Penélope Guerrero, and Miriam Giovanelli. Produced by Bambú for Lionsgate+, it was eventually acquired by Atresmedia, debuting on Atresplayer Premium on 5 March 2023.

== Plot ==
The plot tracks the beginnings of pornographic actor Nacho Vidal in the sex industry and the Sala Bagdad in Barcelona.

== Cast ==
- Martiño Rivas as Nacho Vidal
- María de Nati as Sara Bernat
- Andrés Velencoso as Toni Roca
- Marina Gatell as Sophie Evans
- Miriam Giovanelli as Bellísima
- Penélope Guerrero as Lady
- Pepa Charro as Juani
- Edu Soto as Tigerman
- Nuria Herrero as María José Jordá
- Carmen Conesa as Olga
- Montse Guallar as Inmaculada
- Nancho Novo as Enrique
- Albert Baró as Samuel
- Rubén Jiménez as Holly One
- Juan Carlos Vellido as José María Ponce
- Paola Bontempi as María Bianco

== Production ==
The series was created by Teresa Fernández-Valdés, Ramón Campos, and Gema R. Neira whilst David Pinillos, Beatriz Sanchís, and Eduardo Casanova, directed the 8 episodes. The writing team consisted of Teresa Fernández-Valdés, Gema R. Neira, María José Rustarazo, and Flora G. Villanueva.

== Release ==
Produced for Lionsgate+, the end of operations of the former in the territory of Spain forced the sale of the series to Atresplayer Premium. The series eventually premiered on Atresplayer on 5 March 2023. The original broadcasting run ended on 23 April 2023.
