= Lara Martorell =

Spanish actress

Lara Martorell Via
- Born: 18 August 1987 (age 37); Palma de Mallorca, Mallorca, Spain [1]

Lara Martorell Via (born 18 August 1987) is a Spanish actress. She is known for her role in the television series Servir y proteger (2019-2020), where she became the first transgender actress to play a permanent transgender character on Spanish television, and for her role as La Fani in Veneno (2020).

== Career ==
Martorell was born and raised in Palma de Mallorca, where she studied acting at a local theater school. She transitioned during her teenager years, during which she states that she suffered bullying. After graduating secondary school, she left Mallorca to study acting at theater workshops and schools in Madrid and London. In 2019, she made her acting debut in the film Pullman. From 2019 to 2020, she played the role of Ángela Betanzos in the television series Servir y proteger, where she became known as the first transgender actress to play a transgender protagonist in a Spanish television series. She auditioned for the role of La Veneno in the biopic of her life, and was ultimately cast for the role of La Fani. In 2021, she appeared in the series Sicília sense morts, based on the novel with the same name by Guillem Frontera.

Also in 2021, she acted in the stage production Con mi dolor a solas. Later that same year, she walked as a model in Madrid Fashion Week, wearing clothes by Uruguayan designer Steven Vázquez.

== Filmography ==
=== Film ===
- Pullman (2019)
- Anecoica (Short film, 2023)

=== Television ===
- Servir y proteger (2019-2020)
- Veneno (2020)
