= Lola Rodríguez =

Lola Rodríguez may refer to:

- Lola Rodríguez (actress) (born 1998), Spanish actress and model
- Lola Rodríguez de Tió (1843–1924), Puerto Rican poet
