= Alma Gormedino =

Spanish actress (born 1992)

- Born: 8 February 1992 (age 34); Calatayud, Zaragoza, Aragon, Spain
- Occupations: Actress, screenwriter, audiovisual producer

Alma Gormedino Gracia (born 8 February 1992) is a Spanish actress, known for her leading roles in the short film Un viaje de ida y vuelta and the 2023 Atresmedia series Vestidas de azul.

== Early life ==
Alma Gormedino was born in Calatayud, Zaragoza, and at the age of 18 she moved to Madrid to study acting. She trained at the William Layton Theatre Laboratory, and later began appearing in various plays and audiovisual media.

== Career ==
Gormedino had her first role in an audiovisual medium in the 2014 Spanish web series New Corpse, in the pilot episode, titled "Joven Christian". In 2016 she starred in the short film Un viaje de ida y vuelta, in which she played Hugo, a young man who needs a kidney transplant. The documentary was directed by Alba Zarzuela and sought to raise awareness about the importance of organ donation. In 2023, after a gender transition process, Gormedino was announced as one of the leading actresses in the Atresmedia series Vestidas de azul, a continuation of the series Veneno, which premiered on 17 December 2023.

== Personal life ==
Gormedino is part of the It Gets Better Project, which seeks to prevent suicide among transgender and LGBT adolescents.

== Filmography ==
=== Film ===
Year	Title	Role	Note
2015	Uno menos		Short film
2016	Un viaje de ida y vuelta	Hugo	Short film

=== Television ===
Year	Title	Role	Notes
2014	New Corpse		1 episode
2015	La que se avecina		
2023	Vestidas de azul	Josette	Protagonist

=== Theatre ===
Year	Work	Role	Director
2014	PasaporLorca		Junior Ferbelles
2020	Al Extremo		Miguel Ángel Olivares

=== Podcasts ===
Year	Title
2017-2020	People FM
