= Juani Ruiz =

Spanish actress and singer

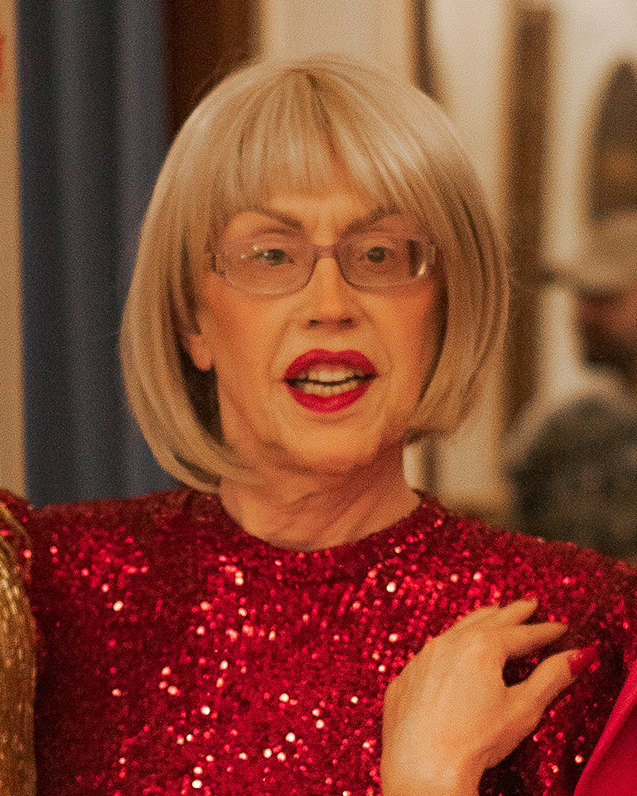
- Juani Ruiz in 2014
- Born: June 10, 1962 (age 63); Badolatosa, Seville
- Occupations: Actress and singer

Juani Ruiz Hidalgo (born 10 June 1962) is a Spanish actress and singer, best known for her roles in the Atresmedia web series Veneno, Cardo and Vestidas de azul.

== Career ==
Before moving to Madrid, she worked with her family in agricultural labor in the countryside of her hometown.

She began studying theater in 2000 at the "La Lavandería" school. She performed in small-scale plays such as The Witches of Salem.

Juani Ruiz rose to fame in 2020 with her acting debut, playing herself in the Atresmedia biographical series Veneno, produced by Javier Calvo and Javier Ambrossi and focused on the life of Cristina la Veneno.

In 2021, she played the role of Puri in Cardo. Juani also welcomed the fact that through this role, she got to play a cisgender woman for the first time, instead of a trans woman as she usually would.

In March 2023, she released her first single, Fantasmas del pasado. For the production of the video clip, she had the collaboration of the journalist José Mola and the drag queen Peka Mimosa, and it was filmed in Madrid. The writer and activist Valeria Vegas referred to her in reference to the video clip as a "woman of fulfilled dreams", given that Juani wanted to be a singer since her childhood.

She reprised her role playing herself in the Atresmedia series Vestidas de azul, a sequel to Veneno, which premiered in December 2023.

In March 2024, she released her second single, Ahora viene lo mejor.

== Filmography ==
=== Cinema ===
Year	Title	Role	Notes
2023	Transuniversal	Herself	Documentary

=== Television ===
Year	Title	Role	Notes
1997	Esta noche cruzamos el Mississippi	Herself	Two interviews
2020	Veneno	Juani	5 episodes
2021	Cardo	Puri	2 episodes
2023	Vestidas de azul	Juani	Protagonist
2025	Superstar	Juani Jusmusic	1 episode

== Discography ==
Year	Single
2023	Fantasmas del pasado
2024	Ahora viene lo mejor

== Awards ==
- CinemaTrans Honorary Award (2024).
