= Jedet =

Spanish actress

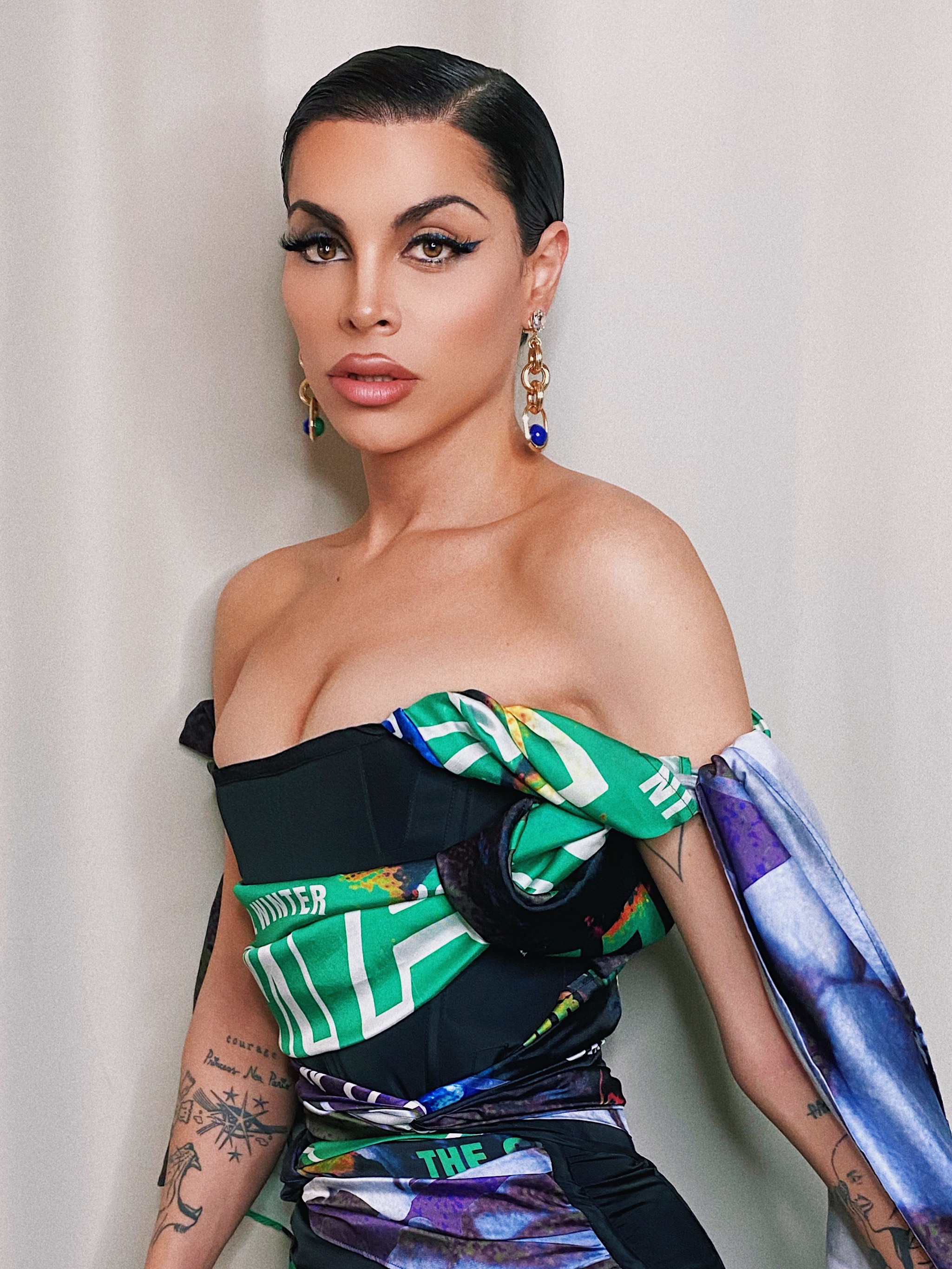
- Born: Carmen Jedet Izquierdo Sánchez; 7 July 1992 (age 33); Girona, Spain
- Occupations: Singer, actress, writer and LGBTI activist

Carmen Jedet Izquierdo Sánchez (born July 7, 1992), known simply as Jedet, is a Spanish actress, singer, Internet personality and transgender LGBT activist.

== Artistic career ==
In 2016, Jedet started to be known as King Jedet, mostly on social media through her activism and her YouTube channel. At the same time she published her first book, Mi último Regalo. In an interview that same year, with WAG1 Magazine, Jedet confessed her intention to transition as a transgender woman.

In 2017, Jedet began her music career by releasing a collaboration with Ms Nina on the song "Reinas".

She began her television career in supporting roles in Looser and Paquita Salas. In 2020, Jedet got the leading role in the Antena 3 Veneno playing Cristina Ortiz. She recorded a version of "Veneno pa tu piel" as the main theme of the series. For this television role she received the 2020 Ondas Award in the category of Best Female Performer in National Fiction.

== Private life ==
Although her parents are Andalusian and she grew up in Polícar, she was born in Girona and lived there for several years during her youth, so she speaks fluent Catalan. In particular, she was raised in l’Escala and attended primary and secondary school in Torroella de Montgrí.

== Filmography ==
Year	Títle	Channel	Character	Episodes
2018	Looser	Flooxer	Xadette	3 episodes
2019	Paquita Salas	Netflix	Paris	2 episodes
2020	Veneno	Atresplayer Premium	La Veneno	3 episodes
2021	Cardo	Atresplayer Premium	Dolores	1 episode
2022	Drag Race España	Atresplayer Premium	Herself	1 episode
2022	Mujeres Asesinas	ViX+	Paula	1 episode

== Awards ==
Year	Award	Category	Work	Result	Ref.
2020	Ondas Awards	Best female performer in national fiction	Veneno	Won	
2020	Hoy Magazine Awards	2020 Pledge	Veneno	Nominated	
2021	Hoy Magazine Awards	Best look of the year	Makeup: Miss Diamondz Hairdresser: Rafael Bueno	Won	

== Discography ==
- La leona (mixtape, 2018)
- LOS HOMBRES A LOS QUE HE TENIDO QUE OLVIDAR (2022)

== Publications ==
- Sánchez, Jedet (2016). Mi último regalo : diario de un corazón abierto en canal. Ediciones Hidroavión. ISBN 978-84-945306-8-5. OCLC 962816965.
- Efecto Mariposa. PLAN B. 2020. ISBN 9788417809232. OCLC 962816965.
