= Penélope Guerrero =

Spanish actress (born 1997)

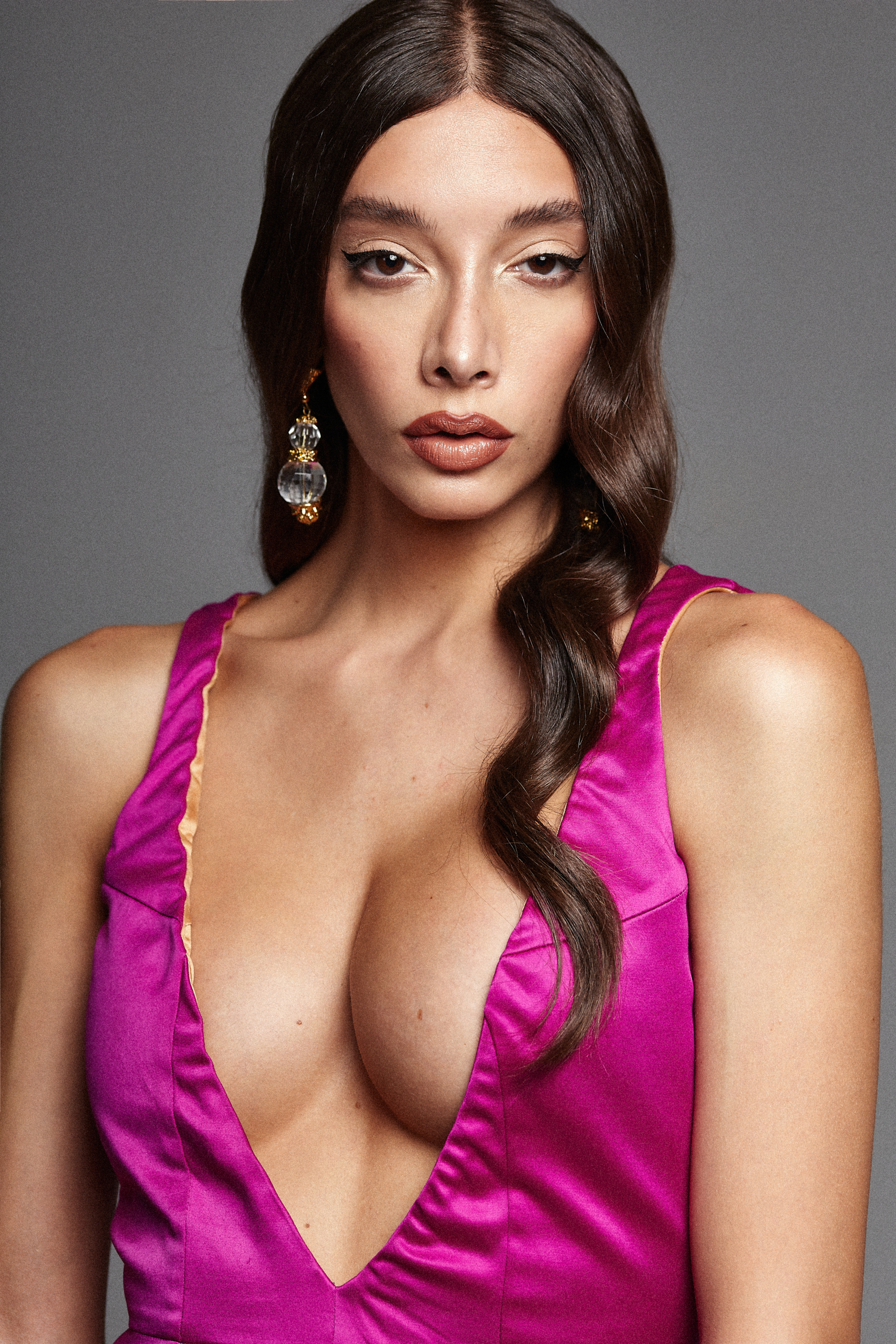
- Born: April 28, 1997 (age 28); Jerez de la Frontera, Spain
- Other names: Penélope Tacones
- Occupations: Actress, model, YouTuber and transgender rights activist

YouTube information
- Channel: Penélope Guerrero
- Years active: 2015–present
- Genre: Vlogs
- Subscribers: 239 thousand
- Views: 9.7 million
- Last updated: October 21, 2024

Penelope Guerrero (born April 28, 1997) is a Spanish actress. She has appeared in Netflix's Sky Rojo, in TVE's Mercado central, in Antena 3's Los hombres de Paco, and in the series Nacho, from AtresPlayer and Lionsgate+. During her early adulthood, she used social media to raise visibility and normalize transgender people in Spain.

== Biography ==
At 18 years old, she moved to Madrid to pursue a Double Degree in Journalism and Audiovisual Communication at the Universidad Carlos III. Concurrently, she began her transition. She decided to change her profession to study makeup in Barcelona.

In April 2021, she gave a TED Talk in Granada titled What is it to be a woman?.

In 2023, her participation was announced in the television series Nacho, as the character of Lady, and Vestidas de azul.

== Filmography ==
=== Cinema ===
Year	Film	Character	Notes
2024	Transmitzvah	Mumy Singer	

=== Television ===
Year	Series	Channel	Character	Duration
2020	Mercado central	La 1	María	8 episodes
2021	Los hombres de Paco	Antena 3		1 episode
2021 - 2023	Sky Rojo	Netflix	Tsunami	17 episodes
2023	Nacho	laSexta	Lady	7 episodes
2023 - 2024	Vestidas de azul	Atresplayer Premium	Nacha	7 episodes

2026 Perfil falso ~Netflix ~Noa~ 11 episodes

== Awards ==
- Premio Arcoiris (14/06/2024).
