= Daniela Santiago =

Spanish actress

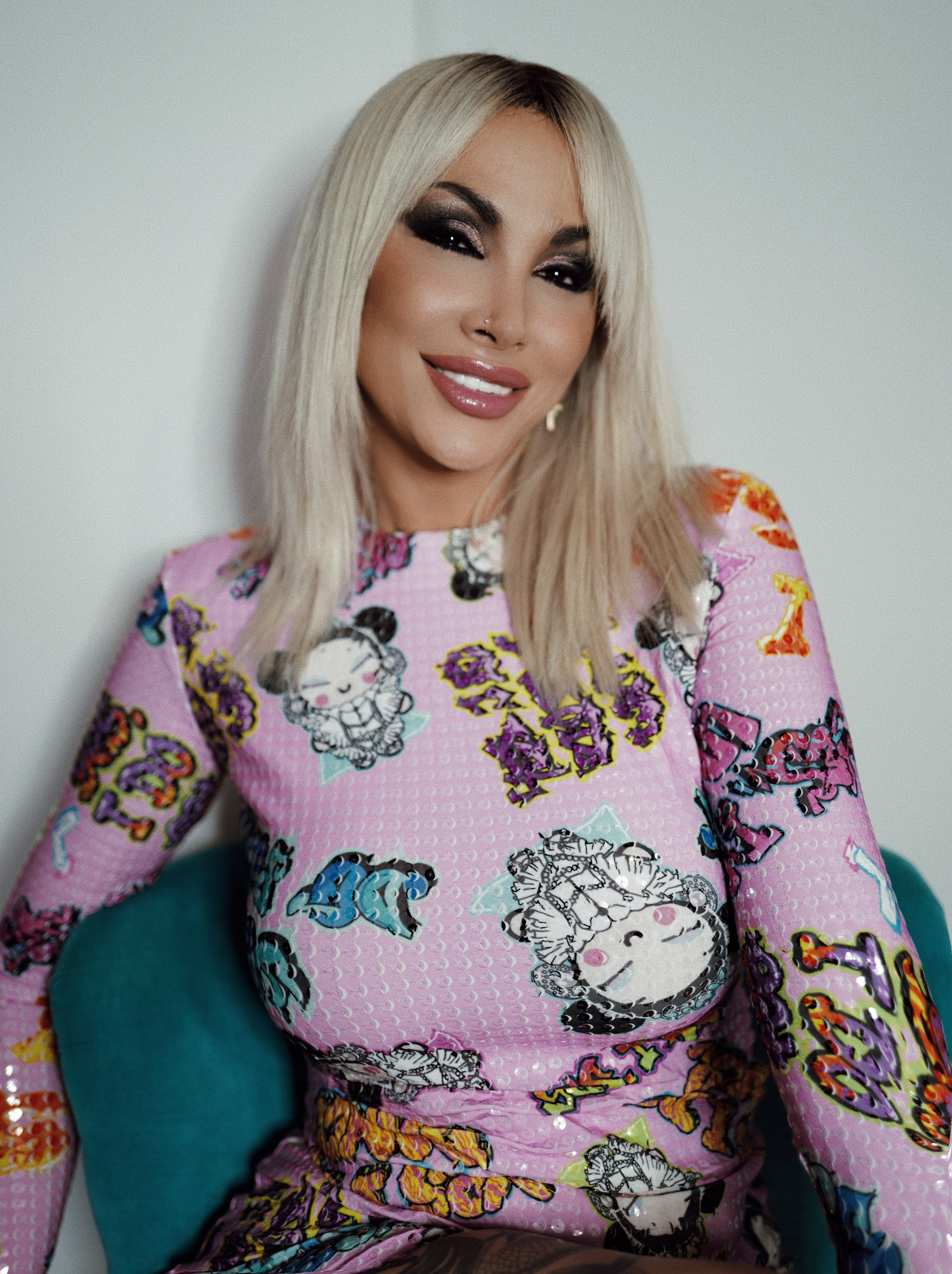
- Santiago in 2020
- Born: Daniela Santiago Villena; 1 April 1982 (age 43); Málaga, Spain
- Occupations: Actress and model

Daniela Santiago Villena (born 1 April 1982) is a Spanish transgender model and actress. She is known for playing Cristina "La Veneno" in the biopic series Veneno (2020), for which she was awarded an Ondas Award.

== Biography ==
Daniela Santiago Villena was born on 1 April 1982, in Málaga, Spain. Shortly before she turned 18, she settled in Madrid and began her career as a model. Later, she lived in Málaga, working as a professional makeup artist until a friend encouraged her to apply for the casting of the series about La Veneno.

Her first television job was a leading role in Veneno, an Atresmedia series created by Javier Ambrossi and Javier Calvo about the life of "La Veneno". She found out about the casting call for this television project through a friend in Barcelona. She was discovered in the casting opened by Eva Leira and Yolanda Serrano, who selected her for the great physical resemblance she had with "La Veneno" at the time she became famous in the program Esta noche cruzamos el Mississippi on Telecinco. In the series, she played Cristina in the middle years of her life, sharing the starring role with actresses Jedet and Isabel Torres. For this television role, she received the Ondas 2020 Award in the category of best female performer in national fiction, as well as a nomination for best leading actress in a series at the Feroz Awards and another for best female performance in a series at the Forqué Awards. Subsequently, she participated in two episodes of the series ByAnaMilán.

In support of trans visibility, she starred in the short film Julia, written and directed by Miguel Ángel Olivares, in January 2021. In April of the same year, it was announced that she was cast in Madres paralelas, directed by Pedro Almodóvar, which was released in theaters in September of the same year.

In 2022, she participated as a guest in an episode of the second season of Drag Race España. In the same year, she participated in the talent show Masterchef Celebrity 7.

== Filmography ==
=== Cinema ===
Year	Títle	Character	Director	Notes
2021	Julia	Julia	Miguel Ángel Olivares	Short film
2021	Madres paralelas	Model	Pedro Almodóvar	
TBA	Alma. Verano 1981	Marc Romero	Pre-producción	

=== Television ===
==== Television series ====
Year	Title	Character	Channel	Duration
2020	Veneno	Cristina Ortiz "La Veneno"	Atresplayer Premium	6 episodes
2020 – 2021	ByAnaMilán	Herself	Atresplayer Premium	2 episodes

==== Television programs ====
Year	Title	Channel	Role
2022	Drag Race España	Atresplayer Premium	Guest

== Awards and nominations ==
Year	Award	Category	Nominated work	Resulta	Ref.
2020	Ondas Awards	Best female performer in national fiction	Veneno	Won	
2020	HOY Magazine Awards	Best Actress of the Year 2020	Veneno	Won	
2021	José María Forqué Awards	Best actress in a television series	Veneno	Nominated	
2021	Feroz Awards	Best Main Actress in a Series	Veneno	Nominated	
