= Polyamory for Dummies =

2021 Spanish-French comedy film

- Film poster
- Spanish: Poliamor para principiantes
- Directed by: Fernando Colomo
- Written by: Marina Maesso; Casandra Macías; Fernando Colomo
- Produced by: Álvaro Longoria
- Starring: Karra Elejalde; María Pedraza; Quim Àvila; Toni Acosta; Lola Rodríguez; Eduardo Rosa; Cristina Gallego; Luis Bermejo; Inma Cuevas
- Production companies: Morena Films; Acuerdo de Fluidos AIE; Ran Entertainment
- Distributed by: Vértice Cine (es)
- Release dates: 20 April 2021 (BCN Film Fest); 21 May 2021 (Spain)
- Countries: Spain; France
- Language: Spanish

Polyamory for Dummies (Spanish: Poliamor para principiantes) is a 2021 Spanish-French romantic comedy film directed by Fernando Colomo which stars Karra Elejalde, María Pedraza, Quim Àvila and Toni Acosta.

== Plot ==
The plot follows Manu, a YouTuber vowing to defend romantic love who falls romantically for Amanda, a free-spirited girl committed to several polyamorous intimate relationships. Manu's plot to be the only love in Amanda's life does not go according to plan.

== Cast ==
- Karra Elejalde as Satur
- María Pedraza as Amanda
- Quim Àvila as Manu
- Toni Acosta as Tina
- Lola Rodríguez as Claudia
- Eduardo Rosa as Álex
- Cristina Gallego as Marta
- Luis Bermejo as Esteban
- Inma Cuevas as Berta
- Susi Caramelo

== Production ==
The screenplay was penned by Fernando Colomo, Casandra Macías-Gago and Marina Maesso. A joint Spanish-French coproduction by Morena Films alongside Acuerdo de Fluidos AIE and Ran Entertainment, it had the participation of Amazon Prime Video, RTVE and Telemadrid, funding from ICAA and support from the Madrid regional administration.

It was shot in 2020 in locations of Madrid and Extremadura (including Navalmoral de la Mata and the resort-island of Valdecañas).

== Release ==
The film screened at the 5th BCN Film Fest on 20 April 2021. Distributed by Vértice Cine, it was theatrically released in Spain on 21 May 2021.

== Reception ==
Raquel Hernández Luján of HobbyConsolas gave the film 55 out of 100 points, considering the film to be "irregular", even if it featured a couple of hilarious sketches, also assessing that "despite trying to be very open-minded, the film has the classic structure of romantic comedies and feels dated".

Yago García of Cinemanía scored 3 out of 5 stars, considering that "the film's development is predictable and not all of its jokes work", "but Colomo has made it a likeable work".

== See also ==
- List of Spanish films of 2021
