= Samantha Hudson =

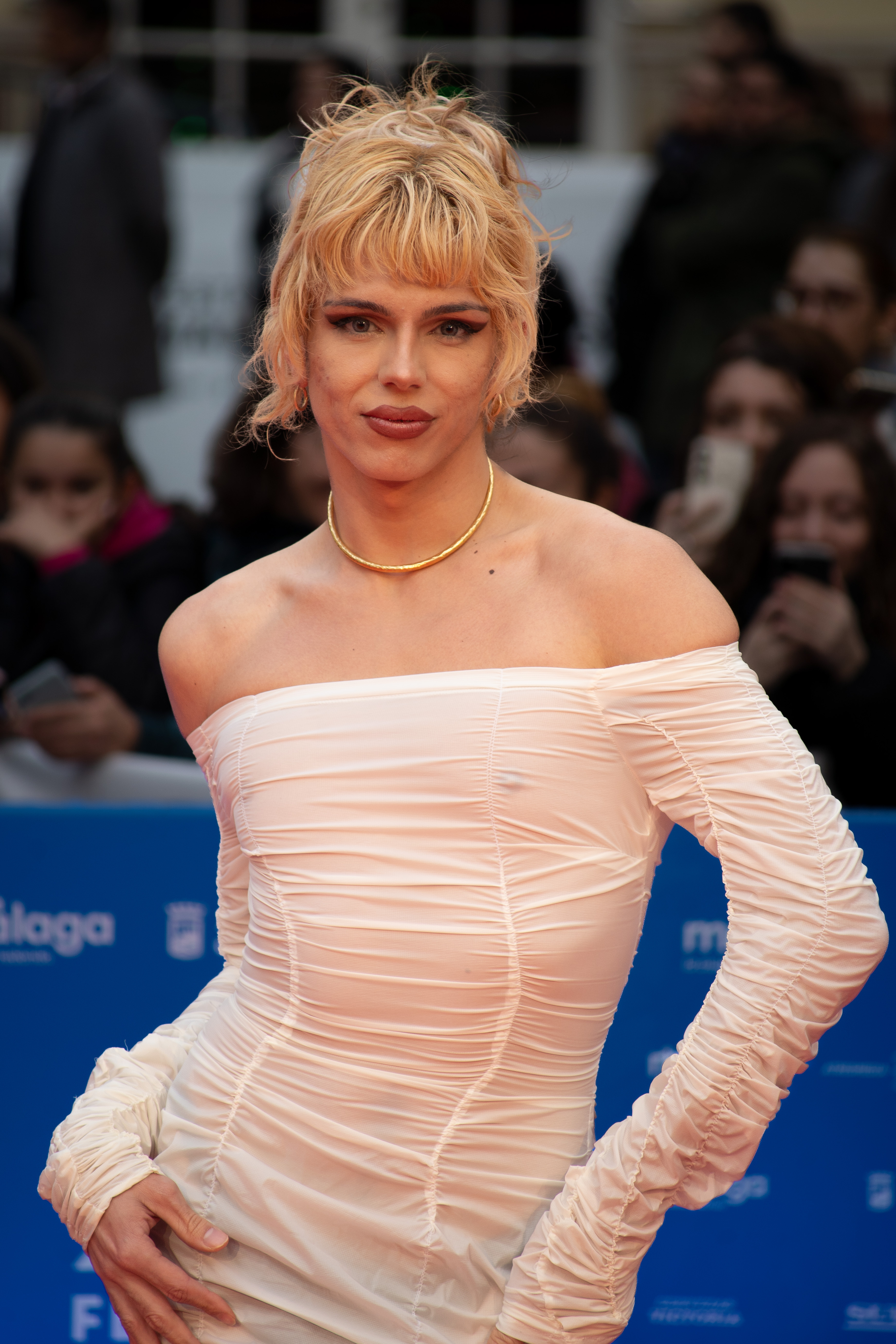
- Hudson in 2024

Background information
- Born: Iván González Ranedo; 11 September 1999 (age 27); León, Spain
- Genres: Pop, Electronic music, Electroclash
- Occupations: Singer, activist, multimedia artist, actress
- Years active: 2015–present
- Label: Subterfuge Records

Samantha Hudson (born 11 September 1999) is a Spanish artist, singer, actress, and internet celebrity.

== Biography ==
Hudson was born in León in 1999 and later relocated to Magaluf, Mallorca. When she was 11 years old, she went through a phase of religious devotion to the Catholic Church, but she would later become annoyed by the lack of respect of the LGBT community.

At 13 years old, Hudson began to realise she was a trans woman and began experimenting with different ideas of gender, which was followed by rejecting the idea. In a 2020 interview with El País, she stated that "[at that age] I liked my appearance when I fit into a female role [...] I just wanted to be like that." Samantha later stated in a 2022 interview for Vogue that the stage name "Samantha Hudson" came up as a suggestion from a friend in a conversation in which they fantasized about being "a suburban American mom who goes to pick up her kids in a seven-seater vehicle."

After graduating from high school in 2017, Samantha moved to Barcelona with the ambition of becoming a professional musician. That same year, during a trip to Seville, she injured herself climbing up a balcony, which led to her to be admitted to hospital for several weeks. She moved to Madrid in 2018.

On 11 May 2023, Hudson released the EP EVOO. The album was based on hardcore techno of the 1990s. At the beginning of October of that same year she was nominated for the MTV Europe Music Awards in the category of Best Spanish Artist. shortly after releasing the single "Chula", which was based on nineties house music. Samantha would win the award on 5 November 2023.

=== Music ===
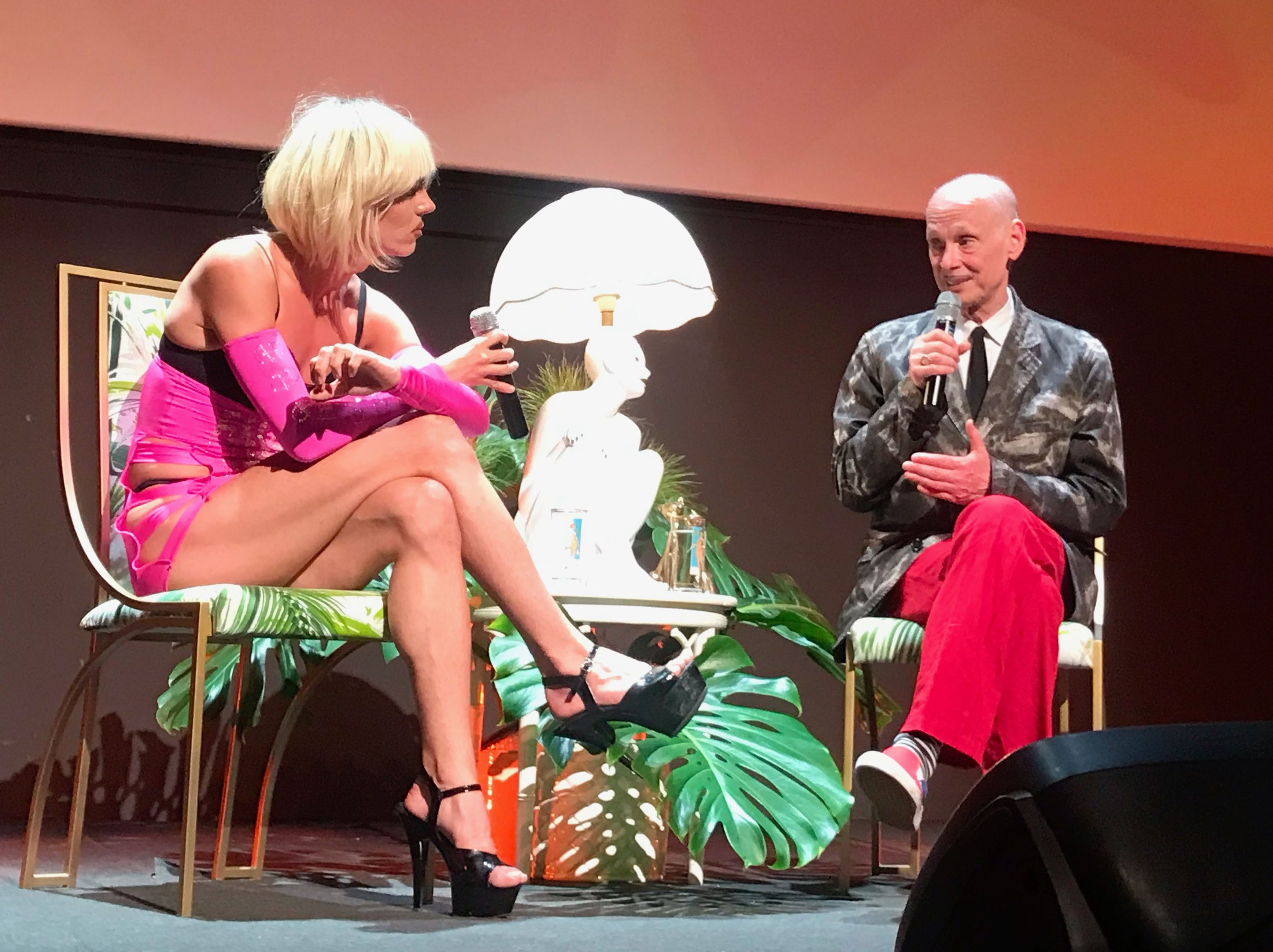
Samantha Hudson interviewing filmmaker John Waters at Primavera Pro 2022 in Barcelona

The moment I put on a crown, [this] is a political act. The moment I put on a princess backpack, I'm fighting against a system that oppresses me. And when I wear pink and go out on the street and get attention, I am fighting against a society that rejects me and denies me the right to enjoy my own life. Because I'm really in danger because I'm the way I am.

Hudson, in her graduation speech

In 2015, at age 15, Hudson made a video at the Josep Maria Llompart secondary school in Palma about audio-visual culture. Hudson created a song, within which she criticizes the Catholic Church and its beliefs regarding the LGBT community using foul language. The song, titled "Maricón," was posted on YouTube in October 2015. Hudson stated in interviews that, to produce the song, she was inspired by an experience visiting a church where she went to listen to The Song of the Sibyl; when entering the church, she described a negative reaction by parishioners with gazes.

As part of the school assignment, she received a grade of 9 out of 10 from her teacher, but the project was nonetheless reviewed by a faculty council. During the review, all the teachers reaffirmed their support for the project, except for the religion teacher, who decided to mobilize in protest against its publication. The teacher later complained in a blog post about what he described as Samantha's "insistent and repetitive" way of showcasing what he referred to as "effeminacy". He clashed with the rest of his colleagues, who insisted that the project was "simply impeccable." Finally, the teacher issued a public message to the broader Catholic community. The video would later be temporarily removed from YouTube and Samantha was excommunicated by the bishop of Mallorca. The then-deputy for Citizens political party in the Parliament of the Balearic Islands, Olga Ballester, described the video as "blasphemous" and complained about the lack of action by the Balearic government. Conservative social group HazteOír collected 48,000 signatures seeking for the teacher to be fired.

In 2024, Hudson was dropped as a spokesperson for Doritos due to Hudson's Twitter posts seeming to condone child abuse. She posted those tweets in 2014–2015, when she was between 14 and 15 years old. She responded to the controversy by saying that she was sorry and added "I didn't think that way and still don't think that way, at that age I thought making jokes about delicate topics made me cool."

== Personal life ==
Samantha does not describe herself as non-binary. In a 2021 interview, Hudson stated that she "could be included on the spectrum of non-binarism." In later interviews she has agreed with being addressed as Ivan and that she refers to herself as both male and female.

In an interview for the Heraldo de Aragón, which took place in the same year, she stated that "she cannot be pigeonholed into a musical or sexual genre". In October 2022, she announced that she is asexual. Hudson politically aligns herself as an "anti-capitalist and Marxist". In a 2020 interview for Vice magazine, she defined herself as a "drag queen" and "transvestite on call 24 hours a day".

In an interview for the television show Viajando con Chester in February 2023, Samantha recalled that she had had sexual intercourse as a minor and concluded retrospectively that she had been sexually abused.

== Discography ==
=== Studio albums ===
- 2021: Liquidación total
- 2025: Música para muñecas

=== EPs ===
- 2023: AOVE

=== Compilation albums ===
- 2019: Los Grandes Éxitos de Samantha

=== Singles ===
Title	Single
Maricón	2015
Super Preñada	2016
Burguesa Arruinada	2017
Seguro de moto	2019
Hazme el favor (vente conmigo a bailar)	2020
Dulce y Bautizada	2021
Disco Jet Lag (with La Prohibida)	2021
Guateque	2021
Por España	2021
Demasiado coño	2022
Perra (con La Dani)	2022
Otra vez	2023
Adicta al sonido	2023
Vodka Redbull	2023
Es lo que hay	2023
Chula	2023
Kanekalon	2024
Liturgia (with Zahara)	2024
Hot (Gimme More) (with La Zowi)	2025
Full Lace y el Tuck (with Villano Antillano)	2025

== Tours ==
- 2021-2022: Gira Liquidación total
- 2022-2023: Gira Liquidación total por cierre
- 2023-2024: Gira AOVE Black Lavel
- 2025: Música para muñecas

== Filmography ==
=== Film ===
Year	Title	Character	Director	Notes	Ref.
2018	Samantha Hudson, una historia de fe, sexo y electroqueer	Herself	Joan Porcel	Documentary film	
2021	¡Corten!	Herself	Marc Ferrer		
2022	Rainbow	Ingrid	Paco León		

=== Television ===
Year	Title	Character	Channel	Notes	Ref.
2017	Mai neva a ciutat	Herself	IB3	Episode: «Fantasmes de la vella escola»	
2020	Veneno	Librarian	Atresplayer Premium	Episode: «Los tres entierros de Cristina Ortiz»	
2021	Una Navidad con Samantha Hudson	Samantha Hudson	Atresplayer Premium	Television film	

Year	Title	Channel	Notes	Ref.
2020 - 2022	¿Sigues ahí?	Netflix	Presenter	
2021	MasterChef Celebrity España	La 1	Contestant	
2021	Amor con Fianza: El reencuentro	Netflix	Presenter	
2022	Crímenes online	Flooxer	Presenter	
2022	Sálvame Fashion Week	Telecinco	Jury	
2022	Sálvame Mediafest	Telecinco	Jury	

== Theatre ==
Year	Title	Director	Notes	Ref.
2021	Eutanasia Deluxe	Herself	Musical	
