= Paca la Piraña =

Spanish actress and vedette

Paca La Piraña
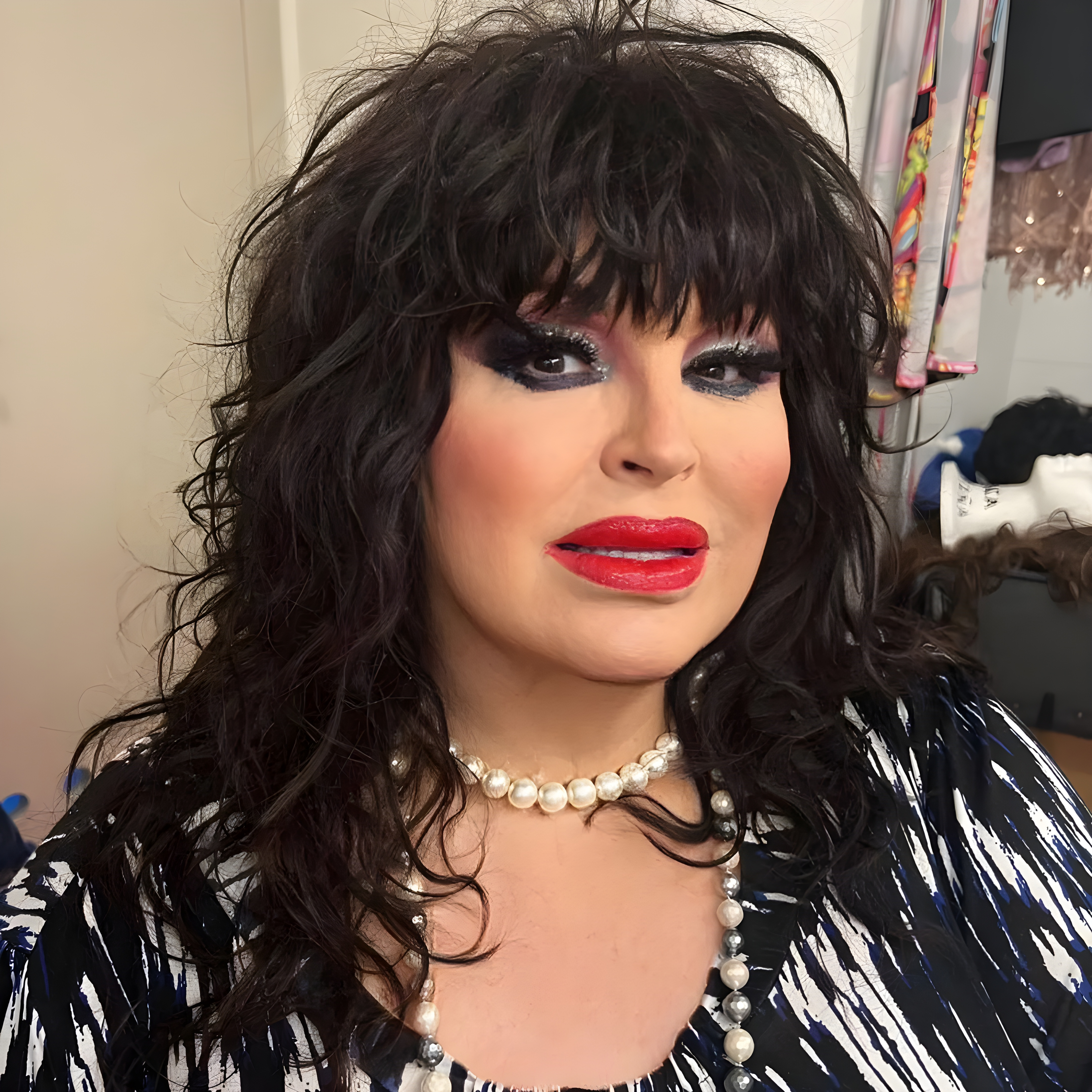
- Paca la Piraña in 2022
- Born: Francisca Aracil Cáceres; June 1, 1962 (age 63); Almería, Andalusia, Spain
- Occupations: Television personality; cabaret artist; actress; comedian; presenter

Francisca Aracil Cáceres (born June 1, 1962), professionally known as Paca la Piraña, is a Spanish actress and vedette. She is a trans woman.

== Career ==
La Piraña began her career in the 1980s, when she performed in nightclubs while imitating musical acts. In the 1990s, she moved to Elda, Valencian Community, for work, where she dedicated herself to cross-dressing. Later, she became more widely known in Spain after her introduction on television as the friend of La Veneno, a fellow Spanish actress and performer.

In 2020, she returned to the public eye by appearing as herself in Veneno, a TV series aired on Atresmedia about the life of La Veneno. In 2023, a third part of Veneno was announced, called Piraña, that would focus on her life.

Due to the popularity of Veneno, she and the other protagonists were honored during the 2020 Madrid Pride. In 2021, a subsequent miniseries, Paca la Piraña, ¿dígame?, was aired, starring La Piraña. Later that same year, she featured in Paca te lleva al huerto, a series where she interviewed Spanish celebrities about various topics.

In December 2020, she was a guest presenter alongside Marc Giró on Feliz Año Neox. In 2021, she was a guest judge on the first season of Drag Race España. From 2021 to 2023, she toured with Supremme de Luxe and Drag Race España contestants as part of the stage production El Gran Hotel de Las Reinas.

== Personal life ==
La Piraña was born in Almería, Spain. When she was seven, she and her family lived for a brief while in Germany. She lived in Marchalenes, Valencia, until 2017 when she returned to her hometown of Almería to take care of her mother.

She first met La Veneno after they met during a performance at a nightclub in Torremolinos, but it wasn't until three years later at that they met again, this time at a park in Madrid.

== Filmography ==
=== Film ===
Year	Title	Notes
2020	El Claroscuro	Short film

=== Television series ===
Year	Title	Role	Notes
2020	Veneno	Paca la Piraña	Principal role; 8 episodes
2023	Vestidas de azul	Paca la Piraña	Principal role; 7 episodes
2025	Piraña	Paca la Piraña	Principal role; 13 episodes

=== Television programmes ===
Year	Title	Role
2010	Sálvame Deluxe	Guest
2020	El hormiguero	Guest
2020	Paca la Piraña, ¿dígame?	Presenter
2020	Preuvas Neox	Presenter
2021	Ilustres ignorantes	Guest
2021	Drag Race España	Guest Judge
2021	Paca te lleva al huerto	Presenter
2022	Sábado Deluxe	Guest
2023	La última noche	Guest

=== Theater ===
Role	Title	Notes
2021	El Gran Hotel de las Reinas	Receptionist
2022	El Gran Hotel de las Reinas	Receptionist
2023	El Gran Hotel de las Reinas	As herself
