= Pepe Navarro (journalist) =

Spanish journalist and TV presenter

- Born: José Navarro Prieto; 16 November 1951 (age 74); Palma del Río, Córdoba
- Occupations: Journalist; TV host TV producer Writer
- Spouses: Eva Zaldívar (m. 1987; div. 2003) Lorena Aznar (m. 2008; div. 2017)

José Navarro Prieto (Palma del Río, Córdoba; November 16, 1951), better known as Pepe Navarro, is a Spanish television presenter, journalist, television producer, and writer who has worked in television, journalism, and radio.

== Biography ==
Born to Granadian parents, when he was just two years old, his family moved to Sabadell. At the age of 10, they traveled to France, only to return to Sabadell at the age of 11. There, he began his high school studies at the Salesian Sant Oleguer School, which he abandoned at the age of 15 to work. Two years later, at 17, he completed his higher education —5th, 6th, and COU— at Jaime Balmes Institute in Barcelona, self-financing himself as an employee of El Corte Inglés selling fans, giving math and gymnastics classes, working as a waiter, DJ, footballer, etc.

He studied Scriptwriting, Writing, and Broadcasting at the Radio School of Radio Juventud in Barcelona, where he produced his first half-hour weekly program, "Welcome to Music", and collaborated in others. At the same time, he enrolled in the first year of Law at the Autonomous University of Barcelona, in Bellaterra.

He went for military service, and during his stay at the Berga barracks in Barcelona, he hitchhiked clandestinely in the afternoons, covering the 50 kilometers that separated him from Manresa. At Radio Manresa, he covered his four-hour shift daily on FM. And on Sundays, he occupied the entire afternoon programming on Medium Wave.

After completing military service in September 1974, he returned to Sabadell and enrolled in the first year of Journalism and the second year of Law at the Autonomous University of Barcelona.

== Professional career ==
=== Radio ===
Navarro's first programs began after studying Scriptwriting, Writing, and Broadcasting at the Radio School of Radio Juventud in Barcelona. It was there that he presented and produced his first program, "Bienvenidos a la Música", on a weekly basis.

In January 1975, upon returning from military service, he directed, produced, and presented "Hora 13" on Radio Sabadell, a daily music program. In November 1975, he joined EAJ1 Radio Barcelona, Cadena SER, where he presented "Bienvenidos a casa", a program that aired every Sunday after Carrusel Deportivo.

He remained at Radio Barcelona until July 1980. During this time, he directed and presented "El Despertador", a program from 7 to 8 in the morning, and from that time on, he participated in the news program "Matinal Cadena Ser", which aired immediately after his program, "Los 40 Principales", "Pepe Show", a specialized music program on Saturday nights; "El Retrovisor", a daily program investigating recent Spanish history, and "La Radio", a daily program from 9 pm to 11 pm. During the summers of 1978 and 1979, he hosted the Sunday programs "The Sun, the Sea, the Goldfish" and "It's 5 o'clock in the afternoon."

At the same time, starting in September 1977, he created his own production company and commercialized the two and a half hours he purchased from Radio Sabadell. Every day, once finished, at 8:30, the programs "El Despertador" and "Matinal Cadena Ser" on Radio Barcelona, he moved the 20 km that separated Barcelona from Sabadell to present "Viva la Radio" at 9:30, receiving several awards and special recognition for the live broadcast, in a children's morning show, of the screening of the movie "The Jungle Book".

In September 1980, he joined Radio Peninsular de Radio Nacional de España and took over the mornings, from 6 to 8, directing and presenting the program "Buenos días", while also continuing "Viva la Radio" on Radio Sabadell. In the summer of 1981, each regional center of RNE designated a representative to participate in the program "La Radio rueda", which aired nationwide. Each of the chosen ones took charge of directing and presenting the broadcast of two of the programs out of more than thirty that aired during July and August of that year. The intention was to find, among all of them, who should occupy the position that Luis del Olmo would vacate in the program "Protagonistas" starting in September. Pepe Navarro was chosen, but ten days before starting the new journey, Luis del Olmo returned to his position. He remained at Radio Peninsular de Barcelona until the summer of 1982.

In 1983, he worked at Antena 3 Radio in Madrid and was director, scriptwriter, and presenter of a daily and a weekly program. On August 1 of the same year, he made his debut on TVE 1 in "La Tarde".

=== Television ===
Pepe Navarro made his television debut in the summer of 1983 with the program "La Tarde" on TVE's Primera. At the express request of the news management, he left "La Tarde", and since early January 1984, he has presented the "Telediario 1" on TVE. In just three months, the ratings soared, making it one of the most watched newscasts in the history of television. In April 1984, he returned to "La Tarde", where he achieved the highest audience ratings and popularity until he left in October.

In December of the same year, he signed with the Spanish International Network (now Univision), the Spanish-speaking network in the US, and in January 1985, "La Noche con Pepe Navarro" began airing nationwide, which he presented until January 1986. During this time, he co-presented with Mario Moreno "Cantinflas" and Ricardo Montalbán, the 24-hour Telemarathon "Por México" broadcast live from Los Angeles to all Spanish-speaking countries. The "Telemarathon" "Por ti, Colombia", a 12-hour event, which he also hosted from New York, had the same coverage. He also hosted the OTI Festival edition of the same year.

In 1987 and 1988, he lived in New York and Los Angeles, where he worked in directing, production, and creativity with various American advertising, film, and television production companies.

In 1989, Pepe Navarro returned to Spain to host the weekly show "Por fin es viernes" on Canal Sur Television in Andalusia.

In the fall of 1989, he returned to TVE and directed and presented the morning show "El día por delante", a four-hour daily program from 10 am to 2 pm, which marked the television debut of Javier Bardem, Santi Millán, Santiago Urrialde, Nuria González, and José Corbacho. He was awarded the TP de Oro for the best entertainment program and Navarro itself as presenter. The program ended in March 1990. Between 1991 and 1992, he hosted the weekly program "Let's Play Trivial".

In the 1992–93 season, he began his tenure at Antena 3 TV, during which he directed, produced, and presented the program "Vivir, vivir... qué bonito." He brought back González and introduced Carlos Iglesias, Maribel Ripoll, Ferrán Botifoll, Dani Delacámara, and Aitor Mazo to television. Within a few weeks, it became the unquestionable and unbeatable leader of the mornings against TVE, Tele 5, and the autonomous television networks, and continued to be so for the next two seasons. For administrative reasons, in the 1993–1994 season, the program's name was changed to "Todo va bien".

In the 1994–95 season, in addition to the daily morning show, he produced, directed, and presented "Estamos todos locos", a weekly late-night show that averaged over 32% ratings, also leading in its time slot. In this program, Santiago Urrialde joined as "Rambo" and "El Reportero Total", and Santiago Segura as a scriptwriter. Both programs only ran until December 1994. "Estamos todos locos" due to its references to Jordi Pujol, especially at that time, and "Todo va bien ...", for complex reasons that Pepe Navarro explains in his book "La Leyenda del Mississippi".

In those final four months of 1994, "Pepelu" was born, a character played by Carlos Iglesias, who was a fictional son of Navarro, his name being a pun on Terelu, daughter of María Teresa Campos.

However, Antena 3 TV commissioned Pepe Navarro to host the second edition of "El gran juego de la oca", the prime-time leader on Saturdays from January to June 1995.

In early July 1995, he joined Tele 5 for the mornings. But after a series of conversations with Mikel Lejarza, Director of Programs, on September 18, 1995, "Esta noche cruzamos el Mississippi" was launched, the program that revolutionized television in Spain and opened up a non-existent time slot, the midnight slot.

The success of "Esta noche cruzamos el Mississippi" was overwhelming. In the Ondas Awards ceremony, he won in 1996, the jury president, Carlos Abad, announced it as follows: "Esta noche cruzamos el Mississippi presents a new concept of entertainment, extends prime time into the night, establishes a new format in our country, and has become an important social phenomenon."

In the only two seasons (1995–1997) that "Esta noche cruzamos el Mississippi" lasted, it reached ratings that no one had achieved before in the midnight slot.

In July 1997, he signed again with Antena 3 and, following the success of "Esta noche cruzamos el Mississippi," he produced, directed, and presented "La sonrisa del pelícano" from September, which was removed on December 1 of that same year.

In 1999, Telefónica rehired Pepe Navarro to experiment with interactivity on Via Digital from May 1999 to July 2000, under the name "La Vía Navarro, La VN", it was the world's first interactive program.

In 2002, he hosted the third edition of Gran Hermano, on Tele 5. In 2005–2006, he produced, directed, and presented "Ruffus & Navarro Unplugged" on TVE 1. In 2020, he participated in the Antena 3 program Mask Singer: Adivina quién canta In 2020, he served as the host of Ibiza in the TVE 1 program Dos parejas y un destino. In 2024, he visited El Hormiguero to promote his participation in the Antena 3 Television program El desafío.

== Private life ==
In December 1987, he married Eva Zaldívar, with whom he had a daughter, María del Carmen, born in 1988. They divorced in 2003. Later, in September 2008, he married Lorena Aznar.

== Accolades ==
Award	Year
Premio Pueblo a Mejor Presentador de Televisión	1983
Premio TP al Personaje más popular	1983
ACE Award, Mejor Presentador de Habla Hispana	1986
Premio TP Oro al Mejor Presentador	1989
Premio TP Oro Mejor Magazine	1995
MIDIA al mejor Talk show de Habla Hispana	1996
Premios Ondas Mejor Programa de Entretenimiento	1996
Antena de Oro	1996
TP de Oro al Mejor Programa de Actualidad	1996
