= Carnival of Las Palmas =

Annual carnival in Las Palmas, Spain

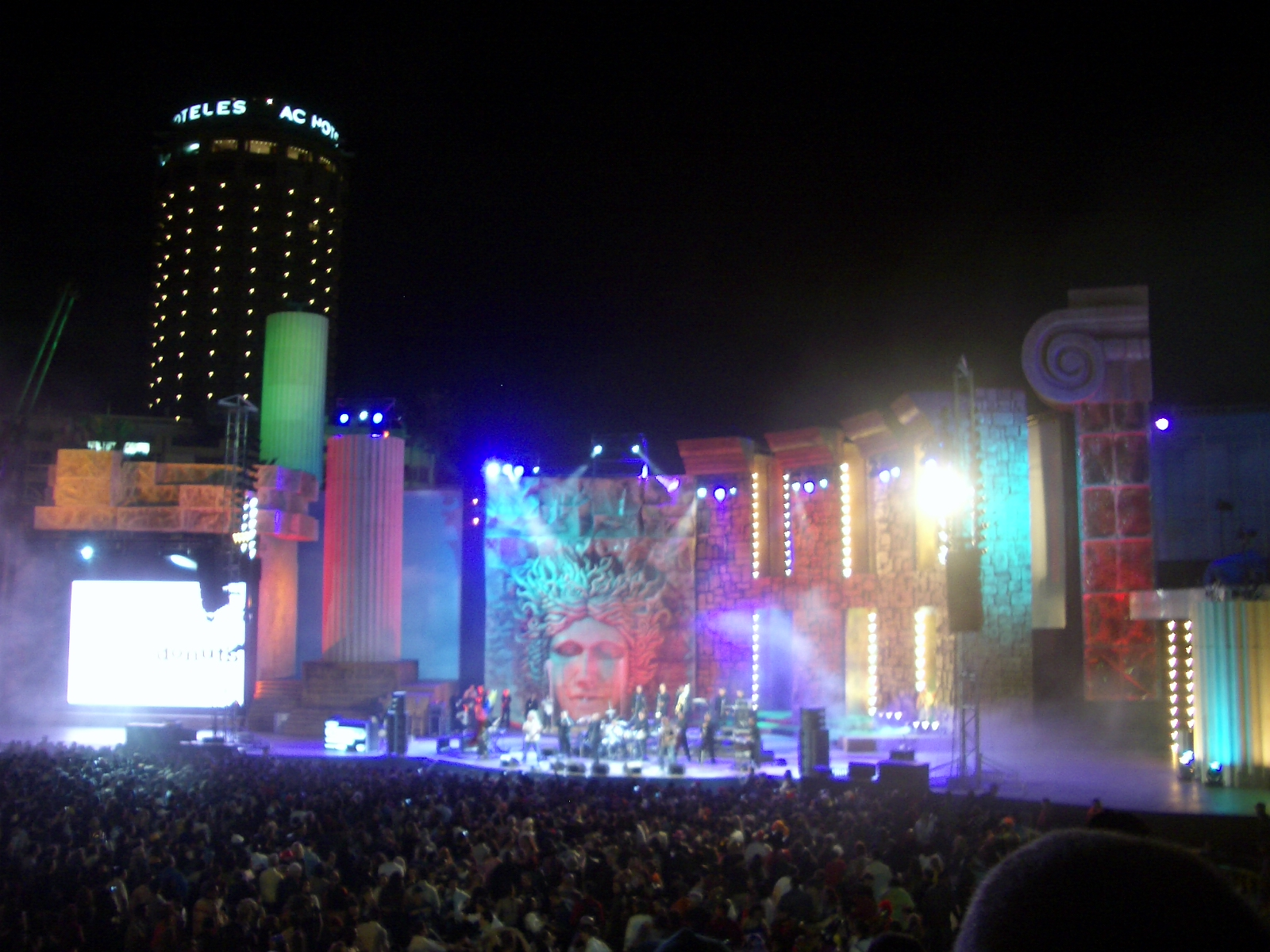
- One of the themed nights Carnival 2008: Salsa Night with Oscar D'León.
- Genre: Carnival
- Frequency: Annual
- Locations: Las Palmas, Spain

Fiesta of International Tourist Interest
- Designated: 2023

The Carnival of Las Palmas de Gran Canaria is one of the most famous carnivals of Spain. The event is celebrated every year in the month of February in Las Palmas de Gran Canaria.

In 2023 it was declared a Fiesta of International Tourist Interest, being the sixth carnival in Spain to achieve it after those of Santa Cruz de Tenerife, Cádiz (1980), Águilas (2015), Xinzo de Limia (2019) and Badajoz (2022).

== Events ==
The events include the Gala of the Queen and the Gala of the Drag Queen. The main Parade or Cavalcade is viewed by 200,000 people every year along a six kilometer route that runs through the city.

== Controversy ==
The Carnival of Las Palmas has been involved in polemic several times. In the past there was certain controversy because a band named Los Indianos coming from the town of Santa Cruz de La Palma wanted to join the Carnival of Las Palmas, or joining the Carnival of Las Palmas of so-called "Carnaval de Día" which belongs to Carnival of Santa Cruz de Tenerife and to use the same model of retransmission of Tenerife.

== Gala of the Drag Queen ==
The Gala of the Drag Queen is an event of the Carnival of Las Palmas de Gran Canaria. It consists of a concert and a television show in which the main event is a pageant of drag queens, enlivened with other performances of singers and dance numbers. The carnivals of Las Palmas de Gran Canaria included this show for the first time in 1998, and with the passage of time, it has become one of the most popular events of the festivities. In the drag queens contest, the artistic talent, the dance, and the interpretation of a musical number are valued. The contest participants act three minutes over the stage of the Santa Catalina Park. Days before the Gala a pre-selection is held in which the best candidates are chosen to perform at the Gala. In the contest rules there is no gender limitation or sexual orientation, although the participants are mostly gay men. The pageant is broadcast by the Spanish national public channel RTVE.
