= Isabel Torres =

Spanish actress (1969–2022)

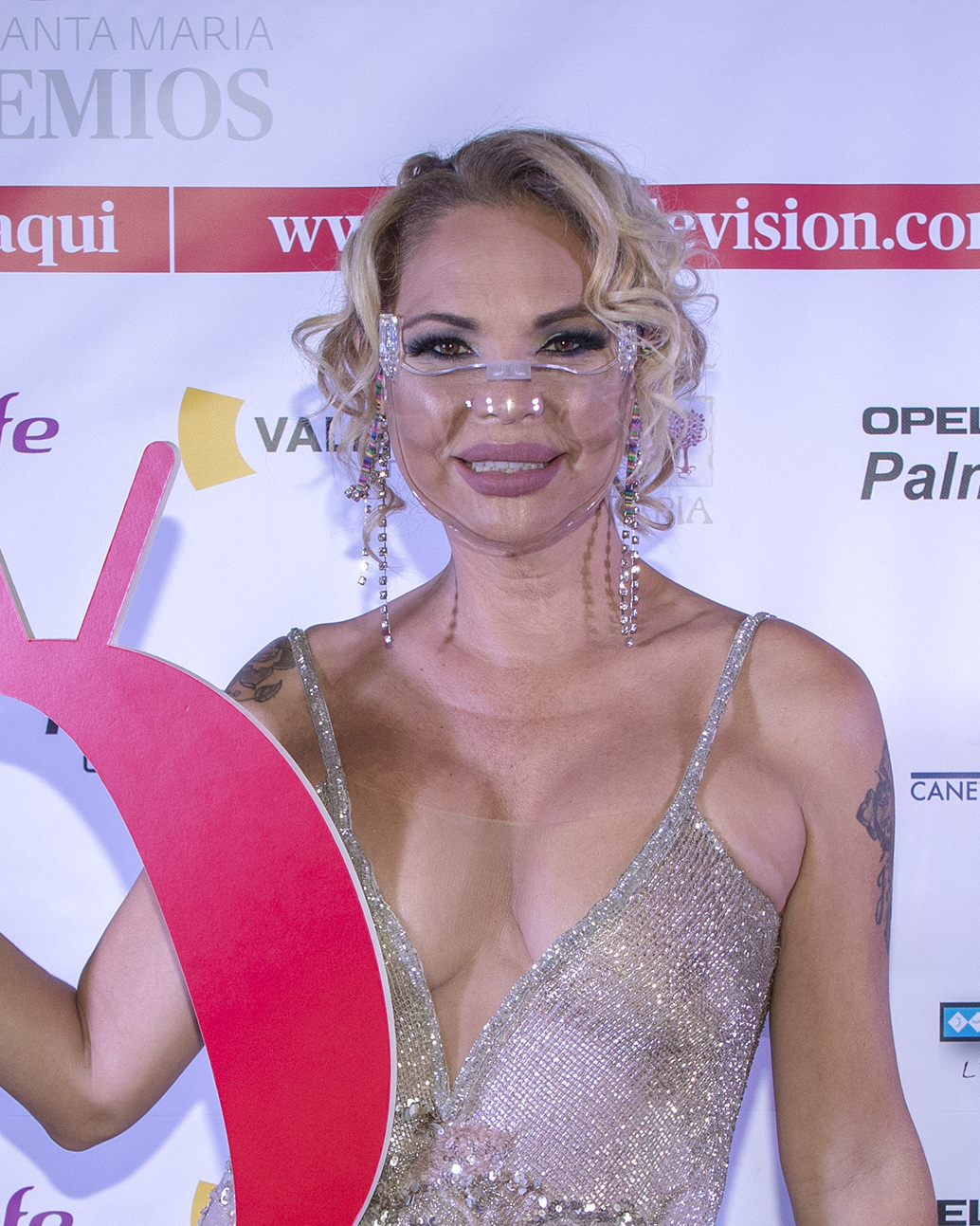
- Isabel Torres
- Born: 14 July 1969; Las Palmas, Spain
- Died: 11 February 2022 (aged 52); Las Palmas, Spain
- Occupations: Actress; radio presenter; television presenter

Isabel Torres (14 July 1969 – 11 February 2022) was a Spanish television and radio presenter, talk show host and actress. She was also a businesswoman and LGBT rights activist.

== Career ==
In 2005, Torres was the first transgender candidate for Queen of the Carnival of Las Palmas, as well as the first Canarian transsexual who in 1996 was able to adapt her DNI for her gender identity. The following year, she was on the cover of Interviú magazine.

Torres participated in television programs such as Channel Nº 4, El programa de Ana Rosa and DEC. She also presented the Antena 3 Canarias program Nos vamos pa la playa (We are going to the beach) in 2010. Her first role in a television series was a leading role in Atresmedia's Veneno, created by Javier Ambrossi and Javier Calvo about the life of La Veneno. For this television role, she received the 2020 Ondas Award in the category of Best Female Performer in National Fiction.

On 12 December 2020, she received the Charter 100 Gran Canaria Award, in recognition of her professional career in radio and television.

== Illness and death ==
In March 2020, Torres announced that she was suffering from metastatic lung cancer. She was appointed ambassador of the Grupo Canario de Cáncer de Pulmón in the same year. In January 2021, she announced that she had suffered a relapse of her disease, and was treated at the Hospital Universitario Insular de Gran Canaria. She died in Las Palmas on 11 February 2022, at the age of 52.

== Filmography ==
=== Film ===
Year	Title	Notes
1996	Fotos	Secondary role
2008	Camino a la locura	Feature film
2010	Los brazos de Venus	Short film
2021	8 Años	Short film

=== Television ===
Year	Title	Role
2010	Nos vamos pa la playa	Presenter
2020	Veneno	La Veneno
2021	E.L.I.	Lion
