= La Veneno =

Spanish media personality (1964–2016)

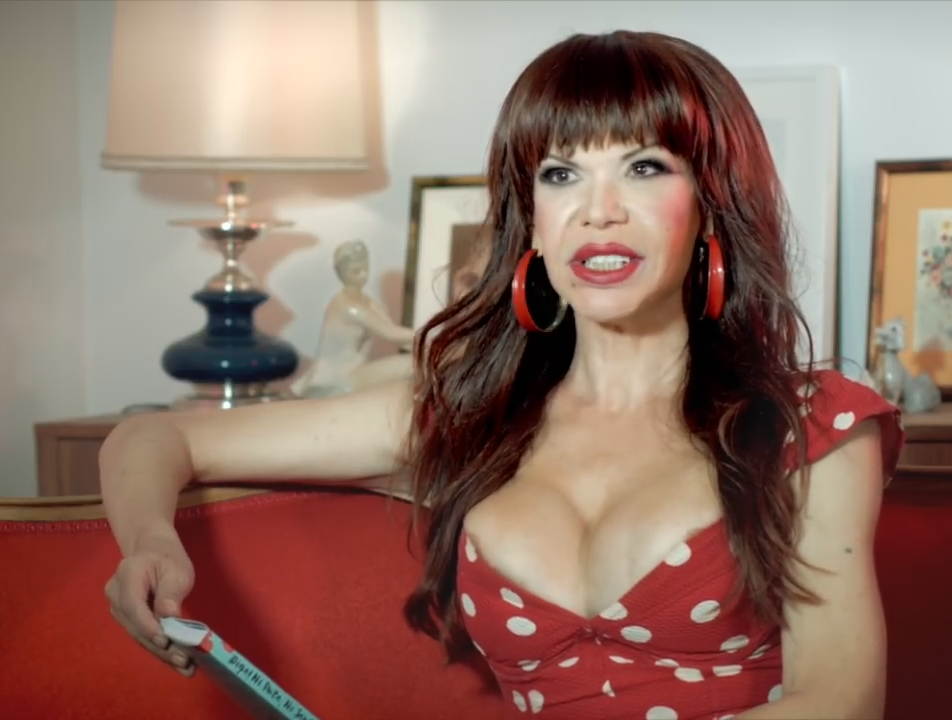
- Ortiz in October 2016
- Born: 19 March 1964; Adra, Almería, Spain
- Died: 9 November 2016 (aged 52); Hospital Universitario La Paz, Madrid, Spain
- Monuments: Honor plaque at Parque del Oeste
- Other names: Cristina La Veneno, Cristina Ortiz Rodríguez
- Occupations: Vedette; singer; actress; model
- Years active: 1996–2016
- Known for: Esta noche cruzamos el Mississippi
- Notable work: ¡Digo! Ni puta ni santa. Las memorias de La Veneno

Cristina Ortiz Rodríguez (19 March 1964 – 9 November 2016), better known as La Veneno ('The She Poison'), was a Spanish singer, actress, sex worker, and media personality. Considered one of the more important LGBT icons in Spain since her death, she rose to fame in 1996 after being discovered in the park where she worked as a sex worker by Faela Sainz, a reporter for the late-night talk show Esta noche cruzamos el Mississippi, broadcast on Telecinco from 1995 to 1997 and hosted by the journalist Pepe Navarro. She later appeared regularly on the show as well as on La sonrisa del pelícano.

Recognised for her appearance and profane humor, La Veneno was one of the earliest transgender women to become widely-known in Spain, and has been recognised as a pioneering trans icon. In 2020, a critically acclaimed series produced by Atresmedia following her life became a hit show in Spain.

== Early life ==
La Veneno was born in Adra, Spain, into a family of six children, the child of José María Ortiz López (1930–2020) and María Jesús Rodríguez Rivera (born 1932). She noted from an early age that she was different from other children. According to her own testimony, she suffered aggression and abuse from people in her hometown and from her own family, who did not accept her gender identity and sexual orientation. From an early age, she showed an interest in fashion, designing clothes and organizing fashion shows in Adra, attaining a certain level of local notoriety. She also attended hairdressing school in Granada.

At age 13, she moved with one of her sisters to San Pedro de Alcántara with the Romero family, after her parents kicked them both out of their house. There she worked as a farmer and a shop assistant as well as a hairdresser and a model. In 1989, she won the contest for Míster Andalucía.

== Career ==
In 1991, she left Marbella for Madrid, where she worked as a hospital chef. The same year, she appeared on the television dating show Vivan los novios, which she won. The prize was a voyage to Bangkok alongside Charo, the partner she found on the show. There, in Thailand, she attended a kathoey show where she realized that she was transgender. Thus, in 1992, she started her process of transition. After being fired from her job at the hospital, she worked as a sex worker in the Parque del Oeste in Madrid to pay her bills. There she was discovered in April 1996 by reporter Faela Saiz, who interviewed her for a TV feature on prostitution for the late-night show Esta noche cruzamos el Mississippi on Telecinco. The interview, showcasing La Veneno's outrageous humour, was a hit. The show's host, Pepe Navarro, subsequently invited her to become a regular contributor. Her rise to fame was almost immediate, and she helped the program reach viewing figures of almost eight million. The show ended in July 1997 after political conflicts surrounding the Alcàsser Girls crime and moved to Antena 3 under the name La sonrisa del pelícano. El Pelícano ended in December 1997 after three months of broadcasting after numerous rumors that a sex tape starring journalist and entrepreneur Pedro J. Ramírez would be aired on television.

In 1996, La Veneno recorded two singles, "Veneno pa' tu piel" and "El rap de La Veneno", with the first one being gold-certified for selling over 50,000 copies, and her career as a vedette and a television personality took off. During the decade, she toured Spain, performing in galas and making personal appearances at nightclubs and festivals. She also modeled for designers like Pepe Rubio and Antonio Alvarado. When La sonrisa del pelícano ended, she spent a month doing TV work in Buenos Aires, before returning to Spain and participating in other programs for Telemadrid and Antena 3, among other channels. She also took part in two pornographic films, El secreto de La Veneno and La venganza de La Veneno. She also acted in six episodes of the series En plena forma, starring Alfredo Landa.

== Filmography ==
Year	Title
1997	El secreto de la Veneno La venganza de la Veneno

== Television ==
Year	Title	Role
1992	Long Live the Bride and Groom (Vivan los novios)	Contestant
1994	Encantada de la vida Testigo directo	Guest
1996-1997	Esta noche cruzamos el Mississippi	Panelist
1997	La sonrisa del pelicano	Panelist
1997	En plena forma	Guest
2000-2001	Mirame	Guest
2001	Tiempo al tiempo	Guest
2001-2003	Crónicas marcianas	Panelist
2006	TNT Salsa Rosa Aquí hay tomate	Guest
2006-2007	¿Dónde estás corazón?	Guest
2007	En antena	Guest
2009-2016	Sálvame Deluxe	Guest

== Music ==
Year	Title
1996	Veneno Pa Tu Piel El Rap de la Veneno

== Prison term ==
In April 2003, Cristina was implicated in a case of arson and insurance fraud, and she was reported to the police by her then-boyfriend Andrea Petruzzelli. She was accused of intentionally setting fire to her flat in order to claim the insurance money. Found guilty, she was sentenced to three years in prison at the Centro Penitenciario Madrid VI in Aranjuez. She was sent to an all-male prison as she hadn't changed her name to Cristina nor her gender in her identity papers. She claimed that her parents didn't even know that she had entered prison until she called them after being sent to the Gregorio Marañón Hospital due to health issues in 2004.

In 2014, she reportedly served eight additional months in prison after being mistaken by police for another suspect. Her second term was served in a female prison.

== Media coverage ==
Upon leaving prison in 2006, she moved to Valencia with friend Paca la Piraña. The same year, Cristina told the media that she had been raped and abused by the prison guards. This allegation was disputed by the Spanish prison authorities. She openly spoke about her weight gain in prison as she reached 120 kg during her time in prison, and she was invited on several television programmes, marking an apparent recovery of her career. In October 2010, the sensationalist Spanish TV show ¿Dónde estás corazón? challenged La Veneno to lose all the weight she had gained. By March 2011, La Veneno had lost 35 kg. It was revealed that she had been suffering from bulimia, severe depression, and deep anxiety.

On 10 May 2013, La Veneno appeared on Sálvame Deluxe on Telecinco to tease her upcoming memoir Ni puta, ni santa (Las memorias de La Veneno) ('Neither a whore nor a saint: the memories of La Veneno'), which was delayed until 2016. In August, she revealed that her ex-boyfriend had fled with all her savings, over €60,000, and she was living on just €300 per month in benefits.

On 3 October 2016, she released a memoir titled ¡Digo! Ni puta ni santa. Las memorias de La Veneno co-written by journalist Valeria Vegas. Shortly after its release, fans of La Veneno gathered at the Safari Disco Club in Barcelona for a presentation of the book. The memoir was also quick to sell out after its release.

== Death ==
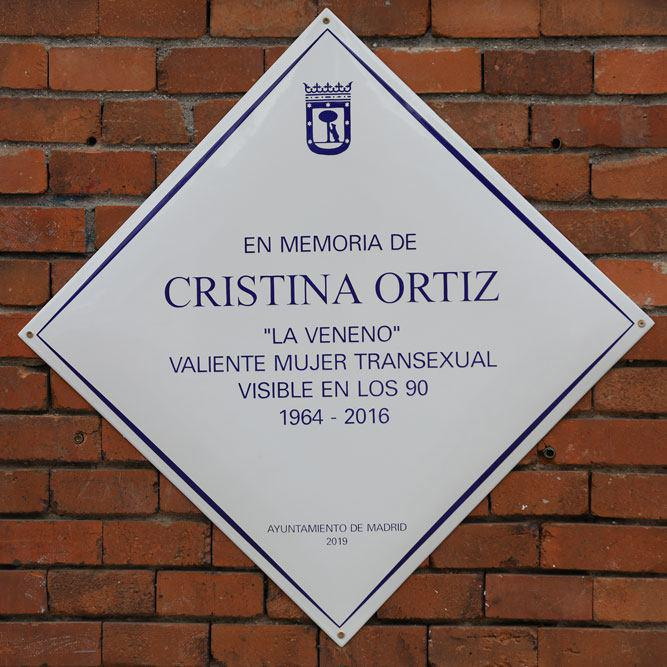
«Cristina Ortiz "La Veneno" valiente mujer transexual visible en los 90» (Spanish for «Cristina Ortiz "La Veneno", brave trans woman visible through the 90s») Commemorative plaque to La Veneno in Madrid.

On 5 November 2016, Cristina was found semi-conscious in her house, covered with bruises on her head, legs, and feet, and with a deep wound to the head, which caused a traumatic brain injury. She was found there by her boyfriend, and there were bloodstains in her bathroom. According to her relatives, La Veneno’s injuries resulted from taking a fall in her bathtub. She was taken by ambulance to the Hospital Universitario La Paz, where she was placed in an induced coma as a preventative measure. Additionally, she was suffering from severe cerebral edema, which causes swelling of the brain, and had to be sent into emergency surgery to operate on her skull and prevent further brain damage. She remained in intensive care. Cristina died four days later on 9 November 2016 after suffering from multiple organ failure. She apparently had taken a very large dose of Xanax tablets and alcohol. A second post mortem reached the same verdict but the coroner reported that Cristina had fallen down the stairs rather than in her bathtub.

While she was hospitalized in the intensive care unit, people close to La Veneno speculated that the incident was not accidental, because she received death threats after the publication of her autobiography, which talked about affairs she had with powerful people. Her ashes were scattered half in the Parque del Oeste, and half in her hometown of Adra.

In April 2019, a plaque was unveiled to honour her in the Parque del Oeste. A week later, the plaque was stolen. Fans turned the site of the stolen plaque into a shrine made up of letters and photos to honor La Veneno's legacy. In October 2020, the City Council of Madrid announced that the plaque would be replaced after many popular petitions were submitted, and they did so on December 4 of that same year. The plaque can be found between Francisco y Jacinto Alcántara Street and Paseo de Camoens by the fountain of architect Juan de Villanueva.

== In popular culture ==
The 2020 TV series Veneno is based on the 2016 book ¡Digo! Ni puta ni santa: Las memorias de La Veneno (I Say! Not a Whore, Not a Saint: The Memories of La Veneno), and tells the story of La Veneno's life. Jedet, Daniela Santiago and Isabel Torres played La Veneno at different ages. The airing of the show received positive feedback in Spain, and is considered to be influential in provoking conversation and reflection about the realities and experiences of trans individuals.

The Spanish government shared positive feedback about the series after its airing. Spain's Ministry of Equality made a statement about the importance of remembering La Veneno and sharing her story so others do not experience the same events, according to the director of Sexual Diversity and LGBTI Rights, Boti G. Rodrigo. The vice president, Pablo Iglesias, also shared his appreciation for the show on twitter after watching the first season.

The series is available to be streamed on Atresplayer, which saw almost a 50% increase in subscribers after fans flocked to the platform to watch the story of La Veneno.

In June 2021, she was the theme of a tribute runway in a first season episode of Drag Race España. Later the same year, she was impersonated by Icesis Couture in the "Snatch Game" episode of the second season of Canada's Drag Race.
