= Veneno (TV series) =

2020 Spanish biographical television miniseries

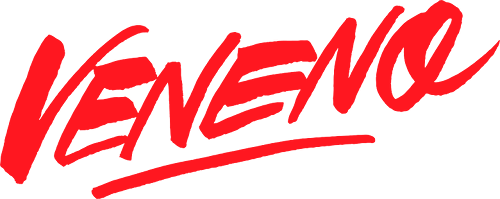
- Also known as: Veneno: Vida y muerte de un icono
- Genre: Biographical; Drama; Coming-of-age
- Created by: Javier Ambrossi; Javier Calvo
- Based on: ¡Digo! Ni puta ni santa. Las memorias de La Veneno by Valeria Vegas
- Directed by: Javier Ambrossi; Javier Calvo; Mikel Rueda; Álex Rodrigo
- Starring: Jedet; Daniela Santiago; Isabel Torres; Lola Rodríguez; Paca La Piraña
- Country of origin: Spain
- Original language: Spanish
- No. of episodes: 8

Production
- Cinematography: Gris Jordana
- Running time: 44–65 minutes
- Production companies: Atresmedia; Suma Latina

Original release
- Network: Atresplayer Premium
- Release: 29 March – 25 October 2020

Related
- Vestidas de azul

Veneno (previously Veneno: Vida y Muerte de un Icono) is a Spanish biographical television limited series, created by Javier Ambrossi and Javier Calvo that aired on Atresplayer Premium in Spain from 29 March to 25 October 2020. The series, which tells the life and death of Spanish transgender singer and television personality Cristina Ortiz Rodríguez, better known by the nickname "La Veneno", is based on the biography ¡Digo! Ni puta ni santa. Las memorias de La Veneno by Valeria Vegas.

The full season was scheduled to be released on 29 March 2020 on subscription streaming platform Atresplayer Premium but, due to the COVID-19 pandemic, production and post-production could not be completed. Thus, only the first of eight episodes aired on that date. The second episode aired on 28 June 2020. The third episode aired on 20 September 2020, and the rest of the episodes were released on a weekly basis. The series' soundtrack including cover versions by Amaia, Álex de Lucas and Jedet as well as the original song "Nunca Debiste Cruzar el Mississippi" by Leiva, was released on digital platforms on 29 October.

Veneno premiered internationally on HBO Max starting 19 November 2020.

A sequel series, Vestidas de azul, premiered in December 2023.

== Background ==
In May 2019 it was announced that Javier Calvo and Javier Ambrossi were in talks to produce, write and direct a biopic about the life of Spanish transgender TV personality "La Veneno" for Atresmedia. In November 2019 the cast was confirmed, with Jedet, Daniela Santiago and Isabel Torres being selected to play the main character, Cristina Ortiz, in the series. The selection was very well received by the general public who thanked the duo for choosing three genuine transgender women to play a transgender woman. Filming began on 16 December in Isleta del Moro, a small town in the province of Almería. Production later extended to Adra, Valencia and the Community of Madrid (with special focus at the Casa de Campo) and was scheduled to last four months, ending in March 2020. Production was shut in early March due to Spain's national lockdown, decreed on 14 March and caused by the 2019-20 coronavirus pandemic, which had already infected over 5,000 people by that date.

On 17 and 25 January, the first two teasers were posted on social media. On 28 January it was announced that the series would be released on Atresmedia Premium in March 2020. The official release date was revealed on 14 February. The series' poster was revealed on 6 March with the final trailer being released a week later.

== Synopsis ==
Veneno focuses on the life and death of one of the most important and beloved LGBT icons in Spain, known as La Veneno (Cristina Ortiz). Despite being known for her charisma, and a fun personality, La Veneno's life and death remains an enigma. This story tells the experiences of a struggling transgender woman, who achieved fame with television appearances in the 90s and conquered the audience with a unique vision of the world. Throughout her life, the LGBT story in Spain is narrated from the 1960s to the present day.

The series follows the story of Valeria Vegas, a journalism student who never understood why people called her by a name that was not her own, the same thing that happened to Cristina, by then misnamed "Joselito" and the same one she had they have to survive a cruel and violent childhood under the Spain of the 60s. Two women who were born in very different times but who end up united forever when Valeria decides to write a book about the life of the iconic Cristina, La Veneno. The series also talks about the importance and relevance of mass media, how it can popularize or marginalize in just one second.

== Context ==
The last decade of the second millennium was an amazing and turbulent one for Spain. The 1992 Summer Olympic Games were held in Barcelona transforming the city entirely and showing the world the new open and democratic Spain after the Francoist Dictatorship, the 1992 Universal Exposition was held in Seville as Spain started an internationalization process to let the world get to know the country. Tourism flourished and so did the economy. What visitors did not know was that the country was in a process of moral reconstruction after a 35-year totalitarian dictatorship, and many were still fanatics of that kind of politics. The mentality of the dictatorship included press and personal censorship, repression and persecution of minorities or left-wing people. After this dark period the social movement popularly known as "Movida Madrileña" started. This movement consisted of making use of the freedom Spaniards had been deprived of. Musicians, journalists and ordinary people could now express themselves completely without being afraid of being taken to prison or being assassinated. Thus, Madrid became this paradise of liberty within Spain, filled with parties, wild life and cultural activities from all kinds of ideologies. The democratic transition started in the 1980s even though the essence and soul of Franco was still present after his death. The first five years of the 1990s in Spain were a dark, life-changing period for the country due to the huge amount of corruption scandals, terrorist attacks and the murder of three 14-year-old girls in the province of Valencia. The girls (according to the official report) were kidnapped in November 1992 by two young men after they both agreed to take them to a youth club in Picassent. They were taken to a ruined rural house in the middle of the hills in Tous where they were raped, tortured and killed. Throughout the investigation, the discovery of the bodies in January 1993, their respective funerals and judgments, the media was always present since one of the girls' parents went to the press in first instance in order to help with the search for their daughter. When it was revealed that the girls hitchhiked to get to the club (something very normal at that time), women's freedoms were considerably reduced due to the hysteria generated by this event. The essence of freedom in Spain declined and social chronic shows started appearing on national television.

One of the most popular and most important of these was Esta Noche Cruzamos el Mississippi (English: Tonight We Cross the Mississippi), hosted by journalist Pepe Navarro. This TV show mixed humorous sketches and news of social chronicle. It is mostly known because of its humor and in major part due to its exhaustive investigation and reporting of the Alcàsser Girls murder. El Mississippi, aired on Telecinco, became the most-watched late night show in Spain. In April 1996 journalist Faela Sainz, had to make a report for Navarro's show. After being scammed in her first attempt to report from Chueca, Sainz drove to the Parque del Oeste to film how prostitution took place in Madrid, to show the world something that was still not talked about in the press. Separated in two "districts", the park was filled with transgender and cisgender prostitutes. The journalist, alongside a camera and audio man, interviewed some of them. At one point she interviews Cristina Ortiz Rodríguez who adopted the alias of "La Veneno" due to the 1976 Los Chunguitos track "Dame Veneno". The interview with La Veneno aired on live television on 15 April. The audience constantly wrote into the show asking when she was going to make an appearance. After two weeks of insisting, Ortiz made an appearance on the show on 29 April 1996 and became a regular castmember. Her undeniable beauty, unbelievably raw stories, coarse language, light and sense of humor captivated the public, making Navarro's show reach 8 million viewers every time she made an appearance. La Veneno became one of the first transgender people to show Spain the raw but true reality of prostitution, poverty and disrespect for minorities even from their own family members. Since that moment, she became an instant LGBT icon in Spain and a voice for all transgender people who have been repressed for their personal identity. When Esta Noche Cruzamos el Mississippi ended in 1997, La Veneno did two R-rated movies, released an EP and continued appearing in other television shows like La Sonrisa del Pelícano or Sálvame. In 2003 she was sent to prison due to fraud. After being released from prison in 2006, a transgender student Valeria Vegas from the University of Valencia met La Veneno and became close with her. In October 2016 La Veneno's memories "¡Digo! Ni Puta ni Santa. Las Memorias de la Veneno" (English: "I say! Neither a Whore nor a Saint. The Memories of La Veneno"), written by Vegas, were released.

== Cast ==
In order of appearance.

=== Main ===
- Jedet as La Veneno (young age)
- Daniela Santiago as La Veneno
- Isabel Torres as La Veneno (older age)
- Lola Rodríguez as Valeria Vegas
- Paca "La Piraña" as herself
- Desirée Rodríguez as Paca "La Piraña" (young age)

=== Recurring ===
- Mariona Terés as Amparo
- Israel Elejalde as Pepe Navarro
- Maite Sandoval as Mari
- Lola Dueñas as Faela Sainz
- Ester Expósito as Machús Osinaga
- Goya Toledo as Valeria Vegas' mother
- Elvira Mínguez as Valeria Vegas' teacher
- Sophia Lamar as Cristina Onassis
- Andrea García as La Zane
- Lara Martorell as La Fani
- Ángeles Ortega as La Manola
- Karen Hernández as Carolina la de Vigo
- Candela Santiago as Tamara la Gitana
- Juani Ruiz as herself
- Alex Saint as Sacha
- Desireé Vogue as Bienvenida "La Bienve"
- Laura Frenchkiss as Rocío
- Marcos Sotkovszki as José Antonio "Joselito" Ortiz Rodríguez (teenager)
- Guille Márquez as José Antonio "Joselito" Ortiz Rodríguez (child)
- Mercedes León as María Jesús Rodríguez (La Veneno's mother)
- Santino Cassá as Manolito (young age)
- Inma Pérez-Quirós as Gracia "La Sevillana"
- Omar Banana as Manolito (teenager)
- Ciro Petrone as Angelo (fictional version of Andrea Petruzzelli)
- Tamar Novas as Miguel
- Carlos Manglano as Mihai
- Andreu Castro as Carlos "La Cebollina"

=== Single appearances ===
- Pablo Amores as Rubén
- La Zowi as Sonia Monroy
- Esty Quesada as Take That fan
- Jordi Vilches as Pablo
- Micky Molina as Juan Ignacio Blanco
- Han Wang as the Chinese restaurant waiter
- Eric Masip as Tomás
- Elena Martín as Charo
- Gonzalo Ferreño as Andoni Ferreño
- Sergio Alis as television collaborator
- Laura Fa as television collaborator
- Ángel Garó as television presenter
- Mona Martínez as Mari Carmen Ortiz
- Sonia Martínez as television producer
- Lala Chús as Lydia Lozano
- Ángela Ponce as Loli Ruiz (Juani Ruiz young age)
- Ana Milán as Sara Montiel
- Jorge Usón as Manolito
- Nacho Vigalondo as Juan Antonio Canta
- María Teresa Campos as herself
- Pepe Navarro as security man
- Brays Efe as Florentino Fernández / Crispín Klander
- Iván Labanda as TV host
- Gracia Olayo as air hostess
- Miriam Giovanelli as Cicciolina
- Carla Antonelli as Tita Fajardo
- Sofía Ambrossi as nurse
- Pepa Rus as Valeria's sister-in-law
- Mariana Cordero as Valeria's mother-in-law
- Juan Muñoz as Paco Cere
- Juan Codina as Anthony Frames
- Topacio Fresh as Paco's wife
- Valeria Vegas as Lola
- Kaydy Cain as Juan "Juanillo"
- Vicente Vergara as Luis
- Ramón Ibarra as Jacinto
- Anna Allen as Carmen Albacete
- Yolanda Sola as Yolanda
- Pepón Nieto as La Veneno's brother
- Chos as Mari Tere Ortiz (adult)
- Olalla Hernández as La Veneno's sister
- Rafa Castillo as La Veneno's brother
- Carolina Sobe as television collaborator
- Nando Escribano as television collaborator
- Laura Corbacho as television collaborator
- Samantha Hudson as librarian
- Carmen Borrego as television collaborator
- José Coronado as taxi driver
- Machús Osinaga as herself
- Faela Sáinz as herself
- Anita as herself
- Fran Ortiz as himself
- Óscar Ladoire as Don José

== Episodes ==
No.	Title	Directed by	Written by	Original release date
1	"La noche que cruzamos el Mississippi" "The Night We Crossed the Mississippi"	Javier Ambrossi and Javier Calvo	Javier Ambrossi and Javier Calvo	29 March 2020
In 2006, in Valencia, Valeria Vegas sets out to meet her idol La Veneno who works as a prostitute on the Parque del Oeste of Madrid.
2	"Un viaje en el tiempo" "A Travel in the Time"	Javier Ambrossi and Javier Calvo	Javier Ambrossi and Javier Calvo	28 June 2020
3	"Acaríciame" "Caress Me"	Mikel Rueda	Claudia Costafreda, Elena Martín and Ian de la Rosa	20 September 2020
4	"La maldición de las Onassis" "The Curse of the Onassis"	Álex Rodrigo	Javier Ambrossi and Javier Calvo	27 September 2020
5	"Cristina a través del espejo" "Cristina Through the Looking Glass"	Javier Ambrossi and Javier Calvo	Javier Ambrossi and Javier Calvo	4 October 2020
6	"Una de las nuestras" "One of Ours"	Javier Ambrossi and Javier Calvo	Félix Sabroso	11 October 2020
7	"Fue más o menos así" "It Was More or Less Like This"	Mikel Rueda	Claudia Costafreda, Elena Martín and Ian de la Rosa	18 October 2020
8	"Los tres entierros de Cristina Ortiz" "The Three Funerals of Cristina Ortiz"	Álex Rodrigo	Javier Ambrossi and Javier Calvo	25 October 2020

== Release and reception ==
Since the release of the series' first episode on 29 March 2020, the number of subscribers to Atresplayer Premium grew 42%, reaching 3.3 million subscribers. Veneno had the best debut of a series in the platform's history and became the most-watched programme on Atresplayer Premium being 10 times more watched than any other show on it to date. The series' second episode aired on 28 June, to celebrate the cancelled Pride Day. On 12 August, Atresmedia announced that the third episode would be available on their platform on 20 September. Starting then, a new episode was launched every Sunday, marking the series' end on 25 October 2020. The first three episodes were screened at more than 200 Spanish cinemas on 17 September. To mark the launch of the last episode on the streaming platform, the first two episodes aired on free-to-air channel Antena 3 on 25 October 2020. They were the most-watched show of the day in Spain, with over 2.5 million viewers for the first episode.

In July 2020, HBO Max acquired the streaming rights to the series for the United States and Latin America. The series premiered on HBO Max on 19 November 2020.

=== Critical reception ===
Veneno received acclaim from critics upon release. Several critics named the series "a must see", "a moving and complex story within a brilliant fiction that is emotional and necessary", "an interesting and risky proposal about the Spanish icon" as well as "a work of art".

IndieWire ranked the series ninth on its list of best LGBTQ TV shows of the 21st century.

== Impact ==
In June 2020 it was announced that the series' main cast was selected as the barker for the 2020 Gay Pride in Madrid. However, Veneno reached its popularity peak in October 2020, as the series was coming to an end. On 10 October 2020, the City Council of Madrid announced that a new commemorative plaque of La Veneno would be placed at the Parque del Oeste due to popular demand after the first one was vandalized and stolen a week after its placement in April 2019 during the presidency of Manuela Carmena. On 15 October a huge promotional canvas was placed in the centre of Gran Vía, Madrid's most transited and most important avenue. This marks the first time an LGBT series is promoted in this avenue in particular. On 18 October, Spanish vice president Pablo Iglesias stated on Twitter that the series "makes you cry, laugh, remember, empathize, but above all, it makes you understand the savage pain that trans people have been and are inflicted on, simply by being themselves. I hope a lot of young people see the series". This caused a lot of people to react negatively against the Government of Spain, who promised a national "Trans Law" back in 2015. On 30 October, Minister of Equality Irene Montero announced that the law would be voted by the Spanish people before being submitted for approval by the government in the following months. This would allow transgender people to change their name and gender in the official documentation without presenting medical evidence of transition nor taking hormones. Spain's law stated before this that you had to present medical evidence to do so as well as taking hormones for 2 months without interruption. Montero had previously recommended Veneno on RNE "to understand the stigma that trans people suffer". Veneno also became the only Spanish series to be included in the prestigious FreshTV Fiction list as one of the most innovative productions of MIPCOM 2020. It was also nominated for a Premio Iris for Best Direction and its main characters won the Premio Ondas for Best Female Performance in a Fiction.

== Feature film version ==
In the summer of 2022 a 110 minute cut of the series had a limited release in movie theaters.

== Awards and nominations ==
Year	Award	Category	Nominee(s)	Result	Ref.
2020	Iris Awards	Best Direction	Javier Calvo & Javier Ambrossi	Nominated	
2020	Iris Awards	Critics' Award	Veneno	Won	
2020	Premio Ondas	Best Female Performance in a Fiction	Daniela Santiago	Won	
2020	Premio Ondas	Best Female Performance in a Fiction	Isabel Torres	Won	
2020	Premio Ondas	Best Female Performance in a Fiction	Jedet	Won	
2020	MIPCOM Diversity TV Excellence Awards	Diversity TV Excellence Award	Veneno	Nominated	
2020	FanCineGay Awards	FanCineGay Award	Veneno	Won	
2020	FICAL Awards	Filming Almería Award	Veneno	Won	
2020	HOY Magazine Awards	Best Series of the Year	Veneno	Won	
2020	HOY Magazine Awards	Best Actress of the Year	Daniela Santiago	Won	
2020	HOY Magazine Awards	Best Actress of the Year	Isabel Torres	Won	
2020	HOY Magazine Awards	Promise of the Year	Jedet	Nominated	
2021	26th Forqué Awards	Best Series	Veneno	Nominated	
2021	26th Forqué Awards	Best Actress in a TV Series	Daniela Santiago	Nominated	
2021	Feroz Awards	Best Drama Series	Veneno	Nominated	
2021	Feroz Awards	Best Main Actress in a Series	Daniela Santiago	Nominated	
2021	Feroz Awards	Best Supporting Actress in a Series	Paca la Piraña	Nominated	
2021	MiM Series Awards	Best Direction	Javier Calvo & Javier Ambrossi	Nominated	
2021	MiM Series Awards	Best Drama Series	Veneno	Nominated	
2021	GLAAD Media Awards	Outstanding Spanish-Language Scripted Television Series	Veneno	Won	
2021	Diversa Awards	Diversa TV	Veneno	Won	
2021	23rd Iris Awards	Best Fiction	Veneno	Pending	
2022	Actors and Actresses Union Awards	Best Actress in a Minor Role	Ester Expósito	Nominated	
