= Valeria Vegas =

Spanish journalist, essayist, writer, documentary filmmaker and producer

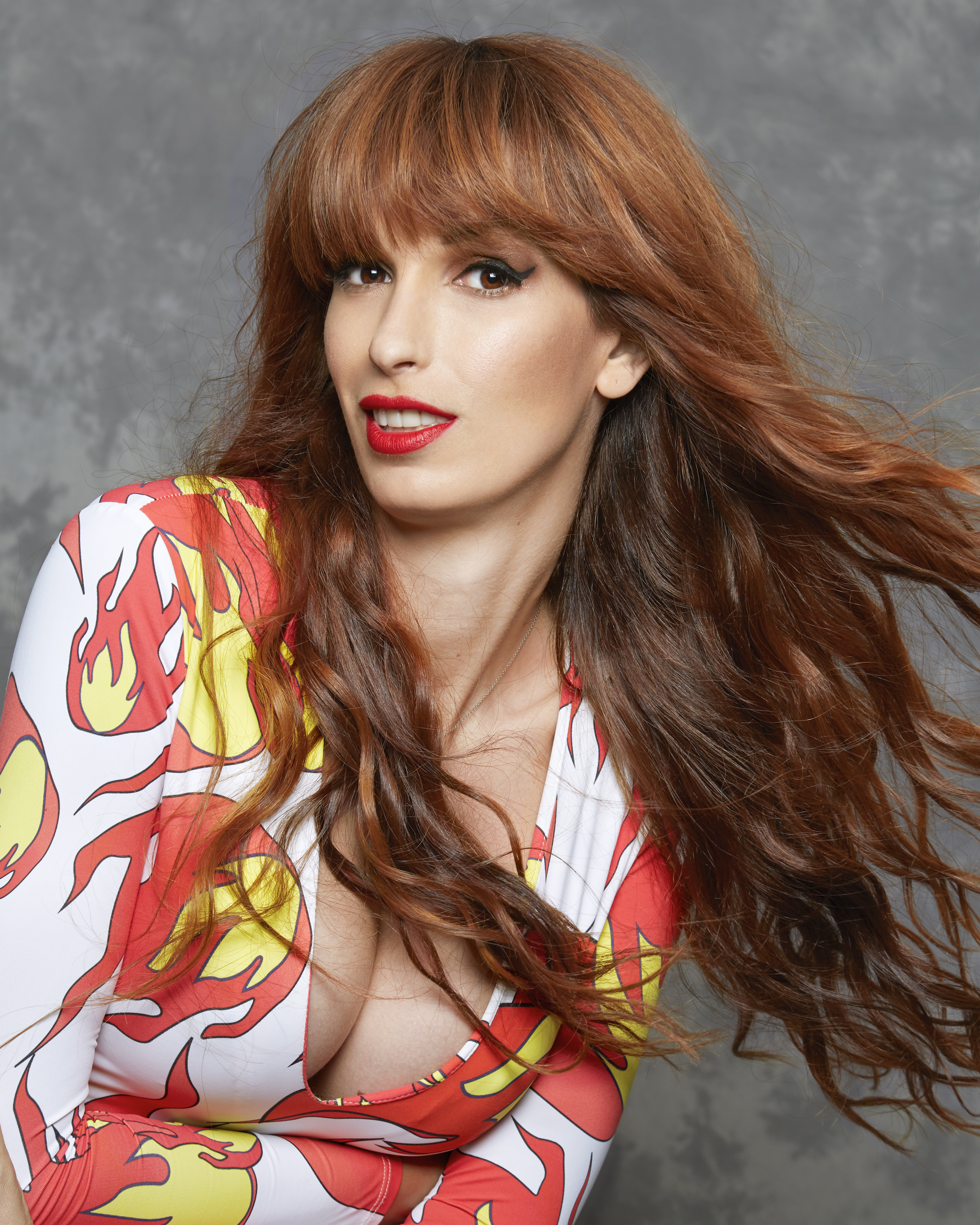
- Valeria Vegas in 2018
- Born: Valeria Martínez Zaragoza; 8 August 1985 (age 41); Valencia, Spain
- Occupation: Writer
- Writing career
- Genre: Essay
- Notable work: ¡Digo! Ni puta ni santa. Las memorias de La Veneno (2015)

Valeria Martínez Zaragoza (born 8 August 1985), known by her pseudonym Valeria Vegas, is a Spanish transgender journalist, essayist, writer, documentary filmmaker and producer.

== Literary career ==
She studied journalism in Valencia, and graduated with a degree in Audiovisual Communication. In 2015, she moved to Madrid.

Her first novel, Grandes actrices del cine español, was published in 2015, as was her biography of La Veneno, entitled ¡Digo! Ni puta ni santa. Las memorias de La Veneno, which served as the basis for the Atresmedia Veneno series that was later shown on HBO in the United States.

In 2015, she began to work as a journalist for media outlets such as Vanity Fair Spain, Shangay, Lecturas y Jot Down, Candy, Paraíso, Chicas & maricas and Cannabis Magazine, among others. And, in 2019, she published Vestidas de azul. Análisis social y cinematográfico de la mujer transexual en los años de la Transición española.

She has participated as a panelist for several events, including: El Congreso del Bienestar on Cadena SER in 2017, in which the central theme was "Love with capital letters"; the panel discussion for the exhibition Cultura Basura, which was shown on La Térmica's channel and took place in Málaga (2017) and was entitled "Trash Culture: intention or ingenuity", in addition to participating in this exhibition with some vinyl records; the round table Encuentros con la serie B, which was part of Rizoma Festival in Madrid (2017). She was also participated in the collective exhibition Fotonovela at La Fresh Gallery.

She was present at the La Convención Política y Social por una Sociedad más Justa e Igualitaria, in La Palma in 2019, part of the Isla Bonita Love Festival, where she screened her documentary Manolita, la chen de Arcos about Manuela Saborido Muñoz. She had directed the film in 2016, and it won the Best Spanish Documentary award at "LesGaiCineMad 2016." In 2018, she participated in the II Festival Cultura con Orgullo in Sevilla (Spain), in which she screened her documentary Manolita, la chen de Arcos. She has also been a constributor for La Otra Crónica (LOC) a news site hosted by El Mundo since 2018.

== Literary works ==
- 2015 – Grandes actrices del cine español. Editorial Ocho y Medio.
- 2016 – ¡Digo! Ni puta ni santa. Las memorias de La Veneno. ISBN 9788460883562. Self publication.
- 2019 – Vestidas de azul. Análisis social y cinematográfico de la mujer transexual en los años de la Transición española. Dos Bigotes Editorial. ISBN 9788494967412
- 2020 – Libérate. Dos Bigotes Editorial. ISBN 9788412142884

== Audiovisual projects ==
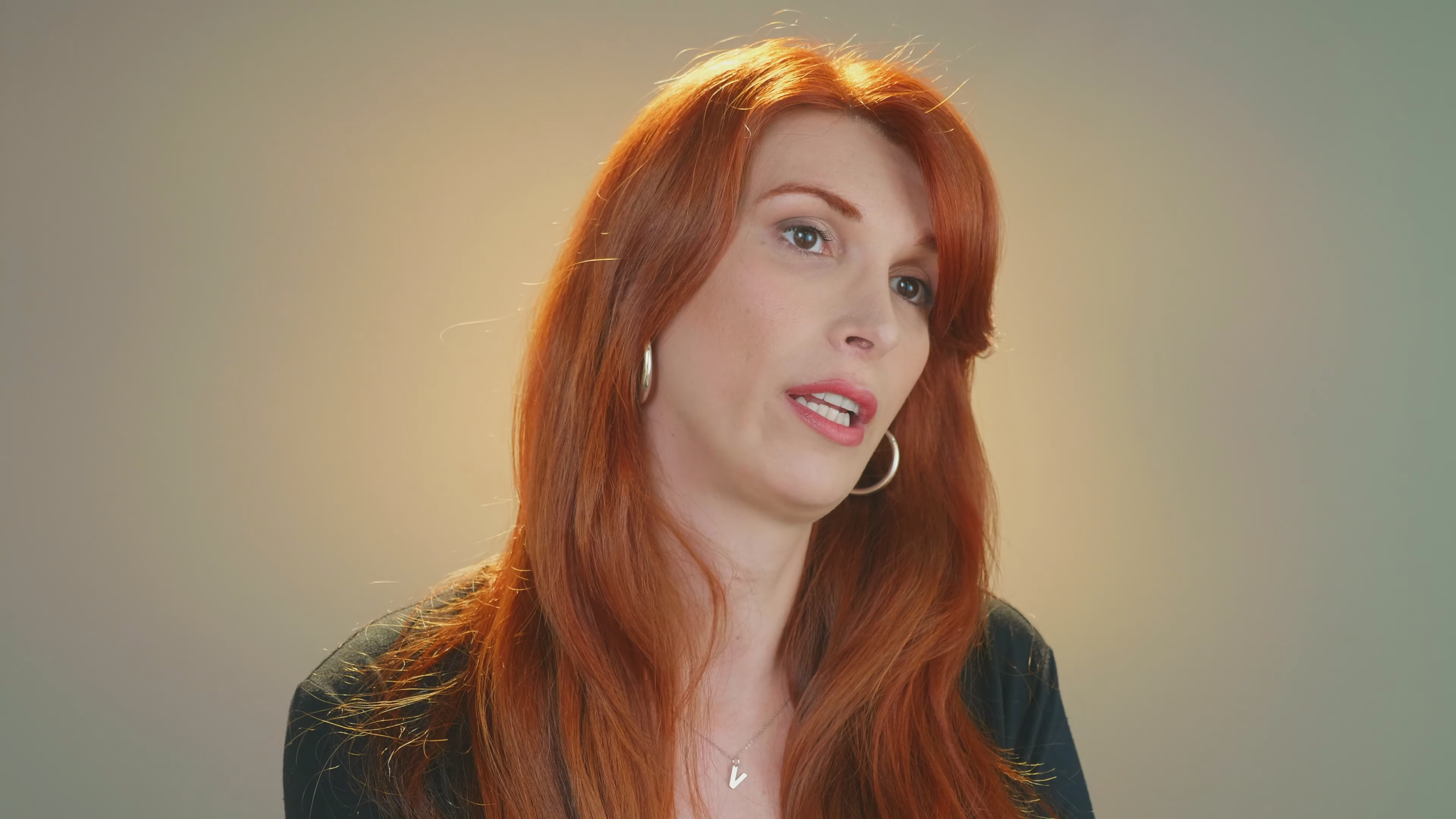
Valeria Vegas in 2020 for the campaign #ProtégeteDelOdio

In March 2019, she began as a contributor for the program Un año de tu vida on Canal Sur, presented by Toñi Moreno, in which famous people are interviewed, with particular interest in the private details of their lives. As of 2016, she also was a contributor for El legado de ... (also on Canal Sur) in which she spoke about Rocío Dúrcal, Marifé de Triana and Manolo Escobar, among others. She was also a contributor to en El Tea Party de Alaska y Mario, within the B-movie theme, for Google+. She worked as a documentarian for the project 40 años de El País en el cine, directed by David Trueba. She is currently a contributor for Yasss, a Mtmad program produced by Mediaset, and also on Tinder for WorldPride in 2017. From September 2019 to June 2019, she was part of the radio team for Aquí estamos from Canal Sur Radio, participating in the Los Fantásticos From September 2019 to the current date, she directs the radio program El Reservado de Valeria, which is part of the radio program La noche de Cremades also on Canal Sur Radio and coordinated by Rafael Cremades. In January 2020, she joined the weekend program A Vivir Madrid from Cadena SER and led by Macarena Berlin.

In December 2019, Atresmedia began filming the biographical series entitled Veneno based on Vegas' book, created by Javier Calvo and Javier Ambrossi, and performed by Jedet, Daniela Santiago and Isabel Torres in three different stages of Cristina Ortiz's life. Vegas formed part of the production team, and in the series, Vegas is played by the Canarian model and actress Lola Rodríguez.

Vega was part of the jury for the LGBT-themed film festival Zinegoak in Bilbao, Spain, in 2020.

== Television career ==
- El legado de... (2016) on Canal Sur, contributor
- Sábado Deluxe (2016) on Telecinco, guest
- La noche de Rafa Cremades (2019) on Canal Sur Radio, contributor
- Un año de tu vida (2019–2020) on Canal Sur, contributor
- Veneno (2020) on Atresplayer Premium, scriptwriter and minor role
- A Vivir Madrid (2020) on Cadena SER, contributor
- Hormigas blancas (2020) on Telecinco, contributor
- À Punt Directe (2020) on À Punt, guest
- Ellas (2020) on Atresplayer Premium, contributor
- La hora de La 1 (2020–presente) on La 1, contributor
- Los Felices Veinte (2021) on Canal Orange, guest
- Rocío, contar la verdad para seguir viva (2021) on Telecinco, contributor

== Controversy ==
After the publication of her book ¡Digo! Ni puta ni santa. Las memorias de La Veneno, she was reported to authorities by Cristina Ortiz’ family, who accused her of falsifying a commercial document and simulating a contract. She had to undergo a graphology analysis to prove that she was innocent.
