= Atresplayer =

Spanish video-on-demand service

- Company type: Division
- Website type: OTT platform
- Headquarters: San Sebastián de los Reyes, Spain
- Industry: Entertainment; mass media
- Products: Streaming media; video on demand
- Parent: Atresmedia
- Commercial: Yes
- Registration: Required
- Users: 670,000 (December 2024)
- Launched: 9 September 2019; 7 years ago
- Current status: Active

Atresplayer (formerly Atresplayer Premium) is a Spanish paid video-on-demand over-the-top streaming service of Atresmedia. It is marketed outside Spain as Atresplayer Internacional.

== History and description ==
The paid suscription was launched in Spain on 8 September 2019. The first original series released on the platform was El Nudo. Besides the regular services offered by the ad-supported Atresplayer (catch-up service and some series), Atresplayer Premium early offered three main types of programming: Premium Exclusivo (full releases before free-to-air broadcasting), Premium Preestreno (series releasing a week before free-to-air broadcasting), and exclusive programming.

In December 2021, Atresplayer had over 600,000 subscribers.

Unlike its rival paid suscription, Mitele Plus (initially betting on football/sport as a main business line while leasing exclusive content rights in Spain to Amazon Prime Video), Atresplayer Premium restricted its offer to streaming original programming. It was available outside Spain in Latin America, the United States, Canada, and Mexico under the "Paquete Premium Internacional" subscription mode. There is, however, geo-blocked content.

Since Atresplayer Premium's launch, much of the Atresmedia original programming has been first released on the platform, including series such as La valla, Veneno, #Luimelia, Toy Boy, or Perdida.

Atresmedia set a 5 July 2023 date for the renaming of 'Atresplayer Premium' into 'Atresplayer', merging AVOD and PVOD products under the same brandname.

In December 2024, TelevisaUnivision and Atresmedia announced an agreement for the launch of Vix in Spain through Atresplayer starting in January 2025.
