= La llamada (musical) =

- Music: Alberto Jiménez
- Lyrics: Alberto Jiménez
- Book: Javier Ambrossi; Javier Calvo
- Premiere: May 2, 2013: Teatro Lara, Madrid

La llamada is a Spanish musical written and directed by Javier Ambrossi and Javier Calvo. It is a comedy, with themes of friendship, love, and the challenges of adolescence. The song selection includes original pieces composed by Alberto Jiménez (a singer for Miss Caffeina), alongside songs by Whitney Houston, Presuntos Implicados, Henry Méndez, and religious songs, among others. It is accompanied by a small band of four musicians.

A film adaptation was released in 2017.

== Productions ==
The musical premiered in the lobby of Madrid's Teatro Lara on 2 May, 2013, playing eight sold-out shows. After its early success, the show performed on the main stage of the theatre starting on 18 October, 2013.

It began its Spanish tour in 2014. Cities visited included Palencia, Valladolid, Valencia o Soria. In total, more than 30 Spanish cities hosted the show. On April 15, 2015, the show celebrated its second anniversary with a special performance.

In 2015, INK Teatro and Claudio Sodi bought the rights to bring the musical to Mexico, where it premiered on 28 August at the Teatro López Tarso. However, the Mexican adaptation had a poor reception and closed after a few weeks.

There have also been plans for productions in Argentina, Peru, Uruguay, and Chile. The show was also performed in Moscow.

== Plot ==
In August 2013, in Segovia, Spain, María and Susana are two seventeen-year olds who are passionate about reggaeton and electro latino; together, they form a band named Suma Latina. Both girls are attending La Brújula, a Christian summer camp they have attended since childhood. The camp is run by two nuns: Bernarda, a modern good-hearted woman who tries to promote faith through music, and Milagros, a young, innocent, and doubtful novice who admires Presuntos Implicados. During the night, María has apparitions of God, who sings Whitney Houston songs to her. The apparition begins to change the lives of the two girls, as they question their lives and their plans for the future.

== Cast ==
=== María Casado ===
Year	2013	2014	2015	2016	2017	2018	2019	2020	2021	2022	2023
Macarena García											
Claudia Traisac											
Clara Alvarado											
Susana Abaitua											
Nuria Herrero											
Anna Castillo											
Nerea Rodríguez											
Andrea Guasch											
Angy Fernández											
Lydia Fairén											
Cast member Special collaboration / Specific replacement Current cast member

=== Susana Romero ===
Año	2013	2014	2015	2016	2017	2018	2019	2020	2021	2022	2023
Andrea Ros											
Anna Castillo											
Angy Fernández											
Lucía Gil											
Susana Abaitua											
Nuria Herrero											
Marta Sango											
Cast member Special collaboration / Specific replacement Current cast member

=== Milagros ===
Year	2013	2014	2015	2016	2017	2018	2019	2020	2021	2022	2023
Belén Cuesta											
Olalla Hernández											
Érika Bleda											
Roko											
Javier Calvo											
Estrella Xtravaganza											
Cast member Special collaboration / Specific replacement Current cast member

=== Bernarda de los Arcos ===
Year	2013	2014	2015	2016	2017	2018	2019	2020	2021	2022	2023
Llum Barrera											
Gracia Olayo											
Soledad Mallol											
Brays Efe											
Alicia Orozco											
Mar Abascal											
Neus Sanz											
Yolanda Ramos											
Marta Valverde											
Loreto Valverde											
Cast member Special collaboration / Specific replacement Current cast member

=== Dios ===
Año	2013	2014	2015	2016	2017	2018	2019	2020	2021	2022	2023
Richard Collins-Moore											
David Comrie											
Raoul Vázquez											
Paco Arrojo											
Ruth Lorenzo											
Famous Oberogo											
Gerónimo Rauch											
Supremme de Luxe											
Cast member Special collaboration / Specific replacement Current cast member

=== Mexican cast ===
Characters	María Casado	Susana Romero	Bernarda de los Arcos	Milagros	Dios
Original cast	Natasha Dupeyrón	Tessa Ia	Laura Zapata	Alexis de Anda	Federico DiLorenzo
Tour		Ximena Romo			Manuel Gorka

== Musical numbers ==
- "I will always love you"
- "Si esto es fe"
- "Viviremos firmes en la fe"
- "Estoy alegre:
- "I have nothing"
- "Todas las flores" (Spain) / "Eres mi religión" (Mexico) / "A veces me parece" (Chile) / "Extraño ser" (Argentina)
- "Lo hacemos y ya vemos"
- "Step by step"

The song "Todas las flores", from the band Presuntos Implicados, is replaced in the Mexican production with the song "Eres mi religión" from the band Maná. In the Chilean production it is replaced with "A veces me parece" from the Chilean trio Ariztía. In the Argentinian production the song performed is "Extraño ser", from the rock band Suéter.

== Recordings ==
In 2014, a short recording was released with four songs sung by the Spanish cast. In 2019, a recording on the current Spanish cast was released.

== Reception ==
La llamada was received positively by theatre critics, who particularly noted the actors' performances and the show's script. Marcos Ordóñez, of El País, said that "the story is simple and captivating", noting the "natural dialogue", and calling particular attention to Macarena García, whose performance he called "sensational". Saúl Fernández, of La Nueva España, wrote that "the two writers created a produgious musical which transforms [Houston's] songs into a collection of mythic verses".

According to a survey by El País, La llamada was the best theatrical production of 2013. Metrópoli magazine included the show among its ten best theatre productions in Madrid.

== Awards ==
Year	Awards	Category	Candidate	Result
2013	Broadway World Spain	Best Original Musical		Nominated
2013	Broadway World Spain	Best Musical Small Format		Won
2013	Broadway World Spain	Best Artistic Director	Javier Ambrossi; Javier Calvo	Won
2013	Broadway World Spain	Best Leading Actress	Macarena García	Won
2013	Broadway World Spain	Best Supporting Actress	Belén Cuesta	Won
2013	Broadway World Spain	Best Supporting Actor	Richard Collins-Moore	Nominated
2013	Broadway World Spain	Best Choreography	Ana del Rey; Noemí Cabrera	Won
2013	Broadway World Spain	Best Set Design	Ana Garay	Won
2013	Broadway World Spain	Best Costumes	Ana López Cobos	Won
2013	Broadway World Spain	Best Lighting Design	Carlos Alzueta	Won
2013	Broadway World Spain	Mejor diseño original del cartel	Pelayo Rocal; Valero Rioja	Won
2013	Fotogramas de Plata	Best Theatre Actress	Macarena García	Won
2014	Broadway World Spain	Best Touring Musical		Nominated
2014	Broadway World Spain	Best Supporting Actress	Gracia Olayo	Won
2014	Premios de la Unión de Actores	Best Supporting Actress in Theatre	Belén Cuesta	Nominated
2014	Premios de la Unión de Actores	Best Supporting Actor in Theatre	Richard Collins-Moore	Nominated
2014	Premios Teatro Musical	Best Musical		Nominated
2014	Premios Teatro Musical	Best Director	Javier Ambrossi; Javier Calvo	Nominated
2014	Premios Teatro Musical	Best Supporting Actress	Belén Cuesta	Won
2014	Premios Teatro Musical	Best New Actress	Macarena García	Nominated
2014	Premios Teatro Musical	Best Choreography	Ana del Rey; Noemí Cabrera	Nominated
2015	Broadway World Spain	Best Leading Actress	Claudia Traisac	Nominated
2015	Broadway World Spain	Best Supporting Actress	Angy Fernández	Won
2015	Premio Libertad TEATRO	Javier Ambrossi and Javier Calvo		Won
2015	Premios de la Unión de Actores	Best Supporting Actress in Theatre	Gracia Olayo	Nominated
2020	Broadway World Spain	Best Leading Actress	Marta Sango	Nominated

== Film adaptation ==
On 4 November, 2015, Javier Ambrossi and Javier Calvo announced the musical would be adapted into a film. The film was produced by Enrique López Lavigne, José Corbacho, and Kike Maíllo, through Apache Films and Sábado Películas. It stars Macarena García, Anna Castillo, Gracia Olayo, Belén Cuesta, and Richard Collins-Moore, all reprising their respective roles; and also includes appearances by Secun de la Rosa, Víctor Elías, and Esty Quesada.
