= 27th Actors and Actresses Union Awards =

2018 Spanish award ceremony

- Date: 12 March 2018
- Site: Circo Price, Madrid, Spain
- Hosted by: Richard Collins-Moore
- Organized by: Actors and Actresses Union

Highlights
- Honorary career award: Esperanza Roy

The 27th Actors and Actresses Union Awards were held on 12 March 2018 at the Circo Price in Madrid. The gala was hosted by Richard Collins-Moore.

The nominations were announced on 13 February 2018. In addition to the competitive awards, Asociación de Mujeres Cineastas y Medios Audiovisuales (CIMA) received the 'Mujeres en Unión' award (the trophy was collected by their chairwoman, Virginia Yagüe), Esperanza Roy the 'A toda una vida' career award and Juan Carlos Corazza the Special Award. Actor Jorge Usón won twice in the film and theatre categories.

== Winners and nominees ==
The winners and nominees are listed as follows:

=== Film ===
Best Male Performance in a Leading Role: Javier Gutiérrez — The Motive; David Verdaguer — Summer 1993; Javier Bardem — Loving Pablo	Best Female Performance in a Leading Role: Nathalie Poza — Can't Say Goodbye; Kiti Mánver — Las heridas del viento; Penélope Cruz — Loving Pablo
Best Male Performance in a Secondary Role: Juan Diego — Can't Say Goodbye; Antonio de la Torre — The Motive; Víctor Clavijo — Llueven vacas	Best Female Performance in a Secondary Role: Adelfa Calvo — The Motive; Belén Cuesta — Holy Camp!; Gracia Olayo — Holy Camp!
Best Male Performance in a Minor Role: Jorge Usón — Uncertain Glory; Juan Diego — Gold; Secun de la Rosa — Holy Camp!	Best Female Performance in a Minor Role: Geraldine Chaplin — Anchor and Hope; Inma Cuevas — Toc Toc; Pilar Castro — It's for Your Own Good

=== Television ===
Best Male Performance in a Leading Role: Nacho Fresneda — El ministerio del tiempo; Álvaro Morte — Money Heist; Asier Etxeandia — Velvet Colección	Best Female Performance in a Leading Role: Malena Alterio — Vergüenza; Alexandra Jiménez — La zona; Aura Garrido — El ministerio del tiempo
Best Male Performance in a Secondary Role: Pedro Alonso — Money Heist; Jaime Blanch — El ministerio del tiempo; Vito Sanz — Vergüenza	Best Female Performance in a Secondary Role: Ana Polvorosa — Cable Girls; Alba Flores — Money Heist; Ana Villa — Centro médico
Best Male Performance in a Minor Role: Víctor Clavijo — El ministerio del tiempo; Jaime Lorente — Money Heist; José Troncoso — Gym Tony	Best Female Performance in a Minor Role: Petra Martínez — La que se avecina; Luisa Gavasa — El ministerio del tiempo; Mamen Camacho — Servir y proteger

=== Theatre ===
Best Male Performance in a Leading Role: Jorge Usón — Arte; Carlos Hipólito — Billy Elliot the Musical; Ginés García Millán — Espía a una mujer que se mata	Best Female Performance in a Leading Role: María Hervás — Iphigenia en Vallecas; Blanca Portillo — El Cartógrafo; Clara Sanchis — Una habitación propia
Best Male Performance in a Secondary Role: Manolo Solo — Smoking Room; Jorge Bosch — Espía a una mujer que se mata; José Luis Patiño — Cat on a Hot Tin Roof	Best Female Performance in a Secondary Role: María Isasi — Oresteia; Alba Flores — The Trojan Women; Marta Molina — Cat on a Hot Tin Roof
Best Male Performance in a Minor Role: Manuel Morón — Smoking Room; Pepe Ocio — Smoking Room; Rodrigo Poisón — El intercambio	Best Female Performance in a Minor Role: Lucía Barrado — Incendios; Ana Villa — La madre que me parió; Gloria Albalate — Mueblofília

=== Newcomers ===
Best New Actor: Eneko Sagardoy — Giant; Mon Ceballos — Estoy vivo; Xabier Murua — La cocina	Best New Actress: Itziar Castro — Skins; Esther Acebo — Money Heist; Sandra Escacena — Veronica
