= Marta Sango =

Spanish singer

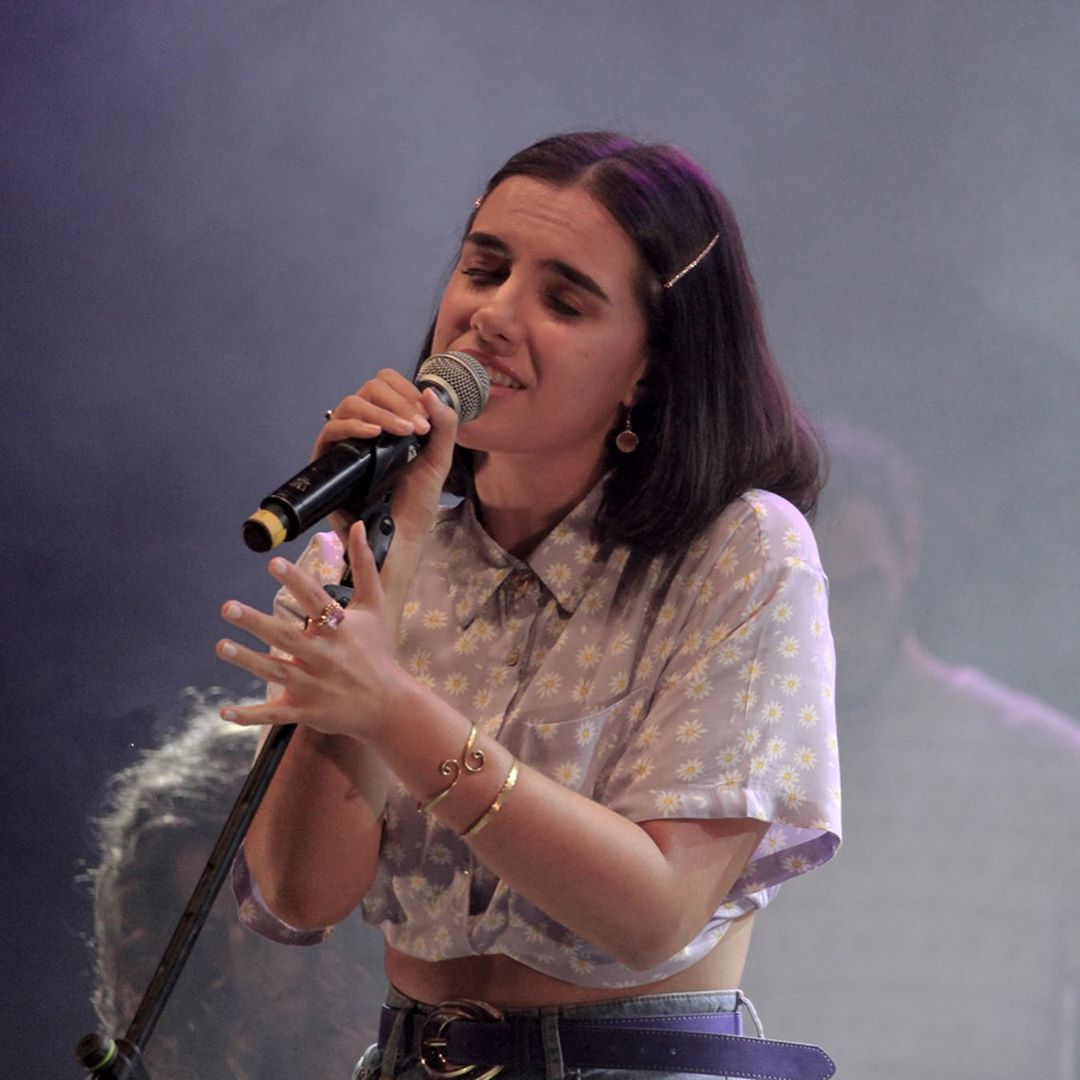
- Sango in 2019
- Born: Marta Sánchez Gómez; 28 June 2000 (age 26); Torre del Mar, Spain
- Occupation: Singer
- Years active: 2018–present

Marta Sánchez Gómez (born 28 June 2000), better known as Marta Sango, is a Spanish singer who rose to fame after her participation in the program Operación Triunfo 2018.

== Biography ==
She was born on 28 June 2000 in Torre del Mar in the province of Málaga. Since she was a child, she took electric guitar lessons, and at the age of 14, she began to attend the Coral Joven Stella Maris in her hometown, Torre del Mar. Later, she was part of the a cappella group Artmonies. At the age of 18, she entered the academy of Operación Triunfo.

== Trajectory ==
=== 2018: Operación Triunfo ===
Marta Sango participated in the casting of Operación Triunfo 2018, she managed to pass all the phases and was selected to participate in Gala 0 of the program, where she was finally chosen as one of the 16 contestants of the edition.

Among her most outstanding performances within the program are Leave Me Alone by Michael Jackson and One more try by George Michael. She was nominated on four occasions and was finally voted out on the 11th gala, occupying the 7th position in the contest.

Once the program was over, all the contestants toured Spain, performing in emblematic venues such as the WiZink Center in Madrid and the Palau Sant Jordi in Barcelona.

=== 2019: Beginnings, La Llamada, First Single ===
After leaving the academy, she participated in gala 3 of the program La Mejor Canción Jamás Cantada, where she had to interpret the song Ave María by David Bisbal, which was the winning song of this gala dedicated to the decade of the 2000s. In April, the final of the program took place, and in this opportunity, Marta Sango interpreted the song La Flaca by Jarabe de Palo, finally obtaining the third position in the program.

Since October 16, 2019, she has been playing the role of Susana Romero in the musical La Llamada.

On December 27, 2019, she released her first solo single titled Por ti under the record label Universal Music.

=== 2020 ===
On December 29, 2020, she will release her second single, ¿Qué más quieres de mí? on the Blanco y Negro Music label.

=== 2021–2022 ===
Marta Sango is currently still part of the cast of the musical La Llamada.

On December 10, 2021, RTVE announced that Marta Sango was one of the artists chosen to participate in the Benidorm Fest with her song titled Sigues en mi mente, a song with which she opted to represent Spain in the Eurovision Song Contest 2022. Finally, she would be eliminated in the second semifinal, occupying the 10th position in the festival.

On February 18, she released the intro called Disparar as a preview of her future new album to be released in 2022.

After that intro of what will be her first album, Marta released on March 25 another new single titled Escapar, with a video clip included.

At the beginning of April, it was announced that she would be part of the 'Weekend Beach Festival' held in July in Torre del Mar, her hometown.

For the second consecutive year, Marta is also part of the "Atlantic Pride" on July 8, held in A Coruña.

This same year, together with her dancers Andoni and Manu, Marta Sango was part of the promotional short film of Netflix Spain to support the candidacy of Chanel Terrero in the Eurovision Song Contest 2022.

On Friday, May 20, 2022, Marta participates as a special guest at the welcome to Cool Fest in Fuengirola, at the Miramar Shopping Center.

== Discography ==
=== Singles ===
Year	Title	Composition
2019	Por ti	Marta Sango, René, Luis Sansó Gil
2020	¿Qué más quieres de mí?	Marta Sango, René, Luis Sansó Gil
2021	Sigues en mi mente	Marta Sango, Mané López, Marco Frías
2022	Disparar	Marta Sango
2022	Escapar	Marta Sango
2022	La Corriente	Marta Sango, Rakki Ripper

=== Theater ===
Year	Play	Character	Directed by
2019-Presente	La llamada (musical)	Susana Romero	Javier Ambrossi and Javier Calvo

== Filmography ==
=== Theater ===
Year	Program	Channel	Role	Notes
2018	Operación Triunfo	La 1	Contestant	7th Position
2019	La mejor canción jamás cantada	La 1	Contestant	Gala 3(Winner), Final Gala(3rd Position)
2022	Benidorm Fest	La 1	Contestant	10th Position

=== Series ===
Year	Title	Character	Channel	Notes
2019	Paquita Salas	Herself	Netflix	Episode of the 3rd season

=== Short films ===
Year	Title	Character	Produced by
2021	Cerdo agridulce	Sabrina	Cosmic tree
2022	Calamarfest	Herself	Netflix

== Awards and nominations ==
=== BroadwayWorld Spain ===
Year	Category	Award	Result
2020	Best Lead Actress	BroadwayWorld Spain 2020	Nominated

=== Actuality Awards ===
Year	Category	Award	Result
2020	Actuality Artist	Actuality Awards 2020	Won
