= Macarena García =

Spanish actress (born 1988)

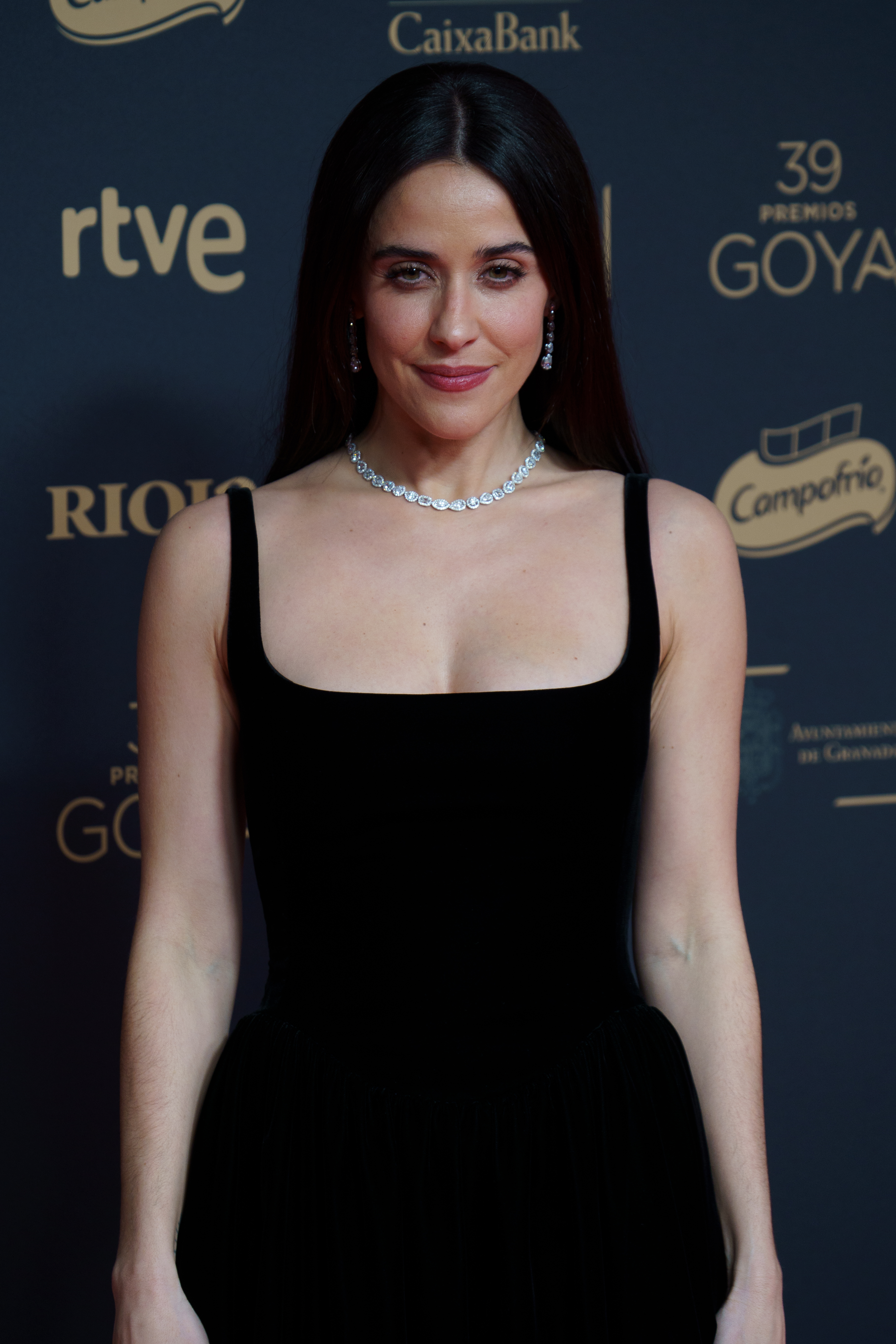
- García in 2025
- Born: Macarena García de la Camacha Gutiérrez-Ambrossi; 26 April 1988 (age 38); Madrid, Spain
- Education: Autonomous University of Madrid
- Occupation: Actress
- Years active: 2008–present
- Relatives: Javier Ambrossi (brother)

Macarena García de la Camacha Gutiérrez-Ambrossi (born 26 April 1988) is a Spanish actress. She won the Goya Award for Best New Actress for her performance in the 2012 silent film Blancanieves. She has since featured in films such as Palm Trees in the Snow (2015), Holy Camp! (2017), and A House on Fire (2024) and series such as El ministerio del tiempo and La mesías.

== Biography ==
Macarena García de la Camacha Gutiérrez-Ambrossi was born on 26 April 1988 in Madrid, the daughter of Francisco Javier García de la Camacha and wife Sofía Gutiérrez-Ambrossi. She started her training when she was eight years old with artistic gymnastics. When she was fourteen, she started combining it with dance, both modern as funk, in the Carmen Senra and Academia Broadway dance schools. Rosario Ruiz and Nora Troyani taught her how to sing. In addition, she has complemented her training with guitar classes in the last years. She has an older brother, Javier Ambrossi, also dedicated to acting. She studied psychology at the Autonomous University of Madrid. From 2014 to 2022, she was in a relationship with singer Leiva.

== Career ==
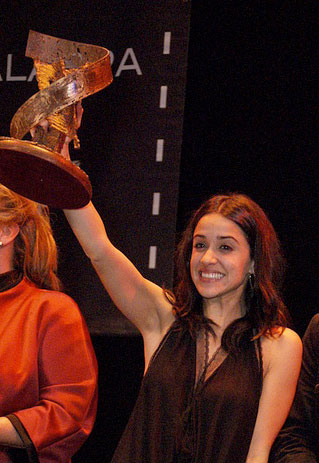
García recognised in 2012 for her performance in Snow White at the Festival CiBRA

She got her first role when she was thirteen and performed the role of Canelilla in En nombre de la Infanta Carlota, of Jara productions, a musical which was performed during some seasons in the Theatre of Madrid. She also worked in the musical High School Musical and performed the lead role (Gabriella Montez) with Daniel Diges (Troy Bolton).

Since then, she has performed in television series such as Hospital Central, Punta Escarlata and The Boarding School. She became known for her role as Chelo, the daughter of the doorman in Amar en tiempos revueltos from 2010 to 2012. In 2013, she played Vera on Luna, el misterio de Calenda, a series of Antena 3. In cinema, she played a leading role as Carmen/Blancanieves in Snow White (2012), directed by Pablo Berger. For this role, she received the Silver Shell for Best Actress at the San Sebastián International Film Festival and the Goya Award for Best New Actress.

She played the supporting role of Julia in Fernando González Molina's period romance film Palm Trees in the Snow (2015), a big-budget production for Spanish standards.

Starting in 2017, García portrayed the younger version of villain Lola Mendieta (whose senior version was performed by Natalia Millán) in the third season of time travel television series El ministerio del tiempo. Also in 2017, she starred alongside Anna Castillo in the musical comedy Holy Camp!, the debut feature film of her brother Javier Ambrossi and Javier Calvo (aka 'Los Javis'). It was the screen adaptation of Los Javis' musical play La llamada, also starred by Macarena García, which debuted at the Teatro Lara in 2013. In the fiction, she played María, a teenager who receives the call of God in a Catholic summer camp.

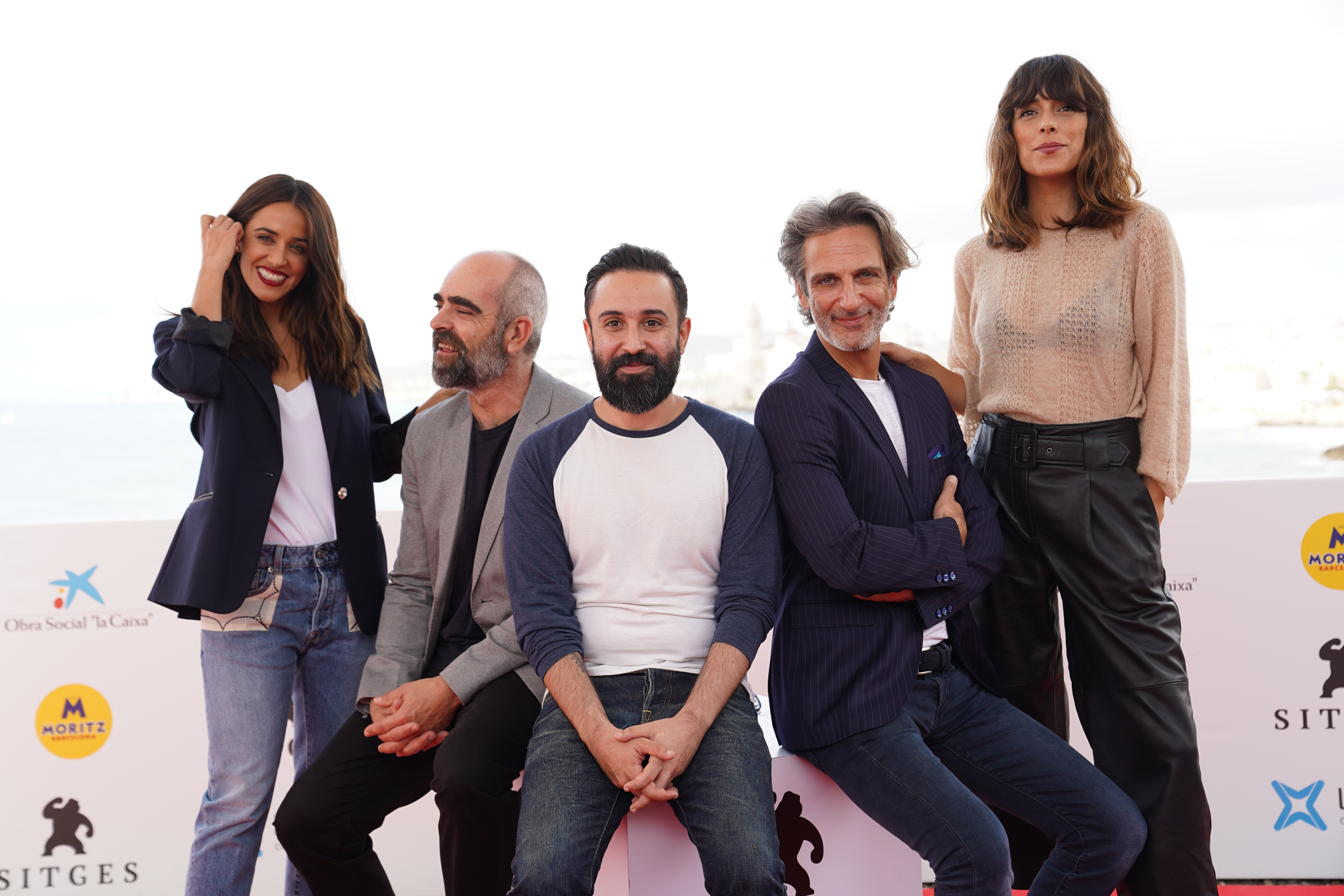
García posing along with Luis Tosar, Aritz Moreno, Ernesto Alterio, and Belén Cuesta during the presentation of Advantages of Travelling by Train at the 2019 Sitges Film Festival

She featured in the black comedy film Advantages of Travelling by Train, which was presented at the 2019 Sitges Film Festival; in the film, García appeared alongside Javier Botet in a side lovestory in Paris.

She resumed collaboration with González Molina in the television series Paradise.

In 2023, she starred in Los Javis' series La mesías, portraying the adult version of Irene / Resurrección, a face-scarred woman who has built a life as a seamstress hiding her past and her trauma after escaping from her mother's family cult. For her work in the series, she earned a nomination for the Feroz Award for Best Main Actress in a Series.

In the comedy drama film A House on Fire (2024), she portrayed the supporting character of Marta, the new girlfriend of David (Enric Auquer) who has only been in Barcelona for a few months and only knows a few words in Catalan. Her performance landed her a Goya Award nomination for Best Supporting Actress.

At the 2024 Ventana Sur film market, she was reported to have joined the cast of Ignacio Lasierra Pinto's Perseidas, due to begin shooting in late 2025.

== Filmography ==
Key
†	Denotes films that have not yet been released

=== Television ===
Title	Year	Role	Notes	Ref.
2010	El pacto	Ana Alcides	TV movie aired as 2-part miniseries	
2010	El internado (The Boarding School)	Gema	6 episodes	
2010–12	Amar en tiempos revueltos	Consuelo Muñoz Ruiz, "Chelo"	Introduced in season 6	
2011	Punta Escarlata	Raquel Solís		
2012	Amar en tiempos revueltos: La muerte a escena	Consuelo Muñoz Ruiz, "Chelo"	TV movie. Reprise of role in Amar en tiempos revueltos	
2012–13	Luna, el misterio de Calenda	Vera		
2013	Niños robados (Stolen Children)	Violeta	Senior version of the character portrayed by Manuela Paso	
2014–15	B&b, de boca en boca	Sonia		
2017–20	El ministerio del tiempo (The Department of Time)	Lola Mendieta	Younger version of the character portrayed by Natalia Millán	
2018–19	La otra mirada	Manuela Martín Casado		
2021–22	Paraíso (Paradise)	Paula Costa		
2023	La Mesías	Irene / Resurrección		
2026	Se tiene que morir mucha gente †			

=== Film ===
Title	Year	Role	Notes	Ref.
2012	Blancanieves (Snow White)	Carmen	Young version of the character (Carmencita) portrayed by Sofía Oria	
2013	Todos están muertos (They Are All Dead)	Nadia		
2015	Palmeras en la nieve (Palm Trees in the Snow)	Julia		
2016	Villaviciosa de al lado (A Stroke of Luck)	Sole		
2017	La llamada (Holy Camp!)	María		
2018	Que baje Dios y lo vea (Holy Goalie)	Sara		
2019	A pesar de todo (Despite Everything)	Lucía		
2019	Ventajas de viajar en tren (Advantages of Travelling by Train)	Rosa		
2020	El arte de volver (The Art of Return)	Noemí		
2024	Casa en flames (A House on Fire)	Marta		
2024	Un hipster en la España vacía (A Hipster in Rural Spain)	Lina		
2025	Un hijo (A Son)	María		

== Accolades ==
Year	Award	Category	Work	Result	Ref.
2012	21st Actors and Actresses Union Awards	Best Television Actress in a Minor Role	Amar en tiempos revueltos	Nominated	
2012	60th San Sebastian International Film Festival	Silver Shell for Best Actress	Snow White	Won	
2013	18th Forqué Awards	Best Actress	Snow White	Nominated	
2013	68th CEC Medals	Best New Actress	Snow White	Won	
2013	27th Goya Awards	Best New Actress	Snow White	Won	
2014	Fotogramas de Plata	Best Stage Actress	La llamada	Won	
2016	25th Actors and Actresses Union Awards	Best Film Actress in a Secondary Role	Palm Trees in the Snow	Nominated	
2024	11th Feroz Awards	Best Main Actress in a Series	La mesías	Nominated	
2025	39th Goya Awards	Best Supporting Actress	A House on Fire	Nominated	
2025	33rd Actors and Actresses Union Awards	Best Film Actress in a Secondary Role	A House on Fire	Nominated	
2026	32nd Forqué Awards	Best Actress in a Series	Many People Need to Die	Pending	
