= Feroz Award for Best Film Poster =

Annual Spanish film award

- Awarded for: Best Poster of a Spanish Film
- Country: Spain
- Presented by: Asociación de Informadores Cinematográficos de España
- Currently held by: Octavio Terol, Lluís Tudela – Salve Maria (2025)

The Feroz Award for Best Film Poster (Spanish: Premio Feroz al mejor cartel) is one of the annual awards given at the Feroz Awards, presented by the Asociación de Informadores Cinematográficos de España.

It was first presented in 2014. José Haro, Urko Errazquin and Natalia Montes were the first recipients of the award for their work in the comedy film Three Many Weddings.

== Winners and nominees ==
=== 2010s ===
Year	English title	Original title	Recipient(s)/Work
2014	Three Many Weddings	3 bodas de más	José Haro, Urko Errazquin, Natalia Montes
2014	I'm So Excited	Los amantes pasajeros	Javier Mariscal
2014	Barcelona, nit d'estiu		Jordi Rins
2014	Cannibal	Caníbal	Natalia Montes, Mario Scandurra
2014	Stockholm		Keko Pontes
2015	Magical Girl		Carlos Vermut
2015	Hidden Away	A escondidas	Priscila Clementti
2015	Marshland	La isla mínima	Sergio González, Julio Vergne, Cristina Sutherland
2015	Loreak		Iker Ayestarán
2015	Carmina and Amen	Carmina y amén	Álvaro León Acosta, Luis León Acosta
2016	Requirements to Be a Normal Person	Requisitos para ser una persona normal	Natalia Montes
2016	The Apostate	El apóstata	Santiago Guidotti, Begoña Aróstegui
2016	A Perfect Day	Un día perfecto	Sergio González Kuhn
2016	The Romantic Exiles	Los exiliados románticos	Clara León
2016	Negotiator	Negociador	Iñaki Villuendas, Jorge Alvariño
2016	The Bride	La novia	Jesús Rodrigo Bosqued
2017	Smoke & Mirrors	El hombre de las mil caras	Gabriel Moreno
2017	The Fury of a Patient Man	Tarde para la ira	Iñaki Villuendas, Manolo Pavón
2017	Julieta		Nico Bustos, Sergio González Khun
2017	Kiki, Love to Love	Kiki, el amor se hace	Álvaro León Acosta, Luis León Acosta, Virginia Velasco Ramírez
2017	A Monster Calls		Blair Green, José Haro
2018	Giant	Handia	Iñaki Villuendas
2018	The Bar	El bar	Sergio González Kuhn
2018	Skins	Pieles	Sergio González Kuhn
2018	Holy Camp!	La llamada	Natalia Montes, José Haro
2018	Summer 1993	Estiu 1993	Olga Ortiz
2019	Quién te cantará		Carlos Vermut
2019	Ana by Day	Ana de día	Bárbara Magdalena
2019	Distances	Les distàncies	Elena Castillo
2019	Sunday's Illness	La enfermedad del domingo	Jordi Rins
2019	The Realm	El reino	Gonzalo Rute

=== 2020s ===
Year	English title	Original title	Recipient(s)
2020	El crack cero		Miguel Navia
2020	The Platform	El hoyo	Eduardo García
2020	The August Virgin	La virgen de agosto	Laura Renau
2020	Fire Will Come	O que arde	Aitor Errazquin, Carlos Hidalgo
2020	Advantages of Travelling by Train	Ventajas de viajar en tren	José Ángel Peña
2021	Rifkin's Festival		Jordi Labanda
2021	Coven	Akelarre	Natalia Montes
2021	The Art of Return	El arte de volver	Pablo Dávila, Espinar Gabriel
2021	The Europeans	Los europeos	David de las Heras
2021	The Queen of the Lizards	La reina de los lagartos	Alfredo Borés, Berta González
2022	Parallel Mothers	Madres paralelas	Javier Jaén
2022	The Grandmother	La abuela	Octavio Terol, Jorge Alvariño
2022	Destello bravío		Beatriz Riber, Santiago Cubides
2022	Dos		Pablo Sánchez
2022	Libertad		Jordi Trilla
2023	Manticore	Mantícora	Carlos Vermut
2023	The Beasts	As bestas	Jordi Rins, Lucía Faraig
2023	Piggy	Cerdita	Eduardo García, Jorge Fuembuena
2023	Wild Flowers	Girasoles silvestres	Gonzalo Rute, Quim Vives
2023	The Rite of Spring	La consagración de la primavera	Mica Murphy
2024	Robot Dreams		José Luis Ágreda
2024	20,000 Species of Bees	20.000 especies de abejas	Cristina Hernández Bernardo
2024	Close Your Eyes	Cerrar los ojos	Sergio Rozas, Manolo Pavón
2024	The Rye Horn	O corno	Alejandro Llamas Sánchez
2024	Sister Death	Hermana muerte	Iñaki Villuendas, José Haro
2025	Salve Maria		Octavio Terol, Lluís Tudela
2025	A House on Fire	Casa en flames	Jordi Rins
2025	The Blue Star	La estrella azul	Laura Pere
2025	The Room Next Door		Juan Gatti, Nico Bustos
2025	They Will Be Dust	Polvos serán	Emilio Lorente, Lluís Tudela
2026	Afternoons of Solitude	Tardes de soledad	Ana Domínguez, Rafa Castañer
2026	Sundays	Los domingos	Jimena Merino, Álvaro León, Luis León, David Herranz
2026	Away	Molt lluny	Dan Petris, Jaume Caldés
2026	Romería		Jose A. Peña, Quim Vives
2026	Sirāt		Daniel Requena, Alba Vence, Quim Vives
