= Javier Calvo (actor) =

Spanish actor, director and writer

- Calvo in 2026
- Born: Javier Calvo Guirao; 21 January 1991 (age 35); Murcia, Spain
- Occupations: Actor; stage director; film director; television director; writer
- Years active: 2007–present
- Partner: Javier Ambrossi (2010–2025)

Francisco Javier Calvo Guirao (born 21 January 1991) known professionally as Javier Calvo is a Spanish actor and filmmaker. He first achieved fame in Spain for his role of Fernando "Fer" Redondo in the television series Física o Química (2008–2011). Calvo and his former partner Javier Ambrossi began a professional partnership (widely known as 'Los Javis') by writing and directing the stage play La llamada (2013), with its success leading to a film adaptation released in 2017. Calvo and Ambrossi later developed the television series Paquita Salas (2016–present), Veneno (2020–2023) and its sequel Vestidas de azul (2023–2024), and La mesías (2023), as well as the film La bola negra (2026). He has received several awards including wins in both the Feroz Awards and Fotogramas de Plata, and has received nominations for two Goya Awards. For the film La bola negra, Calvo and Ambrossi won the Cannes Film Festival Award for Best Director.

== Career ==
Calvo began acting in theatre at age 11, eventually appearing in the 2007 film Doctor Infierno. Beginning in 2008, he starred in the Antena 3 television series Física o Química, portraying gay teenager Fernando "Fer" Redondo. He participated in the show for four years, totaling seven seasons due to the show's popularity which would motivate a 2020 reunion in the form of a two-part miniseries. Focusing on problems such as drugs, addiction, anorexia and sexual orientation, the series attracted much controversy. Calvo considers the themes of the series "problems that are also present in reality". He, however, received critical acclaim for portraying a gay male in his debut role. Early into his career, he would also appear in the comedy web series Are you APP? (2012) portraying the character Samuel.

In May 2012 a fan-conference with Calvo took place in Moscow, Russia.

Since 2013, Calvo co-directs La llamada at the Teatro Lara in Madrid, a musical he created alongside Javier Ambrossi. The musical follows two teenagers María and Susana who are attending an annual Christian summer camp run by nuns, dealing with themes of faith, music, and love. The play has found great success, growing from an underground show to surpass 1.5 million attendants in 2022. The musical's cast has included Macarena García, Anna Castillo, Gracia Olaya, Belén Cuesta, Richard Collins-Moore, Andrea Ros, and Claudia Traisac, many of whom would get their start with the play. The production has won several awards including 13 BroadwayWorld Spain awards, a Premio del Teatro Musical, and a Fotograma de Plata.

In 2014, he would return to acting with supporting role appearances in the Spanish soap opera Amar es para siempre and the Spanish television series Los misterios de Laura. A year later, in August 2015, the Mexican production of La llamada opened at the López Tarso theatre in Mexico City, with a Mexican cast including star Laura Zapata. In 2015, Calvo participated in the filming of Russian movie Koridor Bessmertiya (in English, Convoy 48; 2019), in which Calvo would portray a young Spaniard exiled to Russia due to Civil War.

In July 2016 the web television series Paquita Salas, created by Calvo and Ambrossi, premiered on Flooxer. The series would star Brays Efe, portraying the talent agent Paquita Salas, representing the mundane behind-the-scenes work to many actors' success. Although fictional, the show takes inspiration from real-life events including the industry experiences of Calvo. Due to the success of the series, Netflix acquired the rights to air the second season. The series currently has three seasons, and will return for a fourth according to actress Belén Cuesta, though Calvo stated in a 2023 interview that he and Ambrossi "are in a different moment" and are choosing to focus their efforts on other projects.

In September 2017, the film adaptation of La llamada, directed by Calvo and Ambrossi, premiered in Spain. The film crew included many of the original creators, directors, and the musical's popular actresses Macarena García, Ana Castillo, Belén Cuesta, and Gracía Olayo. New characters were also added in the film version, and were portrayed by María Isabel Días and Secun de la Rosa. The film garnered several award nominations, most notably winning two Feroz Awards and a Goya Award.

Along with Ambrossi, Calvo was listed 47th in El Mundo's list of most important LGBT people in Spain in 2017.

From October 2017 to January 2018, Calvo and Ambrossi appeared on reality television talent competition Operación Triunfo as acting teachers in the program's "Academy". In 2017, they would meet and mentor that year's winner Amaia Romero, who would later join the cast of Calvo and Ambrossi's La Mesías (2023). After the firing of acting teacher Itziar Castro in 2018, 'Los Javis' would return to their original position as teachers for the remainder of the season.

In 2020, the Calvo and Ambrossi-created biographical television limited series Veneno aired on Atresplayer Premium and HBO Max. Calvo collaborated as writer, director, and producer to create the miniseries inspired by the life of Cristina Ortiz, popularly known as La Veneno, a famous transgender woman, actress, singer, sex worker, and model from Madrid, Spain. The directing duo were inspired by ¡Digo! Ni puta ni santa: Las memorias de la Veneno, a biography written by Valeria Vega on the life of Cristina Ortiz. Portrayed by Jedet Sánchez, Daniela Santiago, and Isabel Torres at different points in her life, La Veneno's legacy of giving visibility to LGBTQ community was reinvigorated by the show. Due to the COVID-19 pandemic, rather than the full series, only the first episode would reach streaming by March 2020, followed by the second episode in June of that year. The third episode would be released in theaters before streaming, showing alongside the first two episodes on 17 September 2020, opening at the top of the Spanish box office. Streaming on HBO Max, the show would receive Spanish and international acclaim, with Calvo winning two Iris Awards and a Fotograma de Plata for his efforts. Calvo and Ambrossi received a Premio Arcoíris awarded by the Spanish Ministry of Equality during its first ceremony on 28 June 2021 (International Pride Day), for the trans visibility made byVeneno.

Since 2020, Calvo is a panelist for Mask Singer: Adivina quién canta, the Spanish version of the international music game show Masked Singer. On 1 March 2021, Calvo was announced as a judge for Drag Race España, the Spanish version of the television drag queen competition Drag Race.

In 2021, Javier Calvo and Javier Ambrossi founded their production company Suma Content, an extension of their label since 2013 of Suma Latina. The new company would expand in size from its predecessor and allow the pair to work on more than one project each year. Its first projects and collaborations would include Christmas TV special Una navidad con Samantha Hudson (2021) and the fictional series Cardo (2021–2023).

In 2023, the family thriller television series La Mesías, created, written and directed by Calvo and Ambrossi for Movistar Plus+, and in collaboration with Suma Content was included out of competition in the official section of the 71st San Sebastián International Film Festival. The series follows Enric (Roger Casamajor) and his family trauma due to his mother's religious fanaticism and controlling, delusional nature. For La Mesias, Calvo and Ambrossi received Bes Director prize at 2024 Series Mania.

In 2023, 'Los Javis' also created the upcoming drama television series Vestidas de azul for Atresplayer Premium, a spin-off and continuation for Veneno. The series is based on the book Vestidas de azul by Valeria Vegas, detailing the lives of six women in Antonio Giménez-Rico's documentary of the same name. Calvo and Ambrossi would work as producers for the project with Suma Content, with its directors being Mikel Rueda, Claudia Costafreda, and Ian de La Rosa. The plot follows six transgender women, exploring their experiences throughout time.

On 10 February 2024, Calvo will co-host the 38th Goya Awards, alongside Ambrossi and actress and singer Ana Belén.

== Personal life ==
Calvo is fluent in English.

In 2012, Calvo started a relationship with actor and director Javier Ambrossi. The writer-director pair are popularly known as 'Los Javis'. The couple shares a tattoo stating 'Lo hacemos y ya vemos' translating to 'We'll do it and we'll see'. Calvo has an active social media presence, often changes his hairstyle, and collaborated with Ambrossi on the fashion line As If. 'Los Javis' have also claimed that early in the production of La llamada (the musical version), they had to purchase many stage props themselves, including two beds for 100 euros on eBay, despite having little finances at the time. In November 2025, the couple announced their separation after 13 years together.

== Filmography ==
=== As actor ===
Film
Year	Title	Role
2007	Doctor Infierno	Bombero Johnny
2009	El enigma Giacomo	Concierge
2019	Convoy 48 (Koridor bessmertiya)	Exiled Spaniard

Television
Year	Title	Role	Notes
2008–2011	Física o Química	Fernando "Fer" Redondo	77 episodes
2012–2013	Are You APP?	Samuel	5 episodes
2014	Los misterios de Laura	Guillermo Vasco	1 episode
2014	Amar es para siempre	Celso	1 episode
2017–2018	Operación Triunfo	Acting teacher	
2018	Looser	Himself	1 episode; Also executive producer
2018	Trabajo temporal	Himself	1 episode
2019	La otra mirada	Jorge Merlot	1 episode
2020	Veneno	Police Officer	1 episode; Also writer, creator, and director
2020–2021	Physics or Chemistry: The Reunion	Fer	2 episodes
2020–present	Mask Singer: Adivina quién canta	Panelist	8 episodes
2021–present	Drag Race España	Judge	Season 1—present
2022	Dos años y un día	Himself	1 episode
2023	La Mesías	Police Officer 1	1 episode; Also writer, creator, and director
2024–present	Drag Race España All Stars	Judge	Season 1—present

=== As filmmaker ===
Film
Year	English title	Original title	Notes
2017	Holy Camp!	La llamada	Writer, director, executive producer
2026	La bola negra		Writer, director, producer

Television
Year	Title	Role	Notes
2016–present	Paquita Salas	Writer, creator, and director	16 episodes
2018	Looser	Executive producer	6 episodes
2019	Terror y feria	Executive producer	6 episodes
2020	Veneno	Writer, creator, and director	8 episodes
2021	Una Navidad con Samantha Hudson	Producer	TV special
2021–present	Cardo	Producer	12 episodes
2023	La Mesías	Writer, creator, producer, and director	7 episodes
2023	Vestidas de azul	Producer	7 episodes

== Awards and nominations ==
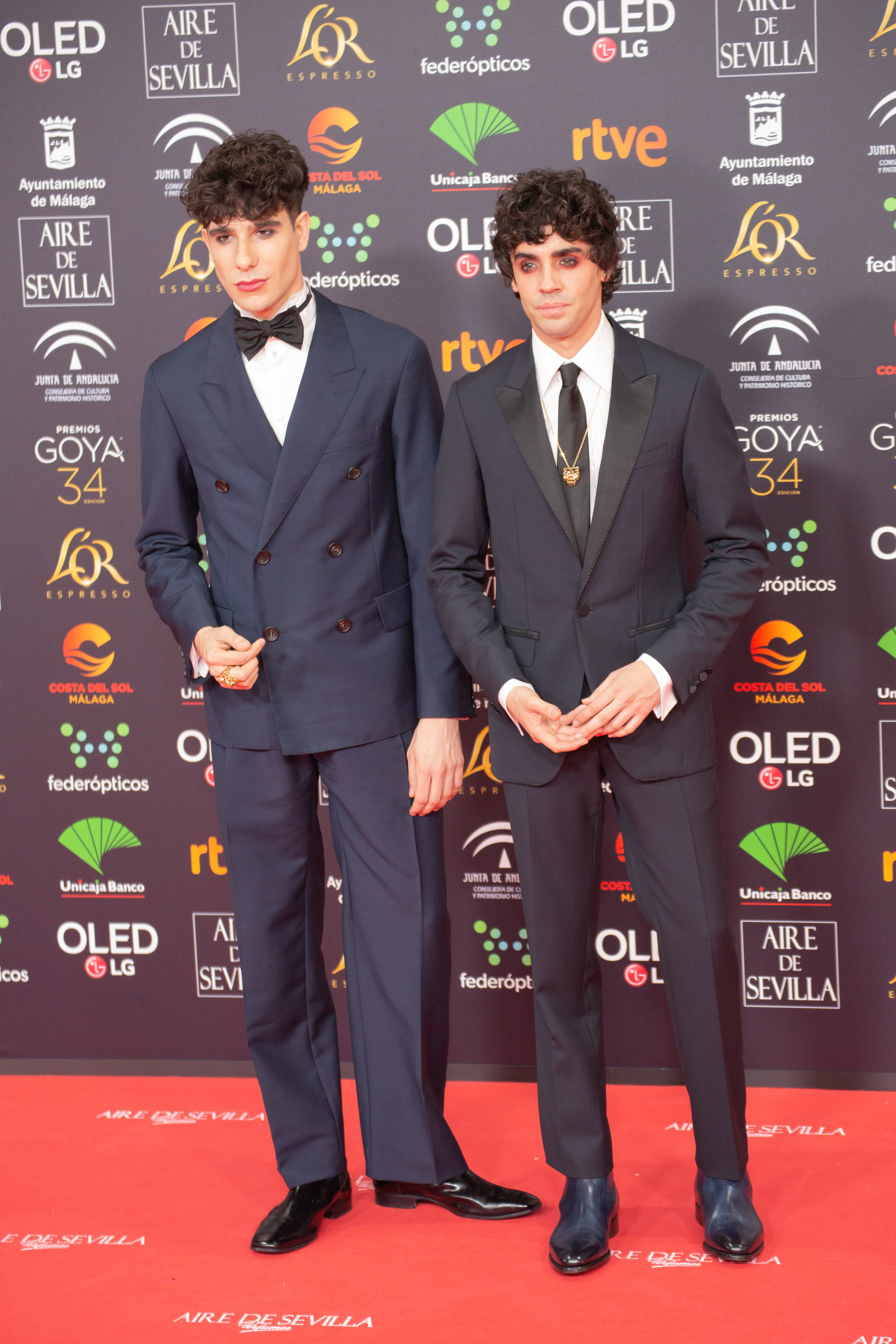
Javier Calvo (left) and Javier Ambrossi at the 2020 Goya Awards.

Award	Year	Category	Work	Result	Ref.
Cannes Film Festival	2026	Best Director	La bola negra	Won (Note: Tied with Paweł Pawlikowski for Fatherland)	
CEC Awards	2018	Best Adapted Screenplay	Holy Camp!	Nominated	
CEC Awards	2018	Best New Director	Holy Camp!	Nominated	
Feroz Awards	2017	Best Comedy Series	Paquita Salas	Won	
Feroz Awards	2018	Best Comedy Film	Holy Camp!	Won	
Feroz Awards	2019	Best Comedy Series	Paquita Salas	Nominated	
Feroz Awards	2020	Best Comedy Series	Paquita Salas	Nominated	
Feroz Awards	2021	Best Drama Series	Veneno	Nominated	
Feroz Awards	2024	Best Drama Series	La mesías	Won	
Feroz Awards	2024	Best Screenplay in a Series	La mesías	Won	
Feroz Awards	2026	Best Comedy Series	Superstar	Nominated	
Fotogramas de Plata	2018	Best Spanish Film	Holy Camp!	Won	
Fotogramas de Plata	2020	Best Spanish Series	Veneno	Won	
Gaudí Awards	2018	Best Non-Catalan Language Film	Holy Camp!	Nominated	
Gaudí Awards	2018	Audience Award	Holy Camp!	Won	
Goya Awards	2018	Best Adapted Screenplay	Holy Camp!	Nominated	
Goya Awards	2018	Best New Director	Holy Camp!	Nominated	
Iris Awards	2019	Best Screenplay	Paquita Salas	Nominated	
Iris Awards	2019	Best Director	Paquita Salas	Nominated	
Iris Awards	2020	Best Director	Veneno	Won	
Iris Awards	2020	Critics' Award	Veneno	Won	
Iris Awards	2025	Best Screenplay – Fiction	La mesías	Won	
Iris Awards	2025	Best Direction – Fiction	La mesías	Won	
Iris Awards	2025	Best Production – Fiction	La mesías	Nominated	
Málaga Film Festival	2022	Málaga Talent Award	—N/a	Honored	
Series Mania	2024	Best Directing	La mesías	Won	
