= Feroz Award for Best Drama Series =

Annual Spanish television award

- Awarded for: Best Spanish Drama Series
- Country: Spain
- Presented by: Asociación de Informadores Cinematográficos de España
- Currently held by: Querer (2025)

The Feroz Award for Best Drama Series (Spanish: Premio Feroz a la mejor serie dramática) is one of the annual awards given at the Feroz Awards, presented by the Asociación de Informadores Cinematográficos de España. It was first presented in 2017, in that year, the Feroz Awards began presenting television categories, prior to that, only film categories were presented.

== Winners and nominees ==
=== 2010s ===
Year	English title	Original title	Network
2017	The Ministry of Time	El ministerio del tiempo	La 1
2017	Mar de plástico		Antena 3
2017	Locked Up	Vis a vis	Antena 3
2017	El Caso. Crónica de sucesos		La 1
2017	Merlí		TV3
2018	La zona		#0
2018	Money Heist	La casa de papel	Antena 3
2018	Estoy vivo		La 1
2018	The Ministry of Time	El ministerio del tiempo	La 1
2018	I Know Who You Are	Sé quién eres	Telecinco
2019	Cocaine Coast	Fariña	Antena 3
2019	El día de mañana		Movistar+
2019	Gigantes		Movistar+
2019	La peste		Movistar+
2019	Élite		Netflix

=== 2020s ===
Year	English title	Original title	Recipient(s)	Network
2020	Hierro			Movistar+
2020	Foodie Love			HBO Spain
2020	En el corredor de la muerte			Movistar+
2020	La peste			Movistar+
2020	Money Heist	La casa de papel		Netflix
2021	Riot Police	Antidisturbios	Rodrigo Sorogoyen and Isabel Peña	Movistar+
2021	30 Coins	30 monedas	Álex de la Iglesia	HBO Europe
2021	Patria		Aitor Gabilondo	HBO Europe
2021	Veneno		Javier Calvo and Javier Ambrossi	Atresplayer Premium
2021	The Ministry of Time	El ministerio del tiempo	Javier Olivares and Pablo Olivares	La 1
2022	Cardo		Ana Rujas and Claudia Costafreda	Atresplayer Premium
2022	The Time It Takes	El tiempo que te doy	Nadia de Santiago, Pablo Santidrián and Inés Pintor	Netflix
2022	La Fortuna		Alejandro Amenábar	Movistar+
2022	Hierro		Pepe Coira	Movistar+
2022	Stories to Stay Awake	Historias para no dormir	Alejandro Ibáñez and Victor García	Prime Video
2023	The Route	La ruta	Montse García, Eduardo Villanueva and Nacho Lavilla	Atresplayer Premium
2023	¡García!		Miguel Salvat, Steve Matthews, Antonio Asensio and Paloma Molina	HBO Max
2023	Offworld	Apagón	Domingo Corral, Ignacio Corrales, Fran Araújo and Rafael Portela	Movistar Plus+
2023	Intimacy	Intimidad	Marian Fernández Pascal, Jorge Torregrosa and Laura Sarmiento	Netflix
2023	Rapa		Domingo Corral, Alfonso Blanco, Carla Pérez de Albéniz and Susana Herreras	Movistar Plus+
2024	La mesías		Fran Araújo, Susana Herreras, Javier Ambrossi and Javier Calvo	Movistar Plus+
2024	Burning Body	El cuerpo en llamas	Ibon Cormenzana, Andrea Martínez and Jorge Torregrossa	Netflix
2024	The Left-Handed Son	El hijo zurdo	Fran Araújo, Alberto Félez, Cristina Sutherland and José Antonio Félez	Movistar Plus+
2024	Rapa		Domingo Corral, Susana Herreras and Alfonso Blanco	Movistar Plus+
2024	Selftape		Joana Vilapuig, Mireia Vilapuig, Ivan Mercadé and Jaume Ripoll	Filmin
2025	Querer		Susana Herreras, Fran Araújo, Juan Moreno and Koldo Zuazua	Movistar Plus+
2025	The New Years	Los años nuevos	Domingo Corral, Fran Araújo, Nacho Lavilla and Eduardo Villanueva	Movistar Plus+
2025	Cristóbal Balenciaga		Xabi Berzosa and Sofía Fábregas	Disney+
2025	See You in Another Life	Nos vemos en otra vida	Jorge Sánchez-Cabezudo, Alberto Sánchez-Cabezudo, Sofía Fábregas and Koldo Zuazua	Disney+
2025	I, Addict	Yo, adicto	Sofía Fábregas, Aitor Gabilondo, Laura Rubirola and Javier Giner	Disney+
