= Belén Cuesta =

Spanish actress (born 1984)

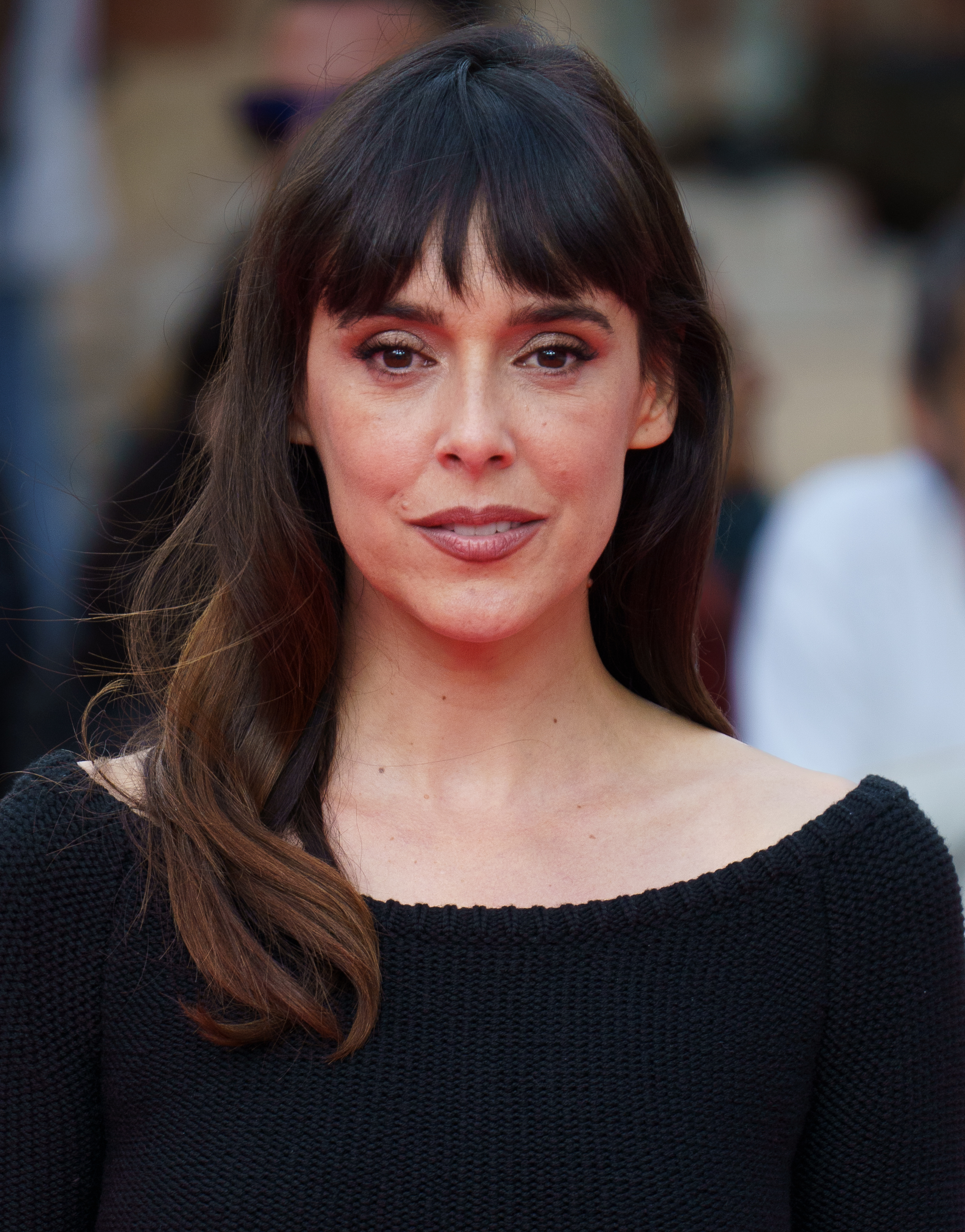
- Cuesta in 2025
- Born: Belén Cuesta Llamas; 24 January 1984 (age 42); Seville, Andalusia, Spain
- Occupation: Actress
- Years active: 2004–present
- Children: 1

Belén Cuesta Llamas (born 24 January 1984) is a Spanish actress. She rose to prominence for her performance as Magüi in the comedy series Paquita Salas. She won the Goya Award for Best Actress for her leading performance in the drama film The Endless Trench (2019).

== Early life ==
Belén Cuesta Llamas was born on 24 January 1984 in Seville, Spain. She moved to Málaga and her childhood and adolescence was spent in Fuengirola, where she studied at the Escuela Superior de Arte Dramático. She currently resides in Madrid.

== Career ==
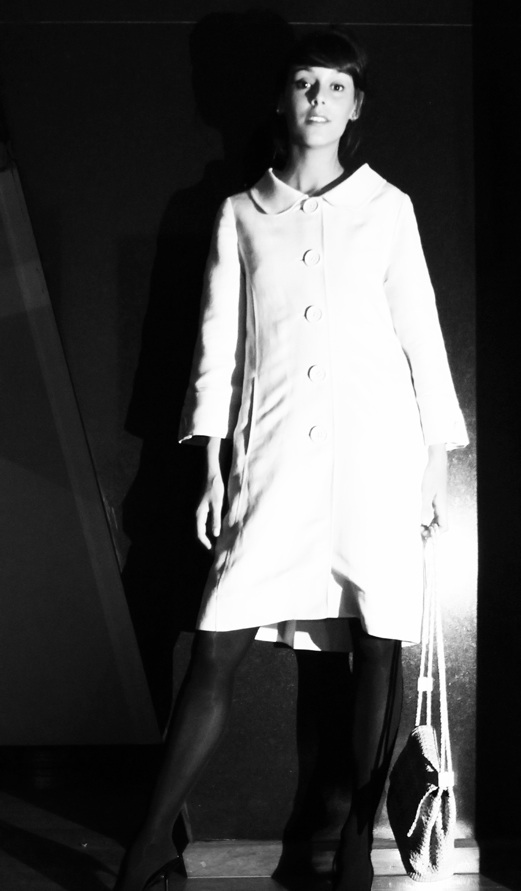
Cuesta in 2007

Cuesta is mostly known as a theatre actress. She has participated in both film and television productions as well as television commercials.

She made her television debut in Cazadores de hombres. After featuring in minor roles in television series such as ¿Qué fue de Jorge Sanz?, Ángel o demonio, Palomitas and films such as Hierro, Operación Malaya and Perro flaco, she landed her first stable television role in 2012, when she joined period drama daily television series Bandolera to portray Elisa de Vega, a wealthy woman. She starred in comedy series Paquita Salas. Her role as Magüi Moreno, assistant to the title character in the aforementioned series, earned her great popularity with some of her lines becoming viral.

A cisgender woman, Cuesta featured in Money Heist as Manila (a transgender woman and Denver's friend), initially passing as a hostage in the Bank of Spain, later disclosed to be a member of the band of robbers.

== Personal life ==
From 2012 to early 2023, Cuesta was in a relationship with actor Tamar Novas, whom she met during the filming of Bandolera.

In early 2023 she started a new relationship and in December 2023 she gave birth to her first daughter.

== Credits ==
=== Theater ===
Year	Title	Character	Director
2004–05	Ifigenia en Táuride		Ignacio Ortiz
2006	Malditas sean por siempre Coronada y sus hijas		Pablo Mesa
2006	Enrico V		
2007	Una mujer sin importancia		Hermanas Rico
2007	Me muero, me muero		Hermanas Rico
2008	Acóplate		Hermanas Rico
2008	Sonias		Hermanas Rico
2009	Las fichas		
2010	Labios		Alejandra Nogales
2011	El imaginario de Cervantes		Sonia Sebastián
2011	Te acuerdas		
2011	Soy actriz		
2011	Lo que da miedo es la muerte		
2011	Papá se ha ido		Sonia Sebastián
2012	Presencias		Benja de la Rosa
2012	¿Quién es Teodoro?		
2013–16	La llamada	Hermana Milagros	Javier Calvo and Javier Ambrossi
2016	Los tragos de la vida		Daniel Guzmán
2017	Universos Paralelos	Lucía	David Serrano
2019	Metamorfosis		David Serrano
2019	El hombre almohada	Katurian	David Serrano

=== Television ===
Year	Title	Role	Notes	Ref.
2008	Cazadores de hombres		2 episodes	
2010	¿Qué fue de Jorge Sanz?	Nurse	1 episode	
2011	Palomitas		9 episodes	
2011	Ángel o demonio		1 episode	
2012	Operación Malaya	Clara	TV movie	
2012	Bandolera	Elisa de Vega		
2013	El tiempo entre costuras (The Time in Between)	Parturient	1 episode	
2015	Aquí Paz y después Gloria	Tere		
2015	Vis a vis	Yolanda Montero Fernández	2 episodes	
2016	Buscando el norte	Carolina		
2016–19	Paquita Salas	Magüi "Malu" Moreno	14 episodes	
2017–18	Ella es tu padre	Natalia	13 episodes	
2018	BByC: Bodas, bautizos y comuniones	Beatriz	1 episode	
2019	Mira lo que has hecho		4 episodes	
2019–21	La casa de papel	Julia "Manila"	20 episodes	
2023	Cristo y Rey (Untameable)	Bárbara Rey		
2023	Romancero	Carmen		
2024	Cristóbal Balenciaga	Fabiola de Mora y Aragón		
2024	Las largas sombras (Past Lies)	Teresa		

=== Movies ===
Year	Title	Role	Notes	Ref.
2009	Hierro		Feature film debut	
2011	Perro flaco	Natalia		
2012	La montaña rusa	Pretty girl		
2015	Ocho apellidos catalanes (Spanish Affair 2)	Judit		
2016	Tenemos que hablar (We Need to Talk)	Yoli		
2016	El pregón	Silvia		
2016	Kiki, el amor se hace (Kiki, Love to Love)	Belén		
2016	Storks	Tulip	Voice	
2016	Villaviciosa de al lado (A Stroke of Luck)	Elisa		
2017	La llamada (Holy Camp!)	Hermana Milagros		
2017	Proyecto Tiempo. Parte I: La llave	Carla		
2017	The Lego Ninjago Movie	Nya	Voice	
2018	El aviso (The Warning)	Andrea		
2019	A pesar de todo (Despite Everything)	Claudia		
2019	Ventajas de viajar en tren (Advantages of Travelling by Train)	Amelia Urales de Úbeda		
2019	Litus	Laia		
2019	La frontera infinita (The Endless Trench)	Rosa		
2019	Klaus	Teacher/Fish Saleswoman	Voice	
2019	Parking	María		
2020	Hasta que la boda nos separe (The Wedding Unplanner)	Marina		
2020	Sentimental (The People Upstairs)	Laura		
2022	Un novio para mi mujer (A Boyfriend for My Wife)	Lucía		
2023	El cuco (The Cuckoo's Curse)	Anna		
2026	Cortafuego (Firebreak)	Mara		
2026	5 minutos más (5 More Minutes)	Bárbara		
2026	El niño (The Child)	Mariaje		

=== Television programs ===
Year	Program	Channel	Notes
2014	En el aire	La Sexta	Collaborator
2015–2019	Pasapalabra	Telecinco	Guest
2016	El Hormiguero	Antena 3	Guest
2016	Late Motiv	#0	Guest
2018	Operación Triunfo	La 1	Guest
2018	The Resistance	#0	Guest
2020	Late Motiv	#0	Guest

== Accolades ==
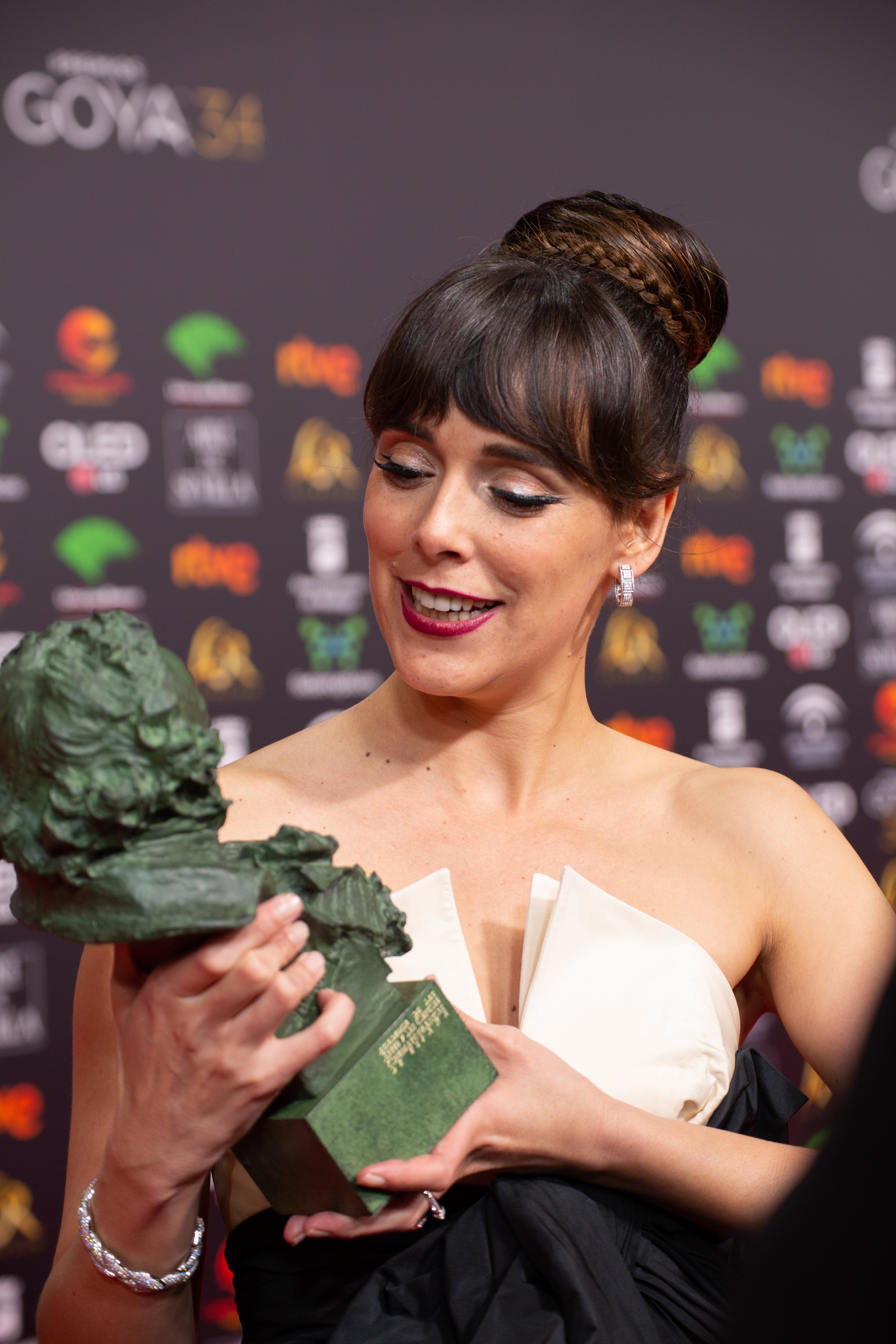
Cuesta looking at her Goya Award for Best Actress for The Endless Trench

Year	Award	Category	Work	Result	Ref.
2015	24th Actors and Actresses Union Awards	Best Stage Actress in a Minor Role	La llamada	Nominated	
2017	4th Feroz Awards	Best Supporting Actress in a Series	Paquita Salas	Won	
2017	31st Goya Awards	Best New Actress	Kiki, Love to Love	Nominated	
2018	5th Feroz Awards	Best Supporting Actress in a Film	Holy Camp!	Nominated	
2018	73rd CEC Awards	Best Supporting Actress	Holy Camp!	Nominated	
2018	32nd Goya Awards	Best Supporting Actress	Holy Camp!	Nominated	
2018	27th Actors and Actresses Union Awards	Best Film Actress in a Secondary Role	Holy Camp!	Nominated	
2019	6th Feroz Awards	Best Supporting Actress in a Series	Paquita Salas	Nominated	
2020	25th Forqué Awards	Best Actress	The Endless Trench	Nominated	
2020	7th Feroz Awards	Best Actress in a Film	The Endless Trench	Won	
2020	7th Feroz Awards	Best Supporting Actress in a Series	Paquita Salas	Nominated	
2020	34th Goya Awards	Best Actress	The Endless Trench	Won	
2020	29th Actors and Actresses Union Awards	Best Film Actress in a Leading Role	The Endless Trench	Won	
2020	7th Platino Awards	Best Actress	The Endless Trench	Nominated	
2020	70th Fotogramas de Plata	Best Film Actress	The Endless Trench	Won	
2023	2nd Carmen Awards	Best Actress	A Boyfriend for My Wife	Nominated	
2023	25th Iris Awards	Best Actress	Untameable	Won	
2025	33rd Actors and Actresses Union Awards	Best Television Actress in a Minor Role	Cristóbal Balenciaga	Nominated	
