= Rapa (TV series) =

Television series

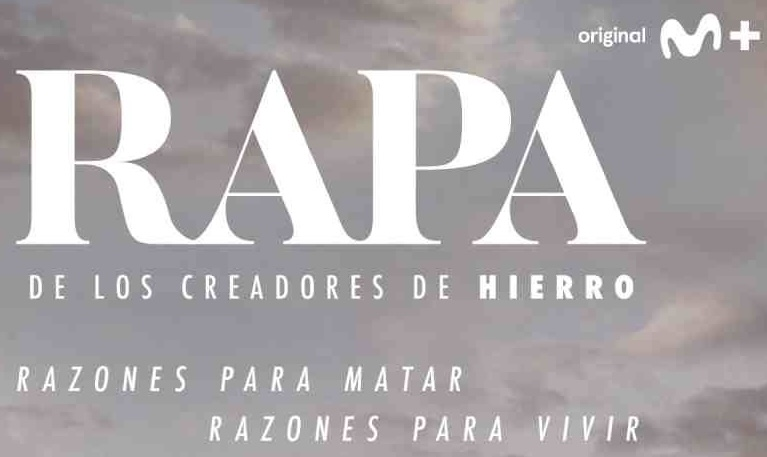
- Genre: Crime; Thriller
- Created by: Pepe Coira; Fran Araújo
- Written by: Pepe Coira; Fran Araújo
- Directed by: Jorge Coira
- Starring: Javier Cámara; Mónica López; Lucía Veiga; Eva Fernández; Toni Salgado; Ricardo de Barreiro; Berta Ojea; Jorge Bosch; Santi Prego; Paula Morado; Adrián Ríos; Iria Sobrado; Tito Asorey; Mabel Rivera; Víctor Mosqueira; Nacho Castaño; Lara Boedo; Xavier Estévez
- Composers: Xavi Font; Elba Fernández
- Country of origin: Spain
- Original language: Spanish
- No. of seasons: 3
- No. of episodes: 18

Production
- Production location: Galicia
- Running time: c. 50 min
- Production companies: Movistar Plus+; Portocabo

Original release
- Network: Movistar Plus+
- Release: 19 May 2022 – 10 October 2024

Rapa is a 2022 Spanish crime thriller television film series created by Pepe Coira and Fran Araújo and produced by Movistar Plus+ in collaboration with Portocabo. It stars Javier Cámara and Mónica López. It premiered on 19 May 2022. A second season premiered on 15 June 2023. The third and final season premiered on 12 September 2024.

== Premise ==
Amparo Seoane, Mayor of Cedeira, is murdered. Solving the crime becomes an obsession for Civil Guard sergeant Maite and local high school teacher Tomás, who was the only witness to the murder.

== Cast ==
- Javier Cámara as Tomás Hernández
- Mónica López as Maite Estévez
- Lucía Veiga as Norma Muiños Álvarez
- Eva Fernández as Dubra Varela Seoane
- Toni Salgado as Eliseo Bastida Seara
- Ricardo de Barreiro as Samuel Varela Seoane
- Berta Ojea as Balbina Álvarez
- Jorge Bosch as Segura
- Santi Prego as Ceide
- Paula Morado as Francisca "Paquita" Moure Cornide
- Adrián Ríos as Bolaño
- Iria Sobrado as Helena Beira
- Tito Asorey as Darío Cimadevila
- Mabel Rivera as Amparo Seoane
- Víctor Mosqueira as Roberto Jiménez Fernández
- Nacho Castaño as Matías Costenla
- Lara Boedo as Xana
- Xavier Estévez as Casal

== Accolades ==
Year	Award	Category	Nominee(s)	Result	Ref.
2022	28th Forqué Awards	Best TV Series		Nominated	
2022	28th Forqué Awards	Best Actor in a Series	Javier Cámara	Nominated	
2022	28th Forqué Awards	Best Actress in a Series	Mónica López	Won	
2023	10th Feroz Awards	Best Drama Series		Nominated	
2023	10th Feroz Awards	Best Actor in a Series	Javier Cámara	Nominated	
2023	10th Feroz Awards	Best Main Actress in a Series	Mónica López	Nominated	
2023	10th Feroz Awards	Best Supporting Actress in a Series	Lucía Veiga	Nominated	
2023	31st Actors and Actresses Union Awards	Best Television Actor in a Leading Role	Javier Cámara	Nominated	
2023	29th Forqué Awards	Best Actor in a TV Series	Javier Cámara	Nominated	
2024	25th Iris Awards	Best Fiction		Nominated	
2024	11th Feroz Awards	Best Drama Series		Nominated	
2024	11th Feroz Awards	Best Actor in a Series	Javier Cámara	Nominated	
2024	30th Forqué Awards	Best Actor in a Series	Javier Cámara	Pending	
