= Feroz Award for Best Comedy Film =

Annual Spanish film award

- Awarded for: Best Spanish Comedy Film
- Country: Spain
- Presented by: Asociación de Informadores Cinematográficos de España
- Currently held by: A House on Fire (2025)
- Website: http://www.feroz.es/

The Feroz Award for Best Comedy Film (Spanish: Premio Feroz a la mejor comedia) is one of the annual awards given at the Feroz Awards, presented by the Asociación de Informadores Cinematográficos de España.

It was first presented in 2014, with Javier Ruiz Caldera's film Three Many Weddings being the first recipient of the award.

== Winners and nominees ==
‡ - Goya Award for Best Film winner
† - Goya Award for Best Film nominee

=== 2010s ===
Year	English title	Original title	Director(s)
2014	Three Many Weddings	3 bodas de más	Javier Ruiz Caldera
2014	Witching and Bitching	Las brujas de Zugarramurdi	Álex de la Iglesia
2014	Family United †	La gran familia española	Daniel Sánchez Arévalo
2014	All the Women	Todas las mujeres	Mariano Barroso
2014	Living Is Easy with Eyes Closed ‡	Vivir es fácil con los ojos cerrados	David Trueba
2015	Carmina and Amen	Carmina y amén	Paco León
2015	Spanish Affair	Ocho apellidos vascos	Emilio Martínez-Lázaro
2015	Justi & Cía		Ignacio Estaregui
2015	Mortadelo and Filemon: Mission Implausible	Mortadelo y Filemón contra Jimmy el Cachondo	Javier Fesser
2015	The Unexpected Life	La vida inesperada	Jorge Torregrossa
2016	Negotiator	Negociador	Borja Cobeaga
2016	Spy Time	Anacleto: agente secreto	Javier Ruiz Caldera
2016	A Perfect Day †	Un día perfecto	Fernando León de Aranoa
2016	My Big Night	Mi gran noche	Álex de la Iglesia
2016	Requirements to Be a Normal Person	Requisitos para ser una persona normal	Leticia Dolera
2017	Kiki, Love to Love	Kiki, el amor se hace	Paco León
2017	María (and Everybody Else)	María (y los demás)	Nely Reguera
2017	The Night My Mother Killed My Father	La noche que mi madre mató a mi padre	Inés París
2017	The Open Door	La puerta abierta	Marina Seresesky
2017	The One-Eyed King	El rei borni	Marc Crehuet
2018	Holy Camp!	La llamada	Javier Ambrossi and Javier Calvo
2018	Abradacadabra		Pablo Berger
2018	Bomb Scared	Fe de etarras	Borja Cobeaga
2018	Muchos hijos, un mono y un castillo		Gustavo Salmerón
2018	Selfie		Víctor García León
2018	Anchor and Hope	Tierra firme	Carlos Marqués-Marcet
2019	Champions ‡	Campeones	Javier Fesser
2019	Almost 40	Casi 40	David Trueba
2019	Hopelessly Devout	Mi querida cofradía	Marta Díaz de Lope Díaz
2019	Superlópez		Javier Ruiz Caldera
2019	Some Time Later	Tiempo después	José Luis Cuerda

=== 2020s ===
Year	English title	Original title	Director(s)
2020	Advantages of Travelling by Train	Ventajas de viajar en tren	Aritz Moreno
2020	Seventeen	Diecisiete	Daniel Sánchez Arévalo
2020	The Incredible Shrinking Wknd	El increíble finde menguante	Jon Mikel Caballero
2020	Litus		Dani de la Orden
2020	I Can Quit Whenever I Want	Lo dejo cuando quiera	Carlos Therón
2021	Rosa's Wedding †	La boda de Rosa	Icíar Bollaín
2021	The Europeans	Los europeos	Víctor García León
2021	Unfortunate Stories	Historias lamentables	Javier Fesser
2021	Unknown Origins	Orígenes secretos	David Galán Galindo
2021	The People Upstairs †	Sentimental	Cesc Gay
2022	The Good Boss ‡	El buen patrón	Fernando León de Aranoa
2022	Girlfriends	Chavalas	Carol Rodríguez Colás
2022	The Cover	El cover	Secun de la Rosa
2022	The Odd-Job Men	Sis dies corrents	Neus Ballús
2022	An Optical Illusion	Un efecto óptico	Juan Cavestany
2023	Official Competition	Competencia oficial	Gastón Duprat and Mariano Cohn
2023	Four's a Crowd	El cuarto pasajero	Álex de la Iglesia
2023	You Have to Come and See It	Tenéis que venir a verla	Jonás Trueba
2023	Vasil		Avelina Prat
2023	Voy a pasármelo bien		David Serrano
2024	Robot Dreams		Pablo Berger
2024	Under Therapy	Bajo terapia	Gerardo Herrero
2024	The Girls Are Alright	Las chicas están bien	Itsaso Arana
2024	Mamacruz		Patricia Ortega
2024	Love & Revolution	Te estoy amando locamente	Alejandro Marín
2025	A House on Fire †	Casa en flames	Dani de la Orden
2025	Still Life with Ghosts	Bodegón con fantasmas	Enrique Buleo
2025	Idol Affair	Buscando a Coque	Teresa Bellón and César F. Calvillo
2025	Escape		Rodrigo Cortés
2025	The Other Way Around	Volveréis	Jonás Trueba
2026	The Dinner	La cena	Manuel Gómez Pereira
2026	Decorado		Alberto Vázquez
2026	My Friend Eva	Mi amiga Eva	Cesc Gay
2026	Band Together	Rondallas	Daniel Sánchez Arévalo
2026	Wolfgang	Wolfgang (extraordinari)	Javier Ruiz Caldera

== See also ==
- Goya Award for Best Film
