= Feroz Award for Best Comedy Series =

Annual Spanish television award

- Awarded for: Best Spanish comedy series
- Country: Spain
- Presented by: Asociación de Informadores Cinematográficos de España
- Currently held by: Celeste (2025)

The Feroz Award for Best Comedy Series (Spanish: Premio Feroz a la mejor serie de comedia) is one of the annual awards given at the Feroz Awards, presented by the Asociación de Informadores Cinematográficos de España. It was first presented in 2017, in that year, the Feroz Awards began presenting television categories, prior to that, only film categories were presented.

== Winners and nominees ==
=== 2010s ===
Year	English title	Original title	Network
2017	Paquita Salas		Flooxer
2017	¿Qué fue de Jorge Sanz? (5 años después)		Canal+
2017	Allí abajo		Antena 3
2017	Cites		TV3
2017	La que se avecina		Telecinco
2018	Vergüenza		Movistar+
2018	Allí abajo		Antena 3
2018	El fin de la comedia		Comedy Central
2019	Arde Madrid		Movistar+
2019	Paquita Salas		Netflix
2019	Vergüenza		Movistar+

=== 2020s ===
Year	English title	Original title	Recipient(s)	Network
2020	Perfect Life	Vida perfecta		Movistar+
2020	Vota Juan			TNT España
2020	Paquita Salas			Netflix
2021	Vamos Juan		Diego San José	TNT España
2021	Mira lo que has hecho		Berto Romero	Movistar+
2021	Nasdrovia		Sergio Sarria, Luismi Pérez and Miguel Esteban	Movistar+
2021	Vergüenza		Álvaro Fernández Armero and Juan Cavestany	Movistar+
2022	Venga Juan		Diego San José	HBO Max
2022	Queer You Are	Maricón perdido	Bob Pop	TNT España
2022	Reyes de la noche		Adolfo Valor and Cristóbal Garrido	Movistar+
2022	Perfect Life	Vida perfecta	Leticia Dolera	Movistar+
2023	I Don't Like Driving	No me gusta conducir	Jose Skaf, Guillermo Farré, Nahikari Ipiña and Borja Cobeaga	TNT España
2023	Autodefensa		Bernat Manzano, Montse Pujol Sola and Miguel Ángel Blanca	Filmin
2023	Simple	Fácil	Sandra Hermida, Anna R. Costa, Domingo Corral and Fran Araújo	Movistar Plus+
2023	The Girls at the Back	Las de la última fila	José Antonio Félez, Cristina Sutherland, Alberto Félez and Daniel Sánchez Arévalo	Netflix
2024	Poquita fe		Fran Araújo, Ignacio Corrales and Pepe Ripoll	Movistar Plus+
2024	Citas Barcelona		Pau Freixas, Eric Navarro, Laura Fernández and Oriol Sala-Patau	TV3 / Amazon Prime Video
2024	This Is Not Sweden	Això no és Suècia	Marta Baldó, Aina Clotet, Sergi Cameron and Marc Clotet	RTVE Play / TV3
2024	The Other Side	El otro lado	Fran Araújo, Susana Herreras, Xen Subirats and Laura Fernández Espeso	Movistar Plus+
2025	Celeste		Fran Araújo, Javier Méndez, Alejandro Flórez and Diego San José	Movistar Plus+
2025	Mamen Mayo		Adrián Guerra, Núria Valls, Miguel Ángel Faura and Edu Sola	SkyShowtime
2025	Death Inc.	Muertos S.L.	Susana Herreras and Alberto Caballero	Movistar Plus+
2025	Medina, el estafador de famosos		Jorge Ponce, Ricardo Castella, Lydia Cerrudo and Xen Subirats	Amazon Prime Video
