= Javier Ambrossi =

Spanish scriptwriter and actor

- Ambrossi in 2026
- Born: Francisco Javier García de la Camacha Gutiérrez-Ambrossi; 24 June 1984 (age 42); Madrid, Spain
- Education: Complutense University of Madrid
- Occupations: Producer; director; screenwriter; playwright; actor
- Years active: 2012–present
- Partner: Javier Calvo (2010–2025)
- Relatives: Macarena García (sister)

Francisco Javier García de la Camacha Gutiérrez-Ambrossi (born 24 June 1984), better known as Javier Ambrossi, is a Spanish writer, producer, director and actor. He is best known for forming a creative duo with Javier Calvo, with whom he wrote and directed the stage play La llamada and its film adaptation, as well as the television series Paquita Salas, Veneno and La mesías, and the film La bola negra (2026), for which they won the Cannes Film Festival Award for Best Director.

== Early life ==
Ambrossi was born in Madrid, the son of Francisco Javier García de la Camacha and wife Sofía Gutiérrez-Ambrossi. From a young age, he dreamed of being a writer. Ambrossi graduated with a degree in journalism from the Complutense University of Madrid and studied dramaturgy at the Real Escuela Superior de Arte Dramático. His younger sister, Macarena García, is also an actress.

== Career ==
Ambrossi's career as an aspiring actor began in the early 2000s, as he took on many bit roles. He had supporting roles in a number of national television series, including El comisario, Génesis: En la mente del asesino, Hermanos y detectivos, Amar en tiempos revueltos, Cuéntame cómo pasó, Maitena: Estados alterados, La fuga, and Arrayán. His best known roles were as Gustavo in the series Sin tetas no hay paraíso and as Cristiano in the series Ciega a citas. Ambrossi also acted in the film Sexykiller, morirás por ella and had the leading role in El triunfo. In the theater, he had parts in El enemigo de la clase and in Beaumarchais.

Since 2013, Ambrossi has co-directed La llamada at the Teatro Lara in Madrid, a musical he created alongside Javier Calvo. In August 2015, the Mexican production of La llamada opened at the López Tarso theatre in Mexico City with a Mexican cast. Los Javis co-directed the film adaptation of La llamada, Holy Camp!, which premiered in September 2017. It is centered around two teenage girls attending a rural Catholic summer camp.

In July 2016, the web television series Paquita Salas, created by Ambrossi and Calvo, premiered on Flooxer. The pair originally created the indie series as a way to hone their filmmaking skills, but due to its success, Netflix acquired the rights to air the second season of the series. There are currently three seasons with a fourth pending release. The comedy show is named for its mature female protagonist, who is a failing 50 year old showbiz agent and is played by Brays Efe. The mockumentary style of the series was very original in Spain, who doesn't have a tradition of short-form sitcoms.

Along with Calvo, Ambrossi was listed 47th in El Mundo's list of most important LGBT people in Spain in 2017. They have been credited with pioneering a new model of authorship for popular film in Spain, and in 2020 El País described them as "an unstoppable millennial revolution".

From October 2017 to February 2018, Ambrossi and Calvo appeared on the reality television talent competition show Operación Triunfo as the teachers of acting in the "Academy".

In 2020, Ambrossi and Calvo created the biographical television limited series Veneno, which aired on Atresplayer Premium and HBO Max. The series narrates the life of actress, celebrity, model, sex worker, and star, Cristina Ortiz, la Veneno, who was one of the first women to bring visibility to the trans community in Spain during the nineties and is based on Valeria Vegas's ¡Digo! Ni puta ni santa: Las memorias de la Veneno. When the first three episodes were released, they landed at the top of Spain's box office, and subscribers to Atresplayer increased by 42% with the show, which is watched ten times more than any other on the platform. The show was picked as one of Variety's best international series in 2020.

Veneno was the first project that Ambrossi and Calvo created under their own production company, Suma Latina Producciones. In 2021, they relaunched the company under the name Suma Content. The independent production company operating internationally and is based in Madrid. In an interview with Variety, Ambrossi explained, "At Suma Latina we were only able to do one production a year and we always had exclusive arrangements that limited what we could do. Suma Content was born for us to be free, no more exclusives."

Since 2020, Ambrossi has been a panelist for Mask Singer: Adivina quién canta, the Spanish version of the international music game show Masked Singer. On 1 March 2021, Ambrossi was announced as a judge for Drag Race España, the Spanish version of the television drag queen competition Drag Race.

In 2023, the family thriller television series La mesías, created, written and directed by Ambrossi and Calvo for Movistar Plus+, was included out of competition in the official section of the 71st San Sebastián International Film Festival. Centered around the life of a man named Enric, who carries religious childhood trauma, the series is about how he is impacted by the viral video of a Christian pop music group, and it has been described as their most ambitious and complex project to date.

Ambrossi and Calvo also created the drama television series Vestidas de azul for Atresplayer Premium, a spin-off and continuation for Veneno in 2023. The show begins two years after Veneno when Valeria returns to Valencia and discovers a VHS copy of Antonio Giménez Rico's famous documentary Vestida de azul and looks to uncover what has happened to the six transgender women it features. "With the series, we’d like to convert the documentary’s protagonists into a mainstream phenomenon, giving them what they didn’t have in the past: Fame but also respect and affection," Ambrossi has explained.

In February 2024, Ambrossi co-hosted the 38th Goya Awards, alongside Calvo and actress and singer Ana Belén.

On the whole, Ambrossi, along with Calvo, is bringing greater visibility to the LGBTQ+ community and related themes via his work in the mainstream media industry. Their work has been described as "representative of a Spanish queer aesthetics which navigates between combative subversion and mainstream normalization" and as "changing hegemonic social and ideological constructs in relation to gender, sexuality, and identity".

== Personal life ==
In 2012, Ambrossi started a relationship with actor and director Javier Calvo. Together, the two are universally known as "los Javis" and have become public figures with active social media followings. They spontaneously proposed to each other at the Capitol Cinema in Madrid during the premiere event for one of their films. Both of them have the phrase "Lo hacemos y ya vemos", which translates to "we'll do it and we'll see" and is the title of a song from La llamada, tattooed on their forearms. In November 2025, the couple announced their separation after 13 years together.

== Filmography ==
Acting
Year	Title	Role	Notes
2001	Cuéntame cómo pasó	Richi	6 episodes
2001	Operación triunfo	Coach	35 episodes
2006	El triunfo	Topo	
2006	El hormiguero	Self-Guest	2 episodes
2008	Sexy Killer: You'll Die for Her	Jaime	
2011	The Bird Spider	Pet shop salesman	
2014	Planeta Calleja	Self	1 episode
2018	La resistencia	Invitado	1 episode
2018	Looser	Self	6 episodes
2019	Terror y feria	Javier Ambrossi	1 episode
2020	Mask Singer: Adivina quién canta	Investigator	25 episodes
2020	Física o Química: El Reencuentro	Self	1 episode
2021	Drag Race España	Jurado	34 episodes
2021	B.S.O. con Emilio Aragón	Invitado	1 episode
2021	Family Feud: The Battle of the Famous	Contestant	1 episode
2023	José Mota Live Show		1 episode
2024	Drag Race España: All Stars	Jurado	1 episode

Creator
Year	Title
2016–present	Paquita Salas
2020	Veneno
2020	Paca la Piraña, ¿dígame?
2023	La mesías
2023	Vestidas de Azul

Directing
Year	Title	Notes
2016–present	Paquita Salas	16 episodes
2017	Holy Camp!	
2020	Más de Veneno: El Documental	
2020	Veneno	5 episodes
2023	La mesías	
2026	La bola negra	

Producing
Year	Title	Role	Notes
2017	Holy Camp!	Executive producer	
2019	Terror y feria	Producer	6 episodes
2020	Veneno	Executive producer	8 episodes
2021	Cardo	Executive producer	6 episodes
2021	Una Navidad con Samantha Hudson	Producer	
2023	La mesías	Producer	7 episodes
2025	Superstar	Producer	
2026	La bola negra	Producer	

Writing
Year	Title	Notes
2016	Paquita Salas	15 episodes
2017	Holy Camp!	
2020	Veneno	5 episodes
2023	La mesías	6 episodes
2026	La bola negra	

== Awards and nominations ==
Award	Year	Category	Work	Result	Ref.
Cannes Film Festival	2026	Best Director	La bola negra	Won (Note: Tied with Paweł Pawlikowski for Fatherland)	
CEC Awards	2018	Best Adapted Screenplay	Holy Camp!	Nominated	
CEC Awards	2018	Best New Director	Holy Camp!	Nominated	
Feroz Awards	2017	Best Comedy Series	Paquita Salas	Won	
Feroz Awards	2018	Best Comedy Film	Holy Camp!	Won	
Feroz Awards	2019	Best Comedy Series	Paquita Salas	Nominated	
Feroz Awards	2020	Best Comedy Series	Paquita Salas	Nominated	
Feroz Awards	2021	Best Drama Series	Veneno	Nominated	
Feroz Awards	2024	Best Drama Series	La mesías	Won	
Feroz Awards	2024	Best Screenplay in a Series	La mesías	Won	
Feroz Awards	2026	Best Comedy Series	Superstar	Nominated	
Fotogramas de Plata	2018	Best Spanish Film	Holy Camp!	Won	
Fotogramas de Plata	2020	Best Spanish Series	Veneno	Won	
Gaudí Awards	2018	Best Non-Catalan Language Film	Holy Camp!	Nominated	
Gaudí Awards	2018	Audience Award	Holy Camp!	Won	
Goya Awards	2018	Best Adapted Screenplay	Holy Camp!	Nominated	
Goya Awards	2018	Best New Director	Holy Camp!	Nominated	
Iris Awards	2019	Best Screenplay	Paquita Salas	Nominated	
Iris Awards	2019	Best Director	Paquita Salas	Nominated	
Iris Awards	2020	Best Director	Veneno	Won	
Iris Awards	2020	Critics' Award	Veneno	Won	
Iris Awards	2025	Best Screenplay – Fiction	La mesías	Won	
Iris Awards	2025	Best Direction – Fiction	La mesías	Won	
Iris Awards	2025	Best Production – Fiction	La mesías	Nominated	
Málaga Film Festival	2022	Málaga Talent Award	—N/a	Honored	
Series Mania	2024	Best Directing	La mesías	Won	
