= Cardo (TV series) =

Spanish television series

- Genre: Drama
- Created by: Ana Rujas; Claudia Costafreda
- Directed by: Claudia Costafreda
- Starring: Ana Rujas; Clara Sans; Ana Telenti; Juani Ruiz; Alberto San Juan; Diego Ibáñez; Yolanda Ramos
- Country of origin: Spain
- Original language: Spanish
- No. of seasons: 2
- No. of episodes: 8

Production
- Executive producers: Montse García; Sonia Martínez; Amparo Miralles; Javier Calvo; Javier Ambrossi
- Production companies: Atresmedia Televisión; Buendía Estudios; Suma Latina

Original release
- Network: ATRESplayer Premium
- Release: 7 November – 5 December 2021

Cardo is a Spanish television series created by Ana Rujas and Claudia Costafreda for Atresmedia Televisión. It was produced by Atresmedia Televisión in collaboration with Buendía Estudios and Suma Latina. It premiered on Atresplayer Premium on 7 November 2021.

== Premise ==
The fiction, primarily set in Carabanchel, consists of a story displaying "costumbrista" themes, also underpinning an outline of the conditions of the urban precariat. It follows María, a woman close to the 30s hooked on drugs and toxic relationships. She has decided to help Puri, a 65-year-old woman whose floristry shop is about to close down. María then suffers a motorbike accident.

== Cast ==
- Ana Rujas as María.
- Clara Sans as Bego
- Ana Telenti as Eva.
- Juani Ruiz as Puri.
- Alberto San Juan as Santiago.
- Diego Ibáñez as Gabriel.
- Yolanda Ramos as Fausta.

== Production and release ==
Based on an original idea by Ana Rujas, Cardo (lit. 'Thistle') was created by Rujas together with Claudia Costafreda. It was produced by Atresmedia Televisión in collaboration with Buendía Estudios and Suma Latina. Montse García, Sonia Martínez, Amparo Miralles and Javier Calvo and Javier Ambrossi ("Los Javis") were credited as executive producers. Consisting of 6 episodes, the series was directed by Claudia Costafreda. Shooting began in June 2021 and it took place in Madrid.

The series was presented on 24 September 2021 at the 69th San Sebastián International Film Festival, with the pre-screening of the first three episodes. It was slated for a 7 November 2021 premiere date.

In December 2021, Atresmedia reported the renovation of the series for a second season. Season 2's episodes 1 and 2 premiered on 12 February 2023.

No.	Title	Directed by	Original release date
1	"Capítulo 1"	Claudia Costafreda	7 November 2021
2	"Capítulo 2"	Claudia Costafreda	7 November 2021
3	"Capítulo 3"	Claudia Costafreda	14 November 2021
4	"Capítulo 4"	Lluís Sellarès	21 November 2021
5	"Capítulo 5"	Claudia Costafreda	28 November 2021
6	"Capítulo 6"	Claudia Costafreda	5 December 2021

== Accolades ==
Year	Award	Category	Nominee(s)	Result	Ref.
2022	9th Feroz Awards	Best Drama Series		Won	
2022	9th Feroz Awards	Best Actress (TV series)	Ana Rujas	Won	
2022	9th Feroz Awards	Best Supporting Actress (TV series)	Yolanda Ramos	Nominated	
2023	31st Actors and Actresses Union Awards	Best Television Actress in a Leading Role	Ana Rujas	Nominated	
