= A Son (2025 film) =

- Theatrical release poster
- Spanish: Un hijo
- Directed by: Nacho La Casa
- Screenplay by: Juan R. Apolo; Nacho La Casa
- Based on: Un hijo by Alejandro Palomas
- Starring: Hugo Silva; Macarena García; Ian Cortegoso
- Cinematography: Santiago Racaj
- Edited by: Ana Álvarez-Ossorio
- Music by: Zeltia Montes
- Production companies: Capitán Araña; Guion Alto; Veleta Films AIE
- Distributed by: Filmax
- Release dates: 15 November 2025 (Cairo); 8 May 2026 (Spain)
- Country: Spain
- Language: Spanish

A Son (Spanish: Un hijo) is a 2025 Spanish drama film directed by Nacho La Casa based on the novel by Alejandro Palomas. It stars Hugo Silva, Macarena García, and newcomer Ian Cortegoso.

== Plot ==
Inexperienced school psychologist María tries to crack the meaning behind the drawings of suspiciously happy 8-year-old boy Guille, aggressive reluctance from Guille's father notwithstanding.

== Cast ==
- Ian Cortegoso as Guille
- Hugo Silva as Manuel
- Jesús Carroza as Roberto
- Macarena García as María

== Production ==
The film is based on the book of the same name by Alejandro Palomas. It was produced by Capitán Araña, Guion Alto, and Veleta Films AIE, and it had the participation of RTVE, Movistar Plus+, and Canal Sur plus backing from Junta de Andalucía, the Madrid regional administration, Diputación Foral de Álava and Creative Europe MEDIA, and funding from ICO.

Shooting locations included Seville and Vitoria-Gasteiz.

== Release ==
A Son world premiered at the 46th Cairo International Film Festival on 15 November 2025.

Filmax is scheduled to release theatrically the film in Spain on 8 May 2026. Filmax also acquired world sales rights.

== Reception ==
In a 1½-star rating, Sergi Sánchez of La Razón decried the "deceptive and manipulative" final third of the film as an "infamy".

Salvador Llopart of La Vanguardia rated the film 4 out of 5 stars, deeming it to be "sensitive and not at all manipulative, [plus] directed with a steady hand" citing the entire cast to be "superb", specially Hugo Silva.

Manu Yáñez of Fotogramas rated A Son 3 out of 5 stars, citing "the fairy-tale atmosphere that pervades the entire film" as the best thing about it, while mentioning the mushy undertones of the third act as the worst thing about it.

Manuel J. Lombardo of Diario de Sevilla gave the film a 1-star rating, lamenting that there is no magic trick able to "rescue the film from the many problems, pitfalls and inconsistencies it is plagued by since its beginning".

== See also ==
- List of Spanish films of 2026
