= Gracia Olayo =

Spanish actress (born 1957)

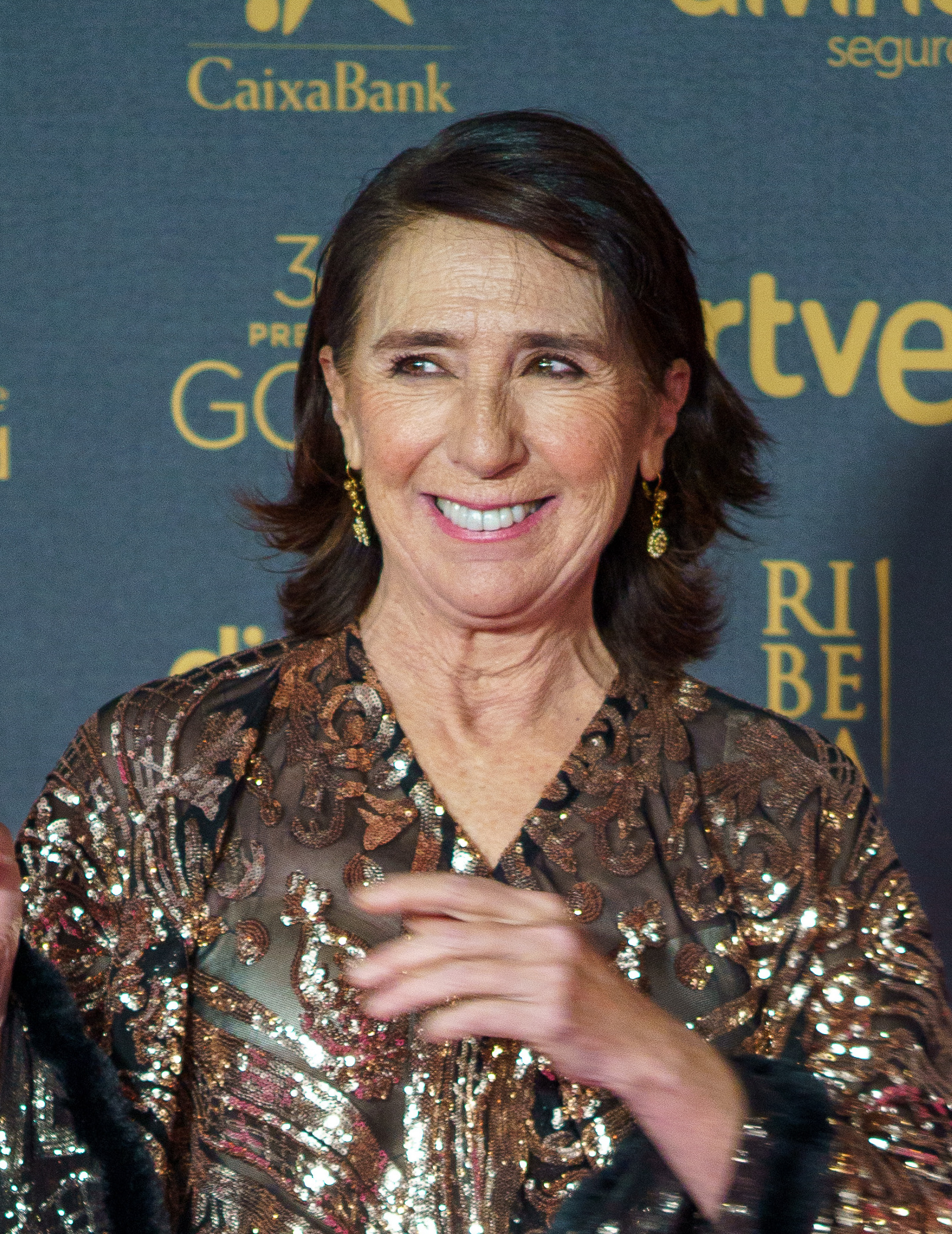
- Olayo in 2024
- Born: 19 August 1957 (age 67); Madrid, Spain
- Occupation: Actress

Gracia Olayo (born 19 August 1957) is a Spanish stage, television and film actress.

== Biography ==
Gracia Olayo was born in Madrid on 19 August 1957, into a family of 19 siblings. She has another twin sister, Sole Olayo, also an actress. She worked for 11 years (until age 30) as a flight attendant. In 1988, she founded the comedy trio Las Veneno, which became a duo (consisting of Gracia and her twin Sole) in the 1990s. By 1999, she was working in Antena 3's show Sorpresa ¡Sorpresa! as a steward.

Some early film credits in her acting career include performance in Historias de la puta mili (1994), El efecto mariposa (1995), Perdona bonita, pero Lucas me quería a mí (1997), 800 Bullets (2002), Bulgarian Lovers (2004) and The Ferpect Crime (2004).

Her character of Rosa Ruano (providing comic relief) in fantasy television series Los protegidos from 2010 to 2012 became popular, providing Olayo a platform to reach to younger audiences, going on to perform for 4 years in Los Javis' (Javier Calvo and Javier Ambrossi) stage play La llamada, in replacement of Llum Barrera. She also reprise her role of Sor Bernarda in the film adaptation of the stage play, La llamada (known under the English-language title Holy Camp!) which was also directed by Los Javis. In 2018 she featured alongside Pedro Casablanc as (foster) parents of the title character of superhero comedy Superlópez. Olayo joined the second season of another superhero comedy work, the series The Neighbor, to portray the Mayor of Madrid, obsessed with bringing a Summer Olympics to the city.

== Filmography ==
=== Film ===
Year	Title	Role	Notes	Ref.
2002	800 balas (800 Bullets)	Juli		
2004	Los novios búlgaros (Bulgarian Lovers)	Rosita		
2004	Crimen ferpecto (The Ferpect Crime)	Concha		
2010	Balada triste de trompeta (The Last Circus)	Sonsoles		
2014	Musarañas (Shrew's Nest)	Doña Puri		
2017	La llamada (Holy Camp!)	Sor Bernarda		
2018	Superlópez			
2020	Hasta que la boda nos separe (The Wedding Unplanner)	Lourdes		
2020	Las mejores familias (The Best Families)	Carmen		
TBD	Fenómenas	Paz		

=== Television ===
Year	Title	Role	Notes	Ref.
2006	Mujeres	Susana	Main	
2008	Plutón B.R.B. Nero	Merche	Main	
2010–12	Los protegidos	Rosa Ruano	Main	
2013	Con el culo al aire	Mamen		
2016	La sonata del silencio (The Sonata of Silence)	Juana		
2021	El Vecino (The Neighbor)	Alcaldesa de Madrid	Introduced in season 2	
2021	Los protegidos: El regreso	Rosa Ruano	Reprise of role in Los protegidos	
2021	Supernormal	Marisol		
2023	La mesías	Tía Rosa ('Aunt Rosa')		

== Accolades ==
Year	Award	Category	Work	Result	Ref.
2007	16th Actors and Actresses Union Awards	Best Television Actress in a Minor Role	Mujeres	Won	
2016	25th Actors and Actresses Union Awards	Best Stage Actress in a Secondary Role	La llamada	Nominated	
2018	5th Feroz Awards	Best Supporting Actress in a Film	Holy Camp!	Nominated	
2018	27th Actors and Actresses Union Awards	Best Film Actress in a Secondary Role	Holy Camp!	Nominated	
2024	32nd Actors and Actresses Union Awards	Best Television Actress in a Minor Role	La mesías	Won	
