= Despite Everything =

2019 film by Gabriela Tagliavini

- Release poster
- Spanish: A pesar de todo
- Directed by: Gabriela Tagliavini
- Screenplay by: Eric Charles Wilkinson; Eugene Rhee; Helen Rhee; Teresa Fernández-Valdés; Gabriela Tagliavini
- Story by: Eric Charles Wilkinson; Eugene Rhee; Helen Rhee
- Produced by: Eugene Rhee; Helen Rhee; Eric Charles Wilkinson; Teresa Fernández-Valdés; Ramón Campos
- Starring: Blanca Suárez; Macarena García; Amaia Salamanca; Belén Cuesta
- Cinematography: Kiko de la Rica
- Edited by: José Manuel Jiménez
- Music by: Joaquim Badia
- Production companies: Bambú Producciones; Cinephile Pictures
- Distributed by: Netflix
- Release dates: 16 March 2019 (Málaga); 3 May 2019 (Netflix)
- Running time: 78 minutes
- Country: Spain
- Language: Spanish

Despite Everything (Spanish: A pesar de todo) is a 2019 Spanish comedy film directed by Gabriela Tagliavini and starring Blanca Suárez, Macarena García, Amaia Salamanca, and Belén Cuesta . The film premiered at the Málaga Film Festival on 16 March 2019, and released on Netflix on 3 May 2019, becoming the most-watched Spanish Netflix original film of that year.

== Plot ==
Before the reading of their mother's will, four estranged sisters find out that the man they've known as their father is not and each one has a different father. Their mother, Carmen, left a video testament in which she reveals her secret, and as a last wish and condition of receiving their inheritance tells her daughters to find their biological fathers, providing only the names of her former lovers. However, if one of them chooses not to do so, the inheritance is forfeited for all.

The siblings live separate lives and are opposites of each other. Sara is an accomplished magazine editor in New York City; Lucia, the youngest, is a discontented nonconformist engaging in sexual escapades; Sofía is an artist and lesbian with commitment issues; and Claudia is conservative, hiding that her husband left her and coping with it by popping pills and drinking wine excessively. Compelled to tolerate each other, the four embark on a road trip to procure DNA samples of the men, discover their fathers, and claim their inheritance.

== Cast ==
- Blanca Suárez as Sara
- Macarena García as Lucia
- Amaia Salamanca as Sofía
- Belén Cuesta as Claudia
- Maxi Iglesias as Alejandro
- Juan Diego as Pedro Domínguez
- Tito Valverde as Victor
- Emilio Gutiérrez Caba as Padre Díaz
- Carlos Bardem as Pablo
- Joaquín Climent as Notario
- Teresa Rabal as Madre Alejandro
- Rossy de Palma as Inés
- Marisa Paredes as Carmen
