= Holy Camp! =

- Theatrical release poster
- Spanish: La llamada
- Directed by: Javier Ambrossi; Javier Calvo
- Screenplay by: Javier Ambrossi; Javier Calvo
- Based on: La llamada by: Javier Ambrossi; Javier Calvo
- Produced by: Enrique López Lavigne
- Starring: Macarena García; Anna Castillo; Belén Cuesta; Gracia Olayo; Richard Collins-Moore
- Cinematography: Migue Amoedo
- Edited by: Marta Velasco
- Music by: Leiva
- Production companies: Apache Films; Sábado Películas; Lo hacemos y ya vemos AIE
- Distributed by: DeAPlaneta
- Release dates: 26 September 2017 (Cines Capitol); 29 September 2017 (Spain)
- Running time: 108 minutes
- Country: Spain
- Languages: Spanish; English
- Box office: €2.7 million

Holy Camp! (Spanish: La llamada, lit. 'The Call') is a 2017 Spanish musical comedy film directed by Javier Ambrossi and Javier Calvo in their debut feature. It is the film adaptation of the musical play La llamada, which was also written and directed by Ambrossi and Calvo and ran for several seasons at Teatro Lara. Its cast is toplined by Macarena García, Anna Castillo, Belén Cuesta, and Gracia Olayo.

== Plot ==
Sister Milagros and Mother Bernarda are two nuns in charge at the Catholic summer camp La Brújula in Segovia. Mother Bernarda is seeking to modernize and reach out to youth through music, while Sister Milagros is full of self doubt.

The main characters are María and Susana, two 17-year-old girls who are spending the summer at the camp which they have attended since they were little. They both love reggaeton and "Electro Latino" music; but God's apparitions to and calling of María begin to change all their lives.

== Cast ==
- Macarena García as María Casado
- Anna Castillo as Susana Romero
- Belén Cuesta as Hermana Milagros
- Gracia Olayo as Madre Bernarda de los Arcos
- Richard Collins-Moore as Dios ('God')
- María Isabel Díaz as Janice
- Secun de la Rosa as Carlos
- Esty Quesada as Marta
- Víctor Elías as Joseba
- Llum Barrera as Monja (Nun)
- Henry Méndez as himself

== Production ==
Adapted from the stage play La llamada, Calvo stated that the work stemmed from his wish to tell a "Lesbian love story set in a Christian camp".

The film was produced by Apache Films, Sábado Películas and Lo hacemos y ya vemos AIE and it had the participation of TVE and TV3.

The 'Alto del León' camp in the province of Segovia served to portray the fictional Christian 'Campamento La Brújula'.

== Release ==
The film had its premiere on 26 September 2017 at the Cines Capitol in Madrid. It was also presented at the 65th San Sebastián International Film Festival on 28 September 2017 ahead of its 29 September 2017 rollout in Spanish theatres under DeAPlaneta. In its opening weekend in 219 screens, it grossed €0.49 million (73,000 admissions), obtaining the best takings per screen ratio in the Spanish box office. It went on to gross €2.7 million (483,238 admissions) throughout its theatrical window.

For its North-American premiere, it was programmed at the 29th Palm Springs International Film Festival.

== Reception ==
Jordi Costa of El País assessed that the "fortunate" location of the camp "amplifies" the power of the source material, with the film also featuring new and "very appropriate" characters, "innovative solutions", and an "impeccable" cast.

Jonathan Holland of The Hollywood Reporter commended the film as a "lively and touching debut".

== Accolades ==
Year	Award	Category	Nominee(s)	Result	Ref.
2018	23rd Forqué Awards	Best Actress	Anna Castillo	Nominated	
2018	5th Feroz Awards	Best Comedy Film		Won	
2018	5th Feroz Awards	Best Supporting Actress in a Film	Anna Castillo	Nominated	
2018	5th Feroz Awards	Best Supporting Actress in a Film	Belén Cuesta	Nominated	
2018	5th Feroz Awards	Best Supporting Actress in a Film	Gracia Olayo	Nominated	
2018	5th Feroz Awards	Best Trailer	Alberto Gutiérrez	Won	
2018	5th Feroz Awards	Best Film Poster		Nominated	
2018	10th Gaudí Awards	Best Non-Catalan Language Film		Nominated	
2018	10th Gaudí Awards	Best Supporting Actress	Anna Castillo	Nominated	
2018	10th Gaudí Awards	Best Original Score	Leiva	Nominated	
2018	10th Gaudí Awards	Special Audience Award		Won	
2018	32nd Goya Awards	Best New Director	Javier Ambrossi, Javier Calvo	Nominated	
2018	32nd Goya Awards	Best Adapted Screenplay	Javier Ambrossi, Javier Calvo	Nominated	
2018	32nd Goya Awards	Best Supporting Actress	Anna Castillo	Nominated	
2018	32nd Goya Awards	Best Supporting Actress	Belén Cuesta	Nominated	
2018	32nd Goya Awards	Best Original Song	"La llamada" by Leiva	Won	
2018	27th Actors and Actresses Union Awards	Best Film Actress in a Secondary Role	Belén Cuesta	Nominated	
2018	27th Actors and Actresses Union Awards	Best Film Actress in a Secondary Role	Gracia Olayo	Nominated	
2018	27th Actors and Actresses Union Awards	Best Film Actor in a Minor Role	Secun de la Rosa	Nominated	
2018	5th Platino Awards	Best First Feature Film		Nominated	

== See also ==
- List of Spanish films of 2017
