= Advantages of Travelling by Train =

2019 film directed by Aritz Moreno

- Poster
- Spanish: Ventajas de viajar en tren
- Directed by: Aritz Moreno
- Written by: Javier Gullón
- Based on: Ventajas de viajar en tren by Antonio Orejudo
- Produced by: Leire Apellaniz; Juan Gordon; Merry Colomer
- Starring: Luis Tosar; Pilar Castro; Ernesto Alterio; Quim Gutiérrez; Belén Cuesta; Macarena García; Javier Godino; Stéphanie Magnin; Gilbert Melki; Javier Botet
- Cinematography: Javier Agirre
- Edited by: Raúl López
- Music by: Cristobal Tapia de Veer
- Production companies: Morena Films; Señor y Señora; Logical Pictures; Ventajas de Viajar en Tren AIE
- Distributed by: Filmax
- Release dates: October 2019 (Sitges); 8 November 2019 (Spain)
- Running time: 102 minutes
- Countries: Spain; France
- Language: Spanish

Advantages of Travelling by Train (Spanish: Ventajas de viajar en tren) is a 2019 black comedy film directed by Aritz Moreno in his feature length directorial debut and written by Javier Gullón. The film is based on the novel Ventajas de viajar en tren by Antonio Orejudo and stars Luis Tosar, Pilar Castro, and Ernesto Alterio, among others. The plot concerns a series of tales within tales triggered by a conversation on a train.

The film received four nominations at the 34th Goya Awards including Best New Director and won the Feroz Award for Best Comedy Film.

== Plot ==
After arriving home to find her husband completely crazy, young literary editor Helga Pato is forced to put him into a psychiatric clinic in the north of the country. On the return train journey, a stranger, to help pass the time, suddenly asks her: “Would you like me to tell you about my life?”

He is Ángel Sanagustín, a psychiatrist who is investigating the story of the worst clinical case he has ever come across, that of Martín Urales de Úbeda, a paranoid. From the account of Martín sister's Amelia, Ángel develops the story of Martín (rejected and been thrown a croquette by his father), who served as a fighter pilot in Kosovo, where he began a relationship with Dr. Linares, a cooperator working in a local hospital for kids, and who uneasily became a female escort involved via one of her clients (Cristóbal de la Hoz) in a heinous plot pertaining child sexual abuse, child pornography, and organ trade.

It is only then revealed that Martín is not a fighter pilot and he was not in Kosovo, but he is a former garbage man working in San Javier, Murcia who lost his arm during a bad working night, and later became utterly paranoid about fellow garbage collectors' true intentions. Furthermore, upon the story of Ángel's visit to Urales de Úbeda's family house near Las Ventas, Amelia is revealed to be Martín, who had otherwise gathered years of undisposed garbage in the basement.

After finishing Martín's story, Ángel gets off the train stop to buy provisions and invite Helga, leaving behind a red file full of stories, as the train starts again without waiting for him. Then the fiction develops Helga's backstory, starting with her disenchantment from a relationship with a best selling author and then her ensuing relationship with Emilio, a stand owner in Retiro Park with whom she begins a new romance upon meeting with their pet dogs, spiralling into an abusive relationship as Emilio gradually submits Helga to behaving like another dog. Upon reaching her lowest point and fantasizing with killing Emilio with a hammer and feeding his brain to the dogs, Helga decides to kill him via poisoning. Yet rather than killing him, the supplied drug turns Emilio into a feces-gazing near-catatonic state, leading her to admit him to a psychiatric clinic.

Helga is fascinated by the stories in the red file. Another story is that of the failed romance in Paris between Gárate (a man born with severe flaws in his skeleton with deluded expectations about relationships, women and, broadly construed, life in general) and Rosa (a woman with one leg shorter than the other one). Helga decides to try to publish the red file, and so she begins a search for Ángel, going to the latter's purported house in Galapagar, where she is told that Ángel is not a psychiatrist but a man suffering from a condition of personality disorder. Upon visiting the house in Las Ventas, Helga meets with Ángel in the garbage-ridden basement, which explodes in a seemingly spontaneous combustion. After surviving the incident and being seen giving consent to a neurosurgical intervention, Helga takes another train, meeting with a man looking like Martín.

== Cast ==
- Pilar Castro as Helga Pato
- Ernesto Alterio as Ángel Sanagustín
- Quim Gutiérrez as Emilio
- Luis Tosar as Martín Urales de Úbeda
- Belén Cuesta as Amelia Urales de Úbeda
- Macarena García as Rosa
- Javier Godino as Cristóbal de la Hoz
- Stéphanie Magnin as Doctora Linares
- Gilbert Melki as Leandro
- Javier Botet as Gárate
- Ramón Barea as Martín's father
- Alberto San Juan as W

== Production ==
Penned by Javier Gullón, the screenplay adapts the novel by Antonio Orejudo. A Spanish-French co-production, the film was produced by Morena Films and Señor y Señora alongside Logical Pictures and Ventajas de Viajar en Tren AIE, and it had the participation of ETB, and Movistar+, and support from ICAA and the Basque Government. It was shot in Madrid, Gipuzkoa and Paris. Shooting began on 10 December 2018.

== Release ==
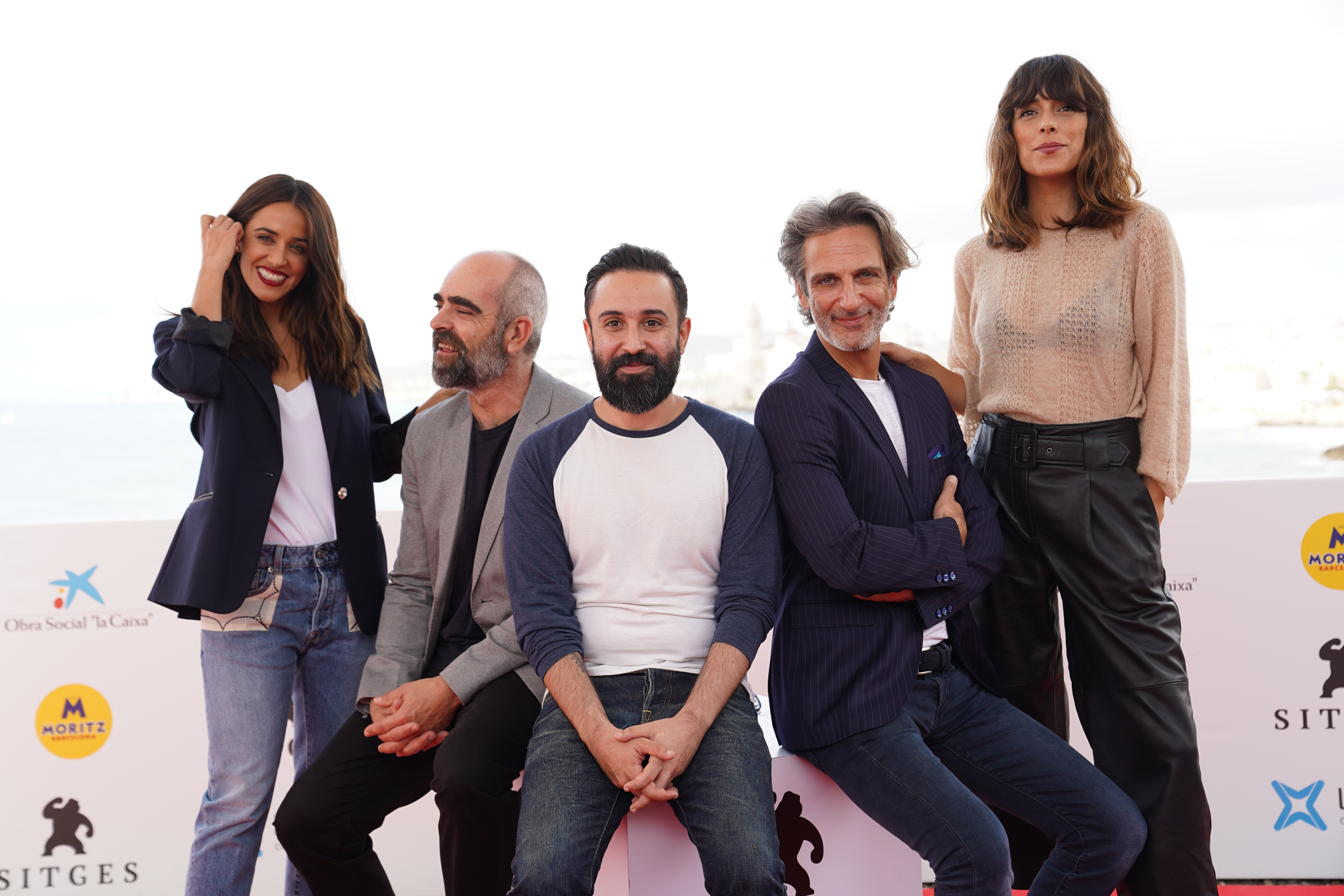
Macarena García, Luis Tosar, Aritz Moreno, Ernesto Alterio, and Belén Cuesta during the presentation of the film at the 2019 Sitges Film Festival

The film premiered in the Official Fantàstic Competition at the 52nd Sitges Film Festival in October 2019. Distributed by Filmax, it was released in cinemas in Spain on 8 November 2019.

== Reception ==
On review aggregator website Rotten Tomatoes, the film holds an approval rating of 100% based on six reviews, with an average rating of 7.5/10. Ricardo Rosado for the Spanish magazine Fotogramas gave the film three out of five stars calling the movie "brave and free", writing that "the movie can celebrate its own insanity unlike any other". Mikel Zorrilla from Espinof gave the film four out of five stars calling the film "a daring debut film that never ceases to surprise". Rubén Romero Santos of Cinemanía rated the film 3 1/2 out of 5 stars, deeming it to be "the most daring Spanish film of 2019" as well as susceptible of "hurting sensitivities".

== Accolades ==
Year	Award	Category	Nominee(s)	Result	Ref.
2019	75th CEC Medals	Best Actress	Pilar Castro	Nominated	
2019	75th CEC Medals	Best Adapted Screenplay	Javier Gullón	Nominated	
2019	25th Forqué Awards	Best Actress	Pilar Castro	Nominated	
2019	34th Goya Awards	Best New Director	Aritz Moreno	Nominated	
2019	34th Goya Awards	Best Adapted Screenplay	Javier Gullón	Nominated	
2019	34th Goya Awards	Best Art Direction	Mikel Serrano	Nominated	
2019	34th Goya Awards	Best Makeup and Hairstyles	Karmele Soler and Olga Cruz	Nominated	
2020	7th Feroz Awards	Best Comedy Film	Advantages of Travelling by Train	Won	
2020	7th Feroz Awards	Best Director	Aritz Moreno	Nominated	
2020	7th Feroz Awards	Best Screenplay	Javier Gullón	Nominated	
2020	7th Feroz Awards	Best Main Actress	Pilar Castro	Nominated	
2020	7th Feroz Awards	Best Supporting Actor	Quim Gutiérrez	Nominated	
2020	7th Feroz Awards	Best Original Soundtrack	Cristobal Tapia de Veer	Nominated	
2020	7th Feroz Awards	Best Film Poster	Advantages of Travelling by Train	Nominated	
2020	33rd European Film Awards	Best Comedy	Advantages of Travelling by Train	Nominated	
2020	7th Platino Awards	Best First Feature Film	Advantages of Travelling by Train	Nominated	

== See also ==
- List of Spanish films of 2019
