= 5th Feroz Awards =

2018 Spanish cinematography awards by the AICE

- Date: January 22, 2018
- Site: Polideportivo Antonio Magariños, Madrid
- Hosted by: Julián López
- Organized by: Asociación de Informadores Cinematográficos de España

Highlights
- Best Picture: Summer 1993 (Drama); Holy Camp! (Comedy)
- Best Direction: Carla Simón; Summer 1993
- Best Actor: Javier Gutiérrez; The Motive
- Best Actress: Nathalie Poza; Can't Say Goodbye
- Most awards: Summer 1993 (4)
- Most nominations: The Motive (8)

Television coverage
- Network: #0

The 5th award ceremony of the Feroz Awards was held at Polideportivo Antonio Magariños, in Madrid, on January 22, 2018. It was hosted by Julián López and aired on #0.

== Winners and nominees ==
The nominees were announced on December 5, 2017. The ceremony, held at the Polideportivo Antonio Magariños in Madrid, was presented by Julián López.

=== Film ===
Best Drama Film: Summer 1993; The Motive; Giant; Can't Say Goodbye; Veronica	Best Comedy Film: Holy Camp!; Abracadabra; Bomb Scared; Muchos hijos, un mono y un castillo; Selfie; Anchor and Hope
Best Director: Carla Simón — Summer 1993; Aitor Arregi & Jon Garaño — Giant; Isabel Coixet — The Bookshop; Manuel Martín Cuenca — The Motive; Paco Plaza — Veronica	Best Screenplay: Carla Simón — Summer 1993; Alejandro Hernández & Manuel Martín Cuenca — The Motive; Diego San José — Bomb Scared; Pablo Remón — Can't Say Goodbye; Fernando Navarro & Paco Plaza — Veronica
Best Main Actor: Javier Gutiérrez — The Motive; Santiago Alverú — Selfie; Javier Cámara — Bomb Scared; Andrés Gertrúdix — Dying; Antonio de la Torre — Abracadabra	Best Main Actress: Nathalie Poza — Can't Say Goodbye; Marián Álvarez — Dying; Laia Artigas — Summer 1993; Sandra Escacena — Veronica; Núria Prims — Uncertain Glory; Maribel Verdú — Abracadabra
Best Supporting Actor: David Verdaguer — Summer 1993; Juan Diego — Can't Say Goodbye; Bill Nighy — The Bookshop; Jaime Ordóñez — The Bar; Oriol Pla — Uncertain Glory; Antonio de la Torre — The Motive	Best Supporting Actress: Adelfa Calvo — The Motive; Anna Castillo — Holy Camp!; Belén Cuesta — Holy Camp!; Lola Dueñas — Can't Say Goodbye; Gracia Olayo — Holy Camp!
Best Original Soundtrack: Pascal Gaigne — Giant; José Luis Perales, Pablo Perales — The Motive; Carlos Riera, Joan Valent — The Bar; Alfonso de Vilallonga — The Bookshop; Chucky Namanera (Eugenio Mira) — Veronica	Best Trailer: Holy Camp!; The Motive; The Bar; Skins; Summer 1993; Veronica
Best Film Poster: Giant; The Bar; Holy Camp!; Skins; Summer 1993	Best Documentary Film: La Chana; Converso; Esquece Monelos; Muchos hijos, un mono y un castillo; Niñato
Special Award: Life and Nothing More; Júlia ist; La mano invisible; The Tunnel Gang; Mimosas

=== Television ===
Best Drama Series: La zona (season 1, Movistar+); La casa de papel (season 1, Antena 3); Estoy vivo (season 1, TVE); El ministerio del tiempo (season 3, TVE); Sé quién eres (season 1, Telecinco)	Best Comedy Series: Vergüenza (season 1, Movistar+); Allí abajo (season 3, Antena 3); El fin de la comedia (season 2, Comedy Central)
Best Main Actor: Javier Gutiérrez — Vergüenza; Eduard Fernández — La zona; Francesc Garrido — Sé quién eres; Álvaro Morte -— Money Heist; Hugo Silva — El ministerio del tiempo	Best Main Actress: Malena Alterio — Vergüenza; Úrsula Corberó — Money Heist; Aura Garrido — El Ministerio del Tiempo; Alexandra Jiménez — La zona; Blanca Portillo — Sé quién eres
Best Supporting Actor: Miguel Rellán — Vergüenza; Jaime Blanch — El Ministerio del Tiempo; Àlex Monner — Sé quién eres; Alejo Sauras — Estoy vivo; Paco Tous — Money Heist	Best Supporting Actress: Emma Suárez — La zona; Susana Abaitua — Sé quién eres; Alba Flores — Money Heist; Cayetana Guillén Cuervo — El ministerio del tiempo; Ana Polvorosa — Cable Girls

=== Feroz de Honor ===
- Verónica Forqué

== See also ==
- 32nd Goya Awards
