= Vergüenza (TV series) =

- Genre: Comedy; Cringe comedy
- Created by: Álvaro Fernández Armero; Juan Cavestany
- Starring: Javier Gutiérrez; Malena Alterio
- Country of origin: Spain
- Original language: Spanish
- No. of seasons: 3
- No. of episodes: 23

Production
- Production companies: Apache Films; Movistar+

Original release
- Network: Movistar+
- Release: 24 November 2017 – 14 February 2020

Related
- Pena ajena

Vergüenza is a Spanish comedy television series starring Malena Alterio and Javier Gutiérrez. The fiction follows the developments in the marriage formed by Jesús (Gutiérrez) and Nuria (Alterio). Created, written and directed by Álvaro Fernández Armero and Juan Cavestany, the first season aired on Movistar+ in 2017.

== Premise ==
Jesús Gutiérrez is an awkward man working as photographer for hire in weddings, baptisms and (first) communions, normally unaware of the cringe he causes in others because of his clumsiness, while his wife Nuria suffers from the consequences of the former.

The fiction is set in Madrid at the present time.

== Cast ==
- Javier Gutiérrez as Jesús Gutiérrez
- Malena Alterio as Nuria
- Miguel Rellán as Carlos
- Lola Casamayor as Maricarmen
- Vito Sanz as Óscar
- Yannick Nguenkam as Yusuf
- Pol López as Ramón
- Teresa Cuesta as Vanessa
- Marta Nieto as Andrea
- Jaime Zarataín as Guillermo
- María Hervás as Mayte.
- Enric Benavent as Francisco
- Resu Morales as Aurora
- Teresa Hurtado de Ory as María

== Production and release ==
While Fernández Armero has a substantial TV career, Vergüenza was Cavestany's debut in television. The first season of the series consisted of ten episodes, with a running time ranging from 22 to 26 minutes. The idea for the series predated the actual release by nearly ten years.

The filming took place in locations of Madrid and the wider Community of Madrid in 2016.

The full first season of the series was originally released under video-on-demand by Movistar+ on 24 November 2017.

The series spawned a Mexican adaptation, Pena ajena.

== Awards and nominations ==
Year	Award	Category	Nominees	Result	Ref.
2018	5th Feroz Awards	Best Comedy Series		Won	
2018	5th Feroz Awards	Best Leading Actress in TV	Malena Alterio	Won	
2018	5th Feroz Awards	Best Leading Actor in TV	Javier Gutiérrez	Won	
2018	5th Feroz Awards	Best Supporting Actor in TV	Miguel Rellán	Won	
2018	68th Fotogramas de Plata	Best Television Actress	Malena Alterio	Won	
2018	27th Actors and Actresses Union Awards	Best Leading Actress in TV	Malena Alterio	Won	
2019	6th Feroz Awards	Best Comedy Series		Nominated	
2019	6th Feroz Awards	Best Leading Actress in TV	Malena Alterio	Nominated	
2019	6th Feroz Awards	Best Leading Actor in TV	Javier Gutiérrez	Nominated	
2019	6th Feroz Awards	Best Supporting Actor in TV	Miguel Rellán	Nominated	
2021	8th Feroz Awards	Best Comedy Series		Nominated	
