= Paquita Salas =

- Created by: Javier Calvo; Javier Ambrossi
- Directed by: Javier Calvo; Javier Ambrossi
- Starring: Brays Efe; Belén Cuesta; Lidia San José; Álex de Lucas; Mariona Terés
- Country of origin: Spain
- Original language: Spanish
- No. of seasons: 3
- No. of episodes: 16

Production
- Executive producer: Roberto López Lafuente
- Running time: 30 minutes
- Production companies: DMNTIA (S. 1); Apache Films (S. 2–3); Suma Latina (S. 3)

Original release
- Network: Flooxer (S. 1); Netflix S. 2–3
- Release: July 6, 2016 – present

Paquita Salas is a Spanish comedy television series created by Javier Calvo and Javier Ambrossi. It first premiered on the web platform Flooxer in July 2016. After unexpected success, the series eventually aired on television channel Neox. Netflix acquired the series in October 2017 and renewed the show for second and third seasons. The second season premiered on June 29, 2018. In May 2018, a third season was scheduled for 2020, but surprisingly Netflix announced that the third season would arrive in 2019. The third season premiered on June 28, 2019. A fourth season was confirmed for the future.

== Synopsis ==
Paquita Salas is a talent agent who used to be at the top of her industry in the 90s. But times have changed and she hasn't. Now her agency, PS Management, is struggling to find new clients and keep the ones it already has due to her outdated professional style. When her most high profile client dumps her, Paquita's world comes crashing down. Alongside her faithful secretary Magüi, Paquita is forced to reinvent herself while searching for new talent.

== Cast ==
- Brays Efe as Paquita Salas
- Belén Cuesta as Magüi Moreno
- Lidia San José as herself
- Mariona Terés as herself (main season 1–2)
- Álex de Lucas as himself (main season 1–2, recurring season 3)
- Anna Castillo as Belén de Lucas (main season 2–present, guest season 1)
- Yolanda Ramos as Noemí Argüelles (main season 2–present, guest season 1)
- Belinda Washington as herself (main season 3–present, guest season 1–2)
- Terelu Campos as Bárbara Valiente (main season 3–present, guest season 2)

== Series overview ==
Season	Episodes	Originally released		
Season	Episodes	First released	Last released	Network
1	5	July 6, 2016	October 25, 2016	Flooxer
2	5	June 29, 2018		Netflix
3	6	June 28, 2019		Netflix

== Episodes ==
=== Season 1 (2016) ===
No. overall	No. in season	Title	Directed by	Written by	Original release date
1	1	"Married to This"	Javier Calvo, Javier Ambrossi	Javier Calvo, Javier Ambrossi	July 6, 2016
2	2	"The Actress 360"	Javier Calvo, Javier Ambrossi	Javier Calvo, Javier Ambrossi	September 13, 2016
3	3	"Back to Navarrete"	Javier Calvo, Javier Ambrossi	Javier Calvo, Javier Ambrossi	September 13, 2016
4	4	"Divacel"	Javier Calvo, Javier Ambrossi	Javier Calvo, Javier Ambrossi	September 27, 2016
5	5	"The Magic in You"	Javier Calvo, Javier Ambrossi	Javier Calvo, Javier Ambrossi	October 25, 2016

=== Season 2 (2018) ===
No. overall	No. in season	Title	Directed by	Written by	Original release date
6	1	"The Voice of the Cult"	Javier Calvo, Javier Ambrossi	Javier Calvo, Javier Ambrossi	June 29, 2018
7	2	"Charitable"	Javier Calvo, Javier Ambrossi	Brays Efe	June 29, 2018
8	3	"The Secret"	Javier Calvo, Javier Ambrossi	Javier Calvo, Javier Ambrossi	June 29, 2018
9	4	"The Last Torrezno in Tarazona"	Javier Calvo, Javier Ambrossi	Javier Calvo, Javier Ambrossi	June 29, 2018
10	5	"Starting Point"	Javier Calvo, Javier Ambrossi	Javier Calvo, Javier Ambrossi	June 29, 2018

=== Season 3 (2019) ===
No. overall	No. in season	Title	Directed by	Written by	Original release date
11	1	"Cadillac Solitario"	Javier Calvo, Javier Ambrossi	Javier Calvo, Javier Ambrossi	June 28, 2019
12	2	"Edwin"	Javier Calvo, Javier Ambrossi	Javier Calvo, Javier Ambrossi	June 28, 2019
13	3	"B-Fashion"	Javier Calvo, Javier Ambrossi	Javier Calvo, Javier Ambrossi	June 28, 2019
14	4	"Viral"	Javier Calvo, Javier Ambrossi	Javier Calvo, Javier Ambrossi	June 28, 2019
15	5	"Regional Dances"	Javier Calvo, Javier Ambrossi	Javier Calvo, Javier Ambrossi	June 28, 2019
16	6	"Back to Navarrete II"	Javier Calvo, Javier Ambrossi	Javier Calvo, Javier Ambrossi	June 28, 2019
