= La zona (TV series) =

- TV series poster
- Genre: Dystopian; Crime drama
- Created by: Jorge Sánchez-Cabezudo; Alberto Sánchez-Cabezudo
- Starring: Eduard Fernández; Emma Suárez; Alexandra Jiménez; Tamar Novas; Álvaro Cervantes; Marina Salas; Sergio Peris-Mencheta; Manolo Solo; Inma Cuevas; Juan Echanove; Carlos Bardem; Luis Zahera; Alba Galocha; Carlos Rodríguez
- Original language: Spanish
- No. of seasons: 1
- No. of episodes: 8

Production
- Executive producer: Movistar+
- Running time: 50 minutes (approx.)
- Production company: Kowalski Films

Original release
- Network: #0
- Release: October 27, 2017

La zona is a Spanish dystopian drama limited series created by Alberto and Jorge Sánchez-Cabezudo for Movistar+. The series contains 8 episodes, and premiered on 27 October 2017 on #0 and Movistar+'s VOD service.

== Premise ==
Police inspector Héctor Uría returns to work three years after a nuclear disaster in Green Spain; Uría was the sole survivor of the first rescue team that reached the reactor. Now, he must conduct the investigation of the brutal murder of a man in the exclusion zone.

== Cast ==
=== Main cast ===
- Eduard Fernández as Inspector Héctor Uría
- Emma Suárez as Marta Carcedo
- Alexandra Jiménez as Julia Martos
- Alba Galocha as Zoe Montero
- Álvaro Cervantes as Martín Garrido
- Marina Salas as Esther Uría Carcedo

=== Recurring cast ===
- Tamar Novas as Ricardo
- Inma Cuevas as Fabiana Garmendia
- Salva Reina as Gabriel Sánchez Soler "El Caníbal"
- Sergio Peris-Mencheta as Aurelio Barrero
- Manolo Solo as Alfredo Asunción
- Luis Zahera as Lucio Braña Izquierdo
- Daniel Pérez Prada as Pablo Gómez Asensio "Pelirrojo"
- Carlos Bardem as Mateo Jiménez Corral "Krusty"
- Juan Echanove as Fausto Armendáriz
- Josean Bengoetxea as Luis Carreño
- Carlos Rodríguez as Dani
- Pau Durá as Delegado Ferreras
- Daniel Jumillas as Pipo
- Emilio Palacios as Bruno
- Germán Alkarazu as Federico Uría
- María Cantuel as Sara
- Fernando Sánchez-Cabezudo as Enrique
- Inma Nieto as Juez Noriega
- Félix Arkarazo as Ramón
- Oleg Kricunova as Román
- Sonsoles Benedicto as Amalia
- Juan Codina as Manuel Montero
- Ana Gracia as Abogada de Zoe
- Pilar Gómez as Rosa Hernández
- Francisco Olmos as Comisario Vázquez
- Maite Brik as Luisa

== Episodes ==
No.	Title	Directed by
1	"En tierra de nadie"	Jorge Sánchez-Cabezudo
2	"Control animal"	Jorge Sánchez-Cabezudo
3	"El balneario"	Jorge Sánchez-Cabezudo
4	"Insomnio"	Jorge Sánchez-Cabezudo
5	"La lluvia"	Paco R. Baños
6	"El mal necesario"	Jorge Sánchez-Cabezudo
7	"Pérdida accidental de refrigerante"	Jorge Sánchez-Cabezudo
8	"El último lobo"	Jorge Sánchez-Cabezudo

== International broadcast ==
The series was picked up by Starz for the United States. In France, it was picked up by Canal+, and by ZDF in Germany. In Latin America, it is available through Movistar Series and Movistar Play.

== Awards and nominations ==
Year	Award	Category	Nominees	Result	Ref.
2018	Feroz Awards	Best Drama Series		Won	
2018	Feroz Awards	Best Leading Actress in TV	Alexandra Jiménez	Nominated	
2018	Feroz Awards	Best Leading Actor in TV	Eduard Fernández	Nominated	
2018	Feroz Awards	Best Supporting Actress in TV	Emma Suárez	Won	
