= Fotogramas de Plata =

Annual Spanish film, theater, and television awards

- Awarded for: Excellence in film, theatre and television
- Sponsored by: Fotogramas magazine
- Country: Spain
- Formerly called: Placa de San Juan Bosco
- First award: February 5, 1951; 75 years ago
- Website: www.fotogramas.es/fotogramas-de-plata/

Fotogramas de Plata are a series of Spanish annual film, theatre and television awards awarded by Fotogramas film magazine since 1951. The Film Awards -foreign and national- are given by specialized critics and those awarded to the performers are chosen by the public.

On 5 February 1951, Fotogramas magazine awarded their first Placa de San Juan Bosco award to actor Jesús Tordesillas for his performance in 1950 film Pequeñeces. New categories were added over time to the award, they were renamed to Fotogramas de Plata and in 2012 they absorbed the TP de Oro awards.
