= Jaguar (TV series) =

Spanish television series

- Genre: Historical drama; Thriller; Action
- Created by: Ramón Campos; Gema R. Neira
- Directed by: Carlos Sedes; Jacobo Martínez
- Starring: Blanca Suárez; Iván Marcos; Francesc Garrido; Adrián Lastra; Óscar Casas
- Country of origin: Spain
- Original languages: Spanish; German
- No. of seasons: 1
- No. of episodes: 6

Production
- Executive producers: Ramón Campos; Teresa Fernández-Valdés
- Running time: 37–51 minutes
- Production company: Bambú Producciones

Original release
- Network: Netflix
- Release: 22 September 2021

Jaguar is a Spanish drama streaming television series created by Ramón Campos and Gema R. Neira for Netflix. It stars Blanca Suárez, Iván Marcos, Francesc Garrido, Adrián Lastra and Óscar Casas. Its first season was released on 22 September 2021.

== Premise ==
Set in the 1960s, where Spain housed hundreds of Nazi refugees after World War II, Isabel Riaza, a Spaniard who managed to survive the Mauthausen concentration camp, is on the trail of Otto Bachmann, known as the most dangerous man in Europe. She discovers that she is not alone in her mission and joins a group of agents in search of justice.

The Bachmann character was inspired by SS-Obersturmbannführer Otto Skorzeny.

== Cast ==
- Blanca Suárez as Isabel Garrido.
- Iván Marcos as Lucena.
- Francesc Garrido as Marsé.
- Adrián Lastra as Sordo.
- Óscar Casas as Castro.
- Pepe Ocio as Manuel Pertegaz.
- Stefan Weinert as Otto Bachmann
- Jochen Horst as Aribert Heim

== Production and release ==
Jaguar was created by Ramón Campos and Gema R. Neira. Produced by Bambú Producciones, Ramón Campos and Teresa Fernández-Valdés were credited as executive producers. Alongside Campos and Neira, David Orea, Salvador S. Molina and Moisés Gómez completed the writing team. Directed by Carlos Sedes and Jacobo Martínez, the series began filming on 7 August 2020. Besides Madrid, footage was also shot in the provinces of Almería (Cabo de Gata Natural Park), Toledo (Villaseca de la Sagra) and Segovia (El Espinar).

Consisting of 6 episodes featuring a running time of around 40–50 min, the first season was fully released on Netflix on 22 September 2021.

== Episodes ==
No.	Title	Directed by	Original release date
1	"Haus"	Carlos Sedes	22 September 2021
2	"El hotel"	Carlos Sedes	22 September 2021
3	"El Gran Club"	Carlos Sedes	22 September 2021
4	"Almería"	Carlos Sedes	22 September 2021
5	"El hospital"	Jacobo Martínez	22 September 2021
6	"El molino"	Jacobo Martínez	22 September 2021

== Reception ==
Professional ratings
Review scores
Source	Rating
HobbyConsolas	60/100

Reviewing for HobbyConsolas, Raquel Hernández Luján resented the general approach, which she deemed to be "quite frivolous and even infantile". She also pointed out at the "hieratical" performance of Blanca Suárez, not suited for the role. She praised the blend of different genres and conceded the series was nonetheless addictive and entertaining, even if it could not be taken seriously (pretension of the series notwithstanding). Reviewing for El Español's Series & Más, Javier Zurro commented that the series tried to be many different things, and lacking definition, none of them worked. He contrasted the solemn pomposity of many scenes to, for example, the "delirious" credits teasing a sense of exploitation. He valued positively that Bambú "took a step forward" by taking some distance from the whitewashing of Spanish history (in this case, Francoism) previously criticised in other Bambú historical dramas such as Velvet or Cable Girls. Reviewing for La Vanguardia, Pere Solà Gimferrer deemed the series to be too conventional, credits notwithstanding. He commented that the series could not escape from "commonplaces about trauma, the experiences in the extermination camps or the dilemma between justice and revenge".
