= Got Talent: All-Stars =

Spanish TV talent competition program

- Genre: Reality; Talent contest
- Presented by: Santi Millán
- Judges: Paula Echevarría; Edurne; Risto Mejide; Fernando Tejero (ep. 1); Leo Harlem (ep. 2); Jorge Blass (ep. 3); Dani Fernández (ep. 4); Carlos Areces (ep. 5); Luis Zahera (ep. 6); TheGrefg (ep. 7)
- Country of origin: Spain
- Original language: Spanish
- No. of seasons: 1
- No. of episodes: 7

Production
- Producer: FremantleMedia
- Running time: 90 minutes
- Production companies: FremantleMedia; Syco Entertainment

Original release
- Network: Telecinco
- Release: 15 April – 3 June 2023

Related
- Got Talent España; America's Got Talent: All-Stars

Got Talent: All-Stars is a Spanish reality television talent competition series that premiered on Telecinco on 15 April 2023. The program is a spin-off to the original Got Talent España and based on the original, America's Got Talent: All-Stars, featuring winners, finalists, fan favorites, and others from previous seasons of the main show and across the Got Talent franchise. Santi Millán hosts the series, with Risto Mejide, Edurne, and Paula Echevarría serving as judges. In the finale, the winner receives a cash prize of €25,000.

== Production ==
Main Judges and Presenter for Got Talent: All-Stars

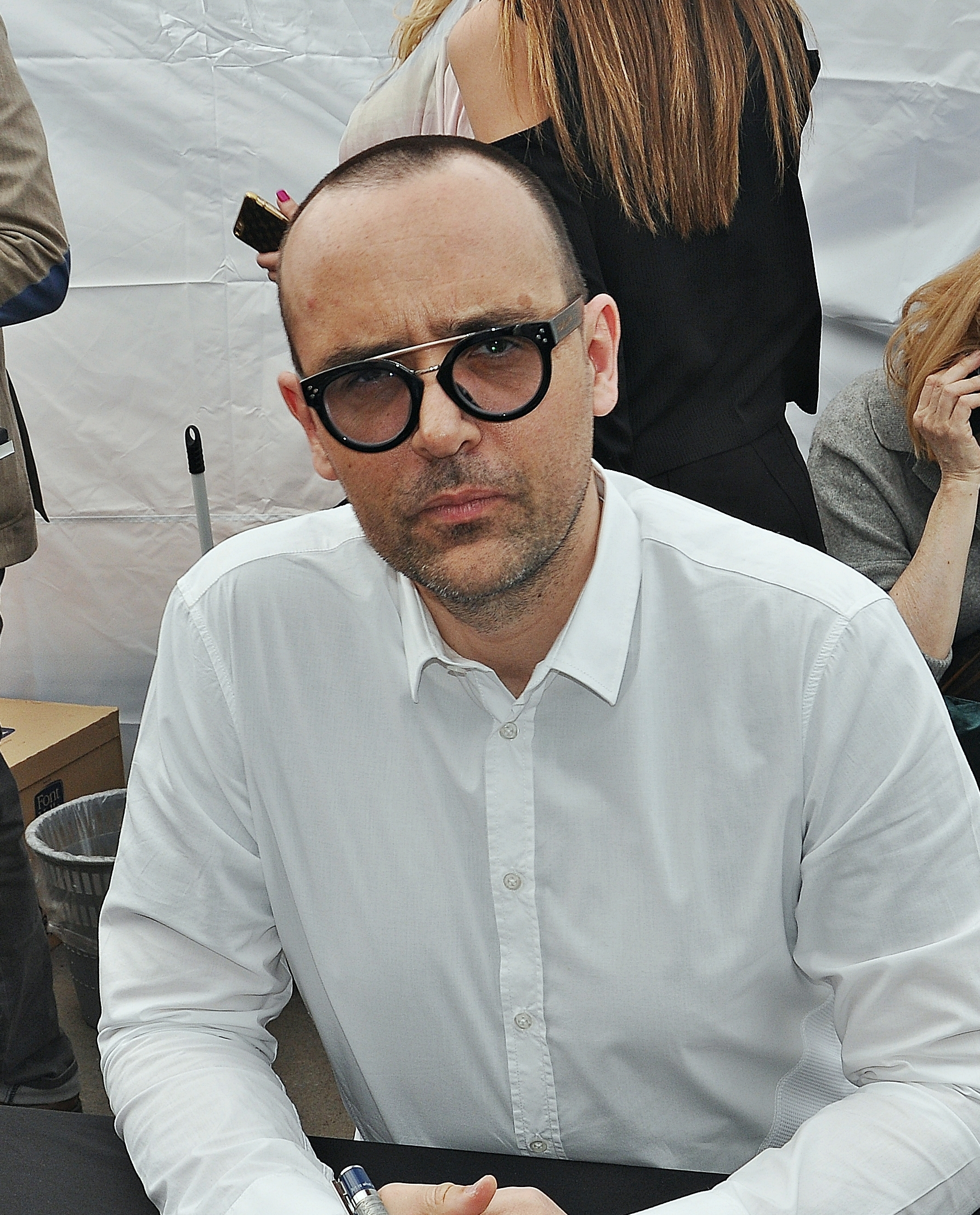
Risto Mejide

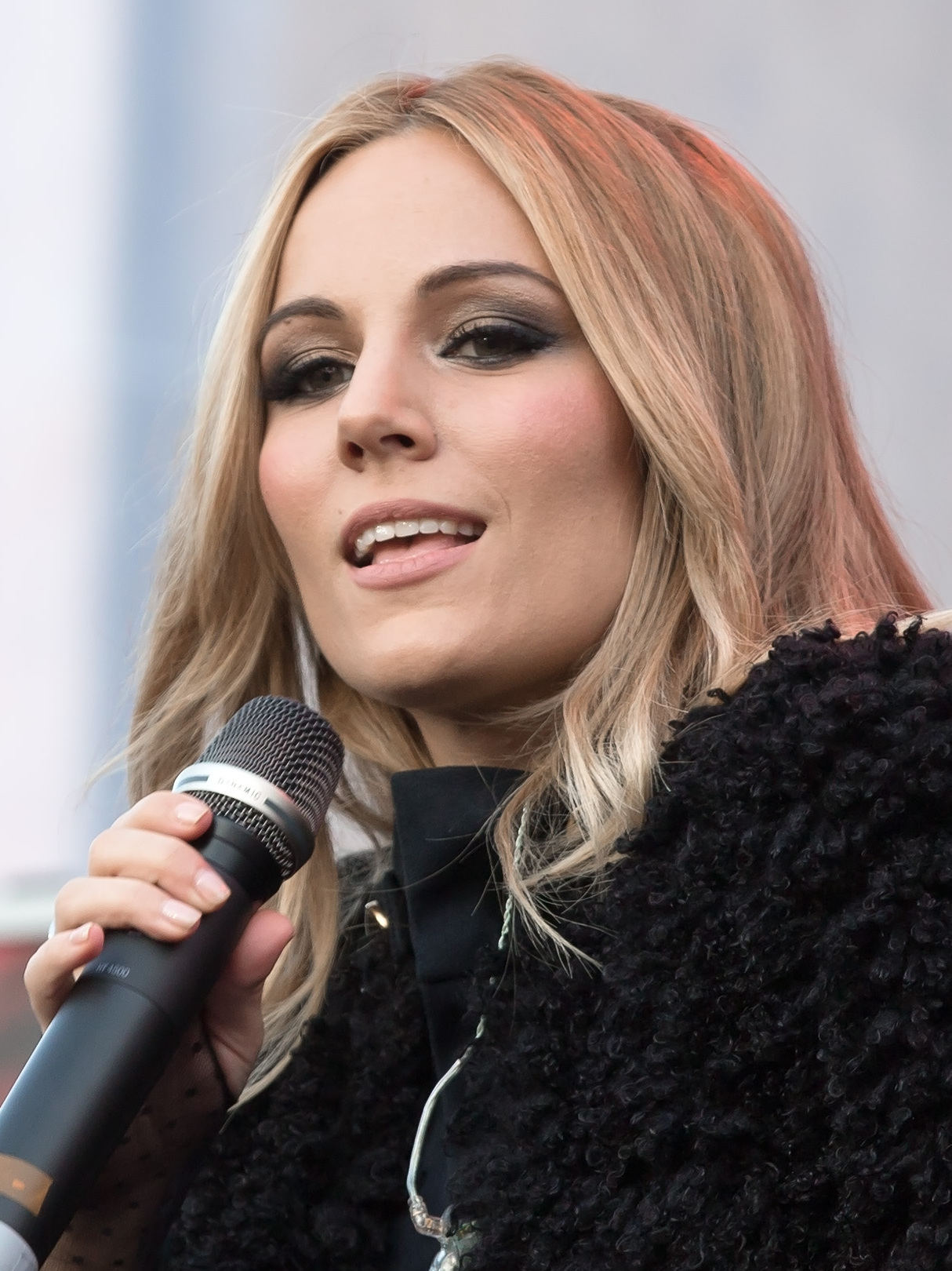
Edurne

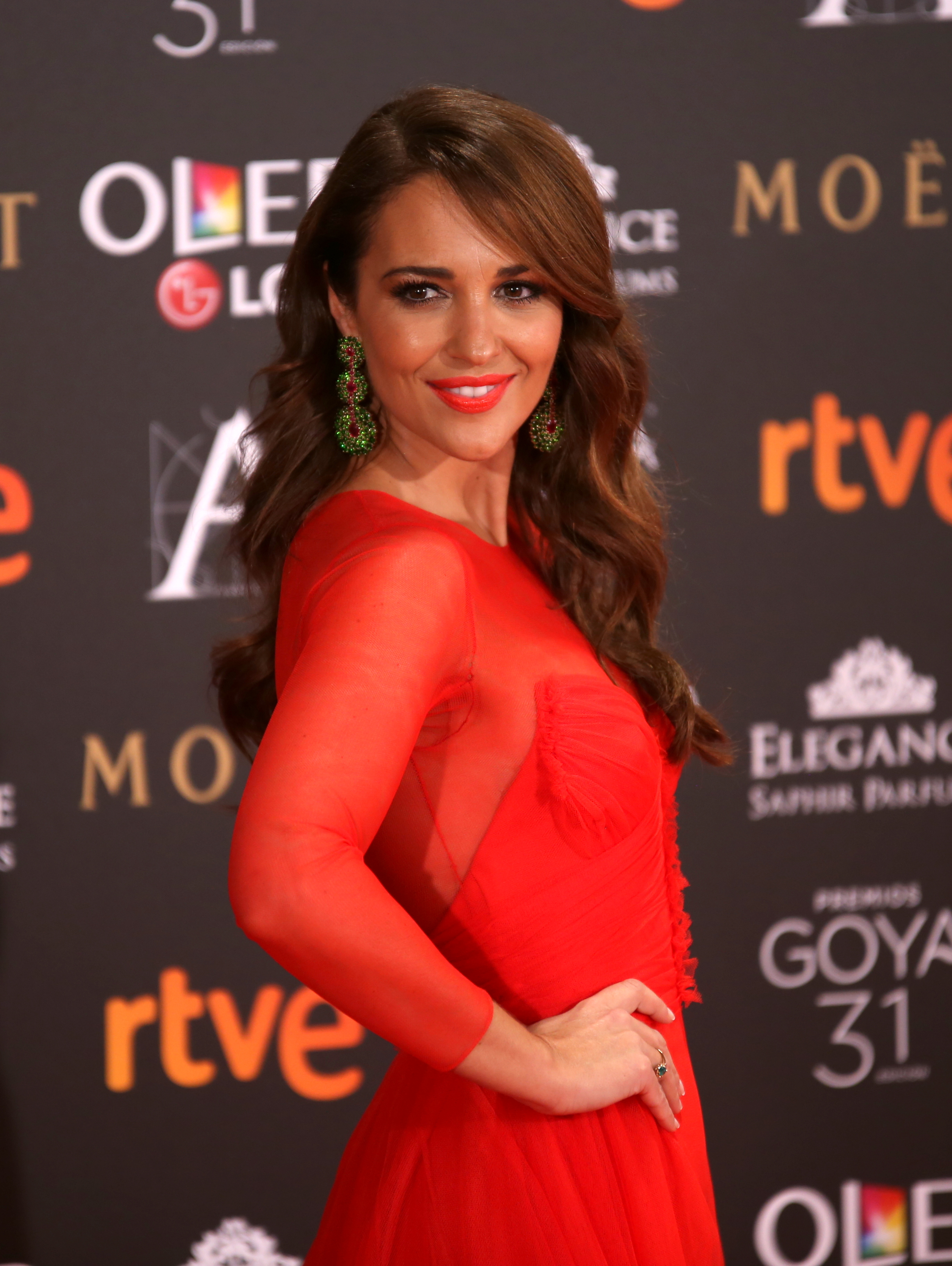
Paula Echevarría

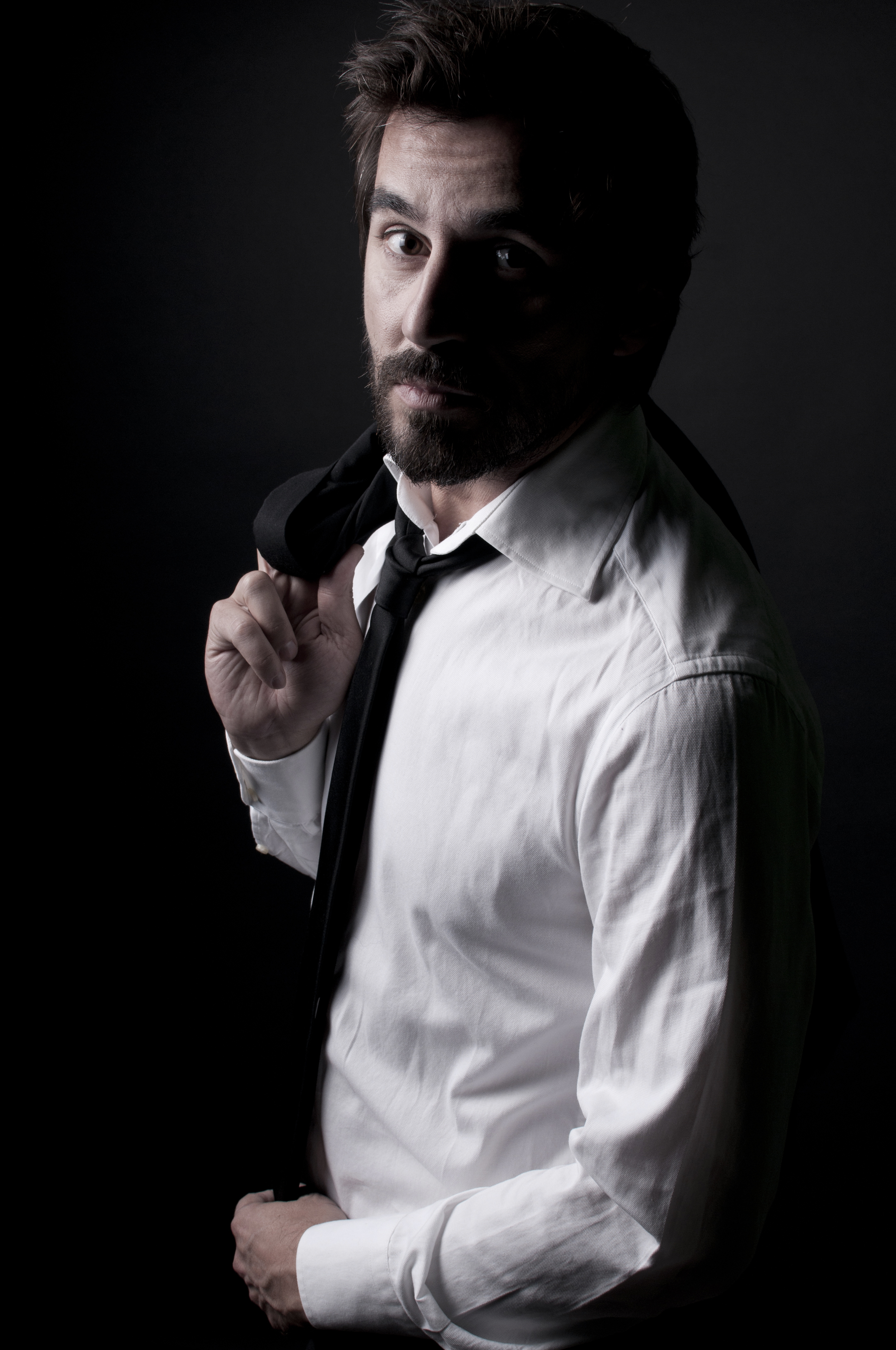
Santi Millán

On 29 March 2023, Telecinco announced Got Talent: All-Stars, the first international adaptation of the America's Got Talent: All-Stars format outside the United States. Similar to other All-Stars editions of the franchise, the competition featured winners, finalists, semifinalists and Golden Buzzer acts from various international versions of Got Talent competing for the All-Star title.

The series was judged by Risto Mejide, Paula Echevarría and Edurne, with a different guest judge appearing in each episode, and was hosted by Santi Millán. The series premiered on 15 April 2023 and concluded on 3 June 2023.

== Overview ==
The preliminary rounds featured twelve acts per episode. In each show, the regular judging panel was joined by a guest judge, who was awarded a Golden Buzzer that automatically advanced one act to the Grand Final.

The remaining acts competed for a place in the Grand Final through a public vote. After the audience selected their top three performances, one of the show's judges was randomly assigned to choose which of the three acts would advance.

The following table lists all contestants who participated in the competition, together with their previous appearances within the Got Talent franchise, including the respective international edition, season, and result, arranged in chronological order from their earliest to most recent appearance.

Got Talent History Key	AGT — America's Got Talent	AGTAS — America's Got Talent: All-Stars	AGTE — America's Got Talent: Extreme	AGTC — America's Got Talent: The Champions	AsGT — Asia's Got Talent	AuGT — Australia's Got Talent
Got Talent History Key	BGT — Britain's Got Talent	BGTC — Britain's Got Talent: The Champions	BGTUM — Britain's Got Talent: The Ultimate Magician	BTT — Balgariya tarsi talant (Bulgaria's Got Talent)	CGT — Canada's Got Talent	CST — Česko Slovensko má talent (Czech Slovak's Got Talent)
Got Talent History Key	ChGT — China's Got Talent	DS — Das Supertalent	FIT — La France a un incroyable talent (France's Got Talent)	FITBJ — La France a un incroyable talent: La Bataille Du Jury (France's Got Talent: Battle Of The Judges)	GGT — Georgia's Got Talent	SGT — Got Talent España
Got Talent History Key	IGT — India's Got Talent	ItGT — Italia's Got Talent	JGT — Japan's Got Talent	RT — Românii au talent (Romania's Got Talent)	MS — Минута славы (Russia's Got Talent)	WGT — World's Got Talent

Winner | Runner-up | Third place | Finalist
Eliminated | Golden Buzzer

Participant	Act	Preliminary	Results
Aaron & Jasmine		3	Eliminated
Aidan Bryant		2	Finalist
Alfred Cobami		6	Eliminated
Argendance		3	Eliminated
B Unique Crew		5	Third place
Bad Salsa		6	Finalist
Balla Brothers		2	Eliminated
Belinda Davids		6	Finalist
Bello Sisters		2	Finalist
Boogie Storm		1	Eliminated
Brendon Peel & Li Lau		3	Eliminated
Brodwei		2	Eliminated
Celia Muñoz		4	Eliminated
Chiko		3	Eliminated
Christian Stoinev		4	Eliminated
Danny ZZZZ		5	Eliminated
David Mazzoni		6	Eliminated
Dimitry Politov		6	Eliminated
DMU Gospel Choir		5	Eliminated
Duo MainTenanT		4	Eliminated
Duo Prime		3	Eliminated
Duo Rings		1	Eliminated
Duo Transcend		6	Eliminated
Duo Vita		5	Eliminated
Elastic Show		4	Eliminated
Ella Shaw		2	Eliminated
Ember Trio		1	Eliminated
Eric Chien		1	Finalist
Fakir Testa		1	Eliminated
Gennady		2	Eliminated
Gomonov Knife Show		3	Eliminated
Human Fountains		5	Finalist
Jai McDowall		5	Eliminated
James & Dylan Piper		1	Eliminated
JD Iceman		2	Eliminated
João Paulo Ferreira		4	Eliminated
Jonathan Rinny		4	Eliminated
Jordi Caps		5	Eliminated
Junwoo Park		4	Eliminated
Kyle Tomlinson		3	Finalist
Léa Kyle		5	Eliminated
Les Beaux Frères		3	Eliminated
Les French Twins		2	Eliminated
Les frères Colle		3	Eliminated
Les Sancho		2	Eliminated
Marc Spelmann		6	Eliminated
Max Ostler		6	Eliminated
Maxwell Thorpe		2	Eliminated
Messoudi Brothers		6	Eliminated
Moses Concas		3	Finalist
Natasha		1	Eliminated
Neodance Academy		4	Eliminated
Nicolas RIBS		3	Eliminated
Oleg Tatarynov		5	Eliminated
Olena Uutai		3	Eliminated
Patrizio Ratto		6	Eliminated
Ramadhani Brothers		1	Finalist
Revelation Avenue		1	Eliminated
Russian Bar Trio		5	Eliminated
State of the Fart		6	Eliminated
Stefanny & Yeeremy		4	Winner
TanBA		2	Eliminated
Tape Face		1	Eliminated
The Kung Fu Fam		2	Eliminated
Tom Ball		1	Eliminated
Tulga		4	Eliminated
Uzeyer Novruzov		1	Eliminated
Vardanyan Brothers		4	Runner-up
Wonsembe		5	Eliminated
X-Adows		6	Eliminated
Xavier Constantine		5	Eliminated
Yumbo Dump		4	Eliminated

=== Preliminaries Summary ===
Golden Buzzer Advancement | Won Judge's choice | Advanced to Top 3 | Eliminated | Buzzed out

==== Preliminary 1 (15 April) ====
Fernando Tejero served as a guest judge episode and was granted a Golden Buzzer to automatically advance a contestant to the finale. Risto Mejide was chosen to choose one act from the top 3 audience vote.

Participant	Order	Buzzes				Result
Participant	Order	Mejide	Edurne	Echevarría	Tejero	Result
Ramadhani Brothers	1					Advanced (Mejide's choice)
Tape Face	2					Eliminated
Tom Ball	3					Eliminated (Top 3)
Uzeyer Novruzov	4					Eliminated
James & Dylan Piper	5					Eliminated
Boogie Storm	6					Eliminated
Duo Rings	7					Eliminated (Top 3)
Revelation Avenue	8					Eliminated
Eric Chien	9					Golden Buzzer Advancement
Natasha	10					Eliminated
Ember Trio	11					Eliminated
Fakir Testa	12					Eliminated

==== Preliminary 2 (22 April) ====
Leo Harlem served as a guest judge episode and was granted a Golden Buzzer to automatically advance a contestant to the finale. Edurne was chosen to choose one act from the top 3 audience vote.

Participant	Order	Buzzes				Result
Participant	Order	Mejide	Edurne	Echevarría	Harlem	Result
Aidan Bryant	1					Advanced (Edurne's choice)
Les French Twins	2					Eliminated
JD Iceman	3					Eliminated
Les Sancho	4					Eliminated
Ella Shaw	5					Eliminated
Balla Brothers	6					Eliminated
Brodwei	7					Eliminated (Top 3)
TanBA	8					Eliminated (Top 3)
Bello Sisters	9					Golden Buzzer Advancement
Maxwell Thorpe	10					Eliminated
The Kung Fu Fam	11					Eliminated
Gennady Tkachenko-Papizh	12					Eliminated

==== Preliminary 3 (29 April) ====
Jorge Blass served as a guest judge episode and was granted a Golden Buzzer to automatically advance a contestant to the finale. Paula Echevarría was chosen to choose one act from the top 3 audience vote.

Participant	Order	Buzzes				Result
Participant	Order	Mejide	Edurne	Echevarría	Blass	Result
Gomonov Knife Show	1					Eliminated
Les Beaux Frères	2					Eliminated
Nicolas RIBS	3					Eliminated
Kyle Tomlinson	4					Advanced (Echevarría's choice)
Chiko	5					Eliminated
Aaron & Jasmine	6					Eliminated (Top 3)
Les frères Colle	7					Eliminated
Brendon Peel & Li Lau	8					Eliminated
Moses Concas	9					Golden Buzzer Advancement
Argendance	10					Eliminated
Duo Prime	11					Eliminated
Gennady Tkachenko-Papizh	12					Eliminated (Top 3)

==== Preliminary 4 (6 May) ====
Dani Fernández served as a guest judge episode and was granted a Golden Buzzer to automatically advance a contestant to the finale. Risto Mejide was chosen to choose one act from the top 3 audience vote.

Participant	Order	Buzzes				Result
Participant	Order	Mejide	Edurne	Echevarría	Fernández	Result
Jonathan Rinny	1					Eliminated
Celia Muñoz	2					Eliminated (Top 3)
Neodance Academy	3					Eliminated
Tulga	4					Eliminated
Junwoo Park	5					Eliminated
Christian Stoinev	6					Eliminated
Stefanny & Yeeremy	7					Advanced (Mejide's choice)
Vardanyan Brothers	8					Golden Buzzer Advancement
Yumbo Dump	9					Eliminated
João Paulo Ferreira	10					Eliminated (Top 3)
Duo MainTenanT	11					Eliminated
Elastic Show	12					Eliminated

==== Preliminary 5 (20 May) ====
Carlos Areces served as a guest judge episode and was granted a Golden Buzzer to automatically advance a contestant to the finale. Paula Echevarría was chosen to choose one act from the top 3 audience vote.

Participant	Order	Buzzes				Result
Participant	Order	Mejide	Edurne	Echevarría	Areces	Result
Léa Kyle	1					Eliminated (Top 3)
DMU Gospel Choir	2					Eliminated
B Unique Crew	3					Advanced (Echevarría's choice)
Russian Bar Trio	4					Eliminated
Jordi Caps	5					Eliminated
Wonsembe	6					Eliminated
Jai McDowall	7					Eliminated
Duo Vita	8					Eliminated
Human Fountains	9					Golden Buzzer Advancement
Danny ZZZZ	10					Eliminated
Oleg Tatarynov	11					Eliminated (Top 3)
Xavier Constantine	12					Eliminated

==== Preliminary 6 (27 May) ====
Luis Zahera served as a guest judge episode and was granted a Golden Buzzer to automatically advance a contestant to the finale. Edurne was chosen to choose one act from the top 3 audience vote.

Participant	Order	Buzzes				Result
Participant	Order	Mejide	Edurne	Echevarría	Zahera	Result
Duo Transcend	1					Eliminated (Top 3)
Marc Spelmann	2					Eliminated
Bad Salsa	3					Advanced (Edurne's choice)
David Mazzoni	4					Eliminated
Dimitry Politov	5					Eliminated (Top 3)
Max Ostler	6					Eliminated
Messoudi Brothers	7					Eliminated
Patrizio Ratto	8					Eliminated
Belinda Davids	9					Golden Buzzer Advancement
Alfred Cobami	10					Eliminated
State of the Fart	11					Eliminated
X-Adows	12					Eliminated

=== Finale (3 June) ===
TheGrefg served as a guest judge this episode.

Winner | Runner-up | 3rd place

Finalist	Order	Result (February 27)
Aidan Bryant	1	Finalist
Bad Salsa	2	Finalist
Ramadhani Brothers	3	Finalist
Eric Chien	4	Finalist
Bello Sisters	5	Finalist
Kyle Tomlinson	6	Finalist
B Unique Crew	7	3rd
Moses Concas	8	Finalist
Vardanyan Brothers	9	2nd
Human Fountains	10	Finalist
Stefanny & Yeeremy	11	1st
Belinda Davids	12	Finalist
