= Marta Hazas =

Spanish actress (born 1977)

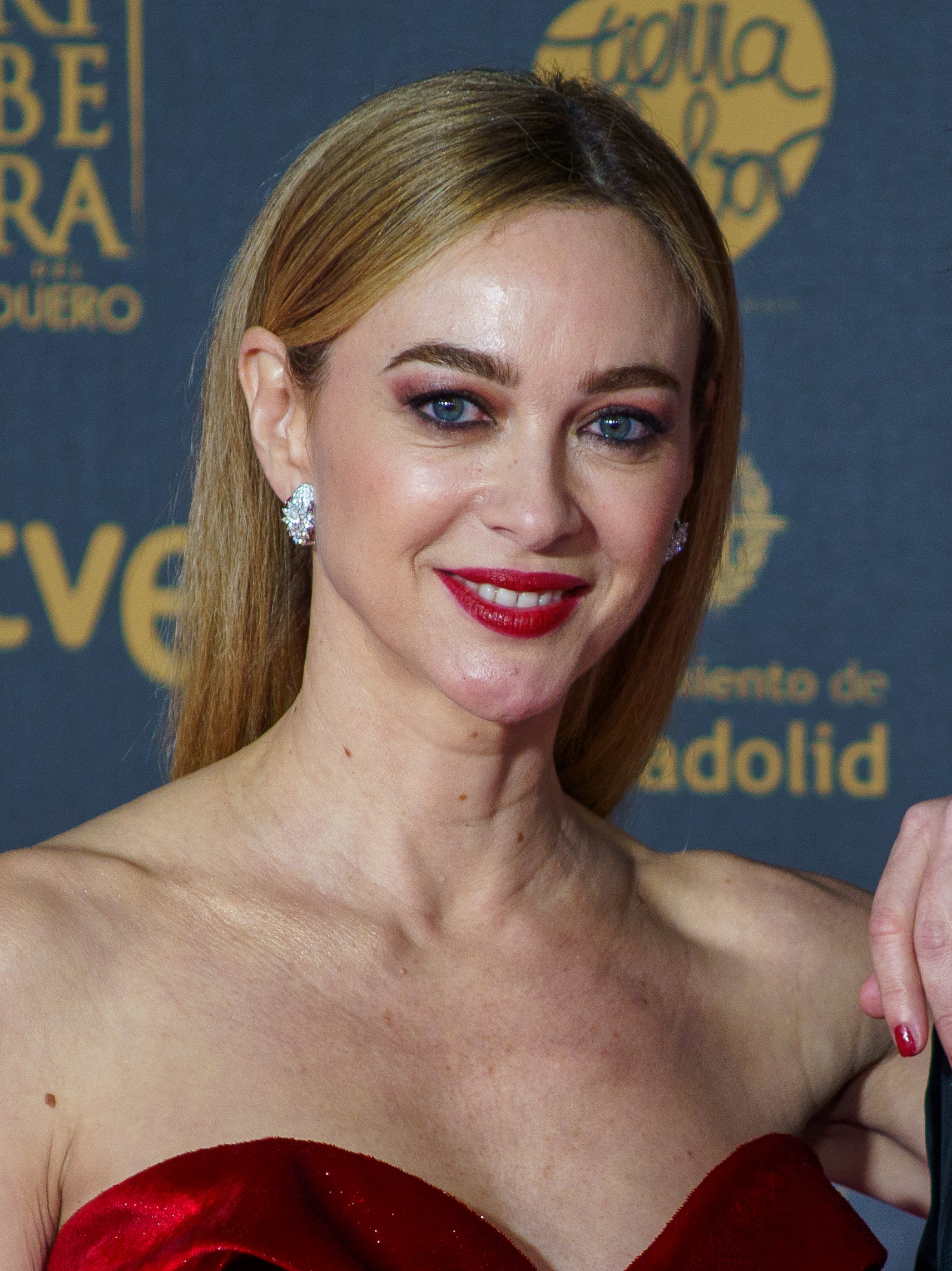
- Hazas in 2024
- Born: Marta Hazas Cuesta; 31 December 1977 (age 48); Santander, Spain
- Occupation: Actress
- Years active: 2001—present
- Spouse: Javier Veiga (m. 2016)

Marta Hazas Cuesta (born 31 December 1977) is a Spanish actress.

== Career ==
Marta Hazas Cuesta was born in Santander on 31 December 1977. She earned a degree in Information Sciences, and she also took artistic training in Spanish dance and drama.

Hazas has acted sporadically in shows like Aída, Los hombres de Paco, Cuéntame cómo pasó, Paco y Veva, Hospital Central, El comisario and Los Serrano. She had a breakthrough role on the small screen with her performance as Amelia Ugarte in the series El internado. She also featured in Gran Hotel with Yon González, Amaia Salamanca and Eloy Azorín, among others. She starred as lead in the daily television series Bandolera. Most recently she played a main role during four seasons in the series of Antena 3 Velvet with Cecilia Freire, Javier Rey, Paula Echevarría and Adrián Lastra. Also, she co-starred the film Friends Till Death (2023). She collaborated in El hormiguero.

== Personal life ==
She has a West Highland Terrier dog since 2011 named Robin, named after Robin Wright. She married actor Javier Veiga on 1 October 2016 at Palacio de la Magdalena in Santander. The wedding was attended by Paula Echevarría and Cecilia Freire.

== Filmography ==
=== Film ===
Year	Title	Role	Notes
2000	Código natural	―	Extra
2002	They're Watching Us	―	Extra
2004	The Amazing World of Borjamari and Pocholo	Mariola	
2004	Reprimidos	Soledad	
2007	Un día cualquiera	Rocío	Short film
2008	8 Dates	Cris	
2011	The Opposite of Love	Silvia	
2011	3,2 (lo que hacen las novias)	Miriam	Short film
2013	Muertos de amor	Reme	
2014	Pancho, el perro millonario	Eva	
2017	Toc Toc	Paciente grupo	Cameo
2018	Te juro que yo no fui	Rebecca	
2021	The Unemployment Club	Laia	
2022	Dancing on Glass	Pilar	
2023	Friends Till Death	María	
2023	My Fault	Rafaella	
2024	Hotel Bitcoin	Mar	
2024	Your Fault	Rafaella	

=== Television ===
Year	Title	Character	Notes
2001	El comisario	Extra	Episode: "Negocio de hienas"
2003	Cuéntame cómo pasó	Girl	2 episodes
2003	Un paso adelante	Receptionist Marta	Episode: «El negocio»
2003	Hospital Central	Student	2 episodes
2004	Paco y Veva	Estrella	Episode: "Alquila como puedas"
2004	Capital	Ruth	Main role; 65 episodes
2005	Fuera de control	Marta	Episode: "Quiero ser feliz"
2005	El pasado es mañana	Pilar Arce	Recurring Role; 8 episodes
2006	Los hombres de Paco	Azafata	Episode: "Aterriza con las muelas"
2006	Aída	Pili	Episode: "Love Actually"
2006	Los Serrano	Sandra	Episode: "Soy nenuco"
2006–2007	SMS	Vicky	Recurring role; 60 episodes
2007–2010	El internado	Amelia Ugarte Roldán / Amelia Henninger	Main role; 64 episodes
2008	Generación D.F.	Paula	Main role; 17 episodes
2008	Impares	Alessandra Sáez de Santamaría	Main role; 30 episodes
2011	Los misterios de Laura	Olivia Larralde	Episode: "El misterio del truco imposible"
2011–2013	Bandolera	Sara Reeves / Sara Hermida Montoya	Main character; 510 episodios
2013	Gran Hotel	Laura Elvira Montenegro Rovinia	Main role; 14 episodes (season 3)
2014–2022	El hormiguero	Herself	Collaborator
2014–2016	Velvet	Clara Montesinos Martín	Main role; 54 episodes
2017–2019	Velvet Colección	Clara Montesinos Martín	Main role; 21 episodes
2018–2021	Pequeñas coincidencias	Marta Valdivia	Protagonista; 30 episodios
2019	You Cannot Hide	Álex's lover	Episode: "Cara a cara"
2021–2022	Rutas bizarras	Herself	Presenter
2022–2023	When You Least Expect It	Sara	Main role; 18 episodes
2024	Desde el mañana	Gabriela "Gaby" Aizpurúa Thompson	Protagonist; 8 episodes
2025	Alpha Males	Mari Mar	Recurring role; 8 episodes (season 3)

=== Teatro ===
Año	Título	Personaje
2002–2003	Mismo amor, mismo coñazo	Protagonist
2003	Elsa Schneider	Protagonist
2003	Cistelaria	Protagonist
2006–2007	Ya van 30	Protagonist
2009–2010	El mercader de Venecia	Porcia
2011–2012	Amigos hasta la muerte	Protagonist
2013–2014	El caballero de Olmedo	Doña Inés
2014	Don Juan Tenorio	Doña Inés
2014–2015	Confesiones de un bartender	Protagonist
2016–2017	5 y... acción	Marisol
