= Melina Matthews =

Spanish actress (born 1986)

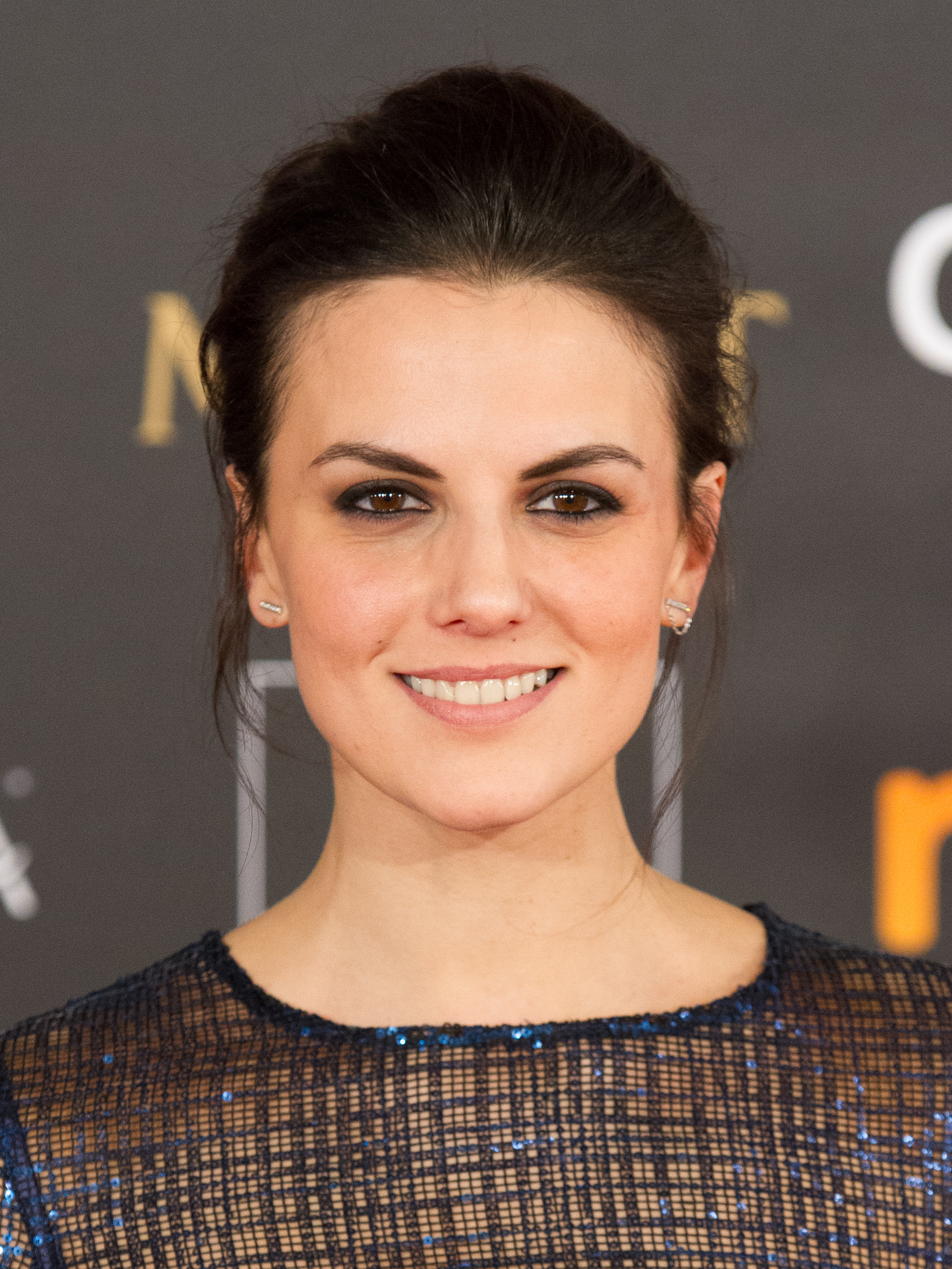
- Matthews in 2018
- Born: 1986 (age 39–40); Barcelona, Spain
- Education: Royal Central School of Speech and Drama
- Occupation: Actress
- Years active: 2005–present

Melina Matthews (born 1986) is a Spain-born actress and presenter, known as a host for the Sitges Film Festival, and for her acting roles as Ana in the 2018 film Silencio, as Juana in season 2 of La peste (2019), as new teacher Carmen in season 2 of A Different View, and as Sister Shannon Masters in Warrior Nun.

== Early life ==
Melina Matthews was born in 1986, in Barcelona; she is the daughter of a Welsh father and a French mother, who were both interpreter/translators. At the age of 19, Matthews moved to London to study for a BA Hons degree in Investigative Journalism at the University of Westminster, graduating in 2009. During her time as a student in London, Matthews studied theatre at the Central School of Speech and Drama working at The Old Vic theatre and at the Southbank Centre, with hopes of pursuing an acting career. Her initial involvement in theatre, was as an accent trainer and dialogue coach, helping American actors to polish their English and Spanish accents.

== Acting career ==
Matthews debut appearance on the big screen was as Laura Moffat in the film Savage Grace in 2007, opposite Julianne Moore and Eddie Redmayne. In 2013, Matthews played the voice of 'Mama' in horror film Mama.

In 2016, Matthews landed a role as Sofía Marín alongside Jodie Comer in the BBC television miniseries Thirteen. Melina Matthews co-starred alongside Marc Clotet as lovers in the film El jugador de ajedrez (The Chess Player), which featured at the Málaga Film Festival 2017. Matthews played the lead actress role as 'Ana' in the Mexico-based 2018 film Silencio.

In 2019, Matthews starred as Juana in season 2 of La peste (The Plague) set in bubonic plague ridden 16th century Seville. Matthews was a replacement for Cecilia Freire playing a main character of new teacher Carmen in season 2 of La otra mirada (A Different View) in 2019. Matthews had a short guest role as Sister Shannon Masters, the former 'Halo-bearer' in Warrior Nun in 2020.

== Non-acting ==
For many years, Matthews has been a presenter at the Sitges Film Festival, which is a film festival based in Catalonia specialising in fantasy and horror films. In 2017, Matthews was reported to be in a relationship with film actor and director Raúl Arévalo, whom she purportedly met while filming Negotiator in 2014.

== Filmography ==
=== Film ===
Key
†	Denotes films that have not yet been released

Year	Title	Role	Ref.
2007	Savage Grace	Lorna Moffat	
2008	Sing for Darfur	Isabelle	
2013	Mama	Mama (voice)	
2013	Panzer Chocolate	Julie Levinson	
2013	The Returned	Eve	
2014	Negociador (Negotiator)	Sophie	
2015	Don't Speak	Samantha	
2015	The Gunman	Cox's Secretary	
2016	Realive	Technician	
2016	Nick	Amber	
2016	Lucas	Jane Lipkiss	
2017	Rex	Lopez	
2017	El jugador de ajedrez (The Chess Player)	Marianne Latour	
2018	Silencio	Ana	
2018	My Masterpiece	Verdulera	
2018	XConfessions Web Series (video)	Olivia	
2019	El Cerro de los Dioses (The Hill of the Gods)	Melina Matthews	
2019	An Affair to Die For	Lydia Alan	
2020	Black Beach	Susan	
2021	Battle in Space: The Armada Attacks	Lt. Arsys	
2021	More the Merrier (formerly: Donde caben dos (Where two fit))	Belén	
2021	Official Competition	Directora de fotografía	
2022	Lucas	Jane Lipkiss	
2024	The Room Next Door	Lawyer	
2026	Crawlers †	TBA	

=== Television ===
Year	Title	Role	Notes
2005–2006	El Cor de la Ciutat (The Heart of the City)	Fadila Choukri	6 episodes
2011	Arròs covat	(voice)	Episode: "Arròs d'Arenys amb mostassa a la mel"
2013	Aída	—N/a	El imperio (de la morcilla) contraataca
2014–2015	The Refugees	Victoria	Episodes: "Sacrificio" and "El éxodo"
2015	Vis a vis (Locked Up)	Locutora	Episode: "La cruda realidad"
2015	Magnum Opus	Allie Berg	3 episodes
2015–2016	El Príncipe	Sophie	12 episodes
2016	Thirteen	Sofía Marín	4 episodes
2017	Playground	Laurence	10 episodes
2018	Fugitiva	Isabel Lafuente	7 episodes
2019	La peste (The Plague)	Juana	6 episodes
2019	La otra mirada (A Different View)	Carmen	8 episodes
2020–2022	Warrior Nun	Sister Shannon Masters	3 episodes
2021	Santuario	Valle	Podcast series; 12 episodes
2021	L'última nit del karaoke	Eli	3 episodes
2022	The Girls at the Back (Spanish: Las de la última fila)	Girl at the Back	1 episode
2022	Apagón	Marina	Episode: "Emergencia"
2023	A Town Called Malice	Lola	6 episodes
2023	Cristo y Rey	Mireilla Darc	Episode: "A un rey no se la deja"
2022–2023	Sentimos las molestias	Victoria	12 episodes
2025	Olympo	Jana Castro	6 episodes
2027	The Walking Dead: Daryl Dixon		
