= Camino a Arcadia =

- Genre: Drama
- Created by: Lidia Fraga; Jacobo Díaz
- Directed by: Jorge Saavedra
- Starring: William Levy; Paula Echevarría; Michelle Renaud
- Composer: Beatriz López-Nogales
- Country of origin: Spain
- Original language: Spanish
- No. of seasons: 1
- No. of episodes: 6

Production
- Executive producers: William Levy; Jeff Goldberg; David Martínez; Carlos Portela; Sergio Pizzolante
- Producers: Raúl Berdonés; Pablo Jimeno
- Production companies: Secuoya Studios; William Levy Entertainment

Original release
- Network: Vix
- Release: 8 August 2025

Camino a Arcadia is a Spanish drama television series created by Lidia Fraga and Jacobo Díaz. The series stars William Levy, Paula Echevarría and Michelle Renaud. It premiered on Vix on 8 August 2025.

== Cast ==
=== Main ===
- William Levy as Pablo / Mateo
- Paula Echevarría as Irene
- Michelle Renaud as Valeria
- Hernán Mendoza as Leonardo
- Jorge Motos as Bruno
- Alejandro Nones as Gael
- Raúl Peña as Ernesto
- Gerardo Taracena as Vidal
- Andrea Duro as Fayna
- Nico Galán as Damián
- Ana Jara as Naira

=== Recurring ===
- Sergio San as Ayoze
- Eva Camacho as Regina
- Silvia Naval as Judith
- Estibalitz Ruiz as Berta
- David Fleta as Sergio
- Nacho Guerreros as Marcos
- Javi Armas as Claudio

== Production ==
On 14 May 2024, it was announced that William Levy would executive produce and star in two projects for Vix, including Arcadia. Filming of the series began on 17 October 2024 in Tenerife.

== Release ==
The series premiered on Vix on 8 August 2025. SkyShowtime premiered the series for European countries on 10 November 2025 with its first three episodes, and then released the remaining three episodes weekly.
