= Cecilia Freire =

Spanish actress

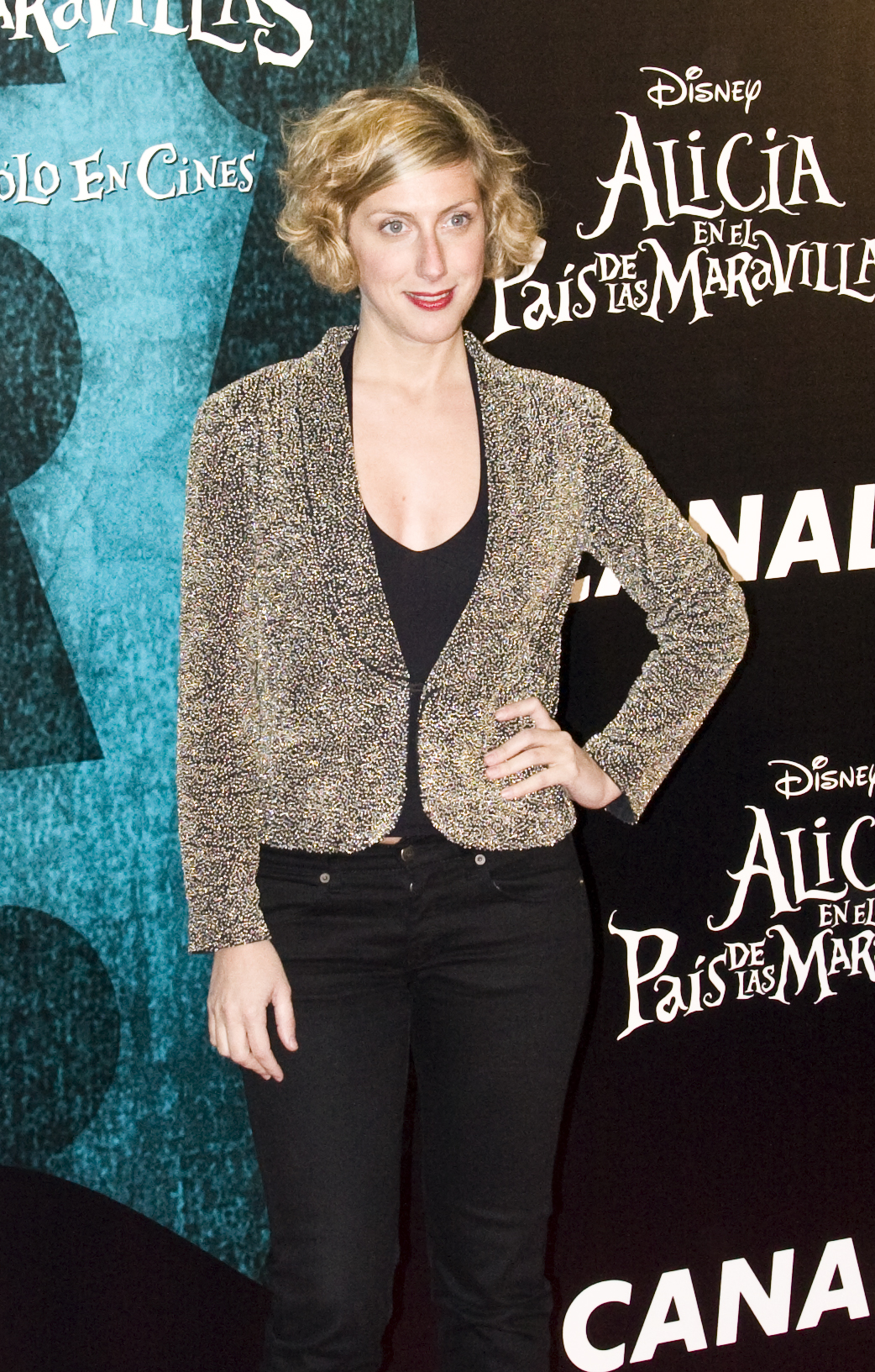
- Freire at the photocall of Alice in Wonderland Spanish première in 2010
- Born: Cecilia Freire Peñas; 17 November 1981 (age 44); Madrid, Spain
- Occupation: Actress
- Years active: 2001–present

Cecilia Freire Peñas (born 17 November 1981) is a Spanish actress. She is best known for playing Blanca Román on Física o Química (2008–2009) and Rita Montesinos on Velvet (2014–2016).

== Early life and education ==
Cecilia Freire Peñas was born on 17 November 1981 in Madrid, Spain.

== Career ==
Freire has worked as a film, theatre, and television actress. In 2008 she became popular for her role in the film Mortadelo and Filemon. Mission: Save the Planet. She has also appeared in films such as No Shame in 2001 and 8 citas in 2008.

In theatre, she has worked in London in The Winter's Tale, while in Spain she has been in plays such as La katarsis del tomatazo and Pero ¿quién mató el teatro?, in addition to having taken her first steps in shorts like La habitación de los abrigos by Nerea Madariaga.

In television, she appeared in La vida de Rita on La 1 (2003), on the Telecinco series Tirando a dar (2006), which was not very successful, and played Setefilla on Hospital Central on Telecinco (2007).

From 2008 to 2009, she was part of the Antena 3 series Física o Química in the role of Blanca, the Zurbarán Institute's literature professor, which made her known to the general public. She was one of its veterans, with a character who was always very prominent in stories, but left the series to focus on her theatrical career, having already been successful in the play Luz de gas.

In 2010, she starred in Impares Premium and appeared in the short film Perra. In 2011 she shot another short, Aunque todo vaya mal, the directing debut of the actress Cristina Alcázar, who had joined Física o Química to play Marina, the new philosophy professor, just after Freire left.

In 2012, she performed in El club de la comedia on laSexta as a monologist.

From 2014 to 2016 she played Rita Montesinos in the Antena 3 series Velvet. Rita is a seamstress in the Galleries, who along with her friends Ana (Paula Echevarría) and Luisa (Manuela Vellés) and her sister Clara (Marta Hazas) are known as the "Velvet girls". Freire appeared in the first four seasons of the series. In October 2016 she won Best Female Performer at the 63rd edition of the Ondas Awards for her role as Rita Montesinos.

In November 2016 she played Inma in the film Don't Blame the Karma for Being an Idiot, a comedy directed by Maria Ripoll based on Laura Norton's homonymous novel.

Since 2018 she has starred in the TVE series La otra mirada, where she shares the screen with actresses such as Macarena García, Patricia López Arnaiz, and Ana Wagener.

== Filmography ==
=== Movies ===
Year	Movie	Character	Director
2001	No Shame	Lara	Joaquín Oristrell
2005	La habitación de los abrigos	Clara	Nerea Madariaga
2007	Sobre las sábanas	Her	Iván Cerdán Bermúdez
2008	Mortadelo and Filemon. Mission: Save the Planet	CNN correspondent	Miguel Bardem
2008	8 citas	Nuria	Rodrigo Sorogoyen and Peris Romano
2011	rara		
2011	Aunque todo vaya mal	Emilia	Cristina Alcázar
2012	Perra		Lola Parra
2013	Solsticio	Helena	Juan Francisco Viruega
2013	Dragons High School		Lola Parra
2014	El iluso	Actress	Rodrigo Sorogoyen
2015	Los Cárpatos	Carolina	Daniel Remón
2016	Don't Blame the Karma for Being an Idiot	Inma	María Ripoll
2017	Revolution	Thais	David Sousa Moreau
2019	El Cumple	Paula	Pablo Alén and Breixo Corral
2020	Las grietas	Carmen	Valentino R. Sandoli

=== Television ===
Year	Title	Character	Channel	Notes
2003	La vida de Rita		La 1	13 episodes
2006	Tirando a dar	Violeta	Telecinco	7 episodes
2007	Hospital Central	Setefilla	Telecinco	1 episode
2008	Impares	Lola	Antena 3	13 episodes
2008-2011	Física o Química	Blanca Román Hernández	Antena 3	48 episodes
2010	Impares Premium	Lola	Neox	10 episodes
2014-2016	Velvet	Margarita "Rita" Montesinos Martín de Infantes	Antena 3	55 episodes
2015	Birlokus klub		Telecinco	1 episode
2018-2019	La otra mirada	Ángela López Castaño	La 1	15 episodes
2019	Velvet Colección	Margarita "Rita" Montesinos Martín de Infantes	Movistar+	1 episode
2019-2020	Justo antes de Cristo	Valeria	Movistar+	11 episodes

== Awards and nominations ==
Year	Award	Category	Work	Result	Ref.
2014	Silver Fotogramas Awards	Best Television Actress	Velvet	Nominated	
2015	Actors Union Awards	Best Supporting Television Actress	Velvet	Nominated	
2016	Feroz Awards	Best Supporting Television Actress	Velvet	Nominated	
2016	Ondas Awards	Best Female Performer in National Fiction	Velvet	Winner	
2016	Silver Fotogramas Awards	Best Television Actress	Velvet	Nominated	
