= Goyo Jiménez =

Spanish actor and comedian

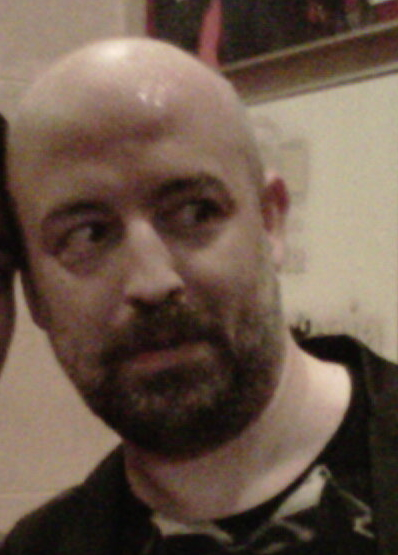
Goyo Jimenez

Gregorio Jiménez Tornero, known professionally as Goyo Jiménez (born January 31, 1970), is a Spanish actor, screenwriter and humorist known for his stand-up comedy performances.

== Life ==
He spent his childhood in Albacete and studied law at the University of Castilla–La Mancha and theatre at the RESAD.

He started as an actor when he was a teenager in local companies, his own company or theatre companies like La Fura dels Baus, Teatro Capitano or Teatro Fénix.

== Filmography ==
- Clara no es nombre de mujer (2010)
- Torrente 4: Lethal Crisis (Crisis Letal) (2011)
- El pregón (2016)

=== TV ===
- El club de la comedia (1999, 2011)
- Nuevos cómicos (2000)
- Esto no es serio (2001)
- La hora chanante (2002)
- UHF (2004)
- 59 segundos (2004)
- Splunge (2005)
- Zulú bingo (2005)
- El club de Flo (2006-2007)
- Tres en raya (2006)
- Los irrepetibles (2006-2007)
- 9 de cada 10 (2008)
- Espejo público (2008)
- La hora de José Mota (2009-2010)
- Pánico en el plató (2010)
- Con hache de Eva (2011)
- Psicodriving (2012-2013)
- Se hace saber (2013-2014)
- Zapeando (2014-2015)
- Órbita Laika (2016-2019)
- Samanta y... (2017)
- Código final (2018-2019)
- Tu cara me suena (2025)
