= A Different View =

Spanish television series

- Spanish: La otra mirada
- Genre: Period drama
- Created by: Josep Cister; Jaime Vaca
- Directed by: Luis Santamaría; Fernando González Molina; Mar Olid; Miguel del Arco; Pablo Guerrero; Carlos Navarro
- Starring: Macarena García; Patricia López Arnaiz; Ana Wagener; Cecilia Freire; Melina Matthews; Begoña Vargas; Lucía Díez; Carla Campra; Elena Gallardo; Paula de la Nieta; Abril Montilla; Dariam Coco
- Country of origin: Spain
- Original language: Spanish
- No. of seasons: 2
- No. of episodes: 21 (list of episodes)

Production
- Executive producers: María Roy; Pablo Guerrero; Josep Cister Rubio; Aitor Montánchez; Luis Santamaría
- Production companies: RTVE; Boomerang TV

Original release
- Network: La 1
- Release: 25 April 2018 – 15 July 2019

A Different View (Spanish: La otra mirada) is a Spanish dramatic television series created by Josep Cister and Jaime Vaca and starring Macarena García, Patricia López Arnaiz, Ana Wagener, Cecilia Freire, and others. The show is set in 1920s Seville and deals with feminist issues. The two seasons of the show originally aired from 25 April 2018 to 15 July 2019 on La 1.

== Plot ==
The show is set in an academy for young women in Seville in the 1920s. A Different View showcases a teaching center clinging to an unusual way of doing things and conditioned by the traditions of the city and those years. This world and its pillars wobble with the arrival of a new teacher who has a very different way of seeing things. She also has a secret objective directly related to the academy. The search for their own voices among the group of adult and young women is among the goals of the protagonists.

== Topics covered ==
Set in 1920s Seville, the series explores social and political themes of both historical and contemporary relevance, with each episode centering on specific feminist topics. Topics addressed include historical milestones in women's education such as the legacy of pioneer Elena Maseras, as well as the evolution of female educators and the role of women in sports.

Additionally, the storyline examines collective feminist movements, female solidarity, and the importance of autonomous female narratives. The series also engages with feminist art history, including analysis of Francisco de Goya's El pelele, alongside broader discussions on female sexual autonomy, mental health, and anti-racism.

== Cast and characters ==
=== First season (2018) ===
==== Main cast ====
- Macarena García - Manuela Martín Casado
- Patricia López Arnaiz - Teresa Blanco Sánchez
- Ana Wagener - Luisa Fernández Mayoral
- Cecilia Freire - Ángela López Castaño

==== Secondary cast ====
- Gloria Muñoz - Doña Manuela Casado García (Episode 1 - Episode 5, Episode 7 - Episode 8, Episode 11, Episode 13)
- Carlos Olalla - Don Pascual Martín (Episode 1 - Episode 4, Episode 7 - Episode 8, Episode 13)
- Begoña Vargas - Roberta Luna Miñambres
- Lucía Díez - Margarita Ortega-Sánchez Camaño y López de Carrizosa
- Carla Campra - Flavia Cardesa González
- Paula de la Nieta - Macarena Panduro Alén
- Abril Montilla - María Jesús Junio Crespo
- Elena Gallardo - Candela Megía Rodas
- Juanlu González - Ramón
- Álvaro Mel - Tomás Peralta García de Blas (Episode 1 - Episode 5, Episode 7 - Episode 13)
- Pepa Gracia - Paula Alén (Episode 3, Episode 5, Episode 7, Episode 9, Episode 12 - Episode 13)
- Jordi Coll - Martín Arteaga Gómez-Berzosa (Episode 3 - Episode 4, Episode 7 - Episode 8, Episode 11 - Episode 13)
- Alejandro Sigüenza - David (Episode 3, Episode 5, Episode 9, Episode 11 - Episode 13)
- José Pastor - Rafael "Rafita" Peralta García de Blas (Episode 1 - Episode 4, Episode 7 - Episode 8)
- José Luis Barquero - Álvaro Peralta García de Blas (Episode 1 - Episode 4, Episode 7 - Episode 8)
- Celia Freijeiro - María Antonia Miñambres (Episode 5 - Episode 6, Episode 8, Episode 13)
- Filipe Duarte - Vanildo "Nildo" Zacarías de Azevedo (Episode 1 - Episode 6, Episode 13)

==== Episodic cast ====
- José Emilio Vera - José Francisco Luna, father of Roberta (Episode 5 - Episode 6, Episode 8, Episode 13)
- Pilar Cano - Susana González, mother of Flavia (Episode 5, Episode 7 - Episode 8, Episode 13)
- Ignacio Rosado - Father of Flavia (Episode 5, Episode 7 - Episode 8, Episode 13)
- Raúl Ferrando - Enrique Hidalgo (Episode 5, Episode 7, Episode 9, Episode 12 - Episode 13)
- Álvaro Sanz (Episode 3, Episode 9, Episode 12 - Episode 13)
- Rodrigo Sanmartín (Episode 3, Episode 9, Episode 12 - Episode 13)
- Gonzalo Casado (Episode 3, Episode 9, Episode 12 - Episode 13)
- José Luis Casado (Episode 3, Episode 9, Episode12 - Episode 13)
- Ismael Martínez (Episode 3, Episode 9, Episode 12 - Episode 13)
- Manuel Domínguez (Episode 13)
- David Pavón (Episode 12)
- María Rivero (Episode 11)
- Paco Mora - Arcadio Pérez Fernández (Episode 2, Episode 4, Episode 6, Episode 10)
- Marcelo Casas (Episode 10)
- Carolina García Herrera - Alicia Megía Rodas, sister of Candela (Episode 9)
- Nico Montoya (Episode 9)
- José Luis Rasero (Episode 9)
- Javier Mora - Don Rafael Peralta (Episode 4 - Episode 5, Episode 7 - Episode 8)
- Alberto González - Juez Fernando Lara Fandiño (Episode 8)
- Marco Cáceres - Diego, helper of Ramón (Episode 8)
- Gonzalo Molina (Episode 8)
- Mercedes Arbizu - María de Maeztu (Episode 7)
- Juan Carlos Villanueva - Father ofTeresa Blanco (Episode 1, Episode 5 - Episode 6)
- Alberto Bejarano (Episode 5 - Episode 6)
- Cristina Sánchez-Cava - Rocío, secretary of Fábrica Peralta (Episode 6)
- Elia Navaroa (Episode 4)
- Mariví Carrillo (Episode 4)
- Andrés Bernal (Episode 3)
- Ángel Saavedra (Episode 3)
- Antonio Reyes (Episode 2)
- Olga Rodríguez (Episode 2)
- Antonio Gómiz (Episode 2)
- Alonso Bernal (Episode 2)
- Pablo James Pacheco Hendry (Episode 2)
- Fernando Cueto (Episode 1)
- Eduardo Cervera (Episode 1)
- Irene Moral (Episode 1)
- Joao Compasso (Episode1)

=== Second season (2019) ===
==== Main cast ====
- Macarena García - Manuela Martín Casado
- Patricia López Arnaiz - Teresa Blanco Sánchez
- Ana Wagener - Luisa Fernández Mayoral
- Melina Matthews - Carmen Lara

==== Secondary cast ====
- Carla Campra - Flavia Cardesa González
- Lucía Díez - Margarita Ortega-Sánchez Camaño y López de Carrizosa
- Begoña Vargas - Roberta Luna Miñambres
- Abril Montilla - María Jesús Junio Crespo
- Paula de la Nieta - Macarena Panduro Alén
- Elena Gallardo - Candela Megía Rodas
- Dariam Coco - Inés
- Gloria Muñoz - Doña Manuela Casado García (Episode 14/1, Episode 16/3 - Episode 21/8)
- Jordi Coll - Martín Arteaga Gómez-Berzosa (Episodio 14/1, Episode 16/3 - Episode 19/6, Episode 21/8)
- Álvaro Mel - Tomás Peralta García de Blas
- Juanlu González - Ramón
- Javier Mora - Don Rafael Peralta (Episode 14/1 - Episode 15/2, Episode 17/4, Episode 19/6 - Episode 21/8)
- César Vicente - Elías
- José Pastor - Rafael "Rafita" Peralta García de Blas (Episode 15/2 - Episode 19/6, Episode 21/8)
- José Luis Barquero - Álvaro Peralta García de Blas (Episode 15/2 - Episode 16/3, Episode 21/8)
- Carlos Olalla - Don Pascual Martín (Episode 17/4 - Episode 20/7)
- Paco Mora - Arcadio Pérez Fernández (Episode 20/7)
- Raúl Ferrando - Enrique Hidalgo (Episode 15/2, Episode 17/4 - Episode 20/7)
- Cecilia Freire - Ángela López Castaño (Episode 14/1, Episode 19/6)
- Pepa Gracia - Paula Alén (Episode 19/6)
- Javier Ambrossi - Benito Padilla (Episode 16/3)
- Javier Calvo - Jorge Merlot (Episode 16/3)
- Joaquín Notario - Vicente Martínez (Episode 14/1 - Episode 16/3, Episode 18/5; Episode 20/7 - Episode 21/8)
- Celia Freijeiro - María Antonia Miñambres (Episode 14/1, Episode 17/4)

==== Episodic cast ====
- Oti Manzano - Dolores (Episode 21/8)
- Elías Pelayo (Episode 21/8)
- Antonio Cantos (Episode 21/8)
- Silvia Aranda - Wife of Rafael Peralta (Episode 21/8)
- Carlos Navarro (Episode 21/8)
- Daniela Saludes - Catalina (Episode 20/7)
- Diego Godoy (Episode 20/7)
- Luis Fernando Alvés - Pedro Muniesa (Episode 19/6)
- Óscar Ortuño - Student of Madrid (Episode 19/6)
- Iván Sánchez - Sergio (Episode 19/6)
- Mª Ángeles Gómez (Episode 18/5)
- Ignacio Rosado - Father of Flavia (Episode 18/5)
- Nicolás Montoya - Mate of Vicente (Episode 15/2, Episode 18/5)
- Olga Lozano (Episode 18/5)
- Jesús Agudo - Lover of Manuela (Episode 18/5)
- Marta Ansino - María (Episode 18/5)
- Miriam Serrano (Episode 18/5)
- Alberto Reina (Episode 18/5)
- Vicente Vergara (Episode 17/4)
- Mauricio Bautista (Episode 17/4)
- Omar Zaragoza - Fidel (Episode 16/3)
- Rodrigo San Pedro (Episode 16/3)
- Paloma Mariscal (Episode 16/3)
- Aitor Sánchez (Episode 16/3)
- Antonio Márquez (Episode14/1)
- Candela Fernández - Nieves (Episode 14/1)
- Juan Navas (Episode 14/1)
- Rafa Tubio (Episode 14/1)
- Luis Hens (Episode14/1)
- Pedro López (Episode 14/1)
- Francisco José Arcona (Episode 14/1)

== Production and release ==
Created by Josep Cister and Jaime Vaca, La otra mirada was produced by RTVE in collaboration with Boomerang TV. It was known as Alma Mater during pre-production. The episodes of season 1 were directed by Luis Santamaría, Mar Olid, Fernando González Molina, Miguel del Arco and Pablo Guerrero. Shooting locations included Seville, Madrid, Guadalajara and Toledo.

Although the series' premiere was scheduled for the northern hemisphere in the Summer of 2018, Televisión Española (TVE) decided to release it on 25 April. The last episode aired on 25 July 2018. The season averaged a 9.0% audience share and 1,418,000 viewers.

By October 2018, RTVE decided to renew the series for a second and a final season of 8 episodes. Audience ratings were unimpressive, but the series earned critical acclaim.

Melina Matthews and Dariam Coco, as well as Joaquín Notario and César Vicente, joined the cast for the new season. Credited directors in season 2 included Luis Santamaría, Pablo Guerrero, and Carlos Navarro, whereas the writing team was formed by Alba Lucio, Irene Rodríguez, Ana Muñiz da Cunha, and Tatiana Rodríguez. The broadcasting run spanned from 27 May 2019 to 15 July 2019.

RTVE reached agreements with platforms such as IVI and Walter Presents to broadcast the series in international markets. The series premiered in Vietnam on 25 April 2023 on VTV3 as Vượt lên định kiến.

Series	Episodes	Originally released			Viewers	Share (%)	Ref.
Series	Episodes	First released	Last released	Network	Viewers	Share (%)	Ref.
1	13	25 April 2018	25 July 2018	tve	1,418,000	9.0	
S	1	13 June 2018	13 June 2018	tve	1,321,000	7.8	
2	8	27 May 2019	15 July 2019	tve	1,362,000	9.2	

=== Season 1 (2018) ===
This is a caption
No. overall	No. in season	Title	Directed by	Written by	Viewers	Original release date	Share (%)
1	1	"Tabaco, pantalones y jazz"	Luis Santamaría	Jaime López & María López Castaño	1,620,000	25 April 2018	9.6
2	2	"Un voto de confianza"	Pablo Guerrero	María López Castaño & Alberto Manzano Ruiz	1,674,000	2 May 2018	10.1
3	3	"Retratos en tonos pastel"	Fernando González Molina	Alba Lucio	1,750,000	9 May 2018	10.7
4	4	"Derecho a la intimidad"	Pablo Guerrero	Mario Parra	1,698,000	16 May 2018	10.4
5	5	"La vida que quiero vivir"	Luis Santamaría	María López Castaño & Alberto Manzano	1,376,000	23 May 2018	8.0
6	6	"Una segunda oportunidad"	Pablo Guerrero	Alba Lucio	1,342,000	30 May 2018	7.8
7	7	"Pienso en mí"	Mar Olid	Mario Parra	1,353,000	6 June 2018	7.8
8	8	"La primera y la última palabra"	Luis Santamaría	María López Castaño	1,575,000	20 June 2018	9.9
9	9	"Viacrucis"	Pablo Guerrero	Alba Lucio	1,326,000	27 June 2018	8.6
10	10	"Déjalo ir"	Mar Olid	Mario Parra	1,168,000	4 July 2018	7.9
11	11	"El espejo en el que me miro"	Pablo Guerrero	Mario Parra & Jaime Vaca	1,180,000	11 July 2018	7.9
12	12	"Ser mujer"	Mar Olid	Alba Lucio	1,108,000	18 July 2018	8.1
13	13	"Alma máter"	Luis Santamaría	Jaime Vaca & María López Castaño	1,265,000	25 July 2018	9.9

=== Season 2 (2019) ===
This is a caption
No. overall	No. in season	Title	Directed by	Written by	Viewers	Original release date	Share (%)
14	1	"Miedo al otro"	Luis Santamaría	Alba Lucio & Irene Rodríguez	1,611,000	27 May 2019	10.4
15	2	"Lo que espero de mí"	Pablo Guerrero	Tatiana Rodríguez	1,571,000	3 June 2019	10.2
16	3	"Vuestra historia"	Pablo Guerrero	Ana Muniz da Cunha	1,561,000	10 June 2019	10.1
17	4	"Mujeres olvidadas"	Carlos Navarro Ballesteros	Irene Rodríguez	1,358,000	17 June 2019	9.0
18	5	"Baile de máscaras"	Carlos Navarro Ballesteros	Ana Muniz da Cunha	1,447,000	24 June 2019	9.8
19	6	"Tengo un sueño"	Pablo Guerrero	Alba Lucio & Tatiana Rodríguez	1,174,000	1 July 2019	8.5
20	7	"No hay fracaso"	Carlos Navarro Ballesteros	Tatiana Rodríguez & Ana Muniz da Cunha	998,000	8 July 2019	6.6
21	8	"Desde dentro"	Carlos Navarro Ballesteros & Pablo Guerrero	Alba Lucio & Irene Rodríguez	1,178,000	15 July 2019	8.8

== Awards and nominations ==
Year	Award	Category	Nominee(s)	Result	Ref.
2018	20th Iris Awards	Best Production	Josep Cister, Aitor Montánchez, Luis Santamaría and Mª Ángeles Caballero	Nominated	
2018	20th Iris Awards	Best Actress	Patricia López Arnaiz	Nominated	
2018	6th MiM Series Awards	Best Drama Series		Won	
2018	6th MiM Series Awards	Best Screenplay	María López Castaño, Alba Lucio Calderón, Mario Parra Ortiz, Josep Cister and Jaime Vaca	Nominated	
2018	6th MiM Series Awards	Best Actress	Macarena García	Nominated	
