= Dani de la Orden =

Spanish film and television director

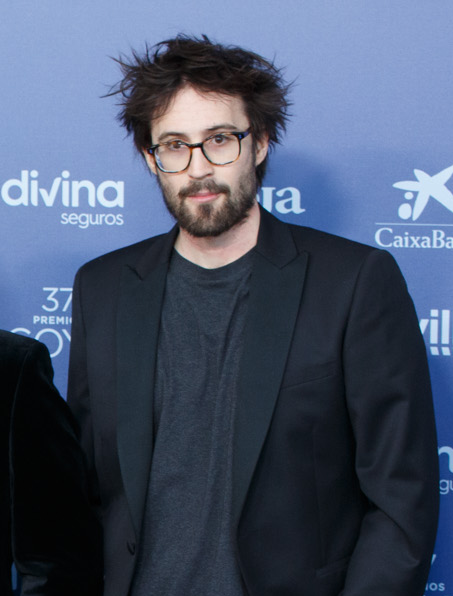
- De la Orden in 2023
- Born: 2 June 1989 (age 36); Barcelona, Catalonia, Spain
- Occupations: Film director, television director

Dani de la Orden (born 2 June 1989) is a Spanish film and television director.

== Biography ==
Dani de la Orden was born on 2 June 1989 in Barcelona. An avid consumer of cinema since he was very young, he started making short films alongside his grandmother. He earned a degree in direction from the ESCAC. Shortly after graduating he directed his debut feature, Barcelona Summer Night (2013), which sparked off a sequel, Barcelona Christmas Night (2015). They were followed by the mainstream comedies El pregón and The Best Summer of my Life.

A prolific film director, he had already shot 8 feature films—all comedies—at age 32. A recurring theme in his films is male immaturity. He has also directed episodes of television series Boca Norte and Elite. He published his first novel, Darse un tiempo (y otras mentiras), in 2021.

== Director ==
Feature films

- 2013 — Barcelona, nit d'estiu (Barcelona Summer Night)
- 2015 — Barcelona, nit d'hivern (Barcelona Christmas Night)
- 2016 — El pregón
- 2018 — El mejor verano de mi vida (The Best Summer of My Life)
- 2019 — Litus
- 2020 — Hasta que la boda nos separe (The Wedding Unplanner)
- 2021 — Loco por ella (Crazy About Her)
- 2021 — Mamá o papá (You Keep the Kids!)
- 2022 — El test (The Te$t)
- 2022 — 42 segundos (The Final Game)
- 2024 — Casa en flames (A House on Fire)
- 2026 — El director

Television

- Since 2018 — Élite (Elite)
- 2019 — Boca Norte
- 2025 — A muerte (Love You to Death)
