= El pregón =

- Film poster
- Directed by: Dani de la Orden
- Screenplay by: Daniel González; David Serrano
- Story by: Diego San José
- Produced by: Andreu Buenafuente; Berto Romero; Mikel Lejarza; Mercedes Gamero
- Starring: Berto Romero; Andreu Buenafuente; Belén Cuesta; Jorge Sanz; Goyo Jiménez
- Cinematography: Isaac Vila
- Edited by: Alberto Gutiérrez
- Music by: The Pinker Tones
- Production companies: El Terrat; Atresmedia Cine
- Distributed by: DeAPlaneta
- Release date: 18 March 2016
- Country: Spain
- Language: Spanish

El pregón is a 2016 Spanish comedy film directed by Dani de la Orden from a screenplay by Daniel González and David Serrano which stars Berto Romero, Andreu Buenafuente, Belén Cuesta, Jorge Sanz, and Goyo Jiménez.

== Plot ==
After hitting rock bottom, the Osorio brothers (formerly successful electronic music artists) are hired by the mayor of their native village of Proverzo, teaming up again to declaim the local festival's pregón announcement.

== Cast ==
- Andreu Buenafuente as Juan
- Berto Romero as Richi
- Belén Cuesta as Silvia
- Goyo Jiménez as Francisco
- Jorge Sanz as Alcalde

== Production ==
The screenplay was penned by Daniel González and David Serrano based on an original story by Diego San José. The film is an Atresmedia Cine and El Terrat production with backing from ICEC, Movistar, and TV3. Shooting locations included Barcelona, Sant Pere de Ribes, Sitges, and Santa Pau.

== Release ==
Distributed by DeAPlaneta, it was released theatrically in Spain on 18 March 2016, making over €1.5 million at the domestic box-office during the first thirteen days of its theatrical run.

== Reception ==
Beatriz Martínez of El Periódico de Catalunya rated the film 1 out of 5 stars, assessing that the film sets the clock back 50 years.

Fausto Fernández of Fotogramas rated the film 3 out of 5 stars, mentioning the leading couple as a positive element about the film.

== See also ==
- List of Spanish films of 2016
