= Pequeñas coincidencias =

Spanish TV series

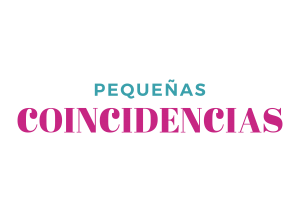
- Genre: Romantic comedy
- Created by: Javier Veiga
- Starring: Marta Hazas; Javier Veiga
- Country of origin: Spain
- Original language: Spanish
- No. of seasons: 3
- No. of episodes: 30

Production
- Production companies: Amazon Prime Video; Atresmedia Studio; Onza Entertainment; MedioLimón

Original release
- Network: Amazon Prime Video
- Release: 7 December 2018 – 5 February 2021

Pequeñas coincidencias (lit. 'Little Coincidences') is a Spanish romantic comedy television series created by Javier Veiga starring Marta Hazas and Veiga himself. Its three seasons were released on Amazon Prime Video between 2018 and 2021.

== Premise ==
The fiction focuses on the ups and downs of the relationship between Javi (Javier Veiga) and Marta (Marta Hazas).

== Cast ==
- Marta Hazas as Marta Valdivia.
- Javier Veiga as Javier Rubirosa.
- Mariano Peña as Joaquín.
- Juan Ibáñez as Nacho.
- Alicia Rubio as Elisa.
- Marta Castellote as Carla.
- Alosian Vivancos as Diego.
- Juan López-Tagle as Giovanni.
- Lucía Balas as Niña.
- Álvaro Balas as Niño.
- Unax Ugalde as Mario.
- Xosé Antonio Touriñán as Rafa.
- Tomás Pozzi as David.
- José Troncoso as Josemi.

== Production and release ==
Created by Javier Veiga, the series was produced by Amazon Prime Video together with Atresmedia Studio, Onza Entertainment and MedioLimón. Together with Veiga, the scriptwriting team of the first season was formed by Marta G. De Vega, Abraham Sastre, María Miranda, Germán Aparicio, Alonso Laporta, Daniel Monedero, Jorge López, Gerald Fillmore and Cristina Pons. It was shot on location in Madrid. Veiga, Mario Montero and Miguel Conde directed the episodes of the first season. The first season of Pequeñas coincidencias, consisting of 8 episodes featuring a running time of around 50 minutes, premiered on 7 December 2018 on Amazon Prime Video. The series began its free-to-air broadcasting run on Antena 3 on 2 September 2019. Amazon Prime Video simultaneously released the second season in Spain, Latin America and the United States on 15 January 2020. It consisted of 12 episodes with a running time of 25–30minutes. Comprising 10 episodes, the third and final season was released on 5 February 2021 on Prime Video. NBC purchased the rights to produce an American remake, tentatively titled Someone Out There, whose production was put in hold by the COVID-19 pandemic.

Series	Episodes	Originally released	Network
1	8	7 December 2018	Amazon Prime Video
2	12	15 January 2020	Amazon Prime Video
3	10	5 February 2021	Amazon Prime Video

== Awards and nominations ==
Year	Award	Category	Nominee(s)	Result	Ref.
2019	7th MiM Series Awards		Best Comedy Series	Nominated	
2021?	23rd Iris Awards	Best Actor	Javier Veiga	Pending	
