= Justo antes de Cristo =

Spanish TV series

- Genre: Comedy; Historical
- Created by: Juan Maidagán; Pepón Montero
- Directed by: Borja Cobeaga; Nacho Vigalondo
- Country of origin: Spain
- Original language: Spanish
- No. of seasons: 2
- No. of episodes: 12

Production
- Running time: 25 min (approx.)
- Production company: Movistar+

Original release
- Network: Movistar+
- Release: 5 April 2019 – 13 March 2020

Justo antes de Cristo (lit. 'Just Before Christ') is a Spanish comedy television series set in Ancient Rome created by Juan Maidagán and Pepón Montero for Movistar+. Its two seasons were released in 2019 and 2020, respectively.

== Premise ==
Set in Ancient Rome, the fiction starts in 31 BC. Manio Sempronio Galba's death sentence is commuted by a service in the Roman legion, destined to the hostile and exotic Thrace.

== Cast ==
- Julián López as Manio Sempronio Galba.
- Xosé Touriñán as Agorastocles.
- Cecilia Freire as Valeria.
- César Sarachu as Cneo Valerio Áquila.
- Eduardo Antuña as Antonino.
- Manolo Solo as Gabinio.
- Marta Fernández-Muro as Domicia.
- Priscilla Delgado as Ática.
- Javier Botet as Silvio.
- Aníbal Gómez as Corbulón.
- Eduardo Antuña as Antonino.
- Fernando Cayo as Cornelio Pisón.

== Production ==
Created by Juan Maidagán and Pepón Montero, the episodes were directed by Borja Cobeaga and Nacho Vigalondo. The first two seasons were shot at once. The main shooting location was a set located in Polígono Cobo Calleja in Fuenlabrada. The Sierra de Guadarrama and the province of Guadalajara served as outdoor locations in order to represent Thrace. The first season (consisting of 6 episodes with a running time of around 25 minutes) was released on 5 April 2019. The second season (also consisting of 6 episodes of roughly 25 minutes), was released on 13 March 2020.

Series	Episodes	Originally released	Network
1	6	5 April 2019	Movistar+
2	6	13 March 2020	Movistar+

== Awards and nominations ==
Year	Award	Category	Nominee(s)	Result	Ref.
2019	7th MiM Series Awards	Best Comedy Actor	Julián López	Nominated	
