= Litus =

- Film poster
- Directed by: Dani de la Orden
- Screenplay by: Marta Buchaca
- Based on: Litus by Marta Buchaca
- Produced by: Eduardo Campoy; Raúl Berdonés; Adolfo Blanco
- Starring: Belén Cuesta; Adrián Lastra; Álex García; Quim Gutiérrez; Miquel Fernández; Marta Nieto
- Cinematography: José Luis Bernal
- Edited by: Alberto Gutiérrez
- Music by: Dani Trujillo
- Production companies: Álamo Producciones Audiovisuales; A Contracorriente Films; Neón Producciones; Litus Audiovisual AIE
- Distributed by: A Contracorriente Films
- Release dates: 18 March 2019 (Málaga); 13 September 2019 (Spain)
- Country: Spain
- Language: Spanish

Litus is a 2019 Spanish comedy-drama film directed by Dani de la Orden based on the stage play by Marta Buchaca. It stars Belén Cuesta, Adrián Lastra, Álex García, Quim Gutiérrez, Miquel Fernández, and Marta Nieto.

== Plot ==
Time after the suicide of Litus, his brother Toni gathers a number of acquaintances, including Litus' girlfriend Laia, best friend Pablo, and musical partner Pepe, with their innermost secrets and emotions thereby coming to surface.

== Cast ==
- Belén Cuesta as Laia
- Adrián Lastra as Marcos
- Álex García as Pablo
- Quim Gutiérrez as Toni
- Miquel Fernández as Pepe
- Marta Nieto as Su

== Production ==
The film is an Álamo Producciones Audiovisuales, A Contracorriente Films, Neón Producciones, and Litus Audiovisual AIE production.

== Release ==
The film was presented at the 22nd Málaga Film Festival in March 2019. Distributed by A Contracorriente Films, Litus was released theatrically in Spain on 13 September 2019.

== Reception ==
According to the review aggregation website Rotten Tomatoes, Litus has a 71% approval rating based on 7 reviews from critics, with an average rating of 5.7/10.

Beatriz Martínez of Fotogramas rated the film 3 out of 5 stars, highlighting "a cohesive cast that avoids the theatrical heritage of the story" as the best thing about the film while negatively citing a "somewhat self-indulgent last segment".

Rubén Romero Santos of Cinemanía rated the film 1½ stars, deeming it to be an affected adaptation, writing that "the viewer gets lost in this Catalan bourgeois atmosphere condensed in the Casa Tarradellas and Estrella Damm commercials".

Javier Ocaña of El País assessed that even if the "well adjusted in its length and with notable performances" film "may feel [already] seen and heard, "the average level in all its sections is appreciable".

== Accolades ==
Year	Award	Category	Nominee(s)	Result	Ref.
2019	22nd Málaga Film Festival	Silver Biznaga for Best Supporting Actor	Quim Gutiérrez	Won	
2020	7th Feroz Awards	Best Comedy Film		Nominated	

== See also ==
- List of Spanish films of 2019
