= The Wedding Unplanner =

- Theatrical release poster
- Spanish: Hasta que la boda nos separe
- Directed by: Dani de la Orden
- Screenplay by: Olatz Arroyo; Marta Sánchez; Eric Navarro
- Based on: Jour J by Stéphane Kazandjian and Reem Kherici
- Produced by: Mercedes Gamero; Mikel Lejarza; Eduardo Campoy
- Starring: Belén Cuesta; Álex García; Silvia Alonso; Adrián Lastra; Antonio Dechent; Gracia Olayo; Mariam Hernández; Salva Reina; Leo Harlem
- Production companies: Atresmedia Cine; Álamo Producciones Audiovisuales
- Distributed by: A Contracorriente Films
- Release dates: 6 February 2020 (Paterna); 14 February 2020 (Spain)
- Country: Spain
- Language: Spanish

The Wedding Unplanner (Spanish: Hasta que la boda nos separe; transl. 'Until Wedding Do Us Part') is a 2020 Spanish comedy film directed by Dani de la Orden consisting of a remake of the 2017 French film Jour J. It stars Belén Cuesta, Álex García and Silvia Alonso alongside Adrián Lastra, Antonio Dechent, Gracia Olayo, Mariam Hernández, Salva Reina and Leo Harlem.

== Plot ==
Marina (a wedding planner free from commitments) has a one-night stand with Carlos (in a relationship with Alexia). Upon finding a business card belonging to Marina among Carlos' stuff, Alexia interprets it as a marriage proposal, and so the couple eventually hires Marina (who turns out to be an Alexia's childhood acquaintance) as a planner for their wedding.

== Cast ==
- Belén Cuesta as Marina
- Álex García as Carlos
- Silvia Alonso as Alexia
- Adrián Lastra as Ben
- Antonio Dechent as Arturo
- Gracia Olayo as Lourdes
- Mariam Hernández as Irene
- Salva Reina as Capitán
- Leo Harlem as Don Emilio
- Antonio Resines as Padre de la novia
- Malena Alterio as Chef
- Ernesto Sevilla as Padre Marina
- Juana Cordero as Sor Tomasa

== Production ==
An adaptation of the 2017 French film Jour J, the screenplay was penned by Olatz Arroyo, Marta Sánchez and Eric Navarro. An Atresmedia Cine and Álamo Producciones Audiovisuales production, the film had the participation of Movistar+ and Orange. It was shot in between Tenerife and Madrid. Eduardo Campoy, Mercedes Gamero, and Mikel Lejarza took over production duties.

== Release ==
The film was pre-screened on 6 February 2020 in Paterna. Distributed by A Contracorriente Films, it was theatrically released in Spain on 14 February 2020. The film had some time for its theatrical window before the COVID-19 pandemic disruption gave way to a complete closure of Spanish theatres on 13 March 2020, becoming the fourth highest-grossing Spanish film in 2020, with circa €2.7 million (over 452,000 admissions).

== Reception ==
Javier Ocaña of El País wrote that the film, which he considered to be superior to the French original, is "in principle, a good comedy", but that by and large it had already been made "very recently" and next door, considering that the remake trend "may make all the commercial sense in the world. But from an artistic standpoint it is disappointing".

Manu Piñón of Fotogramas rated the film 3 out of 5 stars, highlighting Cuesta and García's comedy performances as the best thing about the film.

Beatriz Martínez of El Periódico de Catalunya rated the film 2 out of 5 stars, deeming it to "a correct film, but one that we have seen a thousand times. Functional, but aseptic".

Wondering if it had already come the time to praise the much vilified trend of film remakes, Rubén Romero Santos of Cinemanía rated the film 3 1/2 out of 5 stars, assessing that the wedding reception "is basically the same" (as in the French film) but "leaves a better taste in the mouth".

== See also ==
- List of Spanish films of 2020
