= Friends Till Death =

- Theatrical release poster
- Directed by: Javier Veiga
- Screenplay by: Javier Veiga
- Based on: Amigos hasta la muerte by Javier Veiga
- Produced by: Álvaro Pérez Becerra; Mauricio Ochmann
- Starring: Javier Veiga; Marta Hazas; Mauricio Ochmann
- Cinematography: Miguel P. Gilaberte
- Edited by: Jani Madrileño
- Music by: Xoel López; Alfred Tapscott
- Production companies: Medio Limón Producciones; Onírica Producciones; Undodez
- Distributed by: A Contracorriente Films (Spain); Amazon Prime Video (Latin America)
- Release dates: March 11, 2023 (FMCE); September 22, 2023 (Spain)
- Running time: 97 minutes
- Countries: Spain; Mexico
- Language: Spanish

Friends Till Death (Spanish: Amigos hasta la muerte) is a 2023 comedy-drama film written and directed by Javier Veiga in his directorial debut. It stars Veiga, Marta Hazas and Mauricio Ochmann accompanied by Luna Gallego, Nacho Nugo, Óscar Allo, Xosé A. Touriñán, David Amor, Ledicia Sola, Xoel López, Fele Martínez and Mela Casal. It is based on the play of the same name by Javier Veiga.

== Synopsis ==
María, Nacho and Suso are three lifelong friends. Together they have shared many things, perhaps even too many... And suddenly, two of them will have to share the secret that the other is going to die. However, first they have a lot to do: plans, promises, reproaches, laughter, reconciliations, memories, more laughter, some tears... and something pending that perhaps the time has come to uncover...

== Cast ==
Cast credits :

- Mauricio Ochmann as Nacho
  - Nacho Nugo as Nacho university student
- Marta Hazas as María
  - Luna Gallego as Maria university student
- Javier Veiga as Suso
  - Óscar Allo as Suso university student
- Xosé A. Touriñán as José
- David Amor as David
- Ledicia Sola as Ledicia
- Xoel López as Xoel
- Mela Casal as Doctor Escrigas
- Fele Martínez as Paolo
- Patricia Castrillón as Patri

== Production ==
Principal photography began in July 2022 and ended on September 16 of the same year in Ourense, Galicia.

== Release ==
=== Festivals ===
Friends Till Death had its world premiere on March 11, 2023, at the 26th Málaga Film Festival, then was screened on June 9, 2023, at the 20th Alicante International Film Festival and on August 18 of the same year at the 20th Tarazona Comedy Film Festival.

=== Theatrical ===
It was scheduled to be released commercially on September 15, 2023, in Spanish theaters, but it was delayed until September 22, 2023.

=== International ===
It was released on August 15, 2023, on Amazon Prime Video in Latin American territory.

== Reception ==
=== Box-office ===
The film grossed 27,000 euros on its opening day. Throughout its run in theaters, it attracted 10,195 spectators, accumulating 57,099 euros.

=== Accolades ===
Year	Award / Festival	Category	Recipient	Result	Ref.
2023	20th Alicante International Film Festival	Best Director	Javier Veiga	Won	
2023	20th Alicante International Film Festival	Best Actor	Javier Veiga	Won	
2023	Almería International Film Festival	Best First Film	Friends Till Death	Nominated	
2023	Ibiza International Film Festival	Best Film	Friends Till Death	Nominated	
2023	Ibiza International Film Festival	Best Actor	Javier Veiga	Nominated	
2023	Ibiza International Film Festival	Best Actress	Marta Hazas	Nominated	
2023	Ibiza International Film Festival	Best Cinematography	Miguel P. Gilaberte	Nominated	
2024	38th Goya Awards	Best Original Song	"Eco" – Xoel López	Nominated	
