= Bandolera =

Spanish television series

- Genre: Historical drama Adventure; Romance
- Starring: Marta Hazas; Carles Francino; Isak Férriz; Manuel Bandera; Pastora Vega
- Country of origin: Spain
- Original language: Spanish
- No. of seasons: 2
- No. of episodes: 532

Production
- Production company: Diagonal TV

Original release
- Network: Antena 3
- Release: 10 January 2011 – 11 January 2013

Bandolera is a Spanish daily television series starring Marta Hazas. Produced by Diagonal TV, it aired from January 2011 to January 2013 on Antena 3.

== Premise ==
The fiction follows the adventures of Sarah Reeves (Marta Hazas), a student of Hispanic Philology from the University of Oxford who arrives to the Andalusian village of Arazana in 1882, and involves in a love triangle, featuring brigandage, the birth of the Guardia Civil and the rise of anarchist initiatives in the countryside as some of the backdrop elements.

== Cast ==
- Marta Hazas as Sarah Reeves.
- Carles Francino as Miguel Romero.
- Isak Férriz as Roberto.
- Manuel Bandera as Juan Caballero.
- Pastora Vega as Carmen Saura.
- Aníbal Soto as Tomás Pérez.
- Manuel Galiana as Cosme Saura.
- Adrián Salcedo as Juanito.
- Frank Feys as Richard Thomas.
- Pep Munné as Germán Montoro.
- Laura Ramos as Martina Castro.
- Iván Hermés as Álvaro Montoro.
- Lola Marceli as Adela Oria.
- Sara Rivero as Eugenia Montoro.
- Carolina Clemente as Margarita.
- Juan Gea as Carranza.
- Marcial Álvarez as Marcial, "el Galeno".
- Alfonso Begara as "el Chato".
- Gonzalo Cunill as Melgar.
- Tomás del Estal as Morales.
- Eugenio Barona as Capitán Olmedo.

== Production and release ==
Bandolera was produced by Diagonal TV for Antena 3. The first episode of the series premiered in prime time on 10 January 2011 in order to get exposure, and it was subsequently moved to the sobremesa slot for its daily broadcasting. The second season aired from 1 September 2012 to 11 January 2013. The full broadcasting run comprised 532 episodes. The series increased its viewership figures each year of broadcasting. The last episode, filmed in November 2012, aired on 11 January 2013, with a "good" 15.3% audience share.
