= Adrián Lastra =

Spanish film actor

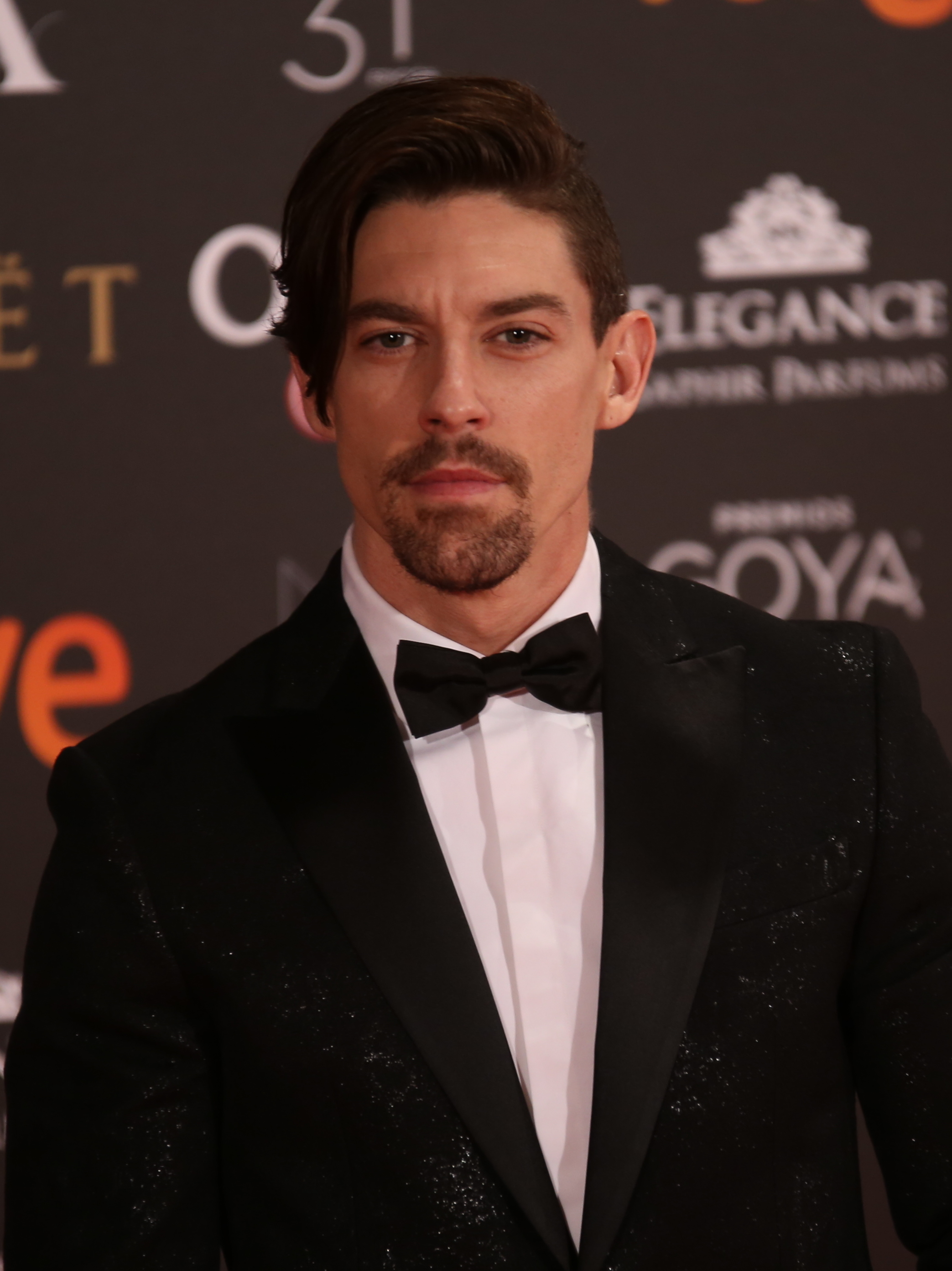
- Lastra at the 31st Goya Awards in 2017
- Born: Luis Adrián Álvaro Lastra; 26 February 1984 (age 41); Madrid, Spain
- Occupations: Actor; dancer; singer
- Years active: 2004–present

Luis Adrián Álvaro Lastra (born 26 February 1984), known professionally as Adrián Lastra, is a Spanish actor, dancer, and singer, known for his performance as Pedro in the TV series Velvet and Velvet Colección.

== Biography ==
Luis Adrián Álvaro Lastra was born on 26 February 1984 in Palomeras Bajas, Puente de Vallecas, Madrid, to a working-class family. Before entering his scenic career, Lastra took vocational training courses in electronics, but according to him, he was a "bad student". Reportedly moved to start a musical career after watching David Bustamante's performances in Operación Triunfo, his education in this area began in 2003, taking classes of vocal technique and musical performance as student of Victoria Manso and Patricia Ferro.

He began a career in musical theatre in 2004. He has since starred in stage plays such as Broadway Millennium, Hoy no me puedo levantar, En tu fiesta me colé, Flashdance, 40, el musical, Billy Elliot, El discurso del rey. His first main role in television was his performance as 'Pipo' in the Corta-T series, aired on Cuatro.

He starred in the film 2011 film Primos (Cousinhood), playing José Miguel, a military veteran of Afghanistan, addicted to pills. This performance earned him a nomination to the Goya Award for Best New Actor in 2012.

He also performed as leading actor in the 2011 comedy Fuga de cerebros 2 (sequel to Fuga de cerebros), playing Alfonso Carbajosa. He also played a teacher in seduction techniques in the 2017 comedy El club de los buenos infieles. Venturing into horror, Lastra starred in as leading actor in Noctem, a 2017 mockumentary film directed by Marcos Cabotá in which Lastra played himself. Lastra also appeared in the 2020 comedy Hasta que la boda nos separe.

Lastra became very popular for his role as the Pedro Infantes in the series Velvet, reprised in the sequel Velvet Colección.

== Filmography ==
=== Film ===
Year	Title	Role	Notes	Ref.
2011	Primos (Cousinhood)	José Miguel		
2011	Fuga de cerebros 2	Alfonso Carbajosa		
2017	Toc Toc	Otto		
2017	El club de los buenos infieles			
2017	Noctem			
2019	Litus	Marcos		
2020	Hasta que la boda nos separe (The Wedding Unplanner)	Ben		
2022	La manzana de oro	Eugenio Alpuente		

=== Television ===
Year	Title	Role	Notes	Ref.
2005	Corta-T	Pipo		
2008	Lalola	Boogie		
2008	Impares	El Ruli		
2009	Bicho malo (nunca muere)	El Ruli		
2011	BuenAgente	Jorge		
2012	Stamos okupa2	Antonio, "Pistolas"		
2014–2016	Velvet	Pedro Infantes		
2017–2019	Velvet Colección	Pedro Infantes		
2021	Jaguar	Sordo		

== Awards and nominations ==
Year	Award	Category	Work	Result	Ref.
2012	Goya Awards	Best New Actor	Primos	Nominated	
2016	Ercilla Awards	Best Stage Actor	El discurso del rey	Won	
