= Velvet Colección =

- Genre: Comedy drama Romance
- Created by: Ramón Campos; Gema R. Neira
- Starring: Marta Hazas; Asier Etxeandia; Adrián Lastra; Diego Martín; Llorenç González; Imanol Arias; Andrea Duro; Mónica Cruz; Marta Torné; Adriana Ozores; Megan Montaner; Fernando Guallar
- Country of origin: Spain
- Original language: Spanish
- No. of seasons: 2 (+1 special episode)
- No. of episodes: 21

Production
- Executive producer: Movistar+
- Running time: 50 minutes (approx.)
- Production company: Bambú Producciones

Original release
- Network: #0
- Release: 21 September 2017

Related
- Velvet

Velvet Colección (Velvet Collection) is a Spanish comedy-drama television series produced by Bambú Producciones for Movistar+. The series is the sequel to Velvet, which was created for Antena 3. The first season contains 10 episodes, and premiered on 21 September 2017 on #0 and Movistar+'s VOD service. The series, set in Barcelona in the 1960s, follows the opening of a new Galerías Velvet fashion store.

On 4 October 2017, the series was renewed for a second season.

The series was initially renewed for a third season in 2018, but on 8 March 2019, it was announced that instead of the third series, there would be a Christmas Special, shown in 2019, closing the series.

== Premise ==
After three years living in New York City with her husband Alberto and their son, Ana Ribera returned to Spain to further expand their project. Alberto and Ana have been managing the company from afar, and have ensured, together with their colleagues and friends, the continuity of setting new trends and innovating. Now the company is opening a new branch at Passeig de Gràcia in Barcelona, and the lead characters will leave Madrid to expand the business.

== Cast ==
=== Main cast ===
- Marta Hazas as Clara Montesinos Martín de Ruiz
- Asier Etxeandia as Raúl de la Riva
- Adrián Lastra as Pedro Infantes
- Diego Martín as Enrique Otegui
- Llorenç Gónzalez as Jonás Infantes
- Imanol Arias as Eduard Godó
- Andrea Duro as Marie Leduc
- Adriana Ozores as Macarena Rey
- Mónica Cruz as Carmela Cortés
- Marta Torné as Paloma
- Megan Montaner as Elena
- Nacho Montes as Manuel "Manolito" Infantes Blázquez
- Paula Usero as Inés
- Fernando Guallar as Sergio Godó Rey
- Raúl Prieto as Rafael Cortés "El aguja"

=== Recurring cast ===
- Aitana Sánchez-Gijón as Blanca Soto Fernández
- Javier Rey as Mateo Ruiz Lagasca
- Miriam Giovanelli as Patricia "Patty" Marquez Campos vda. de Alcocér
- Paula Echevarría as Ana Ribera López de Márquéz
- José Sacristán as Emilio López
- Amaia Salamanca as Bárbara de Senillosa de Otegui
- Lucía Diez as Lourdes "Lourditas" Otegui Senillosa
- Aitor Luna as Humberto Santamaría
- Miguel Ángel Silvestre as Alberto Márquez Navarro

== Episodes ==
=== Season 1 (2017) ===
No.	Title	Directed by
1	"Nuevos horizontes"	Gustavo Ron
2	"Mucho más que un recuerdo"	Gustavo Ron
3	"La emperatriz"	Gustavo Ron
4	"Cambio de rumbo"	Jorge Torregrossa
5	"Una nueva oportunidad"	Jorge Torregrossa
6	"Escándalo"	Gustavo Ron
7	"Ahora o nunca"	Gustavo Ron
8	"Brigitte Bardot"	Álvaro Ron
9	"París, Je t'aime"	Gustavo Ron
10	"El último adiós"	Gustavo Ron

=== Season 2 (2018) ===
No.	Title	Directed by
1	"Un encargo singular"	Gustavo Ron
2	"Una operación de riesgo"	Gustavo Ron
3	"Una visita inesperada"	Gustavo Ron
4	"El pasado siempre vuelve"	Jorge Torregrossa
5	"Cuando menos te lo esperas"	Jorge Torregrossa
6	"Las mil y una noches"	Gustavo Ron
7	"Nuevos amores"	Gustavo Ron
8	"Amistades peligrosas"	Jorge Torregrossa
9	"Una nueva realidad"	Jorge Torregrossa
10	"Felices fiestas"	Gustavo Ron

=== Special (2019) ===
No.	Title	Directed by
1	"Una Navidad para recordar"	Gustavo Ron and Jorge Torregrossa

== Reception ==
=== Awards and nominations ===
Year	Awards	Category	Nominee	Result	Ref
2018	5th Platino Awards	Best Miniseries or TV series	Velvet Colección	Nominated	
2018	5th Platino Awards	Best Actor in a Miniseries or TV series	Asier Etxeandia	Nominated	
2018	5th Platino Awards	Best Actress in a Miniseries or TV series	Marta Hazas	Nominated	
