= Velvet (TV series) =

- Also known as: Galerías Velvet
- Genre: Drama
- Created by: Ramón Campos; Gema R. Neira
- Directed by: Carlos Sedes; David Pinillos
- Starring: Paula Echevarría; Miguel Ángel Silvestre
- Theme music composer: Lucio Godoy
- Opening theme: "Falling in Love" by Alba Llibre
- Country of origin: Spain
- Original language: Spanish
- No. of seasons: 4
- No. of episodes: 54

Production
- Executive producer: Atresmedia
- Running time: 70 minutes (approx.)
- Production company: Bambú Producciones

Original release
- Network: Antena 3
- Release: 17 February 2014 – 21 December 2016

Related
- Velvet Colección; Velvet: El nuevo imperio

Velvet (also known as Galerías Velvet) is a Spanish drama television series created by Ramón Campos and Gema R. María and produced by Bambú Producciones for Antena 3. Its budget is estimated in 500,000 euros per episode. The main storyline of the show is the love story of Alberto Márquez (played by Miguel Ángel Silvestre), heir of Galerías Velvet, one of the most prestigious fashion houses in the Spain of the late 1950s, and Ana Ribera (Paula Echevarría), who lives and works there as a seamstress.

== Cast ==
This is the list of characters of the series.

- Paula Echevarría as Ana Ribera López de Márquez
- Miguel Ángel Silvestre as Alberto Márquez Navarro
- Aitana Sánchez-Gijón as Blanca Soto Fernández
- Manuela Velasco as Cristina Otegui Mendoza
- Javier Rey as Mateo Ruiz Lagasca
- Marta Hazas as Clara Montesinos Martín de Ruiz
- Cecilia Freire as Margarita "Rita" Montesinos Martín de Infantes
- Adrián Lastra as Pedro Infantes
- Miriam Giovanelli as Patricia Márquez Campos vda. de Alcocer
- José Sacristán as Emilio López
- Asier Etxeandía as Raúl de la Riva
- Diego Martín as Enrique Otegui Mendoza
- Amaia Salamanca as Barbara de Senilliosa de Otegui
- Peter Vives as Carlos Álvarez
- Llorenç González as Jonás Infantes
- Pastora Vega as Carmen Alcocer vda. de Alcocer
- Francesco Testi as Marco Cafiero
- Concha Velasco as Petra Alcalde Vargas
- Aitor Luna as Humberto Santamaría
- Tito Valverde as Rafael Márquez Encinas
- Juan Ribó as Francisco
- Pep Munné as Gerardo Otegui
- Cristina de Inza as Aurora "Aurorita" Vargas
- Ángela Molina as Isabel Navarro vda. de Márquez
- Gorka Otxoa as Valentín Alcocer Alcocer

Supporting characters

- Sara Rivero as Carmen Soto
- Cristina Plazas as Pilar Márquez Encinas
- Ana Labordeta as Cayetana
- Manuela Vellés as Luisa Rivas
- Teresa Calo as Nieves
- Paula González as Ana Ribera López (child)
- Georgina Amorós as Ana Ribera López (teenager)
- Santi Díaz as Alberto Navarro Márquez (child)
- Oriol Puig as Alberto Navarro Márquez (teenager)
- Natalia Millán as Gloria Campos
- Eduardo Santos as Jaime
- Maxi Iglesias as Maximiliano "Max" Expósito
- Mauro Rivera as Felipe Murillo
- Marisa Ruiz as Elvira
- Rut Santamaría as Pepita
- Pedro Miguel Martínez as Fernando Valela
- Inma Cuevas as Genoveva
- Guillermo Barrientos as Domínguez
- Eva Ugarte as Rosa María "Rosamari" Blázquez
- Gael Flores as Manuel "Manolito" Infantes Blázquez
- Cristina Llorente as Susú Miravelles
- Alberto Ferreiro as Juan
- Benito Sagredo as Adolfo Valor
- Kimberley Tell as Gracia de Mónaco
- Christophe Miraval as Secretario Real de Mónaco
- Cuca Escribano as Lidia Cano
- Peter Vives as Carlos Álvarez
- Silvia Marsó as Julia Lagasca
- Anna Briansó as Herminia Lagasca
- Marisa Lahoz as Sagrario Lagasca
- Juan Gea as Lorenzo Palacios
- Carolina Bang as Verónica Lago
- Ginés García Millán as Esteban Márquez Encinas
- Juana Acosta as Sara Ortega
- Daniel Guzmán as Lucas Ruiz Lagasca
- Kiti Mánver as Consuelo Martín
- Juli Mira as Fernando Montesinos
- William Miller as Belategui
- Empar Ferrer as Tía de Rita
- Carlos Gorbe as Víctor
- Andrea Masulli as Ramira
- Alfonso Manjavacas as Alfonso
- Víctor Ullate as O'Brien
- Charlotte Vega as Lucía Márquez
- Manu Fullola as Miguel Serrano
- Lolo Martín as José Luis
- Frank Crudele as Enzo Cafiero
- Asier Hernández as Ernesto
- Emilio Linder as Pablo Granados
- Jesús Cabrero as Detective
- Chema Tena as Police
- Cristóbal Araqué as Periodista
- Ramón Rados as Ginecólogo2
- Natalia Barceló as Enfermera
- José Navar as Sr. Barbé
- Paco Lahoz as Félix
- Chema Ruiz as Doctor
- Manuel Millán as Ginecólogo
- Josu Ormaetxe as Doctor2
- José Luis Navarro as Padre Don Amancio
- Paula Prendes as Adele Lavigne
- Naia Guz as Cristina "Cris" Mendoza Otegui
- Isidoro Fernández as Notario
- Álvaro Roig as Dr. Quintanilla
- Chisco Amado as Ricardo Palacios
- Carlos Martínez Merón as Dr. de Patricia
- Iria del Río as Antonia Infantes
- Aitor Calderón as Alberto Márquez Ribera
- Alberto Roldán as Miguel Infantes Montesinos
- Iker Mazón as Jorge Infantes Montesinos
- Toni Agustí as Julián Sarmiento
- Nando González as Doctor Isasa
- Chema León as Juan
- Pep Miràs as Manuel
- Julián Ortega as Photographer
- Xavi Lite as Dr. de Valentín
- Huichi Chiu as Asian woman

== Episodes ==
=== Series overview ===
Series	Episodes	Originally released		Average viewership	Average share
Series	Episodes	First released	Last released	Average viewership	Average share
1	16	17 January 2014	26 May 2014	4 262 000	21.8%
2	13	21 October 2014	23 February 2015	4 101 000	22.2%
3	15	19 October 2015	17 December 2015	3 159 000	18.2%
4	11	5 October 2016	21 December 2016	3 572 000	21.1%

=== Season 1 (2014) ===
No. overall	No. in season	Title	Directed by	Original release date	Spain viewers (millions)
1	1	"Alas de mariposa / Butterfly Wings"	Carlos Sedes	17 January 2014	4.85
2	2	"Y llegó ella / And She Arrived"	David Pinillos & Carlos Sedes	24 February 2014	4.37
3	3	"Nada es tan sencillo / Nothing is so simple"	David Pinillos	3 March 2014	4.42
4	4	"El diseñador / The designer"	Carlos Sedes	10 March 2014	4.11
5	5	"Entre dos mujeres / Between two women"	Carlos Sedes	17 March 2014	4.22
6	6	"París"	David Pinillos	24 March 2014	4.02
7	7	"El día después / The day after"	David Pinillos	31 March 2014	4.18
8	8	"Le decisión de Alberto / Alberto's choice"	Carlos Sedes	7 April 2014	4.05
9	9	"El gran día / The big day"	Carlos Sedes	14 April 2014	3.70
10	10	"Los restos del naufragio / The remains of the shipwreck"	David Pinillos	21 April 2014	4.08
11	11	"La visita / The visitor"	David Pinillos	28 April 2014	4.20
12	12	"Terciopelo azul / Blue Velvet"	Jorge Sánchez-Cabezudo	5 May 2014	4.06
13	13	"Mentiras piadosas / Compassionate Lies"	Jorge Sánchez-Cabezudo	12 May 2014	4.19
14	14	"La noche de la reina / Night of the Queen"	Sílvia Quer	19 May 2014	4.50
15	15	"Cuenta atrás / Countdown"	Sílvia Quer	26 May 2014	4.67

=== Season 2 (2014–15) ===
No. overall	No. in season	Title	Directed by	Original release date	Spain viewers (millions)
16	1	"La noche de los alfileres"	Jorge Sánchez-Cabezudo	21 October 2014	4.08
17	2	"Remontando el vuelo"	David Pinillos & Carlos Sedes	28 October 2014	3.91
18	3	"Días de gloria"	Carlos Sedes	4 November 2014	4.03
19	4	"Coser y cantar"	Carlos Sedes	11 November 2014	4.03
20	5	"¿Quién da más?"	Carlos Sedes	18 November 2014	3.80
21	6	"New York, New York"	David Pinillos	25 November 2014	4.17
22	7	"Por los aires"	David Pinillos	2 December 2014	4.11
23	8	"Navidades blancas"	Carlos Sedes	9 December 2014	4.14
24	9	"Noche de reyes"	David Pinillos	16 December 2014	4.36
25	10	"La otra noche de reyes"	David Pinillos	26 January 2015	3.32
26	11	"La hora de la verdad"	Jorge Sánchez-Cabezudo	2 February 2015	4.01
27	12	"Hoy es el día de los enamoradoss"	Jorge Sánchez-Cabezudo	9 February 2015	3.95
28	13	"Despedidas"	Jorge Sánchez-Cabezudo	16 February 2015	4.06
29	14	"Una boda y un funeral"	Carlos Sedes	23 February 2015	4.60

== International broadcast ==
In the 2014 edition of MIPTV Media Market, the rights for Velvet were acquired by Italy's RAI and France's M6. RAI also got the rights for a remake. In Lithuania, it started airing on LNK on 1 June 2014. In Greece and Cyprus, it is airing on Nova Life and from 20 June is airing also from ANT1 and ANT1 Cyprus. In Finland, the series started airing in December 2015 on YLE Teema. In Slovenia the premiere was on RTVSLO on 15 May 2016, and in Slovakia it was on TV Doma on 4 July 2016. Czech republic Prima LOVETV on 13 October 2018.

This series was also available On Unimás in 2016 til 2018 and on the Netflix streaming service but was removed globally in 2024. Some US PBS stations, such as WLIW New York and NJ PBS, have begun broadcasting the series with English subtitles in 2025.

== Reception ==
=== Ratings ===
Viewership and ratings per season of Velvet
Season	Episodes	First aired		Last aired		Avg. viewers (millions)
Season	Episodes	Date	Viewers (millions)	Date	Viewers (millions)	Avg. viewers (millions)
1	15	17 January 2014	4.85	26 May 2014	4.67	4.25
2	14	21 October 2014	4.08	23 February 2015	4.60	4.05

=== Awards and nominations ===
Year	Award	Category	Nominee(s)	Result	Ref.
2014	2nd MiM Series Awards	Best Drama Series		Nominated	
2014	2nd MiM Series Awards	Best Creation		Won	
2014	2nd MiM Series Awards	Best Direction		Nominated	
2014	2nd MiM Series Awards	Best Actress	Paula Echevarría	Nominated	
2014	2nd MiM Series Awards	Best Actor	Miguel Ángel Silvestre	Nominated	
2015	65th Fotogramas de Plata	Best TV Actress	Cecilia Freire	Nominated	
2015	65th Fotogramas de Plata	Best TV Actor	Asier Etxeandia	Nominated	
2015	3rd MiM Series Awards	Best Drama Actress	Paula Echevarría	Nominated	
2016	25th Actors and Actresses Union Awards	Best Television Actress in a Secondary Role	Cecilia Freire	Nominated	
2016	25th Actors and Actresses Union Awards	Best Television Actor in a Secondary Role	Asier Etxeandia	Won	
2016	25th Actors and Actresses Union Awards	Best Television Actor in a Minor Role	Diego Martín	Nominated	
2016	4th MiM Series Awards	Best Drama Actress	Paula Echevarría	Nominated	
2017	4th Feroz Awards	Best Supporting Actor in a TV Series	José Sacristán	Won	
2017	4th Feroz Awards	Best Supporting Actress in a TV Series	Cecilia Freire	Nominated	
2017	67th Fotogramas de Plata	Best Spanish TV Series		Nominated	
2017	67th Fotogramas de Plata	Best TV Actress	Paula Echevarría	Won	
2017	67th Fotogramas de Plata	Best TV Actress	Cecilia Freire	Nominated	
2017	67th Fotogramas de Plata	Best TV Actor	Asier Etxeandia	Nominated	
2017	26th Actors and Actresses Union Awards	Best Television Actor in a Leading Role	José Sacristán	Nominated	
2017	26th Actors and Actresses Union Awards	Best Television Actor in a Secondary Role	Asier Etxeandia	Nominated	
2017	26th Actors and Actresses Union Awards	Best Television Actor in a Minor Role	Adrián Lastra	Won	

== Spin-off ==
On 9 February 2017, subscription platform Movistar+ announced they had acquired the rights to produce a spin-off series of Velvet, titled Velvet Colección, which will be centered on the opening of a second Galerías Velvet store in Barcelona in 1967. Adrián Lastra as Pedro Infantes, Asier Etxeandia as Raúl de la Riva, Llorenç González as Jonás Infantes, Javier Rey as Mateo Ruiz Lagasca, Marta Hazas as Clara Montesinos, Diego Martín as Enrique Otegui, and Aitana Sánchez-Gijón as Blanca Soto reprise their roles; Paula Echevarría and José Sacristán also appear as Ana Ribera and Emilio López respectively in the first episode. New actors include Imanol Arias, Adriana Ozores, Mónica Cruz, Andrea Duro and Marta Torné. The series premiered on 21 September 2017.

== Adaptation ==
In November 2024, American Spanish-language network Telemundo announced it had acquired the remake rights to Velvet was developing a modern-day adaptation set in New York City. In January 2025, Samantha Siqueiros and Yon González were announced in the lead roles. Velvet: El nuevo imperio is set to premiere on 19 May 2025.
