= Paula Echevarría =

Spanish model and actress

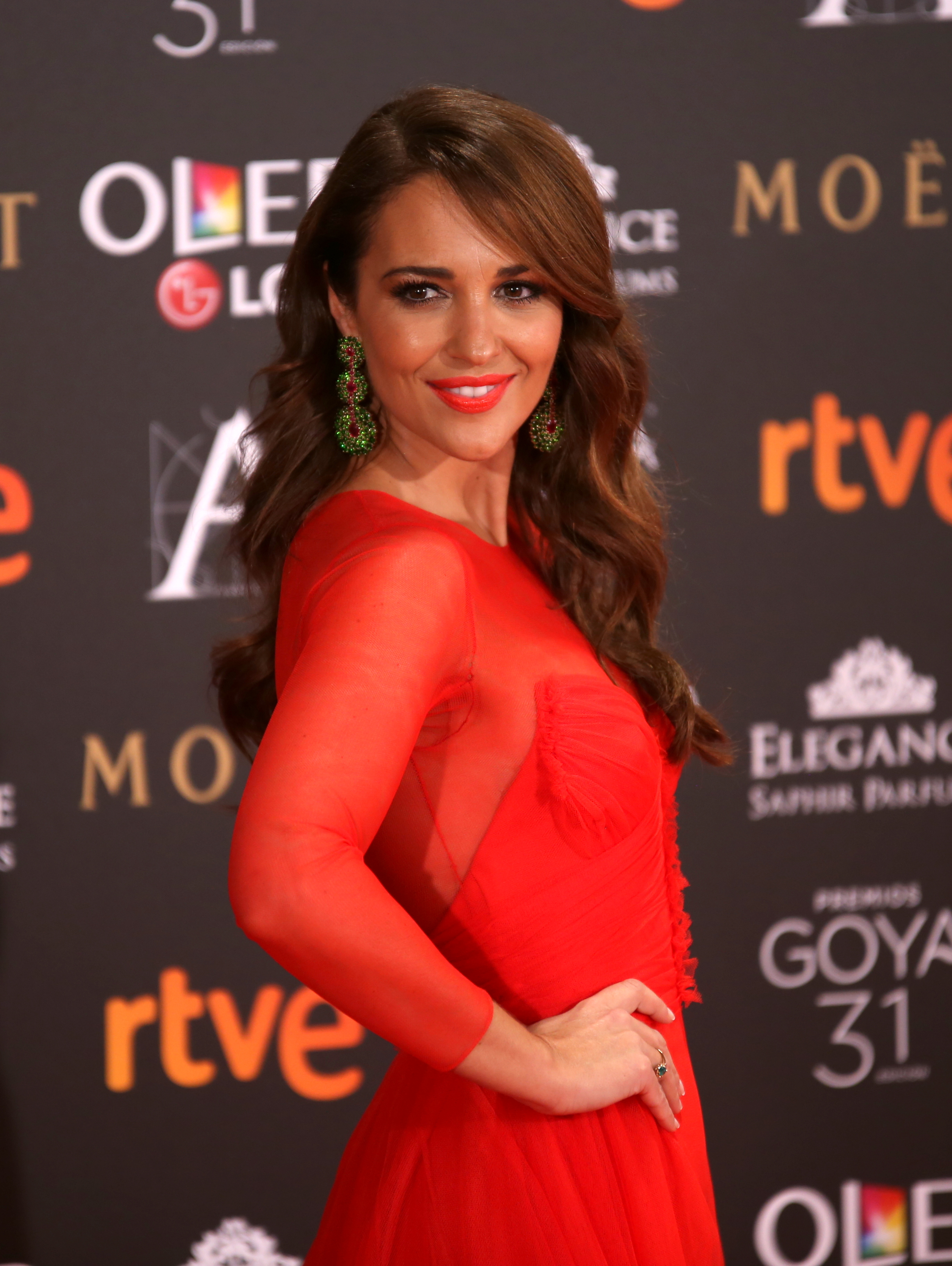
- Echevarría at the Goya Awards in 2017
- Born: Paula Echevarría Colodrón; 7 August 1977 (age 48); Candás, Carreño, Asturias, Spain
- Occupations: Actress, model
- Years active: 2000–present
- Height: 1.68 m (5 ft 6 in)
- Spouse: David Bustamante (m. 2006; div. 2018)
- Partner: Miguel Torres (2018–present)
- Children: 2
- Website: paula-echevarria.blogs.elle.es

Paula Echevarría Colodrón (born 7 August 1977) is a Spanish actress and model.

== Career ==
In 2000, she made her television debut on series such as Al salir de clase, Policías, and Compañeros. During that year, she also worked as a reporter of the summer Telecinco news show Emisión Imposible.

In 2002, she participated as an actress on the Spanish version of Agatha Christie's mystery novel And Then There Were None.

In 2003, she was part of the cast of the television series London Street by Antena 3, and made an appearance in the movie Carmen by Vicente Aranda.

In 2004, she was part of the cast of the movie El chocolate del loro of Ernesto Martín and became part of the regular cast of the Telecinco's series El comisario. until the end of 2007.

In 2005, she made an appearance in the documentary Las locuras de Don Quijote.

In 2006, she was part of the main cast of the thriller Rojo intenso of Javier Elorrieta.

In 2007, she starred along with Álex González in the drama Luz de domingo of José Luis Garci. The film received 5 Premios Goya nominations from the Spanish film academy and was one of the three Spanish candidates for an Academy Award nomination. In 2008, she worked again for Garci in Sangre de mayo. This film celebrated the bicentenary of the Dos de Mayo Uprising. It received seven Premios Goya nominations and was also one of the three Spanish candidates for an Academy Award nomination.

From 2010 to 2013, she was one of the main characters on the TVE-1 series Gran Reserva, filmed in the Spanish region of Rioja about wine business and family feuds. Other actors included Ángela Molina and Emilio Gutiérrez Caba.

From 2010 to 2020, she had a diary blog on Elle's website, called Tras la pista de Paula. She is the Spanish person with the highest number of followers on Instagram. In 2012, she was the person with the highest growth in Google searches in Spain. In 2015, Echevarria was the most searched person on Bing in Spain for two consecutive years.

In 2012, she starred in Vulnerables by Miguel Cruz.

From 2014 to 2016, Echevarría was one of the main characters on Velvet, the prime-time series on Antena 3, together with Miguel Ángel Silvestre, Aitana Sánchez Gijón, Marta Hazas, José Sacristán, Amaia Salamanca, Manuela Velasco and Cecilia Freire. The series takes place at the end of the 1950s and is centered around the love between a seamstress and the wealthy heir of a department store.

In 2017, she filmed Ola de crímenes together with Juana Acosta and Maribel Verdú. The movie premiered on 5 October 2018.

== Personal life ==
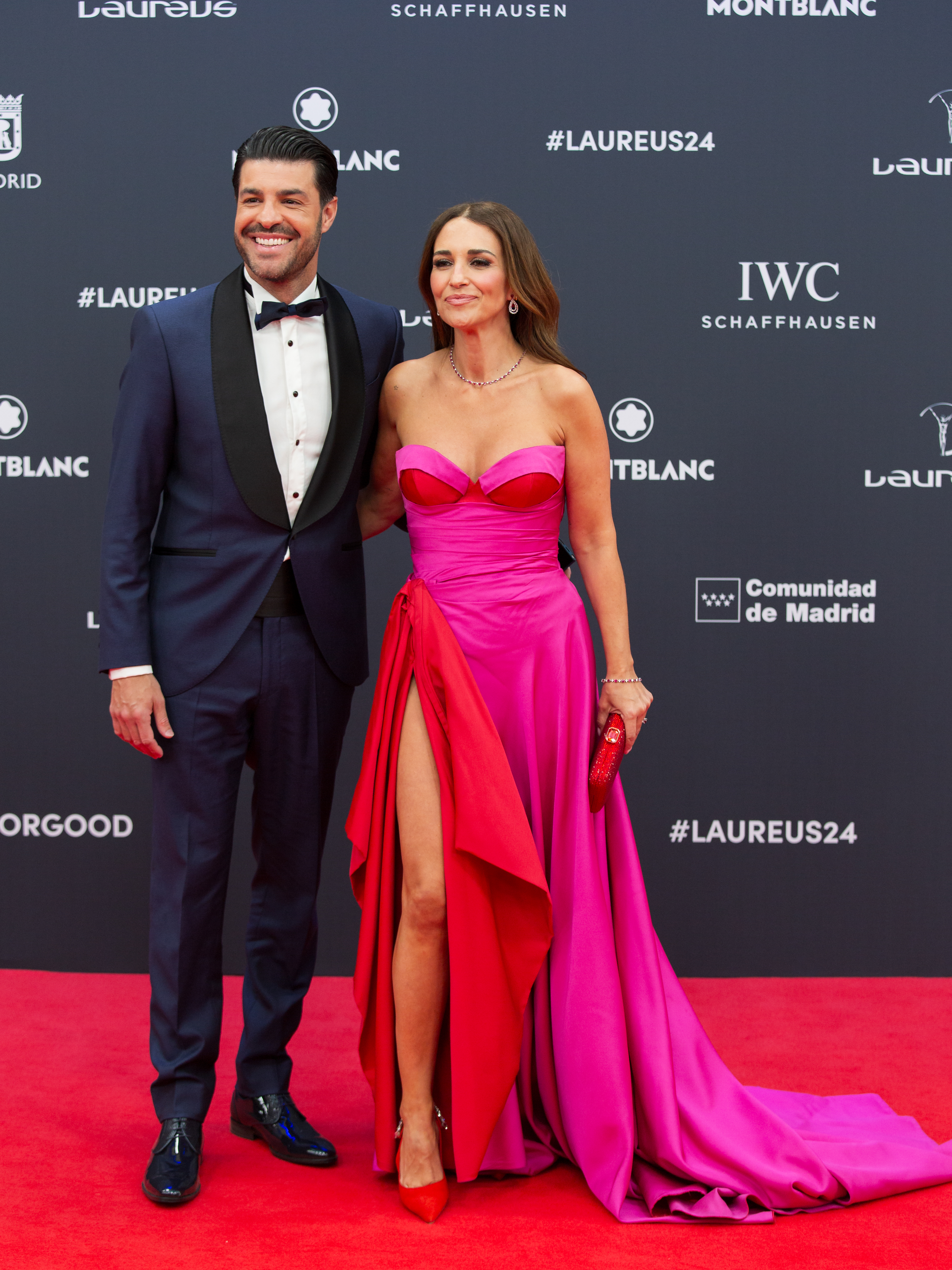
Echevarría and Torres in 2024

On 22 July 2006, she married the Cantabrian singer David Bustamante in the Basílica de Santa María la Real de Covadonga in Asturias. On 17 August 2008, she gave birth to the couple's first child, a daughter named Daniella Bustamante Echevarría. The couple divorced in March 2018.

Since March 2018, Echevarría has been in a relationship with the Spanish former football player Miguel Torres. In September 2020, she announced that she was pregnant with her second child. On 11 April 2021, she gave birth to her second child and first child with her partner, a son named Miguel Torres Echevarría.

== Filmography ==
=== Television ===
| Year | Title | Character | Channel | Notes |
|---|---|---|---|---|
| 2000 | 7 vidas | Rocío | Telecinco | 1 episode |
| 2000 | Compañeros | Paula | Antena 3 | 1 episode |
| 2001 | Mi teniente | Paula | TVE | 1 episode |
| 2001 | Policías, en el corazón de la calle | Eva | Antena 3 | 1 episode |
| 2001 | Al salir de clase | Berta | Telecinco | 4 episodes |
| 2003 | London Street | Nuria | Antena 3 | 13 episodes |
| 2003 | Código fuego | Nuria | Antena 3 | 1 episode |
| 2004–2007 | El comisario | Deputy Inspector Clara Osma | Telecinco | 48 episodes |
| 2010–2013 | Gran Reserva | Lucía Reverte Ruiz | TVE | 42 episodes |
| 2014–2016 | Velvet | Ana Ribera López de Márquez | Antena 3 | 55 episodes |
| 2017, 2019 | Velvet Colección | Ana Ribera López de Márquez | Movistar+ | 8 episodes |
| 2019 | Los nuestros | Sergeant Martina Ibáñez Hacha | Telecinco | 3 episodes |
| 2025 | Camino a Arcadia | Irene | Vix | 6 episodes |

=== Television programs ===
| Year | Program | Channel | Notes |
|---|---|---|---|
| 2000 | Emisión imposible | | Host |
| 2008 | TP de Oro | TVE | Presenter of award for best advertisement |
| 2009 | Gala X Edición de Pelo Pantene | | Judge |
| 2009 | Saturday Night Live | Cuatro | Guest |
| 2011 | Festival Internacional de Cine de San Sebastián | | Award Recipient |
| 2013 | 27th Goya Awards | TVE | Award Recipient |
| 2015 | Gala 25 años de Antena 3 | Antena 3 | Host |
| 2017 | Premios Feroz | | Co-host |
| 2017 | 2017 | TVE | Award Recipient |
| 2018 | Volverte a ver | Telecinco | Guest |
| 2018 | Mi casa es la tuya | Telecinco | Guest |
| 2021 | Planeta Calleja | Cuatro | Guest |
| 2023 | Mask Singer: Adivina quién canta | Antena 3 | Contestant with Miguel Torres |

=== Film ===
| Year | Movie | Character | Director |
|---|---|---|---|
| 2002 | Peor imposible, ¿qué puede fallar? | Girl #2 | José Semprún |
| 2002 | Machín, toda una vida | | Nuria Villazán |
| 2003 | Carmen | Marisol | Vicente Aranda |
| 2004 | El chocolate del loro | Patricia | Ernesto Martín |
| 2005 | Las locuras de Don Quijote | Altisidora | Rafael Alcázar |
| 2005 | La dama blanca | | Nacho Carballo |
| 2006 | Rojo intenso | Ana | Javier Elorrieta |
| 2007 | Sunday Light | Estrella | José Luis Garci |
| 2008 | Sangre de Mayo | Inés | José Luis Garci |
| 2011 | El bizcocho | Neighbor | Lola Guerrero |
| 2012 | Vulnerables | Carla | Miguel Cruz |
| 2018 | Ola de crímenes | Vanesa | Gracia Querejeta |
| 2019 | Si yo fuera rico | Lorena | Álvaro Fernández Armero |

=== Theater ===
| Year | Title | Character | Director | Theater |
|---|---|---|---|---|
| 2002 | Diez negritos | Vera Claythorne | Ricard Reguant | |
| 2003 | José | Musa | Nacho Carballo | |

=== Music videos ===
| Year | Song | Artist |
|---|---|---|
| 2010 | "A contracorriente" | David Bustamante |
| 2019 | "Sería más fácil" | Carlos Rivera |

== Awards and nominations ==
| Year | Award | Category | Work | Result |
|---|---|---|---|---|
| 2010 | Iris Awards | Best Actress | Gran Reserva | Nominated |
| 2010 | Zapping Awards | Best Actress | Gran Reserva | Nominated |
| 2012 | Neox Fan Awards | Best Body | Herself | Nominated |
| 2013 | Neox Fan Awards | Best Film Actress | Vulnerables | Nominated |
| 2013 | Neox Fan Awards | Best Body | Herself | Nominated |
| 2013 | Neox Fan Awards | Best Couple (with David Bustamante) | Herself | Nominated |
| 2014 | Neox Fan Awards | Best Television Actress | Velvet | Nominated |
| 2014 | Neox Fan Awards | Best Selfie (with David Bustamante) | Herself | Nominated |
| 2014 | Neox Fan Awards | Best Kiss (with Miguel Ángel Silvestre) | Velvet | Nominated |
| 2014 | MIM Series Awards | Best Leading Actress in Drama | Velvet | Nominated |
| 2015 | Neox Fan Awards | Best Television Actress | Velvet | Winner |
| 2015 | Neox Fan Awards | Moment OMG (with Miguel Ángel Silvestre) | Velvet | Nominated |
| 2015 | Neox Fan Awards | El que parte Internet (with David Bustamante) | Herself | Nominated |
| 2015 | MIM Series Awards | Best Leading Actress in Drama | Velvet | Nominated |
| 2016 | MIM Series Awards | Best Leading Actress in Drama | Velvet | Nominated |
| 2016 | Fotogramas de Plata Awards | Best Television Actress | Velvet | Winner |
