= 78th CEC Awards =

Spanish film awards

- Date: 6 February 2023
- Site: Palacio de la Prensa, Madrid, Spain
- Hosted by: Sandra Cervera; Jelen García
- Organized by: Círculo de Escritores Cinematográficos

Highlights
- Most awards: The Beasts (9)
- Most nominations: The Beasts (12)

The 78th CEC Medals ceremony, presented by the Círculo de Escritores Cinematográficos, took place on 6 February 2023 at the Palacio de la Prensa in Madrid. The gala was hosted by Sandra Cervera and Jelen García.

== Winners and nominees ==
The winners and nominees are listed as follows:

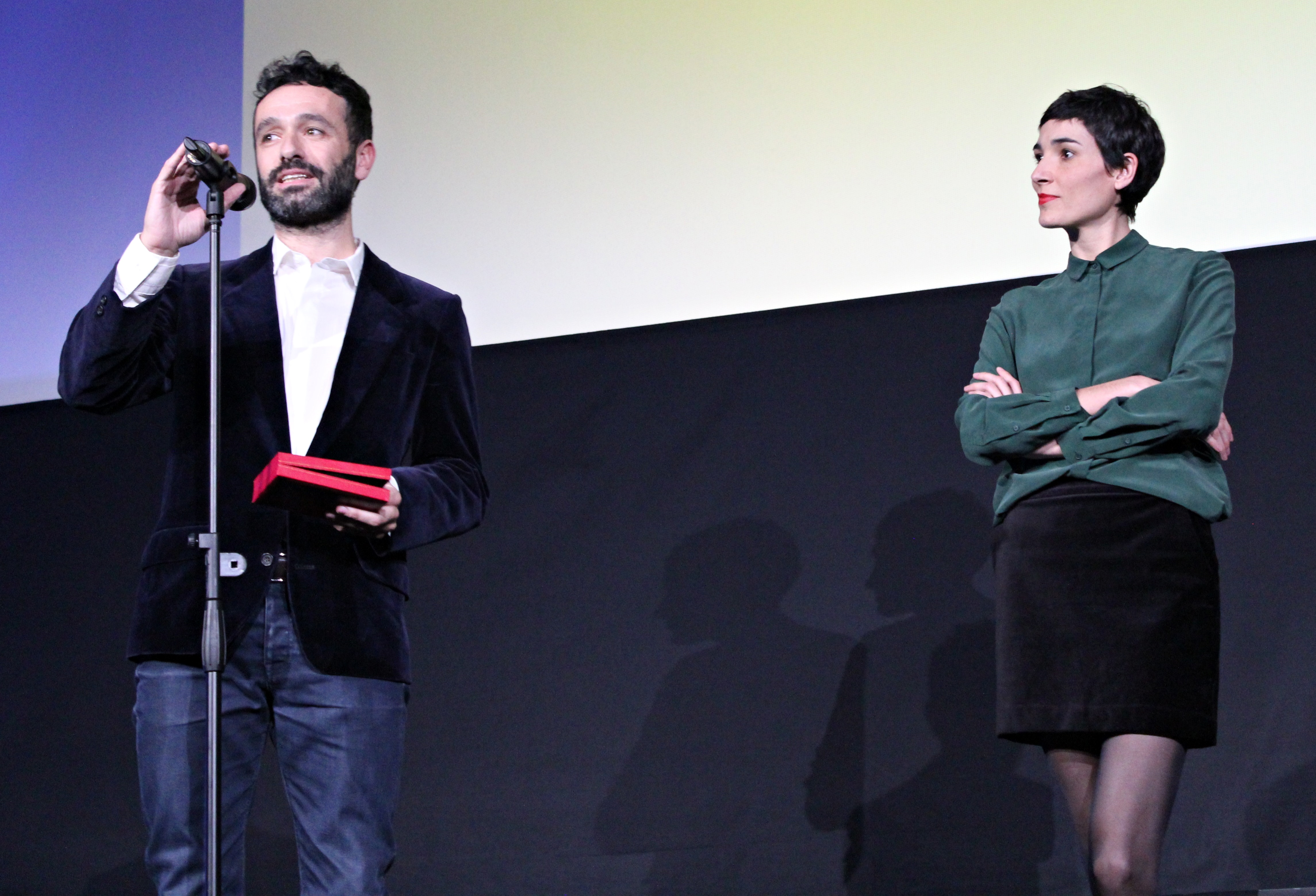
Sorogoyen and Peña thanking the award for Best Original Screenplay

Best Film: The Beasts; Alcarràs; Lullaby; Prison 77	Best Animation Film: Tad, the Lost Explorer and the Emerald Tablet; Unicorn Wars; Inspector Sun and the Curse of the Black Widow; Black Is Beltza II: Ainhoa
Best Director: Rodrigo Sorogoyen – The Beasts; Carla Simón – Alcarràs; Pilar Palomero – Motherhood; Carlos Vermut – Manticore	Best New Director: Alauda Ruiz de Azúa – Lullaby; Juan Diego Botto – On the Fringe; Elena López Riera – The Water; Carlota Pereda – Piggy
Best Original Screenplay: Isabel Peña, Rodrigo Sorogoyen – The Beasts; Alauda Ruiz de Azúa – Lullaby; Arnau Vilaró, Carla Simón – Alcarràs; Alberto Rodríguez, Rafael Cobos – Prison 77	Best Adapted Screenplay: Oriol Paulo, Guillem Clua, Lara Sendim – God's Crooked Lines; Carlota Pereda – Piggy; Isa Campo, Isaki Lacuesta, Fran Araújo – One Year, One Night; David Muñoz, Félix Viscarret – Staring at Strangers
Best Actor: Denis Ménochet – The Beasts; Javier Gutiérrez – Prison 77; Miguel Herrán – Prison 77; Nacho Sánchez – Manticore	Best Actress: Marina Foïs – The Beasts; Laia Costa – Lullaby; Anna Castillo – Wild Flowers; Bárbara Lennie – God's Crooked Lines
Best Supporting Actor: Luis Zahera – The Beasts; Ramón Barea – Lullaby; Diego Anido – The Beasts; Manolo Solo – Wild Flowers	Best Supporting Actress: Susi Sánchez – Lullaby; Marie Colomb – The Beasts; Carmen Machi – Piggy; Berta Pipó – Alcarràs; Luisa Merelas – The Beasts; Bárbara Lennie – The Water
Best New Actor: Albert Bosch – Alcarràs; Mikel Bustamante – Lullaby; Lluís Marqués – Wild Flowers; Christian Checa – On the Fringe; David Lorente – Voy a pasármelo bien	Best New Actress: Laura Galán – Piggy; Carla Quílez – Motherhood; Zoe Stein – Manticore; Anna Otín – Alcarràs
Best Cinematography: Alex de Pablo – The Beasts; Daniela Cajías – Alcarràs; Álex Catalán – Prison 77; Jon D. Domínguez – Lullaby	Best Editing: Alberto del Campo – The Beasts; Ana Pfaff – Alcarràs; Andrés Gil – Lullaby; José M. G. Moyano – Prison 77
Best Music: Oliver Arson – The Beasts; Fernando Velázquez – God's Crooked Lines; Julio de la Rosa – Prison 77; Roque Baños – Four's a Crowd	Best Documentary Film: El crítico; Labordeta, un hombre sin más; Goya, el ojo que escucha; La vida de Brianeitor; Sintiéndolo mucho
Best Foreign Film: Argentina, 1985; Belfast; The Worst Person in the World; Top Gun: Maverick

== Special awards ==
- Honorary Medal: Antonio Banderas
- Medal for the Promotion of Cinema: María José Pérez & Alberto Sestayo (Entertainment One)
- Medal for the Journalistic Merit: Carlos del Amor
- Medal for the Literary Merit: Cruz Delgado Sánchez
- 'Platino Educa de la Solidaridad' Medal (Fiction): Vasil
- 'Platino Educa de la Solidaridad' Medal (non-Fiction): Aquí y ahora
