= Feroz Award for Best Drama Film =

Annual Spanish film award

- Awarded for: Best Spanish Drama Film
- Country: Spain
- Presented by: Asociación de Informadores Cinematográficos de España
- Currently held by: Salve Maria (2025)

The Feroz Award for Best Drama Film (Spanish: Premio Feroz a la mejor película dramática) is one of the annual awards given at the Feroz Awards, presented by the Asociación de Informadores Cinematográficos de España.

It was first presented in 2014, with Rodrigo Sorogoyen's film Stockholm being the first recipient of the award.

== Winners and nominees ==
‡ - Goya Award for Best Film winner
† - Goya Award for Best Film nominee

=== 2010s ===
Year	English title	Original title	Director(s)
2014	Stockholm		Rodrigo Sorogoyen
2014	Cannibal †	Caníbal	Manuel Martín Cuenca
2014	Grand Piano		Eugenio Mira
2014	Wounded †	La herida	Fernando Franco
2014	We All Want What's Best for Her	Tots volem el millor per a ella	Mar Coll
2015	Marshland ‡	La isla mínima	Alberto Rodríguez Librero
2015	10,000 km	10.000 km	Carlos Marqués-Marcet
2015	Beautiful Youth	Hermosa juventud	Jaime Rosales
2015	Loreak †		Jon Garaño and Jose Mari Goenaga
2015	Magical Girl †		Carlos Vermut
2016	The Bride †	La novia	Paula Ortiz
2016	Nothing in Return †	A cambio de nada	Daniel Guzmán
2016	Retribution	El desconocido	Dani de la Torre
2016	Food and Shelter	Techo y comida	Juan Miguel del Castillo
2016	Truman ‡		Cesc Gay
2017	The Fury of a Patient Man ‡	Tarde para la ira	Raúl Arévalo
2017	Smoke & Mirrors †	El hombre de mil caras	Alberto Rodríguez Librero
2017	Julieta †		Pedro Almodóvar
2017	A Monster Calls †		J. A. Bayona
2017	May God Save Us †	Que Dios nos perdone	Rodrigo Sorogoyen
2018	Summer 1993 †	Estiu 1993	Carla Simón
2018	The Motive †	El autor	Manuel Martín Cuenca
2018	Giant †	Handia	Aitor Arregi and Jon Garaño
2018	Can't Say Goodbye	No sé decir adiós	Lino Escalera
2018	Veronica †		Paco Plaza
2019	The Realm †	El reino	Rodrigo Sorogoyen
2019	Carmen & Lola †	Carmen y Lola	Arantxa Echevarría
2019	Petra		Jaime Rosales
2019	Quién te cantará		Carlos Vermut
2019	Everybody Knows †	Todos lo saben	Asghar Farhadi
2019	Journey to a Mother's Room	Viaje al cuarto de una madre	Celia Rico Clavellino

=== 2020s ===
Year	English title	Original title	Director(s)
2020	Pain and Glory ‡	Dolor y gloria	Pedro Almodóvar
2020	The Platform	El hoyo	Galder Gaztelu-Urrutia
2020	The Endless Trench †	La trinchera infinita	Jon Garaño, Aitor Arregi and Jose Mari Goenaga
2020	Fire Will Come †	O que arde	Oliver Laxe
2020	The Days to Come	Els dies que vindran	Carlos Marqués-Marcet
2020	Eye for an Eye	Quién a hierro mata	Paco Plaza
2021	Schoolgirls ‡	Las niñas	Pilar Palomero
2021	Coven	Akelarre	Pablo Agüero
2021	Ane Is Missing †	Ane	David Pérez Sañudo
2021	The Year of the Discovery	El año del descubrimiento	Luis López Carrasco
2021	Cross the Line	No matarás	David Victori
2022	Maixabel †		Icíar Bollaín
2022	The Sacred Spirit	Espíritu sagrado	Chema García Ibarra
2022	Libertad †		Clara Roquet
2022	Parallel Mothers †	Madres paralelas	Pedro Almodóvar
2022	Out of Sync	Tres	Juanjo Giménez
2023	The Beasts ‡	As bestas	Rodrigo Sorogoyen
2023	Alcarràs †		Carla Simón
2023	Lullaby †	Cinco lobitos	Alauda Ruiz de Azúa
2023	Prison 77 †	Modelo 77	Alberto Rodríguez
2023	One Year, One Night	Un año, una noche	Isaki Lacuesta
2024	20,000 Species of Bees †	20.000 especies de abejas	Estibaliz Urresola Solaguren
2024	Un amor †		Isabel Coixet
2024	Close Your Eyes †	Cerrar los ojos	Víctor Erice
2024	Society of the Snow ‡	La sociedad de la nieve	J. A. Bayona
2024	Upon Entry		Alejandro Rojas, Juan Sebastián Vásquez
2025	Salve Maria	Salve María	Mar Coll
2025	The Blue Star †	La estrella azul	Javier Macipe
2025	The Room Next Door		Pedro Almodóvar
2025	The Red Virgin	La virgen roja	Paula Ortiz
2025	Glimmers	Los destellos	Pilar Palomero
2026	Sundays	Los domingos	Alauda Ruiz de Azúa
2026	Maspalomas		Jose Mari Goenaga, Aitor Arregi
2026	Romería		Carla Simón
2026	Sirāt		Oliver Laxe
2026	Deaf	Sorda	Eva Libertad

== See also ==
- Goya Award for Best Film
