= BTeam Pictures =

Spanish film distribution company

- Formerly: Betta Pictures (2013–2017)
- Industry: Entertainment
- Founded: 2013; 13 years ago
- Headquarters: Madrid, Spain
- Products: Motion pictures
- Services: Film distribution/production
- Divisions: BTeam Prods

BTeam Pictures is a Spanish film distribution company. The company is based in Madrid. It is headed by Alex Lafuente, Ania Jones and Lara Pérez Camiña. It also has a film production division.

== History ==
The company was founded in Barcelona in 2013 under the name of Betta Pictures, one among the several indie distributors launched in Spain upon the demise of Alta Films. Betta picked up Me and You for their debut film as distributors.

In 2017, the company renamed to BTeam Pictures and launched the production arm BTeam Prods, that debuted with the co-production of Isaki Lacuesta's Between Two Waters (2018), which won the Golden Seashell. Alex Lafuente had previously involved in production with Paula Ortiz's The Bride. BTeam later co-produced A Thief's Daughter (directed by Belén Funes), Schoolgirls (directed by Pilar Palomero), The Volunteer (directed by Nely Reguera), and Manticore (directed by Carlos Vermut).

== Releases ==
Filmax films released in the 2020s
Release date (Note: The listed date refers to the film's theatrical release in Spain by BTeam Pictures, not necessarily its first screening or when it premiered.)	Title	Director(s)	Ref.
11 October 2017	A Fantastic Woman	Sebastián Lelio	
19 January 2018	Zama	Lucrecia Martel	
29 June 2018	On Chesil Beach	Dominic Cooke	
31 October 2018	El Angel	Luis Ortega	
15 August 2019	The August Virgin	Jonás Trueba	
29 November 2019	A Thief's Daughter	Belén Funes	
4 September 2020	Schoolgirls	Pilar Palomero	
11 December 2020	It Snows in Benidorm	Isabel Coixet	
9 April 2021	Another Round	Thomas Vinterberg	
9 July 2021	Miss Marx	Susanna Nicchiarelli	
20 May 2022	Lullaby	Alauda Ruiz de Azúa	
21 October 2022	One Year, One Night	Isaki Lacuesta	
18 November 2022	Motherhood	Pilar Palomero	
9 December 2022	Manticore	Carlos Vermut	
17 March 2023	The Kings of the World	Laura Mora Ortega	
5 April 2023	The Innocent	Louis Garrel	
21 April 2023	20,000 Species of Bees	Estibaliz Urresola Solaguren	
26 May 2023	Strange Way of Life	Pedro Almodóvar	
10 November 2023	Un amor	Isabel Coixet	
24 November 2023	Teresa	Paula Ortiz	
6 December 2023	Robot Dreams	Pablo Berger	
22 December 2024	The Book of Solutions	Michel Gondry	
12 January 2024	The Eternal Memory	Maite Alberdi	
14 February 2024	Priscilla	Sofia Coppola	
8 March 2024	Little Loves	Celia Rico	
22 March 2024	The Successor	Xavier Legrand	
26 April 2024	There's Still Tomorrow	Paola Cortellesi	
10 May 2024	Nina	Andrea Jaurrieta	
24 May 2024	Saturn Return	Isaki Lacuesta, Pol Rodríguez	
3 July 2024	Out of Season	Stéphane Brizé	
23 August 2024	Haunted Heart	Fernando Trueba	
8 November 2024	Marco, the Invented Truth	Aitor Arregi, Jon Garaño	
25 December 2024	Parthenope	Paolo Sorrentino	
17 January 2025	The Seed of the Sacred Fig	Mohammad Rasoulof	
28 February 2025	Hard Truths	Mike Leigh	
21 March 2025	Breaking Walls	Borja Cobeaga	
11 April 2025	Away	Gerard Oms	
25 April 2025	Pheasant Island	Asier Urbieta	
6 June 2025	Sirāt	Oliver Laxe	
23 June 2025	Ramón and Ramón	Salvador del Solar	
1 August 2025	Paternal Leave	Alissa Jung	
26 September 2025	Maspalomas	Jose Mari Goenaga, Aitor Arregi	
17 October 2025	Sundays	Alauda Ruiz de Azúa	
7 November 2025	Always Winter	David Trueba	
21 November 2025	Sleepless City	Guillermo Galoe	
19 December 2025	The Stranger	François Ozon	
13 March 2026	Eagles of the Republic	Tarik Saleh	
27 March 2026	Better Class	Víctor García León	
24 July 2026	The Message	Iván Fund	
