= Offworld (TV series) =

Spanish television series

- Spanish: Apagón
- Based on: El gran apagón by José A. Pérez de Ledo
- Directed by: Rodrigo Sorogoyen; Raúl Arévalo; Isa Campo; Alberto Rodríguez; Isaki Lacuesta
- Starring: Luis Callejo; María Vázquez; Patricia López Arnaiz; Ainhoa Santamaría; Jesús Carroza; Melina Matthews; Tomás del Estal; Javier Tena; Zoé Arnao; Miquel Fernández; Naira Lleó; Mourad Ouani; Sofía El Bouanani
- Country of origin: Spain
- Original language: Spanish
- No. of episodes: 5

Production
- Production company: Buendía Estudios

Original release
- Network: Movistar Plus+
- Release: 29 September 2022

Offworld (Spanish: Apagón) is a Spanish television series based on the apocalyptic podcast El gran apagón. The 5-part series tracks 5 independent stories of people dealing with an apocalyptic situation in the wake of a solar storm. A Movistar Plus+ original, it is directed by Rodrigo Sorogoyen, Raúl Arévalo, Isa Campo, Alberto Rodríguez and Isaki Lacuesta.

== Plot ==
Focused on Spain, the plot the mishaps of different characters in the wake of a solar storm, adapting to a planet lacking much of the technology that was previously available.

== Cast ==
- Luis Callejo as Ernesto (Ep. 1)
- Melina Matthews (Ep. 2)
- Ainhoa Santamaría (Ep. 2)
- Tomás del Estal (Ep. 2)
- Javier Tena (Ep. 2)
- Patricia López Arnaiz (Ep. 3)
- Zoé Arnao (Ep. 3)
- Miquel Fernández (Ep. 3)
- Jesús Carroza as Cortelazor (Ep. 4)
- Naira Lleó (Ep. 4)
- María Vázquez as Alicia (Ep. 5)
- Mourad Ouani (Ep. 5)
- Sofía El Bouanani (Ep. 5)

== Production ==
The series is based on the podcast El gran apagón, and it is a Buendía Estudios production. The 5 episodes were directed by Rodrigo Sorogoyen, Raúl Arévalo, Isa Campo, Alberto Rodríguez and Isaki Lacuesta. Shooting locations included Madrid, and the provinces of Toledo, Segovia, Guadalajara, and Ciudad Real.

== Release ==
The series premiered in September 2022 at the 70th San Sebastián International Film Festival as part of the festival's official selection (screened out of competition). Movistar Plus+ released the series on 29 September 2022.

== Episodes ==
No. in season	Title	Directed by	Written by	Original release date
1	"Negación"	Rodrigo Sorogoyen	Isabel Peña	29 September 2022
2	"Emergencia"	Raúl Arévalo	Raúl Arévalo, Alberto Marini, Fran Araújo	29 September 2022
3	"Confrontación"	Isa Campo	Isa Campo, Fran Araújo	29 September 2022
4	"Supervivencia"	Alberto Rodríguez	Rafael Cobos	29 September 2022
5	"Equilibrio"	Isaki Lacuesta	Isa Campo, Fran Araújo	29 September 2022

== Accolades ==
Year	Award	Category	Nominee(s)	Result	Ref.
2022	28th Forqué Awards	Best TV Series		Won	
2022	28th Forqué Awards	Best TV Actor	Jesús Carroza	Won	
2022	28th Forqué Awards	Best TV Actor	Luis Callejo	Nominated	
2023	10th Feroz Awards	Best Drama Series		Nominated	
2023	10th Feroz Awards	Best Actor in a TV Series	Luis Callejo	Nominated	
2023	10th Feroz Awards	Best Supporting Actor in a TV Series	Jesús Carroza	Nominated	
2023	10th Feroz Awards	Best Screenplay in a TV Series	Isabel Peña, Alberto Marini, Fran Araújo, Rafael Cobos, Isa Campo	Nominated	
2023	31st Actors and Actresses Union Awards	Best Television Actor in a Leading Role	Luis Callejo	Won	
