= 10th Feroz Awards =

Spanish film and television awards

- Date: 28 January 2023
- Site: Auditorio de Zaragoza, Zaragoza
- Hosted by: Paula Púa, Bárbara Santa-Cruz, Ingrid García-Jonsson, Silvia Abril, Nacho Vigalondo, Pilar Castro
- Organized by: Asociación de Informadores Cinematográficos de España

Highlights
- Best Picture: The Beasts (Drama); Official Competition (Comedy)
- Best Direction: Carla Simón; Alcarràs
- Best Actor: Nacho Sánchez; Manticore
- Best Actress: Laia Costa; Lullaby
- Most awards: The Beasts and Lullaby (3 each)
- Most nominations: The Beasts (10)

Television coverage
- Network: YouTube, RTVE Play

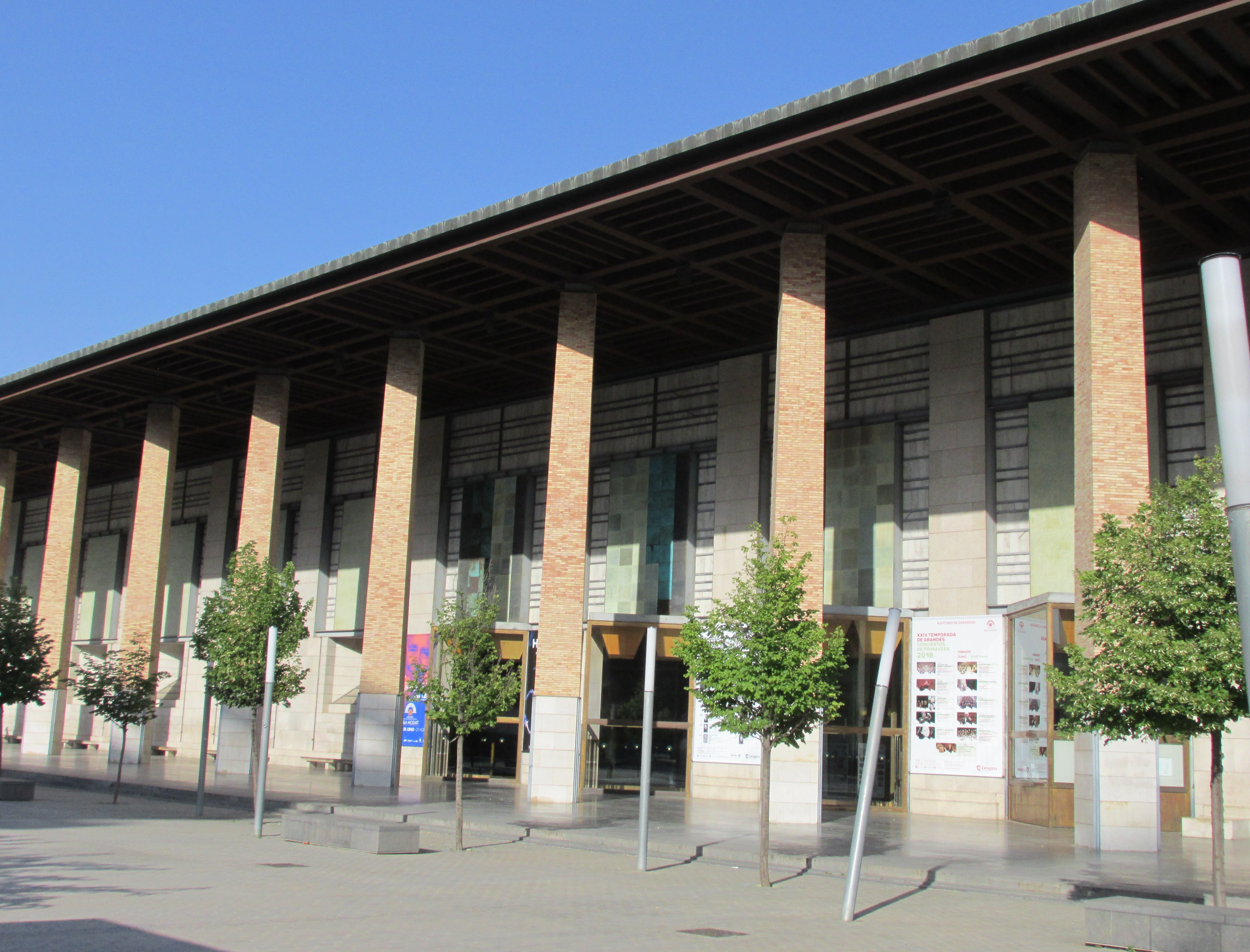
Auditorio de Zaragoza

The 10th Feroz Awards ceremony, presented by the Asociación de Informadores Cinematográficos de España, took place at the Auditorio de Zaragoza in Zaragoza, Spain, on 28 January 2023, to recognize the best in Spanish cinema and television. This marks the second time in a row that the ceremony takes place in Zaragoza.

The nominations were announced by actors Mina El Hammani and Carlos Cuevas through a live-stream from the Pablo Gargallo Museum on 24 November 2022. The category for Best Screenplay in a Series was added. The Beasts led the nominations with ten, followed by Lullaby with seven and Piggy with six, while The Route led the television categories with six nominations. Director Pedro Almodóvar received the Honorary Award. The gala co-hosted by former hosts of previous editions of the Feroz Awards (Paula Púa, Bárbara Santa-Cruz, Ingrid García-Jonsson, Silvia Abril, Nacho Vigalondo, and Pilar Castro).

The Beasts and Lullaby received the most awards of the night with three each, the former also won Best Drama Film. In the television categories, Atresplayer Premium series The Route won three awards, including Best Drama Series.

== Winners and nominees ==
The nominations were announced on 24 November 2022. The nominations for the Feroz Arrebato awards for fiction and non-fiction were announced on 15 December 2022.

=== Film ===
Motion Picture
Drama: The Beasts – Ignasi Estapé, Sandra Tapia, Ibon Cormenzana, Eduardo Villanueva; Alcarràs – Stefan Schmitz, María Zamora, Tono Folguera, Sergi Moreno; Lullaby – Manu Calvo, Nahikari Ipiña, Marisa Fernández Armenteros; Prison 77 – José Antonio Félez, Domingo Corral, Gervasio Iglesias, Alberto Félez; One Year, One Night – Ramón Campos, Teresa Fernández-Valdés, Jerôme Vidal, Isa Campo	Comedy: Official Competition – Jaume Roures; Four's a Crowd – Álex de la Iglesia, Carolina Bang, Álvaro Augustin, Ghislain Barrois; You Have to Come and See It – Javier Lafuente, Jonás Trueba; Vasil – Miriam Porté, Mina Mileva, Vesela Karakova; Voy a pasármelo bien – Enrique López Lavigne, Diego Suárez Chialvo, Pablo Cruz
Best Performance in a Motion Picture
Actor: Nacho Sánchez – Manticore as Julián; Karra Elejalde – Vasil as Alfredo; Miguel Herrán – Prison 77 as Manuel; Denis Ménochet – The Beasts as Antoine; Nahuel Pérez Biscayart – One Year, One Night as Ramón; Luis Tosar – On the Fringe as Rafa	Actress: Laia Costa – Lullaby as Amaia; Anna Castillo – Wild Flowers as Julia; Laura Galán – Piggy as Sara; Marina Foïs – The Beasts as Olga; Carla Quílez – Motherhood as Carla
Best Supporting Performance in a Motion Picture
Supporting Actor: Luis Zahera – The Beasts as Xan; Diego Anido – The Beasts as Lorenzo; Ramón Barea – Lullaby as Koldo; Jesús Carroza – Prison 77 as El Negro; Oriol Pla – Wild Flowers as Óscar	Supporting Actress: Susi Sánchez – Lullaby as Begoña; Adelfa Calvo – On the Fringe as Teodora; Ángela Cervantes – Motherhood as Penélope; Carmen Machi – Piggy as Asun; Emma Suárez – The Rite of Spring as Isabel
Other
Best Director: Carla Simón – Alcarràs; Pilar Palomero – Motherhood; Carlota Pereda – Piggy; Alauda Ruiz de Azúa – Lullaby; Rodrigo Sorogoyen – The Beasts	Best Screenplay: Lullaby – Alauda Ruiz de Azúa; Alcarràs – Carla Simón, Arnau Vilaró; The Beasts – Rodrigo Sorogoyen, Isabel Peña; Piggy – Carlota Pereda; One Year, One Night – Fran Araújo, Isa Campo, Isaki Lacuesta
Best Original Soundtrack: The Beasts – Olivier Arson; Lullaby – Aránzazu Calleja; God's Crooked Lines – Fernando Velázquez; Prison 77 – Julio de la Rosa; One Year, One Night – Raül Refree	Special Award (Non-Fiction Film): La visita y un jardín secreto; ¡Dolores, guapa!; A las mujeres de España. María Lejárraga; Cantando en las azoteas; Pico Reja. La verdad que la tierra esconde
Best Trailer: Piggy – Marta Longás; The Beasts – Miguel Ángel Trudu; Manticore – Miguel Ángel Trudu; Prison 77 – Aitor Tapia; God's Crooked Lines – Pedro J. Bernardo	Best Film Poster: Manticore – Carlos Vermut; The Beasts – Jordi Rins, Lucía Faraig; Piggy – Eduardo García, Jorge Fuembuena; Wild Flowers – Gonzalo Rute, Quim Vive; The Rite of Spring – Mica Murphy
Special Award (Fiction Film): Piety; The Water; My Emptiness and I; Pacifiction; Unicorn Wars

=== Series ===
Best Drama Series: The Route – Montse García, Eduardo Villanueva, Nacho Lavilla; ¡García! – Miguel Salvat, Steve Matthews, Antonio Asensio, Paloma Molina; Offworld – Domingo Corral, Ignacio Corrales, Fran Araújo, Rafael Portela; Intimacy – Marian Fernández Pascal, Jorge Torregrosa, Laura Sarmiento; Rapa – Domingo Corral, Alfonso Blanco, Carla Pérez de Albéniz, Susana Herreras	Best Comedy Series: I Don't Like Driving – Jose Skaf, Guillermo Farré, Nahikari Ipiña, Borja Cobeaga; Autodefensa – Bernat Manzano, Montse Pujol Sola, Miguel Ángel Blanca; Simple – Sandra Hermida, Anna R. Costa, Domingo Corral, Fran Araújo; The Girls at the Back – José Antonio Félez, Cristina Sutherland, Alberto Félez, Daniel Sánchez Arévalo
Best Main Actor: Juan Diego Botto – I Don't Like Driving as Pablo Lopetegui; Luis Callejo – Offworld as Ernesto; Javier Cámara – Rapa as Tomás Hernández; Álex García – El Inmortal. Gangs of Madrid as José Antonio "El Inmortal"; Àlex Monner – The Route as Marc Robé	Best Main Actress: Claudia Salas – The Route as Toni; Nerea Barros – The Gypsy Bride as Elena Blanco; Itziar Ituño – Intimacy as Malen Zubiri; Mónica López – Rapa as Maita Estévez; Nathalie Poza – La unidad as Carla
Best Supporting Actor: David Lorente – I Don't Like Driving as Lorenzo; Jesús Carroza – Offworld as Cortelazor; Ricardo Gómez – The Route as Sento; Emilio Gutiérrez Caba – ¡García! as Jaime Ortiz; Vicente Romero – The Gypsy Bride as Orduño; Luis Zahera – La unidad as Sergio	Best Supporting Actress: Patricia López Arnaiz – Intimacy as Begoña Uribe; Marian Álvarez – La unidad as Miriam; Elisabet Casanovas – The Route as Nuria; Coria Castillo – Simple as Àngels; Lucía Veiga – Rapa as Norma Muiñoz Álvarez; Leonor Watling – I Don't Like Driving as Iria
Best Screenplay in a Series: The Route – Borja Soler, Roberto Martín Maiztegui, Clara Botas, Silvia Herreros de Tejada; Offworld – Isabel Peña, Alberto Marini, Fran Araújo, Rafael Cobos, Isa Campo; Autodefensa – Berta Prieto, Belén Barenys, Miguel Ángel Blanca; Simple – Anna R. Costa, Cristina Pons; Intimacy – Verónica Fernández, Laura Sarmiento, José Luis Martín

=== Honorary Award ===
- Pedro Almodóvar

== See also ==
- 37th Goya Awards
- 15th Gaudí Awards
- 2nd Carmen Awards
