= 31st Actors and Actresses Union Awards =

2023 Spanish award ceremony

- Date: 13 March 2023
- Site: Circo Price, Madrid, Spain
- Organized by: Actors and Actresses Union

Highlights
- Honorary career award: Lola Herrera

The 31st Actors and Actresses Union Awards ceremony was held on 13 March 2023 at the Circo Price in Madrid.

In addition to the competitive awards, the Ministry of Equality received the 'Mujeres en Unión' award, whilst Lola Herrera was bestowed the 'A toda una vida' life achievement career award.

== Winners and nominees ==
The winners and nominees are listed as follows:

=== Film ===
Best Male Performance in a Leading Role: Denis Menochet — The Beasts as Antoine; Javier Gutiérrez — Prison 77 as José Pino; Miguel Herrán — Prison 77 as Manuel	Best Female Performance in a Leading Role: Laia Costa — Lullaby as Amaia; Bárbara Lennie — God's Crooked Lines as Alice Gould; Marina Foïs — The Beasts as Olga
Best Male Performance in a Secondary Role: Luis Zahera — The Beasts as Xan; Fernando Tejero — Prison 77 as Marbella; Pedro Casablanc — Oliver's Universe as Gabriel	Best Female Performance in a Secondary Role: Susi Sánchez — Lullaby as Begoña; Ángela Cervantes — Motherhood as Penélope; Carmen Machi — Piggy as Asun
Best Male Performance in a Minor Role: Ramón Barea — Lullaby as Koldo; Manolo Solo — Wild Flowers as Roberto; Unax Ugalde — The Man from Rome as Father Arregui	Best Female Performance in a Minor Role: Adelfa Calvo — On the Fringe as Teodora; Emma Suárez — The Rite of Spring as Isabel; Marie Colomb — The Beasts as Marie

=== Television ===
Best Male Performance in a Leading Role: Luis Callejo — Offworld as Ernesto; Álex García — El Inmortal. Gangs of Madrid as José Antonio "El Inmortal"; Javier Cámara — Rapa as Tomás Hernández	Best Female Performance in a Leading Role: Nathalie Poza — La unidad as Carla; Ana Rujas — Cardo as María; Mariona Terés — The Girls at the Back as Leo
Best Male Performance in a Secondary Role: Manolo Caro — Wrong Side of the Tracks as Sanchís; Carlos Cuevas — Stories to Stay Awake as Javier; Ricardo Gómez — The Route as Sento	Best Female Performance in a Secondary Role: Beatriz Carvajal — Laura y el misterio del asesino inesperado as Maribel del Bosque; Carmen Ruiz — Amar es para siempre as Penélope Valdivia; Mamen Camacho — Servir y proteger as Esperanza "Espe" Beltrán García
Best Male Performance in a Minor Role: Iñaki Miramón — Amar es para siempre as Justo Quintero; Arturo Querejeta — ¡García! as Aquilino; Luis Rallo — ¡García! as Verdú	Best Female Performance in a Minor Role: Yassmine Othman — La unidad as Naima; Anna Moliner — Heirs to the Land as Margarida Puig; Elisabeth Larena — Intimacy as Idoia

=== Theatre ===
Best Male Performance in a Leading Role: Alberto Velasco — Sweet Dreams; Álex Villazán — Equus; Carlos Hipólito — Oceanía	Best Female Performance in a Leading Role: Blanca Portillo — Silencio; Aitana Sánchez-Gijón — Malvivir; Marta Poveda — Malvivir
Best Male Performance in a Secondary Role: Luis Bermejo — Los santos innocentes; Agustín Jiménez — Un Oscar para Óscar; Alberto Berzal — Los despiertos	Best Female Performance in a Secondary Role: Zaira Montes — La casa de Bernarda Alba; Lucía Fuengallego — Tito Andrónico; Claudia Galán — Equus
Best Male Performance in a Minor Role: Rafa Castejón — El burlador de Sevilla; Carlos Serrano-Clark — Muerte de un viajante; Jorge Varandela — El burlador de Sevilla	Best Female Performance in a Minor Role: Verónica Ronda — Lo fingido verdadero; Carmen Mayordomo — Robots universales Rossum; Montse Peidro — La casa de Bernarda Alba

=== Newcomers ===
Best New Actor: Diego Anido — The Beasts as Lorenzo; Christian Checa — On the Fringe as Raúl; Mikel Bustamante — Lullaby as Javi	Best New Actress: Laura Galán — Piggy as Sara; África de la Cruz — The Gentiles as Ana; Nakarey — El que sabem

=== International productions ===
Best Male Performance in an International Production: Javier Bardem — Being the Ricardos as Desi Arnaz; Abdelatif Hwidar — The Crown as Ali-Ali Al-Fayed; Hugo Silva — Top Boy as Emilio	Best Female Performance in an International Production: Ana de Armas — Blonde as Norma Jeane / Marilyn Monroe; Clara Lago — Limbo as Sofía "Sou" Castelló; Penélope Cruz — L'immensità as Clara
