= 28th Forqué Awards =

2022 Spanish film and television awards

- Date: 17 December 2022
- Site: IFEMA Palacio Municipal, Madrid, Spain
- Hosted by: Esmeralda Pimentel; Adrián Lastra
- Organized by: EGEDA

Highlights
- Best Picture: The Beasts
- Best Actor: Denis Ménochet; The Beasts
- Best Actress: Laia Costa; Lullaby

Television coverage
- Network: La 2, RTVE Play

The 28th Forqué Awards, organised by EGEDA, were presented on 17 December 2022 at the IFEMA Palacio Municipal in Madrid.

== Background ==
The ceremony paid homage to the career of Verónica Forqué, died in December 2021. The nominations were read by Álvaro Rico, Amaia Salamanca, Eduardo Noriega, Macarena García, and Luc Knowles on 7 November 2022 at Madrid's Cine Capitol. Later in November, Esmeralda Pimentel and Adrián Lastra were announced as the hosts of the gala.

Producer José Luis Bermúdez de Castro was gifted the EGEDA Gold Medal recognizing his lifetime achievements in the Spanish audiovisual industry.

== Categories ==
The winners and nominees are listed as follows:

Best Fiction or Animation Film: The Beasts; Alcarràs; Lullaby; Prison 77	Best Fiction Series: Offworld; Stories to Stay Awake; La unidad; Rapa
Best Male Performance in a Film: Denis Ménochet — The Beasts; Luis Tosar — On the Fringe; Miguel Herrán — Prison 77; Nacho Sánchez — Manticore	Best Female Performance in a Film: Laia Costa — Lullaby; Anna Castillo — Wild Flowers; Laura Galán — Piggy; Susi Sánchez — Lullaby
Best Male Performance in a Series: Jesús Carroza — Offworld; Javier Cámara — Rapa; Luis Callejo — Offworld; Luis Zahera — Wrong Side of the Tracks	Best Female Performance in a Series: Mónica López — Rapa; Anna Castillo — Simple; Itziar Ituño — Intimacy; Natalia de Molina — Simple
Best Documentary Film: Labordeta, un hombre sin más; A las mujeres de España. María Lejárraga; [REC] Terror sin pausa; Sintiéndolo mucho	Best Latin-American Film: Argentina, 1985; Birthday Boy; The Punishment; Utama
Best Short Film: Chords; Au pair; Tótem Loba	Cinema and Education in Values: Lullaby; Alcarràs; On the Fringe; The Rite of Spring
