= Lullaby (2022 film) =

Film by Alauda Ruiz de Azúa

- Theatrical release poster
- Spanish: Cinco lobitos
- Directed by: Alauda Ruiz de Azúa
- Written by: Alauda Ruiz de Azúa
- Produced by: Manu Calvo; Nahikari Ipiña; Marisa Fernández Armenteros
- Starring: Laia Costa; Susi Sánchez; Ramón Barea; Mikel Bustamante
- Cinematography: Jon D. Domínguez
- Edited by: Andrés Gil
- Music by: Aránzazu Calleja
- Production companies: Encanta Films; Sayaka Producciones; Buenapinta Media
- Distributed by: BTeam Pictures
- Release dates: 11 February 2022 (Berlinale); 20 May 2022 (Spain)
- Running time: 104 minutes
- Country: Spain
- Languages: Spanish; Basque; English

Lullaby (Spanish: Cinco lobitos, lit. 'Five Wolf Cubs') is a 2022 Spanish drama film written and directed by Alauda Ruiz de Azúa. It stars Laia Costa and Susi Sánchez alongside Ramón Barea and Mikel Bustamante.

It premiered at the 72nd Berlin International Film Festival in February 2022 ahead of its Golden Biznaga-winning run at the 25th Málaga Film Festival and its 20 May 2022 theatrical release in Spain by BTeam Pictures.

== Premise ==
After giving birth Amaia returns to her parents' home as her partner is away for some time.

== Cast ==
- Laia Costa as Amaia
- Mikel Bustamante as Javi
- Susi Sánchez as Begoña
- Ramón Barea as Koldo
- José Ramón Soroiz as Iñaki

== Production ==
The project underwent development at the ECAM's incubator program. The film was produced by Encanta Films, Sayaka Producciones and BuenaPinta Media, and it had the participation of RTVE, EiTB and Orange and funding from ICAA, the Basque Government, the Madrid regional administration and Crea SGR. Shooting lasted for 5 weeks and it took place in between Madrid and Biscay (Mundaka and Bakio). In addition to Spanish, it also features Basque- and English-language dialogue.

== Release ==
The film had its world premiere in February 2022, screened as part of the 72nd Berlin International Film Festival's Panorama section. It also screened at the 25th Málaga Film Festival on 20 March 2022 as part of the festival's main competition. Distributed by BTeam Pictures, it was theatrically released in Spain on 20 May 2022.

== Reception ==
=== Reception ===
According to the review aggregation website Rotten Tomatoes, Lullaby has a 100% approval rating based on 19 reviews from critics, with an average rating of 8.3/10.

Jonathan Holland of ScreenDaily presented the film as an "absorbing mother-daughter drama set on the Basque coast", deeming it to be strongest "in the subtle and compassionate characterisation of its women".

Pere Vall of Fotogramas rated the film 4 out of 5 stars, highlighting the "absence of broad-brush" and the "duel/deal" between the "grandiose" Laia Costa and Susi Sánchez.

Irene Crespo of Cinemanía also gave it 4 out of 5 stars, summarizing the film as "a brilliant and emotional debut beyond motherhood" in her verdict.

Spanish film director Pedro Almodóvar called the film "undoubtedly the best debut in Spanish cinema for years", expressing the mother-daughter relationship as "a portrait of the role of women within the family, which is truthful, devoid of sentimentality and that does not exclude humor" and highlighting the performance of Laia Costa.

In August 2022, the members of the Academy of Cinematographic Arts and Sciences of Spain selected Lullaby in their shortlist of three pre-selections for their submission to the 95th Academy Awards for Best International Feature Film alongside Alcarràs and The Beasts.

=== Top ten lists ===
The film appeared on a number of critics' top ten lists of the best Spanish films of 2022:

- 2nd — El Español ('Series&más' critics)
- 3rd — Vanity Fair (Juan Sanguino & Paloma Rando)
- 5th — Cadena SER ('El cine en la SER' critics)
- 5th — El Cultural (Begoña Donat)
- 5th — El Confidencial (Marta Medina)
- 6th — El Cultural (Carlos Heredero)
- 6th — ABC (Oti Rodríguez Marchante)
- 7th — El Mundo (Luis Martínez)
- 8th — El Cultural (Carlos Reviriego)
- 8th — El Cultural (Javier Yuste)
- 8th — El Periódico de Catalunya (critics)

=== Accolades ===
Year	Award	Category	Nominee(s)	Result	Ref.
2022	25th Málaga Film Festival	Golden Biznaga for Best Spanish Film		Won	
2022	25th Málaga Film Festival	Best Actress	Laia Costa & Susi Sánchez	Won	
2022	25th Málaga Film Festival	Best Screenplay	Alauda Ruiz de Azúa	Won	
2022	25th Málaga Film Festival	Audience Choice Award		Won	
2022	28th Forqué Awards	Best Film		Nominated	
2022	28th Forqué Awards	Best Film Actress	Laia Costa	Won	
2022	28th Forqué Awards	Best Film Actress	Susi Sánchez	Nominated	
2022	28th Forqué Awards	Cinema and Education in Values		Won	
2023	15th Gaudí Awards	Best European Film		Won	
2023	10th Feroz Awards	Best Drama Film		Nominated	
2023	10th Feroz Awards	Best Director	Alauda Ruiz de Azúa	Nominated	
2023	10th Feroz Awards	Best Screenplay	Alauda Ruiz de Azúa	Won	
2023	10th Feroz Awards	Best Actress in a Film	Laia Costa	Won	
2023	10th Feroz Awards	Best Supporting Actress in a Film	Susi Sánchez	Won	
2023	10th Feroz Awards	Best Supporting Actor in a Film	Ramón Barea	Nominated	
2023	10th Feroz Awards	Best Soundtrack	Aránzazu Calleja	Nominated	
2023	2nd Carmen Awards	Best Non-Andalusian Film		Nominated	
2023	78th CEC Medals	Best Film		Nominated	
2023	78th CEC Medals	Best New Director	Alauda Ruiz de Azúa	Won	
2023	78th CEC Medals	Best Actress	Laia Costa	Nominated	
2023	78th CEC Medals	Best Supporting Actress	Susi Sánchez	Won	
2023	78th CEC Medals	Best Supporting Actor	Ramón Barea	Nominated	
2023	78th CEC Medals	Best New Actor	Mikel Bustamante	Nominated	
2023	78th CEC Medals	Best Original Screenplay	Alauda Ruiz de Azúa	Nominated	
2023	78th CEC Medals	Best Cinematography	Jon D. Domínguez	Nominated	
2023	78th CEC Medals	Best Editing	Andrés Gil	Nominated	
2023	37th Goya Awards	Best Film		Nominated	
2023	37th Goya Awards	Best New Director	Alauda Ruiz de Azúa	Won	
2023	37th Goya Awards	Best Original Screenplay	Alauda Ruiz de Azúa	Nominated	
2023	37th Goya Awards	Best Actress	Laia Costa	Won	
2023	37th Goya Awards	Best Supporting Actress	Susi Sánchez	Won	
2023	37th Goya Awards	Best Supporting Actor	Ramón Barea	Nominated	
2023	37th Goya Awards	Best New Actor	Mikel Bustamante	Nominated	
2023	37th Goya Awards	Best Cinematography	Jon D. Domínguez	Nominated	
2023	37th Goya Awards	Best Editing	Andrés Gil	Nominated	
2023	37th Goya Awards	Best Sound	Asier González, Eva de la Fuente López, Roberto Fernández	Nominated	
2023	37th Goya Awards	Best Production Supervision	María José Díez	Nominated	
2023	31st Actors and Actresses Union Awards	Best Film Actress in a Leading Role	Laia Costa	Won	
2023	31st Actors and Actresses Union Awards	Best Film Actress in a Secondary Role	Susi Sánchez	Won	
2023	31st Actors and Actresses Union Awards	Best Film Actor in a Minor Role	Ramón Barea	Won	
2023	31st Actors and Actresses Union Awards	Best New Actor	Mikel Bustamante	Nominated	
2023	10th Platino Awards	Best Actress	Laia Costa	Won	
2023	10th Platino Awards	Best Supporting Actress	Susi Sánchez	Won	
2023	10th Platino Awards	Best Supporting Actor	Ramón Barea	Nominated	
2023	10th Platino Awards	Best Original Score	Aránzazu Calleja	Nominated	
2023	10th Platino Awards	Best Ibero-American Debut Film		Nominated	
2023	10th Platino Awards	Cinema and Values Education		Nominated	

== See also ==
- List of Spanish films of 2022
