= Prison 77 =

- Theatrical release poster
- Spanish: Modelo 77
- Directed by: Alberto Rodríguez
- Written by: Rafael Cobos; Alberto Rodríguez
- Starring: Miguel Herrán; Javier Gutiérrez; Jesús Carroza; Catalina Sopelana; Xavi Sáez; Fernando Tejero
- Cinematography: Álex Catalán
- Edited by: José M. G. Moyano
- Music by: Julio de la Rosa
- Production companies: Movistar Plus+; Atípica Films
- Distributed by: Buena Vista International
- Release dates: 16 September 2022 (Zinemaldia); 23 September 2022 (Spain)
- Country: Spain
- Language: Spanish
- Box office: €2.1 million

Prison 77 (Spanish: Modelo 77) is a 2022 Spanish historical thriller drama film directed by Alberto Rodríguez from a screenplay co-written with Rafael Cobos which stars Miguel Herrán and Javier Gutiérrez.

Set in the late 1970s in Barcelona's Modelo Prison, the plot consists of a critical revision of the so-called Transition in Spain, focusing on the plight of inmates imprisoned on common charges claiming for an amnesty that, unlike the case of fellow political prisoners, never came to pass.

The film opened the 70th San Sebastián International Film Festival on 16 September 2022, to be released theatrically in Spain a week later.

It earned 16 nominations at the 37th Goya Awards, winning in five technical categories.

== Plot ==
Taking place from 1976 to 1978, during the so-called Transition, the plot is inspired by the real attempted prison break from Barcelona's Cárcel Modelo attempted by 45 inmates in 1978, after a rebellion led by the Coordinadora de presos en lucha (COPEL). The fiction follows two of the prisoners, José Pino and Manuel, an aged inmate who has passed through several prisons and a young accounting assistant who has just entered the prison, respectively.

== Cast ==
- Miguel Herrán as Manuel
- Javier Gutiérrez as José Pino
- Jesús Carroza as El Negro
- Fernando Tejero as Marbella
- Catalina Sopelana as Lucía
- Xavi Sáez as Boni
- Alfonso Lara as El Demócrata
- Polo Camino as Rubí
- Víctor Castilla as Rompetechos
- Iñigo Aranburu as Andrés
- Javier Lago as Domingo
- Iñigo de la Iglesia as Agustín
- Javier Beltrán as Arnau Solsona

== Production ==
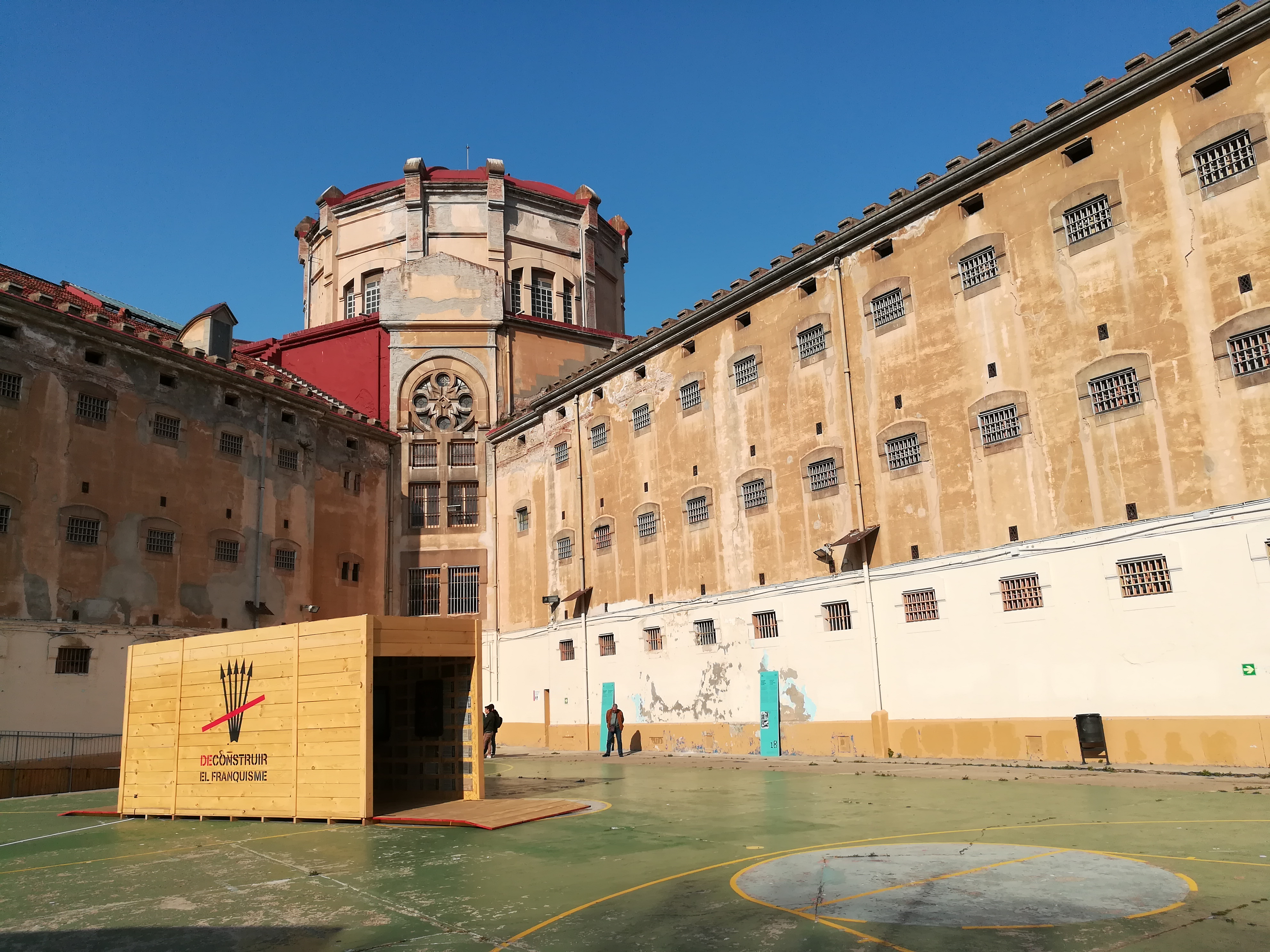
The building of the old Modelo Prison was a prime shooting location.

The screenplay was co-written by the director Alberto Rodríguez alongside his customary scribe Rafael Cobos. The film is a Movistar Plus+ and Atípica Films production. The crew featured other recurring Alberto Rodríguez' collaborators such as Álex Catalán (cinematographer), Pepe Domínguez del Olmo (art director), José G. Moyano (editing) and Julio de la Rosa (composer).

Filming started in Barcelona on 2 August 2021, using the actual Model Prison as shooting location. The first phase of filming was completed in late August 2021. Production then moved for the second and final phase to the province of Seville, wrapping on 4 October 2021.

== Release ==
Prison 77 screened out of competition as the opening film of the 70th San Sebastián International Film Festival on 16 September 2022. Distributed by Buena Vista International, the film was theatrically released in Spain on 23 September 2022. It had an in-year gross of €2.1 million. It will later be released on Movistar Plus+. It also made it to the 'World Cinema' section of 27th Busan International Film Festival. The film was invited to the 28th Kolkata International Film Festival (screening on 18 December 2022) as well as to the 27th International Film Festival of Kerala. TelevisaUnivision obtained rights to the film in Mexico, the United States, and Latin America, with a streaming debut on Vix+ scheduled for 22 March 2023.

== Reception ==
On the review aggregator website Rotten Tomatoes, 100% of 7 critics' reviews are positive, with an average rating of 8.0/10.

Andrea G. Bermejo of Cinemanía rated the film 4 out of 5 stars, concluding that some of the best performances of the year are present in the film, with the entire cast being "in deep communion with the story they want to tell".

Raquel Hernández Luján of HobbyConsolas rated it with 80 out of 100 points ("very good"), deeming the film to be "respectful of the harsh reality it portrays and at the same time [it] manages to take the story out of the corset of prison dramas".

Àlex Montoya of Fotogramas rated the film 4 out of 5 stars praising the "rigor and critical thinking at the service of entertainment, or vice versa. And the cast. All of it".

Fionnuala Halligan of ScreenDaily considered that the film features a Hunger-like depiction of "horrible injustice", displaying "a striking camera-work and fantastic costuming [that] can only hold the eye for so long as beating follows beating".

=== Top ten lists ===
The film appeared on a number of critics' top ten lists of the best Spanish films of 2022:

- 4th — Cadena SER (Elio Castro)
- 6th — El Español ('Series&más' critics)
- 8th — Cadena SER ('El cine en la SER' critics)
- 8th — Cadena SER (Pepa Blanes)
- 10th — El Cultural (Begoña Donat)
- 10th — El Cultural (Juan Sardá)

== Accolades ==
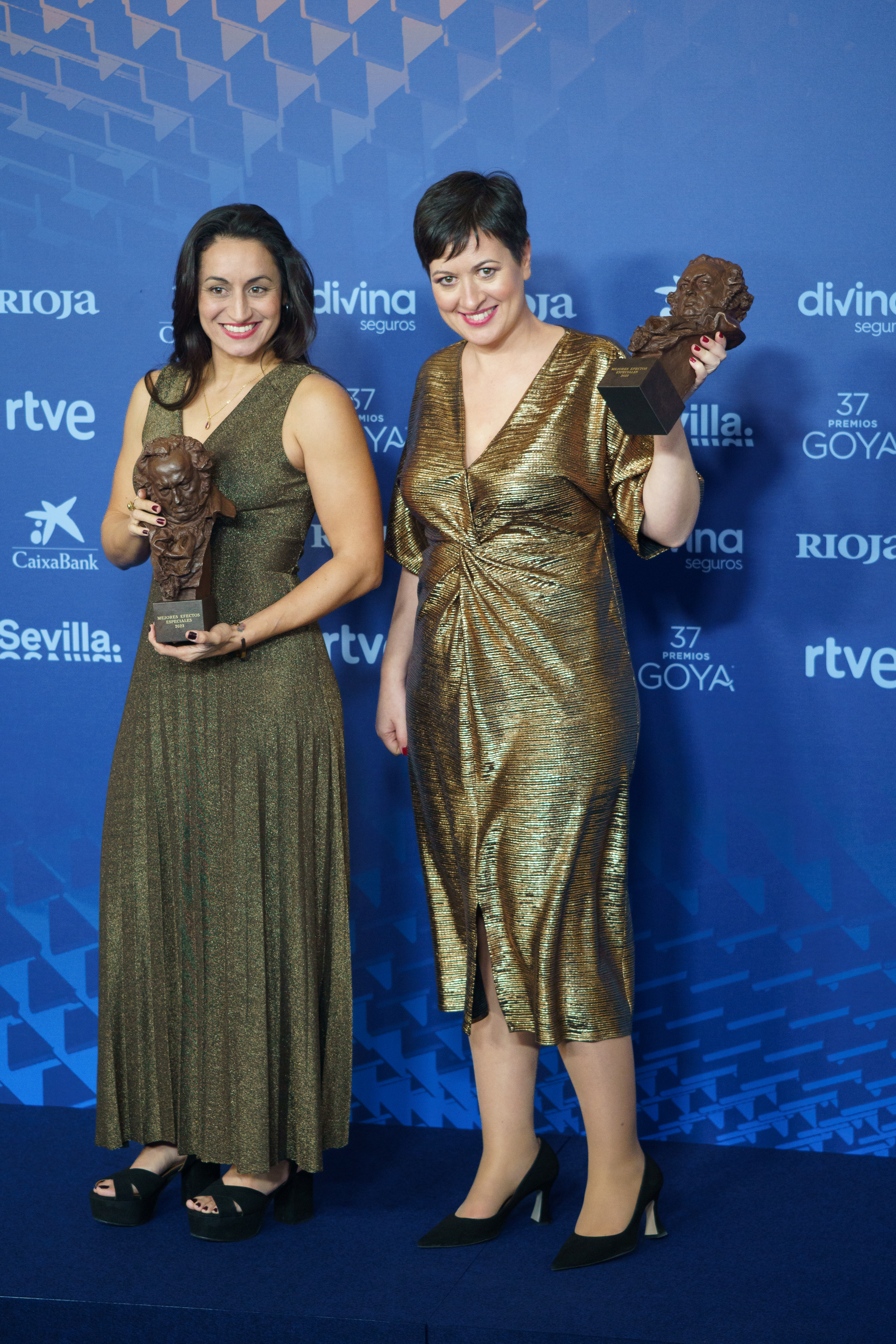
Esther Ballesteros and Ana Rubio holding their Goya Awards for Best Special Effects in 2023

Year	Award	Category	Nominee(s)	Result	Ref.
2022	28th Forqué Awards	Best Film		Nominated	
2022	28th Forqué Awards	Best Film Actor	Miguel Herrán	Nominated	
2023	10th Feroz Awards	Best Drama Film		Nominated	
2023	10th Feroz Awards	Best Actor in a Film	Miguel Herrán	Nominated	
2023	10th Feroz Awards	Best Supporting Actor in a Film	Jesús Carroza	Nominated	
2023	10th Feroz Awards	Best Soundtrack	Julio de la Rosa	Nominated	
2023	10th Feroz Awards	Best Trailer	Aitor Tapia	Nominated	
2023	2nd Carmen Awards	Best Film		Won	
2023	2nd Carmen Awards	Best Director	Alberto Rodríguez	Won	
2023	2nd Carmen Awards	Best Original Screenplay	Rafael Cobos, Alberto Rodríguez	Won	
2023	2nd Carmen Awards	Best Actor	Miguel Herrán	Won	
2023	2nd Carmen Awards	Best Supporting Actor	Fernando Tejero	Nominated	
2023	2nd Carmen Awards	Best Supporting Actor	Jesús Carroza	Won	
2023	2nd Carmen Awards	Best Editing	José M. G. Moyano	Won	
2023	2nd Carmen Awards	Best Art Direction	Pepe Domínguez del Olmo	Won	
2023	2nd Carmen Awards	Best Cinematography	Álex Catalán	Won	
2023	2nd Carmen Awards	Best Production Supervision	Manuela Ocón Aburto	Won	
2023	2nd Carmen Awards	Best Original Score	Julio de la Rosa	Won	
2023	2nd Carmen Awards	Best Costume Design	Fernando García	Won	
2023	2nd Carmen Awards	Best Makeup and Hairstyles	Yolanda Piña, Félix Terreno	Won	
2023	2nd Carmen Awards	Best Sound	Dani de Zayas, Miguel Huete, Valeria Arcieri	Won	
2023	78th CEC Medals	Best Film		Nominated	
2023	78th CEC Medals	Best Actor	Javier Gutiérrez	Nominated	
2023	78th CEC Medals	Best Actor	Miguel Herrán	Nominated	
2023	78th CEC Medals	Best Original Screenplay	Alberto Rodríguez, Rafael Cobos	Nominated	
2023	78th CEC Medals	Best Cinematography	Álex Catalán	Nominated	
2023	78th CEC Medals	Best Editing	José M.G. Moyano	Nominated	
2023	78th CEC Medals	Best Music	Julio de la Rosa	Nominated	
2023	37th Goya Awards	Best Film		Nominated	
2023	37th Goya Awards	Best Director	Alberto Rodríguez	Nominated	
2023	37th Goya Awards	Best Original Screenplay	Alberto Rodríguez, Rafael Cobos	Nominated	
2023	37th Goya Awards	Best Actor	Miguel Herrán	Nominated	
2023	37th Goya Awards	Best Actor	Javier Gutiérrez	Nominated	
2023	37th Goya Awards	Best Supporting Actor	Fernando Tejero	Nominated	
2023	37th Goya Awards	Best Supporting Actor	Jesús Carroza	Nominated	
2023	37th Goya Awards	Best Cinematography	Álex Catalán	Nominated	
2023	37th Goya Awards	Best Editing	José M. G. Moyano	Nominated	
2023	37th Goya Awards	Best Original Score	Julio de la Rosa	Nominated	
2023	37th Goya Awards	Best Sound	Daniel de Zayas, Miguel Huete, Pelayo Gutiérrez, Valeria Arcieri	Nominated	
2023	37th Goya Awards	Best Art Direction	Pepe Domínguez del Olmo	Won	
2023	37th Goya Awards	Best Costume Design	Fernando García	Won	
2023	37th Goya Awards	Best Makeup and Hairstyles	Yolanda Piña, Félix Terrero	Won	
2023	37th Goya Awards	Best Special Effects	Esther Ballesteros, Ana Rubio	Won	
2023	37th Goya Awards	Best Production Supervision	Manuela Ocón Aburto	Won	
2023	31st Actors and Actresses Union Awards	Best Film Actor in a Leading Role	Javier Gutiérrez	Nominated	
2023	31st Actors and Actresses Union Awards	Best Film Actor in a Leading Role	Miguel Herrán	Nominated	
2023	31st Actors and Actresses Union Awards	Best Film Actor in a Secondary Role	Fernando Tejero	Nominated	
2023	10th Platino Awards	Best Film Editing	José M. G. Moyano	Nominated	
2023	10th Platino Awards	Best Art Direction	Pepe Domínguez del Olmo	Nominated	

== See also ==
- List of Spanish films of 2022
