= One Year, One Night =

- Spanish theatrical release poster
- Spanish: Un año, una noche
- Directed by: Isaki Lacuesta
- Screenplay by: Fran Araújo; Isa Campo; Isaki Lacuesta
- Based on: Paz, amor y death metal by Ramón González
- Produced by: Ramón Campos; Teresa Fernández-Valdés; Jérôme Vidal; Isaki Lacuesta; Isa Campo
- Starring: Nahuel Pérez Biscayart; Noémie Merlant; Quim Gutiérrez; Alba Guilera; Natalia de Molina; C.Tangana
- Cinematography: Irina Lubtchansky
- Edited by: Fernando Franco; Sergi Dies
- Music by: Raül Refree
- Production companies: Mr Fields and Friends; Bambú Producciones; La Termita Films; Noodles Production
- Distributed by: BTeam Pictures (Spain); StudioCanal (France)
- Release dates: 14 February 2022 (Berlinale); 21 October 2022 (Spain); 3 May 2023 (France)
- Countries: Spain; France
- Languages: French; Spanish

One Year, One Night (Spanish: Un año, una noche) is a 2022 drama film directed by Isaki Lacuesta starring Nahuel Pérez Biscayart and Noémie Merlant. Inspired on the book Paz, amor y death metal by Ramón González, it explores trauma in the aftermath of the Bataclan theatre massacre.

It premiered at the 72nd Berlin International Film Festival on 14 February 2022.

== Plot ==
Following Ramón and Céline, survivors of the Bataclan theatre massacre, the plot goes back and forth between the night of the attack at the Bataclan and the trauma experienced in the year thereafter.

== Cast ==
- Nahuel Pérez Biscayart as Ramón
- Noémie Merlant as Céline
- Quim Gutiérrez as Carlos
- Alba Guilera as Lucie
- Natalia de Molina as Julia
- C. Tangana as Héctor
- Enric Auquer as Waiter
- Blanca Apilánez as Ramón's Mother
- Bruno Todeschini as Céline's Father
- Sophie Broustal as Céline's Mother

== Production ==
Based on the book Paz, amor y death metal by Ramón González, the screenplay was written by Fran Araújo, Isa Campo and Isaki Lacuesta.

Ramón Campos, Teresa Fernández-Valdés, Jérôme Vidal, Isaki Lacuesta, and Isa Campo took over production duties.

The score was composed by Refree. The film is a Mr Fields and Friends, Bambú Producciones, La Termita Films and Noodles Production production, with the participation of TVE, Movistar+, TVC, and support from ICAA, ICEC and Eurimages. Filming began on 8 February 2021 in Barcelona. Shooting later moved to Paris.

== Release ==
The film premiered on 14 February 2022, screened at Berlinale Palast as part of the 72nd Berlin International Film Festival's main competition. BTeam Pictures distributed the film in Spain, where it was released on 21 October 2022. The French theatrical release was set to 3 May 2023.

== Reception ==
One Year, One Night received generally positive reviews from film critics. It holds a 77% approval rating on review aggregator website Rotten Tomatoes based on 13 reviews, with an average rating of 7.90/10.

Jonathan Holland of Screendaily considered the film to be "an emotionally compelling psychological drama", bringing some of Lacuesta's hallmarks, including a quasi-documentary style and a deep compassion for the unfortunate.

Anna Smith of Deadline deemed the film to remain "a powerful, bittersweet meditation on the impact of trauma and the desire not to be defined by it".

=== Top ten lists ===
The film appeared on a number of critics' top ten lists of the best Spanish films of 2022:

- 2nd — Cadena SER (Jose M. Romero)
- 3rd — El Cultural (Carlos Heredero)
- 4th — El Periódico de Catalunya (critics)
- 5th — El Cultural (Mariona Burrull)
- 5th — Cadena SER (Pepa Blanes)
- 5th — El Mundo (Luis Martínez)
- 5th — Vanity Fair (Juan Sanguino & Paloma Rando)
- 6th — Cadena SER ('El cine en la SER' critics)
- 6th — El Cultural (Manu Yáñez)
- 7th — El Español ('Series&más' critics)
- 9th — El Cultural (Begoña Donat)
- 9th — El Cultural (Javier Yuste)

=== Accolades ===
| Year | Award | Category | Nominee(s) | Result | Ref. |
|---|---|---|---|---|---|
| 2023 | 15th Gaudí Awards | Best Non-Catalan Language Film | | Nominated | |
| 2023 | 15th Gaudí Awards | Best Director | Isaki Lacuesta | Nominated | |
| 2023 | 15th Gaudí Awards | Best Actress | Noémie Merlant | Nominated | |
| 2023 | 15th Gaudí Awards | Best Actor | Nahuel Pérez Biscayart | Nominated | |
| 2023 | 15th Gaudí Awards | Best Supporting Actor | Enric Auquer | Nominated | |
| 2023 | 15th Gaudí Awards | Best Adapted Screenplay | Isa Campo, Isaki Lacuesta, Fran Araujo | Won | |
| 2023 | 15th Gaudí Awards | Best Production Supervision | Laia Coll | Nominated | |
| 2023 | 15th Gaudí Awards | Best Art Direction | Laia Colet | Nominated | |
| 2023 | 15th Gaudí Awards | Best Editing | Sergi Dies, Fernando Franco | Won | |
| 2023 | 15th Gaudí Awards | Best Original Score | Raül Refree | Won | |
| 2023 | 15th Gaudí Awards | Best Cinematography | Irina Lubtchansky | Nominated | |
| 2023 | 15th Gaudí Awards | Best Sound | Amanda Villavieja, Eva Valiño, Alejandro Castillo, Marc Orts | Won | |
| 2023 | 15th Gaudí Awards | Best Visual Effects | Laura Pedro | Won | |
| 2023 | 15th Gaudí Awards | Best Makeup and Hairstyles | Alma Casal, Virginie Berland, Milou Sanner | Nominated | |
| 2023 | 10th Feroz Awards | Best Drama Film | | Nominated | |
| 2023 | 10th Feroz Awards | Best Screenplay | Fran Araújo, Isa Campo, Isaki Lacuesta | Nominated | |
| 2023 | 10th Feroz Awards | Best Actor in a Film | Nahuel Pérez Biscayart | Nominated | |
| 2023 | 10th Feroz Awards | Best Soundtrack | Raül Refree | Nominated | |
| 2023 | 78th CEC Medals | Best Adapted Screenplay | Isa Campo, Isaki Lacuesta, Fran Araújo | Nominated | |
| 2023 | 37th Goya Awards | Best Adapted Screenplay | Fran Araújo, Isa Campo, Isaki Lacuesta | Won | |
| 2023 | 37th Goya Awards | Best Editing | Fernando Franco, Sergi Díes | Nominated | |
| 2023 | 37th Goya Awards | Best Sound | Amanda Villavieja, Eva Valiño, Marc Orts, Alejandro Castillo | Nominated | |

== See also ==
- List of Spanish films of 2022
- List of French films of 2023
