= Simple (TV series) =

Spanish comedy television series

- Promotional poster
- Spanish: Fácil
- Created by: Anna R. Costa
- Based on: Lectura fácil by Cristina Morales
- Screenplay by: Anna R. Costa; Cristina Pons
- Directed by: Anna R. Costa; Laura Jou
- Starring: Anna Castillo; Natalia de Molina; Anna Marchesi; Coria Castillo
- Country of origin: Spain
- Original language: Spanish
- No. of seasons: 1
- No. of episodes: 5

Production
- Producer: Sandra Hermida
- Running time: 30 min (approx.)
- Production companies: Movistar Plus+; Destrucción y Salvación

Original release
- Network: Movistar Plus+
- Release: 1 December 2022

Simple (Spanish: Fácil) is a 2022 Spanish comedy television series created by Anna R. Costa for Movistar Plus+ based on the book Easy Reading by Cristina Morales. It stars Natalia de Molina, Anna Castillo, Anna Marchessi, and Coria Castillo as four women with functional diversity trying to live in an apartment in La Barceloneta.

== Plot ==
The plot concerns about the mishaps of four women with functional diversity (Nati, Marga, Patri, and Àngels) trying to live in a supervised apartment in La Barceloneta.

== Cast ==
- Anna Castillo as Nati
- Natalia de Molina as Marga
- Anna Marchesi as Patri
- Coria Castillo as Àngels
- Bruna Cusí as Laia Buedo
- Martí Cordero as Kevin
- Eloi Costa
- Cesca Piñón
- Clara Segura
- Ágata Roca
- David Bagés
- Albert Pla

== Production ==
Simple is based on the book Lectura fácil by Cristina Morales. Consisting of 5 episodes featuring an average running time of 30 minutes, it is a Movistar Plus+ original series, produced in collaboration with Destrucción y Salvación. Sandra Hermida is credited as producer. The series was shot in late 2021 in Barcelona, including locations such as La Barceloneta Beach, Rambla de Catalunya, el Raval or the Montjuïc Cable Car.

== Release ==
The series was presented at the 70th San Sebastián International Film Festival on 20 September 2022. It will debut on Movistar Plus+ on 1 December 2022. Beta Film nabbed the international distribution rights.

== Reception ==
Enric Albero of El Cultural pointed out that the series ("a luminous comedy that reduces the ideological feverishness of the original") comes nowhere near the incendiary nature of the source material, even if it incorporates some political (anti-establishment) charge via the characters of Marga and, particularly, Nati, with the series otherwise managing to balance points of view and display an "agile" pace.

=== Reaction by Morales and answer by Costa ===
The author of the original work, Cristina Morales (using the pen name 'Crispina Modales') denounced the whitewashing of the institutional violence exercised by social services (represented in the series by the character portrayed by Bruna Cusí) in the series so the latter could "reach the great democratic public, that great public that endows social services with messianic powers of integration in the shitty capitalism in which we live and that deliberately conceals the true nature of social workers" and derisively renamed the series as 'Nazi'. Costa explained that instead of the case of Morales' original work of all the characters working in such institution being "evil", she was interested in something "radically opposite" since the inception of the series. In Costa's vision, "institutions are one thing and the people working in them are another [different one]", thereby justifying the deviation from the original work by Morales. Upon the harsh criticism of the series by Morales, Costa also said that she "sincerely believed" that Morales' stance was "purely aesthetic", and claimed that Morales had previously told her that she had enjoyed the series and laughed a lot with Marga even if she did not agree neither with the portrayal of Nati nor with the absence of institutional violence. Costa also told that Morales "can shove the Nazi thing [down/up/in] wherever it fits her".

== Accolades ==
Year	Award	Category	Nominee(s)	Result	Ref.
2022	28th Forqué Awards	Best Television Actress	Anna Castillo	Nominated	
2022	28th Forqué Awards	Best Television Actress	Natalia de Molina	Nominated	
2023	10th Feroz Awards	Best Comedy Series		Nominated	
2023	10th Feroz Awards	Best Supporting Actress in a TV Series	Coria Castillo	Nominated	
2023	10th Feroz Awards	Best Screenplay in a TV Series	Anna R. Costa, Cristina Pons	Nominated	
2024	25th Iris Awards	Best Actress	Anna Castillo	Nominated	
