= Alcarràs (film) =

- Catalan poster
- Directed by: Carla Simón
- Written by: Carla Simón; Arnau Vilaró
- Produced by: María Zamora; Stefan Schmitz; Tono Folguera; Sergi Moreno
- Starring: Jordi Pujol Dolcet; Anna Otin; Xènia Roset; Albert Bosch; Ainet Jounou
- Cinematography: Daniela Cajías
- Edited by: Ana Pfaff
- Music by: Andrea Koch
- Production companies: Avalon PC; Elastica Films; Vilaüt Films; Kino Produzioni; TV3
- Distributed by: Avalon DA/Elastica (Spain); I Wonder Pictures (Italy)
- Release dates: 15 February 2022 (Berlinale); 29 April 2022 (Spain); 26 May 2022 (Italy)
- Running time: 120 minutes
- Countries: Spain; Italy
- Language: Catalan
- Box office: $3.1 million

Alcarràs is a 2022 Spanish-Italian drama film directed by Carla Simón featuring a non-professional cast of actors. Shot in Catalan and adopting neorealist characteristics, the film explores the plight of a family against the backdrop of traditional peach-harvesting activities in Alcarràs, Catalonia.

The film had its world premiere at the 72nd Berlin International Film Festival on 15 February 2022, where it won the Golden Bear, becoming the first Catalan-language film to do so. It was subsequently released in Spanish theatres on 29 April 2022 by Avalon and Elastica and in Italian theatres on 26 May 2022 by I Wonder Pictures.

The film was selected as the Spanish entry for the Best International Feature Film at the 95th Academy Awards, but it was not nominated. It won four Gaudí Awards (Picture, Director, Original Screenplay, and Production Supervision) out of 14 nominations.

== Plot ==
In the Catalan town of Alcarràs, the Solé family has been cultivating peach orchards on the same land for generations. In the height of summer, during the harvesting season, follows the family’s daily life as they gather fruit and tend to the farm. But, sadly, the land they’ve farmed for decades, which was once given to them as a verbal promise by the Pinyol family during the Spanish Civil War, is now being reclaimed.

The new landowner, Mr. Pinyol, plans to uproot the orchard and install solar panels, leaving the Solés with no legal recourse and facing the end of their way of life.

At the center of the family is Quimet, the stubborn and hot-tempered patriarch, who refuses to accept the situation. He believes the land is theirs by right and is determined to harvest the fruit and resist eviction.

His wife Dolors tries to keep the family together. Their teenage children, Roger and Mariona, each cope in different ways. Roger, restless and frustrated, dreams of making a living through modern means like growing cannabis, while Mariona escapes into dance and performance, rehearsing for the village’s traditional pageant.

The younger generation, including the cousins Iris, Pau, and Pere, are largely unaware of the adult conflicts. They play among the trees, stage mock trials of a “stolen tractor”, and build forts in the fields. These activities have been interpreted as symbolizing a disappearing innocence and the emotional bond the family has with the land.

As summer draws to a close, so too does their time on the farm, Quimet’s relationship with his brother and uncle becomes strained over differing ideas on how to respond. Attempts at negotiation with Pinyol fail. Machinery eventually arrives to begin dismantling the orchard, and the family is powerless to stop it.

Quimet and his family sit down for what may be their last lunch under the trees, surrounded by the sound of chainsaws. The children dance one final time in the orchard, even as the bulldozers draw near.

== Cast ==
- Jordi Pujol Dolcet as Quimet
- Anna Otin as Dolors
- Xènia Roset as Mariona
- Albert Bosch as Roger
- Ainet Jounou as Iris
- Josep Abad as Rogelio
- Montse Oró as Nati
- Carles Cabós as Cisco
- Berta Pipó as Glòria

== Production ==
The screenplay was written by director Carla Simón and Arnau Vilaró. The film was produced by Avalon PC, Elastica Films, Vilaüt Films, Kino Produzioni, and TV3, with the participation of TVE and Movistar+ and the support of ICAA, ICEC, Creative Europe's MEDIA, Eurimages, MIBACT, and Diputació de Lleida. Shooting began on 1 June 2021 in the area of Alcarràs, province of Lleida, with the shooting window constrained to summer due to the film's setting based on peach harvest cycles. The cast is formed of non-professional actors from the province of Lleida. Shot in Catalan, the entire cast used the local Western dialect (Lleidatà) of the Catalan language. Filming wrapped after 8 weeks of shooting. María Zamora, Stefan Schmitz, Tono Folguera, and Sergi Moreno are credited as producers.

== Release ==
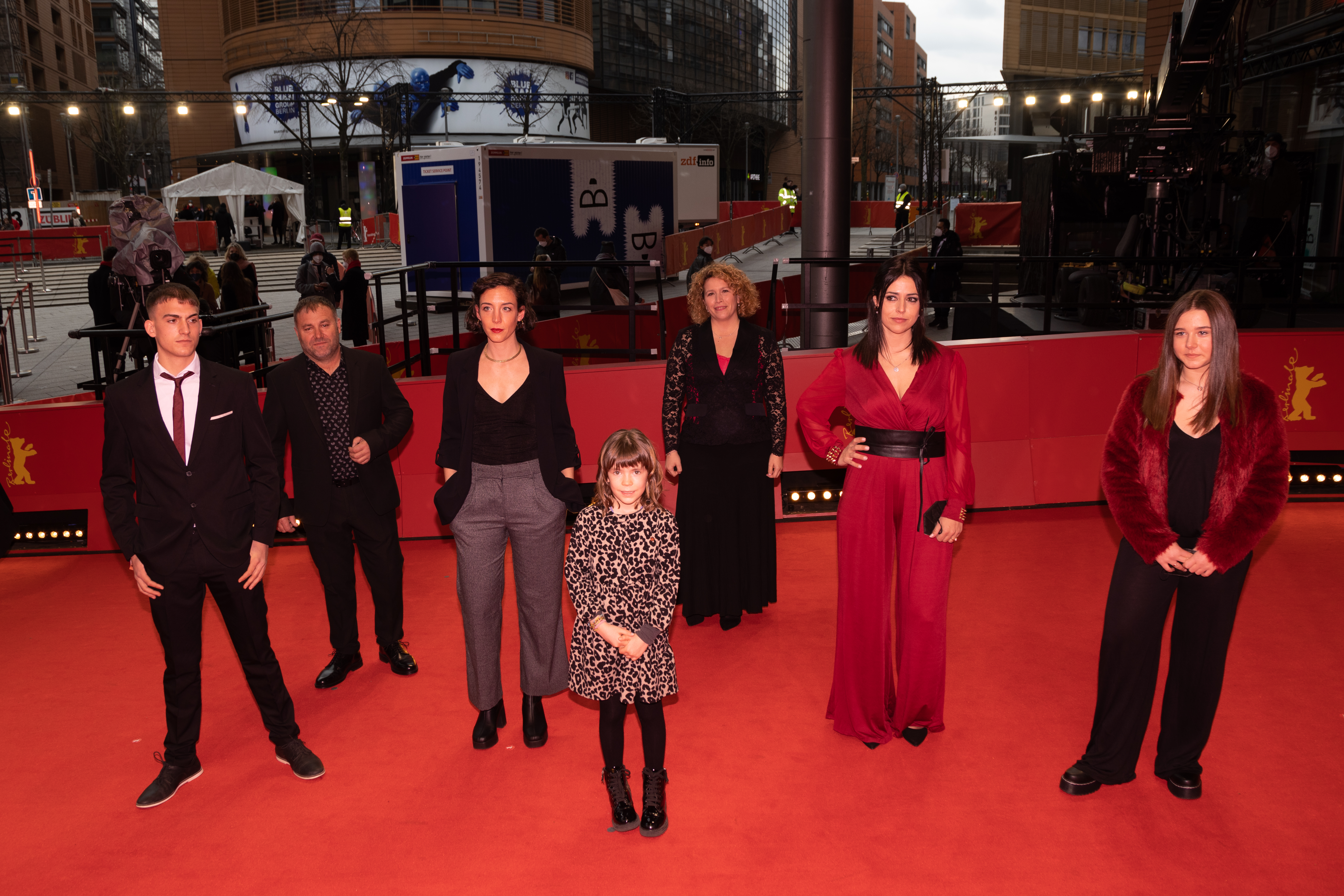
Cast members during the presentation of the film at the Berlinale

The film was screened in the official competition of the 72nd Berlinale on 15 February 2022. The film was also screened at the Málaga Festival on 19 March 2022. Initially announced to run as part of the festival's official competition, the festival and the film's producers agreed to screen the film out of competition instead.

Co-distributed by Avalon DA and Elastica Films in Spain, the film was theatrically released on 29 April 2022. Starting with a distribution to 169 theatres, the film was the most watched debut film in its opening weekend, and second film overall (first in Catalonia) after The Northman. Distributed by I Wonder Pictures, it opened in Italian theatres on 26 May 2022. The film was selected for the 60th New York Film Festival's main slate. By August 2022, the film had grossed around €2.2 million at the Spanish box office. In December of that year, it was invited to the 28th Kolkata International Film Festival and was screened there on 17 December 2022.

== Reception ==
=== Critical reception ===
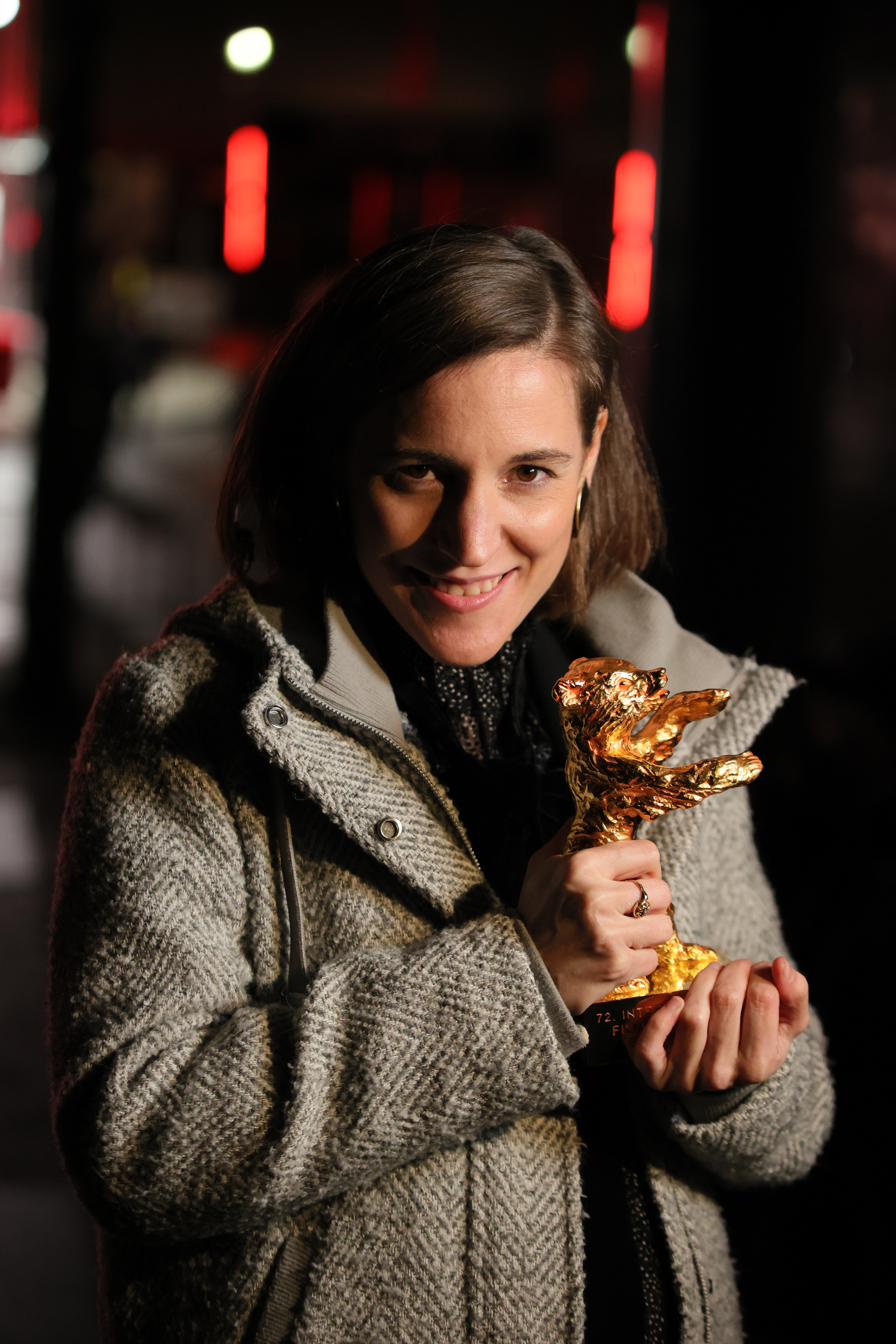
Simón holding the Golden Bear statuette.

According to the review aggregator Rotten Tomatoes, Alcarràs has a 93% approval rating based on 59 reviews from critics, with an average rating of 8.1/10. The critical consensus on the website reads: "While it may lack a narrative punch, Alcarràs captures this rural world and its heritage with a gripping sense of nostalgia for things forever gone." On Metacritic, which uses a weighted average, the film holds a score of 85 out of 100 based on 19 reviews, indicating "universal acclaim".

Reviewing the film for The Daily Telegraph, Tim Robey rated the film 5 out of 5 stars, saying that the film "manages a light, improvisatory mastery, an immaculate hold on tone, and a grave yet sunlit tableau of an ending, with each one of these faces turned in collective mourning, that I'll never forget". Fionnuala Halligan of ScreenDaily wrote that Alcarràs constitutes a "profoundly authentic and moving contemplation of the fragility of family, and, again, childhood" and has "all the hallmarks of a very specific film with emotionally wide appeal, a thoughtful essay which can also rattle and hum".

Guy Lodge of Variety wrote that Alcarràs confirmed "the strength and consistency of Simón's directorial voice" after Summer 1993, also writing that it "balances a bristling political conscience against its tenderly observed domestic drama". Writing for Little White Lies, Caitlin Quinlan said that the film "strikes a deft balance between idyllic reminiscence and melancholy for a cherished place", while also "delivering a poignant tale about the impact of industrial development on agriculture". Sergi Sánchez of Fotogramas wrote that Simón gets to "translate into images what many neorealist filmmakers pursued unceasingly," which is "truth, this time of a changing space and time, which appeals to the collective without losing the thread of the individual".

In August 2022, Alcarràs was announced as one of three films shortlisted by the Academy of Cinematographic Arts and Sciences of Spain to be the Spanish submission to the 95th Academy Awards for Best International Feature Film alongside Rodrigo Sorogoyen's The Beasts and Alauda Ruiz de Azúa's Lullaby. Alcarràs ultimately was then official submission for the category.

=== Top ten lists ===
The film appeared on a number of critics' top ten lists of the best European films of 2022:

- 1st — Cineuropa (Camillo De Marco)
- 1st — Cineuropa (Jesús Silva)
- 6th — Cineuropa (Mariana Hristova)
- 7th — Cineuropa (Júlia Olmo)
- 8th — Cineuropa (David González)
- 9th — Cineuropa (Birgit Heidsiek)

In addition, it also appeared on top ten lists of the best Spanish films of 2022:

- 1st — El Periódico de Catalunya (critics)
- 1st — El Cultural (Carlos Heredero)
- 1st — El Cultural (Begoña Donat)
- 1st — El Cultural (Juan Sardá)
- 1st — El Español ('Series&más' critics)
- 1st — El Confidencial (Marta Medina)
- 1st — Cadena SER ('El cine en la SER' critics)
- 1st — Cadena SER (Pepa Blanes)
- 1st — Cadena SER (Jose M. Romero)
- 1st — El Mundo (Luis Martínez)
- 1st — Vanity Fair (Juan Sanguino & Paloma Rando)
- 2nd — El Cultural (Javier Yuste)
- 5th — El Cultural (Manu Yáñez)
- 5th — Cadena SER (Elio Castro)
- 6th — El Cultural (Mariona Burrull)
- 10th — ABC (Oti Rodríguez Marchante)

=== Accolades ===
Award	Date of ceremony	Category	Recipient(s)	Result	Ref.
Berlin International Film Festival	20 February 2022	Golden Bear	Carla Simón	Won	
Sydney Film Festival	19 June 2022	Sydney Film Prize	Alcarràs	Nominated	
San Sebastián International Film Festival	24 September 2022	Lurra Greenpeace Award	Alcarràs	Won	
European Film Awards	10 December 2022	Best Film	Alcarràs	Nominated	
European Film Awards	10 December 2022	Best Screenwriter	Arnau Vilaró and Carla Simón	Nominated	
European Film Awards	10 December 2022	European University Film Award	Alcarràs	Nominated	
Forqué Awards	17 December 2022	Best Film	Alcarràs	Nominated	
Forqué Awards	17 December 2022	Cinema and Education in Values	Alcarràs	Nominated	
Palm Springs International Film Festival	16 January 2023	Best International Feature Film		Nominated	
Palm Springs International Film Festival	16 January 2023	Best International Screenplay	Arnau Vilaró, Carla Simón	Won	
Gaudí Awards	22 January 2023	Best Film		Won	
Gaudí Awards	22 January 2023	Best Director	Carla Simón	Won	
Gaudí Awards	22 January 2023	Best New Performance	Albert Bosch	Nominated	
Gaudí Awards	22 January 2023	Best New Performance	Xènia Roset	Nominated	
Gaudí Awards	22 January 2023	Best Supporting Actress	Berta Pipó	Nominated	
Gaudí Awards	22 January 2023	Best Supporting Actress	Montse Oró	Nominated	
Gaudí Awards	22 January 2023	Best Supporting Actor	Josep Abad	Nominated	
Gaudí Awards	22 January 2023	Best Original Screenplay	Carla Simón, Arnau Vilaró	Won	
Gaudí Awards	22 January 2023	Best Production Supervision	Elisa Sirvent	Won	
Gaudí Awards	22 January 2023	Best Editing	Ana Pfaff	Nominated	
Gaudí Awards	22 January 2023	Best Original Score	Andrea Koch	Nominated	
Gaudí Awards	22 January 2023	Best Cinematography	Daniela Cajías	Nominated	
Gaudí Awards	22 January 2023	Best Costume Design	Anna Aguilà	Nominated	
Gaudí Awards	22 January 2023	Best Sound	Eva Valiño, Thomas Giorgi, Alejandro Castillo	Nominated	
Feroz Awards	28 January 2023	Best Drama Film	Alcarràs	Nominated	
Feroz Awards	28 January 2023	Best Director	Carla Simón	Won	
Feroz Awards	28 January 2023	Best Screenplay	Carla Simón, Arnau Vilaró	Nominated	
Carmen Awards	4 February 2023	Best Non-Andalusian Film		Nominated	
CEC Medals	6 February 2023	Best Film		Nominated	
CEC Medals	6 February 2023	Best Director	Carla Simón	Nominated	
CEC Medals	6 February 2023	Best Supporting Actress	Berta Pipó	Nominated	
CEC Medals	6 February 2023	Best New Actor	Albert Bosch	Won	
CEC Medals	6 February 2023	Best New Actress	Anna Otín	Nominated	
CEC Medals	6 February 2023	Best Original Screenplay	Arnau Vilaró, Carla Simón	Nominated	
CEC Medals	6 February 2023	Best Cinematography	Daniela Cajías	Nominated	
CEC Medals	6 February 2023	Best Editing	Ana Pfaff	Nominated	
Goya Awards	11 February 2023	Best Film		Nominated	
Goya Awards	11 February 2023	Best Director	Carla Simón	Nominated	
Goya Awards	11 February 2023	Best Original Screenplay	Arnau Vilaró, Carla Simón	Nominated	
Goya Awards	11 February 2023	Best New Actress	Anna Otín	Nominated	
Goya Awards	11 February 2023	Best New Actor	Albert Bosch	Nominated	
Goya Awards	11 February 2023	Best New Actor	Jordi Pujol Doncet	Nominated	
Goya Awards	11 February 2023	Best Cinematography	Daniela Cajías	Nominated	
Goya Awards	11 February 2023	Best Editing	Ana Pfaff	Nominated	
Goya Awards	11 February 2023	Best Sound	Eva Valiño, Thomas Giorgi, Alejandro Castillo	Nominated	
Goya Awards	11 February 2023	Best Art Direction	Mónica Bernuy	Nominated	
Goya Awards	11 February 2023	Best Production Supervision	Elisa Sirvent	Nominated	
Platino Awards	22 April 2023	Best Ibero-American Film	Alcarràs	Nominated	
Platino Awards	22 April 2023	Best Director	Carla Simón	Nominated	
Platino Awards	22 April 2023	Best Cinematography	Daniela Cajías	Nominated	
Rolling Stone en Español Awards	26 October 2023	Fiction Feature Film of the Year	Alcarràs	Nominated	
Rolling Stone en Español Awards	26 October 2023	Direction of the Year	Carla Simón	Nominated	

== See also ==
- List of submissions to the 95th Academy Awards for Best International Feature Film
- List of Spanish submissions for the Academy Award for Best International Feature Film
- List of Spanish films of 2022
- List of Italian films of 2022
