= Luis Zahera =

Spanish actor (born 1966)

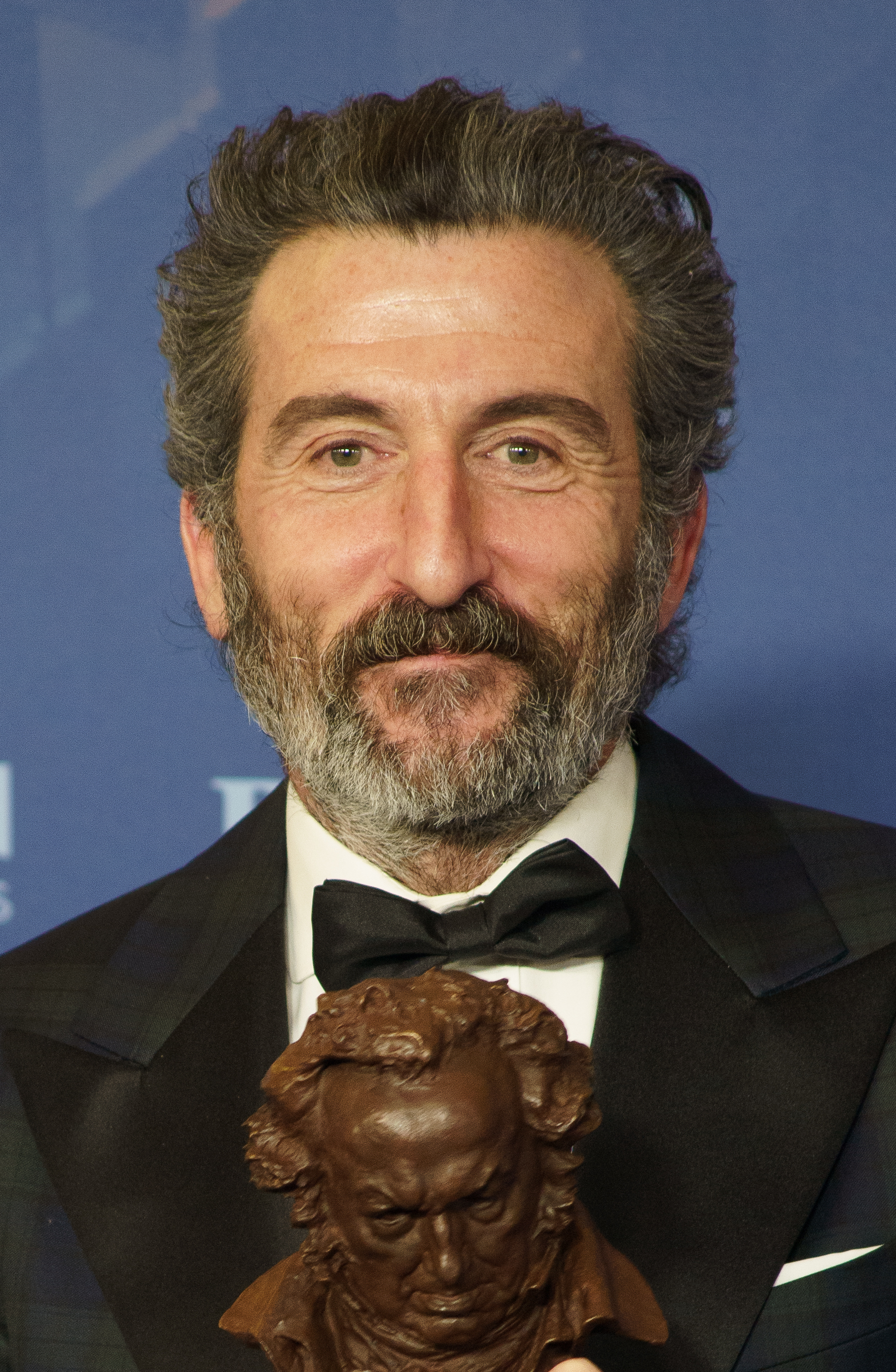
- Zahera in 2023
- Born: José Luis Castro Zahera; 23 May 1966 (age 60); Santiago de Compostela, Spain
- Occupation: Actor

José Luis Castro Zahera (born 23 May 1966) is a Spanish actor from Galicia. He is known for his performances in supporting roles in Galician and Spanish films and television series.

== Biography ==
José Luis Castro Zahera was born on 23 May 1966 in Santiago de Compostela. Zahera earned early public recognition in his native Galicia for his performance as Petróleo in the series Mareas vivas. He made his feature film debut in José Luis García Sánchez's Divine Words (1987).

He won the Goya Award for Best Supporting Actor in 2019 for his performance as Cabrera in The Realm. He won another Goya for his supporting performance in The Beasts (2022), portraying spiteful villager Xan. In January 2024, he received the Gold Medal of Merit in the Fine Arts.

== Filmography ==
=== Television ===
| Year | Title | Role | Notes | Ref. |
|---|---|---|---|---|
| 1998–2002 | Mareas vivas | Petróleo | | |
| 2008 | Sin tetas no hay paraíso | El Pertur | | |
| 2010 | La isla de los nominados | César Sarmiento | | |
| 2011 | Piratas | Puñales | | |
| 2012 | Matalobos | Aníbal | | |
| 2016 | Buscando el norte | Roberto Llamazares | | |
| 2016 | El padre de Caín | Bermejo | | |
| 2017 | La zona | Lucio | | |
| 2018 | Vivir sin permiso (Unauthorized Living) | Ferro | | |
| 2020 | La unidad | Sergio | | |
| 2020 | Enemigo íntimo | El Gallego | Season 2 | |
| 2022 | Entrevías (Wrong Side of the Tracks) | Ezequiel | | |
| 2022 | La última (Our Only Chance) | | | |
| 2025 | Animal (Old Dog, New Tricks) | Antón | | |

=== Film ===
| Year | Title | Role | Notes | Ref. |
|---|---|---|---|---|
| 2001 | Lena | Antonio | | |
| 2006 | Alatriste | Pereira | | |
| 2007 | Concursante (The Contestant) | Pizarro | | |
| 2008 | Los años desnudos. Clasificada S (Rated R) | Angel | | |
| 2009 | Celda 211 (Cell 211) | Releches | | |
| 2011 | La herencia Valdemar II: La sombra prohibida | HP Lovecraft | | |
| 2012 | Invasor (Invader) | Arturo | | |
| 2012 | Todo es silencio (All Is Silence) | Malpica | | |
| 2016 | Que Dios nos perdone (May God Save Us) | Alonso | | |
| 2018 | El reino (The Realm) | Cabrera | | |
| 2019 | Mientras dure la guerra (While at War) | Atilano Coco | | |
| 2021 | Xtremo (Xtreme) | Urquiza | | |
| 2021 | Loco por ella (Crazy About Her) | Saúl | | |
| 2022 | As bestas (The Beasts) | Xan | | |
| 2024 | El correo (The Courier) | Comisario Roig | | |
| 2024 | Pájaros (Birds Flying East) | Mario | | |
| 2024 | Amanece en Samaná (Samana Sunrise) | Mario | | |
| 2025 | Tierra de nadie (Barren Land) | Mateo el Gallego | | |
| 2026 | Zeta (Agent Zeta) | Ancares | | |
| 2026 | Colisión (Collision Course) | Ernesto | | |

== Accolades ==
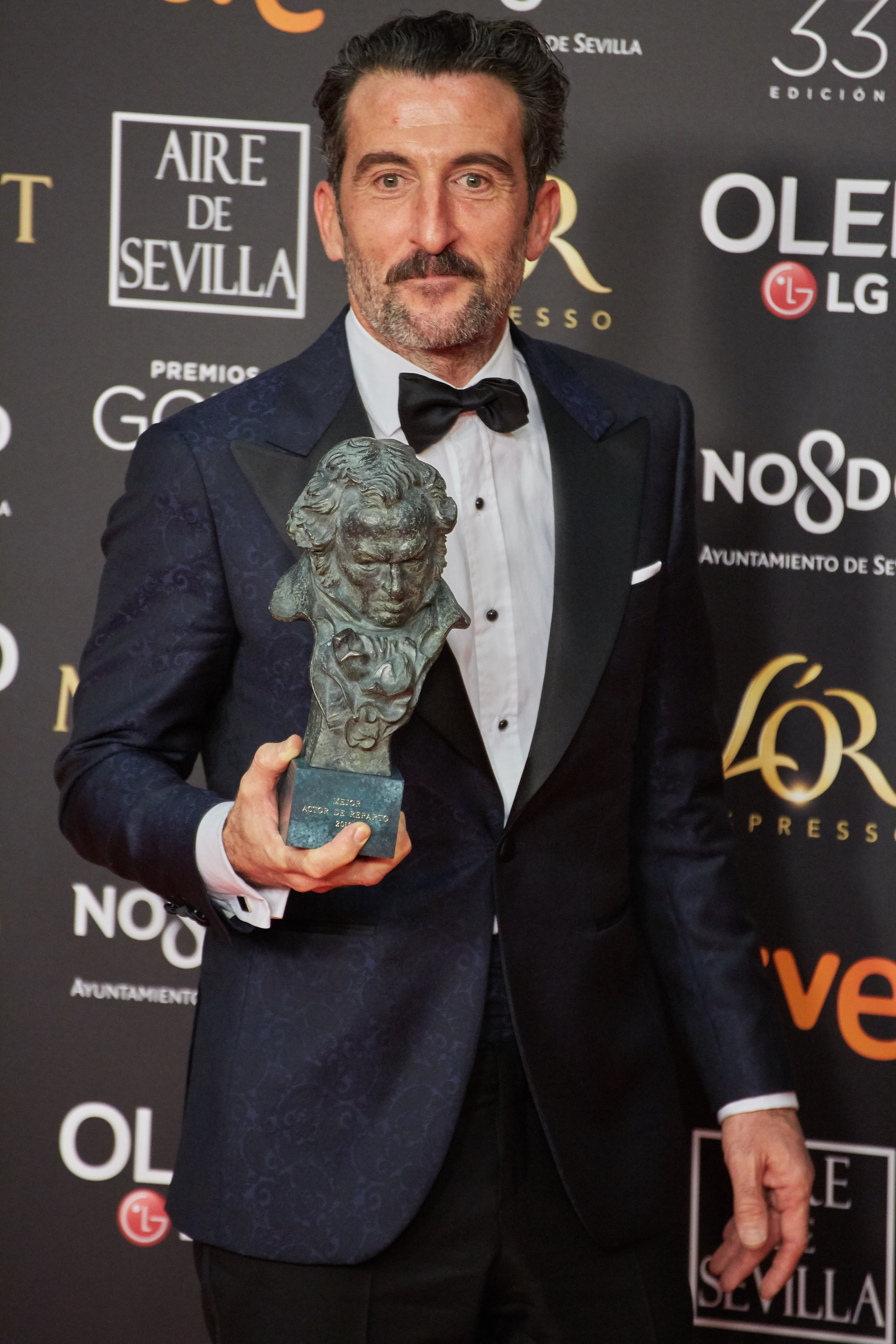
Zahera holding his Goya Award for Best Supporting actor for his performance in The Realm in 2019.

| Year | Award | Category | Work | Result | Ref. |
|---|---|---|---|---|---|
| 2008 | 6th Mestre Mateo Awards | Best Supporting Actor | The Contestant | Won | |
| 2010 | 19th Actors and Actresses Union Awards | Best Film Actor in a Minor Role | Cell 211 | Nominated | |
| 2010 | 8th Mestre Mateo Awards | Best Supporting Actor | Cell 211 | Won | |
| 2013 | 11th Mestre Mateo Awards | Best Supporting Actor | All Is Silence | Won | |
| 2019 | 6th Feroz Awards | Best Supporting Actor (film) | The Realm | Won | |
| 2019 | 74th CEC Medals | Best Supporting Actor | The Realm | Won | |
| 2019 | 33rd Goya Awards | Best Supporting Actor | The Realm | Won | |
| 2019 | 28th Actors and Actresses Union Awards | Best Film Actor in a Secondary Role | The Realm | Nominated | |
| 2022 | 28th Forqué Awards | Best TV Actor | Wrong Side of the Tracks | Nominated | |
| 2023 | 10th Feroz Awards | Best Supporting Actor in a TV Series | The Unit | Nominated | |
| 2023 | 10th Feroz Awards | Best Supporting Actor in a Film | The Beasts | Won | |
| 2023 | 37th Goya Awards | Best Supporting Actor | The Beasts | Won | |
| 2023 | 31st Actors and Actresses Union Awards | Best Film Actor in a Secondary Role | The Beasts | Won | |
| 2023 | 10th Platino Awards | Best Supporting Actor | The Beasts | Won | |
| 2024 | 27th Málaga Film Festival | Silver Biznaga for Best Actor | Birds Flying East | Won | |
| 2025 | 31st Forqué Awards | Best Actor in a Series | Old Dog, New Tricks | Nominated | |
| 2026 | 13th Feroz Awards | Best Main Actor in a Series | Old Dog, New Tricks | Nominated | |
