= Isa Campo =

Spanish screenwriter

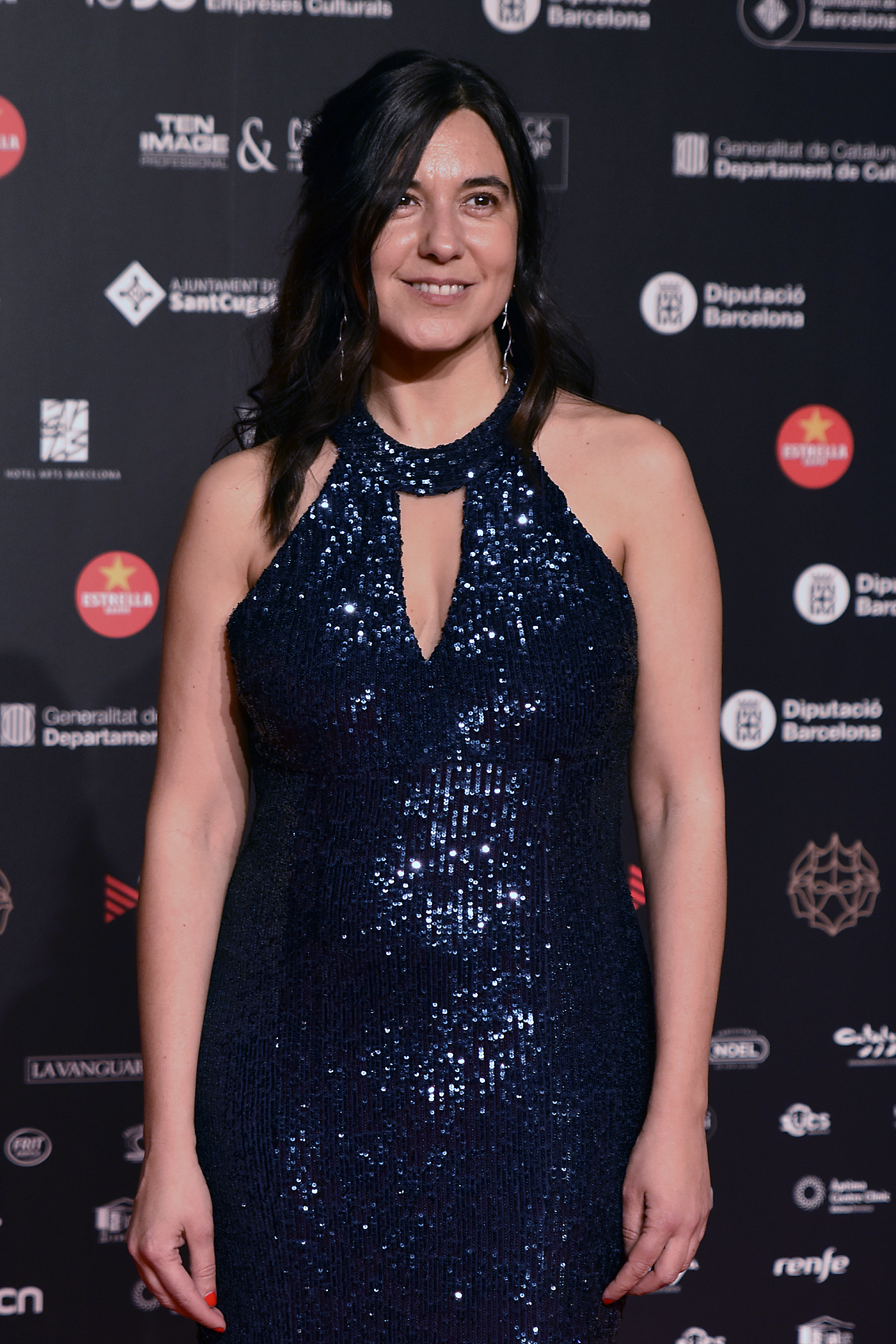
- Attending the 14th Gaudí Awards
- Born: 1975 (age 50–51); Oviedo, Spain
- Occupations: Screenwriter; producer; director
- Partner: Isaki Lacuesta

Isa Campo (born 1975) is a Spanish screenwriter who has also directed and produced. She is a longtime collaborator of Isaki Lacuesta.

== Biography ==
Campo was born in Oviedo in 1975. She moved to Girona, Catalonia at a young age, in the wake of her family's work obligations. At age 14, she met Iñaki Lacuesta (aka Isaki Lacuesta), her longtime artistic collaborator and domestic partner. She is an industrial engineer and philosopher by training. She has worked as a lecturer on film direction for the Pompeu Fabra University.

== Filmography ==
Year	Title		Director	Writer	Notes	Ref.
2009	Los condenados (The Damned)		No	Yes		
2010	La noche que no acaba (All Night Long)		No	Yes		
2011	Los pasos dobles (The Double Steps)		No	Yes		
2011	El cuaderno de barro (The Clay Diaries)		No	Yes		
2015	Game Over		No	Yes		
2016	La propera pell (The Next Skin)		Yes	Yes	Co-directed along with Isaki Lacuesta	
2018	Entre dos aguas (Between Two Waters)		No	Yes		
2021	Maixabel		No	Yes		
2022	Un año, una noche (One Year, One Night)		No	Yes		
2022	Cantando en las azoteas		No	Yes		
2022	Black Is Beltza II: Ainhoa		No	Yes		
2022	Apagón (Offworld)	"Confrontación"	Yes	Yes		
2022	Apagón (Offworld)	"Equilibrio"	No	Yes		
2023	Sobre todo de noche (Foremost by Night)		No	Yes	Also producer	

== Accolades ==
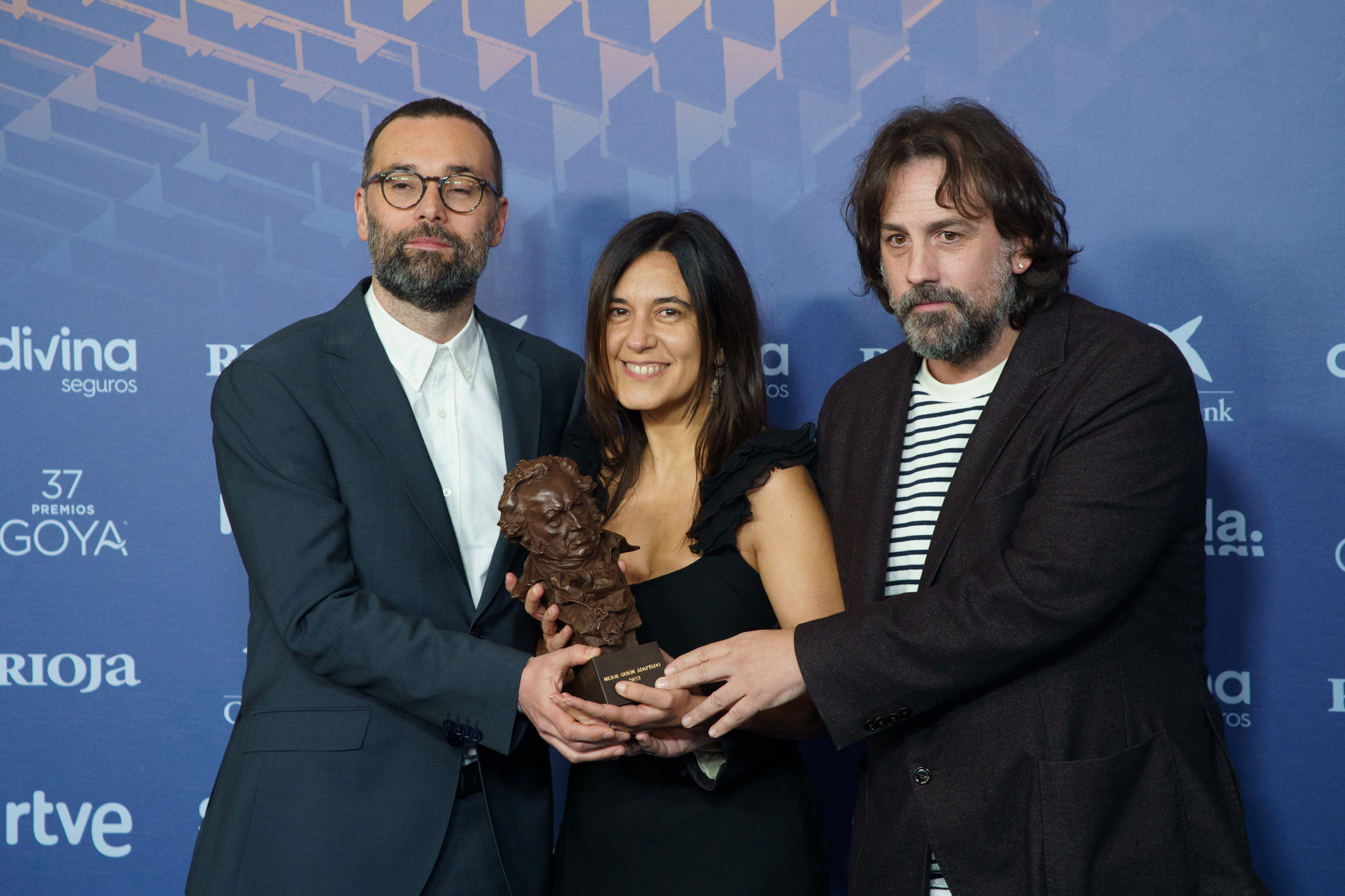
Fran Araújo, Isa Campo, and Isaki Lacuesta holding their Goya Award for Best Adapted Screenplay for One Year, One Night.

Year	Award	Category	Nominated work	Result	Ref.
2017	9th Gaudí Awards	Best Director	The Next Skin	Nominated	
2017	9th Gaudí Awards	Best Screenplay	The Next Skin	Won	
2022	9th Feroz Awards	Best Screenplay	Maixabel	Nominated	
2022	36th Goya Awards	Best Original Screenplay	Maixabel	Nominated	
2023	15th Gaudí Awards	Best Adapted Screenplay	One Year, One Night	Won	
2023	10th Feroz Awards	Best Screenplay in a Film	One Year, One Night	Won	
2023	10th Feroz Awards	Best Screenplay in a TV Series	Offworld	Nominated	
2023	37th Goya Awards	Best Adapted Screenplay	One Year, One Night	Won	
