= Carla Simón =

Catalan film director

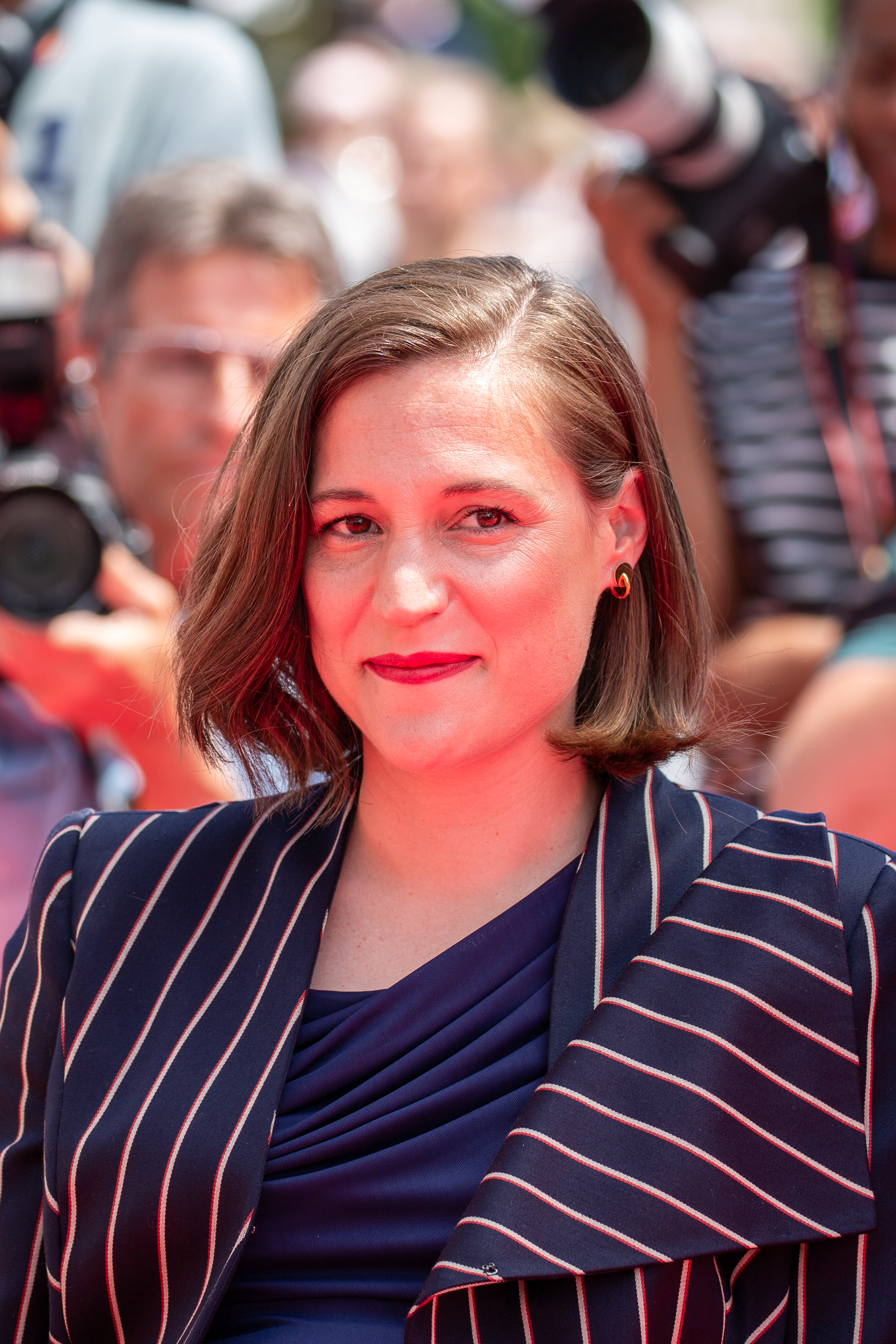
- Simón at the 2025 Cannes Film Festival
- Born: Carla Simón Pipó; 29 December 1986 (age 39); Barcelona, Catalonia, Spain
- Occupations: Director; screenwriter
- Years active: 2009–present
- Children: 2

Carla Simón Pipó (born 29 December 1986) is a Spanish filmmaker. She is best known for her films Summer 1993 (2017) and Alcarràs (2022); for the latter she received the Golden Bear at the 72nd Berlin International Film Festival.

== Early life and education ==
Carla Simón Pipó was born on 29 December 1986 in Barcelona and spent her youth in the Catalan village of Les Planes d'Hostoles. By the age of six, her parents had died of AIDS, so she had to live with her uncle and his family in Garrotxa in northern Catalonia. Her father was Galician.

She first studied filmmaking at the University of California, Santa Barbara, United States, where she made two short films: Women (2009) and Lovers (2010).

In 2009, Simón graduated with a degree in audiovisual communication at the Universitat Autònoma de Barcelona. In 2010, she studied television work at Televisió de Catalunya and later at the London Film School. During her time in London she directed the documentary film Born Positive and the short film Lipstick.

== Career ==
Simón's first feature film, Summer 1993 (2017), is based on her own experiences in her youth. The plot revolves around a young girl and her reaction to and ways of handling her parents' sudden death. Filming took place over six weeks in rural Garrotxa, where Simón grew up.

The film had its world premiere at the Generation section of the 67th Berlin International Film Festival, where it won the award for Debut Film. It also won 30 awards in numerous festivals and ceremonies, amongst them the Golden Biznaga for Best Film at the Málaga Film Festival, and the Goya Award for Best New Director. It was also chosen as Spain's submission for Best Foreign Film at the 90th Academy Awards, the second Catalan-language film to be submitted to the Academy Awards by the Spanish Film Academy.

Simón's second feature, Alcarràs (2022), won the Golden Bear at the 72nd Berlinale, becoming the first Catalan-language film to do so. The film follows the disappearance of family-based agricultural activities, in the traditional peach-harvesting fields of Catalonia. The film was also selected as the Spanish entry for the Best International Feature Film at the 95th Academy Awards, but it was not nominated.

Simón's third film, Romería (2025), was selected for the main competition of the 2025 Cannes Film Festival, where it was nominated for the Palme d'Or, marking her first film at the festival's main competition. A semi-autobiographical film, the plot follows a young orphaned woman travelling to Vigo seeking the truth about her biological father's past, an AIDS victim in the early 1990s.

In 2026, Simón was announced as jury president for the shorts films competition of the 2026 Cannes Film Festival.

== Personal life ==
Simón has a son, Manel, born in June 2022. When she presented her short film Carta a mi madre para mi hijo, she breastfed her baby, then barely two months old, in front of the press at the 79th Venice International Film Festival, to show that it is possible to reconcile motherhood with a professional career. In 2025, she walked the red carpet at the 78th Cannes Film Festival while pregnant with her second son.

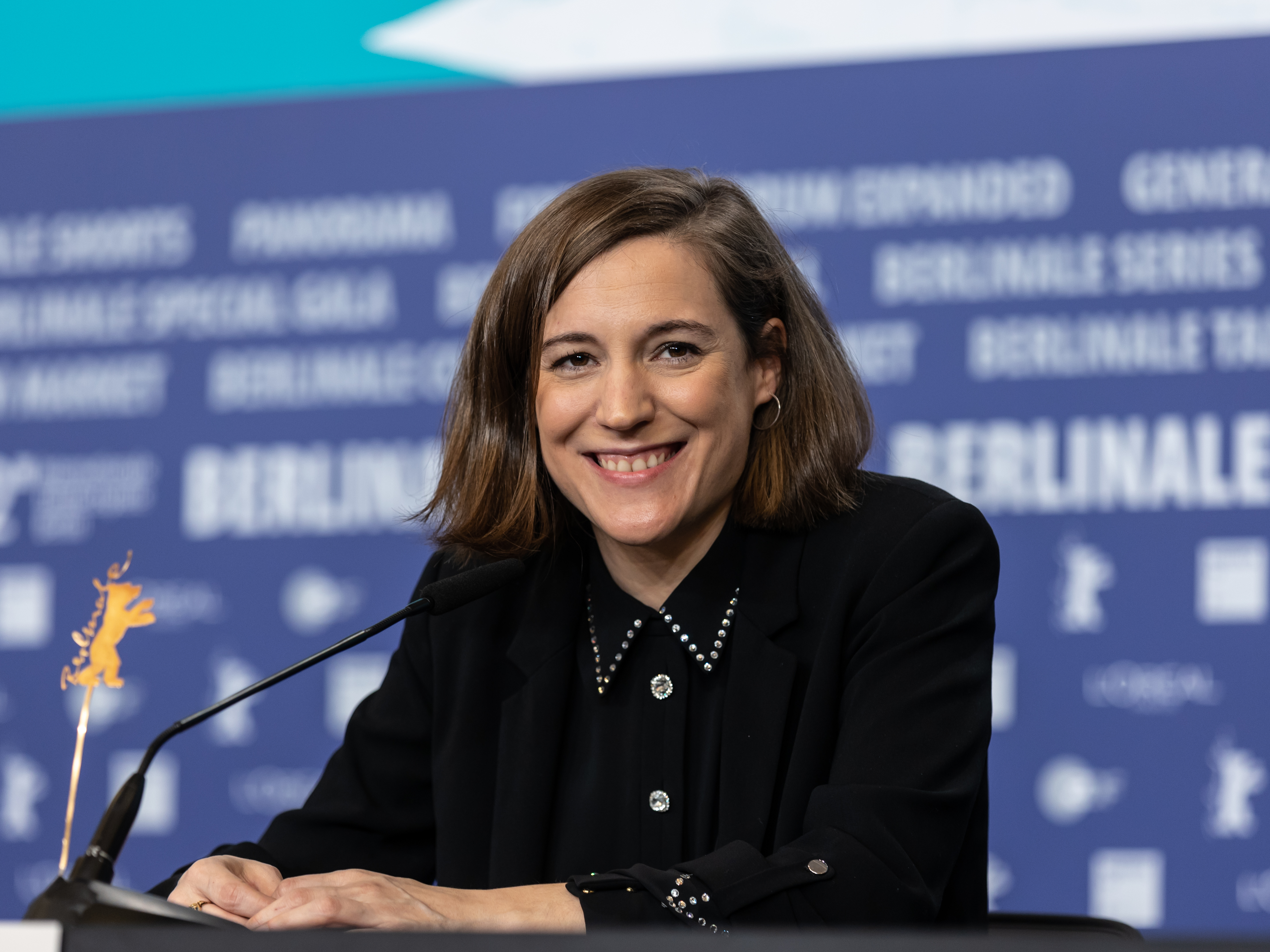
Simón during the 72nd Berlin International Film Festival

== Filmography ==
=== Feature films ===
Year	Title	Director	Writer	Producer	Notes
2017	Summer 1993	Yes	Yes	No	
2022	Alcarràs	Yes	Yes	Yes	Co-scripted with Arnau Vilaró
2025	Romería	Yes	Yes	No	

=== Short films ===
Year	Title	Director	Writer	Producer	Notes
2009	Women	Yes	Yes	Yes	Co-directed with Marco Businaro
2009	Lovers	Yes	Yes	Yes	
2012	Born Positive	Yes	Yes	No	Documentary film
2013	Lipstick	Yes	Yes	No	
2014	Las pequeñas cosas	Yes	Yes	No	
2015	Llacunes	Yes	Yes	No	
2018	Después también	Yes	Yes	No	Co-scripted with Aina Clotet and Valentina Viso
2020	Correspondencia	Yes	Yes	Yes	Co-directed with Dominga Sotomayor
2022	Carta a mi madre para mi hijo	Yes	Yes	No	Miu Miu Women's Tales #24

== Awards and nominations ==
Year	Award	Nominated work	Category	Result	Ref(s)
2022	Berlin International Film Festival	Alcarràs	Golden Bear	Won	
2022	European Film Awards	Alcarràs	Best Screenwriter	Nominated	
2023	Gaudí Awards	Alcarràs	Best Director	Won	
2023	Gaudí Awards	Alcarràs	Best Original Screenplay	Won	
2023	Feroz Awards	Alcarràs	Best Director	Won	
2023	Feroz Awards	Alcarràs	Best Screenplay	Nominated	
2023	CEC Medals	Alcarràs	Best Director	Nominated	
2023	CEC Medals	Alcarràs	Best Original Screenplay	Nominated	
2023	Goya Awards	Alcarràs	Best Director	Nominated	
2023	Goya Awards	Alcarràs	Best Original Screenplay	Nominated	
2017	Berlin International Film Festival	Summer 1993	Grand Prix of the Generation Kplus International Jury	Won	
2017	Berlin International Film Festival	Summer 1993	Best First Film	Won	
