= Alberto Rodríguez Librero =

Spanish film director and screenwriter (born 1971)

Alberto Rodríguez
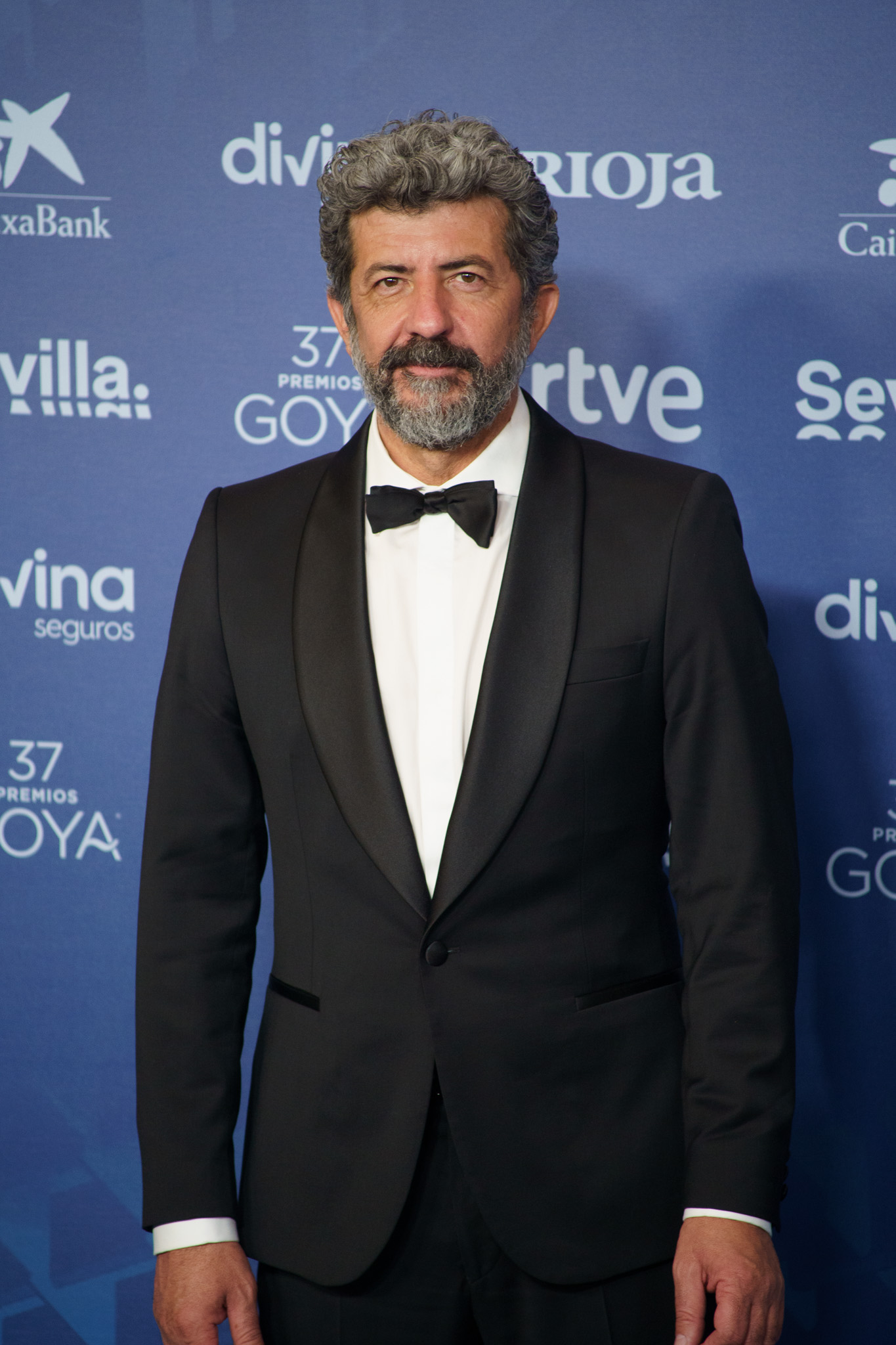
- Alberto Rodríguez in 2023
- Born: Alberto Rodríguez Librero; 11 May 1971 (age 55); Seville, Spain
- Occupations: Film director; screenwriter
- Years active: 2000–present

Alberto Rodríguez Librero (born 11 May 1971) is a Spanish film director and screenwriter from Andalusia.

== Filmography ==
=== Feature Film ===
Year	Title	Director	Writer	Notes	Ref.
2000	El factor Pilgrim	Yes	Yes	Co-directed and co-written with Santi Amodeo	
2002	El traje	Yes	Yes	Co-written with Santi Amodeo	
2005	7 Virgins	Yes	Yes	Co-written with Rafael Cobos	
2009	After	Yes	Story	Co-story writer with Rafael Cobos	
2012	Unit 7	Yes	Story	Co-story writer with Rafael Cobos	
2014	Marshland	Yes	Yes	Co-written with Rafael Cobos	
2016	Smoke & Mirrors	Yes	Yes	Co-written with Rafael Cobos	
2022	Prison 77	Yes	Yes	Co-written with Rafael Cobos	
2025	Los Tigres	Yes	Yes	Co-written with Rafael Cobos	

=== Short film ===
Year	Title	Director	Writer	Notes
1998	Prólogo a una historia de carreteras	Yes	Yes	Co-directed and co-written with Santi Amodeo
2000	Bancos	Yes	No	Co-directed with Santi Amodeo
2016	Las Pequeñas Cosas	Yes	Yes	Content-branded short film co-written with Oriol Villar
2021	El Arrepentido	Yes	Yes	Content-branded short film
2023	Voll-Damm: Los 5 pasos	Yes	No	Content-branded short film sequel to “El Arrepentido”

=== Television ===
Year	Title	Director	Writer	Notes
2010	Hispania, la leyenda	Yes	No	TV Series. Directed 4 episodes
2018-2019	La peste	Yes	Story	TV series. Co-creator and co-story writer with Rafael Cobos and directed 6 episodes
2022	Offworld	Yes	No	TV Anthology series. Directed episode: "Superviviencia"
2025	The Anatomy of a Moment	Yes	Yes	TV Mini-series. Co-wrote with Rafael Cobos and Fran Araujo and directed 3 episodes. Also executive producer

== Bibliography ==
- El cine de Alberto Rodríguez. Conversaciones, de Manuel Lamarca, Ediciones Carena, Barcelona, 2020, ISBN 978-8417852870.

== Awards and nominations ==
Year	Work	Award	Category	Result	Ref.
2006	7 Virgins	Goya Awards	Best Director	Nominated	
2006	7 Virgins	Goya Awards	Best Original Screenplay	Nominated	
2010	After	Goya Awards	Best Original Screenplay	Nominated	
2013	Unit 7	CEC Medals	Best Director	Nominated	
2013	Unit 7	CEC Medals	Best Original Screenplay	Nominated	
2013	Unit 7	Goya Awards	Best Director	Nominated	
2013	Unit 7	Goya Awards	Best Original Screenplay	Nominated	
2014	Marshland	San Sebastián International Film Festival	Golden Shell for Best Film	Nominated	
2015	Marshland	Feroz Awards	Best Director	Won	
2015	Marshland	Feroz Awards	Best Screenplay	Nominated	
2015	Marshland	Goya Awards	Best Director	Won	
2015	Marshland	Goya Awards	Best Original Screenplay	Won	
2015	Marshland	CEC Medals	Best Director	Won	
2015	Marshland	CEC Medals	Best Original Screenplay	Won	
2015	Marshland	European Film Awards	European Film Academy People's Choice Award for Best European Film	Won	
2015	Marshland	Ariel Awards	Best Ibero-American Film	Nominated	
2016	Smoke & Mirrors	San Sebastián International Film Festival	Golden Shell for Best Film	Nominated	
2017	Smoke & Mirrors	Feroz Awards	Best Director	Nominated	
2017	Smoke & Mirrors	Feroz Awards	Best Screenplay	Nominated	
2017	Smoke & Mirrors	CEC Medals	Best Director	Won	
2017	Smoke & Mirrors	CEC Medals	Best Adapted Screenplay	Won	
2017	Smoke & Mirrors	Goya Awards	Best Director	Nominated	
2017	Smoke & Mirrors	Goya Awards	Best Adapted Screenplay	Won	
2023	Prison 77	Carmen Awards	Best Director	Won	
2023	Prison 77	Carmen Awards	Best Original Screenplay	Won	
2023	Prison 77	CEC Medals	Best Original Screenplay	Nominated	
2023	Prison 77	Goya Awards	Best Director	Nominated	
2023	Prison 77	Goya Awards	Best Original Screenplay	Nominated	
