= Miguel Herrán =

Spanish actor

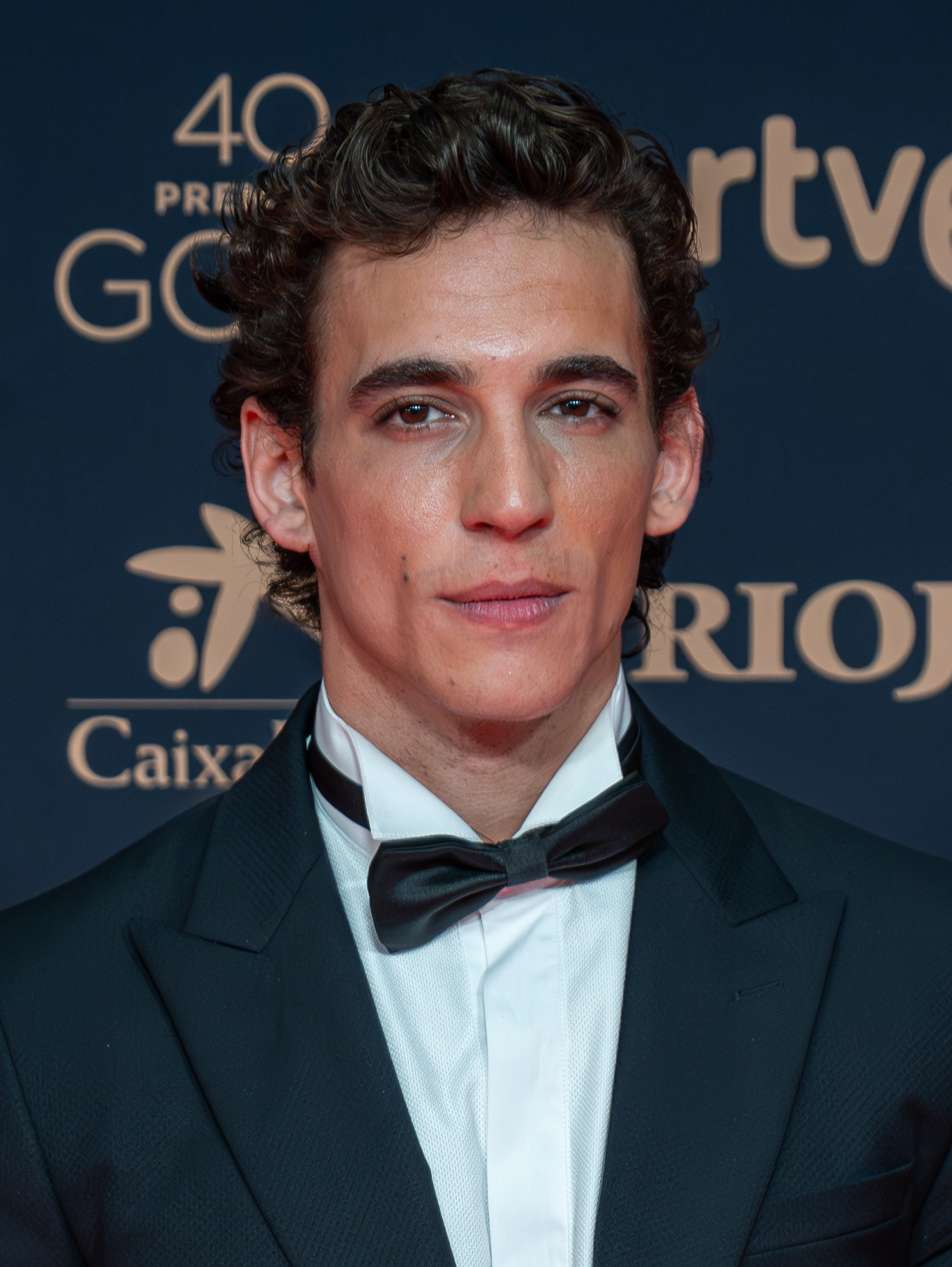
- Herrán in 2026
- Born: Miguel Ángel García de la Herrán; 25 April 1996 (age 30); Málaga, Spain
- Occupation: Actor
- Years active: 2015–present
- Children: 1

Miguel Ángel García de la Herrán (born 25 April 1996), best known as Miguel Herrán, is a Spanish actor. In 2016, he won the Goya Award for Best New Actor for his feature film debut in Nothing in Return. He gained fame for his performances in television series Élite and Money Heist.

== Life and career ==
Herrán was born in Málaga on 25 April 1996 and raised in Chamberí, Madrid. He was not interested in studying and failed four years of his elementary and secondary education. A chance encounter with actor and director Daniel Guzmán in the streets of Madrid led to Herrán auditioning for the role of Darío in the film Nothing in Return (2015), which would earn him the Goya Award for Best New Actor.

In 2017, he was cast as Aníbal Cortés (codename 'Río') in the Antena 3 series Money Heist, which was later picked up by Netflix. In 2018, he starred as Christian Varela in the Netflix original series Élite.

Herrán also acted in an advertisement for the Indian music streaming platform Gaana.

== Filmography ==
Key
†	Denotes films that have not yet been released

=== Films ===
Year	Title	Character	Notes	Ref.
2015	A cambio de nada (Nothing in Return)	Darío		
2016	1898, Los últimos de Filipinas (1898, Our Last Men in the Philippines)	Soldado Carvajal		
2017	El guardián invisible (The Invisible Guardian)	Miguel Ángel		
2018	Alegría tristeza (Happy Sad)	Borja		
2018	Tiempo después (Some Time Later)	Ray		
2020	Hasta el cielo (Sky High)	Ángel		
2022	Modelo 77 (Prison 77)	Manuel		
2024	Valle de sombras (Valley of Shadows)	Quique		
2025	La tregua (The Truce)	Salgado		
TBA	El potro de Vallecas †	Poli Díaz, "el potro de Vallecas"		

=== Television ===
Year	Title	Character	Channel	Notes	Ref.
2017–21	Money Heist	Aníbal Cortés / Rio	Antena 3/Netflix	41 episodes	
2018–19	Elite	Christian Varela Expósito	Netflix	9 episodes	
2023	Los Farad	Oskar			
2024	Asalto al Banco Central (Bank Under Siege)	José Juan Martínez Gómez, "El Rubio", "Número 1"			

== Accolades ==
Year	Award	Category	Work	Result	Ref.
2016	30th Goya Awards	Best New Actor	Nothing in Return	Won	
2016	Premios CEC	Best New Actor	Nothing in Return	Nominated	
2022	28th Forqué Awards	Best Film Actor	Prison 77	Nominated	
2023	10th Feroz Awards	Best Actor in a Film	Prison 77	Nominated	
2023	2nd Carmen Awards	Best Actor	Prison 77	Won	
2023	37th Goya Awards	Best Actor	Prison 77	Nominated	
2025	26th Iris Awards	Best Actor	Los Farad	Nominated	
