= Isaki Lacuesta =

Spanish film director from Catalonia (born 1975)

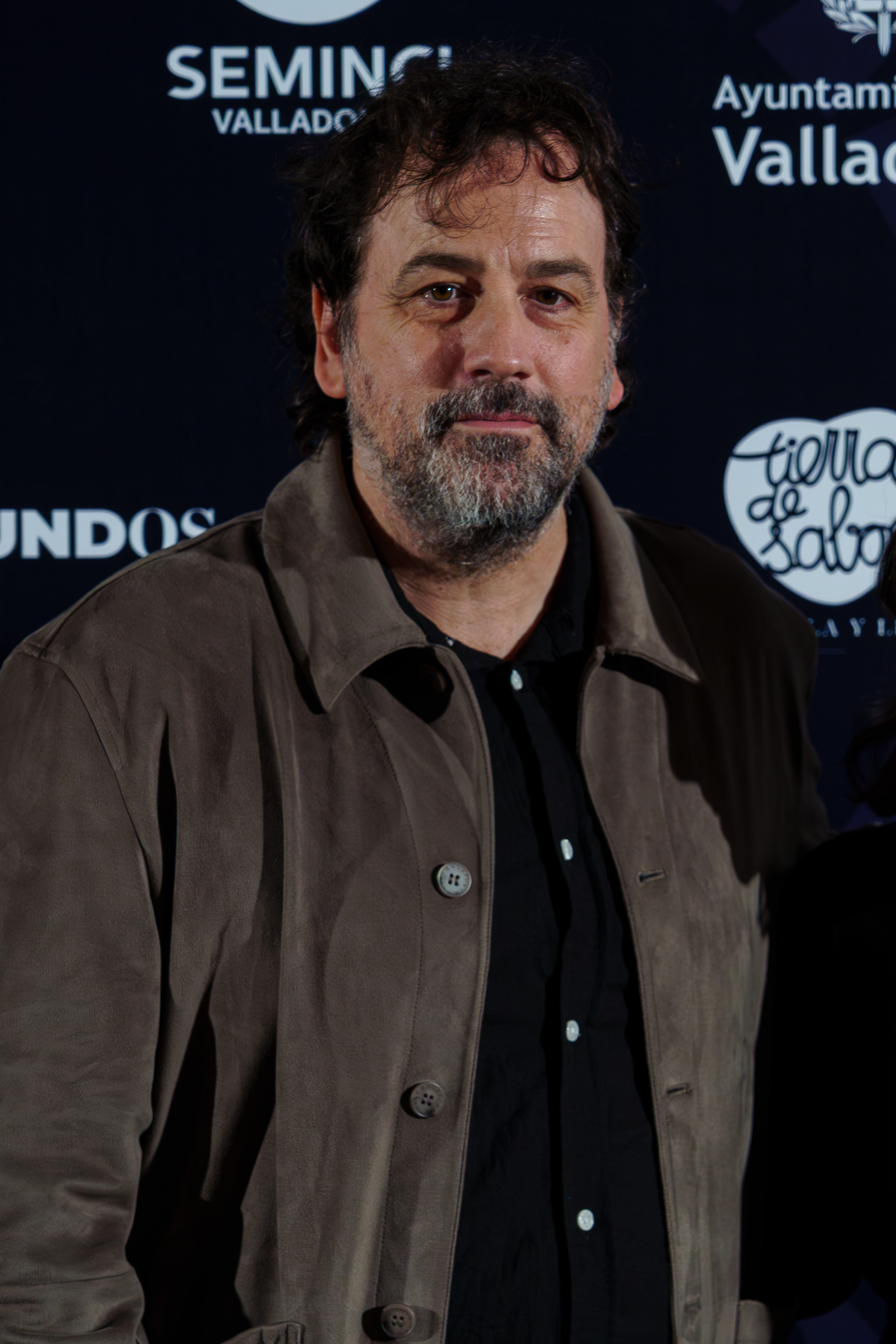
- Lacuesta in 2025
- Born: 28 November 1975 (age 50); Girona, Spain
- Education: Autonomous University of Barcelona
- Occupations: Film director; lecturer
- Employer: Pompeu Fabra University
- Partner: Isa Campo

Isaki Lacuesta (born 28 November 1975) is a Spanish film director from Catalonia. His work includes documentary film, narrative film and video art.

Lacuesta was born into a family of Basque origin. He studied audiovisual communication at the Autonomous University of Barcelona and obtained his master's degree in documentary film making at Pompeu Fabra University in Barcelona, where he now works as a lecturer in documentary film making. He also teaches at the Autonomous University of Barcelona, Pompeu Fabra University, the Centre d'estudis cinematogràfics de Catalunya, and the University of Girona.

He is a longtime collaborator and domestic partner of Isa Campo, after whom he rebranded his first name as Isaki (he is actually named Iñaki).

== Prizes and awards ==
- 2011: Golden Shell for Best Film at the San Sebastián International Film Festival for Los pasos dobles
- 2011: Caracola a la trayectoria at the Alcances Festival in Cádiz
- 2011: Eloy de la Iglesia Award at the Málaga Film Festival
- 2011: Pantalla Hall Award for young film makers at the Ibn Arabi Festival in Murcia
- 2009: Spanish FIPRESCI Prize at the Donostia-San Sebastián Festival
- 2006: Spain film prize from the city of Donostia-San Sebastián

== Filmography (selection) ==
Feature films

- 2025: Flores para Antonio
- 2024: Segundo premio (Saturn Return)
- 2022: Un año, una noche (One Year, One Night)
- 2018: Entre dos aguas
- 2016: La propera pell (Next Skin)
- 2014: Murieron por encima de sus posibilidades (Dying Beyond Their Means)
- 2011: Los pasos dobles
- 2011: El cuaderno de barro
- 2010: La noche que no acaba
- 2009: Los condenados (The Damned)
- 2006: La leyenda del tiempo
- 2002: Cravan vs. Cravan

Short films

- 2009: In between days
- 2004: Teoria dels cossos
- 2000: Caras vs Caras

Video installations

- 2010: Mullada llum!
- 2008 Los cuerpos traslúcidos
- 2007: Traços/traces
