= Luna Pamies =

Spanish actress (born 2003)

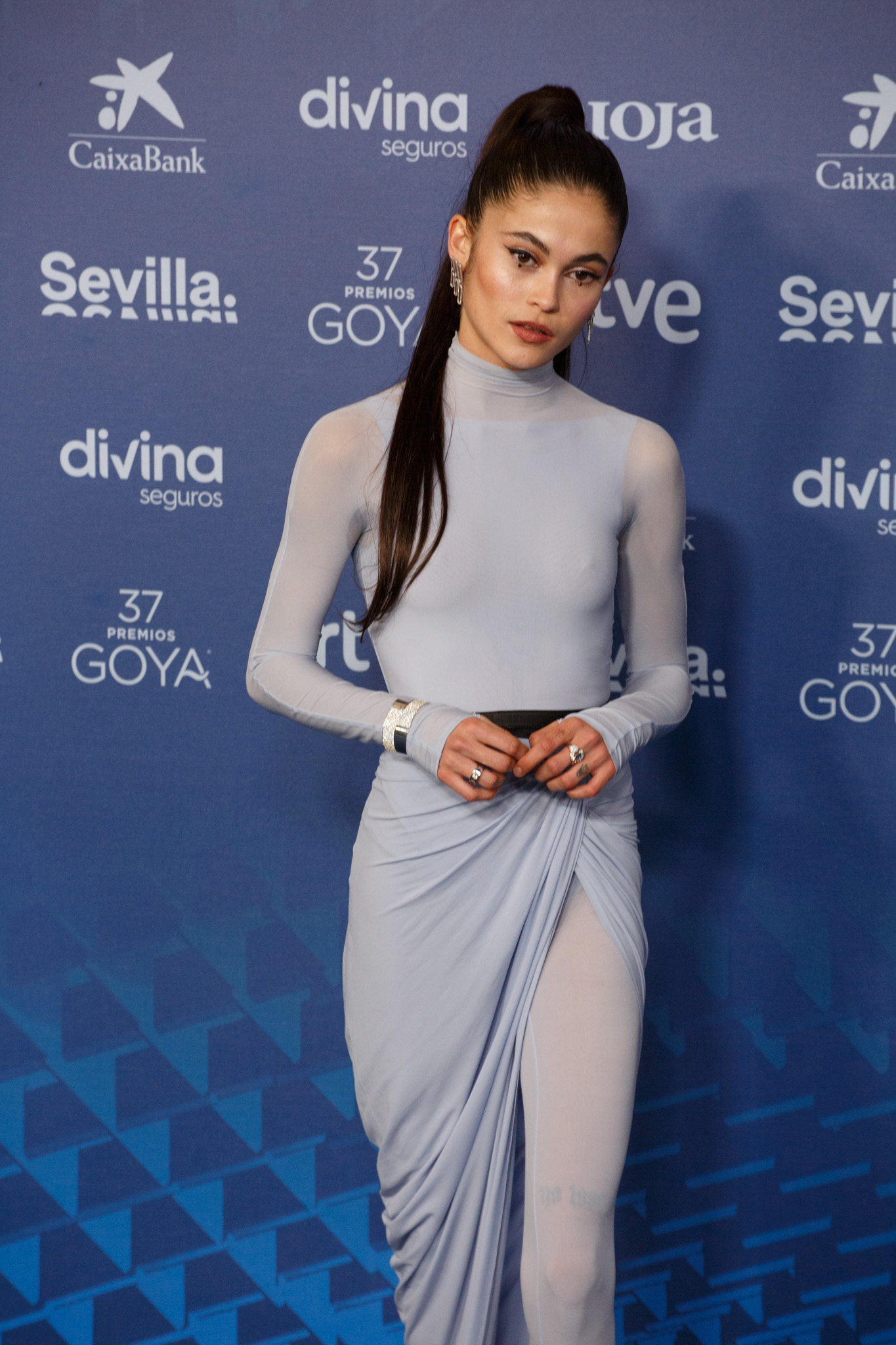
- Luna Pamies at the 2023 Goya Awards
- Born: Luna Pamies Barberá; December 24, 2003 (age 22); San Bartolomé, Orihuela, Spain
- Occupation: Actress
- Years active: 2022–present

Luna Pamies Barberá (born 24 December 2003) is a Spanish actress. She made her film debut in the leading role of El agua (2022), directed by Elena López Riera, which premiered at the Directors' Fortnight of the 2022 Cannes Film Festival. Her performance earned her a nomination for the Goya Award for Best New Actress at the 37th Goya Awards in 2023.

== Early life ==
Pamies was born on 24 December 2003 in San Bartolomé, a small pedanía (hamlet) of Orihuela in the Vega Baja del Segura region of the Province of Alicante, Spain. She grew up alongside her mother and two sisters. She had never considered a career in the performing arts before being discovered for the film El agua.

== Career ==
=== Discovery and El agua (2022) ===
In 2019, filmmaker Elena López Riera began searching for non-professional actors for her debut feature film El agua, set in her native Orihuela. López Riera spotted Pamies at a botellón during the village fiestas in San Bartolomé, when she was 15 years old and still attending secondary school with no experience in acting. She was selected from among more than 3,000 candidates for the role of Ana, the film's protagonist, and after approximately one year of rehearsals and dramaturgical training, began filming at the age of 17. In the film, she acted alongside established professionals Bárbara Lennie and Nieve de Medina.

El agua had its world premiere on 20 May 2022 at the Directors' Fortnight of the 75th Cannes Film Festival. The film subsequently screened at numerous international festivals, including the Toronto International Film Festival (Contemporary World Cinema), the San Sebastián International Film Festival (Zabaltegi-Tabakalera), and the Tokyo International Film Festival, among others.

=== Awards and recognition ===
On 12 November 2022, Pamies won the Premio Berlanga for Best Lead Actress at the fifth edition of the Premios Berlanga, the Valencian Community's film awards. El agua received six nominations at the ceremony and won two awards, with Pascual Valero also winning Best Supporting Actor.

At the 37th Goya Awards, held on 11 February 2023 in Seville, Pamies was nominated for the Goya Award for Best New Actress.

=== Enemigos (2025) ===
Following her debut, Pamies began formal acting training. She has spoken openly about the difficulties of pursuing an acting career from a small rural village without financial independence, including experiencing impostor syndrome during the audition process. In her second feature film, Enemigos (2025), she plays Lola, the sister of the protagonist Chimo (Christian Checa), in a drama about bullying, revenge, and forgiveness. The film, directed by David Valero and produced by Amazon MGM Studios and Atípica Films, premiered at the 28th Málaga Film Festival in March 2025 and was released theatrically in Spain on 9 May 2025. It was later made available worldwide on Amazon Prime Video on 29 August 2025.

== Public image ==
Due to her physical resemblance to American actress Zendaya, Pamies has been nicknamed "la Zendaya española" (the Spanish Zendaya) in the Spanish media.

== Filmography ==
Year	Title	Role	Director	Notes
2022	El agua	Ana	Elena López Riera	Film debut; lead role
2025	Enemigos	Lola	David Valero	

== Awards and nominations ==
Year	Award	Category	Work	Result	Ref.
2022	5th Berlanga Awards	Best Lead Actress	El agua	Won	
2023	37th Goya Awards	Best New Actress	El agua	Nominated	
