= 37th Goya Awards =

Spanish film awards

- Date: 11 February 2023
- Site: FIBES Conference and Exhibition Centre, Seville, Spain
- Hosted by: Antonio de la Torre; Clara Lago
- Directed by: Tinet Rubira; Ángel Custodio
- Organized by: Academy of Cinematographic Arts and Sciences of Spain

Highlights
- Best Film: The Beasts
- Best Direction: Rodrigo Sorogoyen; The Beasts
- Best Actor: Denis Ménochet; The Beasts
- Best Actress: Laia Costa; Lullaby
- Most awards: The Beasts (9)
- Most nominations: The Beasts (17)

Television coverage
- Network: La 1
- Viewership: 2.68 million (23.4%)

The 37th Goya Awards ceremony, presented by the Academy of Cinematographic Arts and Sciences of Spain, took place at the FIBES Conference and Exhibition Centre in Seville, Andalusia on 11 February 2023.

== Background ==
On 31 May 2022, Seville was revealed as the host city, with the awards thereby set to return to the Andalusian capital after the 33rd edition. On 29 June 2022, the specific date of 11 February was disclosed by the academy president Fernando Méndez-Leite and the Mayor of Seville Antonio Muñoz, along with the announcement of the venue (the FIBES Conference and Exhibition Centre) and the reported increase from 4 to 5 nominations per category. In November 2022 Clara Lago and Antonio de la Torre were announced as the co-hosts of the gala, to be directed by Tinet Rubira and Ángel Custodio, with Fernando Pérez helming the screenwriting team.

The nominations were announced on 1 December 2022 by actresses Blanca Portillo and Nora Navas, The Beasts led the nominations with seventeen, followed by Prison 77 with sixteen and Alcarràs and Lullaby, both with eleven. Director Carlos Saura, recipient of the Honorary Goya Award, died on 10 February 2023, a day before the awards. He was honored posthumously during the ceremony.

Rodrigo Sorogoyen's thriller The Beasts received the most awards during the ceremony with nine wins, including Best Film. The bronze Goya statuettes were brownish instead of featuring their traditional greenish finishing as a consequence of the use of recycled bronze.

The ceremony, broadcast on La 1, was viewed by 2.684.000 million people (23,4%), being the most watched program at the primetime slot of the day.

== Winners and nominees ==
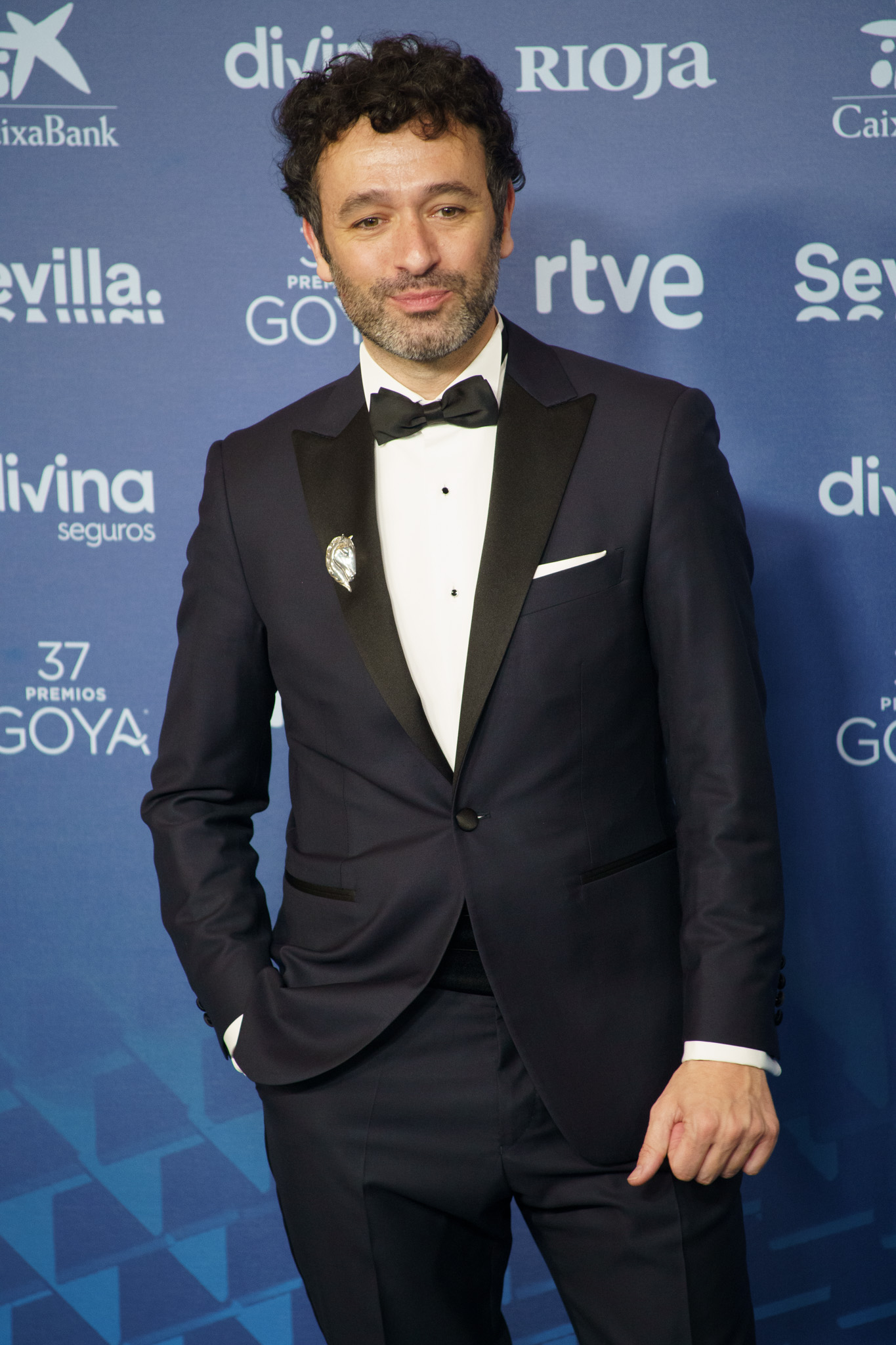
Rodrigo Sorogoyen, Best Director winner and Best Original Screenplay co-winner.

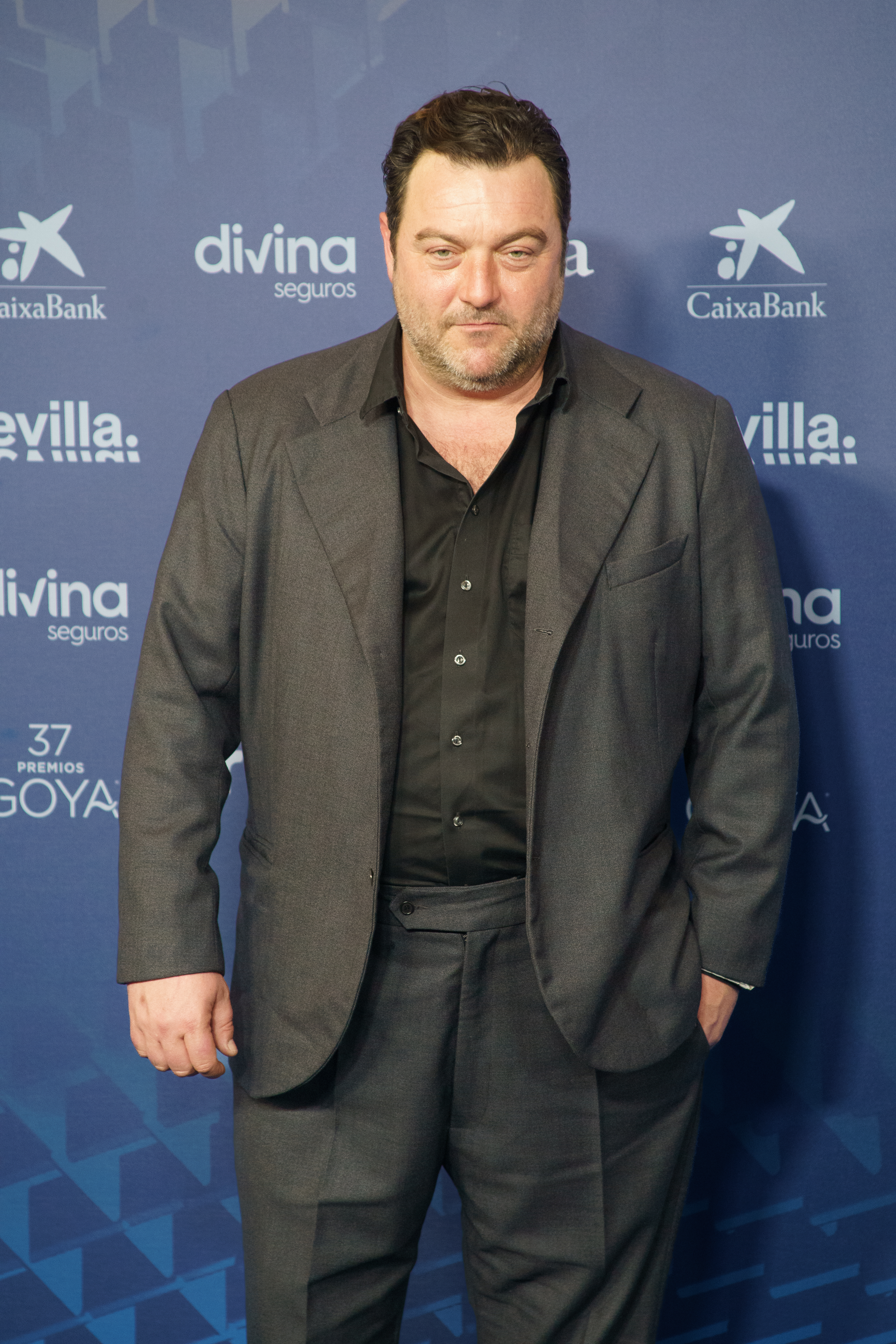
Denis Ménochet, Best Actor winner.

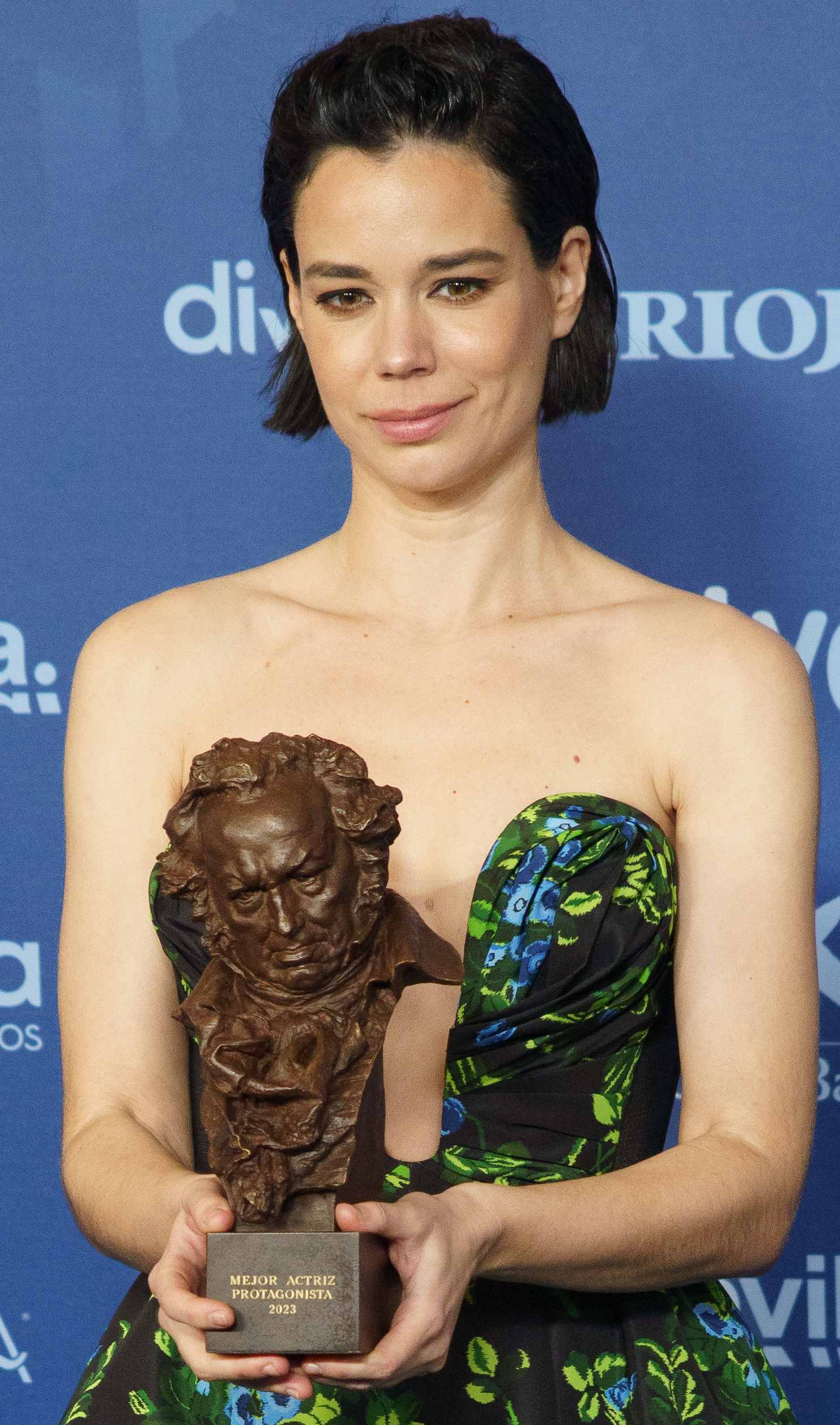
Laia Costa, Best Actress winner.

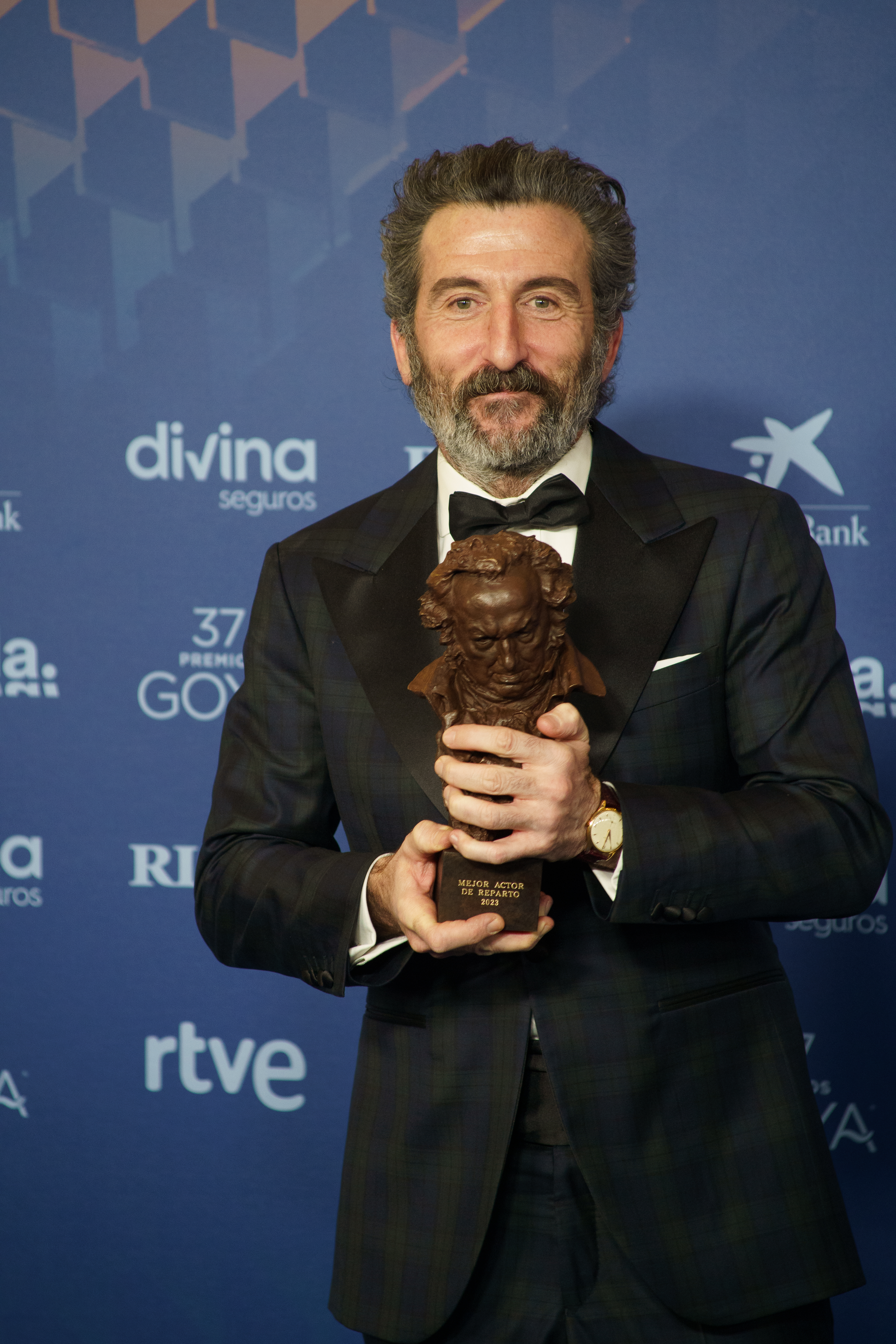
Luis Zahera, Best Supporting Actor winner.

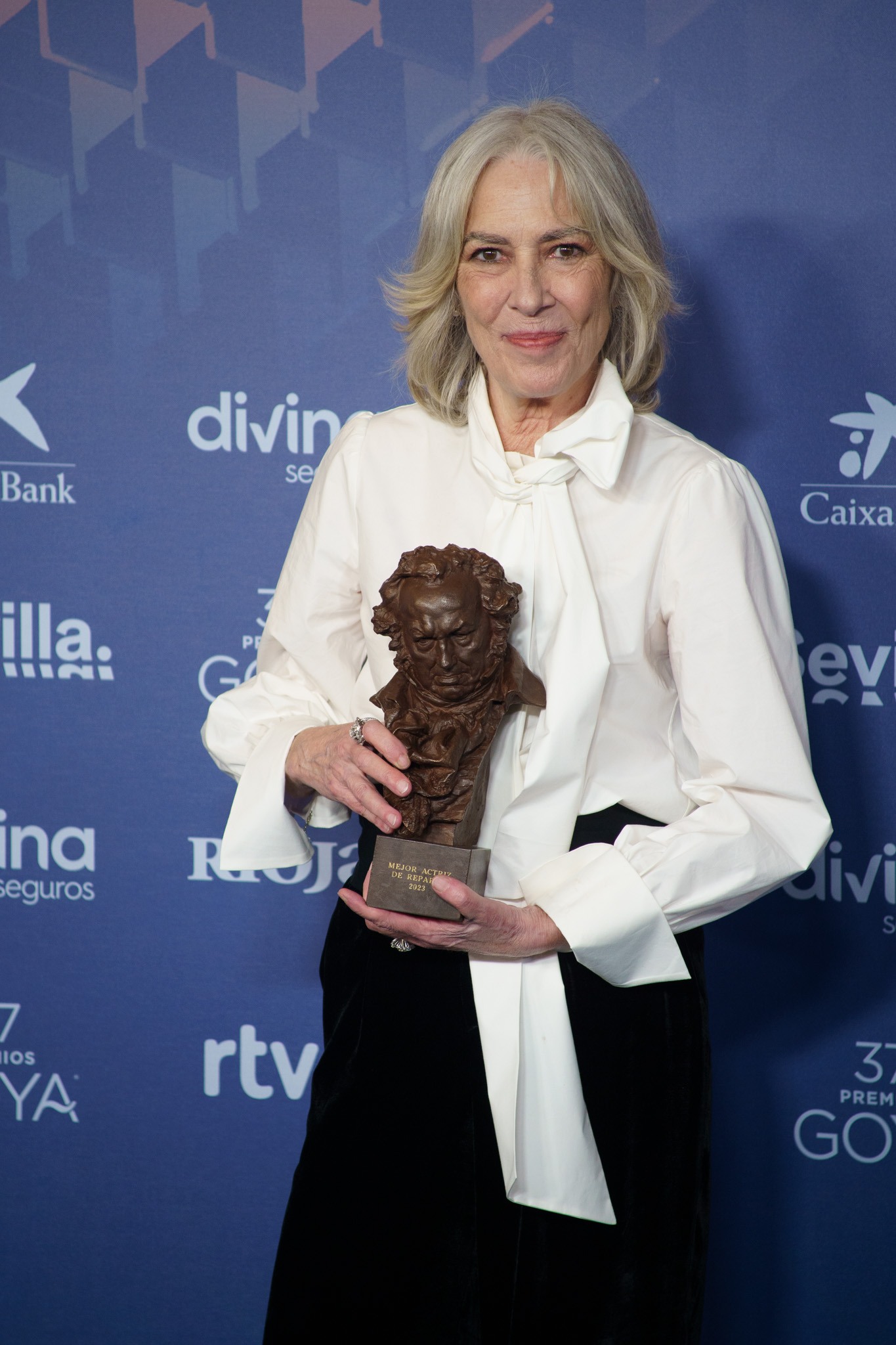
Susi Sánchez, Best Supporting Actress winner.

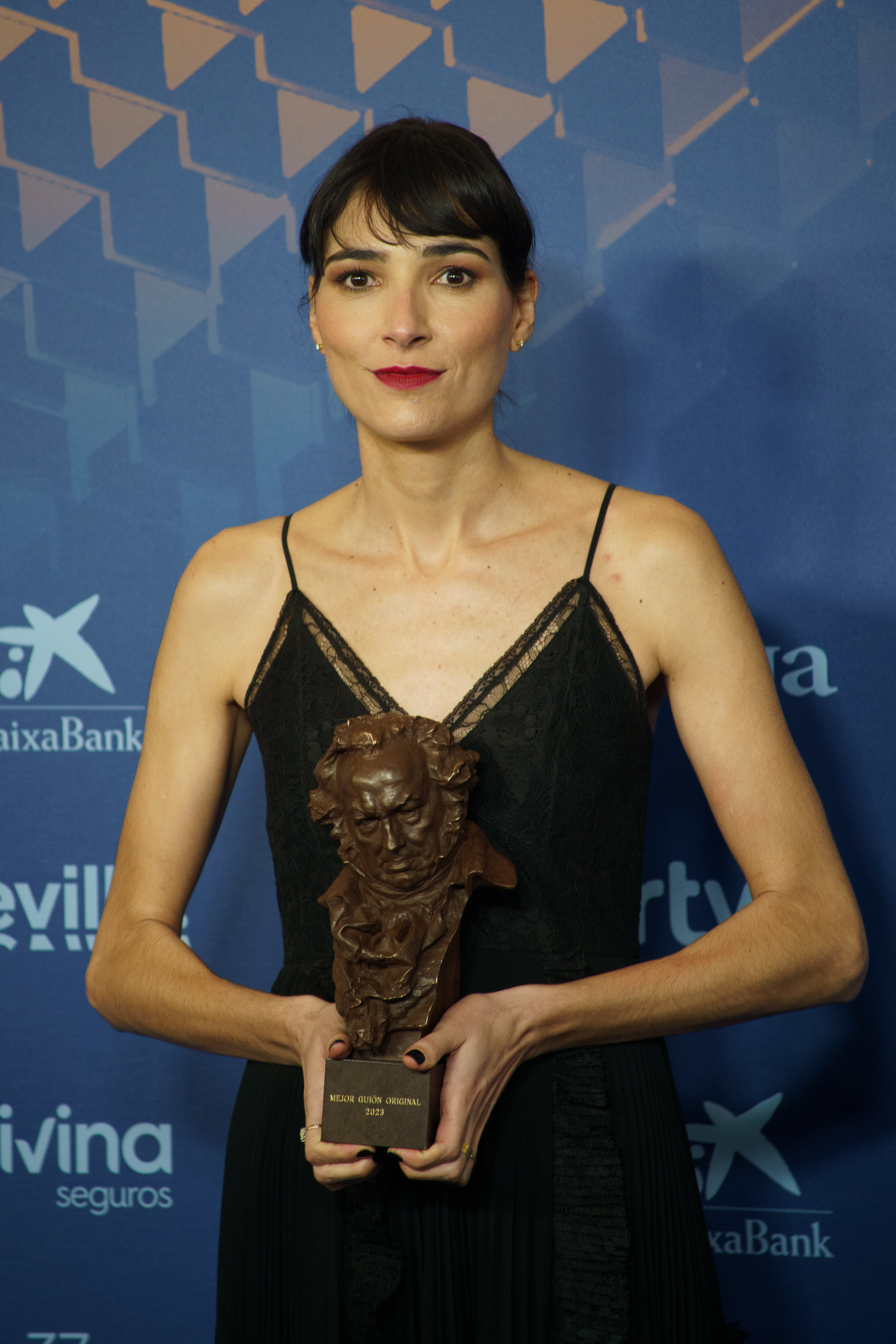
Isabel Peña, Best Original Screenplay co-winner.

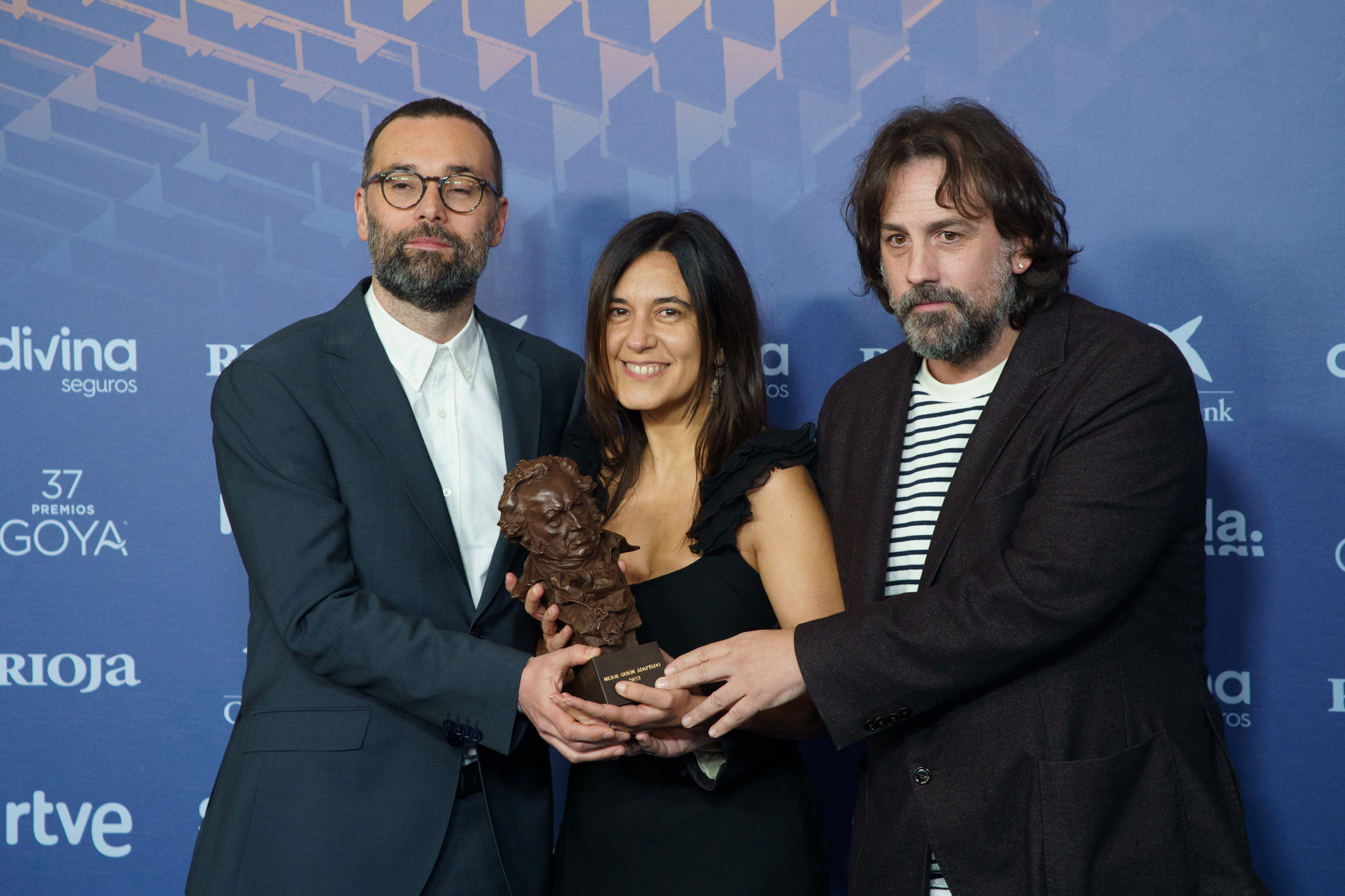
Fran Araújo, Isa Campo, and Isaki Lacuesta holding their Goya Award for Best Adapted Screenplay for One Year, One Night.

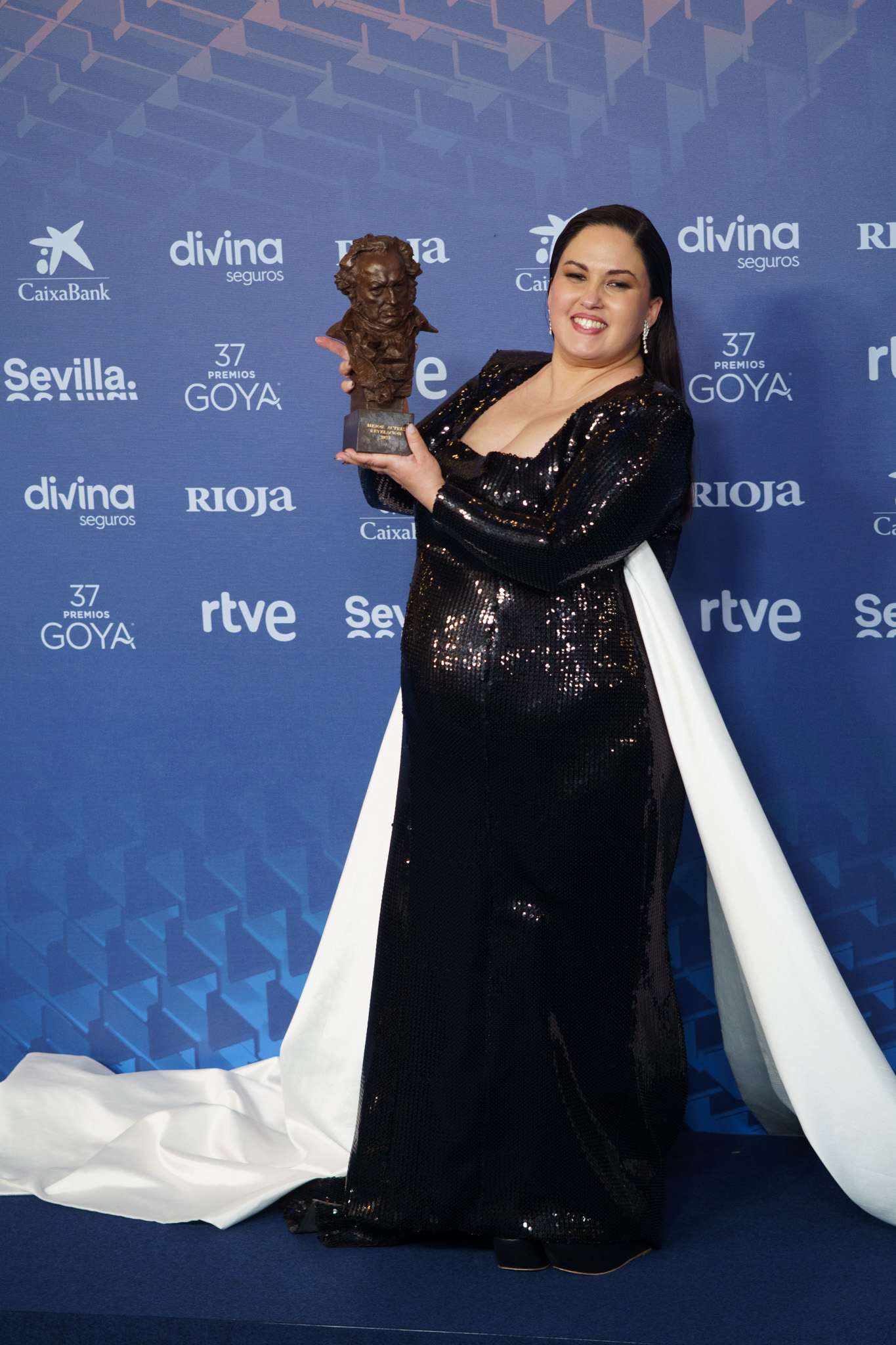
Laura Galán holding her Goya Award for Best New Actress.

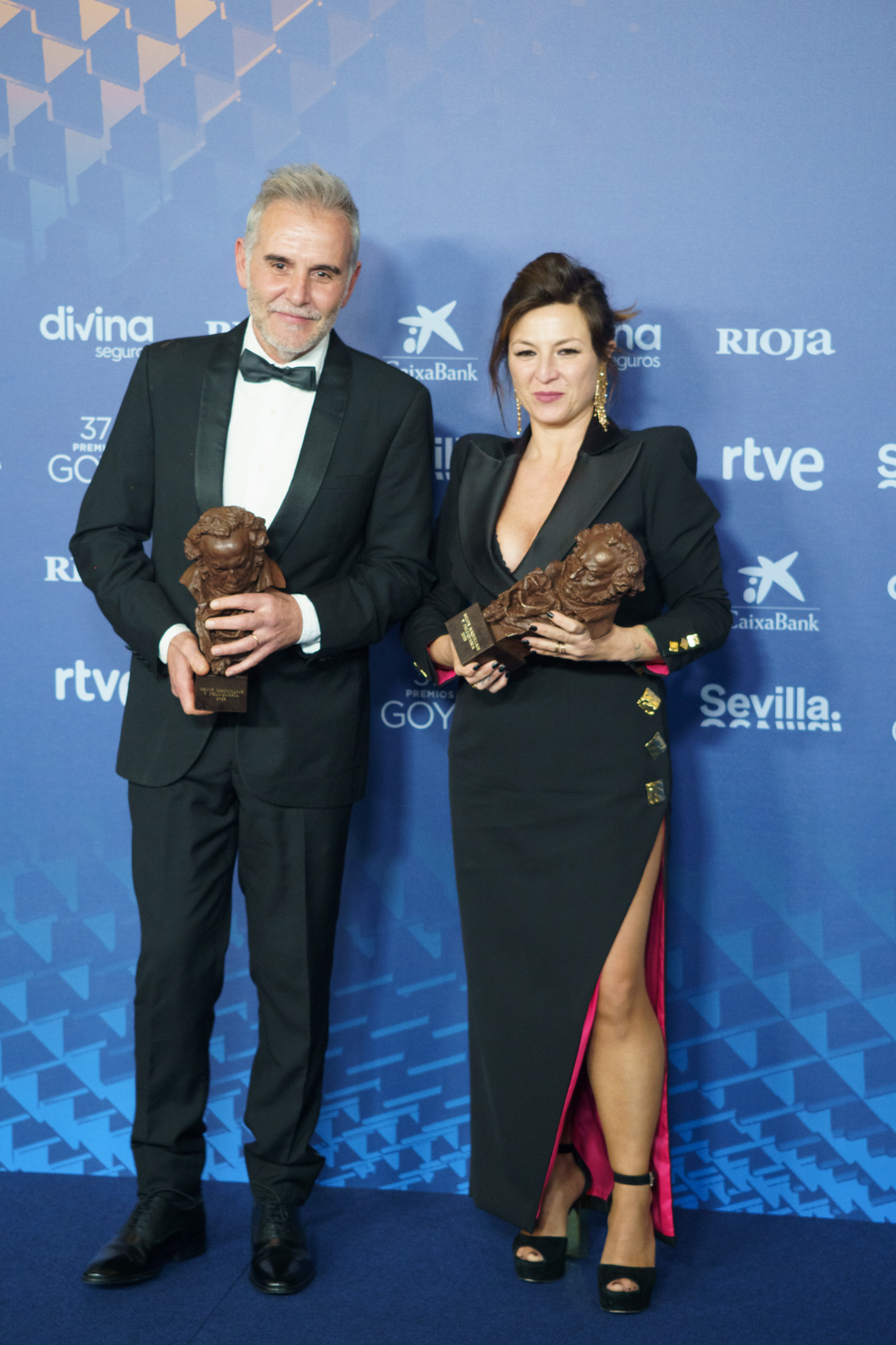
Félix Terrero and Yolanda Piña holding their Goyas for Best Makeup and Hairstyles.

The winners and nominees are listed as follows:

| Best Film: The Beasts; Alcarràs; Lullaby; Motherhood; Prison 77 | Best Director: Rodrigo Sorogoyen — The Beasts; Carla Simón — Alcarrás; Pilar Palomero — Motherhood; Carlos Vermut — Manticore; Alberto Rodríguez — Prison 77 |
| Best Actor: Denis Ménochet — The Beasts as Antoine; Luis Tosar — On the Fringe as Rafa; Nacho Sánchez — Manticore as Julián; Javier Gutiérrez — Prison 77 as José Pino; Miguel Herrán — Prison 77 as Manuel | Best Actress: Laia Costa — Lullaby as Amaia; Marina Foïs — The Beasts as Olga; Anna Castillo — Wild Flowers as Julia; Bárbara Lennie — God's Crooked Lines as Alice Gould; Vicky Luengo — Cork as Elena |
| Best Supporting Actor: Luis Zahera — The Beasts as Xan; Diego Anido — The Beasts as Lorenzo; Ramón Barea — Lullaby as Koldo; Fernando Tejero — Prison 77 as Marbella; Jesús Carroza — Prison 77 as El Negro | Best Supporting Actress: Susi Sánchez — Lullaby as Begoña; Marie Colomb — The Beasts as Marie; Carmen Machi — Piggy as Asun; Penélope Cruz — On the Fringe as Azucena; Ángela Cervantes — Motherhood as Penélope |
| Best New Actor: Telmo Irureta — The Rite of Spring as David; Albert Bosch — Alcarràs as Roger; Jordi Pujol Dolcet — Alcarràs as Quimet; Mikel Bustamante — Lullaby as Javi; Christian Checa — On the Fringe as Raúl | Best New Actress: Laura Galán — Piggy as Sara; Anna Otín — Alcarràs as Dolors; Luna Pamies — The Water as Ana; Valèria Sorolla — The Rite of Spring as Laura; Zoe Stein — Manticore as Diana |
| Best Original Screenplay: Isabel Peña, Rodrigo Sorogoyen — The Beasts; Arnau Vilaró, Carla Simón — Alcarràs; Alauda Ruiz de Azúa — Lullaby; Carlos Vermut — Manticore; Alberto Rodríguez, Rafael Cobos — Prison 77 | Best Adapted Screenplay: Fran Araújo, Isa Campo, Isaki Lacuesta — One Year, One Night; based on the book Paz, amor y death metal by Ramón González; Carlota Pereda — Piggy; based on the short film of the same name by Pereda; Paul Urkijo Alijo — Irati; based on the book El ciclo de Irati by J. L. Landa and J. Muñoz; Guillem Clua, Oriol Paulo — God's Crooked Lines; based on the novel Los renglones torcidos de Dios by Torcuato Luca de Tena; David Muñoz, Félix Viscarret — Staring at Strangers; based on the play Desde las sombras by Juan José Millás |
| Best Ibero-American Film: Argentina, 1985 · Argentina; 1976 · Chile; The Pack · Colombia; Prayers for the Stolen · Mexico; Utama · Bolivia | Best European Film: The Worst Person in the World · Norway; Belfast · United Kingdom; The Hand of God · Italy; Lost Illusions · France; Playground · Belgium |
| Best New Director: Alauda Ruiz de Azúa — Lullaby; Carlota Pereda — Piggy; Elena López Riera — The Water; Juan Diego Botto — On the Fringe; Mikel Gurrea — Cork | Best Animated Film: Unicorn Wars; Black Is Beltza II: Ainhoa; Inspector Sun and the Curse of the Black Widow; My Grandfather's Demons; Tad, the Lost Explorer and the Emerald Tablet |
| Best Cinematography: Álex de Pablo — The Beasts; Daniela Cajías — Alcarràs; Jon D. Domínguez — Lullaby; Arnau Valls Colomer — Official Competition; Álex Catalán — Prison 77 | Best Editing: Alberto del Campo — The Beasts; Ana Pfaff — Alcarràs; Andrés Gil — Lullaby; José M. G. Moyano — Prison 77; Fernando Franco, Sergi Díes — One Year, One Night |
| Best Art Direction: Pepe Domínguez del Olmo — Prison 77; Mónica Bernuy — Alcarràs; José Tirado — The Beasts; Melanie Antón — Piety; Sylvia Steinbrecht — God's Crooked Lines | Best Production Supervision: Manuela Ocón — Prison 77; Elisa Sirvent — Alcarràs; Carmen Sánchez de la Vega — The Beasts; Sara García — Piggy; María José Díez — Lullaby |
| Best Sound: Aitor Berenguer, Fabiola Ordoyo, Yasmina Praderas — The Beasts; Eva Valiño, Thomas Giorgi, Alejandro Castillo — Alcarràs; Asier González, Eva de la Fuente López, Roberto Fernández — Lullaby; Daniel de Zayas, Miguel Huete, Pelayo Gutiérrez, Valeria Arcieri — Prison 77; Amanda Villavieja, Eva Valiño, Marc Orts, Alejandro Castillo — One Year, One Night | Best Special Effects: Esther Ballesteros, Ana Rubio — Prison 77; Mariano García Marty, Jordi Costa — 13 Exorcisms; Óscar Abades, Ana Rubio — The Beasts; Jon Serrano, David Heras — Irati; Lluís Rivera, Laura Pedro — Valley of the Dead |
| Best Costume Design: Fernando García — Prison 77; Paola Torres — The Beasts; Nerea Torrijos — Irati; Suevia Sampelayo — Piety; Alberto Valcárcel — God's Crooked Lines; Cristina Rodríguez — Valley of the Dead | Best Makeup and Hairstyles: Yolanda Piña, Félix Terrero — Prison 77; Irene Pedrosa, Jesús Gil — The Beasts; Paloma Lozano, Nacho Díaz — Piggy; Sarai Rodríguez, Raquel González, Óscar de Monte — Piety; Montse Santfeliu, Carolina Atxukarro, Pablo Perona — God's Crooked Lines |
| Best Original Score: Olivier Arson — The Beasts; Aránzazu Calleja, Maite Arroitajauregi — Irati; Iván Palomares — Dancing on Glass; Fernando Velázquez — God's Crooked Lines; Julio de la Rosa — Prison 77 | Best Original Song: "Sintiéndolo mucho" by Joaquín Sabina and Leiva — Sintiéndolo mucho; "En los márgenes" by Eduardo Cruz and María Rozalén — On the Fringe; "Izena duena bada" by Aránzazu Calleja, Maite Arroitajauregi "Mursego" and Paul Urkijo Alijo) — Irati; "Un paraíso en el sur" by Paloma Peñarrubia Ruiz and Vanesa Benítez Zamora — La vida chipén; "Batalla" by Joseba Beristain — Unicorn Wars |
| Best Fictional Short Film: Arquitectura emocional 1959; Chaval; Chords; La entrega; Sorda | Best Animated Short Film: Loop; Amanece la noche más larga; Amarradas; La prima cosa; La primavera siempre vuelve |
| Best Documentary Film: Labordeta, un hombre sin más; A las mujeres de España. María Lejárraga; The Yellow Ceiling; Oswald. El falsificador; Sintiéndolo mucho | Best Documentary Short Film: Maldita. A Love Song to Sarajevo; Dancing with Rosa; La gàbia; Memoria; Trazos del alma |

=== Honorary Goya ===
- Carlos Saura

=== International Goya Award ===
- Juliette Binoche

=== Films with multiple nominations and awards ===
Films that received multiple nominations
| Nominations | Film |
|---|---|
| 17 | The Beasts |
| 16 | Prison 77 |
| 11 | Alcarràs |
| 11 | Lullaby |
| 6 | God's Crooked Lines |
| 6 | Piggy |
| 5 | On the Fringe |
| 5 | Irati |
| 4 | Manticore |
| 3 | One Year, One Night |
| 3 | Motherhood |
| 3 | Piety |
| 2 | The Rite of Spring |
| 2 | Cork |
| 2 | The Water |
| 2 | Valley of the Dead |
| 2 | Unicorn Wars |
| 2 | Sintiéndolo mucho |

Films that received multiple awards
| Awards | Film |
|---|---|
| 9 | The Beasts |
| 5 | Prison 77 |
| 3 | Lullaby |

== Presenters and performers ==
The following individuals, listed in order of appearance, presented awards or performed musical numbers.

=== Presenters ===
- Carmen Maura – presented the Honorary Goya Award to Carlos Saura
- Álvaro Morte and Aitana Sánchez-Gijón – presented Best Supporting Actor
- Luna Fulgencio and Toni Acosta – presented Best Makeup and Hairstyles
- Amaia Salamanca and Antonio Dechent – presented Best Special Effects
- Petra Martínez and Belén Cuesta – presented Best Supporting Actress
- Elena Irureta and Tamar Novas – presented Best New Actor
- Eneko Sagardoy and Carolina Yuste – presented Best Art Direction
- Ingrid García-Jonsson and Arturo Valls – presented Best Sound
- Paco Delgado and Milena Smit – presented Best Costume Design
- Cecilia Suárez and Alberto Ammann – presented Best Ibero-American Film
- Miren Ibarguren and David Verdaguer – presented Best Production Supervision
- C. Tangana and Carla Quílez – presented Best Cinematography
- Julia Juániz and Álex González – presented Best Editing
- Berta Vázquez and Belén Rueda – presented Best European Film
- Isabel Coixet – presented the International Goya Award to Juliette Binoche
- Abril Zamora, Javier Calvo and Javier Ambrossi – presented Best New Actress
- María Luisa San José and María Pedraza – presented Best Fictional Short Film
- Fernando Esteso and Pol Monen – presented Best Documentary Short Film
- Marta Fernández Muro and Manu Ríos – presented Best Animated Short Film
- Mar Coll and Clara Roquet – presented Best New Director
- India Martínez and María José Llergo – presented Best Original Song
- Carlos Cuevas and Martiño Rivas – presented Best Original Score
- Paula Ortiz and Daniel Sánchez Arévalo – presented Best Original Screenplay
- Manuel Martín Cuenca and Leticia Dolera – presented Best Adapted Screenplay
- Macarena Gómez and Alberto Mielgo – presented Best Animated Film
- Jordi Évole and Almudena Carracedo – presented Best Documentary Film
- Asier Etxeandia and Leonardo Sbaraglia – presented Best Actor
- Blanca Portillo and Nora Navas – presented Best Actress
- J. A. Bayona and Mitra Farahani – presented Best Director
- Penélope Cruz, Miriam Díaz Aroca, Ariadna Gil and Maribel Verdú – presented Best Film

=== Performers ===
| Artist(s) | Song(s) |
|---|---|
| Manuel Carrasco | "Cantares" |
| Natalia Lafourcade | "Porque te vas" |
| Lolita | "Pena, penita, pena" |
| Israel Fernández Pablo López | "Alegría de vivir" |
| Bely Basarte Guitarricadelafuente | "Me cuesta tanto olvidarte" "Qué bonito" during the annual In Memoriam tribute |

== In Memoriam ==
The In Memoriam tribute, accompanied by a musical performing, paid tribute to the following individuals:

- Juan Pedro Acacio. Composer
- Regina Álvarez Lorenzo. Director and screenwriter
- Beatriz Álvarez-Guerra. Actress
- Pepe Antequera. Radio announcer and TV and voice actor
- Loritz Apaolaza. Production assistant
- Luis Argüello. Costume art director
- María Arjona. Actress
- Antonio Astola. Cinema projectionist
- Juan Antonio Bermúdez. Programmer and film critic
- Mario Beut. Voice actor, announcer and presenter
- Claudio Biern Boyd. Producer, screenwriter and animation director
- Luís Bonet Mojica. Journalist and film critic
- Pedro Brandariz. Actor and producer
- Josefina Calatayud. Actress
- Miguel Camáñez. Sales manager of Lauren Films, Vértigo Films y Karma Films
- Carlos Caraglia. Filmmaker and camera operator
- Martín Costa. Film director
- Enrique Cuellar. Film producer
- José Manuel Cuellar. Journalist and film critic
- María Fernanda D´Ocón. Actress
- Jorge de Cominges. Journalist and film critic
- Juan Diego. Actor
- Neureddine El Attab. Actor
- Núria Feliu. Cantante y Actress
- Julián Fernández. movie machinist
- José Manuel “Pepiño” Fernández Blanco. Actor
- Jorge Fons. Film director
- Susana Galmés. Actress
- Silvia Gambino. Actress
- Xosé Garrido. Director of photography and photographer
- Carlos Gil. Director
- Saskia Giró. Actress
- Txus González. Characterizer
- Rosa Guiñón. Voice actress
- Pep Guinyol. Actor
- José Guirao. Cultural Manager and Minister of Culture and Sports 2018-2020
- Hilario Hernández. Hairdresser and makeup artist
- Antonio Ibáñez. Actor
- José Antonio Izaguirre. Actor
- José Luis Jiménez Resano “El Maño”. Stuntman
- Jordi Joani. Gaffer
- Juan Jurado Alcaide. Director of photography, producer and assistant director
- Fernando ´La Estrella`. Artist
- Ouka Lele. Photographer and painter
- Chete Lera. Actor
- Gina Lollobrigida. Actress
- Marga Maro. Screenwriter
- Javier Marías. Novelist and screenwriter
- Luis Marín. Voice doblaje
- Rosa Mariscal. Actress
- Eugenio Martín. Director
- José Santiago Martínez. Actor
- Antonio Martínez Mir. Production assistant
- Fernando Merino. Actor
- Pablo Milanés. Composer and singer-songwriter
- Gracia Montes. Singer
- Julián Obreros. Movie machinist
- Javier Orgaz. Carpenter
- Enrique Ortuño. Executive producer
- Valentín ´Tinico` Panero. Director and producer
- Diego Pantoja. Flamenco artist
- Irene Papas. Actress and singer
- Joaquín Parra. Cinema weapons master and actor
- Tony Partearroyo. Writer, critic and essayist
- Juan Antonio Quintana. Actor
- Ángel Rabat. Film collector
- Rafel Ramis. Actor
- José María Ramos Rodríguez. Author and film editor
- Antonio Requena. Actor
- Berta Riaza. Actress
- Carolo Ruiz. Actor
- José Ruiz. Journalist and film researcher
- Enrique Sacristán Rodrigo. Chief Lighting Technician
- Tomás Sáez. Actor
- Manel Salas Salmerón. Gaffer
- Luis Fernando Sánchez Arrabal. Voice actor and Announcer
- Alfonso Santacana. Film editor
- Eduardo Santana. Production management
- Ernesto Sebastián. Display and distributor
- Llorenç Soler. Actor
- Hugo Stuven. Producer and director
- Susan Taff. Actress
- Fina Torres. Actress
- Pedro Valentín. Actor
- Jordi Valera. Announcer and voice actor
- José Valera. Head of transport
- Carlos Vega. Actor
- Manolo Vieira. Comedian and actor
- Domingo Villar. Novelist and screenwriter
- Agustí Villaronga. Director and screenwriter
- Jesús Yagüe. Director and screenwriter
- Carlos Saura. Goya of Honor 2023

== See also ==
- 10th Feroz Awards
- 15th Gaudí Awards
- 2nd Carmen Awards
