= The Beasts =

2022 film by Rodrigo Sorogoyen

- Poster by James Verdesoto
- Galician: As bestas
- Directed by: Rodrigo Sorogoyen
- Written by: Isabel Peña; Rodrigo Sorogoyen
- Produced by: Thomas Pibarot; Anne-Laure Labadie; Jean Labadie; Rodrigo Sorogoyen; Nacho Lavilla; Eduardo Villanueva; Sandra Tapia Diaz; Ignasi Estapé; Ibon Cormenzana
- Starring: Denis Ménochet; Marina Foïs; Luis Zahera; Diego Anido; Marie Colomb
- Cinematography: Alex de Pablo
- Edited by: Alberto del Campo
- Music by: Olivier Arson
- Production companies: Arcadia Motion Pictures; Caballo Films; Cronos Entertainment; Le Pacte
- Distributed by: Le Pacte (France); A Contracorriente Films (Spain)
- Release dates: 26 May 2022 (Cannes); 20 July 2022 (France); 11 November 2022 (Spain)
- Running time: 137 minutes
- Countries: Spain; France
- Languages: French; Spanish; Galician
- Budget: €3.5 million
- Box office: $10.3 million

The Beasts (Galician: As bestas) is a 2022 thriller film directed and produced by Rodrigo Sorogoyen, who wrote the screenplay with Isabel Peña. A co-production between Spain and France, it features Spanish, French, and Galician dialogue. It stars Denis Ménochet, Marina Foïs, Luis Zahera, Diego Anido, and Marie Colomb.

The film is loosely inspired by real events involving a Dutch couple in Santoalla, a semi-abandoned hamlet of the Galician municipality of Petín, from 2010 to 2014. It follows a married French couple (Ménochet and Foïs) settled in the Galician countryside, exploring issues of xenophobia and escalating hostility between neighbors buoyed by a conflict vis-à-vis a wind farm project, arriving at a point of no return.

The film made its world premiere at the 2022 Cannes Film Festival on 26 May 2022, with a festival run that also included screenings in San Sebastián, Tokyo and Chicago. It was released theatrically in France on 20 July 2022 and in Spain on 11 November 2022. The Beasts earned a leading 17 nominations (including five for acting) at the 37th Goya Awards and won nine, including Best Film, Best Director, Best Original Screenplay, Best Actor for Ménochet, and Best Supporting Actor for Zahera. It also won the César Award for Best Foreign Film.

== Plot ==
Set in the Galician countryside, the story follows a French couple (Antoine and Olga Denis) settled in a small village seeking to connect with nature, growing and selling their own eco-friendly crops and rehabilitating abandoned properties so they can be reinhabited. However their presence arouses hostility from a couple of neighbors, the Anta brothers Xan (an inflexible man used to interacting under a might makes right worldview) and Lorenzo (with reduced mental capacity in the wake of an accident he suffered when he was young), pitted against the French at the opposing side of a dispute regarding the sale of land to a wind energy company. Antoine and Olga are opposed to the deal and block it, whilst Xan, along with most of the village, wants the money in order to leave the countryside and have a chance for a better life for him and his family.

Antoine reports the hostile behaviour of the Anta brothers, such as trespassing on his farm and urinating on his property, to the local Guardia Civil, but they do not take his concerns seriously, insisting they should solve their dispute through dialogue. In an attempt to record evidence of their behaviour, Antoine begins surreptitiously filming the brothers, but they quickly notice and are enraged further. Antoine discovers two batteries in the farm's well, poisoning their tomato harvest with lead. He angrily confronts the brothers and trespasses in their residence. The law enforcement agents have no evidence to charge the brothers with sabotaging the farm and consider both parties responsible for antagonising each other. Driving along a country road at night, Antoine and Olga find the path blocked by the brothers' vehicle; the Antas approach the couple with a shotgun and repeatedly bang on the window. Olga confesses she is fearful for their safety, believing they would have murdered Antoine if she was not present.

The other remaining villager opposed to the wind farm development dies, with his son in favour of accepting the deal and leaving Antoine and Olga the only remaining holdouts. Antoine meets the brothers in the local pub and explains that, if another vote found him to be the only resident opposed to the deal, he would accept the majority opinion and leave the village. However, due to the sabotage of their harvest, they need to remain for at least a year to recoup their losses, by which time Xan believes the developers will take their interest elsewhere. Walking his dog in a remote forest, Antoine is followed and approached by the brothers. Anticipating a violent confrontation, he sets his camera to record and hides it in a clearing. A struggle ensues, and Antoine is smothered to death by the brothers.

A year later, Antoine's disappearance remains unsolved. Olga continues to run the farm alone, and spends her free time scouring the countryside for Antoine's body or evidence of his murder. Antoine and Olga's daughter Marie arrives to visit from France. She is disturbed that Olga lives so near to her father's murderers, insisting that she needs to accept Antoine's death and leave, but Olga refuses. Olga eventually discovers the battered camera and gives the memory card to the Guardia Civil, but they tell her it is irretrievably corrupted. However, they agree to reopen the search around the site of the camera. Olga visits the Anta brothers and insists on speaking to their elderly mother. She tells the mother that her sons will soon be sent to prison, and then the two women will both be alone in the village. Shortly after, Antoine's body is discovered, and as Olga is driven to identify the body she passes the Anta brothers' mother walking alone in the road.

== Cast ==
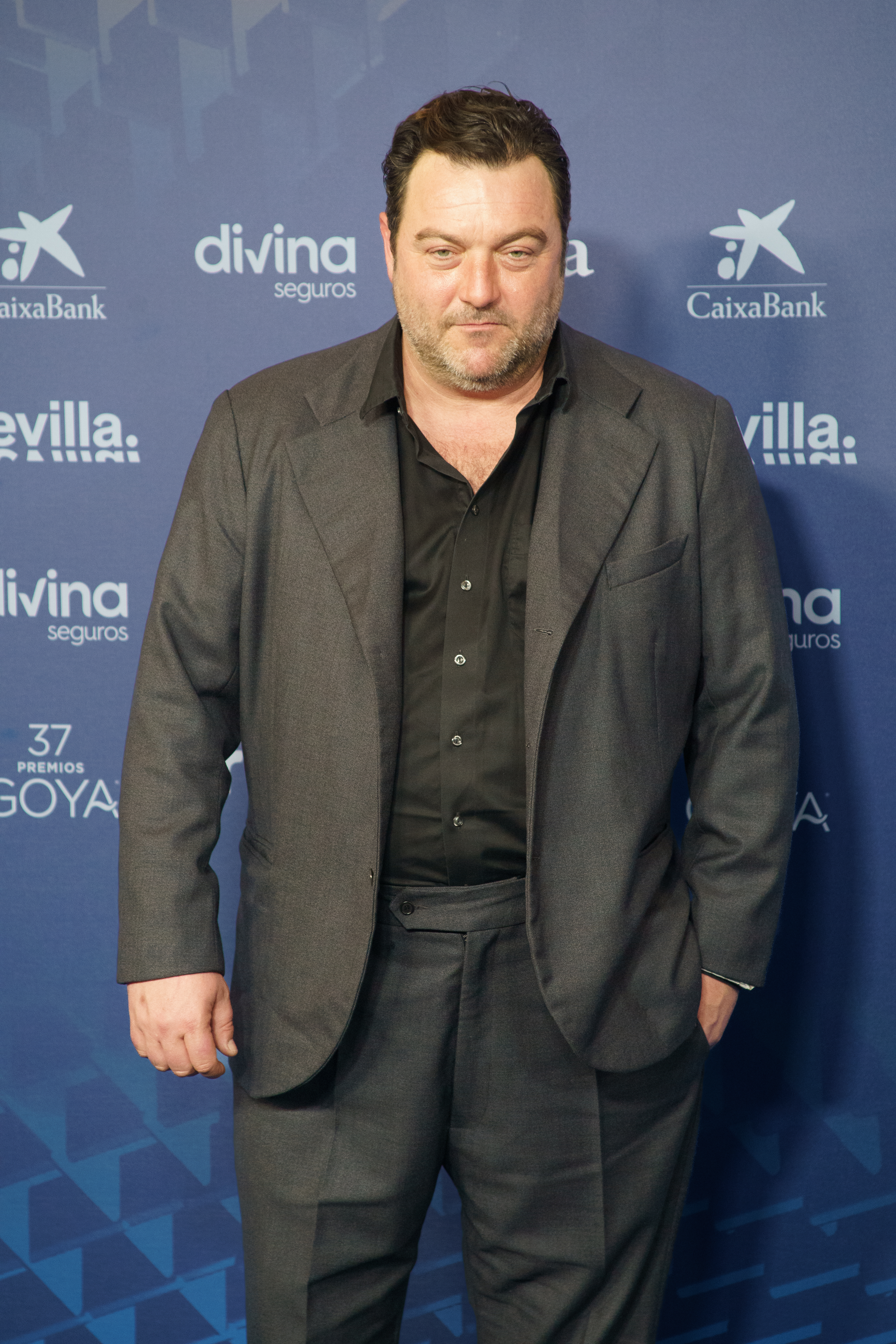
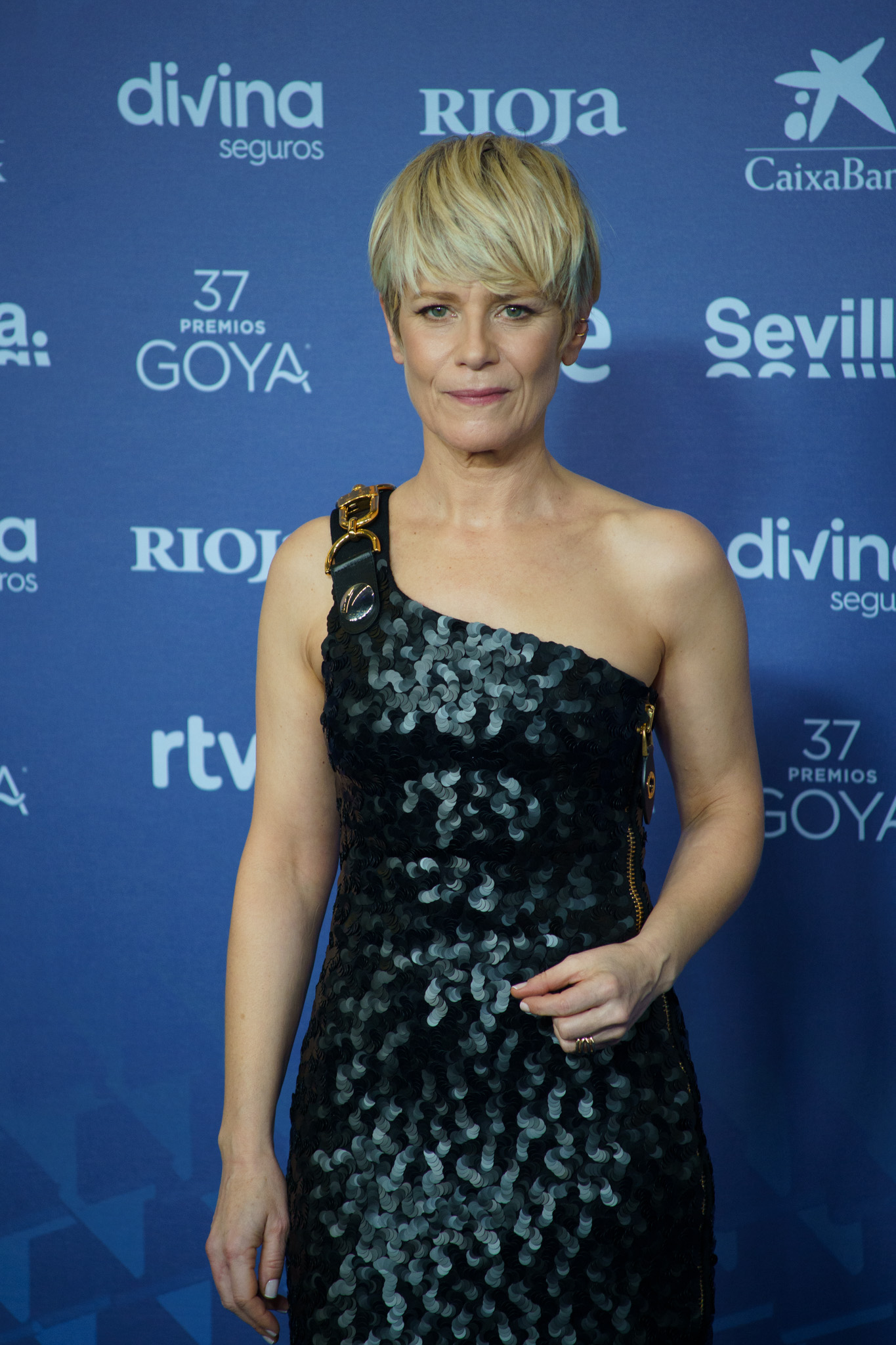
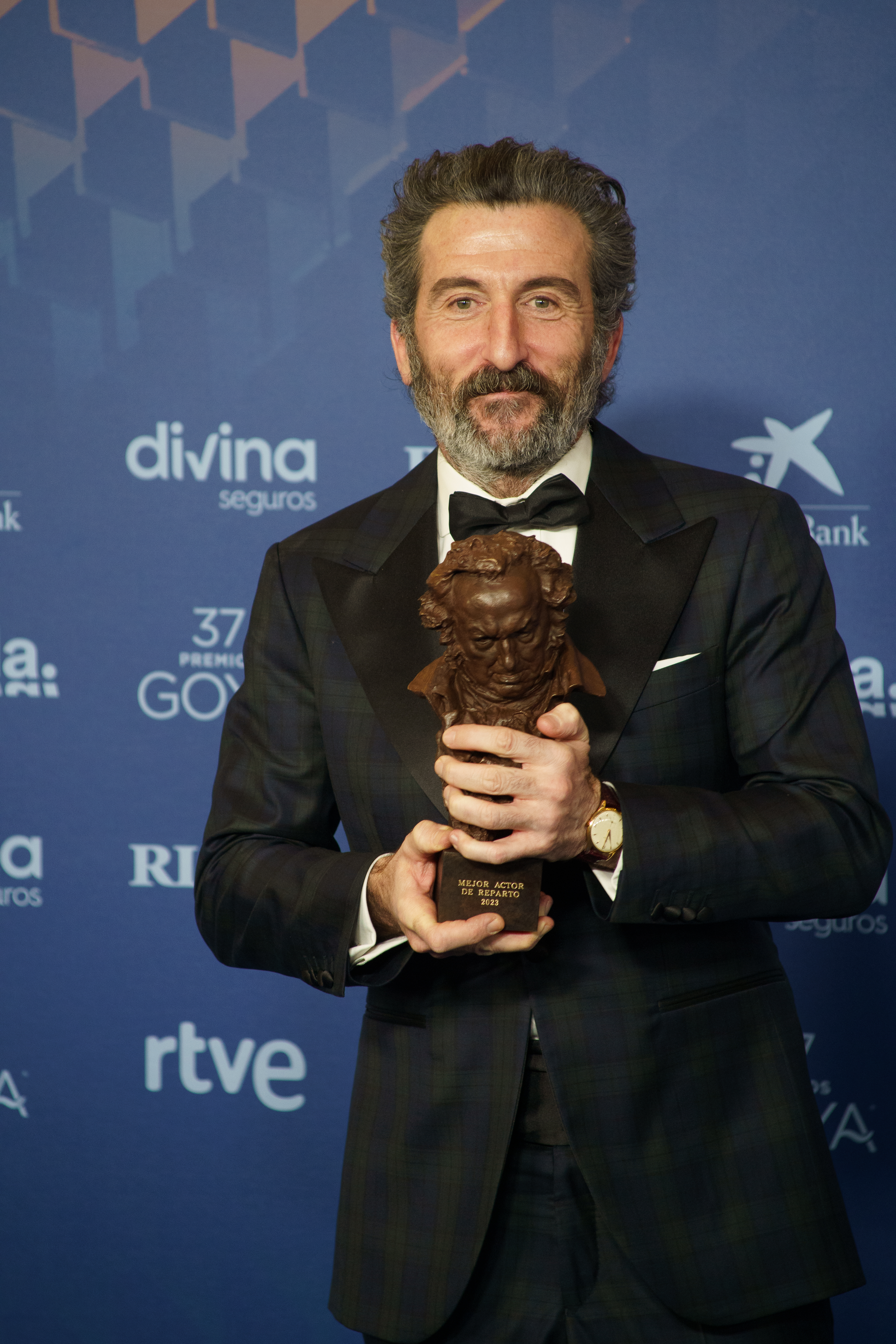
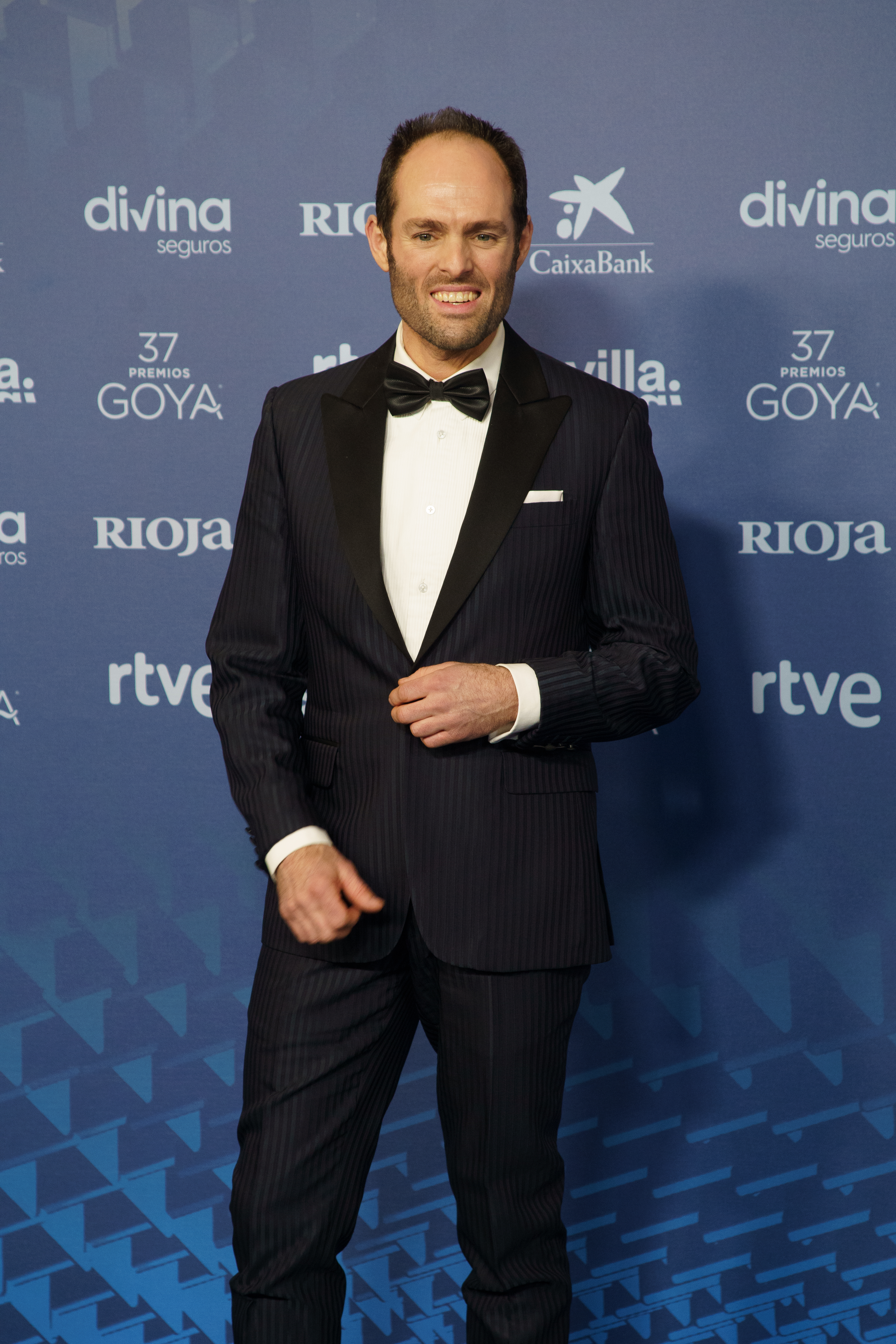
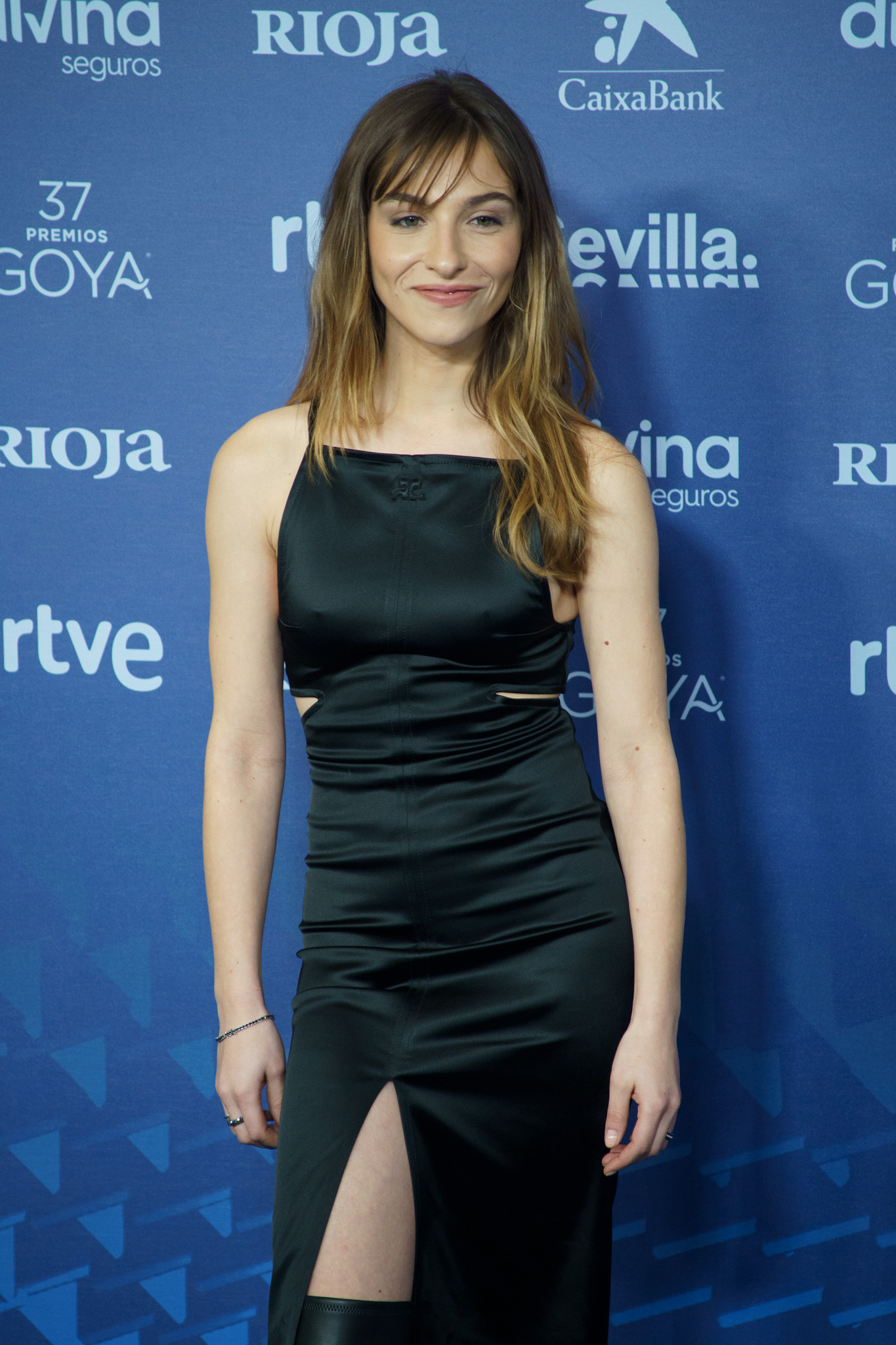
Cast members Ménochet, Foïs, Zahera, Anido, and Colomb attending the 2023 Goya Awards
- Denis Ménochet as Antoine
- Marina Foïs as Olga
- Luis Zahera as Xan
- Diego Anido as Lorenzo
- Marie Colomb as Marie
- Machi Salgado
- Luisa Merelas

== Production ==
The film was produced by Arcadia Motion Pictures, Caballo Films, Cronos Entertainment and Le Pacte, with the participation of RTVE, Movistar+, Canal+ and Cine+, support from Eurimages, and funding from ICAA. The screenplay was penned by Sorogoyen's long-time collaborator Isabel Peña and Sorogoyen himself. The production crew also features other Sorogoyen's recurring collaborators (such as Olivier Arson as composer, Alex de Pablo as director of cinematography and Alberto del Campo as film editor).

Sorogoyen reported that he would shoot the film "as a western". Filming began on 16 September 2021 and wrapped on 13 December 2021. Shooting locations included El Bierzo and inland Galicia.

== Release ==
The Beasts debuted in the 'Cannes Premiere' section at the 75th Cannes Film Festival on 26 May 2022. Distributed by Le Pacte, the film opened in French theatres on 20 July 2022. It also screened at the 70th San Sebastián International Film Festival in September 2022, as part of the 'Pearls' film slate. It was also selected in the 35th Tokyo International Film Festival's main slate (for its Asian premiere). Distributed by A Contracorriente Films, it was theatrically released in Spain on 11 November 2022. By the end of the year, it had grossed €3.6 million at the Spanish box office, the 6th highest-grossing Spanish film overall.

Latido Films licensed US rights on the film to Greenwich Entertainment, which released it in limited theaters on 28 July 2023. UK/Ireland distributor Curzon also acquired rights to the film.

== Reception ==
=== Critical response ===
According to the review aggregation Rotten Tomatoes, The Beasts has a 99% approval rating based on 69 reviews from critics, with an average rating of 8.5/10. The site's critics consensus reads, "Rodrigo Sorogoyen throws us into rural Galicia with The Beasts, where tension and unease spread like wildfire in a scorching tale of decayed human nature". Metacritic assigned the film a weighted average score of 85 out of 100, based on 17 critics, indicating "universal acclaim".

Wendy Ide of ScreenDaily deemed the film to be "a terrific psychological thriller and a brooding, muscular piece of filmmaking which makes the most of both the Galician backdrop and the imposing physicality of Menochet and, as his nemesis Xan, the remarkable Luis Zahera.

Manu Yáñez of Fotogramas rated the film 3 out of 5 stars, writing that Sorogoyen "shows his talent for generating situations charged with blatant hostility", assessing "the way Sorogoyen manages the tempo of each scene" to be the best about the film, while drawing out the "grotesque portrait of the inhabitants of rural Galicia", close to caricature, as the worst thing about it.

Philipp Engel of Cinemanía rated the film 4½ stars, pointing out at two sequence shots working in a mirror-like fashion (respectively concerning Menochet, Zahera and Anido, and Foïs and Colomb) as the heart of the film, underscoring The Beasts to be "a beastly film, although not entirely rounded, due to [featuring] a complexity that moves it away from the purity of the western".

Raquel Hernández Luján of HobbyConsolas rated The Beasts with 85 points ("very good"), highlighting the tension throughout its first hour as well as the performances by Ménochet, Foïs, and Zahera as the film's standouts.

Eric Ortiz García of ScreenAnarchy assessed that the film "stands out for its accomplished sequences of mundane tension in crescendo and for the complex background of the conflict".

Marta Medina of El Confidencial rated the film 4 out of 5 stars assessing it to have its best ally in "its formal cleanliness, in its conciseness".

In August 2022, the members of the Academy of Cinematographic Arts and Sciences of Spain selected The Beasts in their shortlist of three pre-selections for their submission to the 95th Academy Awards for Best International Feature Film alongside Alcarràs and Lullaby.

=== Top ten lists ===
The film appeared on a number of critics' top ten lists of the best European films of 2022:

- 3rd — Cineuropa (Aurore Engelen)
- 6th — Cineuropa (Alfonso Rivera)
- 7th — Cineuropa (Vittoria Scarpa)
- 9th — Cineuropa (Júlia Olmo)

In addition, it also appeared on top ten lists of the best Spanish films of 2022:

- 1st — Cadena SER (Elio Castro)
- 2nd — Cadena SER ('El cine en la SER' critics)
- 2nd — ABC (Oti Rodríguez Marchante)
- 2nd — Vanity Fair (Juan Sanguino & Paloma Rando)
- 3rd — Cadena SER (Pepa Blanes)
- 3rd — El Cultural (Juan Sardá)
- 4th — El Confidencial (Marta Medina)
- 4th — El Español ('Series&más' critics)
- 4th — El Cultural (Javier Yuste)
- 4th — El Mundo (Luis Martínez)
- 5th — El Periódico de Catalunya (critics)
- 6th — El Cultural (Begoña Donat)
- 6th — Cadena SER (Jose M. Romero)
- 9th — El Cultural (Carlos Reviriego)

=== Accolades ===
Award	Date of ceremony	Category	Recipient(s)	Result	Ref.
San Sebastián International Film Festival	24 September 2022	City of Donostia / San Sebastian Audience Award for Best European Film	The Beasts	Won	
Chicago International Film Festival	23 October 2022	Gold Hugo	The Beasts	Nominated	
Chicago International Film Festival	23 October 2022	Silver Hugo for Best Ensemble Performance	Denis Ménochet, Marina Foïs, Luis Zahera, Diego Anido, and Marie Colomb	Won	
Tokyo International Film Festival	2 November 2022	Grand Prix	The Beasts	Won	
Tokyo International Film Festival	2 November 2022	Best Director	Rodrigo Sorogoyen	Won	
Tokyo International Film Festival	2 November 2022	Best Actor	Denis Ménochet	Won	
Forqué Awards	17 December 2022	Best Film	The Beasts	Won	
Forqué Awards	17 December 2022	Best Film Actor	Denis Ménochet	Won	
Lumière Awards	16 January 2023	Best Actor	Denis Ménochet	Nominated	
Lumière Awards	16 January 2023	Best International Co-Production	The Beasts	Won	
Feroz Awards	28 January 2023	Best Drama Film	Ignasi Estapé, Sandra Tapia, Ibon Cormenzana, Eduardo Villanueva	Won	
Feroz Awards	28 January 2023	Best Director	Rodrigo Sorogoyen	Nominated	
Feroz Awards	28 January 2023	Best Screenplay	Rodrigo Sorogoyen, Isabel Peña	Nominated	
Feroz Awards	28 January 2023	Best Actor in a Film	Denis Ménochet	Nominated	
Feroz Awards	28 January 2023	Best Actress in a Film	Marina Foïs	Nominated	
Feroz Awards	28 January 2023	Best Supporting Actor in a Film	Diego Anido	Nominated	
Feroz Awards	28 January 2023	Best Supporting Actor in a Film	Luis Zahera	Won	
Feroz Awards	28 January 2023	Best Soundtrack	Olivier Arson	Won	
Feroz Awards	28 January 2023	Best Trailer	Miguel Ángel Trudu	Nominated	
Feroz Awards	28 January 2023	Best Film Poster	Jordi Rins, Lucía Faraig	Nominated	
Carmen Awards	4 February 2023	Best Non-Andalusian Film	The Beasts	Won	
CEC Medals	6 February 2023	Best Film	The Beasts	Won	
CEC Medals	6 February 2023	Best Director	Rodrigo Sorogoyen	Won	
CEC Medals	6 February 2023	Best Actor	Denis Ménochet	Won	
CEC Medals	6 February 2023	Best Actress	Marina Foïs	Won	
CEC Medals	6 February 2023	Best Supporting Actor	Luis Zahera	Won	
CEC Medals	6 February 2023	Best Supporting Actor	Diego Anido	Nominated	
CEC Medals	6 February 2023	Best Supporting Actress	Marie Colomb	Nominated	
CEC Medals	6 February 2023	Best Supporting Actress	Luisa Merelas	Nominated	
CEC Medals	6 February 2023	Best Original Screenplay	Isabel Peña, Rodrigo Sorogoyen	Won	
CEC Medals	6 February 2023	Best Cinematography	Alex de Pablo	Won	
CEC Medals	6 February 2023	Best Editing	Alberto del Campo	Won	
CEC Medals	6 February 2023	Best Music	Oliver Arson	Won	
Goya Awards	11 February 2023	Best Film	The Beasts	Won	
Goya Awards	11 February 2023	Best Director	Rodrigo Sorogoyen	Won	
Goya Awards	11 February 2023	Best Original Screenplay	Isabel Peña, Rodrigo Sorogoyen	Won	
Goya Awards	11 February 2023	Best Actor	Denis Ménochet	Won	
Goya Awards	11 February 2023	Best Actress	Marina Foïs	Nominated	
Goya Awards	11 February 2023	Best Supporting Actor	Diego Anido	Nominated	
Goya Awards	11 February 2023	Best Supporting Actor	Luis Zahera	Won	
Goya Awards	11 February 2023	Best Supporting Actress	Marie Colomb	Nominated	
Goya Awards	11 February 2023	Best Cinematography	Álex de Pablo	Won	
Goya Awards	11 February 2023	Best Editing	Alberto del Campo	Won	
Goya Awards	11 February 2023	Best Original Score	Olivier Arson	Won	
Goya Awards	11 February 2023	Best Sound	Aitor Berenguer, Fabiola Ordoyo, Yasmina Praderas	Won	
Goya Awards	11 February 2023	Best Art Direction	José Tirado	Nominated	
Goya Awards	11 February 2023	Best Costume Design	Paola Torres	Nominated	
Goya Awards	11 February 2023	Best Makeup and Hairstyles	Irene Pedrosa, Jesús Gil	Nominated	
Goya Awards	11 February 2023	Best Special Effects	Óscar Abades, Ana Rubio	Nominated	
Goya Awards	11 February 2023	Best Production Supervision	Carmen Sánchez de la Vega	Nominated	
César Awards	24 February 2023	Best Foreign Film	The Beasts	Won	
Actors and Actresses Union Awards	13 March 2023	Best Film Actor in a Leading Role	Denis Ménochet	Won	
Actors and Actresses Union Awards	13 March 2023	Best Film Actress in a Leading Role	Marina Foïs	Nominated	
Actors and Actresses Union Awards	13 March 2023	Best Film Actor in a Secondary Role	Luis Zahera	Won	
Actors and Actresses Union Awards	13 March 2023	Best Film Actress in a Minor Role	Marie Colomb	Nominated	
Actors and Actresses Union Awards	13 March 2023	Best New Actor	Diego Anido	Won	
Platino Awards	22 April 2023	Best Ibero-American Film	The Beasts	Nominated	
Platino Awards	22 April 2023	Best Director	Rodrigo Sorogoyen	Won	
Platino Awards	22 April 2023	Best Screenplay	Isabel Peña, Rodrigo Sorogoyen	Nominated	
Platino Awards	22 April 2023	Best Supporting Actor	Luis Zahera	Won	
Platino Awards	22 April 2023	Best Film Editing	Alberto del Campo	Won	
Platino Awards	22 April 2023	Best Sound	Aitor Berenguer, Fabiola Ordoyo, Yasmina Praderas	Won	
Grande Prêmio do Cinema Brasileiro	23 August 2023	Best Ibero-American Film	The Beasts	Nominated	
Ariel Awards	9 September 2023	Best Ibero-American Film	The Beasts	Nominated	
Rolling Stone en Español Awards	26 October 2023	Fiction Feature Film of the Year	The Beasts	Won	
Rolling Stone en Español Awards	26 October 2023	Direction of the Year	Rodrigo Sorogoyen	Nominated	
Rolling Stone en Español Awards	26 October 2023	Performance of the Year	Marina Foïs	Nominated	
Macondo Awards	5 November 2023	Best Ibero-American Film	The Beasts	Nominated	
David di Donatello	3 May 2024	Best International Film	The Beasts	Nominated	

== See also ==
- List of Spanish films of 2022
- List of French films of 2022
- Santoalla
