= Elena López Riera =

Spanish filmmaker and academic (born 1982)

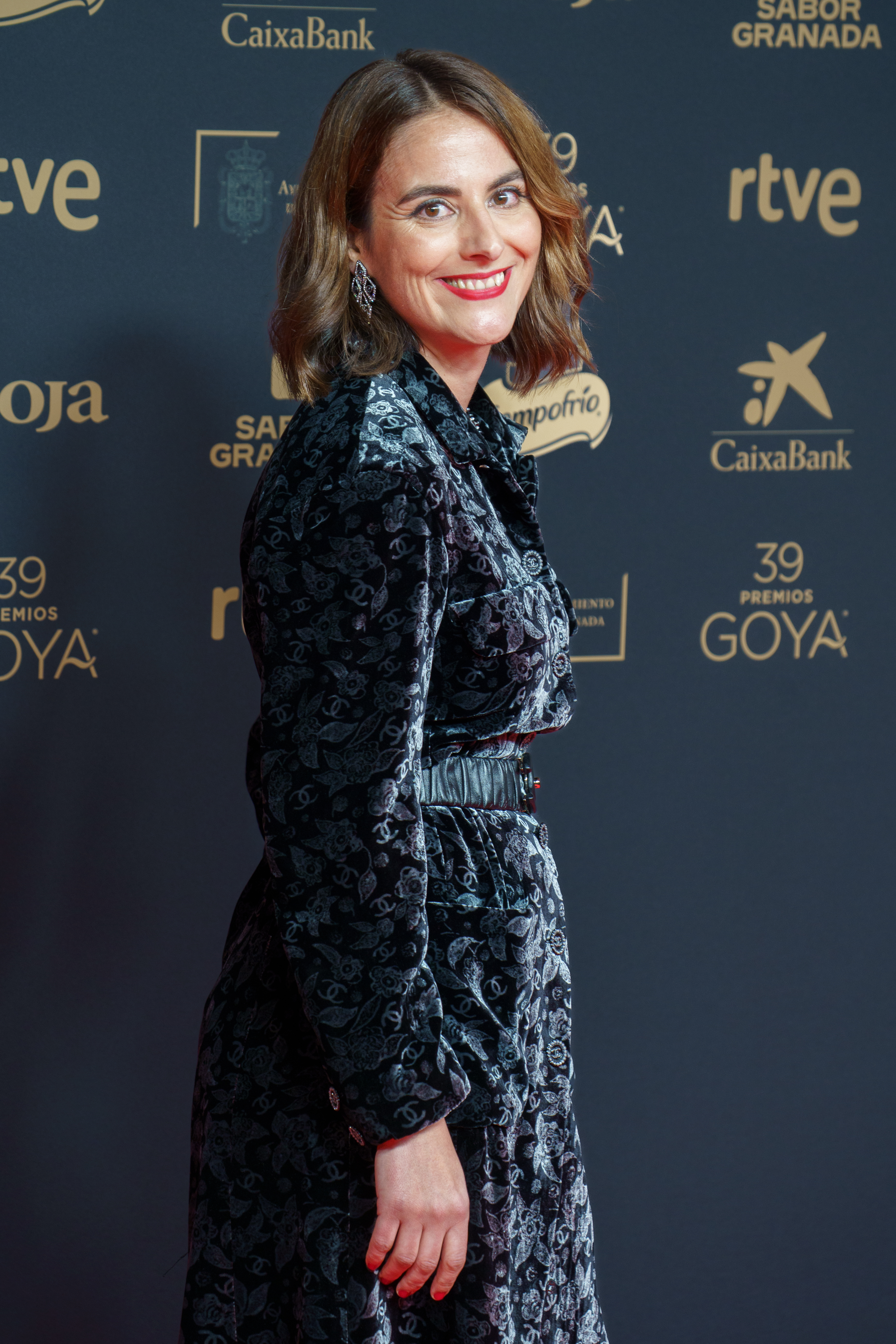
- Riera on the red carpet at the 2025 Goya Awards
- Born: Elena López Riera; 1982 (age 43–44); Orihuela, Alicante, Spain
- Education: PhD in Audiovisual Communication, University of Valencia
- Occupations: Film director; screenwriter; film programmer; academic
- Years active: 2015–present
- Website: elenalopezriera.com

Elena López Riera (born 1982) is a Spanish film director, screenwriter, film programmer and academic. Based in Geneva and Paris, she is known for her work exploring oral tradition, female narratives and the mythology of her native Vega Baja del Segura region in southeastern Spain. Her films blend documentary and fiction, and are consistently set in her hometown of Orihuela.

López Riera's short film Pueblo (2015) premiered at the Directors' Fortnight of the Cannes Film Festival, and her subsequent short Los que desean (Those Who Desire, 2018) won the Pardino d'Oro at the Locarno Film Festival and was nominated for the European Film Awards. Her debut feature film El agua (The Water, 2022) premiered at the Directors' Fortnight at Cannes and was nominated for the Goya Award for Best New Director. Her documentary short Las novias del sur (Southern Brides, 2024) won the Queer Palm at the 2024 Cannes Film Festival and the César Award for Best Documentary Short Film in 2025.

== Early life and education ==
López Riera was born in 1982 in Orihuela, a city in the Vega Baja del Segura region of Alicante, southeastern Spain. She grew up surrounded by women — her mother, aunts, grandmothers and neighbours — who passed down oral stories mixing real events with local legends and folklore, an experience she has cited as a fundamental influence on her filmmaking. At the age of five, she experienced a devastating flood of the Segura River, an event that deeply marked her childhood and would later become a central theme in her work.

She studied Audiovisual Communication at the University of Valencia and later completed a doctoral thesis on contemporary Argentine cinema at the same university, earning a PhD in Audiovisual Communication. In 2008, she moved to Switzerland, where she began teaching at the University of Geneva.

== Academic and programming career ==
López Riera has combined her filmmaking with an academic career. She has taught comparative literature and film at several institutions, including the University of Geneva, Charles III University of Madrid and the University of Valencia. Since 2019, she has taught at the HEAD (Haute école d'art et de design) in Geneva and at the Elías Querejeta Zine Eskola in San Sebastián.

As a film programmer, López Riera has been a member of the selection committee of the Festival Entrevues de Belfort since 2015, and of the Visions du Réel festival in Nyon since 2017. She has also worked as a collaborator and consultant at the Seville European Film Festival. In 2009, she co-founded the audiovisual experimentation collective lacasinegra.

== Filmmaking career ==
=== Short films (2015–2018) ===
López Riera's debut short film, Pueblo (2015), premiered at the Directors' Fortnight of the 2015 Cannes Film Festival and was subsequently selected for over twenty international festivals. The following year, her short Las vísceras (The Entrails, 2016) screened in competition at the Locarno Film Festival in the Pardi di domani section and won the Silver Mikeldi Award at the Zinebi International Festival in Bilbao.

Her third short, Los que desean (Those Who Desire, 2018), about painted pigeons symbolising masculine desire, won the Pardino d'Oro for Best International Short Film at the Locarno Film Festival, the Grand Prize at the Zinebi Festival in Bilbao, a special mention in the Zabaltegi-Tabakalera section of the San Sebastián International Film Festival, and the Grand Prize at the Vila do Conde Film Festival. The film was also nominated for the European Film Award for Best Short Film and was exhibited as a video installation at MoMA PS1 in New York as part of the Openhouse spring exhibition.

=== El agua (2022) ===
López Riera's debut feature film, El agua (The Water), premiered on 20 May 2022 at the Directors' Fortnight of the 2022 Cannes Film Festival. The film had been developed through the Cinéfondation residency programme at the Cannes Film Festival, where it won the Best Project pitching prize from the CNC.

Set during a sweltering summer in a small village in southeastern Spain, the film revolves around a local legend that claims some women are predestined to disappear with each flood because they carry "the water inside them". The story follows 17-year-old Ana (Luna Pamies) as she falls in love with José (Alberto Olmo) while living with her mother (Bárbara Lennie) and grandmother (Nieve de Medina). The film was a co-production between Swiss company Alina Film, Spanish company Suica Films and French company Les Films du Worso.

Following its Cannes premiere, El agua was selected for the Toronto International Film Festival, the Zabaltegi-Tabakalera section of the San Sebastián International Film Festival, and numerous other festivals including Zurich, Melbourne and São Paulo. It was also screened at the Museum of Modern Art (MoMA) in New York in 2023.

At the 37th Goya Awards ceremony, held on 11 February 2023 in Seville, the film received two nominations: Best New Director for López Riera and Best New Actress for Luna Pamiés.

=== Las novias del sur (2024) ===
López Riera's documentary short film Las novias del sur (Southern Brides, 2024) had its world premiere at the Critics' Week section of the 2024 Cannes Film Festival on 19 May 2024, where it was awarded the Queer Palm. The film is an intimate portrait in which women of various generations reflect on desire, marriage and sexuality, while the director questions her own absence of marriage and motherhood, and the extinction of a chain of mother–daughter relationships.

The film subsequently screened at the Zabaltegi-Tabakalera section of the San Sebastián International Film Festival 2024, the Curtocircuito Festival in Santiago de Compostela — where it won both the Best Spanish Film Award and the Audience Award — and at international festivals including Curtas Vila do Conde in Portugal and Cinespaña in Toulouse.

Las novias del sur was produced by the Valencian company Suica Films and the Swiss company Alina Film, with support from the Institut Valencià de Cultura and À Punt Mèdia. The film was nominated for the Goya Award for Best Documentary Short Film at the 39th Goya Awards in February 2025, though it did not win. On 28 February 2025, it won the César Award for Best Documentary Short Film at the 50th César Award ceremony held at the Olympia in Paris, making it the first Valencian production to win a César.

== Artistic themes ==
All of López Riera's films are set in Orihuela and the surrounding Vega Baja del Segura region of southeastern Spain. Her work consistently explores the relationship between women and the landscape, oral tradition, local legends and the mythology surrounding the floods of the Segura River. Her films blur the boundaries between documentary and fiction, frequently incorporating testimonies from local women alongside scripted narratives.

López Riera has described her approach to cinema as deeply informed by the storytelling traditions of the women she grew up with, noting that they made no distinction between history and poetry in their narratives. Her work has been exhibited in art institutions including MoMA PS1, the Cinémathèque Française and the Cinemateca de Bogotá.

== Filmography ==
=== Feature films ===
Year	Title	English title	Notes
2022	El agua	The Water	Directors' Fortnight, Cannes 2022

=== Short films ===
Year	Title	English title	Notes
2014	Pas à Genève		
2015	Pueblo	Village	Directors' Fortnight, Cannes 2015
2016	Las vísceras	The Entrails	Locarno Film Festival 2016
2018	Los que desean	Those Who Desire	Pardino d'Oro, Locarno 2018
2024	Las novias del sur	Southern Brides	Queer Palm, Cannes 2024; César Award 2025

== Awards and nominations ==
Year	Award	Category	Work	Result	Ref.
2016	Zinebi International Festival	Silver Mikeldi (Documentary)	Las vísceras	Won	
2018	Locarno Film Festival	Pardino d'Oro (Best International Short Film)	Los que desean	Won	
2018	San Sebastián International Film Festival	Special Mention, Zabaltegi-Tabakalera	Los que desean	Won	
2018	Zinebi International Festival	Grand Prize	Los que desean	Won	
2018	European Film Awards	Best Short Film	Los que desean	Nominated	
2021	Screen International	Spain Stars of Tomorrow		Won	
2023	37th Goya Awards	Best New Director	El agua	Nominated	
2024	2024 Cannes Film Festival	Queer Palm (Short Film)	Las novias del sur	Won	
2024	Curtocircuito Festival	Best Spanish Film	Las novias del sur	Won	
2024	Curtocircuito Festival	Audience Award	Las novias del sur	Won	
2025	39th Goya Awards	Best Documentary Short Film	Las novias del sur	Nominated	
2025	50th César Awards	Best Documentary Short Film	Las novias del sur	Won	
