= Enemies (2025 film) =

- Film poster
- Spanish: Enemigos
- Directed by: David Valero
- Screenplay by: Alfonso Amador; David Valero
- Produced by: José Antonio Félez; Alberto Félez
- Starring: Christian Checa; Hugo Welzel; Estefanía de los Santos; Luna Pamies; Sara Vidorreta; José María Peinado; José Manuel Poga
- Cinematography: Alberto Pareja
- Edited by: José M. G. Moyano
- Music by: Steve Lean
- Production companies: Amazon MGM Studios; Atípica Films
- Distributed by: Vértice 360 (es)
- Release dates: 15 March 2025 (Málaga); 9 May 2025 (Spain)
- Running time: 103 minutes
- Countries: United States; Spain
- Language: Spanish

Enemies (Spanish: Enemigos) is a 2025 thriller drama film directed by David Valero. It stars Christian Checa and Hugo Welzel.

== Plot ==
The plot follows long enemies Rubio and Chimo, respectively bully and bullied. As Chimo has a chance for revenge, the lives of both are upended.

== Cast ==
- Christian Checa as Chimo
- Hugo Welzel as Rubio
- Estefanía de los Santos as Carmen
- Luna Pamies as Lola
- Sara Vidorreta
- José María Peinado
- José Manuel Poga

== Production ==
The screenplay was written by David Valero alongside Alfonso Amador. The film is an Amazon MGM Studios and Atípica Films production. Principal photography began on 11 September 2023 in Alicante.

== Release ==
Enemies was presented in March 2025 at the 28th Málaga Film Festival in a non-competitive official section slot. Distributed by Vértice 360, the film is scheduled to be released theatrically in Spain on 9 May 2025. It will be made available later on Amazon Prime Video.

== Reception ==
Enid Román Almansa of Cinemanía rated the film 5 out of 5 stars, assessing that Valero achieves his purpose with "an impeccable cast and a masterful Christian Checa and Hugo Welzel".

Raquel Hernández Luján of HobbyConsolas gave the film 85 points ('very good'), writing that "everything flows smoothly and is at the service of an unconventional story in which positive values triumph".

John Serba of Decider.com gave a positive recommendation,declaring the film a "thoughtful, reasonably authentic and intelligent drama about how difficult it can be to take the moral high ground".

== Accolades ==
Year	Award	Category	Nominee(s)	Result	Ref.
2025	8th Lola Gaos Awards	Best Director	David Valero	Nominated	
2025	8th Lola Gaos Awards	Best Supporting Actress	Luna Pamies	Nominated	
2025	8th Lola Gaos Awards	Best Screenplay	Alfonso Amador, David Valero	Nominated	
2025	8th Lola Gaos Awards	Best Art Direction	Carlos Ramón Almenar	Nominated	
2025	31st Forqué Awards	Cinema and Education in Values		Nominated	
2026	5th Carmen Awards	Best Non-Andalusian Produced Film		Nominated	
2026	5th Carmen Awards	Best Supporting Actor	José Manuel Poga	Nominated	
2026	5th Carmen Awards	Best Supporting Actress	Estefanía de los Santos	Nominated	
2026	5th Carmen Awards	Best New Actor	Hugo Welzel	Won	
2026	5th Carmen Awards	Best Cinematography	Alberto Pareja	Nominated	
2026	5th Carmen Awards	Best Production Supervision	Bea Rodríguez Vives	Nominated	
2026	5th Carmen Awards	Best Special Effects	Juanma Nogales	Won	
2026	40th Goya Awards	Best New Actor	Hugo Welzel	Nominated	
2026	40th Goya Awards	Best Special Effects	César Moreno, Ana Rubio, Juanma Nogales	Nominated	
2026	34th Actors and Actresses Union Awards	Best New Actor	Hugo Welzel	Nominated	

== See also ==
- List of Spanish films of 2025
