= Last Stop: Rocafort St. =

- Film poster
- Spanish: Estación Rocafort
- Directed by: Luis Prieto
- Screenplay by: Iván Ledesma; Ángel Agudo; Luis Prieto
- Produced by: Adrián Guerra; Núria Valls; Julieta Videla; Vicente Canales
- Starring: Natalia Azahara; Javier Gutiérrez; Valèria Sorolla
- Cinematography: Marc Miró
- Edited by: Federico Conforti (lead editor) Beatriz Colomar (additional editor)
- Music by: Nami Melumad
- Production companies: Showrunner Films; Nostromo Pictures; Estación Rocafort Película AIE
- Distributed by: Filmax
- Release date: 6 September 2024
- Country: Spain
- Language: Spanish

Last Stop: Rocafort St. (Spanish: Estación Rocafort) is a 2024 Spanish horror thriller film directed by Luis Prieto starring Natalia Azahara alongside Javier Gutiérrez and Valèria Sorolla.

== Plot ==
After landing a night shift job in the Barcelona Metro and starting a relationship with co-worker Cris, Laura discovers the many strange deaths happening at the station she works for, Rocafort station, teaming up with troubled former cop Román in her search for truth.

== Cast ==
- Natalia Azahara as Laura
- Javier Gutiérrez as Román
- Albert Baró as Román (young)
- Valèria Sorolla as Cris
- Xavi Sáez as Andrés
- Francesc Albiol as Albert
- Aimar Vega as Toni
- Tatín Revenga as Luis
- Celso Bugallo as Elías

== Production ==
The screenplay was written by Iván Ledesma, Ángel Agudo, and Luis Prieto. The film was produced by Showrunner Films and Nostromo Pictures and it had the participation of Netflix, Mogambo, and CreaSGR. Shooting locations included Barcelona and Las Palmas de Gran Canaria.

== Release ==
The film was released theatrically in Spain on 6 September 2024 by Filmax.

== Reception ==
Jordi Batlle Caminal of Fotogramas rated the film 3 out of 5 stars, writing that it is "an uneven film, but it possesses an contagious rapture".

Toni Vall of Cinemanía rated the film 3 out of 5 stars, deeming it to be "an entertaining film", [but] "indebted to a tad too many things".

Quim Casas of El Periódico de Catalunya rated the film 2 out of 5 stars, deeming it to be "a film that is interesting in its approach, but limited in its results".

Ekaitz Ortega of HobbyConsolas gave the film 56 points ('so-so'), positively mentioning Azahara and Sorolla's performances as well as some punctual horror scenes, while negatively citing a number of clichés and that the plot displays "significant pacing problems".

== See also ==
- List of Spanish films of 2024
