= The Rite of Spring (film) =

- Theatrical release poster by Mica Murphy
- Spanish: La consagración de la primavera
- Directed by: Fernando Franco
- Written by: Fernando Franco; Begoña Arostegui
- Produced by: Jaime Ortiz de Artiñano; Fernando Franco; Koldo Zuazua; Gonzalo Salázar-Simpson
- Starring: Valèria Sorolla; Telmo Irureta; Emma Suárez
- Cinematography: Santiago Racaj
- Edited by: Miguel Doblado
- Production companies: Lazona; Kowalski Films; Ferdydurke Films; Blizzard Films
- Distributed by: La Aventura
- Release dates: 21 September 2022 (Zinemaldia); 30 September 2022 (Spain)
- Country: Spain
- Language: Spanish

The Rite of Spring (Spanish: La consagración de la primavera) is a 2022 Spanish drama film with comedy elements directed by Fernando Franco which stars Valèria Sorolla, Telmo Irureta, and Emma Suárez.

== Plot ==
Delving into the topic of sexual repression (and awakening), the plot tracks Laura, a young woman from a conservative background moving to a colegio mayor in Madrid to study a degree in Chemistry. She meets David, a boy with cerebral palsy living with his mother Isabel. Laura establishes a friendly relationship with Isabel and David and accepts to masturbate David in their home in exchange for money.

== Cast ==
- Valèria Sorolla as Laura
- Telmo Irureta as David
- Emma Suárez as Isabel

== Production ==
The screenplay was penned by Franco alongside Begoña Arostegui. The Rite of Spring was produced by Lazona, Kowalski Films, Ferdydurke Films and Blizzard Films, with participation of RTVE, Canal Sur, EiTB, Movistar Plus+ and Cosmopolitan, collaboration from the Madrid regional administration, funding from ICAA and support from Agencia Andaluza de Instituciones Culturales. Shooting locations included Granada and Madrid.

== Release ==
Selected for the 70th San Sebastián International Film Festival's official selection, the film was presented on 21 September 2022. Distributed by La Aventura, it was theatrically released on 30 September 2022.

== Reception ==
Carlos Loureda of Fotogramas considered that Franco surpasses himself in "his most amiable and open film" in what seemed unbeatable so far: the direction of actresses. Also reviewing for Fotogramas, Pablo Vázquez scored 5 out of 5 stars, describing the film as "a beautiful act of artistic terrorism, as virtuous and warm as it is absurdly human".

Jonathan Holland of ScreenDaily deemed the film to be "daring", "undoubtedly crafted with care" and "Franco's most accessible work to date", while pointing out at the script's lack of "imaginative power", being "far more interested in presenting interactions in exquisite detail than it is in putting flesh on the characters involved".

Javier Ocaña of Cinemanía rated the film 4 out of 5 stars considering that newcomers Sorolla and Irureta manage to move viewers with their frank performances.

Manuel J. Lombardo of Diario de Sevilla rated the film 4 out of 5 stars, deeming it to be a "film full of nuances" that "breathes truth and exhales emotions as sober as they are authentic".

=== Top ten lists ===
The film appeared on a number of critics' top ten lists of the best Spanish films of 2022:

- 2nd — El Cultural (Carlos Heredero)
- 4th — El Cultural (Carlos Reviriego)
- 6th — Cadena SER (Pepa Blanes)
- 6th — El Cultural (Javier Yuste)
- 6th — Cadena SER (Jose M. Romero)
- 8th — El Mundo (Luis Martínez)
- 9th — Cadena SER ('El cine en la SER' critics)
- 10th — El Cultural (Mariona Burrull)
- 10th — El Confidencial (Marta Medina)

== Accolades ==
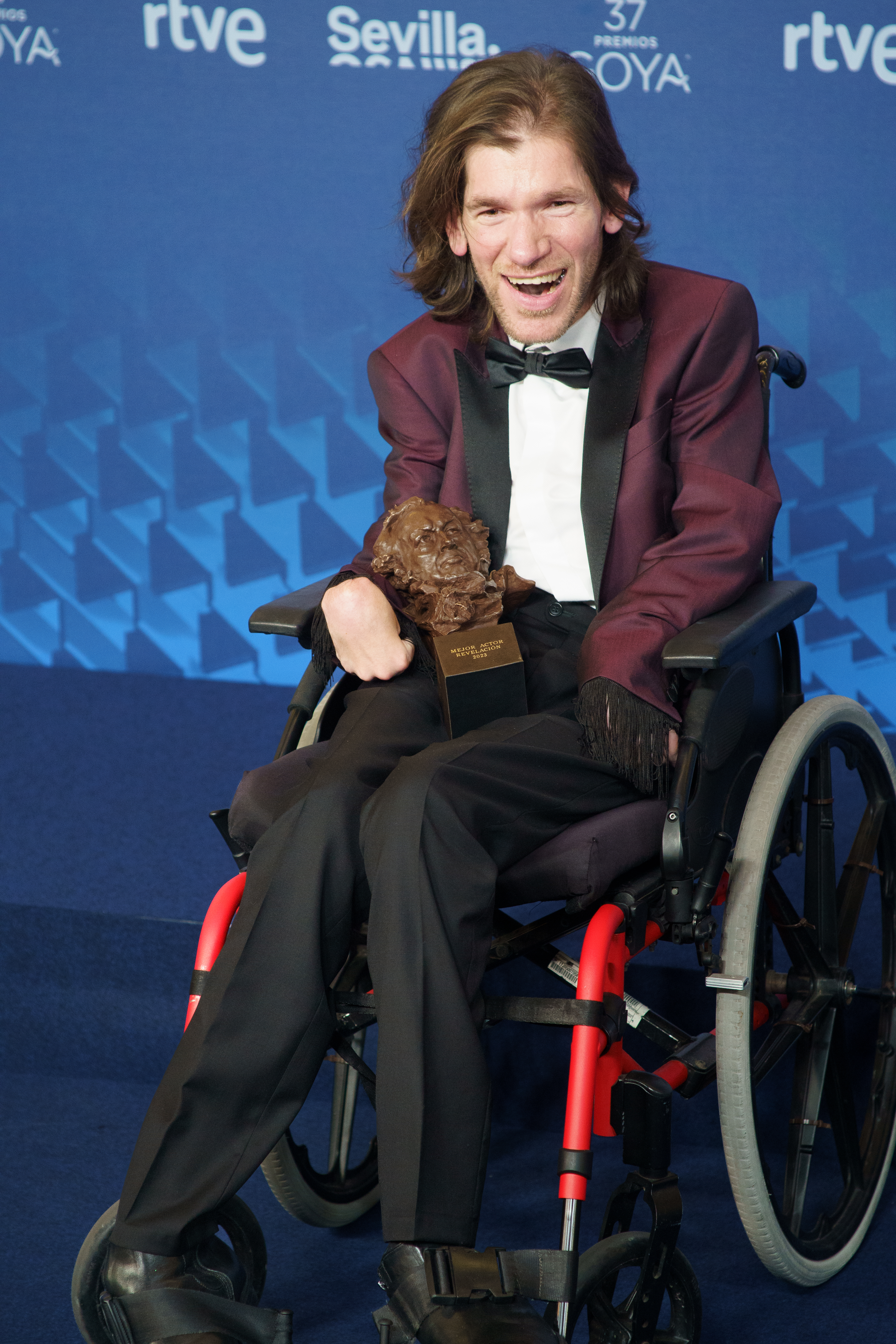
Telmo Irureta with his Goya Award for Best New Actor in 2023

Year	Award	Category	Nominee(s)	Result	Ref.
2022	28th Forqué Awards	Cinema and Education in Values		Nominated	
2023	10th Feroz Awards	Best Supporting Actress in a Film	Emma Suárez	Nominated	
2023	10th Feroz Awards	Best Film Poster	Mica Murphy	Nominated	
2023	2nd Carmen Awards	Best Film		Nominated	
2023	2nd Carmen Awards	Best Director	Fernando Franco	Nominated	
2023	2nd Carmen Awards	Best Original Screenplay	Fernando Franco, Begoña Arostegui	Nominated	
2023	2nd Carmen Awards	Best Costume Design	Esther Vaquero	Nominated	
2023	2nd Carmen Awards	Best Sound	Dani de Zayas	Nominated	
2023	2nd Carmen Awards	Best Makeup and Hairstyles	María Liaño, Rafael Mora	Nominated	
2023	37th Goya Awards	Best New Actress	Valèria Sorolla	Nominated	
2023	37th Goya Awards	Best New Actor	Telmo Irureta	Won	
2023	31st Actors and Actresses Union Awards	Best Film Actress in a Minor Role	Emma Suárez	Nominated	

== See also ==
- List of Spanish films of 2022
