= The Water (2022 film) =

- Promotional release poster
- Spanish: El agua
- Directed by: Elena López Riera
- Written by: Elena López Riera; Philippe Azoury
- Starring: Luna Pamies; Bárbara Lennie; Nieve de Medina
- Cinematography: Giuseppe Truppi
- Edited by: Raphaël Lefèvre
- Music by: Mandine Knoepfel
- Production companies: Alina Film; Suica Films; Les Films du Worso
- Distributed by: Elastica (es)
- Release dates: 20 May 2022 (Cannes); 4 November 2022 (Spain)
- Countries: Switzerland; Spain; France
- Language: Spanish

The Water (Spanish: El agua) is a 2022 magic realism drama film co-written and directed by Elena López Riera in her directorial debut feature which stars Luna Pamies, Bárbara Lennie and Nieve de Medina. It is a joint Swiss-Spanish-French production.

== Plot ==
Set in southeastern Spain, with the backdrop of a local superstition concerning women being predestined to drown in river floods, the plot follows Ana, who lives with her mother and her grandmother, while the storm is coming.

== Cast ==
- Luna Pamies as Ana
- Bárbara Lennie as Isabella
- Nieve de Medina as Ángela
- Alberto Olmo as José
- Pascual Valero
- Philippe Azoury

== Production ==
The screenplay was written by Elena López Riera alongside Philippe Azoury. A Swiss-Spanish-French co-production, the film was produced by Alina Film, Suica Films and Les Films du Worso with support from Institut Valencià de Cultura, ICAA, Creative Europe's MEDIA, and participation of RTVE and À Punt Mèdia. Shooting took place in Orihuela and other locations across the province of Alicante from April to May 2021. Giuseppe Truppi took over the cinematography whereas Raphaël Lefèvre did so with the film editing.

== Release ==
The film had its world premiere on 20 May 2022 at the Directors' Fortnight parallel section of the 75th Cannes Film Festival. For its North-American premiere, it made it to the 'Contemporary World Cinema' strand of the 2022 Toronto International Film Festival.

Filmin and Elastica scooped the distribution rights for Spain, where the film was scheduled to be theatrically released on 28 October 2022. It eventually opened in Spanish theatres on 4 November 2022.

== Reception ==
On the American review aggregation website Rotten Tomatoes, The Water has a 100% approval rating based on 15 reviews from critics, with an average rating of 7.7/10.

Jonathan Holland of ScreenDaily deemed the film to be a "daring, multi-layered debut feature", also writing that "[The Water is] a film which always feels carefully poised on the edge of the surreal, where dark things always seem to be pressing in".

Manu Yáñez of Fotogramas rated the film 4 out of 5 stars, extolling the "audacity" of Elena López Riera at handling and intermingling the elements of the film.

Elsa Fernández-Santos of El País deemed the "suggestive" debut feature to be "a film where the arcane becomes visible in a subtle and interior way".

=== Top ten lists ===
The film appeared on a number of critics' top ten lists of the best Spanish films of 2022:

- 3rd — El Mundo (Luis Martínez)
- 3rd — El Cultural (Begoña Donat)
- 6th — El Periódico de Catalunya (critics)
- 6th — El Confidencial (Marta Medina)
- 7th — El Cultural (Carlos Heredero)
- 7th — El Cultural (Javier Yuste)
- 7th — El Cultural (Juan Sardá)
- 8th — ABC (Oti Rodríguez Marchante)
- 9th — Cadena SER (Pepa Blanes)
- 10th — Cadena SER (Jose M. Romero)

== Accolades ==
Year	Award	Category	Nominee(s)	Result	Ref.
2022	27th Toulouse Spanish Film Festival	Golden Violet		Won	
2022	5th Berlanga Awards	Best Film		Nominated	
2022	5th Berlanga Awards	Best Director	Elena López Riera	Nominated	
2022	5th Berlanga Awards	Best Screenplay	Elena López Riera	Nominated	
2022	5th Berlanga Awards	Best Actress	Luna Pamies	Won	
2022	5th Berlanga Awards	Best Supporting Actress	Lidia María Cánovas	Nominated	
2022	5th Berlanga Awards	Best Supporting Actor	Pascual Valero	Won	
2022	16th Lisbon & Sintra Film Festival	Special Jury Prize (New Film)		Won	
2023	10th Feroz Awards	Arrebato Award (Fiction)		Nominated	
2023	78th CEC Medals	Best New Director	Elena López Riera	Nominated	
2023	78th CEC Medals	Best Supporting Actress	Bárbara Lennie	Nominated	
2023	37th Goya Awards	Best New Director	Elena López Riera	Nominated	
2023	37th Goya Awards	Best New Actress	Luna Pamies	Nominated	

== See also ==
- List of Spanish films of 2022
