= Diego Anido =

Spanish actor

- Anido in 2026
- Born: Diego Anido Alonso; 8 May 1976 (age 50); Santiago de Compostela, Spain
- Occupations: Actor; playwright

Diego Anido Alonso (born 8 May 1976) is a Spanish actor from Galicia. He is known for his roles in the films The Beasts (2022) and Undercover (2024).

== Life and career ==
Diego Anido Alonso was born on 8 May 1976 in Santiago de Compostela. He began his training as an actor at Espazo Aberto, developing his early career on stage. He moved to Barcelona, where he involved in the development of experimental theatre works.

Early film credits include appearances in Pedro e o Capitán (2009) and Trote (2018). In Ons (2020), he featured in a minor role portraying a deaf character. He also featured in Malencolía (2021) and O niño dos paxaros (2021), winning a Mestre Mateo Award for his supporting performance in the former film.

His breakthrough role was his portrayal of sinister and mentally-handicapped Lorenzo Anta in Rodrigo Sorogoyen's The Beasts. He was not a first choice for the character. Originally cast in a minor role, he took over the role of Lorenzo after Pedro Alonso left it vacant. His performance earned him a nomination for the Goya Award for Best Supporting Actor, lost to fellow cast member Luis Zahera. His career continued with a role in the Netflix series Gangs of Galicia, portraying a middle-rank member of the Padín drug-trafficking clan.

He played the ETA member Sergio Polo in the thriller Undercover (2024).

== Accolades ==
Year	Award	Category	Work	Result	Ref.
2022	20th Mestre Mateo Awards	Best Supporting Actor	Malencolía	Won	
2023	10th Feroz Awards	Best Supporting Actor in a Film	The Beasts	Nominated	
2023	37th Goya Awards	Best Supporting Actor	The Beasts	Nominated	
2023	31st Actors and Actresses Union Awards	Best New Actor	The Beasts	Won	
2024	22nd Mestre Mateo Awards	Best Supporting Actor	The Rye Horn	Nominated	
