= Marta and Surroundings =

- Spanish: Marta y alrededores
- Directed by: Nacho Pérez de la Paz; Jesús Ruiz
- Screenplay by: Nacho Pérez de la Paz; Jesús Ruiz
- Starring: Marta Belaustegui; Tristán Ulloa; Lola Dueñas; Sergi Calleja; Roberto Enríquez; María José Millán; Nieve de Medina; Rocío Calvo; Álvaro Tobaruela
- Cinematography: Alfonso Sanz
- Edited by: Fernando Pardo
- Music by: Lucio Godoy
- Production companies: Clave Producciones; Alta Films
- Distributed by: Alta Films
- Release dates: 27 October 1999 (Seminci); 14 January 2000 (Spain)
- Running time: 107 minutes
- Country: Spain
- Language: Spanish

Marta and Surroundings (Spanish: Marta y alrededores) is a 1999 Spanish comedy-drama film written and directed by Nacho Pérez de la Paz and Jesús Ruiz. It stars Marta Belaustegui alongside Tristán Ulloa, Lola Dueñas, Sergi Calleja, Roberto Enríquez, María José Millán, Nieve de Medina, Rocío Calvo, and Álvaro Tobaruela.

== Plot ==
The plot follows the plight of a group of idle posh friends in their thirties lacking economic anxiety who meet at the home of one of them (Julio) to help him paint the house, while their petty quarrels and worries come to surface.

== Cast ==
- Marta Belaustegui as Marta
- Tristán Ulloa as Julio
- Lola Dueñas as Elisa
- Roberto Enríquez as Néstor
- María José Millán as Alicia
- Nieve de Medina as Jimena
- Sergi Calleja as Marc

== Production ==
Marta and Surroundings was produced by Clave Producciones and Alta Films. The budget was below 100 million ₧.

== Release ==
The film screened at the 44th Valladolid International Film Festival (Seminci) in October 1999. Distributed by Alta Films, it was released theatrically in Spain on 14 January 2000.

== Reception ==
Ángel Fernández-Santos of El País assessed that despite a slow start, the movie "picks up steam and, by the end, it comes to life and feels short even though it is not".

Jonathan Holland of Variety assessed that the "low-budget spectroscope of thirtysomething angst" results into "an accomplished, if unexciting, directorial debut with small but solid virtues".

== See also ==
- List of Spanish films of 2000
