= Santoalla =

2016 documentary film

- Poster
- Directed by: Andrew Becker; Daniel Mehrer
- Produced by: Christina de la Torre; Dave O'Connor; Justin Wilkes; Jeremy Cohan; Paul Mehrer; John Bertuzzi; Josh Russ Tupper
- Cinematography: Andrew Becker; Daniel Mehrer
- Edited by: Andrew Becker
- Production company: Oscilloscope Films
- Release date: June 17, 2016
- Running time: 83 minutes
- Languages: English; Galician

Santoalla is a 2016 documentary film about the deterioration in neighbor relations in a small Spanish village.

== Synopsis ==
Spanning over several decades, Santoalla tells the story of the Dutch couple Margo Pool and her husband Martin Verfondern as they settle into a village known as Santoalla (also written as Santa Eulalia) in the remote mountainous region of Galicia in northwest Spain.

The village, largely abandoned and slowly crumbling into ruins, gradually comes to be occupied by only one other family, the Rodríguez. At first amicable, tensions begin to rise between the two families as disputes over land usage, cultural differences, and misinterpreted intentions culminate into the mysterious disappearance of Martin Verfondern in 2010. Intertwined with newsreel footage, archival video montages, and interviews with Pool herself, the documentary shifts between the past and “present”, showcasing the progression in the relationship between the neighbors culminating in a tragic end.

== Production and release ==
The film was produced by Radical Media and distributed by the indie distribution company Oscilloscope. Directors Andrew Becker and Daniel Mehrer were heavily involved in the creative process while producing.

The film first premiered June 17, 2016. It was released to streaming services on July 9, 2017 and limited screenings in theatres on July 19, 2017.

In 2023, the film As Bestas, directed by Rodrigo Sorogoyen, was released as a fictionalized version of the tragic real-life story of Margo Pool, Martin Verfondern, and the small Galician village of Santoalla. Sorogoyen dedicated the film to her.

== Reception ==
Santoalla received largely positive reviews from critics. The review aggregator website Rotten Tomatoes reported an 85% approval rating with an average rating of 7.9/10 based on 100+ reviews.

Neil Young of The Hollywood Reporter described Santoalla as "A quietly absorbing true-crime tale" and wrote that "handling nearly all key creative duties between them, Becker and Mehrer have crafted a solid, even-handed survey of their chosen material, allowing viewers access to a beautiful, damply verdant, enticingly tumbledown corner of Europe." Kennet Turan of the Los Angeles Times wrote that the film is "Nominally focused on one man's mysterious disappearance, Santoalla is really concerned with cultures in collision, with what happens when dreams of paradise clash, good intentions become unhinged and the darker angels of our nature gain the upper hand." He noted that "Santoalla is a strong addition to the group" of similar documentaries.

== Awards and nominations ==
Award	Year	Category	Recipient(s) and nominee(s)	Result
Austin Film Festival	2016	Documentary Feature	Andrew Becker and Daniel Mehrer	Won
Buenos Aires International Festival of Independent Cinema	2017	Best Feature Film	Andrew Becker and Daniel Mehrer	Nominated
Cleveland International Film Festival	2017	Best Documentary	Andrew Becker and Daniel Mehrer	Nominated
Lighthouse International Film Festival	2017	Best Documentary	Andrew Becker and Danile Mehrer	Won
Minneapolis–Saint Paul International Film Festival	2017	Best Documentary	Andrew Becker and Daniel Mehrer	Nominated
Salem Film Fest, US	2017	Best Editing	Andrew Becker	Won
Cervino Cinemountain Film Festival	2017	Best Foreign Film	Andrew Becker and Daniel Mehrer	Won
Tallgrass Film Festival	2016	Outstanding Documentary Feature	Andrew Becker and Daniel Mehrer	Won
