= Valèria Sorolla =

Spanish actress

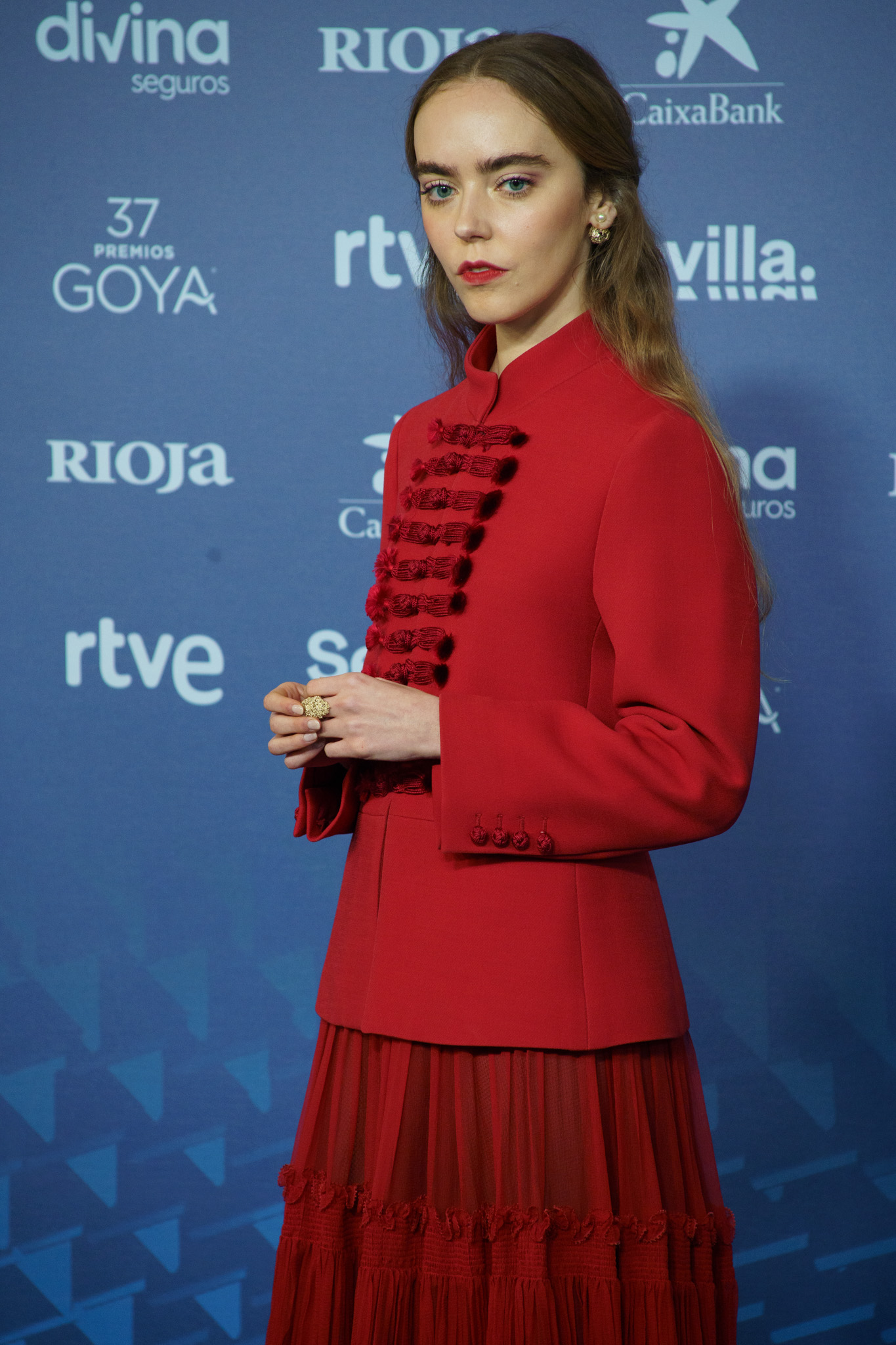
- Sorolla in 2023
- Born: 1997 (age 27–28); Barcelona, Catalonia, Spain
- Occupation: Actress

Valèria Sorolla (born 1997) is a Spanish actress from Catalonia.

== Life and career ==
Valèria Sorolla was born in Barcelona in 1997. She began her career in musical theatre, also founding the experimental arts collective Matriu ID. Early television roles include appearances in Catalan series Moebius, as well as in Paradise and Los protegidos: El regreso. She made her feature film debut in The Rite of Spring (2022), earning a nomination to the Goya Award for Best New Actress for her leading performance as Laura, a university student from out of town, lost in Madrid, stepping in to develop a physical relationship with a man with cerebral palsy. She also starred as Bel in fantasy television miniseries Mòpies, set in Mallorca. In October 2022, she began shooting Last Stop: Rocafort St., a horror film set in the Barcelona Metro.
