= Nieve de Medina =

Spanish actress and stage director

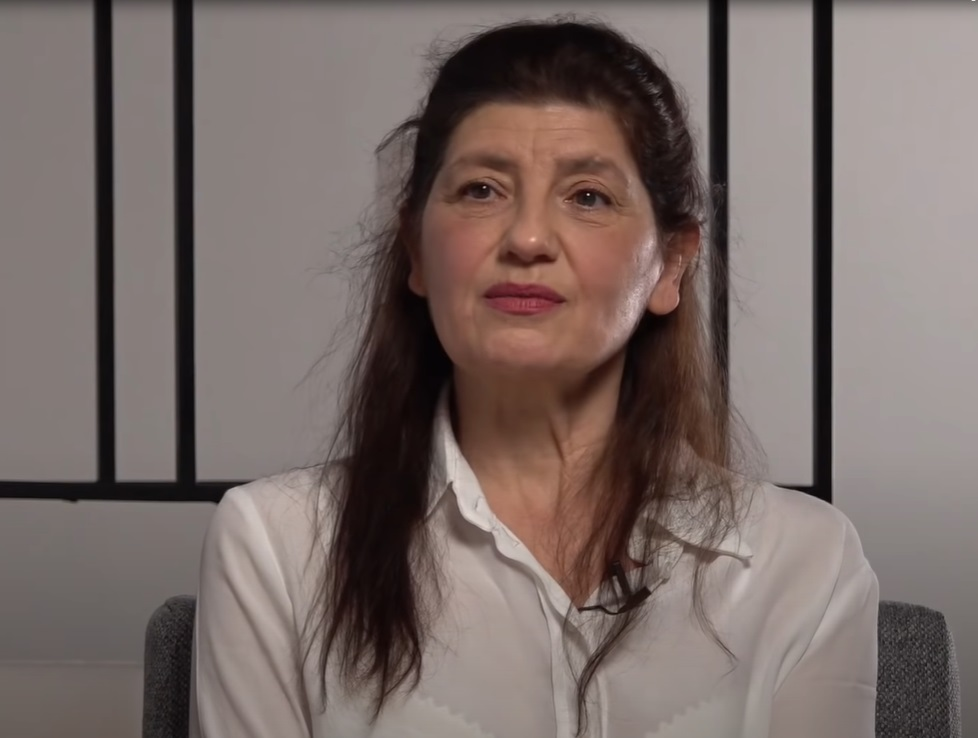
- Born: 1962 (age 63–64); Madrid, Spain
- Occupations: Actress; stage director

Nieve de Medina (born 1962) is a Spanish actress and stage director.

== Biography ==
Nieve de Medina was born in Madrid in 1962. She made her film debut as an actress with a small part in Carlos Saura's ¡Dispara! (1993). Following an appearance in Pellet (2000), her performance in the 2002 drama Mondays in the Sun, where she portrayed Ana (a worker in a production line of a cannery, married to Luis Tosar's José), made her known to the public, earning various accolades. Her television credits include performances in Cuéntame cómo pasó and El ministerio del tiempo. She also works as stage director at the RESAD.

== Filmography ==
=== Film ===
Year	Title	Role	Notes	Ref.
1993	¡Dispara!			
1999	Marta y alrededores (Marta and Surroundings)	Jimena		
2000	El Bola (Pellet)	Marisa, madre de Alfredo		
2002	Los lunes al sol (Mondays in the Sun)	Ana		
2006	Un franco, 14 pesetas (Crossing the Border)	Pilar		
2014	2 francos, 40 pesetas	Pilar	Reprise of her role in Un franco, 14 pesetas	
2016	La punta del iceberg (The Tip of the Iceberg)	Susana		
2016	La madre	María		
2022	El agua (The Water)	Ángela		

=== Television ===
Year	Title	Role	Notes	Ref.
2003	Una nueva vida	Laura		
2016	El ministerio del tiempo	Marisa		
2019	Brigada Costa del Sol	Gloria		

== Accolades ==
Year	Award	Category	Work	Result	Ref.
2003	58th CEC Medals	Best Supporting Actress	Mondays in the Sun	Won	
2003	17th Goya Awards	Best New Actress	Mondays in the Sun	Nominated	
2003	12th Actors and Actresses Union Awards	Best Film Actress in a Secondary Role	Mondays in the Sun	Won	
2003	12th Actors and Actresses Union Awards	Best New Actress	Mondays in the Sun	Won	
2003	16th European Film Awards	People's Choice Award for Best Actress	Mondays in the Sun	Nominated	
2007	6th Mestre Mateo Awards	Best Actress	Crossing the Border	Nominated	
