= Rueda =

Rueda may refer to:

== Places ==
- Las Ruedas de Ocón or just Las Ruedas, a village in the municipality of Ocón, in the province and autonomous community of La Rioja, Spain
- Rueda Abbey or Rueda de Ebro Abbey, a former Cistercian monastery in Sástago, Zaragoza, Spain
- Rueda de Jalón, a municipality located in the province of Zaragoza, Aragon, Spain
- Rueda de la Sierra, a municipality located in the province of Guadalajara, Castile-La Mancha, Spain
- Rueda (DO), the Spanish wine producing-region in the province of Valladolid
- Plaza Rueda, a public square in Ermita, Manila, Philippines
- Rueda, Valladolid, a municipality in Valladolid province in the autonomous community of Castile-León, Spain

== Dance ==
- Rueda de Casino, a round dance variant of salsa
- Swing rueda, a swing dance

== People ==
- Rueda (surname)

== See also ==
- Battle of Rueda, a battle in 981 AD during the Spanish Reconquista
- Ruedas, a Philippine Spanish surname literally meaning "wheels". (see Philippine name)
