= Rillo de Gallo =

Rillo de Gallo, Spain
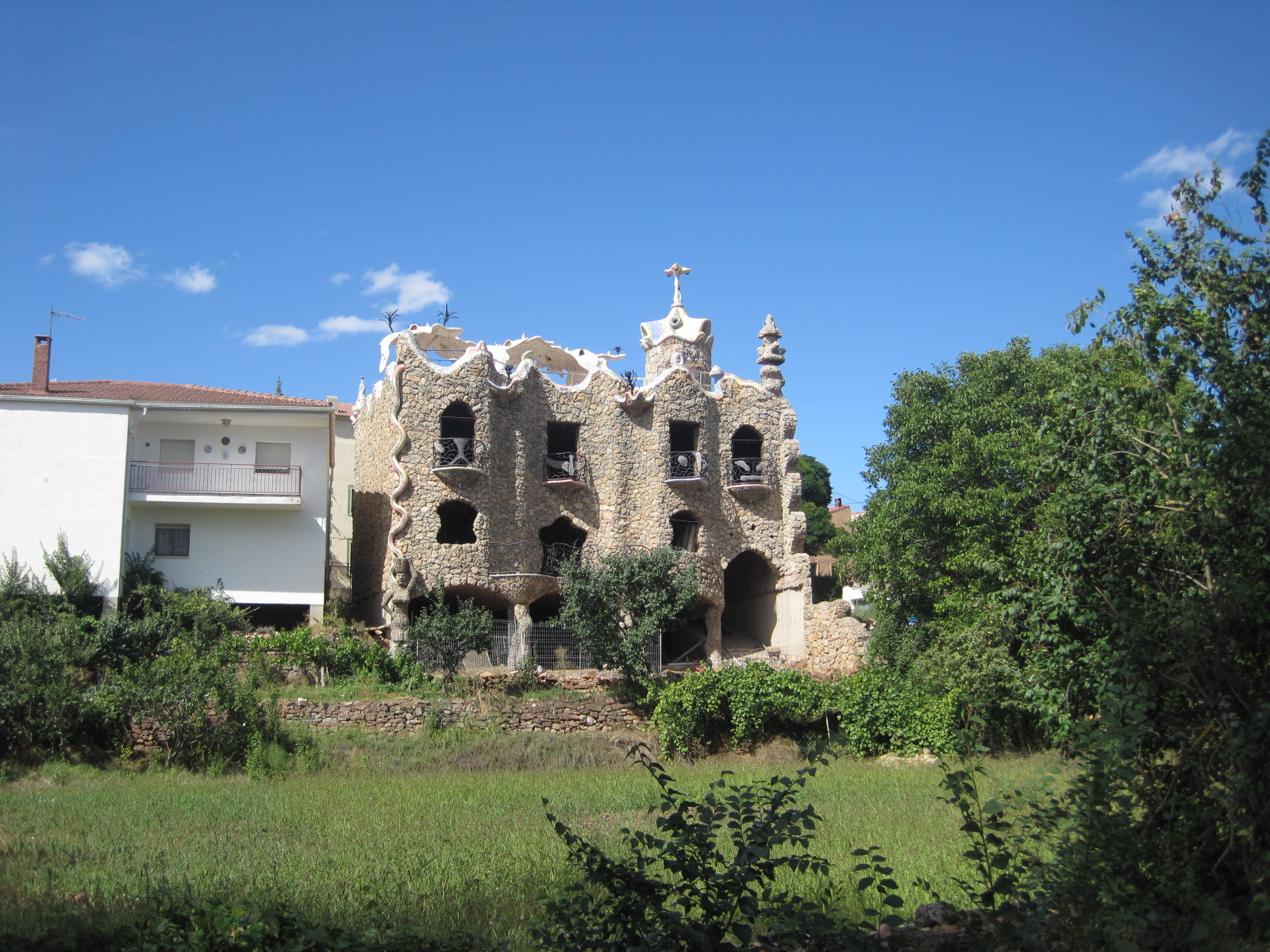

- Coat of arms

- Location within Province of Guadalajara Location within Castilla-La Mancha Location within Spain
- Country: Spain
- Autonomous community: Castile-La Mancha
- Province: Guadalajara
- Municipality: Rillo de Gallo

Area
  - Total: 25 km^{2} (9.7 sq mi)

Population (2025-01-01)
  - Total: 37
  - Density: 1.5/km^{2} (3.8/sq mi)
- Time zone: UTC+1 (CET)
  - Summer (DST): UTC+2 (CEST)

Rillo de Gallo is a municipality located in the province of Guadalajara, Castile-La Mancha, Spain. According to the 2004 census (INE), the municipality has a population of 74 inhabitants.

== Symbols ==
The heraldic shield of Rillo de Gallo was approved by Decree 138/87 of the Community of Castilla-La Mancha on the 27th of October. The shield is split into three parts. The first of three main symbols is a golden rooster is on an azure background on the top left of the shield. A simple elm tree is displayed on the top right with a greyish background. A silver axe is the third of the three symbols, shown at the bottom with an azure background.

== Geography ==
The town of Rillo de Gallo is located at an altitude of 1,055 meters above sea level, with its highest altitude located at Loma de Matillas (1,404 meters).

The municipality of Rillo de Gallo is bordered on the north by Pardos and Torrubia, on the south by Corduente, on the east by Rueda de la Sierra and Molina de Aragón, and on the west by Herrería.

The Gallo river, which gives the town its name, is far from the urban area, although it irrigates its lands. The Viejo River, the Herrería River, and the Arroyo Seco River pass through the area.

== Geology ==
In the region of Rillo de Gallo, there are important geological and geomorphological riches that have led to a proposal to make it a geosite of international interest.

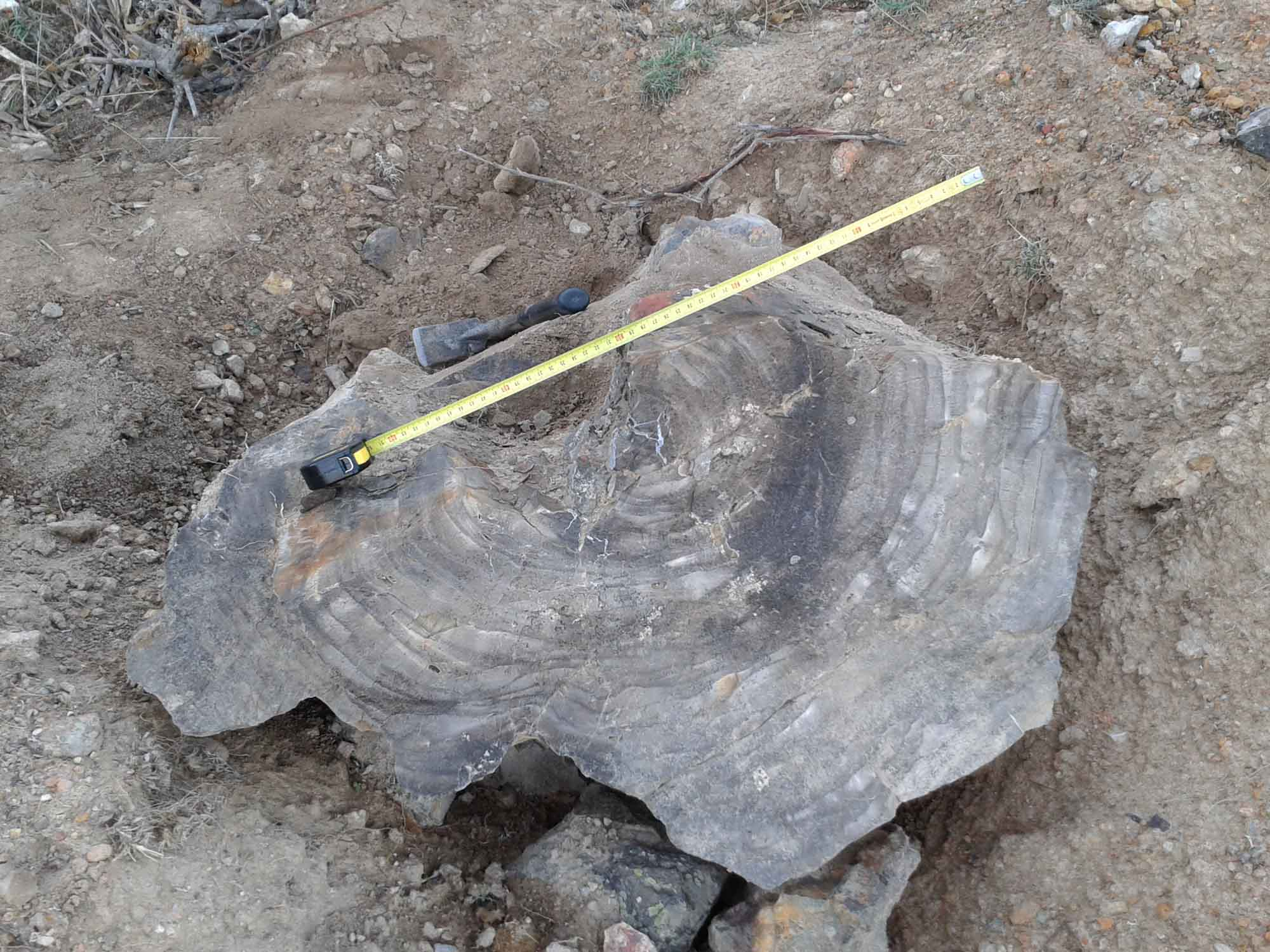
Petrified tree trunk that surfaced at the time of the reforestation of the pine forest

Numerous geologic formations containing Permian and Triassic fossils from Western Europe are notable for their well-preserved Middle Triassic macroflora, pollen, marine vertebrate ichnites, and fauna content. In addition, it was also established that the region contains the only continuous stratigraphic column in the Iberian Peninsula from the Permian and Triassic periods. There are detrital formations from the Lower Triassic and Middle Triassic periods resulting from a large fluvial system of low sinuosity and the transport of sediments, gravels, or sands.

The road from Rillo de Gallo to Pardos, along the ravine of the Hoz del Río Gallo (Corduente), is suggested as a “Global Geosite” (Spanish Place of Geological Interest of International Importance) by the Instituto Geológico y Minero de España for its stratigraphic interest, with the denomination "MZ003: The Permian and Triassic of the Señorío de Molina" within the group of geological contexts "El rifting of Pangea and the Mesozoic successions of the Bética and Iberian mountain ranges".

== History ==
Ancient historians say the capital Molina, termed "Manlia" in old Latin chronicles, was founded by the Romans and built next to the village of Rillo de Gallo. In reality, the city of Manlia was at the head of a large Celtiberian territory for centuries before the confederation of Numantia.

Molina la Vieja is a previously inhabited area in the municipality of Rillo de Gallo. There are still remains distributed throughout the area that bear its name; vestiges of walls and rocks can be seen around this corner of the town. It is located one kilometer northeast of the town center and about 5 km northwest of present-day Molina de Aragón. The passage of the Cid (1048–1099) through Molina had to be through Molina la Vieja, populated by the Moors of Abengalbón, because the foundation of the current Molina was built by Christian kings later (Fuero de Molina was published in 1154). Francisco Núñez (1609) said that the foundations of many buildings and the ruins of his castle can be seen in Molina la Vieja, which was well-rendered and founded on a cut rock. It is said that the Moors who owned it left many treasures there when they were forced to abandon it. It is also said, among the Moors, that there are books indicating how and where to find these treasures. The repeated mention of Molina in the Cantar de mío Cid –up to ten times– is significant enough to consider it more than just a poetic resource devised by the author of the Poema.

Rillo de Gallo was the first place in Spain where a dinosaur footprint was found. The discovery took place in the year 1896 when a local resident found "the stone foot of a bug". The scholars of the time described it as "a petrified leg of a corpulent animal" and identified it as that of a Chirotherium. The specimen can be found in the Vertebrate and Prehistory Paleontology Collection of the National Museum of Natural Sciences. A sample of the evidence of the existence of reptiles in the fossil record is the traces of the Triassic found in the Museo Geominero in Madrid.

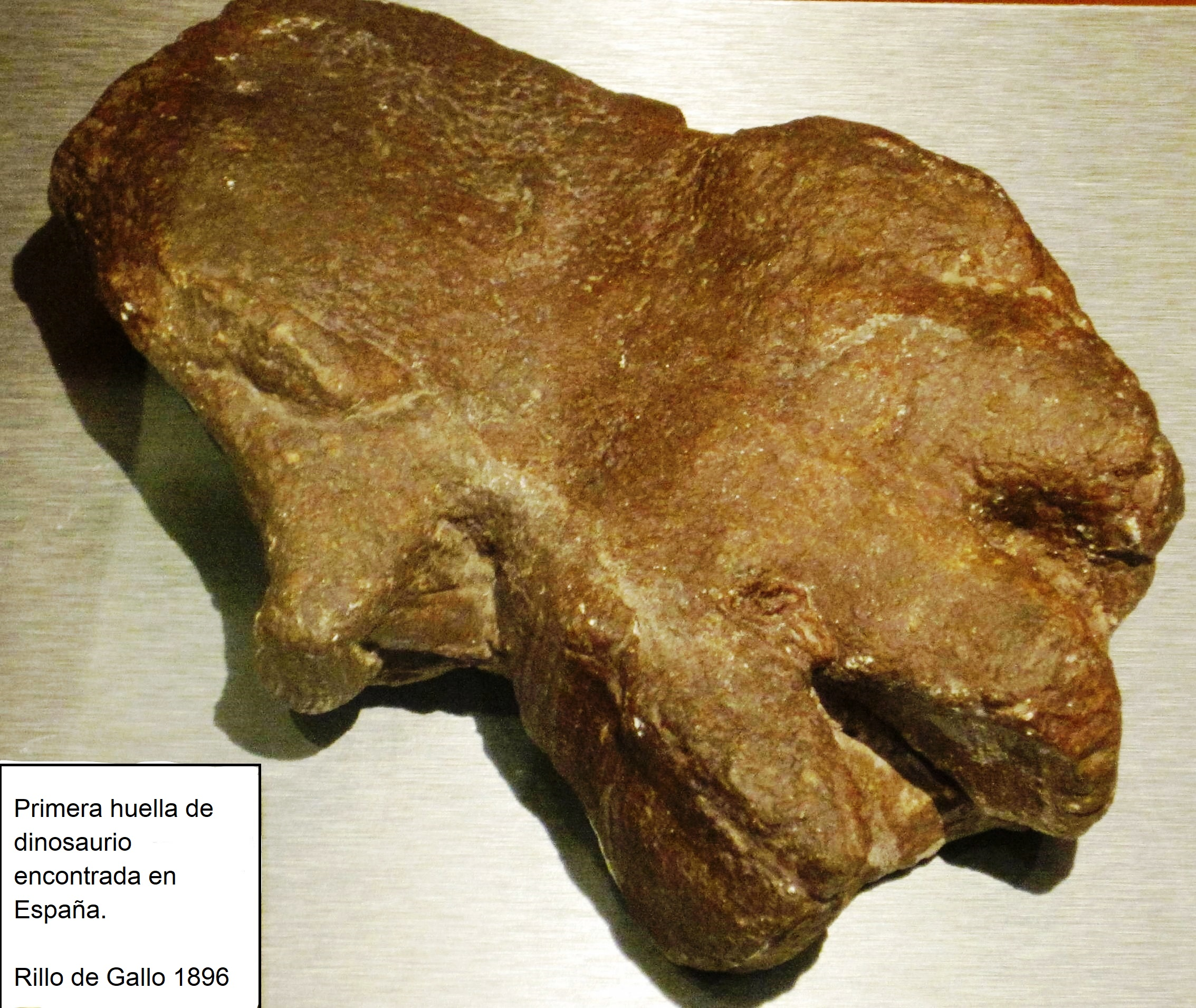
First dinosaur footprint found in Spain, in Rillo de Gallo 1896. Vertebrate and Prehistoric Paleontology Collection, MNCN

If you wish to know more about this, some studies have analyzed this in greater depth.

== Heritage ==
- The parochial church is a small building with espadaña to the west and a simple semicircular door to the south reminiscent of its medieval origins.
- The house of the marquises of Embid have traditional lines, with a magnificent baroque shield over the door. The fountain in the center of the square is dedicated as a monument to Calixto Rodríguez.
- The Capricho Rillano built by Juan Antonio Martínez on the edge of the road N-211 km 54 is a modernist building that follows a gaudiano model. The house, built of stone, includes elements from the forge and trencadís reminiscent of the work of the Catalan master. Perhaps its most prominent element is the serpent that falls from the roof over the entire height of the building, in reference to the legend collected in the 17th century by the Licentiate Francisco Núñez. The legend includes a gigantic snake as tall as a man in the nearby dehesa of Villacabras.
- El Abrigo del Llano (Rillo I and Rillo II) are two remains of cave paintings declared World Heritage sites by UNESCO in 1998 within the rock art of the Mediterranean arch of the Iberian peninsula and the Property of Cultural Interest since 17 February 1997. They are the only two such paintings in the province of Guadalajara.

== Folklore and customs ==
A celebration occurred on September 8, 9, and 10th, celebrating the Nativity of the Virgin Mary, the Fiestecilla, and the Abuela respectively. Historically, the festivals were not celebrated in the month of August.

== Gastronomy ==
The municipality is known for its delicacies such as sausages, especially blood sausages and chorizo.
