= Rueda (surname) =

Rueda is a Spanish surname. Notable people with the surname include:

- Agustín Rueda (1952–1978), Spanish anarchist and activist
- Aitor Monroy Rueda (born 1987), Spanish footballer
- Alfonso Rueda (born 1968), Spanish politician
- Antonio Vasconcelos Rueda (born 1970), Mexican politician
- Armando Rueda (1929–2018), Mexican weightlifter
- Arnoldo Rueda Medina (born 1969), former Mexican drug lord
- Belén Rueda (born 1965), Spanish actress
- Carla Rueda (born 1990), Peruvian volleyball player
- Claudia Rueda, Colombian picture book author and illustrator
- David Rueda, Ecuadorian professor of comparative politics
- Diego Rueda Rico (1575–1639), Roman Catholic prelate
- Eduardo Rueda (born 1972), Mexican diver
- Esteban Rueda (born 1996), Argentine footballer
- Eva Rueda (born 1971), Spanish artistic gymnast
- Fábio Rueda (born 1977), Brazilian politician
- Fabiola Rueda (born 1963), Colombian mountain runner
- Fran Rueda (born 1997), Spanish racing driver
- Francisco Rueda (diver) (born 1958), Mexican diver
- Héctor Rueda Hernández (1920–2011), Colombian Roman Catholic prelate
- Iñaki Rueda, Spanish Formula One engineer
- Javier Ruiz Rueda (1909–1993), Mexican composer and writer
- Jesús Rueda (composer) (born 1961), Spanish composer
- Jesús Rueda (footballer) (born 1987), Spanish footballer
- José Rueda (1900-????), Brazilian footballer
- José Antonio Rueda (born 2005), Spanish motorcycle racer
- José Manuel Rueda (born 1988), Spanish footballer
- Julio Jiménez Rueda (1896–1960), Mexican lawyer, writer, playwright and diplomat
- Kevin Rueda (born 1969), American soccer player
- Lizeth Rueda (born 1994), Mexican distance swimmer
- Lope de Rueda (c.1510–1565), Spanish dramatist and author
- Luis Rueda (born 1972), Argentine footballer and coach
- Luis José Rueda Aparicio (born 1962), Colombian Roman Catholic prelate
- Manuel Rueda (born 1980), Spanish footballer
- Marta Ruedas, United Nations civil servant
- Matías Rueda (born 1988), Argentine boxer
- Martin Rueda, Swiss footballer
- Mikel Rueda (born 1980), Spanish film director and screenwriter
- Mónica Rueda (born 1976), Spanish field hockey player
- Paula Andrea Rodriguez Rueda (born 1996), Colombian chess player
- Ramsés Rueda Rueda, Colombian air force general
- Rafael Pardo Rueda (born 1953), Colombian politician
- Reinaldo Rueda (born 1957), Colombian football manager
- Reyna Rueda (born 1969/1970), Nicaraguan politician
- Toni Casals Rueda (born 1980), Andorran ski mountaineer
