= Coordinadora de presos en lucha =

Prisoners political organization

Coordination of prisoners in struggle
- Coordinadora de presos en lucha
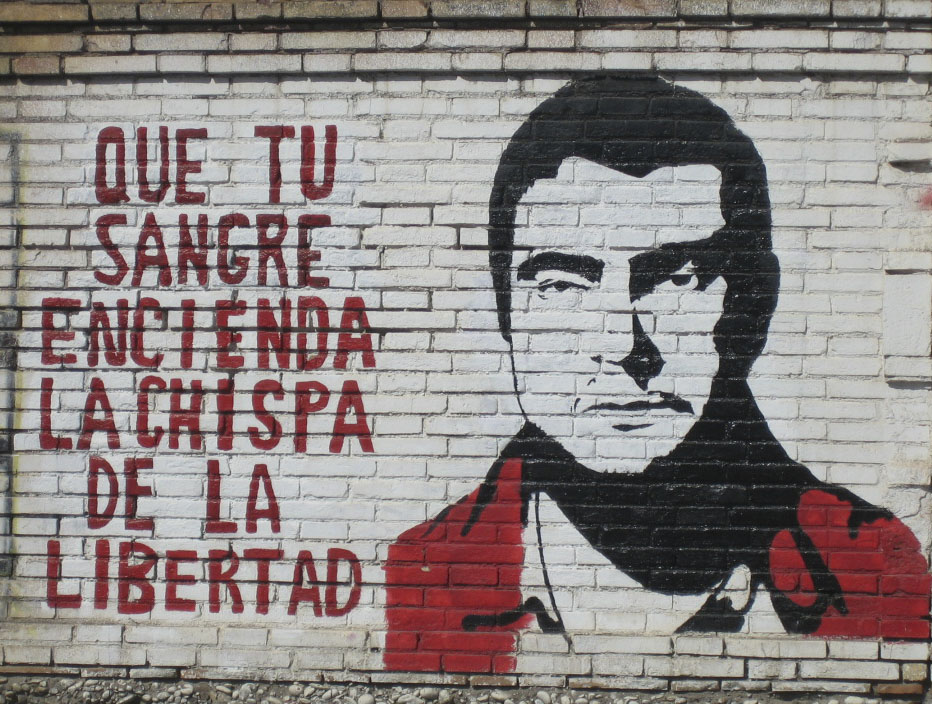
- Graffiti of Agustin Rueda (murdered in 1978 by prison personnel), reading "May your blood light the spark of freedom"
- Abbreviation: COPEL
- Formation: 1976
- Dissolved: 1979
- Type: Prisoners political organization
- Purpose: Amnesty or pardon for all prisoners

The Coordinadora de Presos en Lucha (COPEL, English: Coordination of prisoners in struggle) was a movement created in the end of 1976 in the Carabanchel prison by a group of prisoners with the help of a group of lawyers and it aimed to achieve amnesty or pardon for all prisoners (including political and non-political ones) and to improve the living conditions in prisons.

== Claims ==
On 23 January 1977, COPEL published an announcement making public their specific claims:

- General amnesty or pardon
- Abolition of torture and of mistreatment that violates human rights
- Decent food
- Effective sanitary measures
- Abolition of disciplinary punishment of indefinite isolation
- Change of the rules regulating the visits so that they are not humiliating for the prisoners and their families or friends.
- Creation of intimate visits
- Abolition of censoring mails
- Reform of the criminal code to adjust sentences to the social reality.
- A fairly paid job
- Appeal of the Law on dangerousness and social rehabilitation
- Access to education and the right to have libraries
- Improvements on the prison facilities
- Right to conditional release
- Redemption of sentence through work for all prisoners equally

At the same time, the Association of Relatives and Friends of Prisoners and Ex-Prisoners (AFAPE) was founded to spread the claims of prisoners outside of the prisons with the help of Confederación Nacional del Trabajo (CNT).

== Actions ==
Starting in the end of 1976, a series of protest actions started to take place, in prisons and out of them. The protest actions of prisoners included tens of prison revolts, hunger strikes, collective self-injuring and were accompanied by numerous solidarity protests outside prisons. The solidarity with prisoners day in the faculty of information sciences in Madrid, gained the help of some writers, philosophers and professors such as José Luis López Aranguren, Chicho Sánchez Ferlosio, Agustín García Calvo y Fernando Savater.

The most notorious action was the riot organized in the Carabanchel prison on 18 July 1977, during which several prisoners went to the roof of the prison with a banner of COPEL, and when the riot police entered, even more (around 800) prisoners went up to the roof shouting Amnesty, while others cut their wrists in order to be sent to the hospital. The riot was put down four days later and the authorities decided to transfer the prisoners who climbed onto the roof of the Cartagena prison. There were also similar vein cutting acts in Córdoba, and other prisons such as in Burgos, Ocaña and Dueso. When the riots spread to numerous prisons, prominent artists, politicians and trade unionists also started supporting the general amnesty.

A turning point was on 13 March 1978, when the Catalan anarchist and COPEL member Agustín Rueda Sierra died as a result of torture inflicted in the Carabanchel prison. As a result of the scandal, the General Difrector of Penitentiary Institutions was assassinated some days afterwards.

After the de-penalization of homosexuality and the approval of the General Penitenciary Law in 1979, that satisfied some of COPEL's claims, the protest actions of the non-political prisoners stopped.

== In popular culture ==
The 2022 film Modelo 77, directed by Alberto Rodríguez documents some actions of COPEL while following in more detail a prisoners revolt in La Model prison of Barcelona.
