= Luís Andrés Edo =

Spanish militant and historian

Luís Andrés Edo (7 November 1925 – 14 February 2009) was a militant and historian of Spain's anarchosyndicalist movement the CNT.

== Early life ==
Born in Caspe, he moved early to Barcelona and was educated at the Escola Nova Unificada, living through the 1936 coup and the subsequent deprivations of the Civil War.

== Activism during the Spanish State ==
Edo spent many years in jail or in exile in Francoist Spain. His first incarceration was in Figueras castle in 1947 after refusing military service, he escaped to France and was arrested the next year on his clandestine re-entry to the country. He again escaped and went into exile.

On its creation after the re-unification congress of 1961, he formed part of the CNT's Defensa Interior, created to fight against Francoist Spain. He was arrested in 1966 in Madrid, spending the time until 1974 in Carabanchel, Soria and Segovia prisons where he wrote La corriente. In that time he met other anti-Francoist prisoners such as Stuart Christie After a brief spell (1972–1974) in Paris, he returned and was again arrested (on 1 May 1974) and remained in jail until the Amnesty of 1976. While in prison Edo devised a system to keep prisoners informed of news and organized protests and solidarity actions.

== Later years ==
After the transition to democracy, the CNT in Catalonia was refounded with Edo on the Regional Committee. He served as General Secretary and Editor of the CNT newspaper Solidaridad Obrera. In his later life, Edo worked on passing on knowledge of the history and methods of the Spanish libertarian movement. He was regarded as a vital link with the pre-Francoist CNT and died of a heart attack on 14 February 2009.

== Published works ==
- La Corriente. la Fundació d’Estudis Llibertaris i Anarcosindicalistes.
- Edo, Luis Andrés (2006). La CNT en la encrucijada. Aventuras de un heterodoxo. Flor del Viento Ediciones. ISBN 84-96495-14-0.

== Sources ==
- Antoni Segura, Luís Andrés Edo, histórico anarquista, El Pais, 15 February 2009 available online
- Obituario: Luis Andrés Edo, histórico anarquista
