= Ocón =

- Municipality
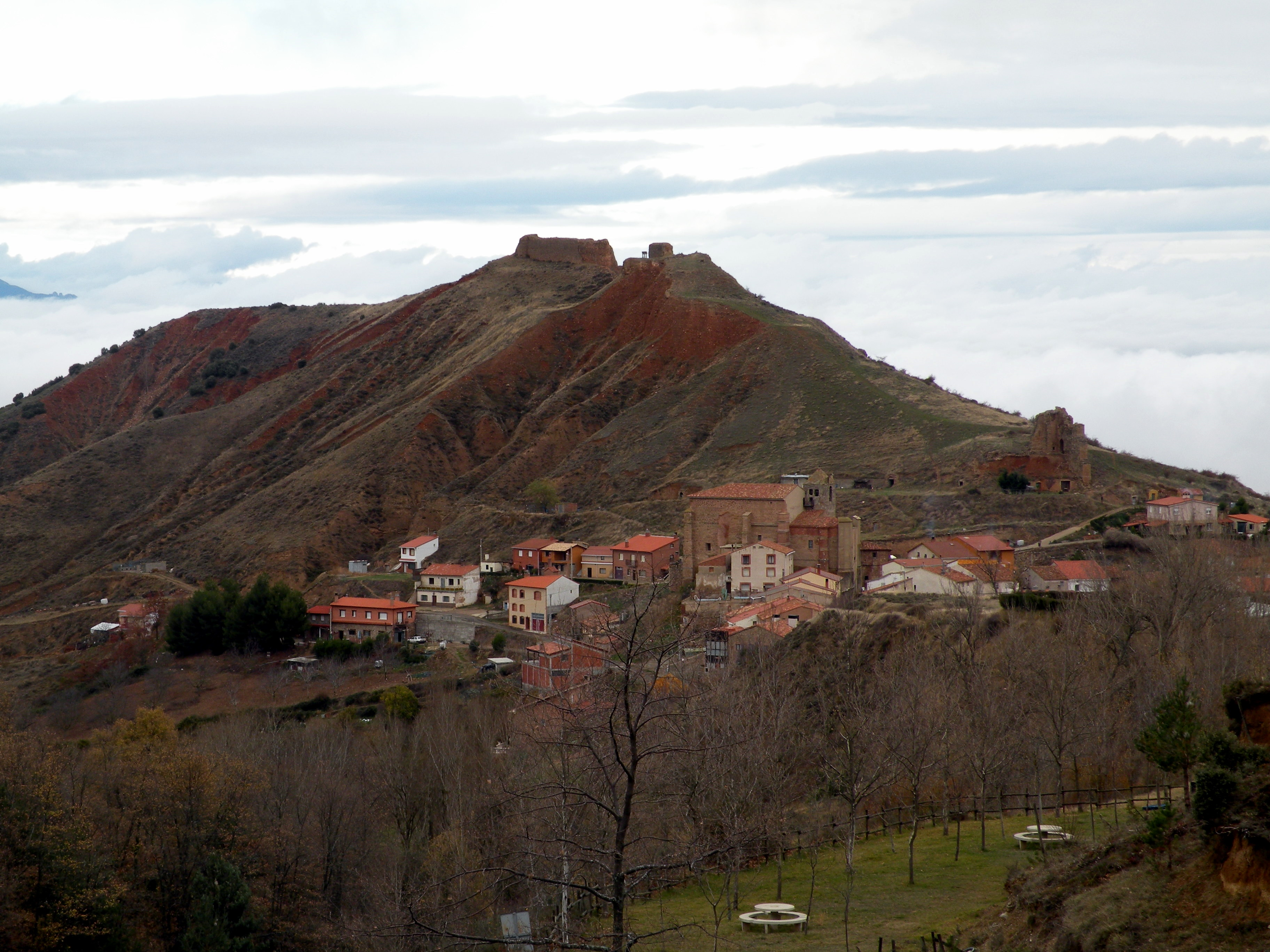
- View of Ocón

- Location within La Rioja, Spain Location within Spain
- Coordinates: 42°17′51″N 2°14′42″W
- Country: Spain
- Autonomous community: La Rioja
- Comarca: Logroño

Government
  - Mayor: Ernesto Viguera Blanco (PP)

Area
  - Total: 60.92 km^{2} (23.52 sq mi)
- Elevation: 898 m (2,946 ft)

Population (2025-01-01)
  - Total: 312
- Demonym: oconense
- Postal code: 26148
- Website: www.elvalledeocon.org

Ocón is a municipality of the autonomous community of La Rioja (Spain). Its population in January 2006 was 322 inhabitants over a 34.3 square kilometer area. It is formed by the villages La Villa, Pipaona, Aldealobos, Las Ruedas, Santa Lucía and Los Molinos.
