= La Model (Barcelona) =

Barcelona Men's Penitentiary Center
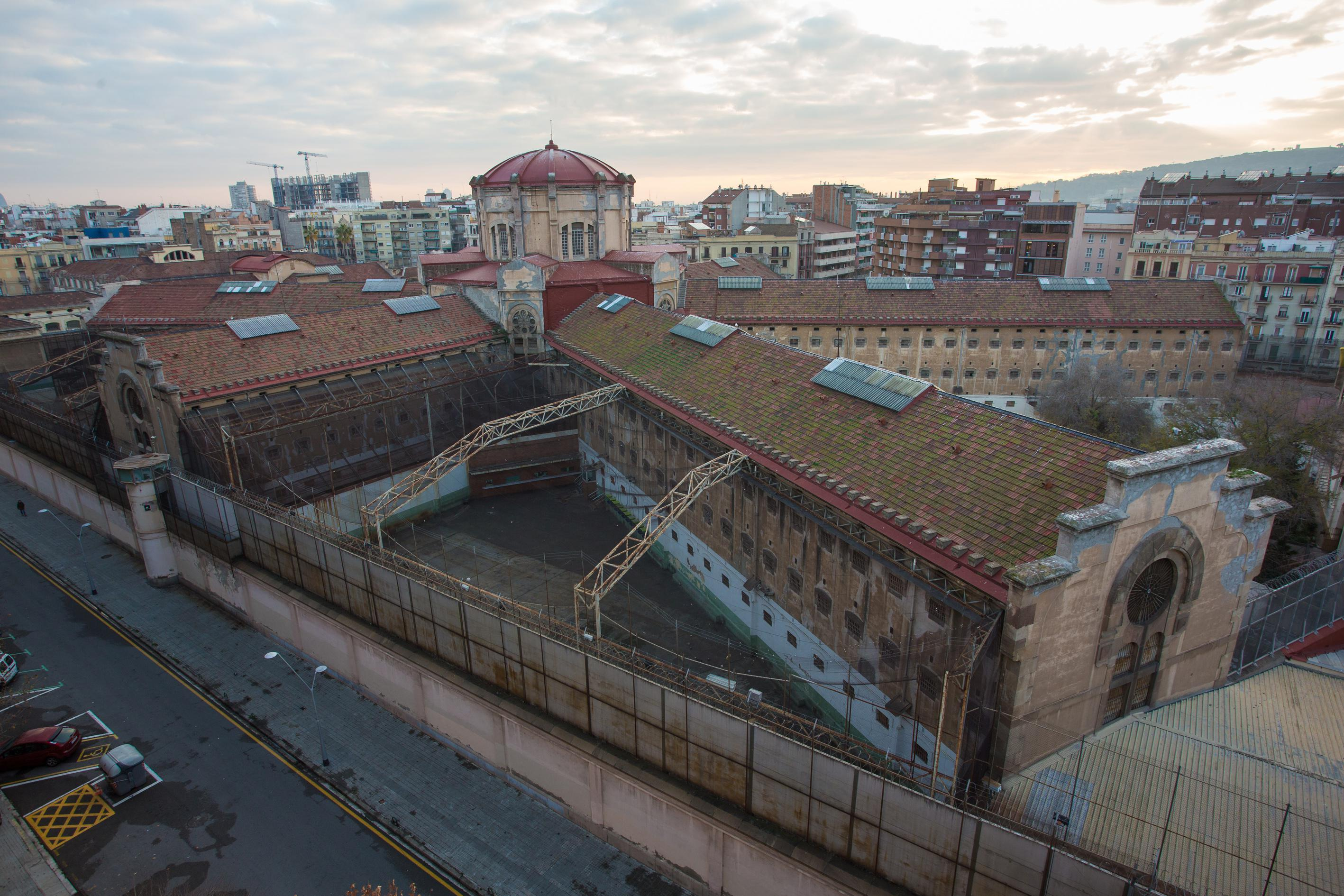
- Alternative names: La Model

General information
- Location: Barcelona
- Address: Carrer d'Entença, 155

Design and construction
- Architect(s): Josep Domènech i Estapà, Salvador Vinyals i Sabaté

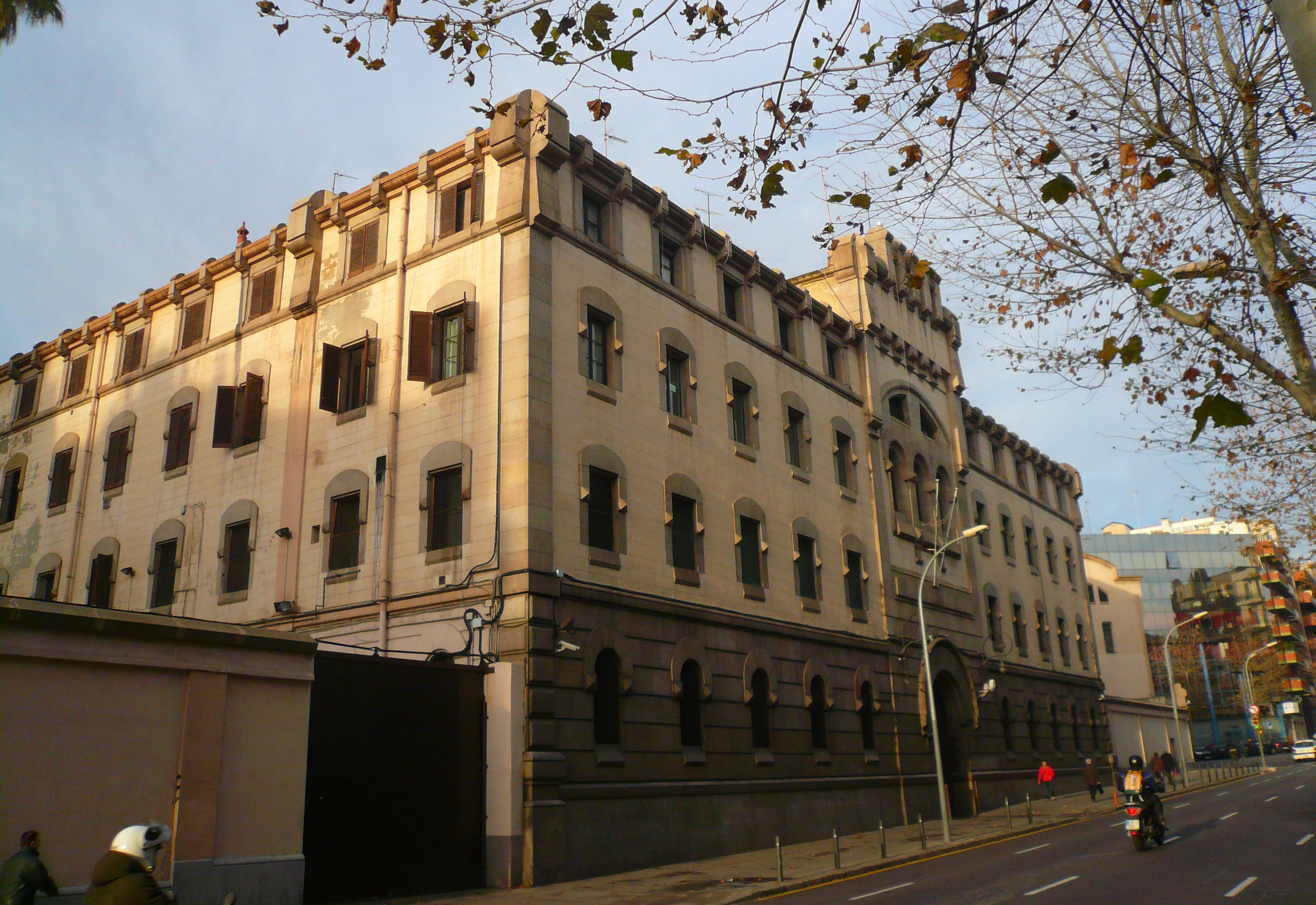
Main façade.

The Barcelona Men's Penitentiary Center, more widely known as la Model (in Catalan language), is a former penitentiary center located in Barcelona, that was used as a prison until 2017. It currently serves as a memorial space, open to the public for visits.

== History ==
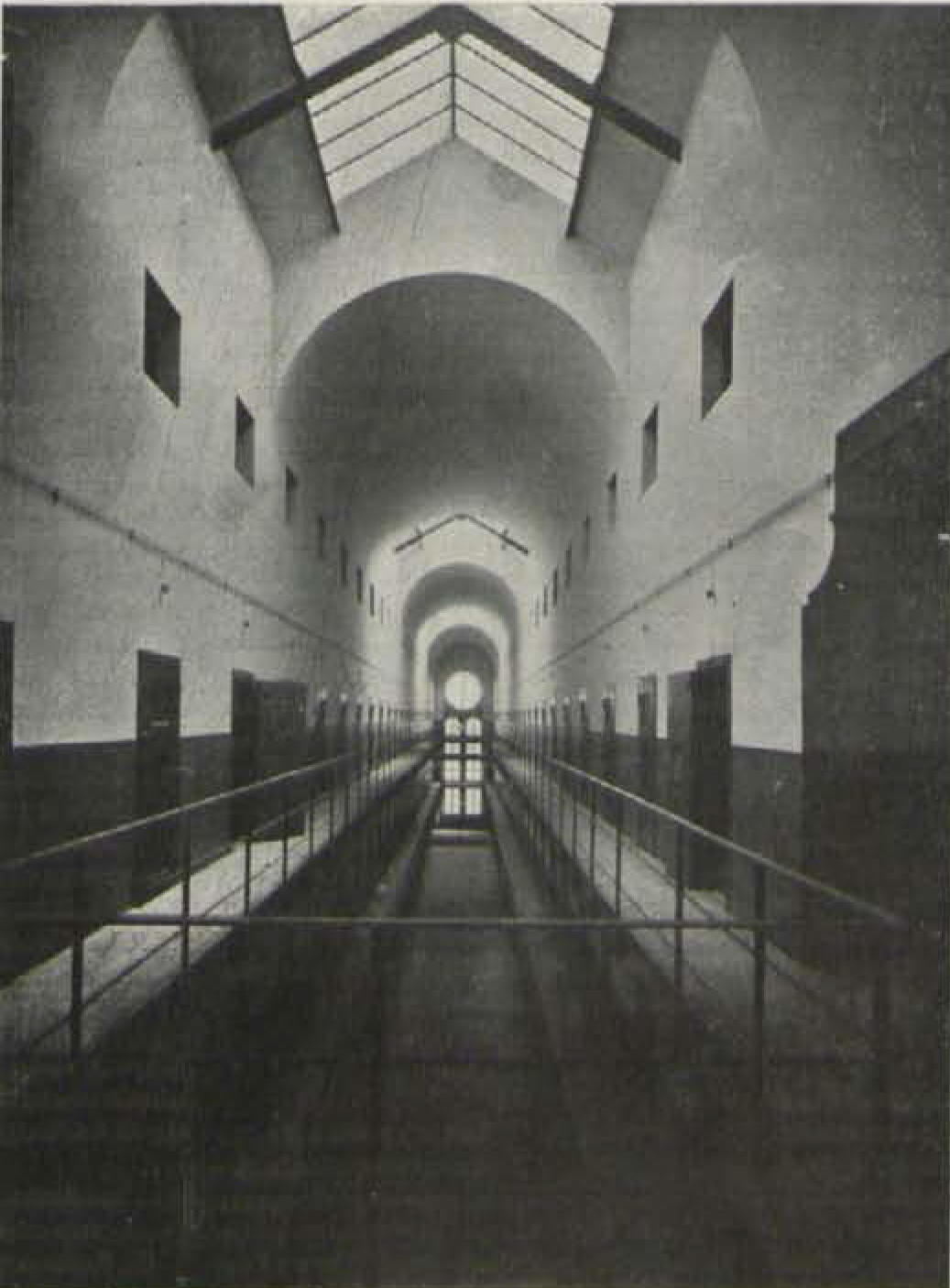
Corridor of the prison (1904).

The building was constructed between 1881 and 1904 under the supervision of the architects Josep Domènech i Estapà and Salvador Vinyals i Sabaté, and based on the panopticon "model" prison design proposed in 1787 by the utilitarian philosopher Jeremy Bentham.

La Model was inaugurated on 9 June 1904, with its original name being Cellular Prison, but it was informally given the name Model because it was to serve as a model for the new penitentiary reform undertaken in those years; Over time the name became official.

Each of the prison's 6 corridors was used for a different "category" of prisoners: the 1st for primary inmates; the 2nd for inmates with good behavior; the 3rd for second offenders with adapted behavior; the 4th for second offenders with adaptation difficulties; the 5th for primary inmates and prisoners who worked in the prison; and the 6th for prisoners in solitary confinement.

The motto of its board was In severitate humanitas (Humanity in severity) and revealed a new penitentiary conception according to which punishment was no longer conceived as revenge or intimidation and became, increasingly, a mechanism for social reintegration.

Besides common prisoners, it was an incarceration center for political dissidents, especially during the dictatorships of Primo de Rivera and of Franco. It was also used to imprison participants in strikes and protest movements such as the Tragic Week (1909), the Canadenca Strike (1919) or the Barcelona Tram Strike (1951) or of political movements such as the Assembly of Catalonia. Famous political prisoners housed there include Francesc Ferrer, Lluís Companys, Salvador Seguí and Helios Gómez. La model was also the place of the execution with garrote vil of Salvador Puig Antich in 1974. During the francoist dictatorship, when it became a symbol of repression, it was also a place of incarceration of homosexuals. The prominent transgender activist Silvia Reyes (1949–2024) was imprisoned here for being a "transvestite" (the then-current term for a trans woman) in 1974 before being transferred to Carabanchel Prison in Madrid.

Throughout its 113 years of history as a prison it was empty on two occasions, at the beginning and at the end of the Spanish Civil War. The first time was on 19 July 1936, when anarchists liberated the 851 prisoners. On 23 January 1939, some hundreds of prisoners were taken to the borders with France by Servicio de Información Militar, some of them being executed and others freed. Three days later, hours before the entrance of fascist troops into the city, all of the remaining prisoners were liberated, including both members of the nationalist faction and militants of the CNT and the POUM.

In 1984 the prison became famous after an inmates' riot and the escape of the well-known criminal Juan José Moreno Cuenca.

The penitentiary center closed permanently on 8 June 2017, and is currently used as a center of memory, open to the public for guided or unguided visits.

== In popular culture ==
The 2022 film Prison 77, depicting a 1977 revolt of prisoners of la Model, was filmed mostly in the actual site of the old prison.

== Gallery ==
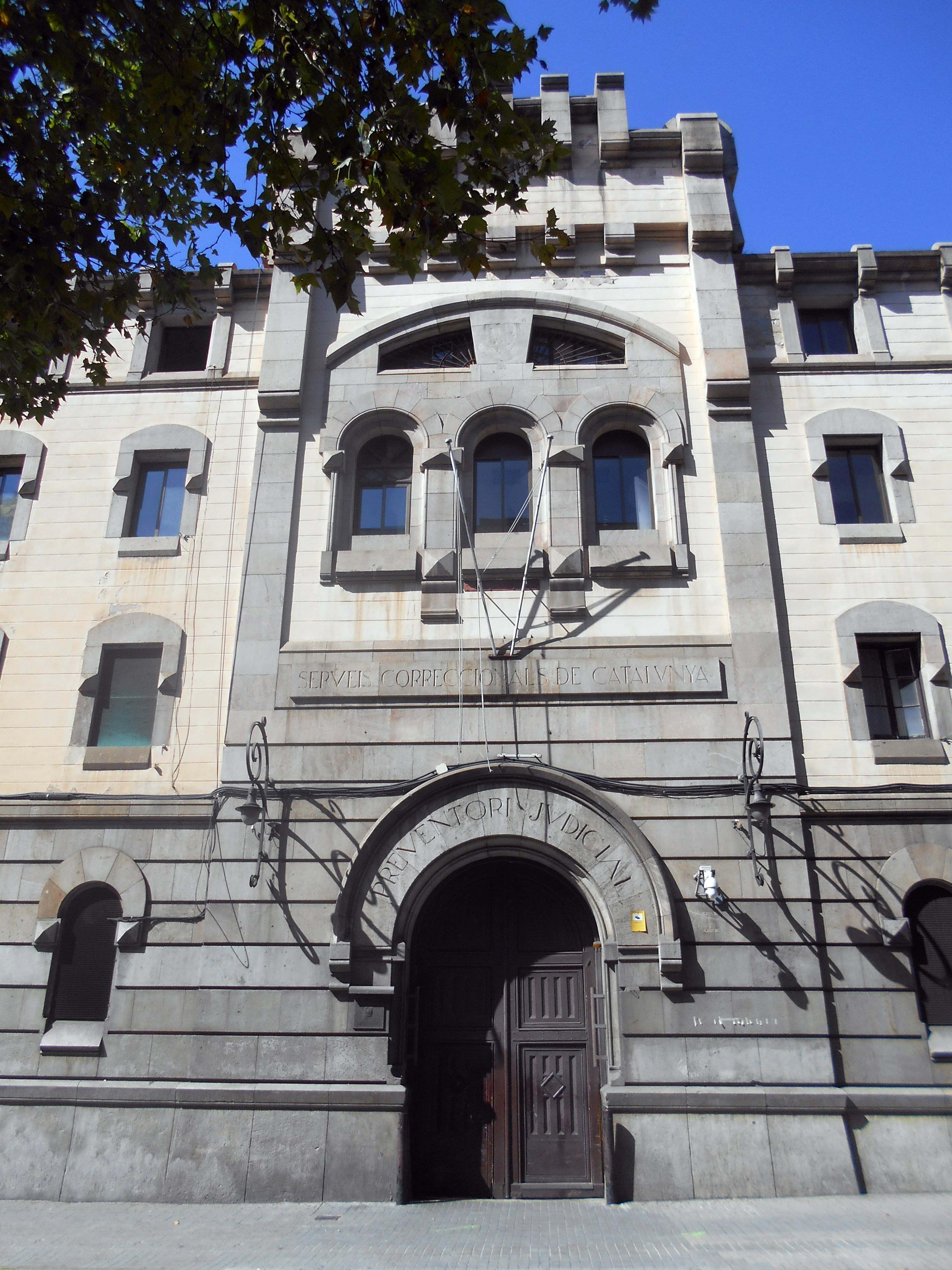
Principal access to the prison

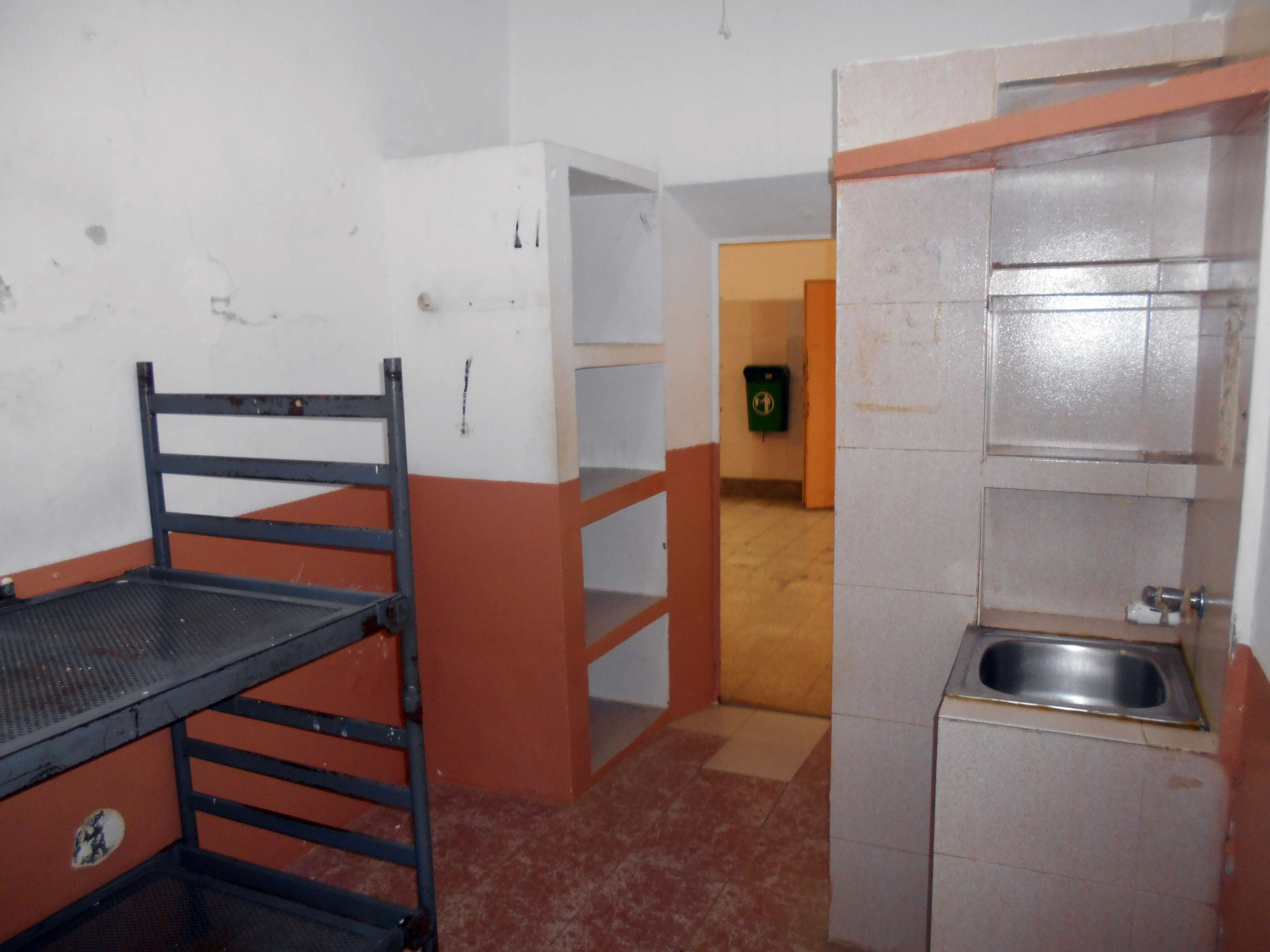
One of the prison's cells

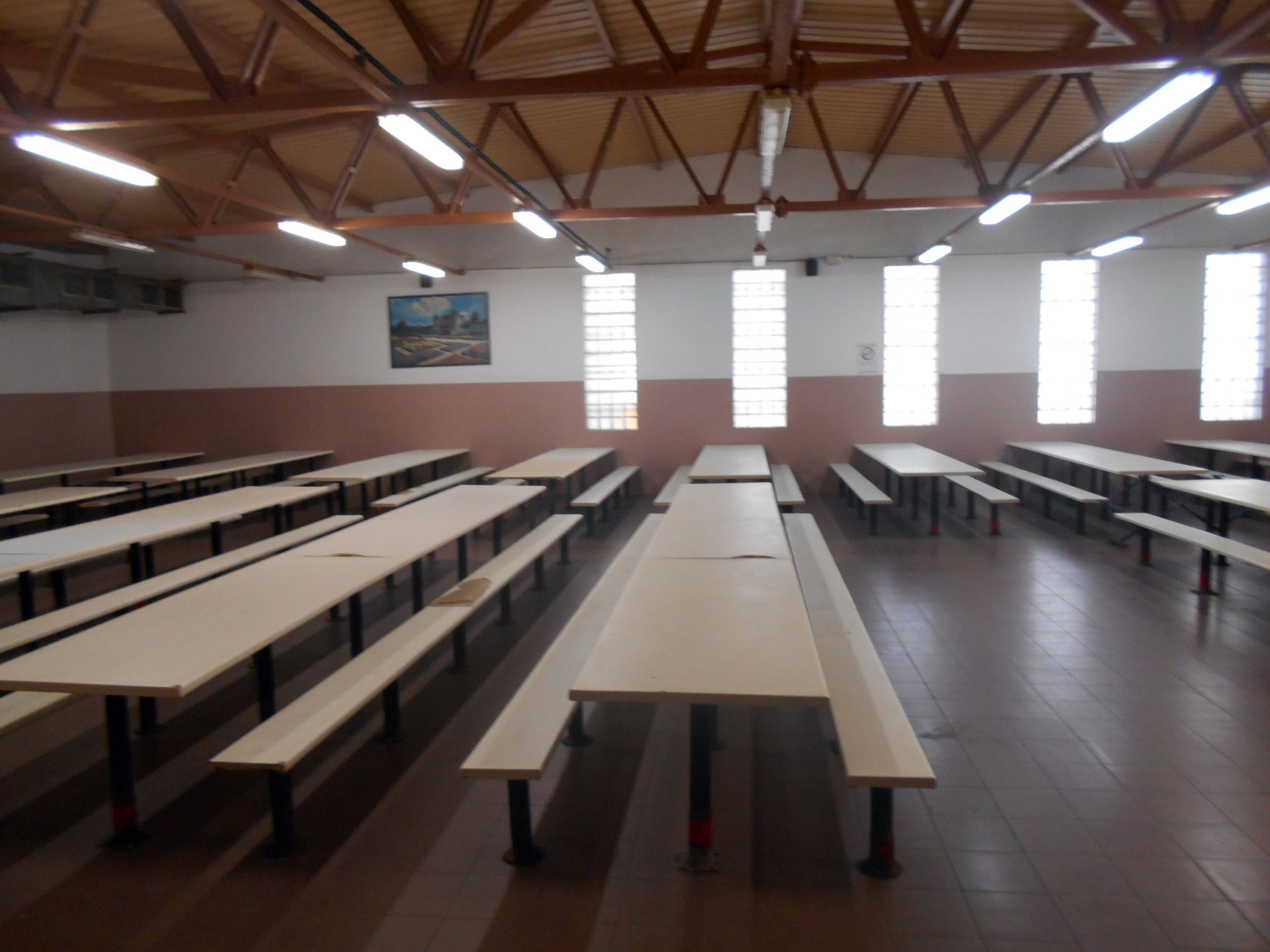
Dining room

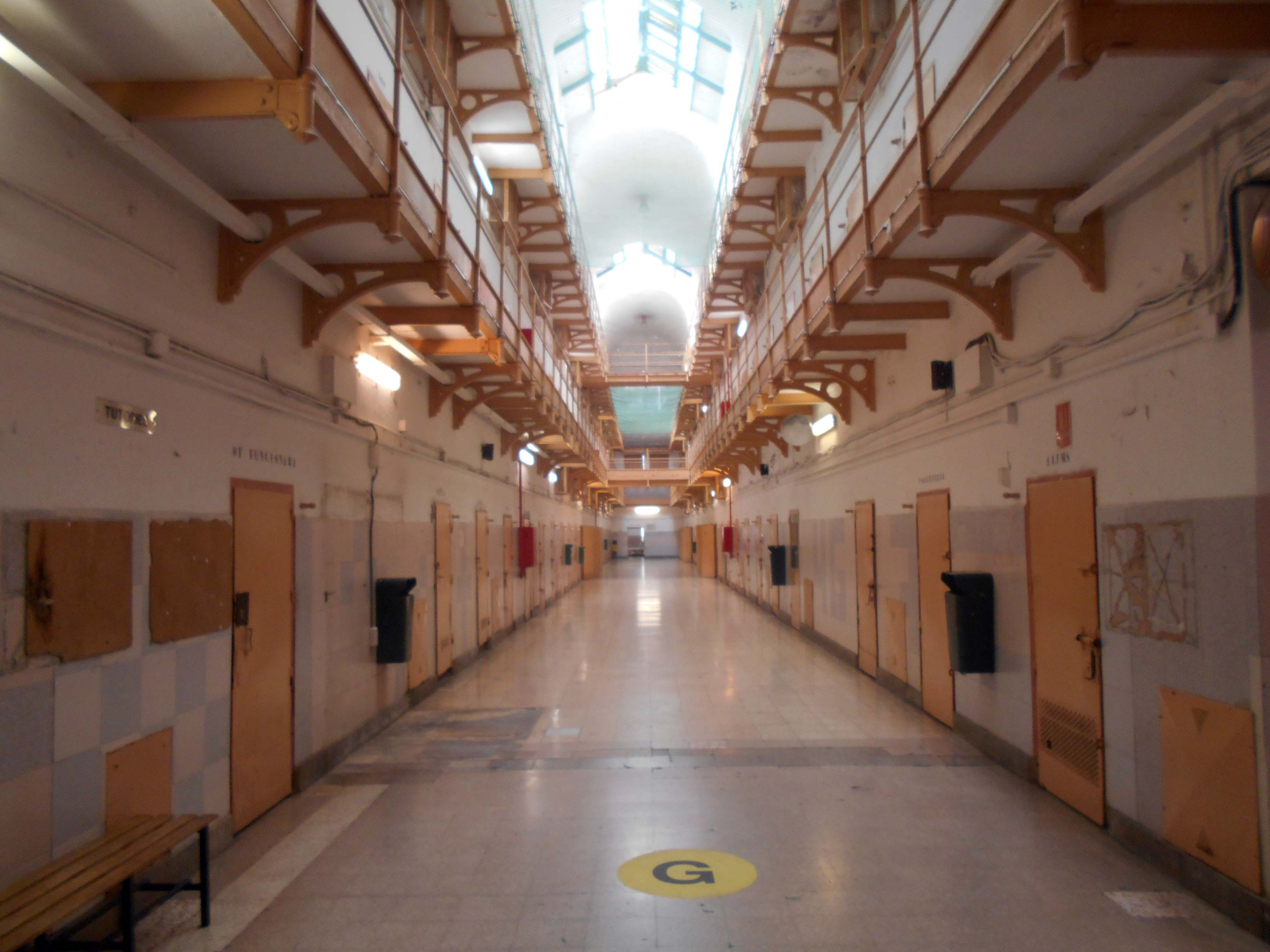
Corridor 4

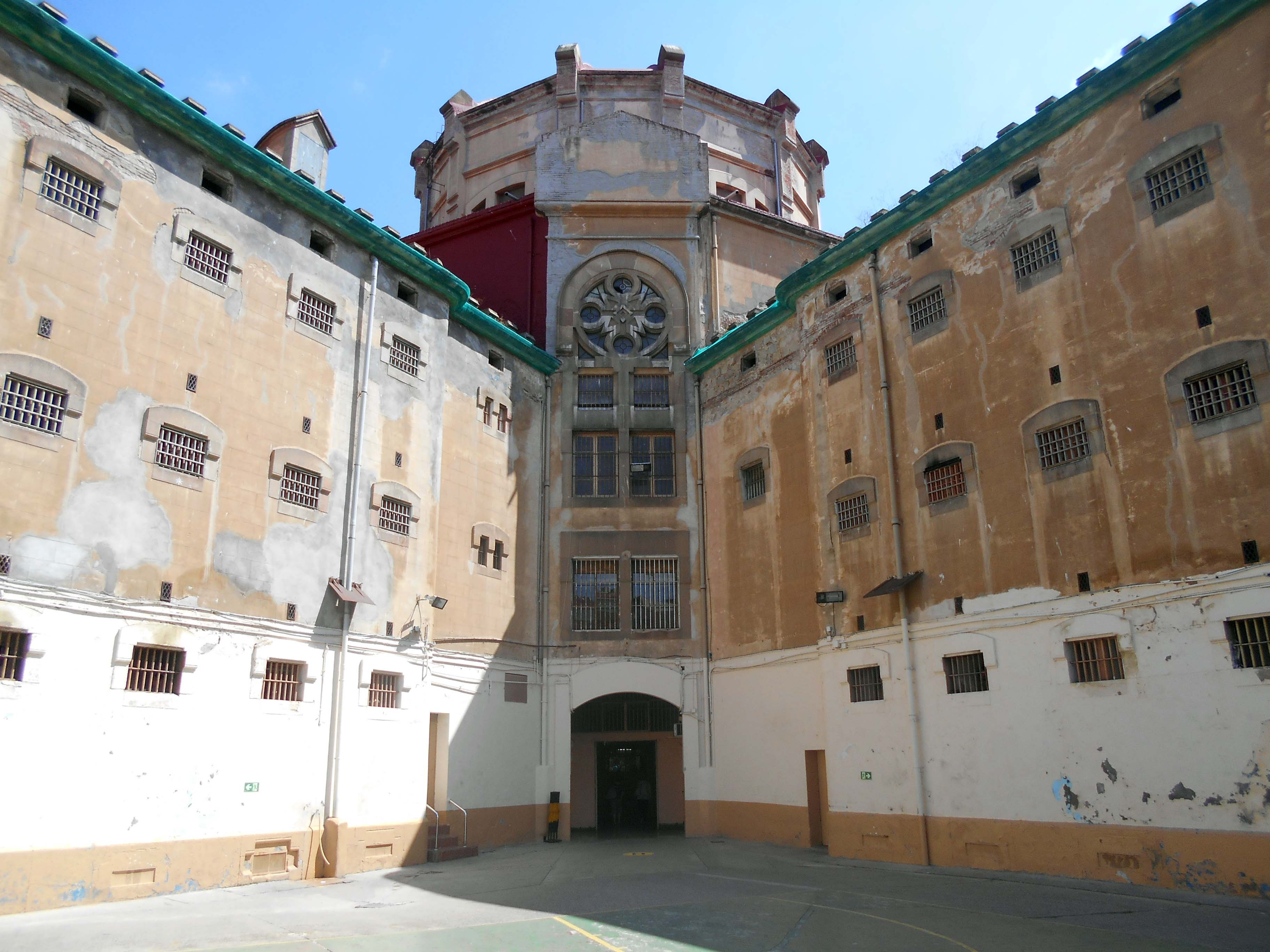
Courtyard

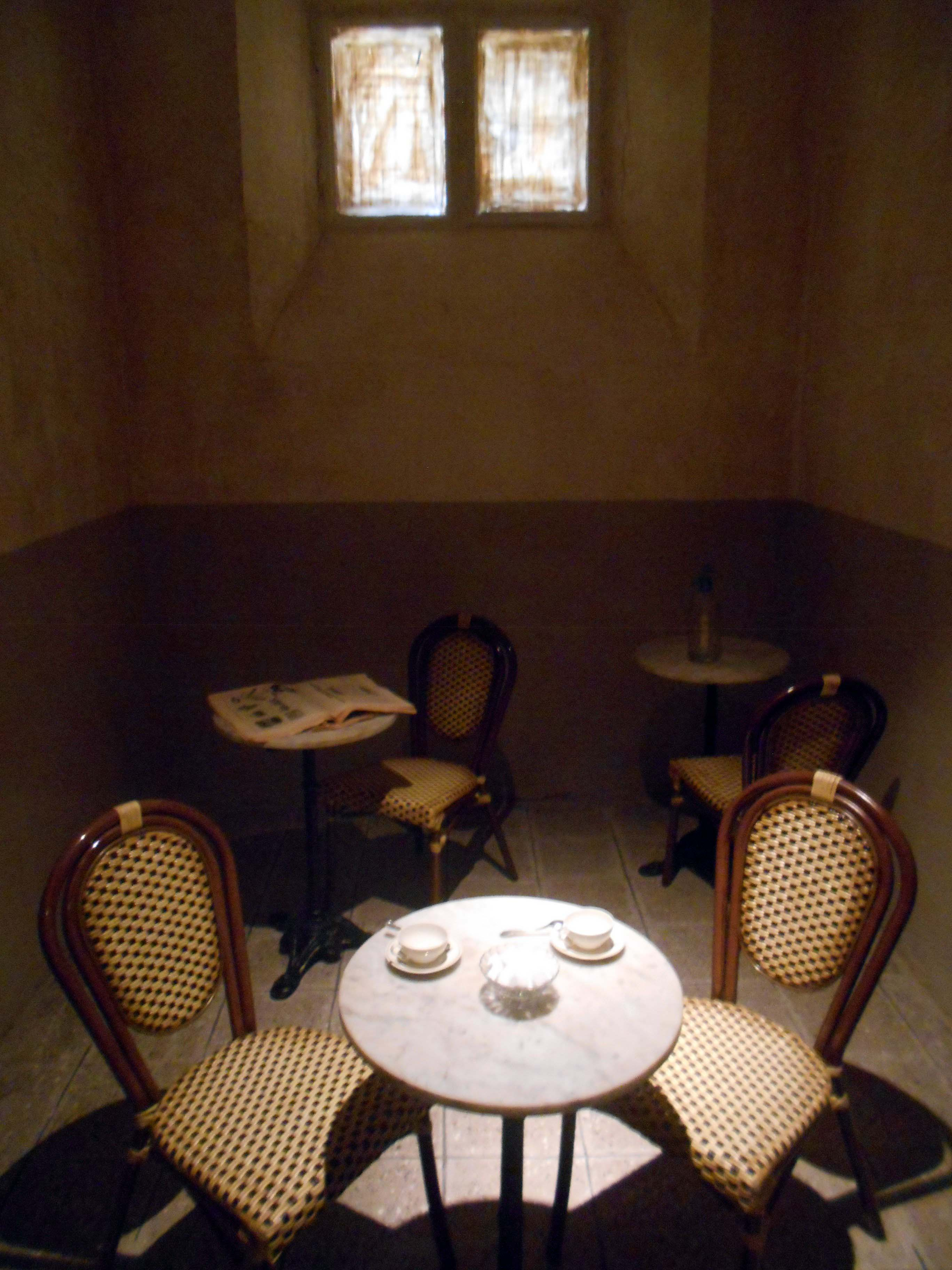
Cell of Lluís Companys

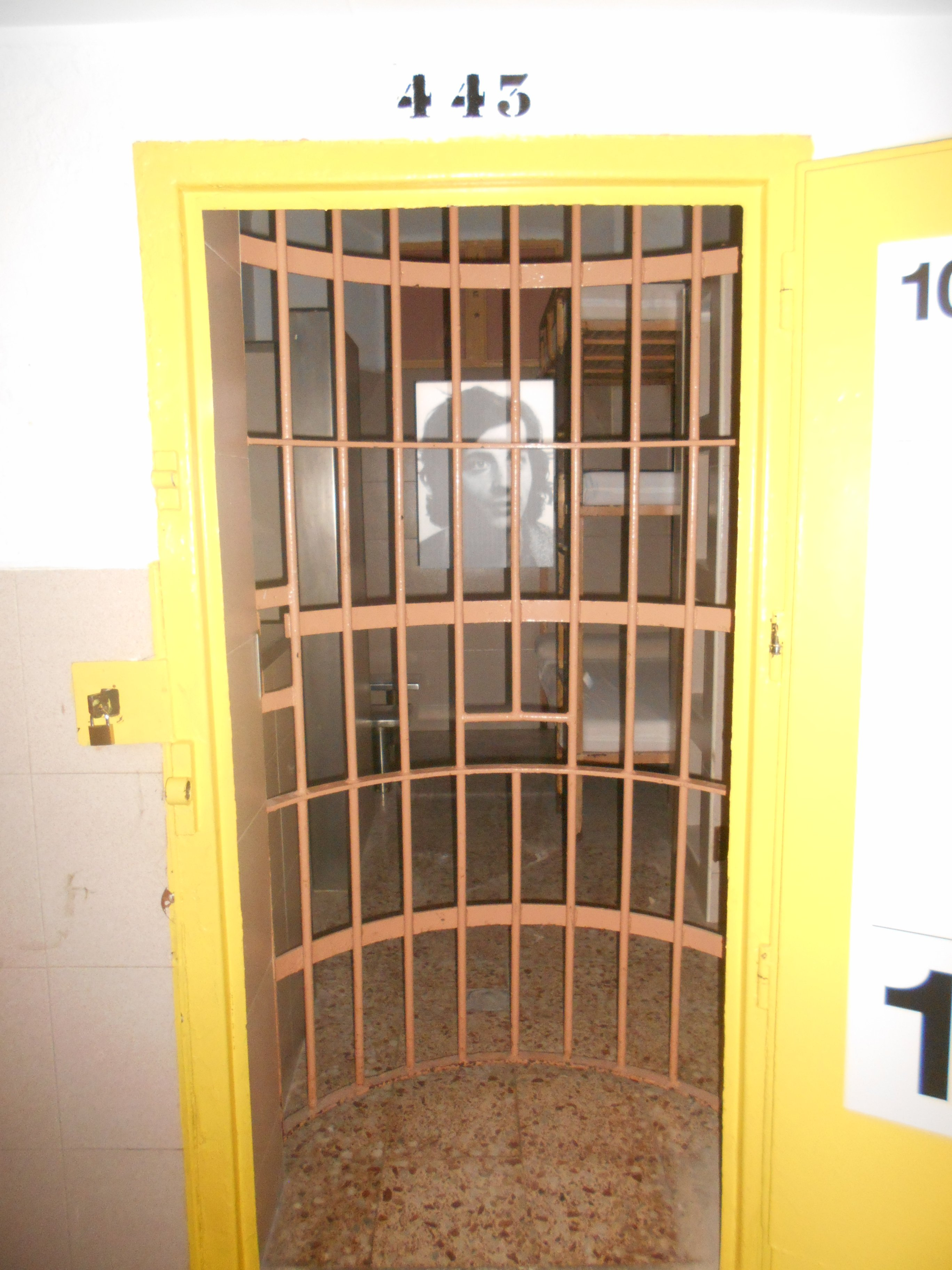
Cell of Salvador Puig Antich
