= Pipaona =

- Populated place
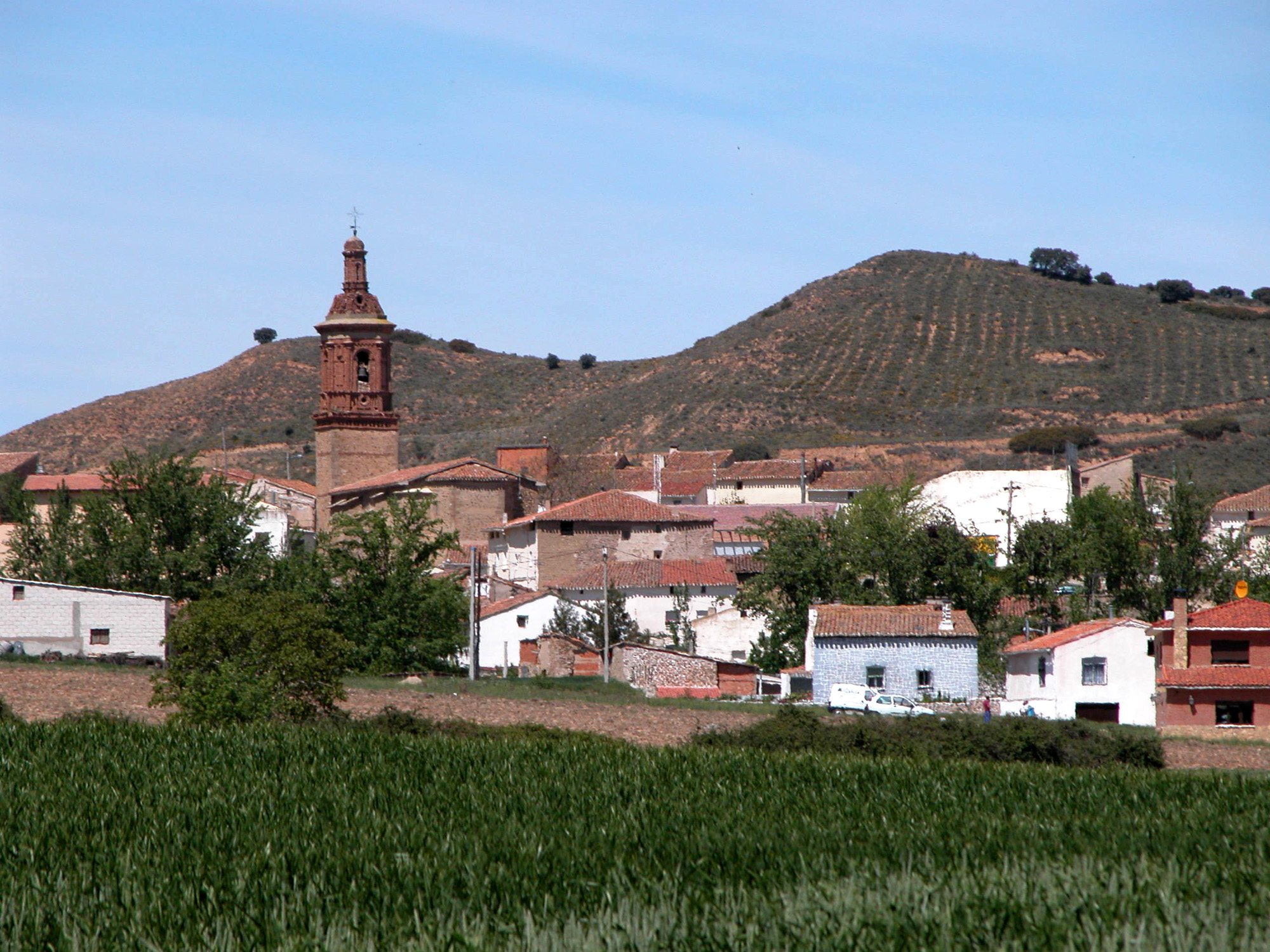
- View of Pipaona

- Location within La Rioja, Spain Location within Spain
- Country: Spain
- Autonomous community: La Rioja
- Comarca: Logroño

Population
  - Total: 49
- Postal code: 26147

Pipaona is a village in the municipality of Ocón, in the province and autonomous community of La Rioja, Spain. As of 2018, it had a population of 49 people.
