= Silvia Reyes =

Spanish transgender activist (1949–2024)

Silvia Reyes Plata
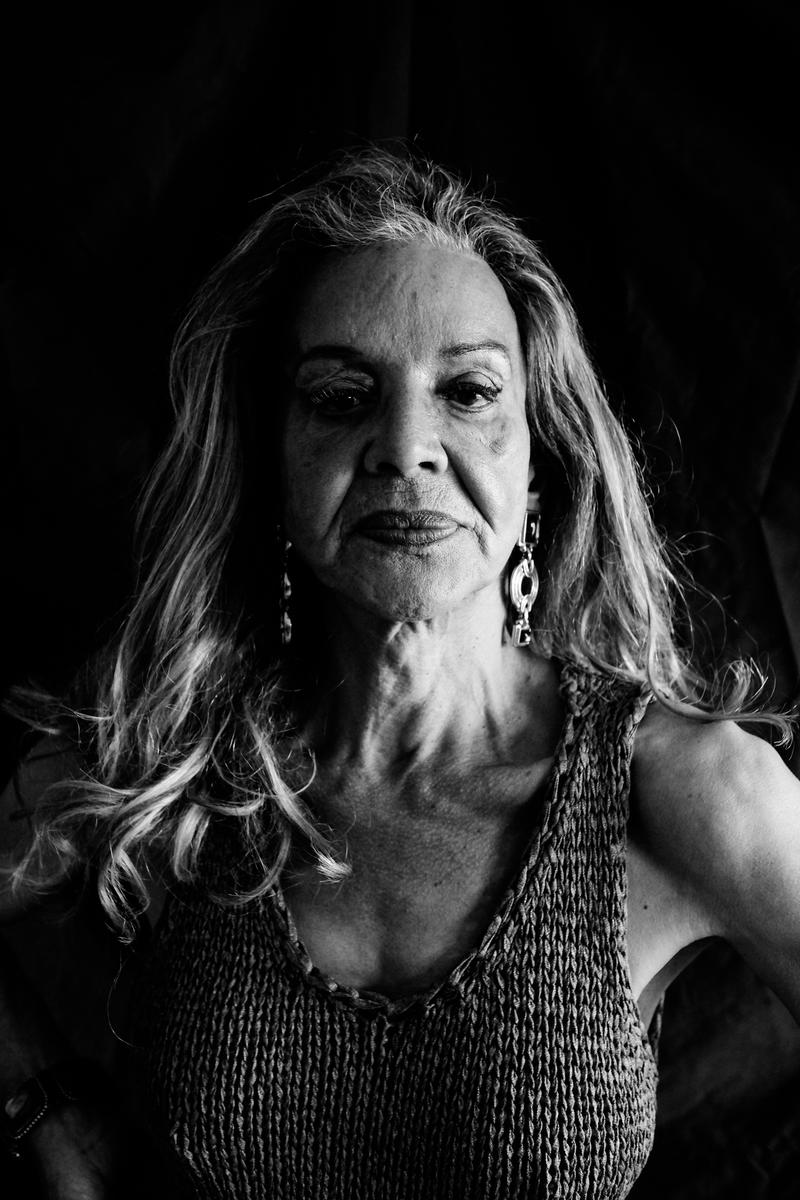
- Reyes in 2018
- Born: 1949; Las Palmas de Gran Canaria, Spain
- Died: 22 May 2024 (aged 75); Barcelona, Spain
- Occupations: Sex worker Nightclub performer Trans activist

Silvia Reyes Plata (1949 – 22 May 2024) was a Spanish transgender activist linked with Barcelona's LGBT movement. She took part in the historic Barcelona 1977 pride parade, held on 26 June that year. It was the first great act of LGBT visibility in Spain, and was peaceful until police opened fire with rubber bullets.

== Life ==
At the age of 17, Reyes was awarded a scholarship to study medicine, but she could not begin her course of studies because her teachers told her that if she wanted to go to university, she could not pluck her eyebrows, and she would also have to dress like a man. This situation, along with the physical and psychological abuse that she got from her family led her to leave home and go to live in Barcelona, determined as she was not to give up her identity.

Reyes arrived in the Catalonian capital in 1973, four months after having ended her military service. She sought work in hotels, given her experience over the last seven years, but Reyes, who had begun her hormone therapy in 1974 "with products that I was buying at a pharmacy", was systematically rejected for having a female appearance and a male name. During this first month, she was detained three times, as at that time – because of the 1970 Law on dangerousness and social rehabilitation – it was not safe for a transsexual person to be on the street, nor at gay bars or cinemas. When the 5,000 pesetas that Reyes had brought along with her to Catalonia was running out, she found that she had to turn to prostitution.

Late in 1974 she was detained in yet another raid and taken to La Model, a prison in Barcelona, for being a transvestite; (Note: At that time, the word "transsexual" was not yet used, and transgender women were called "transvestites".) she was later taken to Carabanchel Prison in Madrid, and later still to a centre for "social rehabilitation" (that is to say, to be cured of homosexuality) in Badajoz, which lasted for six months.

As the law on dangerousness and social rehabilitation required those found guilty to go into exile, when Reyes had completed her sentence and was released in late 1975, she had to leave Catalonia, although she thereafter came back to Barcelona once a month. On one of these visits to the city in 1977, she was able to take part in Catalonia's first pride demonstration. At the time when she was exiled, she decided that she did not want to return to the sex trade, and in the end, she went to live in Paris, where she found work performing in a nightclub, which allowed her to dedicate herself to show business, and which for ten years led her to live in various places in France, Belgium and Switzerland. She stopped working in 2003 and returned to Barcelona, never to live anywhere else again.

Over the decades, Reyes was detained all together more than 50 times, for her manner of dressing, behaving or even walking, at first under the law on dangerousness and social rehabilitation, and after that was repealed, under the law on public scandal, which was in force until 1988. In the jails, detention centres and social rehabilitation centres, she suffered much humiliation and mistreatment; These acts of repression, along with the forced exile that was imposed on her, made her join the petition to the Government of Spain for compensation for the harm done by the Franco dictatorship. Of the economic indemnities demanded by homosexuals and transsexuals who had been imprisoned by Francisco Franco's régime – which were not forthcoming until 2009 – Reyes received €7,500.

Reyes died on 22 May 2024 in Barcelona at the age of 75.

== Recognition ==
In 2017, Reyes participated in the Jezebel Productions' documentary Bones of Contention about LGBTQ repression during the Franco era in Spain. The film premiered in the 2017 Berlin Film Festival and was released in Spain under the title PERO QUE TODOS SEPAN QUE NO HE MUERTO. She also appeared in the 2019 documentary Crits de llibertat ("Cries of Freedom") together with other LGBT activists from Catalan-speaking regions, among them Jordi Griset, Maria Giralt, Paulina Blanco, Armand de Fluvià and Nazario. Their testaments appear in Extremaduran journalist Raúl Solís's book La doble transición (2019), together with other transsexual women who raised their voices against the Franco régime's and the transition era's repression. In a 2019 interview following the book's presentation at the seat of the Museo Extremeño e Iberoamericano de Arte Contemporáneo (MEIAC), Badajoz's former prison for homosexuals, she stated that "the price for living in freedom has been high, first for prison and later with exile. But it was worth it." Solís, for his part, pointed out that Reyes's return to the former prison had "a high content of poetic justice."

On 28 May 2024, six days after Reyes's death, the Mayor of Barcelona, Jaume Collboni, announced that the well-known transgender activist would be posthumously awarded the city's Medal of Honour. This came after a request from the Republican Left of Catalonia (ERC). Furthermore, the ERC also proposed that the intersection of Enric Granados and Consell de Cent Streets in Barcelona (41°23′17.4″N 2°9′42.7″E) bear her name.
