= Carabanchel Prison =

Former prison in Madrid, Spain

Prisión Provincial de Madrid
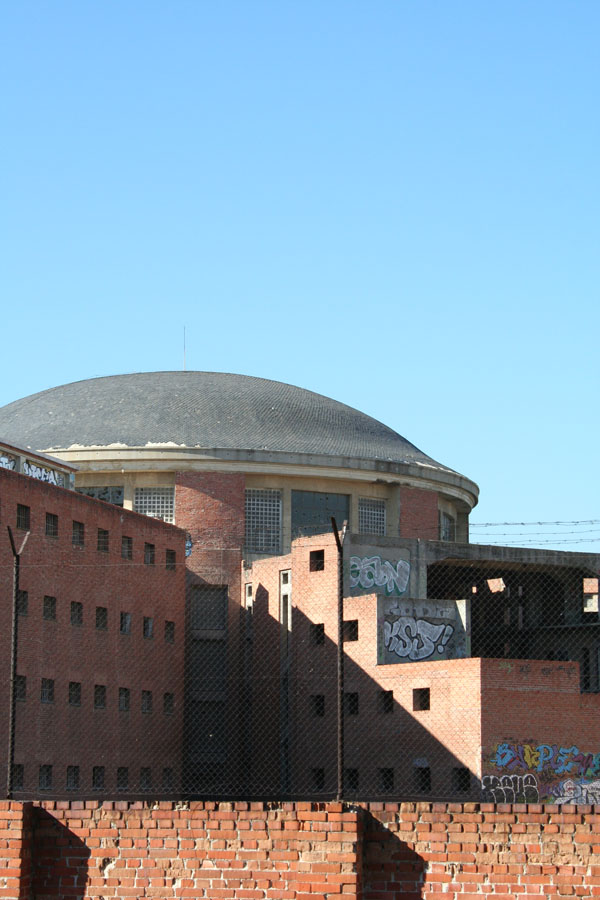
- Interactive map of Prisión Provincial de Madrid
- Location: Carabanchel, Madrid, Spain; 40.3815°N 3.7553°W
- Population: 2,000 men and 500 women (1999)
- Closed: 1998

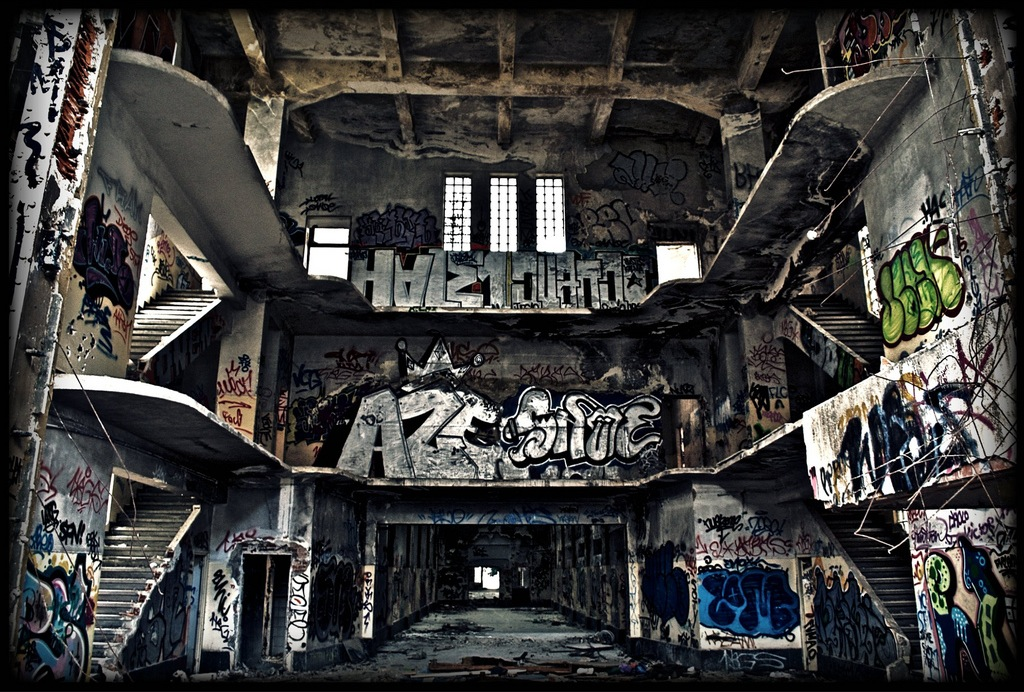
Carabanchel Prison's interior in 2008

Carabanchel Prison (Spanish: Cárcel de Carabanchel) was a prison located in the Carabanchel neighbourhood of Madrid, Spain. It was opened in Francoist Spain in 1944 to house political prisoners after the Spanish Civil War. Carabanchel Prison was one of the biggest prisons in Europe until its closure in 1998 and its demolition in 2008.

== History ==
Carabanchel Prison was constructed between 1940 and 1944 by the Spanish State government of caudillo Francisco Franco using the panopticon model. Many of its inmates were political prisoners arrested after the Spanish Civil War, including members of socialist, anarchist, communist and Marxist political parties and trade union leaders. Notable inmates included Marcelino Camacho (leader of the Comisiones Obreras) and the rest of its top-ranking members as a result of the Process 1001, Julián Ariza (member of the same union), Nicolás Redondo (leader of the Workers' General Union), Eduardo Saborido, Simón Sánchez Montero (Communist Party leader who served 25 years in prison), José María Ruiz Gallardón (monarchist opponent of Franco and father of the former Minister of Justice Alberto Ruiz Gallardón), Nicolás Sartorius, Ramón Tamames, Enrique Múgica and Enrique Curiel (communist activists), Miguel Boyer (Spanish Socialist Workers' Party activist and later minister), Fernando Sánchez-Dragó, Miguel Gila, Fernando Savater, Fernando Arrabal, Agustín Rueda, CNT member Luís Andrés Edo and would-be Franco assassins Stuart Christie and Fernando Carballo Blanco. In the mid-1970s, Carabanchel briefly housed transgender activist Silvia Reyes for being a "transvestite" (the then-current term for a trans woman). Colombian cocaine kingpins Jorge Luis Ochoa Vásquez and Gilberto Rodríguez Orejuela were also imprisoned in Carabanchel in the mid-1980s. After Franco's death in 1975, only common criminals and members of the Basque separatist group ETA and other paramilitary groups remained.

The Coordinadora de Presos en Lucha, that struggled for prisoners rights and amnesty during the first years of the Spanish transition to democracy, was founded in the Carabanchel prison. Several prisoners revolts occurred during that time period.

After its abandonment, the building was heavily looted and inhabited by non-Spaniards. Most of the prison walls were covered with graffiti, some of them very elaborate. A lengthy debate took place between the neighbours of Carabanchel and Aluche, who wanted a hospital and other public facilities to be built in the area, and the local authorities, who wanted to privatize the land for housing development. The neighbours also wanted part of the prison to be preserved.

Finally in July 2008, local and national government reached an agreement on the future of the prison lot, projecting to build 650 apartments, a hospital, green zones and government buildings on the former prison grounds. Despite protests, the entire Carabanchel complex was demolished in late 2008.

== Notes ==
- Urban-travel.org @ The Carabanchel Prison, inside shots.
