= Enrique Curiel =

Spanish politician

The Honourable Enrique Curiel
- Born: 15 April 1947; Vigo, Spain
- Died: 2 March 2011 (aged 63); Madrid, Spain
- Education: university of Santiago de Compostela and the Complutense University of Madrid
- Occupation: Politician
- Years active: 1964-2011
- Known for: Marxist politician and orator
- Political party: Communist Party of Spain (1968-88); Spanish Socialist Workers' Party (1990-
- Movement: Marxism
- Father: Luis Curiel, university professor

Enrique Curiel (15 April 1947 - 2 March 2011) was a Spanish politician and member of the Communist Party of Spain and the United Left, who was a Member of the Senate of Spain.

== Early life and education ==
Curiel was born in Vigo to Luis Curiel, an intellectual and French Language professor at the Complutense University of Madrid, and Pilar Curiel (née Alonso) on 15 April 1947. He was privately educated before attending the University of Santiago de Compostela and the Complutense University of Madrid.

== Political activity ==
In 1968, he joined the Communist Party of Spain and was a close friend of Santiago Carrillo. He was arrested on several occasions and viciously persecuted by the Political-Social Brigade, the political secret police of the Franco regime.

He left the CPS in 1988 and joined the Spanish Socialist Workers' Party (PSOE) two years later.

In the 1980s, Curiel was a regular contributor to the Spanish daily newspaper El País.

== Death and legacy ==
He died on 2 March 2011 in Madrid. In his obituary in El País, Rafael Fraguas described Curiel as "Handsome, cordial and affable, more pragmatic than doctrinaire, subtle agitator, endowed with a convincing logic and endowed with an evident charisma, his image was in open contrast with the stereotype of the Stalinist communist - bitter, sectarian and dogmatic - spread by Francoism."
