= Las Ruedas de Ocón =

- Populated place
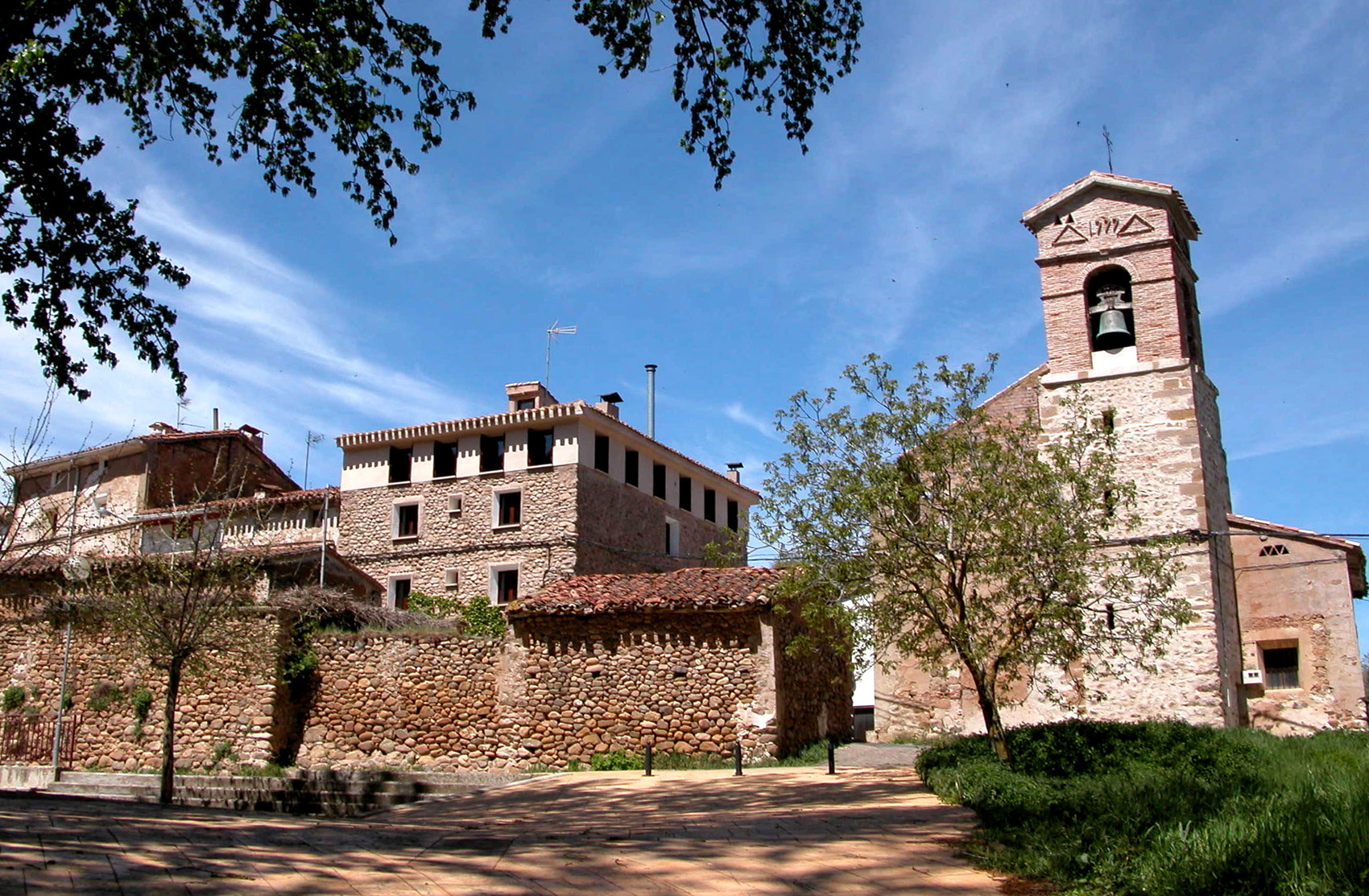
- View of Las Ruedas de Ocón.

- Location within La Rioja, Spain Location within Spain
- Country: Spain
- Autonomous community: La Rioja
- Comarca: Logroño

Population
  - Total: 30
- Postal code: 26145

Las Ruedas de Ocón or just Las Ruedas is a village in the municipality of Ocón, in the province and autonomous community of La Rioja, Spain. As of 2018 had a population of 30 people.
