= Swing rueda =

Type of swing dance

Swing rueda is a swing dance in the round (wheel) that features someone calling Lindy Hop moves and the dancers moving in unison. It was adapted from salsa rueda by Elaine Hewlett and Jeff Miller at The Rhythm Room Dance Studio, Dallas, Texas in 2000.

== The dance ==
- Always maintain the integrity of the circle
- Leaders in general, always rotate through the center of the circle
- Follows end swing outs and many moves by facing the center of the circle
- Leaders are responsible for getting to the next partner on time

Swing Rueda Calls (abbreviated)

- Open Break
- Swing Out - done by default, not usually called
- Dame (1,2,3)
- Inside Turn
- Outside Turn
- Reverse Turn
- Circle
- Texas Tommy (Stop Texas)
- Coca-Cola
- Dame con Dos (clap “& 8”)
- Mini Dip (1.5 Circle)
- Sushi Roll
- Boing Boing
- Circle into Charleston
- Tortilla (Amoeba)
- Right Foot/Left Foot Stomp
- Tostada
- Tostada Dame
- Followers/Leaders Turn In
- Followers/Leaders Stay In
- Tranke
- Boogie Forward
- Boogie Back
- Shorty George
- Slow Motion
- Mess Around
- Freeze
- Itch
- Traffic Jam (NYC calls*)
- Dawn Hampton (NYC)
- Turnstyle (NYC)
- Smear the Bagel (NYC call for Tortilla/Amoeba)
- Toasted Bagel (NYC)
- Plain Bagel (NYC)
- These are a few of the calls from the NYC swing rueda team exhibition at the 2003 San Francisco Swing Dance Festival

== History ==
In 2000, after extensive studying of Salsa in Miami, Jeff Miller and Elaine Hewlett began teaching the famed 1950s Cuban dance called salsa rueda in Dallas, Texas. Rueda is danced in a circle with two or more couples. There is a dancer who calls the moves which the entire circle executes in unison. Some moves require partner changes.

Using the Cuban original as a template, Jeff and Elaine created swing rueda. In the early 2000s they taught swing rueda at multiple dance events in Texas and across the US including Swingout New Hampshire and the Oakland Swing Dance Festival. Since its creation it has spread around the globe, with reports of it traveling to Canada, Europe and Singapore.

== See also ==
- Lindy Hop
- Dance move
