= Rueda, Valladolid =

Coordinates: 41.414°N 4.960°W

Rueda
- Flag Coat of arms

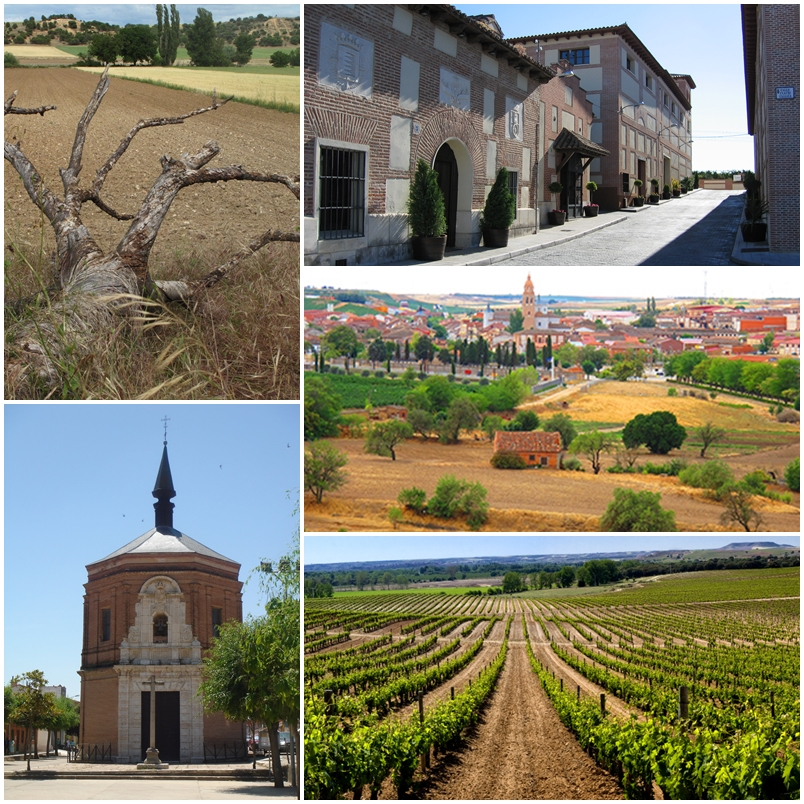
- Images of Rueda, a typical village of the province of Valladolid.
- Country: Spain
- Autonomous community: Castile and León
- Province: Valladolid
- Municipality: Rueda

Area
  - Total: 90 km^{2} (35 sq mi)

Population (2025-01-01)
  - Total: 1,118
  - Density: 14.72/km^{2} (38.1/sq mi)
- Time zone: UTC+1 (CET)
  - Summer (DST): UTC+2 (CEST)

Rueda is a village and municipality in the province of Valladolid, part of the autonomous community of Castile-Leon, Spain.

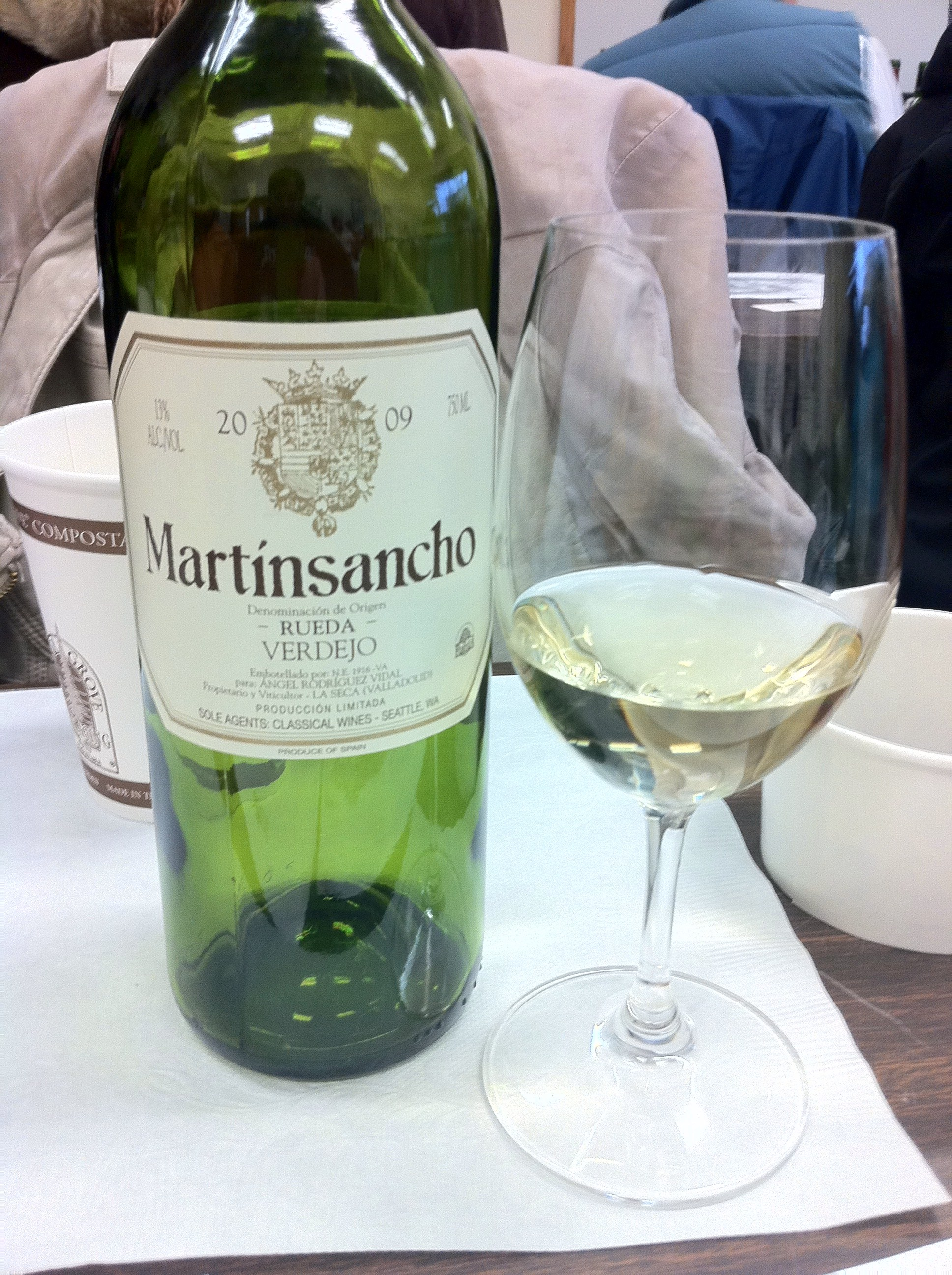
A Verdejo from Rueda (DO).

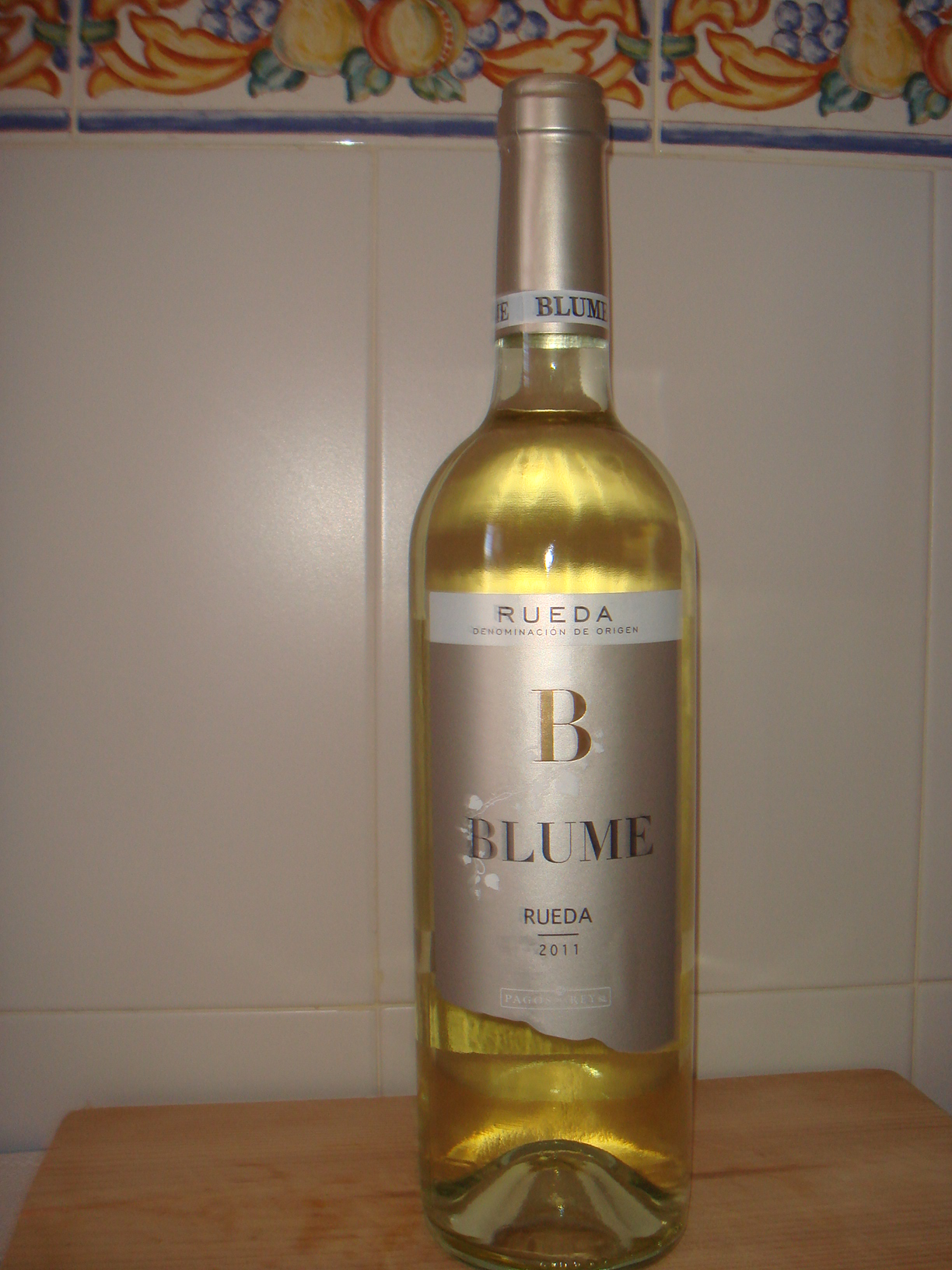
White wine of 2011.

It is located 30 km southwest of the provincial capital, the city of Valladolid. The population is 1.614 This locality is also the center for the wine denomination Rueda (DO).

The region produces white wines made with grape varieties like: Verdejo, Viura, Sauvignon blanc, while the authorised red varieties are Tempranillo, Cabernet Sauvignon, Merlot and Garnacha.

== See also ==
- Rueda (DO)
- Cuisine of the province of Valladolid
