= Torrubia =

Torrubia, Spain
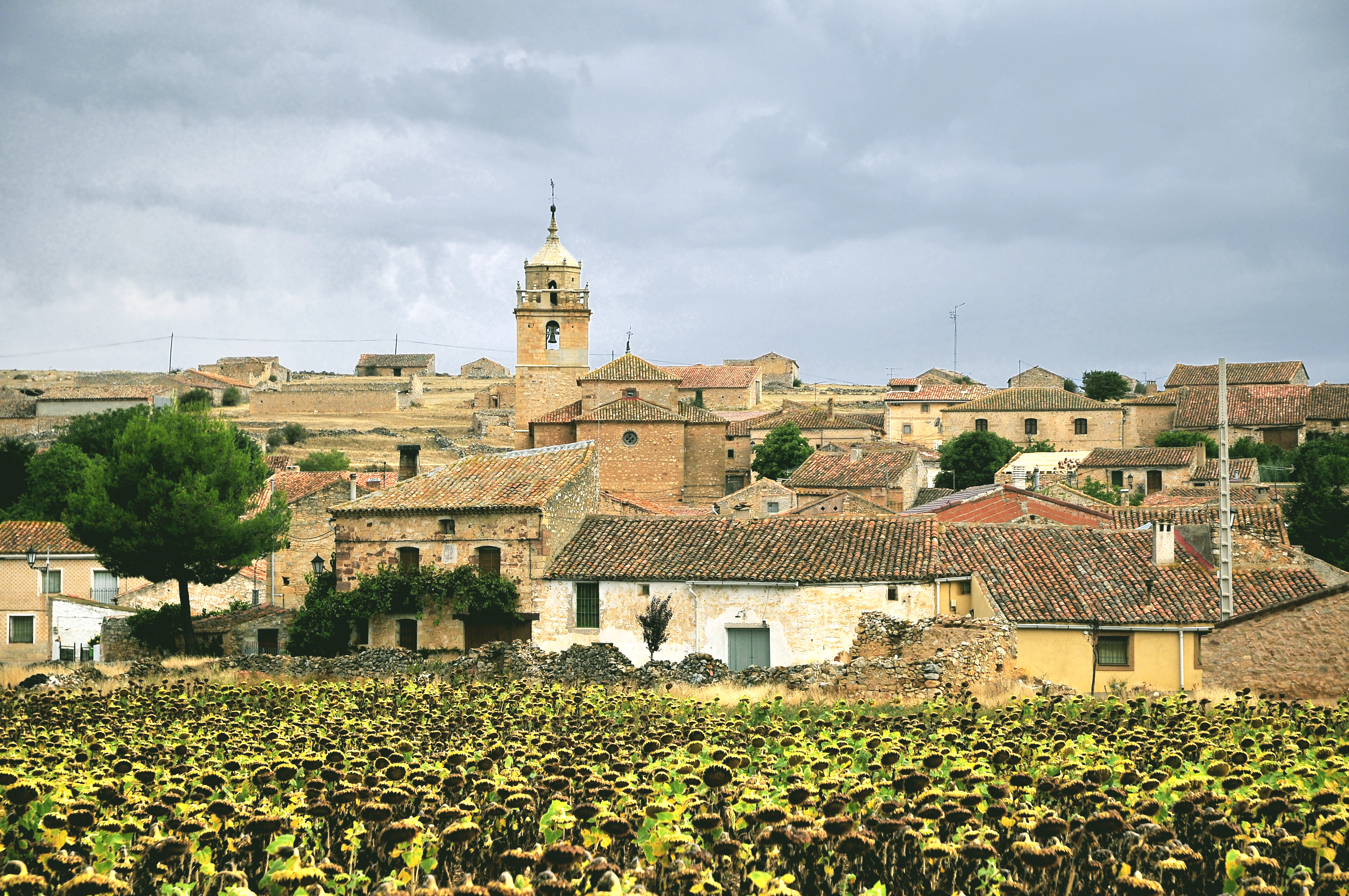

- Location within Province of Guadalajara Location within Castilla-La Mancha Location within Spain
- Coordinates: 40.965°N 1.90056°W
- Country: Spain
- Autonomous community: Castile-La Mancha
- Province: Guadalajara
- Municipality: Torrubia

Area
  - Total: 27 km^{2} (10 sq mi)

Population (2025-01-01)
  - Total: 28
  - Density: 1.0/km^{2} (2.7/sq mi)
- Time zone: UTC+1 (CET)
  - Summer (DST): UTC+2 (CEST)

Torrubia is a municipality located in the province of Guadalajara, Castile-La Mancha, Spain. According to the 2004 census (INE), the municipality has a population of 39 inhabitants.
