= Ramsés Rueda Rueda =

Colombian air force general

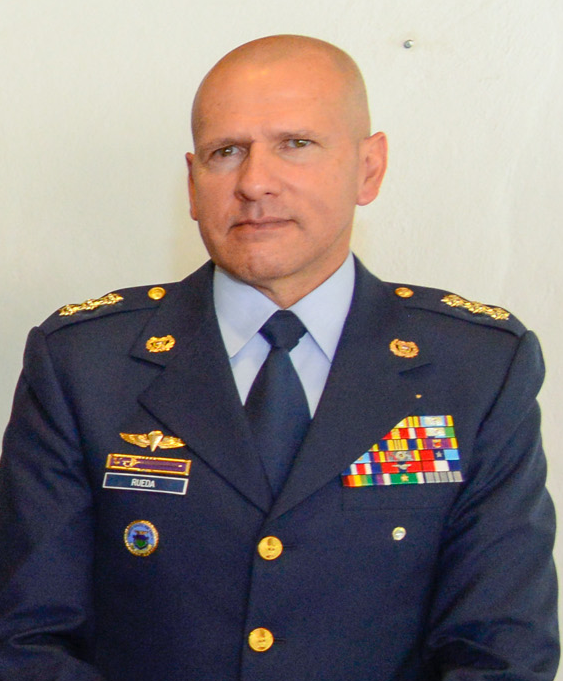

Commander of the Colombian Air Force
- In office 14 December 2018 – 11 Juny 2022
- Preceded by: Carlos Eduardo Bueno
- Succeeded by: Pablo Enrique García

Personal details
- Born: June 25, 1962 (age 63) Socorro

Ramsés Rueda Rueda (born Juny 25, 1962) is a Colombian air force general. He serves as Commander of the Colombian Air Force as of December 2018.
