= Rueda de la Sierra =

Rueda de la Sierra, Spain
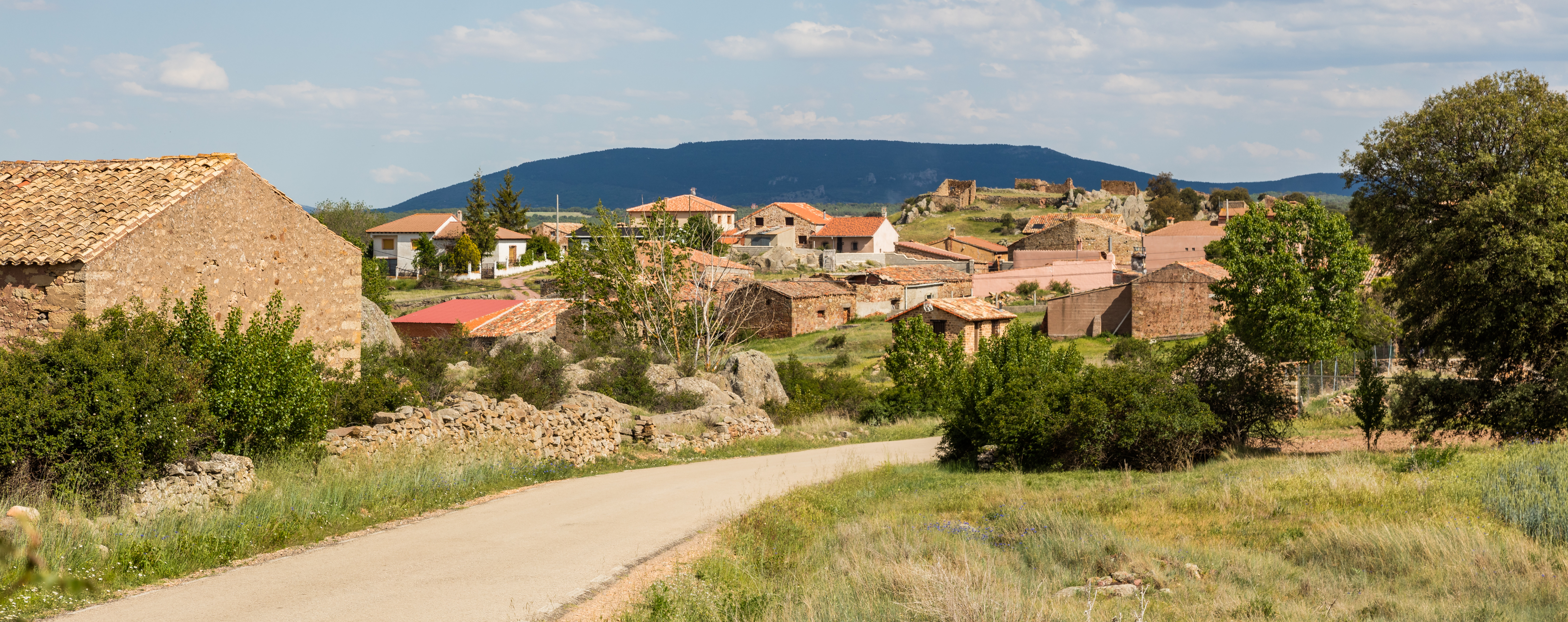

- Location within Province of Guadalajara Location within Castilla-La Mancha Location within Spain
- Coordinates: 40°55′6″N 1°51′16″W
- Country: Spain
- Autonomous community: Castile-La Mancha
- Province: Guadalajara
- Municipality: Rueda de la Sierra

Area
  - Total: 50 km^{2} (19 sq mi)

Population (2025-01-01)
  - Total: 38
  - Density: 0.76/km^{2} (2.0/sq mi)
- Time zone: UTC+1 (CET)
  - Summer (DST): UTC+2 (CEST)

Rueda de la Sierra is a municipality located in the province of Guadalajara, Castile-La Mancha, Spain. According to the 2004 census (INE), the municipality has a population of 58 inhabitants.
