= 15th Gaudí Awards =

Film award ceremony organised by the Catalan Film Academy

- Date: 22 January 2023
- Site: MNAC's Oval Room, Barcelona, Catalonia, Spain
- Hosted by: Llum Barrera
- Organized by: Catalan Film Academy

The 15th Gaudí Awards ceremony, organised by the Catalan Film Academy, was held on 22 January 2023 at the Museu Nacional d'Art de Catalunya's Oval Room. It was hosted by Llum Barrera.

== Background ==
The awards added three new categories, namely that of Best New Director, Best Adapted Screenplay, and a non-gendered acting award for the Best New Performance. The nominations were read by Maria Morera and Roger Casamajor on 14 December 2022 from Auditorium of La Pedrera. In the wake of Agustí Villaronga's death, Catalan Film Academy president Judith Colell announced changes in the gala in order to pay homage to the filmmaker, who helmed signature Catalan pictures such as Black Bread or Uncertain Glory.

== Winners and nominees ==
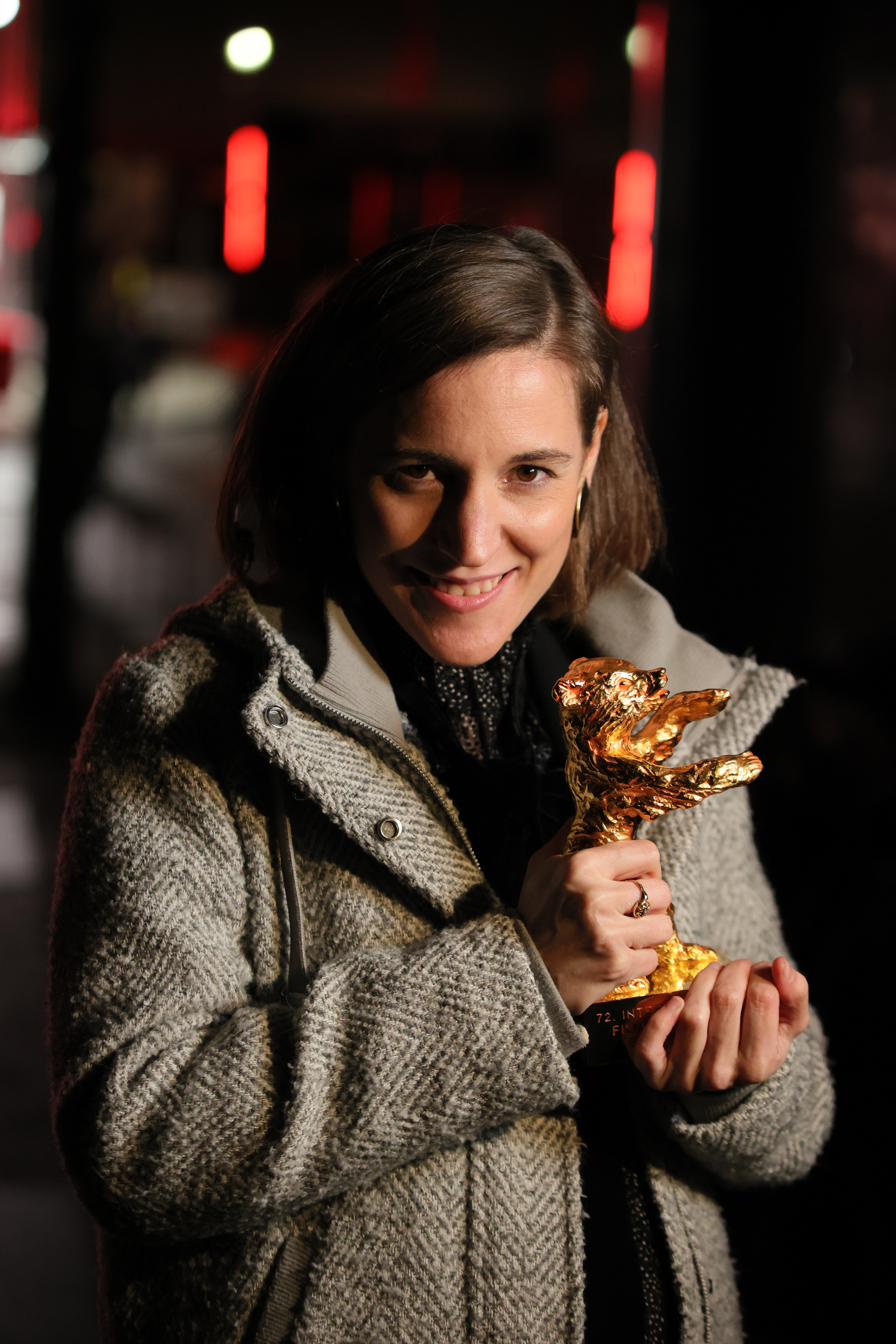
Carla Simón, Best Director winners and Best Original Screenplay co-winner.

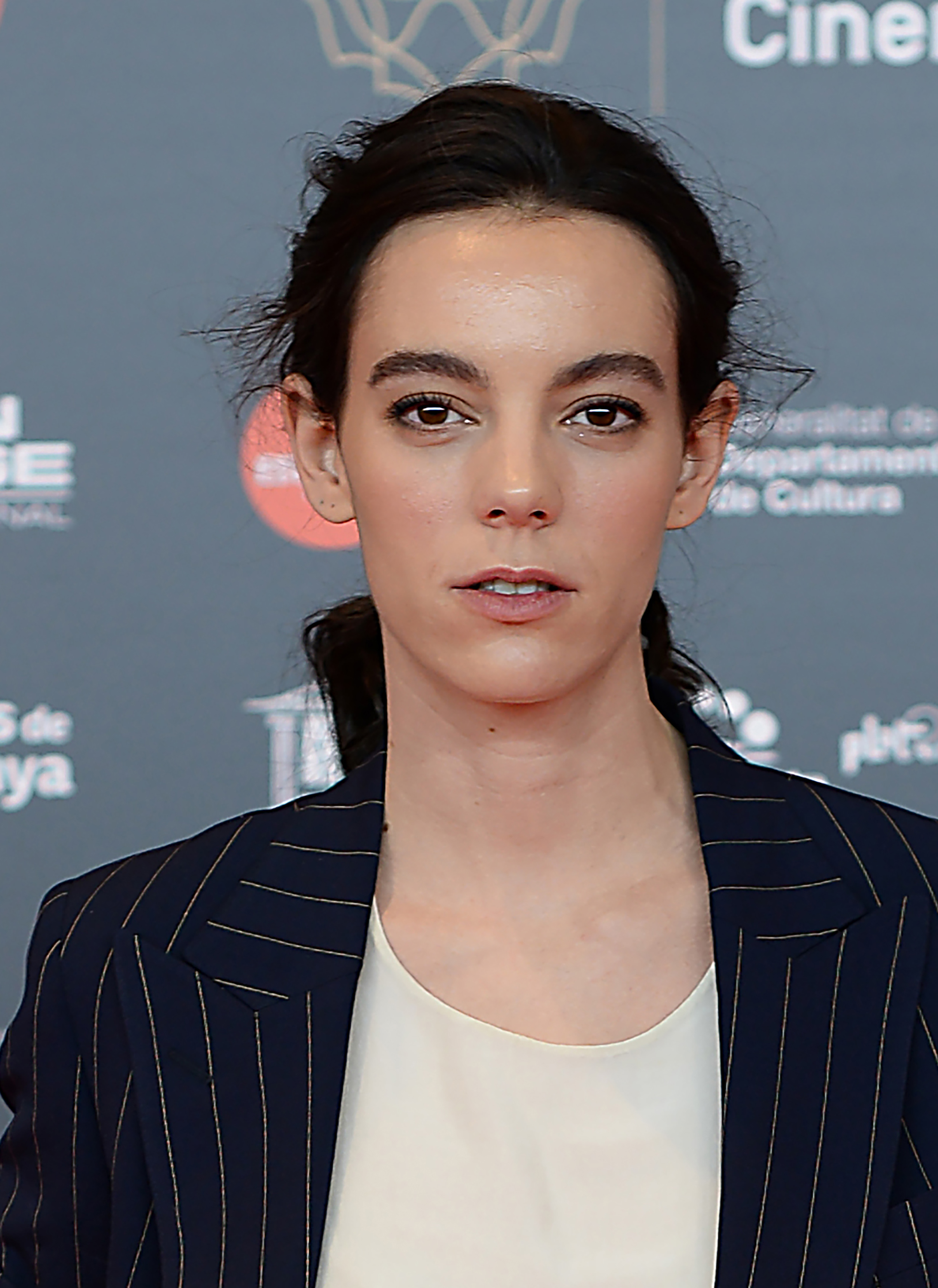
Vicky Luengo, Best Actress winner.

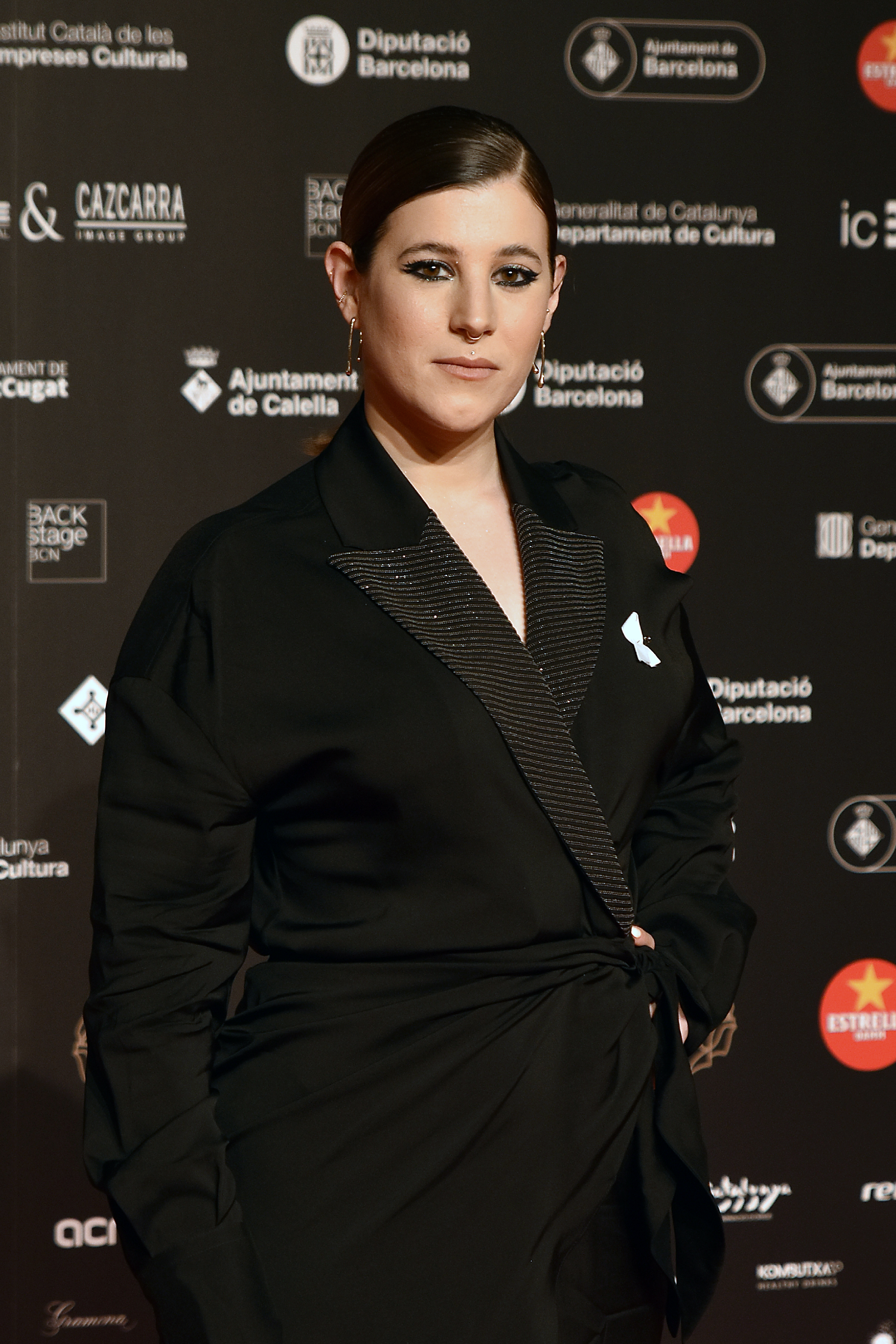
Ángela Cervantes, Best Supporting Actress winner.

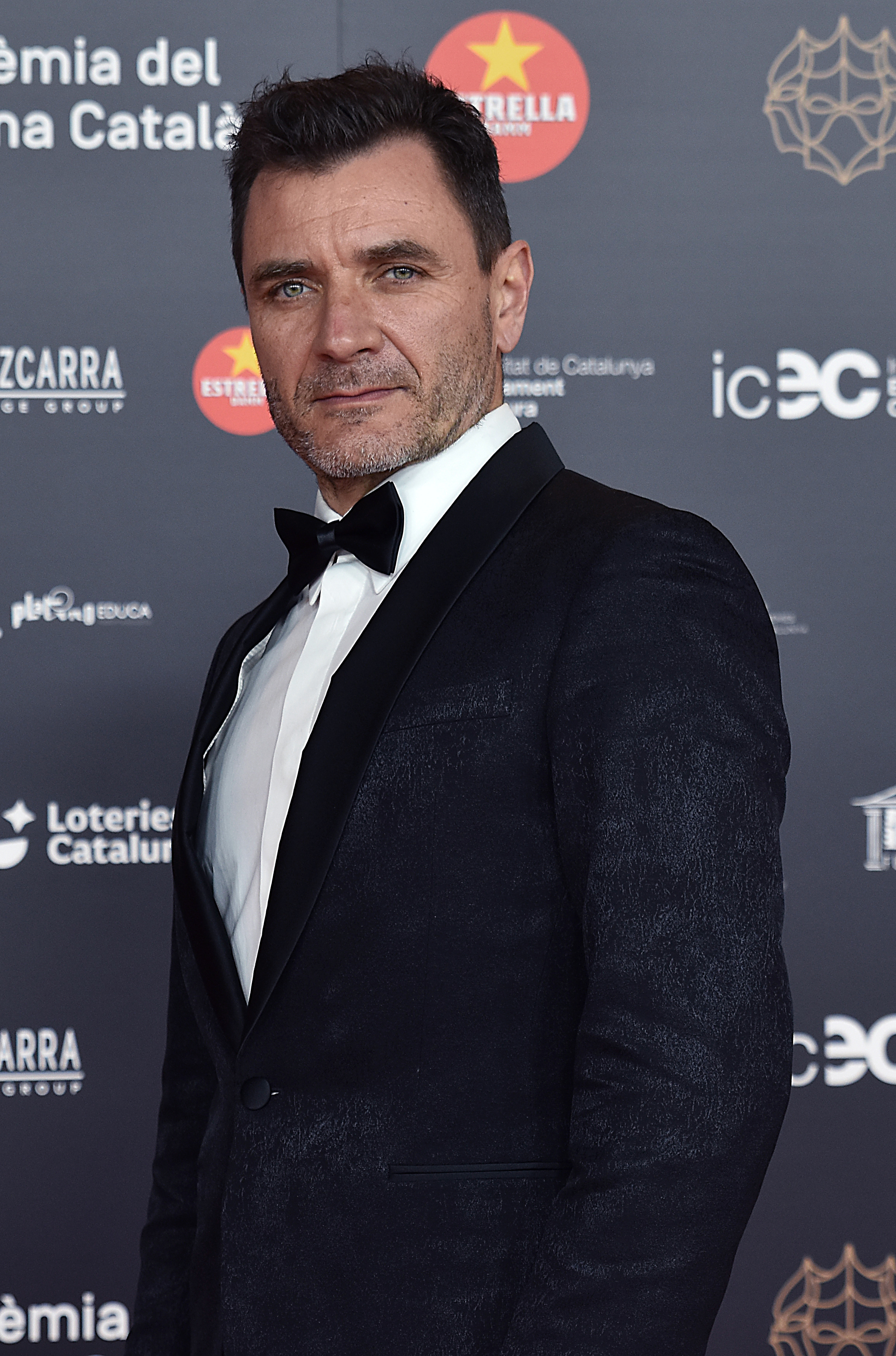
Àlex Brendemühl, Best Supporting Actor winner.

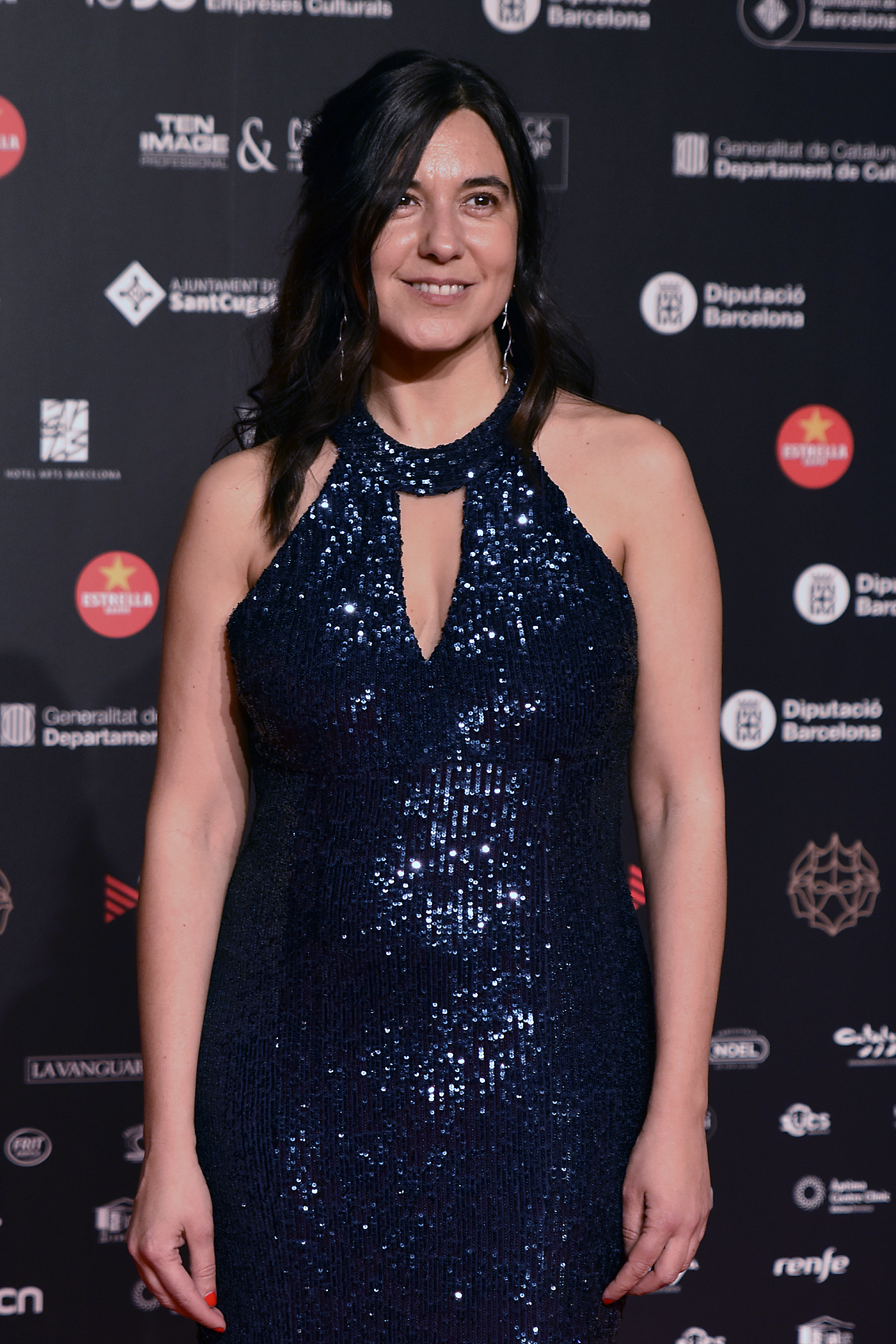
Isa Campo, Best Adapted Screenplay co-winner.

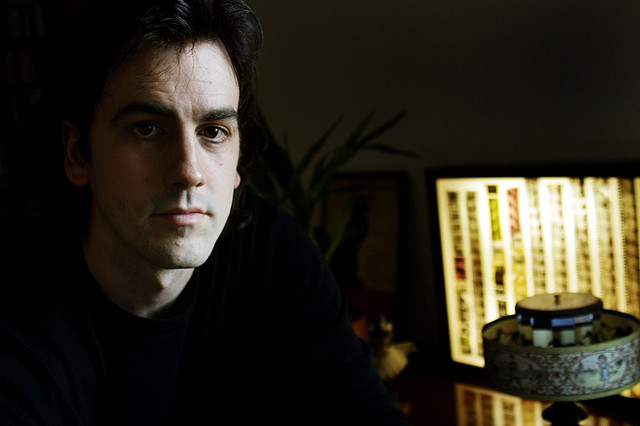
Isaki Lacuesta, Best Adapted Screenplay co-winner.

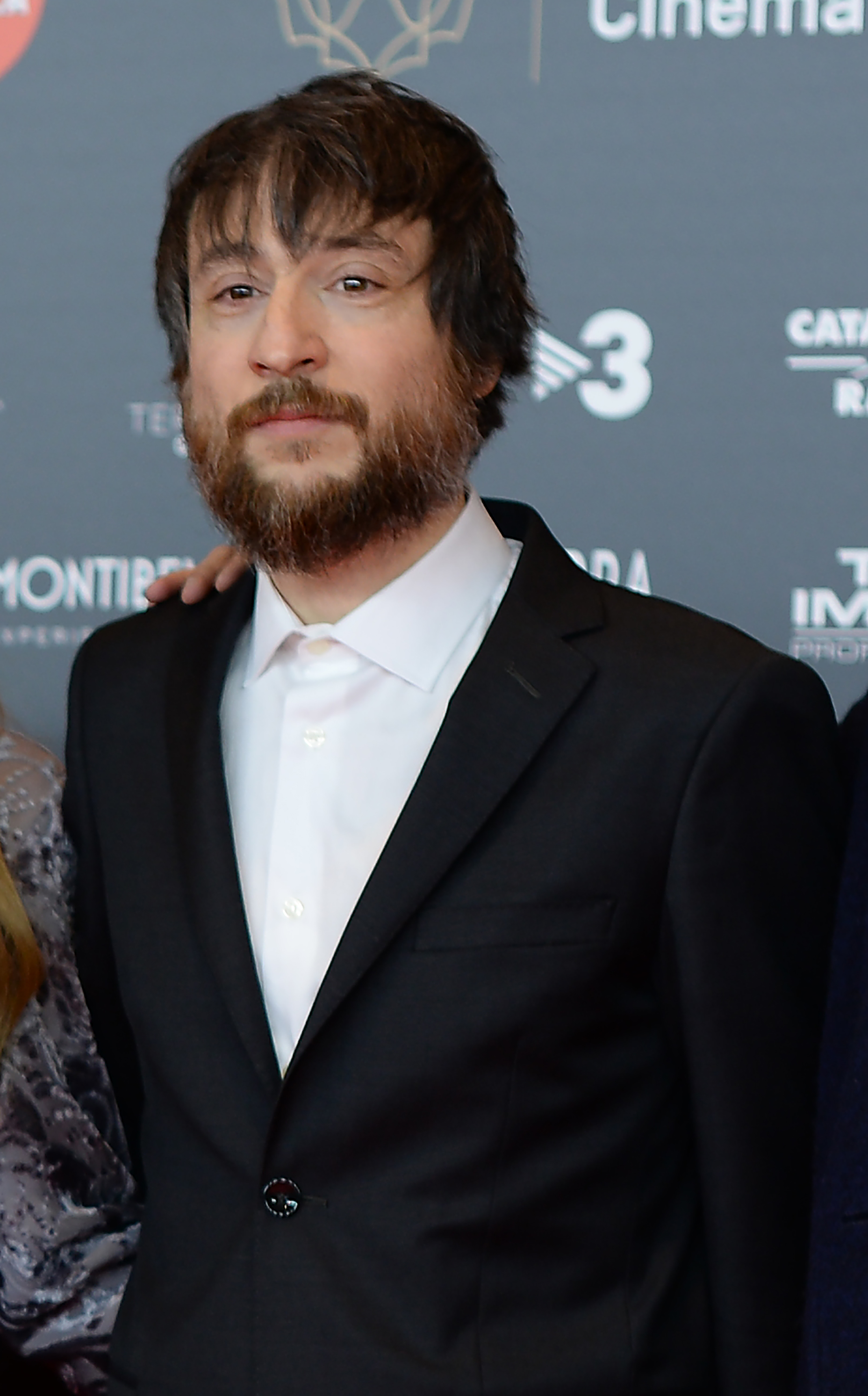
Raül Refree, Best Original Music winner.

The winners and nominees are listed as follows:

Best Film: Alcarràs – Carla Simón, director; Carla Simón, Arnau Vilaró, writers; María Zamora, Stefan Schmitz, Tono Folguera, Sergi Moreno, Oriol Sala-Patau, producers; The Burning Cold – Santi Trullenque, director; Agustí Franch, Santi Trullenque, writers; Sandra Forn, Alfons Teruel, David Ortiz, Oriol Sala-Patau, producers; We Won't Kill Each Other with Guns – María Ripoll, director; Víctor Sánchez, Antonio Escámez, writers; Belén Sánchez, Lina Badenes, producers; Cork – Mikel Gurrea, director; Mikel Gurrea, Francisco Kosterlitz, writers; Laura Rubirola Sala, Tono Folguera, Clàudia Maluenda. Xabier Berzosa, Oriol Sala-Patau, producers	Best Non-Catalan Language Film: Pacifiction – Albert Serra, director and writer; Albert Serra, Montse Triola, Pierre-Olivier Bardet, Dirk Decker, Andrea Schütte, Joaquim Sapinho, Marta Alves, Laurent Jacquemin, producers; One Year, One Night – Isaki Lacuesta, director; Isa Campo, Isaki Lacuesta, Fran Araújo, writers; Isa Campo, Isaki Lacuesta, Ramón Campos, Teresa Fernández-Valdés, Sara Gonzalo, Jerome Vidal; Motherhood – Pilar Palomero, director and writer; Valérie Delpierre, Alex Lafuente, producers; Manticore – Carlos Vermut, director and writer; Alex Lafuente, Pedro Hernández, producers
Best Director: Carla Simón — Alcarràs; Albert Serra — Pacifiction; Isaki Lacuesta — One Year, One Night; Pilar Palomero — Motherhood	Best New Director: Mikel Gurrea — Cork; Avelina Prat — Vasil; Carlota González-Adrio — The House Among the Cactuses; Laura Sisteró — Tolyatti Adrift
Best Original Screenplay: Carla Simón, Arnau Vilaró — Alcarràs; Albert Serra — Pacifiction; Mikel Gurrea, Francisco Kosterlitz — Cork; Pilar Palomero — Motherhood	Best Adapted Screenplay: Isa Campo, Isaki Lacuesta, Fran Araújo — One Year, One Night; Oriol Paulo, Guillem Clua — God's Crooked Lines; Raphaëlle Pérez, Carlos Marques-Marcet, Adrián Silvestre — My Emptiness and I; Víctor Sánchez Rodríguez, Antonio Escámez Osuna — We Won't Kill Each Other with Guns
Best Actress: Vicky Luengo — Cork as Elena; Anna Castillo — Wild Flowers as Julia; Bárbara Lennie — God's Crooked Lines as Alice Gould; Noémie Merlant — One Year, One Night as Céline	Best Actor: Pol López — Cork as Iván; Benoît Magimel — Pacifiction as De Roller; Nahuel Pérez Biscayart — One Year, One Night as Ramón; Oriol Pla Solina — Wild Flowers as Óscar
Best Supporting Actress: Ángela Cervantes — Motherhood as Penélope; Anna Castillo — Stories Not to Be Told as Laura; Berta Pipó — Alcarràs as Glòria; Montse Oró — Alcarràs as Nati	Best Supporting Actor: Alex Brendemühl — Stories Not to Be Told as Luis; Eduard Fernández — God's Crooked Lines as Dr. Samuel Alvar; Enric Auquer — One Year, One Night as Waiter; Josep Abad — Alcarràs as Rogelio
Best New Performance: Carla Quílez — Motherhood as Carla; Albert Bosch — Alcarràs as Roger; Xènia Roset — Alcarràs as Mariona; Zoe Stein — Manticore as Diana	Best Production Supervision: Elisa Sirvent — Alcarràs; Clàudia Robert — Pacifiction; Laia Coll — One Year, One Night as; Mayca Sanz — Cork
Best Documentary Film: El sostre groc – Isabel Coixet, director and producer; Isabel Coixet, Laura Ferrero, writers; Cantando en las azoteas – Enric Ribes, director; Xènia Puiggrós, Enric Ribes, writers; Valérie Delpierre, producer; Oswald. El falsificador – Kike Maíllo, director; Toni Carrizosa, Alberto Aranda, Kike Maíllo, Bernat Saumell, Dani de la Orden, Tian Riba, Jaume Ripoll, Cristian Trepat, Mario Daza, producers; Tolyatti adrift – Laura Sisteró, director; Bernat Manzano, Miguel Ángel Blanco, Valérianne Boué, Cristina Muñoz, producer	Best Short Film: Harta – Júlia de Paz, director; Júlia de Paz, Núria Dunjó, writers; Sergio Grobas, producer; Demà ho deixem – David Moragas, director and writer; David Moragas, Marta Cruañas, producers; El día que volaron la montaña – Alba Bresolí, director; Alba Bresolí, Laia Manresa, writers; Carles Brugueras, Marieke van den Bersselaar, Chloé Atkinson, producers; Solo – Alberto Gross, director; Alberto Gross, Laura Egidos, writers; Laura Egidos, David Aymerich, producers
Best Television Film: Sis nits d'agost – Ventura Durall, director; Jordi Lara, Ventura Durall, writers; Ventura Durall, Paco Poch, Oriol Sala-Patau, producers; Alguns dies d'ahir – Kiko Ruiz Claverol, director; Jordi Casanovas, writer; Xavier Viza, Isabel Vidal, Oriol Sala-Patau, Esther Dueñas, producers; El metralla – Jordi Roigé, director and writer; Jordi Roigé, Laia Roigé, Oriol Sala-Patau, producers	Best Art Direction: Sebastian Vogler — Pacifiction; Isona Rigau Heras — Cork; Laia Colet — One Year, One Night; Sylvia Steinbrecht — God's Crooked Lines
Best Editing: Sergi Dies, Fernando Franco — One Year, One Night; Albert Serra, Artur Tort, Ariadna Ribas — Pacifiction; Ana Pfaff — Alcarràs; Ariadna Ribas — Cork	Best Cinematography: Artur Tort — Pacifiction; Alana Mejía González — Manticore; Daniela Cajías — Alcarràs; Irina Lubtschansky — One Year, One Night
Best Original Music: Raül Refree — One Year, One Night; Andrea Koch — Alcarràs; Clara Aguilar — Cork; Marc Verdaguer, Joe Robinson — Pacifiction	Best Costume Design: Alberto Valcárcel — God's Crooked Lines; Anna Aguilà — Alcarràs; Práxedes de Vilallonga — Pacifiction; Vinyet Escobar — Manticore
Best Sound: Amanda Villavieja, Eva Valiño, Alejandro Castillo, Marc Orts — One Year, One Night; Aitor Berenguer, Laura Díaz, Marc Orts — God's Crooked Lines; Eva Valiño, Thomas Giorgi, Alejandro Castillo — Alcarràs; Leo Dolgan, Xanti Salvador — Cork	Best Visual Effects: Laura Pedro — One Year, One Night; David Blanco — Tad the Lost Explorer and the Emerald Tablet; Lluís Rivera, Alex Villagrasa — God's Crooked Lines; Lluís Rivera, Laura Pedro — Valley of the Dead
Best Makeup and Hairstyles: Montse Sanfeliu, Carolina Atxukarro — God's Crooked Lines; Alma Casal, Virginie Berland, Milou Sanner — One Year, One Night; Aurélie Vigouroux, Maryline Montibert — Pacifiction; Montse Sanfeliu, Jesús Martos — Valley of the Dead	Best European Film: Lullaby; Bergman Island; The Worst Person in the World; Petite Maman
Best Animation Film: Tad the Lost Explorer and the Emerald Tablet – Enrique Gato, director; Manuel Burque, Josep Gatell, writers; Edmon Roch, Ghislain Barrois, Álvaro Augustin, Marc Sabé, Nicolas Matji, Javier Ugarte, producers

=== Honorary Gaudí Award ===
- Jaume Figueras

=== Public Choice's Special Award ===
- Alcarràs
