= God's Crooked Lines =

2022 film by Oriol Paulo

- Theatrical release poster
- Spanish: Los renglones torcidos de Dios
- Directed by: Oriol Paulo
- Screenplay by: Oriol Paulo; Guillem Clua; Lara Sendim
- Based on: Los renglones torcidos de Dios by Torcuato Luca de Tena
- Produced by: Adrián Guerra; Núria Valls; Mercedes Gamero; Ángel Blasco
- Starring: Bárbara Lennie; Eduard Fernández; Loreto Mauleón; Javier Beltrán; Pablo Derqui
- Cinematography: Bernat Bosch
- Edited by: Jaume Martí
- Music by: Fernando Velázquez
- Production companies: Nostromo Pictures; Atresmedia Cine; Filmayer
- Distributed by: Warner Bros. Pictures
- Release dates: 24 September 2022 (SSIFF); 6 October 2022 (Spain)
- Running time: 154 minutes
- Country: Spain
- Language: Spanish
- Budget: €7 million
- Box office: €5.5 million

God's Crooked Lines (Spanish: Los renglones torcidos de Dios) is a 2022 Spanish psychological thriller film directed by Oriol Paulo and starring Bárbara Lennie. Written by Oriol Paulo and Guillem Clua with the collaboration of Lara Sendim, the screenplay is an adaptation of the 1979 novel of the same name by Torcuato Luca de Tena. The plot follows Alice Gould (Lennie), a woman entering a psychiatric ward in order to investigate the mysterious circumstances pertaining to a death in the facility.

The film had its world premiere at the 70th San Sebastián International Film Festival on 24 September 2022 ahead of its 6 October 2023 theatrical opening in Spain. It earned six nominations at the 37th Goya Awards, including Best Leading Actress (Lennie) and Adapted Screenplay.

== Plot ==
In 1979, Alice Gould de Almenara enters a psychiatric ward. Left at the gates by a man, she is interrogated by Dr. Ruipérez, who reads a letter by Dr. Donadío. Alice insists that she has been "legally abducted" by her husband, Heliodoro, so he could seize her riches. Dr. Castell introduces the facility to Alice, who starts doing investigative fieldwork on the death of Dr. Raimundo García del Olmo's son, Damián. Alice (or Alicia) gets acquainted with Ignacio Urquieta and the twins (Rómulo and Remo), as well as the Gnome, a sexual molester protected by the Elephant Man, who shows animosity towards Rómulo. Alice attends sessions led by Dr. Arellano.

Running along the primary timeline, a secondary timeline starts on a rainy night, in which a fire and riot take place and a corpse is found in one of the cells. In this timeline, Urquieta is incriminated by the cops (after which a forensic doctor also comes into action) and later cleared of suspicions.

In the main timeline, Urquieta is interrogated by Alicia about whether he has schizophrenia, the condition Alice believes Damián's killer has. It starts raining, and it becomes evident that Urquieta has an irrational fear of water. Urquieta later reveals that Damián was at odds with the Gnome.

Alicia is hit in the forest by the Gnome, waking up tied to a bed with Arellano telling her she is the presumed killer of the Gnome, although she has trouble remembering what happened after the hit. Alice personally meets Director Samuel Alvar, claiming that she has already exchanged letters with him upon guidance from García del Olmo so she could know how to enter the institution. Alvar denies this. Alicia attacks Alvar and tries to escape, only to be sedated.

Alicia tells Castell her suspicions about Damián's murder and asks for a meeting of the medical council. Alvar claims that Alice has been interned upon recommendation by Donadío on behalf of Heliodoro. She claims that she tricked Ruipérez and feigned a mental illness to enter the facility, telling how she met García del Olmo and set out an investigation to determine what happened to Damián. How García del Olmo gave her instructions that she should feign a condition of paranoia to be able to enter the facility and how they managed to get Donadío to attest to her condition and Heliodoro to sign the permission to withhold her. Alvar says that Alice, offended because the man she chose to marry only wanted her money, tried to kill him by poisoning; Heliodoro, after recovering from a seizure, found Alice hiding poison; and knowing herself caught, she decided to fabricate a private investigator persona.

After failing to identify a man whom Alvar identifies as García del Olmo, Alice is electro-shocked and taken to the Cage, where she becomes convinced that she has been framed by Heliodoro, who hired someone to impersonate García del Olmo. She tells Arellano and Castell that, in case her bank accounts are emptied, there can be a plausible explanation for the behaviour of Heliodoro, Donadío, and Alvar. Castell confirms that Alvar has been overpaid by Heliodoro for Alice's internment. Alicia escapes from her cell and develops a plan to light a fire, while Urquieta frees the rest of the patients. Urquieta finds one of the twins dead in a cell, making it evident that the events of the secondary timeline pertain to the aftermath of Alice's plan. Alicia crosses paths with the forensic doctor, who tells her about Rómulo's death. Alicia knocks her down and impersonates her. She cracks the identity of the twin's killer (the Elephant Man). Cops confirm that Alice's account was emptied.

Castell convenes a meeting of the council to discharge Alice. Alice meets with the living twin and reveals that the dead one is actually Remo. Alvar renounces his vote, while the other four doctors clear Alice. Alvar lets Donadío into the room. To Alice's dismay, Donadío turns out to be the man she identified as García del Olmo.

== Cast ==
- Bárbara Lennie as Alice Gould
- Eduard Fernández as Dr. Samuel Alvar
- Loreto Mauleón as Dra. Montserrat Castell
- Javier Beltrán as Dr. César Arellano
- Pablo Derqui as Ignacio Urquieta
- Samuel Soler as Rómulo / Remo
- Federico Aguado as Dr. Teodoro Ruipérez
- Adelfa Calvo as Dra. Bernardos
- Antonio Buil Pueyo as Superintendent Ruiz de Pablos
- Dafnis Balduz as Inspector Soto
- David Selvas as Heliodoro
- Francisco Javier Pastor as the Elephant Man
- Luis Sacristán as the Gnome
- Lluís Soler as Man / Fake Del Olmo / Dr. Donadío
- Alba Jubany as Niña Oscilante
- Raquel Ferri as Coroner Lucia
- Joan Crosas as García del Olmo
- Chus Leiva as Enfermera Jaula Leones

== Production ==
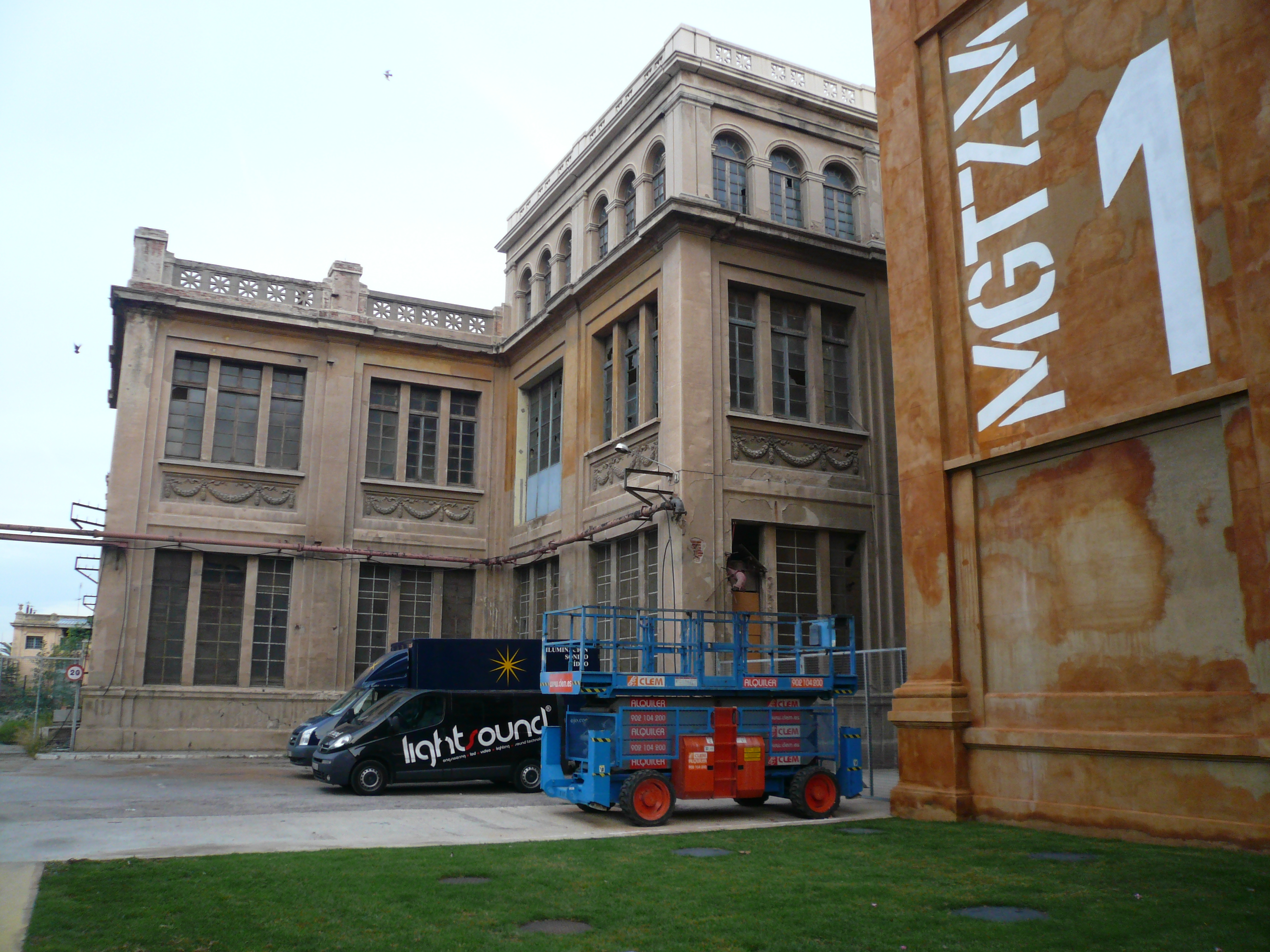
Tarragona's Tabacalera

The film was produced by Nostromo Pictures, Atresmedia Cine, and Filmayer. Written by the director Oriol Paulo alongside Guillem Clua and Lara Sendim, the screenplay of God's Crooked Lines is the second film adaptation of Torcuato Luca de Tena Brunet's 1979 best-selling novel Los renglones torcidos de Dios, after Tulio Demicheli's 1983 Mexican adaptation Los renglones torcidos de Dios. Production began when Atresmedia Cine and Warner Bros., who had the rights to the novel, approached Paulo in June 2019, when he was about to start filming The Innocent. He had read it when he was 14 years old after his grandmother, an avid reader of mystery novels, recommended it to him. Paulo was initially hesitant to accept the offer because the novel had a universe that was too broad for him. His approval of their offer came six months later after rereading the novel and developing fascination with the main character, Alice Gould, whom he described as an "upper-class woman, so brutal, so intelligent and with such a verbal argumentative ability."

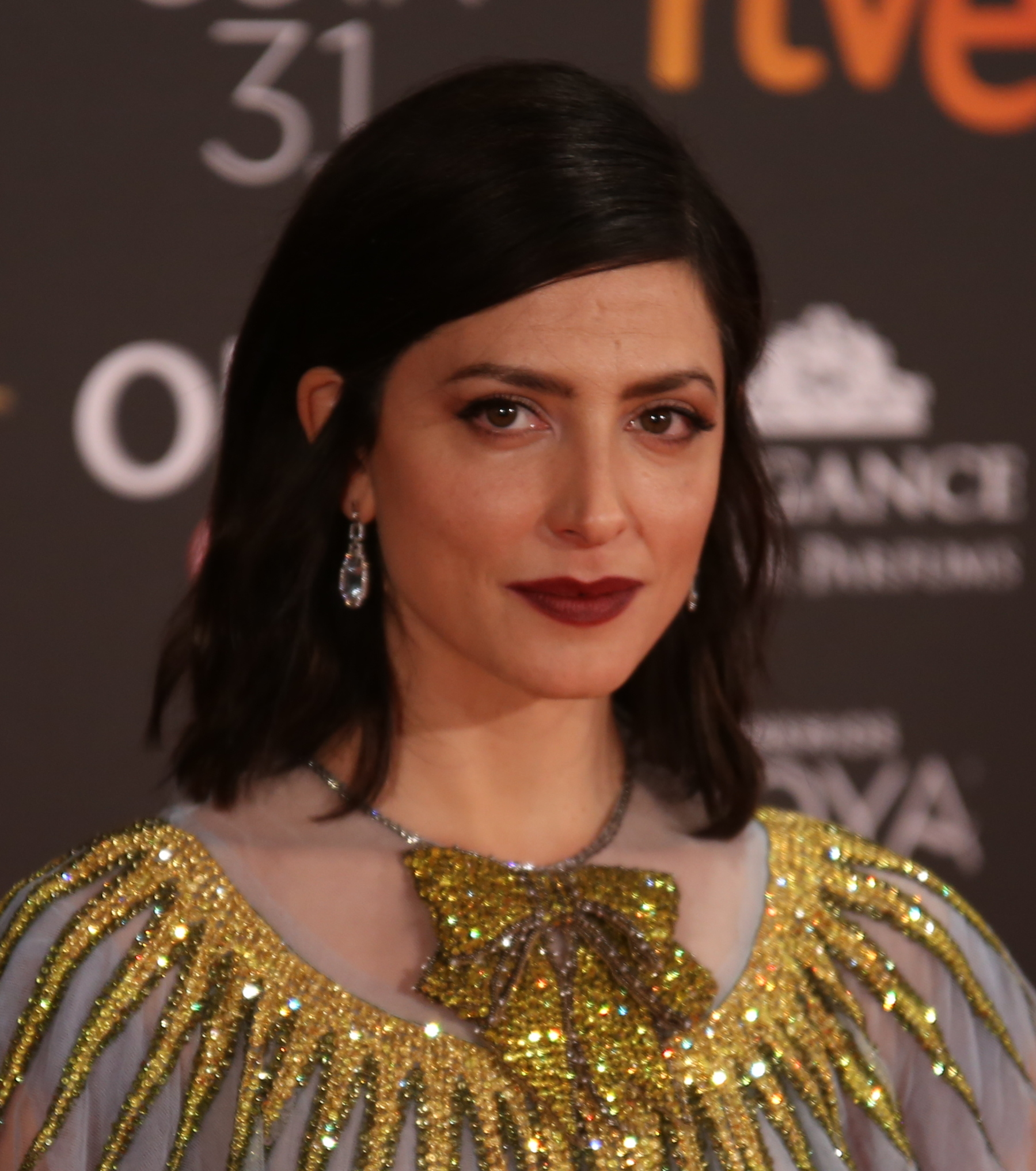
Bárbara Lennie, the lead actress. She described Alice as one of her most complex roles and referred to it as "a heroine and antihero at the same time".

Paulo worked with co-screenwriter Guillem Clua to make improvisations on the story and adapt the novel into a film. They had to make the audience fit in with the 1970s environment of the novel, such as by making the language sound more contemporary, and eliminate parts of the novel that they found unimportant. The practice of insulin shock therapy, which is in the novel, was replaced by electroconvulsive therapy due to its cruelty; besides, it was already considered so even in the times of its publication. Paulo said that the film could have been a horror or a social drama, but he was requested to make it a psychological thriller because of his interest in the genre. Along with co-producer Ángel Blasco, he collected information about Torcuato from the author's family and met several psychiatrists for advice and supervision on the script. In order to understand what sanatoria were like in the 1970s, photographs from archives and film libraries were used.

The lead actors are Bárbara Lennie and Eduard Fernández. Lennie, whose mother was one of the psychiatrists to whom the production team consulted, played Alice Gould. It is the character of a woman who enters a mental institution by claiming that she is investigating a crime that has happened there. Paulo stated that while rereading the novel, he visualised Lennie in the role of Alice, whom he found having many qualities that the character has, among which are intelligence and mental agility, and being the only suitable actress to play it. She read the novel for a week and agreed to star in the film in September 2020; he immediately thought of Fernández as her co-star. Fernández portrayed Samuel Alvar, the director of the psychiatric hospital, and prepared himself by conversing with psychiatrists. Paulo described the pair as "two forces with a lot of egoism, a lot of character and who bring the tension of the book to the screen." Newcomer Samuel Soler played the dual roles of Rómulo and Remo, and digital effects were used to make it possible.

The production team watched several old films for inspiration on how a film was shot back then, including Shock Corridor (1963) for the rain scenes. With a budget of €7 million, the filming lasted for nine weeks, starting in May and ending in August 2021. It was shot in several locations in the provinces of Tarragona and Barcelona, including Terrassa, with Bernat Bosch as the cinematographer. The old Tabacalera building built in 1923 in Tarragona and a former Mercedes car plant in Barcelona were used to portray the psychiatric hospital. They respectively stood in for the hospital for the outdoor and indoor scenes. Antonio Valcárcel was the costume designer; describing his part as "one of the most satisfying jobs of his career," he had to design clothes that would match the high-class sphere to which Alice belongs and also the austerity of the 1970s psychiatric centre, which required him and Paulo considerable investigation owing to the scarcity of documentation at the time. Fernando Velázquez worked as a composer, whereas Jaume Martí was responsible for film editing.

== Release ==
The film was presented in the Perlak section of the 70th San Sebastián International Film Festival in September 2022. It was originally scheduled to be released theatrically in Spain on 7 October 2022 by Warner Bros. Pictures España. The theatrical release date was later moved forward one day to 6 October 2022. After a two-month theatrical window, it was released on Netflix on 9 December 2022. By the time of its streaming debut, it was the third highest-grossing Spanish film of 2022 at the domestic box office, with an in-year gross of around €5.5 million.

== Reception ==
On the review aggregator website Rotten Tomatoes, 77% of 13 critics' reviews are positive, with an average rating of 6.5/10.

Rubén Romero Santos of Cinemanía rated the film 3½ out of 5 stars, deeming it to be "a thrilling and elegant" exercise of narrative shell gaming. Beatriz Martínez of El Periódico de Catalunya rated the film 4 out of 5 stars, considering that "the intrigue finds a perfect balance between stylization and magnetism" and also praising the "titanic" adaptation work, "in which not only the language is cleaned and distilled, but also the stale substratum from the novel with a touch of pop aestheticism." Raquel Hernández Luján of HobbyConsolas rated the film with 50 out of 100 points ('so-so'), considering that it fails at respecting the heart of the novel (the dignification of the mentally ill and the value put on the work of the staff), praising the art direction and costume design while negatively assessing the direction of actors and the overextended footage achieved by a number of consecutive closures. Juan Pando of Fotogramas rated the film 3 out of 5 stars, considering that it is "the kind of film that attracts viewers to the theatres and does not disappoint them", while noting that its footage could have been trimmed and its outcome simplified.

Paula Vázquez Prieto of La Nación concluded, "With modest ambitions and a clear goal of entertainment, [the film] fits into the narrative without much originality but with the necessary rhythm to embrace all its pieces in each new turn that the revelations offer." Marshall Shaffer of Decider wrote, "The ambiguities of God's Crooked Lines only serve to inspire ambivalence. Flashes of intrigue and undeniable intentionality will undeniably draw in some patient viewers. But the film does not make a strong enough case for how much effort it would take to come to one's answer to the unresolved ending by untangling the web of competing narratives."

In regard to the writing, Javier Ocaña of El País commented that while the original ending of the novel has been slightly modified, the film "remains faithful to the novel". Hernández Luján was disappointed that the film reveals too much of its main plot in the beginning and has an unnecessarily complicated storyline, adding that the film is enjoyable only if the viewer has not read the novel version yet. Federico Marín Bellón of ABC wrote negatively about Paulo's intention of modernising the language. Reviewing for El Mundo, Luis Martínez wrote that the film "ignores the real and almost forced possibility of turning the plot into a metaphor or the text into a context", concluding that it is "an obsessive and delirious thriller." According to Vázquez Prieto, the film fails to give a surprising plot twist after "the 'crazy' adventures of [the lead actors'] characters on their backs".

Marín Bellón applauded Lennie for showing her versatility as an actress and delivering a flawless performance, noting the mysterious atmosphere that she brought to her role. Romero Santos praised the entire cast, calling Lennie outstanding. Similarly, Avinash Ramachandran of The New Indian Express opined that Lennie "owns the screen" and the other actors are "stunning in equal measures." Juan Orellana of ElDebate.com believed that without her presence, "the splendour of an iron script and the effectiveness of a Cartesian montage would be of little use", and the mysteriousness of her character was well portrayed by her. Pando positively compared Lennie's portrayal of Alice to those of Peter Breck's reporter Johnny Barrett in Shock Corridor and Leonardo DiCaprio's policeman Edward Daniels in Shutter Island (2010).

=== Top ten lists ===
The film appeared on a number of critics' top ten lists of the best Spanish films of 2022:

- 7th — Vanity Fair (Juan Sanguino and Paloma Rando)
- 7th — El Cultural (Juan Sardá)
- 9th — El Español ('Series & Más' critics)

== Accolades ==
| Year | Award | Category | Nominee(s) | Result | Ref. |
|---|---|---|---|---|---|
| 2023 | 15th Gaudí Awards | Best Actress | Bárbara Lennie | Nominated | |
| 2023 | 15th Gaudí Awards | Best Supporting Actor | Eduard Fernández | Nominated | |
| 2023 | 15th Gaudí Awards | Best Adapted Screenplay | Oriol Paulo, Guillem Clua | Nominated | |
| 2023 | 15th Gaudí Awards | Best Art Direction | Sylvia Steinbrech | Nominated | |
| 2023 | 15th Gaudí Awards | Best Costume Design | Alberto Valcárcel | Won | |
| 2023 | 15th Gaudí Awards | Best Makeup and Hairstyles | Montse Sanfeliu, Carolina Atxukarro | Won | |
| 2023 | 15th Gaudí Awards | Best Visual Effects | Lluís Rivera, Alex Villagrasa | Nominated | |
| 2023 | 15th Gaudí Awards | Best Sound | Aitor Berenguer, Laura Díaz, Marc Orts | Nominated | |
| 2023 | 10th Feroz Awards | Best Soundtrack | Fernando Velázquez | Nominated | |
| 2023 | 10th Feroz Awards | Best Trailer | Pedro J. Bernardo | Nominated | |
| 2023 | 78th CEC Medals | Best Actress | Bárbara Lennie | Nominated | |
| 2023 | 78th CEC Medals | Best Adapted Screenplay | Oriol Paulo, Guillem Clua, Lara Sendim | Won | |
| 2023 | 78th CEC Medals | Best Music | Fernando Velázquez | Nominated | |
| 2023 | 37th Goya Awards | Best Actress | Bárbara Lennie | Nominated | |
| 2023 | 37th Goya Awards | Best Adapted Screenplay | Guillem Clua, Oriol Paulo | Nominated | |
| 2023 | 37th Goya Awards | Best Original Score | Fernando Velázquez | Nominated | |
| 2023 | 37th Goya Awards | Best Art Direction | Sylvia Steinbrecht | Nominated | |
| 2023 | 37th Goya Awards | Best Costume Design | Alberto Valcárcel | Nominated | |
| 2023 | 37th Goya Awards | Best Makeup and Hairstyles | Montse Sanfeliu, Carolina Atxukarro, Pablo Perona | Nominated | |
| 2023 | 31st Actors and Actresses Union Awards | Best Film Actress in a Leading Role | Bárbara Lennie | Nominated | |

== See also ==
- List of Spanish films of 2022
