= Proxies (2026 film) =

- Promotional release poster
- Spanish: En nombre de otro
- Directed by: Oriol Paulo
- Screenplay by: Oriol Paulo; Guillem Clua
- Starring: Eduard Fernández; Mario Casas; Blanca Suárez; Nicolás Francella; Alexandra Jiménez
- Cinematography: Bernat Bosch
- Music by: Fernando Velázquez
- Production company: Juanita Films
- Distributed by: Netflix
- Release date: 11 December 2026
- Country: Spain
- Language: Spanish

Proxies (Spanish: En nombre de otro, lit. 'on other's behalf') is an upcoming Spanish thriller film directed by Oriol Paulo and co-written by Guillem Clua. It stars Eduard Fernández, Mario Casas, Blanca Suárez, Nicolás Francella, and Alexandra Jiménez

== Plot ==
It is set on Christmas Eve. After a man enters a police precinct and declares himself guilty of the murder of two or three people, the confession becomes intertwined with a hitherto closed case.

== Cast ==
- Eduard Fernández
- Mario Casas
- Blanca Suárez
- Nicolás Francella
- Alexandra Jiménez
- Blanca Parés
- Javier Beltrán
- Marta Bayarri
- Ana Wagener

== Production ==
The screenplay was written by Oriol Paulo and Guillem Clua. The film was produced by Juanita Films. It was shot in locations of Catalonia, including the downtown of Reus, that stood in for fictional settings in Barcelona.

== Release ==
Proxies is set to debut on Netflix on 11 December 2026.

== See also ==
- List of Spanish films of 2026
