= Cork (film) =

- Catalan film poster
- Catalan: Suro
- Directed by: Mikel Gurrea
- Screenplay by: Mikel Gurrea; Francisco Kosterlitz
- Starring: Vicky Luengo; Pol López; Ilyass El Ouahdani
- Cinematography: Julián Elizalde
- Production companies: Lastor Media; Malmo Pictures; Irusoin
- Distributed by: A Contracorriente Films
- Release dates: 19 September 2022 (Zinemaldia); 2 December 2022 (Spain)
- Country: Spain
- Language: Catalan

Cork (Catalan: Suro) is a 2022 Spanish rural drama film directed by Mikel Gurrea which stars Vicky Luengo and Pol López alongside Ilyass El Ouahdani. It is shot in Catalan.

== Plot ==
Set in rural Catalonia, the plot follows a couple (Elena and Iván) who moves from the city to the countryside to run an inherited cork plantation, involving as outsiders in the escalating tension between local and immigrant cork workers.

== Cast ==
- Vicky Luengo as Elena
- Pol López as Iván
- Ilyass El Ouahdani as Karim

== Production ==
Gurrea's debut feature, the project was developed at the San Sebastián's Ikusmira Berriak 2016 Residency, Sources2 and the Sam Spiegel Film Lab. The screenplay was penned by Gurrea alongside Francisco Kosterlitz.

Laia Costa was originally a cast choice for one of the leads, but eventually Vicky Luengo was cast as the protagonist. The film was produced by Lastor Media alongside Malmo Pictures and Irusoin, with the participation of TV3, EiTB, and funding from ICAA, ICEC, and support from Creative Europe's MEDIA. It was shot in Catalan in Darnius and other locations of the province of Girona such as Maçanet de Cabrenys, Agullana, Figueres, and the Albera Massif (Alt Empordà), with, in addition to the three leads, a cast consisting of non-professional actors, primarily cork workers. Shooting started on 19 July 2021.

== Release ==
The film was selected for screening at the 70th San Sebastián International Film Festival's main competition, where it was presented on 19 September 2022. Distributed by A Contracorriente Films, it was theatrically released in Spain on 2 December 2022. London-based international sales company REASON8 closed distribution deals with Tamasa Distribution for distribution in French-speaking Europe, J&J Films for Dutch-speaking Benelux, Encripta for Latin America, and HBO CEE for Central and Eastern Europe.

== Reception ==
Jonathan Holland of ScreenDaily wrote that the film "tells its tale unfussily and efficiently, with few stylistic flourishes".

=== Accolades ===
Year	Award	Category	Nominee(s)	Result	Ref.
2022	70th San Sebastián International Film Festival	Irizar Basque Film Award		Won	
2022	70th San Sebastián International Film Festival	Fipresci Award		Won	
2022	70th San Sebastián International Film Festival	Euskal Gidoigileen Elkartea Award		Won	
2022	18th Zurich Film Festival	Best International Feature Film		Nominated	
2023	15th Gaudí Awards	Best Film		Nominated	
2023	15th Gaudí Awards	Best New Director	Mikel Gurrea	Won	
2023	15th Gaudí Awards	Best Actress	Vicky Luengo	Won	
2023	15th Gaudí Awards	Best Actor	Pol López	Won	
2023	15th Gaudí Awards	Best Original Screenplay	Mikel Gurrea, Francisco Kosterlitz	Nominated	
2023	15th Gaudí Awards	Best Production Supervision	Mayca Sanz	Nominated	
2023	15th Gaudí Awards	Best Art Direction	Isona Rigau Heras	Nominated	
2023	15th Gaudí Awards	Best Editing	Ariadna Ribas	Nominated	
2023	15th Gaudí Awards	Best Original Score	Clara Aguilar	Nominated	
2023	15th Gaudí Awards	Best Sound	Leo Dolgan, Xanti Salvador	Nominated	
2023	37th Goya Awards	Best New Director	Mikel Gurrea	Nominated	
2023	37th Goya Awards	Best Actress	Vicky Luengo	Nominated	

== See also ==
- List of Spanish films of 2022
