= Stories Not to Be Told =

- Theatrical release poster
- Spanish: Historias para no contar
- Directed by: Cesc Gay
- Screenplay by: Cesc Gay; Tomás Aragay
- Produced by: Marta Esteban
- Starring: Alex Brendemühl; Anna Castillo; José Coronado; Chino Darín; Antonio de la Torre; Verónica Echegui; Brays Efe; Quim Gutiérrez; Alexandra Jiménez; María León; Nora Navas; Alejandra Onieva; Javier Rey; Eva Reyes; Maribel Verdú; Javier Cámara
- Cinematography: Andreu Rebés
- Edited by: Liana Artigal
- Music by: Arnau Bataller
- Production companies: Imposible Films; Nocontarfilm AIE
- Distributed by: Filmax
- Release dates: 10 September 2022 (TIFF); 25 November 2022 (Spain)
- Running time: 100 minutes
- Country: Spain
- Language: Spanish

Stories Not To Be Told (Spanish: Historias para no contar) is a 2022 Spanish comedy film directed by Cesc Gay. Consisting of 5 stories, the film features an ensemble cast with Anna Castillo, Quim Gutiérrez, Verónica Echegui, Brays Efe, Alex Brendemühl, Javier Rey, Antonio de la Torre, José Coronado, Maribel Verdú, María León, Chino Darín, Alexandra Jiménez, and Nora Navas, among others.

== Plot ==
Reportedly displaying an "acerbic, yet tongue-in-cheek tone" according to Gay, the plot tracks five different stories concerning the characters' personal relationships.

== Cast ==
- Anna Castillo as Laura
- Antonio de la Torre as Carlos
- Maribel Verdú as Blanca
- José Coronado as Andrés
- Quim Gutiérrez as Edu
- Javier Rey as Raúl
- Verónica Echegui as Sofía
- Àlex Brendemühl as Luis
- María León as Ana
- Chino Darín as Álex
- Alejandra Onieva as Bárbara
- Brays Efe as Jota
- Alexandra Jiménez as Carol
- Nora Navas as Ángela
- Eva Reyes as Sandra
- Javier Cámara as David

== Production ==
The screenplay of Historias para no contar (Cesc Gay's ninth feature film) was penned by Gay along recurring co-scribe Tomás Aragay. Produced by Impossible Films alongside Nocontarfilm and with the participation of RTVE, Movistar+ and TVC, and funding from ICAA, ICEC, Triodos Bank and ICO, the film reportedly has a budget over €3.5 million. Shooting had already begun in Barcelona by March 2021. Filming had already wrapped by May 2021.

== Release ==
The film had its world premiere at the 47th Toronto International Film Festival in September 2022. It was also picked up for the 'Gala RTVE' slate of the 70th San Sebastián International Film Festival. Distributed by Filmax, it was set for a 28 October 2022 theatrical release in Spain, later postponed to 25 November 2022.

== Reception ==
Jonathan Holland of ScreenDaily considered that rather than delivering something daring or subversive (as the title may suggest), Gay "seems to have locked the door to his comfort zone and thrown away the key", assessing that while "Gay at half throttle is never less than enjoyable", the film's dialogues are "not always as sharp as they think they are".

== Accolades ==
Year	Award	Category	Nominee(s)	Result	Ref.
2023	15th Gaudí Awards	Best Supporting Actress	Anna Castillo	Nominated	
2023	15th Gaudí Awards	Best Supporting Actor	Alex Brendemühl	Won	

== See also ==
- List of Spanish films of 2022
