= Anna Castillo =

Spanish actress (born 1993)

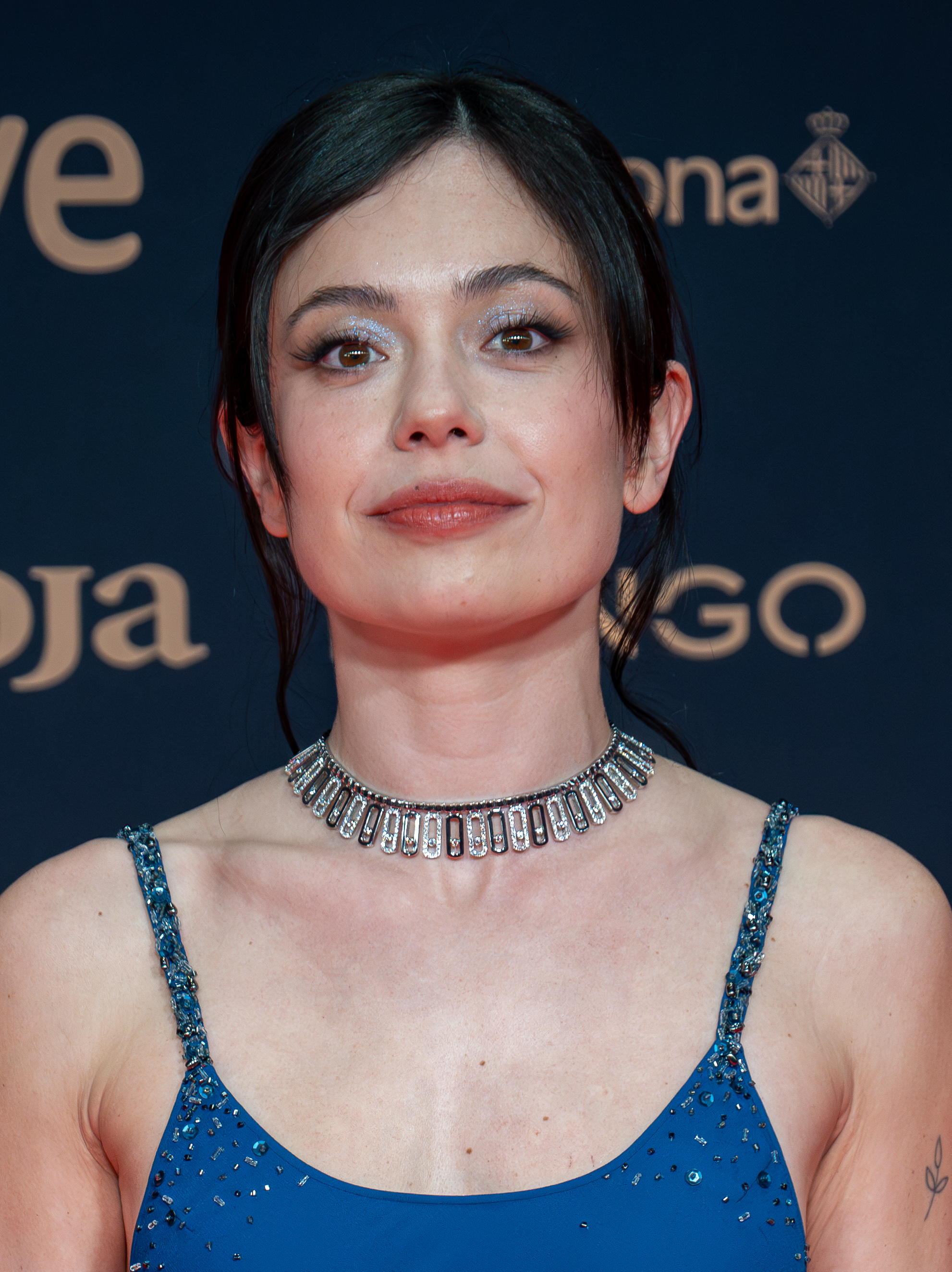
- Castillo in 2026
- Born: Anna Castillo Ferré; 9 October 1993 (age 33); Barcelona, Catalonia, Spain
- Occupations: Actress; singer
- Years active: 2005–present

Anna Castillo Ferré (born 9 October 1993) is a Spanish actress. Her film breakthrough came with the role of Alma in the drama The Olive Tree (2016) for which she won a Goya Award for Best New Actress.

== Biography ==
Anna Castillo Ferré was born in Barcelona on 9 October 1993. From the age of seven, Castillo enrolled into various acting schools in Barcelona and Madrid, later studying at Saint Joan Bosco Horta Secondary School from which she graduated in 2011. Between 2005 and 2011, she was part of the music group sp3, in which she was a singer and dancer. After the group retired from public performances they become part of the television show Família dels Súpers on TV3 from 2011 to 2014.

Castillo's acting debut was in 2009 on the television movie El enigma Giarcomo, on TV3, in which she played the role of Maiana. She made her feature film debut in Elena Trapé's Blog (2010). In 2016, Castillo starred as Alma in The Olive Tree, a role for which she won the Goya Award for Best New Actress, portraying a granddaughter desperate to retrieve her beloved grandfather's olive tree in the hope that it will awaken him from his vegetative state.

In 2023, Castillo landed a main role in the romantic comedy series A Perfect Story and later that year, she starred as Mia in survival thriller film Nowhere. In 2024, she was reported to have been cast alongside Ester Expósito in Carlota Pereda's vampire dramedic thriller television series Death to Love. She also was announced to lead the cast of the comedy series Su majestad to portray Pilar, a young princess and future Queen of Spain.

== Filmography ==
=== Film ===
Year	Title	Role	Notes	Ref.
2010	Blog	Bea		
2012	Promoción fantasma (Ghost Graduation)	Ángela		
2016	El olivo (The Olive Tree)	Alma		
2017	La llamada (Holy Camp!)	Susana Romero		
2017	Oro (Gold)	La Parda		
2018	Viaje al cuarto de una madre (Journey to a Mother's Room)	Leonor		
2020	Adú	Sandra		
2020	La vida era eso (That Was Life)	Verónica		
2021	Donde caben dos (More the Merrier)	Clara		
2021	Mediterráneo (Mediterraneo: The Law of the Sea)	Esther		
2022	Historias para no contar (Stories Not to Be Told)	Laura		
2022	Girasoles silvestres (Wild Flowers)	Julia		
2023	El fantástico caso del Golem (The Fantastic Golem Affairs)	María		
2023	Nowhere	Mia		
2023	No voy a pedirle a nadie que me crea (I Don't Expect Anyone to Believe Me)	Laia		
2024	Escape	Abril		
2025	Wolfgang (Extraordinari) (Wolfgang)	Mia		
2026	Mi querida señorita (My Dearest Señorita)	Isabel		
2026	Chica y lobo (Girl and Wolf)	Paula	Voice	

=== Television ===
Year	Title	Role	Notes	Ref.
2012	Doctor Mateo	Sara	12 episodes	
2012	Chessboxing	Elisa	10 episodes	
2014	La caída de Apolo	Laura		
2011–14	Club Super 3	Ana	26 episodes	
2013–16	Amar es para siempre	Dorita Pastor	Seasons 1–3	
2016	Web Therapy	Iria de la Villa	Episode: "1.14"	
2016	El ministerio del tiempo	Sonia Lombardi	Episode: "Tiempo de lo oculto"	
2016–19	Paquita Salas	Belén de Lucas	Seasons 1–3	
2017–18	Estoy vivo	Susana Vargas	Seasons 1–2	
2018	Arde Madrid	Pilar		
2020	Vamos Juan	Montse	1 episode	
2020	La línea invisible	Txiki	Miniseries	
2022	Fácil (Simple)	Nati		
2023	Un cuento perfecto (A Perfect Story)	Margot		
since 2025	Su majestad	Pilar		
2026	Se tiene que morir mucha gente (Many People Need to Die)	Bárbara		

== Accolades ==
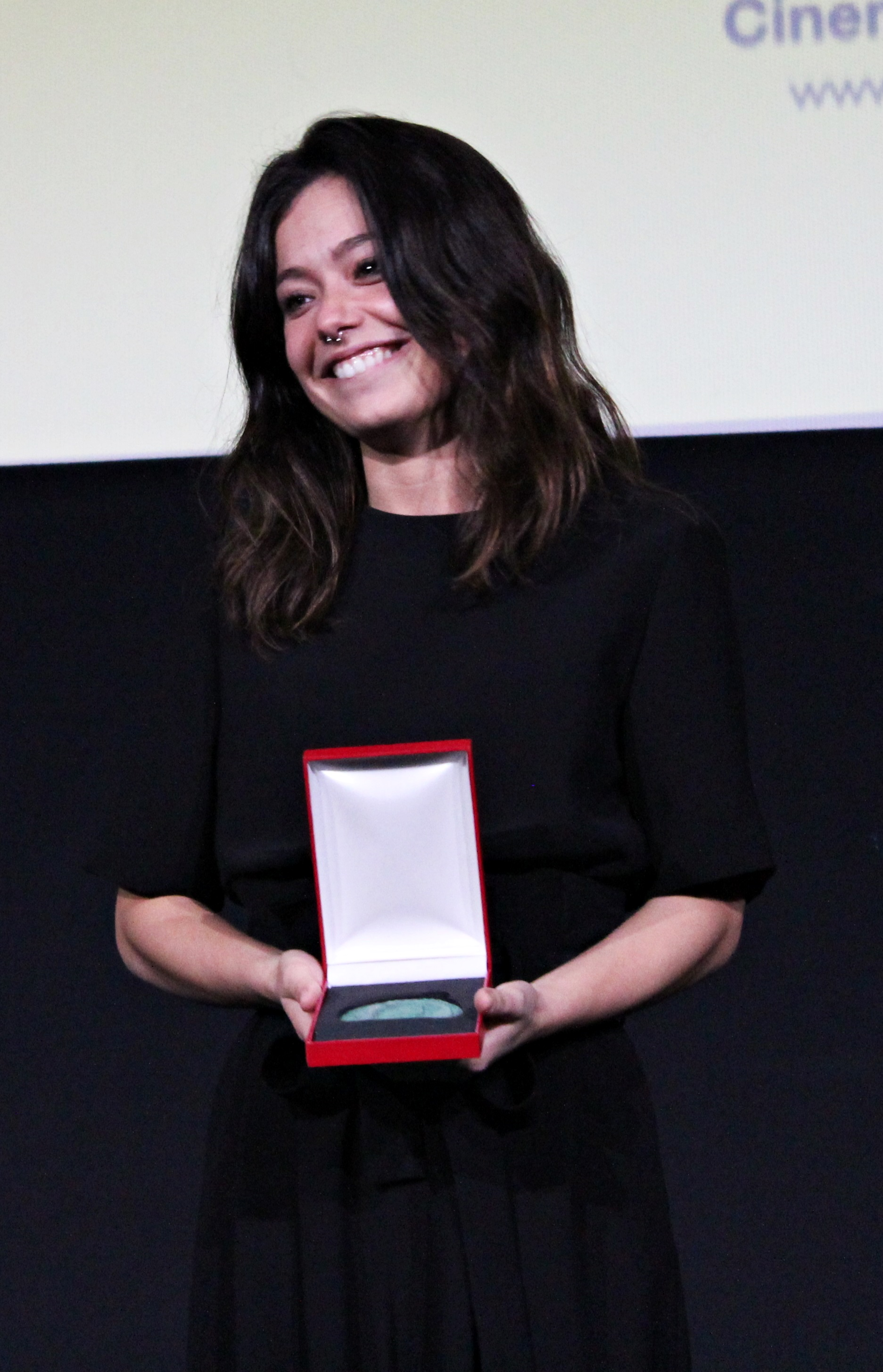
Castillo receiving a CEC Medal in 2019 for her supporting performance in Journey to a Mother's Room

Year	Award	Category	Work	Result	Ref.
2017	22nd Forqué Awards	Best Actress	The Olive Tree	Nominated	
2017	4th Feroz Awards	Best Actress	The Olive Tree	Nominated	
2017	72nd CEC Medals	Best New Actress	The Olive Tree	Won	
2017	31st Goya Awards	Best New Actress	The Olive Tree	Won	
2017	26th Actors and Actresses Union Awards	Best New Actress	The Olive Tree	Nominated	
2017	26th Actors and Actresses Union Awards	Best Television Actress in a Minor Role	Paquita Salas	Nominated	
2018	23rd Forqué Awards	Best Actress	Holy Camp!	Nominated	
2018	5th Feroz Awards	Best Supporting Actress in a Film	Holy Camp!	Nominated	
2018	73rd CEC Awards	Best Supporting Actress	Holy Camp!	Nominated	
2018	10th Gaudí Awards	Best Supporting Actress	Holy Camp!	Nominated	
2018	32nd Goya Awards	Best Supporting Actress	Holy Camp!	Nominated	
2019	6th Feroz Awards	Best Supporting Actress in a Series	Arde Madrid	Won	
2019	6th Feroz Awards	Best Supporting Actress in a Film	Journey to a Mother's Room	Won	
2019	11th Gaudí Awards	Best Supporting Actress	Journey to a Mother's Room	Won	
2019	74th CEC Awards	Best Supporting Actress	Journey to a Mother's Room	Won	
2019	33rd Goya Awards	Best Supporting Actress	Journey to a Mother's Room	Nominated	
2019	28th Actors and Actresses Union Awards	Best Television Actress in a Secondary Role	Arde Madrid	Won	
2019	6th Platino Awards	Best Actress in a Miniseries or TV series	Arde Madrid	Nominated	
2022	9th Feroz Awards	Best Supporting Actress in a Film	That Was Life	Nominated	
2022	14th Gaudí Awards	Best Supporting Actress	Mediterraneo: The Law of the Sea	Nominated	
2022	30th Actors and Actresses Union Awards	Best Film Actress in a Secondary Role	That Was Life	Nominated	
2022	28th Forqué Awards	Best Film Actress	Wild Flowers	Nominated	
2022	28th Forqué Awards	Best TV Actress	Simple	Nominated	
2023	15th Gaudí Awards	Best Supporting Actress	Stories Not to be Told	Nominated	
2023	15th Gaudí Awards	Best Actress	Wild Flowers	Nominated	
2023	10th Feroz Awards	Best Actress in a Film	Wild Flowers	Nominated	
2023	37th Goya Awards	Best Actress	Wild Flowers	Nominated	
2024	25th Iris Awards	Best Actress	Simple	Nominated	
2025	12th Feroz Awards	Best Supporting Actress in a Film	Escape	Nominated	
2026	13th Feroz Awards	Best Main Actress in a Series	Su majestad	Nominated	
2026	27th Iris Awards	Best Actress	Su majestad	Nominated	
2026	34th Actors and Actresses Union Awards	Best Film Actress in a Minor Role	Wolfgang	Nominated	
2026	32nd Forqué Awards	Best Actress in a Series	Many People Need to Die	Pending	
