= The Communion Girl =

- Theatrical release poster
- Spanish: La niña de la comunión
- Directed by: Víctor Garcia
- Screenplay by: Guillem Clua
- Story by: Alberto Marini; Víctor Garcia
- Produced by: Mercedes Gamero; Edmon Roch
- Starring: Carla Campra; Aina Quiñones; Marc Soler; Carlos Oviedo
- Cinematography: José Luis Bernal
- Edited by: Clara Martínez Malagelada
- Music by: Marc Timón
- Production companies: Ikiru Films; La Terraza Films; La Niña de la Comunión AIE; Atresmedia Cine
- Distributed by: Warner Bros. Pictures
- Release dates: 14 October 2022 (Sitges); 10 February 2023 (Spain)
- Country: Spain
- Language: Spanish
- Box office: €1.4 million

The Communion Girl (Spanish: La niña de la comunión) is a 2022 Spanish horror film directed by Víctor Garcia from a screenplay by Guillem Clua based on an original story by Garcia and Alberto Marini. It stars Carla Campra, Aina Quiñones, Marc Soler, and Carlos Oviedo.

== Plot ==
In May 1987, friends Sara and Rebe are in their way back home from a night out with recreational drugs following the first communion of Sara's younger sister Judith. They find a doll on the road.

== Cast ==
- Carla Campra as Sara
- Aina Quiñones as Rebeca 'Rebe'
- Olimpia Roch as Judith
- Marc Soler as Pedro
- Carlos Oviedo as Chivo
- Maria Molins as Amparo
- Xavi Lite as Antonio
- Anna Alarcón as Remedios
- Victor Solé as Santiago
- Sara Roch as Marisol
- Daniel Rived as Tano

== Production ==
The film is Víctor Garcia's Spanish-language debut feature after a career primarily developed in American B movies. The screenplay was penned by Guillem Clua, based on an original story by Alberto Marini and Garcia. The film is an Ikiru Films, La Terraza Films, La Niña de la Comunión AIE, and Atresmedia Cine production. Shooting locations included Corbera d'Ebre.

== Release ==
The film was presented at the 55th Sitges Film Festival on 14 October 2022. Distributed by Warner Bros., the film was theatrically released in Spain on 10 February 2023. It grossed €413,363 (59,004 admissions) at the Spanish box office in its opening weekend.

== Reception ==
According to the American review aggregation website Rotten Tomatoes, The Communion Girl has a 50% approval rating based on 6 reviews from critics, with an average rating of 6.80/10.

Juan Pando of Fotogramas rated The Communion Girl 4 out of 5 stars, considering it to be one of those films in which the lack of ambition is their best virtue, praising the "authentic" characters.

Sergio F. Pinilla of Cinemanía rated the film 3½ stars, deeming it to be an "effective [instance of] domestic terror".

Beatriz Martínez of El Periódico de Catalunya rated the film 4 out of 5 stars, assessing that it handles "few elements, but in a very precise and solid way".

Javier Ocaña of El País assessed that good choices abound in The Communion Girl pertaining pre-production, production, shooting, and post-production but the film languishes at the basics: story, screenplay, and denouement.

== See also ==
- List of Spanish films of 2023
