= The Innocent (Coben novel) =

2005 novel by Harlan Coben

- First edition (UK)
- Author: Harlan Coben
- Language: English
- Genre: Mystery, thriller
- Published: 2005
- Publisher: E. P. Dutton (US); Orion Books (UK)
- Publication place: United States
- Media type: Print (hardback, paperback)
- Pages: 439

The Innocent is the seventh stand-alone novel by American crime writer Harlan Coben. It was first published in 2005.

== Plot summary ==
Matt Hunter is a seemingly ordinary man in suburban New Jersey with a pregnant wife, Olivia. His past is not so ordinary. In his late teens, he tried to break up a fight involving his friend, and wound up unintentionally killing the other fighter. While his friends spent time in college, Matt was behind bars serving time for negligent manslaughter. Now, nine years after being released from prison, Matt is a paralegal in his brother's law firm and his life is looking up. However, the past won't seem to go away. As Matt and Olivia try to buy a house in his old neighborhood, neighbors and local authorities make it clear he is not welcome. After Matt receives disturbing photos from his wife's phone, a man who is tailing him ends up dead. Matt soon learns that Olivia also has a past that she'd like to forget. Unable to trust anyone, Matt and Olivia are forced to work outside the law to save themselves and their future.

== Adaptations ==
The first adaptation of the novel was a Spanish television miniseries of the same name that was released on Netflix in April 2021.

In November 2026, Netflix announced a second miniseries adaptation, with Robert Hull, Bryan Wynbrandt, and Steven Lilien being tapped to write, showrun and executive produce. They previously served as writers and executive producers of the 2026 miniseries I Will Find You, which is based on the novel of the same name by Coben.
