= Wild Flowers (2022 film) =

- Theatrical release poster
- Spanish: Girasoles silvestres
- Directed by: Jaime Rosales
- Screenplay by: Jaime Rosales; Bárbara Díez
- Starring: Anna Castillo; Oriol Pla; Quim Àvila; Lluís Marquès; Manolo Solo; Carolina Yuste; Diana Gómez
- Cinematography: Hélène Louvart
- Production companies: Fresdeval Films; A Contracorriente Films; Oberon Media; Luxbox
- Distributed by: A Contracorriente Films (es)
- Release dates: 17 September 2022 (Zinemaldia); 14 October 2022 (Spain)
- Running time: 106 minutes
- Countries: Spain; France
- Languages: Spanish; Catalan

Wild Flowers (Spanish: Girasoles silvestres) is a 2022 Spanish-French film directed by Jaime Rosales which stars Anna Castillo alongside Oriol Pla, Quim Àvila, and Lluís Marquès.

== Plot ==
The plot tracks Julia, a 22-year-old single mother with a strong zest for life who falls romantically for a conflictive man, Óscar, also meeting another two men with different backgrounds.

== Cast ==
- Anna Castillo as Julia
- Oriol Pla as Óscar
- Quim Àvila as Marcos
- Lluís Marquès as Alex
- Manolo Solo as Roberto
- Carolina Yuste as Maite
- Diana Gómez as Magalí

== Production ==
The screenplay was penned by Jaime Rosales and Bárbara Díez. The film is a Fresdeval Films, A Contracorriente Films, Oberon Media and Luxbox production, and it had participation from RTVE, TV3 and Movistar+ and funding from ICAA, ICEC and Creative Europe's MEDIA. Filming began in Barcelona by February 2021. Shooting locations also included Mataró, Banyoles and Melilla. Hélène Louvart worked as cinematographer.

== Release ==
The film was selected for screening at the 70th San Sebastián International Film Festival's official selection, where it was presented on 17 September 2022. Distributed by A Contracorriente Films, it was theatrically released in Spain on 14 October 2022.

== Reception ==
Jonathan Holland of ScreenDaily considered that the film signals "an interesting step towards the mainstream" by Rosales, featuring a "captivating, sometimes wrenching, and always relatable central performance" by Castillo.

=== Top ten lists ===
The film appeared on a number of critics' top ten lists of the best Spanish films of 2022:

- 3rd — ABC (Oti Rodríguez Marchante)
- 3rd — El Cultural (Mariona Burrull)
- 7th — Cadena SER (Elio Castro)

== Accolades ==
Year	Award	Category	Nominee(s)	Result	Ref.
2022	28th Forqué Awards	Best Film Actress	Anna Castillo	Nominated	
2023	15th Gaudí Awards	Best Actress	Anna Castillo	Nominated	
2023	15th Gaudí Awards	Best Actor	Oriol Pla Solina	Nominated	
2023	10th Feroz Awards	Best Actress in a Film	Anna Castillo	Nominated	
2023	10th Feroz Awards	Best Supporting Actor in a Film	Oriol Pla	Nominated	
2023	10th Feroz Awards	Best Film Poster	Gonzalo Rute, Quim Vives	Nominated	
2023	78th CEC Medals	Best Actress	Anna Castillo	Nominated	
2023	78th CEC Medals	Best Supporting Actor	Manolo Solo	Nominated	
2023	78th CEC Medals	Best New Actor	Lluís Marqués	Nominated	
2023	37th Goya Awards	Best Actress	Anna Castillo	Nominated	
2023	31st Actors and Actresses Union Awards	Best Film Actor in a Minor Role	Manolo Solo	Nominated	
2023	67th Sant Jordi Awards	Best Actress	Anna Castillo	Won	

== See also ==
- List of Spanish films of 2022
