= Werewolf (2023 film) =

- Theatrical release poster
- Catalan: Llobàs
- Directed by: Pau Calpe Rufat
- Screenplay by: Pau Calpe Rufat; Nati Escobar Gutiérrez
- Based on: Lobisón by Ginés Sánchez
- Produced by: Pau Calpe Rufat; Xavier Crespo; Juan Carlos Claver
- Starring: León Martínez; Pol López; Maria Rodríguez Soto
- Cinematography: Víctor Entrecanales
- Edited by: Ares Botanch
- Music by: Tarquim
- Production companies: Galápagos Media; Dacsa Produccions
- Distributed by: Alfa Pictures
- Release dates: October 2023 (Warsaw); 17 July 2024 (Spain)
- Country: Spain
- Language: Catalan

Werewolf (Catalan: Llobàs) is a 2023 Spanish drama film directed by Pau Calpe Rufat based on the novel Lobisón by Ginés Sánchez. It stars León Martínez, Pol López, and Maria Rodríguez Soto.

== Plot ==
The plot follows the plight of bullied mute boy Adrià, who is on the road with his older brother Ramon and the latter's girlfriend Tona and who cannot fall asleep on full moon nights, eating hens.

== Cast ==
- León Martínez as Adrià
- Pol López as Ramon
- Maria Rodríguez Soto as Tona
- Carles Sanjaime as Pep
- Josep Manel Casany as Paco
- Jany Collado as Javito
- Eduard Muntada

== Production ==
The film was produced by Catalan outfit Galápagos Media alongside Valencian Dacsa Produccions, with the participatión of TVC, À Punt, TVE and backing from IVC. It was shot in the provinces of Castellón (Benicarló, Bel, Cases del Riu) and Tarragona (Ebro Delta, La Sénia, Ulldecona).

== Release ==
The film had its world premiere at the 39th Warsaw International Film Festival. Its also screened at the Giffoni Film Festival, D'A Film Festival Barcelona, and Cinema Jove. Distributed by Alfa Pictures, it was released theatrically in Spain on 17 July 2024.

== Reception ==
Pere Vall of Fotogramas rated the film 4 out of 5 stars writing that it manages to "connect social and fantasy cinema with the most special affections, looks and silences".

== See also ==
- List of Spanish films of 2024
