= Blog (film) =

- Film poster
- Directed by: Elena Trapé
- Story by: Elena Trapé; Tomàs Aragay; Lluís Segura
- Starring: Candela Antón; Anna Castillo; Lola Errando; Sara Gómez; Lidia Torrent; Irene Trullén; Alada Vila
- Cinematography: Bet Rourich
- Edited by: Liana Artigal
- Production company: Escándalo Films
- Distributed by: Emon Films
- Release dates: 18 September 2010 (Zinemaldia); 21 January 2011 (Spain)
- Country: Spain
- Language: Spanish

Blog is a 2010 Spanish drama film directed by Elena Trapé. It stars Candela Antón, Anna Castillo, Lola Errando, Sara Gómez, Lidia Torrent, Irene Trullén, and Alada Vila.

== Plot ==
A group of upper-middle class 15-year-old girls devise a secret plan to get all pregnant.

== Cast ==
- Candela Antón as Marta
- Irene Trullén as Paula
- Anna Castillo as Bea
- Sara Gómez as Sandra
- Lola Errando as María
- Lidia Torrent as Laura
- Alada Vila as Aurea

== Production ==
According to Trapé, the film was developed upon the premises of Escándalo Films wanting to shot a film about teens with a domestic camera and Trapé's wish to adapt the Gloucester high school multiple pregnancy case. It was produced by Escándalo Films, a film studio associated to the ESCAC.

== Release ==
The film made it to the 'Zabaltegi' slate of the 58th San Sebastián International Film Festival, landing its presentation on the 2nd day of the festival. It was released theatrically in Spain on 21 January 2011.

== Reception ==
Desirée de Fez of Fotogramas rated the film 4 out of 5 stars, writing that "the strong point of 'Blog' is its naturalness".

Javier Ocaña of El País deemed Blog to be an "stimulating" debut film, being both an "exercise in style", "a paradigm of social cinema far removed from dogmatism, and a desolate display of the affective canons of Spanish upper-middle class adolescence".

== Accolades ==
Year	Award	Category	Nominee(s)	Result	Ref.
2012	67th CEC Medals	Best New Director	Elena Trapé	Nominated	

== See also ==
- List of Spanish films of 2011
