= Su majestad =

- Promotional release poster
- Created by: Borja Cobeaga; Diego San José
- Written by: Borja Cobeaga; Diego San José; José Antonio Pérez Ledo
- Directed by: Borja Cobeaga; Diego San José; Ginesta Guindal
- Starring: Anna Castillo; Ernesto Alterio
- Country of origin: Spain
- Original language: Spanish

Production
- Executive producers: Laura Fernández Espeso; Nahikari Ipiña
- Production companies: 100 Balas; Sayaka Producciones

Original release
- Network: Amazon Prime Video
- Release: 27 February 2025 – present

Su majestad is a Spanish comedy television series created by Borja Cobeaga and Diego San José which stars Anna Castillo and Ernesto Alterio. The series premiered on 27 February 2025. On 15 October 2025, it was renewed for a second season.

== Plot ==
Spain. 2024. After a scandal involving Alfonso XVI damages the monarchy's reputation, the king takes a temporary backseat and his daughter and heir apparent to the throne of Spain, irresponsible princess Pilar, takes over the monarchic institution to show that she is up to the task.

== Cast ==
- Anna Castillo as Pilar
- Ernesto Alterio as Guillermo, Pilar's secretary
- Pablo Derqui as Alfonso XVI
- Ramón Barea as chief of the Royal Household
- Ana María Vidal as Guillermo's mother
- Lucía Díez as Camino
- Pablo Vázquez as security chief
- Freddie Dennis

== Production ==
The series is a 100 Balas and Sayaka Producciones production consisting of seven episodes. Shooting locations included Madrid and its surroundings.

In October 2025, it was reported the series had been renewed for a second season. Leonor Watling and Ángela Cervantes joined the cast for season 2.

== Release ==
Amazon Prime Video released the series on 27 February 2025.

== Reception ==
Estrella Gomez of IGN gave the series 8 points ('very good'), declaring it "a must-see series if you have Prime Video".

== Accolades ==
Year	Award	Category	Nominee(s)	Result	Ref.
2026	27th Iris Awards	Best Fiction		Pending	
2026	27th Iris Awards	Best Actress	Anna Castillo	Nominated	
2026	27th Iris Awards	Best Fiction Production	Carlos Apolinario	Pending	
2026	27th Iris Awards	Best Fiction Screenplay	Borja Cobeaga, Diego San José, José Antonio Pérez Ledo	Pending	
2026	13th Feroz Awards	Best Main Actress in a Series	Anna Castillo	Nominated	

== See also ==
- 2025 in Spanish television
