= The Olive Tree (2016 film) =

2016 film

- Film poster
- Spanish: El olivo
- Directed by: Icíar Bollaín
- Written by: Paul Laverty
- Produced by: Juan Gordon
- Starring: Anna Castillo; Javier Gutiérrez; Pep Ambròs; Manuel Cucala; Miguel Ángel Aladren
- Cinematography: Sergi Gallardo
- Edited by: Nacho Ruiz Capillas
- Music by: Pascal Gaigne
- Production companies: Morena Films; The Match Factory
- Distributed by: eOne Films Spain
- Release dates: 6 March 2016 (MFF); 6 May 2016 (Spain)
- Running time: 100 minutes
- Countries: Spain; Germany
- Language: Spanish
- Box office: $1.9 million

The Olive Tree (Spanish: El olivo) is a 2016 drama film directed by Icíar Bollaín and written by Paul Laverty starring Anna Castillo alongside Javier Gutiérrez and Pep Ambròs. It was shortlisted as one of three films as the Spanish submission for the Best Foreign Language Film at the 89th Academy Awards, but was not selected.

== Plot ==
Alma is a 20-year-old girl and adores her grandfather, a man who has not spoken for years. When the elderly man also refuses to eat, the girl decides to recover the millenary tree that the family sold against his will. In order to succeed, she needs to count on her uncle, a victim of the crisis, her friend Rafa, and her whole town to help her. The problem is to find out where in Europe the olive tree is.

== Cast ==
- Anna Castillo as Alma
- Javier Gutiérrez as Alcachofa
- Pep Ambròs as Rafa
- Manuel Cucala as Ramón
- Miguel Angel Aladren as Luis
- Ana Isabel Mena as Sole
- Carme Pla as Vanessa

== Production ==
The film is a Spanish-German co-production by Morena Films alongside The Match Factory.

== Release ==
The film had its world premiere at the Miami Festival. Distributed by eOne Films Spain, it was released theatrically in Spain on 6 May 2016.

== Reception ==
=== Critical response ===
On the review aggregator website Rotten Tomatoes, 88% of 26 critics' reviews are positive, with an average rating of 6.7/10.

Jonathan Holland of The Hollywood Reporter underscored the film to be "a feel-good combination of angry and tender".

=== Awards and nominations ===
Year	Award	Category	Nominee(s)	Result	Ref.
2017	4th Feroz Awards	Best Main Actress in a Film	Anna Castillo	Nominated	
2017	31st Goya Awards	Best Supporting Actor	Javier Gutiérrez	Nominated	
2017	31st Goya Awards	Best New Actress	Anna Castillo	Won	
2017	31st Goya Awards	Best Original Screenplay	Paul Laverty	Nominated	
2017	31st Goya Awards	Best Original Score	Pascal Gaigne	Nominated	
