= The Last Night at Tremore Beach =

2024 television miniseries by Oriol Paulo

- Promotional release poster
- Spanish: La última noche en Tremor
- Genre: Psychological thriller
- Based on: La última noche en Tremore Beach by Mikel Santiago
- Written by: Oriol Paulo; Jordi Vallejo; Lara Sendim
- Directed by: Oriol Paulo
- Starring: Javier Rey; Ana Polvorosa; Guillermo Toledo; Pilar Castro
- Music by: Fernando Velázquez
- Country of origin: Spain
- No. of episodes: 8

Production
- Producers: Oriol Paulo; Sandra Hermida
- Running time: 57–81 min
- Production companies: Acantilado Studio; Sospecha Films; Think Studio; Colosé Producciones; Juanita Film

Original release
- Network: Netflix
- Release: 25 October 2024

The Last Night at Tremore Beach (Spanish: La última noche en Tremor) is a Spanish psychological thriller miniseries directed by Oriol Paulo based on the novel by Mikel Santiago. It was released on Netflix on 25 October 2024.

== Premise ==
Composer and pianist Álex retires to a secluded seaside location and, in the wake of an accident, he starts experiencing eerie visions about his neighbors.

== Cast ==
- Javier Rey as Álex
- Ana Polvorosa as Judy
- Guillermo Toledo as Leo / Álvaro
- Pilar Castro as María / Alicia
- Carla Quílez as Bea
- Jordi Catalán as Bruno
- Nora Navas
- Josean Bengoetxea

== Production ==
An adaptation of the novel La última noche en Tremore Beach (Ediciones B, 2014) by Mikel Santiago, the series was written by Oriol Paulo in collaboration with Jordi Vallejo and Lara Sendim. It was produced by Acantilado Studio alongside Sospecha Films, Think Studio, Colosé Producciones, and Juanita Film. Instead of taking place in Ireland like the novel, the fiction is set in an Asturian village.

== Release ==
The series was released worldwide on Netflix on 25 October 2024.

== Reception ==
The Last Night at Tremore Beach received positive reviews from critics. The review aggregator website Rotten Tomatoes reported an 83% approval rating based on 6 critic reviews.

Reviewing for Common Sense Media, Weiting Liu wrote, "The Last Night at Tremore Beach creates an eerie ambiance with its wintry, gloomy coastal setting and delivers a melancholic beauty with its formal cinematography."

== See also ==
- 2024 in Spanish television
