= La manzana de oro =

- Theatrical release poster
- Directed by: Jaime Chávarri
- Screenplay by: José Ángel Esteban; Jaime Chávarri
- Based on: Ávidas pretensiones by Fernando Aramburu
- Produced by: Mario Real; Pia Christian Burnell
- Starring: Adrián Lastra; Marta Nieto; Sergi López; Vicky Peña; Rodrigo Soares; Joaquín Climent; Paca Gabaldón; Ginés García Millán; Carla Campra; Roberto Enríquez; Elena Seijo; Abelo Valis; Loreto Fajardo; Isabel Garrido; Kenia Mestre; Álvaro Subiés; Celso Bugallo; Mela Casal
- Cinematography: Kiko de la Rica
- Edited by: Teresa Font
- Music by: Rui Massena
- Production companies: Lapiruletaylamanzana AIE; La Piruleta Films; Boavista Filmes
- Distributed by: A Contracorriente Films
- Release dates: 30 September 2022 (OUFF); 1 September 2023 (Spain)
- Countries: Spain; Portugal
- Language: Spanish

La manzana de oro (lit. 'The golden apple') is a 2022 Spanish-Portuguese comedy film directed by Jaime Chávarri from a screenplay by José Ángel Esteban and Chávarri based on the novel Ávidas pretensiones by Fernando Aramburu. Its cast is led by Adrián Lastra, Marta Nieto, and Sergi López.

== Plot ==
The plot is set against the backdrop the 'Golden Apple' literary prize, with a heterogeneous group of poets vying for the prize attending to a manor house in northwestern Iberia. Sex, crushes and hidden secrets coming to light unfold among the attendees.

== Cast ==
- Adrián Lastra as Eugenio Alpuente
- Marta Nieto as La Nívea
- Sergi López as Juanjo Changa
- Roberto Enríquez as Mateo
- Vicky Peña as Manolita
- Ginés García Millán as Carlos Luis
- Paca Gabaldón as Amelia
- Joaquín Climent as Carmelo
- Elena Seijo as Sagrario
- Carla Campra as Vanessa
- Isabel Garrido as Susana
- Loreto Fajardo as Conchita
- Álvaro Subiés as Dámaso
- Pilar Bautista as Poetisa
- Rodrigo Soares as Gonçalito
- Celso Bugallo
- Kenia Mestre
- Abelo Valis
- Mela Casal

== Production ==
An adaptation of Fernando Aramburu's novel Ávidas pretensiones, the screenplay was penned by José Ángel Esteban and Jaime Chávarri. The film is a Lapiruletaylamanzana AIE, La Piruleta Films and Boavista Filmes production, and it had the participation of RTVE and backing from Deputación de Ourense. It was shot in the pazo of Bentraces and other locations of the province of Ourense.

== Release ==
The film was selected for the main competition of the 67th Valladolid International Film Festival (Seminci). However, the film was announced as part of the slate of 27th Ourense International Film Festival (OUFF). Upon this reveal, the film was thus removed from the Seminci slate as it was against the festival regulations preventing the screenings of films with a previous public screening in Spanish territory. La manzana de oro was thus presented in the OUFF closing gala on 30 September 2022, whereas Vasil took its place in the Seminci official selection.

Distributed by A Contracorriente Films, the film was released theatrically in Spain on 1 September 2023.

== Reception ==
Toni Vall of Cinemanía rated the film 3 out of 5 stars, deeming the film —"a beautiful and poetic nonsense"—to be "mind-boggling, incomprehensible, absurd, no just simply old-fashioned but outdated to the seventieth power".

Javier Ocaña of El País wrote that the film "starts off poorly and struggles to find its tone", considering it not to be found precisely among Chávarri's good films.

Carmen Puyó of Heraldo de Aragón rated the film 2 out of 5 stars, assessing that it "does not quite work".

== See also ==
- List of Spanish films of 2023
