= Carla Campra =

Spanish actress

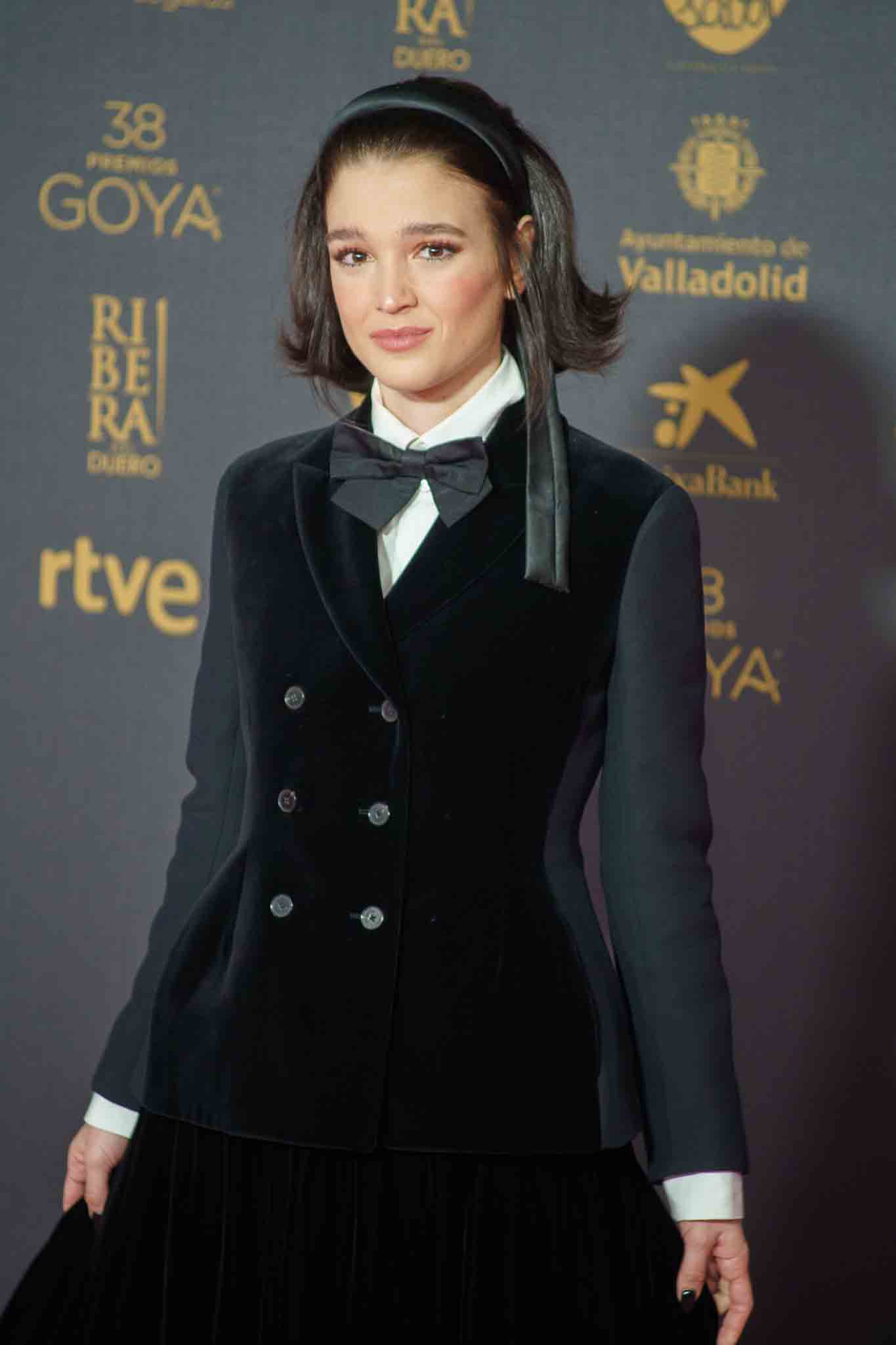
- Campra in 2024
- Born: 16 April 1999 (age 26); Barcelona, Spain
- Occupation: Actress
- Years active: 2007–present

Carla Campra (born 1999) is a Spanish actress. She earned early public recognition for her role in 90-60-90, diario secreto de una adolescente.

== Biography ==
Born in 1999 in Barcelona, she moved years later to Boadilla del Monte with her family. She has an older brother, Guillermo, also dedicated to acting.

Her feature film debut came with her performance in the 2007 drama Atlas de geografía humana, whereas she had her television debut in 2008 with a minor performance in the series Cazadores de hombres. She performed in more than 40 episodes of the TV series Yo soy Bea, playing the young Paloma, and she also landed a main cast role in the series 90-60-90, Diario secreto de una adolescente, which advanced her acting career. Guest appearances in series such as El secreto de Puente Viejo, Centro médico and El hombre de tu vida ensued. Campra also performed in La otra mirada and Señoras del (H)AMPA. Besides a starring role in the second part of the TV movie La duquesa as Eugenia Martínez de Irujo, her film credits include performances in the children's film El sueño de Iván, Verónica and Everybody Knows, in which she played the daughter of Penélope Cruz's character.

In 2020, Campra joined the cast of the daily soap opera Acacias 38 to play Daniela, later joining the production of the Netflix fantasy thriller series Feria.

== Filmography ==
=== Film ===
Year	Title	Original title	Role	Notes
2007	Atlas of Human Geography	Atlas de geografía humana	Clara	
2011	Ivan's Dream	El sueño de Iván	Paula	
2014	Marsella	Marsella	Marta	
2017	Verónica	Verónica	Diana	
2018	Everybody Knows	Todos lo saben	Irene	
2022	La manzana de oro	La manzana de oro	Vanessa	
2022	The Communion Girl	La niña de la comunión	Sara	

=== Television ===
Year	Title	Original title	Role	Notes
2008	Cazadores de hombres	Cazadores de hombres	Laura	Episode: "Operación Ojos Cerrados"
2008–2009	Yo soy Bea	Yo soy Bea	Paloma	Main role (41 episodes)
2009	90-60-90, diario secreto de una adolescente	90-60-90, diario secreto de una adolescente	Julia Álvarez	Main role (8 episodes)
2009	La Mari 2	La Mari 2	Mariona	TV Mini Series
2010	No soy como tú	No soy como tú	Elena	TV Mini Series
2011	La duquesa II	La duquesa II	Eugenia	TV Mini Series
2011–2012	Águila Roja	Águila Roja	Infanta Margarita	2 episodes
2016	El secreto de Puente Viejo	El secreto de Puente Viejo	Clarita	1 episode
2016	El hombre de tu vida	El hombre de tu vida	Eva	Episode: "Amores perros"
2016	Centro médico	Centro médico	Clara	2 episodes
2018–2019	La otra mirada	La otra mirada	Flavia	Main role (21 episode)
2019	Terror.app	Terror.app	Blanca	6 episodes
2019–2021	Dangerous Moms	Señoras del (h)AMPA	Elisabeth Palazuelos	7 episodes
2020	Acacias 38	Acacias 38	Daniela Stabile	44 episodes
2020	30 Coins	30 monedas	Vane	Episode: "Ouija"
2021	The Vineyard	La templanza	Soledad Montalvo (young)	1 episode
2022	Feria: The Darkest Light	Feria: La luz más oscura	Sofía	Main role (8 episodes)
2022–2023	Holy Family	Sagrada familia	Aitana Martínez / Mariana Santos	Main role (16 episodes)
2024	Atasco	Atasco	Photographer	Episode: "Maletero"
2024	Land of Women	Tierra de mujeres	Young Mariona	3 episodes
2024	Asuntos internos	Asuntos internos	Gema	
2025	La caza. Irati	La caza. Irati	Edurne Esteve	
