= The Innocent (TV series) =

Streaming mystery/thriller television series

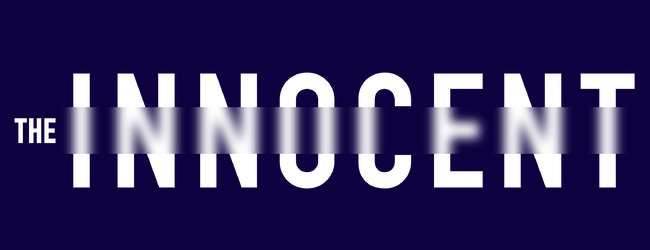
- Spanish: El inocente
- Genre: Mystery; Thriller
- Based on: The Innocent by Harlan Coben
- Written by: Oriol Paulo; Jordi Vallejo; Guillem Clua
- Directed by: Oriol Paulo
- Starring: Mario Casas; Alexandra Jiménez; Aura Garrido; José Coronado
- Country of origin: Spain
- Original language: Spanish
- No. of episodes: 8

Production
- Executive producers: Oriol Paulo; Sandra Hermida; Jesús de la Vega; Eneko Lizarraga; Belén Atienza; Laura Rubirola; Harlan Coben
- Production companies: Sospecha Films; Think Studio

Original release
- Network: Netflix
- Release: 30 April 2021

The Innocent (Spanish: El inocente) is a Spanish television mystery thriller miniseries directed by Oriol Paulo and based on the Harlan Coben novel of the same name. The show stars Mario Casas, Alexandra Jiménez, Aura Garrido and José Coronado. It was released on Netflix on 30 April 2021.

== Premise ==
Nine years after getting himself involved in a quarrel and accidentally killing a man, Mateo attempts to start over with his wife Olivia. They will, however, be surprised by new developments that will tear their lives apart again.

== Cast ==
=== Main ===
- Mario Casas as Mateo "Matt" Vidal
- Alexandra Jiménez as Lorena Ortiz
- Aura Garrido as Olivia Costa
- José Coronado as Teo Aguilar

=== Supporting ===
- Martina Gusmán as Kimmy Dale
- Juana Acosta as Emma
- Gonzalo de Castro as Jaime
- Ana Wagener as Sonia
- Miki Esparbé as Aníbal
- Xavi Sáez as Sáez
- Anna Alarcón as Zoe
- Susi Sánchez as Hermana Irene
- Aysha Daraaui as Lavanda
- Asia Ortega as Cassandra
- Santi Pons as Gallardo

== Background, production and release ==
The Innocent is one of 14 Harlan Coben novels to be made into Netflix series, following Coben's signing of a deal with the company in August 2018. It was announced by Netflix in November 2019, and production began in September 2020. Consisting of 8 episodes, the series is produced by Sospecha Films and Think Studio. Oriol Paulo, Jordi Vallejo and Guillem Clua wrote the screenplay. Oriol Paulo, Sandra Hermida, Jesús de la Vega, Eneko Lizarraga, Belén Atienza, Laura Rubirola and Harlan Coben are credited as executive producers. Largely set in Barcelona, the series was shot in different locations across Catalonia. The secondary setting in Marbella was recreated in the Maresme (Sant Pol de Mar) and Lloret de Mar. The trailer was released on 5 March 2021, and the premiere date of 30 April 2021 announced. After seven reviews, it has a 100% score on Rotten Tomatoes.

== Episodes ==
No.	Title	Directed by	Original release date
1	"Episode 1"	Oriol Paulo	30 April 2021
2	"Episode 2"	Oriol Paulo	30 April 2021
3	"Episode 3"	Oriol Paulo	30 April 2021
4	"Episode 4"	Oriol Paulo	30 April 2021
5	"Episode 5"	Oriol Paulo	30 April 2021
6	"Episode 6"	Oriol Paulo	30 April 2021
7	"Episode 7"	Oriol Paulo	30 April 2021
8	"Episode 8"	Oriol Paulo	30 April 2021
