= Oriol Paulo =

Spanish screenwriter and director (born 1975)

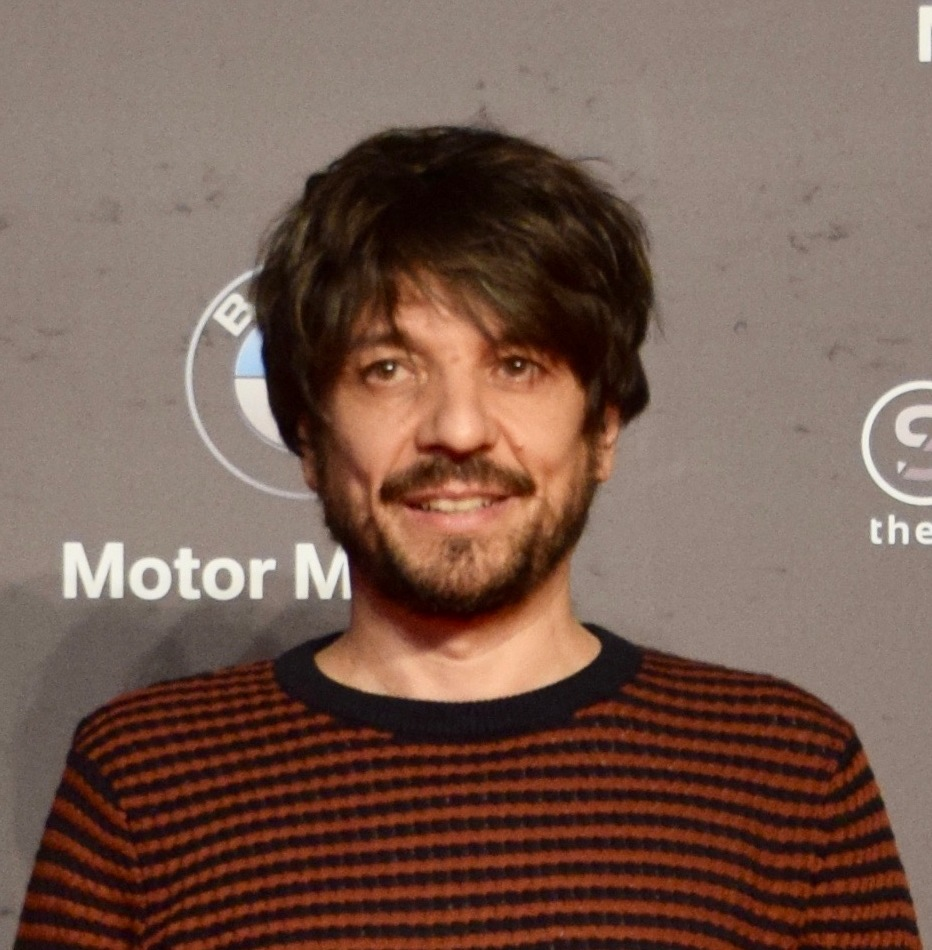
- Paulo in 2018
- Born: 30 July 1975 (age 51); Barcelona, Spain
- Occupations: Director; writer
- Years active: 2004–present

Oriol Paulo (born 30 July 1975) is a Spanish screenwriter and director. He is known for crime thriller movies such as The Body (2012) and The Invisible Guest (2016). Both films garnered international acclaim and were remade in several languages.

== Career ==
Born in Barcelona in 1975, Oriol Paulo earned a licentiate degree in audiovisual communication from the Pompeu Fabra University in 1998. He studied film at the Los Angeles Film School.

As a scriptwriter, he wrote screenplays for small screen films such as Ecos (2006) and Codi 60 (2011). He worked as writer for television series such as Majoria absoluta and El cor de la ciutat, both broadcast on the Catalan public channel TV3.

In cinema, he made himself known as a co-screenwriter alongside Guillem Morales with the thriller Julia's Eyes (2010), produced by Guillermo del Toro. But he had already made some short films such as McGuffin (1998, scriptwriter and director), Tapes (2002, scriptwriter and director) and Eve (2002, scriptwriter and director).

He made his debut as feature film director with the 2012 film The Body, which he also wrote. Paulo was nominated for Best New Director at the Goya Awards and won the Best Film Award at the Fantastic Film Festival in Paris for The Body. In 2016 he wrote the script of Boy Missing, directed by Mar Tarragona. In 2017 Paulo wrote and directed The Invisible Guest, which featured Mario Casas, Barbara Lennie and José Coronado as lead performers. The latter film commanded a great box office performance in China.

From 2016 onwards, Oriol Paulo works as the writer and director of the television series Nit i dia.

== Filmography ==
=== Film ===
Year	Title	Director	Writer
2010	Los ojos de Julia (Julia's Eyes)	No	Yes
2012	El cuerpo (The Body)	Yes	Yes
2016	Secuestro (Boy Missing)	No	Yes
2016	Contratiempo (The Invisible Guest)	Yes	Yes
2018	Durante la tormenta (Mirage)	Yes	Yes
2022	Los renglones torcidos de Dios (God's Crooked Lines)	Yes	Yes
2026	Zeta (Agent Zeta)	No	Yes
2026	En nombre de otro (Proxies)	Yes	Yes

=== Short film ===
Year	Title	Director	Writer
1998	McGuffin	Yes	Yes
2001	El foro	Yes	No
2002	Tapes	Yes	Yes
2002	Eve	Yes	Yes

=== Television ===
Year	Title	Director	Writer	Notes
2004	Majoría Absoluta	No	Yes	TV series; 2 episodes
2004-2009	El Cor de la Ciutat	No	Yes	Soap opera; 75 episodes
2005	Phatagobirí	No	Yes	TV movie
2006	Ecos	Yes	Yes	TV movie
2011	Code 60	No	Yes	TV movie
2016-2017	Nit I Dia	Yes	Yes	TV series; Wrote 25 episodes and directed 11 episodes
2021	El inocente	Yes	Yes	TV Miniseries; 8 episodes Also executive producer
2024	La última noche en Tremor	Yes	Yes	
