= Guillem Clua =

Spanish playwright and screenwriter

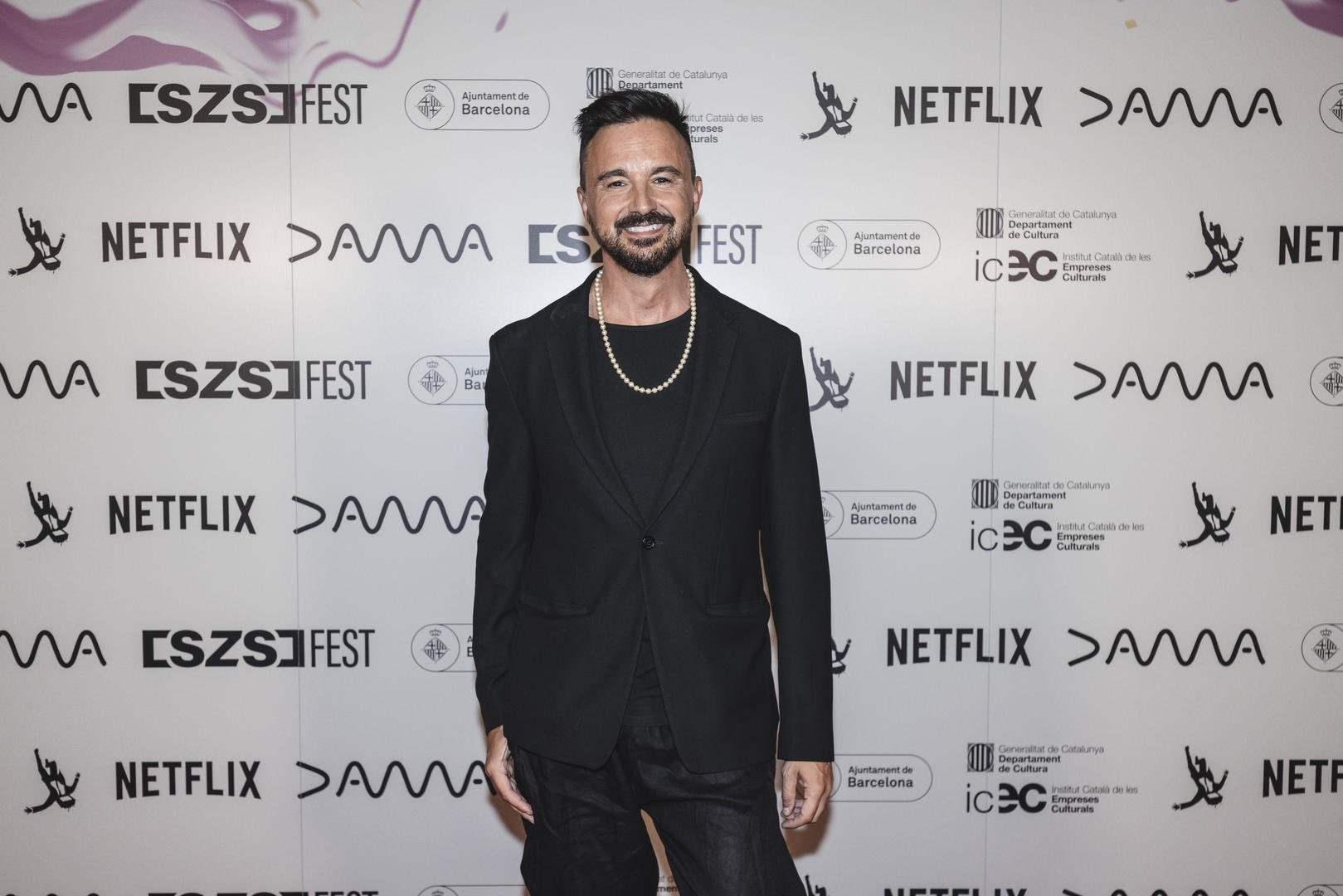
Clua in 2022

Guillem Clua i Sarró (born 1973) is a Spanish Catalan playwright and screenwriter with works both in Spanish and Catalan.

== Biography ==
Guillem Clua was born in Barcelona in 1973. After earning a licentiate degree in journalism from the UAB, he nurtured his writing skills at London Guildhall University. Upon joining Sala Becket, he began writing plays in 2001.

Some of his plays have been adapted into a film and television format: La piel en llamas (in which Clua is credited as co-writer), Smiley (in which Clua is credited as creator), and Invasión (in which Clua is credited as writer). He has also collaborated as screenwriter in television series such as El cor de la ciutat, La Riera, Estoy vivo, Mercado Central, and The Innocent, and films such as God's Crooked Lines and The Communion Girl.

== Accolades ==
Year	Award	Category	Work	Result	Ref.
2013	16th Max Awards	Best Theatrical Authorship in Spanish Language	La piel en llamas	Nominated	
2020	National Dramatic Literature Award (Spain)		Justícia	Won	
2023	15th Gaudí Awards	Best Adapted Screenplay	God's Crooked Lines	Nominated	
2023	37th Goya Awards	Best Adapted Screenplay	God's Crooked Lines	Nominated	
