= Pol López =

Spanish actor (born 1984)

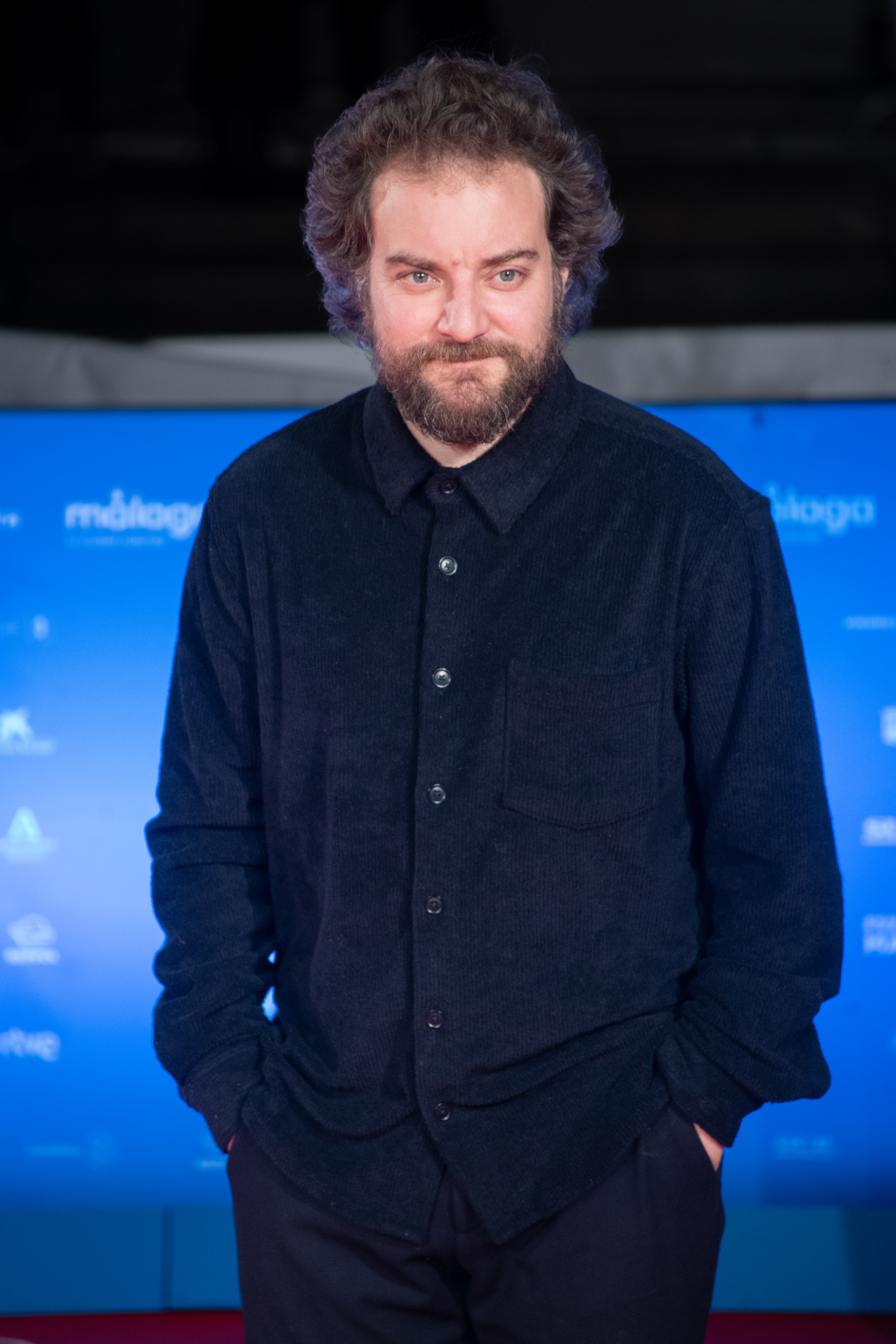
- Born: 1984 (age 41–42); Barcelona, Catalonia, Spain
- Education: Institut del Teatre
- Occupations: Actor; theatre director

Pol López (born 1984) is a Spanish actor from Catalonia.

== Early life and education ==
Pol López was born in 1984 in Barcelona. He received training at the Institut del Teatre, after which he founded the 'Solitària' theatre group alongside Júlia Barceló and Pau Vinyals.

== Career ==
At age 17, he played a bit part in the comedy film The Best Thing That Can Happen to a Croissant (2003). His film work includes appearances in El camino más largo para volver a casa (2014), The Tunnel Gang (2017), and Historias lamentables (2020). In 2021, he played a chilling role as an extreme right thug in The Replacement (2021), a thriller set in 1982 Denia. He also appeared in television series such as Matar al padre, What the Future Holds, Vergüenza, and Santo. His stage credits include performances in American Buffalo and El Curioso incidente del Perro a Medianoche, while he has also directed some plays. Likewise, his role in a play of Hamlet directed by Pau Carrió earned him the Butaca Award for Best Actor in 2016. He portrayed Alceste in a play of The Misanthrope performed at the Teatre Lliure.

He starred alongside Victoria Luengo in the rural thriller Cork (2022) as a couple starting a new life in the cork business. His performance earned him the Gaudí Award for Best Leading Actor. He featured as Emilio Suárez Trashorras, a mentally unstable former miner (and sentenced to 34,715 years in jail), in the crime drama miniseries See You in Another Life (2024), based on the so-called Asturian plot of the 11-M train bombings, the procurement of explosives for the attacks. His role earned him the Feroz Award for Best Supporting Actor in a Series. He also played the role of the protective brother of a teenage werewolf in Werewolf (2023).
