= 9th Feroz Awards =

Spanish film and television awards

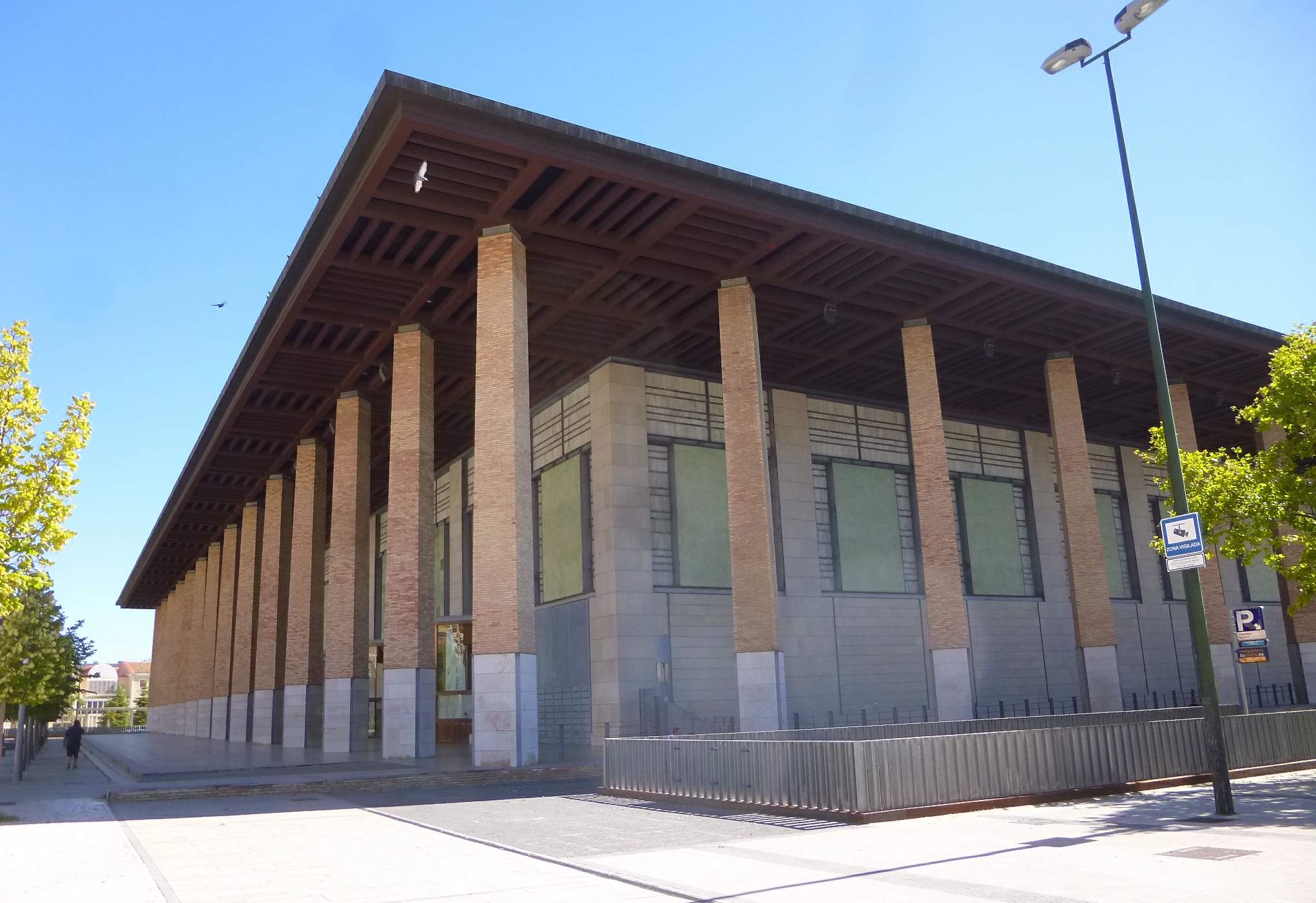
- Auditorio de Zaragoza
- Date: 29 January 2022
- Site: Auditorio de Zaragoza, Zaragoza
- Hosted by: Nacho Vigalondo; Paula Púa
- Organized by: Asociación de Informadores Cinematográficos de España

Highlights
- Best Picture: Maixabel (Drama); The Good Boss (Comedy)
- Best Direction: Rodrigo Cortés; Love Gets a Room
- Best Actor: Javier Bardem; The Good Boss
- Best Actress: Petra Martínez; That Was Life
- Most awards: The Good Boss and Parallel Mothers (3 each)
- Most nominations: The Good Boss (9)

Television coverage
- Network: YouTube

The 9th Feroz Awards ceremony, presented by the Asociación de Informadores Cinematográficos de España, took place at the Auditorio de Zaragoza in Zaragoza, Spain, on 29 January 2022, to recognize the best in Spanish cinema and television. The ceremony was hosted by director Nacho Vigalondo and comedian Paula Púa, and was broadcast on YouTube.

The nominations were announced on 25 November 2021 by actors Elena Rivera and Brays Efe.

== Winners and nominees ==
The nominations for most of the categories were announced on 25 November 2021, with The Good Boss leading the nominations with nine, followed by Maixabel and Parallel Mothers with eight each. The nominations for the Feroz Arrebato awards for fiction and non-fiction were announced on 21 December 2021. A list of winners and nominees is presented as follows:

=== Film ===
Motion Picture
Drama	Comedy
Maixabel – Produced by Koldo Zuazua, Juan Moreno, Guillermo Sempere; The Sacred Spirit – Produced by Miguel Molina, Leire Apellaniz, Marina Perales, Enes Erbay; Libertad – Produced by Sergi Moreno, María Zamora, Tono Folguera, Stefan Schmitz; Parallel Mothers – Produced by Agustín Almodóvar, Esther García; Out of Sync – Produced by Luisa Romeo	The Good Boss – Produced by Fernando León de Aranoa, Jaume Roures, Javier Méndez Zori; Girlfriends – Produced by Miguel Torrente Gómez, Bin Fang; The Cover – Produced by Kiko Martínez; The Odd-Job Men – Produced by Miriam Porté; An Optical Illusion – Produced by Juan Cavestany, Alicia Yubero
Best Performance in a Motion Picture
Actor	Actress
Javier Bardem – The Good Boss as Julio Blanco; Roberto Álamo – Josephine as Juan; Ricardo Gómez – The Replacement as Andrés; Eduard Fernández – Mediterraneo: The Law of the Sea as Òscar Camps; Luis Tosar – Maixabel as Ibon Etxezarreta	Petra Martínez – That Was Life as María; Tamara Casellas – Ama as Pepa; Penélope Cruz – Parallel Mothers as Janis Martínez Moreno; Marta Nieto – Out of Sync as C.; Blanca Portillo – Maixabel as Maixabel Lasa
Best Supporting Performance in a Motion Picture
Supporting Actor	Supporting Actress
Urko Olazabal – Maixabel as Luis Carrasco; Celso Bugallo – The Good Boss as Fortuna; Pere Ponce – The Replacement as Colombo; Chechu Salgado – Outlaws as Zarco; Manolo Solo – The Good Boss as Miralles	Aitana Sánchez-Gijón – Parallel Mothers as Teresa Ferreras; Almudena Amor – The Good Boss as Liliana; Anna Castillo – That Was Life as Verónica; Milena Smit – Parallel Mothers as Ana Manso Ferreras; Carolina Yuste – Girlfriends as Desi
Other
Best Director	Best Screenplay
Rodrigo Cortés – Love Gets a Room; Pedro Almodóvar – Parallel Mothers; Icíar Bollaín – Maixabel; Fernando León de Aranoa – The Good Boss; Clara Roquet – Libertad	Fernando León de Aranoa – The Good Boss; Rodrigo Cortés, David Safier – Love Gets a Room; Clara Roquet – Libertad; Isa Campo, Icíar Bollaín – Maixabel; Juanjo Giménez, Pere Altimira – Out of Sync
Best Original Soundtrack	Special Award (Non-Fiction Film)
Alberto Iglesias – Parallel Mothers; Víctor Reyes – Love Gets a Room; Zeltia Montes – The Good Boss; Vetusta Morla – The Daughter; Alberto Iglesias – Maixabel	Sedimentos; Del otro lado; Magaluf Ghost Town; Who's Stopping Us; Viaje a alguna parte
Best Trailer	Best Film Poster
Miguel Ángel Trudu – The Grandmother; Maurits Malschaert, Mick Aerts – The Good Boss; Miguel Ángel Sanantonio – Outlaws; Alberto Leal – Parallel Mothers; Rafa Martínez – Maixabel	Javier Jaén – Poster A for Parallel Mothers; Octavio Terol, Jorge Alvariño – The Grandmother; Beatriz Riber, Santiago Cubides – Destello bravío; Pablo Sánchez – Dos; Jordi Trilla – Libertad
Special Award (Fiction Film)
The Sacred Spirit; ¡Corten!; Destello bravío; Karen; The Belly of the Sea

=== Series ===
Best Drama Series: Cardo – Created by Ana Rujas, Claudia Costafreda; La Fortuna – Created by Alejandro Amenábar; Hierro – Created by Pepe Coira; Stories to Stay Awake – Created by Alejandro Ibáñez, Victor García; The Time It Takes – Created by Nadia de Santiago, Pablo Santidrián, Inés Pintor	Best Comedy Series: Venga Juan – Created by Diego San José; Queer You Are – Created by Bob Pop; Reyes de la noche – Created by Adolfo Valor, Cristóbal Garrido; Perfect Life – Created by Leticia Dolera
Best Main Actor in a Series: Javier Cámara – Venga Juan as Juan Carrasco; Álvaro Cervantes – The Time It Takes as Nicolás "Nico" Torres; Darío Grandinetti – Hierro as Antonio Díaz Martínez; Daniel Grao – HIT as Hugo Ibarra Toledo "HIT"; Javier Gutiérrez – Reyes de la noche as Francisco Javier Maldonado	Best Main Actress in a Series: Ana Rujas – Cardo as María; Candela Peña – Hierro as Candela Montes; Ana Polvorosa – La Fortuna as Lucía Vallarta; Nadia de Santiago – The Time It Takes as Lina Ruiz; Maribel Verdú – ANA. all in as Ana Tramel Hidalgo
Best Supporting Actor in a Series: Enric Auquer – Perfect Life as Gari; Karra Elejalde – La Fortuna as Enrique Moliner; Adam Jezierski – Venga Juan as Víctor Sanz; Miguel Rellán – Queer You Are as Bob's grandfather; Alberto San Juan – Reyes de la noche as Cerdán	Best Supporting Actress in a Series: María Pujalte – Venga Juan as Macarena Lombardo; Itsaso Arana – Reyes de la noche as Marga Laforet; Najwa Nimri – Money Heist as Alicia Sierra Montes; Candela Peña – Queer You Are as Bob's mother; Yolanda Ramos – Cardo as Fausta

== Multiple nominations and wins ==
=== Film ===
Films that received multiple nominations
Nominations	Films
9	The Good Boss
8	Maixabel
8	Parallel Mothers
4	Libertad
3	Love Gets a Room
3	Out of Sync
2	Girlfriends
2	The Grandmother
2	Outlaws
2	The Replacement
2	That Was Life

Films that received multiple awards
Awards	Film
3	The Good Boss
3	Parallel Mothers
2	Maixabel

=== Series ===
Series that received multiple nominations
Nominations	Series
4	Reyes de la noche
4	Venga Juan
3	Cardo
3	La Fortuna
3	Hierro
3	Queer You Are
3	The Time It Takes
2	Perfect Life

Series that received multiple awards
Awards	Series
3	Venga Juan
2	Cardo

== See also ==
- 36th Goya Awards
