= 14th Gaudí Awards =

Film award ceremony organised by the Catalan Film Academy

- Date: 6 March 2022
- Site: MNAC's Oval Room, Barcelona, Catalonia, Spain
- Organized by: Catalan Film Academy

The 14th Gaudí Awards, organised by the Catalan Film Academy, will be presented at the MNAC's Oval Room in Barcelona on 6 March 2022.

== History ==
The nominations were read by Francesc Orella and María Molins at La Pedrera's auditorium on 25 January 2022. Outlaws grossed the highest number of nominations, 13. Only one film (Mironins) was nominated in the animation category, thus securing the award. Enric Cambray was tasked with the direction of the gala, whereas El Terrat was charged with the production.

In addition to the regular awards, 8 films were nominated to the Public's Choice Special Award for Best Film, and cinematographer Tomàs Pladevall was revealed as the recipient of the honorary Gaudí award.

== Winners and nominees ==
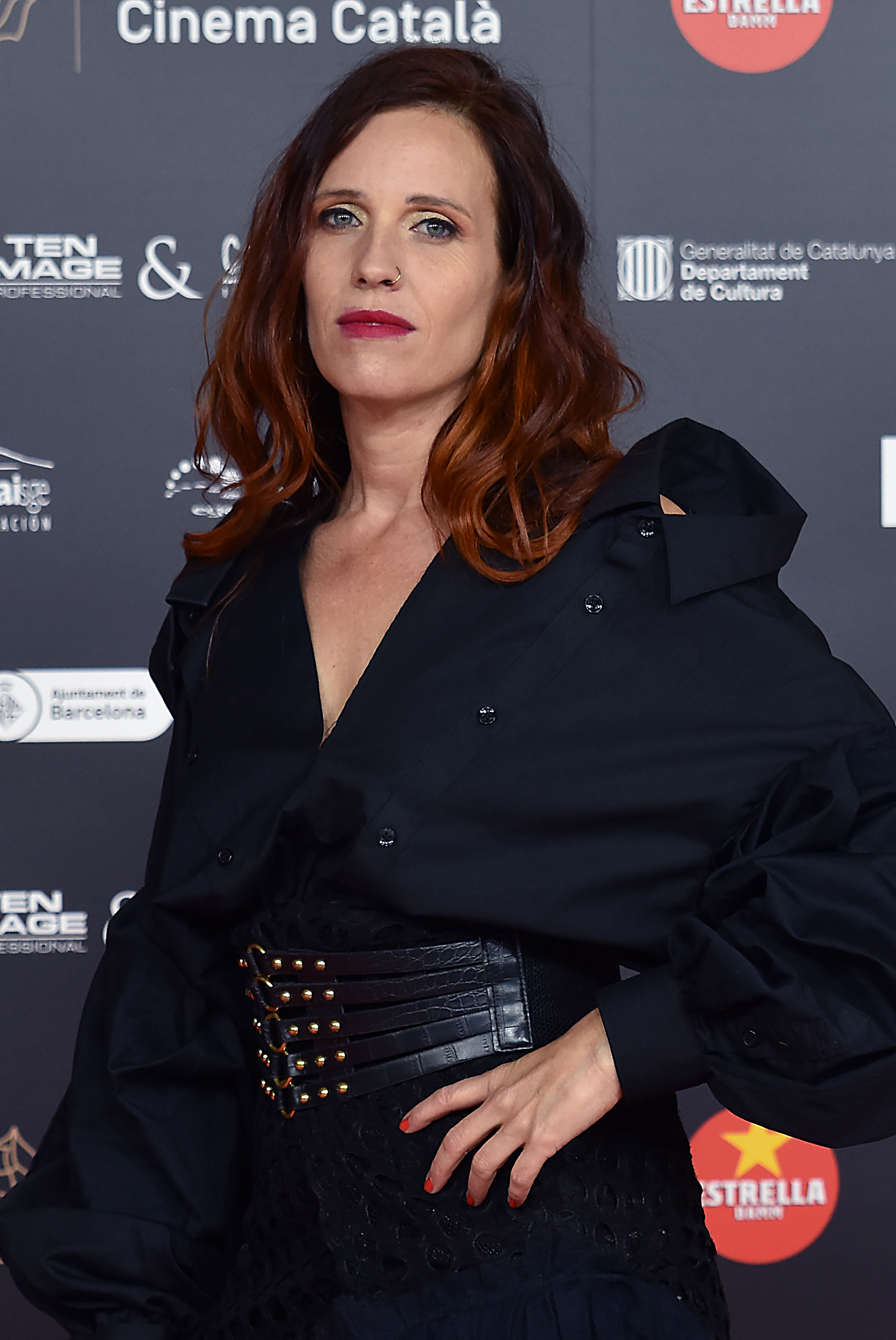
Neus Ballús, Best Director winner.

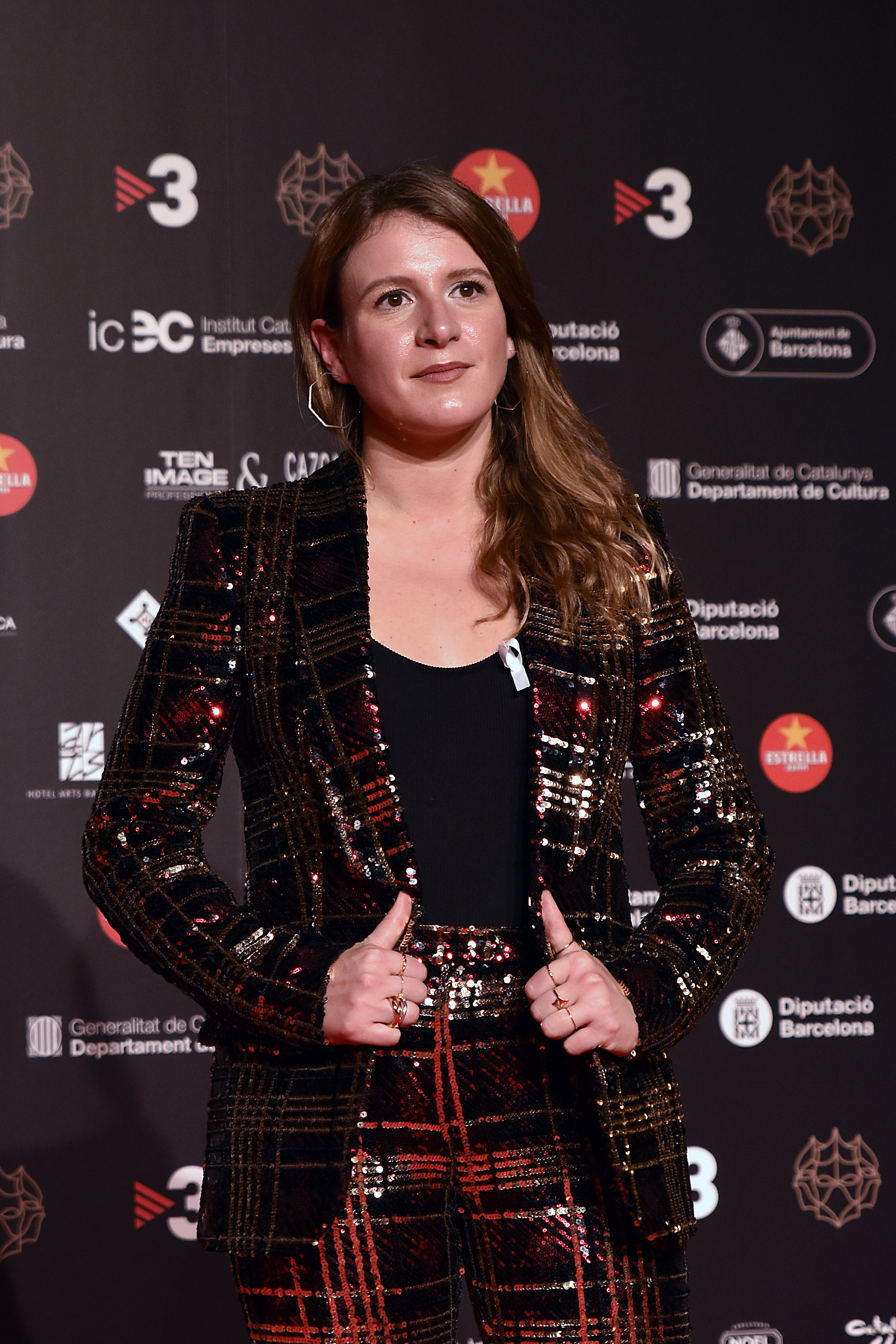
Clara Roquet, Best Screenplay winner.

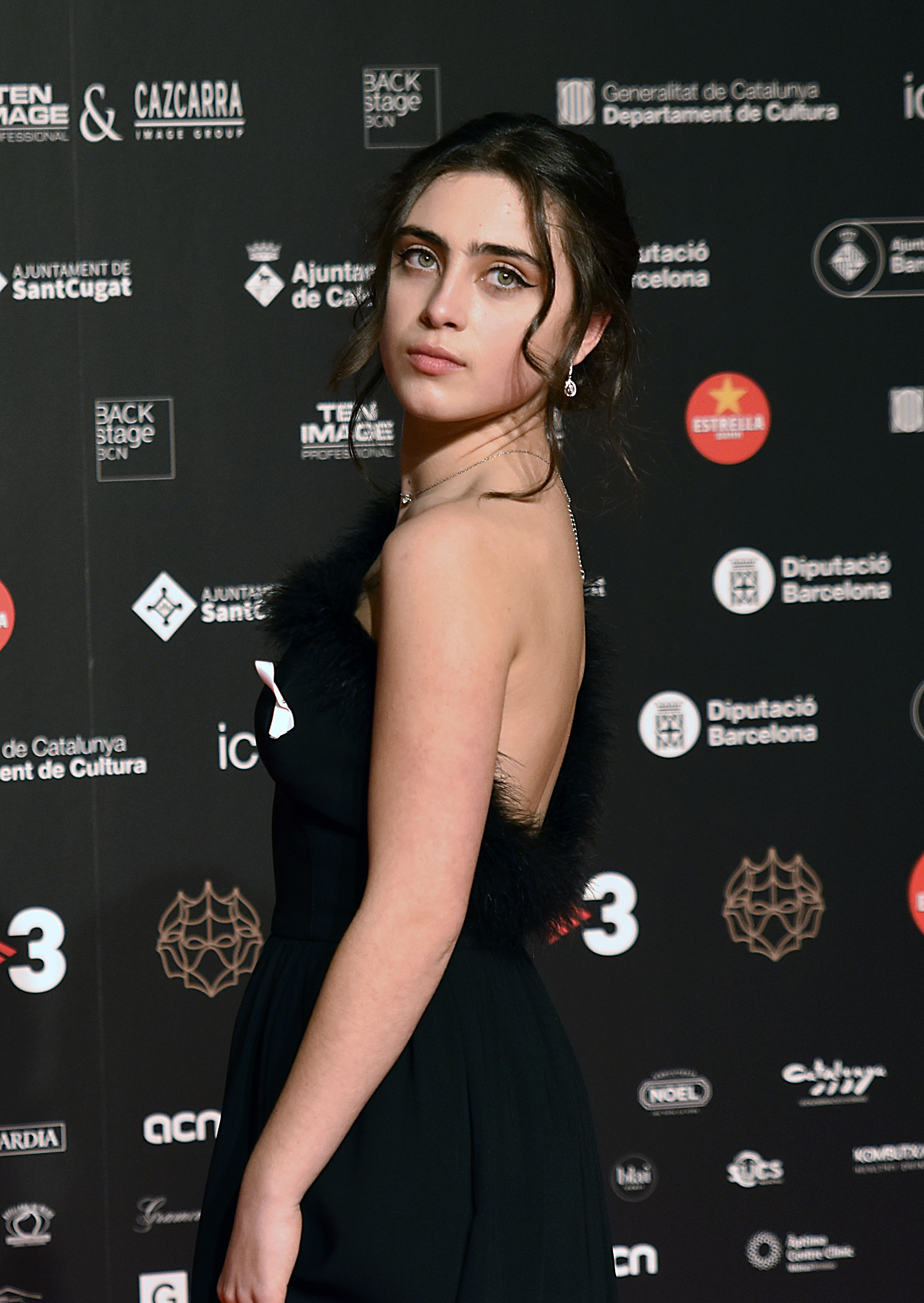
Maria Morera, Best Actress winner.

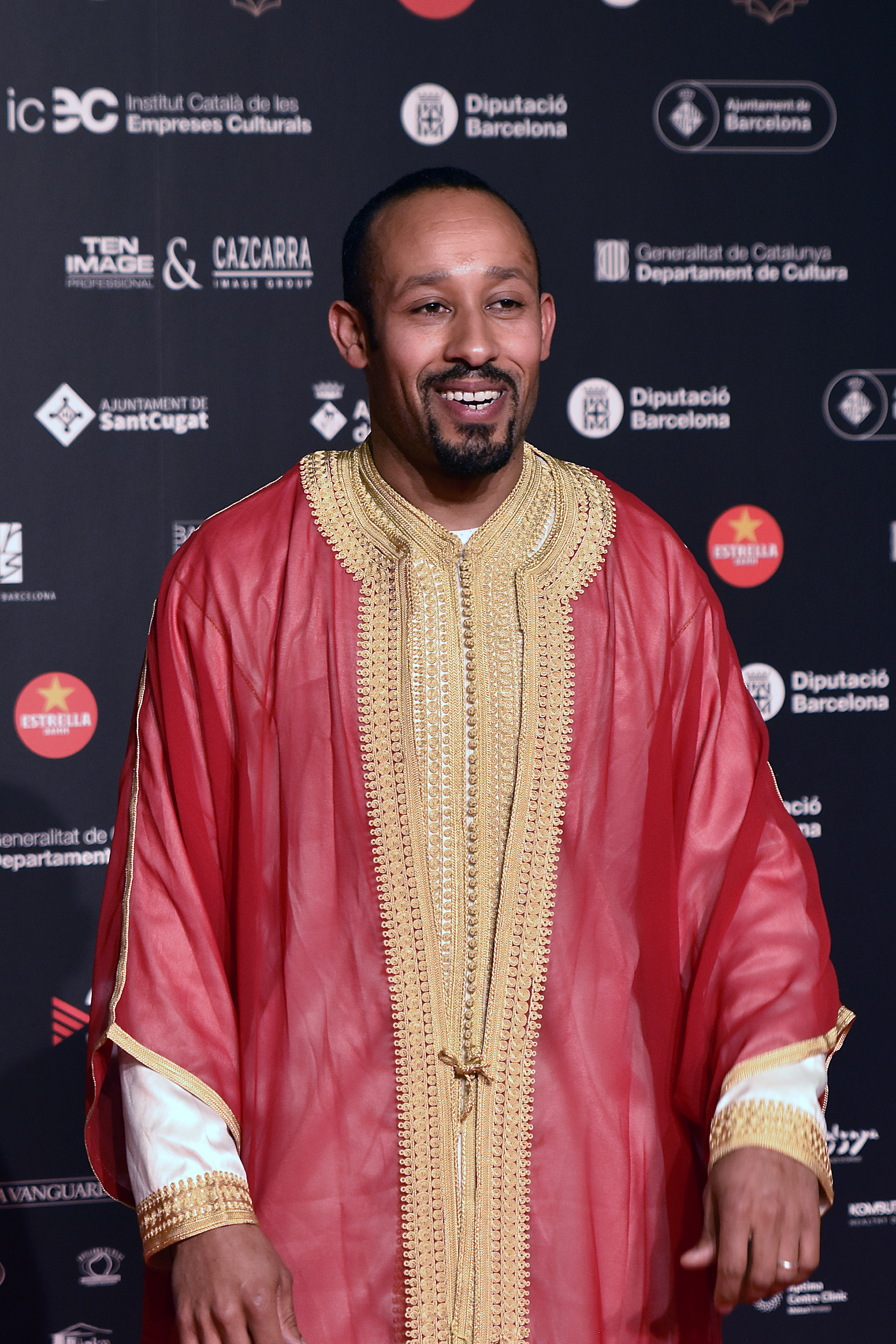
Mohamed Mellali, Best Actor winner.

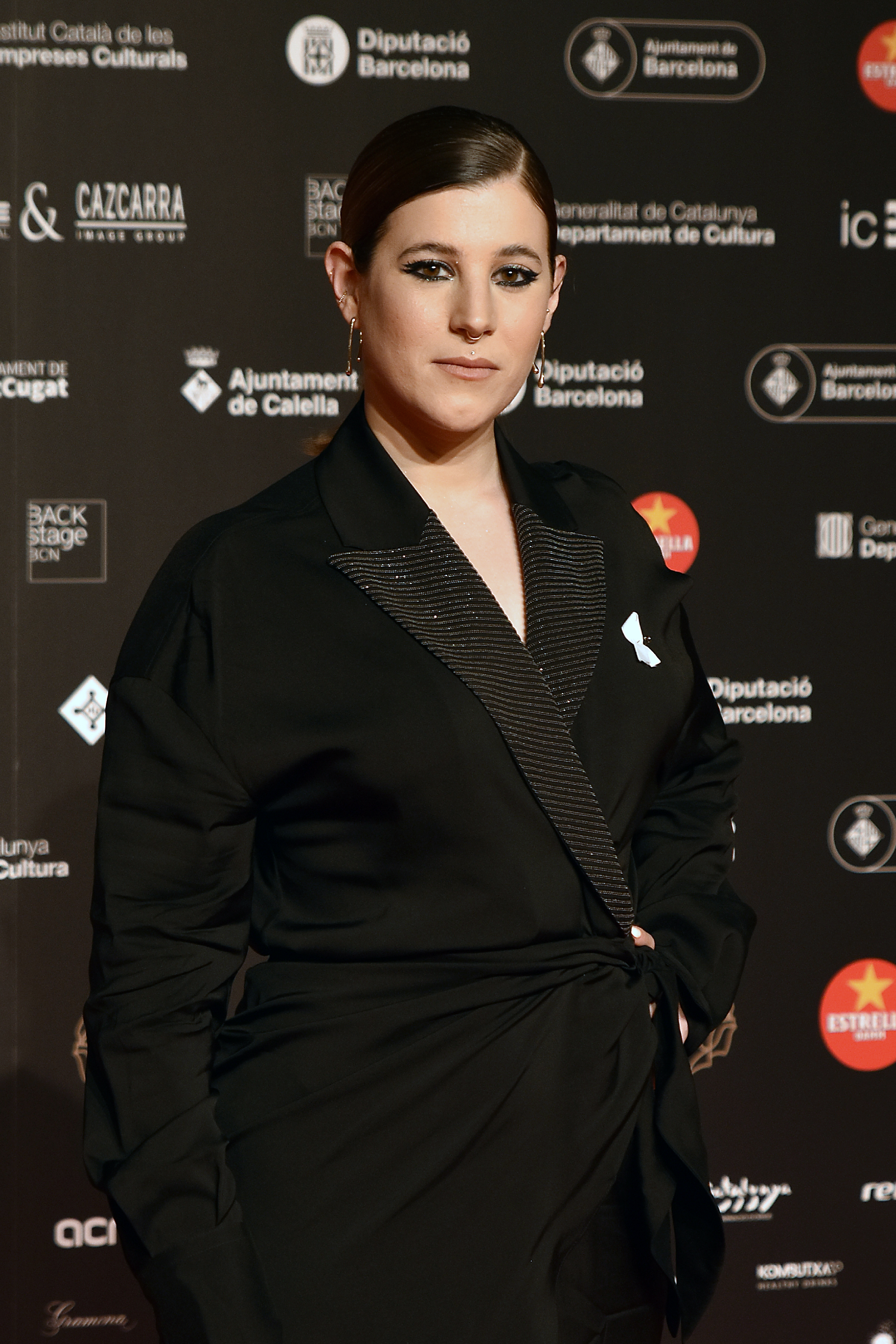
Ángela Cervantes, Best Supporting Actress winner.

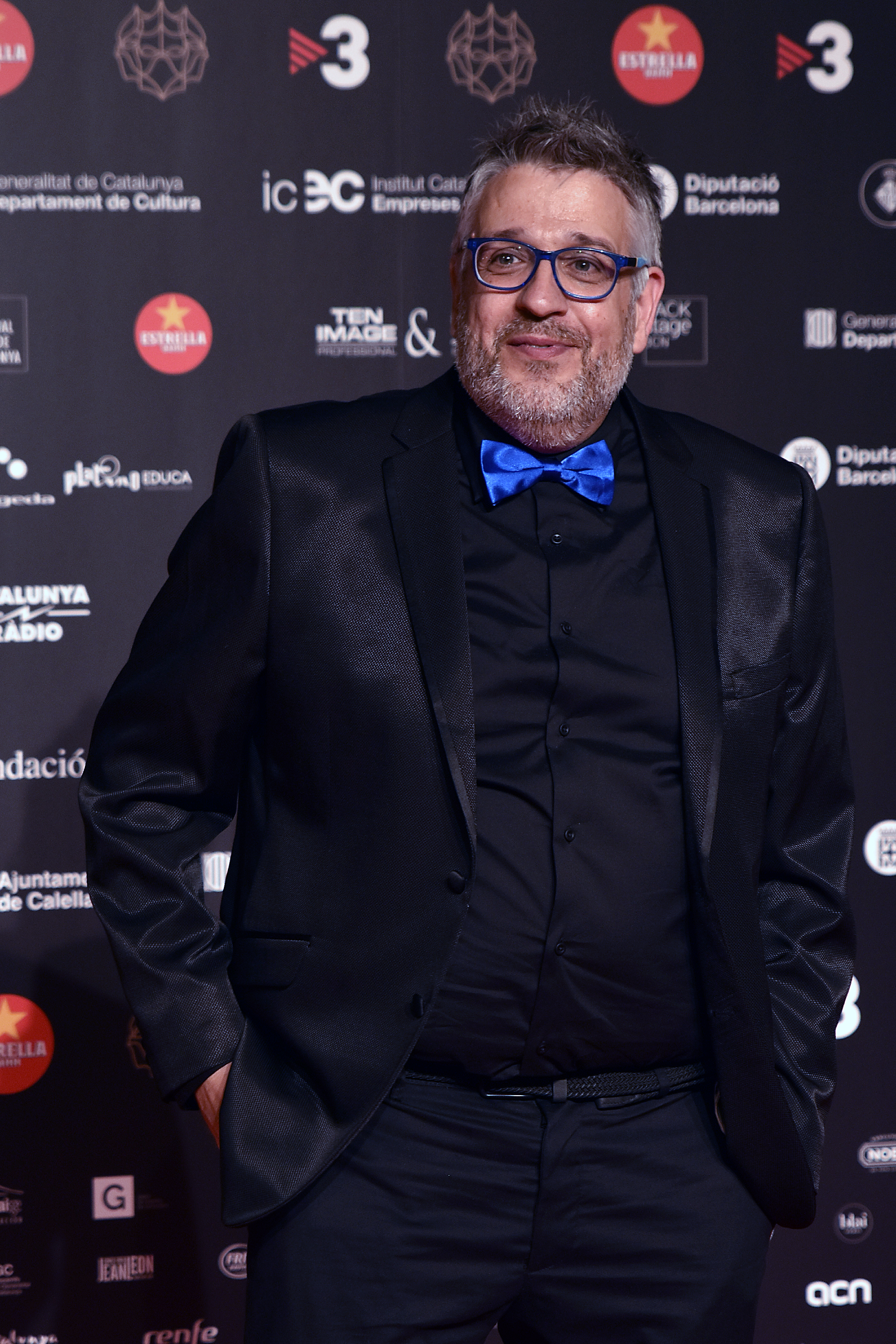
Valero Escolar, Best Supporting Actor winner.

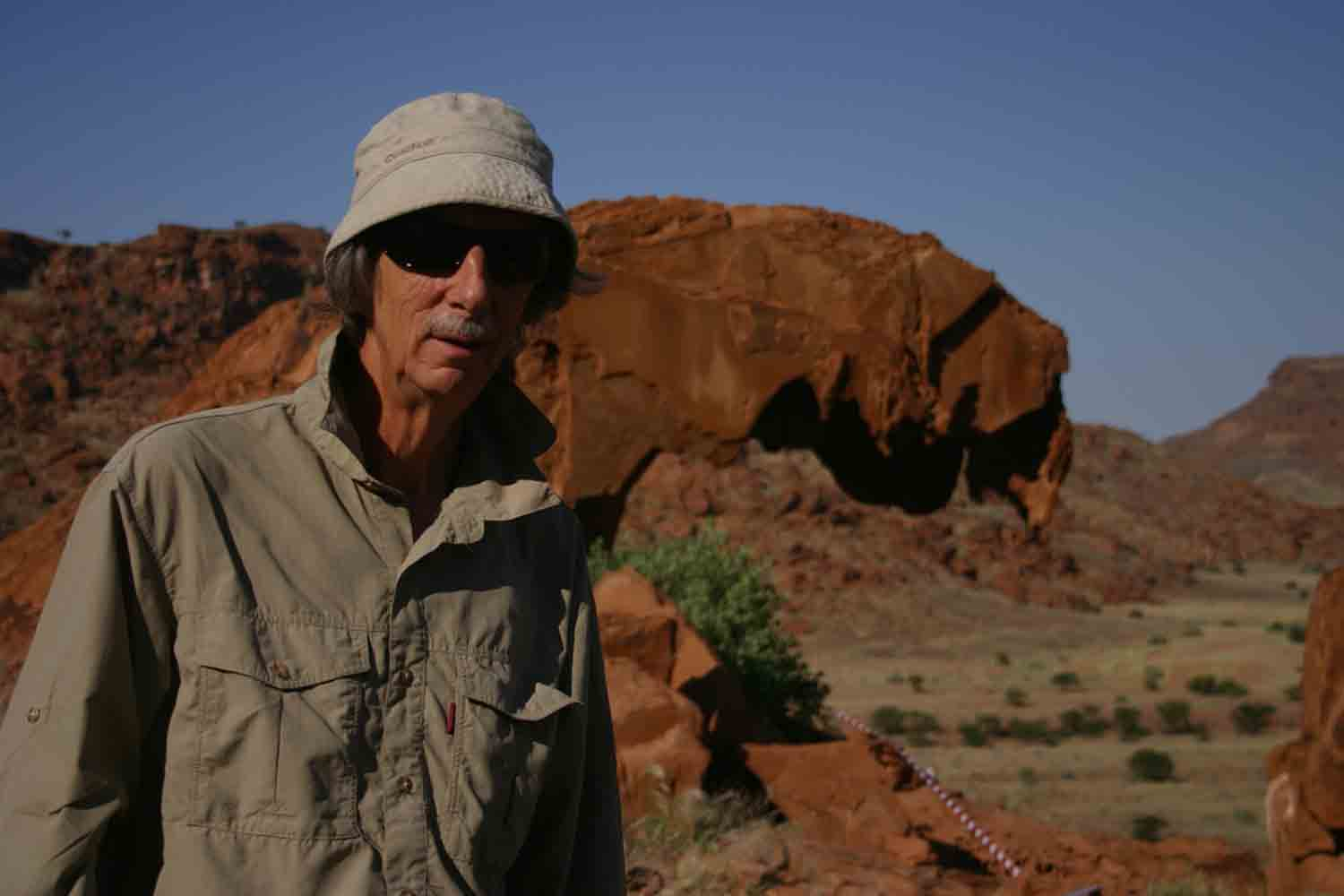
Tomàs Pladevall, Honorary Award recipient.

The winners and nominees are listed as follows:

| Best Film: The Odd-Job Men; The Belly of the Sea; Tros; Visitor | Bet Non-Catalan Language Film: Libertad; Outlaws; Mediterraneo: The Law of the Sea; Out of Sync |
| Best Director: Neus Ballús — The Odd-Job Men; Agustí Villaronga — The Belly of the Sea; Daniel Monzón — Outlaws; Clara Roquet — Libertad | Best Screenplay: Clara Roquet — Libertad; Agustí Villaronga — The Belly of the Sea; Neus Ballús, Margarita Melgar — The Odd-Job Men; Juanjo Giménez, Pere Altimira — Out of Sync |
| Best Actress: Maria Morera — Libertad; Vicky Luengo — Girlfriends; Begoña Vargas — Outlaws; Marta Nieto — Out of Sync | Best Actor: Mohamed Mellali — The Odd-Job Men; Roger Casamajor — The Belly of the Sea; Chechu Salgado — Outlaws; Eduard Fernández — Mediterraneo: The Law of the Sea |
| Best Production Supervision: Albert Espel, Kostas Seakianakis — Mediterraneo: The Law of the Sea; Bàrbara Ferrer — The Belly of the Sea; Goretti Pagès — Outlaws; Bernat Rifé, Goretti Pagès — The Odd-Job Men | Best Documentary Film: El retorn: la vida després de l'ISIS; Balandrau, infern glaçat; El niño de fuego; Un blues per a Teheran |
| Best Animation Film: Mironins | Best Short Film: Farrucas; Animal salvatge; Facunda; L'estrany |
| Best Television Film: Frederica Montseny, la dona que parla; Berenàveu a les fosques; Tocats pel foc; Un mundo para Julius | Best Art Direction: Balter Gallart — Outlaws; Laia Colet — Love Gets a Room; Susy Gómez — The Belly of the Sea; Marta Bazaco — Libertad |
| Best Editing: Neus Ballús, Ariadna Ribas — The Odd-Job Men; Bernat Aragonés — The Belly of the Sea; Mapa Pastor — Outlaws; Ana Pfaff — Libertad | Best Cinematography: Gris Jordana — Libertad; Josep M. Civit, Blai Tomàs — The Belly of the Sea; Carles Gusi — Outlaws; Kiko de la Rica — Mediterraneo: The Law of the Sea |
| Best Supporting Actress: Ángela Cervantes — Girlfriends; Nora Navas — Libertad; Vicky Peña — Libertad; Anna Castillo — Mediterraneo: The Law of the Sea | Best Supporting Actor: Valero Escolar — The Odd-Job Men; Sergi López — Mediterraneo: The Law of the Sea; Àlex Monner — Mediterraneo: The Law of the Sea; Miki Esparbé — Out of Sync |
| Best Original Music: Arnau Bataller — Mediterraneo: The Law of the Sea; Marcús JGR — The Belly of the Sea; Derby Motoreta's Burrito Kachimba — Outlaws; Paul Tyan — Libertad | Best Costume Design: Vinyet Escobar — Outlaws; Alberto Valcárcel — Love Gets a Room; Susy Gómez, Pau Aulí — The Belly of the Sea; Alba Costa — The Odd-Job Men |
| Best Sound: Daniel Fontrodona, Oriol Tarragó, Marc Bech, Marc Orts — Out of Sync; Isaac Bonfill, Oriol Tarragó, Marc Orts — Outlaws; Eva Valiño, Fabiola Ordoyo, Yasmina Praderas — Mediterraneo: The Law of the Sea; Amanda Villavieja, Elena Coderch, Albert Manera — The Odd-Job Men | Best Visual Effects: Àlex Villagrasa — Mediterraneo: The Law of the Sea; Lluís Rivera, Lluís Castells — Below Zero; Anna Aragonès — The Belly of the Sea; Raúl Romanillos, Míriam Piquer — Outlaws |
| Best Makeup and Hairstyles: Sarai Rodríguez, Nacho Díaz, Benjamín Pérez — Outlaws; Montse Boqueras — Girlfriends; Alma Casal — The Belly of the Sea; Barbara Broucke, Jesús Martos — Libertad | Best European Film: Another Round; Annette; Quo Vadis, Aida?; Titane |

=== Public's Choice Special Award ===
- Mediterraneo: The Law of the Sea
  - The Belly of the Sea
  - The Odd-Job Men
  - Tros
  - Visitor
  - Outlaws
  - Libertad
  - Out of Sync

=== Honorary Award ===
Cinematographer Tomàs Pladevall was selected as the recipient of the Gaudí honorary award.
