= The Belly of the Sea =

- Poster
- Catalan: El ventre del mar
- Directed by: Agustí Villaronga
- Written by: Agustí Villaronga
- Based on: Ocean Sea by Alessandro Baricco
- Produced by: Cesc Mulet; Javier Pérez Santana
- Starring: Roger Casamajor; Òscar Kapoya
- Cinematography: Blai Tomàs; Josep María Civit
- Edited by: Bernat Aragonés
- Production companies: Testamento P.C.T. La Perifèrica Produccions; Productions Link-Up; Turkana Films; Bastera Films
- Distributed by: Elastica Films; Filmin
- Release dates: April 2021 (MIFF); 12 November 2021 (Spain)
- Running time: 76 minutes
- Country: Spain
- Language: Catalan

The Belly of the Sea (Catalan: El ventre del mar) is a 2021 Spanish drama film directed and written by Agustí Villaronga, based on the novel Ocean Sea by Italian writer Alessandro Baricco. It was shot in black and white and stars Roger Casamajor and Òscar Kapoya.

== Plot ==
In June, 1816, the French frigate Alliance runs aground off the coast of Senegal. Without enough boats for everyone, a raft is built to tow 147 men to shore. But panic and confusion seize the convoy and cut the tow rope, abandoning the raft to its fate. Hunger, madness and a fierce fight break out on that drifting raft. Savigny, a ruthless medical officer, and Thomas, a rebellious private sailor, face each other with a different attitude to survive. A horror that lasted for days and days. A scene where the greatest of cruelties and the sweetest of pieties were shown.

== Cast ==
- Roger Casamajor as Savigny
- Òscar Kapoya as Thomas
- Muminu Diayo as Thèrese
- Marc Bonnín as Markus

== Production ==
The Belly of the Sea was produced by Testamento and La Perifèrica Produccions alongside Turkana Films, Link-up Barcelona and Bastera Films, with the participation of IB3 and TV3, funding from the ICAA, support from the ICEC, and the sponsoring of Fundació Mallorca Turisme and the Mallorca Film Commission. It was fully shot in the island of Mallorca.

== Release ==
The film made its world premiere at the 43rd Moscow International Film Festival (MIFF) in April 2021 as part of the official competition. In June 2021, it also screened at the Málaga Spanish Film Festival (FMCE), where it won six awards including the Golden Biznaga for Best Spanish Film. It was likewise presented at the 69th San Sebastián International Film Festival, screened as part of the 'Made in Spain' section. Distributed by Elastica Films and Filmin, it was released in Spain on 12 November 2021.

== Critical reception ==
On review aggregator website Rotten Tomatoes, the film holds an approval rating of 60% based on 5 reviews, with an average rating of 5.80. Javier Ocaña from El País commented "it's not an easy film, although it is a relevant study on cowardice and ineptitude, abandonment and forgetfulness, which unfortunately extends through the ages". Writing for Fotogramas, Beatriz Martínez rated the film four out of five stars, marvelling how, with a very low budget, Villaronga managed to create a masterpiece.

=== Awards and nominations ===
Year	Award	Category	Nominee(s)	Result	Ref.
2021	43rd Moscow International Film Festival	Critics's Jury Award	The Belly of the Sea	Won	
2021	24th Málaga Film Festival	Golden Biznaga for Best Spanish Film	The Belly of the Sea	Won	
2021	24th Málaga Film Festival	Silver Biznaga for Best Director	Agustí Villaronga	Won	
2021	24th Málaga Film Festival	Silver Biznaga for Best Screenplay	Agustí Villaronga	Won	
2021	24th Málaga Film Festival	Silver Biznaga for Best Actor	Roger Casamajor	Won	
2021	24th Málaga Film Festival	Silver Biznaga for Best Score	Marcús J.G.R.	Won	
2021	24th Málaga Film Festival	Silver Biznaga for Best Cinematography	Josep María Civit and Blai Tòmas	Won	
2022	9th Feroz Awards	Arrebato Award (fiction film)		Nominated	
2022	77th CEC Medals	Best Adapted Screenplay	Agustí Villaronga	Nominated	
2022	36th Goya Awards	Best Adapted Screenplay	Agustí Villaronga	Nominated	
2022	14th Gaudí Awards	Best Film		Nominated	
2022	14th Gaudí Awards	Best Director	Agustí Villaronga	Nominated	
2022	14th Gaudí Awards	Best Screenplay	Agustí Villaronga	Nominated	
2022	14th Gaudí Awards	Best Actor	Roger Casamajor	Nominated	
2022	14th Gaudí Awards	Best Production Supervision	Bàrbara Ferrer	Nominated	
2022	14th Gaudí Awards	Best Art Direction	Susy Gómez	Nominated	
2022	14th Gaudí Awards	Best Editing	Bernat Aragonés	Nominated	
2022	14th Gaudí Awards	Best Original Music	Marcús JGR	Nominated	
2022	14th Gaudí Awards	Best Cinematography	Josep M. Civit, Blai Tomàs	Nominated	
2022	14th Gaudí Awards	Best Costume Design	Susy Gómez, Pau Aulí	Nominated	
2022	14th Gaudí Awards	Best Visual Effects	Anna Aragonès	Nominated	
2022	14th Gaudí Awards	Best Makeup and Hairstyles	Alma Casal	Nominated	
2022	14th Gaudí Awards	Public's Choice Special Award for Best Film		Nominated	

== See also ==
- List of Spanish films of 2021
