= 36th Goya Awards =

Spanish film awards

- Date: 12 February 2022
- Site: Palau de les Arts Reina Sofía, Valencia
- Directed by: Dani de la Torre
- Organized by: Academy of Cinematographic Arts and Sciences of Spain

Highlights
- Best Film: The Good Boss
- Best Direction: Fernando León de Aranoa; The Good Boss
- Best Actor: Javier Bardem; The Good Boss
- Best Actress: Blanca Portillo; Maixabel
- Most awards: The Good Boss (6)
- Most nominations: The Good Boss (20)

Television coverage
- Network: La 1
- Viewership: 2.78 million (22.9%)

The 36th Goya Awards ceremony, presented by the Academy of Cinematographic Arts and Sciences (AACCE), honoured the best in Spanish films of 2021 and took place at the Palau de les Arts Reina Sofía in Valencia on 12 February 2022. The ceremony was broadcast by RTVE on La1, TVE Internacional, RTVE Play and RNE.

The shortlists for every category were unveiled on early November, with 160 films being selected to compete. Nominations were read by actors Nathalie Poza and José Coronado on 29 November 2021. The Good Boss received the most nominations with a record-breaking twenty. It was followed by Maixabel, with fourteen nominations, and Parallel Mothers, with eight.

The Good Boss won six awards including Best Film, Best Director for Fernando León de Aranoa, Best Actor for Javier Bardem and Best Original Screenplay.

A new non competitive award that honors personalities from international cinema was introduced for the first time. The first honoree was Australian actress Cate Blanchett. The gala was directed by Dani de la Torre and the screenplay was penned by Bárbara Alpuente, Ángela Armero, Nuria Roca and Alberto López. It featured performances by Joaquín Sabina, Leiva, C. Tangana and Luz Casal. It was the first time that the ceremony was held in Valencia.

== Winners and nominees ==
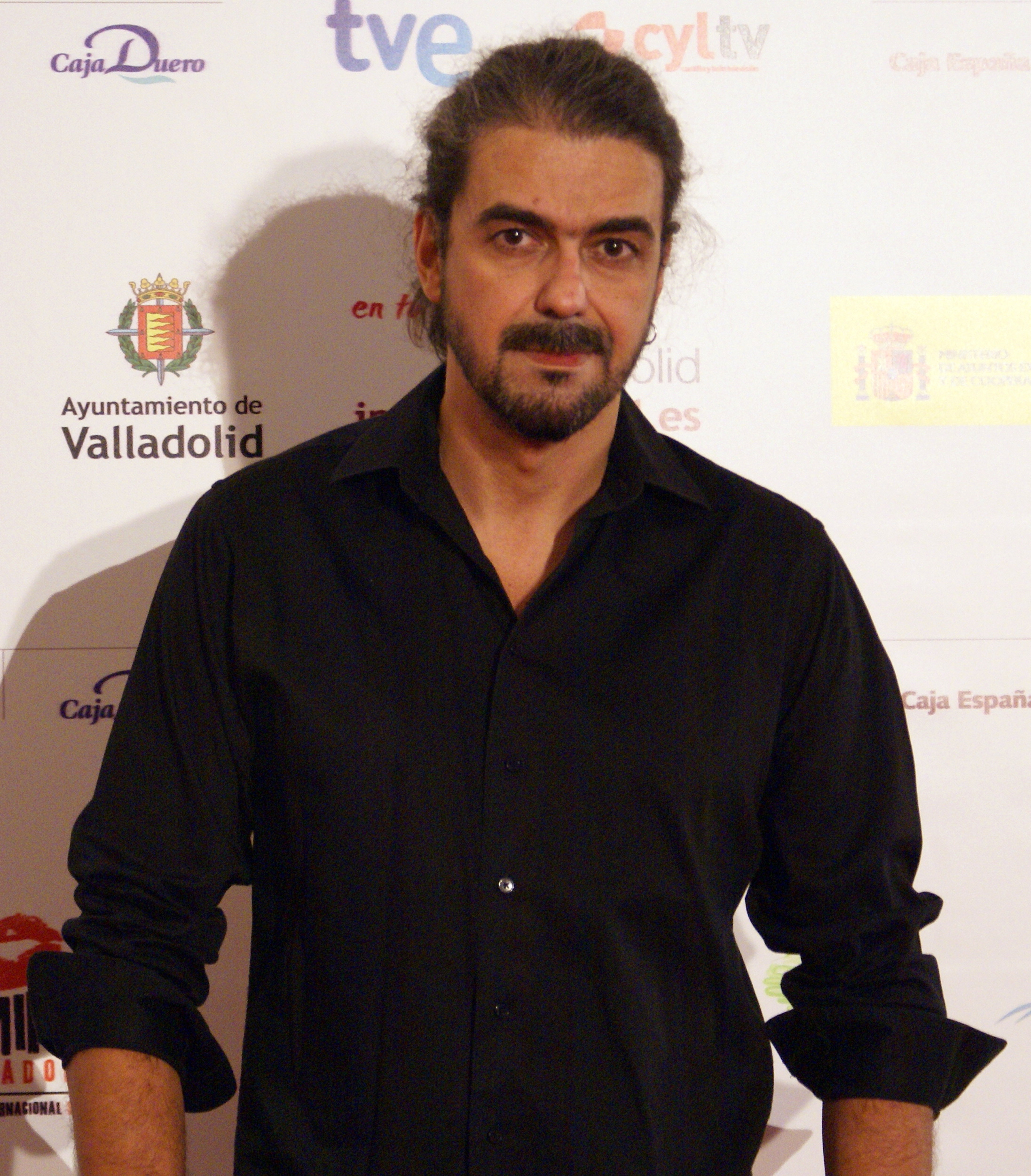
Fernando León de Aranoa, Best Director and Best Original Screenplay winner.

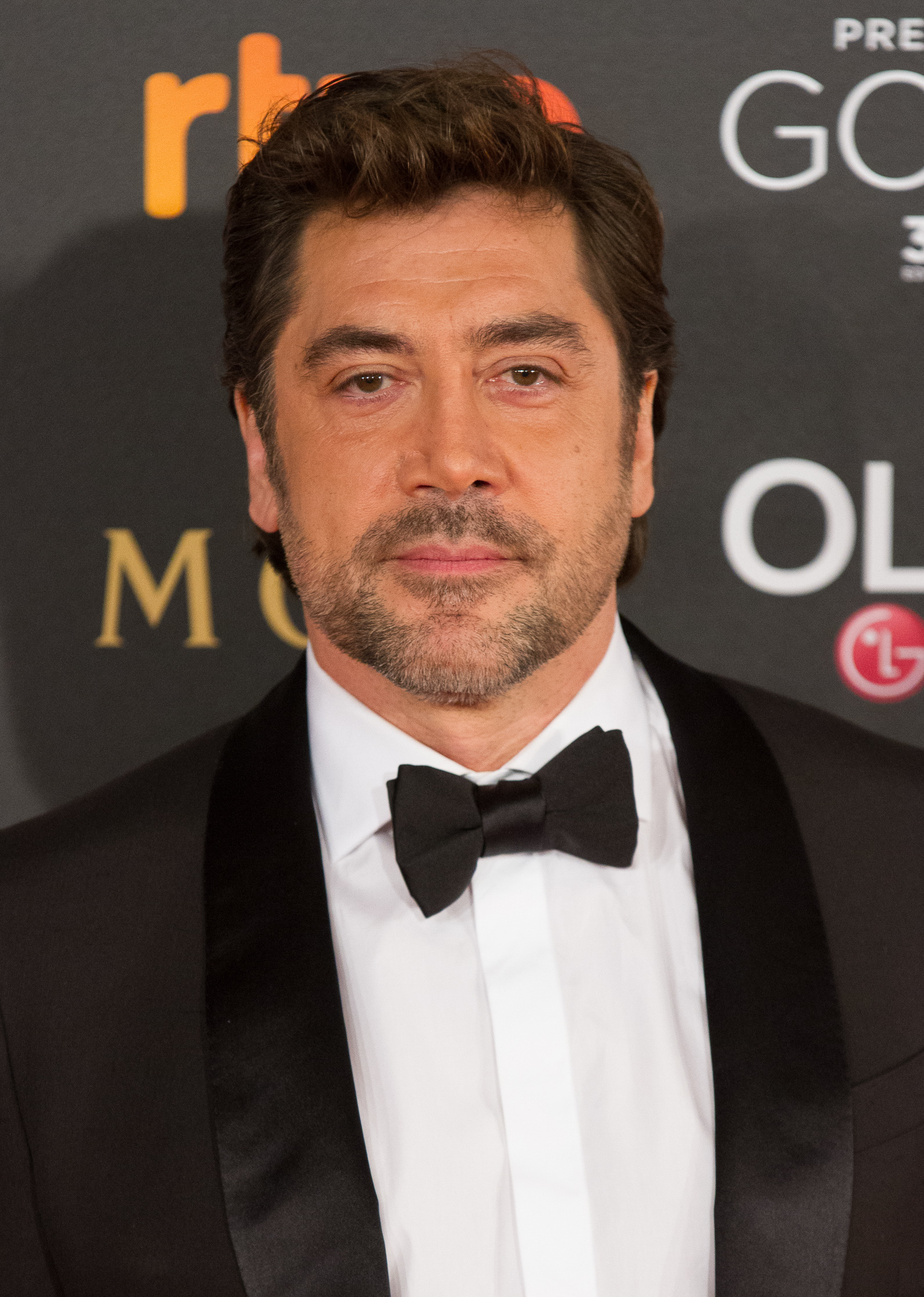
Javier Bardem, Best Actor winner.

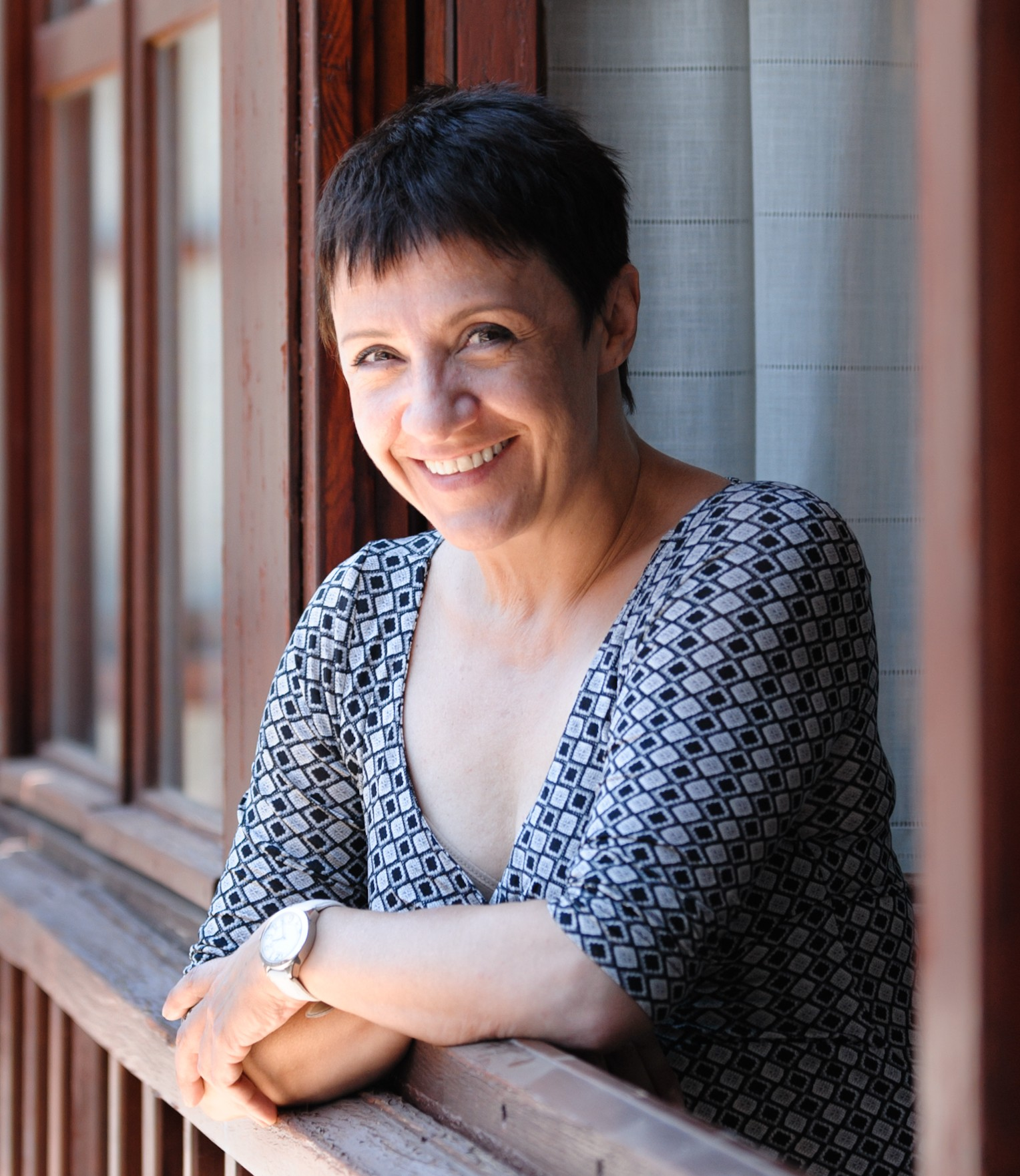
Blanca Portillo, Best Actress winner.

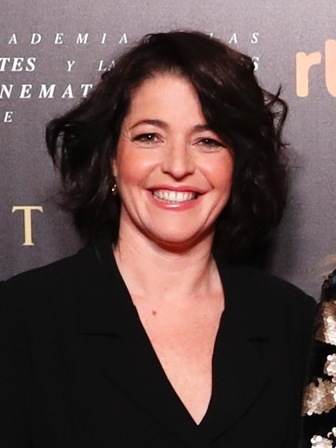
Nora Navas, Best Supporting Actress winner.

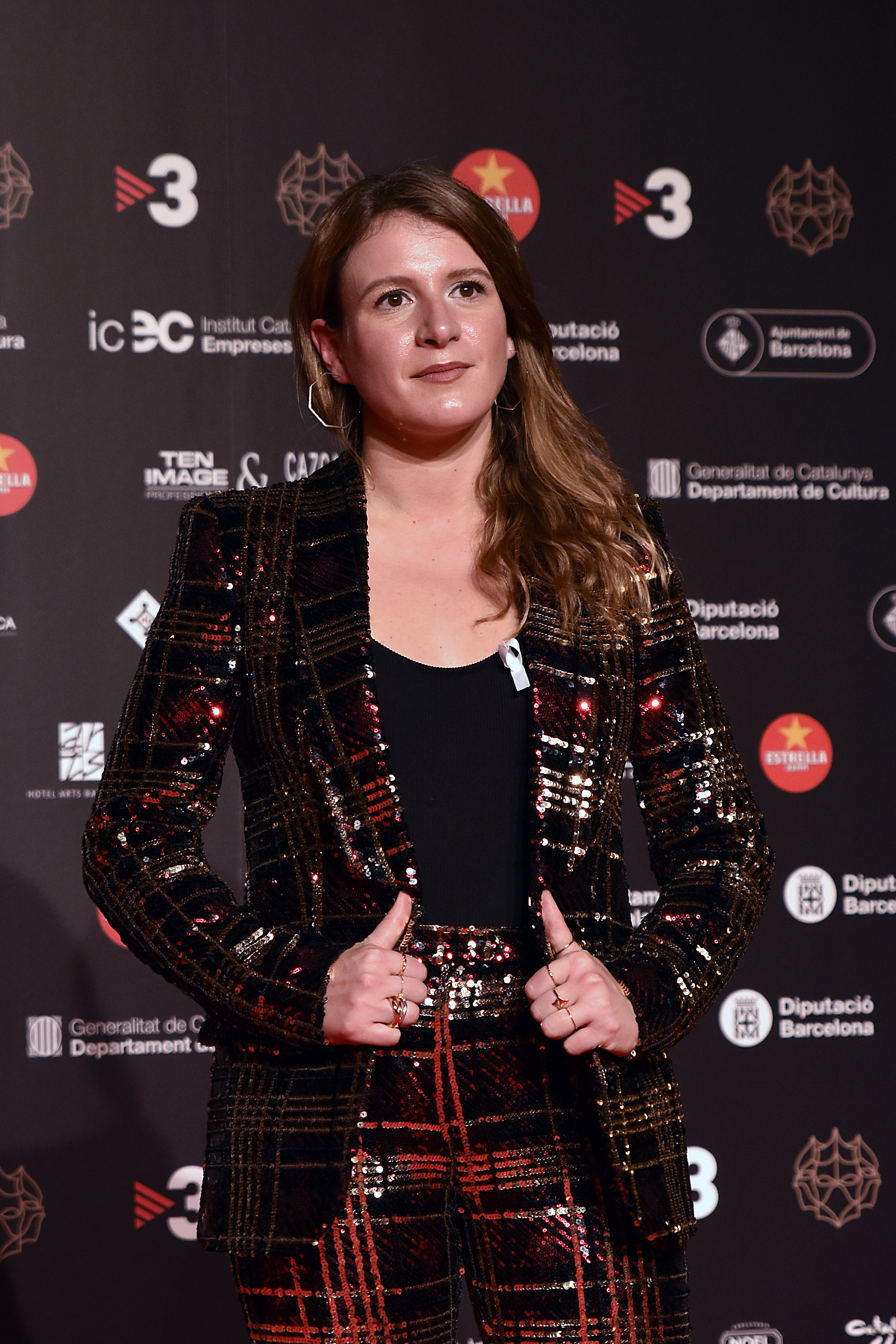
Best New Director winner, Clara Roquet.

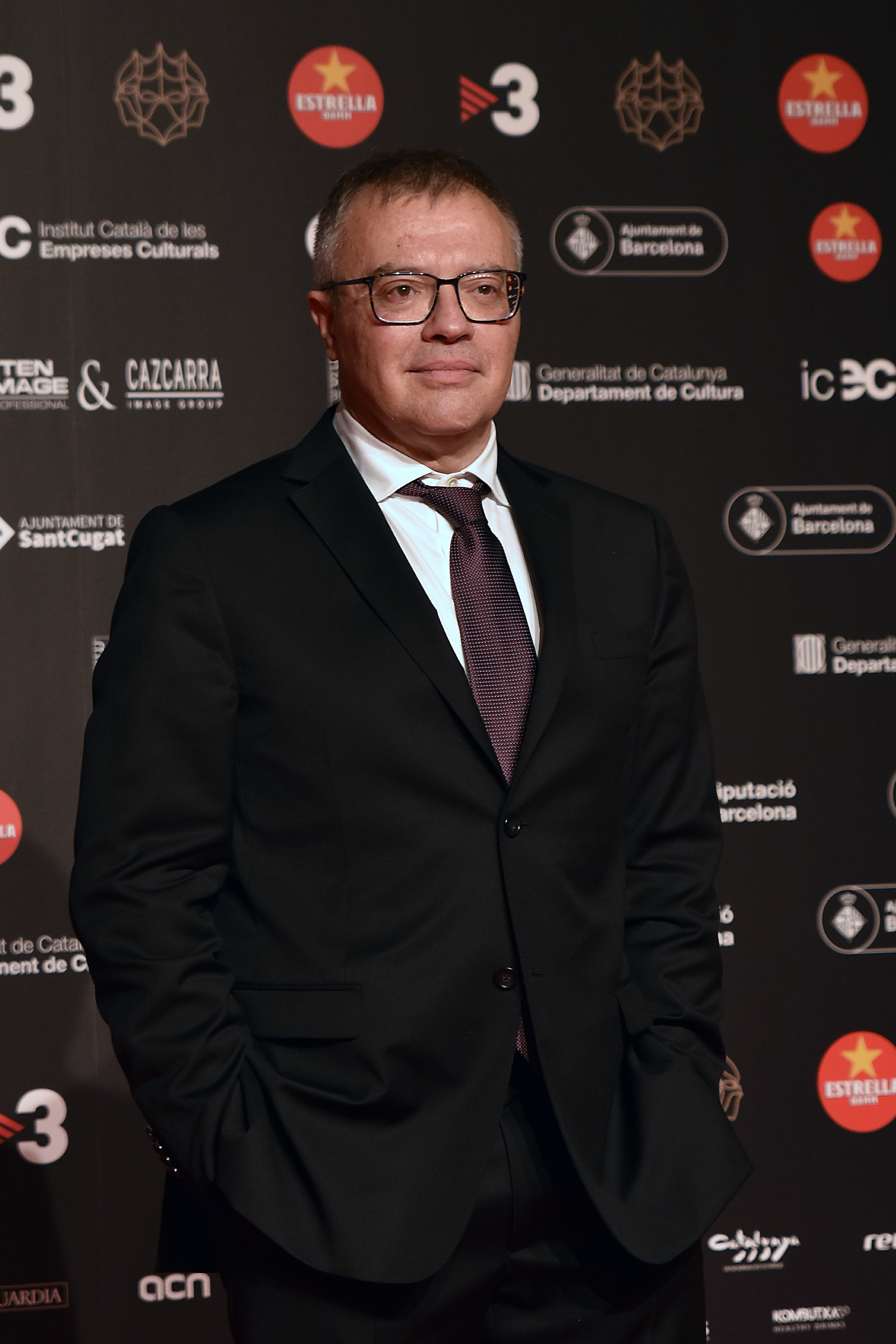
Daniel Monzón, Best Adapted Screenplay co-winner.

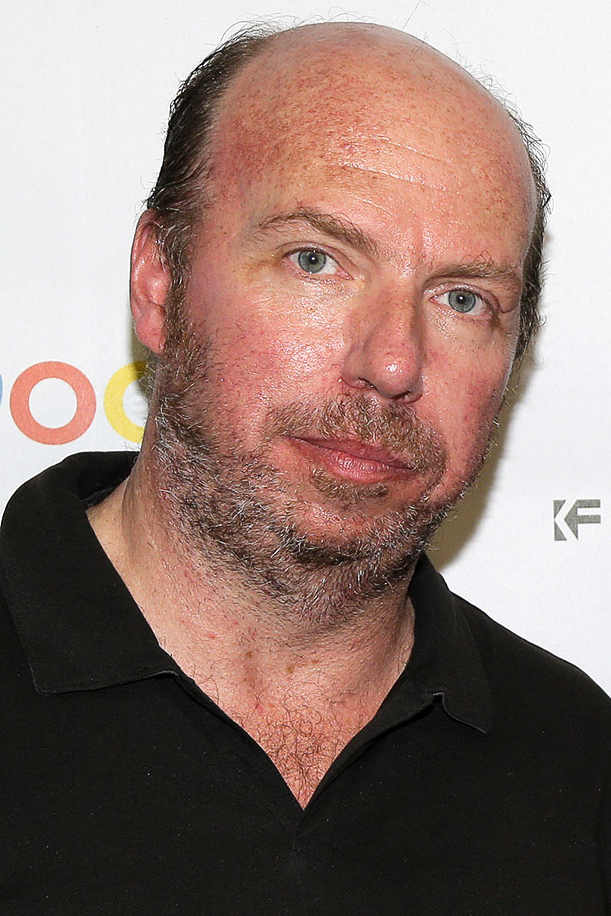
Jorge Guerricaechevarria, Best Adapted Screenplay co-winner.

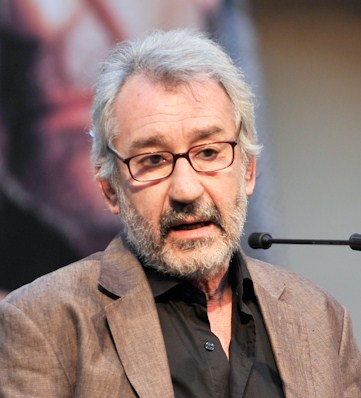
José Sacristán, Honorary Goya recipient.

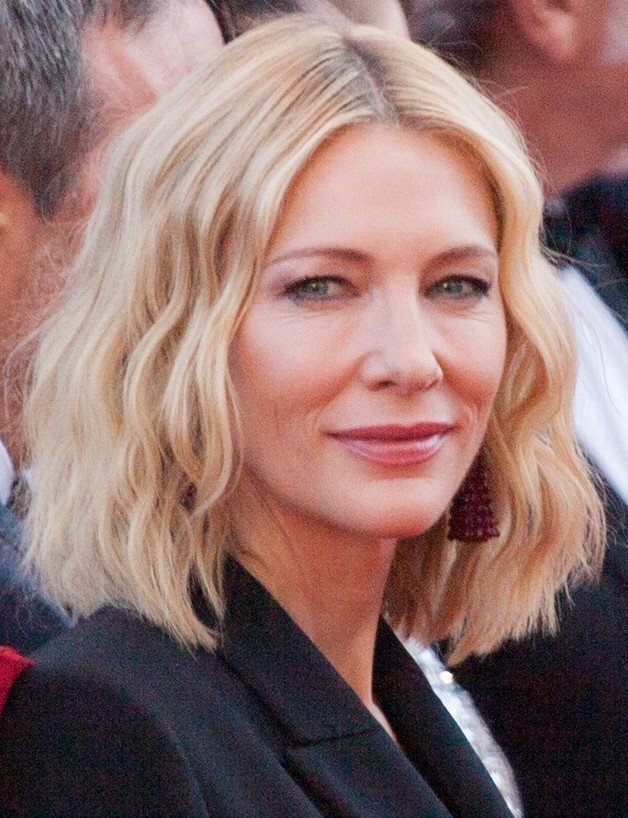
Cate Blanchett, International Honorary Goya recipient.

Best Film: The Good Boss; Maixabel; Libertad; Parallel Mothers; Mediterraneo: The Law of the Sea	Best Director: Fernando León de Aranoa – The Good Boss; Manuel Martín Cuenca – The Daughter; Icíar Bollaín — Maixabel; Pedro Almodóvar — Parallel Mothers
Best Actor: Javier Bardem — The Good Boss as Julio Blanco; Javier Gutiérrez — The Daughter as Javier; Eduard Fernández — Mediterraneo: The Law of the Sea as Òscar Camps; Luis Tosar — Maixabel as Ibon Etxezarreta	Best Actress: Blanca Portillo — Maixabel as Maixabel Lasa; Emma Suárez — Josephine as Berta; Petra Martínez — That Was Life as María; Penélope Cruz — Parallel Mothers as Janis Martínez Moreno
Best Supporting Actor: Urko Olazabal — Maixabel as Luis Carrasco; Fernando Albizu — The Good Boss as Román; Celso Bugallo — The Good Boss as Fortuna; Manolo Solo — The Good Boss as Miralles	Best Supporting Actress: Nora Navas — Libertad as Teresa; Sonia Almarcha — The Good Boss as Adela; Aitana Sánchez-Gijón — Parallel Mothers as Teresa Ferreras; Milena Smit — Parallel Mothers as Ana Manso Ferreras
Best New Actor: Chechu Salgado — Outlaws as Zarco; Óscar de la Fuente — The Good Boss as José; Tarik Rmili — The Good Boss as Khaled; Jorge Motos — Lucas as Lucas	Best New Actress: María Cerezuela — Maixabel as María; Ángela Cervantes — Girlfriends as Soraya; Almudena Amor — The Good Boss as Liliana; Nicolle García — Libertad as Libertad
Best Original Screenplay: Fernando León de Aranoa —The Good Boss; Clara Roquet — Libertad; Icíar Bollaín, Isa Campo — Maixabel; Juanjo Giménez Peña, Pere Altimira — Out of Sync	Best Adapted Screenplay: Daniel Monzón, Jorge Guerricaechevarría — Outlaws; based on the novel Las leyes de la frontera by Javier Cercas; Júlia de Paz Solvas, Núria Dunjó López — Ama; based on the short film of the same name by Júlia de la Paz; Agustí Villaronga — The Belly of the Sea; based on the novel Ocean Sea by Alessandro Baricco; Benito Zambrano, Cristina Campos — Lemon and Poppy Seed Cake; based on the novel of the same name by Cristina Campos
Best Ibero-American Film: The Cordillera of Dreams · Chile; Song Without a Name · Peru; The Siamese Bond · Argentina; Los Lobos · Mexico	Best European Film: Another Round · Denmark; Bye Bye Morons · France; I'm Your Man · Germany; Promising Young Woman · United Kingdom
Best New Director: Clara Roquet – Libertad; Carol Rodríguez Colás – Girlfriends; Javier Marco Rico – Josephine; David Martín de los Santos – That Was Life	Best Animated Film: Valentina; Gora Automatikoa; Mironins; Salvar el árbol (Zutik!)
Best Cinematography: Kiko de la Rica — Mediterraneo: The Law of the Sea; Pau Esteve Birba — The Good Boss; Gris Jordana — Libertad; José Luis Alcaine — Parallel Mothers	Best Editing: Vanessa L. Marimbert — The Good Boss; Antonio Frutos – Below Zero; Miguel Doblado – Josephine; Nacho Ruiz Capillas – Maixabel
Best Art Direction: Balter Gallart — Outlaws; César Macarrón — The Good Boss; Antxón Gómez — Parallel Mothers; Mikel Serrano — Maixabel	Best Production Supervision: Albert Espel, Kostas Seakianakis — Mediterraneo: The Law of the Sea; Óscar Vigiola — Love Gets a Room; Luis Gutiérrez — The Good Boss; Guadalupe Balaguer Trelles — Maixabel
Best Sound: Dani Fontrodona, Oriol Tarragó, Marc Bech, Marc Orts — Out of Sync; Iván Marín, Pelayo Gutiérrez, Valeria Arcieri — The Good Boss; Sergio Bürmann, Laia Casanovas, Marc Orts — Parallel Mothers; Alazne Ameztoy, Juan Ferro, Candela Palencia — Maixabel	Best Special Effects: Pau Costa, Laura Pedro — The Vault; Raúl Romanillos, Míriam Piquer — The Good Boss; Raúl Romanillos, Ferran Piquer — The Grandmother; Àlex Villagrasa — Mediterraneo: The Law of the Sea
Best Costume Design: Vinyet Escobar — Outlaws; Alberto Valcárcel — Love Gets a Room; Fernando García — The Good Boss; Clara Bilbao — Maixabel	Best Makeup and Hairstyles: Sarai Rodríguez, Benjamín Pérez, Nacho Díaz — Outlaws; Almudena Fonseca, Manolo García — The Good Boss; Eli Adánez, Sergio Pérez Berbel, Nacho Díaz — Libertad; Karmele Soler, Sergio Pérez Berbel — Maixabel
Best Original Score: Zeltia Montes — The Good Boss; Fatima Al Qadiri — The Grandmother; Alberto Iglesias — Maixabel; Arnau Bataller — Mediterraneo: The Law of the Sea	Best Original Song: "Te espera el mar" by María José Llergo – Mediterraneo: The Law of the Sea; "Burst Out" by Àngel Leiro, Jean-Paul Dupeyron, Xavier Capellas – Álbum de posguerra; "Que me busquen por dentro" by Antonio Orozco, Jordi Colell Pinillos – The Cover; "Las leyes de la frontera" by Alejandro García Rodríguez, Antonio Molinero León, Daniel Escortell Blandino, José Manuel Cabrera Escot, Miguel García Cantero – Outlaws
Best Fictional Short Film: Tótem loba; Farrucas; Mindanao; Votamos; Yalla	Best Animated Short Film: The Monkey; Nacer; Proceso de selección; Umbrellas
Best Documentary Film: Who's Stopping Us; The Return: Life After ISIS; Heroes. Silence and Rock and Roll; Tehran Blues	Best Documentary Short Film: Mama; Dajla: cine y olvido; Figurante; Ulisses

=== Honorary Goya ===
- José Sacristán

=== International Honorary Goya ===
- Cate Blanchett

=== Films with multiple nominations and awards ===
Films that received multiple nominations
Nominations	Film
20	The Good Boss
14	Maixabel
8	Parallel Mothers
7	Mediterraneo: The Law of the Sea
6	Libertad
6	Outlaws
3	Josephine
2	Girlfriends
2	Love Gets a Room
2	The Grandmother
2	The Daughter
2	That Was Life
2	Out of Sync

Films that received multiple awards
Awards	Film
6	The Good Boss
5	Outlaws
3	Maixabel
3	Mediterraneo: The Law of the Sea
2	Libertad

== Presenters and performers ==
The following individuals, listed in order of appearance, presented awards or performed musical numbers.

=== Presenters ===
- Carmen Machi – introduced the ceremony
- Charo López – presented Best Sound
- Belén Rueda – presented Best Costume Design
- Vicky Peña – presented Best Art Direction
- Juana Acosta – presented Best Production Supervision
- Najwa Nimri – presented Best Makeup and Hairstyles
- Adam Nourou, Jaime Lorente and Paula Usero – presented Best New Actress and Best New Actor
- Pedro Almodóvar and Penélope Cruz – presented the International Goya Award to Cate Blanchett
- Salvador Calvo – presented Best Fictional Short Film
- Mabel Lozano – presented Best Documentary Short Film
- Eduardo Casanova – presented Best Animated Short Film
- Mina El Hammani, Michelle Jenner and Rozalén – presented Best Original Score and Best Original Song
- Pilar Palomero and Belén Funes – presented Best New Director
- Belén Cuesta, Inma Cuesta and Luis Zahera – presented Best Supporting Actress and Best Supporting Actor
- Macarena Gómez – presented Best Cinematography
- Guillermo Montesinos – presented Best Editing
- Ana Rubio – presented Best Special Effects
- Álvaro Morte, Óscar Jaenada and Valérie Delpierre – presented Best European Film and Best Ibero-American Film
- Ana Milán, Arturo Valls and Marta González de Vega – presented Best Adapted Screenplay and Best Original Screenplay
- Rosana Pastor – introduced the annual "In Memoriam" tribute
- Bárbara Lennie, Irene Escolar and Luis López Carrasco – presented Best Documentary Film and Best Animated Film
- Nora Navas – presented the Honorary Goya Award to José Sacristán
- Nathalie Poza and Patricia López Arnaiz – presented Best Actor
- Juan Diego Botto and Paco León - presented Best Actress
- Marián Álvarez and Sahraa Karimi - presented Best Director
- Ángela Molina - presented Best Film

=== Performers ===
Artist	Performed
Bebe; Jedet; Cristina Castaño	"Libre"
C. Tangana; Rita Payés	"Te venero"
Joaquín Sabina; Leiva	"Tan joven y tan viejo"
Luz Casal	"Negra sombra" during the annual "In Memoriam" tribute
