= Libertad (film) =

- Theatrical release poster
- Directed by: Clara Roquet
- Written by: Clara Roquet
- Starring: María Morera; Nicolle García; Nora Navas; Carol Hurtado; Vicky Peña
- Cinematography: Gris Jordana
- Production companies: Lastor Media; Avalon P.C.; Bulletproof Cupid
- Distributed by: Avalon; Elastica
- Release dates: 8 July 2021 (Cannes); 19 November 2021 (Spain)
- Countries: Spain; Belgium
- Language: Spanish

Libertad is a 2021 Spanish-Belgian coming-of-age drama film directed and written by Clara Roquet which stars María Morera and Nicolle García, also featuring Nora Navas, Carol Hurtado and Vicky Peña.

== Plot ==
A coming-of-age story portraying class struggle from the point of view of the privileged class, the fiction follows the friendship between Nora (a rich privileged girl) and Libertad (the daughter of Rosana, the family's Colombian domestic worker), as the former spends the holidays at her grandmother Ángela's summerhouse in the Costa Brava.

== Cast ==
- Maria Morera as Nora
- Nicolle García as Libertad
- Nora Navas as Teresa
- Carol Hurtado as Rosana
- Vicky Peña as Ángela
- Maria Rodríguez Soto
- David Selvas
- Òscar Muñoz
- Sergi Torrecilla
- Mathilde Legrand

== Production ==
Libertad (Clara Roquet's debut feature film) is a joint Spain–Belgium co-production and it was produced by Lastor Media and Avalon P.C. alongside Bulletproof Cupid with support from MEDIA, ICAA, ICEC, Eurimages, RTVE, TV3, Movistar+ and Catalan Films.

Filmed in Catalonia in the Summer of 2019, shooting locations included Barcelona, Blanes, Garraf, Lloret de Mar and Sant Andreu de Llavaneres.

== Release ==
The film had its world premiere in the 60th Critics' Week at the 2021 Cannes Film Festival on 8 July 2021. It also screened as the opening film of the 66th Valladolid International Film Festival (Seminci) on 23 October 2021. Co-distributed by Avalon and Elastica, it was theatrically released in Spain on 19 November 2021.

== Reception ==
Eulàlia Iglesias of Fotogramas gave Libertad 4 out of 5 stars, deeming it to be "a debut film that brings to the surface with remarkable subtlety an everyday inequality". She highlighted María Morera and Nicolle García, whereas she negatively pointed out that the choice of characters exclusively speaking Spanish felt forced.

Beatriz Martínez of El Periódico de Catalunya gave the film 4 out of 5 stars, presenting it as "a perfectly woven story about class differences, inequalities, mother-son relationships, teen friendship and the youthful yearning to discover the world".

Philippe Engel of Cinemanía gave it 4½ out of 5 stars, considering that Roquet "constructs a prodigious visual and sound montage".

Anton Merikaetxebarria of El Correo gave the film 2 out of 3 stars, considering that the director resolves the underlying coming-of-age story with the required "sensitivity and good taste".

Reviewing for Mondo Sonoro, J. Picatoste Verdejo, gave it 8 out of 10 points; they presented Libertad as a film about oblique affections, considering however that the entanglement of unrequited affections laid out in the plot is presented in a measured balance.

Wendy Ide of ScreenDaily wrote that Roquet's "filmmaking is light of touch and instinctively perceptive, honing in on the tiny details which are magnified through the lens of adolescence", likening her craft to that of Céline Sciamma and Lucrecia Martel.

== Accolades ==
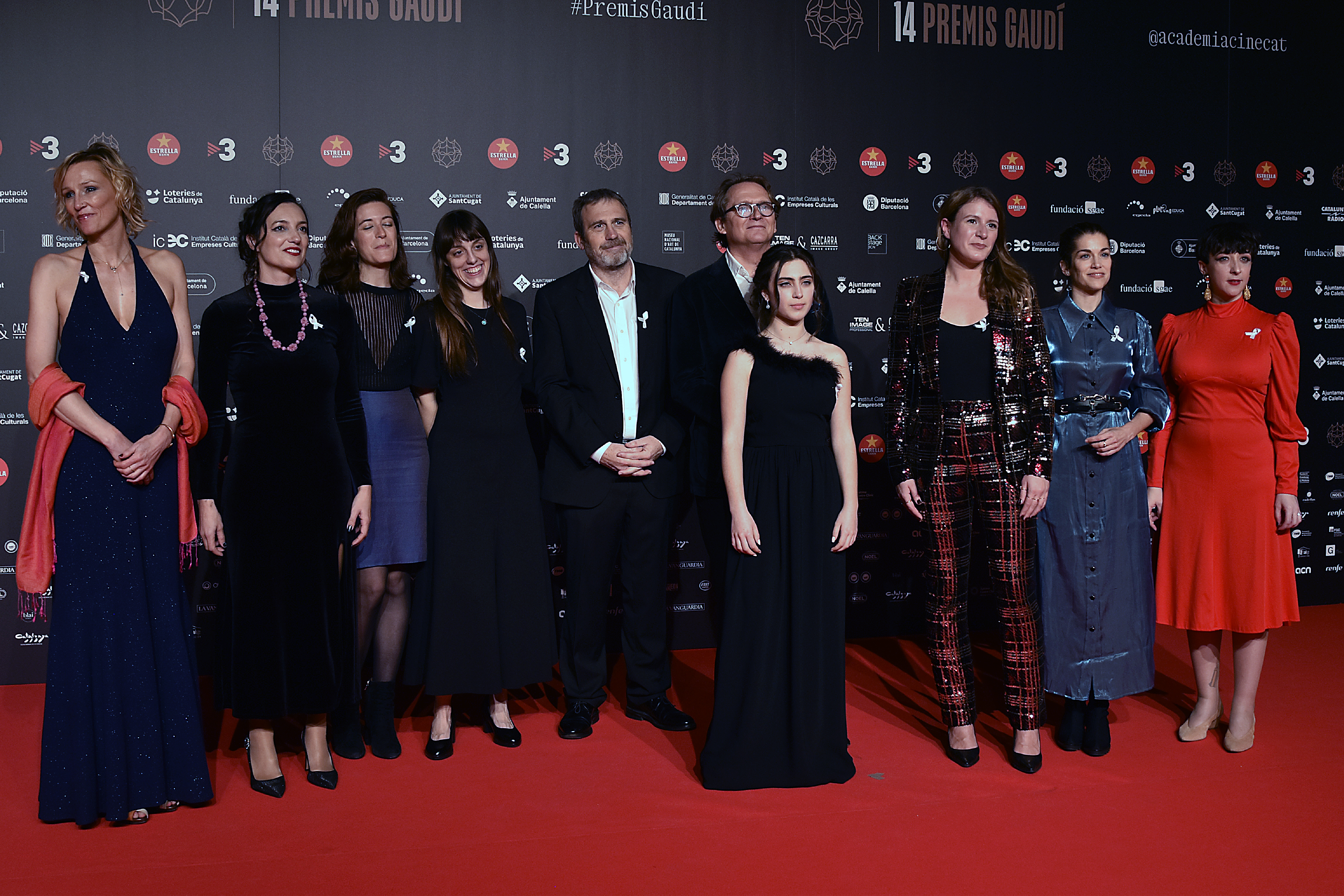
Cast and crew members at the red carpet of the 14th Gaudí Awards.

Year	Award	Category	Nominee(s)	Result	Ref.
2022	9th Feroz Awards	Best Drama Film		Nominated	
2022	9th Feroz Awards	Best Director	Clara Roquet	Nominated	
2022	9th Feroz Awards	Best Screenplay	Clara Roquet	Nominated	
2022	9th Feroz Awards	Best Film Poster	Jordi Trilla	Nominated	
2022	77th CEC Medals	Best Film		Nominated	
2022	77th CEC Medals	Best New Director	Clara Roquet	Nominated	
2022	77th CEC Medals	Best Supporting Actress	Nora Navas	Won	
2022	77th CEC Medals	Best New Actress	Nicolle García	Nominated	
2022	77th CEC Medals	Best Cinematography	Gris Jordana	Nominated	
2022	36th Goya Awards	Best Film		Nominated	
2022	36th Goya Awards	Best New Director	Clara Roquet	Won	
2022	36th Goya Awards	Best Original Screenplay	Clara Roquet	Nominated	
2022	36th Goya Awards	Best Supporting Actress	Nora Navas	Won	
2022	36th Goya Awards	Best New Actress	Nicolle García	Nominated	
2022	36th Goya Awards	Best Cinematography	Gris Jordana	Nominated	
2022	14th Gaudí Awards	Best Non-Catalan Language Film		Won	
2022	14th Gaudí Awards	Best Director	Clara Roquet	Nominated	
2022	14th Gaudí Awards	Best Screenplay	Cara Roquet	Won	
2022	14th Gaudí Awards	Best Actress	Maria Morera	Won	
2022	14th Gaudí Awards	Best Art Direction	Marta Bazaco	Nominated	
2022	14th Gaudí Awards	Best Editing	Ana Pfaff	Nominated	
2022	14th Gaudí Awards	Best Supporting Actress	Nora Navas	Nominated	
2022	14th Gaudí Awards	Best Supporting Actress	Vicky Peña	Nominated	
2022	14th Gaudí Awards	Best Original Music	Paul Tyan	Nominated	
2022	14th Gaudí Awards	Best Cinematography	Gris Jordana	Won	
2022	14th Gaudí Awards	Best Makeup and Hairstyles	Barbara Broucke, Jesús Martos	Nominated	
2022	14th Gaudí Awards	Public's Choice Special Award for Best Film		Nominated	
2022	Spanish Screenwriters' Union Awards	Best Screenplay in a Drama Feature Film	Clara Roquet	Nominated	
2022	9th Platino Awards	Best Ibero-American Debut Feature Film	Clara Roquet	Nominated	

== See also ==
- List of Spanish films of 2021
- List of films that depict class struggle
