= Visitor (2021 film) =

- Catalan release poster
- Catalan: Visitant
- Directed by: Alberto Evangelio
- Screenplay by: Alberto Evangelio
- Starring: Iria del Río; Miquel Fernández; Jan Cornet; Sandra Cervera
- Cinematography: Guillem Oliver
- Production companies: Beniwood Producciones; Chester Media; Desconectada la película AIE; Life & Pictures; The Other Side Films
- Distributed by: Filmax
- Release dates: October 2021 (Sitges); 11 February 2022 (Spain)
- Country: Spain
- Languages: Spanish; Catalan

Visitor (Catalan: Visitant) is a 2021 Spanish horror film with science fiction elements directed by Alberto Evangelio starring Iria del Río, Miquel Fernández, Jan Cornet and Sandra Cervera. Dialogue goes back and forth between Spanish and Valencian.

== Plot ==
The plot tracks Marga, who, in the wake of a couple crisis, moves to the countryside family manor, where an interdimensional gateway is activated as a cube artifact located in the cellar is switched on.

== Cast ==
- Iria del Río as Marga
- Miquel Fernández as Daniel
- Jan Cornet as Carlos
- Sandra Cervera as Diana
- Inma Sancho as Olga
- Carles Sanjaime as Joaquim
- Pep Ricart as Aureli

== Production ==
Visitor is Alberto Evangelio's debut as a feature film director. Penned by Evangelio, the screenplay is based on a story by Evangelio and Marcos Gisbert. Guillem Oliver worked as cinematographer. Visitor is a Beniwood Producciones, Chester Media, Desconectada la película AIE, Life and Pictures and The Other Side Films production. It had the participation of IVC, the Spanish Ministry of Culture, Crea SGR, À Punt Mèdia and TV3.

Filming lasted from August to September 2020. Shooting locations included Puçol, province of Valencia.

== Release ==
The film had its world premiere at the Sitges Film Festival in October 2021. Distributed by Filmax, the film was theatrically released in Spain on 11 February 2022.

== Accolades ==
Year	Award	Category	Nominee(s)	Result	Ref.
2022	14th Gaudí Awards	Best Film		Nominated	
2022	14th Gaudí Awards	Public's Choice Award		Nominated	

== See also ==
- List of Spanish films of 2022
