= Out of Sync (film) =

- Theatrical release poster
- Spanish: Tres
- Directed by: Juanjo Giménez
- Written by: Juanjo Giménez; Pere Altimira
- Produced by: Luisa Romeo
- Starring: Marta Nieto; Miki Esparbé
- Cinematography: Javier Arrontes
- Edited by: Cristóbal Fernández
- Music by: Domas Strupinskas
- Production companies: Frida Films; Nadir Films; M-Films; Manny Films
- Distributed by: Filmax
- Release dates: 5 September 2021 (Venice); 5 November 2021 (Spain); 3 August 2022 (France)
- Running time: 104 minutes
- Countries: Spain; Lithuania; France
- Language: Spanish

Out of Sync (Spanish: Tres) is a 2021 fantasy thriller drama film directed by Juanjo Giménez which stars Marta Nieto and Miki Esparbé. It is a Spanish-Lithuanian-French co-production.

== Premise ==
The brain of C., a sound designer, is beginning to process sound later than visual images. Likewise, she also acquires the ability to hear what had happened in a place she had not been previously.

== Cast ==
- Marta Nieto as C.
- Miki Esparbé as Iván.
- Luisa Merelas as Marga
- Fran Lareu as Pablo
- Julius Cotter as Phil
- Cris Iglesias as Aurora
- Iria Parada as Isa
- Francisco Reyes as intruso
- Carmen Méndez as neuróloga

== Production ==
Tres is a joint Spain–Lithuania–France international co-production, produced by Frida Films, Nadir Films, M-Films and Manny Films. It received help from the ICAA, ICEC, AGADIC, and it had participation of TVG, TV3, Canal+, also receiving funding from MEDIA and Eurimages. It was directed by Juanjo Giménez, who also wrote the screenplay alongside Pere Altimira.

== Release ==
The film made its world premiere at the 18th Venice Days, and it was also screened at the Toronto Film Festival and the Sitges Film Festival. Distributed by Filmax, the film was theatrically released in Spain on 5 November 2021. Le Pacte handles the international sales. It received a 3 August 2022 theatrical release date in France.

== Reception ==
Reviewing for El Periódico de Catalunya, Beatriz Martínez gave Out of Sync 4 out of 5 stars, considering the film to be "an allegory of the loss of links with reality when everything around us crumbles", labelling the number of (different) layers in the film as "prodigious".

Sergi Sánchez of La Razón gave it 5 out of 5 stars, extolling how "it approaches sound with an unusual aesthetic rigour, never forgetting to delve into the emotional journey of its protagonist", while warning that its risky formal proposal may put off more than one viewer.

Carlos Marañón of Cinemanía gave the film 3.5 out of 5 stars, writing that the film proposes "a story underpinned by the opposition between silence and sound", in a manner as effective as it is disquieting, "which brings us back to the simplicity of pure cinema".

Ricardo Rosado of Fotogramas gave the film 4 out of 5 stars, highlighting both 1) the prominence of the film's premise over melodrama; and 2) Marta Nieto, to be the best things about the film.

== Accolades ==
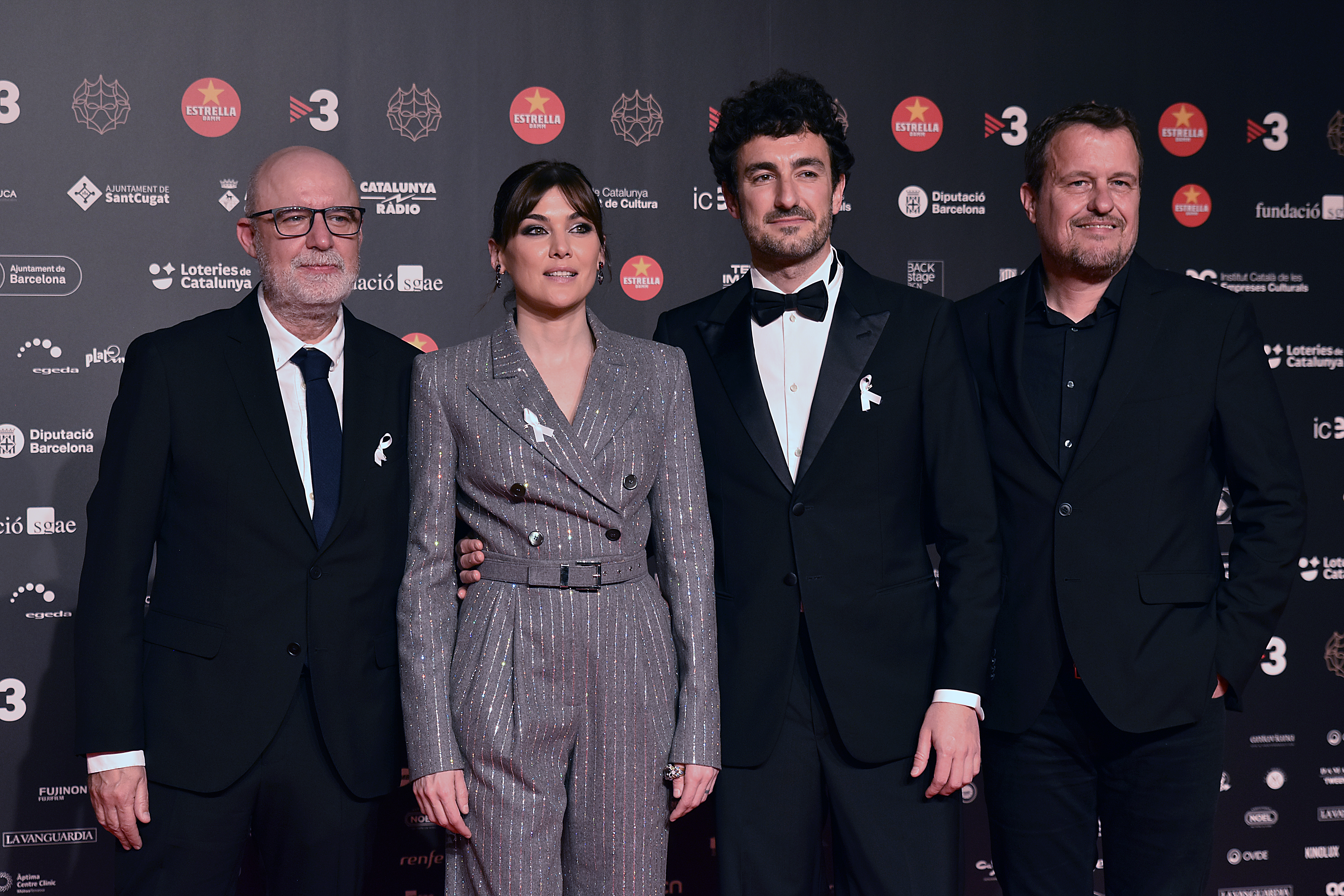
Juanjo Giménez, Marta Nieto, Miki Esparbé and Pere Altimira attending the red carpet of the 14th Gaudí Awards.

| Year | Award | Category | Nominee(s) | Result | Ref. |
|---|---|---|---|---|---|
| 2021 | 27th Forqué Awards | Best Film Actress | Marta Nieto | Nominated | |
| 2022 | 9th Feroz Awards | Best Drama Film | | Nominated | |
| 2022 | 9th Feroz Awards | Best Screenplay | Juanjo Giménez, Pere Altimira | Nominated | |
| 2022 | 9th Feroz Awards | Best Actress (film) | Marta Nieto | Nominated | |
| 2022 | 36th Goya Awards | Best Original Screenplay | Juanjo Giménez Peña & Pere Altimira | Nominated | |
| 2022 | 36th Goya Awards | Best Sound | Daniel Fontrodona, Oriol Tarragó, Marc Bech, Marc Orts | Won | |
| 2022 | 14th Gaudí Awards | Best Non-Catalan Language Film | | Nominated | |
| 2022 | 14th Gaudí Awards | Best Screenplay | Juanjo Giménez, Pere Altimira | Nominated | |
| 2022 | 14th Gaudí Awards | Best Actress | Marta Nieto | Nominated | |
| 2022 | 14th Gaudí Awards | Best Supporting Actor | Miki Esparbé | Nominated | |
| 2022 | 14th Gaudí Awards | Best Sound | Daniel Fontrodona, Oriol Tarragó, Marc Bech, Marc Orts | Won | |
| 2022 | 14th Gaudí Awards | Public's Choice Award for Best Film | | Nominated | |
| 2022 | 20th Mestre Mateo Awards | Best Film | | Won | |
| 2022 | 20th Mestre Mateo Awards | Best Art Direction | Antonio Pereira | Nominated | |
| 2022 | 20th Mestre Mateo Awards | Best Production Supervision | Miriam Devesa | Nominated | |
| 2022 | 20th Mestre Mateo Awards | Best Screenplay | Juanjo Giménez, Pere Altimira | Nominated | |
| 2022 | 20th Mestre Mateo Awards | Best Actress | Marta Nieto | Won | |
| 2022 | 20th Mestre Mateo Awards | Best Sound | Daniel Fontrodona, Oriol Tarragó, Marc Bech, Mart Orts | Won | |
| 2022 | 66th Sant Jordi Awards | Best Debut Feature | | Won | |

== See also ==
- List of Spanish films of 2021
- List of French films of 2022
