= Josephine (2021 film) =

- Theatrical release poster
- Spanish: Josefina
- Directed by: Javier Marco
- Written by: Belén Sánchez-Arévalo
- Starring: Emma Suárez; Roberto Álamo; Miguel Bernardeau; Manolo Solo; Simón Andreu; Pedro Casablanc; Olivia Delcán
- Production companies: White Leaf Producciones; Hoja en Blanco AIE; Achtung Panda! Media GmbH
- Distributed by: Super 8 Distribución
- Release dates: 19 September 2021 (Zinemaldia); 25 October 2021 (Tudela); 5 November 2021 (Spain)
- Countries: Spain; Germany
- Language: Spanish

Josephine (Spanish: Josefina) is a 2021 Spanish-German drama film with comedy elements directed by Javier Marco which stars Emma Suárez and Roberto Álamo, also featuring Miguel Bernardeau, Manolo Solo, Simón Andreu, Pedro Casablanc and Olivia Delcán.

== Plot ==
Every Sunday, Juan (Roberto Álamo), a prison official, observes in silence the visit of Berta (Emma Suárez), the mother of Sergio (Miguel Bernardeau), one of the prisoners. The day he finally manages to approach her, he surprises himself pretending to be another father and inventing a daughter in prison: Josefina. The need to fill the void in which Juan and Berta live leads them to continue meeting beyond the reality that surrounds them.

== Cast ==
- Emma Suárez as Berta Mirador
- Roberto Álamo as Juan
- Miguel Bernardeau as Sergio López Mirador
- Manolo Solo as Rafael
- Mabel Rivera as Eladia
- Simón Andreu as Pascual
- Pedro Casablanc as Emilio
- Olivia Delcán as Josefina
- Belén Ponce de León as Verónica
- Alfonso Desentre as Antonio

== Production ==
Josephine, Javier Marco's feature film debut as a director, was penned by Belén Sánchez-Arévalo. A Spanish-German co-production, the film was produced by White Leaf Producciones alongside Hoja en Blanco AIE and Achtung Panda! Media GmbH, in association with Featurent, with the participation of RTVE, Telemadrid and Castilla La Mancha Media TV and support from ICAA, Crea SGR and ECAM. Shooting lasted from April to May 2021 and it took place in locations across the Madrid region.

== Release ==
The film made its world premiere at the 69th San Sebastián International Film Festival (SIFF) on 19 September 2021. It also screened at the Tudela Opera Prima Festival on 25 October 2021. Distributed by Super 8 Distribución, the film was theatrically released in Spain on 5 November 2021.

== Awards and nominations ==
| Year | Award | Category | Nominee(s) | Result | Ref. |
|---|---|---|---|---|---|
| 2021 | 34th ASECAN Awards | Best Actor | Manolo Solo | Nominated | |
| 2022 | 9th Feroz Awards | Best Actor (film) | Roberto Álamo | Nominated | |
| 2022 | 36th Goya Awards | Best Actress | Emma Suárez | Nominated | |
| 2022 | 36th Goya Awards | Best New Director | Javier Marco | Nominated | |
| 2022 | 36th Goya Awards | Best Editing | Miguel Doblado | Nominated | |

== See also ==
- List of Spanish films of 2021
