= Clara Roquet =

Spanish filmmaker

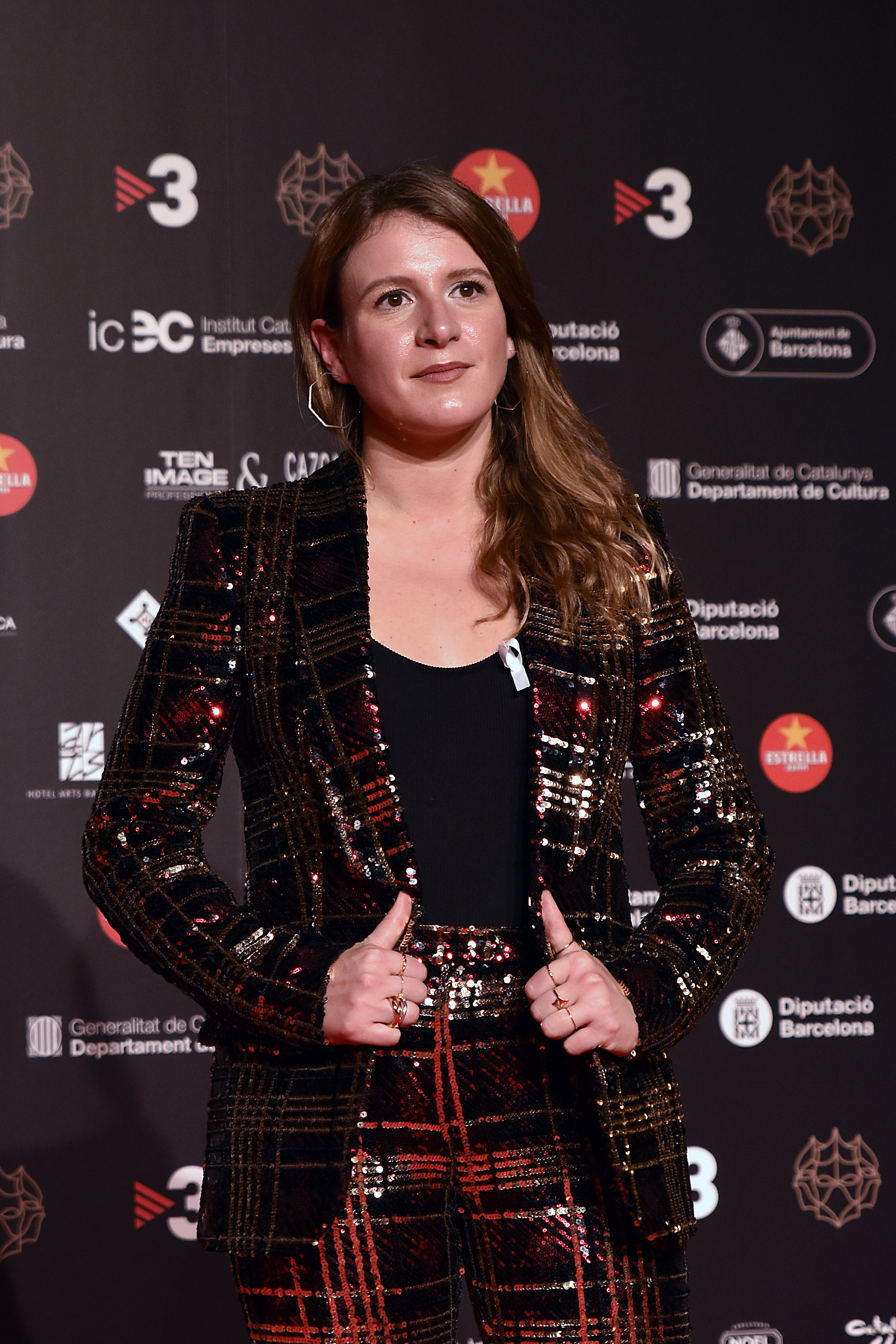
- At the 14th Gaudí Awards in 2022
- Born: 1988; Catalonia, Spain
- Education: Pompeu Fabra University; Columbia University
- Occupations: Screenwriter; film director

Clara Roquet (born 1988) is a Spanish filmmaker from Catalonia.

== Biography ==
Roquet was born in 1988. Reported birthplaces include Malla, Vic, and Barcelona. She studied at the Pompeu Fabra University and Columbia University.

She made her writing debut in the feature film 10,000 km, which she co-wrote with Carlos Marqués-Marcet. She has since written and co-written films such as Petra (2018), The Days to Come (2019), Costa Brava, Lebanon (2021), Creatura (2023), Something Is About to Happen (2023), and The Red Virgin (2024). She made her directorial debut in a feature film with the 2021 drama Libertad.

In 2023 she completed the direction of her adaption of Spanish writer Elia Barceló 2018 novel Las largas sombras for a Disney+ series, Past Lies. The story is based around a group of women who discover the remains of a friend who disappeared two decades before.

== Accolades ==
Year	Award	Category	Work	Result	Ref.
2015	2nd Feroz Awards	Best Screenplay	10,000 km	Nominated	
2019	6th Feroz Awards	Best Screenplay	Petra	Nominated	
2022	9th Feroz Awards	Best Director	Libertad	Nominated	
2022	9th Feroz Awards	Best Screenplay	Libertad	Nominated	
2022	36th Goya Awards	Best New Director	Libertad	Won	
2022	36th Goya Awards	Best Original Screenplay	Libertad	Nominated	
2022	14th Gaudí Awards	Best Director	Libertad	Nominated	
2022	14th Gaudí Awards	Best Screenplay	Libertad	Won	
2022	Spanish Screenwriters' Union Awards	Best Screenplay in a Drama Feature Film	Libertad	Nominated	
2022	9th Platino Awards	Best Ibero-American Debut Feature Film	Libertad	Nominated	
2025	12th Feroz Awards	Best Screenplay in a Film	The Red Virgin	Pending	
