= Girlfriends (2021 film) =

- Theatrical release poster
- Spanish: Chavalas
- Directed by: Carol Rodríguez Colás
- Written by: Marina Rodríguez Colás
- Produced by: Miguel Torrente; Marta Figueras
- Starring: Vicky Luengo; Elisabet Casanovas; Carolina Yuste; Ángela Cervantes
- Cinematography: Juan Carlos Lausín
- Edited by: Pablo Barce
- Music by: Francesc Gener
- Production company: Balance Media Entertainment
- Distributed by: Filmax
- Release dates: 10 June 2021 (Málaga); 3 September 2021 (Spain)
- Running time: 91 minutes
- Country: Spain
- Language: Spanish

Girlfriends (Spanish: Chavalas) is a 2021 Spanish comedy-drama film directed by Carol Rodríguez Colás which stars Vicky Luengo, Elisabet Casanovas, Carolina Yuste and Ángela Cervantes.

== Plot ==
The fiction (a comedy-drama) follows Marta, a photographer accustomed to operating in artsy social circles who is fired from her job and somewhat begrudgingly returns to the working-class neighborhood in Cornellà where she comes from. Upon her return, she meets with her childhood friends Desi, Soraya and Bea, rekindling their old friendship.

== Cast ==
- Vicky Luengo as Marta
- Elisabet Casanovas as Bea
- Carolina Yuste as Desi
- Ángela Cervantes as Soraya
- Cristina Plazas
- Mario Zorrilla
- José Mota
- Ana Fernández
- Frank Feys
- Louise Good
- Carlos Serrano
- Biel Durán

== Production ==
Girlfriends is Carol Rodríguez Colás' debut film. The screenplay was written by her sister Marina Rodríguez Colás. Juan Carlos Lausín worked as director of cinematography whereas the score was composed by Francesc Gener. It was produced by Balance Media Entertainment with the participation of RTVE, Televisió de Catalunya, ICEC and Movistar+. It was shot in between Cornellà de Llobregat and Poblenou (Barcelona) and it was interrupted due to the health crisis caused by the COVID-19 pandemic.

== Release ==
Chavalas was screened at the 24th Málaga Film Festival in June 2021. The film earned three awards in Málaga: Movistar+ Award to Best Film, the Public's Choice Biznaga de Plata, and ASECAN Award for Debut Film. Distributed by Filmax, it was theatrically released on 3 September 2021.

== Accolades ==
Year	Award	Category	Nominee(s)	Result	Ref.
2022	9th Feroz Awards	Best Comedy Film		Nominated	
2022	9th Feroz Awards	Best Supporting Actress (film)	Carolina Yuste	Nominated	
2022	77th CEC Medals	Best New Director	Carol Rodríguez Colás	Nominated	
2022	77th CEC Medals	Best Supporting Actress	Carolina Yuste	Nominated	
2022	77th CEC Medals	Best New Actress	Ángela Cervantes	Nominated	
2022	77th CEC Medals	Best Original Screenplay	Marina Rodríguez Colás	Nominated	
2022	36th Goya Awards	Best New Director	Carol Rodríguez Colás	Nominated	
2022	36th Goya Awards	Best New Actress	Ángela Cervantes	Nominated	
2022	14th Gaudí Awards	Best Actress	Vicky Luengo	Nominated	
2022	14th Gaudí Awards	Best Supporting Actress	Ángela Cervantes	Won	
2022	14th Gaudí Awards	Best Makeup and Hairstyles	Montse Boqueras	Nominated	
2022	30th Actors and Actresses Union Awards	Best Film Actress in a Minor Role	Carolina Yuste	Nominated	
2022	Alma Awards	Best Screenplay in a Comedy Feature Film	Marina Rodríguez Colás	Nominated	

== See also ==
- List of Spanish films of 2021
