= Outlaws (2021 film) =

Spanish film directed by Daniel Monzón

- Theatrical release poster
- Spanish: Las leyes de la frontera
- Directed by: Daniel Monzón
- Screenplay by: Jorge Guerricaechevarría; Daniel Monzón
- Based on: Las leyes de la frontera by Javier Cercas
- Produced by: Edmon Roch; Javier Ugarte; Mercedes Gamero
- Starring: Chechu Salgado; Begoña Vargas; Marcos Ruiz
- Cinematography: Carles Gusi
- Edited by: Mapa Pastor
- Music by: Derby Motoreta's; Burrito Kachimba
- Production companies: La Terraza Films; Ikiru Films; Atresmedia Cine; Buendía Estudios; Las Leyes de la Frontera AIE
- Distributed by: Warner Bros. Pictures
- Release dates: 25 September 2021 (Zinemaldia); 8 October 2021 (Spain)
- Running time: 129 minutes
- Country: Spain
- Language: Spanish
- Budget: €7 million

Outlaws or The Laws of the Border (Spanish: Las leyes de la frontera) is a 2021 Spanish film directed by Daniel Monzón adapting the novel of the same name by Javier Cercas. It stars Marcos Ruiz, Begoña Vargas and Chechu Salgado.

== Premise ==
Set in the Summer of 1978, the fiction follows Nacho, a 17-year-old student living in Girona who befriends Zarco and Tere, two young criminals.

It has been presented as a revisitation of the quinqui film genre.

== Cast ==
- Marcos Ruiz as Ignacio "Nacho" Cañas
- Begoña Vargas as Tere
- Chechu Salgado as Zarco
- Carlos Oviedo as Guille
- Xavier Martín as Gordo
- Daniel Ibáñez as Piernas
- Jorge Aparicio as Chino
- Víctor Manuel Pajares as Drácula
- Cintia García as Lina
- Santiago Molero as Ignacio
- Carlos Serrano as Cuenca
- Xavi Sáez as Hidalgo
- Paula Romeu Garcia as Delphine
- Ainhoa Santamaría as Rosa
- Elisabet Casanovas as Cristina
- Javier Beltrán
- Pep Tosar as Vives
- Catalina Sopelana as Paqui
- Pep Cruz as Señor Tomás
- Estefanía de los Santos as Merche

== Production ==
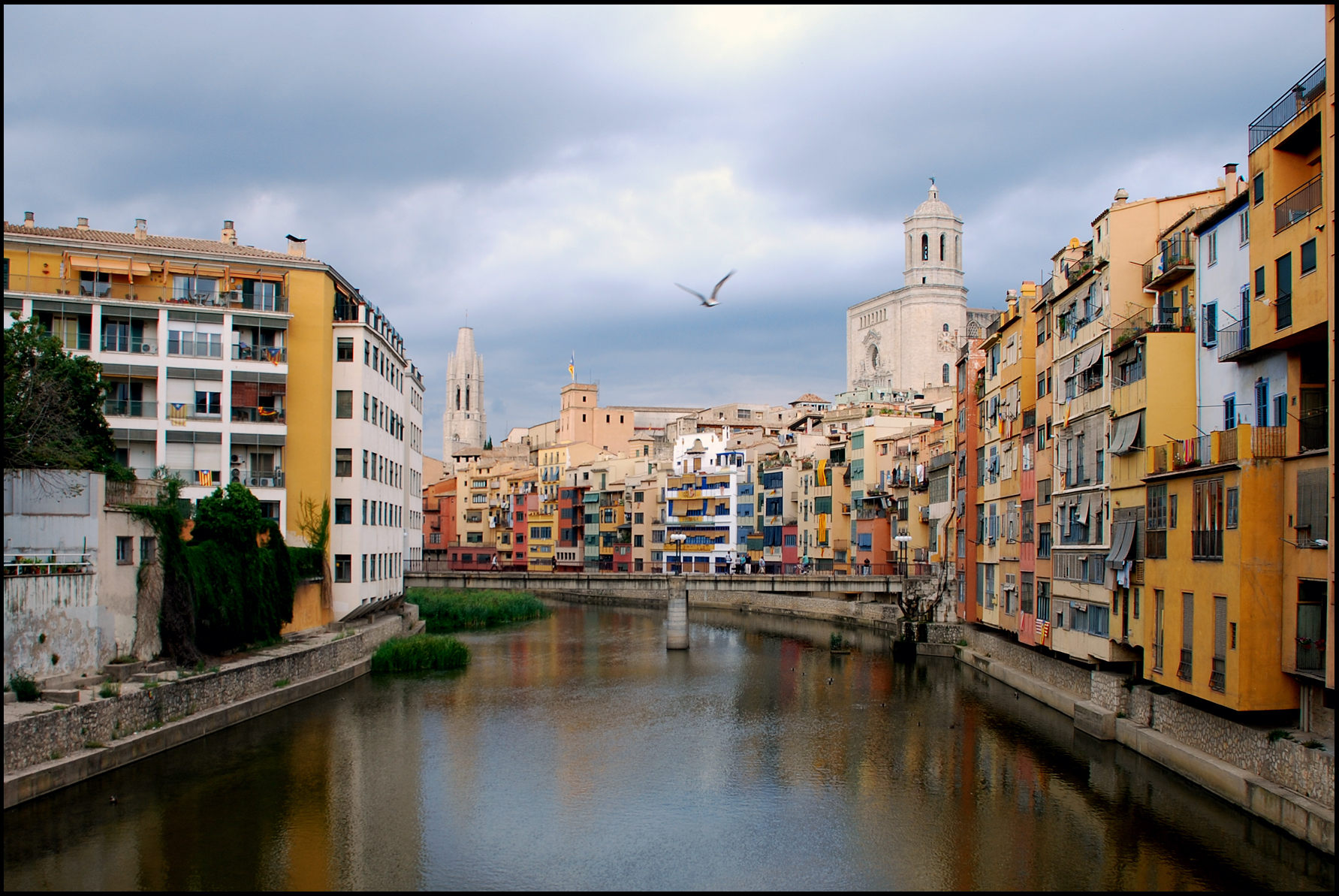
Footage was shot in Girona, a primary fictional setting for the film.

Penned by Jorge Guerricaechevarría, the screenplay is an adaptation of the novel of the same name by Javier Cercas.

Produced by Ikiru Films, La Terraza Films and Atresmedia Cine in collaboration with Buendía Estudios and Las leyes de la frontera AIE, the film received funding from the ICAA. Netflix secured the international rights. It has a reported budget of 7 million €. Directed by Daniel Monzón, shooting lasted for 10 weeks and wrapped in November 2020. Shooting locations included Girona, Manresa, Montblanc and Costa del Garraf. Balter Gallart worked as art director and Carles Gusi as director of cinematography.

== Release ==
The film premiered on 25 September 2021 at the 69th San Sebastián International Film Festival, bringing the festival to a closure.

Distributed by Warner Bros. Pictures España, it was theatrically released in Spain on 8 October 2021.

The film was set for a 22 November 2021 streaming release on Netflix, using the English-language title Outlaws.

== Reception ==
On the review aggregator website Rotten Tomatoes, 83% of 6 critics' reviews are positive, with an average rating of 6.5/10.

Fausto Fernández of Fotogramas gave the film 4 out 5 stars, positively highlighting the triangle formed by the characters Nacho, Tere and Zarco.

Philipp Engel of Cinemanía gave it 3½ out of 5 stars. He wrote that the Begoña Vargas' lead performance ends up eating those from the two male lead performers'. He considered that the atmosphere "halfway" works.

Josu Eguren of El Correo gave the film 2 out of 3 stars. He considered the film to be "stimulating reflection on the gap between memory and nostalgia" so pervasive in the Spanish contemporary historical discourse but ultimately dominated by "cheating digressive monologues transformed into images".

Federico Marín Bellón of ABC gave the film 4 out of 5 stars, considering it to be "a magnificent portrait, a new and stylized look" of the era already extensively portrayed by the quinqui genre.

== Accolades ==
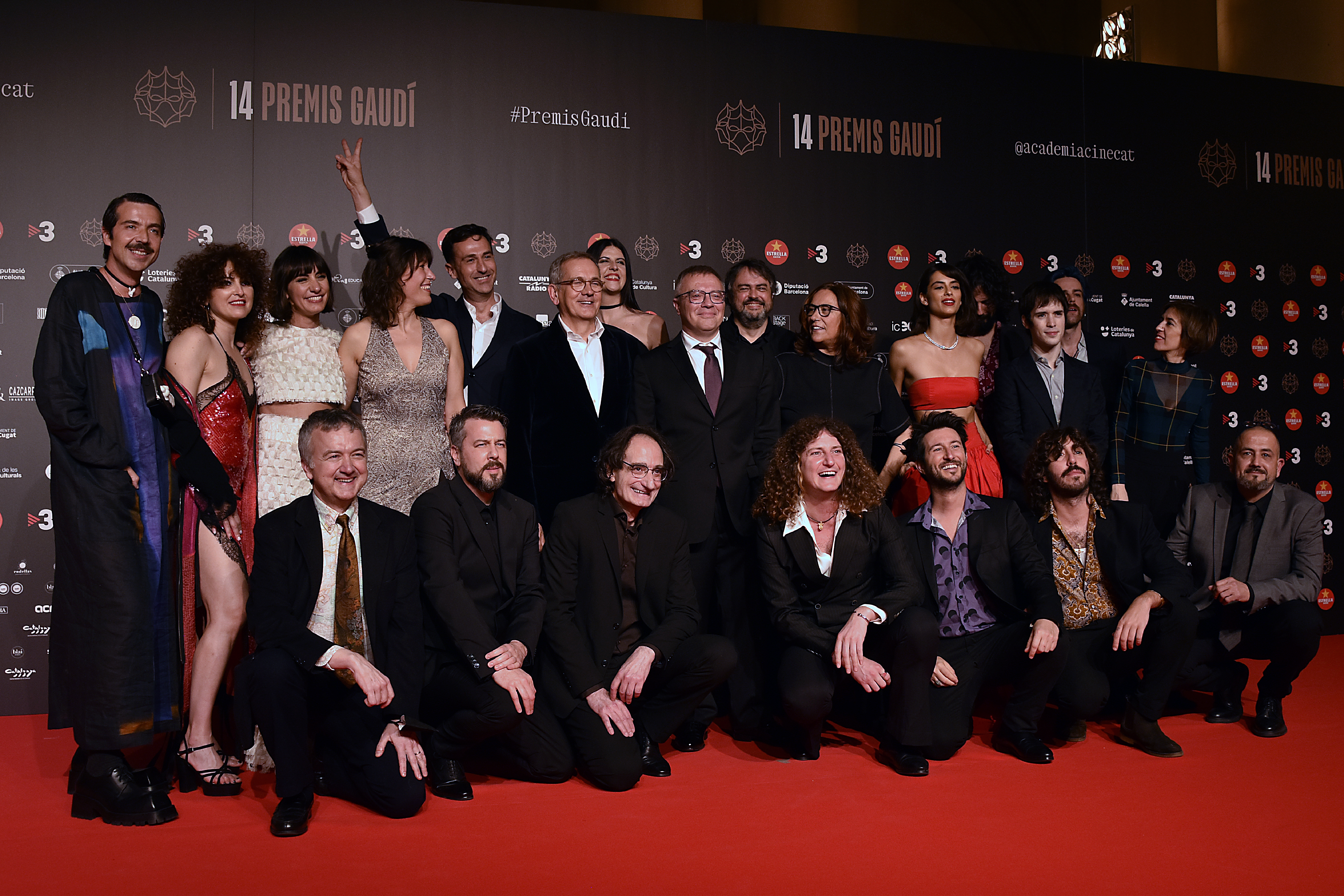
Cast and crew members attending the 14th Gaudí Awards.

Year	Award	Category	Nominee(s)	Result	Ref.
2022	9th Feroz Awards	Best Supporting Actor (film)	Chechu Salgado	Nominated	
2022	9th Feroz Awards	Best Trailer	Miguel Ángel Sanantonio	Nominated	
2022	77th CEC Medals	Best Film		Nominated	
2022	77th CEC Medals	Best Supporting Actor	Chechu Salgado	Nominated	
2022	77th CEC Medals	Best New Actor	Chechu Salgado	Won	
2022	77th CEC Medals	Best Adapted Screenplay	Jorge Guerricaechevarría, Daniel Monzón	Won	
2022	36th Goya Awards	Best Adapted Screenplay	Daniel Monzón, Jorge Guerricaechevarría	Won	
2022	36th Goya Awards	Best Original Song	"Las leyes de la Frontera" by Alejandro García Rodríguez, Antonio Molinero León, Daniel Escortell Blandino, José Manuel Cabrera Escot, Miguel García Cantero	Nominated	
2022	36th Goya Awards	Best New Actor	Chechu Salgado	Won	
2022	36th Goya Awards	Best Makeup and Hairstyles	Sarai Rodríguez, Benjamín Pérez, Nacho Díaz	Won	
2022	36th Goya Awards	Best Art Direction	Balter Gallart	Won	
2022	36th Goya Awards	Best Costume Design	Vinyet Escobar	Won	
2022	14th Gaudí Awards	Best Non-Catalan Language Film		Nominated	
2022	14th Gaudí Awards	Best Director	Daniel Monzón	Nominated	
2022	14th Gaudí Awards	Best Actress	Begoña Vargas	Nominated	
2022	14th Gaudí Awards	Best Actor	Chechu Salgado	Nominated	
2022	14th Gaudí Awards	Best Production Supervision	Goretti Pagès	Nominated	
2022	14th Gaudí Awards	Best Art Direction	Balter Gallar	Won	
2022	14th Gaudí Awards	Best Editing	Mapa Pastor	Nominated	
2022	14th Gaudí Awards	Best Original Music	Derby Motoreta's Burrito Kachimba	Nominated	
2022	14th Gaudí Awards	Best Cinematography	Carles Gusi	Nominated	
2022	14th Gaudí Awards	Best Costume Design	Vinyet Escobar	Won	
2022	14th Gaudí Awards	Best Sound	Isaac Bonfill, Oriol Tarragó, Marc Orts	Nominated	
2022	14th Gaudí Awards	Best Visual Effects	Raúl Romanillos, Míriam Piquer	Nominated	
2022	14th Gaudí Awards	Best Makeup and Hairstyles	Sarai Rodríguez, Nacho Díaz, Benjamín Pérez	Won	
2022	14th Gaudí Awards	Public's Choice Award for Best Film		Nominated	
2022	30th Actors and Actresses Union Awards	Best New Actress	Begoña Vargas	Nominated	
2022	Spanish Screenwriters' Union Awards	Best Screenplay in a Drama Feature Film	Jorge Guerricaechevarría, Daniel Monzón	Nominated	

== See also ==
- List of Spanish films of 2021
