= Reyes de la noche =

Spanish comedy-drama television series

- Genre: Comedy drama
- Created by: Adolfo Valor; Cristóbal Garrido
- Directed by: Carlos Therón; Adolfo Valor
- Starring: Javier Gutiérrez; Miki Esparbé; Itsaso Arana
- Country of origin: Spain
- Original language: Spanish
- No. of seasons: 1
- No. of episodes: 6

Production
- Running time: 30 min (approx.)
- Production companies: Movistar+; Zeta Studios

Original release
- Network: Movistar+
- Release: 14 May – 28 May 2021

Reyes de la noche (transl. 'Kings of the Night') is a Spanish comedy-drama television series centered on the world of sports radio broadcasting. Created by Adolfo Valor and Cristóbal Garrido and starring Javier Gutiérrez, Miki Esparbé and Itsaso Arana, its single season aired on Movistar+ in May 2021.

== Premise ==
The series is set in between the 1980s and the 1990s during the golden age of Spanish sports radio broadcasting.

A comedy-drama, the fiction draws a loose inspiration from the real-life rivalry between José María García and José Ramón de la Morena in the early 1990s.

Paco el Cóndor, the biggest radio personality in Spain, leaves his radio station as he signs up for a competitor. His aggressive style attracts the attention from the radio listeners. His second in command and pupil, the younger Jota, stays and becomes his rival as they vie for hegemony in the radio system. While Jota initially disapproves of El Cóndor's methods, he learns the hard way that if he is to succeed, he will need to follow his former master's steps. Meanwhile, the radio programme hosted by Marga Laforet is moved to the early morning slot.

== Cast ==
- Javier Gutiérrez as Francisco Javier Maldonado, aka "Paco El Cóndor"
- Miki Esparbé as "Jota" Montes
- Itsaso Arana as Marga Laforet
- Alberto San Juan as Cerdán
- Chiqui Fernández as Marisa
- Sonia Almarcha as Almudena
- Cristóbal Suárez as Urrutia
- Óscar de la Fuente as Pineda
- Carlos Blanco as Bermúdez
- Víctor de la Fuente as Alfonso
- Gerald B. Fillmore as Teodoro
- Celia de Molina as Concha
- Fele Martínez as Arturo
- Omar Banana as Jorge

== Production and release ==
Created by Adolfo Valor and Cristóbal Garrido, Reyes de la noche is produced by Movistar+ in collaboration with Zeta Studios. The series consists of 6 episodes featuring a running time of around 30 minutes. The filming started in July 2020, and it was wrapped by September 2020. The episodes were directed by Carlos Therón and Valor himself. On 14 April 2021, Movistar+ disclosed the release date of 14 May 2021 for the first 2 episodes.

The series was cancelled after one season.

Series	Episodes	Originally released			Ref.
Series	Episodes	First released	Last released	Network	Ref.
1	6	14 May 2021	28 May 2021	Movistar+	

No.	Title	Original release date
1	"Piloto"	14 May 2021
2	"La convocatoria"	14 May 2021
3	"Gil"	21 May 2021
4	"Pito regalao"	21 May 2021
5	"La gran final"	28 May 2021
6	"Minuto y resultado"	28 May 2021

== Awards and nominations ==
Year	Award	Category	Nominee(s)	Result	Ref.
2021	27th Forqué Awards	Best Actor (TV series)	Javier Gutiérrez	Nominated	
2021	9th MiM Series Awards	Best Miniseries		Nominated	
2021	9th MiM Series Awards	Best Screenplay	Cristóbal Garrido & Adolfo Valor	Nominated	
2021	9th MiM Series Awards	Best Comedy Actor	Miki Esparbé	Nominated	
2022	9th Feroz Awards	Best Comedy Series		Nominated	
2022	9th Feroz Awards	Best Leading Actor (TV series)	Javier Gutiérrez	Nominated	
2022	9th Feroz Awards	Best Supporting Actress (TV series)	Itsaso Arana	Nominated	
2022	9th Feroz Awards	Best Supporting Actor (TV series)	Alberto San Juan	Nominated	
