= The Odd-Job Men =

2021 Spanish-French film by Neus Ballús

- Theatrical release poster
- Catalan: Sis dies corrents
- Directed by: Neus Ballús
- Written by: Neus Ballús; Margarita Melgar
- Produced by: Miriam Porté
- Starring: Mohamed Mellali; Valero Escolar; Pep Sarrà
- Cinematography: Anna Molins
- Edited by: Neus Ballús; Ariadna Ribas
- Music by: René-Marc Bini
- Production companies: Distinto Films; El Kinògraf; Slot Machine
- Distributed by: Filmax
- Release dates: 7 August 2021 (Locarno); 3 December 2021 (Spain)
- Countries: Spain; France
- Languages: Catalan; Spanish; Amazigh

The Odd-Job Men (Catalan: Sis dies corrents; lit. 'Six Normal Days') is a 2021 comedy-drama film directed by Neus Ballús which stars Mohamed Mellali, Valero Escolar and Pep Sarrà. It is a Spanish-French co-production.

== Plot ==
A dramedy blurring the limits between a fiction film and a documentary, the film exposes racist prejudices in the Catalan society. It tracks the day-to-day life of three plumbers/electricians (performed by semi-professional actors) in the outskirts of Barcelona. It features dialogue in Spanish, Catalan and Amazigh.

== Cast ==
- Mohamed Mellali as Moha.
- Valero Escolar as Valero.
- Pep Sarrà as Pep.
- Hamid Minoucha
- Youssef Ouhadi

== Production ==
The screenplay was penned by the director Neus Ballús alongside 'Margarita Melgar' (a collective pseudonym for Montse Ganges and Ana Sanz-Magallón).

The film was produced by Distinto Films and El Kinògraf alongside Slot Machine, with the participación of RTVE, TVC, Movistar+ and support from ICAA and ICEC.

== Release ==
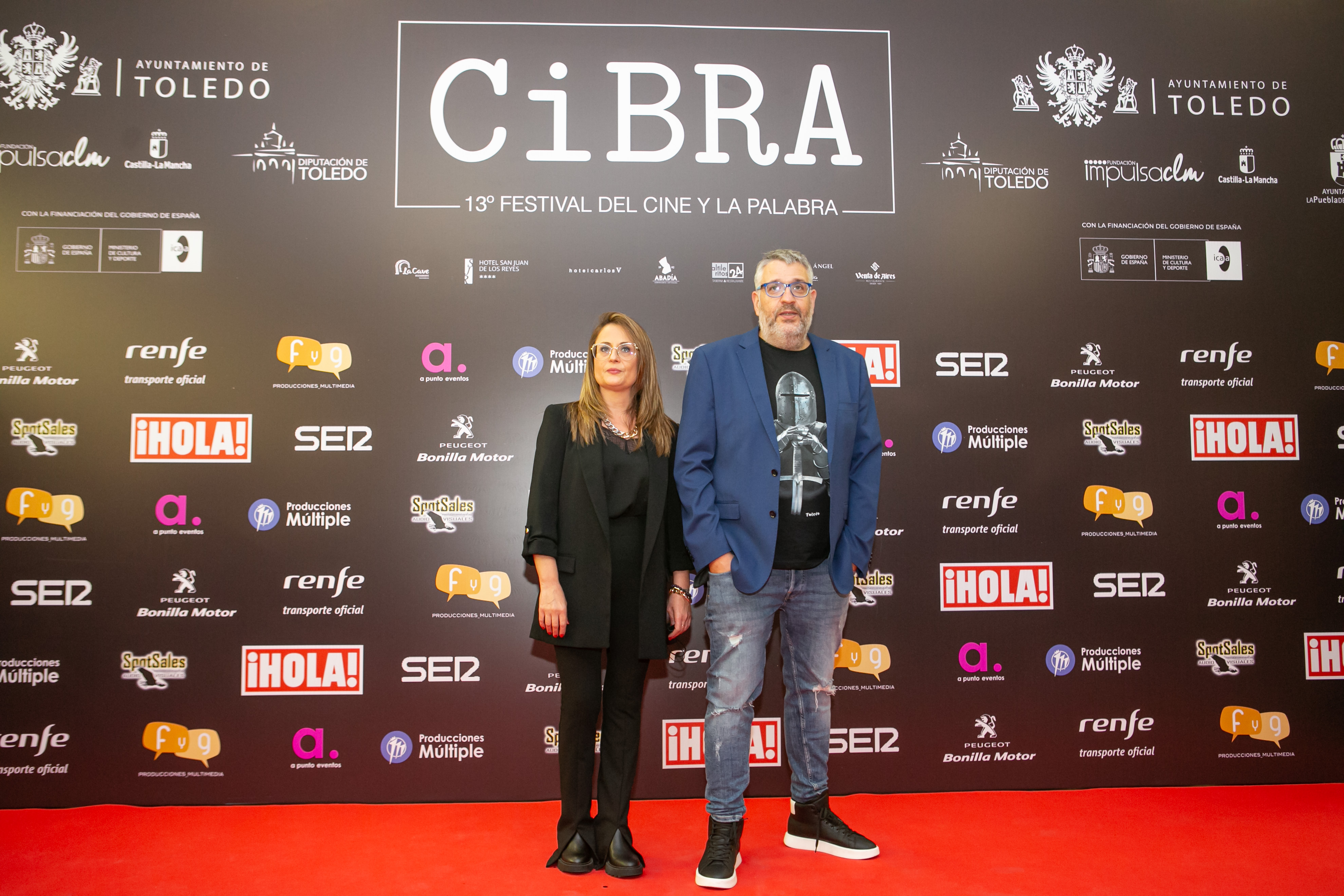
Lead actor Valero Escolar at the ending gala of the 13th CiBRA Festival in Toledo on 21 November 2021.

The film had its world premiere at the 74th Locarno Film Festival (LFF) in August 2021. It also screened at the 46th Toronto International Film Festival (September 2021), the 26th Busan International Film Festival (online, October 2021), the 66th Valladolid International Film Festival (October 2021) and the 13th CiBRA Festival in Toledo (November 2021). Distributed by Filmax, it was theatrically released in Spain on 3 December 2021.

== Reception ==
The review aggregator website Rotten Tomatoes reported a 93% approval rating, based on 14 reviews with an average rating of 7.40/10.

Beatriz Martínez of El Periódico de Catalunya gave the film 5 out of 5 stars, deeming it to be a "film made out of commitment and vindication that is so full of nobility and that is capable, through its humour and humanity, of connecting in such a sincere way with the audience".

Àlex Montoya of Fotogramas gave it 4 out of 5 stars highlighting the light tone and the charisma displayed by the three leads.

Sergi Sánchez of La Razón gave it 3 out of 5 stars, praising the performances by the semi-professional actors, while negatively considering that the underlying thesis behind the film is laid out "with excessive naivety".

Jessica Kiang of Variety considered it as a "charming, slight yet sharp Spanish odd-couple comedy".

== Awards and nominations ==
Year	Award	Category	Nominee(s)	Result	Ref.
2021	74th Locarno Film Festival	Leopard for Best Actor	Mohamed Mellali & Valero Escolar	Won	
2021	74th Locarno Film Festival	Europa Cinemas Label		Won	
2021	66th Valladolid International Film Festival	Silver Spike		Won	
2021	66th Valladolid International Film Festival	People's Choice Award		Won	
2021	13th Festival CiBRA	People's Choice Award		Won	
2022	9th Feroz Awards	Best Comedy Film		Nominated	
2022	14th Gaudí Awards	Best Film		Won	
2022	14th Gaudí Awards	Best Direction	Neus Ballús	Won	
2022	14th Gaudí Awards	Best Screenplay	Neus Ballús, Margarita Melgar	Nominated	
2022	14th Gaudí Awards	Best Actor	Mohamed Mellali	Won	
2022	14th Gaudí Awards	Best Production Supervision	Bernat Rifé, Goretti Pagès	Nominated	
2022	14th Gaudí Awards	Best Editing	Neus Ballús, Ariadna Ribas	Won	
2022	14th Gaudí Awards	Best Supporting Actor	Valero Escolar	Won	
2022	14th Gaudí Awards	Best Costume Design	Alba Costa	Nominated	
2022	14th Gaudí Awards	Best Sound	Amanda Villavieja, Elena Coderch, Albert Manera	Nominated	
2022	14th Gaudí Awards	Public's Choice Special Award for Best Film		Nominated	

== See also ==
- List of Spanish films of 2021
