= Neus Ballús =

Spanish film director

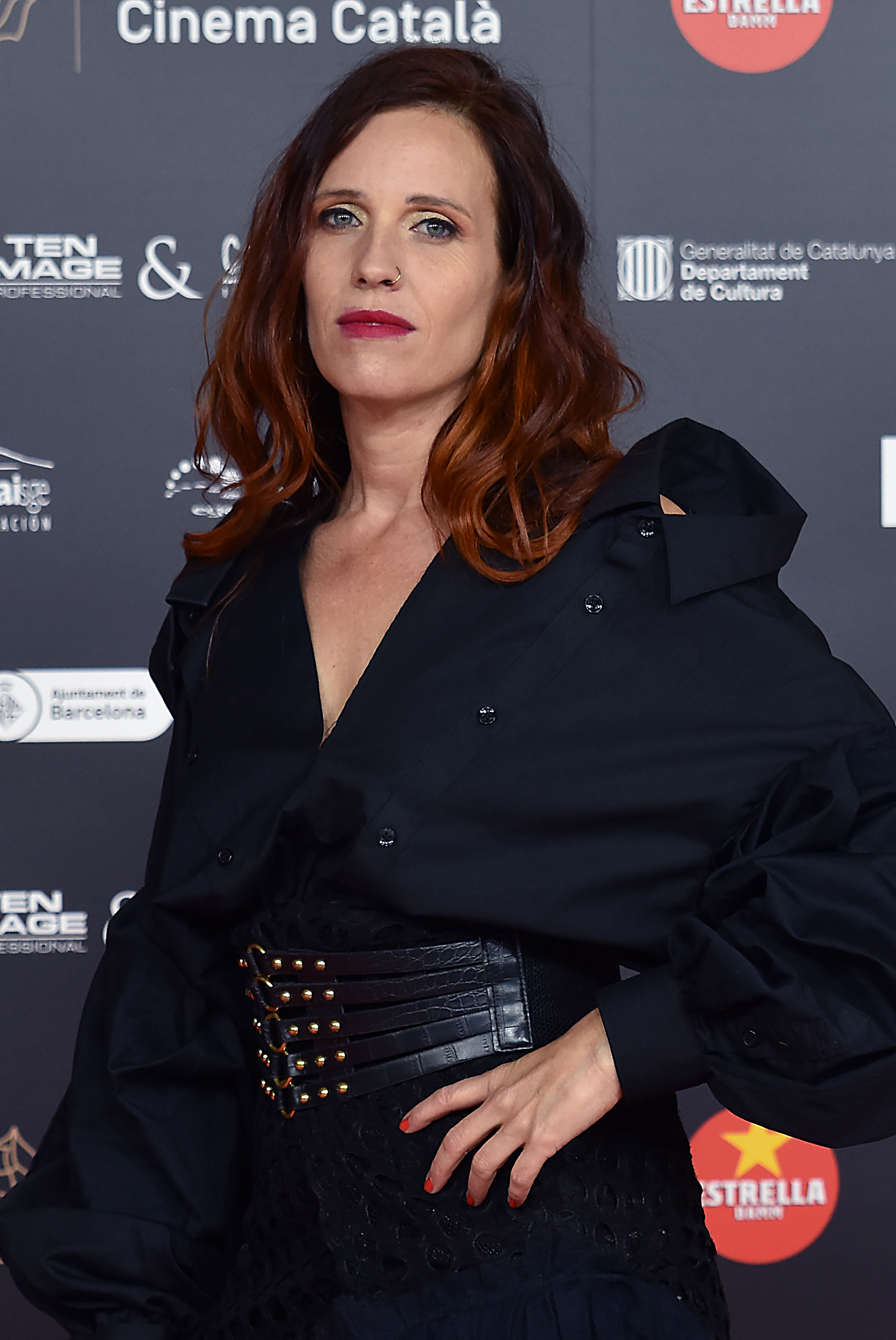
- Neus Ballús at the 2021 Gaudí Awards
- Born: 1980 (age 45–46); Mollet del Vallès
- Occupations: Film director and scriptwriter

Neus Ballús (born 1980) is a Catalan film director and scriptwriter.

She has a degree in Audiovisual Communication and a Master in Documentary Making from the Pompeu Fabra University. She released her first film La plaga (The Plague) in 2013, which was screened at the 63rd Berlin International Film Festival. It won 4 Gaudí Awards and was nominated for the LUX Prize, the European Film Awards and the Goya Awards. The film portrays everyday life in a rural zone of the periphery of Barcelona, named Gallecs. Before, she had done some shorts like La Gabi (2004), L'avi de la càmera (Grandad with Camera, 2005) and the documentary Immersió (2009), awarded with the Best Short Film Prize at the ALCINE Festival.

Her second film, El viatge de Marta (Staff Only) (2019), also premiered at the 69th Berlin International Film Festival and was screened in cinemas in France and Spain. It is about a 17-year-old girl who spends her Christmas holidays in Senegal with her brother and father. Tired of family planned trips, and of her father's behaviour, she opens the door to the staff area and discovers a world that allows her to develop close and complex relationships.

In August 2021, her film Sis dies corrents (The Odd-job men) (Distinto Films, 2021), premiered at the 74th Locarno Film Festival, telling the story of a young Moroccan plumber who has to deal with equally eccentric colleagues and customers in order to get through his one-week probationary contract.

== Works ==
- Immersió - 2009
- The Plague (La plaga) - 2013
- Staff Only (El viatge de la Marta) - 2019
- The Odd-Job Men (Sis dies corrents) - 2021
