= Ocean Sea (novel) =

1993 novel by Alessandro Baricco

- First edition (Italian)
- Author: Alessandro Baricco
- Original title: Oceano mare
- Translator: Alastair McEwen
- Language: Italian
- Publisher: Rizzoli editore
- Publication date: 1993
- Publication place: Italy
- English publication date: 1999
- Pages: 226
- ISBN: 88-17-66043-4

Ocean Sea (Italian: Oceano mare) is a 1993 novel by the Italian writer Alessandro Baricco. Its narrative revolves around the lives of a group of people gathered at a remote seaside hotel. The book is divided into three chapters: Locanda Almayer (Almayer Inn), Il ventre del mare (The Belly of the Sea), and I canti del ritorno (The Songs of the Return). The novel won the Viareggio Prize.

== Reception ==
Richard Bernstein reviewed the book for The New York Times, and wrote: "Ocean Sea unfolds in its poetically elliptical way. Mr. Baricco is a literary cubist, a stylist who looks simultaneously at the several sides of things. He switches from one rhetorical mode to another, from a kind of symbolist poetry to grand adventure narrative to picaresque comedy." Bernstein continued: "This style of writing can be precious, artificial, a kind of verbal craftsmanship for craftsmanship's sake, but generally I read Ocean Sea transfixed by Mr. Baricco's linguistic originality, the boisterousness of his characters, and the skill with which he weaves the threads of a seemingly disjointed plot into a single narrative strand." Tom Boncza-Tomaszewski of The Independent called the book an "extraordinary novel", and wrote: "A book about being, metaphysics juggled like the best trick of a wise old clown, this is a novel that at least suggests there's more to life than what any rationalist would tell you."

== See also ==
- 1993 in literature
- Italian literature
