= Chechu Salgado =

Spanish actor

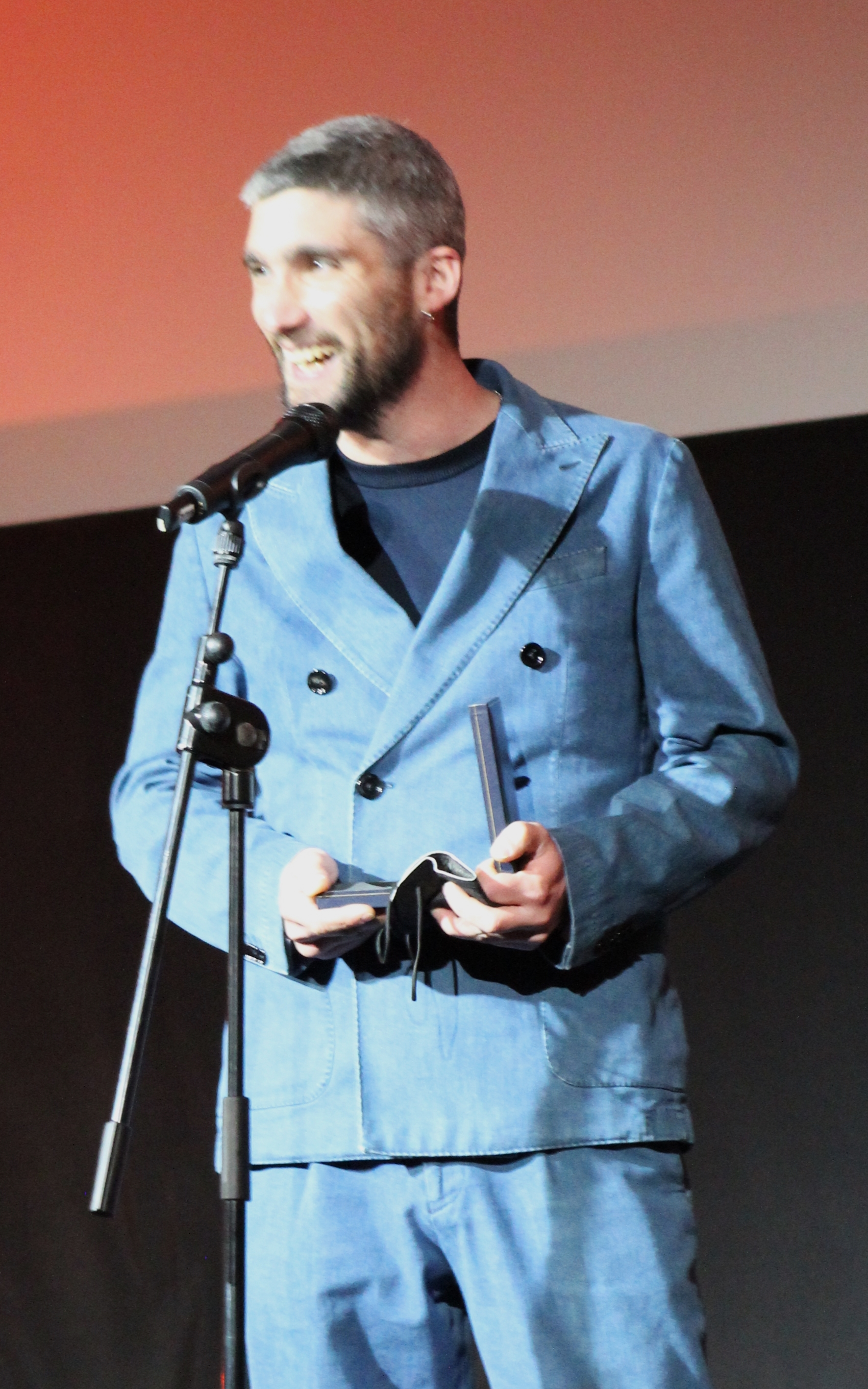
- Salgado in 2022
- Born: Jesús Salgado López; 1 February 1991 (age 34); Sober, Galicia, Spain
- Occupation: Actor

Jesús Salgado López (born 1 February 1991), known as Chechu Salgado, is a Spanish actor from Galicia.

== Life and career ==
Jesús Salgado López was born in Sober, province of Lugo, on 1 February 1991. He was raised in Ourense. He received training as an actor at the ESAD of Vigo.

Following his beginnings onstage, he made his television debut in Galician series Serramoura, portraying Román Fiúza. It was followed by television credits in Cocaine Coast, La caza. Monteperdido, Servir y proteger, Desaparecidos, Madres. Amor y vida, and Patria and his feature film debut in María Solinha (2020). His portrayal of young criminal Zarco in Outlaws (2021) earned him the Goya Award for Best New Actor. His performance in the film also landed him the CEC Medal for Best New Actor and a nomination to the Feroz Award for Best Supporting Actor. He featured afterwards in television roles in Motel Valkirias, Tú también lo harías, and Gangs of Galicia.
