= 1st Carmen Awards =

2022 Andalusian film awards

- Date: 30 January 2022
- Site: Teatro Cervantes, Málaga, Andalusia, Spain
- Hosted by: Adelfa Calvo; Pedro Casablanc
- Organized by: Andalusian Film Academy

Highlights
- Best Picture: The Daughter
- Honorary career award: Antonio Banderas
- Best Actor: Antonio Dechent; A Dead Man Cannot Live
- Best Actress: Petra Martínez; That Was Life
- Most awards: Undercover Wedding Crashers (6)

Television coverage
- Network: Canal Sur

The 1st Carmen Awards, presented by the Andalusian Film Academy, were held on 30 January 2022 at the Teatro Cervantes in Málaga. The gala, broadcast on Canal Sur, was hosted by Adelfa Calvo and Pedro Casablanc.

== History ==
The Andalusian Film Academy disclosed the nominations on 14 December 2021. The statuette was made of polymer resin.

Held at the Málaga's Teatro Cervantes on 30 January 2022, the ceremony had support from the Andalusian regional ministry of Culture, Canal Sur Televisión, Ayuntamiento de Málaga, Diputación de Málaga, EGEDA and SGAE, among others. It was hosted by Adelfa Calvo and Pedro Casablanc and it featured musical performances by Derby's Motoreta Burrito Cachimba, Maui de Utrera, Toreros con chanclas, and Danza Invisible.

The award for best picture, presented by Belén Cuesta and Álvaro Morte, was given to Manuel Martín Cuenca's The Daughter, that also clinched another three awards (including Director and Screenplay). Undercover Wedding Crashers won the most awards (6).

== Winners and nominees ==
The winners and nominees are listed as follows:

Best Fiction Feature Film: The Daughter; Alegría; That Was Life; When Brooklyn Met Seville	Best Director: Manuel Martín Cuenca — The Daughter; Paco Ortiz — Algo salvaje. La historia de Bambino; Alexis Morante — Héroes. Silencio y Rock and Roll; Benito Zambrano — Lemon and Poppy Seed Cake
Best Screenplay: Alejandro Hernández, Manuel Martín Cuenca — The Daughter; Isa Sánchez, Violeta Salama — Alegría; David Martín de los Santos — That Was Life; Benito Zambrano — Lemon and Poppy Seed Cake	Best Production Supervision: Manuela Ocón — Undercover Wedding Crashers; Manolo Limón — Alegría; Ernesto Chao — The Daughter; Damián Paris — That Was Life
Best Actor: Antonio Dechent — A Dead Man Cannot Live; Luis Alberto Domínguez — Algo salvaje. La historia de Bambino; Paco Roma — El hilo dorado; Pablo Puyol — La mancha negra	Best Actress: Petra Martínez — That Was Life; Cristina Mediero — El hilo dorado; Paz Vega — The House of Snails; Estefanía de los Santos — When Brooklyn Met Seville
Best Supporting Actor: Manolo Solo — The Good Boss; Manolo Solo — When Brooklyn Met Seville; Vicente Romero — Once Upon a Time in Euskadi; Paco Tous — A Dead Man Cannot Live; Juan Carlos Villanueva — The Daughter	Best Supporting Actress: Natalia de Molina — Undercover Wedding Crashers; Mara Guil — Alegría; María Alfonsa Rosso — Once Upon a Time in Euskadi; Pilar Gómez — That Was Life
Best New Actor: Ignacio Nacho — La mancha negra; Miguel Clavijo — Algo salvaje. La historia de Bambino; Juanlu González — Undercover Wedding Crashers; Xisco González — Undercover Wedding Crashers	Best New Actress: Mara Guil — The Good Boss; Elena Martínez — A Dead Man Cannot Live; Noemí Ruiz — La mancha negra; Andrea Haro — When Brooklyn Met Seville
Best New Director: David Martín de los Santos — That Was Life; Violeta Salama — Alegría; Ezekiel Montes — A Dead Man Cannot Live; Macarena Astorga — The House of Snails	Best Original Score: Riki Rivera — Undercover Wedding Crashers; David Miralles — El hilo dorado; Jesús Calderón — La mancha negra; Riki Rivera — When Brooklyn Met Seville
Best Original Song: Riki Rivera, Violeta Arriaza — Undercover Wedding Crashers; Chelo Soto — A Dead Man Cannot Live; Jesús Calderón, Zenobia Fernández — La mancha negra; Estrella Morente, Fernando Vacas — That Was Life	Best Cinematography: Pau Esteve Birba — The Good Boss; Pau Esteve Birba — Alegría; Elisa Moreno — Algo salvaje. La historia de Bambino; Ezekiel Montes — A Dead Man Cannot Live
Best Editing: Ana Álvarez-Ossorio — When Brooklyn Met Seville; Ana Álvarez-Ossorio — La mancha negra; José M. G. Moyano — Alegría; José M. G. Moyano — A Dead Man Cannot Live; Miguel Doblado — That Was Life	Best Costume Design: Esther Vaquero — Undercover Wedding Crashers; Fernando García — The Good Boss; Florencia Tam — La mancha negra; Lourdes Fuentes — When Brooklyn Met Seville
Best Sound: Dani de Zayas — Undercover Wedding Crashers; Jorge Marín, Sara Marín — Alegría; Diana Sagrista — Once Upon a Time in Euskadi; Diana Sagrista — The House of Snails; Antonio Rodríguez, Jorge Marín — When Brooklyn Met Seville	Best Art Direction: Pepe Domínguez — Alegría; Pilar Angulo — Algo salvaje. La historia de Bambino; Sergi Hernández — La mancha negra; Lala Obrero — When Brooklyn Met Seville
Best Makeup and Hairstyles: Yolanda Piña — The Daughter; Félix Terrero, Yolanda Piña — Alegría; Anabel Beato, Carmela Martín — When Brooklyn Met Seville; Yolanda Piña, Félix Terrero — Undercover Wedding Crashers	Best Documentary Feature Film: Algo salvaje. La historia de Bambino; A este lado de la carretera; Callejeras; Una luz en la oscuridad
Best Fiction Short Film: Xun; Amateurs; Contigo; Duende; La primavera siempre vuelve	Best Documentary Short Film: Paraíso en llamas; (A) Plomo; Un viento roza tu puerta
Best Special Effects: Eduardo Pérez, Juan Ventura, Víctor Alcalá — A Dead Man Cannot Live; Amparo Martínez — Alegría; Eliot Eden, Julia Mateo — La mancha negra; Amparo Martínez — When Brooklyn Met Seville

== Honorary Carmen Award ==
In addition to the competitive awards, Antonio Banderas received the honorary career award.
