= Carmen Awards =

Andalusian film awards

- Type: Film Awards
- Location: Andalusia
- Country: Spain
- Presented by: Andalusian Film Academy
- First award: 2022
- Website: http://premioscarmen.com/, https://academiacineandalucia.com/premios/

The Carmen Awards (Spanish: Premios Carmen) are Andalusia's main annual film awards, presented by Andalusian Film Academy.

== History ==
The Andalusian Film Academy (Academia del Cine de Andalucía) was created in 2020. Prior to its creation, the main regional film awards were the ASECAN Awards, presented by the association of Andalusian Cinematographic Writers (ASECAN). Upon the announcement of the 1st Carmen Awards, the ASECAN awards reduced the number of categories, removing the technical categories. For the 1st edition of the Carmen Awards celebrated on 30 January 2022 in Málaga, the Andalusian Film Academy opted for a polyhedric statuette made of polymer resin as a trophy. For the 2nd edition, held in Almería, the trophies were made of bronze, replacing the resin trophies.

== Ceremonies ==
The following is a listing of all Carmen Awards ceremonies:

Ceremony	Date	Best Film	Host(s)	Venue	Ref.
1st Carmen Awards	30 January 2022	The Daughter	Adelfa Calvo & Pedro Casablanc	Teatro Cervantes (Málaga)	
2nd Carmen Awards	4 February 2023	Prison 77	Belén Cuesta & Salva Reina	Auditorio Maestro Padilla (Almería)	
3rd Carmen Awards	3 February 2024	Close Your Eyes	Martita de Graná & Salva Reina	Casa Colón (Huelva)	
4th Carmen Awards	1 February 2025	Saturn Return	Macarena Gómez & Antonio Pagudo	Gran Teatro (Córdoba)	
5th Carmen Awards	31 January 2026	Los Tigres	Manu Sánchez	Palacio de Exposiciones y Congresos (Granada)	
