= 77th CEC Awards =

Spanish film awards

- Date: 9 February 2022
- Site: Palacio de la Prensa, Madrid, Spain
- Hosted by: Assumpta Serna; Scott Cleverdon
- Organized by: Círculo de Escritores Cinematográficos

Highlights
- Most awards: Love Gets a Room (6)
- Most nominations: The Good Boss (13)

The 77th CEC Medals ceremony, presented by the Círculo de Escritores Cinematográficos, took place on 9 February 2022 at the Palacio de la Prensa in Madrid. The gala was hosted by Assumpta Serna and Scott Cleverdon.

== Winners and nominees ==
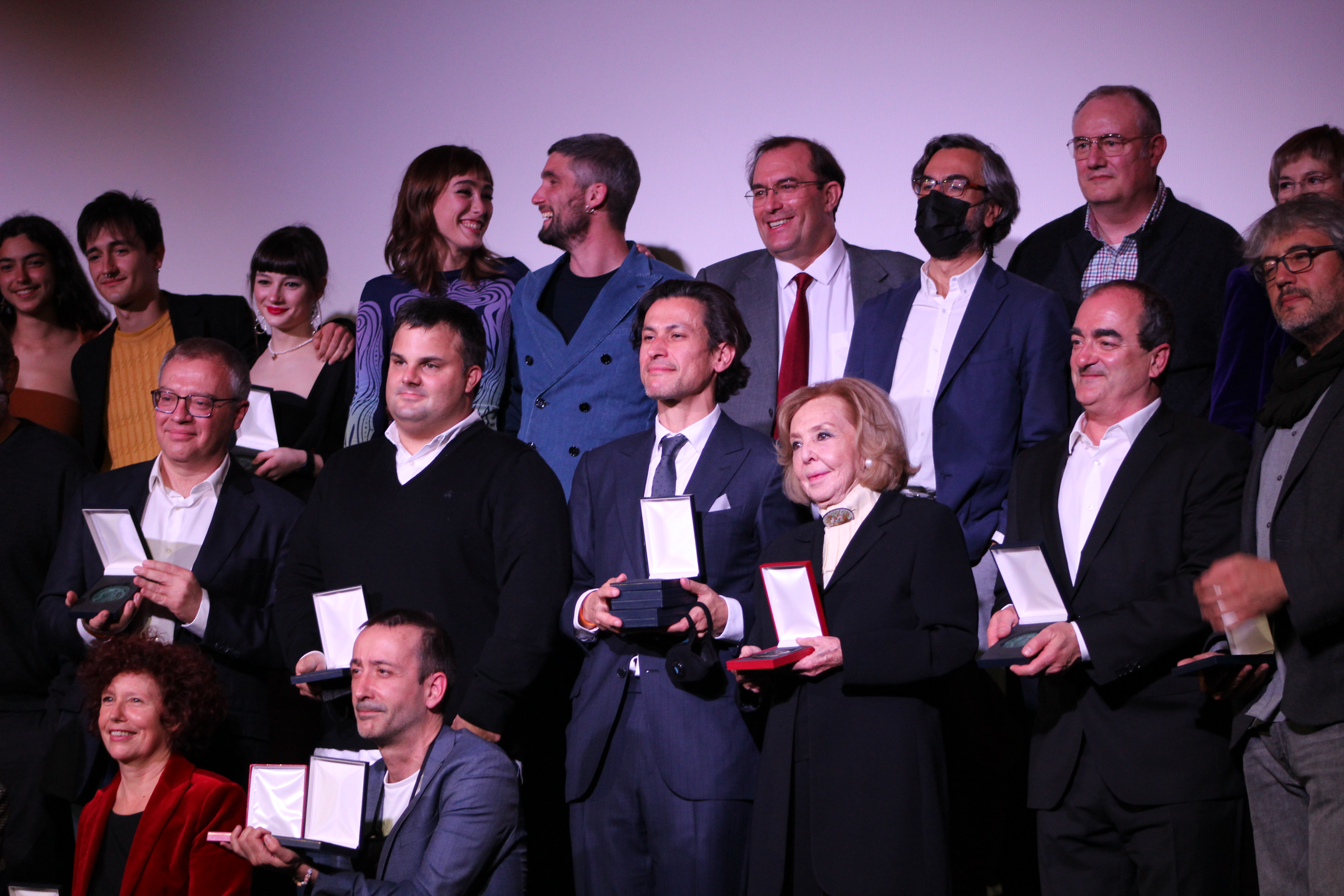
Group photo with some of the winners

The winners and nominees are listed as follows:

Best Film: Love Gets a Room; The Good Boss; Parallel Mothers; Libertad	Best Animation Film: Valentina; Salvar el árbol; Gora Automatikoa; Mironins
Best Director: Rodrigo Cortés – Love Gets a Room; Icíar Bollaín – Maixabel; Fernando León de Aranoa – The Good Boss; Manuel Martín Cuenca – The Daughter; Pedro Almodóvar – Parallel Mothers	Best New Director: David Martín de los Santos – That Was Life; Miguel Ángel Muñoz – 100 días con la Tata; Clara Roquet – Libertad; Carol Rodríguez Colás – Girlfriends
Best Original Screenplay: Rodrigo Cortés, David Safier – Love Gets a Room; Fernando León de Aranoa – The Good Boss; Icíar Bollaín, Isa Campo – Maixabel; Marina Rodríguez Colás – Girlfriends	Best Adapted Screenplay: Jorge Guerricaechevarría, Daniel Monzón – Outlaws; Benito Zambrano – Lemon and Poppy Seed Cake; Agustí Villaronga – The Belly of the Sea; Nuria Dunjó, Júlia de Paz – Ama
Best Actor: Javier Bardem – The Good Boss; Luis Tosar – Maixabel; Javier Gutiérrez – The Daughter; Eduard Fernández – Mediterraneo: The Law of the Sea	Best Actress: Blanca Portillo – Maixabel; Petra Martínez – That Was Life; Clara Rugaard – Love Gets a Room; Penélope Cruz – Parallel Mothers
Best Supporting Actor: Urko Olazabal – Maixabel; Manolo Solo – The Good Boss; Celso Bugallo – The Good Boss; Chechu Salgado – Outlaws	Best Supporting Actress: Nora Navas – Libertad; Milena Smit – Parallel Mothers; Sonia Almarcha – The Good Boss; Carolina Yuste – Girlfriends
Best New Actor: Chechu Salgado – Outlaws; Óscar de la Fuente – The Good Boss; Jorge Motos – Lucas; Tarik Rmili – The Good Boss	Best New Actress: Almudena Amor – The Good Boss; Nicolle García – Libertad; Tamara Casellas – Ama; Ángela Cervantes – Girlfriends
Best Cinematography: Rafael García – Love Gets a Room; José Luis Alcaine – Parallel Mothers; Pau Esteve Birba – The Good Boss; Gris Jordana – Libertad	Best Editing: Rodrigo Cortés – Love Gets a Room; Nacho Ruiz Capillas – Maixabel; Vanessa Marimbert – The Good Boss; Teresa Font – Parallel Mothers
Best Music: Víctor Reyes – Love Gets a Room; Alberto Iglesias – Maixabel; Zeltia Montes – The Good Boss; Alberto Iglesias – Parallel Mothers	Best Documentary Film: Who's Stopping Us; 100 días con la Tata; España, la primera globalización; Medjugorje, la película
Best Foreign Film: Another Round; West Side Story; Minari; Nomadland

== Special awards ==
- Honorary Medal: María José Alfonso
- Medal for the Promotion of Cinema: Carlos Rodrigo Pascual
- Medal for the Journalistic and Literary Merit: Javier Ocaña
- 'Platino Educa de la Solidaridad' Medal (Fiction): Mediterraneo: The Law of the Sea
- 'Platino Educa de la Solidaridad' Medal (non-Fiction): 100 días con la Tata
