= Cristina Mediero =

Spanish actress (born 1984)

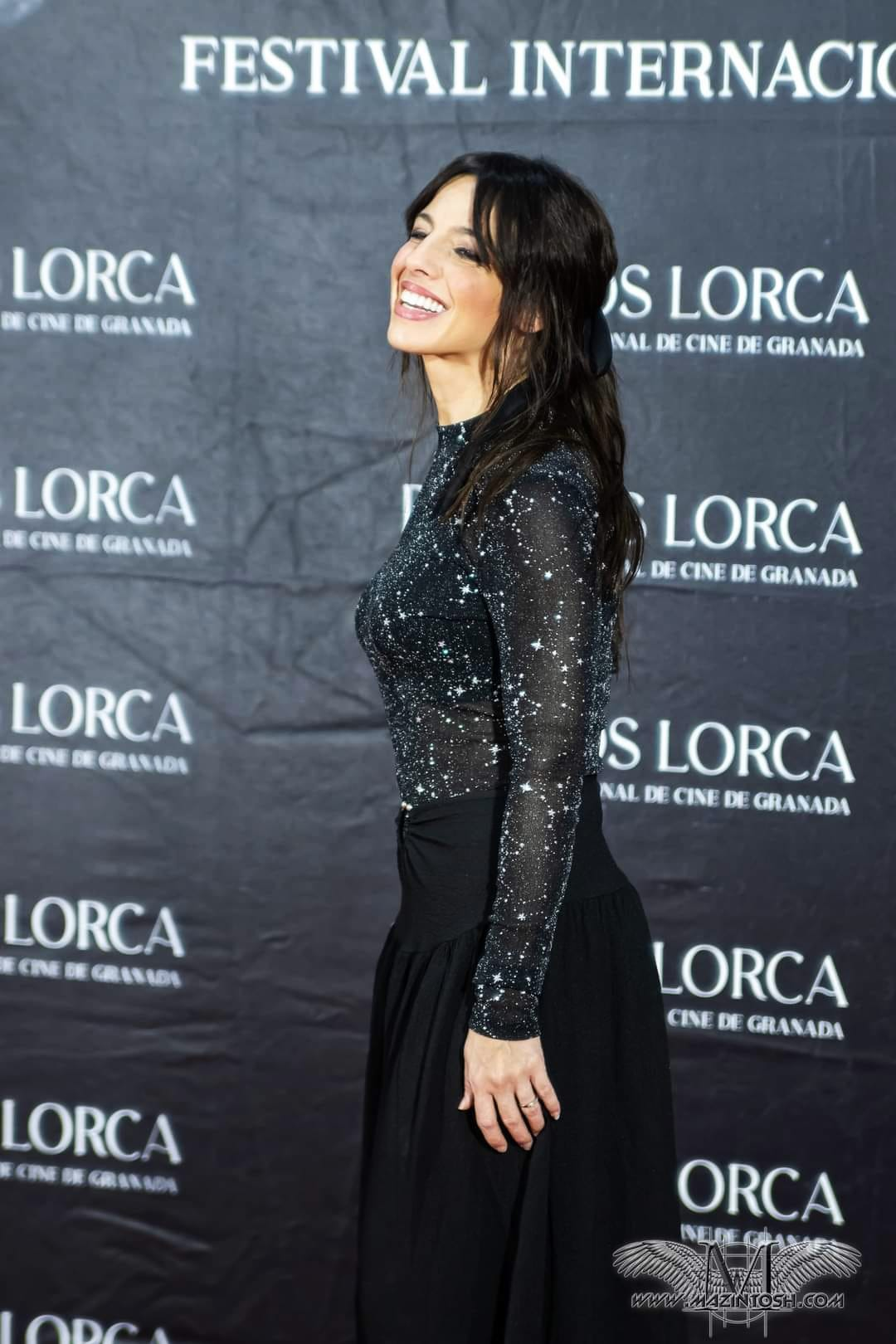
- Born: Cristina Mediero Pérez; July 8, 1984 (age 41); Madrid, Spain
- Occupations: Actress; director
- Years active: 2009–present
- Spouse: Carlos Aceituno

Cristina Mediero Pérez (born 8 July 1984) is a Spanish actress and director who works in theatre, film, and television. Born in Madrid and raised in Córdoba, she graduated from the Escuela Superior de Arte Dramático y Danza de Córdoba and later trained at the Instituto del Cine de Madrid. Based in Jaén, she co-founded the production company Loklaro Producciones with director Carlos Aceituno.

== Early life and education ==
Mediero was born in Madrid and moved to Córdoba at the age of ten. She graduated with a degree in Acting from the Escuela Superior de Arte Dramático y Danza de Córdoba.

Mediero returned to Madrid to study on-camera acting at the Instituto del Cine de Madrid (NIC), where she trained with instructors including Esteban Roel and Carla Carparsolo. She has continued her professional development through workshops with theatre directors Andrés Lima and Benito Zambrano, among others.

== Career ==
=== Theatre ===
Theatre has been a central part of Mediero's career since 2009, when she performed in La casa de Bernarda Alba in Andalusia. After relocating to Madrid, she co-starred in Trenes de Cine (2012), directed by Tamzin Townsend, and subsequently appeared in the musical La vida es una tómbola and a stage adaptation of El otro lado de la cama.

In 2016, she portrayed Barbara Fordham in the Spanish adaptation of Tracy Letts's August: Osage County, directed by Carlos Aceituno at the Teatro Infanta Leonor in Jaén during the XVII Festival de Otoño, drawing over 600 spectators.

Her 2019 production of El Ascensor, based on Alfonso Zurro's text 100 viajes en ascensor and directed by Carlos Aceituno, received nominations at the Premios Lorca de las Artes Escénicas de Andalucía for Best Author and Best Male Performer, and was selected for the Certamen Nacional de Artes Escénicas at Teatros Luchana in Madrid.

In 2020, she starred alongside Chema del Barco in Ushuaia by Alberto Conejero, and in 2021 she performed in ¡Ay, Carmela! by José Sanchis Sinisterra and in an adaptation of Bertolt Brecht's Mother Courage and Her Children, both directed by Carlos Aceituno through Loklaro Producciones.

=== Film ===
Mediero's first major film role was in Asesinos inocentes (2015), directed by Gonzalo Bendala, which was included in the Official Selection of the Málaga Film Festival.

In 2021, she starred in El hilo dorado, a social drama directed by Tomás Aceituno and set in Linares, alongside Loles León and Eva Pedraza. The film was broadcast on Canal Sur in 2022. Her performance earned her a nomination for Best Lead Actress at the inaugural Premios Carmen of the Academia de Cine de Andalucía, alongside Paz Vega and Petra Martínez.

Her most awarded film is Septiembre (2023), the debut feature of director Carlos Aceituno. The film won Mediero the Best Lead Actress award at the Granada International Film Festival – Premios Lorca in 2024.

Mediero made her directorial debut with the short film Night Show (2023), shot in English and addressing sexual violence and corporate abuse. It won the AAMMA Prize for Best National Short Film on Equality at the Mairena Internacional Film Festival.

=== Television ===
Mediero's television debut came in 2010 with La isla de los nominados (Cuatro), a comedy series parodying reality shows in which she played Sara Leal across eleven episodes. She subsequently appeared in the medical series Centro Médico (TVE) and the thriller El accidente (Telecinco).

She appeared in two seasons of the digital comedy-musical Mambo on RTVE's Playz platform. In 2019, she appeared as Azucena in the crime thriller Toy Boy (Antena 3/Netflix).

== Awards and recognition ==
| Year | Award | Category | Work | Result |
|---|---|---|---|---|
| 2017 | Semana de Jaén Audiovisual | Best Actress | Las sobrinas de Valerie | Won |
| 2020 | IX Kolkata Shorts International Film Festival | Best Actress | El Secreto de Lucía | Won |
| 2021 | Equilibrium Film Festival (Palermo) | Best Actress | Mamá | Won |
| 2022 | Premios Carmen (Academia de Cine de Andalucía) | Best Lead Actress | El hilo dorado | Nominated |
| 2023 | Premio Argentaria | Performing Arts | Career | Won |
| 2023 | AAMMA – Mairena Internacional Film Festival | Best National Short Film on Equality | Night Show | Won |
| 2024 | Granada International Film Festival – Premios Lorca | Best Lead Actress | Septiembre | Won |
| 2025 | Premios Grajo (Jaén) | Grajo de Cine – Best Actress | Career | Won |

== Filmography ==
=== Film ===
| Year | Title | Director | Notes |
|---|---|---|---|
| 2015 | Asesinos inocentes | Gonzalo Bendala | |
| 2016 | La Ama | Arantxa Ibarra, Luisje Moyano | |
| 2016 | Salpicados por el desastre | Juan Antonio Anguita | |
| 2017 | Doce días de mierda | Juan Antonio Anguita | |
| 2020 | Unfollow | Arturo Montenegro | |
| 2021 | El hilo dorado | Tomás Aceituno | |
| 2021 | Mandylion | Luisje Moyano | |
| 2023 | Septiembre | Carlos Aceituno | |

=== Television ===
| Year | Title | Channel | Role | Notes |
|---|---|---|---|---|
| 2010 | La isla de los nominados | Cuatro | Sara Leal | 11 episodes |
| 2015 | BYB | Telecinco | | |
| 2016 | Centro Médico | TVE | Elisa Jiménez | |
| 2016 | LAG | Flooxer (Atresmedia) | | |
| 2017 | El accidente | Telecinco | Reporter | 2 episodes |
| 2018 | Mambo | Playz (RTVE) | Amaia | |
| 2019 | Toy Boy | Antena 3/Netflix | Azucena | 2 episodes |
| 2023 | La cuarta bestia | | | Pilot |

=== Short films (selected) ===
| Year | Title | Director | Notes |
|---|---|---|---|
| 2015 | Las sobrinas de Valerie | Carlos Aceituno | |
| 2017 | Stanbrook | Carlos Aceituno | |
| 2020 | El secreto de Lucía | Raquel Toledo | |
| 2021 | Mamá | Carlos Aceituno | |
| 2023 | Night Show | Cristina Mediero | Directorial debut |

=== Theatre (selected) ===
| Year | Title | Director | Notes |
|---|---|---|---|
| 2009 | La casa de Bernarda Alba | Manuel Chalana | |
| 2012 | Trenes de Cine | Tamzin Townsend | |
| 2014 | El otro lado de la cama | José Manuel Pardo | Musical |
| 2014 | Salvajes | Carlos Aceituno | Based on God of Carnage |
| 2016 | August: Osage County | Carlos Aceituno | As Barbara Fordham |
| 2019 | El Ascensor | Carlos Aceituno | Based on Alfonso Zurro |
| 2020 | Ushuaia | Carlos Aceituno | Text by Alberto Conejero |
| 2021 | ¡Ay, Carmela! | Carlos Aceituno | Text by José Sanchis Sinisterra |
| 2021 | Mother Courage and Her Children | Carlos Aceituno | |
