= Pepe Martínez (guitarist) =

Spanish flamenco guitarist (1922–1984)

Pepe Martinez

Background information
- Born: José Martínez León; 8 September 1922
- Origin: Macarena, Seville; Spain
- Genres: Flamenco music
- Occupations: Composer, Guitarist
- Instrument: Guitar
- Labels: Decca, Fontana

José Martínez León (8 September 1922 – 1984), better known as Pepe Martínez, was a Spanish flamenco guitarist born into a musical family, in the Seville quarter of Macarena. His mother, Isabel, was famous for her singing of religiously inspired Saetas, a vocal style which has since been incorporated into the flamenco palo.

== Career ==
Martínez was a virtuoso exponent of 'Flamenco Lírico', a style of playing which emphasises the melodic as well as rhythmic elements of flamenco. His musical style reflected his warm personality. His playing, even more than many other flamenco guitarists of the time, was strongly influenced by that of his mentor, Ramón Montoya.

Martínez initially excelled in accompanying the cante and baile before developing a solo concert career. As an accompanist he played with such artists as Pepe Marchena, Niña de los Peines, Pepe Pinto, Juanito Valderrama, Niña de la Puebla, Niña de Antequera, Pepe Aznalcollar, Pepe Guillena, Niño de la Huerta amongst others.

Martínez was cited by Carlos Montoya, in the New York Guitar Review, as being one of the very finest flamenco guitarists of his generation along with Manolo de Huelva, Sabicas, Mario Escudero and Niño Ricardo.

Martínez made many recordings throughout his career, in Spain, France and the UK, on Columbia, Belter, Discophone, HMV, Odeon, Hispavox, Decca, Odean, Guilde Internationale du Disque and Discophon.

The BBC made a documentary about his life called My Friend Pepe Martinez (1970) which was part of a series of programs about the spirit of Spain. Pepe also featured, along with Andrés Segovia, in a French television film titled Sortileges du Flamenco.

During his career, Martínez played guitars by Arcángel Fernández, Marcelo Barbero and Manuel Reyes. It was Martínez who introduced the young Manuel Reyes to the workshop of Marcelo Barbero.

His pupil, Malcolm Weller, of the Spanish Guitar Centre, owns his Barbero guitar.

== Partial discography ==
=== LPs ===
- The Lyrical Guitar of Pepe Martinez (Fontana TL 5207) – UK 1964
- Pepe Martinez – (eponymous album) (Decca C 7811) – Spain 1973
- In Old Seville
- Alegrias Flamencas – Pepe Martinez and Los Flamencos. (Concert Hall Synchro Stereo SMS 2456)

=== CDs ===
- Arte Flamenco, Vol. 8
- Vintage Flamenco Guitarra Nº 3
- Vintage Flamenco Guitarra Nº 4
- Vintage Flamenco Guitarra Nº 9
- The Spanish Guitar
