= When Brooklyn Met Seville =

- Theatrical release poster
- Spanish: Sevillanas de Brooklyn
- Directed by: Vicente Villanueva
- Written by: Juan R. Apolo; Nacho La Casa
- Produced by: Nacho La Casa; José Alba
- Starring: Carolina Yuste; Sergio Momo; Estefanía de los Santos; Manolo Solo
- Cinematography: Luis Ángel Pérez
- Edited by: Ana Álvarez Ossorio
- Music by: Riki Rivera
- Production companies: Capitán Araña; Pecado Films; 700 pavos AIE
- Distributed by: Filmax
- Release dates: 9 June 2021 (Málaga); 17 September 2021 (Spain)
- Running time: 97 minutes
- Country: Spain
- Language: Spanish

When Brooklyn Met Seville (Spanish: Sevillanas de Brooklyn) is a 2021 Spanish comedy film directed by Vicente Villanueva, which stars Carolina Yuste and Sergio Momo, also featuring Estefanía de los Santos and Manolo Solo. It blends elements of romantic comedy and family comedy.

== Plot ==
Facing eviction from her home in a rough Sevillian neighborhood, Carmen decides to scam an agency into renting a room to Ariel Brooklyn (an Afro-American foreign student from a well-off family) in exchange of €700. Meanwhile, Carmen's daughter, Ana, is desperate to leave the neighborhood.

== Cast ==
- Carolina Yuste as Ana.
- Sergio Momo as Ariel Brooklyn
- Estefanía de los Santos as Carmen
- Manolo Solo as Antonio
- Canco Rodríguez as Jesús
- Andrea Haro as Auxi
- María Alfonso Rosso as abuela
- Adelfa Calvo as directora de la agencia
- Neizan Fernández as Wisconsin

== Production ==
Directed by Vicente Villanueva, the film was written by Juan Apolo and Nacho La Casa. Featuring a budget of around 2.6 million €, the film was produced by Capitán Araña and Pecado Films alongside 700 pavos AIE, with the participation of RTVE, Canal Sur and Movistar+, support from the Junta de Andalucía and funding from ICAA, ICO and Crea SGR. Shooting began in Alcalá de Guadaíra by July 2020.

Composed by Riki Rivera, the score feature songs performed by Gerónimo Rauch, Vanesa Martín and Miguel Poveda.

== Release ==
The film was presented on 9 June 2021 at the 24th Málaga Film Festival, as part of the festival's official selection, but out of competition. Distributed by Filmax, the film was theatrically released in Spain on 17 September 2021.

== Reception ==
Anton Merikaetxebarria of El Correo gave the film 1 out of 3 stars, describing it as "typical costumbrista plot, full of clichés about the Andalusian people, in which bits of social criticism are inserted", otherwise highlighting Yuste's performance as the best thing about the film.

Declaring himself unable to withstand ten minutes of the film's tone and manners, Manuel J. Lombardo of Diario de Sevilla considered that the film exploits "the most stale clichés about class differences" in a sort of a "decaffeinated sainete".

Sergio F. Pinilla of Cinemanía gave the film 4½ out of 5 stars, considering it a "delicious" film "blending the idiosyncratic, miscegenation and class struggle" in which Villanueva finds "the right balance between hilarity, movement and emotion".

Pablo Vázquez of Fotogramas gave it 3 out of 5 stars, finding Yuste's performance to be the best of the film whereas negatively assessing "some somewhat questionable plot licenses" as the worst thing of the film.

Beatriz Martínez of El Periódico de Catalunya gave the film 3 out of 5 stars, considering it a "cocktail full of wit in which the overwhelming [presence of] Estefanía de los Santos, who plays the matriarch of the clan, becomes the real queen of the show".

== Awards and nominations ==
Year	Award	Category	Nominee(s)	Result	Ref.
2022	1st Carmen Awards	Best Fiction Feature Film	Pecado Films	Nominated	
2022	1st Carmen Awards	Best Actress	Estefanía de los Santos	Nominated	
2022	1st Carmen Awards	Best Original Score	Riki Rivera	Nominated	
2022	1st Carmen Awards	Best Special Effects	Amparo Martínez	Nominated	
2022	1st Carmen Awards	Best Makeup and Hairstyles	Anabel Beato & Carmela Martín	Nominated	
2022	1st Carmen Awards	Best Art Direction	Lala Obrero	Nominated	
2022	1st Carmen Awards	Best Sound	Antonio Rodríguez, Jorge Marín	Nominated	
2022	1st Carmen Awards	Best New Actress	Andrea Haro	Nominated	
2022	1st Carmen Awards	Best Editing	Ana Álvarez-Ossorio	Won	
2022	1st Carmen Awards	Best Costume Design	Lourdes Fuentes	Nominated	
2022	1st Carmen Awards	Best Supporting Actor	Manolo Solo	Nominated	

== See also ==
- List of Spanish films of 2021
