= Alegría (2021 film) =

- Theatrical release poster
- Directed by: Violeta Salama
- Written by: Violeta Salama; Isa Sánchez
- Starring: Cecilia Suárez; Laia Manzanares; Sarah Perles; Mara Guil; Leonardo Sbaraglia
- Cinematography: Pau Esteve Birba
- Production companies: La Claqueta PC; Powehi Films; La Cruda Realidad; Alegría La Película A.I.E.; 9 AM Media Lab
- Distributed by: Caramel Films
- Release dates: October 2021 (FICG); 10 December 2021 (Spain)
- Country: Spain
- Budget: €2.4 million

Alegría is a 2021 Spanish comedy-drama directed by Violeta Salama. The cast stars Cecilia Suárez as the title character, also featuring Laia Manzanares, Sarah Perles, Mara Guil and Leonardo Sbaraglia.

== Premise ==
The film—presented as a "feelgood movie"— is set in Melilla, exploring the blend of cultures in the city, including identity, religious and family issues. After some time installed in the city, Alegría rediscovers her Jewish roots in the wake of the wedding of her niece Yael.

== Cast ==
- Cecilia Suárez as Alegría
- Laia Manzanares as Yael
- Sarah Perles as Dunia
- Mara Guil
- Leonardo Sbaraglia as Simón
- Adelfa Calvo as madre de Jacobo ('Jacobo's mother')
- Emilio Palacios as Jacobo
- Zohar Liba as hermano de Alegría ('Alegría's brother')
- Joe Manjón
- María Luisa Mayol

== Production ==
Alegría was produced by La Claqueta and Powehi Films alongside La Cruda Realidad, Alegría La Película AIE and 9 AM Media Lab, with the participation of RTVE and support from the ICAA, the department of Culture of the Junta de Andalucía, and the department of Culture and Equality of the autonomous city of Melilla. The film had a €2.4 million budget. Filming began in February 2021 and wrapped in March 2021. Besides Melilla, shooting locations included Seville and other places in Andalusia. The film was written by the director Violeta Salama alongside Isa Sánchez. Pau Esteve Birba took over the cinematography.

== Release ==
The film premiered at the 36th Guadalajara International Film Festival (FCIG) in October 2021, and will also screen at the 18th Seville European Film Festival (SEFF) in November 2021. Distributed by Caramel Films, the film is set for a 10 December 2021 theatrical release in Spain.

== Awards and nominations ==
| Year | Award | Category | Nominee(s) | Result | Ref. |
|---|---|---|---|---|---|
| 2022 | 1st Carmen Awards | Best Fiction Feature Film | La Claqueta PC | Nominated | |
| 2022 | 1st Carmen Awards | Best Screenplay | Isa Sánchez, Violeta Salama | Nominated | |
| 2022 | 1st Carmen Awards | Best Production Supervision | Manolo Limón | Nominated | |
| 2022 | 1st Carmen Awards | Best New Director | Violeta Salama | Nominated | |
| 2022 | 1st Carmen Awards | Best Special Effects | Amparo Martínez | Nominated | |
| 2022 | 1st Carmen Awards | Best Makeup and Hairstyles | Félix Terrero, Yolanda Piña | Nominated | |
| 2022 | 1st Carmen Awards | Best Art Direction | Pepe Domínguez | Won | |
| 2022 | 1st Carmen Awards | Best Sound | Jorge Marín, Sara Marín | Nominated | |
| 2022 | 1st Carmen Awards | Best Editing | José M. G. Moyano | Nominated | |
| 2022 | 1st Carmen Awards | Best Supporting Actress | Mara Guil | Nominated | |
| 2022 | 1st Carmen Awards | Best Cinematography | Pau Esteve | Nominated | |

== See also ==
- List of Spanish films of 2021
