= Undercover Wedding Crashers =

- Theatrical release poster
- Spanish: Operación Camarón
- Directed by: Carlos Therón
- Written by: Manuel Burque; Josep Gatell
- Based on: Song'e Napule by the Manetti Bros.
- Starring: Julián López; Natalia de Molina; Carlos Librado; Miren Ibarguren
- Music by: Riki Rivera
- Production companies: Telecinco Cinema; La Pepa Films; La Pepa La Película A.I.E; La Zona Films; Quexito Films
- Distributed by: Buena Vista International
- Release dates: 4 June 2021 (Málaga); 24 June 2021 (Spain)
- Country: Spain
- Language: Spanish
- Box office: €3.3 million

Undercover Wedding Crashers (Spanish: Operación Camarón) is a 2021 Spanish action comedy film directed by Carlos Therón which stars Julián López, Natalia de Molina, Carlos Librado and Miren Ibarguren, among others. It is an adaptation of the 2013 Italian film Song'e Napule.

== Plot ==
The fiction is set in Cádiz. Sebas, a police agent with musical training, goes undercover as a keyboard player in a flamenco-trap band, Los Lolos, which is about to perform at the wedding of the daughter of an important narco.

== Cast ==
- Julián López as Sebas
- Natalia de Molina as Luci
- Carlos Librado as Lolo
- Miren Ibarguren as Pepa
- Canco Rodríguez as Mula
- Julián Villagrán as Blas
- Paco Tous as Jaime
- Antonio Dechent
- Adelfa Calvo
- Alberto López
- Manuel Burque as Gallego

== Production ==
Undercover Wedding Crashers is a remake of the 2013 Italian film Song'e Napule by Antonio and Marco Manetti. It was written by Manuel Burque and Josep Gatell. The film was produced by Telecinco Cinema, La Pepa Films and La Pepa La Película A.I.E, in association with La Zona Films and Quexito Films. It had the participation of Mediaset España, Movistar+ and Mediterráneo Mediaset España Group and funding from the ICAA.

Filming lasted for seven weeks. Shooting locations included the provinces of Seville and Cádiz.

== Release ==
Initially intended to be theatrically released in Spain on 13 March 2020, the release was postponed to 11 September 2020 due to the COVID-19 pandemic, which caused the shelving of all Telecinco Cinema titles pending for theatrical release. Postponed again, its release was eventually rescheduled for 24 June 2021.

The film was screened (as part of the festival's official selection but out of the competition) at the 24th Málaga Film Festival on 4 June 2021. The film was distributed by Buena Vista International. The release of the movie was extensively teased by Mediaset España in all its television stations (including Euro 2020 matches), to the extent that the reiteration generated online memes about it. The film grossed €3.3 million at the box-office.

== Reception ==
Raquel Hernández Luján of HobbyConsolas gave the film a score of 70/100, praising the well played humour and the "sensational" comic talent of the cast. She negatively pointed out that the ending was too cheesy.

Beatriz Martínez of El Periódico de Catalunya gave the film 4 stars out of 5, writing that it had a "good screenplay, good cast and jokes that are not cringeworthy".

Juan Pando of Fotogramas gave the film 4 out of 5 stars. In his view, the screenplay written by Burque and Gatell featured "simple but effective jokes". He pointed out at the predominance of "lighthearted humour", despite the crime themes. He praised the comedy talent and the chemistry of the cast.

Andrea G. Bermejo of Cinemanía gave it 4 out of 5 stars, presenting Operación Camarón as "a film that respects the rich intonations of our (Spanish) geographic diversity with actors who are natives or have mastered the (regional) accents perfectly".

Javier Ocaña of El País found his only possible objection towards the film to be that the film was a remake of an Italian title, insofar that circumstance entailed an "evident lack of risk-taking capacity and less creativity". He considered however that the film actually delivered better "rhythm, staging, editing, dialogues, comic timing, tempo and performances" than the original Italian version.

Josu Eguren of El Correo gave the film 2 out of 3 stars, deeming it "refreshing, lively and catchy". He pointed out at the "priceless" bitchy deliveries by Miren Ibarguren, who is claiming—according to the reviewer—"the title of best comedic actress" in Spain.

== Awards and nominations ==
Year	Award	Category	Nominee(s)	Result	Ref.
2022	1st Carmen Awards	Best Production Supervision	Manuela Ocón	Won	
2022	1st Carmen Awards	Best Original Song	Riki Rivera & Violeta Arriaza	Won	
2022	1st Carmen Awards	Best Original Score	Riki Rivera	Won	
2022	1st Carmen Awards	Best Makeup and Hairstyles	Yolanda Piña & Félix Terrero	Nominated	
2022	1st Carmen Awards	Best New Actor	Juanlu González	Nominated	
2022	1st Carmen Awards	Best New Actor	Xisco González	Nominated	
2022	1st Carmen Awards	Best Sound	Dani de Zayas	Won	
2022	1st Carmen Awards	Best Supporting Actress	Natalia de Molina	Won	
2022	1st Carmen Awards	Best Costume Design	Esther Vaquero	Won	

== Sequel ==
At the 22nd Seville European Film Festival in November 2025, it was reported the development of a sequel set in Galicia entitled Operación Camarón 2 due to begin filming in May 2026.

== See also ==
- List of Spanish films of 2021
