= Remedios Montero Martínez =

Spanish guerrilla (1927–2010)

Remedios Montero Martínez (Beamud Mountains, Cuenca 1927 – Valencia, October 24, 2010), or, as she is commonly known, “Celia”, was a significant guerrilla who fought against the ideals of Franco. Celia was one of the few Spanish guerrilla fighters in the Spanish Civil War, and she was close friends with the great Florián Garcia Velasco, leader of the Guerrilla Group of Levante and Aragón. Her life has provided inspiration for the film “Memories of a Guerrilla,” which also served as the basis for Dulce Chacón to write her novel “The Sleeping Voice,” which later was made into a movie of the same title by director Benito Zambrano.

== Biography ==
First years and Spanish Civil War

Remedios Montero “Celia” joined the Guerrilla Group of Levante and Aragón when she was just a teenager. The Civil Guard discovered which revolutionary group she was a part of, and she subsequently escaped to the mountains before she was arrested. It was there that she adopted the name “Celia” and became a maqui.

Celia lost her father and her brother in the Spanish Civil War. Her brother was killed in an ambush by Civil Guards who posed as anti-Fascist guerrillas. The tragic passing of her father and brother was painful for Celia, as she tells in the memories of her book.

Maqui Period and Exile

Celia's first period of exile began at the end of the Civil War, when she escaped to the mountains and joined the maquis. She stayed there with other guerrilla fighters from 1949 until 1952. It was around this time when she met her future husband Florián García “El Grande."

Six years later, the guerrilla fighters were ordered to withdraw from France. Celia abandoned the mountains and went back into exile, this time to Paris, where she continued to fight for Spain's freedom.

Return to Spain

Celia returned to Spain for a clandestine mission of the Communist Party. She was discovered by the Civil Guard in Salamanca and was moved as a detainee to Madrid, where she was cruelly tortured and imprisoned. Her injuries from these beatings were so severe that it later prevented her from having children. She spent eight years in prison, where she received false news that her close friend Florián had died.

Reunited in Prague

When Celia was released from prison, she returned to exile. She managed to obtain a fake passport and fled to France before traveling to Prague for an official mission. It was there that she was reunited with Florián. This was an emotional reunion for both Celia and Florián because both thought that the other had died after spending roughly 8 years apart. The two were soon married in Prague.

Final Return to Spain

In 1978, after the death of Franco during the embryonic transition, Celia and Florián returned to Spain and settled down in Valencia.

On October 24 of 2010, Celia died, just one year after the passing of her great friend and husband.
