= 30th Actors and Actresses Union Awards =

2022 Spanish award ceremony

- Date: 14 March 2022
- Site: Circo Price, Madrid, Spain
- Hosted by: Gloria Albalate
- Organized by: Actors and Actresses Union

Highlights
- Honorary career award: Ángela Molina

The 30th Actors and Actresses Union Awards ceremony was held on 14 March 2022 at the Circo Price in Madrid. The gala was hosted by Gloria Albalate.

In addition to the competitive awards, Asociación APRAM received the 'Mujeres en Unión' award, Ángela Molina the 'A toda una vida' career award and Fernando Marín the Special Award. Nominations were announced on 7 February 2022.

== Winners and nominees ==
The winners and nominees are listed as follows:

=== Film ===
Best Male Performance in a Leading Role: Javier Bardem — The Good Boss; Javier Gutiérrez — The Daughter; Luis Tosar — Maixabel	Best Female Performance in a Leading Role: Petra Martínez — That Was Life; Penélope Cruz — Parallel Mothers; Blanca Portillo — Maixabel
Best Male Performance in a Secondary Role: Óscar de la Fuente — The Good Boss; Urko Olazabal — Maixabel; Manolo Solo — The Good Boss	Best Female Performance in a Secondary Role: Sonia Almarcha — The Good Boss; Anna Castillo — That Was Life; Aitana Sánchez-Gijón — Parallel Mothers
Best Male Performance in a Minor Role: Fernando Albizu — The Good Boss; Pedro Casablanc — My Heart Goes Boom!; Fernando Tejero — The House of Snails	Best Female Performance in a Minor Role: Arantxa Aranguren — Maixabel; Mara Guil — The Good Boss; Carolina Yuste — Girlfriends

=== Television ===
Best Male Performance in a Leading Role: Javier Cámara — Venga Juan; Raúl Arévalo — Riot Police; Álex García — Riot Police	Best Female Performance in a Leading Role: Candela Peña — Hierro; Úrsula Corberó — Money Heist; Michelle Jenner — The Cook of Castamar
Best Male Performance in a Secondary Role: Fernando Cayo — Money Heist; Alfonso Bassave — Estoy vivo; Karra Elejalde — La Fortuna	Best Female Performance in a Secondary Role: Ana Labordeta — Madres. Amor y vida; Belén Cuesta — Money Heist; Natalia Verbeke — ANA. all in
Best Male Performance in a Minor Role: Patrick Criado — Riot Police; Alberto Amarilla — Money Heist; Secun de la Rosa — 30 Coins	Best Female Performance in a Minor Role: Roser Pujol — The Cook of Castamar; Ester Expósito — Veneno; Rebeca Sala — HIT

=== Theatre ===
Best Male Performance in a Leading Role: Juan Diego Botto — Una noche sin luna; Francesco Carril — El bar que se tragó a todos los españoles; Jorge Usón — Con lo bien que estábamos (Ferretería Esteban)	Best Female Performance in a Leading Role: Silvia de Pé — El caballero incierto; Ana Belén — Antonio y Cleopatra; Nathalie Poza — Prostitución
Best Male Performance in a Secondary Role: Jesús Noguero — El bar que se tragó a todos los españoles; Jorge Calvo — Las criadas; Eduardo Velasco — La fiesta del chivo	Best Female Performance in a Secondary Role: Alba Flores — Shock 2 (La tormenta y la guerra); Patricia Domínguez — Noche de reyes; Diana Palazón — Los pazos de Ulloa
Best Male Performance in a Minor Role: Guillermo Toledo — Shock 1 (El cóndor y el puma); Luis Rallo — Antonio y Cleopatra; José Luis Torrijo — Nápoles millonaria	Best Female Performance in a Minor Role: Alba Enríquez — Troyanas; Verónica Ronda — Histeria del arte; Elisa Hipólito — Billy Elliot the Musical

=== Newcomers ===
Best New Actor: Tarik Rmili — The Good Boss; Jean Cruz — The Cook of Castamar; Víctor Palmero — Johnny Chico	Best New Actress: Almudena Amor — The Good Boss; Esther Isla — Los pazos de Ulloa; Begoña Vargas — Outlaws

=== International productions ===
Best Male Performance in an International Production: Ginés García Millán — Who Killed Sara?; Javier Bardem — Dune; Álvaro Morte — The Wheel of Time	Best Female Performance in an International Production: Ana de Armas — No Time to Die; Penélope Cruz — Official Competition; Lola Casamayor — Luis Miguel: The Series
