= Antequera (disambiguation) =

Antequera may refer to:

== Places ==
- Antequera, a city and municipality Andalusia, Spain
- Antequera, Bohol, a municipality in the Philippines
- Antequera District, San Pedro Department, Paraguay
- Antequera, Mexico, now named Oaxaca

== People ==
- Francisco Antequera (born 1964), Spanish racing cyclist
- José de Antequera y Castro (1689–1731), lawyer, judge, and insurrectionist in the Viceroyalty of Peru
- Niña de Antequera (1920–1972), Spanish flamenco singer

== Other uses ==
- Antequera CF, an association football team based in Antequera, Andalusia
- BM Antequera, a handball team based in Antequera, Andalusia
- Roman Catholic Archdiocese of Antequera, Oaxaca, based in Oaxaca, Mexico
- Antequera (moth), a genus of moth
