= Vicente Romero (actor) =

Spanish actor

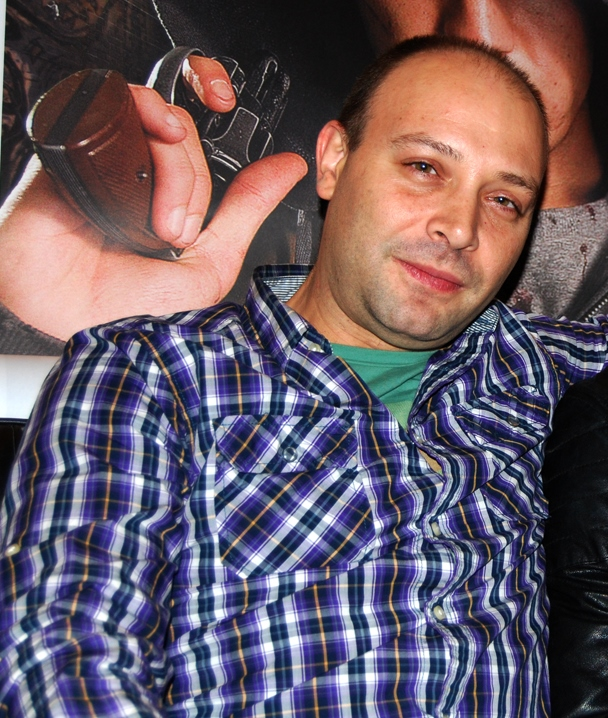
- During the presentation of Neon Flesh in 2011
- Born: 1969 (age 56–57); Seville, Spain
- Occupation: Actor

Vicente Romero (born 1969) is a Spanish actor from Andalusia. He is primarily recognised for his supporting performances.

== Biography ==
Born in 1969 in Seville, he was raised in Las 3000 Viviendas neighborhood.

He made his television acting debut in 2001 in Hospital Central. Romero's performance as El Maquea in the Benito Zambrano's 2002 miniseries Padre coraje earned him an Actors and Actresses Union Award for Best New Actor in 2003. He landed a role in Jaime Rosales' 2003 film The Hours of the Day, followed by performances in films such as Light Hours, 7 Virgins, and The Night of the Sunflowers. Primarily recognised as a seasoned supporting actor, he is often cast in villain roles.

== Filmography ==
=== Film ===
| Year | Title | Role | Notes | Ref. |
|---|---|---|---|---|
| 2003 | Las horas del día (The Hours of the Day) | Marcos | | |
| 2004 | Horas de luz (Hours of Light) | Morata | | |
| 2005 | 7 vírgenes (7 Virgins) | Santacana | | |
| 2006 | La noche de los girasoles (The Night of the Sunflowers) | Tomás | | |
| 2008 | 3 días (Before the Fall) | Marcial | | |
| 2009 | Celda 211 (Cell 211) | Tachuela | | |
| 2010 | Carne de neón (Neon Flesh) | Angelito | | |
| 2010 | Entrelobos | Hocicotocino | | |
| 2012 | The Pelayos (Winning Streak) | Balón | | |
| 2016 | Secuestro (Boy Missing) | Carreño | | |
| 2017 | La sombra de la ley (Gun City) | Rediú | | |
| 2019 | Adiós (Bye) | Andrés | | |
| 2019 | Intemperie (Out in the Open) | Triana | | |
| 2021 | Érase una vez en Euskadi (Once Upon a Time in Euskadi) | Anselmo | | |
| 2021 | Cuidado con lo que deseas (Magical Christmas) | Joaquín | | |
| 2024 | El 47 (The 47) | Ortega | | |
| 2026 | Dante | Santos | | |

=== Television ===
| Year | Title | Role | Notes | Ref |
|---|---|---|---|---|
| 2002 | Padre coraje | El Maquea | | |
| 2011 | Crematorio | Sarcós | | |
| 2011 | 14 de abril. La República | Paco "el Rubio" | | |
| 2015–16 | Bajo sospecha | Rafael Vidal | | |
| 2017 | Tiempos de guerra (Morocco: Love in Times of War) | Comandante Silva | | |
| 2019 | Malaka | Quino | | |
| 2022 | Express | Santiago Roldán | | |
| 2022 | La novia gitana (The Gypsy Bride) | Orduño | | |
| 2023 | La red púrpura (The Purple Network) | Orduño | | |
| 2025 | The Walking Dead: Daryl Dixon | Chofo | Episode: "Limbo" | |

== Accolades ==
| Year | Award | Category | Work | Result | Ref. |
|---|---|---|---|---|---|
| 2003 | 12th Actors and Actresses Union Awards | Best New Actor | Padre coraje | Won | |
| 2022 | 1st Carmen Awards | Best Supporting Actor | Once Upon a Time in Euskadi | Nominated | |
| 2023 | 10th Feroz Awards | Best Supporting Actor in a TV Series | The Gypsy Bride | Nominated | |
| 2025 | 4th Carmen Awards | Best Supporting Actor | May I Speak with the Enemy? | Nominated | |
