= Once Upon a Time in Euskadi =

- Theatrical release poster
- Spanish: Érase una vez en Euskadi
- Directed by: Manu Gómez
- Screenplay by: Manu Gómez
- Produced by: Beatriz Bodegas
- Starring: Asier Flores; Aitor Calderón; Miguel Rivera; Hugo García; Luis Callejo; Marian Álvarez; Vicente Vergara; Pilar Gómez; Vicente Romero
- Cinematography: Javier Salmones
- Edited by: Ángel Hernández Zoido
- Music by: Aránzazu Calleja
- Production companies: La Canica Films; Érase mi cuadrilla AIE
- Distributed by: eOne
- Release dates: 22 September 2021 (Zinemaldia); 29 October 2021 (Spain)
- Country: Spain
- Language: Spanish

Once Upon a Time in Euskadi (Spanish: Érase una vez en Euskadi) is a 2021 Spanish coming-of-age drama film written and directed by Manu Gómez. It stars Asier Flores, Aitor Calderón, Miguel Rivera, and Hugo García alongside Luis Callejo, Marian Álvarez, Vicente Vergara, Pilar Gómez, and Vicente Romero.

== Plot ==
Set in the summer of 1985 in the Basque Country against the backdrop of the Basque Conflict, the plot tracks the stories of a group of four children with a maketo Andalusian immigrant background.

== Cast ==
- Asier Flores as Marcos
- Aitor Calderón as Toni
- Miguel Rivera as Paquito
- Hugo García as José Antonio
- Luis Callejo as Jesús
- Marian Álvarez as Carmen
- Vicente Vergara as Mariano
- Pilar Gómez as Josefa
- Vicente Romero as Anselmo
- María Isasi as Pura
- María Alfonsa Rosso as Concha
- Arón Piper as Maserati
- Yon González as Félix
- Ruth Díaz as Dolores
- Josean Bengoetxea as Luis Mari

== Production ==
The film was produced by La Canica Films alongside Érase mi cuadrilla AIE, with the participation of Historias del Tío Luis, RTVE, and EiTB, funding from the ICAA, and the collaboration of CreaSGR and the Gipuzkoa Foral Deputation. Shooting locations included Arrasate, Azkoaga, Bergara, Eibar, Elgeta, Elgoibar, Oñati, Soraluze-Placencia de las Armas, and Zumarraga.

== Release ==
The film premiered in the 'RTVE Gala' of the 69th San Sebastián International Film Festival (Zinemaldia) on 22 September 2021. Distributed by eOne, it was released theatrically in Spain on 29 October 2021.

== Critical reception ==
Roger Salvans of Fotogramas rated the film 3 out of 5 stars highlighting the "truth and innocence" pertaining the gang of children as the film's best while negatively citing some overly dramatic final twists.

Toni Vall of Cinemanía rated the film 3 out of 5 stars, underscoring it to be "a skillful dive into the lives of three friends whose world is teetering".

Raquel Hernández Luján of HobbyConsolas rated the film with 80 points ('very good'), highlighting "the setting, the most unexpected plot twists and the children's innocent look at a convulsive and complex social situation".

== Accolades ==
Year	Award	Category	Nominee(s)	Result	Ref.
2022	1st Carmen Awards	Best Supporting Actor	Vicente Romero	Nominated	
2022	1st Carmen Awards	Best Supporting Actress	María Alfonsa Rosso	Nominated	
2022	1st Carmen Awards	Best Sound	Diana Sagrista	Nominated	

== See also ==
- List of Spanish films of 2021
