= That Was Life =

- Theatrical release poster
- Spanish: La vida era eso
- Directed by: David Martín de los Santos
- Written by: David Martín de los Santos
- Produced by: Damián París; José Carlos Conde
- Starring: Petra Martínez; Anna Castillo
- Cinematography: Santiago Racaj
- Production companies: Lolita Films; Mediaevs; Magnética Cine; Smiz&Pixel
- Distributed by: Elamedia Estudios
- Release dates: November 2020 (SEFF); December 10, 2021 (Spain)
- Running time: 109 minutes
- Country: Spain
- Language: Spanish

That Was Life (Spanish: La vida era eso) is a 2020 Spanish drama film directed and written by David Martín de los Santos. It stars Petra Martínez and Anna Castillo as two Spanish immigrants who form a friendship after meeting in a hospital in Belgium.

== Plot ==
María and Verónica, two Spanish immigrants of different generations, meet in a hospital in Belgium where they form a friendship after an unexpected event. This leads María to embark on a journey of self discovery through the Spain she left many decades ago.

== Cast ==
- Petra Martínez as María
- Anna Castillo as Verónica
- Florin Piersic Jr. as Luca
- Ramón Barea as José
- Daniel Morilla as Juan
- María Isabel Díaz Lago as Iloveny
- Pilar Gómez as Conchi
- Annick Weerts as Elisa
- Christophe Miraval as Pedro
- Maarten Dannenberg as Julio
- Alina Nastase as Cristina

== Production ==
The film began shooting in May 2019 in different locations of Spain in Almeria and Cabo de Gata, later in Ghent, Belgium. Santiago Racaj was the cinematographer and Javier Chavarría was the production designer. Other credits include Tonucha Vidal (casting director), Eva Valiño (sound) and Miguel Doblado (editing).

== Release ==
The film was screened at the 17th Seville European Film Festival (SEFF), where it won the ASECAN award for Best Film and Best Actress for Petra Martínez. The film had to postpone its release in cinemas several times due to the COVID-19 pandemic, ultimately being scheduled to be released on December 10, 2021.

== Critical reception ==
The performance of Martínez was met with acclaim. Demetrios Matheou from Screen International wrote that "Martinez, well into her seventies when she shot this, gives a strong, minimalist performance". Writing for Cineuropa, Alfonso Rivera commented that "David Martín de los Santos makes his debut in fiction with a humble, emotional and intimate film, that supports its subtle theme over the experienced performance of the great Petra Martínez".

== Accolades ==
| Year | Award | Category | Nominee(s) | Result | Ref. |
|---|---|---|---|---|---|
| 2021 | 27th Forqué Awards | Best Actress (film) | Petra Martínez | Nominated | |
| 2021 | 34th ASECAN Awards | Best Film | | Nominated | |
| 2021 | 34th ASECAN Awards | Best Director | David Martín de los Santos | Nominated | |
| 2021 | 34th ASECAN Awards | Best Screenplay | David Martín de los Santos | Nominated | |
| 2021 | 34th ASECAN Awards | Best Actress | Petra Martínez | Won | |
| 2022 | 9th Feroz Awards | Best Actress (film) | Petra Martínez | Won | |
| 2022 | 9th Feroz Awards | Best Supporting Actress (film) | Anna Castillo | Nominated | |
| 2022 | 1st Carmen Awards | Best Fiction Feature Film | La vida era eso AIE | Nominated | |
| 2022 | 1st Carmen Awards | Best Screenplay | David Martín de los Santos | Nominated | |
| 2022 | 1st Carmen Awards | Best Production Supervision | Damián Paris | Nominated | |
| 2022 | 1st Carmen Awards | Best Actress | Petra Martínez | Won | |
| 2022 | 1st Carmen Awards | Best Original Song | Estrella Morente & Fernando Vacas | Nominated | |
| 2022 | 1st Carmen Awards | Best New Director | David Martín de los Santos | Won | |
| 2022 | 1st Carmen Awards | Best Editing | Miguel Doblado | Nominated | |
| 2022 | 1st Carmen Awards | Best Supporting Actress | Pilar Gómez | Nominated | |
| 2022 | 77th CEC Medals | Best New Director | David Martín de los Santos | Won | |
| 2022 | 77th CEC Medals | Best Actress | Petra Martínez | Nominated | |
| 2022 | 36th Goya Awards | Best Actress | Petra Martínez | Nominated | |
| 2022 | 36th Goya Awards | Best New Director | David Martín de los Santos | Nominated | |
| 2022 | 30th Actors and Actresses Union Awards | Best Film Actress in a Leading Role | Petra Martínez | Won | |
| 2022 | 30th Actors and Actresses Union Awards | Best Film Actress in a Secondary Role | Anna Castillo | Nominated | |

== See also ==
- List of Spanish films of 2021
