= The House of Snails =

- Theatrical release poster
- Spanish: La casa del caracol
- Directed by: Macarena Astorga
- Screenplay by: Sandra García Nieto
- Based on: La casa del caracol by Sandra García Nieto
- Produced by: Álvaro Ariza Tirado
- Starring: Javier Rey; Paz Vega; Carlos Alcántara
- Cinematography: Valentín Álvarez
- Edited by: Beatriz Colomar
- Music by: Karin Zielinski
- Production companies: Esto también pasará; Casita Colorá Producciones AIE; Bowfinger International Pictures; Basque Films; Producciones Tondero; Hippo Entertainment Group
- Distributed by: Filmax (es)
- Release dates: 7 June 2021 (Málaga); 11 June 2021 (Spain)
- Running time: 104 minutes
- Countries: Spain; Peru; Mexico
- Language: Spanish

The House of Snails (Spanish: La casa del caracol) is a 2021 psychological thriller film with rural horror and fantasy elements directed by Macarena Astorga from a screenplay written by Sandra García Nieto, based on García Nieto's novel La casa del caracol which stars Javier Rey alongside Paz Vega and Carlos Alcántara.

== Plot ==
The plot is set in the 1970s in a fictional village ("Quintanar") in the Andalusian sierra, where Antonio Prieto, a writer addicted to mezcal rents a house there so he can write his novel in relative isolation. The mysterious folks and the village are connected to superstitions and rumours about a strange and frightening creature known as El Vímero.

== Cast ==
- Javier Rey as Antonio Prieto
- Paz Vega as Berta
- Norma Martínez as Carmen
- Pedro Casablanc as Sargento Mauri
- Carlos Alcántara as Padre Benito
- Elvira Mínguez as Justa
- Vicente Vergara as Carmelo
- Luna Fulgencio as Rosita
- Ava Salazar as Sole
- Jesús Carroza as Esteban
- Fernando Tejero as Editor

== Production ==
Written by Sandra García Nieto, the screenplay is an adaptation of her own novel of the same name. Described by Macarena Astorga as "a thriller that mixes a bit of psychological horror, suspense, mystery and fantasy", The House of Snails is the director's debut feature film. A joint Spanish-Peruvian-Mexican co-production, it was produced by Esto también pasará and Casita Colorá Producciones AIE alongside Bowfinger International Pictures, Basque Films, Producciones Tondero and Hippo Entertainment Group, with the participation of RTVE, Canal Sur, and Amazon Prime Video. It was shot in the mountains of the province of Málaga, including the village of Villanueva de Cauche, belonging to the municipality of Antequera.

== Release ==
The film was presented in the official selection of the 24th Málaga Film Festival on 7 June 2021. Distributed by Filmax, it was theatrically released in Spain on 11 June 2021. It was also invited to the 27th Lima Film Festival in the Galas section, where it will be screened on 12 August 2023.

== Reception ==
Beatriz Martínez of El Periódico de Catalunya rated the film 1 out of 5 stars, writing that "none of the elements of this film make any sense", and the film ends up becoming "an incompetent and arbitrary thriller" attempt.

Irene Crespo of Cinemanía rated the film 3 out of 5 stars underscoring as a verdict the film to be "[an] intense psychological thriller. Magical and rural realism".

Raquel Hernández Luján of HobbyConsolas rated the film with 50 points ("so-so") positively citing the good main actors and the well-done cinematography, whilst negatively assessing the "very poorly directed" secondary actors and the film's overly "abrupt and gimmicky" denouement, otherwise pointing out at the result being a "quite unsatisfactory" film overall.

Elsa Fernández-Santos of El País considered that, despite early managing to unsettle the viewer with the atmosphere and setting, Macarena Astorga "gets totally lost when the secondary characters end up reduced to nothing and the main character leaves the viewer, to say the least, perplexed".

== Accolades ==
| Year | Award | Category | Nominee(s) | Result | Ref. |
|---|---|---|---|---|---|
| 2022 | 1st Carmen Awards | Best Actress | Paz Vega | Nominated | |
| 2022 | 1st Carmen Awards | Best New Director | Macarena Astorga | Nominated | |
| 2022 | 1st Carmen Awards | Best Sound | Diana Sagrista | Nominated | |
| 2022 | 30th Actors and Actresses Union Awards | Best Film Actor in a Minor Role | Fernando Tejero | Nominated | |

== See also ==
- List of Spanish films of 2021
