= The Night of the Sunflowers =

- Theatrical release poster
- Spanish: La noche de los girasoles
- Directed by: Jorge Sánchez-Cabezudo
- Screenplay by: Jorge Sánchez-Cabezudo
- Starring: Carmelo Gómez; Judith Diakhate; Celso Bugallo; Manuel Morón; Mariano Alameda; Vicente Romero; Walter Vidarte; Cesáreo Estébanez
- Cinematography: Ángel Iguácel
- Edited by: Pedro Ribeiro
- Music by: Krishna Levy
- Production companies: Alta Producción; Stop Line Films; The Film SAS; Arte France Cinéma
- Distributed by: Alta Films
- Release dates: 25 August 2006 (Spain); 25 July 2007 (France)
- Countries: Spain; Portugal; France
- Language: Spanish

The Night of the Sunflowers (Spanish: La noche de los girasoles) is a 2006 rural thriller-drama film directed and written by Jorge Sánchez-Cabezudo. The cast features Carmelo Gómez, Judith Diakhate, Celso Bugallo, Manuel Morón, Mariano Alameda, Vicente Romero and Walter Vidarte. It is a Spanish-French-Portuguese co-production.

== Plot ==
Set in the village of Angosto, in the heart of rural Spain, the plot follows Esteban and Pedro (two speleologists) and Gabi (Esteban's girlfriend), as Cecilio, an elderly villager, is killed in the wake of a misunderstanding in the aftermath of the attempted sexual assault on Gabi by a salesman and ensuing violent confrontation.

== Cast ==
- Carmelo Gómez as Esteban
- Judith Diakhate as Gabi
- Celso Bugallo as Amadeo
- Manuel Morón as Miguel
- Mariano Alameda as Pedro
- Vicente Romero as Tomás
- Walter Vidarte as Amós
- Cesáreo Estébanez as Cecilio
- Fernando Sánchez-Cabezudo as Beni
- Petra Martínez as Marta
- Nuria Mencía as Raquel
- Enrique Martínez as Julián

== Production ==
The Night of the Sunflowers is a Spain-Portugal-France co-production. Production companies included Alta Producción, Stop Line Films, The Film SAS and Arte France Cinéma. Locations in the province of Ávila (San Bartolomé de Béjar and Becedas) doubled as the fictional village of Angosto.

== Release ==
Distributed by Alta Films, the film was theatrically released in Spain on 25 August 2006. It also screened at the Venice Days section of the 63rd Venice International Film Festival in September 2006.

== Reception ==
Jonathan Holland of Variety deemed the film to be a "gripping, assured debut", managing to find an "unlikely home for film noir in the forgotten hinterlands of the Spanish interior".

== Accolades ==
Year	Award	Category	Nominee(s)	Result	Ref.
2007	62nd CEC Medals	Best Film		Nominated	
2007	62nd CEC Medals	Best Director	Jorge Sánchez-Cabezudo	Nominated	
2007	62nd CEC Medals	Best Original Screenplay	Jorge Sánchez-Cabezudo	Nominated	
2007	62nd CEC Medals	Best Actor	Carmelo Gómez	Won	
2007	62nd CEC Medals	Best New Artist	Jorge Sánchez-Cabezudo	Won	
2007	62nd CEC Medals	Best Supporting Actor	Celso Bugallo	Nominated	
2007	62nd CEC Medals	Best Cinematography	Ángel Iguácel	Nominated	
2007	62nd CEC Medals	Best Editing	Pablo Ribeiro	Nominated	
2007	21st Goya Awards	Best Original Screenplay	Jorge Sánchez-Cabezudo	Nominated	
2007	21st Goya Awards	Best New Director	Jorge Sánchez-Cabezudo	Nominated	
2007	21st Goya Awards	Best New Actor	Walter Vidarte	Nominated	
2007	16th Actors and Actresses Union Awards	Best Film Actor in a Minor Role	Manuel Morón	Won	
2007	51st Sant Jordi Awards	Best Debut Film		Won	

== See also ==
- List of Spanish films of 2006
- List of French films of 2007
