= The Good Boss =

- Film poster
- Spanish: El buen patrón
- Directed by: Fernando León de Aranoa
- Written by: Fernando León de Aranoa
- Produced by: Fernando León de Aranoa; Jaume Roures; Javier Méndez
- Starring: Javier Bardem; Manolo Solo; Almudena Amor; Óscar de la Fuente; Sonia Almarcha; Fernando Albizu; Tarik Rmili; Rafa Castejón; Celso Bugallo
- Cinematography: Pau Esteve Birba
- Edited by: Vanessa Marimbert
- Music by: Zeltia Montes
- Production companies: Reposado PC; The Mediapro Studio; Básculas Blanco AIE
- Distributed by: Tripictures
- Release dates: 21 September 2021 (Zinemaldia); 15 October 2021 (Spain)
- Running time: 120 minutes
- Country: Spain
- Languages: Spanish; Arabic
- Box office: $7.2 million

The Good Boss (Spanish: El buen patrón) is a 2021 Spanish black comedy-drama film directed and written by Fernando León de Aranoa and starring Javier Bardem. A corporate satire, the plot tracks a charismatic and manipulative factory owner (Bardem) meddling in the lives of his employees.

The film world premiered at the 69th San Sebastián International Film Festival on 21 September 2021, ahead of its 15 October 2021 theatrical release in Spain by Tripictures. It received a record-breaking 20 nominations to the 36th Goya Awards, winning six (Best Picture, Director, Actor, Original Screenplay, Score and Editing).

== Plot ==
Julio Blanco, the charismatic and manipulative owner of a family-run factory of industrial scales in a Spanish provincial town, meddles in the lives of his employees in an attempt to win an award for business excellence.

== Cast ==
- Javier Bardem as Julio Blanco
- Manolo Solo as Miralles
- Almudena Amor as Liliana
- Óscar de la Fuente as José
- Sonia Almarcha as Adela
- Fernando Albizu as Román
- Tarik Rmili as Khaled
- Rafa Castejón as Rubio
- Celso Bugallo as Fortuna
- Francesc Orella as Alejandro
- Martín Páez as Salva
- Yaël Belicha as Inés
- Mara Guil as Aurora
- Nao Albet as Albert
- María de Nati as Ángela
- Dalit Streett Tejeda as José's daughter
- Nicolás Ruiz as José's son
- Daniel Chamorro as the local journalist

== Production ==
The Good Boss was produced by Reposado PC, The Mediapro Studio and Básculas Blanco AIE, with the participation of RTVE, TV3 and Orange. Filming began in Spain in October 2020 and wrapped in December 2020. It was shot in Móstoles and other locations across the Madrid region.

== Release ==
The film premiered at the 69th San Sebastián International Film Festival on 21 September 2021. Distributed by Tripictures, it was then released theatrically in Spain on 15 October 2021. It became the 4th highest-grossing Spanish film release in the domestic market in 2021 with a revenue of 3,278,021 € and 518,254 viewers in the aforementioned year.

Cohen Media Group acquired U.S. rights to the film. Distributed by Bim, it theatrically released in Italy on 23 December 2021 as Il capo perfetto, whereas, distributed by PRIS Audiovisuais, it opened in Portuguese theatres on 20 January 2022 under the title O Bom Patrão. The film was set for a 28 April 2022 opening in Argentine theatres.

The Good Boss was announced as the opening film of the 39th Miami Film Festival (4 March 2022). A 9 June 2022 release date was set for the film's opening in Chilean theatres, distributed by Star Distribution. It had a limited theatrical release in the United States on 26 August 2022, to be followed by a wider release on 2 September.

== Reception ==
=== Critical response ===
On Rotten Tomatoes the film has an 92% rating based on 112 reviews, with an average rating of 7.4/10. The critics consensus reads: "Led by Javier Bardem's charismatic performance and writer-director Fernando León de Aranoa's sharp humor, The Good Boss is a workplace satire worthy of promotion." On Metacritic, the film holds a weighted average score of 63 out of 100, based on 16 critics, indicating "generally favorable reviews".

Guy Lodge of Variety gave the film a positive review and wrote, "Fernando León de Aranoa's corporate satire is too long and languidly paced to pull off its farcical inclinations, but it gets by on its star's magnetism."

Jordan Mintzer of The Hollywood Reporter also gave the film a positive review and wrote, "Slickly entertaining, considering its rather weighty subject matter..."

Javier Zurro of El Español deemed the film to be the best Aranoa film since the 2002 Mondays in the Sun and the best Spanish comedy in (many) years, a genre dominated for some time now by either family comedies or remakes of international titles, generally lacking in original proposals.

Raquel Hernández Luján of HobbyConsolas gave the film 90 out of 100 points, deeming it "excellent", praising the "sharp script", the (actors') direction, and the "careful mise-en-scène".

Quim Casas of El Periódico de Catalunya considered the film to be "a good tragicomedy of social criticism that could well be the counterpart to Mondays in the Sun".

Jonathan Holland of Screen Daily considered the film to be "slickly-made and entertaining, but ultimately a little déjà vu". Plotwise, he deemed the film to be "as smooth and efficient as a well-run factory".

Mirito Torreiro of Fotogramas gave The Good Boss 4 out of 5 stars, highlighting an immense, eminent Javier Bardem in one of his most dazzling performances to date ("he is, quite simply, the movie"), also considering that Aranoa offers viewers a dark comedy displaying a grim portrayal of labour relations.

Reviewing for Cinemanía, Santiago Alverú gave the film 5 out of 5 stars, writing that the political commitment from León de Aranoa and Javier Bardem mixed with the expressive talent of both of them have created a highly entertaining vindication, concluding that "except for Amancio Ortega, the whole of Spain should like it".

The AACCE selected the film as the Spanish entry for the Best International Feature Film at the 94th Academy Awards over Mediterraneo: The Law of the Sea and Parallel Mothers, and it made the 15-film pre-nomination shortlist in December 2021. Ultimately, it was not nominated. It also chose the film as the Spanish submission for Best Ibero-American Film at the 64th Ariel Awards.

=== Accolades ===
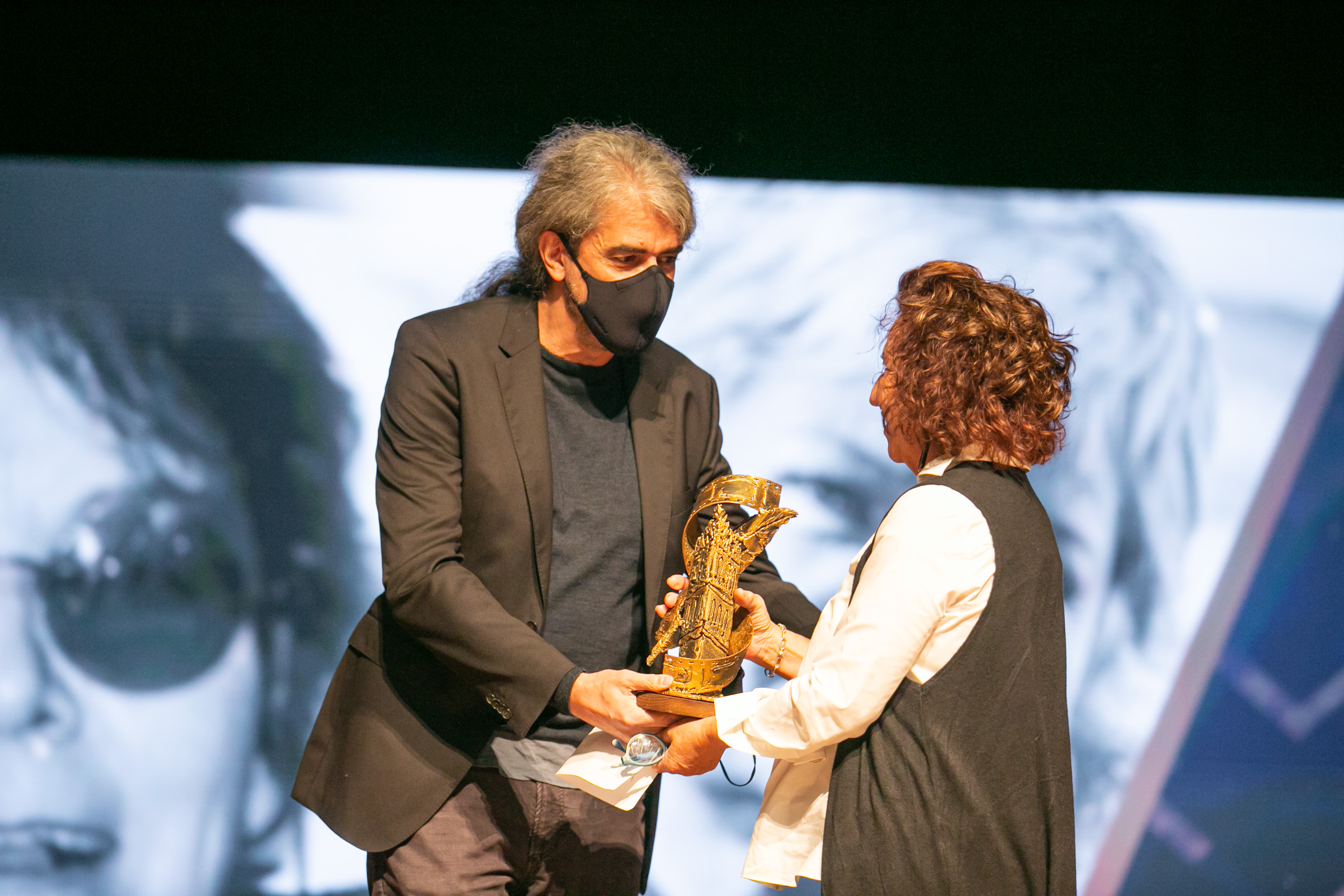
León de Aranoa wins the award for Best Original Screenplay at the 13th CiBRA Festival in Toledo (November 2021)

Year	Award	Category	Nominee(s)	Result	Ref.
2021	13th Festival CiBRA	Best Original Screenplay	Fernando León de Aranoa	Won	
2021	27th Forqué Awards	Best Fiction or Animation Film		Won	
2021	27th Forqué Awards	Best Actor (film)	Javier Bardem	Won	
2022	9th Feroz Awards	Best Comedy Film		Won	
2022	9th Feroz Awards	Best Director	Fernando León de Aranoa	Nominated	
2022	9th Feroz Awards	Best Screenplay	Fernando León de Aranoa	Won	
2022	9th Feroz Awards	Best Actor (film)	Javier Bardem	Won	
2022	9th Feroz Awards	Best Supporting Actress (film)	Almudena Amor	Nominated	
2022	9th Feroz Awards	Best Supporting Actor (film)	Manolo Solo	Nominated	
2022	9th Feroz Awards	Best Supporting Actor (film)	Celso Bugallo	Nominated	
2022	9th Feroz Awards	Best Original Score	Zeltia Montes	Nominated	
2022	9th Feroz Awards	Best Trailer	Maurits Malschaert & Mick Aerts	Nominated	
2022	1st Carmen Awards	Best Supporting Actor	Manolo Solo	Won	
2022	1st Carmen Awards	Best New Actress	Mara Guil	Won	
2022	1st Carmen Awards	Best Cinematography	Pau Esteve	Won	
2022	1st Carmen Awards	Best Costume Design	Fernando García	Nominated	
2022	77th CEC Medals	Best Film		Nominated	
2022	77th CEC Medals	Best Direction	Fernando León de Aranoa	Nominated	
2022	77th CEC Medals	Best Actor	Javier Bardem	Won	
2022	77th CEC Medals	Best Supporting Actor	Manolo Solo	Nominated	
2022	77th CEC Medals	Best Supporting Actor	Celso Bugallo	Nominated	
2022	77th CEC Medals	Best Supporting Actress	Sonia Almarcha	Nominated	
2022	77th CEC Medals	Best New Actor	Óscar de la Fuente	Nominated	
2022	77th CEC Medals	Best New Actor	Tarik Rmili	Nominated	
2022	77th CEC Medals	Best New Actress	Almudena Amor	Won	
2022	77th CEC Medals	Best Original Screenplay	Fernando León de Aranoa	Nominated	
2022	77th CEC Medals	Best Cinematography	Pau Esteve Birba	Nominated	
2022	77th CEC Medals	Best Editing	Vanessa Marimbert	Nominated	
2022	77th CEC Medals	Best Score	Zeltia Montes	Nominated	
2022	36th Goya Awards	Best Film		Won	
2022	36th Goya Awards	Best Director	Fernando León de Aranoa	Won	
2022	36th Goya Awards	Best Actor	Javier Bardem	Won	
2022	36th Goya Awards	Best Supporting Actor	Fernando Albizu	Nominated	
2022	36th Goya Awards	Best Supporting Actor	Celso Bugallo	Nominated	
2022	36th Goya Awards	Best Supporting Actor	Manolo Solo	Nominated	
2022	36th Goya Awards	Best Supporting Actress	Sonia Almarcha	Nominated	
2022	36th Goya Awards	Best New Actor	Óscar de la Fuente	Nominated	
2022	36th Goya Awards	Best New Actor	Tarik Rmili	Nominated	
2022	36th Goya Awards	Best New Actress	Almudena Amor	Nominated	
2022	36th Goya Awards	Best Original Screenplay	Fernando León de Aranoa	Won	
2022	36th Goya Awards	Best Cinematography	Pau Esteve Birba	Nominated	
2022	36th Goya Awards	Best Editing	Vanessa L. Marimbert	Won	
2022	36th Goya Awards	Best Art Direction	Cesar Macarrón	Nominated	
2022	36th Goya Awards	Best Production Supervision	Luis Gutiérrez	Nominated	
2022	36th Goya Awards	Best Sound	Iván Marín, Pelayo Gutiérrez, Valeria Arcieri	Nominated	
2022	36th Goya Awards	Best Special Effects	Raúl Romanillos, Míriam Piquer	Nominated	
2022	36th Goya Awards	Best Costume Design	Fernando García	Nominated	
2022	36th Goya Awards	Best Makeup and Hairstyles	Almudena Fonseca, Manolo García	Nominated	
2022	36th Goya Awards	Best Original Score	Zeltia Montes	Won	
2022	30th Actors and Actresses Union Awards	Best Film Actor in a Leading Role	Javier Bardem	Won	
2022	30th Actors and Actresses Union Awards	Best Film Actor in a Secondary Role	Óscar de la Fuente	Won	
2022	30th Actors and Actresses Union Awards	Best Film Actor in a Secondary Role	Manolo Solo	Nominated	
2022	30th Actors and Actresses Union Awards	Best Film Actress in a Secondary Role	Sonia Almarcha	Won	
2022	30th Actors and Actresses Union Awards	Best Film Actor in a Minor Role	Fernando Albizu	Won	
2022	30th Actors and Actresses Union Awards	Best Film Actress in a Minor Role	Mara Guil	Nominated	
2022	30th Actors and Actresses Union Awards	Best New Actor	Tarik Rmili	Won	
2022	30th Actors and Actresses Union Awards	Best New Actress	Almudena Amor	Won	
2022	26th Satellite Awards	Best Foreign Language Film		Nominated	
2022	Spanish Screenwriters' Union Awards	Best Screenplay in a Comedy Feature Film	Fernando León de Aranoa	Won	
2022	72nd Fotogramas de Plata	Best Spanish Film (according to readers)		Nominated	
2022	72nd Fotogramas de Plata	Best Film Actor	Javier Bardem	Won	
2022	66th Sant Jordi Awards	Best Spanish Actor	Javier Bardem	Won	
2022	9th Platino Awards	Best Ibero-American Film		Won	
2022	9th Platino Awards	Best Director	Fernando León de Aranoa	Won	
2022	9th Platino Awards	Best Screenplay	Fernando León de Aranoa	Won	
2022	9th Platino Awards	Best Original Score	Zeltia Montes	Nominated	
2022	9th Platino Awards	Best Actor	Javier Bardem	Won	
2022	9th Platino Awards	Best Supporting Actress	Almudena Amor	Nominated	
2022	9th Platino Awards	Best Supporting Actor	Manolo Solo	Nominated	
2022	9th Platino Awards	Best Editing	Vanessa Marimbert	Nominated	
2022	9th Platino Awards	Best Cinematography	Pau Esteve	Nominated	
2022	9th Platino Awards	Best Sound	Valeria Arcieri	Nominated	
2022	9th Platino Awards	Best Art Direction	César Macarrón	Nominated	
2022	64th Ariel Awards	Best Ibero-American Film		Won	
2022	35th European Film Awards	Best European Comedy		Won	

== Remake ==
The French remake Un Bon Patron directed by Philippe de Chauveron and starring Didier Bourdon and Catherine Frot is set to be released in November 2026.

== See also ==
- List of Spanish films of 2021
- List of submissions to the 94th Academy Awards for Best International Feature Film
- List of Spanish submissions for the Academy Award for Best International Feature Film
