= Feroz Award for Best Original Soundtrack =

Annual Spanish film award

- Awarded for: Best Original Soundtrack in a Spanish film
- Country: Spain
- Presented by: Asociación de Informadores Cinematográficos de España
- Currently held by: Alberto Iglesias – The Room Next Door (2025)
- Website: http://www.feroz.es/

The Feroz Award for Best Original Soundtrack (Spanish: Premio Feroz a la mejor música original) is one of the annual awards given at the Feroz Awards, presented by the Asociación de Informadores Cinematográficos de España.

It was first presented in 2014. Víctor Reyes was the first recipient of the award for his work in the thriller film Grand Piano.

== Winners and nominees ==
=== 2010s ===
Year	English title	Original title	Recipient(s)
2014	Grand Piano		Víctor Reyes
2014	I'm So Excited	Los amantes pasajeros	Alberto Iglesias
2014	Witching and Bitching	Las brujas de Zugarramundi	Joan Valent
2014	Family United	La gran familia española	Josh Rouse
2014	Living Is Easy with Eyes Closed	Vivir es fácil con los ojos cerrados	Pat Metheny
2015	Marshland	La isla mínima	Julio de la Rosa
2015	Mortadelo and Filemon: Mission Implausible	Mortadelo y Filemón contra Jimmy el Cachondo	Rafael Arnau
2015	El Niño		Roque Baños
2015	Loreak		Pascal Gaigne
2015	La vida inesperada		Lucio Godoy and Federico Jusid
2016	The Bride	La novia	Shigeru Umebayashi
2016	Regression	Regresión	Roque Baños
2016	Spy Time	Anacleto: agente secreto	Javier Rodero
2016	Ma Ma		Alberto Iglesias
2016	Palm Trees in the Snow	Palmeras en la nieve	Lucas Vidal
2017	A Monster Calls		Fernando Velázquez
2017	At Your Doorstep	Cerca de tu casa	Sílvia Pérez Cruz
2017	Smoke & Mirrors	El hombre de las mil caras	Julio de la Rosa
2017	Julieta		Alberto Iglesias
2017	May God Save Us	Que Dios nos perdone	Olivier Arson
2018	Giant	Handia	Pascal Gaigne
2018	The Motive	El autor	José Luis Perales and Pablo Perales
2018	The Bar	El bar	Carlos Riera and Joan Valent
2018	The Bookshop	La librería	Alfonso de Vilallonga
2018	Verónica		Chucky Namanera
2019	Quién te cantará		Alberto Iglesias
2019	The Tree of Blood	El árbol de la sangre	Lucas Vidal
2019	Sunday's Illness	La enfermedad del domingo	Nico Casal
2019	The Realm	El reino	Olivier Arson
2019	Yuli		Alberto Iglesias

=== 2020s ===
Year	English title	Original title	Recipient(s)
2020	Pain and Glory	Dolor y gloria	Alberto Iglesias
2020	Bye	Adiós	Zeltia Montes
2020	Buñuel in the Labyrinth of the Turtles	Buñuel en el laberinto de las tortugas	Arturo Cardelús
2020	The Endless Trench	La trinchera infinita	Pascal Gaigne
2020	While at War	Mientras dure la guerra	Alejandro Amenábar
2020	Advantages of Travelling by Train	Ventajas de viajar en tren	Cristobal Tapia de Veer
2021	Baby		Koldo Uriarte and Bingen Mendizabal
2021	Coven	Akelarre	Maite Arrotajauregi and Aránzazu Calleja
2021	Adú		Roque Baños
2021	My Heart Goes Boom!	Explota Explota	Roque Baños
2021	Cross the Line	No matarás	Federico Jusid and Adrián Foulkes
2022	Parallel Mothers	Madres paralelas	Alberto Iglesias
2022	Love Gets a Room	El amor en su lugar	Víctor Reyes
2022	The Good Boss	El buen patrón	Zeltia Montes
2022	The Daughter	La hija	Vetusta Morla
2022	Maixabel		Alberto Iglesias
2023	The Beasts	As bestas	Olivier Arson
2023	Lullaby	Cinco lobitos	Aránzazu Calleja
2023	God's Crooked Lines	Los renglones torcidos de Dios	Fernando Velázquez
2023	Prison 77	Modelo 77	Julio de la Rosa
2023	One Year, One Night	Un año, una noche	Raül Refree
2024	Robot Dreams		Alfonso de Villalonga
2024	Close Your Eyes	Cerrar los ojos	Federico Jusid
2024	Something Is About to Happen	Que nadie duerma	Zeltia Montes
2024	Society of the Snow	La sociedad de la nieve	Michael Giacchino
2024	Love & Revolution	Te estoy amando locamente	Nico Casal
2025	The Room Next Door	La habitación de al lado	Alberto Iglesias
2025	The 47	El 47	Arnau Bataller
2025	La casa		Fernando Velázquez
2025	They Will Be Dust	Polvo serán	Maria Arnal
2025	Salve Maria		Zeltia Montes
2026	The Captive	El cautivo	Alejandro Amenábar
2026	Daniela Forever		Hidrogenesse (Carlos Ballesteros & Genís Segarra)
2026	Maspalomas		Aránzazu Calleja
2026	Romería		Ernest Pipó
2026	Sirāt		Kangding Ray

== See also ==
- Goya Award for Best Original Score
