= A Dead Man Cannot Live =

- Theatrical release poster
- Spanish: Hombre muerto no sabe vivir
- Directed by: Ezekiel Montes
- Written by: Ezekiel Montes
- Starring: Antonio Dechent; Rubén Ochandiano; Elena Martínez; Jesús Castro; Paco Tous; Nancho Novo; Manuel de Blas
- Cinematography: Ezekiel Montes
- Production companies: 73140323 PC; CineAND Distribución
- Distributed by: Filmax
- Release dates: 8 June 2021 (Málaga); 2 July 2021 (Spain)
- Country: Spain
- Language: Spanish

A Dead Man Cannot Live (Spanish: Hombre muerto no sabe vivir) is a 2021 Spanish action thriller film directed and written by Ezekiel Montes. The cast, led by Antonio Dechent, also features Rubén Ochandiano, Elena Martínez, Jesús Castro, Paco Tous, Nancho Novo and Manuel de Blas.

== Plot ==
The film is set in the Costa del Sol, featuring real-estate corruption as a backdrop. The plot follows Tano, who has worked his entire life for Manuel, a construction magnate who, in better times, controlled the whole city. Tano sees how Manuel can no longer manage the company, and the entire structure is faced with new people, new businesses, a new way of running the company... but the same violence persists. The ways of Ángel, Manuel's son and heir-apparent, complicate things.

== Cast ==
- Antonio Dechent as Tano.
- Rubén Ochandiano as Ángel.
- Elena Martínez as Aitana.
- Jesús Castro as Trujillo.
- Paco Tous as Eduardo.
- Nancho Novo as Paul.
- Manuel de Blas as Manuel.
- Juan Fernández
- Juanma Lara
- Roberto García
- Manolo Caro

== Production ==
A Dead Man Cannot Live is Ezekiel Montes' debut feature film. He took over direction, cinematography, production and script development duties. Filming began in Málaga on 11 November 2019. Other shooting locations also included Marbella and Cádiz. The film was produced by 73140323 PC alongside CineAND Distribución.

== Release ==
The film premiered at the 24th Málaga Film Festival on 8 June 2021. Distributed by Filmax, the film was theatrically released in Spain on 2 July 2021.

== Reception ==
Alberto Luchini of Metrópoli gave the film 2.5 out of 5 stars, considering that despite a number of positive points, such as Dechent's great performance, those of Elena Martínez and Nancho Novo, the well-done atmosphere, the notable cinematography and the staging, the screenplay was "sheer nonsense".

Sergio F. Pinilla of Cinemanía gave the film 3 out of 5 stars, deeming it to be a hyperviolent action thriller with a "colossal cast", and a "somewhat confusing narrative".

Federico Marín Bellón of ABC gave the film, which features "uncomfortable violence", 2 out of 5 stars. He considered that, top-rate cast notwithstanding, a "disjointed choreography of gunpowder" is eventually unleashed in the film, "upon which narrative and editing failures are accentuated".

Carmen L. Lobo of La Razón gave the film 3 out of 5 stars, writing that it is "a wild film with some stereotypes and script weaknesses thrown in but it keeps you gripped throughout".

== Awards and nominations ==
Year	Award	Category	Nominee(s)	Result	Ref.
2022	1st Carmen Awards	Best Actor	Antonio Dechent	Won	
2022	1st Carmen Awards	Best Original Song	Chelo Soto	Nominated	
2022	1st Carmen Awards	Best New Director	Ezekiel Montes	Nominated	
2022	1st Carmen Awards	Best Special Effects	Eduardo Pérez, Juan Ventura, Víctor Alcalá	Won	
2022	1st Carmen Awards	Best New Actress	Elena Martínez	Nominated	
2022	1st Carmen Awards	Best Editing	José. M. G. Moyano	Nominated	
2022	1st Carmen Awards	Best Cinematography	Ezekiel Montes	Nominated	
2022	1st Carmen Awards	Best Supporting Actor	Paco Tous	Nominated	

== See also ==
- List of Spanish films of 2021
