= Javier Gutiérrez (actor) =

Spanish actor

- (2023)
- Born: Javier Gutiérrez Álvarez; 17 January 1971 (age 55); Luanco, Spain
- Occupation: Actor

Javier Gutiérrez Álvarez (born 17 January 1971) is a Spanish actor. After his 2002 acting debut in cinema, he developed an early career primarily in comedy films, likewise earning much popularity for his sidekick role as Satur in swashbuckler television series Águila Roja. His performance in 2014 crime thriller Marshland earned him wide acclaim and recognition. He has since starred in films such as The Motive, Champions, The Daughter and Prison 77 and television series such as Estoy vivo and Vergüenza. He has earned numerous accolades, including two Goya awards for Best Actor.

== Biography ==
Javier Gutiérrez Álvarez was born in the Asturian parish of Luanco on 17 January 1971. His mother was from the likewise Asturian municipality of Belmonte de Miranda. When he was barely one year old, he moved with his parents to Ferrol, Galicia, where he was raised.

Seeking to develop a career as a stage actor, Gutiérrez moved from Galicia to Madrid at age 19. He appeared in stage plays such as La tinaja (1993) and La cabeza del dragón (1994), with Jesús Salgado as theatre director. He joined the Animalario theatre group. He had his debut in television in 2000, whereas his debut in a feature film came with his performance in the 2002 musical comedy The Other Side of the Bed, directed by Emilio Martínez Lázaro.

Gutiérrez became very popular to a television audience in Spain for his work in adventure series Águila Roja (2009–2016), portraying Satur (the squire of the protagonist). The role has been highlighted as the most charismatic character of his career.

He portrayed Falconetti in Zip & Zap and the Marble Gang (2013). He portrayed Tomás de Torquemada in Assassin's Creed (2016). He first declined it because he was filming The Olive Tree, by Icíar Bollaín, but then he was convinced by the director Justin Kurzel in a Skype call. He portrayed the fictional character Sergeant Jimeno Costa in 1898: Los últimos de Filipinas (2016). He portrayed Álvaro in The Motive (2017), for which he received the Goya Award for Best Actor.

== Filmography ==
=== Film ===
Key
†	Denotes films that have not yet been released

Year	Title	Role	Notes	Ref.
2002	El otro lado de la cama (The Other Side of the Bed)	Fernando	Feature film debut	
2004	El asombroso mundo de Borjamari y Pocholo (The Amazing World of Borjamari and Pocholo)	Pocholo		
2004	Crimen ferpecto (Ferpect Crime)	Jaime		
2005	El penalti más largo del mundo (The Longest Penalty Shot in the World)	Rafa		
2005	Torrente 3: El protector	Solís		
2006	Un franco, 14 pesetas (Crossing the Border)	Marcos		
2007	Días de cine (Cinema Days)	Benito Magallanes		
2007	Blinkers (Salir pitando)	Rafa		
2007	Santos	Santos Salvador		
2008	Gente de mala calidad			
2009	Al final del camino (Road to Santiago)	José		
2011	Águila Roja: la película (Red Eagle, the Movie)	Satur	Reprise of role in TV series Águila Roja	
2011	No lo llames amor... llámalo X (Don't Call It Love… Call It XXX)	Joserra		
2013	A Night in Old Mexico			
2013	Zipi y Zape y el club de la canica (Zip & Zap and the Marble Gang)	Falconetti		
2013	Gente en sitios (People in Places)			
2014	Isla mínima (Marshland)	Juan		
2014	2 francos, 40 pesetas (2 Francs, 40 Pesetas)	Marcos	Reprise of role in Un franco, 14 pesetas	
2014	Historias de Lavapiés			
2015	Plan de fuga (Getaway Plan)	Rápido		
2015	Truman	Asesor funerario		
2015	El desconocido (Retribution)	El Desconocido		
2016	1898, los últimos de Filipinas (1898, Our Last Men in the Philippines)	Sargento Jimeno		
2016	El olivo (The Olive Tree)	Alcachofa		
2016	Assassin's Creed	Tomas de Torquemada		
2017	El autor (The Motive)	Álvaro		
2018	Campeones (Champions)	Marco Montes		
2018	Durante la tormenta (Mirage)	Ángel Prieto		
2020	Hogar (The Occupant)	Javier Muñoz		
2021	Bajocero (Below Zero)	Martín		
2021	La hija (The Daughter)	Javier		
2022	Modelo 77 (Prison 77)	José Pino		
2022	Mañana es hoy (Tomorrow Is Today)	José Luis		
2023	Lobo feroz	Alonso		
2023	Honeymoon	Carlos		
2024	Pájaros (Birds Flying East)	Colombo		
2024	Estación Rocafort (Last Stop: Rocafort St.)	Román		
2025	Rondallas (Band Together)	Luis		
2026	53 domingos (53 Sundays)	Víctor		
TBA	El profesor †	Carlos		

=== Television ===
Year	Title	Role	Notes	Ref.)
2007	La habitación del niño (The Baby's Room)	Juan	TV movie part of the Películas para no dormir series	
2009–16	Águila Roja (Red Eagle)	Sátur		
2016	Lo que escondían sus ojos	Francisco Franco	Miniseries	
2017–	Estoy vivo	Manuel Márquez		
2018–20	Vergüenza	Jesús Gutiérrez		
2021	Reyes de la noche	Francisco Javier Maldonado, "Paco el Cóndor"		
2025	La vida breve	Felipe V		

== Accolades ==
Year	Award	Category	Work	Result	Ref.
2012	21st Actors and Actresses Union Awards	Best Television Actor in a Leading Role	Red Eagle	Won	
2015	2nd Feroz Awards	Best Actor	Marshland	Won	
2015	70th CEC Medals	Best Actor	Marshland	Won	
2015	29th Goya Awards	Best Actor	Marshland	Won	
2015	24th Actors and Actresses Union Awards	Best Film Actor in a Leading Role	Marshland	Won	
2015	2nd Platino Awards	Best Actor	Marshland	Nominated	
2015	2nd Fénix Awards	Best Actor	Marshland	Nominated	
2016	3rd Feroz Awards	Best Supporting Actor	Retribution	Nominated	
2017	72nd CEC Medals	Best Supporting Actor	The Olive Tree	Nominated	
2017	31st Goya Awards	Best Supporting Actor	The Olive Tree	Nominated	
2018	5th Feroz Awards	Best Main Actor in a Series	Vergüenza	Won	
2018	5th Feroz Awards	Best Main Actor in a Film	The Motive	Won	
2018	73rd CEC Awards	Best Actor	The Motive	Won	
2018	32nd Goya Awards	Best Actor	The Motive	Won	
2018	27th Actors and Actresses Union Awards	Best Film Actor in a Leading Role	The Motive	Won	
2018	5th Platino Awards	Best Actor	The Motive	Nominated	
2019	6th Feroz Awards	Best Main Actor in a Series	Vergüenza	Nominated	
2019	6th Feroz Awards	Best Main Actor in a Film	Champions	Nominated	
2019	74th CEC Awards	Best Actor	Champions	Nominated	
2019	33rd Goya Awards	Best Actor	Champions	Nominated	
2019	28th Actors and Actresses Union Awards	Best Television Actor in a Leading Role	Estoy vivo	Nominated	
2019	6th Platino Awards	Best Actor	Champions	Nominated	
2020	29th Actors and Actresses Union Awards	Best Television Actor in a Leading Role	Estoy vivo	Nominated	
2021	8th Feroz Awards	Best Main Actor in a Film	The Occupant	Nominated	
2021	76th CEC Medals	Best Actor	The Occupant	Nominated	
2022	9th Feroz Awards	Best Main Actor in a Series	Reyes de la noche	Nominated	
2022	77th CEC Medals	Best Actor	The Daughter	Nominated	
2022	36th Goya Awards	Best Actor	The Daughter	Nominated	
2022	30th Actors and Actresses Union Awards	Best Film Actor in a Leading Role	The Daughter	Nominated	
2023	37th Goya Awards	Best Actor	Prison 77	Nominated	
2023	31st Actors and Actresses Union Awards	Best Film Actor in a Leading Role	Prison 77	Nominated	
2025	12th Feroz Awards	Best Supporting Actor in a Series	The Asunta Case	Nominated	
2025	33rd Actors and Actresses Union Awards	Best Television Actor in a Secondary Role	The Asunta Case	Nominated	
