= Lemon and Poppy Seed Cake =

- Theatrical release poster
- Spanish: Pan de limón con semillas de amapola
- Directed by: Benito Zambrano
- Written by: Benito Zambrano; Cristina Campos
- Based on: Pan de limón con semillas de amapola by Cristina Campos
- Starring: Elia Galera; Eva Martín; Claudia Faci; Marilú Marini; Tommy Schlesser; Pere Arquillué; Ana Gracia
- Production companies: Filmax; Deal Productions; La Periférica Produccions
- Distributed by: Filmax
- Release dates: 24 October 2021 (Seminci); 12 November 2021 (Spain)
- Countries: Spain; Luxembourg

Lemon and Poppy Seed Cake (Spanish: Pan de limón con semillas de amapola) is a 2021 Spanish-Luxembourgish film directed by Benito Zambrano, based on the novel of the same name.

== Plot ==
The plot follows Anna and Marina, two sisters who set up a bakery in Majorca together.

== Cast ==
- Elia Galera as Marina
- Eva Martín as Anna
- Mariona Pagès
- Marilú Marini
- Tommy Schlesser
- Claudia Faci
- Pere Arquillué
- Ana Gracia as sor Teresa

== Production ==
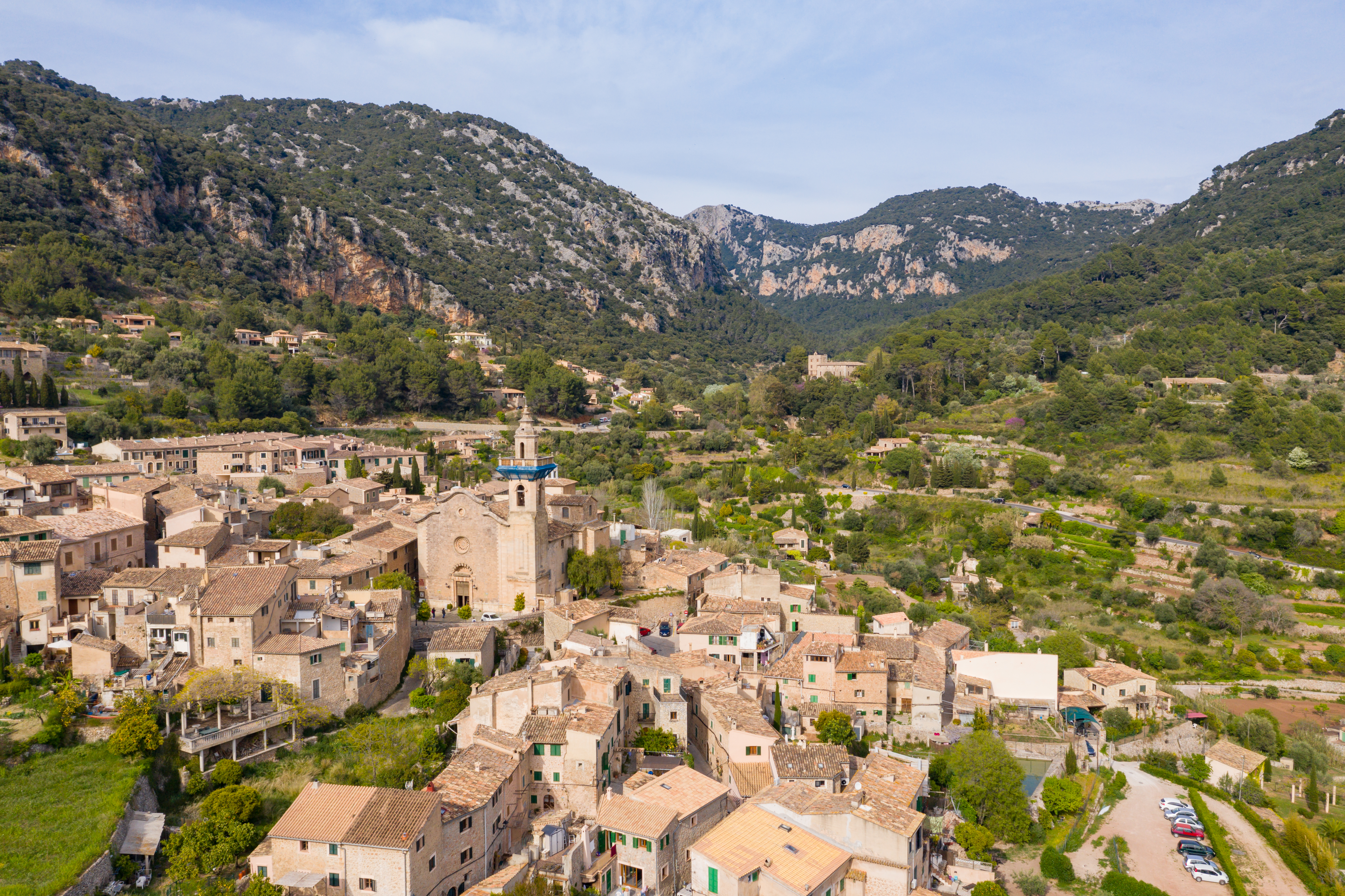
Valldemosa was a prime shooting location

Lemon and Poppy Seed Cake is based on the novel of the same name by Cristina Campos. The film was produced by Filmax alongside Deal Productions and La Periférica Produccions, with the participation of RTVE, Movistar+ and TVC and support from the ICAA and the Luxembourg Film Fund.

It was primarily shot in Valldemosa (island of Mallorca), but footage was also shot in locations of the island of Gran Canaria, including Guía, Firgas, Arucas and Fataga.

== Release ==
The film had its world premiere at the 66th Valladolid Film Festival (Seminci) on 24 October 2021 (2nd day). It also screened at the Seville European Film Festival (SEFF) and the Evolution Mallorca International Film Festival (EMIFF) . Distributed by Filmax, the film was theatrically released in Spain on 12 November 2021.

== Awards and nominations ==
Year	Award	Category	Nominee(s)	Result	Ref.
2022	1st Carmen Awards	Best Director	Benito Zambrano	Nominated	
2022	1st Carmen Awards	Best Screenplay	Benito Zambrano	Nominated	
2022	77th CEC Medals	Best Adapted Screenplay	Benito Zambrano	Nominated	
2022	36th Goya Awards	Best Adapted Screenplay	Benito Zambrano, Cristina Campos	Nominated	

== See also ==
- List of Spanish films of 2021
