= The Daughter (2021 film) =

- Theatrical release poster
- Spanish: La hija
- Directed by: Manuel Martín Cuenca
- Screenplay by: Manuel Martín Cuenca; Alejandro Hernández
- Based on: an original story by Félix Vidal
- Starring: Javier Gutiérrez; Patricia López Arnaiz; Irene Virgüez Filippidis
- Cinematography: Marc Gómez del Moral
- Edited by: Ángel Hernández Zoido
- Music by: Vetusta Morla
- Production companies: MOD Producciones; La Loma Blanca PC; La Hija Producciones La Película AIE
- Distributed by: Caramel Films
- Release dates: 13 September 2021 (TIFF); 26 November 2021 (Spain)
- Country: Spain
- Language: Spanish

The Daughter (Spanish: La hija) is a 2021 Spanish thriller drama film directed by Manuel Martín Cuenca, which stars Javier Gutiérrez, Patricia López Arnaiz and Irene Virgüez.

== Plot ==
Irene is a teenage girl living in a youth detention center who has just got pregnant. She is offered to live with Javier and Adela (a couple desperate to have a child) in a remote house in the mountains in exchange for the baby.

== Cast ==
- Javier Gutiérrez as Javier
- Patricia López Arnaiz as Adela
- Irene Virgüez as Irene

== Production ==
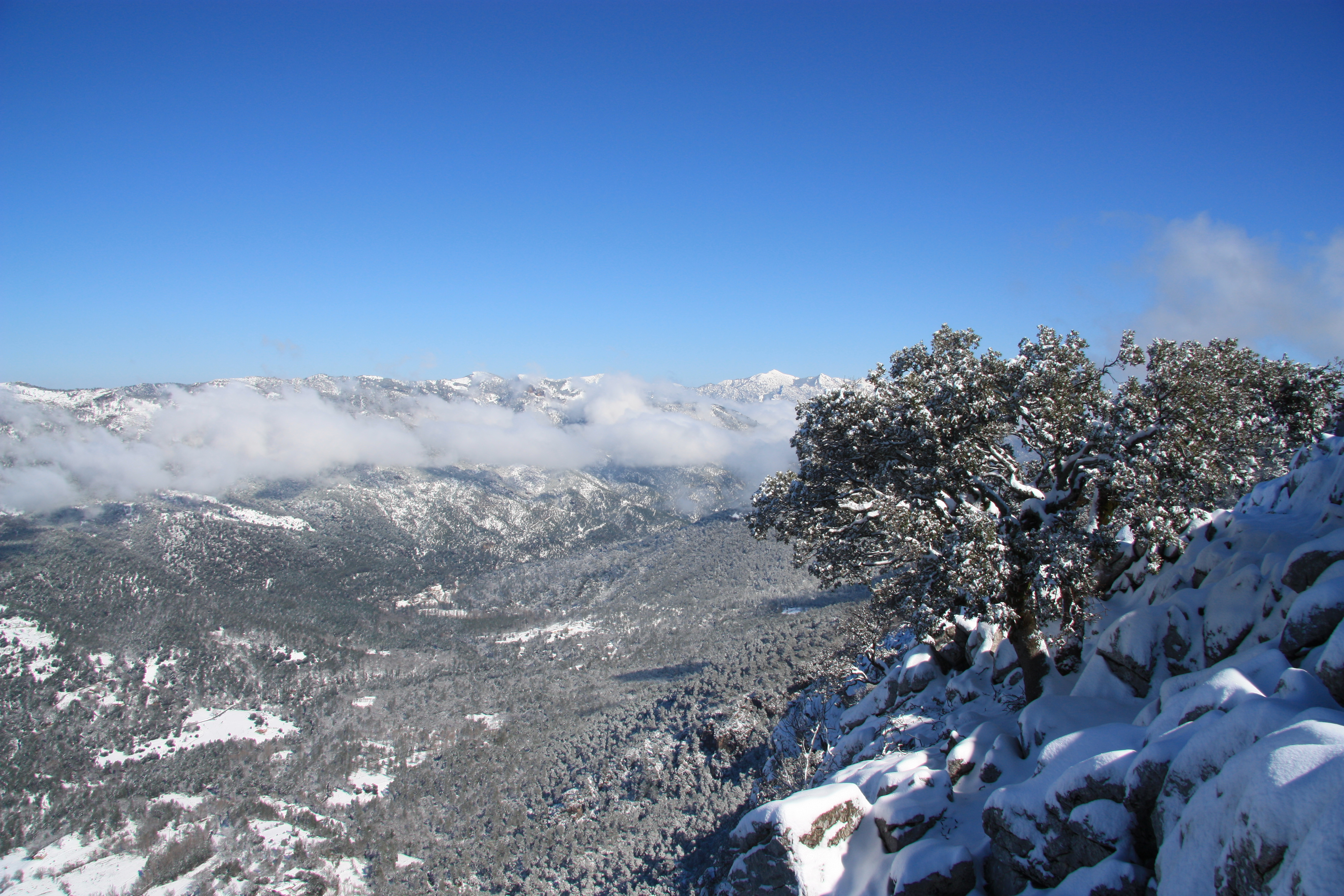
The film was shot in landscapes of the Sierras de Cazorla, Segura y Las Villas Natural Park

The Daughter was written by Manuel Martín Cuenca and Alejandro Hernández based on a "horror-oriented" original story by Félix Vidal.

The film was produced by MOD Producciones, La Loma Blanca PC, and La Hija Producciones La Película AIE, with the participation of RTVE, Canal Sur Radio y Televisión and Movistar+, funding from the ICAA and Arcano Financiación Audiovisual, support from A.A.II.CC. and the sponsoring of the Diputación Provincial de Jaén. The score was composed and performed by Vetusta Morla.

Fully shot in the province of Jaén, filming locations included the provincial capital (Jaén) as well as the Sierras de Cazorla, Segura y Las Villas Natural Park. The fictional couple's house in the mountains was located in the so-called Llanos del Peral.

== Release ==
The film had its world premiere at the 46th Toronto International Film Festival (TIFF) on 13 September 2021. It also screened at the 69th San Sebastián International Film Festival later in the month. Distributed by Caramel Films, the film was theatrically released in Spain on 26 November 2021.

== Reception ==
According to the review aggregation website Rotten Tomatoes, The Daughter has a 100% approval rating based on 8 reviews from critics, with an average rating of 7.70/10.

Janire Zurbano of Cinemanía gave the film 3 out of 5 stars, considering that while lacking the rhythm and plot-turns of other Martín Cuenca's films such as Cannibal and The Motive, the almost theatrical mise-en-scène and the visual power of the landscapes put tension and pressure on the viewers; cornering them to identify with the protagonists.

Beatriz Martínez of Fotogramas gave the film 5 out of 5 stars, considering the film a masterpiece of contemporary Spanish cinema, a film "as shocking as it is memorable, as a macabre fable".

Raquel Hernández Luján of HobbyConsolas gave the film 60 out of 100 points, considering that—despite praising the exquisite cinematography, the composition of the shots, the score and the performances of the adults—it was a "slow, predictable and boring" film and that the child actress' performance was subpar.

Quim Casas of El Periódico de Catalunya gave the film 3 out of 5 stars, considering that the "elegant and austere" filmmaking plays well on its setting and the reduced number of characters.

Jonathan Holland of ScreenDaily wrote that the film "is gripping, and the script generally keeps one step ahead".

== Awards and nominations ==
Year	Award	Category	Nominee(s)	Result	Ref.
2021	34th ASECAN Awards	Best Film		Won	
2021	34th ASECAN Awards	Best Director	Manuel Martín Cuenca	Won	
2021	34th ASECAN Awards	Best Screenplay	Manuel Martín Cuenca, Alejandro Hernández	Won	
2022	9th Feroz Awards	Best Original Score	Vetusta Morla	Nominated	
2022	1st Carmen Awards	Best Fiction Feature Film	La Loma Blanca PC	Won	
2022	1st Carmen Awards	Best Direction	Manuel Martín Cuenca	Won	
2022	1st Carmen Awards	Best Screenplay	Alejandro Hernández, Manuel Martín Cuenca	Won	
2022	1st Carmen Awards	Best Production Supervision	Ernesto Chao	Nominated	
2022	1st Carmen Awards	Best Makeup and Hairstyles	Yolanda Piña	Won	
2022	1st Carmen Awards	Best Supporting Actor	Juan Carlos Villanueva	Nominated	
2022	77th CEC Medals	Best Director	Manuel Martín Cuenca	Nominated	
2022	77th CEC Medals	Best Actor	Javier Gutiérrez	Nominated	
2022	36th Goya Awards	Best Director	Manuel Martín Cuenca	Nominated	
2022	36th Goya Awards	Best Actor	Javier Gutiérrez	Nominated	
2022	30th Actors and Actresses Union Awards	Best Film Actor in a Leading Role	Javier Gutiérrez	Nominated	

== See also ==
- List of Spanish films of 2021
