= Innocent Killers =

- Theatrical release poster
- Spanish: Asesinos inocentes
- Directed by: Gonzalo Bendala
- Written by: Gonzalo Bendala; J.M. Asensio
- Produced by: Marta Velasco
- Starring: Miguel Ángel Solá; Maxi Iglesias; Aura Garrido; Luis Fernández; Javier Hernández; Alvar Gordejuela; Vicente Romero; Manolo Solo
- Cinematography: Álvaro Gutiérrez
- Edited by: Antonio Frutos
- Music by: Pablo Cervantes
- Production companies: Áralan Films; Asesinos inocentes AIE
- Distributed by: Filmax
- Release dates: 10 March 2015 (Miami); 3 July 2015 (Spain)
- Country: Spain
- Language: Spanish

Innocent Killers (Spanish: Asesinos inocentes) is a 2015 Spanish black comedy thriller film directed by Gonzalo Bendala starring Miguel Ángel Solá and Maxi Iglesias.

== Plot ==
University student Francisco Garralda, in a dire financial plight, is offered to kill his psychology professor Sebastián Espinosa for money by no other than the professor himself.

== Cast ==
- Maxi Iglesias as Francisco Garralda
- Miguel Ángel Solá as Sebastián Espinosa
- Aura Garrido as Nuria Abreu
- Luis Fernández as Andrés Nogales
- Javier Hernández as Manuel Ballesteros
- Alvar Gordejuela as Rafael Sánchez

== Production ==
The film is an Áralan Films and Asesinos inocentes AIE production, with backing from TVE, Canal Sur, ICAA, Junta de Andalucía, Patrilab, and Genial Media. Shooting locations included Seville.

== Release ==
The film world premiered at the Miami International Film Festival on 10 March 2015. It also made it to the main competition slate of the 18th Málaga Film Festival. Distributed by Filmax, it was released theatrically in Spain on 3 July 2015.

== Reception ==
Carlos Marañón of Cinemanía rated the film 1½ out of 5 stars, declaring it "college thriller that sells its soul in search of a passing grade" in the verdict.

Pere Vall of Fotogramas rated the film 3 out of 5 stars, welcoming that it is "not afraid to compress all the topics of the genre and try to make them dialogue and fight each other".

== See also ==
- List of Spanish films of 2015
