= The Motive (film) =

- Spanish release poster
- Spanish: El autor
- Directed by: Manuel Martín Cuenca
- Written by: Manuel Martín Cuenca Alejandro Hernández
- Produced by: Mónica Lozano; Gonzalo Salazar-Simpson; David Naranjo; Manuel Martín Cuenca
- Starring: Javier Gutiérrez; María León; Antonio de la Torre; Adriana Paz; Tenoch Huerta; Adelfa Calvo; José Carlos Carmona
- Cinematography: Pau Esteve
- Edited by: Ángel Hernández Zoido
- Music by: José Luis Perales; Pablo Perales Carrasco
- Production companies: Icónica Producciones; Lazona Films; La Loma Blanca PC
- Release dates: 9 September 2017 (Toronto); 17 November 2017 (Spain)
- Running time: 112 minutes
- Countries: Spain; Mexico
- Languages: Spanish; English

The Motive (Spanish: El autor, lit. 'The author') is a 2017 Spanish-Mexican drama film directed by Manuel Martín Cuenca, from a screenplay by Alejandro Hernández and Martín Cuenca. It stars Javier Gutiérrez, María León and Antonio de la Torre.

The film premiered at the 2017 Toronto International Film Festival.

== Plot ==
Álvaro separates from his wife Amanda, an elated best-seller writer, and motivated by her success, makes up his mind to write a great novel. Problem is, he lacks talent and imagination. He figures out that great fiction is drawn from reality, and he begins to manipulate his neighbors and to get involved in their lives in order to find inspiration for his writing.

== Cast ==
- Javier Gutiérrez as Álvaro
- María León as Amanda
- Adelfa Calvo as Portera (caretaker)
- Adriana Paz as Irene
- Tenoch Huerta as Enrique
- Rafael Téllez as Sr. Montero
- Antonio de la Torre as Juan
- Domi del Postigo as Presentador (presenter)
- José Carlos Carmona as Jesús
- Alberto González as Don Alfonso

== Reception ==
=== Critical reception ===
On review aggregator website Rotten Tomatoes, the film holds an approval rating of 60%, based on 20 reviews, and an average rating of 6.8/10.

=== Accolades ===
Year	Award	Category	Nominee(s)	Result	Ref.
2018	23rd Forqué Awards	Best Film		Won	
2018	23rd Forqué Awards	Best Actor	Javier Gutiérrez	Won	
2018	23rd Forqué Awards	Best Actress	Adelfa Calvo	Nominated	
2018	5th Feroz Awards	Best Drama		Nominated	
2018	5th Feroz Awards	Best Director	Manuel Martín Cuenca	Nominated	
2018	5th Feroz Awards	Best Screenplay	Alejandro Hernández, Manuel Martín Cuenca	Nominated	
2018	5th Feroz Awards	Best Actor in a Film	Javier Gutiérrez	Won	
2018	5th Feroz Awards	Best Supporting Actress in a Film	Adelfa Calvo	Won	
2018	5th Feroz Awards	Best Supporting Actor in a Film	Antonio de la Torre	Nominated	
2018	5th Feroz Awards	Best Original Soundtrack	José Luis Perales, Pablo Perales	Nominated	
2018	5th Feroz Awards	Best Trailer	Fernando Vallarino	Nominated	
2018	32nd Goya Awards	Best Film		Nominated	
2018	32nd Goya Awards	Best Director	Manuel Martín Cuenca	Nominated	
2018	32nd Goya Awards	Best Adapted Screenplay	Alejandro Hernández, Manuel Martín Cuenca	Nominated	
2018	32nd Goya Awards	Best Actor	Javier Gutiérrez	Won	
2018	32nd Goya Awards	Best Supporting Actress	Adelfa Calvo	Won	
2018	32nd Goya Awards	Best Supporting Actor	Antonio de la Torre	Nominated	
2018	32nd Goya Awards	Best New Actress	Adriana Paz	Nominated	
2018	32nd Goya Awards	Best Sound	Daniel de Zayas, Pelayo Gutiérrez, Alberto Ovejero	Nominated	
2018	32nd Goya Awards	Best Original Song	"Algunas veces" by José Luis Perales	Nominated	
2018	27th Actors and Actresses Union Awards	Best Film Actor in a Leading Role	Javier Gutiérrez	Won	
2018	27th Actors and Actresses Union Awards	Best Film Actress in a Secondary Role	Adelfa Calvo	Won	
2018	27th Actors and Actresses Union Awards	Best Film Actor in a Secondary Role	Antonio de la Torre	Nominated	
2018	5th Platino Awards	Best Actor	Javier Gutiérrez	Nominated	

== Trivia ==
Some of the "penguins scene" from Werner Herzog's Encounters at the End of the World is featured in the first scene.

== See also ==
- List of Spanish films of 2017
