= Pau Esteve Birba =

Spanish cinematographer

Pau Esteve Birba (born 1981) is a Spanish cinematographer.

== Biography ==
Pau Esteve Birba was born in Barcelona in 1981. He graduated in photography from the ESCAC. Following his graduation he decided to move to Mexico in 2009. He was recalled to Spain to work in the second unit of Buried. He settled in Málaga towards 2017.

== Filmography ==
Cinematographer

- Cannibal (2013)
- Beautiful Youth (2014)
- It's Now or Never (2015)
- Realive (2016)
- Orbiter 9 (2017)
- The Motive (2017)
- Some Time Later (2018)
- Bye (2019)
- Out in the Open (2019)
- The Good Boss (2021)
- Alegría (2021)

== Accolades ==
Year	Award	Category	Work	Result	Ref.
2013	61st San Sebastián International Film Festival	Best Cinematography	Cannibal	Won	
2014	28th Goya Awards	Best Cinematography	Cannibal	Won	
2014	1st Fénix Awards	Best Cinematography	Cannibal	Nominated	
2015	7th Gaudí Awards	Best Cinematography	Beautiful Youth	Nominated	
2022	1st Carmen Awards	Best Cinematography	The Good Boss	Won	
2022	1st Carmen Awards	Best Cinematography	Alegría	Nominated	
2022	36th Goya Awards	Best Cinematography	The Good Boss	Nominated	
2022	9th Platino Awards	Best Cinematography	The Good Boss	Nominated	
