= Niña de Antequera =

- Born: María Barruz Martínez; 1 March 1920
- Origin: Málaga
- Died: August 28, 1972 (aged 52) Sevilla
- Genres: Flamenco
- Occupation: Composer
- Instrument: Voice

Niña de Antequera (María Barruz Martínez, 1 March 1921 – 28 August 1972) was a Spanish flamenco singer.

== Career ==
Niña de Antequera began her career in flamenco in Jaén when she was 12 years old.

She became a popular artist beginning in the 1940s in Seville, where she performed with El Niño de la Huerta, Nina de la Puebla, Pepe Pinto, Pepe Marchena, Enrique Montoya, Porrina de Badajoz, Rafael Farina, Antonio Molina and Juanito Valderrama.

She died following a traffic accident in Sevilla in 1972.

== Discography ==
- Doña Omar
- ¡Ay, mi perro!
- Llegó el florero
