= Manuel Martín Cuenca =

Spanish film director

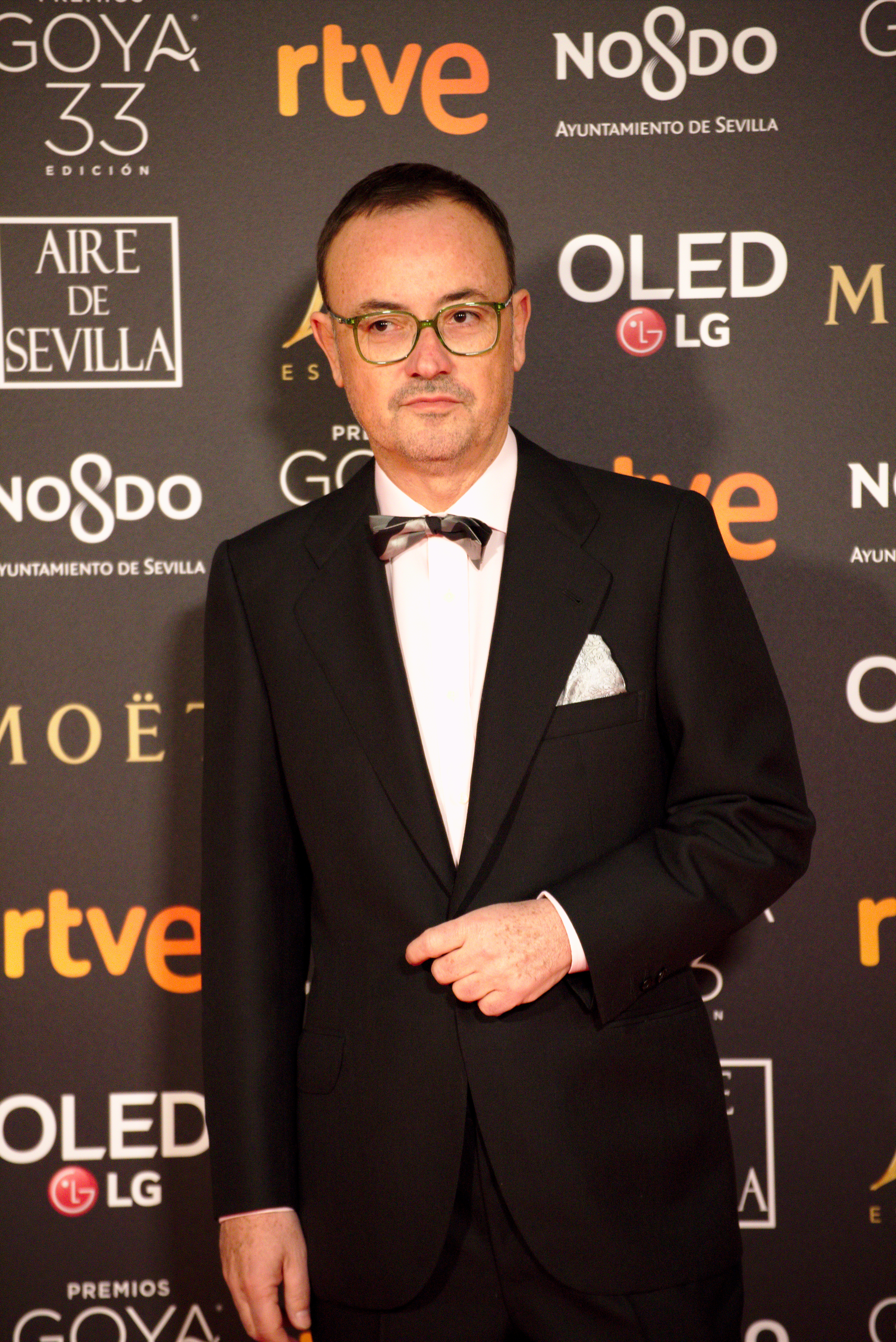
- Goya in 2019
- Born: 30 November 1964 (age 60); El Ejido, Spain
- Occupation(s): Film director, screenwriter

Manuel Martín Cuenca (born 30 November 1964) is a Spanish film director. He directed more than ten films since 1990.

== Selected filmography ==
- The Weakness of the Bolshevik (2003)
- Hard Times (2005)
- Half of Oscar (2010)
- Cannibal (2013)
- The Motive (2017)
- The Daughter (2021)
- Andrea's Love (2023)

== Awards ==
| Year | Category | Work | Result | Ref. |
|---|---|---|---|---|
| 2017 | Goya Award for Best Director | El autor | Nominated | |
| 2017 | Goya Award for Best Adapted Screenplay | El autor | Nominated | |
| 2022 | Goya Award for Best Director | La hija | Nominated | |
