= Teatro Cervantes (Málaga) =

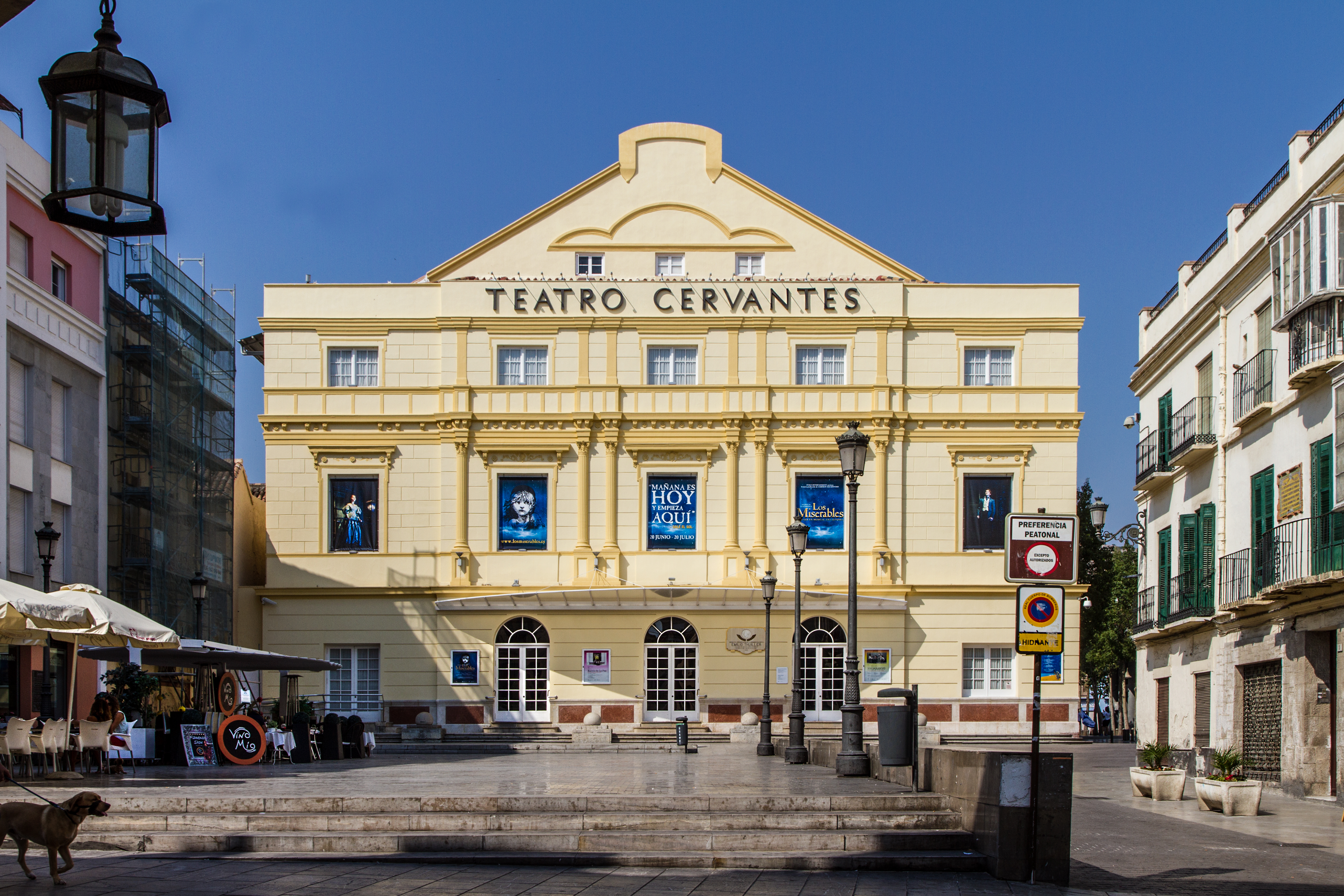
- Interactive map of Teatro Cervantes
- Address: Calle Ramos Marín; Málaga, Andalusia, Spain
- Coordinates: 36.72474°N 4.41858°W
- Owner: Ayuntamiento de Málaga

Construction
- Opened: 17 December 1870
- Architect: Gerónimo Cuervo

Spanish Cultural Heritage
- Type: Non-movable
- Criteria: Monument
- Designated: 2005
- Reference no.: RI-53-0011534-00000

The Teatro Cervantes is a multi-arts venue in Málaga, Spain.

The project was authored by Gerónimo Cuervo. It opened on 17 December 1870. It became a municipal property in 1998, subsequently becoming the main venue of the Málaga Film Festival. In 2005, it received the status of Bien de Interés Cultural. It also serves as venue for the Málaga Theatre Festival. The Málaga Philharmonic Orchestra regularly plays at the venue.
