= Niña de la Puebla =

Flamenco and Andalusian singer

La Niña de la Puebla
- Also known as: Niña de la Puebla
- Born: Dolores Jiménez Alcántara; July 28, 1908; La Puebla de Cazalla, Seville, Spain
- Died: June 14, 1999 (aged 90) Málaga, Spain
- Genres: Flamenco, Andalusian copla
- Occupation: Singer
- Years active: 1931–1990s
- Spouse: Lucas Soto Martín (m. 1934)

Dolores Jiménez Alcántara (28 July 1908, in La Puebla de Cazalla, Seville – 14 June 1999, Málaga), known as "La Niña de la Puebla "(in Spanish: "The girl from La Puebla"; La Puebla is her birthplace) was one of the greatest flamenco and Andalusian copla singers.

Jimenez was born on 28 July 1908, the daughter of a barber. An eye infection at a young age resulted in blindness. At age 8 she moved with her family to Madrid and began music lessons and studied flamenco.

In 1931 Jimenez debuted in Seville. Her style was known as dulce, or sweet. She married another singer in 1934, Lucas Soto Martin, and had five children, two of whom became flamenco professionals.
