= Adelfa Calvo =

Spanish actress

- Calvo in 2026
- Born: Adelfa Calvo Soto; 5 April 1962 (age 64); Melilla, Spain
- Occupation: Actress
- Relatives: La Niña de la Puebla (grandmother)

Adelfa Calvo Soto (born 5 April 1962) is a Spanish actress.

== Biography ==
Born on 5 April 1962 in Melilla, Adelfa Calvo Soto moved when she was barely months old to Málaga, where she was largely raised, together with Seville. She is the daughter of cantaora Adelfa Soto and the grand daughter of La Niña de la Puebla.

She won the Goya Award for Best Supporting Actress for her performance in The Motive.

== Accolades ==
Year	Award	Category	Work	Result	Ref.
2018	23rd Forqué Awards	Best Actress	The Motive	Nominated	
2018	5th Feroz Awards	Best Supporting Actress in a Film	The Motive	Won	
2018	73rd CEC Awards	Best Supporting Actress	The Motive	Nominated	
2018	32nd Goya Awards	Best Supporting Actress	The Motive	Won	
2018	27th Actors and Actresses Union Awards	Best Film Actress in a Secondary Role	The Motive	Won	
2023	10th Feroz Awards	Best Supporting Actress in a Film	On the Fringe	Nominated	
2025	4th Carmen Awards	Best Supporting Actress	May I Speak with the Enemy?	Won	
