= Petra Martínez =

Spanish actress

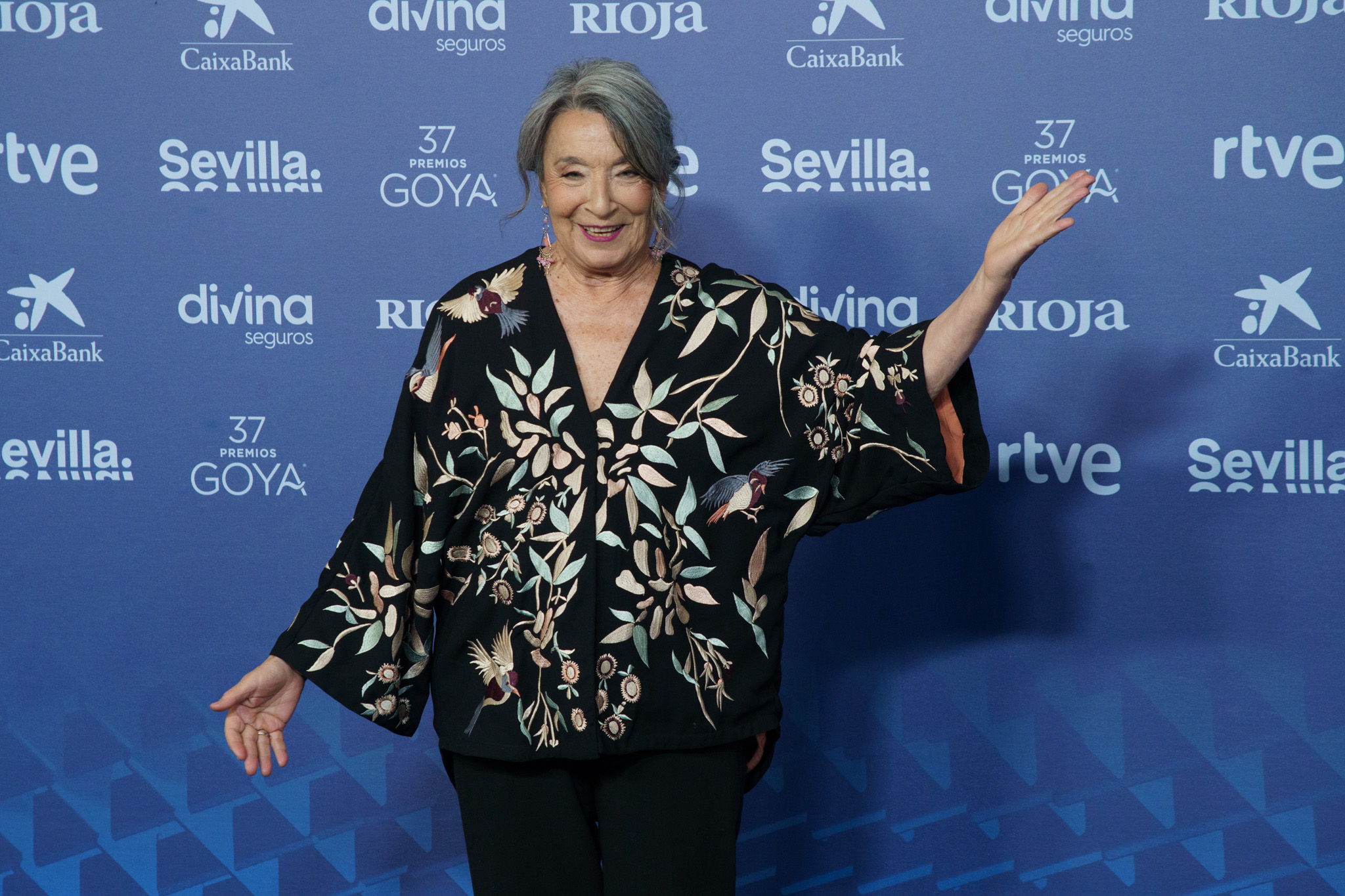
- Martínez in 2023
- Born: Petra Martínez Pérez; 24 June 1944 (age 81); Linares, Spain
- Education: Teatro Estudio de Madrid
- Occupation: Actress
- Years active: 1967–present
- Spouse: Juan Margallo (m. 1968; died 2025)
- Children: 2

Petra Martínez Pérez (born 24 June 1944) is a Spanish actress who has had a long career on stage, film and television.

== Career ==
Martínez was in the cast of the 1967 stage play Twelfth Night by William Shakespeare.

In 2011, Uroc Teatro, founded by Martínez and husband Juan Margallo, received the Medalla de Oro al Mérito en las Bellas Artes. In 2012, she was nominated to Premio Luna de Islantilla for Best Actress at Festival Internacional de Cine Bajo la Luna Islantilla Cinefórum for the film Libre directo. In 2014, she featured in the television series La que se avecina, playing Fina.

In 2017, Martínez received the Premio Jiennenses de Cultura, given by Diario Jaén. On 18 March 2017, she earned the 'San Pancracio' Honorary Award at the Festival Solidario de Cine Español de Cáceres alongside actors Roberto Álamo, Laia Marull, Carlos Santos, Ana Castillo, directors Koldo Serra and Salvador Calvo and stage designer Marcelo Pacheco.

In 2021, she starred in David Martín de los Santos's That Was Life as María. Her performance clinched her a Feroz Award for Best Actress and a nomination for Best Actress at the 36th Goya Awards.

== Personal life ==
In 1968, Martínez married her eventual longtime domestic and artistic partner Juan Margallo in Gibraltar in a ceremony without legal validity to Spanish authorities (their marriage was legally formalised circa 2018).

In 2017, she created an Instagram account because she was usurped so many times.

== Filmography ==
=== Film ===
Year	Title	Role	Notes	Ref.
1977	Camada negra (Black Brood)	Librera		
1999	Nadie conoce a nadie (Nobody Knows Anybody)			
2001	Salvajes (Savages)	Conchita		
2004	La mala educación (Bad Education)	Madre		
2004	Escuela de seducción			
2006	La noche de los girasoles (The Night of the Sunflowers)	Marta		
2010	Que se mueran los feos (To Hell with the Ugly)			
2011	Mientras duermes (Sleep Tight)	Señora Verónica		
2013	Todas las mujeres (All the Women)	Amparo		
2015	Palmeras en la nieve (Palm Trees in the Snow)	Julia		
2018	Petra	Julia		
2020	La vida era eso (That Was Life)	María		
2023	Cerrar los ojos (Close Your Eyes)	Sister Consuelo		
