= Benito Zambrano =

Spanish film director and cinematographer

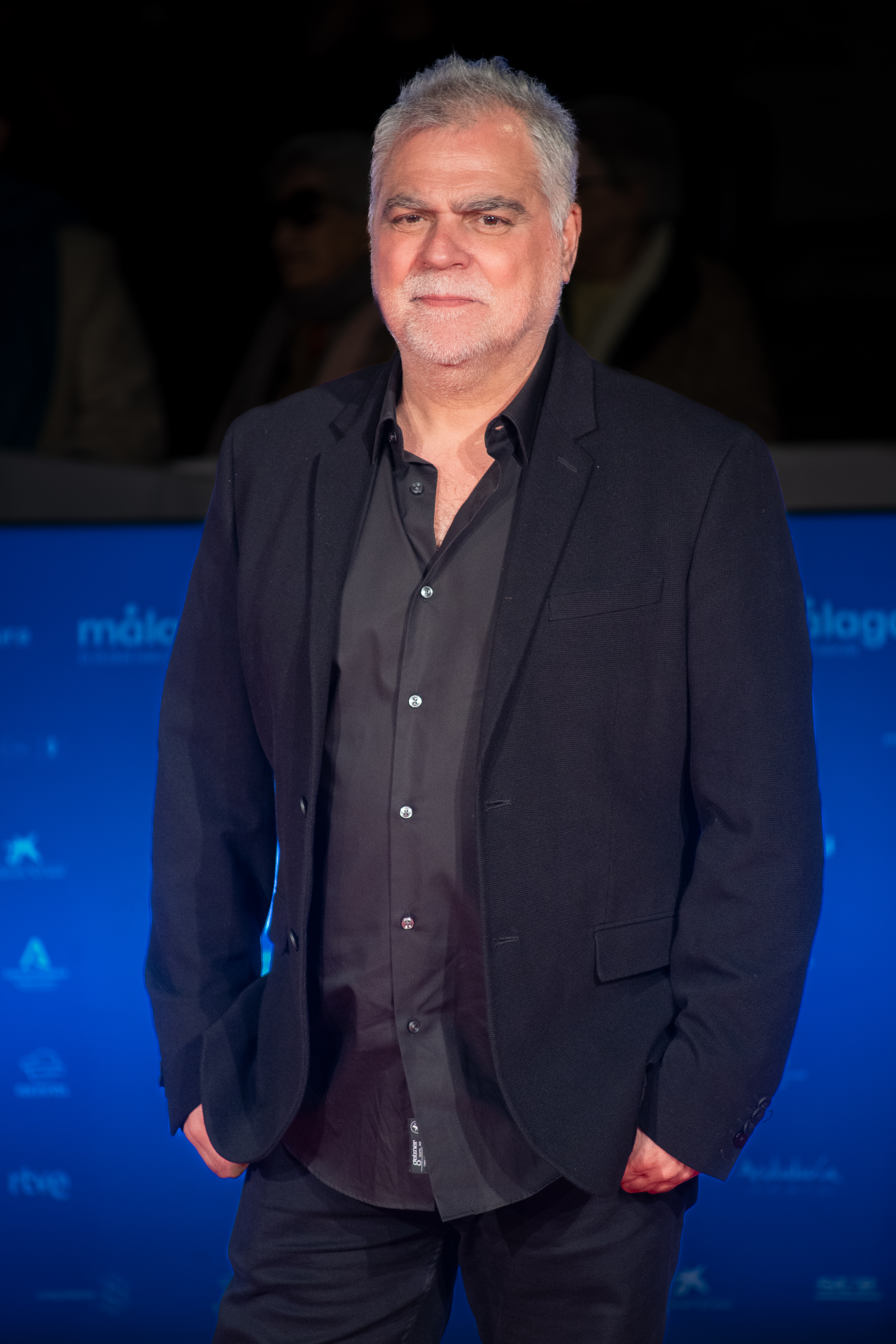
Zambrano in 2024

Benito Zambrano (Lebrija, 20 March 1965), is an awarded Spanish screenwriter and film director. His film Habana Blues was screened in the Un Certain Regard section at the 2005 Cannes Film Festival. He studied at Escuela Internacional de Cine y Television in San Antonio de Los Baños, Cuba.

== Filmography ==
- Melli 1990 (short film)
- Un niño mal nacido 1989 (short film)
- ¿Quién soy yo? 1988 (short film)
- La última humillación 1987 (short film)
- ¿Para qué sirve un río? 1991
- Los que se quedaron 1993
- El encanto de la luna llena 1995
- Solas 1998
- Padre Coraje 2002 (tv miniserie)
- Habana Blues 2005
- La voz dormida (The Sleeping Voice) 2011
- Intemperie (Out in the Open) 2019
- Pan de limón con semillas de amapola (Lemon and Poppy Seed Cake) 2021
- El salto (Jumping the Fence) 2024
