= 40th Goya Awards =

Spanish film awards

- Date: 28 February 2026
- Site: Auditori Fòrum, Barcelona, Spain
- Hosted by: Luis Tosar; Rigoberta Bandini
- Organized by: Academy of Cinematographic Arts and Sciences of Spain

Highlights
- Best Film: Sundays
- Best Direction: Alauda Ruiz de Azúa; Sundays
- Best Actor: Jose Ramon Soroiz; Maspalomas
- Best Actress: Patricia López Arnaiz; Sundays
- Most awards: Sirāt (6)
- Most nominations: Sundays (13)

Television coverage
- Network: La 1, RTVE Play
- Viewership: 2.40 million (26.0%)

The 40th Goya Awards ceremony, presented by the Academy of Cinematographic Arts and Sciences of Spain, took place at the Auditori Fòrum in Barcelona, Catalonia, on 28 February 2026. The gala was hosted by Rigoberta Bandini and Luis Tosar and was broadcast on La 1 and RTVE Play.

Sundays went to win five awards, including Best Film, Director, Actress, and Original Screenplay, while Sirāt swept craft categories.

== Background ==
In May 2025, Academy president Fernando Méndez-Leite announced Barcelona as the host city. In July 2025 the Academy presented the regulations for the 2026 awards. A key feature was the modification of the eligibility criteria for the Goya Award for Best New Director, changing the nature of the debut work from first ICAA-assessed feature film to first feature film released in theatres, thus enabling directors such as Eva Libertad (Deaf) with previous works without theatrical distribution (Nikolina) to be eligible for the award. In addition it was established than only one previously designated awardee was allowed to deliver a thank you speech during the gala for each award presentation. The final date of 28 February 2026 was announced in September 2025. The chosen date (somewhat delayed in relation to customary early February dates) set some distance with the celebration of the 18th Gaudí Awards of Catalan cinema on 8 February 2026 also due to be hold in Barcelona, but put the ceremony close to the 29th Málaga Film Festival, opening on 6 March 2026.

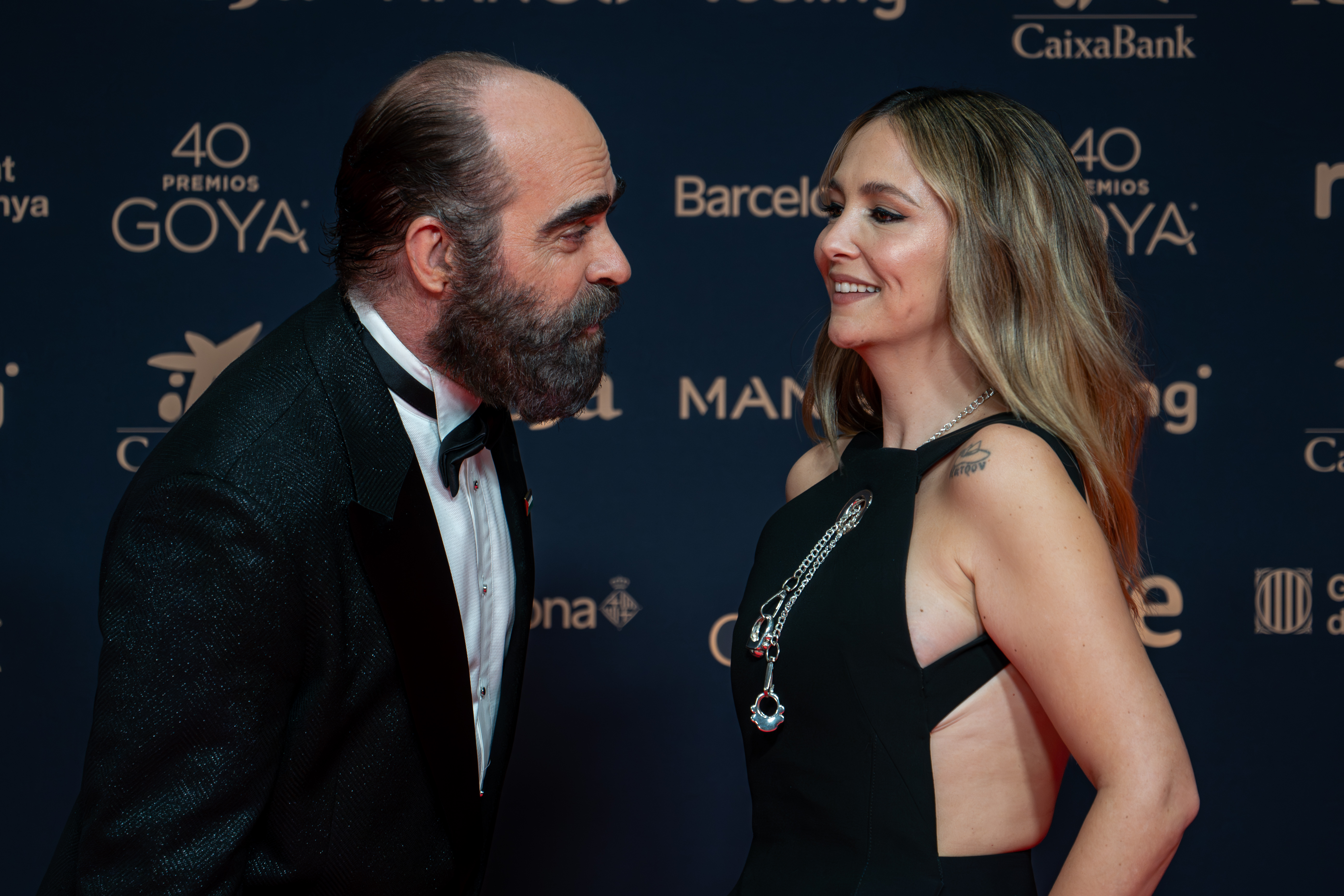
The ceremony hosts Luis Tosar (left) and Rigoberta Bandini (right)

On 21 October 2025, the Spanish Film Academy presented the 15 submissions (down from 17 in 2025) for the Goya Award for Best Ibero-American Film:

Under the Flags, the Sun (Paraguay), Banzo (Portugal), Belén (Argentina), Quadrilateral (Peru), El extraordinario viaje del dragón (Venezuela), The Mysterious Gaze of the Flamingo (Chile), La piel del agua (Costa Rica), La Virginia de los bolivianos (Bolivia), Los ahogados (Ecuador), Manas (Brazil), We Shall Not Be Moved (Mexico), A Poet (Colombia), Dogs (Uruguay), Beloved Tropic (Panama), and Sugar Island (Dominican Republic).

On 28 October 2025, Méndez-Leite announced Luis Tosar and Rigoberta Bandini as the gala hosts.

On 2 December 2025, the Spanish Film Academy presented the 18 submissions for the Goya Award for Best European Film:

Hollywoodgate and September 5 (Germany), Arco and A Simple Accident (France); The Love That Remains and The Mountain (Iceland); The Boy with Pink Pants and Naples to New York (Italy); Poison and Slocum et moi (Luxembourg), I Only Rest in the Storm and On Falling (Portugal), Young Mothers (Belgium), Fiume o morte! (Croatia), The Girl with the Needle (Denmark), Sentimental Value (Norway), Conclave (United Kingdom), and Late Shift (Switzerland).

The nominations were read by Toni Acosta and Arturo Valls from the academy headquarters on 13 January 2026.

Musical performances by Belén Aguilera, Bad Gyal, Dani Fernández, La Casa Azul, Ana Mena, Alba Molina, and Ángeles Toledano as well as by the co-host Rigoberta Bandini were announced ahead of the ceremony.

The linear television broadcast on La 1 commanded 2,396,000 viewers (26% audience share).

== Winners and nominees ==
The winners and nominees are listed as follows:

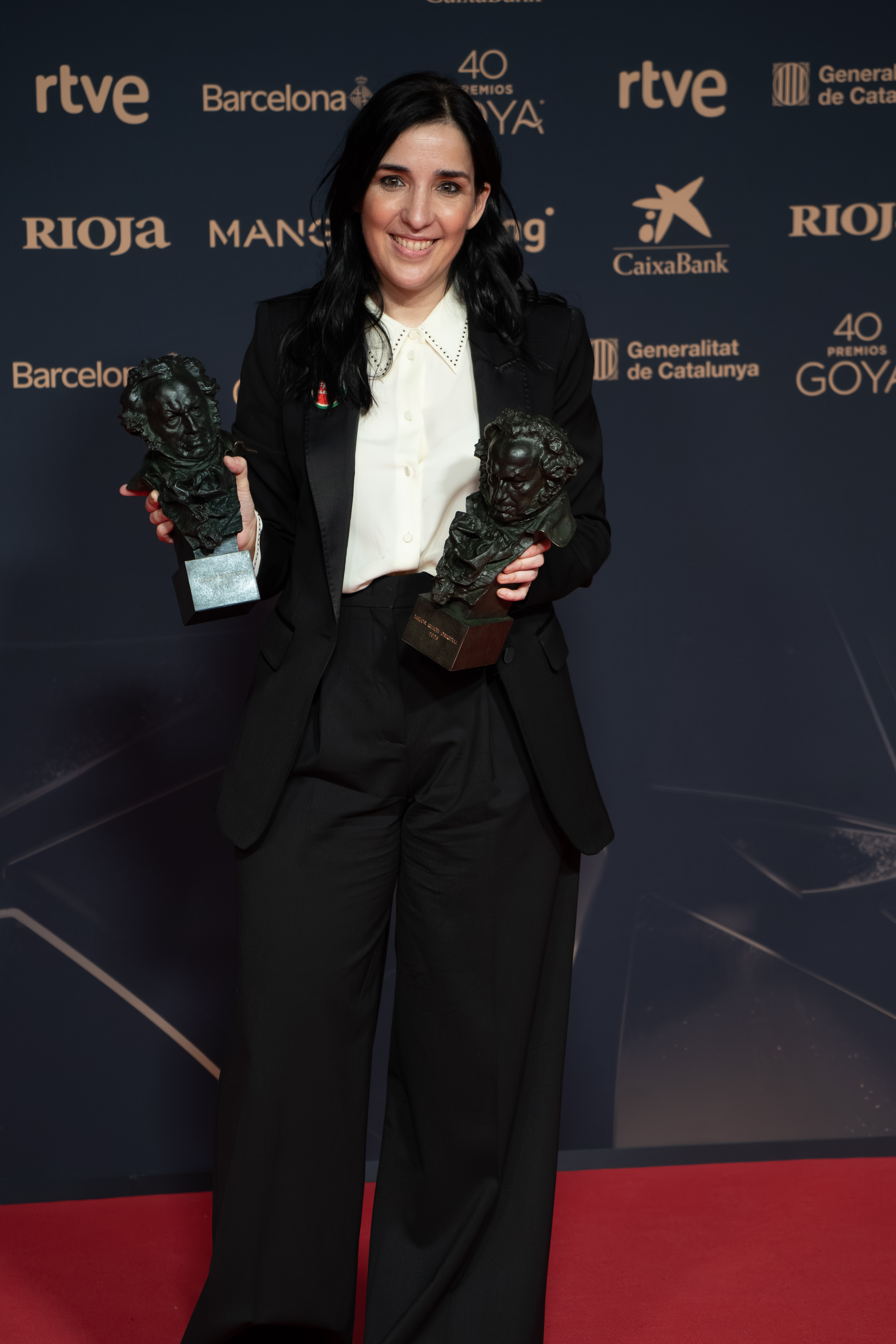
Alauda Ruiz de Azúa, Best Director and Best Original Screenplay winner

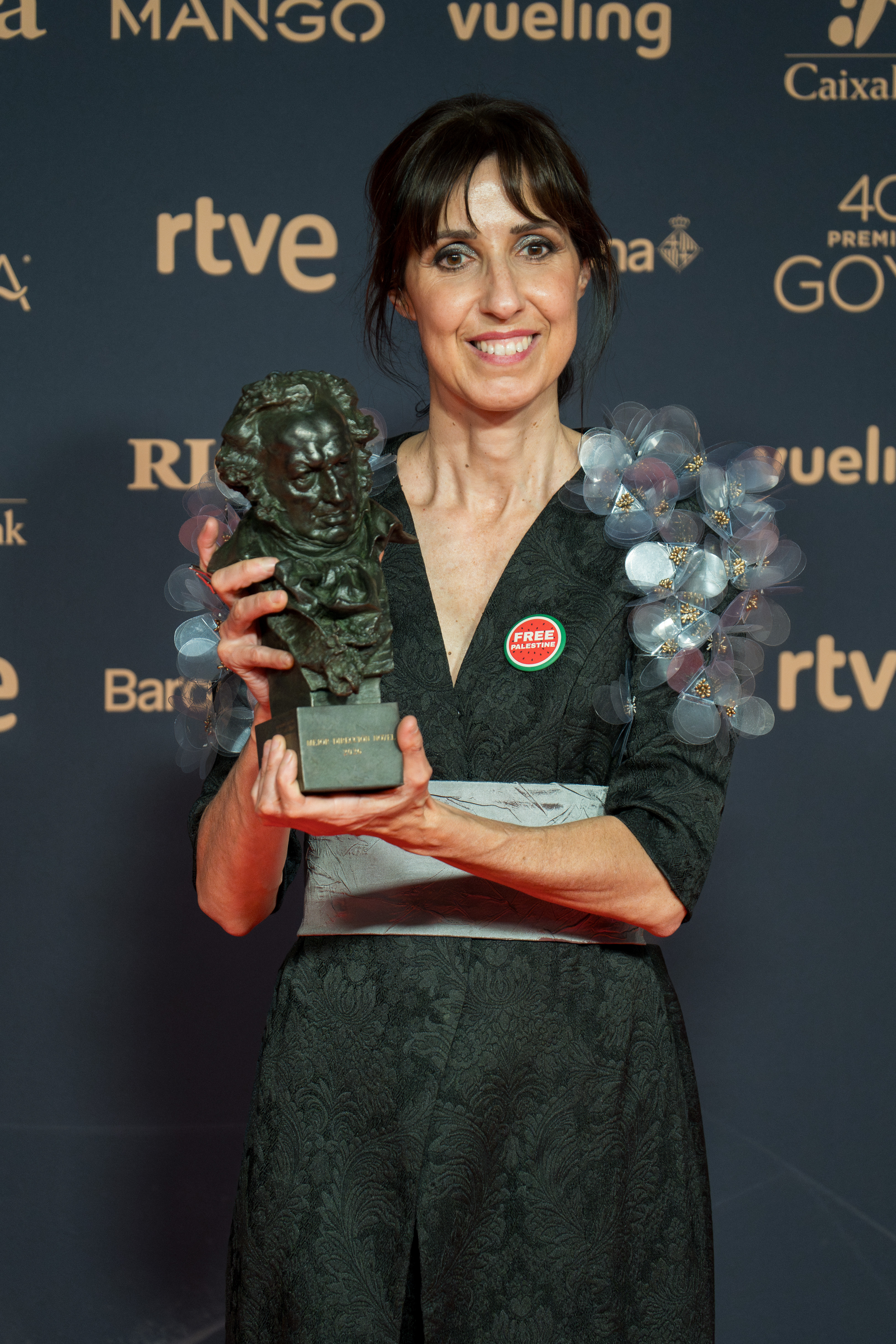
Eva Libertad, Best New Director winner

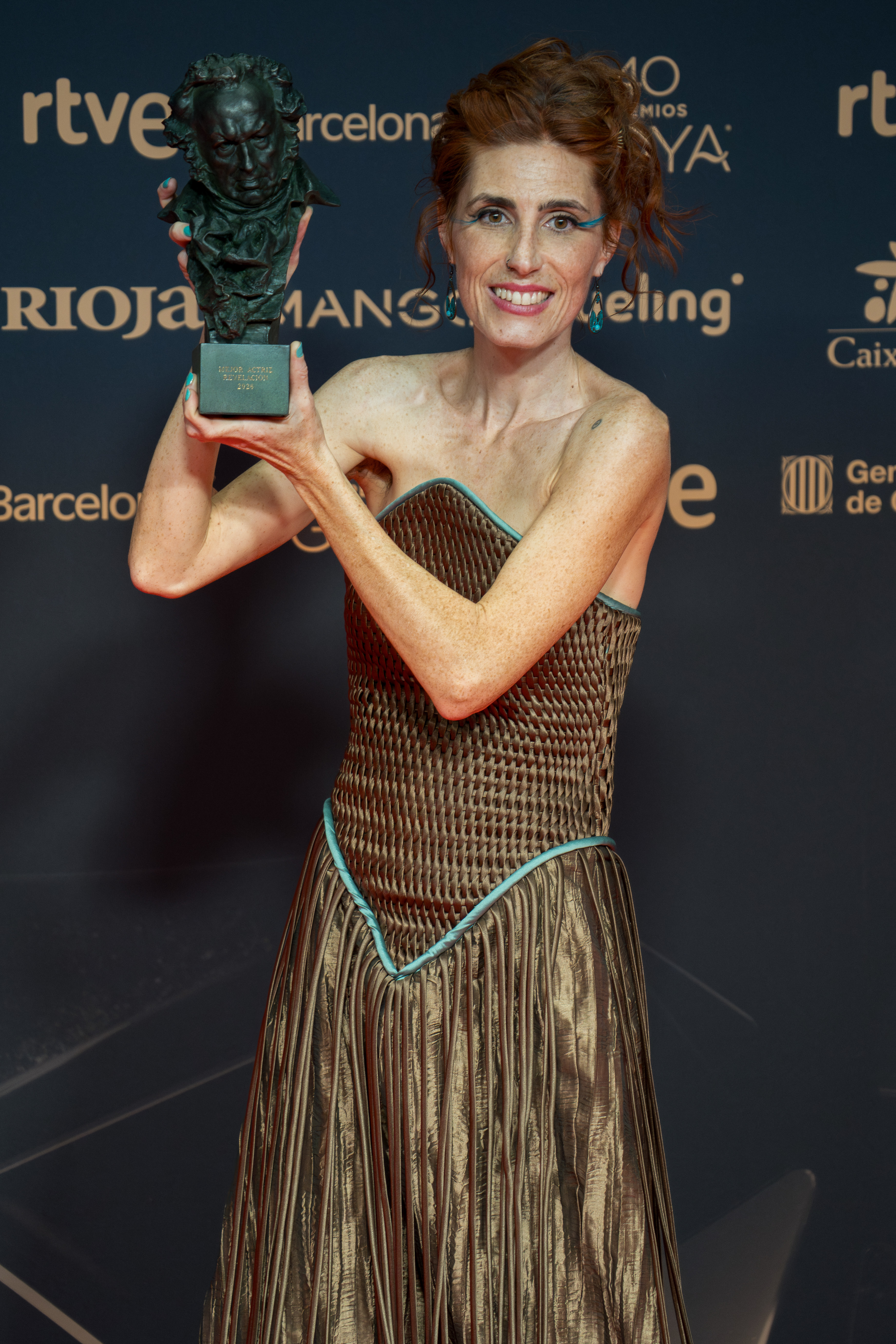
Miriam Garlo, Best New Actress winner

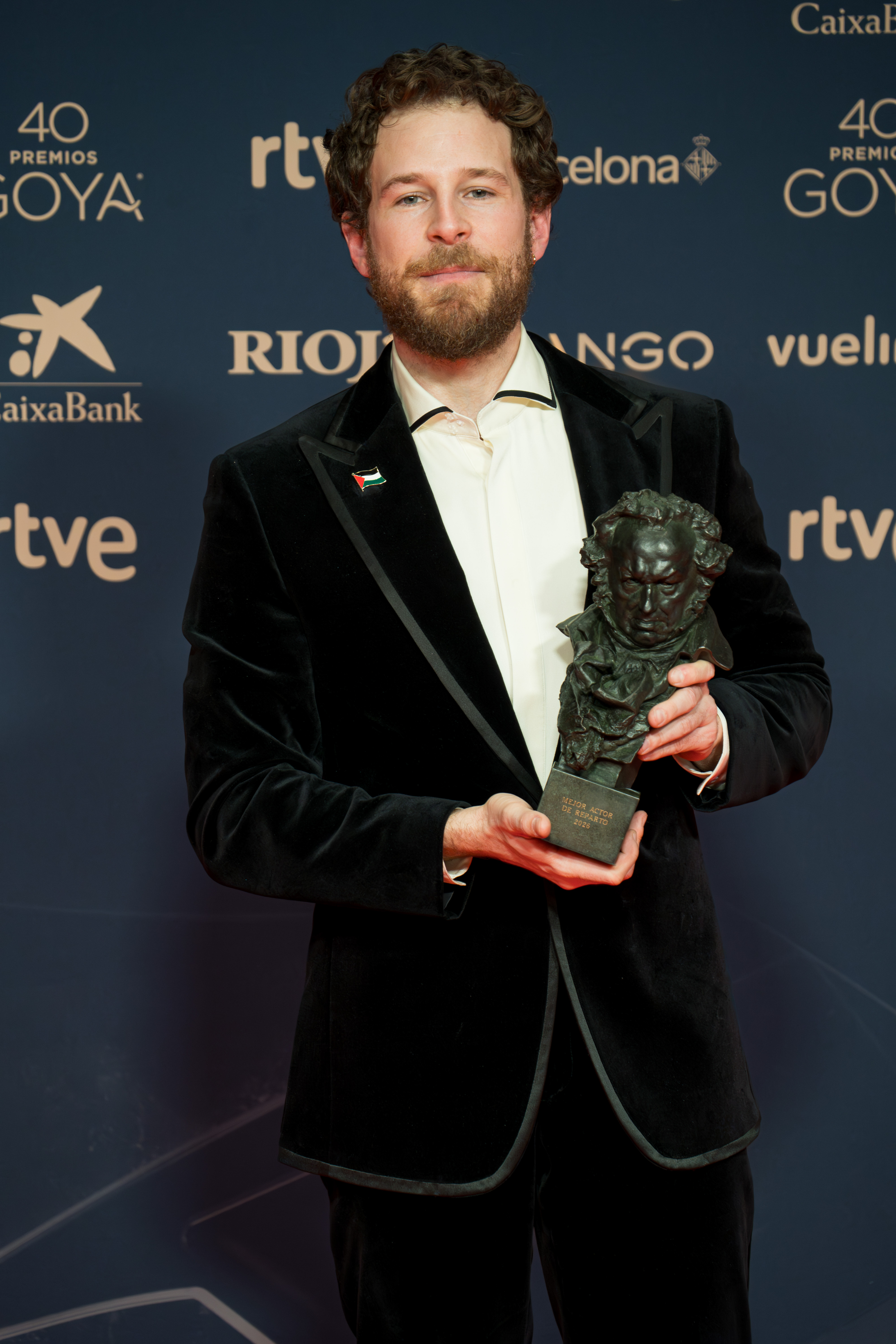
Álvaro Cervantes, Best Supporting Actor winner

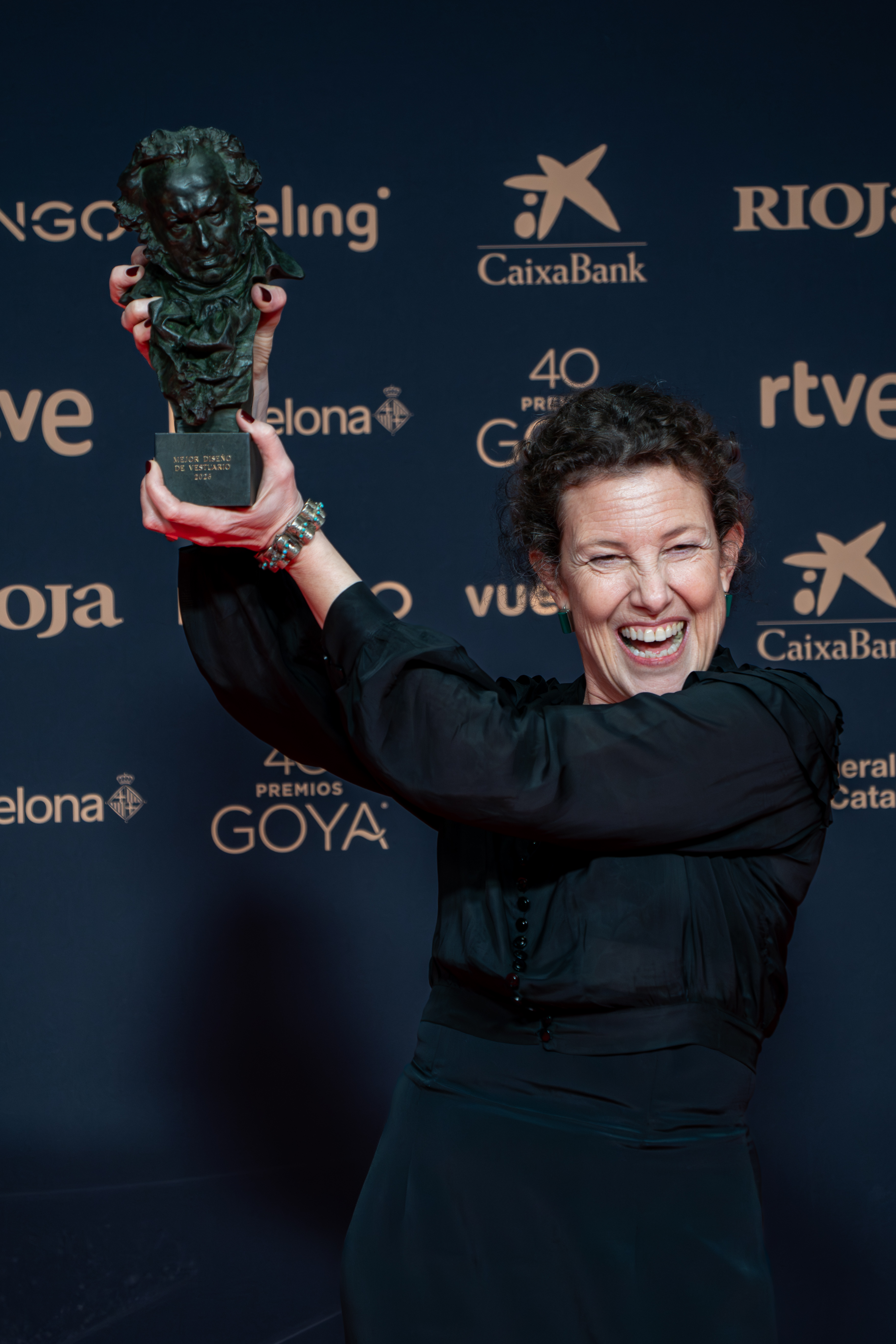
Helena Sanchis, Best Costume Design winner

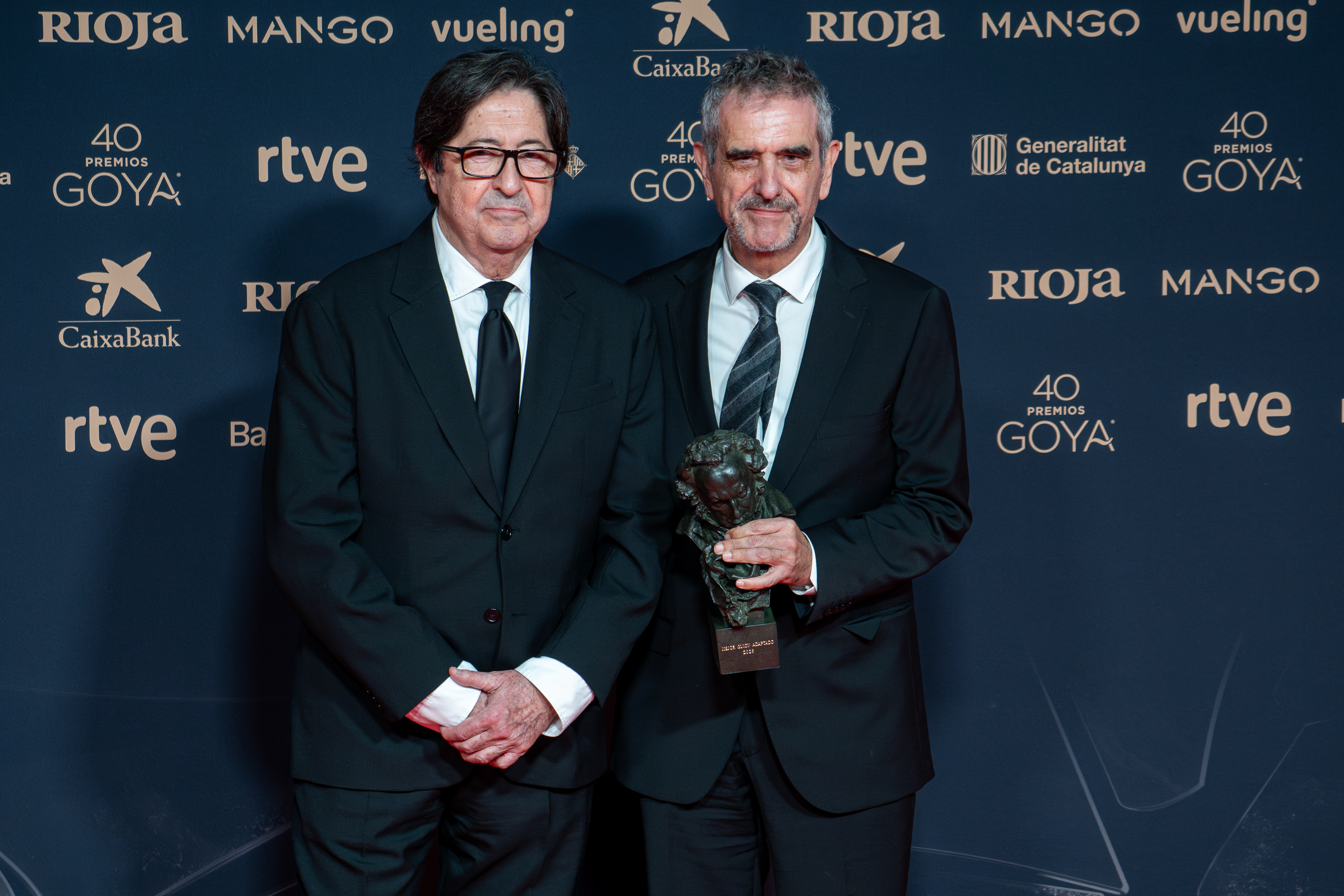
Manuel Gómez Pereira and Joaquín Oristrell, Best Adapted Screenplay winners

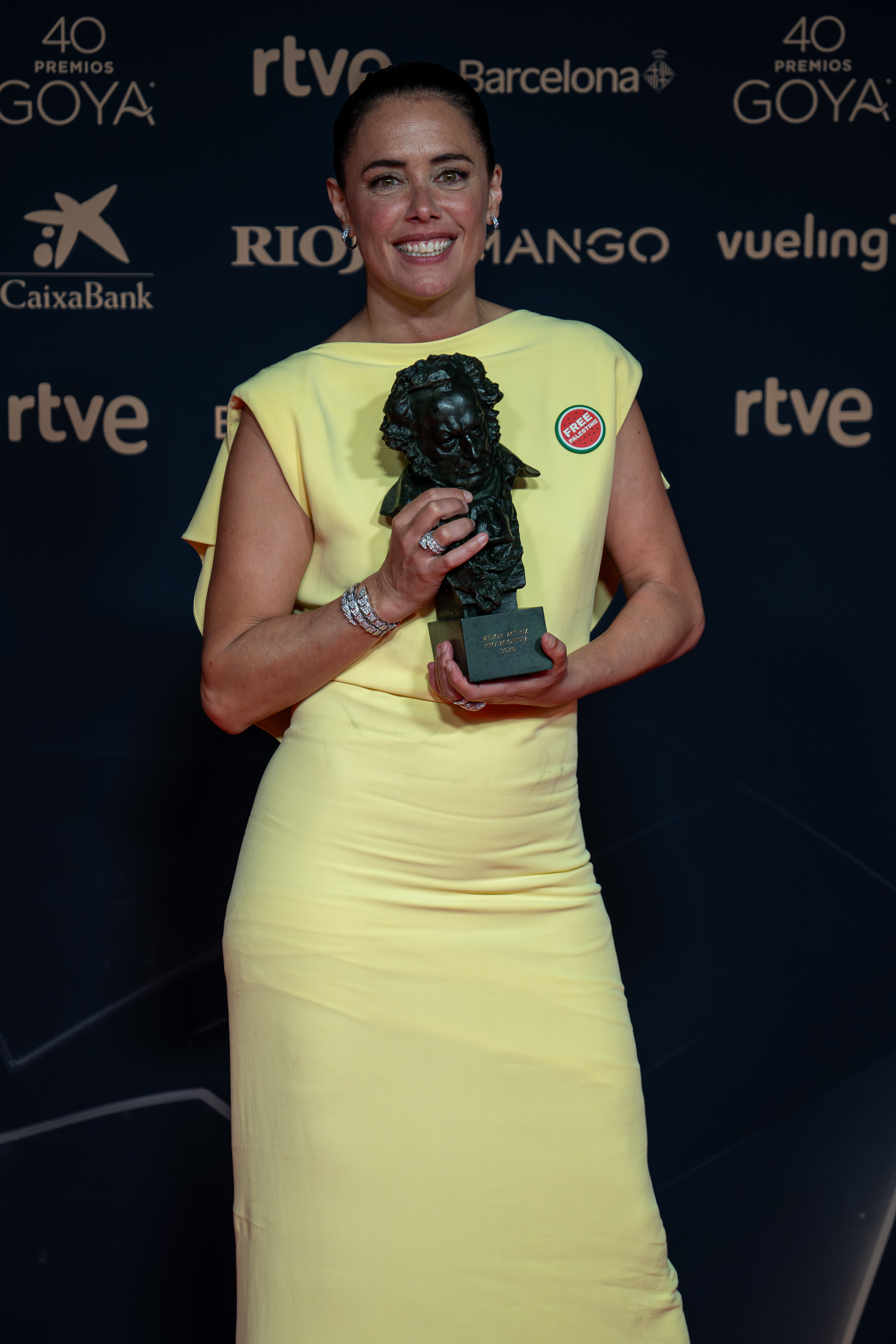
Patricia López Arnaiz, Best Actress winner

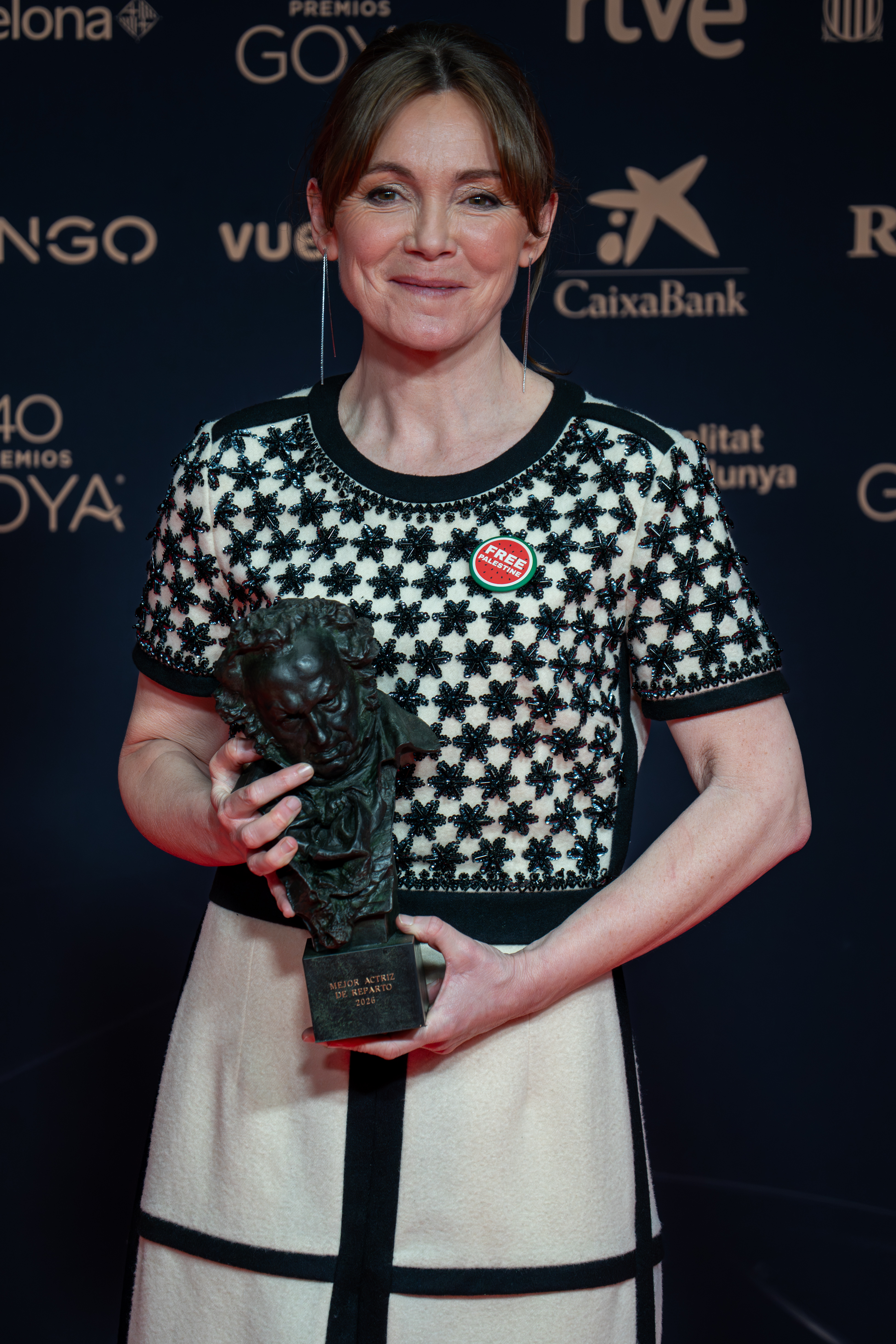
Nagore Aranburu, Best Supporting Actress winner

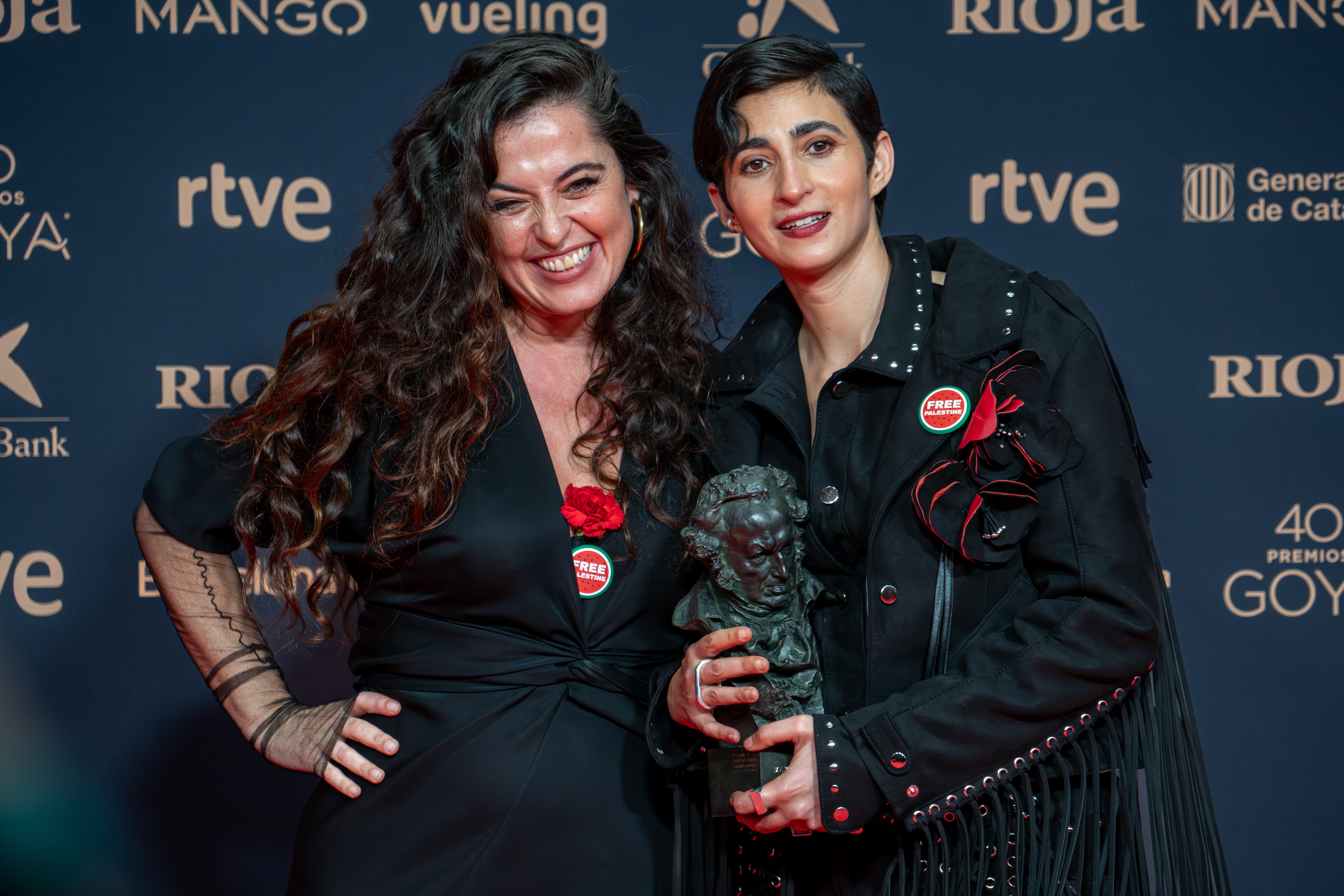
Sílvia Pérez Cruz and Alba Flores, Best Original Song winners

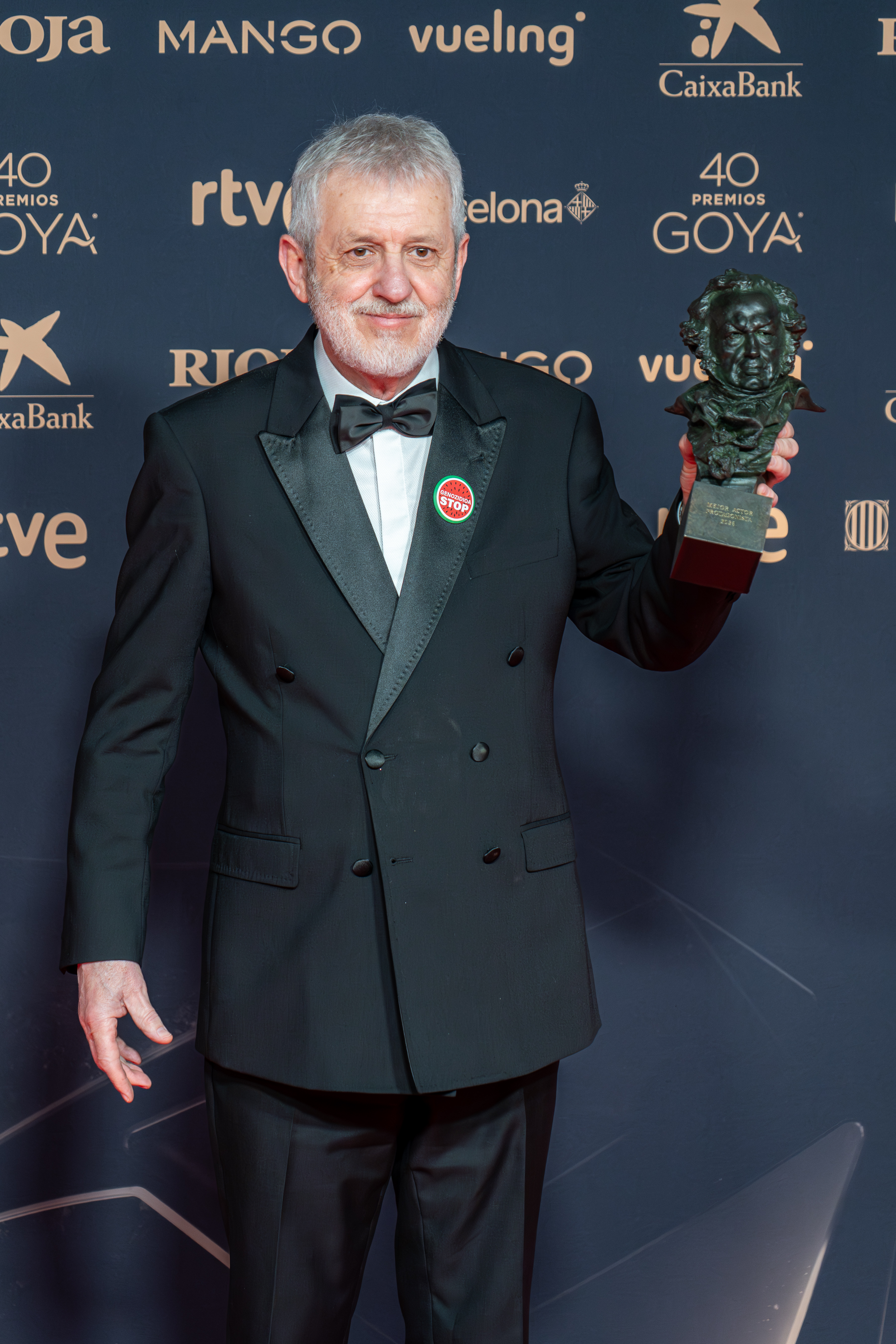
José Ramón Soroiz, Best Actor winner

Best Film: Sundays – Manu Calvo, Marisa Fernández Armenteros, Nahikari Ipiña, Sandra Hermida (producers); The Dinner – Cristóbal García, Lina Badenes, Roberto Butragueño (producers); Maspalomas – Ander Barinaga-Rementeria Arano, Ander Sagardoy Múgica, Fernando Larrondo, Xabier Berzosa (producers); Sirāt – Agustín Almodóvar, Esther García, Oriol Maymó, Xavi Font (producers); Deaf – Adolfo Blanco, Miriam Porté, Nuria Muñoz Ortín (producers)	Best Director: Alauda Ruiz de Azúa — Sundays; Aitor Arregi, Jose Mari Goenaga — Maspalomas; Carla Simón — Romería; Oliver Laxe — Sirāt; Albert Serra — Afternoons of Solitude
Best Actor: José Ramón Soroiz — Maspalomas as Vicente; Alberto San Juan — The Dinner as Genaro; Miguel Garcés — Sundays as Iñaki; Mario Casas — Away as Sergio; Manolo Solo — The Portuguese House as Fernando / Manuel	Best Actress: Patricia López Arnaiz — Sundays as Maite; Ángela Cervantes — Fury as Alexandra; Antonia Zegers — The Exiles as Delia; Nora Navas — My Friend Eva as Eva; Susana Abaitua — She Walks in Darkness as Amaia
Best Supporting Actor: Álvaro Cervantes — Deaf as Héctor; Miguel Rellán — The Captive as Antonio de Sosa; Juan Minujín — Sundays as Pablo; Kandido Uranga — Maspalomas as Xanti; Tamar Novas — Band Together as Xoel	Best Supporting Actress: Nagore Aranburu — Sundays as Madre Priora Isabel; Elvira Mínguez — The Dinner as Juana; Miryam Gallego — Romería as Olalla; Elena Irureta — Deaf as Elvira; Maria de Medeiros — The Portuguese House as Amalia
Best New Actor: Antonio "Toni" Fernández Gabarre — Sleepless City as Toni; Julio Peña — The Captive as Miguel de Cervantes; Hugo Welzel — Enemies as Rubio; Jan Monter Palau — Strange River as Dídac; Mitch — Romería as Nuno	Best New Actress: Miriam Garlo — Deaf as Ángela; Nora Hernández — The Dinner as María; Blanca Soroa — Sundays as Ainara; Elvira Lara — The Exiles as Anabel; Llúcia Garcia — Romería as Marina
Best Original Screenplay: Alauda Ruiz de Azúa — Sundays; Jose Mari Goenaga — Maspalomas; Oliver Laxe, Santiago Fillol — Sirāt; Agustín Díaz Yanes — She Walks in Darkness; Avelina Prat — The Portuguese House	Best Adapted Screenplay: Joaquín Oristrell, Manuel Gómez Pereira, Yolanda García Serrano — The Dinner; based on the play La cena de los generales by José Luis Alonso de Santos; Guillermo Galoe, Víctor Alonso-Berbel — Sleepless City; based on the short film Aunque es de noche by Galoe; Celia Rico Clavellino — The Good Manners; based on the novel La buena letra by Rafael Chirbes; Carla Simón — Romería; based on the letters written by Simón's mother; Eva Libertad — Deaf; based on the short film Sorda by Libertad
Best Ibero-American Film: Belén · Argentina; The Mysterious Gaze of the Flamingo · Chile; La piel del agua · Costa Rica; Manas · Brazil; A Poet · Colombia	Best European Film: Sentimental Value · Norway; Conclave · United Kingdom; The Girl with the Needle · Denmark; On Falling · Portugal; It Was Just an Accident · France
Best New Director: Eva Libertad — Deaf; Ion de Sosa — Balearic; Jaume Claret Muxart — Strange River; Gemma Blasco — Fury; Gerard Oms — Away	Best Animated Film: Decorado – Alberto Vázquez, Chelo Loureiro, Iván Miñambres, Jose María Fernández de Vega (producers); Awakening Beauty – Bernabé Rico, Carlos Rosado Sibón, Manuel H. Martín, Olmo Figueredo González-Quevedo (producers); The Treasure of Barracuda – Adrián García, Álex Cervantes, Raphaële Ingberg, Valérie Delpierre (producers); Norbert – Álvaro Urtizberea, José Corral Llorente, Nacho La Casa, Pedro Hernández Santos (producers); Olivia and the Invisible Earthquake – Eduard Puertas Anfruns, Irene Iborra Rizo, Mikel Mas Bilbao, Ramón Alòs Sánchez (producers)
Best Cinematography: Mauro Herce — Sirāt; Rui Poças — Sleepless City; Bet Rourich — Sundays; Pau Esteve Birba — Los Tigres; Javier Agirre Erauso — Maspalomas	Best Editing: Cristóbal Fernández — Sirāt; Victoria Lammers — Sleepless City; Andrés Gil — Sundays; José M. G. Moyano — Los Tigres; Bernat Vilaplana — She Walks in Darkness
Best Art Direction: Laia Ateca Font — Sirāt; Juan Pedro de Gaspar — The Captive; Koldo Vallés — The Dinner; Pepe Domínguez del Olmo — Los Tigres; Mikel Serrano — Maspalomas	Best Production Supervision: Oriol Maymó — Sirāt; Antonello Novellino — Sleepless City; Sergio Díaz Bermejo — The Captive; Itziar García Zubiri — Sundays; Begoña Muñoz Corcuera — Los Tigres
Best Sound: Amanda Villavieja, Laia Casanovas, Yasmina Praderas — Sirāt; Aitor Berenguer, Gabriel Gutiérrez, Candela Palencia — The Captive; Andrea Sáenz Pereiro, Mayte Cabrera — Sundays; Daniel de Zayas, Gabriel Gutiérrez, Candela Palencia — Los Tigres; Urko Garai, Enrique G. Bermejo, Alejandro Castillo — Deaf	Best Special Effects: Paula Gallifa Rubia, Ana Rubio — Los Tigres; César Moreno, Ana Rubio, Juanma Nogales — Enemies; Jon Serrano, Mariano García Marty; David Heras; Iñaki Gil “Ketxu” — Gaua; Pep Claret, Benjamín Ageorges — Sirāt; Jon Serrano, Mariano García Marty, Laura Pedro — She Walks in Darkness
Best Costume Design: Helena Sanchis — The Dinner; Nicoletta Taranta — The Captive; Nerea Torrijos — Gaua; Ana Martínez Fesser — Sundays; Anna Aguilà — Romería	Best Makeup and Hairstyles: Ana López-Puigcerver, Belén López-Puigcerver, Nacho Díaz — The Captive; Patricia López, Paco Rodríguez H., Nacho Díaz— Gaua; Sarai Rodríguez, David Moreno, Óscar del Monte — The Truce; Karmele Soler, Sergio Pérez Berbel — Maspalomas; Zaira Eva Adén — Sirāt
Best Original Score: Kangding Ray — Sirāt; Carla F. Benedicto — The Talent; Iván Palomares de la Encina — Leo & Lou; Julio de la Rosa — Los Tigres; Aránzazu Calleja — Maspalomas	Best Original Song: Alba Flores, Sílvia Pérez Cruz — "Flores para Antonio" from Flores para Antonio; Paloma Peñarrubia Ruiz — "La Arepera" from White Roses, Fall!; Leiva — "Hasta que me quede sin voz" from Hasta que me quede sin voz; Víctor Manuel — "Y mientras tanto, canto" from The Dinner; Blanca Paloma Ramos, Jose Pablo Polo, Luis Ivars — "Caminar el tiempo" from Hidden Murder
Best Fictional Short Film: Ángulo muerto – José Luis Rancaño, Pablo López Torres (producers); Cristian Beteta (director); De sucre – Ariadna Dot, Rafa Molés, Tono Folguera (producers); Clàudia Cedó (director); El cuento de una noche de verano – Emilia Fort, María Herrera, Stefan Schmitz (producers); María Herrera (director); Sexo a los 70 – Beatriz Bodegas, Paloma Tejero, Raúl Ruano (producers); Vanesa Romero (director); Una cabeza en la pared – Alberto Torres, Diego Saniz, Jorge Acosta, Manuel Manrique (producers); Manuel Manrique (director)	Best Animated Short Film: Gilbert – Mónica Gallego (producer); Alex Salu, Arturo Lacal, Jordi Jiménez (directors); Buffet paraiso – Álex Cervantes, Roger Torras (producers); Héctor Zafra, Santi Amézqueta (directors); Carmela – David Castro González, Ilan Urroz, Leticia Montalvá (producers); Vicente Mallols (director); El corto de Rubén – Jose María Fernández de Vega (producer and director); El estado del Alma – Diogo Carvalho, Jose María Fernández de Vega, Nuno Beato (producers); Sara Naves (director)
Best Documentary Film: Afternoons of Solitude – Albert Serra, Luis Ferrón, Montse Triola, Pedro Palacios; Todos somos Gaza – Anuska Simón, Hernán Zin, Khaled Habayed, Yousef Hammash; Eloy de la Iglesia. Adicto al cine – Gaizka Urresti, Julio Díez, Oihana Olea; Flores para Antonio – Alba Flores, Bruna Hernando, Elena Molina, Isaki Lacuesta; The Sleeper. El caravaggio perdido – Álvaro Longoria, Francisco Pou, Gerardo Olivares, Ricardo Fernández-Deu	Best Documentary Short Film: El Santo – Adán Aliaga, Carlo D'Ursi, Miguel Molina Carmona (producers); Carlo D'Ursi (director); Dissonancia – Eva Patricia Fernández Manzano, Rafael Linares (producers); Raquel Larrosa (director); La conversación que nunca tuvimos – Cristina Urgel, Eva Moreno (producers); Cristina Urgel (director); The Painter's Room – Bernat Manzano, Miguel Ángel Blanca, Montse Pujol Solà (producers); María Colomer Canyelles (director); Zona Wao – Izaskun Arandia, Nagore Eceiza Mugica (producers); Nagore Eceiza Mugica (director)

=== Films with multiple nominations and awards ===
Films with multiple nominations
Nominations	Film
13	Sundays
11	Sirāt
9	Maspalomas
8	The Dinner
7	Los Tigres
7	The Captive
7	Deaf
6	Romería
5	Sleepless City
4	She Walks in Darkness
3	Gaua
3	The Portuguese House
2	The Exiles
2	Fury
2	Away
2	Enemies
2	Strange River
2	Flores para Antonio
2	Afternoons of Solitude

Films with multiple awards
Awards	Film
6	Sirāt
5	Sundays
3	Deaf
2	The Dinner

== Honorary Goya ==
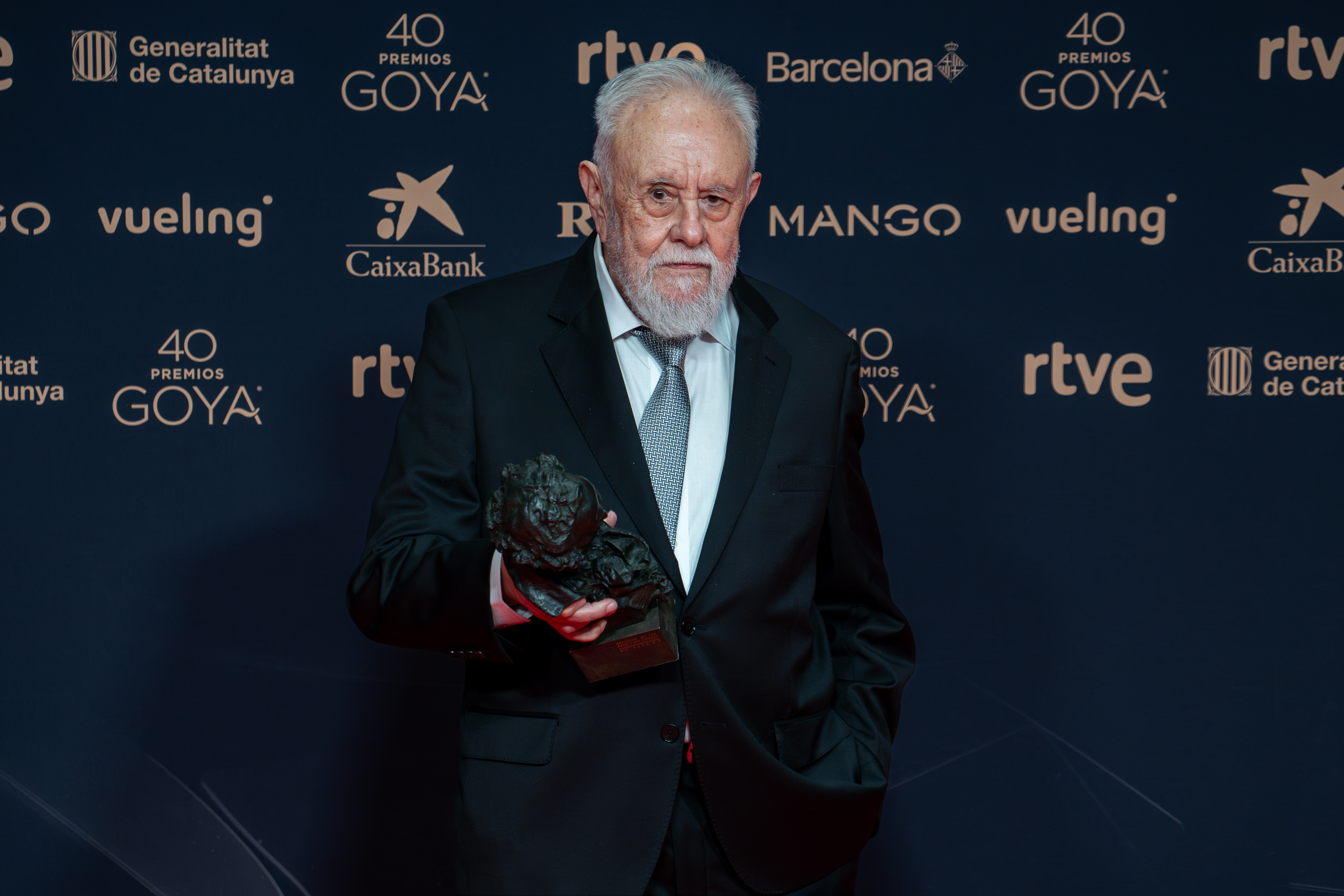
Gonzalo Suárez, Honorary Goya Award winner

On 29 July 2025, director, screenwriter, producer, writer, sports journalist, and actor Gonzalo Suárez was announced as the recipient of the Honorary Goya Award. The managing board of the academy recognised "a trajectory from which he has developed a surprising filmography, in which he has experimented with all genres and from all attitudes, and which has contributed to make him a key man in the Spanish culture of the last sixty years".

== International Goya ==
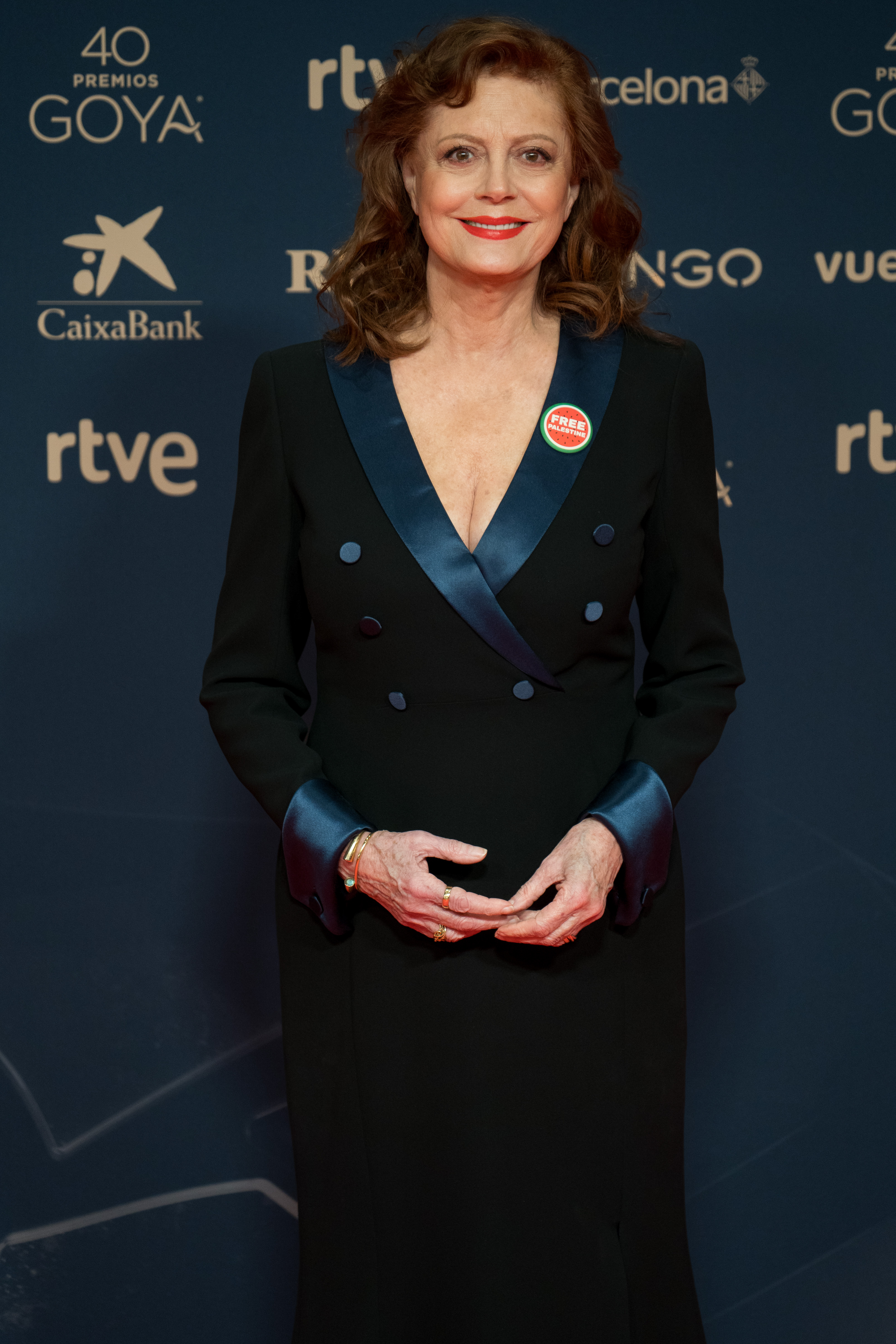
International Goya winner Susan Sarandon attending the gala

On 28 January 2026, American actress Susan Sarandon was announced as the recipient of the International Goya Award. The academy highlighted "an extraordinary filmography, with unforgettable performances in masterpieces and also in films that are part of popular culture; and her courageous political and social commitment".

== In Memoriam ==
The In Memoriam tribute was accompanied by the performance of Belén Aguilera and Dani Fernández, who delivered a version of Extremoduro's "Si te vas". It paid tribute to individuals including Verónica Echegui, Lea Massari, Isabel Pisano, Héctor Alterio, Eusebio Poncela, Celso Bugallo, Adolfo Fernández, Fernando Esteso, Juan Margallo, Manolo Zarzo, Mariano Ozores, Julio Fernández, Mario Vargas Llosa, and José Luis Cienfuegos.
