= Blanca Soroa =

Spanish actress (born 2008)

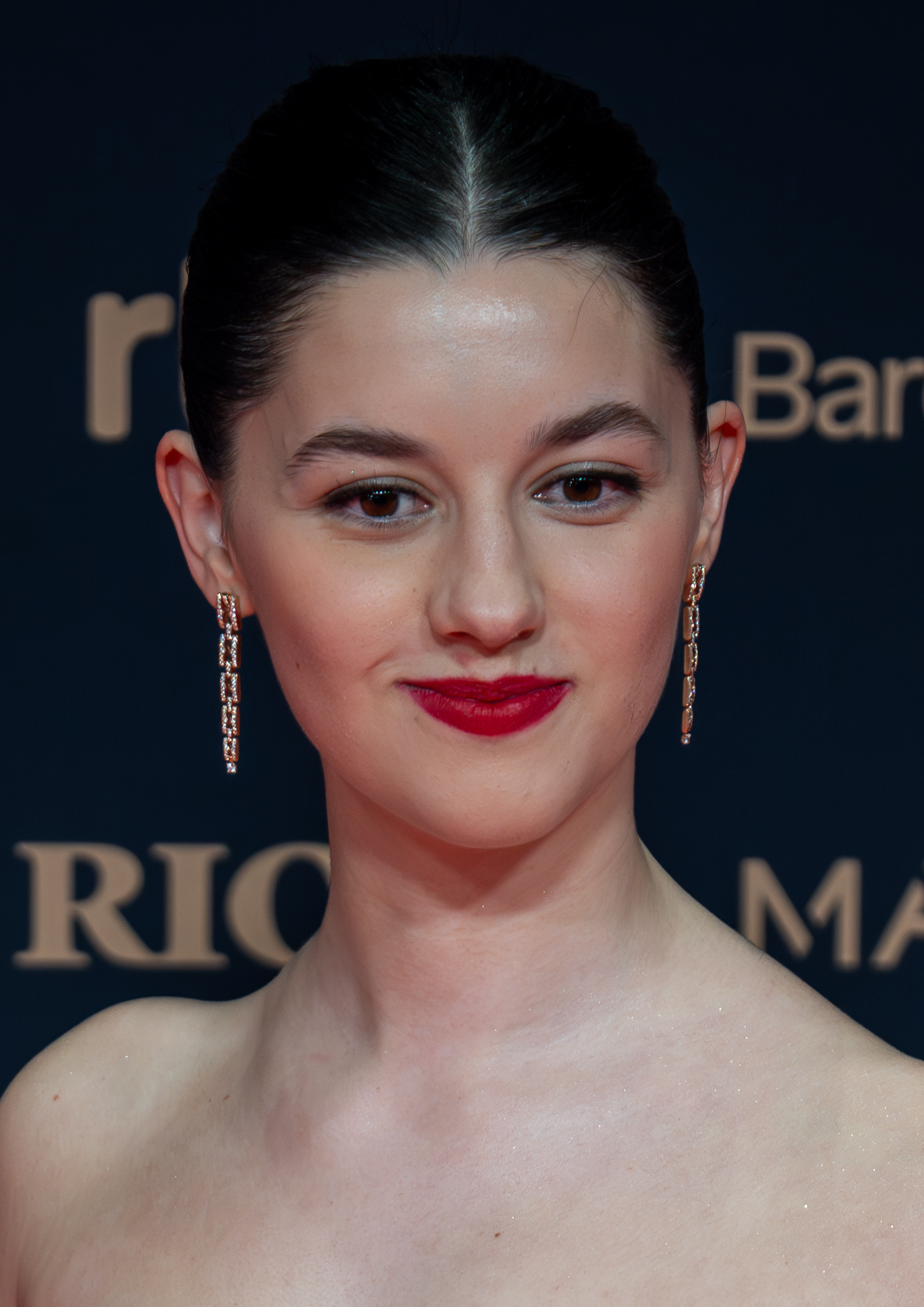
- Soroa in 2026
- Born: Blanca Soroa Palos; September 23, 2008 (age 17); A Coruña, Spain
- Occupation: Actress
- Years active: 2025–present

Blanca Soroa Palos (born 23 September 2008) is a Spanish actress. Chosen from among more than 600 candidates in a mass casting call and with no previous acting experience, she made her screen debut as Ainara, a teenager whose religious vocation leads her to announce that she wants to enter a cloistered convent, in Los domingos (2025), directed by Alauda Ruiz de Azúa; the performance brought her nominations at both the Goya Awards and the Feroz Awards.

Los domingos had its world premiere at the 73rd San Sebastián International Film Festival in September 2025, where it won the Golden Shell for best film, the FIPRESCI Prize and the Irizar Basque Film Award. In May 2026 Soroa won the Platino Award for best female performance for the role.

== Early life ==
Soroa was born in A Coruña, Galicia, in 2008 and moved to Getxo, in the Basque province of Biscay, at the age of eleven. She has studied piano and lyrical singing at a conservatory since she was a child, and combined her final year of secondary education at the Liceo Francés in Bilbao with red-carpet appearances. She had originally intended to study medicine. She is a niece of the film make-up artist Paula Soroa, although she reached the casting call for Los domingos on her own and the director was unaware of the family connection.

She has said that she showed a strong artistic inclination from an early age, to the point that her teachers regularly told her parents that she was an artist, but that she regarded performing as an extracurricular hobby rather than a possible profession because she did not know how one entered the industry.

== Career ==
=== Casting and preparation ===
For Los domingos, Ruiz de Azúa looked for unknown teenagers without previous experience in schools in the Bilbao area. The casting directors Eva Leira and Yolanda Serrano visited Soroa's school to hold a first round of interviews during the morning break; Soroa put her name down because taking part meant she would not miss a lesson, and believed the audition was for a role as an extra. She went through as many as seven auditions before she was cast, and had never set foot on a film set. To prepare for the part she spent several weeks talking to nuns and reading first-hand accounts online, and worked with the director on a more sensory approach in order to convey the intangible experience of faith on screen.

Soroa was unable to attend school for three months during the shoot, and later said that combining her studies with the film's release and awards season had been complicated. She speaks Spanish, French, English and Italian.

=== Los domingos ===
In the film, Ainara, a teenager from a well-off Basque family, tells her widowed father (Miguel Garcés) that she wants to spend time with a community of cloistered nuns, led by a prioress (Nagore Aranburu), in order to confirm her vocation. The announcement spreads through the family, which meets for lunch every Sunday at the grandmother's home, and affects above all her aunt Maite (Patricia López Arnaiz), an active and ostensibly tolerant woman whose settled life is shaken by the conflict. Reviewing the premiere for Cineuropa, Alfonso Rivera called Soroa one of the most overwhelming discoveries of the season, and noted that the distributor BTeam Pictures would release the film in Spanish cinemas on 24 October 2025.

Euronews described Soroa as a brilliant newcomer and credited Ruiz de Azúa, who defines herself as a non-believer, with making the faith of her young protagonist comprehensible. The film took €3,917,743 at the Spanish box office and sold 623,474 tickets before the end of 2025, which made it the fourth highest-grossing Spanish release of the year.

=== Awards and recognition ===
The first prize Soroa received for the role was the "Ha nacido una estrella" (A Star Is Born) award of the RTVE programme Días de Cine, presented at the Museo Reina Sofía in Madrid in January 2026 at a ceremony where Los domingos was also named best Spanish film. Days later, at the 13th Feroz Awards, held in Pontevedra and awarded by the Spanish film press, Los domingos was the most rewarded title of the night with five prizes, including best drama film and best director.

In February 2026 Soroa won the Medal of the Círculo de Escritores Cinematográficos for best new actress; the film collected six medals in total, more than any other title that year. At the 40th Goya Awards, held in Barcelona, she was nominated for best new actress alongside Nora Hernández, Elvira Lara, Llúcia García and Miriam Garlo, who won the award for Deaf; Los domingos took five of the thirteen awards for which it was shortlisted, among them best film, best director and best original screenplay.

On 9 May 2026 Soroa received the Platino Award for best female performance in film at the 13th edition of the Ibero-American awards, held at the Teatro Gran Tlachco in the Xcaret park, on the Riviera Maya in Mexico.

== Filmography ==
=== Film ===
- Los domingos (2025) as Ainara
