= She Walks in Darkness =

- Promotional release poster
- Spanish: Un fantasma en la batalla
- Directed by: Agustín Díaz Yanes
- Written by: Agustín Díaz Yanes
- Produced by: J.A. Bayona; Belén Atienza; Sandra Hermida
- Starring: Susana Abaitua; Andrés Gertrúdix; Iraia Elias; Raúl Arévalo; Ariadna Gil
- Cinematography: Paco Femenía
- Edited by: Bernat Vilaplana
- Music by: Arnau Bataller
- Production company: Basoilarraren Filmak
- Distributed by: Tripictures
- Release dates: 24 September 2025 (Zinemaldia); 3 October 2025 (Spain)
- Country: Spain
- Language: Spanish

She Walks in Darkness (Spanish: Un fantasma en la batalla, lit. 'A ghost in the battle') is a 2025 Spanish political thriller film directed by Agustín Díaz Yanes starring Susana Abaitua.

== Plot ==
The plot follows Amaia, a Guardia Civil agent going undercover for years within the ETA ranks seeking to crack the location of the group's multiple weapons caches (zulos) scattered in southern France.

== Cast ==
- Susana Abaitua as Amaia
- Andrés Gertrúdix as teniente coronel Castro
- Iraia Elias as Begoña
- Raúl Arévalo as Arrieta
- Ariadna Gil as María Soledad Iparraguirre Guenechea, "Anboto"
- Eduardo Rejón
- Iñaki Balboa
- Jaime Chávarri as Txiki el Viejo
- Cris Iglesias as Adela
- Anartz Zuazua as Mikel Albisu Iriarte, "Antza"
- Mikel Losada as Iñaki Gracia Arregi, "Rentería"

== Production ==
Written by Agustín Díaz Yanes, the premise of She Walks in Darkness is similar to Arantxa Echevarría's Undercover (2024), which wrapped shooting some weeks before the intended beginning of the filming of She Walks in Darkness, although Echevarría's film follows closer the biography of Elena Tejada, while Díaz Yanes' film is more of an amalgam of stories of multiple Spanish law enforcement agents. The greenlight of a second film under such circumstances is not usual in Spanish cinema. Shooting locations included Gipuzkoa and Iparralde. The film is a Basoilarraren Filmak production. Paco Femenía worked as cinematographer.

== Release ==
The film was presented at the 73rd San Sebastián International Film Festival on 24 September 2025. It received a theatrical release in Spain on 3 October 2025 by Tripictures, followed by a streaming release on Netflix on 17 October 2025.

== Reception ==
Luis Martínez of El Mundo rated the film 4 out of 5 stars, considering that, just like Undercover, it is an excellent story perfectly coherent with its intentions.

Harri X. Fernández of Deia lamented that the characterisation of all the characters drawn by Díaz Yanes, starting by Abaitua's, is "one-dimensional", while pointing out that the film does not work as a thriller either as it "lacks tension and pace".

Alfonso Rivera of Cineuropa billed the film as "a gripping thriller of imposture, espionage and lies", sometimes feeling "like a horror flick, such is the anguish and tension of its scenes".

== Accolades ==
Year	Award	Category	Nominee(s)	Result	Ref.
2026	13th Feroz Awards	Best Supporting Actress in a Film	Iraia Elias	Nominated	
2026	81st CEC Medals	Best Original Screenplay	Agustín Díaz Yanes	Nominated	
2026	81st CEC Medals	Best Actress	Susana Abaitua	Nominated	
2026	81st CEC Medals	Best Editing	Bernat Vilaplana	Nominated	
2026	40th Goya Awards	Best Original Screenplay	Agustín Díaz Yanes	Nominated	
2026	40th Goya Awards	Best Actress	Susana Abaitua	Nominated	
2026	40th Goya Awards	Best Editing	Bernat Vilaplana	Nominated	
2026	40th Goya Awards	Best Special Effects	Jon Serrano, Mariano García Marty, Laura Pedro	Nominated	

== See also ==
- List of Spanish films of 2025
