= Eva Libertad =

Spanish film director and screenwriter (born 1978)

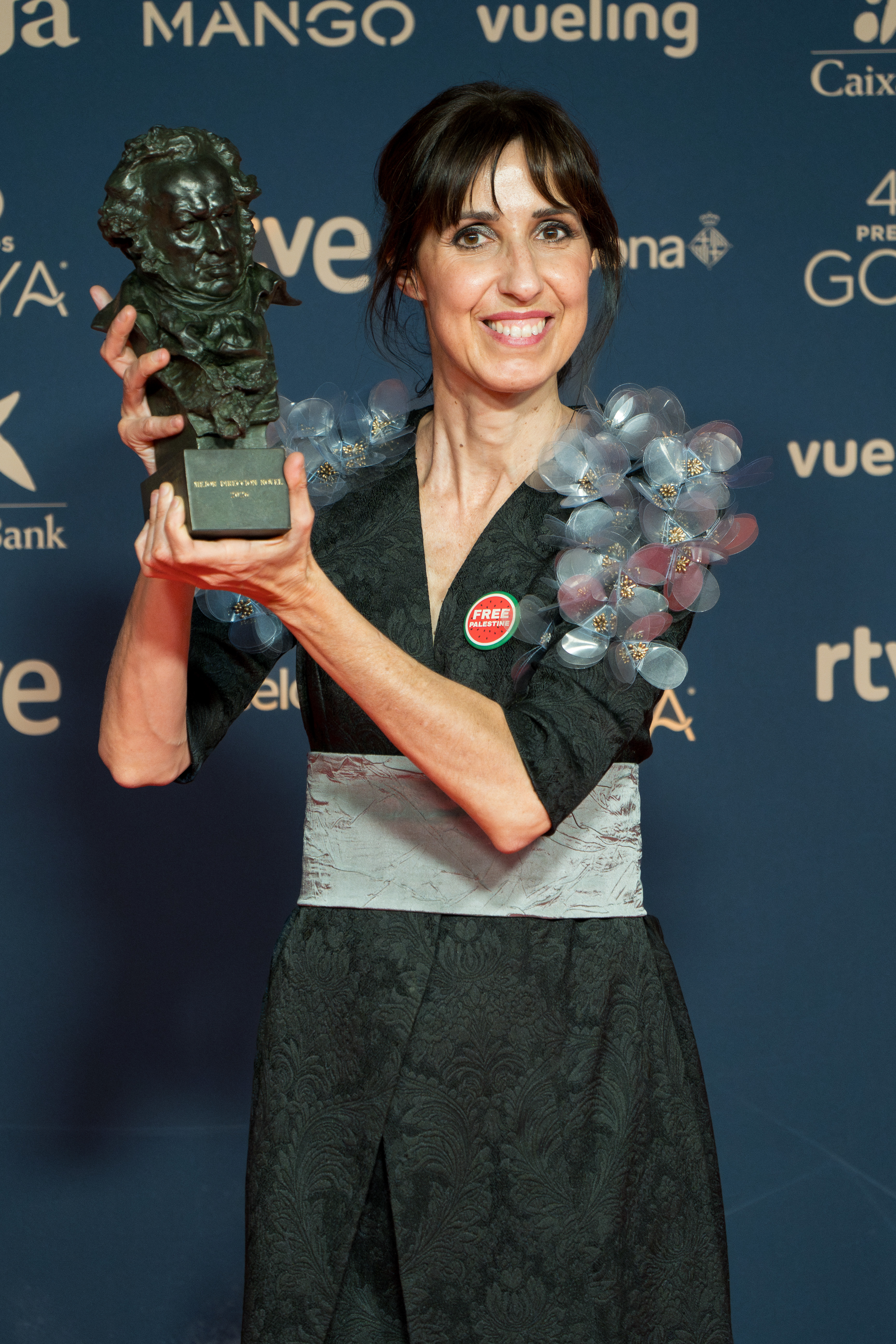
Eva Libertad showcasing her Goya Award for Best New Director in February 2026

Eva Libertad García López (born 7 October 1978) is a Spanish film director, screenwriter, and producer. Her film Deaf (2025) won her the Goya Award for Best New Director and the Lux Audience Award.

== Life ==
Born in Molina de Segura on 7 October 1978, she studied sociology at the Complutense University of Madrid, and later received a scholarship to study theater. She completed her acting training in Mexico and Argentina with Fernando Piernas and Augusto Fernandes. She then returned to Murcia where she began collaborating with cultural and feminist collectives.

In 2015, she joined the production company Nexus Films alongside fellow director Nuria Muñoz-Ortín. Her film work is characterized by addressing themes related to women and diversity. With this production company, she has written and directed numerous documentary and fiction projects, short films that have been screened at national and international festivals and a fiction program for the regional television channel La 7.

In 2019, she premiered her first short film, with LGBT themes, Leo and Alex in the 21st Century, co-directed with Nuria Muñoz-Ortín. In 2020, the TV movie Nikolina was released, a fantasy tale that garnered recognition at festivals.

In 2022, Libertad was nominated for a Goya Award in the Best Short Film category for her work Sorda, (Deaf) also co-directed with Nuria Muñoz-Ortín. It was the first film nominated for this award, that was shot in a sign language and performed by a deaf actress. The short film tells the story of a deaf woman who longs to be a mother, portrayed by actress Miriam Garlo, who is Libertad's sister. She co-directed the short fiction film Sorda, with Nuria Muñoz-Ortín, which in 2022 became the first work nominated for a Goya Award in sign language and performed by a deaf actress. The production also received numerous national and international awards.

In 2025, she expanded the short film's story into the feature film, Sorda, still starring Miriam Garlo, who has been deaf since the age of seven, and cast with Álvaro Cervantes and Elena Irureta. She won the Best New Director at the 40th Goya Awards in 2026. She was allowed to stand as a candidate after directing Nikolina due to modifications in the eligibility criteria for the category introduced in July 2025, changing the nature of the debut work from first ICAA-assessed feature film to first feature film released in theatres.

== Filmography ==
- 2019 – Leo y Alex en pleno siglo 21. (Leo and Alex in the 21st Century). Short film co-directed with Nuria Muñoz-Ortín.
- 2021 – Deaf. Short film co-directed with Nuria Muñoz-Ortín.
- 2022 – Mentiste Amanda. (You Lied, Amanda). Short film co-directed with Nuria Muñoz-Ortín.
- 2020 – Nikolina. TV movie, co-directed with Nuria Muñoz-Ortín.
- 2025 – Deaf. feature film
