= European Film Academy Lux Award =

European film award

Lux Award
- The Lux Award statue in 2026
- Location: Europe
- Presented by: European Film Academy
- First award: 1997
- Currently held by: Deaf (2026)
- Website: europeanfilmawards.eu

The European Film Academy Lux Award is a prize given to a competing film by the European Film Academy and the European Parliament. It is one of the European Film Awards, which were established to recognize excellence in European cinematic achievements. Previously known as the People's Choice Award for Best European Film, it was first awarded in 1997 with Peter Cattaneo's film The Full Monty being the first recipient of the award. It was reintroduced as Jameson Award from 2002 to 2005. It changed to its current name in 2020, when the European Parliament became partly responsible for the management of the award, replacing the former Lux Prize.

The award is aimed at highlighting films which help to raise awareness of socio-political issues in Europe and to publicise and encourage distribution of European films in the European Union and throughout the world. As of 2026, Deaf is the most recent winner.

== Winners and nominees ==
=== 1990s ===
Year	English title	Original title	Director(s)	Nationality of director
1997 (10th)	The Full Monty		Peter Cattaneo	United Kingdom

=== 2000s ===
Year	English title	Original title	Director(s)	Nationality of director
2003 (16th)	Good Bye, Lenin!		Wolfgang Becker	Germany
2003 (16th)	28 Days Later		Danny Boyle	United Kingdom
2003 (16th)	Dogville		Lars von Trier	Denmark
2003 (16th)	Mondays in the Sun	Los lunes al sol	Fernando León de Aranoa	Spain
2003 (16th)	Noi the Albino	Nói albinói	Dagur Kári	Iceland
2003 (16th)	The Man on the Train	L'homme du train	Patrice Leconte	France
2003 (16th)	Swimming Pool		François Ozon	France
2003 (16th)	Respiro		Emanuele Crialese	Italy
2003 (16th)	Distant	Uzak	Nuri Bilge Ceylan	Turkey
2003 (16th)	Kitchen Stories	Salmer fra Kjøkkenet	Bent Hamer	Norway
2004 (17th)	Head-On	Gegen die Wand	Fatih Akin	Germany
2004 (17th)	Code 46		Michael Winterbottom	United Kingdom
2004 (17th)	Bad Education	La mala educación	Pedro Almodóvar	Spain
2004 (17th)	Take My Eyes	Te doy mis ojos	Icíar Bollaín	Spain
2004 (17th)	Cold Light	Kaldaljós	Hilmar Oddsson	Iceland
2004 (17th)	Trilogy: The Weeping Meadow	Τριλογία: Το λιβάδι που δακρύζει	Theo Angelopoulos	Greece
2004 (17th)	The Dreamers		Bernardo Bertolucci	Italy
2004 (17th)	Since Otar Left	Depuis qu'Otar est parti...	Julie Bertuccelli	France
2004 (17th)	Love Actually		Richard Curtis	United Kingdom
2004 (17th)	Intimate Strangers	Confidences trop intimes	Patrice Leconte	France
2005 (18th)	Sophie Scholl – The Final Days	Sophie Scholl – Die letzten Tage	Marc Rothemund	Germany
2005 (18th)	Night Watch	Ночной Дозор / Nochnoy Dozor	Timur Bekmambetov	Russia
2005 (18th)	Ferpect Crime	Crimen ferpecto	Álex de la Iglesia	Spain
2005 (18th)	A Very Long Engagement	Un long dimanche de fiançailles	Jean-Pierre Jeunet	France
2005 (18th)	The Beat That My Heart Skipped	De battre mon cœur s'est arrêté	Jacques Audiard	France
2005 (18th)	Enduring Love		Roger Michell	United Kingdom
2005 (18th)	Being Julia		István Szabó	Hungary
2005 (18th)	The Consequences of Love	Le conseguenze dell'amore	Paolo Sorrentino	Italy
2005 (18th)	As It Is in Heaven		Kay Pollak	Sweden
2005 (18th)	Go for Zucker!		Dani Levy	Switzerland
2006 (19th)	Volver		Pedro Almodóvar	Spain
2006 (19th)	March of the Penguins	La Marche de l'empereur	Luc Jacquet	France
2006 (19th)	Pride and Prejudice		Joe Wright	United Kingdom
2006 (19th)	Wallace & Gromit: The Curse of the Were-Rabbit		Nick Park, Steve Box	United Kingdom
2006 (19th)	Something Like Happiness	Štěstí	Bohdan Sláma	Czech Republic
2006 (19th)	Criminal Novel	Romanzo Criminale	Michele Placido	Italy
2006 (19th)	Paradise Now		Hany Abu-Assad	Netherlands
2006 (19th)	Oliver Twist		Roman Polanski	France
2006 (19th)	Merry Christmas	Joyeux Noël	Christian Carion	France
2006 (19th)	The Elementary Particles	Elementarteilchen	Oskar Roehler	Germany
2006 (19th)	Adam's Apples	Adams Æbler	Anders Thomas Jensen	Denmark
2006 (19th)	The Child	L'Enfant	Jean-Pierre and Luc Dardenne	Belgium
2007 (20th)	The Unknown Woman	La sconosciuta	Giuseppe Tornatore	Italy
2007 (20th)	I Served the King of England	Obsluhoval jsem anglického krále	Jiří Menzel	Czech Republic
2007 (20th)	The Last King of Scotland		Kevin Macdonald	United Kingdom
2007 (20th)	Perfume: The Story of a Murderer		Tom Tykwer	Germany
2007 (20th)	12:08 East of Bucharest	A fost sau n-a fost?	Corneliu Porumboiu	Romania
2007 (20th)	The Queen		Stephen Frears	United Kingdom
2007 (20th)	La Vie en Rose	La Môme	Olivier Dahan	France
2007 (20th)	Reprise		Joachim Trier	Norway
2007 (20th)	Black Book	Zwartboek	Paul Verhoeven	Netherlands
2007 (20th)	Alatriste		Agustín Díaz Yanes	Spain
2007 (20th)	2 Days in Paris		Julie Delpy	France
2008 (21st)	Harry Potter and the Order of the Phoenix		David Yates	United Kingdom
2008 (21st)	[REC]		Jaume Balagueró, Paco Plaza	Spain
2008 (21st)	The Orphanage	El orfanato	Juan Antonio Bayona	Spain
2008 (21st)	Mongol: The Rise of Genghis Khan		Sergei Bodrov	Russia
2008 (21st)	Atonement		Joe Wright	United Kingdom
2008 (21st)	Welcome to the Sticks	Bienvenue chez les Ch'tis	Dany Boon	France
2008 (21st)	Hunting and Gathering	Ensemble, c'est tout	Claude Berri	France
2008 (21st)	The Wave	Die Welle	Dennis Gansel	Germany
2008 (21st)	Rabbit Without Ears	Keinohrhasen	Til Schweiger	
2008 (21st)	Ben X		Nic Balthazar	Belgium
2008 (21st)	Arn – The Knight Templar	Arn: Tempelriddaren	Peter Flinth	Denmark
2008 (21st)	Saturn in Opposition	Saturno contro	Ferzan Özpetek	Italy
2009 (22nd)	Slumdog Millionaire		Danny Boyle	United Kingdom
2009 (22nd)	Coco Before Chanel	Coco avant Chanel	Anne Fontaine	France
2009 (22nd)	Transporter 3		Olivier Megaton	France
2009 (22nd)	Mid-August Lunch	Pranzo di ferragosto	Gianni Di Gregorio	Italy
2009 (22nd)	Let the Right One In	Låt den rätte komma in	Tomas Alfredson	Sweden
2009 (22nd)	Fly Me to the Moon		Ben Stassen	Belgium
2009 (22nd)	The Duchess		Saul Dibb	United Kingdom
2009 (22nd)	The Girl with the Dragon Tattoo	Män som hatar kvinnor	Niels Arden Oplev	Denmark
2009 (22nd)	Broken Embraces	Los abrazos rotos	Pedro Almodóvar	Spain
2009 (22nd)	The Baader Meinhof Complex	Der Baader Meinhof Komplex	Uli Edel	Germany

=== 2010s ===
Year	English title	Original title	Director(s)	Nationality of director
2010 (23rd)	Mr. Nobody		Jaco Van Dormael	Belgium
2010 (23rd)	The Girl Who Played with Fire	Flickan som lekte med elden	Daniel Alfredson	Sweden
2010 (23rd)	Soul Kitchen		Fatih Akın	Germany
2010 (23rd)	Loose Cannons		Ferzan Özpetek	Italy
2010 (23rd)	Baarìa		Giuseppe Tornatore	Italy
2010 (23rd)	Little Nicholas	Le Petit Nicolas	Laurent Tirard	France
2010 (23rd)	An Education		Lone Scherfig	Denmark
2010 (23rd)	Kick-Ass		Matthew Vaughn	Denmark
2010 (23rd)	Agora	Ágora	Alejandro Amenábar	Spain
2010 (23rd)	The Ghost Writer		Roman Polanski	France
2011 (24th)	The King's Speech		Tom Hooper	United Kingdom
2011 (24th)	Animals United	Konferenz der Tiere	Reinhard Klooss, Holger Tappe	Germany
2011 (24th)	Even the Rain	También la lluvia	Icíar Bollaín	Spain
2011 (24th)	In a Better World	Hævnen	Susanne Bier	Denmark
2011 (24th)	Little White Lies	Les Petits Mouchoirs	Guillaume Canet	France
2011 (24th)	Welcome to the South	Benvenuti al Sud	Luca Miniero	Italy
2011 (24th)	Potiche		François Ozon	France
2011 (24th)	Unknown		Jaume Collet-Serra	United Kingdom
2012 (25th)	Come as You Are	Hasta la Vista	Geoffrey Enthoven	Belgium
2012 (25th)	The Artist		Michel Hazanavicius	France
2012 (25th)	Barbara		Christian Petzold	Germany
2012 (25th)	The Best Exotic Marigold Hotel		John Madded	United Kingdom
2012 (25th)	Caesar Must Die	Cesare deve morire	Paolo Taviani	Italy
2012 (25th)	Tinker Tailor Soldier Spy		Tomas Alfredson	United Kingdom
2012 (25th)	Headhunters	Hodejegerne	Morten Tyldum	Norway
2012 (25th)	In Darkness	W ciemności	Agnieszka Holland	Poland
2012 (25th)	The Intouchables	Intouchables	Éric Toledano and Olivier Nakache	France
2012 (25th)	The Iron Lady		Phyllida Lloyd	United Kingdom
2012 (25th)	Salmon Fishing in the Yemen		Lasse Hallström	United Kingdom
2012 (25th)	Shame		Steve McQueen	United Kingdom
2013 (26th)	The Gilded Cage	La Cage dorée	Ruben Alves	France, Portugal
2013 (26th)	Anna Karenina		Joe Wright	United Kingdom
2013 (26th)	The Best Offer	La migliore offerta	Giuseppe Tornatore	Italy
2013 (26th)	The Broken Circle Breakdown		Felix Van Groeningen	Belgium
2013 (26th)	A Coffee in Berlin	Oh Boy!	Jan Ole Gerster	Germany
2013 (26th)	The Deep	Djúpið	Baltasar Kormákur	Iceland
2013 (26th)	Love Is All You Need	Den skaldede frisør	Susanne Bier	Denmark
2013 (26th)	I'm So Excited	Los amantes pasajeros	Pedro Almodóvar	Spain
2013 (26th)	The Impossible	Lo imposible	J.A. Bayona	Spain
2013 (26th)	Kon-Tiki		Joachim Rønning, Espen Sandberg	Norway
2013 (26th)	Searching for Sugar Man		Malik Bendjelloul	Sweden
2014 (27th)	Ida		Paweł Pawlikowski	Poland
2014 (27th)	Beauty and the Beast	La Belle et la Bête	Christophe Gans	France
2014 (27th)	Nymphomaniac		Lars von Trier	Denmark
2014 (27th)	Philomena		Stephen Frears	United Kingdom
2014 (27th)	The Hundred-Year-Old Man Who Climbed Out the Window and Disappeared	Hundraåringen som klev ut genom fönstret och försvann	Felix Herngren	Sweden
2014 (27th)	Two Days, One Night	Deux jours, une nuit	Jean-Pierre and Luc Dardenne	Belgium
2015 (28th)
2015 (28th)	Marshland	La isla mínima	Alberto Rodríguez	Spain
2015 (28th)	A Pigeon Sat on a Branch Reflecting on Existence	En duva satt på en gren och funderade på tillvaron	Roy Andersson	Sweden
2015 (28th)	Leviathan	Левиафан / Leviafan	Andrey Zvyagintsev	Russia
2015 (28th)	Force Majeure	Turist	Ruben Östlund	Sweden
2015 (28th)	Samba		Éric Toledano and Olivier Nakache	France
2015 (28th)	Serial (Bad) Weddings	Qu'est-ce qu'on a fait au Bon Dieu?	Philippe de Chauveron	France
2015 (28th)	The Salt of the Earth	Le sel de la terre	Wim Wenders, Juliano Ribeiro Salgado	France
2015 (28th)	The Imitation Game		Morten Tyldum	United Kingdom
2015 (28th)	Victoria		Sebastian Schipper	Germany
2015 (28th)	White God	Fehér isten	Kornél Mundruczó	Hungary
2016 (29th)
2016 (29th)	Body	Ciało	Małgorzata Szumowska	Poland
2016 (29th)	A Man Called Ove	En man som heter Ove	Hannes Holm	Sweden
2016 (29th)	A War	Krigen	Tobias Lindholm	Denmark
2016 (29th)	Aferim!		Radu Jude	Romania
2016 (29th)	Fire at Sea	Fuocoammare	Gianfranco Rosi	Italy
2016 (29th)	Julieta		Pedro Almodóvar	Spain
2016 (29th)	Mustang		Deniz Gamze Ergüven	France
2016 (29th)	Spectre		Sam Mendes	United Kingdom
2016 (29th)	The Danish Girl		Tom Hooper	United Kingdom
2016 (29th)	The Brand New Testament	Le Tout Nouveau Testament	Jaco Van Dormael	Belgium
2016 (29th)	The High Sun	Zvizdan	Dalibor Matanić	Croatia
2016 (29th)	The Lobster		Yorgos Lanthimos	United Kingdom
2017 (30th)
2017 (30th)	Stefan Zweig: Farewell to Europe	Vor der Morgenröte	Maria Schrader	Germany
2017 (30th)	A Monster Calls		J. A. Bayona	Spain
2017 (30th)	Bridget Jones's Baby		Sharon Maguire	Ireland
2017 (30th)	Frantz		François Ozon	France
2017 (30th)	Fantastic Beasts and Where to Find Them		David Yates	United Kingdom
2017 (30th)	Graduation	Bacalaureat	Cristian Mungiu	Romania
2017 (30th)	Like Crazy	La pazza gioia	Paolo Virzì	Italy
2017 (30th)	The Commune	Kollektivet	Thomas Vinterberg	Denmark
2017 (30th)	The Other Side of Hope	Toivon tuolla puolen	Aki Kaurismäki	Finland
2018 (31st)
2018 (31st)	Call Me by Your Name		Luca Guadagnino	Italy
2018 (31st)	Borg vs McEnroe	Borg	Janus Metz Pedersen	Sweden
2018 (31st)	Dunkirk		Christopher Nolan	United Kingdom
2018 (31st)	C'est la vie!	Le Sens de la fête	Éric Toledano and Olivier Nakache	France
2018 (31st)	Valerian and the City of a Thousand Planets		Luc Besson	France
2018 (31st)	Darkest Hour		Joe Wright	United Kingdom
2018 (31st)	Victoria & Abdul		Stephen Frears	United Kingdom
2018 (31st)	In the Fade	Aus dem Nichts	Fatih Akin	Germany
2018 (31st)	The Death of Stalin		Armando Iannucci	United Kingdom
2019 (32nd)
2019 (32nd)	Cold War	Zimna wojna	Paweł Pawlikowski	Poland
2019 (32nd)	Border	Gräns	Ali Abbasi	Sweden
2019 (32nd)	Dogman		Matteo Garrone	Italy
2019 (32nd)	Fantastic Beasts: The Crimes of Grindelwald		David Yates	United Kingdom
2019 (32nd)	Girl		Lukas Dhont	Belgium
2019 (32nd)	Happy as Lazzaro	Lazzaro felice	Alice Rohrwacher	Italy
2019 (32nd)	Mamma Mia! Here We Go Again		Ol Parker	United Kingdom
2019 (32nd)	Pain and Glory	Dolor y gloria	Pedro Almodóvar	Spain
2019 (32nd)	Sink or Swim	Le Grand Bain	Gilles Lellouche	France
2019 (32nd)	The Breadwinner		Nora Twomey	Ireland
2019 (32nd)	The Favourite		Yorgos Lanthimos	United Kingdom
2019 (32nd)	The Purity of Vengeance Journal 64		Christoffer Boe	Denmark

=== 2020s ===
Year	English title	Original title	Director(s)	Nationality of director
2021 (33rd)
2021 (33rd)	Collective		Alexander Nanau	Romania
2021 (33rd)	Another Round	Druk	Thomas Vinterberg	Denmark
2021 (33rd)	Corpus Christi		Jan Komasa	Poland
2022 (34th)
2022 (34th)	Quo Vadis, Aida?		Jasmila Žbanić	Bosnia and Herzegovina
2022 (34th)	Flee	Flugt	Jonas Poher Rasmussen	Denmark
2022 (34th)	Great Freedom	Große Freiheit	Sebastian Meise	Austria
2023 (35th)
2023 (35th)	Close		Lukas Dhont	Belgium
2023 (35th)	Alcarràs		Carla Simón	Spain
2023 (35th)	Burning Days	Kurak Günler	Emin Alper	Turkey
2023 (35th)	Triangle of Sadness		Ruben Östlund	Sweden
2023 (35th)	Will-o'-the-Wisp	Fogo-Fátuo	João Pedro Rodrigues	Portugal
2024 (36th)
2024 (36th)	The Teachers' Lounge	Das Lehrerzimmer	İlker Çatak	Germany
2024 (36th)	20,000 Species of Bees	20.000 especies de abejas	Estibaliz Urresola Solaguren	Spain
2024 (36th)	Fallen Leaves	Kuolleet lehdet	Aki Kaurismäki	Finland
2024 (36th)	On the Adamant	Sur l'Adamant	Nicolas Philibert	France
2024 (36th)	Smoke Sauna Sisterhood	Savvusanna sõsarad	Anna Hints	Estonia
2025 (37th)
2025 (37th)	Flow	Straume	Gints Zilbalodis	Latvia
2025 (37th)	Animal		Sofia Exarchou	Greece
2025 (37th)	Dahomey		Mati Diop	France
2025 (37th)	Intercepted		Oksana Karpovych	Ukraine
2025 (37th)	Julie Keeps Quiet	Julie zwijgt	Leonardo Van Dijl	Belgium
2026 (38th)
2026 (38th)	Deaf	Sorda	Eva Libertad	Spain
2026 (38th)	Christy		Brendan Canty	Ireland
2026 (38th)	It Was Just an Accident	یک تصادف ساده	Jafar Panahi	Iran
2026 (38th)	Love Me Tender		Anna Cazenave Cambet	France
2026 (38th)	Sentimental Value	Affeksjonsverdi	Joachim Trier	Norway

== See also ==
- Lux Prize
