= 1993 Madrid bombings =

Terrorist incident in Spain

1993 Madrid bombing
- Part of the Basque conflict
- Location: Madrid, Spain
- Date: 21 June 1993; 0815 (UTC+2)
- Target: Army lorry
- Attack type: car bomb
- Deaths: 7
- Injuries: 29
- Perpetrator: ETA

The 1993 Madrid bombings were a coordinated attack of two car bombs by the armed Basque separatist group Euskadi Ta Askatasuna (ETA) in Madrid, Spain on 21 June 1993, killing 7 people and injuring a further 29. The target was an army vehicle transporting members of the army, killing six military passengers and the civilian driver. This was the deadliest attack of 1993 attributed to ETA.

== Background ==
Prior to these attacks, ETA carried out multiple, high-profile bombings, including the Plaza República Dominicana bombing in July 1986, which killed 12 members of the Spanish Civil Guard. Earlier attacks in Madrid included the February 1992 bombing that killed four military personnel among others.

The bombing occurred 15 days after the Spanish general election amid coalition government negotiations. The attacks were seen as a response to recent setbacks for ETA, including the poor electoral performance of its political wing, Herri Batasuna, and the imprisonment of key ETA leaders in France.

== The attacks ==
The first and main attack took place at 8:15 a.m. on Joaquín Costa Street near Glorieta López de Hoyos. A parked car containing 40 kilograms of explosives detonated as an unmarked military van passed by, killing seven; four lieutenant colonels, a commander, a sergeant and the civilian driver of the vehicle. The explosion injured 22 others, including children, and caused significant structural damage to 14 buildings, displacing 90 families.

An hour later, a second bomb exploded on Serrano Street, near the American and French embassies. The car, a red Ford, contained 4 to 5 kilograms of explosives and had been parked shortly before detonation. This blast injured three people, including children waiting for a school bus.

== Reactions ==
The attack was condemned by all the main Spanish political parties and led to the King of Spain cancelling his participation in the Centre of Defense Studies. In the Basque Country, a five-minute break in the working day in memory of the victims was organised. The Spanish Ministry of the Interior blamed the attacks on ETA's Madrid commando, which had been reconstituted in 1991. Police sources identified María Soledad Iparraguirre, alias "Anboto" or "Marisol", as one of those involved in the attack. Anboto was arrested in France in October 2004 and in December 2010 was sentenced to 20 years in prison.

== Later investigation ==
In 2013, on the eve of the expiration of the case's statute of limitations, journalist Pablo Romero – son of lieutenant colonel Juan Romero Alvárez, one of the victims of the 1993 attack – began a new investigation of the case after discovering a new clue while re-reading the eight tomes that made up the case file. The new clue led Spain's National Court to reopen its own investigation and summon convicted terrorist Jesús García Corporales as a formal suspect.

Romero's investigation became the subject of a series of special reports published in El Español in 2013 in which he indicated that members of ETA's Madrid cell were directly responsible for the attack, and where he also highlighted how the Spanish State had neglected to do its part both in preventing the bombing and later pursuing guilty parties. In 2018, Romero turned the story into a podcast, My Father's Three Deaths, which received the 2018 Ondas Award, one of Spain's most prestigious journalism prizes.
