= María Soledad Iparraguirre =

Spanish Basque ETA activist

María Soledad Iparraguirre Guenechea
- Born: April 25, 1961 (age 64)
- Other names: Marisol; Anboto
- Organization: ETA
- Criminal charge: Directing and financing terrorism
- Criminal penalty: 20 years in prison

María Soledad Iparraguirre Guenechea (born Eskoriatza, 25 April 1961), known as "Marisol" until 1994 and "Anboto" thereafter, was a senior figure in the Basque separatist group ETA and the second woman, after Dolores González Cataráin (alias "Yoyes"), to be a member of ETA's executive. Arrested in October 2004, in December 2010 she was sentenced by French courts to 20 years in prison. On May 3, 2018, she, together with Josu Urrutikoetxea, voiced the final statement with which the organization announced its dissolution.

== Early life ==
When Iparraguirre was a child, her family ran safe houses for ETA. As a teenager in the late 1970s, she joined the Vizcaya unit of ETA, working mainly as a courier for the group. When Iparraguirre was 20, police raided her family home and found 8,000 kg (18,000 lb) of dynamite brought from France. During the operation her boyfriend José Manuel Aristimuño, alias "Pana", was killed, while her father fled to France. At the time, she was studying to become a teacher. Though arrested by police during this operation, she was released and fled to France. After her lover's death she became more actively involved in ETA, going on to become one of its "bloodiest" members.

== 1980s ==
After a year of ETA training in France, she recrossed the border in 1985 as a member of the Araba commando unit. In her first action, in March 1985, she is said to have attacked police and a television crew with a machine gun near a sports centre in Vitoria-Gasteiz. Active alongside José Javier Arizcuren, Juan Carlos Arruti, and Eusebio Arzalluz, in the three years to 1987 she is believed by the police to have been involved in six killings in the Basque country, of postman Estanislao Galíndez, civil guardsman Fernando Amo, and police officers Félix Gallego, Manuel Fuentes, Antonio Ligero, and Rafael Mircientes. After the destruction of her cell in a gun fight on the border, she crossed back into France.

== 1990s ==
Iparraguirre is understood to have joined ETA's Madrid commando unit in the early 1990s and documents discovered by police in 1992 suggest that she was in charge of ETA's "legal commandos" (i.e. those without police records). Police sources of the time describe her as "elegant and good looking", noting also that she frequented "the trendy spots of the capital in fine clothing". In 1992 she narrowly escaped arrest, fleeing to France where she abandoned guns and a car bomb. She is believed to have been involved in eight further killings within the space of two years, namely, of second lieutenant Miguel Mirando, and of seven members of the Spanish Armed Forces in a car bombing in Madrid. After 1993, with her wanted poster prominent on public buildings, she lived and operated from France. According to the subsequent testimony of ETA prisoners, in this period she was involved in the recruitment, training and indoctrination of new members, setting their objectives and providing weapons and money. She is also thought to have been involved in the attempted assassination of King Juan Carlos in 1997.

== ETA leadership role ==
In 2000 she became the only female member of ETA's central committee, the second to hold such a position, and one of four people in charge of ETA's military operations. At the same time her lover was in charge of the political wing. Security agents of the Ministry of the Interior believe she was a leading contender to assume overall leadership of ETA in September that year, after the arrest of Ignacio Gracia Arregui, Inaki de Renteria.

In February 2002, at the request of the Spanish government, Iparraguirre was one of 21 people with connections to ETA added to the US Treasury's list of terrorist financiers. She was accused of being responsible for the collection of ETA's "revolutionary tax", used to fund the group.

== Arrest, trial and imprisonment ==
Iparraguirre was arrested by police in Salies-de-Béarn near Pau in south-west France in a police operation on 3 October 2004. She was arrested together with her partner Mikel Albizu Iriarte, known as "Antza", and their child. Although they were in possession of false papers and refused to answer questions, police were able to identify the pair by examining their fingerprints. The operation led to the arrest of twenty ETA members, captured in a series of seven raids which also permitted the seizure of a large cache of weapons, which included 900 lb (410 kg) of explosives, grenade launchers, and two Russian made SAM-7 surface-to-air missiles. At the time of her arrest, Iparraguirre was wanted by Spanish police for her involvement in at least 14 killings.

On 16 December 2010, French courts sentenced both to 20 years in prison for directing and financing terrorism; after serving their sentences, they will be deported to Spain.

In April 2012, the ETA prisoners' association EPPK, endorsing a peaceful negotiated settlement to the Basque conflict, nominated Iparraguirrea, together with her partner Antza, as two of the six prisoners delegated to represent the organization in any future negotiations which might possibly take place between ETA and the governments of Spain and France.
