= Deaf (film) =

2025 Spanish drama film

- Theatrical release poster
- Spanish: Sorda
- Directed by: Eva Libertad
- Screenplay by: Eva Libertad
- Produced by: Miriam Porté; Nuria Muñoz Ortín; Adolfo Blanco
- Starring: Miriam Garlo; Álvaro Cervantes; Elena Irureta; Joaquín Notario
- Cinematography: Gina Ferrer
- Edited by: Marta Velasco
- Music by: Aránzazu Calleja
- Production companies: Distinto Films; Nexus CreaFilms; A Contracorriente Films
- Distributed by: A Contracorriente Films
- Release dates: 15 February 2025 (Berlinale); 4 April 2025 (Spain)
- Running time: 99 minutes
- Country: Spain
- Languages: Spanish; Spanish Sign Language

Deaf (Spanish: Sorda) is a 2025 Spanish drama film written and directed by Eva Libertad, a continuation of the 2023 Goya Award-nominated short film of the same name co-directed by Libertad, that starred Libertad's sister Miriam Garlo. This feature-length film stars deaf actress Garlo along with Álvaro Cervantes, Elena Irureta, and Joaquín Notario. It follows Ángela, a deaf woman, who is expecting a child with her hearing partner, Héctor.

The film had its premiere at the 75th Berlin International Film Festival on 15 February 2025, where it won the Panorama Audience Award for Best Feature Film. After a Golden Biznaga-winning run at the 28th Málaga Film Festival in March 2025, it was released in Spanish theaters on 4 April 2025 by A Contracorriente Films. It won Best New Director, Best New Actress (Garlo), and Best Supporting Actor (Cervantes) at the 40th Goya Awards.

== Synopsis ==
Ángela, a deaf woman working in a pottery studio in rural Spain, is expecting a baby with her hearing partner, Héctor. The pregnancy stirs up her anxieties about motherhood and her ability to communicate with her daughter. The birth of the baby girl triggers a crisis for the couple, as Ángela navigates raising her daughter in a world that does not cater to her needs.

== Cast ==
- Miriam Garlo as Ángela
- Álvaro Cervantes as Héctor
- Elena Irureta as Elvira
- Joaquín Notario as Fede

== Production ==
The film, written and directed by Eva Libertad, stars deaf actress Miriam Garlo, who also featured in the 37th Goya Awards nominated short film of the same name, with Álvaro Cervantes, Elena Irureta, and Joaquín Notario. It was produced by Miriam Porté for Distinto Films, Nuria Muñoz Ortín for Nexus CreaFilms and Amalia Blanco for A Contracorriente Films. The film is a collaboration between RTVE, Movistar Plus+, and 7TV Región of Murcia, and will be distributed in Spanish cinemas by A Contracorriente Films. It was filmed in Murcia over six weeks in June and July 2024.

== Release ==
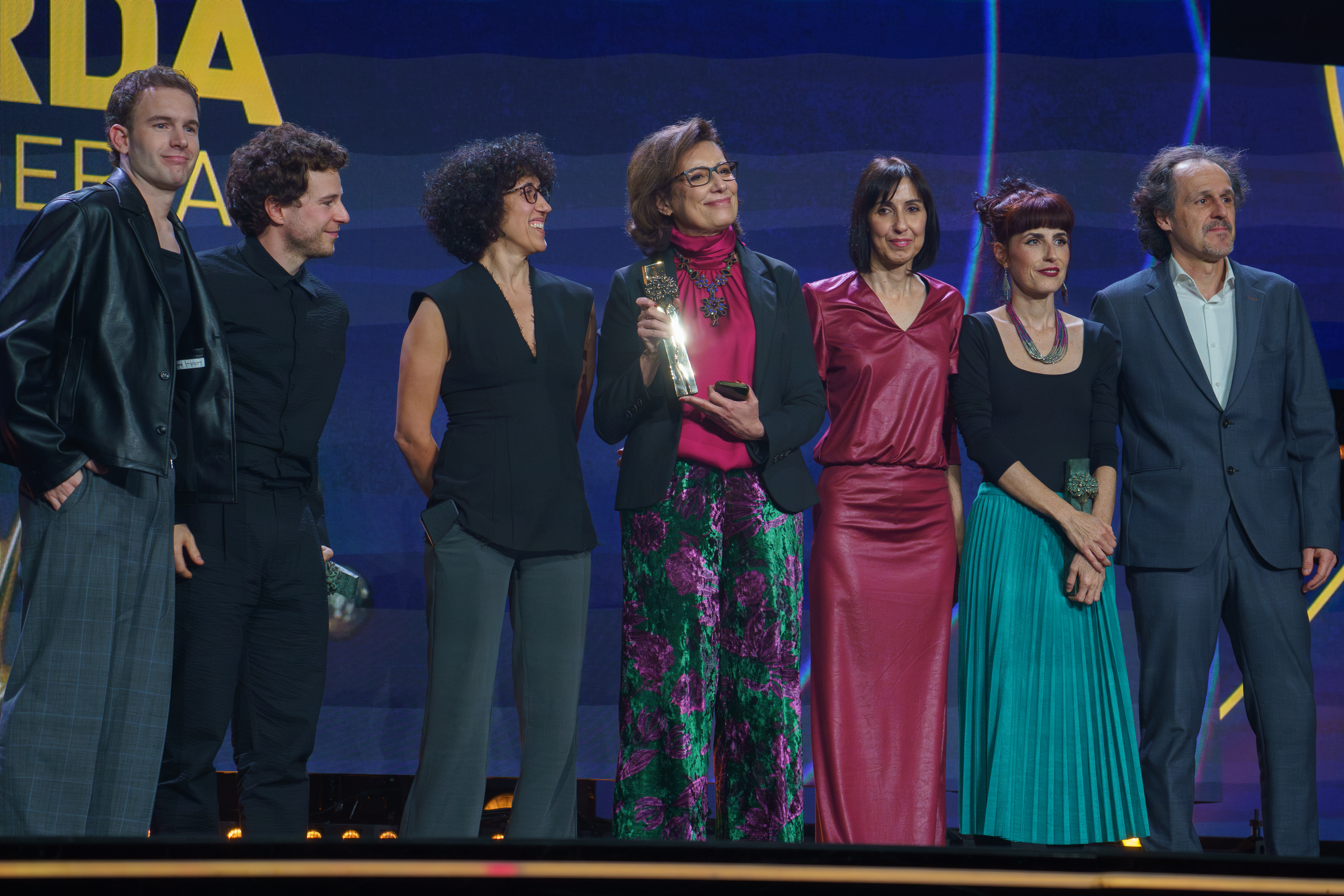
The Deaf team receiving an award at the 28th Málaga Film Festival.

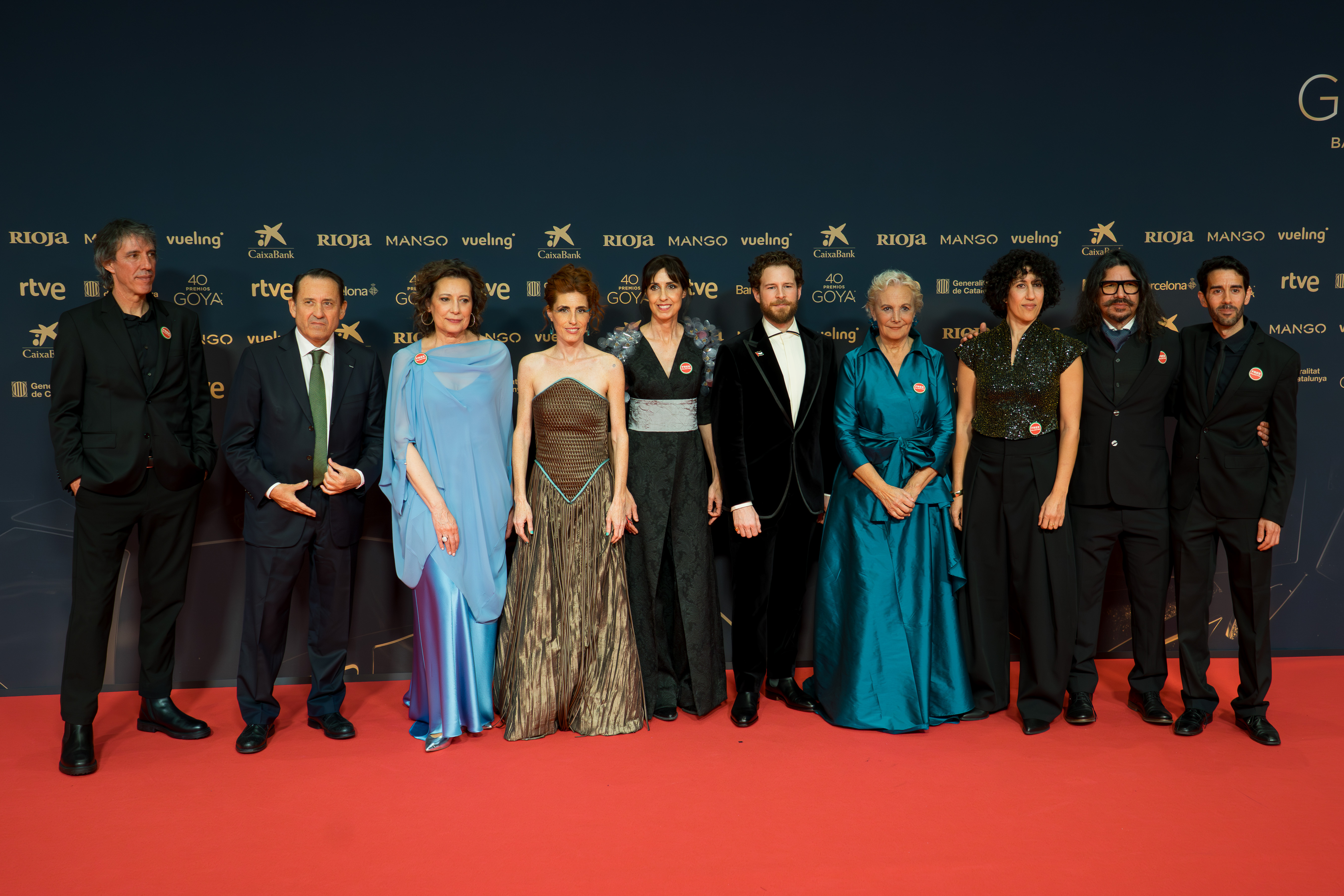
The Deaf team attending the 40th Goya Awards.

Deaf had its world premiere in the Panorama section of the 75th Berlin International Film Festival on 15 February 2025.

In December 2024, Spain's Latido Films acquired the marketing rights of the film. It closed distribution deals in the European territories of France (Condor Distribution), Germany and Austria (Piffl Medien), Italy (Lucky Red), the United Kingdom and Ireland (Curzon), the Benelux (CineArt), Switzerland (Agora), Portugal (Outsider), Greece (Feelgood Entertainment), and the Czech Republic and Slovakia (Association of Czech Film Clubs). Rights were also acquired in China (Wise Media), Australia (Madman), Indonesia (Falcon), Israel (Lev Cinemas), and Japan (New Select).

The film was presented on 15 March 2025 at the 28th Málaga Film Festival, in competition for the Golden Biznaga for Best Spanish Film.

The film was released in Spanish theaters on 4 April 2025 by A Contracorriente Films. Its festival run also included selections for screenings at the 2025 Seattle International Film Festival ('Ibero-American competition' slate), the 72nd Sydney Film Festival, the 40th Guadalajara International Film Festival (Ibero-American Feature section), the Mediterranean Film Festival Split, the Transilvania Film Festival, and the 29th Lima Film Festival as opening film. The film was also part of Horizon section of the 59th Karlovy Vary International Film Festival, where it was screened from 4 July to 12 July 2025.

Curzon programmed a release at 30 locations in the United Kingdom/Ireland market for 12 September 2025.

The film was presented in the Made in Spain section at the 73rd San Sebastián International Film Festival on 21 September 2025.

It had its Australian premiere as part of the feature fiction section at the Adelaide Film Festival on 17 October 2025. Tulip Pictures programmed a theatrical release in Mexico for 6 November 2025.

On 8 November 2025, it was presented in the European Discoveries section of Arras Film Festival.

The film was programmed in the New Voices New Visions section of the 37th Palm Springs International Film Festival for its California Premiere on 3 January 2026.

== Reception ==
=== Critical response ===
On the review aggregator website Rotten Tomatoes, 100% of 15 critics' reviews are positive, with an average rating of 8.2/10.

Jonathan Holland of ScreenDaily assessed that the film "authentically explores the challenges faced by deaf individuals in a hearing world".

Víctor A. Gómez of La Opinión de Málaga welcomed how the film "achieves what it sets out to do without [cheap] emotional low blows or looking like a triptych from a regional ministry of social affairs ".

Andrea G. Bermejo of Cinemanía rated the film 5 out of 5 stars, writing that as the story becomes universal, Deaf turns into "a film about the terrible, deep and secret fears that come with motherhood".

Juan Pando of Fotogramas rated Deaf 4 out of 5 stars, highlighting "the fresh and natural tone chosen in the narration" as the best thing about the film.

Leslie Felperin of The Guardian rated the film 4 out of 5 stars, stating that it "becomes a bang-on illustration of how cinema can be an engine for empathy".

In September 2025, the Academy of Cinematographic Arts and Sciences of Spain included the film in the shortlist of three candidate films to represent Spain in the Best International Film category of the 98th Academy Awards. Likewise, Deaf was shortlisted within the selection of five finalists vying for the Lux Audience Award, presented by the European Parliament and the European Film Academy.

=== Accolades ===
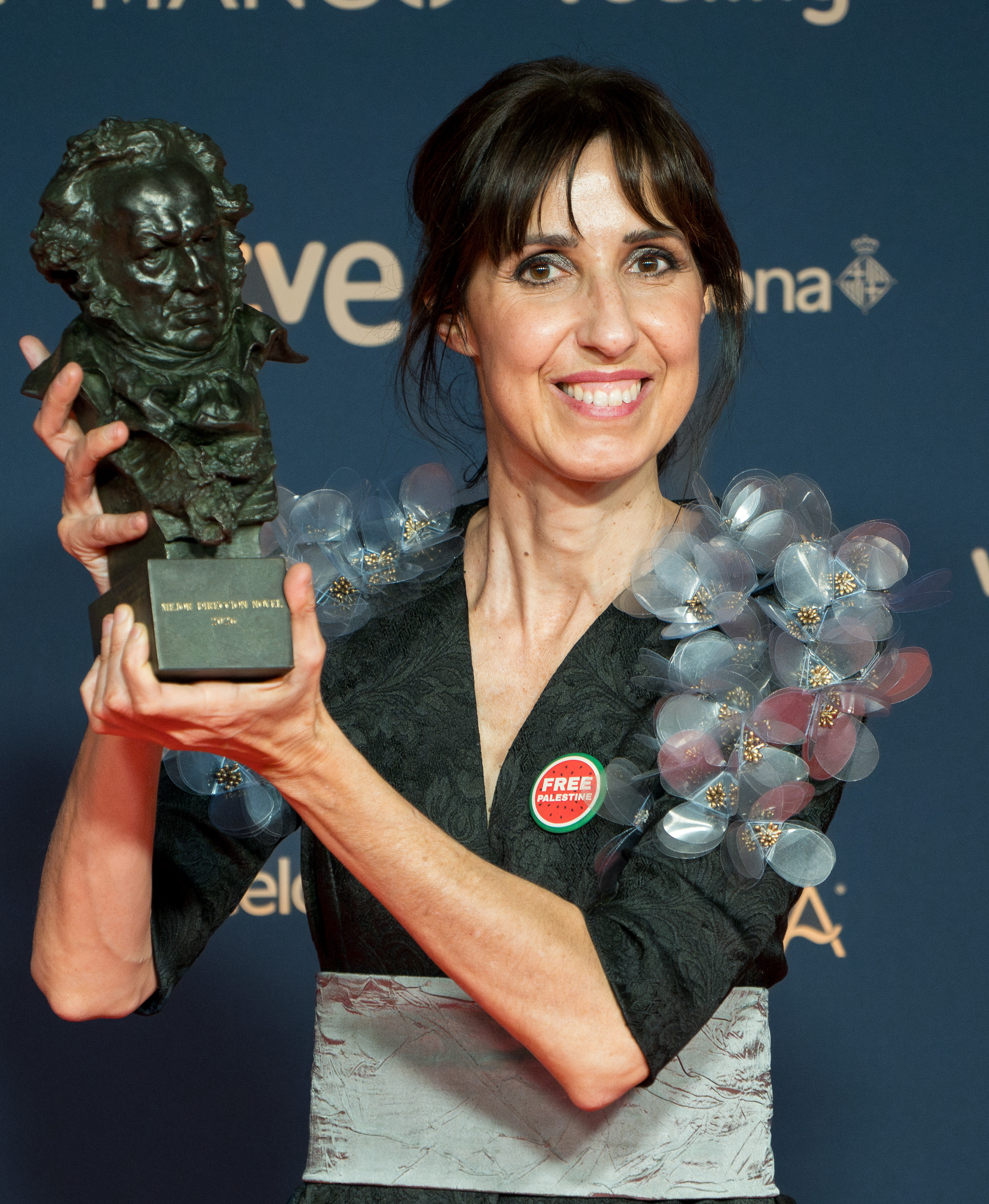
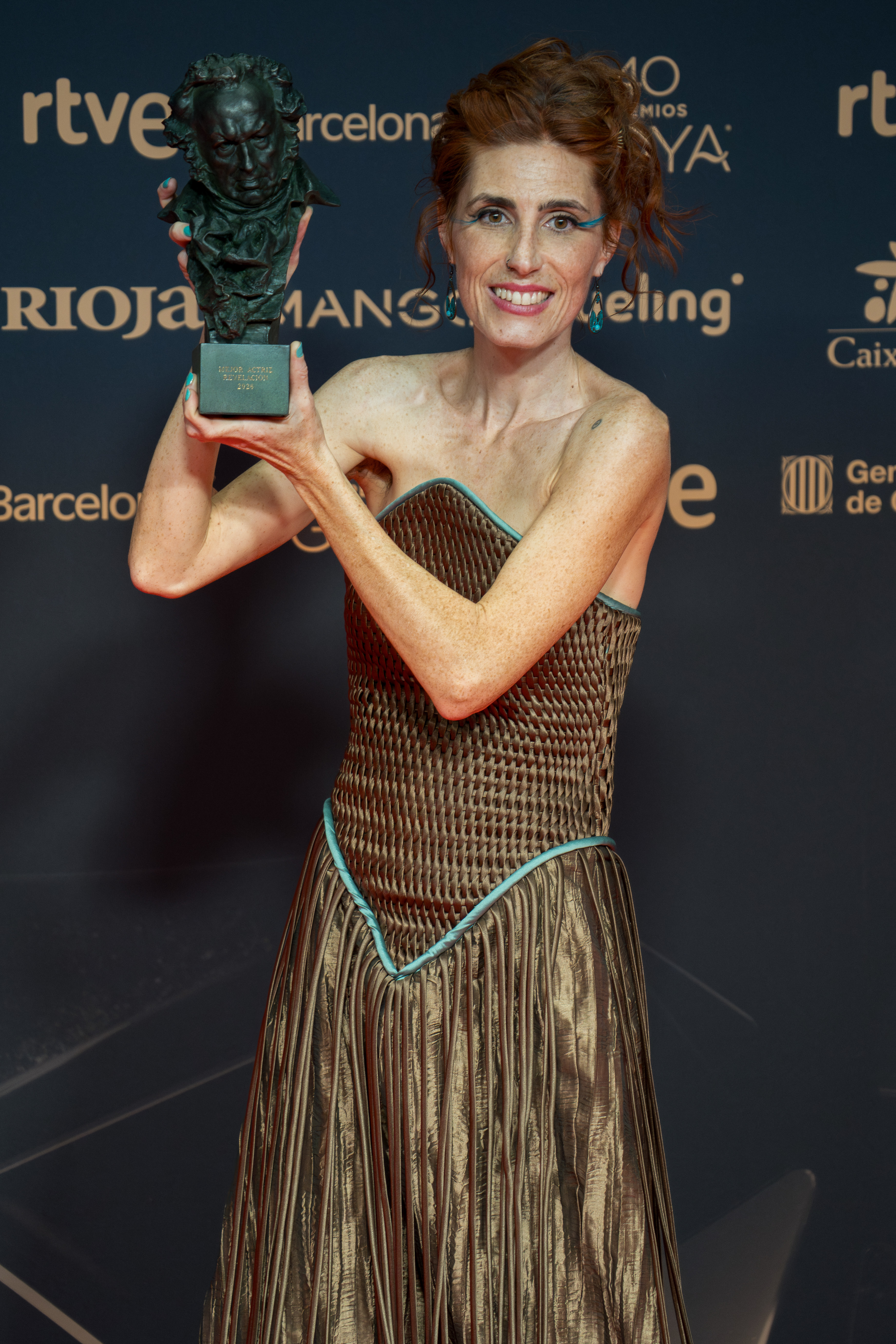
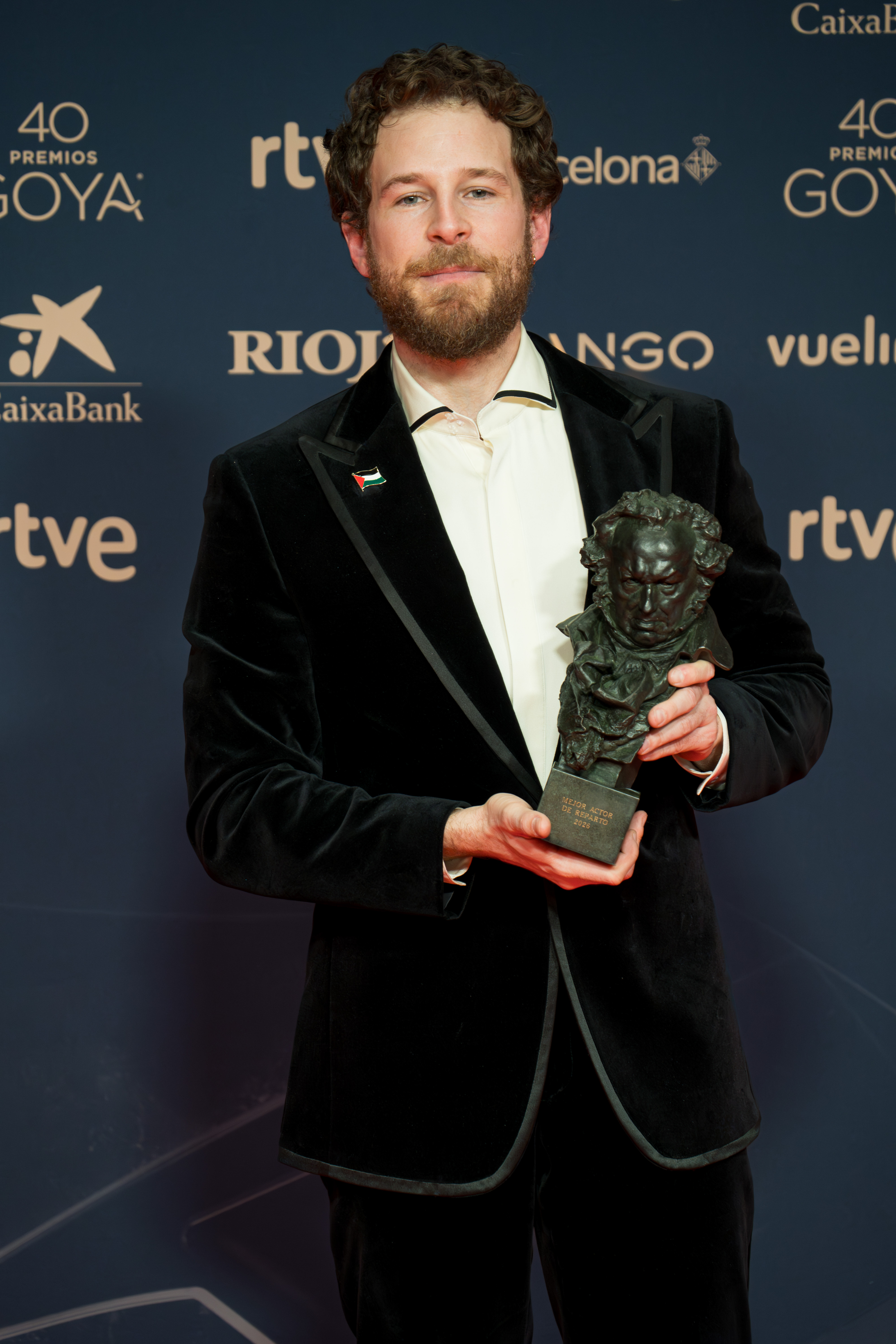
From top to bottom, Libertad, Garlo, and Cervantes holding, respectively, their Goya awards for Best New Director, Best New Actress, and Best Supporting Actor

Award	Date	Category	Recipient	Result	Ref.
Berlin International Film Festival	23 February 2025	Panorama Audience Award for Best Feature Film	Eva Libertad	Won	
Berlin International Film Festival	23 February 2025	CICAE Art Cinema Award	Deaf	Won	
Málaga Film Festival	22 March 2025	Golden Biznaga for Best Spanish Film	Deaf	Won	
Málaga Film Festival	22 March 2025	Silver Biznaga for Best Actress	Miriam Garlo	Won	
Málaga Film Festival	22 March 2025	Silver Biznaga for Best Actor	Álvaro Cervantes	Won	
Málaga Film Festival	22 March 2025	Silver Biznaga, Audience Award (Competition)	Deaf	Won	
Málaga Film Festival	22 March 2025	Feroz Puerta Oscura Award	Deaf	Won	
Málaga Film Festival	22 March 2025	ASECAN - Best Feature Film Debut	Deaf	Won	
Seattle International Film Festival	25 May 2025	Ibero-American Competition Grand Jury Prize	Deaf	Won	
Guadalajara International Film Festival	9–14 June 2025	Latin American Critics' Award for European Films	Deaf	Won	
Guadalajara International Film Festival	9–14 June 2025	Best Director (Ibero-American Fiction Film competition)	Eva Libertad	Won	
Mediterranean Film Festival Split	21 June 2025	Best Feature Film	Eva Libertad	Won	
Forqué Awards	13 December 2025	Best Film	Deaf	Nominated	
Forqué Awards	13 December 2025	Best Actress in a Film	Miriam Garlo	Nominated	
Forqué Awards	13 December 2025	Best Actor in a Film	Álvaro Cervantes	Nominated	
Forqué Awards	13 December 2025	Cinema and Education in Values	Deaf	Won	
Feroz Awards	24 January 2026	Best Drama Film	Deaf	Nominated	
Feroz Awards	24 January 2026	Best Director	Eva Libertad	Nominated	
Feroz Awards	24 January 2026	Best Screenplay	Eva Libertad	Nominated	
Feroz Awards	24 January 2026	Best Main Actress in a Film	Miriam Garlo	Nominated	
Feroz Awards	24 January 2026	Best Main Actor in a Film	Álvaro Cervantes	Nominated	
Feroz Awards	24 January 2026	Best Supporting Actress in a Film	Elena Irureta	Nominated	
Carmen Awards	31 January 2026	Best Non-Andalusian Produced Film	Deaf	Nominated	
Gaudí Awards	8 February 2026	Best Non-Catalan Language Film	Deaf	Nominated	
Gaudí Awards	8 February 2026	Best Director	Eva Libertad	Won	
Gaudí Awards	8 February 2026	Best Adapted Screenplay	Eva Libertad	Won	
Gaudí Awards	8 February 2026	Best Actress	Miriam Garlo	Nominated	
Gaudí Awards	8 February 2026	Best Supporting Actress	Elena Irureta	Nominated	
Gaudí Awards	8 February 2026	Best Supporting Actor	Álvaro Cervantes	Won	
Gaudí Awards	8 February 2026	Best Production Supervision	Goretti Pagès	Nominated	
Gaudí Awards	8 February 2026	Best Art Direction	Anna Auquer	Nominated	
Gaudí Awards	8 February 2026	Best Costume Design	Désirée Guirao, Angélica Muñoz	Nominated	
Gaudí Awards	8 February 2026	Best Sound	Urko Garai, Enrique G. Bermejo, Alejandro Castillo	Nominated	
CEC Medals	23 February 2026	Best Film	Deaf	Nominated	
CEC Medals	23 February 2026	Best New Director	Eva Libertad	Won	
CEC Medals	23 February 2026	Best Adapted Screenplay	Eva Libertad	Won	
CEC Medals	23 February 2026	Best Supporting Actor	Álvaro Cervantes	Won	
CEC Medals	23 February 2026	Best Supporting Actress	Elena Irureta	Nominated	
CEC Medals	23 February 2026	Best New Actress	Miriam Garlo	Nominated	
CEC Medals	23 February 2026	Best Editing	Marta Velasco	Nominated	
Goya Awards	28 February 2026	Best Film	Deaf	Nominated	
Goya Awards	28 February 2026	Best New Director	Eva Libertad	Won	
Goya Awards	28 February 2026	Best Adapted Screenplay	Eva Libertad	Nominated	
Goya Awards	28 February 2026	Best New Actress	Miriam Garlo	Won	
Goya Awards	28 February 2026	Best Supporting Actor	Álvaro Cervantes	Won	
Goya Awards	28 February 2026	Best Supporting Actress	Elena Irureta	Nominated	
Goya Awards	28 February 2026	Best Sound	Urko Garai, Enrique G. Bermejo, Alejandro Castillo	Nominated	
Actors and Actresses Union Awards	16 March 2026	Best Film Actor in a Secondary Role	Álvaro Cervantes	Won	
Actors and Actresses Union Awards	16 March 2026	Best Film Actress in a Secondary Role	Elena Irureta	Nominated	
Actors and Actresses Union Awards	16 March 2026	Best New Actress	Miriam Garlo	Won	
ALMA Awards	26 March 2026	Best Screenplay in a Drama Film	Eva Libertad	Nominated	
European Film Awards	14 April 2026	Lux Award	Eva Libertad	Won	
Platino Awards	9 May 2026	Best Ibero-American Debut Film		Won	
Platino Awards	9 May 2026	Best Supporting Actor	Álvaro Cervantes	Won	
Platino Awards	9 May 2026	Best Sound	Urko Garai, Enrique G. Bermejo, Alejandro Castillo	Nominated	
Platino Awards	9 May 2026	Film and Values Education		Nominated	

== See also ==
- List of Spanish films of 2025
