= Miriam Garlo =

Spanish actress (born 1984)

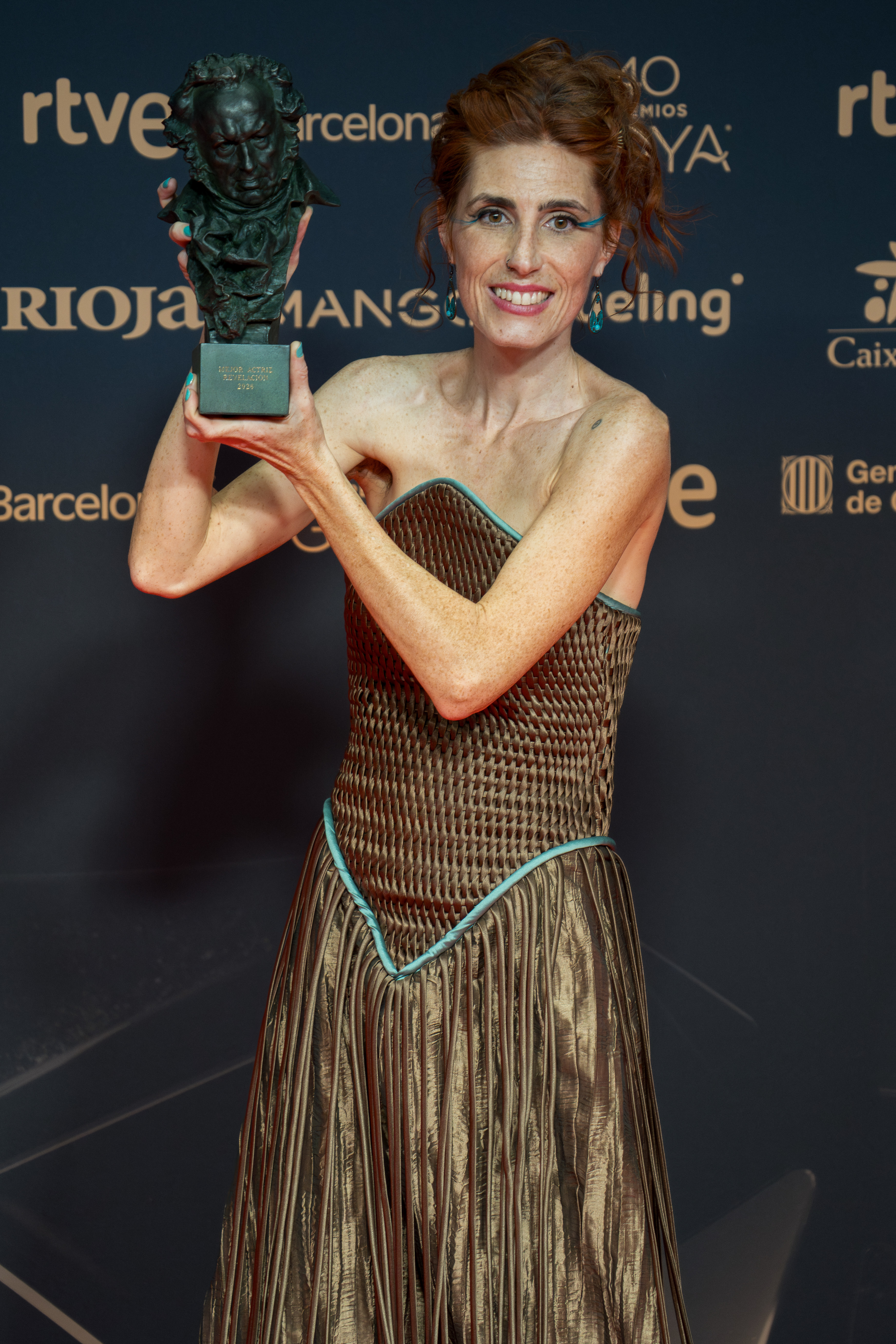
- Miriam Garlo in 2026 at Red Carpet of 40th Goya Awards in Barcelona
- Born: 29 November 1984 (age 41); Molina de Segura, Region of Murcia, Spain
- Known for: Deaf
- Title: Actress

Miriam García López (born 29 November 1984), also known as Miriam Garlo is a Spanish Deaf academic, artist, and actress. She is known for playing the main character in the 2025 film Deaf.

== Life and career ==
Garlo was born on 29 November 1984 in Molina de Segura, in the Region of Murcia. She became deaf at the age of seven following an allergic reaction to aspirin, losing 70% of her hearing, which later increased to 90%. She has a doctorate in Fine Arts from the Complutense University of Madrid, and holds a Master's degree in Art, Research, and Creation. Garlo learned sign language when she was 30. Director Eva Libertad is her sister.

Garlo played the main role of Ángela in the 2025 film Deaf (originally released in Spanish as Sorda), which was directed by her sister Eva Libertad. She had previously played the same role in the 18-minute short film of the same name, which the 2025 film was expanded from.

== Awards ==
Year	Film	Presenter	Award	Result	Reference
2025	Deaf	28th Málaga Film Festival	Best Actress	Won	
2026	Deaf	40th Goya Awards	Best New Actress	Won	
2026	Deaf	13th Feroz Awards	Best Main Actress in a Film	Nominated	
2026	Deaf	18th Gaudí Awards	Best Actress	Nominated	
