= La Casa Azul (band) =

Spanish indie pop band

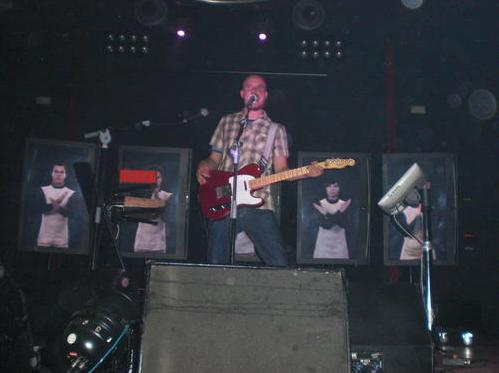
- Guille Milkyway at a performance.

Background information
- Origin: Barcelona
- Genres: Indie pop Disco; Shibuya-kei; Electronic Music; Funk; Soul; Europop; Synthpop; Bubblegum Pop; Sunshine Pop; Doo wop
- Years active: 1997–present
- Labels: Elefant Records (Spain); Happy Robot (South Korea)
- Members: Guille Milkyway; David; Virginia; Sergio; Clara; Óscar
- Website: facebook.com/lacasaazulBCN

La Casa Azul (English: The Blue House) is a Spanish indie pop band that combines many of the qualities of 1960s American pop bands like the Beach Boys and 1970s European disco-pop acts like ABBA with clean, clear production reminiscent of Shibuya-kei. This distinctive sound was created by singer and producer Guille Milkyway, who also writes the band's songs. La Casa Azul release their records on the indie-pop label Elefant.

== Discography ==
=== Singles ===
- "Como Un Fan" CD (Elefant, 2005).

=== Albums ===
- El sonido efervescente de la casa azul EP 10"/CD (Elefant, 2000)
- Milkyway CD (Elefant, 2002)
- Tan simple como el amor LP 12"/CD (Elefant, 2003)
- El sonido efervescente de la casa azul (expanded release) CD (Elefant, 2006)
- La revolución sexual LP 12"/CD (Elefant, 2007)
- La nueva Yma Sumac (lo que nos dejó la revolución) CD (Elefant, 2009)
- La Polinesia Meridional CD (Elefant, 2011)
- La Gran Esfera LP 12"/CD (Elefant, 2019)

=== Music videos ===
- "Superguay" (Domingo González, 2004)
- "Como un fan" (Domingo González, 2005)
- "El sol no brilará nunca más" (Domingo González, 2006)
- "La revolución sexual" (Domingo González, 2007)
- "Esta noche solo cantan para mí" (Domingo González, 2008)
- "La nueva Yma Sumac" (Duprez, 2009)
- "Todas tus amigas" (Nadia Mata Portillo, 2010)
- "La Polinesia Meridional" (Jean-Marie Marbach, 2012)
- "La Fiesta Universal" (Jean-Marie Marbach, 2012)
- "A T A R A X I A" (2018)
- "Nunca Nadie Pudo Volar" (2018)
- "El Final del Amor Eterno" (2019)
- "El Momento" (2019)
- "Ivy Mike" (2019)

== Awards ==
- Goya Award for Best Original Song, 2010, "Yo también" from Yo, también
