= Platino Award for Best Sound =

- Awarded for: Best Sound
- Country: Ibero-America
- Presented by: Entidad de Gestión de Derechos de los Productores Audiovisuales (EGEDA), Federación Iberoamericana de Productores Cinematográficos y Audiovisuales (FIPCA)
- Currently held by: Amanda Villavieja, Laia Casanovas, Yasmina Praderas for Sirāt (2026)
- Website: premiosplatino.com

The Platino Award for Best Sound (Spanish: Premio Platino al mejor sonido) is one of the Platino Awards, Ibero-America's film awards, presented by the Entidad de Gestión de Derechos de los Productores Audiovisuales (EGEDA) and the Federación Iberoamericana de Productores Cinematográficos y Audiovisuales (FIPCA).

== History ==
The category was first awarded at the second edition of the awards in 2015 with José Luis Díaz being the first recipient of the award for his work in the Argentine film Wild Tales.

In the list below. the winner of the award for each year is shown first, followed by the other nominees.

== Awards and nominations ==
=== 2010s ===
Year	English title	Original title	Recipient
2015 (2nd)	(Argentina) Wild Tales	Relatos salvajes	José Luis Díaz
2015 (2nd)	(Spain) Marshland	La isla mínima	Daniel de Zayas, Pelayo Gutiérrez, Nacho Royo-Villanova
2015 (2nd)	(Cuba) Behavior	Conducta	Juan Carlos Herrera, Osmany Olivare
2015 (2nd)	(Uruguay) Mr. Kaplan		Fabián Oliver, Nacho Royo-Villanova
2015 (2nd)	(Venezuela) Bad Hair	Pelo malo	Lena Esquenazi, John Figueroa
2016 (3rd)	(Colombia) Embrace of the Serpent	El abrazo de la serpiente	Carlos García, Marco Salavería
2016 (3rd)	(Guatemala) Ixcanul		Eduardo Cáceres, Julien Cloquet
2016 (3rd)	(Argentina) The Clan	El Clan	Vicente D'Elía, Leandro de Loredo
2016 (3rd)	(Spain) Retribution	El desconocido	David Machado, Jaime Fernández, Nacho Arenas
2016 (3rd)	(Argentina) Paulina	La patota	Federico Equerro, Santiago Fumagalli, Edson Secco
2017 (4th)	(Spain) A Monster Calls	Un monstruo viene a verme	Peter Glossop, Marc Orts, Oriol Tarragó
2017 (4th)	(Venezuela) From Afar	Desde allá	Waldir Xavier
2017 (4th)	(Portugal) Letters from War	Cartas da Guerra	Ricardo Leal, Tiago Matos
2017 (4th)	(Spain) Smoke & Mirrors	El hombre de las mil caras	Daniel de Zayas, César Molina, José Antonio Manovel
2017 (4th)	(Mexico) Desierto		Sergio Díaz
2018 (5th)	(Argentina) Zama		Guido Berenblum
2018 (5th)	(Chile) A Fantastic Woman	Una mujer fantástica	Tina Laschke
2018 (5th)	(Cuba) Last Days in Havana	Últimos días en La Habana	Sheyla Pool
2018 (5th)	(Spain) Veronica	Verónica	Aitor Berenguer, Gabriel Gutiérrez, Nicolás de Poulpiquet
2018 (5th)	(Spain) The Bar	El bar	Sergio Bürmann, David Rodríguez, Nicolás de Poulpiquet
2019 (6th)	(Mexico) Roma		Sergio Díaz, José Antonio Garcia, Craig Henighan, Skip Lievsay
2019 (6th)	(Argentina) El Angel	El Ángel	José Luis Díaz
2019 (6th)	(Colombia) Birds of Passage	Pájaros de Verano	Carlos E. García
2019 (6th)	(Spain) The Realm	El reino	Roberto Fernández, Alfonso Raposo

=== 2020s ===
Year	English title	Original title	Recipient
2020 (7th)	(Colombia) Monos		Lena Esquenazi
2020 (7th)	(Argentina) The Weasel's Tale	El cuento de las comadrejas	José Luis Díaz
2020 (7th)	(Spain) While at War	Mientras dure la guerra	Aitor Berenguer, Gabriel Gutiérrez
2020 (7th)	(Spain) Pain and Glory	Dolor y gloria	Sergio Bürmann, Pelayo Gutiérrez, Marc Orts
2021 (8th)	(Guatemala) La Llorona		Eduardo Cáceres
2021 (8th)	(Colombia) Forgotten We'll Be	El olvido que seremos	Eduardo Castro, Octavio Rojas
2021 (8th)	(Mexico) I'm No Longer Here	Yo no estoy aquí	Javier Umpierrez, Yuri Laguna, Olaitan Agueh, Michelle Couttolenc, Jaime Baksht
2021 (8th)	(Spain) Coven	Akelarre	Urko Garai, Josefina Rodríguez, Frédéric Hamelin, Leandro de Loredo
2022 (9th)	(Colombia) Memoria		Akritchalerm Kalayanamitr
2022 (9th)	(Panama) Plaza Catedral		Carlos García
2022 (9th)	(Spain) The Good Boss	El buen patrón	Iván Marín, Pelayo Gutiérrez, Valeria Acieri
2022 (9th)	(Brazil) 7 Prisoners	7 Prisioneiros	Lia Camargo
2023 (10th)	(Spain) The Beasts	As bestas	Aitor Berenguer, Fabiola Ordoyo, Yasmina Praderas
2023 (10th)	(Colombia) The Kings of the World	Los reyes del mundo	Carlos García
2023 (10th)	(Bolivia) Utama		Federico Moreira
2023 (10th)	Argentina, 1985		Santiago Fumagalli
2024 (11th)	(Spain) Society of the Snow	La sociedad de la nieve	Jorge Adrados, Oriol Tarragó, Marc Orts
2024 (11th)	(Mexico) Huesera: The Bone Woman	Huesera	Christian Giraudy, Omar Pareja
2024 (11th)	(Chile) El conde		Miguel Hormazábal
2024 (11th)	(Argentina) When Evil Lurks	Cuando achecha la maldad	Pablo Isola
2025 (12th)	(Spain) Saturn Return	Segundo premio	Diana Sagrista, Alejandro Castillo, Eva Valiño, Antonin Dalmasso
2025 (12th)	(Cuba) Una Noche con los Rolling Stones		Angie Hernández
2025 (12th)	(Argentina) Kill the Jockey	El jockey	Guido Berenblum
2025 (12th)	(Spain) Undercover	La infiltrada	Jorge Castillo, Fabio Huete, Mayte Cabrera, Miriam Lisón
2026 (13th)	(Spain) Sirāt		Amanda Villavieja, Laia Casanovas, Yasmina Praderas
2026 (13th)	(Guatemala) Cordillera de fuego		Eduardo Cáceres
2026 (13th)	(Argentina) Belén		Leandro de Loredo
2026 (13th)	(Spain) Deaf	Sorda	Urko Garai, Enrique G. Bermejo, Alejandro Castillo

== See also ==
- Goya Award for Best Sound
