= Sirāt (soundtrack) =

2025 film score by Kangding Ray

Sirāt (Original Motion Picture Soundtrack)

Film score by Kangding Ray
- Released: 17 September 2025
- Recorded: 2023–2025
- Genre: Film score
- Length: 52:18
- Label: Invada
- Producer: Kangding Ray

Sirāt (Original Motion Picture Soundtrack) is the film score to the 2025 film Sirāt directed by Óliver Laxe starring Sergi López, Bruno Núñez Arjona, Richard Bellamy, Stefania Gadda, Joshua Liam Henderson, Tonin Janvier and Jade Oukid. The film score is composed by electronic musician David Letellier under his project name Kangding Ray, for which he won the Cannes Soundtrack Award and is also nominated for Golden Globe Award for Best Original Score. The album was released in digital and physical formats through Invada Records on 17 September 2025.

== Production ==
=== Background and development ===
The original score for Sirāt is composed by Kangding Ray, who was known for his breakthrough album Solens Arc (2014) and it is his sophomore film scoring assignment since Wann kommst du meine Wunden küssen (2022). In search of a right composer understanding the textural and atmospheric approach, Laxe had listened to some of Kangding Ray's albums including Solens Arc and felt that he would be the right fit for the film's soundscape, which led him to assemble some of his tracks into his playlist. Laxe approached Kangding Ray through email, insisting his involvement and the composer agreed to be involved in the film as he would compose more cinematic, ambient and spiritual sounds more than techno.

Kangding Ray and Laxe worked for over one-and-a-half years on scoring the film, finding the right way to dissolve the techno music into ethereal and spiritual, which Laxe called a process of "dematerialization" where the decay of the music mirrored the disintegration of the plot. He found the music being highly ambitious and felt it to be pretty fine. Laxe went to Berlin to discuss regarding the score, where he explained all the images he had in his mind. The first goal was to find the right atmosphere that corresponds with Laxe's thought. Kangding Ray worked on the score way before the production began, and when the film began shooting almost 80 percent of the score had been completed. Kangding Ray admitted that cinematographer Mauro Herce shooting it on 16mm film allowed for a grainy, rough analog feel, and wanted to work in this format.

=== Composition ===
The score of Sirāt was quite paradoxical, blending between the use of extremely physical and analog sounds, while also having a futuristic club feel to it. The soundscape was derived from his work in Solens Arc, where he used to channel loads of analog machines through tube compressors to give a rough and raw sound, similar to a way in Sirāt using old and proven gear bringing much texture. Through this, he tried to combine those materials with a more refined style of arranging and utilizing his production and composition skills, which found productive and reconnected with the "raw, rough and free-spirited type of party techno" which captured the rave scene. Kangding Ray noted that the particular scene had a documentary realism to it, while the sounds were much cinematic and helped it appeal to a wider audience.

For the sequence in the minefield which had a tense setting, Kangding Ray used instant synth arpeggios for the soundscape, which was contrasting as the sound was naturally not the type of music supposed to play during a tense scene like this. Despite that, he used psychedelic arpeggios over the conventional droning synths which he wanted to try. He had the track which collected the sound of dust in his archive and used in that particular scene which found scary and moving at the same period. The sound further filled the space of silence, narrating the audience that the universe tells them something, in which Kangding Ray found it to be calming.

=== Design ===
The sound design was handled and overseen by Laia Casanovas, who mixed the film in Dolby Atmos. She noted that it was difficult to "find the balance between the realism and the energy of the music" and wanted the music to feel like another character. The film had a "documentary and realistic" kind of soundscape which also felt expressive without losing the reality. She collaborated with production sound mixer Amanda Villavieja to record ambisonics stereo sounds of the desert capturing it through full-sphere 360-degree audio.

This emotionally driven approach allowed for subtle changes in sound design, especially for the later scenes in desert. Casanovas added the wind sounds in the first half are recorded from Morocco and Sahara Desert, and the sounds in the final scenes were recorded from Iceland, where the wind was silent with low frequencies, cutting the high end and pitched it down, to make it weirder and stranger. The film score also played a role in emphasizing the spirit of a road film, but Casanovas mixed the climatic accident scene with little importance for music in order to make it realistic and impactful.

== Release ==
Invada Records released the album in both digital and physical (CD and LP) formats on 17 September 2025.

== Reception ==
Justin Chang of The New Yorker wrote "The music that pours forth, composed by the electronic artist Kangding Ray, is magnificently transporting, and the ravers surrender to the beat with glorious delirium." David Fear of Rolling Stone wrote "[the] use of electronic-music composer Kangding Ray's pulsing, mesmerizing score ensures you experience a second-hand version of the dancers' collective ecstasy". Jessica Kiang of Variety called the score "astonishing" and that it matched with the film's grandeur. Natalia Keogan of The A.V. Club wrote "Elevating the emotional tenor of the film is Kangding Ray's high-intensity score, which raises the heart rate in sync with the sucker-punches that Laxe and recurrent co-writer Santiago Fillol relentlessly throw."

Ayaan Paul Chowdhury of The Hindu wrote "Kangding Ray's tectonic score repeatedly rearranges your spinal alignment. It's one of the year's most meticulously sculpted soundscapes, with a charged, nerve-deep architecture that is the film's actual bloodstream. In the rave sequences, his bass colonises the air until the bodies on screen feel like tuning forks. In quieter stretches, he pulls everything back to a bare electrical hum that feels like the desert breathing. The mutating techno-ambience is ecstatic, disorienting and brutally honest about the scale of the journey; and the multitudes to these textured vibrations are seamlessly threaded through by Laia Cassanova's incredible sound design." John Bleasdale of Time Out called it an "all-enveloping soundtrack." Lovia Gyarkye of The Hollywood Reporter called Kangding Ray's score "hypnotic" and "rhythmic" which is further complimented by "Laia Casanova's stellar sound design, which turns the ambient noises of the desert into their own soundtrack."

== Track listing ==
No.	Title	Length
1.	"Sirāt"	4:18
2.	"Horizon"	3:04
3.	"En La Noche"	4:46
4.	"Katharsis"	6:08
5.	"Desierto"	4:08
6.	"La Route"	3:21
7.	"The Fall"	3:39
8.	"Ritual"	3:13
9.	"Les Marches"	9:25
10.	"Surah Maryam" (Excerpt) (feat. Ali Keeler)	1:51
11.	"Blank Empire" (Sirāt Hu Remix)	4:02
12.	"Amber Decay" (Sirāt Remix)	4:23
Total length:		52:18

== Charts ==
Chart (2026)	Peak position
French Physical Albums (SNEP)	118

== Accolades ==
Award	Date of ceremony	Category	Recipient(s)	Result	Ref.
Cannes Film Festival	24 May 2025	Cannes Soundtrack Award	Kangding Ray	Won	
Los Angeles Film Critics Association Awards	7 December 2025	Best Music Score	Kangding Ray	Won	
Critics' Choice Awards	4 January 2026	Best Sound	Laia Casanovas	Lost	
Golden Globe Awards	11 January 2026	Best Original Score	Kangding Ray	Lost	
European Film Awards	17 January 2026	Best Sound Design	Yasmina Praderas, Amanda Villavieja, Laia Casanovas	Won	
Feroz Awards	24 January 2026	Best Original Soundtrack	Kangding Ray	Won	
