= Goya Award for Best Sound =

Annual award by the Spanish Film Academy

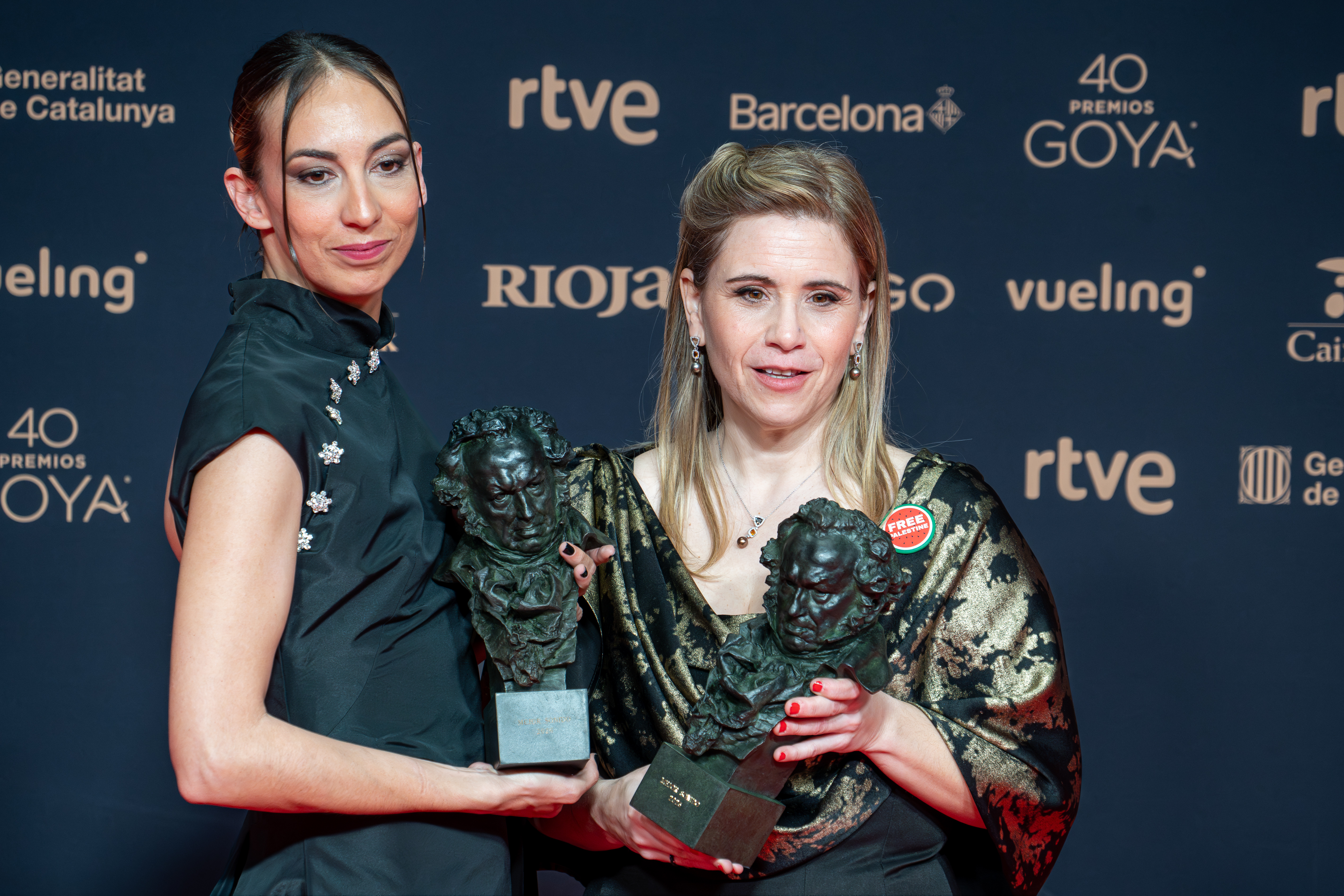
- Laia Casanovas and Yasmina Praderas
- Native name: Premio Goya al mejor sonido
- Awarded for: Best sound in a Spanish film of the year
- Country: Spain
- Presented by: Academy of Cinematographic Arts and Sciences of Spain (AACCE)
- First award: 1st Goya Awards (1986)
- Most recent winner: Amanda Villavieja, Laia Casanovas, Yasmina Praderas; Sirāt (2025)
- Website: Official website

The Goya Award for Best Sound (Spanish: Premio Goya al mejor sonido) is one of the Goya Awards presented annually by the Academy of Cinematographic Arts and Sciences of Spain (AACCE) since the awards debuted in 1986. Bernardo Menz and Enrique Molinero were the first winners of the category for their work in Werther (1986). Gilles Ortion holds the record of most wins in this category winning eight times, followed by Alfonso Pino with seven wins.

At the European Film Awards, Oriol Tarragó won Best Sound Designer for A Monster Calls.

== Winners and nominees ==
=== 1980s ===
Year	English title	Original title	Recipient(s)
1986 (1st)	Werther		Bernardo Menz and Enrique Molinero
1986 (1st)	The Bastard Brother of God	El hermano bastardo de Dios	Carlos Faruolo and Alfonso Pino
1986 (1st)	Luna de agosto		José María Bloch and Alfonso Pino
1987 (2nd)	Divinas palabras		Miguel Ángel Polo and Enrique Molinero
1987 (2nd)	El bosque animado		Bernardo Menz and Enrique Molinero
1987 (2nd)	El pecador impecable		Carlos Faruolo and Enrique Molinero
1988 (3rd)	Berlín Blues		Carlos Faruolo and Enrique Molinero
1988 (3rd)	El Dorado		Gilles Ortion
1988 (3rd)	Women on the Verge of a Nervous Breakdown	Mujeres al borde de un ataque de nervios	Gilles Ortion
1988 (3rd)	Pasodoble		Daniel Goldstein and Ricardo Steinberg
1988 (3rd)	Rowing with the Wind	Remando al viento	Daniel Goldstein and Ricardo Steinberg
1989 (4th)	Love, Hate and Death	Montoyas y Tarantos	Antonio Bloch, Francisco Peramos and Manuel Cora
1989 (4th)	Amanece, que no es poco		Carlos Faruolo and Enrique Molinero
1989 (4th)	Bajarse al moro		Miguel Ángel Polo and Enrique Molinero
1989 (4th)	The Sea and the Weather	El mar y el tiempo	Gilles Ortion and Eduardo Fernández
1989 (4th)	Twisted Obsession	El sueño del mono loco	Georges Prat, Pablo Blanco and Eduardo Fernández
1989 (4th)	The Dark Nigh	La noche oscura	Gilles Ortion and Carlos Faruolo

=== 1990s ===
Year	English title	Original title	Recipient(s)
1990 (5th)	¡Ay Carmela!		Gilles Ortion and Alfonso Pino
1990 (5th)	Tie Me Up! Tie Me Down!	¡Átame!	Daniel Goldstein and Ricardo Steinberg
1990 (5th)	Letters from Alou	Las cartas de Alou	Eduardo Fernández and Pierre Lorrain
1991 (6th)	The Dumbfounded King	El rey pasmado	Ricard Casals and Gilles Ortion
1991 (6th)	Prince of Shadows	Beltenebros	Carlos Faruolo, Manuel Cora and Alberto Herena
1991 (6th)	High Heels	Tacones lejanos	Jean-Paul Mugel
1992 (7th)	Club Virginia Orchestra	Orquesta Club Virginia	Julio Recuero, Gilles Ortion, Enrique Molinero and José Antonio Bermúdez
1992 (7th)	Belle Époque		Georges Prat and Alfonso Pino
1992 (7th)	Jamón Jamón		Miguel Rejas and Ricard Casals
1993 (8th)	Everyone Off to Jail	Todos a la cárcel	Gilles Ortion, Daniel Goldstein, Manuel Cora, Alberto Herena and Enrique Quintana
1993 (8th)	Kika		Jean-Paul Mugel and Graham V. Hartstone
1993 (8th)	The Bird of Happiness	El pájaro de la felicidad	Carlos Faruolo
1994 (9th)	The Worst Years of Our Lives	Los peores años de nuestra vida	Polo Aledo, José Antonio Bermúdez, Carlos Garrido and Gilles Ortion
1994 (9th)	Running Out of Time	Días contados	Gilles Ortion and John Hayward
1994 (9th)	The Turkish Passion	La pasión turca	Gilles Ortion and Ricard Casals
1995 (10th)	The Day of the Beast	El día de la bestia	Miguel Rejas, Gilles Ortion, José Antonio Bermúdez, Carlos Garrido and Ray Gillon
1995 (10th)	Mouth to Mouth	Boca a boca	Carlos Faruolo, James Muñoz and Brian Sounders
1995 (10th)	The Flower of My Secret	La flor de mi secreto	Bernardo Menz and Graham V. Hartstone
1996 (11th)	Thesis	Tesis	Daniel Goldstein, Ricardo Steinberg and Alfonso Pino
1996 (11th)	The Dog in the Manger	El perro del hortelano	Antonio Bloch, Carlos Faruolo and Ray Gillon
1996 (11th)	Libertarias		Carlos Faruolo, Ray Gillón and Ricard Casals
1997 (12th)	Secrets of the Heart	Secretos del corazón	Gilles Ortion, Alfonso Pino and Bella María Da Costa
1997 (12th)	Time of Happiness	El tiempo de la felicidad	Daniel Goldstein, Ricardo Steinberg and Eduardo Fernández
1997 (12th)	Martín (hache)		Daniel Goldstein, Ricardo Steinberg, Carlos Garrido and Ángel Gallardo
1998 (13th)	Tango	Tango, no me dejes nunca	Jorge Stavropulos, Carlos Faruolo and Alfonso Pino
1998 (13th)	Open Your Eyes	Abre los ojos	Daniel Goldstein, Ricardo Steinberg and Patrick Ghislain
1998 (13th)	The Grandfather	El abuelo	José Antonio Bermúdez, Diego Garrido and Antonio García
1998 (13th)	The Girl of Your Dreams	La niña de tus ojos	Pierre Gamet, Dominique Hennequin and Santiago Thévenet
1999 (14th)	All About My Mother	Todo sobre mi madre	Miguel Rejas, José Antonio Bermúdez and Diego Garrido
1999 (14th)	Goya in Bordeaux	Goya en Burdeos	Carlos Faurolo, Alfonso Pino, Alfonso Raposo and Jaime Fernández
1999 (14th)	Butterfly's Tongue	La lengua de las mariposas	Daniel Goldstein, Ricardo Steinberg and Patrick Ghislain
1999 (14th)	Solas		Jorge Marín, Patrick Ghislain and Carlos Faruolo

=== 2000s ===
Year	English title	Original title	Recipient(s)
2000 (15th)	Calle 54		Thom Cadley, Mark Wilder, Pierre Gamet, Martín Gamet, Dominique Henequin and Marisa Hernández
2000 (15th)	Pellet	El Bola	Sergio Burman, Daniel Goldstein, Ricardo Steinberg and Jaime Fernández
2000 (15th)	Plenilune	Plenilunio	Gilles Ortion, Ray Gillón and James Muñoz
2000 (15th)	Common Wealth	La comunidad	Antonio Rodríguez "Mármol", Jaime Fernández, James Muñoz, Enrique Domínguez and José Vinade
2001 (16th)	The Others	Los otros	Ricardo Steinberg, Tim Cavagin, Alfonso Raposo and Daniel Goldstein
2001 (16th)	Mad Love	Juana la Loca	Daniel Fontrodona, David Calleja and James Muñoz
2001 (16th)	Sex and Lucia	Lucía y el sexo	Agustín Peinado, Alfonso Pino, Santiago Thevenet and Polo González Aledo
2001 (16th)	Don't Tempt Me	Sin noticias de Dios	Antonio Rodríguez "Mármol", José Antonio Bermúdez, Diego Garrido, Pelayo Gutiérrez and Nacho Royo
2002 (17th)	The Other Side of the Bed	El otro lado de la cama	Gilles Ortion, Alfonso Pino, Pelayo Gutiérrez and José Vinader
2002 (17th)	Darkness		Salva Máyolas, Dani Fontrodona and Marc Orts
2002 (17th)	Talk to Her	Talk to Her	Miguel Rejas, José Antonio Bermúdez, Manuel Laguna, Rosa Ortiz and Diego Garrido
2002 (17th)	Box 507	La caja 507	Licio Marcos de Oliveira, Luis de Veciana and Alfonso Pino
2003 (18th)	Take My Eyes	Te doy mis ojos	Eva Valiño, Alfonso Pino, Pelayo Gutiérrez and José L. Crespo
2003 (18th)	The Forest	La selva	Silvio Darrin, Carlos Garrido and Alicia Saavedra
2003 (18th)	La vida mancha		Licio Marcos de Oliveira, Alfonso Pino, Nacho Royo, Alberto Pinto and José Manuel Morell
2003 (18th)	Más de mil cámaras velan por tu seguridad		Agustín Peinado, Carlos Garrido, Iván Mayoral and Rakel Fernández
2004 (19th)	The Sea Inside	Mar adentro	Ricardo Steinberg, Alfonso Raposo, Juan Ferro and María Steinberg
2004 (19th)	Isi-Disi, Rough Love	Isi/Disi. Amor a lo bestia	Antonio Mármol, Patrick Ghislain and Nacho Royo
2004 (19th)	Swindled	Incautos	Pierre Lorrain, Jaime Fernández and Polo Aledo
2004 (19th)	Crimen Ferpecto		Sergio Burmann, Jaime Fernández and Charly Schmukler
2005 (20th)	Obaba		Carlos Bonmati, Alfonso Pino and Pelayo Gutiérrez
2005 (20th)	Los nombres de Alicia		Eladio Reguero and David Calleja
2005 (20th)	Princesas		Miguel Rejas, Alfonso Raposo and Polo Aledo
2005 (20th)	Ninette		Miguel Rejas and José Antonio Bermúdez
2006 (21st)	Pan's Labyrinth	El laberinto del fauno	Miguel Polo and Martín Hernández
2006 (21st)	Alatriste		Pierre Gamet, Dominique Hennequin and Patrice Grisolet
2006 (21st)	Salvador (Puig Antich)		Alastair Widgery, David Calleja and James Muñoz
2006 (21st)	Volver		Miguel Rejas, José Antonio Bermúdez, Manuel Laguna and Diego Garrido
2007 (22nd)	The Orphanage	El orfanato	Xavi Mas, Marc Orts and Oriol Tarragó
2007 (22nd)	13 Roses	Las 13 Rosas	Carlos Bonmati, Alfonso Pino and Carlos Faruolo
2007 (22nd)	Always Yours	Tuya siempre	Licio Marcos de Oliveira, Carlos Fesser and David Calleja
2007 (22nd)	Seven Billiard Tables	Siete mesas dee billar francés	Iván Marín, José Antonio Bermúdez and Leopoldo Aledo
2008 (23rd)	Before the Fall	Tres días	Daniel de Zayas, Jorge Marín and Maite Rivera
2008 (23rd)	The Blind Sunflowers	Los girasoles ciegos	Ricardo Steinberg, María Steinberg and Alfonso Raposo
2008 (23rd)	Blood in May	Sangre de mayo	Miguel Rejas and José Antonio Bermúdez
2008 (23rd)	Just Walking	Sólo quiero caminar	Pierre Gamet, Christophe Vingtrinier and Patrice Grisolet
2009 (24th)	Cell 211	Celda 211	Sergio Burmann, Jaime Fernández and Carlos Faruolo
2009 (24th)	Agora	Ágora	Peter Glossop and Glenn Freemantle
2009 (24th)	The Dancer and the Thief	El baile de la Victoria	Pierre Gamet, Nacho Royo-Villanova and Pelayo Gutiérrez
2009 (24th)	Map of the Sounds of Tokyo	Mapa de los sonidos de Tokio	Aitor Berenguer, Marc Orts and Fabiola Ordoyo

=== 2010s ===
Year	English title	Original title	Recipient(s)
2010 (25th)	Buried	Buried (Enterrado)	Urko Garai, Marc Orts and James Muñoz
2010 (25th)	The Last Circus	Balada triste de trompeta	Charly Schmukler and Diego Garrido
2010 (25th)	Black Bread	Pa negre (Pan negro)	Dani Fontrodona, Fernando Novillo and Ricard Casals
2010 (25th)	Even the Rain	También la lluvia	Emilio Cortés, Nacho Royo-Villanova and Pelayo Gutiérrez
2011 (26th)	No Rest for the Wicked	No habrá paz para los malvados	Licio Marcos de Oliveira and Ignacio Royo-Villanova
2011 (26th)	Blackthorn		Daniel Fontrodona, Marc Orts and Fabiola Ordoyo
2011 (26th)	EVA		Jordi Rossinyol, Oriol Tarragó and Marc Orts
2011 (26th)	The Skin I Live In	La piel que habito	Iván Marín, Marc Orts and Pelayo Gutiérrez
2012 (27th)	The Impossible	Lo imposible	Peter Glossop, Marc Orts and Oriol Tarragó
2012 (27th)	The Artist and the Model	El artista y la modelo	Pierre Gamet, Nacho Royo-Villanova and Eduardo García Castro
2012 (27th)	Unit 7	Grupo 7	Daniel de Zayas Ramírez, Nacho Royo-Villanova and Pelayo Gutiérrez
2012 (27th)	Invader	Invasor	Sergio Burmann, Nicolás de Poulpiquet and James Muñoz
2013 (28th)	Witching & Bitching	Las brujas de Zugarramurdi	Charly Schmukler and Nicolás de Poulpiquet
2013 (28th)	Family United	La gran familia española	Carlos Faruolo and Jaime Fernández
2013 (28th)	Cannibal	Caníbal	Eva Valiño, Nacho Royo-Villanova and Pelayo Gutiérrez
2013 (28th)	Wounded	La herida	Aitor Berenguer Abasolo, Jaime Fernández and Nacho Arenas
2014 (29th)	El Niño		Sergio Bürmann, Marc Orts and Oriol Tarragó
2014 (29th)	Autómata		Nicolás de Poulpiquet and Gabriel Gutiérrez
2014 (29th)	Marshland	La isla mínima	Daniel de Zayas, Nacho Royo-Villanova and Pelayo Gutiérrez
2014 (29th)	Mortadelo and Filemon: Mission Implausible	Mortadelo y Filemón contra Jimmy el Cachondo	Nicolás de Poulpiquet and James Muñoz
2015 (30th)	Retribution	El desconocido	David Machado, Jaime Fernández and Nacho Arenas
2015 (30th)	Spy Time	Anacleto: agente secreto	Sergio Bürmann, Marc Orts and Oriol Tarragó
2015 (30th)	The Bride	La novia	Nacho Arenas, Clemens Grulich and César Molina
2015 (30th)	My Big Night	Mi gran noche	Sergio Bürmann, Nicolás de Poulpiquet and David Rodríguez
2016 (31st)	A Monster Calls	Un monstruo viene a verme	Peter Glossop, Marc Orts and Oriol Tarragó
2016 (31st)	1898, Our Last Men in the Philippines	1898, Los últimos de Filipinas	Eduardo Esquide, Juan Ferro and Nicolás de Poulpiquet
2016 (31st)	Smoke & Mirrors	El hombre de las mil caras	Daniel de Zayas, César Molina and José Antonio Manovel
2016 (31st)	Ozzy		Nacho Royo-Villanova and Sergio Testón
2017 (32nd)	Verónica		Aitor Berenguer, Nicolás de Poulpiquet, Gabriel Gutiérrez
2017 (32nd)	The Motive	El autor	Daniel de Zayas, Pelayo Gutiérrez and Alberto Ovejero
2017 (32nd)	The Bar	El bar	Sergio Bürmann, David Rodríguez and Nicolas de Poulpiquet
2017 (32nd)	Giant	Handia	Iñaki Díez and Xanti Salvador
2018 (33rd)	The Realm	El reino	Roberto Fernández and Alfonso Raposo
2018 (33rd)	Champions	Campeones	Arman Ciudad, Charly Schmukler and Alfonso Raposo
2018 (33rd)	Quién te cantará	Quién te cantará	Daniel de Zayas, Eduardo Castro and Mario González
2018 (33rd)	Yuli: The Carlos Acosta Story	Yuli	Eva Valiño, Pelayo Gutiérrez and Alberto Ovejero
2019 (34th)	The Endless Trench	La trinchera infinita	Iñaki Díez, Alazne Ameztoy, Xanti Salvador and Nacho Royo-Villanova
2019 (34th)	Pain and Glory	Dolor y gloria	Sergio Bürmann, Pelayo Gutiérrez and Marc Orts
2019 (34th)	While at War	Mientras dure la guerra	Aitor Berenguer and Gabriel Gutiérrez
2019 (34th)	Eye for an Eye	Quien a hierro mata	David Machado, Gabriel Gutiérrez and Yasmina Praderas

=== 2020s ===
Year	English title	Original title	Recipient(s)
2020 (35th)	Adú		Eduardo Esquide, Jamaica Ruíz García, Juan Ferro and Nicolás de Poulpiquet
2020 (35th)	Coven	Akelarre	Urko Garai, Josefina Rodríguez, Frédéric Hamelin and Leandro de Loredo
2020 (35th)	Black Beach		Coque Lahera, Nacho Royo-Villanova and Sergio Testón
2020 (35th)	The Plan	El plan	Mar González, Francesco Lucarelli and Nacho Royo-Villanova
2021 (36th)	Out of Sync	Tres	Daniel Fontrodona, Oriol Tarragó, Marc Bech and Marc Orts
2021 (36th)	The Good Boss	El buen patrón	Iván Marín, Pelayo Gutiérrez, Valeria Arcieri
2021 (36th)	Parallel Mothers	Madres paralelas	Sergio Bürmann, Laia Casanovas, Marc Orts
2021 (36th)	Maixabel		Alazne Ameztoy, Juan Ferro, Candela Palencia
2022 (37th)	The Beasts	As bestas	Aitor Berenguer, Fabiola Ordoyo, Yasmina Praderas
2022 (37th)	Alcarràs		Eva Valiño, Thomas Giorgi, Alejandro Castillo
2022 (37th)	Lullaby	Cinco lobitos	Asier González, Eva de la Fuente López, Roberto Fernández
2022 (37th)	Prison 77	Modelo 77	Daniel de Zayas, Miguel Huete, Pelayo Gutiérrez, Valeria Arcieri
2022 (37th)	One Year, One Night	Un año, una noche	Amanda Villavieja, Eva Valiño, Marc Orts, Alejandro Castillo
2023 (38th)	Society of the Snow	La sociedad de la nieve	Jorge Adrados, Oriol Tarragó, Marc Orts
2023 (38th)	20,000 Species of Bees	20.000 especies de abejas	Eva Valiño, Koldo Corella, Xanti Salvador
2023 (38th)	Close Your Eyes	Cerrar los ojos	Iván Marín, Juan Ferro, Candela Palencia
2023 (38th)	Championext	Campionext	Tamara Arévalo, Fabiola Ordoyo, Yasmina Praderas
2023 (38th)	Jokes & Cigarettes	Saben aquell	Xavi Mas, Eduardo Castro, Yasmina Praderas
2024 (39th)	Saturn Return	Segundo Premio	Diana Sagrista, Eva Valiño, Alejandro Castillo, Antonin Dalmasso
2024 (39th)	The Blue Star	La estrella azul	Amanda Villavieja, Joaquín Rajadel, Víctor R. Puertas, Mayte Cabrera, Nicolas de Poulpiquet
2024 (39th)	The Room Next Door	La habitación de al lado	Sergio Bürmann, Anna Harrington, Marc Orts
2024 (39th)	Undercover	La infiltrada	Fabio Huete, Jorge Castillo Ballesteros, Miriam Lisón, Mayte Cabrera
2024 (39th)	The Red Virgin	La virgen roja	Coque F. Lahera, Álex F Capilla, Nacho Royo-Villanova
2025 (40th)	Sirāt		Amanda Villavieja, Laia Casanovas, Yasmina Praderas
2025 (40th)	The Captive	El cautivo	Aitor Berenguer, Gabriel Gutiérrez, Candela Palencia
2025 (40th)	Sundays	Los domingos	Andrea Sáenz Pereiro, Mayte Cabrera
2025 (40th)	Los Tigres		Daniel de Zayas, Gabriel Gutiérrez, Candela Palencia
2025 (40th)	Deaf	Sorda	Urko Garai, Enrique G. Bermejo, Alejandro Castillo
