= Eva Valiño =

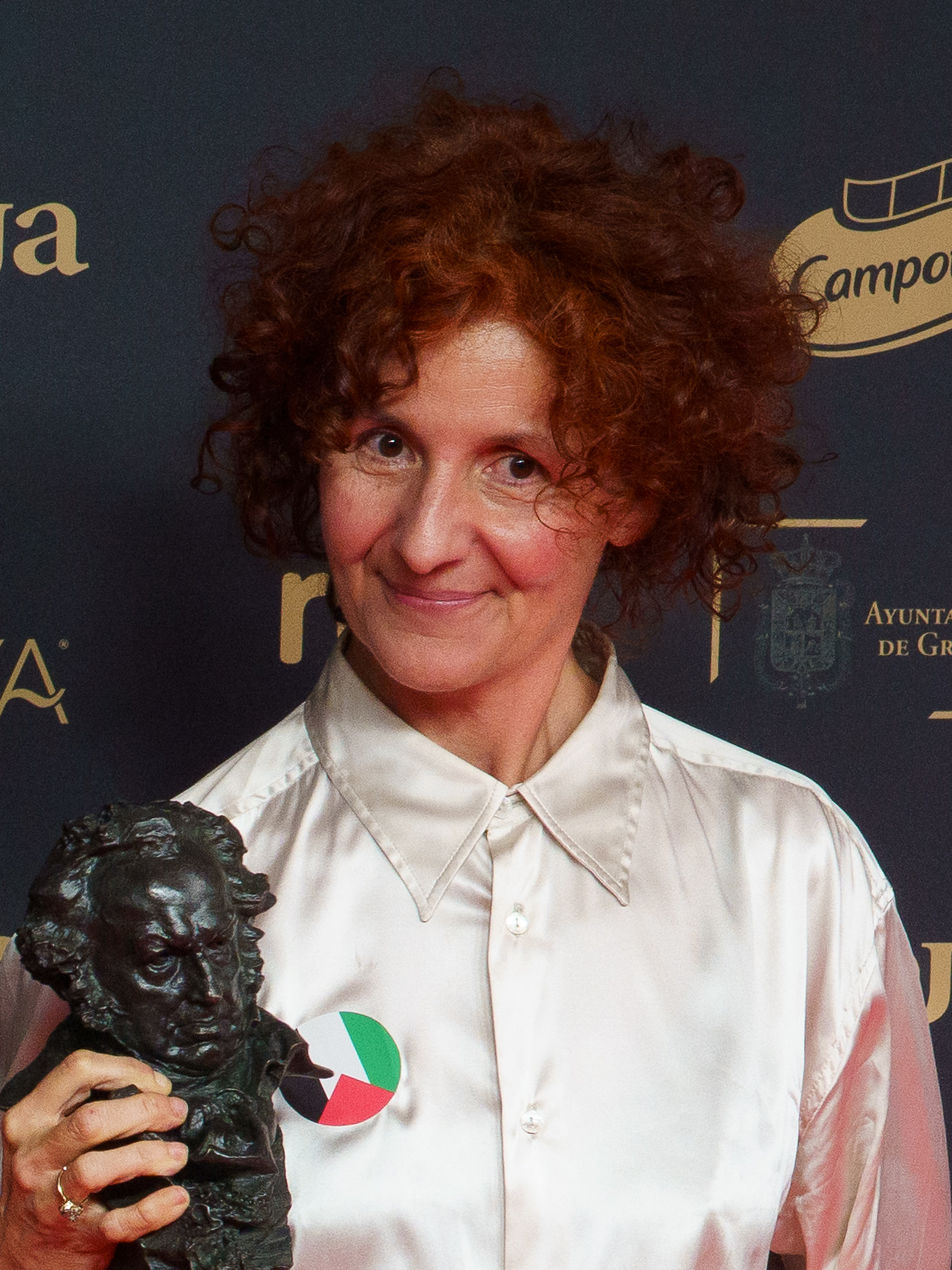
- Valiño in 2025
- Born: Eva Valiño Esparducer; 29 July 1969 (age 56); Barcelona, Spain
- Occupations: Sound designer; lecturer

Eva Valiño Esparducer (born 29 July 1969) is a Spanish sound designer and lecturer.

== Life and career ==
Eva Valiño Esparducer was born in Barcelona on 29 July 1969. Valiño graduated in information sciences and performing arts from the ISAEA. After working in advertising in Costa Rica, she moved to New Orleans (where she studied music and became involved in the analysis of film soundtracks through an acousmatic approach), and then to the EICTV in Cuba, where she specialised in sound. She went on to develop a career as chief responsible for the live sound in multiple films (both in Spain and internationally), becoming a recurring collaborator of Icíar Bollaín, Manuel Martín Cuenca, and Jaime Rosales.

She is the recipient of multiple accolades, including two Goya Awards for Best Sound for Take My Eyes and Saturn Return, having also received nominations for Cannibal, Summer 1993, and Yuli: The Carlos Acosta Story.
