= Kangding Ray =

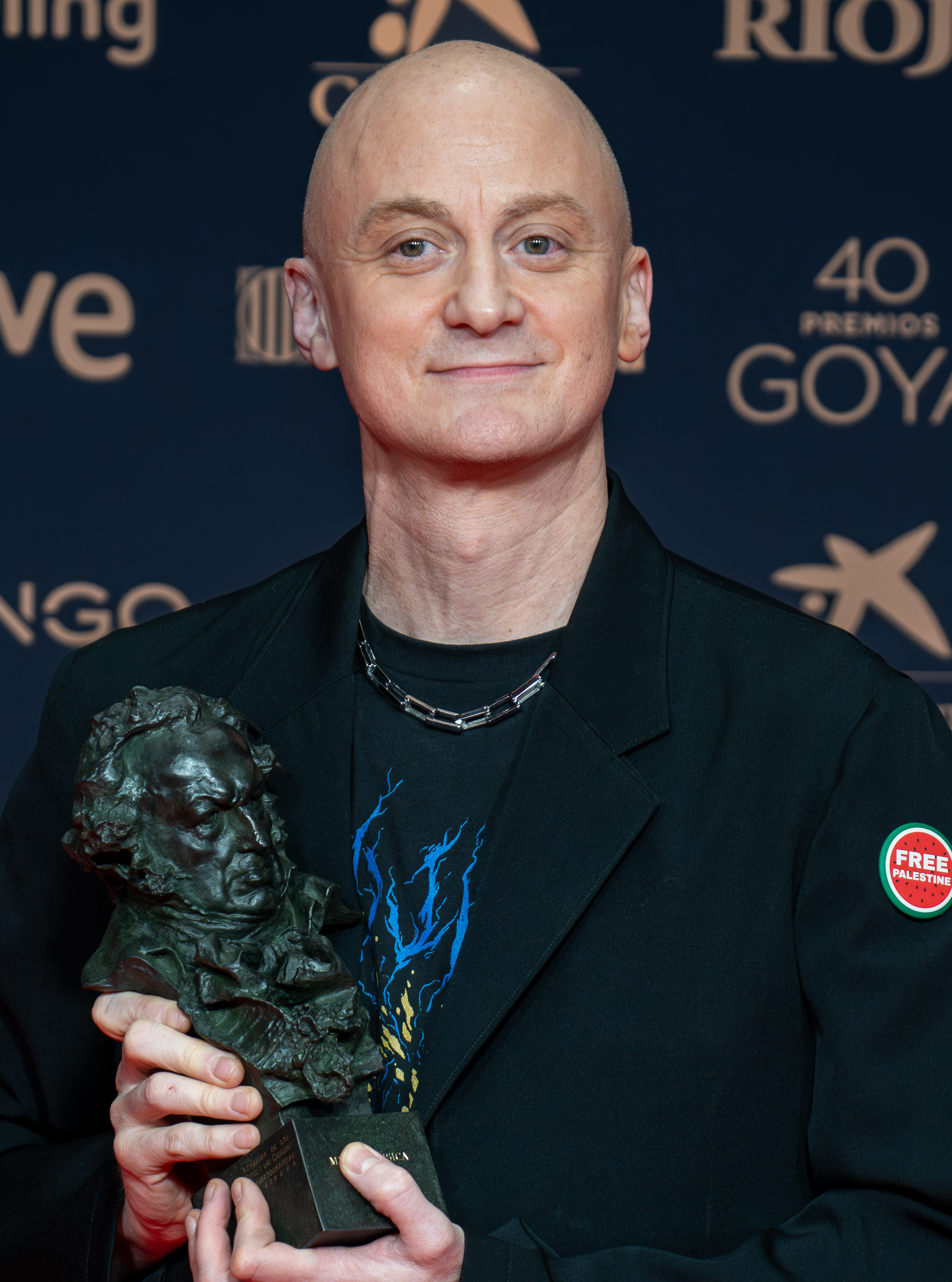
- Kangding Ray in 2026

Background information
- Born: David Letellier
- Genres: Techno, Experimental
- Labels: Raster-Noton, Stroboscopic Artefact
- Website: www.kangdingray.com

Kangding Ray (born 1978) is a French musician, DJ and producer working in Berlin. He is notable for the film score of the 2025 drama road film Sirāt directed by Óliver Laxe.

== Early life ==
Letellier was born in Normandy, France. Letellier used to play guitar in a rock band. He trained as an architect in Rennes, but moved to Berlin to complete his studies where he got involved in electronic music. He started creating his own in circa 2002.

When Letellier was vacationing in China, he got a call from his label, pressing him for an artist name. He happened to be in Kangding at the time.

== Career ==
In 2022, Kangding Ray collaborated with Tamara Gvozdenovic.

The soundtrack for Sirāt is the second movie score by Kangding Ray after Wann kommst du meine Wunden küssen (2022). He collaborated with the movie's director Laxe for 1,5 years before shooting the film. The soundtrack for Sirāt has won the following prizes: Cannes Jury Prize for Soundtrack (together with Mascha Schilinski for Sound of Falling), the Feroz and Goya Awards for Original Soundtrack, and the Gaudi Prize (2026).

He cites Eduard Artemyev as a huge influence.

== Discography ==
- Stabil (2006)
- Automne Fold (2008)
- Pruitt Igoe (2010)
- Or (2011)
- Monad XI (2012)
- The Pentaki Slopes (2012)
- Tempered Inmid (2013)
- Solens Arc (2014)
- Cory Arcane (2015)
- Hyper Opal Mantis (2017)
- Predawn Qualia (2019)
- 61 Mirrors. Music for SKALAR (2020)
- Ultrachroma (2022)
- Kiss my wounds (2023)
