= Sirāt (film) =

2025 film by Oliver Laxe

- Spanish theatrical release poster
- Directed by: Óliver Laxe
- Screenplay by: Santiago Fillol; Óliver Laxe
- Produced by: Domingo Corral; Óliver Laxe; Xavi Font; Pedro Almodóvar; Agustín Almodóvar; Esther García; Oriol Maymó; Mani Mortazavi; Andrea Queralt
- Starring: Sergi López; Bruno Núñez Arjona; Richard Bellamy; Stefania Gadda; Joshua Liam Henderson; Tonin Janvier; Jade Oukid
- Cinematography: Mauro Herce
- Edited by: Cristóbal Fernández
- Music by: Kangding Ray
- Production companies: Los Desertores Films AIE; Telefónica Audiovisual Digital; Filmes Da Ermida; El Deseo; Uri Films; 4A4 Productions
- Distributed by: BTeam Pictures (Spain); Pyramide Films (France)
- Release dates: 15 May 2025 (Cannes); 6 June 2025 (Spain); 10 September 2025 (France)
- Running time: 114 minutes
- Countries: Spain; France
- Languages: Spanish; French
- Budget: €6.5 million
- Box office: $13 million

Sirāt is a 2025 drama road film directed by Óliver Laxe and co-written by Santiago Fillol and Laxe. It follows a father (Sergi López) in search of his missing daughter along with his son and a group of ravers in the deserts of southern Morocco.

The film had its world premiere on 15 May 2025 in the main competition of the 78th Cannes Film Festival, where it won the Jury Prize. It was theatrically released in Spain on 6 June 2025 by BTeam Pictures, and in France on 10 September 2025 by Pyramide Films. It won Best Cinematography, Editing, Sound, Original Score, Production Supervision and Art Direction at the 40th Goya Awards. At the 98th Academy Awards, it was nominated for Best International Feature Film and Best Sound.

== Plot ==
Luis, along with his son Esteban, travels to a rave held in the deserts of southern Morocco in search of his missing daughter, Mar. A subgroup of ravers tells them that another rave is taking place deeper in the desert afterwards, and that Mar could be there. When a group of soldiers arrives to stop the rave and order European ravers to evacuate, the subgroup breaks away in two vans, with Luis, Esteban and their dog Pipa following suit in their compact van. Radio reports that armed conflict between two countries has commenced, which soon escalates into a World War III-like event.

The ravers, consisting of Stef, Jade, Tonin, Bigui, and Josh, attempt to dissuade Luis and Esteban to no avail. Heading south to a location "close to Mauritania", the group encounters mishaps and grow closer. They share food and fuel, cross a river together in their vehicles, nurse Pipa back to health when she falls ill after eating the ravers' LSD-contaminated feces, and Tonin does a musical number while improvising a puppetry show using his leg stump. While crossing a mountain pass, one of the vans is stuck in a rut. The group manages to free the vehicle, but amid their celebration Luis's van rolls backwards off a cliff with Esteban and Pipa inside, killing them both.

The remaining group members drive further into the desert looking for help, coming across a nomadic herder who runs off when approached. A grief-stricken Luis walks into the desert alone; he is rescued by Jade and Stef. Looking to lift the group's spirits, Jade asks them to use a psychoactive drug and improvises a rave in the desert with two loudspeakers. While in a trance, she dies in an explosion after stepping on a land mine. Trying to reach Jade, Tonin steps on another mine and is killed.

Realising that they are in the middle of a minefield, the survivors are determined to reach a presumably mine-free rocky area some 60 metres away. They send one empty van forward, trying to secure a safe path; the van explodes after hitting a mine. They repeat the operation with the second van, but the van veers off course when it activates a second mine and is destroyed after hitting a third, failing to create the path they intended. Unfazed, Luis walks straight forward and reaches the area successfully. Bigui attempts to do the same but dies after stepping on a mine. With great hesitation, Stef and Josh, carrying Jade's dog in hands, follow suit with their eyes shut and safely reach Luis. Earlier a railway was briefly seen; the movie ends with the three survivors crossing the desert on the open wagons of an ore train along with other people.

== Cast ==
- Sergi López as Luis
- Bruno Núñez Arjona as Esteban
- Richard Bellamy as Bigui
- Stefania Gadda as Stef
- Joshua Liam Henderson as Josh
- Tonin Janvier as Tonin
- Jade Oukid as Jade

== Production ==
=== Development ===
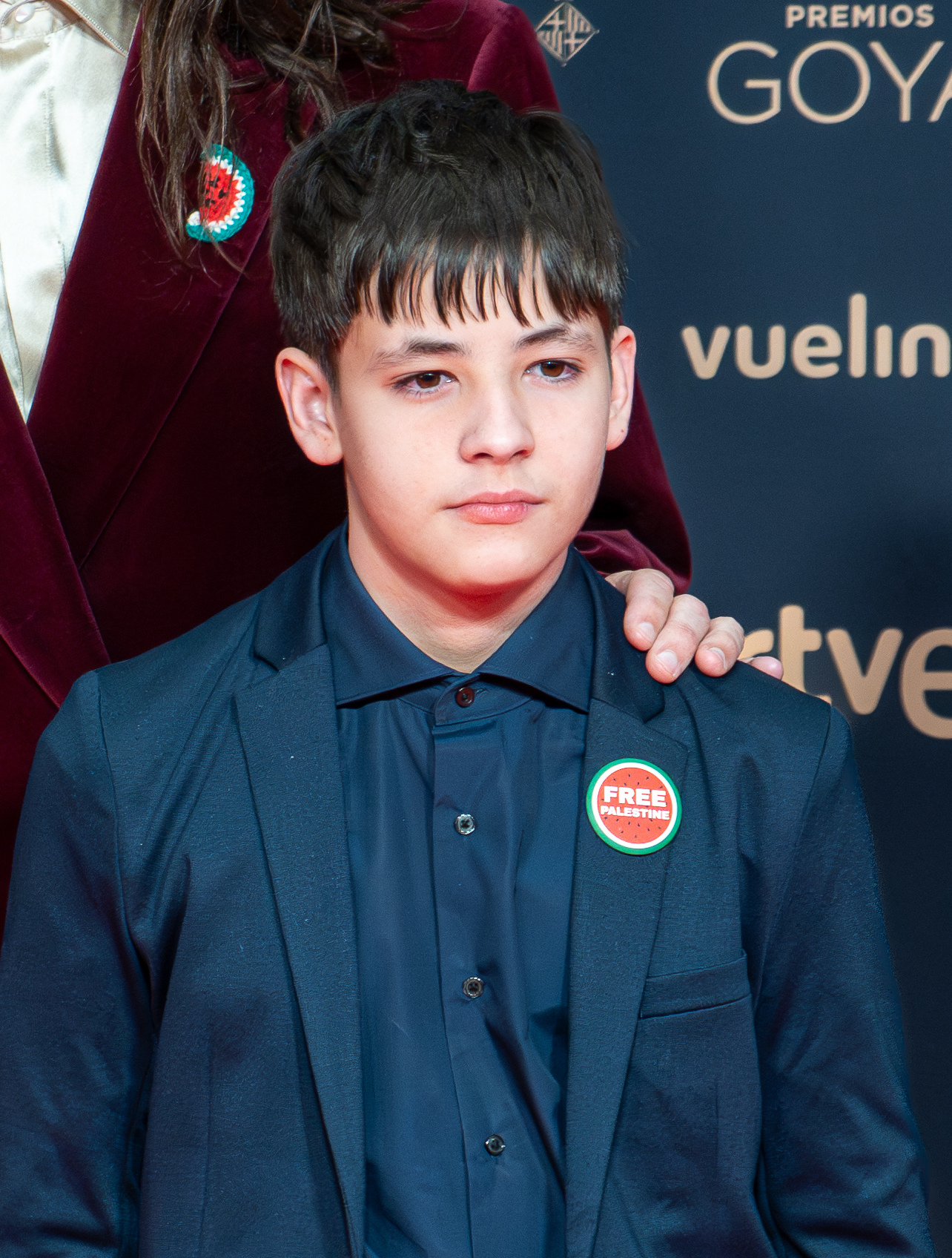
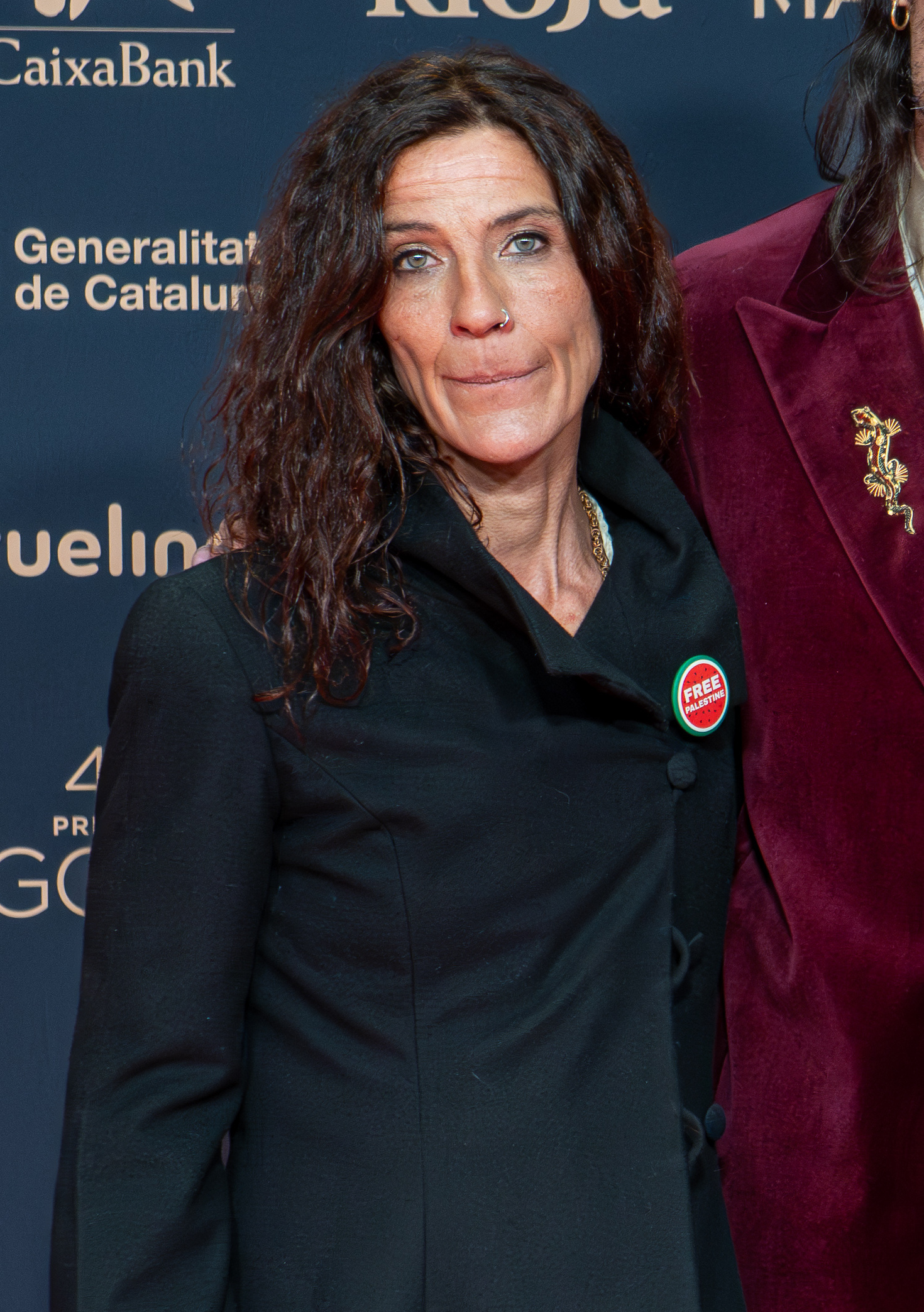
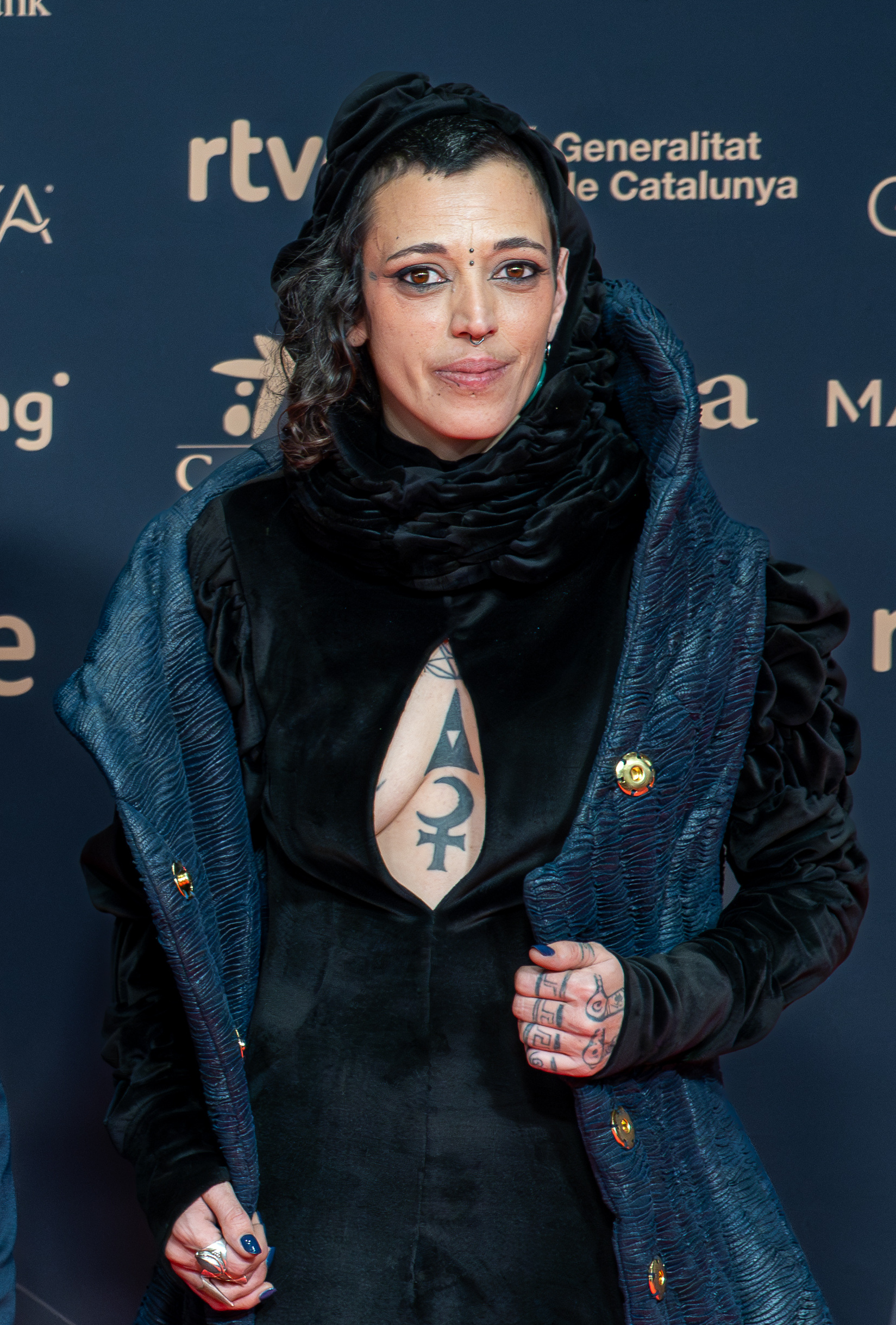
Cast members Núñez, Gadda, and Oukid attending the 2026 Goya Awards

Laxe had considered making a film based on the simple concept of "trucks crossing the desert". In 2011, he wrote a treatment about a truck race, which he likened to the TV series Wacky Races, but the project ultimately failed to materialize. While making his second feature film Mimosas, Laxe reconnected with rave culture, and decided to retool the concept for a new script about dancing.

In November 2023, the film, which was still in development, received a production grant of €1.2 million from Spain's Institute of Cinematography and Audiovisual Arts. In January 2024, Movistar Plus+ revealed the film as part of a five-project slate to be produced by the platform, with traditional theatrical windows but whose end purpose would be airing on the Spanish streamer. Laxe described his then-untitled film as a story about "some rave attendees in Morocco among whom a father and son are searching for their missing daughter and sister", imagining it to be "very hypnotic, and very sensorial". He also referred to the film as his "most political" and "most radical". The film had a reported budget of €6.5 million.

Besides Sergi López and Bruno Núñez, none of the main cast members were professional actors, and were selected instead in a street-casting process led by costume designer and casting director Nadia Acimi, Laxe's former wife and a raver herself. Jade Oukid, a French photographer, amateur filmmaker and seamstress, was found at a festival in Portugal. Tonin Janvier, a French street festival performer, spent a significant part of his life in West Africa and lost a leg in a motorcycle accident. Stefania Gadda, an Italian rancher who lives off-the-grid, was found in the Spanish town of Órgiva on the recommendation of local residents.

=== Filming ===
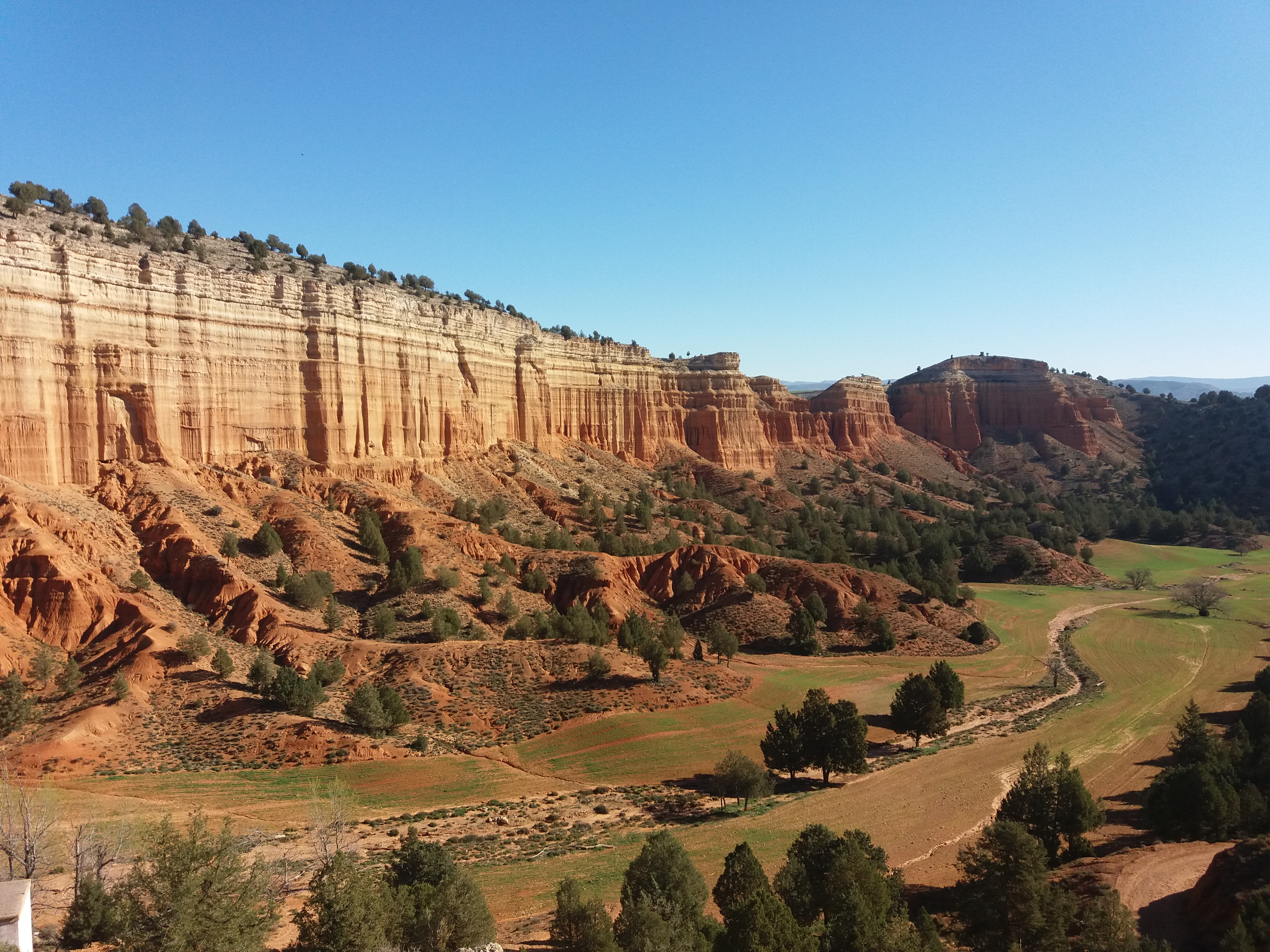
Filming locations in the province of Teruel included the Rambla de Barrachina.

Principal photography took place in Spain and Morocco from May to July 2024. Funding technicalities required part of the film be shot in Spain, and as such locations that could stand in for desert areas in the Moroccan Atlas and Anti-Atlas were actively searched for in the country. Originally Los Monegros was considered as an option, but Laxe was persuaded to shoot instead in the Rambla de Barrachina by the coordinator of the Aragon Film Commission. Laxe described the area as "chiseled by the gods" and the place reportedly gave him ideas to tweak the screenplay.

The production team filmed for a month in the provinces of Teruel and Zaragoza, before moving to Morocco for four weeks, where they filmed near Errachidia and Erfoud. Laxe stated that the production team faced intense heat and sandstorms while filming in Morocco. One particular sandstorm broke most of the equipment and lenses, resulting in extensive reshoots. The film was shot by Mauro Herce on Super 16 mm film.

=== Music ===
The score of Sirāt was composed by electronic musician David Letellier, known professionally as Kangding Ray. It was released by Invada Records on 17 September 2025.

== Release ==
The Match Factory acquired the international sales rights to the film on 6 May 2024. The trailer was released on 6 May 2025. The film had its world premiere in the main competition of the 78th Cannes Film Festival on 15 May 2025.

Sirāt received a theatrical release by BTeam Pictures in Spain on 6 June 2025, grossing around €1.8 million in its first 24 days in theatres. By 7 September 2025, it had grossed a "robust" €2.7 million in the Spanish box office. Distributed by Pyramide Films, it was released in French theatres on 10 September 2025, selling 468,000 tickets over the course of the month.

Following its Cannes premiere, Neon acquired the film for distribution in North America, while Mubi (which owns The Match Factory) acquired it for Italy, Turkey, and India. Altitude acquired rights for the United Kingdom and Ireland, Cine Video y TV for Latin America, Cinéart (The Match Factory's sister company) for the Benelux, Pandora Film for Germany and Austria, Filmcoopi for Switzerland, Transformer for Japan, Challan for South Korea, Andrews Film for Taiwan, Madman Entertainment for Australia and New Zealand, New Horizons for Poland, Triart Film for Sweden, Fidalgo for Norway, Cinema Mondo for Finland, Feelgood Entertainment for Greece, Nitrato Filmes for Portugal, MCF MegaCom for former Yugoslavia, Transilvania Film for Romania, Aerofilms for Czechia and Slovakia, Cirko Film for Hungary, and A-One Films for the Baltic countries. Retrato Filmes scheduled a 26 February 2026 theatrical release in Brazil.

The film's festival run also included selections for screenings at the New Zealand International Film Festival, and the 31st Sarajevo Film Festival. For its North American premiere, Sirāt was screened in the Special Presentations program of the 50th Toronto International Film Festival on 5 September 2025. It also made it to the 73rd San Sebastián International Film Festival in the 'Made in Spain' section, to the lineup of the 20th Fantastic Fest for its U.S. premiere, to the main slate of the 63rd New York Film Festival, to the 2025 Beyond Fest lineup, to the 'Dare' strand of the 69th BFI London Film Festival, to the Santa Fe International Film Festival 2025 lineup, to the international competition of the 61st Chicago International Film Festival, to the 'Gala' selection of the 38th Tokyo International Film Festival, and at the 56th International Film Festival of India.

== Reception ==
=== Critical response ===
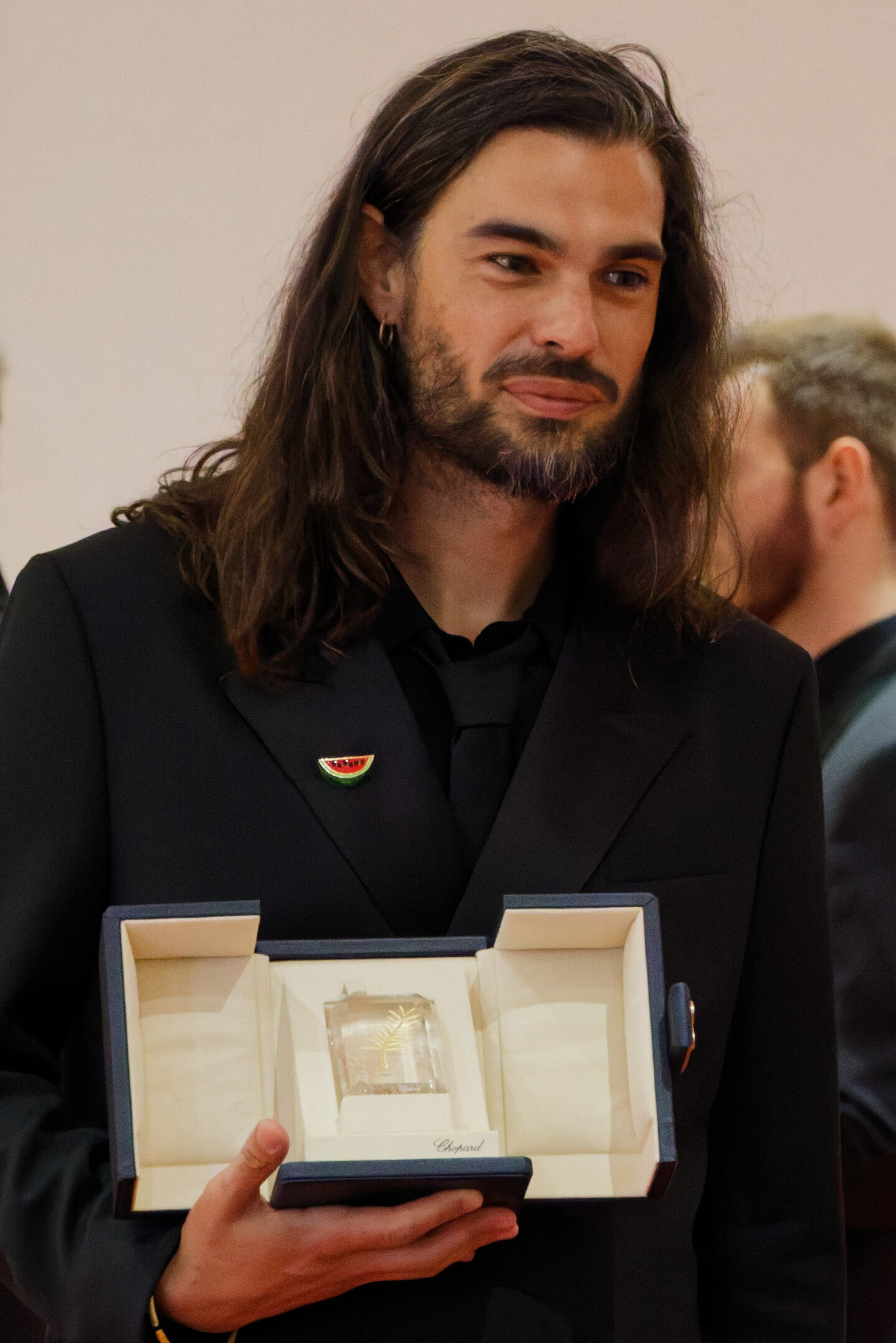
Director Óliver Laxe holding the Jury Prize the 2025 Cannes Film Festival

On the review aggregator website Rotten Tomatoes, 90% of 204 critics' reviews are positive, with an average rating of 8.0/10. The website's consensus reads: "A brutal reminder that the journey can be more important than the destination, Sirât is an unforgettable exercise in tension that wallops its audience like a deafening blast of bass to the face." Metacritic, which uses a weighted average, assigned the film a score of 84 out of 100, based on 35 critics, indicating "universal acclaim". Upon its festival premiere, Sirāt polled as the best film in the 2025 Cannes Critics Survey conducted by IndieWire.

Jessica Kiang of Variety called the film a "brilliantly bizarre, cult-ready vision of human psychology tested to its limits". She praised Mauro Herce's cinematography and Kangding Ray's score. Damon Wise of Deadline wrote, "Part existential road movie, part apocalyptic sci-fi, [the film is] a puzzling mix of Zabriskie Point and Fury Road that starts with a bang but ends in a curiously minor key." He commended Laia Casanova's sound design. Lovia Gyarkye of The Hollywood Reporter echoed these sentiments, praising Casanova's sound design, but noting that the film "gets muddled near the end". David Katz of IndieWire gave Sirāt an 'A-' rating, describing it as belonging to a type of film [that is] "sui generis and evading any classification, emanating from a wholly personal vision of cinema while not resisting galvanizing, and sometimes crowd-pleasing, pleasures". Renaud Baronian of Le Parisien found reminiscences from the Mad Max saga in the film, but also from Lost Highway, The Wages of Fear, Sorcerer, Zabriskie Point, Gerry, and Nomadland. John Bleasdale of Time Out lauded it as "startlingly original, jarringly hilarious and deeply disturbing". Fabien Lemercier of Cineuropa wrote that Laxe "masterfully succeeds in creating an unforgettable [...] experiential film about man and the world, the collective and the individual, being and nothingness, radicality and universality, the intimate and the cosmic." Carlos Boyero of El País described the film as "strange in the best sense".

Manuel J. Lombardo of Diario de Sevilla gave Sirāt four stars, concluding that the film "invites us to a borderline experience from which it is difficult to emerge unscathed or indifferent". For The New Yorker's Justin Chang, what unfolds in between the film's beginning and its conclusion is "an experience of singularly turbulent and transfixing power" unmatched in terms of "sheer visceral excitement and sustained emotional force" in 2025.

In June 2025, IndieWire ranked the film at number 25 on its list of "The 100 Best Movies of the 2020s (So Far)."

=== Top ten lists ===
Sirāt has appeared on the following critics' top ten lists for 2025.

- 1st – Justin Chang, The New Yorker
- 1st – Wendy Ide, Screen International
- 1st – Nikki Baughan, Screen International
- 1st – Lee Marshall, Screen International
- 2nd – Emanuel Levy
- 3rd – Les Inrockuptibles
- 3rd – David Rooney, The Hollywood Reporter
- 4th – David Ehrlich, IndieWire
- 4th – John Waters, Vulture
- 4th – Sight & Sound
- 5th – Tim Grierson, Screen International
- 8th – Film Comment
- 8th – IndieWire Critics Poll
- 8th – Jonathan Romney, Screen International
- 9th – Amy Nicholson, The Los Angeles Times
- 10th – Preston Barta, Dallas Observer
- Top 10 (listed alphabetically) – Jordan Cronk, Sight & Sound
- Top 10 (listed alphabetically) – Ryan Coleman, Entertainment Weekly

=== Accolades ===
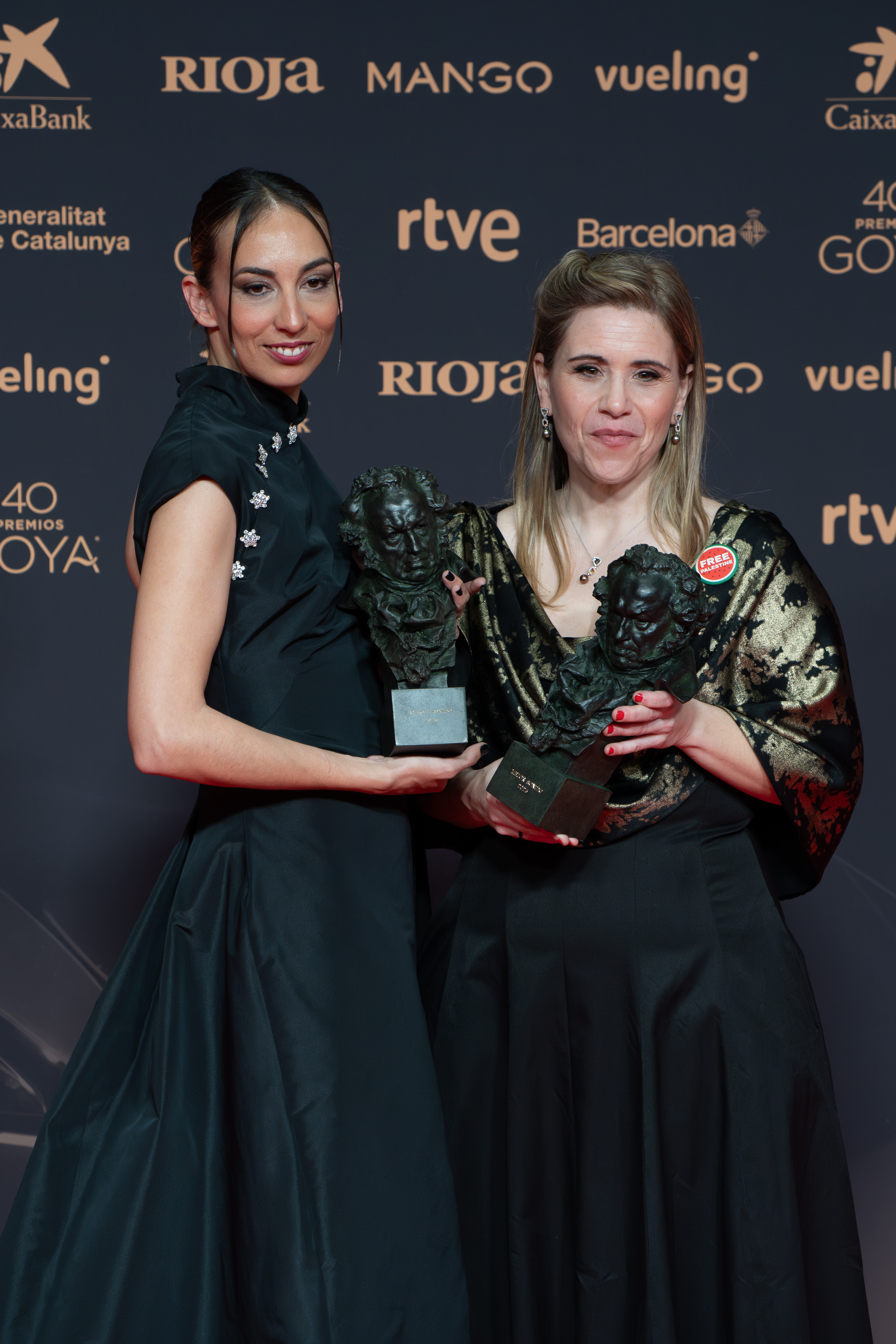
Laia Casanovas and Yasmina Praderas holding their Goya Award for Best Sound

| Award | Date of ceremony | Category | Recipient(s) | Result | Ref. |
|---|---|---|---|---|---|
| Cannes Film Festival | 24 May 2025 | Palme d'Or | Óliver Laxe | Nominated | |
| Cannes Film Festival | 24 May 2025 | Jury Prize | Óliver Laxe | Won | |
| Cannes Film Festival | 24 May 2025 | Prix des Cinémas Art et Essai – Special Mention | Óliver Laxe | Won | |
| Cannes Film Festival | 24 May 2025 | Cannes Soundtrack Award | Kangding Ray | Won | |
| Cannes Film Festival | 24 May 2025 | Palm Dog – Grand Jury Prize | Pipa and Lupita | Won | |
| Chicago International Film Festival | 24 October 2025 | Gold Hugo | Sirāt | Won | |
| Montclair Film Festival | 27 October 2025 | Fiction Feature Prize | Sirāt | Won | |
| National Board of Review | 3 December 2025 | Top Five International Films | Sirāt | Honored | |
| British Independent Film Awards | 30 November 2025 | Best International Independent Film | Óliver Laxe, Santiago Fillol, Domingo Corral, Oriol Maymo, Andrea Queralt, Mani Mortazavi, Xavi Font, Pedro Almodóvar, Agustín Almodóvar and Esther García | Nominated | |
| Gotham Independent Film Awards | 1 December 2025 | Best Director | Óliver Laxe | Nominated | |
| Los Angeles Film Critics Association Awards | 7 December 2025 | Best Music Score | Kangding Ray | Won | |
| Toronto Film Critics Association Awards | 7 December 2025 | Best Director | Óliver Laxe | Runner-up | |
| Toronto Film Critics Association Awards | 7 December 2025 | Best Foreign Language Film | Sirāt | Won | |
| Forqué Awards | 13 December 2025 | Best Film | Sirāt | Nominated | |
| Critics' Choice Awards | 4 January 2026 | Best Foreign Language Film | Sirāt | Nominated | |
| Critics' Choice Awards | 4 January 2026 | Best Sound | Laia Casanovas | Nominated | |
| Astra Film Awards | 9 January 2026 | Best International Feature | Sirāt | Nominated | |
| Palm Springs International Film Festival | 11 January 2026 | FIPRESCI Prize for Best International Feature | Sirāt | Won | |
| Golden Globe Awards | 11 January 2026 | Best Non-English Language Motion Picture | Sirāt | Nominated | |
| Golden Globe Awards | 11 January 2026 | Best Original Score | Kangding Ray | Nominated | |
| European Film Awards | 17 January 2026 | European Film | Domingo Corral, Oliver Laxe, Xavi Font, Pedro Almodóvar, Agustín Almodóvar, Esther García, Oriol Maymó, Mani Mortazavi, Andrea Queralt | Nominated | |
| European Film Awards | 17 January 2026 | European Director | Óliver Laxe | Nominated | |
| European Film Awards | 17 January 2026 | European Actor | Sergi López | Nominated | |
| European Film Awards | 17 January 2026 | European Screenwriter | Santiago Fillol, Oliver Laxe | Nominated | |
| European Film Awards | 17 January 2026 | European Casting Director | Nadia Acimi, Luís Bértolo, María Rodrigo | Won | |
| European Film Awards | 17 January 2026 | European Cinematographer | Mauro Herce | Won | |
| European Film Awards | 17 January 2026 | European Editor | Cristóbal Fernández | Won | |
| European Film Awards | 17 January 2026 | European Production Designer | Laia Ateca | Won | |
| European Film Awards | 17 January 2026 | European Sound Designer | Laia Casanovas | Won | |
| Feroz Awards | 24 January 2026 | Best Drama Film | Sirāt | Nominated | |
| Feroz Awards | 24 January 2026 | Best Director | Oliver Laxe | Nominated | |
| Feroz Awards | 24 January 2026 | Best Screenplay | Oliver Laxe, Santiago Fillol | Nominated | |
| Feroz Awards | 24 January 2026 | Best Main Actor in a Film | Sergi López | Nominated | |
| Feroz Awards | 24 January 2026 | Best Original Soundtrack | Kangding Ray | Won | |
| Feroz Awards | 24 January 2026 | Best Trailer | Aitor Tapia | Won | |
| Feroz Awards | 24 January 2026 | Best Film Poster | Daniel Requena, Alba Vence, Quim Vives | Nominated | |
| London Critics Circle Film Awards | 1 February 2026 | Film of the Year | Sirāt | Nominated | |
| London Critics Circle Film Awards | 1 February 2026 | Foreign Language Film of the Year | Sirāt | Nominated | |
| London Critics Circle Film Awards | 1 February 2026 | Director of the Year | Oliver Laxe | Nominated | |
| London Critics Circle Film Awards | 1 February 2026 | Technical Achievement Award | Laia Casanovas (sound design) | Nominated | |
| Gaudí Awards | 8 February 2026 | Best Non-Catalan Language Film | Sirāt | Won | |
| Gaudí Awards | 8 February 2026 | Best Director | Oliver Laxe | Nominated | |
| Gaudí Awards | 8 February 2026 | Best Actor | Sergi López | Nominated | |
| Gaudí Awards | 8 February 2026 | Best Original Score | Kangding Ray | Won | |
| Gaudí Awards | 8 February 2026 | Best Sound | Amanda Villavieja, Laia Casanovas, Yasmina Praderas | Won | |
| Gaudí Awards | 8 February 2026 | Best Cinematography | Mauro Herce | Won | |
| Gaudí Awards | 8 February 2026 | Best Editing | Cristóbal Fernández | Nominated | |
| Gaudí Awards | 8 February 2026 | Best Art Direction | Laia Ateca | Won | |
| Gaudí Awards | 8 February 2026 | Best Costume Design | Nadia Acimi | Nominated | |
| Gaudí Awards | 8 February 2026 | Best Production Supervision | Oriol Maymó | Won | |
| Gaudí Awards | 8 February 2026 | Best Visual Effects | Pep Claret, Lluís Rivera, Benjamin Ageorges | Won | |
| Gaudí Awards | 8 February 2026 | Best Makeup and Hairstyles | Zaira Eva Adén | Won | |
| Film Independent Spirit Awards | 15 February 2026 | Best International Film | Oliver Laxe | Nominated | |
| Cinema for Peace Awards | 16 February 2026 | Cinema for Peace Dove for The Most Valuable Film of the Year | Sirāt | Nominated | |
| BAFTA Awards | 22 February 2026 | Best Film Not in the English Language | Sirāt | Nominated | |
| CEC Medals | 23 February 2026 | Best Film | Sirāt | Nominated | |
| CEC Medals | 23 February 2026 | Best Director | Oliver Laxe | Nominated | |
| CEC Medals | 23 February 2026 | Best Original Screenplay | Oliver Laxe, Santiago Fillol | Nominated | |
| CEC Medals | 23 February 2026 | Best Actor | Sergi López | Nominated | |
| CEC Medals | 23 February 2026 | Best Cinematography | Mauro Herce | Won | |
| CEC Medals | 23 February 2026 | Best Editing | Cristóbal Fernández | Won | |
| CEC Medals | 23 February 2026 | Best Music | Kangding Ray | Won | |
| César Awards | 26 February 2026 | Best Foreign Film | Sirāt | Nominated | |
| Goya Awards | 28 February 2026 | Best Film | Sirāt | Nominated | |
| Goya Awards | 28 February 2026 | Best Director | Oliver Laxe | Nominated | |
| Goya Awards | 28 February 2026 | Best Original Screenplay | Oliver Laxe, Santiago Fillol | Nominated | |
| Goya Awards | 28 February 2026 | Best Cinematography | Mauro Herce | Won | |
| Goya Awards | 28 February 2026 | Best Original Score | Kangding Ray | Won | |
| Goya Awards | 28 February 2026 | Best Editing | Cristóbal García | Won | |
| Goya Awards | 28 February 2026 | Best Production Supervision | Oriol Maymó | Won | |
| Goya Awards | 28 February 2026 | Best Art Direction | Laia Ateca Font | Won | |
| Goya Awards | 28 February 2026 | Best Makeup and Hairstyles | Zaira Eva Adén | Nominated | |
| Goya Awards | 28 February 2026 | Best Sound | Amanda Villavieja, Laia Casanovas, Yasmina Praderas | Won | |
| Goya Awards | 28 February 2026 | Best Special Effects | Pep Claret, Benjamín Ageorges | Nominated | |
| Polish Film Awards | 9 March 2026 | Best European Film | Oliver Laxe | Won | |
| Academy Awards | 15 March 2026 | Best International Feature Film | Spain | Nominated | |
| Academy Awards | 15 March 2026 | Best Sound | Amanda Villavieja, Laia Casanovas, Yasmina Praderas | Nominated | |
| Mestre Mateo Awards | 21 March 2026 | Best Film | | Won | |
| Mestre Mateo Awards | 21 March 2026 | Best Director | Oliver Laxe | Nominated | |
| Mestre Mateo Awards | 21 March 2026 | Best Screenplay | Oliver Laxe, Santiago Fillol | Nominated | |
| Mestre Mateo Awards | 21 March 2026 | Best Original Score | Kangding Ray | Won | |
| Mestre Mateo Awards | 21 March 2026 | Best Cinematography | Mauro Herce | Nominated | |
| Mestre Mateo Awards | 21 March 2026 | Best Editing | Cristóbal Fernández | Nominated | |
| Mestre Mateo Awards | 21 March 2026 | Best Art Direction | Laia Ateca | Nominated | |
| Mestre Mateo Awards | 21 March 2026 | Best Sound | Amanda Villavieja | Won | |
| Mestre Mateo Awards | 21 March 2026 | Best Costume Design | Nadia Acimi | Nominated | |
| Mestre Mateo Awards | 21 March 2026 | Best Production Supervision | Oriol Maymó | Nominated | |
| Mestre Mateo Awards | 21 March 2026 | Best Makeup and Hairstyles | Zaira Eva Adén | Nominated | |
| Platino Awards | 9 May 2026 | Best Ibero-American Film | Sirat | Nominated | |
| Platino Awards | 9 May 2026 | Best Director | Oliver Laxe | Nominated | |
| Platino Awards | 9 May 2026 | Best Screenplay | Oliver Laxe, Santiago Fillol | Nominated | |
| Platino Awards | 9 May 2026 | Best Cinematography | Mauro Herce | Won | |
| Platino Awards | 9 May 2026 | Best Film Editing | Cristóbal Fernández | Nominated | |
| Platino Awards | 9 May 2026 | Best Sound | Amanda Villavieja, Laia Casanovas, Yasmina Praderas | Won | |
| Platino Awards | 9 May 2026 | Best Special Effects | Pep Claret | Won | |

== See also ==
- List of Spanish films of 2025
- List of French films of 2025
- List of submissions to the 98th Academy Awards for Best International Feature Film
- List of Spanish submissions for the Academy Award for Best International Feature Film
