= José Luis Díaz Sonido para Cine, TV y Publicidad =

Argentine media company

José Luis Díaz Sonido para Cine, TV y Publicidad is an Argentine media company specializing in sound editing for movies, television and advertising, with headquarters located in Buenos Aires.

It was responsible for the sound post-production in Oscar for Best Foreign Language Film winner The Secret in Their Eyes, directed by Juan José Campanella, in 2010; for Guillermo Francella's latest series, El hombre de tu vida, among tens of other audiovisual products; and for Oscar for Best Foreign Language Film nominated "Wild Tales", directed by Damián Szifrón.

It is credited with more than 100 titles in the film industry's profile repository Internet Movie Database.
