= Amanda Villavieja =

Spanish sound engineer

- Born: Barcelona, Spain
- Occupation: Sound engineer

Amanda Villavieja is a Spanish sound engineer. She was nominated for an Academy Award in the category Best Sound for the film Sirāt.

== Selected filmography ==
- Sirāt (2025; co-nominated with Laia Casanovas and Yasmina Praderas)
