= Yasmina Praderas =

Spanish sound engineer

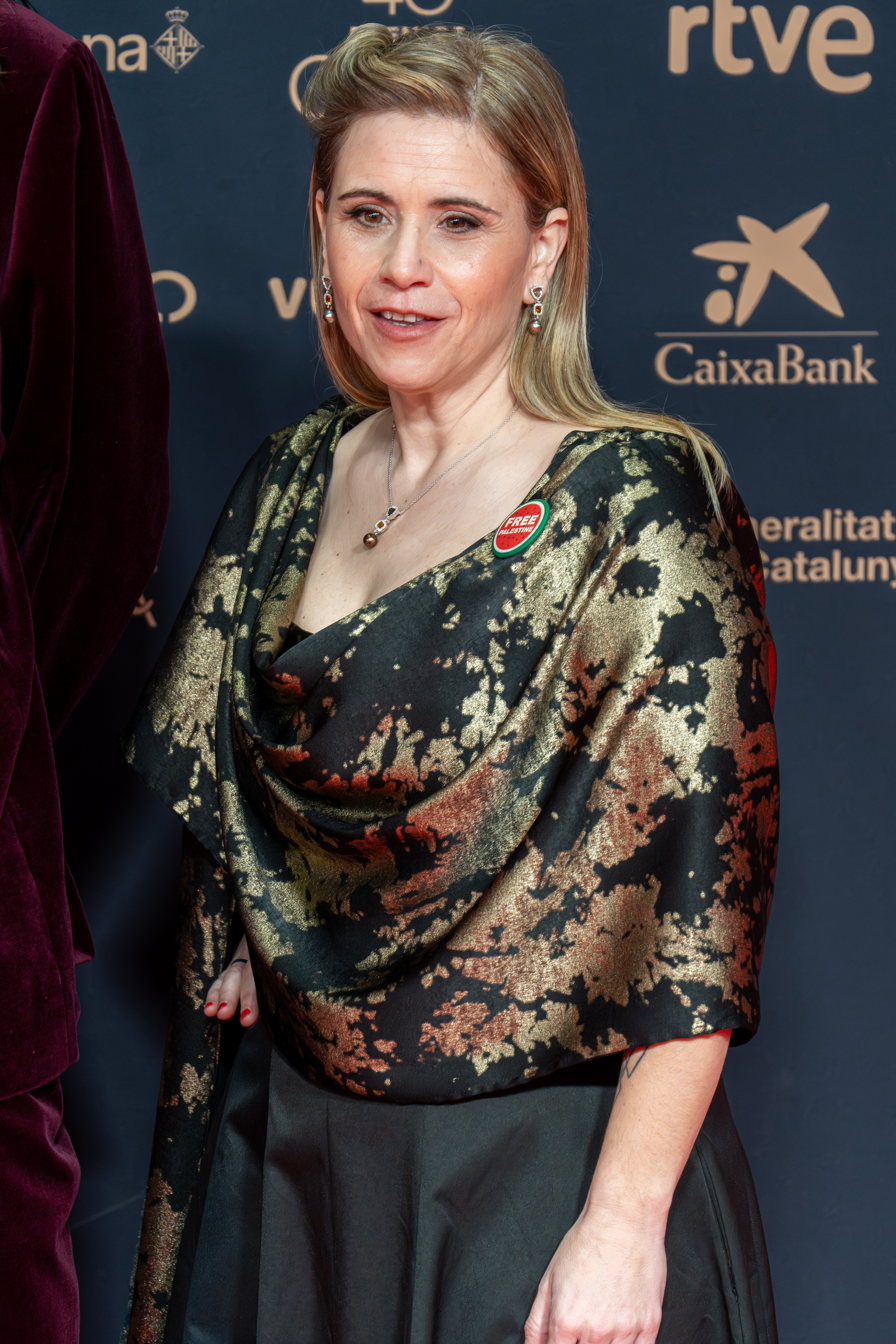
- Praderas in 2026
- Born: 1981; Huesca, Spain
- Occupation: Sound engineer

Yasmina Praderas (born 1981) is a Spanish sound engineer. She was nominated for an Academy Award in the category Best Sound for the film Sirāt.

== Selected filmography ==
- Sirāt (2025; co-nominated with Amanda Villavieja and Laia Casanovas)
