= Laia Casanovas =

Spanish sound editor and engineer

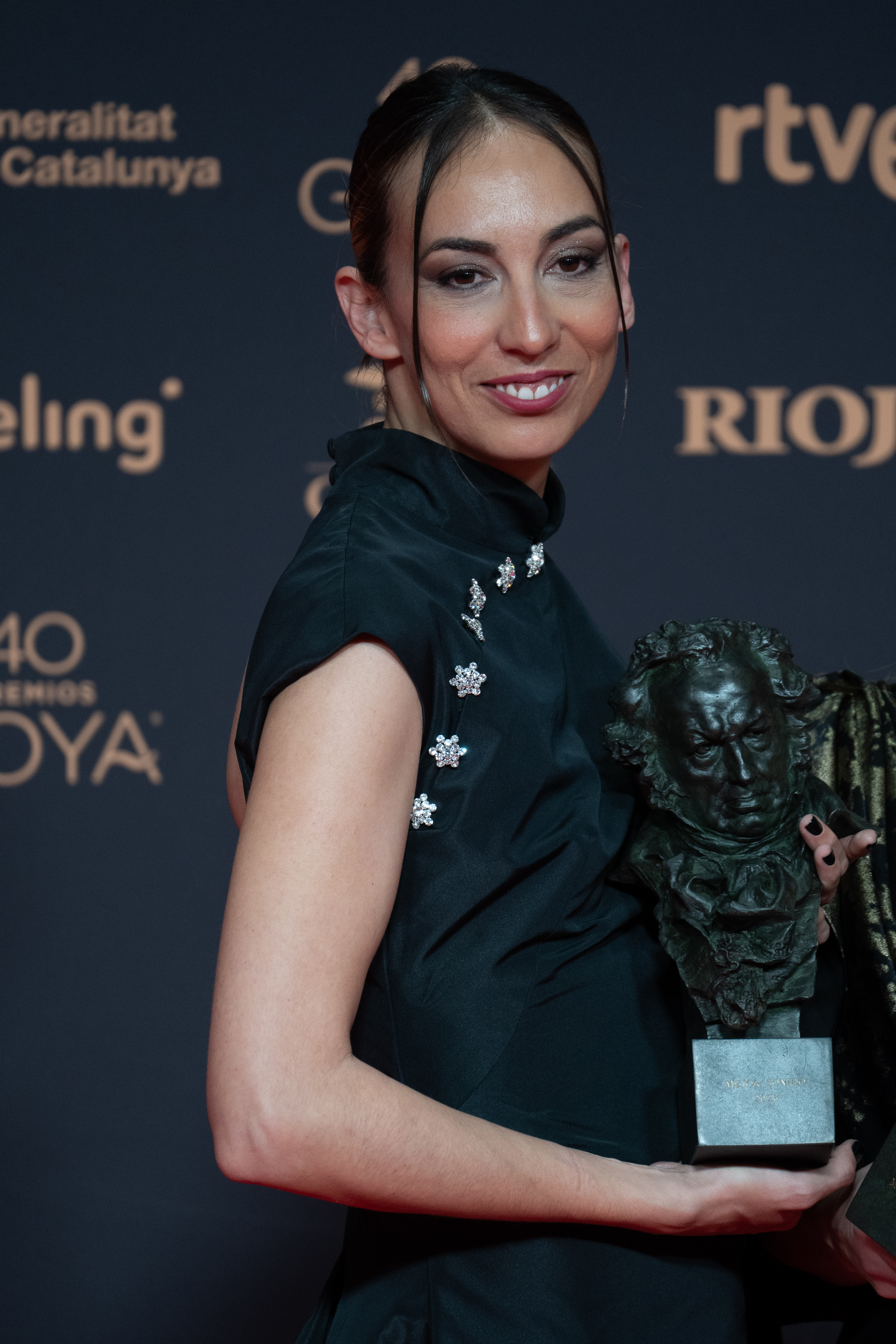
- Casanovas in 2026
- Occupations: Sound editor and engineer

Laia Casanovas is a Spanish sound editor and engineer. She was nominated for an Academy Award in the category Best Sound for the film Sirāt.

== Selected filmography ==
- Sirāt (2025; co-nominated with Amanda Villavieja and Yasmina Praderas)
