= Feroz Awards =

Spanish cinematography awards by the AICE

- Current: 13th Feroz Awards
- Awarded for: Merit and quality in Spanish cinematographic productions
- Country: Spain
- Presented by: Asociación de Informadores Cinematográficos de España (AICE)
- First award: 2014
- Website: https://www.informadoresdecine.es/

The Feroz Awards (Spanish: Premios Feroz) are Spain-based film and television awards presented by the Asociación de Informadores Cinematográficos de España ('Association of Cinematographic Informers of Spain').

Created as film awards, the first edition took place in January 2014. Categories recognizing excellence in television were added for the 4th edition that took place in 2017.

== Categories ==
=== Film ===
- Best Drama Film
- Best Comedy Film
- Best Director
- Best Main Actor in a Film
- Best Main Actress in a Film
- Best Supporting Actor in a Film
- Best Supporting Actress in a Film
- Best Screenplay
- Best Original Soundtrack
- Best Trailer
- Best Film Poster

==== Premio Feroz Especial ====
Premio Feroz Especial is awarded to Spanish films that members of Asociación de Informadores Cinematográficos de España consider deserved better commercial results. Until the 5th edition of the awards, it was a non competitive category; nominations were introduced for the 5th edition.

Edition	Year	Winner	Nominees
1st	2014	Ilusión	No nominees
2nd	2015	Costa da Morte	No nominees
3rd	2016	B, la película	No nominees
4th	2017	La mort de Louis XIV	No nominees
5th	2018	Life and Nothing More	Júlia ist; La mano invisible; Los del túnel; Mimosas
6th	2019	Between Two Waters	Con el viento; Dhogs; El rey; Oreina
7th	2020	Sordo	Boi; La banda; La Virgen de Agosto; Ojos negros
8th	2021	My Mexican Bretzel	The Plan; Red Moon Tide; The Queen of the Lizards; White on White
9th	2022	The Sacred Spirit	¡Corten!; Destello bravío; Karen; The Belly of the Sea
10th	2023	Piety	The Water; My Emptiness and I; Pacifiction; Unicorn Wars
11th	2024	Foremost by Night	Sultana's Dream; The Permanent Picture; The Rye Horn; Teresa
12th	2025	They Will Be Dust	Close to the Sultan; On the Go; As Silence Passes By; A Bright Sun

==== Best Documentary Film ====
Edition	Year	Winner	Nominees
4th	2017	Dead Slow Ahead	No nominees
5th	2018	La Chana	Converso; Esquece Monelos; Muchos hijos, un mono y un castillo; Niñato
6th	2019	Apuntes para una película de atracos	Mudar la piel; The Silence of Others; Trinta lumes; Young & Beautiful
7th	2020	La ciudad oculta	El cuadro; El cuarto reino. El reino de los plásticos; Enero; Zumiriki
8th	2021	The Year of the Discovery	The Challenge: ETA; Courtroom 3H; Dear Werner; In a Whisper
9th	2022	Sedimentos	Del otro lado; Magaluf Ghost Town; Who's Stopping Us; Viaje a alguna parte
10th	2023	La visita y un jardín secreto	Dolores guapa!; A las mujeres de España. María Lejárraga; Cantando en las azoteas; Pico Reja. La verdad que la tierra esconde
11th	2024	La Singla	Ara la llum cau vertical; La mala familia; Mientras seas tú; Samsara
12th	2025	The Human Hibernation	Caja de resistencia; The Undergrowth; Saturno; Zinzindurrunkarratz

=== Television ===
- Feroz Award for Best Drama Series
- Feroz Award for Best Comedy Series
- Feroz Award for Best Main Actor in a Series
- Feroz Award for Best Main Actress in a Series

==== Best Supporting Actor in a Series ====
Edition	Year	Winner	Work	Nominees
4th	2017	Hugo Silva; José Sacristán (Tie)	The Ministry of Time; Velvet	Patrick Criado - Mar de plástico; Jaime Blanch - The Ministry of Time; Julián Villagrán - The Ministry of Time
5th	2018	Miguel Rellán	Vergüenza	Jaime Blanch - The Ministry of Time; Àlex Monner - I Know Who You Are; Alejo Sauras - Estoy vivo; Paco Tous - Money Heist
6th	2019	Antonio Durán "Morris"	Cocaine Coast	Jesús Carroza - El día de mañana; Karra Elejalde - El día de mañana; Miguel Rellán - Vergüenza; Manolo Solo - La peste; Julián Villagrán - Arde Madrid
7th	2020	Enric Auquer	Perfect Life	Jesús Carroza - La peste; Óscar Casas - Instinto; Eduard Fernández - Criminal: Spain; Adam Jezierski - Vota Juan
8th	2021	Patrick Criado	Riot Police	Mikel Laskurain - Patria; Eneko Sagardoy - Patria; Manolo Solo - 30 Coins; Guillermo Toledo - The Minions of Midas
9th	2022	Enric Auquer	Perfect Life	Karra Elejalde - La Fortuna; Adam Jezierski - Venga Juan; Miguel Rellán - Queer You Are; Alberto San Juan - Reyes de la noche
10th	2023	David Lorente	I Don't Like Driving	Jesús Carroza - Offworld; Ricardo Gómez - The Route; Emilio Gutiérrez Caba - ¡García!; Vicente Romero - The Gypsy Bride; Luis Zahera - La unidad
11th	2024	Albert Pla	La mesías	Andreu Buenafuente - The Other Side; Chani Martín - Poquita fe; Biel Rossell Pelfort - La mesías; José Manuel Poga - Burning Body
12th	2025	Pol López	See You in Another Life	Miguel Bernardeau - Querer; Javier Gutiérrez - The Asunta Case; Iván Pellicer - Querer; Manolo Solo - Celeste

==== Best Supporting Actress in a Series ====
Edition	Year	Winner	Work	Nominees
4th	2017	Belén Cuesta	Paquita Salas	Inma Cuevas - Locked Up; Cecilia Freire - Velvet; Cayetana Guillén Cuervo - The Ministry of Time; Alba Flores - Locked Up
5th	2018	Emma Suárez	La zona	Susana Abaitua - I Know Who You Are; Alba Flores - Money Heist; Cayetana Guillén Cuervo - The Ministry of Time; Ana Polvorosa - Las chicas del cable
6th	2019	Anna Castillo	Arde Madrid	Belén Cuesta - Paquita Salas; Fabiana García Lago - Arde Madrid; Debi Mazar - Arde Madrid; Lidia San José - Paquita Salas
7th	2020	Yolanda Ramos	Paquita Salas	Belén Cuesta - Paquita Salas; Celia Freijeiro - Perfect Life; Alba Flores - Money Heist; Aixa Villagrán - Perfect Life
8th	2021	Loreto Mauleón	Patria	Susana Abaitua - Patria; Macarena Gómez - 30 Coins; Carmen Machi - 30 Coins; Paca La Piraña - Veneno
9th	2022	María Pujalte	Venga Juan	Itsaso Arana - Reyes de la noche; Najwa Nimri - Money Heist; Candela Peña - Queer You Are; Yolanda Ramos - Cardo
10th	2023	Patricia López Arnaiz	Intimacy	Marian Álvarez - La unidad; Elisabet Casanovas - The Route; Coria Castillo - Simple; Lucía Veiga - Rapa; Leonor Watling - I Don't Like Driving
11th	2024	Irene Balmes	La mesías	Amaia - La mesías; Tamara Casellas - The Left-Handed Son; Julia de Castro - Poquita fe; Carmen Machi - La mesías
12th	2025	Nora Navas	I, Addict	Tamara Casellas - See You in Another Life; María León - The Asunta Case; Loreto Mauleón - Querer; Clara Sans - Celeste

==== Best Screenplay in a Series ====
Edition	Year	Winner	Nominees
10th	2023	The Route	Offworld; Autodefensa; Simple; Intimacy
11th	2024	La mesías	Burning Body; The Left-Handed Son; The Other Side; Poquita fe
12th	2025	Querer	Celeste; The New Years; See You in Another Life; I, Addict

=== Feroz de Honor (Honorary Award) ===
Edition	Year	Winner
1st	2014	José Sacristán
2nd	2015	Carlos Saura
3rd	2016	Rosa María Sardà
4th	2017	Narciso Ibáñez Serrador
5th	2018	Verónica Forqué
6th	2019	José Luis Cuerda
7th	2020	Julia Gutiérrez Caba and Emilio Gutiérrez Caba
8th	2021	Victoria Abril
9th	2022	Cecilia Bartolomé
10th	2023	Pedro Almodóvar
11th	2024	Mónica Randall
12th	2025	Jaime Chávarri

== Ceremonies ==
Edition	Year	Date	Venue	Hosted by
1st	2014	27 January	Cine Callao, Madrid	Alexandra Jiménez
2nd	2015	25 January	Gran Teatro Ruedo Las Ventas, Madrid	Bárbara Santa-Cruz
3rd	2016	19 January	Teatro Príncipe Pío, Madrid	Silvia Abril
4th	2017	23 January	Palacete de los Duques de Pastrana, Madrid	Antonio de la Torre
5th	2018	22 January	Polideportivo Antonio Magariños, Madrid	Julián López
6th	2019	19 January	Bilbao Arena, Bilbao	Ingrid García-Jonsson
7th	2020	16 January	Teatro Auditorio Ciudad de Alcobendas, Alcobendas	María Hervás
8th	2021	2 March	Teatro Coliseum, Madrid	Pilar Castro
9th	2022	29 January	Auditorio de Zaragoza, Zaragoza	Nacho Vigalondo and Paula Púa
10th	2023	28 January	Auditorio de Zaragoza, Zaragoza	Paula Púa, Bárbara Santa-Cruz, Ingrid García-Jonsson, Silvia Abril, Nacho Vigalondo, Pilar Castro
11th	2024	26 January	Palacio Vistalegre Arena, Madrid	Coria Castillo, Brays Efe
12th	2025	25 January	Recinto Ferial de Pontevedra, Pontevedra	La Dani

== See also ==
- Goya Awards
