= 34th Actors and Actresses Union Awards =

Spanish awards ceremony in 2025

- Date: 16 March 2026
- Site: Circo Price, Madrid, Spain
- Hosted by: Anna Coll; Jorge Basanta
- Organized by: Actors and Actresses Union

The 34th Actors and Actresses Union Awards ceremony took place on 16 March 2026 at the Circo Price in Madrid. The gala was hosted by Anna Coll and Jorge Basanta.

In advance of the ceremony, Antonio Resines was announced as the winner of the 'Toda una vida' life achievement career award while the film The Voice of Hind Rajab was announced as the recipient of the Special Award. Pedro Almodóvar received the 'Mujeres en Unión' award.

== Winners and nominees ==
The winners and nominees are listed as follows:

=== Film ===
Best Male Performance in a Leading Role: José Ramón Soroiz — Maspalomas; Alberto San Juan — The Dinner; Mario Casas — Away	Best Female Performance in a Leading Role: Patricia López Arnaiz — Sundays; Ángela Cervantes — Fury; Susana Abaitua — She Walks in Darkness
Best Male Performance in a Secondary Role: Álvaro Cervantes — Deaf; Tristán Ulloa — Romería; Miguel Garcés — Sundays	Best Female Performance in a Secondary Role: Nagore Aranburu — Sundays; Elena Irureta — Deaf; Miryam Gallego — Romería
Best Male Performance in a Minor Role: Víctor Sáinz — Sundays; Fernando Tejero — The Captive; Carlos Serrano — The Dinner	Best Female Performance in a Minor Role: Elvira Mínguez — The Dinner; Anna Castillo — Wolfgang; Mabel Rivera — Sundays

=== Television ===
Best Male Performance in a Leading Role: Álvaro Morte — The Anatomy of a Moment; Javier Cámara — Jakarta; Secun de la Rosa — Superstar	Best Female Performance in a Leading Role: Ingrid García-Jonsson — Superstar; Carolina Yuste — La canción; Carla Quílez — Jakarta
Best Male Performance in a Secondary Role: David Lorente — The Anatomy of a Moment; Carlos Bardem — La agencia; Carlos González — La vida breve	Best Female Performance in a Secondary Role: María Jesús Hoyos — Little Faith; Candela Peña — Rage; Leonor Watling — La vida breve
Best Male Performance in a Minor Role: Felipe Andrés — Little Faith; Miki Esparbé — The Anatomy of a Moment; Héctor Carballo — La vida breve	Best Female Performance in a Minor Role: Natalia Huarte — Ena. Queen Victoria Eugenia; Alejandra Onieva — The Anatomy of a Moment; Susana Hernáiz — Sueños de libertad

=== Theatre ===
Best Male Performance in a Leading Role: Daniel Albaladejo — The Lady from Trevélez; Carlos Hipólito — Música para Hitler; Juan Vinuesa — 1936	Best Female Performance in a Leading Role: Irene Escolar — People, Places and Things; Toni Acosta — Una madre de película; Nathalie Poza — A Streetcar Named Desire
Best Male Performance in a Secondary Role: Cristóbal Suárez — Música para Hitler; Jimmy Castro — La patética; José Luis Torrijo — Los lunes al sol	Best Female Performance in a Secondary Role: Mina El Hammani — The Trojan Women; Kiti Mánver — Música para Hitler; Mariola Peña — Cenicienta, el musical
Best Male Performance in a Minor Role: Víctor Clavijo — Blaubeeren; Néstor Rubio — Iphigenia; Mariano Estudillo — Fuenteovejuna	Best Female Performance in a Minor Role: Ania Hernández — Numancia; Belén Ponce de León — Vulcano; Julia Piera — The Lady from Trévelez

=== Newcomers ===
Best New Actor: Julio Peña — The Captive; Hugo Welzel — Enemies; Aarón Cobos — Godspell	Best New Actress: Miriam Garlo — Deaf; Blanca Soroa — Sundays; Nora Hernández — The Dinner

=== International productions ===
Best Male Performance in an International Production: Alberto Ammann — Caught; Jordi Mollà — The Life List; Rubén Sanz — Isla brava	Best Female Performance in an International Production: Carla Díaz — Delicious; Lucía Barrado — Fall for Me; Sara Jiménez — Mango
