= Fate (TV series) =

2025 Spanish television series

- Spanish: La suerte
- Written by: Borja González Santaolalla; Diana Rojo
- Directed by: Paco Plaza; Paco Guerrero
- Starring: Óscar Jaenada; Ricardo Gómez

Production
- Cinematography: Pablo Rosso
- Production company: Boomerang TV

Original release
- Network: Disney+

Fate (Spanish: La suerte) is a Spanish comedy television series directed by Paco Plaza and Paco Guerrero. Set against the backdrop of bullfighting, it stars Ricardo Gómez and Óscar Jaenada.

== Plot ==
The plot explores the odd friendship between a shy young man preparing the tests to apply for public office while working as part-time taxi driver and a master bullfighter at a low ebb.

== Cast ==
- Ricardo Gómez as David
- Óscar Jaenada as "el Maestro"
- Carlos Bernardino
- Óscar Higares
- Pedro Bachura
- Jason Fernández
- Óscar Reyes
- Almudena Amor
- Almudena Cid
- Diana Peñalver
- Aria Bedmar
- Manuel Morón

== Production ==
Fate is a Boomerang TV production for Disney+. Shooting locations included the bullrings of Las Ventas, La Misericordia, La Malagueta, and La Caprichosa.

== Release ==
For its world premiere, Fate made it to a non-competitive special screening slot of the 73rd San Sebastián International Film Festival's official selection, and it was presented on 24 September 2025.

The six episodes premiered on Disney+ on 8 October 2025.

== Accolades ==
Year	Award	Category	Nominee(s)	Result	Ref.
2026	13th Feroz Awards	Best Comedy Series		Nominated	
2026	13th Feroz Awards	Best Main Actor in a Series	Ricardo Gómez	Nominated	
2026	13th Feroz Awards	Best Supporting Actor in a Series	Carlos Bernardino	Nominated	

== See also ==
- 2025 in Spanish television
