= 13th Feroz Awards =

Spanish film and television awards

- Date: 24 January 2026
- Site: Pontevedra Auditorium and Convention Centre, Pontevedra, Spain
- Hosted by: Petra Martínez; Samantha Hudson; Antonio Durán "Morris"; Elisabet Casanovas
- Organized by: Asociación de Informadores Cinematográficos de España

Highlights
- Most awards: Film: Sundays (5); Series: Little Faith and Jakarta (3)
- Most nominations: Film: Sundays (9); Series: Superstar & Little Faith (6)

Television coverage
- Network: La 2
- Viewership: 0.44 million (4.4%)

The 13th Feroz Awards ceremony, presented by the Asociación de Informadores Cinematográficos de España (AICE), took place on 24 January 2026 at the Pontevedra Auditorium and Convention Centre.

== Background ==
The reported set of gala hosts consisted of Petra Martínez, Samantha Hudson, Antonio Durán "Morris", and Elisabet Casanovas.

On 17 November 2025, AICE announced actress Marta Fernández-Muro as the recipient of the Honorary Feroz Award, presenting her as "an expert scene-stealer and an essential face of Spanish cinema in the 1980s". A week later, AICE announced the shortlist of candidates for the 'Arrebato' Fiction Award (Aro berria, Balearic, Sleepless City, Decorado, The Heaven of Animals, Emergency Exit, Strange River, Gaua, Jone, Sometimes, The Exiles, Silence, Sirāt, Superstar, The Stepmother's Bond, and A Whale) and the shortlist of candidates for the 'Holded Arrebato' Non-Fiction Award (To Our Friends, Atín Aya. Retrato del silencio, Constelación Portabella, El último arrebato, Ellas en la ciudad, Erreplika, Fandango, Filmei paxaros voando, Hija del volcán, La marsellesa de los borrachos, Madrid, Ext., Pendaripen, Quién vio los templos caer, Afternoons of Solitude, and Un hombre libre).

The main film and series nominations were read by Milena Smit and Manu Ríos on 27 November 2025. The nominations for the 'Arrebato' fiction and non-fiction categories were announced on 11 December 2025.

Broadcast on La 2, the ceremony had 438,000 viewers on linear television (4.4% audience share).

== Nominations ==
The winners and nominees are listed as follows:

=== Film ===
Best Drama Film: Sundays — Marisa Fernández Armenteros, Sandra Hermida, Nahikari Ipiña, Manu Calvo (producers); Maspalomas — Ander Barinaga-Rementeria, Ander Sagardoy Múgica, Fernando Larrondo, Xabier Berzosa (producers); Romería — María Zamora, Olimpia Pont Cháfer, Àngels Masclans (producers); Sirāt — Agustín Almodóvar, Esther García, Oriol Maymó, Xavi Font (producers); Deaf — Miriam Porté, Nuria Muñoz Ortín, Adolfo Blanco, Gerard Marginedas (producers)	Best Comedy Film: The Dinner — Cristóbal García, Lina Badenes, Roberto Butragueño (producers); Decorado — Chelo Loureiro, Iván Miñambres, Jose María Fernández de Vega, Nuno Beato (producers); My Friend Eva — Marta Esteban, Laia Bosch (producers); Band Together — Ramón Campos, Victor Fandiño (producers); Wolfgang — Núria Valls, Marta Sánchez de Miguel, Gerard Verdaguer, Ghislain Barrois (producers)
Best Director: Alauda Ruiz de Azúa — Sundays; Jose Mari Goenaga, Aitor Arregi — Maspalomas; Oliver Laxe — Sirāt; Eva Libertad — Deaf; Carla Simón — Romería	Best Screenplay in a Film: Alauda Ruiz de Azúa — Sundays; Jose Mari Goenaga — Maspalomas; Carla Simón — Romería; Oliver Laxe, Santiago Fillol — Sirāt; Eva Libertad — Deaf
Best Main Actor in a Film: José Ramón Soroiz — Maspalomas as Vicente; Mario Casas — Away as Sergio; Álvaro Cervantes — Deaf as Héctor; Sergi López — Sirāt as Luis; Alberto San Juan — The Dinner as Genaro	Best Main Actress in a Film: Patricia López Arnaiz — Sundays as Maite; Ángela Cervantes — Fury as Alexandra; Miriam Garlo — Deaf as Ángela; Nora Navas — My Friend Eva as Eva; Blanca Soroa — Sundays as Ainara
Best Supporting Actor in a Film: Kandido Uranga — Maspalomas as Xanti; Asier Etxeandia — The Dinner as Alonso; Miguel Garcés — Sundays as Iñaki; Joaquín Núñez — Los Tigres as Gordo; Miguel Rellán —The Captive as Antonio de Sosa	Best Supporting Actress in a Film: Nagore Aranburu — Sundays as madre priora Isabel; Iraia Elias — She Walks in Darkness as Begoña; Elena Irureta — Deaf as Elvira; Maria de Medeiros — The Portuguese House as Amalia; Elvira Mínguez — The Dinner as Juana
Best Original Soundtrack: Kangding Ray — Sirāt; Alejandro Amenábar — The Captive; Hidrogenesse (Carlos Ballesteros & Genís Segarra) — Daniela Forever; Aránzazu Calleja — Maspalomas; Ernest Pipó — Romería	Best Trailer: Aitor Tapia — Sirāt; Alberto de Toro — The Dinner; Mikel Garmilla — Maspalomas; Aitor Tapia, Manel Barriere — Sundays; Miguel Ángel Trudu — Romería
Best Film Poster: Ana Domínguez, Rafa Castañer — Afternoons of Solitude; Jimena Merino, Álvaro León, Luis León, David Herranz — Sundays; Dan Petris, Jaume Caldés — Away; Jose A. Peña, Quim Vives — Romería; Daniel Requena, Alba Vence, Quim Vives — Sirāt

==== Films with multiple nominations and awards ====
Films with multiple nominations
Nominations	Film
9	Sundays
7	Sirāt
7	Maspalomas
6	Romería
6	Deaf
5	The Dinner
2	The Captive
2	Away

Films with multiple awards
Awards	Film
5	Sundays
2	Sirāt
2	Maspalomas

=== Television ===
Best Drama Series: Jakarta — Fran Araújo, Diego San José, Alejandro Flórez, Javier Méndez (producers); The Anatomy of a Moment — José Manuel Lorenzo, Domingo Corral, Manuela Ocón Aburto, Fran Araújo (producers); La canción — Susana Herreras, Fran Araújo, Pepe Coira, Ignacio Corrales (producers); Pubertat - Secrets, Lies, and Human Castles — Oriol Maymó, Miriam Porté (producers); La ruta Vol 2: Ibiza — Montse García, Nacho Lavilla, Eduardo Villanueva (producers)	Best Comedy Series: Little Faith — Juan Maidagán, Pepón Montero, Fran Araújo, Pepe Ripoll (producers); Old Dog, New Tricks — Aitor Gabilondo, Jota Aceytuno (producers); Rage — Santi Botello, Tedy Villalba Jr., Antonio Trashorras, José María Caro (producers); Fate — Sofía Fábregas, Luis Santamaría, Pablo Guerrero, Paco Plaza (producers); Superstar — Javier Ambrossi, Javier Calvo (producers); La vida breve — Cristóbal Garrido, Adolfo Valor, Antonio Asensio, Susana Herreras (producers)
Best Main Actor in a Series: Javier Cámara — Jakarta as José Ramón "Joserra" Garrido; Raúl Cimas — Little Faith as José Ramón; Ricardo Gómez — Fate as David Santamaría López; Álvaro Morte — The Anatomy of a Moment as Adolfo Suárez; Luis Zahera — Old Dog, New Tricks as Antón	Best Main Actress in a Series: Esperanza Pedreño — Little Faith as Berta; Anna Castillo — Su majestad as Pilar; Ingrid García-Jonsson — Superstar as Marimar Cuena Seisdedos / Tamara / Yurena; Candela Peña — Rage as Nat; Carla Quílez — Jakarta as Mar; Carolina Yuste — La canción as Massiel
Best Supporting Actor in a Series: Secun de la Rosa — Superstar as Leonardo Dantés; Carlos Bernardino — Fate as Jerónimo "Jero" Martín; Eduard Fernández — The Anatomy of a Moment as Santiago Carrillo; David Lorente — Jakarta as Millán; Manolo Solo — The Anatomy of a Moment as Manuel Gutiérrez Mellado	Best Supporting Actress in a Series: Julia de Castro — Little Faith as Berta's sister; María Jesús Hoyos — Little Faith as Berta's mother; Rocío Ibáñez — Superstar as Margarita Seisdedos; Natalia de Molina — Superstar as Loly Álvarez; Betsy Túrnez — Pubertat as Estel Moreno; Leonor Watling — La vida breve as Isabel de Farnesio
Best Screenplay in a Series: Diego San José, Daniel Castro, Fernando Delgado-Hierro — Jakarta; Rafael Cobos, Fran Araújo, Alberto Rodríguez — The Anatomy of a Moment; Félix Sabroso, Juan Flahn — Rage; Juan Maidagán, Pepón Montero — Little Faith; Nacho Vigalondo, María Bastarós, Paco Bezerra, Claudia Costafreda — Superstar

==== Series with multiple nominations ====
Series with multiple nominations
Nominations	Series
6	Superstar
6	Little Faith
5	The Anatomy of a Moment
5	Jakarta
3	Fate
3	Rage
2	Old Dog, New Tricks
2	La canción
2	Pubertat - Secrets, Lies, and Human Castles
2	La vida breve

Series with multiple awards
Awards	Film
3	Jakarta
3	Little Faith

=== Honorific awards ===
Honorary Feroz Award: Marta Fernández-Muro
'Arrebato' Special Award (Fiction): Sleepless City; Aro berria; Strange River; Silence; The Exiles	'Holded Arrebato' Special Award (non-Fiction): Afternoons of Solitude; To Our Friends; Ellas en la ciudad; Filmei paxaros voando; Madrid, Ext.
