= 31st Forqué Awards =

2025 Spanish film and television awards

- Date: 13 December 2025
- Site: IFEMA Palacio Municipal, Madrid, Spain
- Hosted by: Cayetana Guillén Cuervo; Daniel Guzmán
- Organized by: EGEDA

Television coverage
- Network: La 2; RTVE Play
- Viewership: 0.32 million (3.1%)

The 31st Forqué Awards ceremony, for film and television, presented by EGEDA took place at the IFEMA Palacio Municipal in Madrid on 13 December 2025. The gala was hosted by Cayetana Guillén Cuervo and Daniel Guzmán.

== Background ==
The nominations were announced on 5 November 2025. Later in the month, producer Emma Lustres was announced as the recipient of the EGEDA Gold Medal. La 2 and RTVE Play will broadcast the ceremony. The musical performances included "Ojos verdes" by Ruth Lorenzo, "Nada de nada" by Amaral and Mafalda Cardenal, "Toda una vida" by Chanel and Nil Moliner, "Porque te vas" by Jeanette and Chloé Bird, "Quisiera ser" by Marwán and Cayetana Guillén Cuervo and "Más bonita que ninguna" by Shaila Dúrcal.

== Winners and nominees ==
The winners and nominees are listed as follows:

Best Fiction Film: Sundays; Sirāt; Maspalomas; Deaf	Best Fiction Series: The Anatomy of a Moment; Old Dog, New Tricks; Little Faith (S2); Pubertat
Best Male Performance in a Film: José Ramón Soroiz — Maspalomas; Alberto San Juan — The Dinner; Mario Casas — Away; Álvaro Cervantes — Deaf	Best Female Performance in a Film: Patricia López Arnaiz — Sundays; Nora Navas — My Friend Eva; Ángela Cervantes — Fury; Miriam Garlo — Deaf
Best Male Performance in a Series: Javier Cámara — Jakarta; Álvaro Morte — The Anatomy of a Moment; Luis Zahera — Old Dog, New Tricks; Raúl Cimas — Little Faith (S2)	Best Female Performance in a Series: Esperanza Pedreño — Little Faith (S2); Candela Peña — Rage; Carolina Yuste — La canción; Ingrid García-Jonsson — Superstar
Best Documentary Film: Flores para Antonio; 2025. Todos somos Gaza; Eloy de la Iglesia. Adicto al Cine; Afternoons of Solitude	Best Latin-American Film: Belén; The Mysterious Gaze of the Flamingo; The Wave; Papers
Best Short Film: Ángulo muerto; El cuento de una noche de verano; Una cabeza en la pared	Best Animation Film: Decorado; Awakening Beauty; The Treasure of Barracuda; The Light of Aisha
Cinema and Education in Values: Deaf; Enemies; Sundays; Maspalomas

=== Audience Award ===
- The Captive

=== EGEDA Gold Medal ===
- Emma Lustres
