= In a Whisper =

In a Whisper may refer to:

- In a Whisper (2019 film), directed by Heidi Hassan and Patricia Pérez
- In a Whisper (2026 film), directed by Leyla Bouzid
