= Maspalomas (film) =

- Theatrical release poster
- Directed by: Jose Mari Goenaga; Aitor Arregi
- Screenplay by: Jose Mari Goenaga
- Produced by: Ander Barinaga-Rementeria; Xabier Berzosa; Ander Sagardoy; Fernando Larrondo
- Starring: José Ramón Soroiz; Nagore Aranburu; Kandido Uranga
- Cinematography: Javi Agirre Erauso
- Edited by: Maialen Sarasua Oliden
- Music by: Aránzazu Calleja
- Production companies: Irusoin; Moriarti; Maspalomas pelikula AIE
- Distributed by: BTeam Pictures
- Release dates: 21 September 2025 (Zinemaldia); 26 September 2025 (Spain)
- Country: Spain
- Language: Basque

Maspalomas is a 2025 Spanish drama film directed by Jose Mari Goenaga and Aitor Arregi. It stars José Ramón Soroiz alongside Nagore Aranburu.

The film was presented at the 73rd San Sebastián International Film Festival on 21 September 2025 ahead of its 26 September 2025 theatrical release in Spain by BTeam Pictures. Soroiz won Best Actor at the 40th Goya Awards for his work in the film as an elder gay man choosing to go back into the closet.

== Plot ==
After experiencing a carefree living in Maspalomas as an openly gay man, 76-year-old Vicente needs to return to San Sebastián after a stroke, reuniting with his daughter (whom he abandoned years prior), being forced to join a conservative nursing home. The new context leads Vicente to choose to go back into the closet.

== Cast ==
- José Ramón Soroiz as Vicente
- Nagore Aranburu as Nerea
- Kandido Uranga as Xanti
- Zorion Eguileor as Ramon
- Kepa Errasti as Iñaki

== Production ==
The original screenplay was written by Jose Mari Goenaga. The film is an Irusoin, Moriarti, and Maspalomas pelikula AIE production with the participation of ICAA, RTVE, EiTB and the Basque Government. Shooting locations included Orduña, Gipuzkoa, and the Canary Islands.

== Release ==
Maspalomas will be presented at the 73rd San Sebastián International Film Festival in September 2025, in competition for the Golden Shell. Distributed by BTeam Pictures, it was released theatrically in Spain on 26 September 2025. Its festival run included selections for screenings as the opening film of the 30th Toulouse Spanish Film Festival (Cinespaña), and in the 'Special Presentations' programme of the 2025 BFI London Film Festival. Film Factory handled international sales.

== Reception ==
Ricardo Rosado of Fotogramas rated the film 4 out of 5 stars, declaring it an "ode to hope, to the possibility of accepting oneself at any moment in life and overcoming relapses as many times as necessary", singling out the care and truth with which Soroiz infuses all the stages of his character as the best thing about the film.

Neil Young of Sight & Sound deemed the film to be "a well-crafted affair" (although "not especially cinematic in its style"), "built around an empathetic and involving performance by Soroiz".

Ekaitz Ortega of HobbyConsolas gave the film 84 points ('very good'), highlighting an "outstanding" Soroiz and how the film "is sincere and does not avoid the most awkward corners".

== Accolades ==
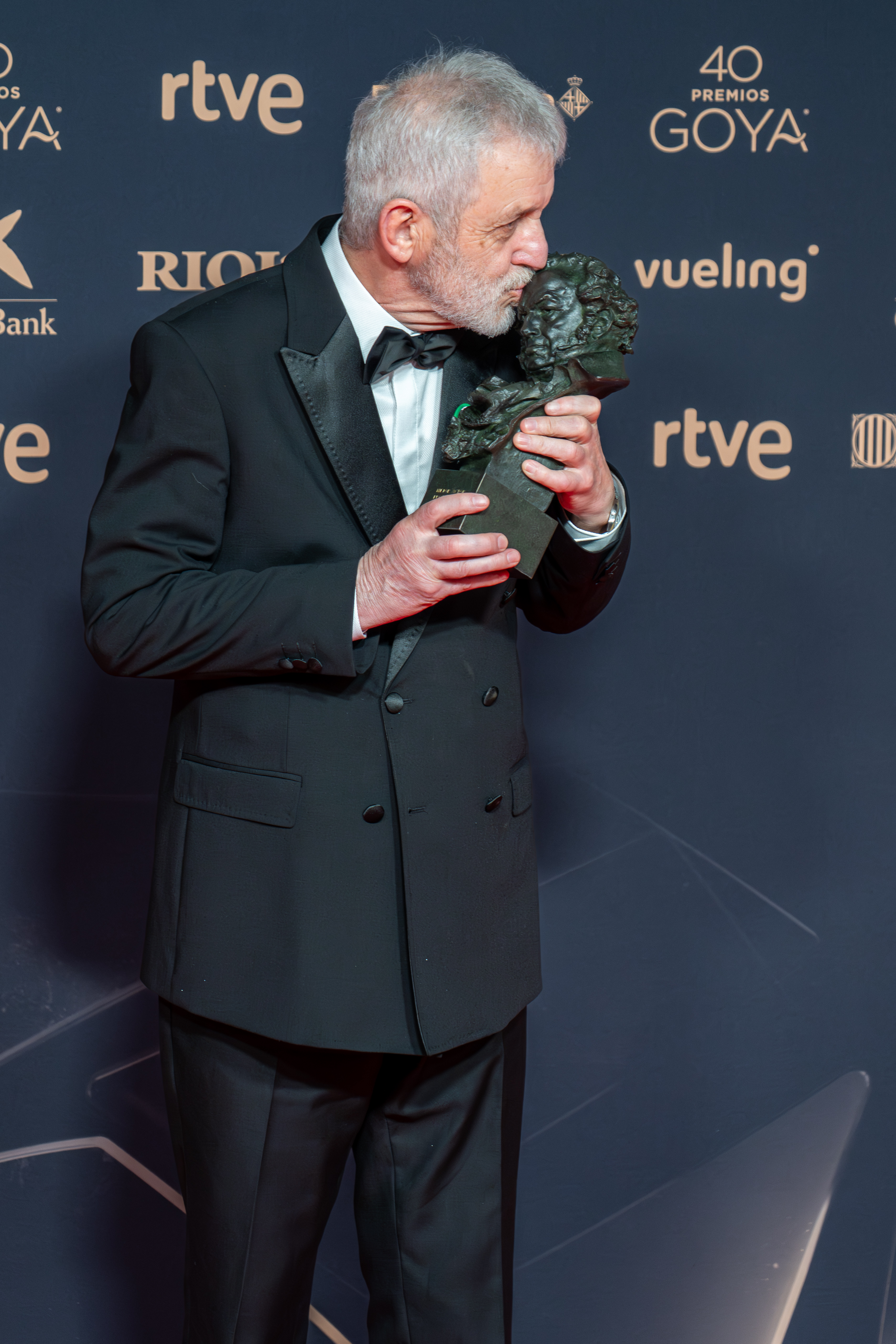
Soroiz kissing his Goya Award for Best Actor

Year	Award	Category	Nominee(s)	Result	Ref.
2025	73rd San Sebastián International Film Festival	Golden Shell		Nominated	
2025	73rd San Sebastián International Film Festival	Silver Shell for Best Leading Performance	Jose Ramon Soroiz	Won	
2025	73rd San Sebastián International Film Festival	Sebastiane Award		Won	
2025	31st Forqué Awards	Best Film		Nominated	
2025	31st Forqué Awards	Best Actor in a Film	José Ramón Soroiz	Won	
2025	31st Forqué Awards	Cinema and Education in Values		Nominated	
2026	13th Feroz Awards	Best Drama Film		Nominated	
2026	13th Feroz Awards	Best Director	Jose Mari Goenaga, Aitor Arregi	Nominated	
2026	13th Feroz Awards	Best Screenplay	Jose Mari Goenaga	Nominated	
2026	13th Feroz Awards	Best Main Actor in a Film	Jose Ramon Soroiz	Won	
2026	13th Feroz Awards	Best Supporting Actor in a Film	Kandido Uranga	Won	
2026	13th Feroz Awards	Best Original Soundtrack	Aránzazu Calleja	Nominated	
2026	13th Feroz Awards	Best Trailer	Mikel Garmilla	Nominated	
2026	5th Carmen Awards	Best Non-Andalusian Produced Film		Nominated	
2026	81st CEC Medals	Best Film		Nominated	
2026	40th Goya Awards	Best Film		Nominated	
2026	40th Goya Awards	Best Director	Aitor Arregi, Jose Mari Goenaga	Nominated	
2026	40th Goya Awards	Best Original Screenplay	Jose Mari Goenaga	Nominated	
2026	40th Goya Awards	Best Actor	Jose Ramon Soroiz	Won	
2026	40th Goya Awards	Best Supporting Actor	Kandido Uranga	Nominated	
2026	40th Goya Awards	Best Cinematography	Javier Aguirre Erauso	Nominated	
2026	40th Goya Awards	Best Original Score	Aránzazu Calleja	Nominated	
2026	40th Goya Awards	Best Art Direction	Mikel Serrano	Nominated	
2026	40th Goya Awards	Best Makeup and Hairstyles	Karmele Soler, Sergio Pérez Berbel	Nominated	
2026	34th Actors and Actresses Union Awards	Best Film Actor in a Leading Role	José Ramón Soroiz	Won	
2026	9th ALMA Awards	Best Screenplay in a Drama Film	Jose Mari Goenaga	Nominated	
2026	29th Sonoma International Film Festival	Grand Jury Award — Best Narrative Feature		Won	

== See also ==
- List of Spanish films of 2025
