= The Dinner (2025 film) =

- Theatrical release poster
- Spanish: La cena
- Directed by: Manuel Gómez Pereira
- Written by: Joaquín Oristrell; Yolanda García Serrano; Manuel Gómez Pereira
- Based on: La cena de los generales by José Luis Alonso de Santos
- Produced by: Cristóbal García; Lina Badenes; Roberto Butragueño
- Starring: Mario Casas; Alberto San Juan; Asier Etxeandia; Óscar Lasarte; Nora Hernández; Eva Ugarte; Elvira Mínguez; Martín Páez; Carmen Balagué; Toni Agustí; Carlos Serrano; Eleazar Ortiz; Ferran Gadea; Antonio Resines
- Cinematography: Aitor Mantxola
- Edited by: Vanessa Marimbert
- Music by: Anne-Sophie Versnaeyen
- Production companies: La Terraza Films; Turanga Films; Sideral Cinema; Entre Medina y Genaro AIE; Halley Production
- Distributed by: A Contracorriente Films
- Release dates: 24 September 2025 (Zinemaldia); 17 October 2025 (Spain)
- Countries: Spain; France
- Language: Spanish
- Box office: €3.7 million

The Dinner (Spanish: La cena) is a 2025 comedy film directed by Manuel Gómez Pereira from a screenplay co-written with Joaquín Oristrell and Yolanda García Serrano based on a play by José Luis Alonso de Santos. The plot follows a young lieutenant (Mario Casas), and a conscientious maître d'hôtel (Alberto San Juan) as they try to organize a banquet at Madrid's Hotel Palace for a clique of Francoist generals just weeks after the end of the Spanish Civil War.

The film was presented in a RTVE-hosted gala of the 73rd San Sebastián International Film Festival on 24 September 2025 ahead of its 17 October 2025 theatrical release in Spain by A Contracorriente Films. It won Best Adapted Screenplay and Best Costume Design at the 40th Goya Awards.

== Plot ==
Weeks after the end of the Spanish Civil War, lieutenant Santiago Medina arrives in the Hotel Palace of Madrid, then operating as a hospital for wounded, asking the maître Genaro Palazón to prepare a banquet at the hotel for Francisco Franco and his generals.

The complicated arrangements for organizing the dinner unfold afterwards. Genaro asks him for the liberation of a list of leftist cooks about to be executed as there were reportedly no adequate right-leaning cooks in Madrid at the time, while pregnant nurse María mischievously includes her partner (and future father of her child) Ángel in the list, and so Genaro bills Ángel as the somelier. One of the cooks in the list, Antón, refuses to cook for Franco, and Falange official Alonso kills him on the spot. Genaro convinces Medina to liberate female cook Juana, a strong-willed CNT union leader and Ángel's mother, to cover the vacant place. While working together, Genaro repeatedly tries to befriend lieutenant Medina, with little success, although he invites the officer to a cup of wine from the cellar. Psychopathic Alonso is troubled with rat infestation in the hotel, and is caught shooting at what he identifies as rodents. He also requires the dinner to feature music, and Genaro arranges for María (also a singer) and an all-female orchestra to play a repertory. After Alonso is presented the band members, derided by Alonso as whores, he tries to sexually abuse María, who manages to rebuff him by telling that she suffers from syphilis. The cooks devise a plan to escape and to convince right-wing monarchist Genaro to go along. The waiter service, prominently including fascist El Rubio—who also unsuccessfully vies for María's attentions—and his alcoholic aunt Flora also appear, raising tension with the cooks, who believe they were betrayed by them. Alonso also requires for flowers, and Galician officer Chapero, subordinate to Medina, finds some bouquets in the church. Genaro foils an attempt by one of the cooks (Epifanio) to kill the dinner attendees with rat poison.

Luchi, Medina's social climbing wife, appears in the hotel unexpectedly and invites herself to the dinner despite Medina's opposition. Alonso ends up bedding Luchi, to Medina's dismay. After joining the escape plan, haunted by Flora's comment stating that there was no place in the New Spain for homosexual men like him, Genaro arranges for the escape to take place with the delivery of the cake and the playing of the song "Soldadito español". María tells Ángel to meet her family at "Chez Tonton" in Hendaye and wait for her. El Rubio fights Ángel over María in the dressing room, and breaks his neck after falling and hitting with the edge of a sink. Genaro and Ángel hide the body in a closet. Genaro tries to contain his sexual excitement as he visits Medina, who is asleep in Genaro's room's bathtub after smoking a joint.

At the dinner, Franco, sit next to his wife Carmen Polo, seems to enjoy the dishes (even if the soup contained Epifanio's urine) and despite his reluctance to alcoholic drinks, somelier Ángel and Genaro get him drunk on alcohol with serial toasts. After being rescued by Flora, El Rubio, maddened and covered in blood, breaks into the dinner with a hammer trying to attack Ángel, but he is shot dead by Alonso, believing El Rubio to be attempting to kill Franco. After the cooks put the moorish guards in the kitchen to sleep with chloroform, and knock Chapero out, Genaro and the cooks escape through the church, where the group split, as some members head for Cieza, another one for visiting a relative in Auschwitz, and Juana and Ángel for Hendaye. Genaro is stopped on the street by Medina, who points a gun at him. Alonso also breaks into scene and tries to kill them while inveighing homophobic slurs against them but Genaro kills him instead, and manages to convince Medina to go with him.

Months later, María, Ángel, Juana, Genaro, and Medina celebrate in Hendaye. After people comes knocking at the door, Medina explains that they are required to prepare another dinner for Franco and another man.

== Cast ==
- Mario Casas as teniente Medina
- Alberto San Juan as Genaro
- Nora Hernández as María
- Óscar Lasarte as Ángel
- Asier Etxeandia as Alonso
- Martín Páez as Chapero
- Elvira Mínguez as Juana
- Carlos Serrano as El Rubio
- Carmen Balagué as Flora
- Antonio Resines as Antón
- Eva Ugarte as Luchi

== Production ==
Written by Joaquín Oristrell, Yolanda García Serrano, and Manuel Gómez Pereira, the screenplay is based on the play La cena de los generales by José Luis Alonso de Santos. The film is a Spanish-French co-production by La Terraza Films, Turanga Films, Sideral Cinema, Entre Medina y Genaro AIE, and Halley Production, with the participation of RTVE, Movistar Plus+, and Crea SGR. Aitor Mantxola worked as cinematographer. Shooting locations included Valencia (Palau de les Comunicacions, Ateneo Mercantil, CEV Building), and Las Palmas.

== Release ==
The film was presented at a RTVE gala during the 73rd San Sebastián International Film Festival on 24 September 2025. Distributed by A Contracorriente Films, it was released theatrically in Spain on 17 October 2025. Opening in 294 screens, it grossed €465,670 (65,337 admissions) in its first weekend. It also received a screening at the Teatre Principal as the opening film of the 40th Mostra de València. The film's box office performance posted a 'good' -5% drop in its second weekend for a total gross of about €1.3 million. By the end of 2025, it had grossed of around €3.7 million.

== Reception ==
Miguel Ángel Sánchez of HobbyConsolas gave the film 80 points ('very good') declaring it "one of the best Spanish comedies of recent times, which uses humour to illustrate a terrible era", mentioning the "superlative" performances by Casas and San Juan among the best things about it while noting its inability to trascend clichés and commonplaces as a negative point.

Philipp Engel of Cinemanía rated the film 3½ out of 5 stars, tentatively declaring it a sort of potential prequel to Love Can Seriously Damage Your Health, deeming The Dinner to be a "well-crafted vaudeville" like the former.

Pablo Vázquez of Fotogramas rated the film 4 out of 5 stars, singling out "the play between Casas and a gigantic San Juan" as the best thing about it.

Javier Ocaña of El País deemed the film to be a "great comedy" elegantly linking up "the necessity of memory, the value of dignity, the nobility of ideals of freedom, the heartbreak of tragedy, and the bright laughter of ridicule".

== Accolades ==
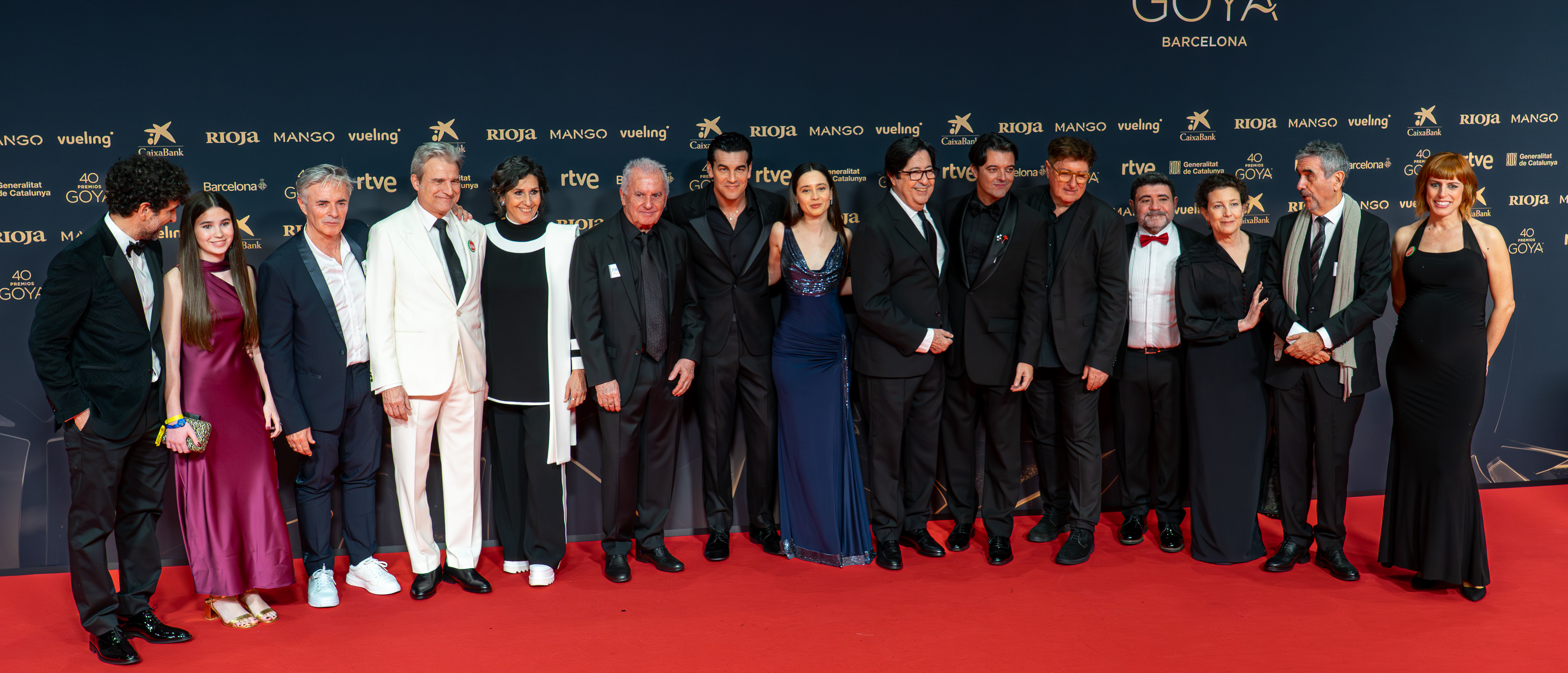
Cast and crew members attending the 2026 Goya Awards.

Year	Award	Category	Nominee(s)	Result	Ref.
2025	8th Lola Gaos Awards	Best Supporting Actress	Gloria March Chulvi	Won	
2025	8th Lola Gaos Awards	Best Art Direction	Maje Tarazona	Won	
2025	31st Forqué Awards	Best Actor in a Film	Alberto San Juan	Nominated	
2026	13th Feroz Awards	Best Comedy Film		Won	
2026	13th Feroz Awards	Best Main Actor in a Film	Alberto San Juan	Nominated	
2026	13th Feroz Awards	Best Supporting Actress in a Film	Elvira Mínguez	Nominated	
2026	13th Feroz Awards	Best Supporting Actor in a Film	Asier Etxeandia	Nominated	
2026	13th Feroz Awards	Best Trailer	Alberto de Toro	Nominated	
2026	81st CEC Medals	Best Adapted Screenplay	Joaquín Oristrell, Manuel Gómez Pereira, Yolanda García Serrano	Nominated	
2026	81st CEC Medals	Best Actor	Alberto San Juan	Nominated	
2026	81st CEC Medals	Best Supporting Actress	Elvira Mínguez	Nominated	
2026	40th Goya Awards	Best Film		Nominated	
2026	40th Goya Awards	Best Adapted Screenplay	Joaquín Oristrell, Manuel Gómez Pereira, Yolanda García Serrano	Won	
2026	40th Goya Awards	Best Actor	Alberto San Juan	Nominated	
2026	40th Goya Awards	Best Supporting Actress	Elvira Mínguez	Nominated	
2026	40th Goya Awards	Best New Actress	Nora Hernández	Nominated	
2026	40th Goya Awards	Best Art Direction	Koldo Vallés	Nominated	
2026	40th Goya Awards	Best Costume Design	Helena Sanchis	Won	
2026	40th Goya Awards	Best Original Song	"Y mientras tanto, canto" by Víctor Manuel	Nominated	
2026	34th Actors and Actresses Union Awards	Best Film Actor in a Leading Role	Alberto San Juan	Nominated	
2026	34th Actors and Actresses Union Awards	Best Film Actor in a Minor Role	Carlos Serrano	Nominated	
2026	34th Actors and Actresses Union Awards	Best Film Actress in a Minor Role	Elvira Mínguez	Won	
2026	34th Actors and Actresses Union Awards	Best New Actress	Nora Hernández	Nominated	
2026	9th ALMA Awards	Best Screenplay in a Comedy Film	Yolanda García Serrano, Manuel Gómez Pereira, Joaquín Oristrell	Won	
2026	13th Platino Awards	Best Ibero-American Comedy Film		Won	
2026	13th Platino Awards	Best Actor	Alberto San Juan	Nominated	
2026	13th Platino Awards	Best Art Direction	Koldo Vallés	Nominated	
2026	13th Platino Awards	Best Costume Design	Helena Sanchis	Won	

== See also ==
- List of Spanish films of 2025
