= Sundays (film) =

- Theatrical release poster
- Spanish: Los domingos
- Directed by: Alauda Ruiz de Azúa
- Screenplay by: Alauda Ruiz de Azúa
- Produced by: Marisa Fernández Armenteros; Sandra Hermida; Nahikari Ipiña; Manu Calvo
- Starring: Blanca Soroa; Patricia López Arnaiz; Miguel Garcés; Juan Minujín; Mabel Rivera; Nagore Aranburu
- Cinematography: Bet Rourich
- Edited by: Andrés Gil
- Production companies: Buenapinta Media; Colosé Producciones; Sayaka Producciones; Encanta Films; Think Studio; Los desencuentros película AIE; Movistar Plus+
- Distributed by: BTeam Pictures
- Release dates: 22 September 2025 (Zinemaldia); 24 October 2025 (Spain)
- Running time: 116 minutes
- Country: Spain
- Language: Spanish
- Box office: €5.0 million (Spain)

Sundays (Note: Alternatively translated as The Sundays.) (Spanish: Los domingos) is a 2025 drama film written and directed by Alauda Ruiz de Azúa. It stars newcomer Blanca Soroa along with Patricia López Arnaiz, Miguel Garcés, Juan Minujín, Mabel Rivera, and Nagore Aranburu. Set in the Basque Country, the plot follows a teenage woman (Soroa) pondering about the possibility of joining a cloistered convent, deepening family rifts featuring her aloof father (Garcés) and her more involving aunt (López Arnaiz).

The film had its world premiere at the 73rd San Sebastián International Film Festival on 22 September 2025 and went on to win the Golden Shell. BTeam Pictures released theatrically the film in Spain on 24 October 2025. It won Best Film at the 40th Goya Awards along with Best Director, Best Original Screenplay, Best Actress (López Arnaiz), and Best Supporting Actress (Aranburu).

== Plot ==
During a religious retreat with her friends, 17-year-old Ainara makes acquaintance with a mother prioress. Ainara's aunt, Maite (an atheist cultural manager), takes Ainara home. Ainara asks her father Iñaki (a widower and restaurant owner more interested in his business and his new girlfriend Estibaliz than his eldest daughter) about the possibility of spending more time with the nuns, while her friends are in an exchange program. While in Maite's apartment with Maite's partner Pablo (an applicant for a position as a teacher in the Basque education system) and their son, Maite pumps Ainara for information about Ainara's intention to start a "vocational discernment" process and potentially become a cloistered nun. Her aunt reacts with astonishment and advises her niece to experience more of life before making such a decision.

After meetings with Ainara's "spiritual guide" Father Chema in the context of the State-subsidised religious education Ainara and her father and aunt before her have been raised, Ainara maintains her intention to continue with the spiritual process, claiming that she speaks to God and God sometimes answers her back. Ainara's grandmother María Dolores tells Ainara of the sadness that her absence would cause. Maite and Pablo's marriage is in crisis. Maite tries to persuade Ainara's friend Izaskun to try to broaden Ainara's horizons and activities. She finds out that Ainara fooled around with Mikel, a fellow choir member. While sharing the same bed in a country house with her friends, Ainara feels attracted to Mikel. Eventually, while back from choir practice in Ainara's bedroom, Mikel kisses Ainara and they start petting. They are discovered by Estíbaliz and Ainara's two younger sisters. This and Ainara's reaction in denial suggesting that Estíbaliz somewhat lied about the scene provoke Iñaki's anger and a family row at the dinner table. Maite and Iñaki visit the Mother Prioress and beg her to advise Ainara to be patient, and to allow her to study for a university degree. The Mother Prioress refuses to do so, leaving such matters in God's hands, while Maite explains to the Prioress that Ainara developed emotional issues after her mother died. Concerned about the costs, Iñaki refuses to send Ainara abroad even though he took a €310,000 loan for his restaurant. While on probation at the convent, Ainara bonds closer with a young nun.

Ainara's probation is interrupted by María Dolores' death. After the funeral, Maite explodes with rage at Iñaki, reproaching him for leaving her without an inheritance from the half of María Dolores' home (which was used as collateral for Iñaki's loans) and for not asking Ainara to stay, likewise suggesting that Iñaki let his daughter go because it is cheaper to look after two than three daughters. She also derides the nuns and dramatically pleads Ainara not to be fooled by them. Ainara replies that she will pray for her. Maite takes legal action to disinherit her brother and her eldest niece. Ainara takes the vows, becomes a cloistered nun, and Maite faces challenges ahead.

== Cast ==
- Blanca Soroa as Ainara
- Patricia López Arnaiz as Maite
- Miguel Garcés as Iñaki
- Juan Minujín as Pablo
- Mabel Rivera as María Dolores
- Nagore Aranburu as madre priora Isabel
- Noe Chiroque as sor Aurora
- Lier Alava as Gorka

== Production ==
The project, then reported to be in development, was announced in May 2024. The film is a Sayaka Producciones, Buenapinta Media, Encanta Films, Los Desencuentros Película AIE, Think Studio, Colosé Producciones, and Movistar Plus+ production, with the association of Le Pacte. In early 2025, prior to the start of filming, Ruiz de Azúa told that her previous works Lullaby and Querer were, in a way, "bricks in the house" of Sundays. Principal photography began on 20 February 2025. Shooting locations in Bilbao included the Calle Rodríguez Arias. Bet Rourich worked as cinematographer.

== Release ==
Sundays was presented in the main competition of the 73rd San Sebastián International Film Festival on 22 September 2025. It was also selected for a 21 October 2025 screening as the opening film of the 14th Evolution Mallorca International Film Festival, and in the programmings of the 47th Montpellier International Mediterranean Film Festival (Cinemed), and the 38th Angers European First Film Festival. For its North American premiere, it made it to the 'World Cinema Now' selection of the 37th Palm Springs International Film Festival. Its festival run continued with selections for screenings at the 55th International Film Festival Rotterdam, the 22nd Glasgow Film Festival, the 27th Buenos Aires International Festival of Independent Cinema (BAFICI), the 2026 Seattle International Film Festival, and the 73rd Sydney Film Festival.

BTeam Pictures released the film in Spanish theatres on 24 October 2025. The film landed a €0.443 million gross in its opening weekend, good for the 4th position in the Spanish box office. By late November 2025, it had grossed around €3.2 million (523,000 admissions). After more than 20 weeks of theatrical window, it had grossed near €5 million (over 700,000 admissions). It is scheduled to receive a theatrical release in France on 11 February 2026 by Le Pacte.

Le Pacte also handled international sales, closing distribution deals in the European territories of Germany and Austria (MFA+ FilmDistribution), Italy (Movies Inspired), Nordic countries (Angel Films), the Benelux (Cherry Pickers), Greece (Weird Wave), Poland (Rafael Films), Switzerland (Agora Films), Romania (Independenta), Portugal (Leopardo Filmes) and Croatia (Kino Mediteran) as well as deals in Latin America, including the markets of Mexico (Cine Video y TV) and Colombia (Babilla Ciné), and Australia and New Zealand (Palace Films). Zima Entertainment set a 1 April 2026 theatrical release in Mexico. Outsider Pictures acquired U.S. distribution rights.

== Reception ==
=== Critical response ===
On the review aggregator website Rotten Tomatoes, 100% of 11 critics' reviews are positive, with an average rating of 8.2/10.

Alfonso Rivera of Cineuropa declared the film to be "nothing short of miraculous" wondering "how can such an apparently unattractive premise" "result in a film that seizes the viewer from the opening frames and refuses to let go until the final credits".

Jonathan Romney of ScreenDaily assessed that Ruiz de Azúa "elegantly" fuses the coming-of-age movie with the crisis-of-faith drama, with Soroa rising to the occasion on the acting side with a "moving, perfectly modulated intensity".

Elsa Fernández-Santos of El País considered the film "a sober and ambiguous family drama" that [refractary to picking a side] "flutters [instead] like a moth around the light of a complex debate whose certainties and contradictions remain up in the air".

Éric Neuhoff of Le Figaro assessed that with an "original premise" and an "actress irradiating mystery" (Soroa), Ruiz de Azúa confirms her extraordinary talents, lauding her film as a "miracle".

Alejandro Lingenti of La Nación gave the film 5 stars ('excellent'), considering that, first and foremost, it offers "a thorough and revealing analysis of the pitfalls in family dynamics".

=== Accolades ===
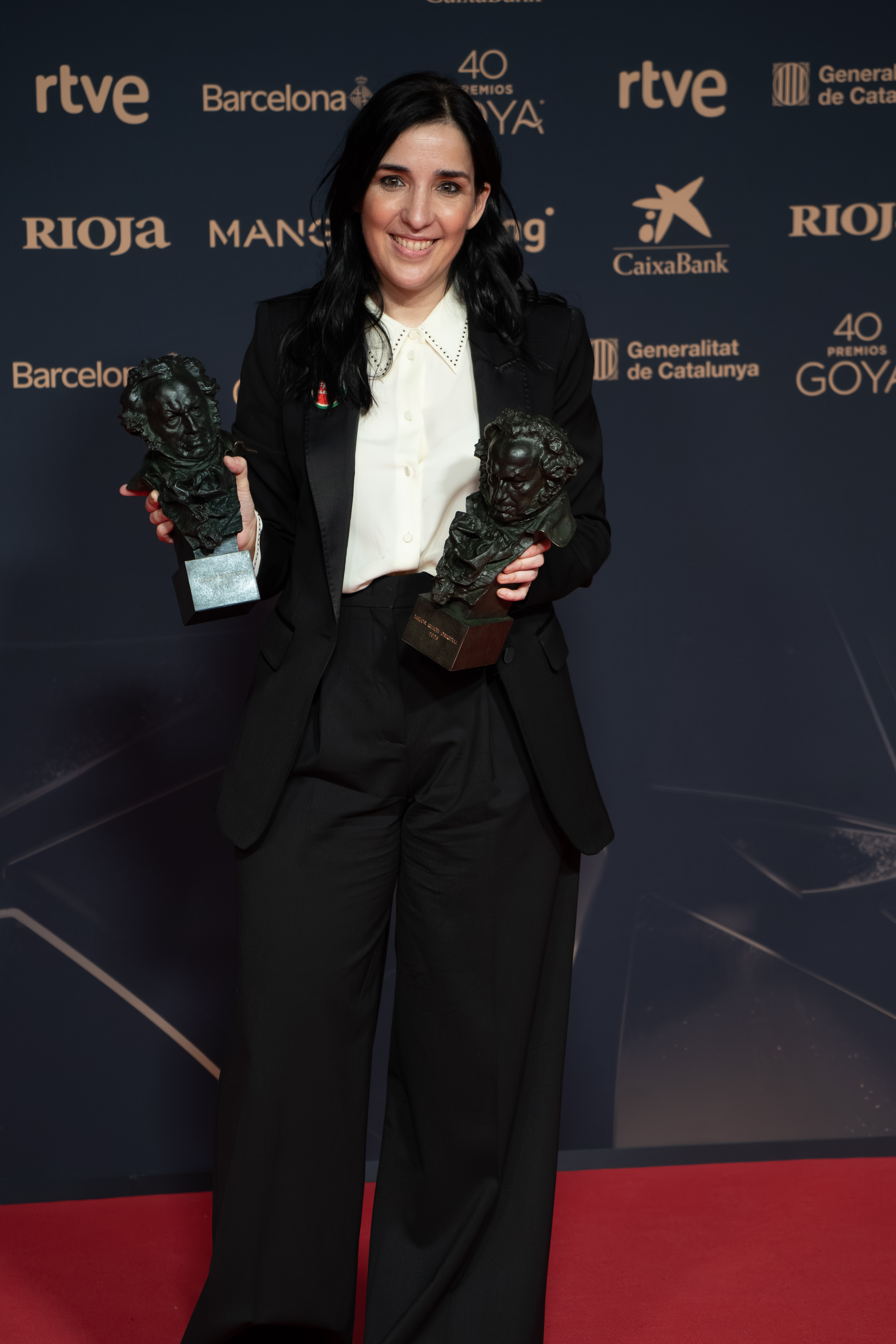
Ruiz de Azúa holding her Goya awards for Best Director and Best Original Screenplay

Year	Award	Category	Nominee(s)	Result	Ref.
2025	73rd San Sebastián International Film Festival	Golden Shell		Won	
2025	73rd San Sebastián International Film Festival	Irizar Basque Film Award		Won	
2025	73rd San Sebastián International Film Festival	Feroz Zinemaldia Award		Won	
2025	73rd San Sebastián International Film Festival	FIPRESCI Award		Won	
2025	73rd San Sebastián International Film Festival	SIGNIS Award		Won	
2025	47th Montpellier International Mediterranean Film Festival	Golden Antigone		Won	
2025	31st Forqué Awards	Best Film		Won	
2025	31st Forqué Awards	Best Actress in a Film	Patricia López Arnaiz	Won	
2025	31st Forqué Awards	Cinema and Education in Values		Nominated	
2026	13th Feroz Awards	Best Drama Film		Won	
2026	13th Feroz Awards	Best Director	Alauda Ruiz de Azúa	Won	
2026	13th Feroz Awards	Best Screenplay	Alauda Ruiz de Azúa	Won	
2026	13th Feroz Awards	Best Main Actress in a Film	Patricia López Arnaiz	Won	
2026	13th Feroz Awards	Best Main Actress in a Film	Blanca Soroa	Nominated	
2026	13th Feroz Awards	Best Supporting Actress in a Film	Nagore Aranburu	Won	
2026	13th Feroz Awards	Best Supporting Actor in a Film	Miguel Garcés	Nominated	
2026	13th Feroz Awards	Best Trailer	Aitor Tapia, Manel Barriere	Nominated	
2026	13th Feroz Awards	Best Film Poster	Jimena Merino, Álvaro León, Luis León, David Herranz	Nominated	
2026	5th Carmen Awards	Best Non-Andalusian Produced Film		Won	
2026	81st CEC Medals	Best Film		Won	
2026	81st CEC Medals	Best Director	Alaúda Ruiz de Azúa	Won	
2026	81st CEC Medals	Best Original Screenplay	Alaúda Ruiz de Azúa	Won	
2026	81st CEC Medals	Best Actress	Patricia López Arnaiz	Won	
2026	81st CEC Medals	Best Actor	Miguel Garcés	Nominated	
2026	81st CEC Medals	Best Supporting Actress	Nagore Aranburu	Won	
2026	81st CEC Medals	Best Supporting Actor	Juan Minujín	Nominated	
2026	81st CEC Medals	Best New Actress	Blanca Soroa	Won	
2026	81st CEC Medals	Best Cinematography	Bet Rourich	Nominated	
2026	81st CEC Medals	Best Editing	Andrés Gil	Nominated	
2026	40th Goya Awards	Best Film		Won	
2026	40th Goya Awards	Best Director	Alauda Ruiz de Azúa	Won	
2026	40th Goya Awards	Best Original Screenplay	Alauda Ruiz de Azúa	Won	
2026	40th Goya Awards	Best Actress	Patricia López Arnaiz	Won	
2026	40th Goya Awards	Best Actor	Miguel Garcés	Nominated	
2026	40th Goya Awards	Best Supporting Actress	Nagore Aranburu	Won	
2026	40th Goya Awards	Best Supporting Actor	Juan Minujín	Nominated	
2026	40th Goya Awards	Best New Actress	Blanca Soroa	Nominated	
2026	40th Goya Awards	Best Cinematography	Bet Rourich	Nominated	
2026	40th Goya Awards	Best Production Supervision	Itziar García Zubiri	Nominated	
2026	40th Goya Awards	Best Editing	Andrés Gil	Nominated	
2026	40th Goya Awards	Best Costume Design	Ana Martínez Fesser	Nominated	
2026	40th Goya Awards	Best Sound	Andrea Sáenz Pereiro, Mayte Cabrera	Nominated	
2026	34th Actors and Actresses Union Awards	Best Film Actress in a Leading Role	Patricia López Arnaiz	Won	
2026	34th Actors and Actresses Union Awards	Best Film Actor in a Secondary Role	Miguel Garcés	Nominated	
2026	34th Actors and Actresses Union Awards	Best Film Actress in a Secondary Role	Nagore Aranburu	Won	
2026	34th Actors and Actresses Union Awards	Best Film Actor in a Minor Role	Víctor Sáinz	Won	
2026	34th Actors and Actresses Union Awards	Best Film Actress in a Minor Role	Mabel Rivera	Nominated	
2026	34th Actors and Actresses Union Awards	Best New Actress	Blanca Soroa	Nominated	
2026	9th ALMA Awards	Best Screenplay in a Drama Film	Alauda Ruiz de Azúa	Won	
2026	41st Guadalajara International Film Festival	Latin American Critics' Award for European Films		Nominated	
2026	13th Platino Awards	Best Ibero-American Film		Nominated	
2026	13th Platino Awards	Best Director	Alauda Ruiz de Azúa	Nominated	
2026	13th Platino Awards	Best Screenplay	Alauda Ruiz de Azúa	Nominated	
2026	13th Platino Awards	Best Actress	Blanca Soroa	Won	
2026	13th Platino Awards	Best Actress	Patricia López Arnaiz	Nominated	
2026	13th Platino Awards	Best Supporting Actress	Nagore Aramburu	Nominated	
2026	13th Platino Awards	Best Supporting Actor	Juan Minujín	Nominated	
2026	13th Platino Awards	Best Cinematography	Bet Rourich	Nominated	
2026	13th Platino Awards	Best Film Editing	Andrés Gil	Nominated	
2026	13th Platino Awards	Best Costume Design	Ana Martínez Fesser	Nominated	
2026	13th Platino Awards	Best Makeup and Hairstyles	Ainhoa Eskisabel, Jone Gabarain	Nominated	
2026	20th Sur Awards	Best Ibero-American Film		Nominated	
2026	68th Ariel Awards	Best Ibero-American Film		Nominated	
2026	14th Macondo Awards	Best Ibero-American Film – FIACINE		Nominated	

== See also ==
- List of Spanish films of 2025
