= 2025 in Spanish television =

This is a list of Spanish television related events from 2025.

== Events ==
- 7 January – Disney Channel stops broadcasting and Squirrel is launched in its place.
- 9 July – Max reverts to its previous branding as HBO Max.

== Television shows ==
=== Shows expected to debut in 2025 ===
Title	Channel / platform	Debut date	Performers / host	Genre	Ref.
En la nave del encanto	Netflix	7 January	Pedro Alonso	Documentary	
Next Level Chef	Telecinco	8 January	Blanca Romero	Cooking competition	
Naked and Afraid Spain	Max	12 January		Reality show	
El capitán en América	Antena 3	15 January	Joaquín	Reality show	
Custodia repartida	Disney+	24 January	Lorena López, Ricard Farré	Comedy-drama	
Love You to Death	Apple TV+	5 February	Verónica Echegui, Joan Amargós	Romantic comedy	
How I Left the Opus Dei	Max	7 February		Documentary	
Asuntos internos	La 1	12 February	Laia Manzanares, Silvia Abascal, Marta Poveda	Thriller	
La vida breve	Movistar Plus+	13 February	Carlos Scholz, Alicia Armenteros, Javier Gutiérrez, Leonor Watling	Historical comedy	
José Mota: No News	La 1	14 February	José Mota	Sketch comedy	
Física o química: La nueva generación	Atresplayer	16 February	Rocío Velayos, María Bernardeau	Teen drama	
Receta para un asesinato	SkyShowtime	23 February		Documentary	
Su majestad	Amazon Prime Video	27 February	Anna Castillo, Ernesto Alterio	Comedy	
Aitana: Metamorphosis	Netflix	28 February		Documentary	
¡Salta!	Antena 3	1 March	Manel Fuentes	Game show	
When No One Sees Us	Max	7 March	Mariela Garriga, Maribel Verdú, Dani Rovira	Thriller	
La Favorita 1922	Telecinco	17 March	Verónica Sánchez, Luis Fernández	Period drama	
Perdiendo el juicio	Atresplayer	23 March	Elena Rivera	Legal drama	
Tentáculos	Ten	26 March	Carlota Corredera	Magazine	
The Lady's Companion	Netflix	28 March	Nadia de Santiago, Álvaro Mel, Isa Montalbán	Period drama	
Punto Nemo	Amazon Prime Video	28 March	Óscar Jaenada, Alba Flores	Science-fiction	
Malas lenguas	La 2	9 April	Jesús Cintora	News	
The Gardener	Netflix	11 April	Álvaro Rico, Cecilia Suárez, Catalina Sopelana	Romantic thriller	
Carlos Alcaraz: My Way	Netflix	23 April		Sports documentary	
Mariliendre	Atresplayer	27 April	Blanca Martínez Rodrigo	Musical comedy	
La familia de la tele	La 1	5 May	María Patiño, Aitor Albizua, Inés Hernand	Magazine	
La canción	Movistar Plus+	8 May	Carolina Yuste, Patrick Criado, Àlex Brendemühl	Biographical	
Futuro imperfecto	La 1	8 May	Andreu Buenafuente	Comedy-talk show	
Weiss & Morales	La 1	23 May	Miguel Ángel Silvestre, Katia Fellin	Thriller	
Ladrones: La tiara de santa Águeda	Disney+	13 June	Álex González, Silvia Alonso	Thriller	
La frontera	Amazon Prime Video	13 June	Javier Rey, Itsaso Arana	Thriller	
Olympo	Netflix	20 June	Clara Galle	Sports drama	
Los sin nombre	Movistar Plus+	26 June	Miren Ibarguren, Rodrigo de la Serna, Milena Smit	Supernatural thriller	
La encrucijada	Atresplayer	2 July	Ástrid Janer, Rodrigo Guirao	Melodrama	
El clan Olimpia	Disney+	11 July	Zaira Romero		
Rage	HBO Max	11 July	Carmen Machi, Candela Peña, Cecilia Roth	Comedy	
Agárrate al sillón	Telecinco	13 July	Eugeni Alemany	Game show	
La pirámide	La 1	18 July	Itziar Miranda	Game show	
Superstar	Netflix	18 July	Ingrid García-Jonsson, Secun de la Rosa	Biographical	
Two Graves	Netflix	29 August	Kiti Mánver, Álvaro Morte, Hovik Keuchkerian	Thriller	
No somos nadie	Ten	1 September	María Patiño	Magazine	
La caza. Irati	Movistar Plus+	4 September	Megan Montaner, Félix Gómez, Silvia Alonso	Mystery thriller	
La agencia	Telecinco	10 September	Javier Gutiérrez, Manuela Velasco, Carlos Bardem, Fiorella Faltoyano	Workplace comedy	
Mar afuera	Atresplayer	14 September	Gabriel Guevara, Hugo Welzel		
Billionaires' Bunker	Netflix	19 September	Pau Simón, Alícia Falcó		
Pubertat - Secrets, Lies, and Human Castles	HBO Max	24 September	Leticia Dolera	Family drama	
Old Dog, New Tricks	Netflix	3 October	Luis Zahera, Lucía Caraballo	Comedy	
Fate	Disney+	8 October	Ricardo Gómez, Óscar Jaenada	Comedy	
El centro	Movistar Plus+	9 October	Juan Diego Botto, Elena Martín, Tristán Ulloa	Spy thriller	
Entrepreneurs	Disney+	23 October	Rober Bodegas, Alberto Casado	Workplace comedy	
Tell Me Your Name	Amazon Prime Video	31 October	Michelle Jenner, Darío Grandinetti, Younes Bouab	Horror	
Jakarta	Movistar Plus+	6 November	Javier Cámara, Carla Quílez	Comedy-drama	
The Anatomy of a Moment	Movistar Plus+	20 November	Álvaro Morte, Eduard Fernández, Manolo Solo	Historical drama	
Ena. Queen Victoria Eugenia	La 1	24 November	Kimberley Tell	Biographical	
Silence	Movistar Plus+	1 December	Lucía Díez, María León, Ana Polvorosa	Comedy-drama	
Terra Alta	Movistar Plus+	4 December	Miguel Bernardeau	Police thriller	
Innate	Netflix	23 December	Elena Anaya, Imanol Arias	Psychological thriller	

=== Shows ending in 2025 ===
- La 1
  - El cazador (2020–2025)
  - La Moderna (2023–2025)
- La 2
  - 59 segundos (2004–2025)
  - Comando actualidad (2008–2025)
  - El condensador de fluzo (2020-2025)
- Cuatro
  - Martínez y Hermanos (2022–2025)
- Telecinco
  - Caiga quien caiga (1996–2025)
  - Reacción en cadena (2022–2025)
  - Gran Hermano Dúo (2019-2025)
  - Reacción en cadena (2022-2025)
  - Socialité (2017-2025)
  - Tardear (2023-2025)
- Ten
  - Ni que fuéramos (2024–2025)
- Netflix
  - Valeria (2020–2025)

=== Shows expected to return in 2025 ===
Show	Previous network	Last aired	New network	Type of return	Returning
Gran Hermano Dúo	Telecinco	2024	Telecinco	New season	2 January
Atrapa un millón	Antena 3	2024	Antena 3	New season	4 January
Hay una cosa que te quiero decir	Telecinco	2015	Telecinco	Revival	4 January
La isla de las tentaciones	Telecinco	2024	Telecinco	New season	6 January
Alpha Males	Netflix	2024	Netflix	New season	10 January
El desafío	Antena 3	2024	Antena 3	New season	10 January
Bake Off: Famosos al horno	La 1	2024	La 1	New season	12 January
Muertos S.L.	Movistar Plus+	2024	Movistar Plus+	New season	16 January
Al cielo con ella	RTVE Play	2024	RTVE Play	New season	19 January
Caiga quien caiga	Cuatro	2010	Telecinco	Revival	19 January
Lo de Évole	LaSexta	2024	LaSexta	New season	19 January
El programa de Ana Rosa	Telecinco	2023	Telecinco	Revival	3 February
Valeria	Netflix	2023	Netflix	New season	14 February
Tu cara me suena	Antena 3	2024	Antena 3	New season	4 April
The Floor	Antena 3	2023	La 1	New season	23 April
Memento Mori	Amazon Prime Video	2023	Amazon Prime Video	New season	25 April
That's My Jam: Que el ritmo no pare	Movistar Plus+	2023	La 1	Revival	6 May
Traitors España	Max	2023	Antena 3	New season	7 May
Jeopardy	Antena 3	2007	La 2	Revival	12 May
Operación triunfo	Amazon Prime Video	2024	Amazon Prime Video	New season	15 September

=== Changes of network affiliation ===
Show	Moved From	Moved To
59 segundos (2004–2025)	La 1	La 2
Caiga quien caiga (1996–2025)	Cuatro	Telecinco
The Floor (2023–)	Antena 3	La 1
Jeopardy (2007–2025)	Antena 3	La 2
Late Xou con Marc Giró (2023–)	La 2	La 1
Muertos S.L. (2024–)	Movistar Plus+	Netflix
That's My Jam: Que el ritmo no pare (2023–)	Movistar Plus+	La 1
Traitors España (2023–)	Max	Antena 3

== Deaths ==
- 16 January – Francisco San Martín, actor, 39.
- 22 January – Xosé Manuel Piñeiro, presenter, 68.
- 19 February – Tony Isbert, actor, 74.
