= The Treasure of Barracuda =

- Theatrical release poster
- Spanish: El tesoro de Barracuda
- Directed by: Adrián García
- Written by: Amèlia Mora
- Based on: El tesoro de Barracuda by Llanos Campos
- Produced by: Valérie Delpierre; Álex Cervantes; Álvaro García; Raphaële Ingberg
- Production companies: Inicia Films; Hampa Studio; El Tesoro de Barracuda AIE; Belvision
- Distributed by: Filmax
- Release dates: 20 September 2025 (Cines Bonaire); 26 September 2025 (Spain)
- Running time: 87 minutes
- Countries: Spain; Belgium
- Language: Spanish

The Treasure of Barracuda (Spanish: El tesoro de Barracuda) is a 2025 animated pirate adventure film directed by Adrià García and written by Amèlia Mora inspired on the El Barco de Vapor children's book of the same name by Llanos Campos.

== Plot ==
While searching for her parents, young Chispas ends up in a pirate ship helmed by Captain Barracuda, helping the crew to find the treasure of Phineas Crane, as they do not know how to read.

== Voice cast ==
- Ángel del Río as Capitán Barracuda
- Laia Vidal as Chispas
- Mark Ullod as Ballena
- Esther Solans as Puño de Hierro
- Germán José as Krane
- Francesc Belda as Fung Thao
- Jordi Pineda as Gato

== Production ==
The film is based on the book El tesoro de Barracuda by Llanos Campos published by SM in the El Barco de Vapor children's book collection. It is a Spanish-Belgian co-production by Inicia Films and Hampa Animation Studio with Belvision, with the participation of RTVE, À Punt, 3Cat, and RTBF.

== Release ==
The film received a pre-screening at the Cines Bonaire in Valencia on 20 September 2025. It also made it to the children's slate of the 73rd San Sebastián International Film Festival and to the 'Just Film International Children's Competition Programme' of the 29th Tallinn Black Nights Film Festival.

Distributed by Filmax, it is set to be released theatrically in Spain on 26 September 2025.

== Accolades ==
Year	Award	Category	Nominee(s)	Result	Ref.
2025	31st Forqué Awards	Best Animation Film		Nominated	
2026	18th Gaudí Awards	Best Animation Film		Nominated	
2026	81st CEC Medals	Best Animation Film		Nominated	
2026	40th Goya Awards	Best Animated Film		Nominated	

== See also ==
- List of Spanish films of 2025
