= The Light of Aisha =

- Theatrical release poster
- Catalan: La llum de l'Aisha
- Directed by: Shadi Adib
- Screenplay by: Xavier Romero; Llorenç Español Nolla
- Produced by: Albert Cheok; Joseph Christopher Koh; Holger Weiss; Laura Fernández Brites; Carlos Fernández; Raúl Berninches; Peter Keydel
- Starring: Michelle Jenner; Jordi Sánchez; Nerea Rodríguez
- Production companies: Mago Production; Filmax; Peng! Boom! Tschak! Films; Sangnila
- Distributed by: Filmax
- Release dates: March 2025 (Málaga); 11 April 2025 (Spain)
- Running time: 85 minutes
- Countries: Spain; Germany; Singapur
- Language: Catalan

The Light of Aisha (Catalan: La llum de l'Aisha) is a 2025 animated adventure film directed by Shadi Adib.

== Plot ==
In an 11th-century Andalusi taifa kingdom, (Note: In the south of current-day Spain.) Aisha, a girl dreaming on mastering the craft of fireworks, (Note: Developed in Asia, fireworks were not introduced in Europe up until the 13th century.) sees herself framed by an alchemist into stealing a dangerous book guarded by her family of calligraphers, going on an adventure to recover the item and thus free her father from un unjust imprisonment.

== Voice cast ==
- Michelle Jenner as Aisha
- Jordi Sánchez as Muthadi
- Nerea Rodríguez as Nura

== Production ==
The project won a Best Screenplay Award at the 2019 Stuttgart International Festival of Animated Film. The film is co-production by companies from Spain, Germany and Singapur produced by Mago Production, Filmax, Peng! Boom! Tschak! Films and Sangnila with the participation of 3Cat and RTVE and backing from Creative Europe MEDIA, ICAA, MFG Baden-Wüttermberg, and Eurimages. Raúl García worked as director of animation.

== Release ==
The film premiered in the 'Cine para la Infancia' parallel section of the 28th Málaga Film Festival. It was released theatrically in Spain by Filmax on 11 April 2025.

== Reception ==
Sergio F. Pinilla of Cinemanía rated the film 2½ out of 5 stars, finding it to be a "likeable" film for children, shortcomings in character design notwithstanding.

== Accolades ==
Year	Award	Category	Nominee(s)	Result	Ref.
2025	31st Forqué Awards	Best Animation Film		Nominated	
2026	18th Gaudí Awards	Best Animation Film		Nominated	
2026	81st CEC Medals	Best Animation Film		Nominated	

== See also ==
- List of Spanish films of 2025
