= Awakening Beauty =

- Theatrical release poster
- Spanish: Bella
- Directed by: Manuel H. Martín; Amparo Martínez Barco
- Screenplay by: Manuel H. Martín; Carmen Jiménez
- Starring: Michelle Jenner; Víctor Clavijo
- Edited by: Manuel H. Martín
- Music by: Beatriz López Nogales
- Production companies: La Claqueta PC; Bella Animación La Película AIE; Tal y Cual; Filmgate Miami
- Distributed by: Syldavia Cinema
- Release dates: 27 October 2025 (Seminci); 28 November 2025 (Spain)
- Running time: 61 minutes
- Countries: Spain; United States
- Language: Spanish

Awakening Beauty (Spanish: Bella) is a 2025 animated drama film directed by Manuel H. Martín and Amparo Martínez Barco. It tackles violence against women and its red flags.

== Plot ==
The plot follows Bella a young woman with a brilliant future who falls for artist Ponce. Moving forward six years, they are married, had children and are living in a luxury residence but, as her "Prince Charming" turns out to be a monster, she is also enduring protracted psychological violence and abuse.

== Cast ==
- Michelle Jenner as Bella
- Víctor Clavijo as Ponce

== Production ==
Written by Manuel H. Martín and Carmen Jiménez, the screenplay is freely inspired by the real life experiences of Ana Bella Estévez, a Sevillian activist against gender violence. The film is a Spanish-American co-production by La Claqueta PC alongside Bella Animación La Película AIE, Tal y Cual, and Miami Film Gate.

== Release ==
Awakening Beauty had its world premiere at the 70th Valladolid International Film Festival on 27 October 2025. Distributed by Syldavia Cinema, it was released theatrically in Spain on 28 November 2025.

== Reception ==
Salvador Llopart of La Vanguardia rated Awakening Beauty 2 out of 5 stars, deeming it to be, rather than a film, "a pamphlet that is not ashamed to be one".

David Arroyo of MeriStation rated the film 3 out of 5 stars, declaring it a sort of "instruction manual with examples of abuse, consequences, and solutions", albeit a quite comprehensive and well developed one.

== Accolades ==
Year	Award	Category	Nominee(s)	Result	Ref.
2025	31st Forqué Awards	Best Animation Film		Nominated	
2026	5th Carmen Awards	Best Animation Film		Won	
2026	81st CEC Medals	Best Animation Film		Nominated	
2026	40th Goya Awards	Best Animated Film		Nominated	

== See also ==
- List of Spanish films of 2025
