= Superstar (2025 TV series) =

Spanish TV series

- Promotional release poster
- Spanish: Superestar
- Created by: Nacho Vigalondo
- Written by: Nacho Vigalondo; María Bastarós; Paco Bezerra; Claudia Costafreda
- Directed by: Nacho Vigalondo; Claudia Costafreda
- Starring: Ingrid García-Jonsson; Secun de la Rosa; Natalia de Molina; Pepón Nieto; Carlos Areces; Rocío Ibáñez; Julián Villagrán
- Country of origin: Spain
- Original language: Spanish
- No. of episodes: 6

Production
- Producers: Javier Calvo; Javier Ambrossi
- Production company: Suma Content

Original release
- Network: Netflix
- Release: 18 July 2025

Superstar (Spanish: Superestar) is a Spanish biographical miniseries directed by Nacho Vigalondo and Claudia Costafreda starring Ingrid García-Jonsson as Tamara alongside Secun de la Rosa, Rocío Ibáñez, Natalia de Molina, Pepón Nieto, Carlos Areces, and Julián Villagrán. It was released on Netflix on 18 July 2025.

The fiction tackles its subject matter with a surrealist tone.

== Plot ==
Set against the backdrop of the turn of the 21st century in Spain, the plot tracks the unlikely breakout of pop singer and social icon Tamara alongside a troupe of other oddball television personalities.

== Cast ==
- Ingrid García-Jonsson as Marimar Cuena Seisdedos / Tamara / Yurena, a singer and television personality from Santurtzi and the daughter of Margarita and Floreal; García-Jonsson also portrays a version of Marimar who never became a singer and stayed in her hometown
- Secun de la Rosa as Leonardo Dantés, a songwriter, melodic singer, and poet from San Vicente de Alcántara
- Natalia de Molina as Loly Álvarez, a struggling singer from Gualchos who created "No cambié" along with Dantés before it became a hit song
- Pepón Nieto as Tony Genil, a seasoned singer from Puente Genil who claims to have fed Michael Jackson with a dish of Macaroni with tomato
- Carlos Areces as Paco Porras, a misogynist right-wing seer and television personality who claims to see the future in fruits and vegetables
- Rocío Ibáñez as Margarita Seisdedos, Tamara's overprotective mother who defends her daughter with a bag containing a brick
- Julián Villagrán as Miguel de Diego "Arlekín", Tamara's manager and occasional clown
- Sofía González as Tamarita, 13-year-old version of Tamara
- Nacho Vigalondo as Joaquín Sardana, television host of Tiempo de Marte; (Note: Based on Javier Sardá and his show Crónicas marcianas) Vigalondo also appears as narrator
- Terelu Campos as Teresa María Prados, host of El reino de las mañanas (Note: Based on María Teresa Campos and her show Día a día)
- Jorge Javier Vázquez as himself
- Alejandro Jato as Mario Vaquerizo, Tamara's late manager
- Drag Sethlas as Paco España
- Javier Gurruchaga as capricho del director (Note: Credited as capricho del director ('director's whim'), Gurruchaga plays several unnamed characters throughout the series. As a leader of a "Neither Right Nor Left" secret society behind tamarismo seeking to avert the rise of feminism in episode 4 ("Bring Me the Head of Paco Porras"), one of these characters is likened to Javier Cárdenas, reporter for Crónicas marcianas.)

== Production ==
A Suma Content (Javier Calvo and Javier Ambrossi) production for Netflix, the series was written by Nacho Vigalondo, María Bastarós, Paco Bezerra, and Claudia Costafreda. The six episodes were directed by Nacho Vigalondo and Claudia Costafreda.

== Release ==
Netflix released the series on 18 July 2025 alongside a tie-in documentary, I'm Still a Superstar (Spanish: Sigo siendo la misma).

== Episode list ==
No. overall	No. in season	Title	Directed by	Written by	Original release date
1	1	"Margarita Seisdedos Drops a Brick" (Margarita Seisdedos y la crisis del ladrillo)	Nacho Vigalondo	Nacho Vigalondo, María Bastarós	18 July 2025
2	2	"The Strange Case of Dr. Leonardo and Mr. Dantés" (El extraño caso del doctor Leonardo y míster Dantés)	Claudia Costafreda	Nacho Vigalondo, María Bastarós	18 July 2025
3	3	"Loly Álvarez and Arlekin in the Lost Highway" (Loly Álvarez y Arlekin en la carretera podrida)	Claudia Costafreda	Claudia Costafreda, Nacho Vigalondo	18 July 2025
4	4	"Bring Me the Head of Paco Porras" (Quiero la cabeza de Paco Porras)	Nacho Vigalondo	Nacho Vigalondo, María Bastarós	18 July 2025
5	5	"Tony Genil and the Bohemian Shadows" (Tony Genil y las 'losers' de Bohemia)	Claudia Costafreda	Paco Bezerra	18 July 2025
6	6	"The Ballad of Marimar Cuena Seisdedos" (La balada de Marimar Cuena Seisdedos)	Nacho Vigalondo	Nacho Vigalondo	18 July 2025

== Reception ==
On the review aggregator website Rotten Tomatoes, 78% of 9 critics' reviews are positive, with an average rating of 7.8/10.

Ricardo Rosado of Fotogramas rated the miniseries 5 out of 5 stars, writing the Vigalondo does not hide a "radical act of love for the fascinating, for the frontiers of the traditional and for the capacity of the narrative to make canonical what was clearly impossible".

Alfonso Rivera of Cineuropa assessed that "while the pathetic, grotesque and delirious go hand in hand, the series also overflows with glitter, unbridled imagination and a baroque flair".

Andrea G. Bermejo of Cinemanía deemed the first and last episodes to be "masterpieces that are already part of the history of Spanish television".

Raquel Hernández Luján of HobbyConsolas gave Superestar 55 points ('so-so') lamenting that "it is a very uneven series that takes us back to a shameful period of television. It is even embarrassing to travel to this past".

Natalia Marcos of El País pointed out that Vigalondo approaches Tamarismo "from a surrealistic point of view, in many moments Lynchian, to portray grotesque characters with a good load of poignancy".

== Accolades ==
Year	Award	Category	Nominee(s)	Result	Ref.
2025	72nd Ondas Awards	Best Actor	Secun de la Rosa	Won	
2025	31st Forqué Awards	Best Actress in a Series	Ingrid García-Jonsson	Nominated	
2026	13th Feroz Awards	Best Comedy Series		Nominated	
2026	13th Feroz Awards	Best Main Actress in a Series	Ingrid García-Jonsson	Nominated	
2026	13th Feroz Awards	Best Supporting Actress in a Series	Natalia de Molina	Nominated	
2026	13th Feroz Awards	Best Supporting Actress in a Series	Rocío Ibáñez	Nominated	
2026	13th Feroz Awards	Best Supporting Actor in a Series	Secun de la Rosa	Won	
2026	13th Feroz Awards	Best Screenplay in a Series	Nacho Vigalondo, María Bastarós, Paco Bezerra, Claudia Costafreda	Nominated	
2026	81st CEC Medals	Best Ensemble Cast in a Series		Nominated	
2026	34th Actors and Actresses Union Awards	Best Television Actress in a Leading Role	Ingrid García-Jonsson	Won	
2026	34th Actors and Actresses Union Awards	Best Television Actor in a Leading Role	Secun de la Rosas	Nominated	

== See also ==
- 2025 in Spanish television
