= Feroz Award for Best Main Actress in a Series =

Annual Spanish television award

The Feroz Award for Best Main Actress in a Series (Spanish: Premio a la Mejor Actriz Protagonista de una Serie) is one of the annual awards given at the Feroz Awards, presented by the Asociación de Informadores Cinematográficos de España. It was first bestowed in 2017, for the 4th edition of the awards, along with other five new television categories.

== Winners and nominees ==
Key	Meaning
‡	Indicates the winning actress.

=== 2010s ===
Year	Actress	Role(s)	English title	Original title	Ref.
2017 (4th)	Aura Garrido ‡	Amelia Folch	The Ministry of Time	El ministerio del tiempo	
2017 (4th)	Maggie Civantos	Macarena Ferreiro	Locked Up	Vis a vis	
2017 (4th)	Marta Etura	Marta Ribas	The Sonata of Silence	La sonata del silencio	
2017 (4th)	Najwa Nimri	Zulema Zahir	Locked Up	Vis a vis	
2017 (4th)	Verónica Sánchez	Clara López-Dóriga	El Caso. Crónica de sucesos		
2018 (5th)	Malena Alterio ‡	Nuria	Vergüenza		
2018 (5th)	Úrsula Corberó	Tokio	Money Heist	La casa de papel	
2018 (5th)	Aura Garrido	Amelia Folch	The Ministry of Time	El ministerio del tiempo	
2018 (5th)	Alexandra Jiménez	Julia Martos	La zona		
2018 (5th)	Blanca Portillo	Alicia Castro	I Know Who You Are	Sé quién eres	
2019 (6th)	Inma Cuesta ‡	Ana Mari	Arde Madrid		
2019 (6th)	Malena Alterio	Nuria	Vergüenza		
2019 (6th)	Aura Garrido	Carme Román	What the Future Holds	El día de mañana	
2019 (6th)	Najwa Nimri	Zulema Zahir	Locked Up	Vis a vis	
2019 (6th)	Eva Ugarte	Sandra	Mira lo que has hecho		

=== 2020s ===
Year	Actress	Role(s)	English title	Original title	Ref.
2020 (7th)	Candela Peña ‡	Candela Montes	Hierro		
2020 (7th)	Toni Acosta	Mayte Soldevilla	Señoras del (h)AMPA		
2020 (7th)	Laia Costa	Ella	Foodie Love		
2020 (7th)	Leticia Dolera	María Eugenia Aguado	Perfect Life	Vida perfecta	
2020 (7th)	Eva Ugarte	Sandra	Mira lo que has hecho		
2021 (8th)	Elena Irureta ‡	Bittori	Patria		
2021 (8th)	Ane Gabarain	Miren Uzkudun	Patria		
2021 (8th)	Vicky Luengo	Laia Urquijo	Riot Police	Antidisturbios	
2021 (8th)	Megan Montaner	Elena Echeverría	30 Coins	30 monedas	
2021 (8th)	Daniela Santiago	Cristina Ortiz, "La Veneno"	Veneno		
2022 (9th)	Ana Rujas ‡	María	Cardo		
2022 (9th)	Candela Peña	Candela Montes	Hierro		
2022 (9th)	Ana Polvorosa	Lucía Vallarta	La Fortuna		
2022 (9th)	Nadia de Santiago	Lina Ruiz	The Time It Takes	El tiempo que te doy	
2022 (9th)	Maribel Verdú	Ana Tramel	ANA. all in	Ana Tramel. El juego	
2023 (10th)	Claudia Salas ‡	Antonia Mochales, "Toni"	The Route	La ruta	
2023 (10th)	Nerea Barros	Elena Blanco	The Gypsy Bride	La novia gitana	
2023 (10th)	Itziar Ituño	Malen Zubiri	Intimacy	Intimidad	
2023 (10th)	Mónica López	Maite Estévez	Rapa		
2023 (10th)	Nathalie Poza	Carla	The Unit	La unidad	
2024 (11th)	Lola Dueñas ‡	Montserrat Baró	La mesías		
2024 (11th)	Úrsula Corberó	Rosa Peral	Burning Body	El cuerpo en llamas	
2024 (11th)	Macarena García	Irene / Encarnación	La mesías		
2024 (11th)	Esperanza Pedreño	Berta	Poquita fe		
2024 (11th)	Ana Rujas	Montserrat Baró	La mesías		
2025 (12th)	Nagore Aranburu	Miren Torres	Querer		
2025 (12th)	Mónica López	Maite Estévez	Rapa		
2025 (12th)	Carmen Machi	Sara Santano	Celeste		
2025 (12th)	Candela Peña	Rosario Porto	The Asunta Case	El caso Asunta	
2025 (12th)	Iria del Río	Ana	The New Years	Los años nuevos	
2025 (13th)	Anna Castillo	Pilar de Borbón	Su majestad		
2025 (13th)	Ingrid García-Jonsson	Tamara	Superstar	Superestar	
2025 (13th)	Esperanza Pedreño	Berta	Little Faith	Poquita fe	
2025 (13th)	Candela Peña	Nat	Rage	Furia	
2025 (13th)	Carla Quílez	Mar	Jakarta	Yakarta	
2025 (13th)	Carolina Yuste	Massiel	La canción		
