= To Our Friends (film) =

- Theatrical release poster
- Spanish: A nuestros amigos
- Directed by: Adrián Orr
- Screenplay by: Adrián Orr; Celso Jiménez; Samuel M. Delgado
- Starring: Sara Toledo; Pedro Izquierdo; Paula Mira
- Cinematography: Adrián Orr
- Edited by: Ana Pfaff
- Production companies: New Folder; El Viaje Films; Karô Filmes
- Release dates: April 2024 (Visions du Réel); 4 April 2025 (Spain)
- Countries: Spain; Portugal
- Language: Spanish

To Our Friends (Spanish: A nuestros amigos) is a 2024 documentary film directed by Adrián Orr.

== Subject ==
The documentary tracks four years of the life of Sara Toledo (a young woman of Cuban descent from the Carabanchel district and aspiring actress) starting when she was 17, some days before taking her Selectividad tests.

== Release ==
For its world premiere, the film made it to the ̣'International Feature Film Competition' section of the 55th Visions du Réel. The film was also programmed in the 'Meeting Point' section of the 69th Valladolid International Film Festival and the 2024 Cinespaña. It was released theatrically in Spain on 4 April 2025.

== Reception ==
Desirée de Fez of El Periódico de Catalunya rated the film 4 out of 5 stars, assessing that Orr finds an "extremely powerful" testimony about what it means to grow up in Sara's conversations.

Rubén Romero Santos of Cinemanía rated the film 4 out of 5 stars, declaring it an "impeccable portrait of the current urban youth".

Manuel J. Lombardo of Diario de Sevilla gave the film a 4-star rating, writing that the depiction of Sara's growth is an "always" a "fluid process" thanks to an "extraordinary editing work" and the "precise" distance between Orr's camera and his characters.

== Accolades ==
| Year | Award | Category | Nominee(s) | Result | Ref. |
|---|---|---|---|---|---|
| 2026 | 13th Feroz Awards | 'Holded Arrebato' Special Award (non-Fiction) | | Nominated | |

== See also ==
- List of Spanish films of 2025
