= Feroz Award for Best Trailer =

Annual Spanish film award

- Awarded for: Best Trailer for a Spanish Film
- Country: Spain
- Presented by: Asociación de Informadores Cinematográficos de España
- Currently held by: Miguel Ángel Trudu – They Will Be Dust (2025)

The Feroz Award for Best Trailer (Spanish: Premio Feroz al mejor tráiler) is one of the annual awards given at the Feroz Awards, presented by the Asociación de Informadores Cinematográficos de España.

It was first presented in 2014. The trailers for the films People in Places and I'm So Excited! were the first recipients of the award.

== Winners and nominees ==
=== 2010s ===
Year	English title	Original title	Recipient(s)/Work
2014	People in Places	Gente en sitios	Film trailer
2014	I'm So Excited!	Los amantes pasajeros	Film teaser
2014	Three Many Weddings	3 bodas de más	Film trailer
2014	Witching & Bitching	Las brujas de Zugarramurdi	Film trailer
2014	Cannibal	Caníbal	Film trailer
2015	Marshland	La isla mínima	Film trailer
2015	10,000 km	10.000 km	Film trailer
2015	Spanish Affair	Ocho apellidos vascos	Film trailer
2015	Carmina y amén		Film trailer
2015	Magical Girl		Film trailer
2016	The Bride	La novia	Film trailer
2016	Requirements to Be a Normal Person	Requisitos para ser una persona normal	Teaser 1
2016	Spy Time	Anacleto: agente secreto	Film trailer
2016	Retribution	El desconocido	Film trailer
2016	My Big Night	Mi gran noche	Film trailer
2017	Kiki, Love to Love	Kiki, el amor se hace	Film trailer
2017	Smoke & Mirrors	El hombre de las mil caras	Film trailer
2017	Julieta		Film trailer
2017	A Monster Calls		Film trailer
2017	May God Save Us	Que Dios nos perdone	Film trailer
2018	Holy Camp!	La llamada	Alberto Gutiérrez
2018	Summer 1993	Estiu 1993	Miguel A. Trudu
2018	The Bar	El bar	Rafa Martínez
2018	Skins	Pieles	Rafa Martínez
2018	Verónica		Rafa Martínez
2018	The Motive	El autor	Fernando Vallarino
2019	Quién te cantará		Miguel Ángel Trudu
2019	Carmen & Lola	Carmen y Lola	Pedro Jiménez
2019	Everybody Knows	Todos lo saben	Asghar Farhadi
2019	The Realm	El reino	Rafa Martín
2019	Champions	Campeones	Miguel Ángel Trudu and Rafa Martínez

=== 2020s ===
Year	English title	Original title	Recipient(s)
2020	Bye	Adiós	Miguel Ángel Trudu
2020	Pain and Glory	Dolor y gloria	Jorge Luengo
2020	While at War	Mientras dure la guerra	Rafa Martínez
2020	The Platform	El hoyo	Raúl López
2020	Fire Will Come	O que arde	Marcos Flórez
2021	Unfortunate Stories	Historias lamentables	Javier Fesser and Rafa Martínez
2021	Rosa's Wedding	La boda de Rosa	Juan Santiago
2021	Coven	Akelarre	Marta Longas and Rafa Martínez
2021	My Heart Goes Boom!	Explota Explota	Miguel Ángel Trudu
2021	Schoolgirls	Las niñas	Mariana Francisco and Juan Gabriel García Román
2022	The Grandmother	La abuela	Miguel Ángel Trudu
2022	The Good Boss	El buen patrón	Maurits Malschaert and Mick Aerts
2022	Outlaws	Las leyes de la frontera	Miguel Ángel Sanantonio
2022	Parallel Mothers	Madres paralelas	Alberto Leal
2022	Maixabel		Rafa Martínez
2023	Piggy	Cerdita	Marta Longás
2023	The Beasts	As bestas	Miguel Ángel Trudu
2023	Manticore	Mantícora	Miguel Ángel Trudu
2023	Prison 77	Modelo 77	Aitor Tapia
2023	God's Crooked Lines	Los renglones torcidos de Dios	Pedro J. Bernardo
2024	Society of the Snow	La sociedad de la nieve	Harry Eaton
2024	20,000 Species of Bees	20.000 especies de abejas	Liviu Neagoe
2024	Close Your Eyes	Cerrar los ojos	Elena Gutiérrez
2024	Jokes & Cigarettes	Sabel aquell	Miguel Ángel Sanantonio
2024	Love & Revolution	Te estoy amando locamente	Mikel Garmilla
2025	They Will Be Dust	Polvo serán	Miguel Ángel Trudu
2025	The Room Next Door		Alberto Leal
2025	Undercover	La infiltrada	Javier Morales
2025	Marco, the Invented Truth	Marco	Omar Bermúdez, Carlos Berot
2025	The Red Virgin	La virgen roja	Marta Longás, Jesús Fernández García
2026	The Dinner	La cena	Alberto de Toro
2026	Maspalomas		Mikel Garmilla
2026	Sundays	Los domingos	Aitor Tapia, Manel Barriere
2026	Romería		Miguel Ángel Trudu
2026	Sirāt		Aitor Tapia
