= 9th ALMA Awards (Spain) =

- Date: 26 March 2026
- Venue: Cine Capitol, Madrid, Spain
- Presented by: ALMA
- Hosted by: Javi Valero; Yaiza Nuevo

The 9th ALMA Awards ceremony, presented by ALMA, the screenwriters' union of Spain, took place on 26 March 2026 at the Cine Capitol in Madrid. The gala was written and hosted by Javi Valero and Yaiza Nuevo.

The writing team of Polònia was announced in advance as the recipient of the ALMA Honorary Award, that was delivered to Toni Soler.

== Winners and nominees ==
The winners and nominees are listed as follows:

Best Screenplay in a Feature Film (Drama): Alauda Ruiz de Azúa — Sundays; Jose Mari Goenaga ― Maspalomas; Eva Libertad ― Deaf	Best Screenplay in a Feature Film (Comedy): Yolanda García Serrano, Manuel Gómez Pereira, Joaquín Oristrell ― The Dinner; Borja Cobeaga, Valentina Viso ― Breaking Walls; Cesc Gay, Eduard Sola ― My Friend Eva
Best Screenplay in a Series (Drama): Fran Araújo, Rafael Cobos, Alberto Rodríguez ― The Anatomy of a Moment; Leticia Dolera, David Gallart, Almudena Monzú ― Pubertat; Diego San José, Daniel Castro, Fernando Delgado-Hierro ― Jakarta	Best Screenplay in a Series (Comedy): Juan Maidagán, Pepón Montero ― Little Faith; Víctor García León, Araceli Álvarez de Sotomayor, Germán Aparicio, Ana Boyero, Daniel Castro ― Old Dog, New Tricks; Cristóbal Garrido, Adolfo Valor ― La vida breve
Best Screenplay in a Feature Film (Documentary): Isaki Lacuesta, Elena Molina ― Flores para Antonio; Juan Cavestany ― Madrid. Ext.; Albert Serra ― Afternoons of Solitude	Best Screenplay in a Series (Documentary): Marc Cases, Ignasi Gisbert, Martí Haro, Minaia Llorca, Nil Montilla, Javi Oms, Anna Punsí, Xènia Sanromà ― Crimes; Kike Costas, Irene del Cerro, Noemí Redondo ― Expediente Vallecas; Manel Lucas ― Los archivos secretos del NO-DO
Best Screenplay in a Daily Series: Beatriz Duque, Verónica Viñé, Jordi Calafí, Eulàlia Carrillo, Mauricio Romero, Roberto Goñi, Alexis García Pérez de Medina, Bárbara Alpuente, Julia Altares, Luis Chover, Rocío Chozas, Mercedes Cruz, Guillermo Escobedo, Carlos Falces, Matías García, Ernesto Grimaldi, Beatriz González Cruz, Laura Molpeceres, Ana Muniz da Cunha, Federico Muñoz Alonso, Manel Nofuentes, Nacho Pérez de la Paz, Clara Pérez Escrivá, Susana Sánchez Carvajal, Laura Solana Erdozain, Almudena Vázquez ― Sueños de libertad; Carmen Llano, Susana Prieto, Juanma Ruiz Córdoba, Álvaro Bermúdez de Castro, Miguel Bueno, Christian Escamilla, Rafa Gallego, Moisés Gómez Ramos, Alberto Grondona, Félix J. Velando ― La Promesa; David Casany, Ruth García, Arantxa Cuesta, Miriam García Montero, Quico López, David Oliva, Juan Vicente Pozuelo, Santiago Tabuenca ― Valle salvaje	Best Screenplay in a Show: Diego Fabiano, Rubén Ajaú, Manuel Álvarez, Elena Beltrán, Danny Boy-Rivera, Miguel Campos, Yunez Chaib, Xavi Daura, Javier Díaz-Pinés, Sandra Flores, Helena Pozuelo, Iggy Rubín, Javi Valera ― La Revuelta; Alejandro Alcaraz, Elena Beltrán, Jesús Caballero, Pilar de Francisco, Mario de la Mano, Laura del Val, Pablo González Batista, Toño Pérez, Jero Rodríguez, Carlos Sanandrés, Arantxa Soroa, Álvaro Velasco, Antonio Vicente ― Cachitos de hierro y cromo; Eduardo García Eyo, David Dato, Iratxe Fernández de Velasco, Lucas Fuentes, Manuel Gay, Alberto González Vázquez, Olalla Granja, Diego López Escribano, David Navas, Yaiza Nuevo, Alberto P. Castaños, Carlos Pérez Uribe, Carles Sánchez, Diego Saucedo, Jesús Torres, Mikel Uribe-Etxebarria, Irene Varela ― El intermedio
Best Screenplay in a Game Show: Pablo Corbacho, Laura Figueredo, Miguel Ángel Gómez, Aitor Ormaetxea, Emese Sobrino ― Cifras y letras; Joserra Fudio, Raquel Buigues, Gustavo García, Lluis Mosquera, José Ovejas ― Drag Race España; Pepa Maymó, Lourdes Alegre, Aram Bonmatí, Arnau Creus, Carmen Fernández, Jesús Martínez, Ramón Micó, Marc Montañés, Marina Ortuño, Albert París, Marisa Pérez, Mireia Pou, Júlia Puig, Mireia Uribesalgo ― Saber y ganar
