= 81st CEC Awards =

Spanish film awards

- Date: 23 February 2026
- Site: Palacio de la Prensa, Madrid, Spain
- Hosted by: María Adánez
- Organized by: Círculo de Escritores Cinematográficos

Highlights
- Most awards: Sundays (6)
- Most nominations: Sundays (10)

The 81st CEC Medals ceremony, presented by the Círculo de Escritores Cinematográficos, took place on 23 February 2026 at the Palacio de la Prensa in Madrid. The ceremony was hosted by María Adánez.

== Winners and nominees ==
The winners and nominees are listed as follows:

=== Film ===
Best Film: Sundays; Sirāt; Maspalomas; Deaf	Best Animation Film: Decorado; Awakening Beauty; The Treasure of Barracuda; The Light of Aisha
Best Director: Alauda Ruiz de Azúa – Sundays; Carla Simón – Romería; Oliver Laxe – Sirāt; Albert Serra – Afternoons of Solitude	Best New Director: Eva Libertad – Deaf; Rafael Cobos – Golpes; Gemma Blasco – Fury; Carlos Solano – Leo & Lou
Best Original Screenplay: Alauda Ruiz de Azúa – Sundays; Oliver Laxe, Santiago Fillol – Sirāt; Agustín Díaz Yanes – She Walks in Darkness; Avelina Prat – The Portuguese House	Best Adapted Screenplay: Eva Libertad – Deaf; Joaquín Oristrell, Manuel Gómez Pereira, Yolanda García Serrano – The Dinner; Carla Simón – Romería; Santiago Requejo – All in Favor
Best Actor: Manolo Solo – The Portuguese House; Alberto San Juan – The Dinner; Miguel Garcés – Sundays; Sergi López – Sirāt	Best Actress: Patricia López Arnaiz – Sundays; Bárbara Lennie – Los Tigres; Nora Navas – My Friend Eva; Susana Abaitua – She Walks in Darkness
Best Supporting Actor: Álvaro Cervantes – Deaf; Miguel Rellán – The Captive; Luis Tosar – Golpes; Juan Minujín – Sundays	Best Supporting Actress: Nagore Aranburu – Sundays; Elvira Mínguez – The Dinner; Elena Irureta – Deaf; Maria de Medeiros – The Portuguese House
Best New Actor: Julio Peña – The Captive; Mitch – Romería; Fer Fraga – Band Together; Jordi Catalán – Wolfgang	Best New Actress: Blanca Soroa – Sundays; Llúcia Garcia – Romería; Judith Fernández – Band Together; Miriam Garlo – Deaf
Best Cinematography: Mauro Herce – Sirāt; Álex Catalán – The Captive; Bet Rourich – Sundays; Pau Esteve Birba – Los Tigres; Hélène Louvart – Romería	Best Editing: Cristóbal Fernández – Sirāt; Andrés Gil – Sundays; José M. G. Moyano – Los Tigres; Marta Velasco – Deaf; Bernat Vilaplana – She Walks in Darkness
Best Music: Kangding Ray – Sirāt; Alejandro Amenábar – The Captive; Julio de la Rosa – Los Tigres; Vincent Barrière – The Portuguese House	Best Documentary Film: Flores para Antonio; Eloy de la Iglesia. Adicto al cine; Afternoons of Solitude; The Sleeper. El Caravaggio perdido
Best Foreign Film: Frankenstein; A Simple Accident; One Battle After Another; Sentimental Value

Films with multiple nominations
Nominations	Film
10	Sundays
7	Sirāt
7	Deaf
5	Romería
4	Los Tigres
4	The Portuguese House
4	The Captive
3	She Walks in Darkness
3	The Dinner
2	Afternoons of Solitude
2	Golpes
2	Band Together

Films with multiple awards
Awards	Film
6	Sundays
3	Sirāt
3	Deaf

=== Series ===
Best Series: The Anatomy of a Moment; La canción; Little Faith; Jakarta	Best Ensemble Cast in a Series: The Anatomy of a Moment; Sueños de libertad; Little Faith; Superstar; Jakarta
