= Álvaro Cervantes =

Spanish actor (born 1989)

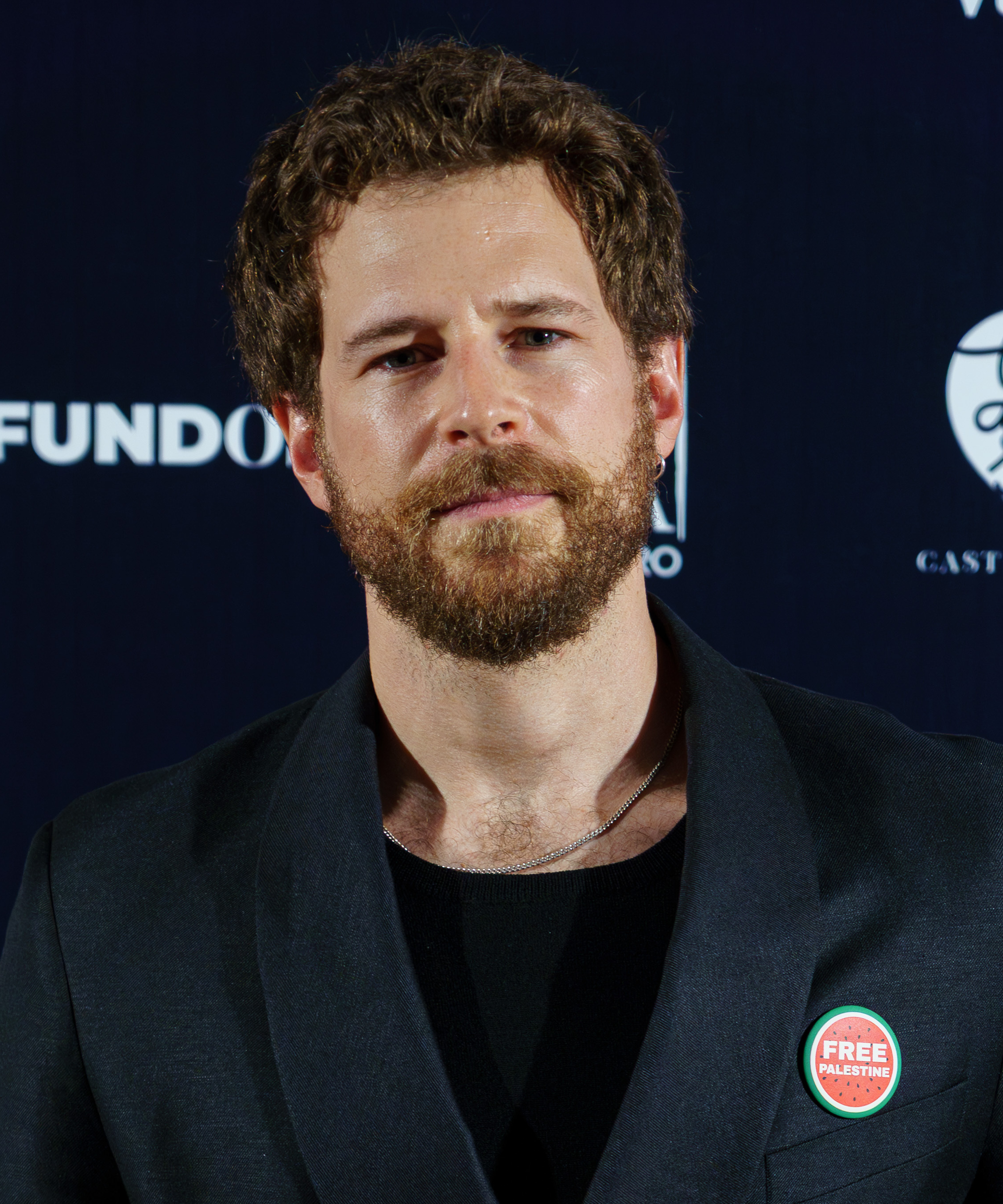
- Cervantes in 2025
- Born: Álvaro Cervantes Sorribas; 12 September 1989 (age 37); Barcelona, Spain
- Occupation: Actor
- Relatives: Ángela Cervantes (sister)

Álvaro Cervantes Sorribas (born 12 September 1989) is a Spanish actor.

== Life and career ==
Álvaro Cervantes Sorribas was born in Barcelona on 12 September 1989. His younger sister Ángela has also pursued an acting career.

Cervantes made a name for himself in television dramas. From 2015 to 2016, he starred as the protagonist Emperor Charles V in the historical drama television series Carlos, rey emperador.

He featured in the 2016 historical drama film 1898, Our Last Men in the Philippines, and in the 2017 television series La zona as a policeman.

== Filmography ==
=== Film ===
Year	Title	Role	Notes	Ref.
2008	Pretextos	Lucas		
2009	El juego del ahorcado	David		
2010	Tres metros sobre el cielo	Pollo		
2011	Hanna	Feliciano		
2012	El Sexo de los Ángeles	Rai		
2012	Tengo ganas de ti	Pollo		
2012	88	Joel		
2014	El corazón del océano	Alonso		
2016	1898, Los últimos de Filipinas	Soldado Carlos		
2018	The Tree of Blood	Marc		
2019	Bajo el mismo techo	Nacho		
2019	The Legacy of the Bones	Dr. Berasategui		
2020	Adú	Mateo		
2020	Offering to the Storm	Dr. Berasategui		
2020	The devil's clocks	Aurelio Vizcaino		
2020	Malnazidos	Mecha		
2020	Loco por ella (Crazy About Her)	Adri		
2020	Donde caben dos (More the Merrier)	Raúl		
2022	42 segundos	Manel Estiarte		
2023	Eres tú (Love at First Kiss)	Javier		
2024	Ramón and Ramón (Ramón y Ramón)	Mateo		
2025	Deaf (Sorda)	Héctor		
2025	Esmorza amb mi (Join Me for Breakfast)	Omar		
2026	Balandrau, vent salvatge (Balandrau, Where the Fierce Wind Blew)	Josep Maria		
2026	Colisión (Collision Course)	Raúl		

=== Television ===
Year	Title	Role
2011	Punta Escarlata	Marcos
2011	Meublé La Casita Blanca	Mar
2012-13	Luna, el misterio de Calenda	Joel
2014	Hermanos	Alberto Torres
2015	Los nuestros	Alonso
2015-16	Carlos, rey emperador	Charles V, Holy Roman Emperor
2016	Cites	Dani
2017	La zona	Martín Garrido
2019	Brigada Costa del Sol	Leo Villa

== Accolades ==
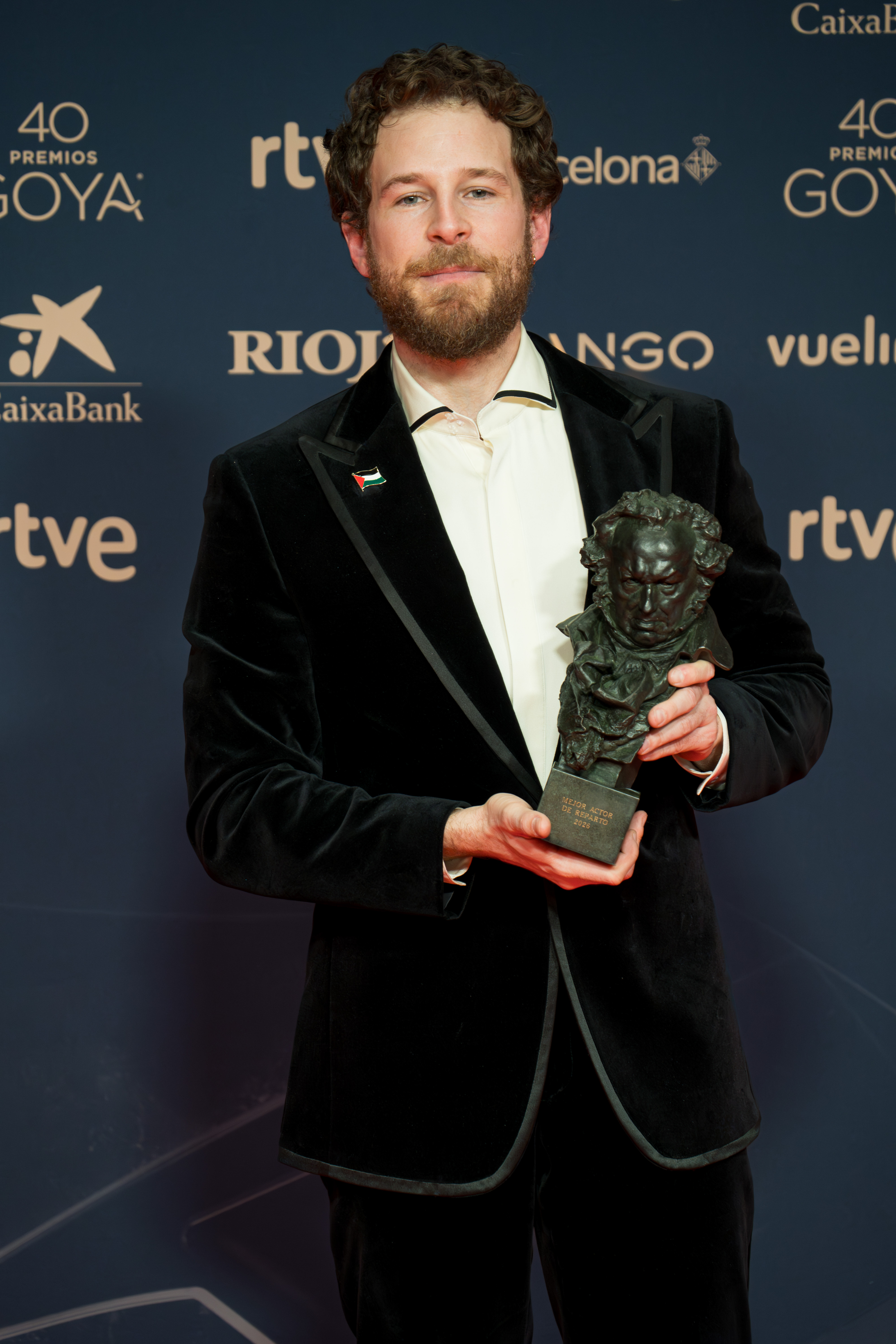
Cervantes holding his Goya Award for Best Supporting Actor for Deaf

Year	Award	Category	Work	Result	Ref.
2009	23rd Goya Awards	Best New Actor	The Hanged Man	Nominated	
2021	35th Goya Awards	Best Supporting Actor	Adú	Nominated	
2025	31st Forqué Awards	Best Actor in a Film	Deaf	Nominated	
2026	13th Feroz Awards	Best Main Actor in a Film	Deaf	Nominated	
2026	18th Gaudí Awards	Best Actor	Join Me for Breakfast	Nominated	
2026	18th Gaudí Awards	Best Supporting Actor	Deaf	Won	
2026	81st CEC Medals	Best Supporting Actor	Deaf	Won	
2026	40th Goya Awards	Best Supporting Actor	Deaf	Won	
2026	34th Actors and Actresses Union Awards	Best Film Actor in a Secondary Role	Deaf	Won	
2026	13th Platino Awards	Best Supporting Actor	Deaf	Won	
