= La canción (TV series) =

- Promotional release poster
- Genre: Historical drama
- Created by: Pepe Coira; Fran Araújo
- Written by: Pepe Coira; Fran Araújo
- Directed by: Alejandro Marín
- Starring: Carolina Yuste; Patrick Criado; Àlex Brendemühl; Marcel Borràs
- Country of origin: Spain
- Original language: Spanish
- No. of seasons: 1
- No. of episodes: 3

Production
- Cinematography: Andreu Ortoll
- Production company: Buendía Estudios

Original release
- Network: Movistar Plus+
- Release: 8 May 2025

La canción is a Spanish historical drama miniseries created by Pepe Coira and Fran Araújo, and directed by Alejandro Marín for Movistar Plus+. It explores Spain's winning run at the Eurovision Song Contest 1968, and it stars Carolina Yuste as Massiel.

== Plot ==
Ambitious Televisión Española executive Esteban Guerra teams up with eccentric Artur Kaps to find the appropriate song and artist to represent Spain at the Eurovision Song Contest 1968. After several setbacks in the so-called 'Operación Eurovisión', including the depart of singer Joan Manuel Serrat, his replacement Massiel will go on to win the contest with the catchy song "La, la, la".

== Cast ==
- Carolina Yuste as Massiel
- Patrick Criado as Esteban Guerra
- Àlex Brendemühl as Artur Kaps
- Marcel Borràs as Joan Manuel Serrat
- Mariano Peña as Lasso de la Vega
- Carlos Santos as Antonio Balmaseda
- Laia Manzanares as Lucía
- Carlos González as Rafael Ibarbia
- Eneko Sagardoy as Carlos
- Xose A. Touriñán as Manuel Fraga
- Luis G. Gámez as Francisco Franco
- Chloe Berman as Katie Boyle
- Garmon Rhys as Cliff Richard

== Production ==
The series is a Buendía Estudios production for Movistar Plus+. It was primarily shot in Madrid with additional footage shot in London and Paris. Among the sets built for filming was a full-scale replica of the Eurovision Song Contest 1968 stage and scoreboard.

== Release ==
La canción made it to the television series programme of the 28th Málaga Film Festival's official selection. The three-episode miniseries premiered on Movistar Plus+ on 8 May 2025.

== Accolades ==
Year	Award	Category	Nominee(s)	Result	Ref.
2025	31st Forqué Awards	Best Actress in a Series	Carolina Yuste	Nominated	
2026	27th Iris Awards	Best Fiction Screenplay	Pepe Coira, Fran Araújo	Pending	
2026	13th Feroz Awards	Best Drama Series		Nominated	
2026	13th Feroz Awards	Best Main Actress in a Series	Carolina Yuste	Nominated	
2026	81st CEC Medals	Best Series		Nominated	

== See also ==
- 2025 in Spanish television
