= Silence (miniseries) =

Spanish television series

- Promotional release poster
- Spanish: Silencio
- Written by: Eduardo Casanova
- Directed by: Eduardo Casanova
- Starring: Lucía Díez; María León; Ana Polvorosa; Leticia Dolera; Mariola Fuentes; Carolina Rubio; Omar Ayuso
- Music by: Joan Vilà
- Country of origin: Spain
- Original language: Spanish
- No. of seasons: 1
- No. of episodes: 3

Production
- Executive producers: Eduardo Casanova; Javier Prada
- Producer: Javier Prada
- Cinematography: Marino Pardo
- Running time: 56 minutes
- Production companies: Gamera Studios; Apoyo Positivo; Antonio Abeledo

Original release
- Network: Movistar Plus+
- Release: 1 December 2025

Silence (Spanish: Silencio) is a Spanish fantasy tragicomedy miniseries written and directed by Eduardo Casanova. It tackles queer female vampires, the Black Plague, and the HIV/AIDS pandemics. It premiered at the 78th Locarno Film Festival in August 2025.

== Plot ==
Taking place in different timelines, the plot explores the plight of a family of queer vampire sisters and their descendants, facing the issue of human blood contamination in the Europe devastated by the Black Plague, and centuries later, in 1980s HIV-stricken Spain.

== Cast ==
- Leticia Dolera
- María León
- Ana Polvorosa
- Omar Ayuso
- Lucía Díez
- Mariola Fuentes
- Carolina Rubio

== Production ==
The series was produced by Gamera Studios along with Apoyo Positivo and Antonio Abeledo S.L.

== Release ==
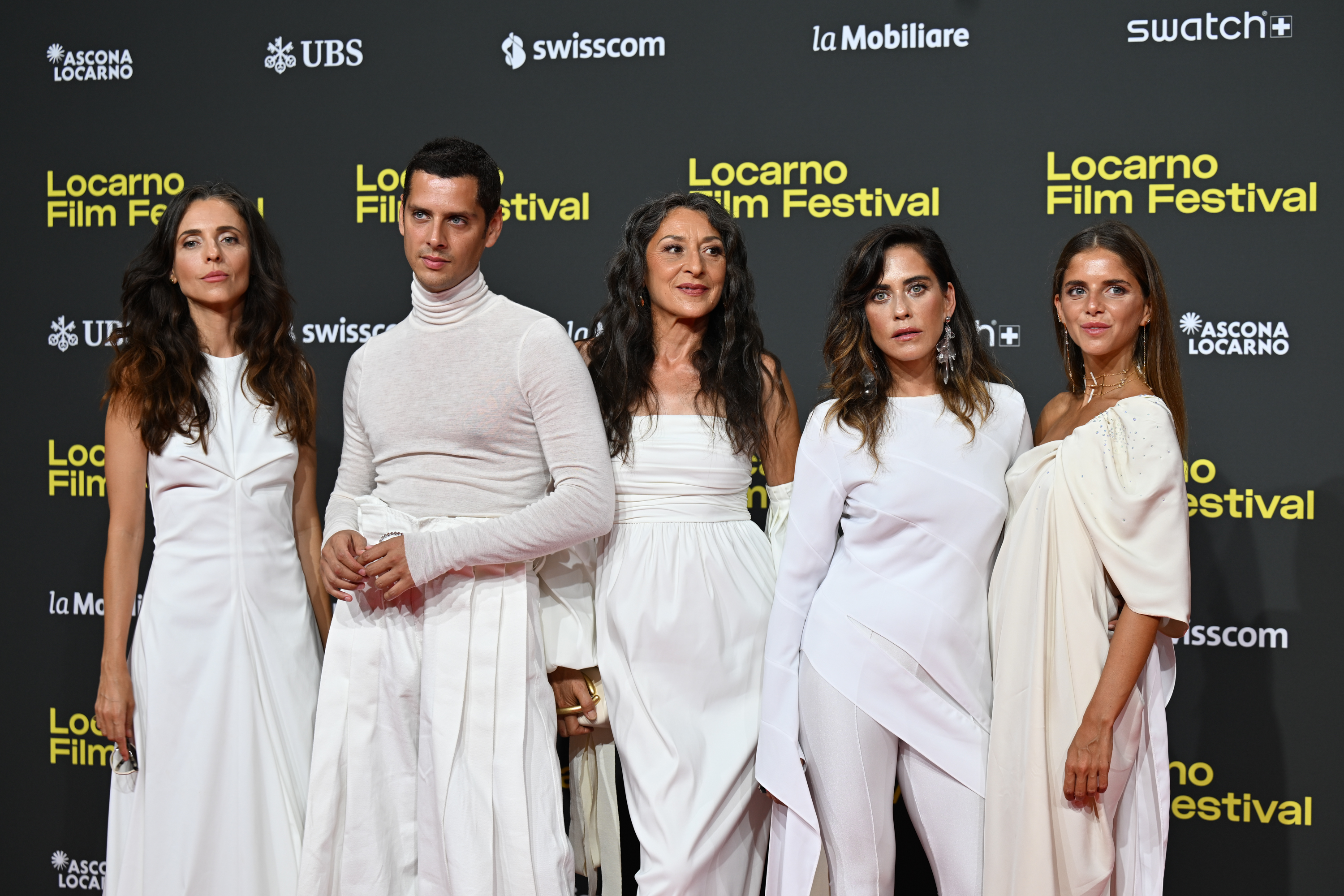
Dolera, Casanova, Fuentes, León, and Díez attending the Locarno Film Festival on 10 August 2025

The miniseries was presented in an out-of-competition slot of the 78th Locarno Film Festival in August 2025. Its festival run also included selection for screenings at the 20th Fantastic Fest (for its North-American premiere) and the 58th Sitges Film Festival, where it was marketed as a Movistar Plus+ original series with a 1 December 2025 (World AIDS Day) launch date on the platform.

== Reception ==
Alfonso Rivera of Cineuropa wrote that Silence's "striking imagery", "delirious dialogue and histrionic performances refuse to be tamed or pigeonholed. They are pure rebellion, just like the characters themselves".

While the miniseries had no guaranteed distribution at the time of its Locarno presentation, the use of inclusive language in the dialogues managed to polarise social media users, with some applauding it as a coherent choice in line with the artistic proposal while other decrying it as a "gratuitous provocation."

== See also ==
- 2025 in Spanish television
