= Pubertat =

- Created by: Leticia Dolera
- Directed by: Leticia Dolera
- Starring: Leticia Dolera
- Countries of origin: Spain; Belgium
- Original language: Catalan
- No. of episodes: 6

Production
- Production companies: Distinto Films; Corte y Confección de Películas; Uri Films; 3Cat; AT-Productions

Original release
- Network: HBO Max
- Release: 24 September 2025

Pubertat – Secrets, Lies, and Human Castles (Catalan: Pubertat) is a 2025 drama television series created and directed by Leticia Dolera.

== Plot ==
The plot follows sociologist and activist Júlia Esparver as she deals with accusations of sexual aggression targeted at her son Roger, Roger's cousin and cousin's friend as they reportedly abused a fellow member of a colla castellera (association of castellers).

== Cast ==
- Leticia Dolera as Júlia Esparver
- Bruno Bistuer Farré as Roger
- Betsy Túrnez as Estel
- Xavi Sáez
- Biel Durán
- Anna Alarcón
- Pep Munné
- Jean Cruz
- Vicky Peña
- Aina Martínez
- Ot Serra
- Nael Gamell
- Carla Quílez

== Production ==
The series was produced by Distinto Films, Corte y Confección de Películas, Uri Films, and 3Cat alongside AT-Productions, with backing from ICEC and Creative Europe MEDIA.

== Release ==
The series was programmed for a presentation on 22 September 2025 at the 73rd San Sebastián International Film Festival ahead of its HBO Max streaming debut in Spain on 24 September 2025. Beta Film acquired international distribution rights to the series. German-French public broadcaster ARTE and German public broadcaster SWR acquired distribution rights from Beta Film.

== Accolades ==
Year	Award	Category	Nominee(s)	Result	Ref.
2025	72nd Ondas Awards	Best Drama Series		Won	
2026	13th Feroz Awards	Best Drama Series		Nominated	
2026	13th Feroz Awards	Best Supporting Actress in a Series	Betsy Túrnez	Nominated	
2026	9th ALMA Awards	Best Screenplay in a Drama Series	Leticia Dolera, David Gallart, Almudena Monzú	Nominated	

== See also ==
- 2025 in Spanish television
