= Feroz Award for Best Main Actor in a Series =

Annual Spanish television award

The Feroz Award for Best Main Actor in a Series (Spanish: Premio al Mejor Actror Protagonista de una Serie) is one of the annual awards given at the Feroz Awards, presented by the Asociación de Informadores Cinematográficos de España. It was first bestowed in 2017, for the 4th edition of the awards, along with other five new television categories.

== Winners and nominees ==
Key	Meaning
‡	Indicates the winning actor.

=== 2010s ===
Year	Actor	Role(s)	English title	Original title	Ref.
2017 (4th)	Brays Efe ‡	Paquita Salas	Paquita Salas		
2017 (4th)	Pedro Casablanc	Juan Rueda	Mar de plástico		
2017 (4th)	Nacho Fresneda	Alonso de Entrerríos	The Ministry of Time	El ministerio del tiempo	
2017 (4th)	Rodolfo Sancho	Julián Martínez	The Ministry of Time	El ministerio del tiempo	
2017 (4th)	Fernando Guillén Cuervo	Jesús Expósito	El Caso. Crónica de sucesos		
2018 (5th)	Javier Gutiérrez ‡	Jesús Gutiérrez Montejo	Vergüenza		
2018 (5th)	Eduard Fernández	Héctor Uría	La zona		
2018 (5th)	Francesc Garrido	Juan Elías Giner	I Know Who You Are	Sé quién eres	
2018 (5th)	Álvaro Morte	Sergio Marquina "El profesor"	Money Heist	La casa de papel	
2018 (5th)	Hugo Silva	Jesús Méndez "Pacino"	The Ministry of Time	El ministerio del tiempo	
2019 (6th)	Javier Rey ‡	Sito Miñanco	Cocaine Coast	Fariña	
2019 (6th)	Brays Efe	Paquita Salas	Paquita Salas		
2019 (6th)	Javier Gutiérrez	Jesús Gutiérrez Montejo	Vergüenza		
2019 (6th)	Paco León	Manolo	Arde Madrid		
2019 (6th)	Oriol Pla	Justo Gil	What the Future Holds	El día de mañana	

=== 2020s ===
Year	Actor	Role(s)	English title	Original title	Ref.
2020 (7th)	Javier Cámara ‡	Juan Carrasco	Vota Juan		
2020 (7th)	Brays Efe	Paquita Salas	Paquita Salas		
2020 (7th)	Darío Grandinetti	Antonio Díaz Martínez	Hierro		
2020 (7th)	Álvaro Morte	Sergio Marquina "El profesor"	Money Heist	La casa de papel	
2020 (7th)	Miguel Ángel Silvestre	Pablo Ibar	En el corredor de la muerte		
2021 (8th)	Eduard Fernández ‡ (TIE)	Padre Manuel Vergara	30 Coins	30 monedas	
2021 (8th)	Hovik Keuchkerian ‡ (TIE)	Salvador Osorio	Riot Police	Antidisturbios	
2021 (8th)	Raúl Arévalo	Diego López Rodero	Riot Police	Antidisturbios	
2021 (8th)	Javier Cámara	Juan Carrasco	Vamos Juan		
2021 (8th)	Álex García	Alexánder Parra Rosales	Riot Police	Antidisturbios	
2022 (9th)	Javier Cámara ‡	Juan Carrasco	Venga Juan		
2022 (9th)	Álvaro Cervantes	Nicolás Torres	The Time It Takes	El tiempo que te doy	
2022 (9th)	Darío Grandinetti	Antonio Díaz Martínez	Hierro		
2022 (9th)	Daniel Grao	Hugo Ibarra Toledo	HIT		
2022 (9th)	Javier Gutiérrez	Francisco Javier Maldonado, "Paco El Cóndor"	Reyes de la noche		
2023 (10th)	Juan Diego Botto ‡	Pablo Lopetegui	I Don't Like Driving	No me gusta conducir	
2023 (10th)	Luis Callejo	Ernesto	Offworld	Apagón	
2023 (10th)	Javier Cámara	Tomás Hernández	Rapa		
2023 (10th)	Álex García	José Antonio Ortiz	El Inmortal. Gangs of Madrid	El inmortal	
2023 (10th)	Àlex Monner	Marc Ribó	The Route	La ruta	
2024 (11th)	Roger Casamajor ‡	Enric Puig Baró / Isaías	La mesías		
2024 (11th)	Javier Cámara	Tomás Hernández	Rapa		
2024 (11th)	Raúl Cimas	José Ramón	Poquita fe		
2024 (11th)	Patrick Criado	Manuel Flores, "La Vespa"	Nights in Tefía	Las noches de Tefía	
2024 (11th)	Quim Gutiérrez	Albert López Ferrer	Burning Body	El cuerpo en llamas	
2025 (12th)	Oriol Pla ‡	Javier Giner	I, Addict	Yo, adicto	
2025 (12th)	Francesco Carril	Óscar	The New Years	Los años nuevos	
2025 (12th)	Pedro Casablanc	Iñigo Gorosmendi	Querer		
2025 (12th)	Alberto San Juan	Cristóbal Balenciaga	Cristóbal Balenciaga		
2025 (12th)	Tristán Ulloa	Alfonso Basterra	The Asunta Case	El caso Asunta	
