= Palace of Duques de Pastrana =

- Palacio de los Duques de Pastrana (Spanish)
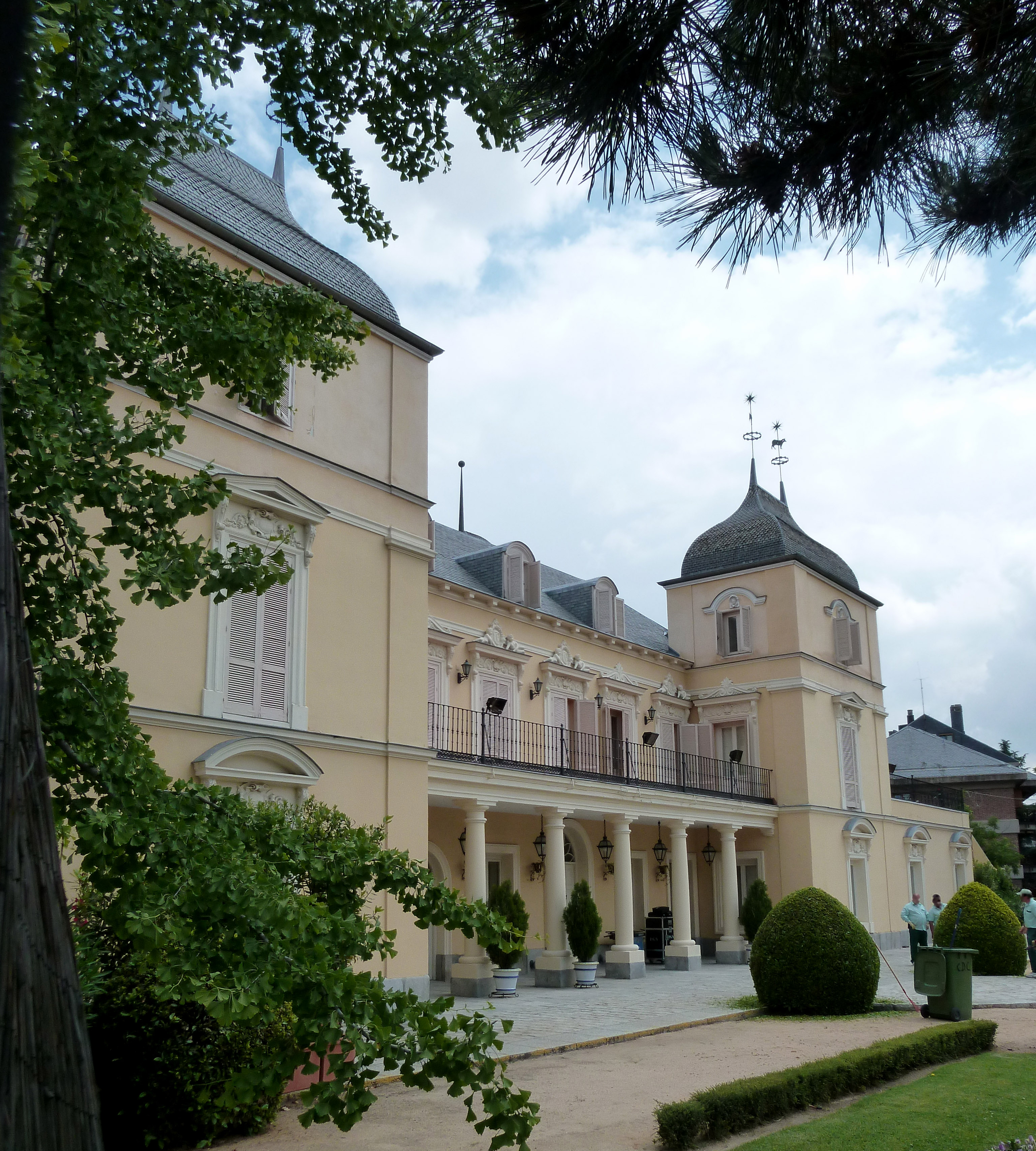

- Location within Spain
- 40.467369°N 3.678806°W
- Location: Madrid, Spain

Spanish Cultural Heritage
- Official name: Palacio de los Duques de Pastrana
- Type: Non-movable
- Criteria: Monument
- Designated: 1979
- Reference no.: RI-51-0004337

The Palace of Duques de Pastrana (Spanish: Palacio de los Duques de Pastrana) is a palace located in Madrid, Spain. It was declared Bien de Interés Cultural in 1979.
