= Little Faith (TV series) =

Spanish television series

- Spanish: Poquita fe
- Created by: Pepón Montero; Juan Maidagán
- Starring: Raúl Cimas; Esperanza Pedreño
- No. of seasons: 1
- No. of episodes: 12

Production
- Running time: c. 15 min
- Production company: Buendía Estudios

Original release
- Network: Movistar Plus+
- Release: 4 July 2023

Little Faith (Spanish: Poquita fe) is a Spanish costumbrista comedy television series created by Pepón Montero and Juan Maidagán which stars Raúl Cimas and Esperanza Pedreño.

== Plot ==
The plot follows the slice-of-life mishaps involving the markedly unambitious couple formed by kindergarten worker Berta and security guard José Ramón.

== Cast ==
- Raúl Cimas as José Ramón
- Esperanza Pedreño as Berta
- Marta Fernández Muro as José Ramón's mother
- Chani Martín as the neighbor
- Julia de Castro as Berta's sister
- María Jesús Hoyos as Berta's mother
- Juan Lombardero as Berta's father
- Pilar Gómez as Pilar
- Enrique Martínez as Riki
- Blas Ortiz
- José Manuel Poga

== Episodes ==
=== Season 1 (2023) ===
No. overall	No. in season	Title	Directed by	Written by	Original release date
1	1	"January" (Enero)"	Pepón Montero	Pepón Montero & Juan Maidagán	4 July 2023
2	2	"February" (Febrero)"	Pepón Montero	Pepón Montero & Juan Maidagán	4 July 2023
3	3	"March" (Marzo)"	Pepón Montero	Pepón Montero & Juan Maidagán	4 July 2023
4	4	"April" (Abril)"	Pepón Montero	Pepón Montero & Juan Maidagán	4 July 2023
5	5	"May" (Mayo)"	Pepón Montero	Pepón Montero & Juan Maidagán	4 July 2023
6	6	"June" (Junio)"	Pepón Montero	Pepón Montero & Juan Maidagán	4 July 2023
7	7	"July" (Julio)"	Pepón Montero	Pepón Montero & Juan Maidagán	4 July 2023
8	8	"August" (Agosto)"	Pepón Montero	Pepón Montero & Juan Maidagán	4 July 2023
9	9	"September" (Septiembre)"	Pepón Montero	Pepón Montero & Juan Maidagán	4 July 2023
10	10	"October" (Octubre)"	Pepón Montero	Pepón Montero & Juan Maidagán	4 July 2023
11	11	"November" (Noviembre)"	Pepón Montero	Pepón Montero & Juan Maidagán	4 July 2023
12	12	"December" (Diciembre)"	Pepón Montero	Pepón Montero & Juan Maidagán	4 July 2023

== Production and release ==
The series is a Buendía Estudios production. It debuted on Movistar Plus+ on 4 July 2023. In September 2023, the renovation of the series for a second season was announced.

== Reception ==
Alberto Rey of El Mundo assessed that the costumbrista comedy television series sublimates the very Spanish me río por no llorar (lit. 'laughing just to keep from crying') aphorism into a work of art.

Raquel Hernández Luján of HobbyConsolas rated the series with 73 points ('good'), praising the "very agile" format and the editing (including the use of the mockumentary), while citing how the series deserved a better closing as a negative point.

== Accolades ==
Year	Award	Category	Nominee(s)	Result	Ref.
2023	29th Forqué Awards	Best Series		Nominated	
2023	29th Forqué Awards	Best Actor in a Series	Raúl Cimas	Nominated	
2023	29th Forqué Awards	Best Actress in a Series	Esperanza Pedreño	Nominated	
2024	11th Feroz Awards	Best Comedy Series		Won	
2024	11th Feroz Awards	Best Screenplay in a Series	Pepón Montero, Juan Maidagán	Nominated	
2024	11th Feroz Awards	Best Main Actor in a Series	Raúl Cimas	Nominated	
2024	11th Feroz Awards	Best Main Actress in a Series	Esperanza Pedreño	Nominated	
2024	11th Feroz Awards	Best Supporting Actor in a Series	Chani Martín	Nominated	
2024	11th Feroz Awards	Best Supporting Actress in a Series	Julia de Castro	Nominated	
2024	32nd Actors and Actresses Union Awards	Best Television Actress in a Secondary Role	Pilar Gómez	Won	
2024	32nd Actors and Actresses Union Awards	Best Television Actor in a Minor Role	Jorge Basanta	Won	
2025	31st Forqué Awards	Best Series		Nominated	
2025	31st Forqué Awards	Best Actress in a Series	Esperanza Pedreño	Won	
2025	31st Forqué Awards	Best Actor in a Series	Raúl Cimas	Nominated	
2026	13th Feroz Awards	Best Comedy Series		Won	
2026	13th Feroz Awards	Best Main Actor in a Series	Raúl Cimas	Nominated	
2026	13th Feroz Awards	Best Main Actress in a Series	Esperanza Pedreño	Won	
2026	13th Feroz Awards	Best Supporting Actress in a Series	Julia de Castro	Won	
2026	13th Feroz Awards	Best Supporting Actress in a Series	María Jesús Hoyos	Nominated	
2026	13th Feroz Awards	Best Screenplay in a Series	Juan Maidagán, Pepón Montero	Nominated	
2026	81st CEC Medals	Best Series		Nominated	
2026	81st CEC Medals	Best Ensemble Cast in a Series		Nominated	
2026	9th ALMA Awards	Best Screenplay in a Comedy Series	Juan Maidagán, Pepón Montero	Won	

== Remakes ==
The series sparked off a German adaptation, Die Stinos, which was released on Joyn in December 2024.
