= In a Whisper (2019 film) =

2019 documentary film

- Film poster
- Spanish: A media voz
- Directed by: Patricia Pérez Fernández; Heidi Hassan
- Release date: November 2019 (IDFA)
- Running time: 80 minutes
- Language: Spanish

In a Whisper (Spanish: A media voz) is a 2019 documentary film directed by Cuban filmmakers Patricia Pérez Fernández and Heidi Hassan.

== Synopsis ==
Hassan and Pérez Fernández have been friends since childhood, a bond that was cemented by a shared love of swimming. As adolescents, they turned their love of cinema into a filmmaking pursuit. Their collaborative relationship was cut short, when Hassan made the decision to leave Cuba for a new life in Europe; eventually settling in Geneva and marrying a fellow Cuban ex-pat. While Pérez Fernández was left reeling by this, she later came to realise she herself could no longer stay in Cuba and relocated to Spain. Her journey was more tumultuous, taking several menial jobs and a failed marriage. Both were obsessed with documenting everything, and In A Whisper pulls these two halves together into a coherent narrative whole.

== Awards ==
- Guadalajara International Film Festival - Feature Length Documentary nominee, Ibero-America Competition (2020)
- Havana Film Festival - Best Documentary Coral Award (2019)
- IDFA - Award for Best Feature-Length Documentary (2019)
