= The Remnants of You =

- Theatrical release poster
- Spanish: Lo que queda de ti
- Directed by: Gala Gracia
- Screenplay by: Gala Gracia
- Produced by: Carlo D'Ursi
- Starring: Laia Manzanares; Ángela Cervantes; Natalia Risueño; Ruy de Carvalho; Anna Tenta
- Cinematography: Michele Paradisi
- Edited by: Julia Juániz
- Music by: Filipe Raposo
- Production companies: Potenza Producciones; Bastian Films; Sajama Films; Garbo Produzioni; Fado Filmes
- Distributed by: Karma Films (es)
- Release dates: 18 March 2025 (Málaga); 16 May 2025 (Spain)
- Countries: Spain; Italy; Portugal
- Language: Spanish

The Remnants of You (Spanish: Lo que queda de ti) is a 2025 drama film written and directed by Gala Gracia. It stars Laia Manzanares and Ángela Cervantes. It is a Spanish, Italian, and Portuguese co-production.

== Plot ==
In the wake of her father's death, jazz pianist Sara returns home in the Aragonese Pyrenees, becoming an eco-friendly livestock farmer and clashing with her sister.

== Cast ==
- Laia Manzanares as Sara
- Ángela Cervantes as Elena
- Ruy de Carvalho
- Anna Tenta
- Ignacio Olivar
- Natalia Risueño

== Production ==
The film is a Spanish, Italian, and Portuguese co-production by Potenza Producciones, Bastian Films, Sajama Films, Garbo Produzioni, and Fado Filmes. Shooting locations in the province of Huesca included Alcampell, Puente de Montañana, Benabarre, Graus, Pilzán, and Capella.

== Reception ==
Alfonso Rivera of Cineuropa assessed that the film "exudes authenticity".

Víctor A. Gómez of La Opinión de Málaga lamented that despite "a commendable and sensitive technical work, a delicate narrative tempo, [and] empathetic and close interpretations", the sequences follow one after the other "without touching or involving" the viewer.

== Release ==
The film was presented at the 28th Málaga Film Festival on 18 March 2025. It also made it to the Meridiana competition of the 16th Bari International Film & TV Festival. It is scheduled to be released theatrically in Spain on 16 May 2025 by Karma Films.

== Accolades ==
Year	Award	Category	Nominee(s)	Result	Ref.
2025	28th Málaga Film Festival	Silver Biznaga for Best Music	Filipe Raposo	Won	
2025	16th Bari International Film & TV Festival	Best Director (Meridiana)	Gala Gracia	Won	

== See also ==
- List of Spanish films of 2025
