= Annie Award for Outstanding Achievement for Editorial in a Feature Production =

Film award category

Annie Award for Editorial in a Feature Production
- Awarded for: Excellence in editing for animated feature productions
- Country: United States
- Presented by: ASIFA-Hollywood
- First award: 2012
- Currently held by: KPop Demon Hunters Editorial Team – KPop Demon Hunters (2025)
- Website: annieawards.org

The Annie Award for Outstanding Achievement for Editorial in a Feature Production is presented annually to recognize excellence in the work of editors and editing teams in animated feature films since the 40th Annie Awards in 2012.

== Winners and nominees ==
=== 2010s ===
Year	Recipient(s)	Film
2012 (40th)
2012 (40th)	Nicholas C. Smith, Robert Grahamjones, David Suther	Brave
2012 (40th)	Catherine Apple	Hotel Transylvania
2012 (40th)	Joyce Arrastia	Rise of the Guardians
2012 (40th)	Mark Rosenbaum	Secret of the Wings
2012 (40th)	Tim Mertens	Wreck-It Ralph
2013 (41st)
2013 (41st)	Greg Snyder, Gregory Amundson, Steve Bloom	Monsters University
2013 (41st)	Fabienne Alvarez-Giro	Ernest & Celestine
2013 (41st)	Jeff Draheim	Frozen
2013 (41st)	Darren Holmes	The Croods
2013 (41st)	James Ryan	Turbo
2014 (42nd)
2014 (42nd)	John K. Carr	How to Train Your Dragon 2
2014 (42nd)	Tim Mertens	Big Hero 6
2014 (42nd)	Dan Molina, Mark Keefer, Karen Hathaway	Planes: Fire & Rescue
2014 (42nd)	Darragh Byrne	Song of the Sea
2014 (42nd)	David Burrows, Todd Hansen, Doug Nicholas, Jonathan Tappin, Courtney O'Brien-Brown	The Lego Movie
2015 (43rd)
2015 (43rd)	Kevin Nolting	Inside Out
2015 (43rd)	Garret Elkins	Anomalisa
2015 (43rd)	Jennifer Dolce, Ernesto Matamoros	Kahlil Gibran's The Prophet
2015 (43rd)	Sim Evan-Jones	Shaun the Sheep Movie
2016 (44th)
2016 (44th)	Christopher Murrie	Kubo and the Two Strings
2016 (44th)	Nazim Meslem	April and the Extraordinary World
2016 (44th)	Jeff Draheim	Moana
2016 (44th)	Kevin Pavlovic	Sausage Party
2016 (44th)	Fabienne Rawley, Jeremy Milton	Zootopia
2017 (45th)
2017 (45th)	Steve Bloom, Lee Unkrich, Greg Snyder, Tim Fox	Coco
2017 (45th)	Harry Hitner, Tim Nordquist	Ferdinand
2017 (45th)	Darragh Byrne	The Breadwinner
2017 (45th)	David Burrows, Matt Villa, John Venzon	The Lego Batman Movie
2017 (45th)	Pamela Ziegenhagen	The Star
2018 (46th)
2018 (46th)	Bob Fisher, Andrew Leviton, Vivek Sharma	Spider-Man: Into the Spider-Verse
2018 (46th)	Chris Cartagena	The Grinch
2018 (46th)	Stephen Schaffer, ACE, Anthony J. Greenberg, Katie Schaefer Bishop	Incredibles 2
2018 (46th)	Jeremy Milton, Fabienne Rawley, Jesse Averna, John Wheeler, Pace Paulsen	Ralph Breaks the Internet
2018 (46th)	Milorad Krstic, Marcell Laszlo, Laszlo Wimmer, Danijel Daka Milosevic	Ruben Brandt, Collector
2019 (47th)
2019 (47th)	Pablo García Revert	Klaus
2019 (47th)	John K. Carr, Mark Hester, Mary Blee	How to Train Your Dragon: The Hidden World
2019 (47th)	Stephen Perkins	Missing Link
2019 (47th)	Tiffany Hillkurtz	The Secret Life of Pets 2
2019 (47th)	Axel Geddes, Torbin Xan Bullock, Greg Snyder	Toy Story 4

=== 2020s ===
Year	Recipient(s)	Film
2020 (48th)
2020 (48th)	Kevin Nolting, Gregory Amundson, Robert Grahamjones, Amera Rizk	Soul
2020 (48th)	Sim Evan-Jones, Adrian Rhodes	A Shaun the Sheep Movie: Farmageddon
2020 (48th)	Benjamin Massoubre	Calamity Jane
2020 (48th)	Catherine Apple, Anna Wolitzky, David Suther	Onward
2020 (48th)	Fiona Toth, Ken Schretzmann	The Willoughbys
2021 (49th)
2021 (49th)	Greg Levitan, Collin Wightman, T.J. Young, Tony Ferdinand, Bret Allen	The Mitchells vs. the Machines
2021 (49th)	Jeremy Milton, John Wheeler, Pace Paulsen, Brian Estrada	Encanto
2021 (49th)	Janus Billeskov Jansen	Flee
2021 (49th)	Catherine Apple, Jason Hudak, Jennifer Jew, Tim Fox, David Suther	Luca
2021 (49th)	Fabienne Rawley, Shannon Stein, Todd Fulkerson, Rick Hammel, Brian Millman	Raya and the Last Dragon
2022 (50th)
2022 (50th)	James Ryan, Jacquelyn Karambelas, Natalla Cronembold, Joe Butler, Katie Parody	Puss in Boots: The Last Wish
2022 (50th)	Tony Greenberg, Katie Bishop, Chloe Kloezeman, Axel Geddes, Tim Fox	Lightyear
2022 (50th)	Nicholas Smith, Steve Bloom, David Suther, Anna Wolitzky, Christopher Zuber	Turning Red
2022 (50th)	Ken Schretzmann, Holly Klein, Emily Chiu, Hamilton Barrett	Guillermo del Toro's Pinocchio
2022 (50th)	Joyce Arrastica, Will Erokan, Vivek Sharma, Michael Hugh O'Donnell, Daniel Ortiz	The Sea Beast
2023 (51st)
2023 (51st)	Spider-Man: Across the Spider-Verse Editorial Team	Spider-Man: Across the Spider-Verse
2023 (51st)	Stephen Schaffer, Amera Rizk, Gregory Snyder, Jen Jew, and Kevin Rose-Williams	Elemental
2023 (51st)	Patrick Voetberg, Joseph Titone, Darrian M. James, Danny Miller, and Brian Robinson	Leo
2023 (51st)	Randy Trager, Erin Crackel, Stephen Schwartz, and Ashley Calle	Nimona
2023 (51st)	Greg Levitan, Illya Quinteros, David and Croomes, and Myra Owyang	Teenage Mutant Ninja Turtles: Mutant Mayhem
2024 (52nd)
2024 (52nd)	Mary Blee, Collin Erker, Orlando Duenas, Lucie Lyon, and Brian Parker	The Wild Robot
2024 (52nd)	Maurissa Horwitz, David Suther, Fiona Toth, and Jonathan Vargo	Inside Out 2
2024 (52nd)	Jeremy Milton and Michael Louis Hill	Moana 2
2024 (52nd)	Bret Marnell, William Max Steinberg, Nik Siefke, Ryan Sommer, and Kaye Speare	Ultraman: Rising
2024 (52nd)	Dan Hembery	Wallace & Gromit: Vengeance Most Fowl
2025 (53rd)
2025 (53rd)	KPop Demon Hunters Editorial Team	KPop Demon Hunters
2025 (53rd)	Nathan Jacquard	Arco
2025 (53rd)	Anna Wolitzky, Steve Bloom, Noah Newman, Greg Snyder, and Ben Morris	Elio
2025 (53rd)	Ludovic Versace	Little Amélie or the Character of Rain
2025 (53rd)	Tomás Pichardo Espaillat	Olivia & the Clouds
