= 28th Málaga Film Festival =

2025 film festival

- Official poster by Javier Díaz Garrido
- Opening film: The Redemption
- Closing film: Mariliendre (TV series)
- Location: Málaga, Spain
- Awards: Golden Biznaga: Deaf and The Dog Thief
- Festival date: 14–23 March 2025

Málaga Film Festival
- 2026 2024

The 28th Málaga Film Festival ran in Málaga, Spain, from 14 to 23 March 2025.

== Background ==
The official poster for the 28th edition (a work by Javier Díaz Garrido) was presented on 22 November 2024. In December 2024, Mercedes Morán was announced as the president of the main competition jury. On 30 January 2025, the festival announced an initial slate of 5 female-directed films for the main competition section. On 14 February 2025, 8 was announced as a non-competitive official selection addition, along with the screenings of the documentary The Sleeper. El Caravaggio perdido and the 4K restoration of the 1975 film Poachers (for its 50th anniversary).

On 25 February 2025, the festival announced that the official selection's jury was to be formed by Morán along with Irene Escolar, Carlos Marqués-Marcet, Daniela Vega, Pilar Palomero, Belén Cuesta, Vetusta Morla member "Pucho", and Estrella Araiza.

The opening gala was hosted by Patricia Montero and featured musical performances by Judeline, La Tania, and Antonio Orozco. The closing gala on 22 March 2025 was hosted by Elena Sánchez and Salva Reina and featured musical performances by María José Llergo and Xoel López.

== Juries ==
The juries consist of the following members:

=== Official competition ===
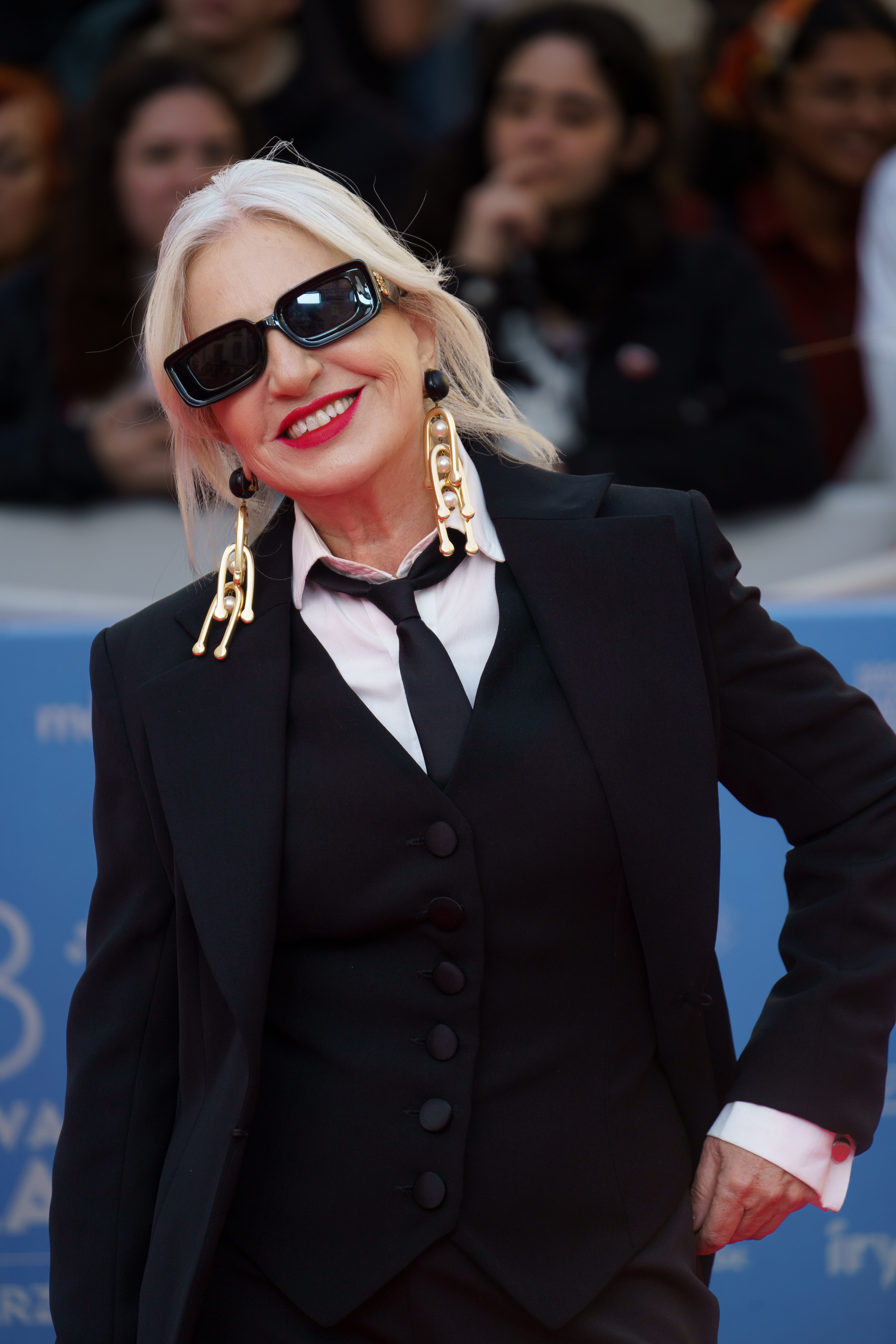
Official jury president Mercedes Morán posing in front of the photographers

- Mercedes Morán (Jury president), actress
- Irene Escolar, actress
- Carlos Marqués-Marcet, director
- Daniela Vega, actress
- Pilar Palomero, director
- Belén Cuesta, actress
- Pucho Martín, singer and cinephile
- Estrella Araiza, director of the Guadalajara International Film Festival

=== Zonazine ===
- Fernando E. Juan Lima
- Pedro Lozano
- Sandra Romero

== Festival slate ==
The festival's film slate is listed as follows:

=== Official Selection ===
==== In competition ====
Highlighted title indicates section's best film winners.

English title	Original title	Director(s)	Production countrie(s)
The Black Land	La terra negra	Alberto Morais	Spain; Panama
Deaf	Sorda	Eva Libertad	Spain
El diablo en el camino		Carlos Armella	Mexico; France
The Dog Thief	El ladrón de perros	Vinko Tomičić Salinas	Bolivia; Chile; Mexico; France; Italy
Dogs	Perros	Gerardo Minutti	Uruguay; Argentina
The Exiles	Los Tortuga	Belén Funes	Spain; Chile
Fury	La furia	Gemma Blasco	Spain
The Good Luck	La buena suerte	Gracia Querejeta	Spain
The Good Manners	La buena letra	Celia Rico Clavellino	Spain
The Heaven of Animals	El cielo de los animales	Santi Amodeo	Spain; Romania
I Never Went To Disney	Nunca fui a Disney	Matilde Tute Vissani	Argentina
Jone, Sometimes	Jone, batzuetan	Sara Fantova	Spain
The Remnants of You	Lo que queda de ti	Gala Gracia	Spain; Portugal; Italy
Away	Molt lluny	Gerard Oms	Spain; Netherlands
No Guilt	Culpa cero	Valeria Bertuccelli, Mora Elizalde	Argentina; Spain
The Portuguese House	Una quinta portuguesa	Avelina Prat	Spain; Portugal
Ravens		Mark Gill	Spain; Japan
The Redemption	La deuda	Daniel Guzmán	Spain; Romania
Beef	Ruido	Ingride Santos	Spain; Mexico
Sugar Island		Johanné Gómez	Dominican Republic; Spain
Everything I Don't Know	Todo lo que no sé	Ana Lambarri	Spain
Violent Butterflies	Violentas mariposas	Adolfo Dávila	Mexico

==== Out of competition ====
English title	Original title	Director(s)	Production countrie(s)
8		Julio Medem	Spain
Aullar		Sergio Siruela	Spain
Barren Land	Tierra de nadie	Albert Pintó	Spain
Breaking Walls	Los aitas	Borja Cobeaga	Spain
Enemies	Enemigos	David Valero	Spain
Pheasant Island	Faisaien Irla	Asier Urbieta	Spain; France
Goat Girl	La niña de la cabra	Ana Asensio	Spain; Romania
Hamburg	Hamburgo	Lino Escalera	Spain; Romania
The House Sitter	El casero	Matias Lucchesi	Argentina; Uruguay
The Cavern Crimes	La huella del mal	Manuel Ríos San Martín	Spain
Lo que quisimos ser		Alejandro Agresti	Argentina; France
Mazel Tov		Adrián Suar	Argentina
Mensaje en una botella		Gabriel Nesci	Argentina
Una muerte silenciosa		Sebastián Schindel	Argentina
One Year and One Day	Un año y un día	Alex San Martín	Spain
Pet Peeves	Pequeños calvarios	Javier Polo	Spain; Mexico
This Too Shall Pass	También esto pasará	Maria Ripoll	Spain; Italy
The Stepmother's Bond	Tras el verano	Yolanda Centeno	Spain
Uno equis dos		Alberto Utrera	Spain
Virgins	Vírgenes	Álvaro Díaz Lorenzo	Spain; Portugal
Wolf Beach	Playa de lobos	Javier Veiga	Spain

=== Zonacine ===
English title	Original title	Director(s)	Production countrie(s)
A nadie le importas		Cristina Galán, David Suárez	Spain
Buenas noches		Matías Szulanski	Argentina
Dies d'estiu de pluja		Col·lectiu Espurnes, Àlex Serra Alcina, Mireia Labazuy Mulero, Clàudia Vila Masvidal	Spain
Join Me for Breakfast	Esmorza amb mi	Iván Morales	Spain
L'impuls nómada		Jordi Esteva	Spain
Llueve sobre Babel		Gala de Sol	Colombia; United States; Spain
Olivia & the Clouds	Olivia y las nubes	Tomás Pichardo Espaillat	Dominican Republic
Un muerto en el pueblo		Mauricio Cuervo Rincón	Colombia

=== Series ===
English title	Original title	Director(s)	Production countrie(s)
Mariliendre		Javier Ferreiro	Spain
La canción		Alejandro Marín	Spain
Perdiendo el juicio		María Togores, Pablo Guerrero, Jaime Olías	Spain
Weiss & Morales		Oriol Ferrer, Lucía Estévez	Spain; Germany

=== Documentaries ===
English title	Original title	Director(s)	Production countrie(s)
The Sleeper. El Caravaggio perdido		Álvaro Longoria	Spain

=== Mosaico: International Scene ===
English title	Original title	Director(s)	Production countrie(s)
Stockholm Bloodbath		Mikael Håfström	Sweden; Denmark
Fuga		Mary Jiménez, Bénédicte Liénard	Belgium; Netherlands; France; Peru
Ghostlight		Kelly O'Sullivan, Alex Thompson	United States
William Tell		Nick Hamm	United Kingdom; Italy; Switzerland
The Ties That Bind Us	L'Attachement	Carine Tardieu	France
La Pie voleuse		Robert Guédiguian	France
The Story of Frank and Nina	La storia del Frank e della Nina	Paola Randi	Italy
Prodigieuses		Frédéric Potier, Valentin Potier	France

== Awards ==
Some of the main awards are listed as follows:

=== Official section feature films ===
==== Official jury prizes ====
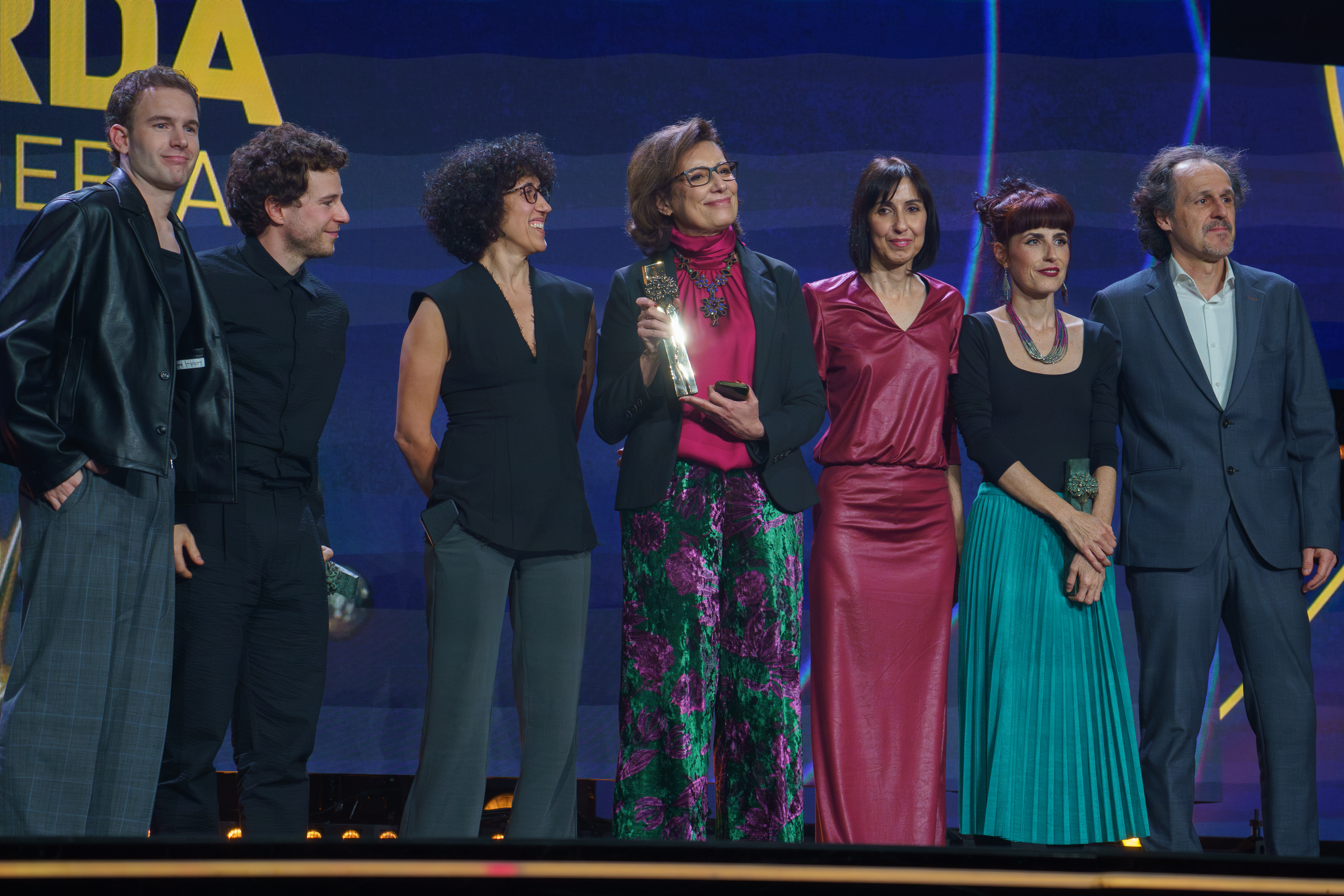
The Deaf team attending the closing gala on 22 March 2025

- Golden Biznaga for Best Spanish Film: Deaf
- Golden Biznaga for Best Latin-American Film: The Dog Thief
- Silver Biznaga, Special Jury Prize: The Exiles
- Silver Biznaga for Best Director: Belén Funes (The Exiles)
  - Special Mention (Director): Celia Rico Clavellino (The Good Manners)
  - Special Mention (Director): Sara Fantova (Jone, Sometimes)
- Silver Biznaga for Best Actress: Ángela Cervantes (Fury) & Miriam Garlo (Deaf)
- Silver Biznaga for Best Actor: Álvaro Cervantes (Deaf) & Mario Casas (Away)
- Silver Biznaga for Best Supporting Actress: María Elena Pérez (Dogs)
- Silver Biznaga for Best Supporting Actor: Àlex Monner (Fury)
- Silver Biznaga for Best Screenplay: Belén Funes and Marçal Cebrian (The Exiles)
- Silver Biznaga for Best Cinematography: Alván Prado (Sugar Island)
- Silver Biznaga for Best Music: Filipe Raposo (The Remnants of You)
- Silver Biznaga for Best Editing: Didac Palou and Tomás López (Fury)

==== Other ====
- Silver Biznaga, Audience Award for Best Film (Competition): Deaf
- Silver Biznaga, Audience Award for Best Film (Out of Competition): 8
- Silver Biznaga, Critics' Jury Special Prize: Away

=== Zinezine ===
==== Jury prizes ====
- Silver Biznaga for Best Spanish Film: Join Me for Breakfast
- Silver Biznaga for Best Latin-American Film: Olivia & the Clouds
- Silver Biznaga for Best Director: Matías Szulanski (Buenas noches)
- Silver Biznaga for Best Actor: Iván Massagué (Join Me for Breakfast)
- Silver Biznaga for Best Actress: Anna Alarcón (Join Me for Breakfast)

==== Other ====
- Silver Biznaga, Audience Award for Best Film: Join Me for Breakfast

=== Mosaico: International Panorama ===
- Silver Biznaga, Audience Award for Best Film: Ghostlight

=== Miscellaneous ===
- SIGNIS Award for Best Film (Official Selection, Competition): The Exiles
- Feroz Puerta Oscura Award for Best Film (Official Selection, Competition): Deaf
