= Laia Manzanares =

Spanish actress (born 1994)

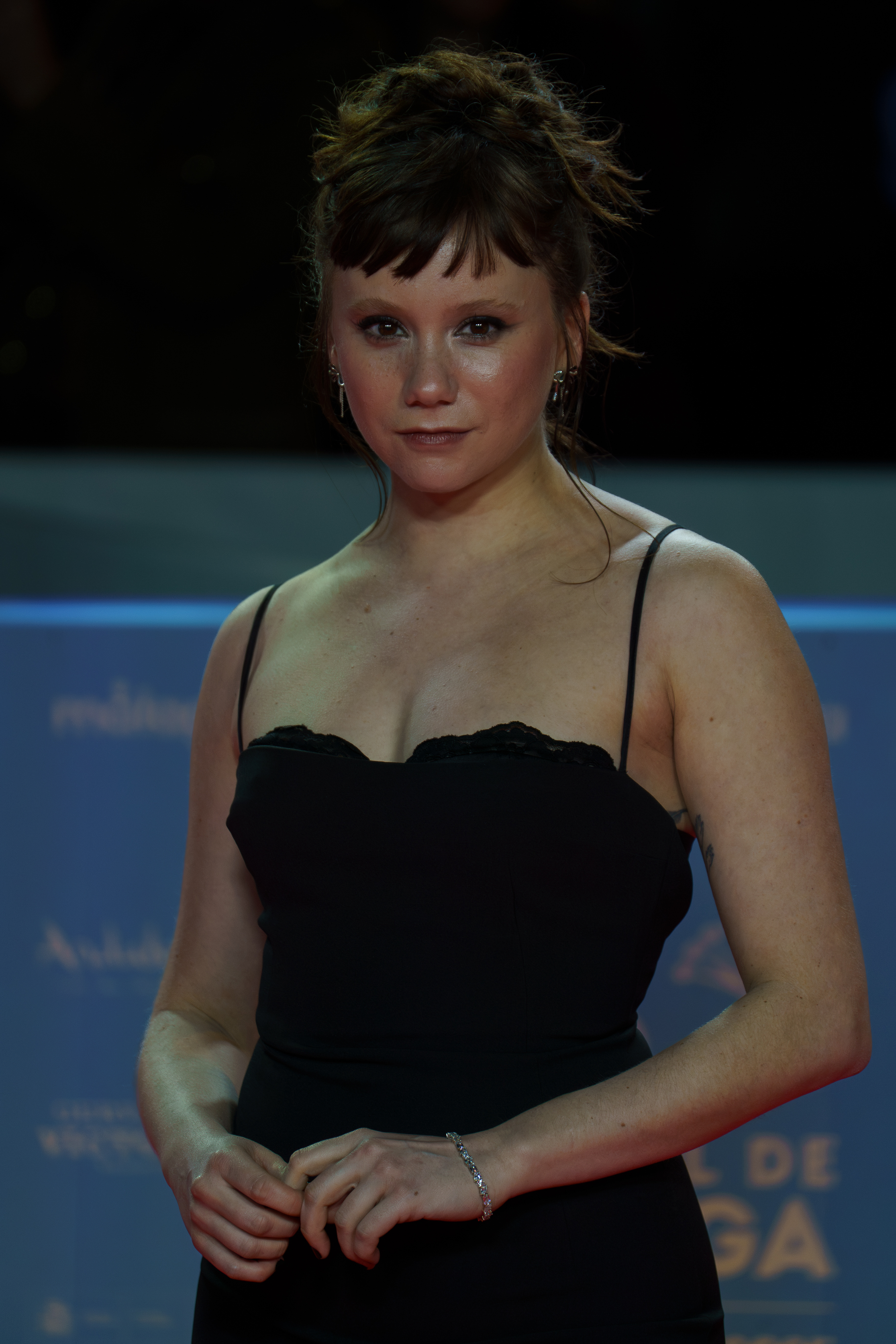
- Manzanares in 2025
- Born: Laia Manzanares Tomàs; 30 March 1994 (age 31); Barcelona, Catalonia, Spain
- Occupation: Actress

Laia Manzanares Tomàs (born 30 March 1994) is a Spanish actress best known for her role as the cheerleader and love interest in Tame Impala's 2015 music video for "The Less I Know the Better", which became a sleeper hit and cult classic in the late 2010s. She is also known for playing the role of Ukrainian student Oksana Casanoves in the Spanish television series Merlí.

== Early life ==
Laia Manzanares Tomàs was born on 30 March 1994 in Barcelona, to a Valencian father and Catalan mother. She was educated at the Institut Públic XXV Olimpiada high school and the Col·legi de Teatre, for two years, in Barcelona.

Manzanares was inspired to act professionally after watching Uma Thurman as Beatrix "The Bride" Kiddo in Quentin Tarantino's Kill Bill: Volume 1 and being impressed by the character's strength of personality. Hoping to inspire others in the same way, Manzanares expressed her hope to work with high school or elementary school students to help instill self confidence in young people going through the "most vulnerable" periods in their lives. Between castings she worked as a waitress and had she not become an actress she would have studied psychology.

== Career ==
In the music video for "The Less I Know the Better", the surrealist Tame Impala music video, she is a cheerleader and the lover of a high school basketball player who is seduced by the gorilla mascot "Trevor".

In television roles she has appeared in series such as Merlí, Cites, El día de mañana, Ray, and Matar al Padre. In theatre roles, she has portrayed Amanda Todd (a Canadian teen who committed suicide due to cyberbullying and revenge pornography) in a dramatization called Amanda T. for TNC's youth theatre.

== Filmography ==
Year	Title	Role	Director	Notes
2016	Waste		Alejo Levis and Laura Sisteró	Short film
2017	Sol creixent	Laia	Guillem Manzanares	Short film
2018	Proyecto tiempo	Eva	Isabel Coixet	Film for Naturgy
2019	La Tierra llamando a Ana	Ana	Fernando Bonelli	Short film with 43 award wins
2021	Alegría	Yael	Violeta Salama	
2023	La desconocida	Carolina		
2025	Lo que queda de ti	Sara		

=== Television ===
Year	Title	Role	Notes
2016	Cites	Laia Farràs	1 episode
2016–2018	Merlí	Oksana Casanoves	27 episodes
2018	Matar al padre	Ruth	1 episode
2018	El día de mañana	Party guest (uncredited)	1 episode
2018	Vilafranca	Eva	Television film
2019	Estoy vivo	Carlota	Limited series
2019	Hache	Sisilia	Netflix series
2022	La noche más larga	Sara	Netflix series
2025	Asuntos internos	Clara Montesinos	La 1 series

=== Theatre ===
Year	Title	Role	Director	Venue
2014	Malnascuts		Txiki Blasi	Sala Beckett
2014	Esquerdes		Txiki Blasi	Nau Ivanow
2016–2017	Odisseus		Quimet Pla y Oriol Pla	Sala Beckett
2018	Temps salvatge	Ivana	Josep Maria Miró	Teatre Nacional de Catalunya
2019	Amanda T	Amanda Todd	Àlex Mañas	Teatre Nacional de Catalunya

== Awards ==
=== Fugaz Awards ===
Year	Category	Short film	Result
2019	Best Actress	La Tierra llamando a Ana	Won

=== International Film Festival of Wales ===
Year	Category	Short film	Result
2020	Best Actress	La Tierra llamando a Ana	Won
