= Aler (Benabarre) =

- Locality
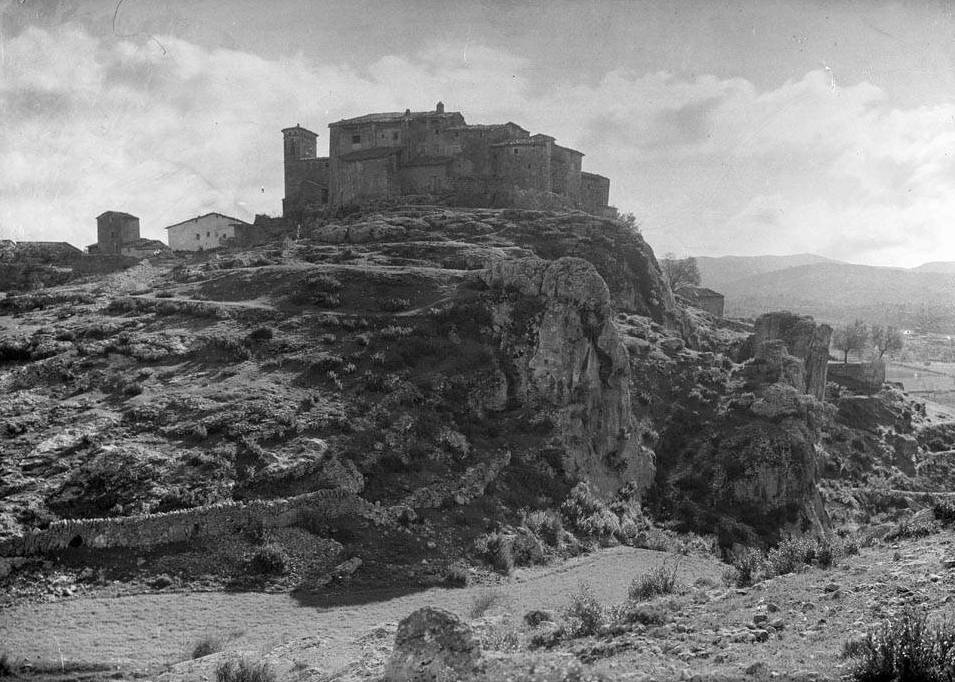

- Location within Aragon Location within Spain
- Coordinates: 42°6′45″N 0°25′33″E
- Country: Spain
- Autonomous community: Aragon
- Province: Province of Huesca
- Municipality: Benabarre
- Elevation: 679 m (2,228 ft)

Population
  - Total: 39

Aler is a locality located in the municipality of Benabarre, in Huesca province, Aragon, Spain. As of 2020, it has a population of 39.

== Geography ==
Aler is located 89km east of Huesca.
