= Asuntos internos =

2025 Spanish television series

- Promotional release poster
- Genre: Police thriller; Historical drama
- Created by: Pedro García Ríos; Rodrigo Martín Antoranz
- Written by: Pedro García Ríos; Rodrigo Martín Antoranz; Joana M. Ortueta; Paula Sánchez
- Directed by: María Togores; Samantha López Speranza
- Starring: Laia Manzanares; Silvia Abascal; Nacho Fresneda; Luis Callejo; Carla Campra; Marta Poveda
- Music by: Juanjo Javierre
- Country of origin: Spain
- Original language: Spanish

Production
- Producers: Francisco Pou; Gustavo Ferrada
- Cinematography: Curro Ferreira
- Production companies: RTVE; Mediacrest; Mediacrest El Clásico AIE

Original release
- Network: La 1
- Release: 12 February – 12 March 2025

Asuntos internos is a Spanish police thriller television series created by Pedro García Ríos and Rodrigo Martín Antoranz. The cast is led by Laia Manzanares.

== Plot ==
Set in 1979 in a police station of Vallecas against the backdrop of the onset of the heroin epidemics, the plot follows Clara Montesinos, a member of the first promotion of female police agents.

== Cast ==
- Laia Manzanares as Clara Montesinos
- Silvia Abascal as Ana Villacastín
- Nacho Fresneda as Urbieta
- Luis Callejo as Romero
- Carla Campra as Gema
- Marta Poveda as Berta
- Nico Romero as Flores
- César Vicente as Mario
- Javier Collado as Pepe
- Jorge de Juan as Calderón
- Josema Pichardo as Olmo
- Josean Bengoetxea as Rufo
- Simón Ramos as Dimas
- Manuela Vellés as Reme
- Miki Esparbé as Velarde

== Production ==
Formerly known under the working title of Demokracia and created by Pedro García Ríos and Rodrigo Martín Antoranz, the series is a RTVE, Mediacrest, and Mediacrest El Clásico AIE production. Shooting locations included Vallecas and Carabanchel.

== Release ==
The series receive a pre-screening at the Cádiz-based South International Series Festival in October 2024. It will debut on La 1 on 12 February 2025. The original broadcast run wrapped on 12 March 2025.

== See also ==
- 2025 in Spanish television
