= Tolva =

Municipality in the province of Huesca, Spain

Coordinates: 42°07′N 0°34′E

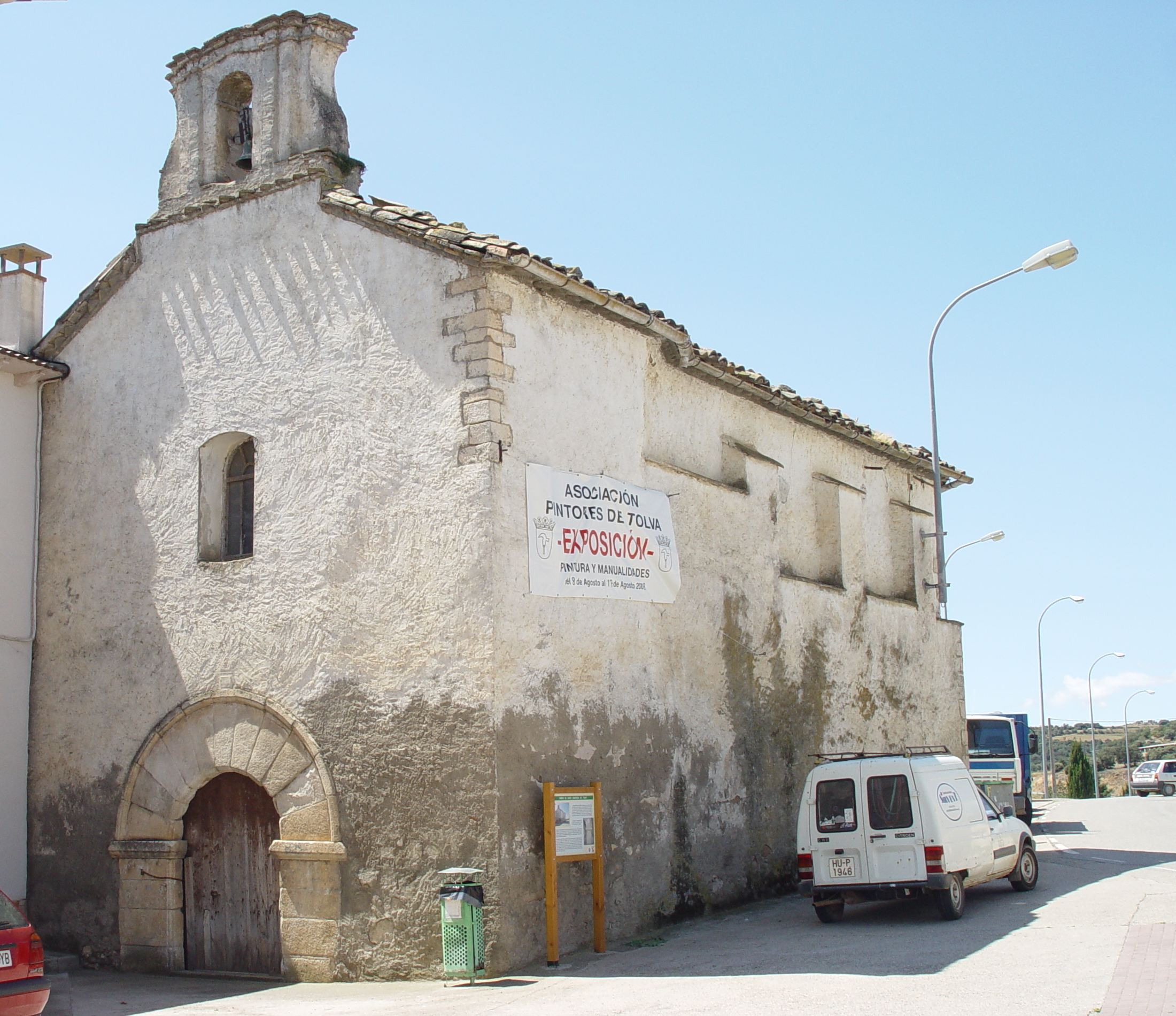
Hermitage of Santa Anastasia in Tolba

Tolva's flag

Tolva's coat of arms

Tolva (Spanish: [ˈtolβa]), in Catalan: Tolba ([ˈtolβa]) is a town and municipality in the province of Huesca, in Aragon, Spain. It is located 696 metres above sea level in the north-eastern part of Huesca, in the comarca of Ribagorza.

The municipality is composed of several villages: Luzás (Lluçars), Sagarras Bajas (Sagarres Baixes) and La Almunia de San Lorenzo (L'Almúnia de Sant Llorenç).

== See also ==
- List of municipalities in Huesca
