= Purroy de la Solana =

- Locality
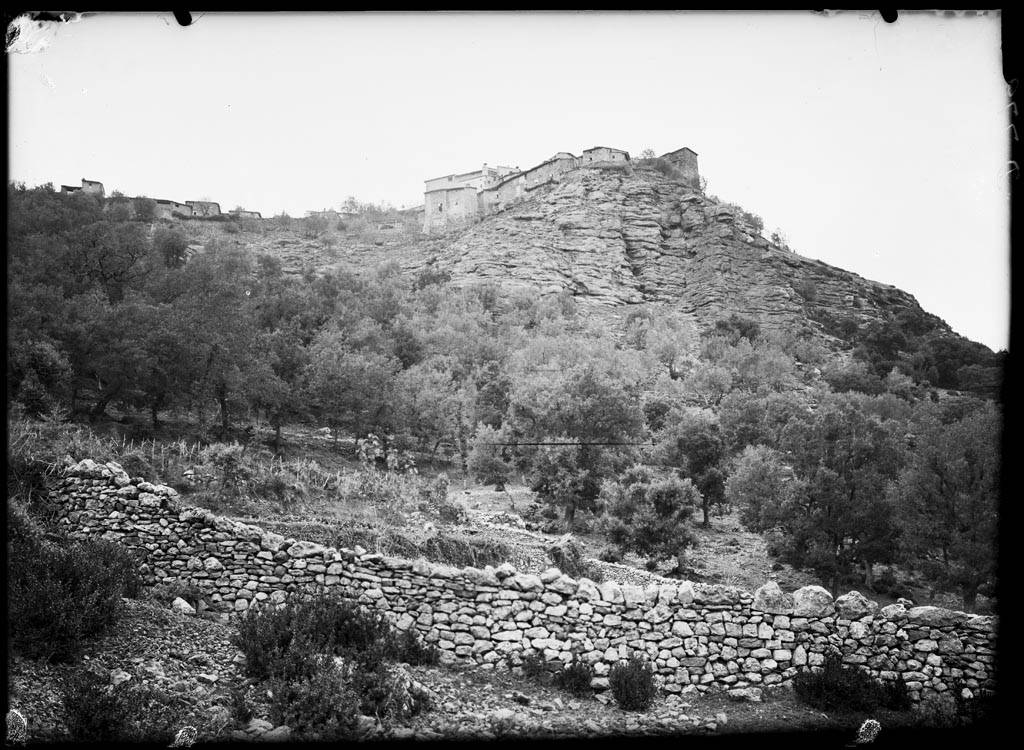

- Location within Aragon Location within Spain
- Coordinates: 42°3′27″N 0°27′40″E
- Country: Spain
- Autonomous community: Aragon
- Province: Province of Huesca
- Municipality: Benabarre
- Elevation: 857 m (2,812 ft)

Population
  - Total: 46

Purroy de la Solana is a locality located in the municipality of Benabarre, in Huesca province, Aragon, Spain. As of 2020, it has a population of 46.

== Geography ==
Purroy de la Solana is located 104km east of Huesca.
