= Girl Unknown =

- Theatrical release poster
- Spanish: La desconocida
- Directed by: Pablo Maqueda
- Screenplay by: Pablo Maqueda; Paco Bezerra; Haizea G. Viana
- Based on: Grooming by Paco Bezerra
- Starring: Laia Manzanares; Manolo Solo; Eva Llorach
- Cinematography: Santiago Racaj
- Edited by: Marta Velasco
- Production companies: Fórmula Cine AIE; Elamedia
- Distributed by: Filmax
- Release dates: 17 March 2023 (Málaga); 9 June 2023 (Spain)
- Country: Spain
- Language: Spanish

Girl Unknown (Spanish: La desconocida) is a 2023 Spanish thriller film directed by Pablo Maqueda which stars Laia Manzanares and Manolo Solo alongside Eva Llorach. It is an adaptation of Paco Bezerra's stage play Grooming.

== Plot ==
The film unfolds a pendulum swinging power dynamic between the seemingly innocent Carolina, and a guy she meets in a park named Leo. What begins and is a case of grooming morphs into something far more complex due to Carolina not being all she seems.

== Cast ==
- Laia Manzanares as Carolina
- Manolo Solo as Leo
- Eva Llorach as Elisa
- Blanca Parés as Nina
- Vega Céspedes as Anita

== Production ==
An adaptation of stage play Grooming by Paco Bezerra, the screenplay was penned by Pablo Maqueda, Paco Bezerra, and Haizea G. Viana. The film was produced by Elamedia and Fórmula Cine AIE with support from ICAA, the Madrid regional administration, Ayuntamiento de Madrid, Castilla–La Mancha's Fundación IMPULSA and ECAM, and participation of Telemadrid and CMM TV. Filming locations included Madrid and Albacete. Shooting lasted from October to November 2021.

== Release ==
The film was presented in the official selection of the 26th Málaga Film Festival on 17 March 2023. Distributed by Filmax, it was released theatrically in Spain on 9 June 2023, with a later streaming release on Filmin set for 20 October 2023.

== Reception ==
According to the review aggregation website Rotten Tomatoes, Girl Unknown has a 100% approval rating based on 5 reviews from critics, with an average rating of 7.50/10.

Andrea G. Bermejo of Cinemanía billed the film as the "most perverse" of Málaga's official selection, hailing Solo's performance as a sexual predator as his best ever. Also reviewing for Cinemanía, Rubén Romero Santos rated the film 4 out of 5 stars, otherwise deeming it to constitute, together with Carlos Vermut's Manticore, a magnificent double feature on paederasty.

Víctor A. Gómez of La Opinión de Málaga assessed that the film is "too much enamored of the purported psychological murkiness of its story and its protagonists", and it fails to meet the hype.

Pablo Vázquez of Fotogramas rated the film 4 out of 5 stars, praising "its almost Mephistophelian formulation".

Raquel Hernández Luján of HobbyConsolas rated the film with 58 points ('so so'), writing that it "has better intentions than final results", praising Solo and Manzanares while pointing out that the film "exposes its cards too soon and has plot holes".

== See also ==
- List of Spanish films of 2023
