= La Almunia de San Lorenzo =

- Locality
- Almunia de San Lorenzo
- Location within Aragon Location within Spain
- Coordinates: 42°10′5″N 0°36′9″E
- Country: Spain
- Autonomous community: Aragon
- Province: Province of Huesca
- Municipality: Tolva
- Elevation: 850 m (2,790 ft)

Population
  - Total: 1

La Almunia de San Lorenzo or Almunia de San Lorenzo is a locality located in the municipality of Tolva, in Huesca province, Aragon, Spain. As of 2020, it has a population of 1.

== Geography ==
La Almunia de San Lorenzo is located 110km east of Huesca.
