= Estaña =

- Locality
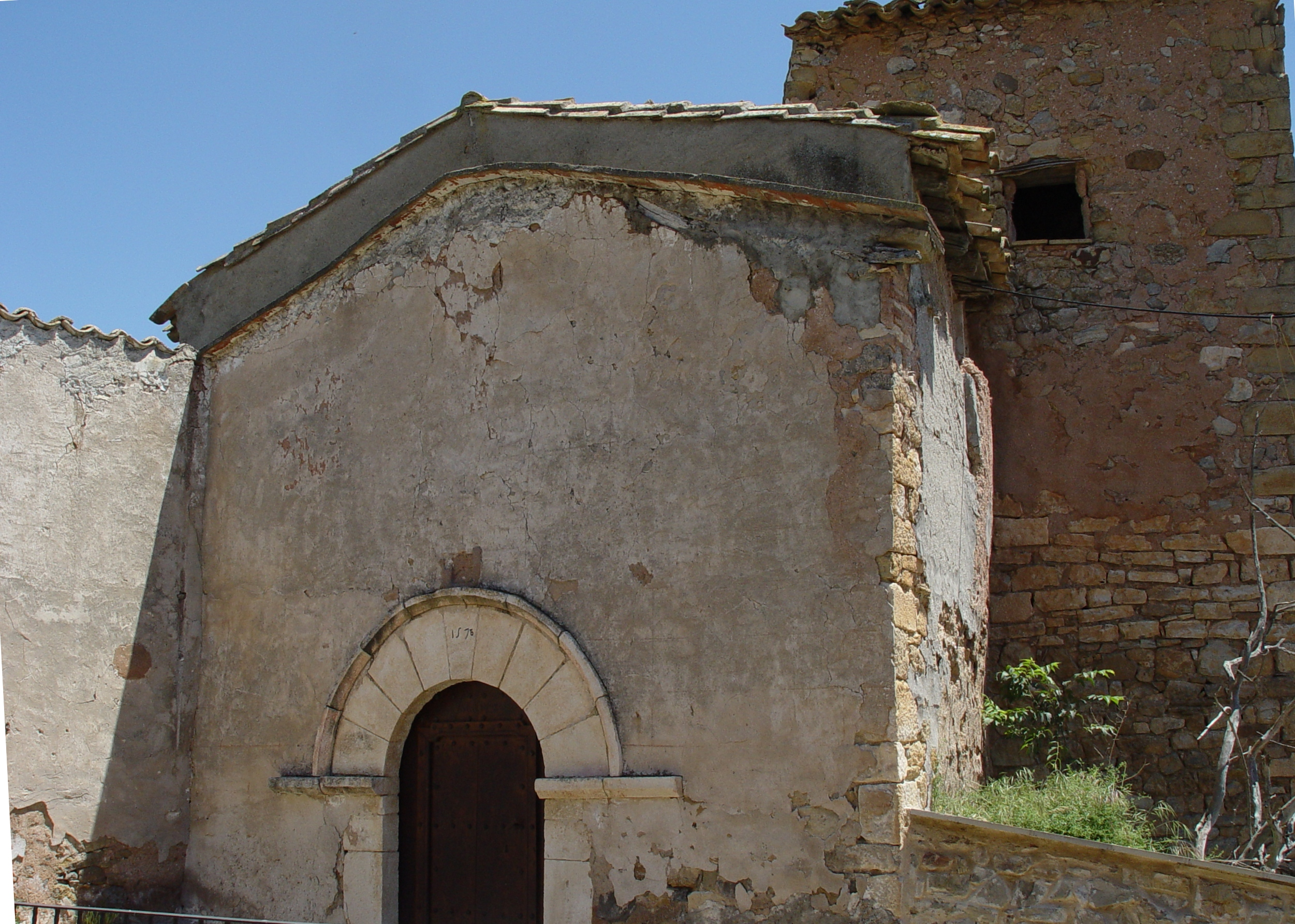

- Location within Aragon Location within Spain
- Coordinates: 42°1′56″N 0°31′8″E
- Country: Spain
- Autonomous community: Aragon
- Province: Province of Huesca
- Municipality: Benabarre
- Elevation: 719 m (2,359 ft)

Population
  - Total: 7

Estaña is a locality located in the municipality of Benabarre, in Huesca province, Aragon, Spain. As of 2020, it has a population of 7.

== Geography ==
Estaña is located 116km east of Huesca.
