= The Redemption (2025 film) =

- Theatrical release poster
- Spanish: La deuda
- Directed by: Daniel Guzmán
- Produced by: Daniel Guzmán; Pedro Hernández Santos
- Starring: Daniel Guzmán; Itziar Ituño; Susana Abaitua; Rosario García; Luis Tosar; Mona Martínez; Francesc Garrido
- Cinematography: Ibon Antuñano Totorika
- Edited by: Nacho Ruiz Capillas; Pablo Marchetto
- Music by: Richard Skelton
- Production companies: La Deuda AIE; El Niño Producciones; Aquí y Allí Films; La Mirada Oblicua; Avanpost Media
- Distributed by: Wanda Visión
- Release dates: 14 March 2025 (Málaga); 17 October 2025 (Spain)
- Running time: 109 minutes
- Countries: Spain; Romania
- Language: Spanish

The Redemption (Spanish: La deuda, lit. 'the debt') is a 2025 social thriller drama film directed by Daniel Guzmán, who also stars alongside Itziar Ituño, Susana Abaitua, and Rosario García.

== Plot ==
47-year-old Lucas and elder woman Antonia co-live in a city apartment in Madrid, but gentrification forces them out. As Lucas looks for money desperately, he commits a grave mistake, upending their lives.

== Cast ==
- Daniel Guzmán as Lucas
- Itziar Ituño as Gabriela
- Susana Abaitua as Mara
- Rosario García as Antonia
- Luis Tosar as Jero
- Mona Martínez as Sorina
- Francesc Garrido as Sebas
- Fernando Valdivielso as Choru

== Production ==
The film is a Spanish-Romanian co-production by La Deuda AIE, El Niño Producciones, Aquí y Allí Films, and La Mirada Oblicua alongside Avanpost. It had the participation of RTVE, Movistar Plus+, Canal Sur, and Telemadrid. It was shot on location in the centre of Madrid.

== Release ==
The film premiered as the opening film of the 28th Málaga Film Festival on 14 March 2025. It also received a screening at the 8th Almagro International Film Festival on 3 August 2025 and as the closing film of the 30th Ourense Film Festival on 4 October 2025.

Distributed by Wanda Visión, it is scheduled to be released theatrically in Spain on 17 October 2025.

== Reception ==
Víctor A. Gómez of La Opinión de Málaga assessed that The Redemption could lowkey be an edulcorated version of recent thrillers by the Safdie brothers but, unlike Good Time (2017) or Uncut Gems (2019), it "goes round in circles too much and ends up being quite repetitive, even tiresome".

== See also ==
- List of Spanish films of 2025
