= Benabarre =

Benabarre (Spanish) Benavarri (Ribagorçan) Benavarri (Aragonese)
- Municipality
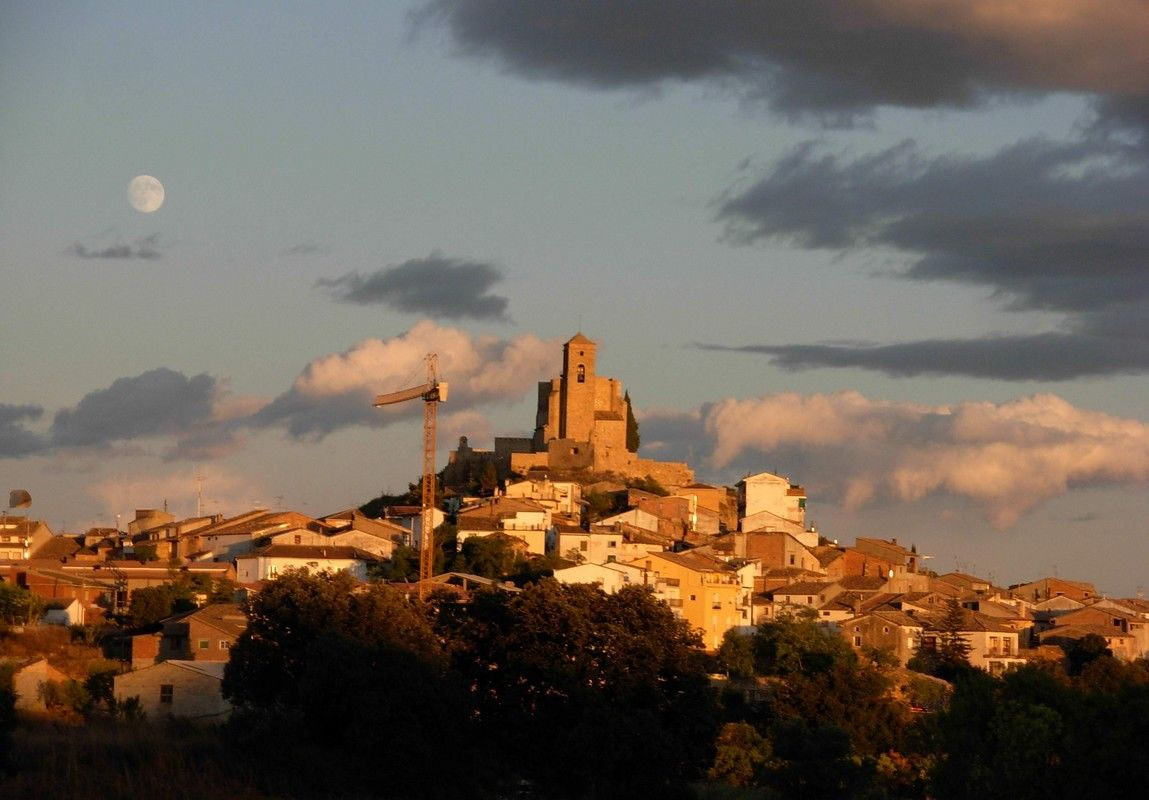

- Flag Coat of arms

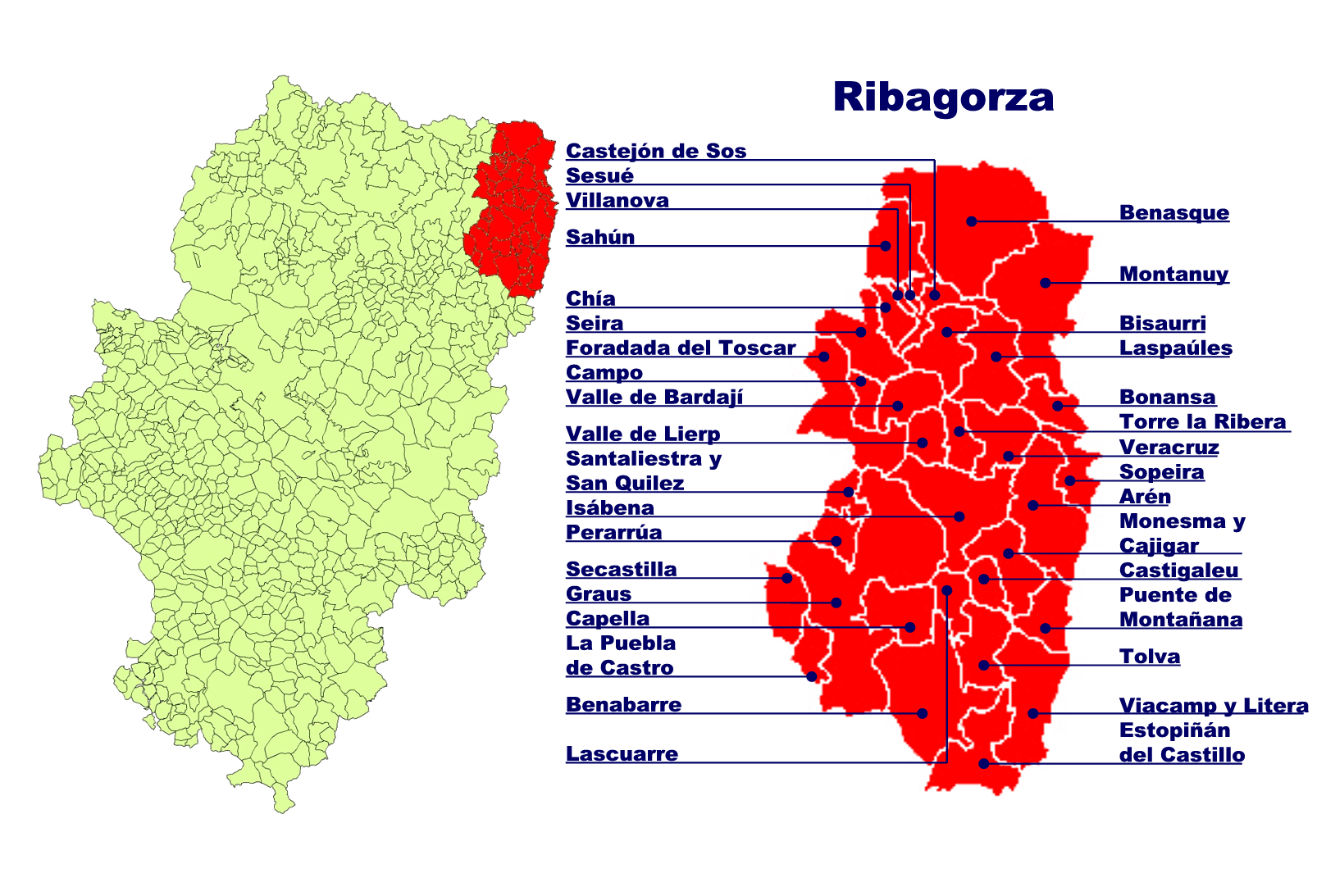

- Location of Benabarre/Benavarri within Aragon Location of Benabarre/Benavarri within Spain
- Coordinates: 42°7′0″N 0°29′0″E
- Country: Spain
- Autonomous community: Aragon
- Province: Huesca
- Comarca: Ribagorza
- Judicial district: Barbastro

Government
  - Alcalde: Alfredo Sancho Guardia (2007) (PSOE)

Area
  - Total: 157.14 km^{2} (60.67 sq mi)
- Elevation: 788 m (2,585 ft)

Population (2025-01-01)
  - Total: 1,142
  - Density: 7.267/km^{2} (18.82/sq mi)
- Demonym: Benabarrense
- Time zone: UTC+1 (CET)
  - Summer (DST): UTC+2 (CEST)
- Postal code: 22580
- Website: Official website

Benabarre (Spanish: [benaˈβare]), in Ribagorçan and Aragonese: Benavarri (locally [benaˈβari]) is a town and municipality in the Aragonese comarca of Ribagorza, in the province of Huesca, Spain.

Benabarre is the historical and cultural capital of the comarca. It is part of the geo-linguistic area of La Franja, where Ribagorçan dialect of Catalan is spoken. In ancient texts it appears as Benabarri.

It is located in the Pre-Pyrenees, 90 km from Huesca and 65 km from Lleida, at an altitud of 792 m, in a small syncline between Ésera and Cajigar rivers. Most of the territory, however, belongs to the Noguera Ribagorçana basin. To the north we find the Castillo de Laguarres mountain range, and to the south we find the Montsec Range. Through its municipal area runs the N-230 road, that connects Lleida and the Val d'Aran.

== History ==
It is a very old town, probably the Roman "Bargidum" or "Bargusia", and it is said that it was given to the Arabs taking the name of their first lord Aben Avarre. It was conquered from Islam around the year 1062 (although there is no document proving the exact date). What leaves no doubt is that it was conquered by Ramiro I of Aragon for the Kingdom of Aragon within the same military campaign in which he conquered, immediately north of the town, the places of Luzás, Viacamp y Litera, Tolva, Laguarres and Lascuarre, and to the south of the town, but north of Purroy and Caserras, the lands of Falces, Falcibus, from one of whose houses and its alloys, the king granted a franchise to Agila de Falces and brothers on February 1, 1067 (as documented on that date).

Traditionally, Benabarre was the capital of the historic County of Ribagorza, which was more expansive in territory than today, and included the comarca of Alta Ribagorça, now in the province of Lleida, Catalonia. It was during the Spanish War of Independence, from 1808 to 1814, that the French Napoleonic troops, in retaliation against the inhabitants of Benabarre, decided to make Graus the capital of the comarca. Ever since, Benabarre ceased to be the administrative capital, but it is still the most important cultural and historical center of the region. During the First Carlist War (1833–1840) it was one of the towns that suffered the most from those in the province of Huesca.

== Administration ==
=== List of the last mayors of Benabarre ===
Period	Mayor	Party
1979–1981	Bienvenido Luis Almuzada Tarroc	Ind.
1981–1983	José Antonio Ballarín Pociello	Ind.
1983–1987	Manuel Jaraiz Canfranc	PSOE
1987–1991	Manuel Jaraiz Canfranc	PSOE
1991–1995	Manuel Jaraiz Canfranc	PSOE
1995–1999	Manuel Jaraiz Canfranc	PSOE
1999–2003	Manuel Jaraiz Canfranc	PAR
2003–2007	Alfredo Sancho Guardia	PSOE
2007–2011	Alfredo Sancho Guardia	PSOE
2011–2015	Alfredo Sancho Guardia	PSOE
2015–2019	Alfredo Sancho Guardia	PSOE
2019–	Alfredo Sancho Guardia	PSOE

=== Electoral results ===
Local elections
Party	2003	2007	2011	2015	2019
PSOE	3	6	5	4	6
PP	–	2	3	4	3
Aragón Sí Puede				1	–
PAR	3	–		–	
CHA	3	1	1		
CDF			–		
Total	9	9	9	9	9

== Geography ==
=== Population centers of the municipality ===
- Aler. Term added to Benabarre before 1930. Located at 669 meters of altitude and in the basin of the Ésera river. To the northwest of the place is the hermitage of Nuestra Señora de las Ventosas.
- Entença. Located on the left bank of the Cajigar river. It belongs to Benabarre since 1974. The castle of the town was the origin of the Entença Barony.
- Benabarre (capital of the municipality). (Its streets maintain a medieval structure). Located 1 km to the north is the old Dominican Monastery of Our Lady of Linares.
- Caladrones. It is located on a hill on the left bank of the Río Guart. From the old Castle of Caladrones only the tower remains. In 1974, the municipal term of Caladrones along with its towns: Caladrones, Ciscar and Entença, was annexed to the one of Benabarre.
- Castilló del Pla. Located at the foot of the Corrodella range, at 762 meters of altitude. Previously it was part of the municipality of Pilzán.
- Ciscar. Located at 591 meters of altitude on the right bank of the Cajigar river.
- Estaña. It is located at 716 meters of altitude in the mountains that separate the Guart River and the waters of "La Sosa" (Cinca river).
- Pilzán. At 905 meters of altitude above sea level. Until 1972 it was an independent municipality. The population entities that included the term were: Estaña, Castilló del Pla, the depopulated of Penavera i Cabestany, and la quadra d'Andolfa.
- Purroy de la Solana. Located above the ravine "El Molí". Independent term until 1974. The municipality included the hermitage of Nuestra Señora del Pla.

== Local festivities ==
- June 8, Saint Medard: patron festivities.
  - The most remarkable act is the pastorada between the master and the ramadá (shepherd), and the typical dance El ball dels palitrocs. It is also held the Baixada de Carricotxes, a float ornament contest.
- August
  - Ball dels Salvatges: Recently recovered representation. It is a type of theater with a series of dances starring men of different social status, whose purpose is to conquer a lady. Since 2010 it is a biennial representation.
  - The summer carnival is held on the third weekend of August.

The Holy Week procession is also well known in the Ribagorza, and begins on Holy Friday at 10 pm from the Our Lady of Valdeflores church square.

== Patrimony ==
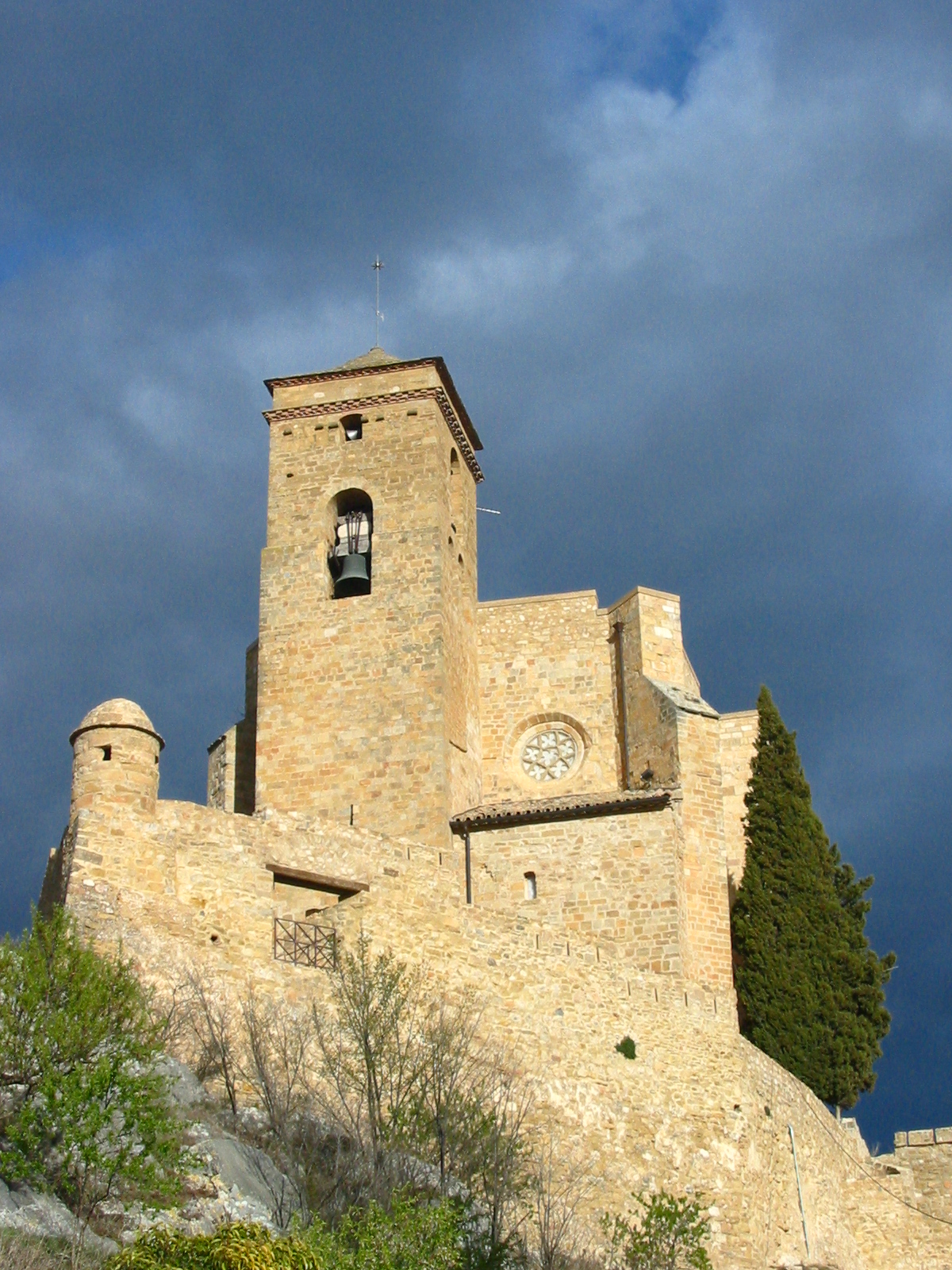
Castillo de Benabarre.

- The Castle of the Counts of Ribagorça, from the X-XI centuries.
- 19th century parish church.
- Medieval historical center.
- Hermitage of Saint Medard.
- Flour mill.
- Ice well.
- 1932 oil mill.
- 13th century public laundry

Also noticeable are the Hermitage of Santa Maria of Caladrones and the Hermitage of San Salvador of Entença, as well as churches of Saint Romanus of Estaña, Saint Stephen of Estaña, Saint James of Entença, Saint Anne of Caladrones, Santa María of Aler, Saint Cristopher of Ciscar and Saint Michael of Ciscar.

== Illustrious Benabarrenses ==
- Juan II de Ribagorza (or Juan de Aragón): count of Ribagorza, lieutenant of Catalonia and viceroy of Naples (1457–1528)
- Pedro García de Benavarre: Gothic painter (15th century)
- Juan Bayarte Calasanz y Ávalos: Governor of Menorca and Ibiza in the 17th century
- Jaume Santiveri i Piniés: businessman, founder of Santiveri

== Twinned towns ==
- France, Aurignac.

== See also ==
- List of municipalities in Huesca
