= Avelina Prat =

Spanish filmmaker

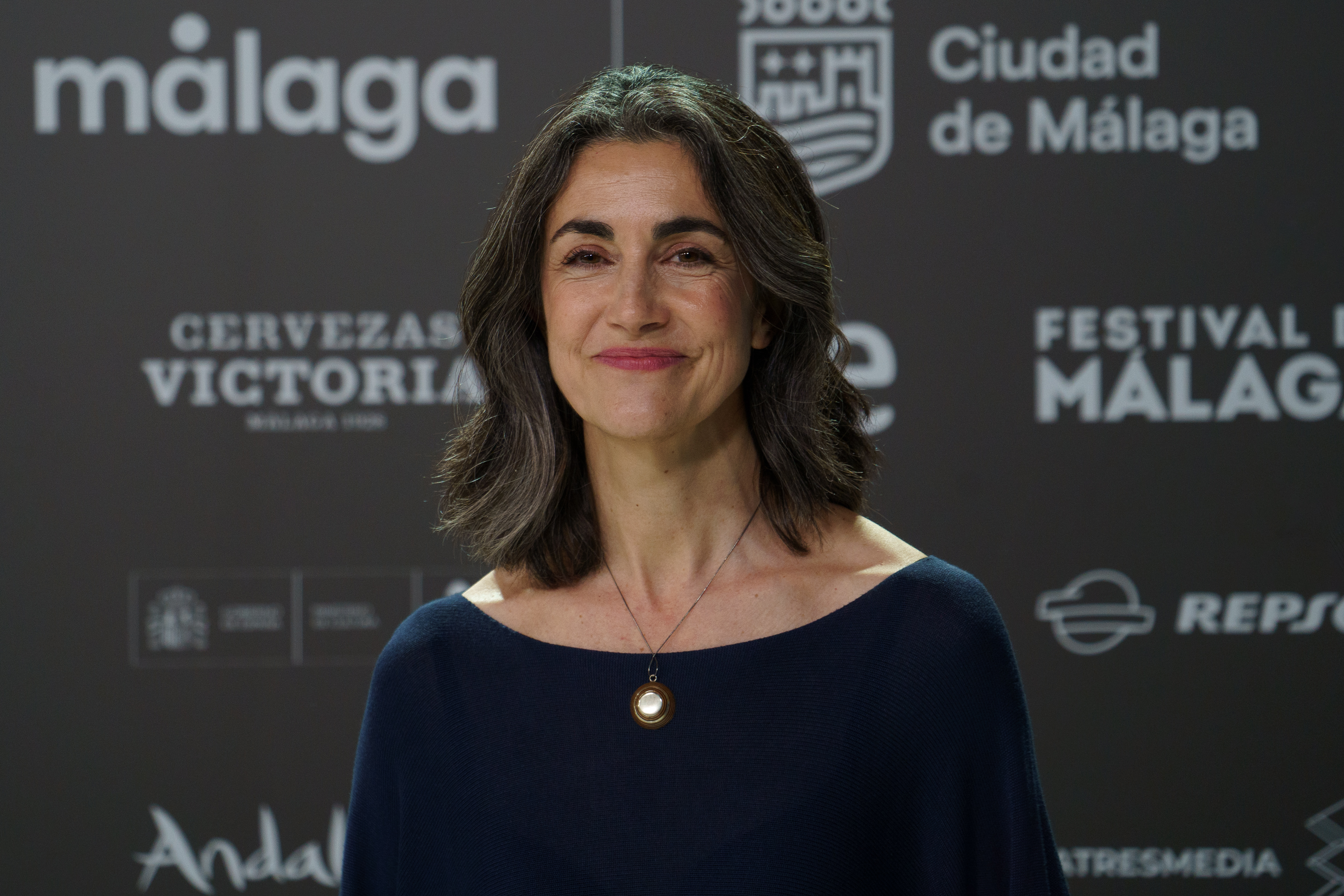
- Prat in 2025
- Born: 1972 (age 52–53); Valencia, Spain
- Occupations: Film director; screenwriter; script supervisor; architect

Avelina Prat (born 1972) is a Spanish filmmaker and script supervisor.

== Life and career ==
Prat was born in Valencia in 1972. Prior to entering the film industry, she worked as an architect. Starting in 2004, she worked as script supervisor for over 30 feature films, including The Queen of Spain, in which she also featured as an actress portraying a script supervisor. She also directed the short films 208 palabras and 3/105 (2014 Venice Film Festival entry).

Her feature film directorial debut, Vasil, premiered at the 2022 Seminci. It was followed by The Portuguese House (2025), which premiered at the 28th Málaga Film Festival.

== Accolades ==
Year	Award	Category	Work	Result	Ref.
2022	5th Berlanga Awards	Best Director	Vasil	Won	
2022	5th Berlanga Awards	Best Screenplay	Vasil	Won	
2023	15th Gaudí Awards	Best New Director	Vasil	Nominated	
