= Olivia & the Clouds =

2024 animated film

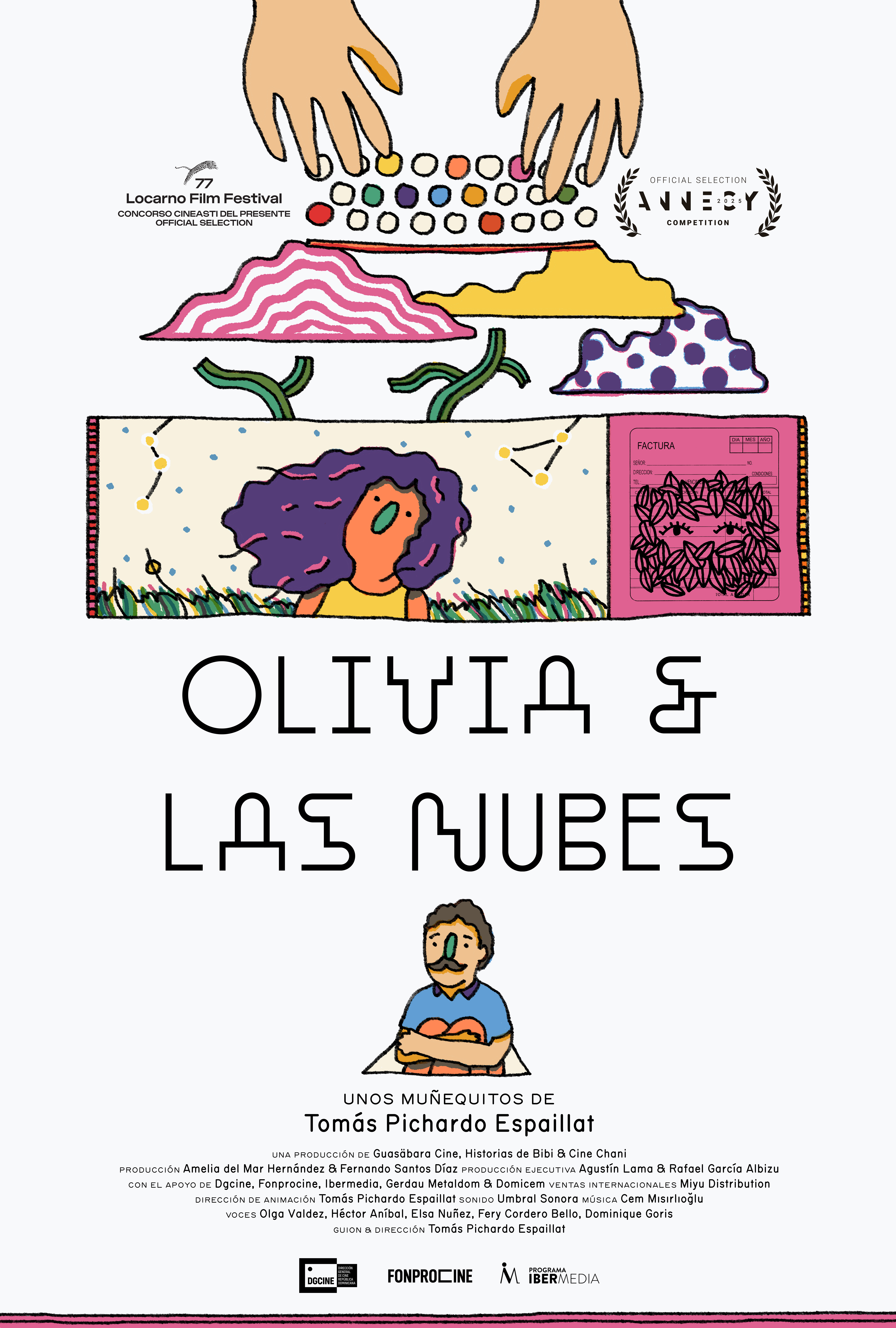
- Promotional release poster
- Spanish: Olivia & Las Nubes
- Directed by: Tomás Pichardo Espaillat
- Screenplay by: Tomás Pichardo Espaillat
- Produced by: Amelia del Mar Hernández González; Fernando Santos Díaz
- Starring: Olga Valdez; Héctor Aníbal; Elsa Núñez; Fery Cordero Bello; Dominique Goris
- Cinematography: Jeremy García
- Music by: Cem Misirlioğlu
- Production companies: Guasábara Cine; Historias de Bibi; Cine Chani
- Distributed by: Miyu Distribution
- Release dates: 15 August 2024 (Locarno); 19 June 2025 (Dominican Republic)
- Running time: 81 minutes
- Country: Dominican Republic
- Language: Spanish

Olivia & the Clouds (Spanish: Olivia & Las Nubes) is a 2024 Dominican adult animated experimental drama film written and directed by Tomás Pichardo Espaillat in his feature directorial debut.

The film had its world premiere at the 77th Locarno Film Festival on 15 August 2024.

== Summary ==
Olivia and The Clouds explores love's complexities through the Rashomon effect. Olivia, haunted by a past love, hides it under her bed. She trades flowers with this ghost in exchange for comforting rain clouds.

== Voice cast ==
- Olga Valdez as Olivia
- Héctor Aníbal as Ramón
- Elsa Núñez as Doña Olivia
- Fery Cordero Bello as Mauricio
- Dominique Goris as Barbara
- Fidia Peralta as Yudelkis
- Lill Taveras as Laura
- Rebecca Dalmasí as Graciela
- Cesar Calcagno as Arturo
- Ricardo Ariel Toribio as Vendedor de flores / Marinero

== Production ==
In an interview with Loud and Clear, Pichardo Espaillat revealed that the production of the film began ten years prior. Different animators contributed different animation techniques to the film. "The film has these different points of views and characters, so I could play around with that idea in the visuals. All these people could bring their own styles and ways of working," he explained.

== Release ==
Olivia & the Clouds had its world premiere at the 77th Locarno Film Festival on 15 August 2024, competing for the Concorso Cineasti del Presente award. Prior to its premiere, Miyu Distribution acquired the film's distribution rights.

It also competed at the 2024 Ottawa International Animation Festival, in the Sutherland Trophy section of the 2024 BFI London Film Festival where it won a special mention, in the Harbour section of the 54th International Film Festival Rotterdam screened in February 2025, in the Contrechamp section of the 2025 Annecy International Animation Film Festival and in the International Animated Feature Films Competition of the 2025 Guadalajara International Film Festival where it won best international animated film.

The film had a limited theatrical release on June 19, 2025, in Dominican theaters in the Fine Arts chain.

== Accolades ==
Award / Film Festival	Date of ceremony	Category	Recipient(s)	Result	Ref.
Locarno Film Festival	17 August 2024	Golden Leopard – Filmmakers of the Present	Olivia & the Clouds	Nominated	
Locarno Film Festival	17 August 2024	Junior Jury Award	Olivia & the Clouds	Special Mention	
Ottawa International Animation Festival	28 September 2024	Best Feature	Olivia & the Clouds	Nominated	
BFI London Film Festival	20 October 2024	Sutherland Trophy	Olivia & the Clouds	Special Mention	
Havana Film Festival	13 December 2024	Best Animated Film	Olivia & the Clouds	Won	
Málaga Film Festival	22 March 2025	Zonazine – Silver Biznaga for Best Ibero-American Film	Olivia & the Clouds	Won	
Málaga Film Festival	22 March 2025	Film Schools Award for Best Film	Olivia & the Clouds	Won	
Filmfest Bremen	23 March 2025	Best Visual Innovation	Olivia & the Clouds	Won	
San Diego Latino Film Festival	23 March 2025	Best Feature Film	Olivia & the Clouds	Won	
Athens International Film And Video Festival	13 April 2025	Film House Award	Olivia & the Clouds	Won	
Stuttgart International Festival of Animated Film	10 May 2025	Animovie	Olivia & the Clouds	Special Mention	
Annecy International Animation Film Festival	14 June 2025	Contrechamp – Best Feature Film	Olivia & the Clouds	Nominated	
Guadalajara International Film Festival	14 June 2025	Best International Animation Feature Film	Olivia & the Clouds	Won	
Costa Rica International Film Festival	29 June 2025	Best Feature Film from Central America and the Caribbean	Olivia & the Clouds	Special Mention	
Animator (festival)	12 July 2025	International Full-Length Competition	Olivia & the Clouds	Special Mention	
Trinidad and Tobago Film Festival	28 September 2025	Best Feature-Length Fiction Film	Olivia & the Clouds	Special Mention	
Hispanic Heritage Film Festival	8 October 2025	Best Feature Film	Olivia & the Clouds	Special Mention	
Rengo International Film Festival	29 November 2025	Best Feature Film Fiction International	Olivia & the Clouds	Won	
Rengo International Film Festival	29 November 2025	Best Director International Fiction Feature	Tomás Pichardo Espaillat	Won	
La Silla Awards	18 December 2025	Best Animation	Olivia & The Clouds	Won	
Annie Awards	21 February 2026	Best Editorial - Feature	Tomás Pichardo Espaillat	Nominated	
Lanterna Mágica Festival	28 March 2026	Best Direction	Tomás Pichardo Espaillat	Won	
Lanterna Mágica Festival	28 March 2026	Best Animation Technique	Olivia & The Clouds	Won	
Fantaspoa	26 April 2026	Best Director	Tomás Pichardo Espaillat	Won	
Platino Awards	9 May 2026	Best Animated Feature	Olivia & The Clouds	Won	
Pulcinella Awards	30 May 2026	Best Animation	Olivia & The Clouds	Won	
The Best of DR	13 August 2026	Best Animated Feature	Olivia & The Clouds	Won	
Photoimagen	27 August 2026	Recognition Award	Tomás Pichardo Espaillat	Won	
Maguana Film Festival	14 November 2026	Best Lead Actor	Héctor Aníbal	Won	
Maguana Film Festival	14 November 2026	Special Jury Award for Editing and Post-production	Olivia & The Clouds	Won	
