= Sara Fantova =

Film director

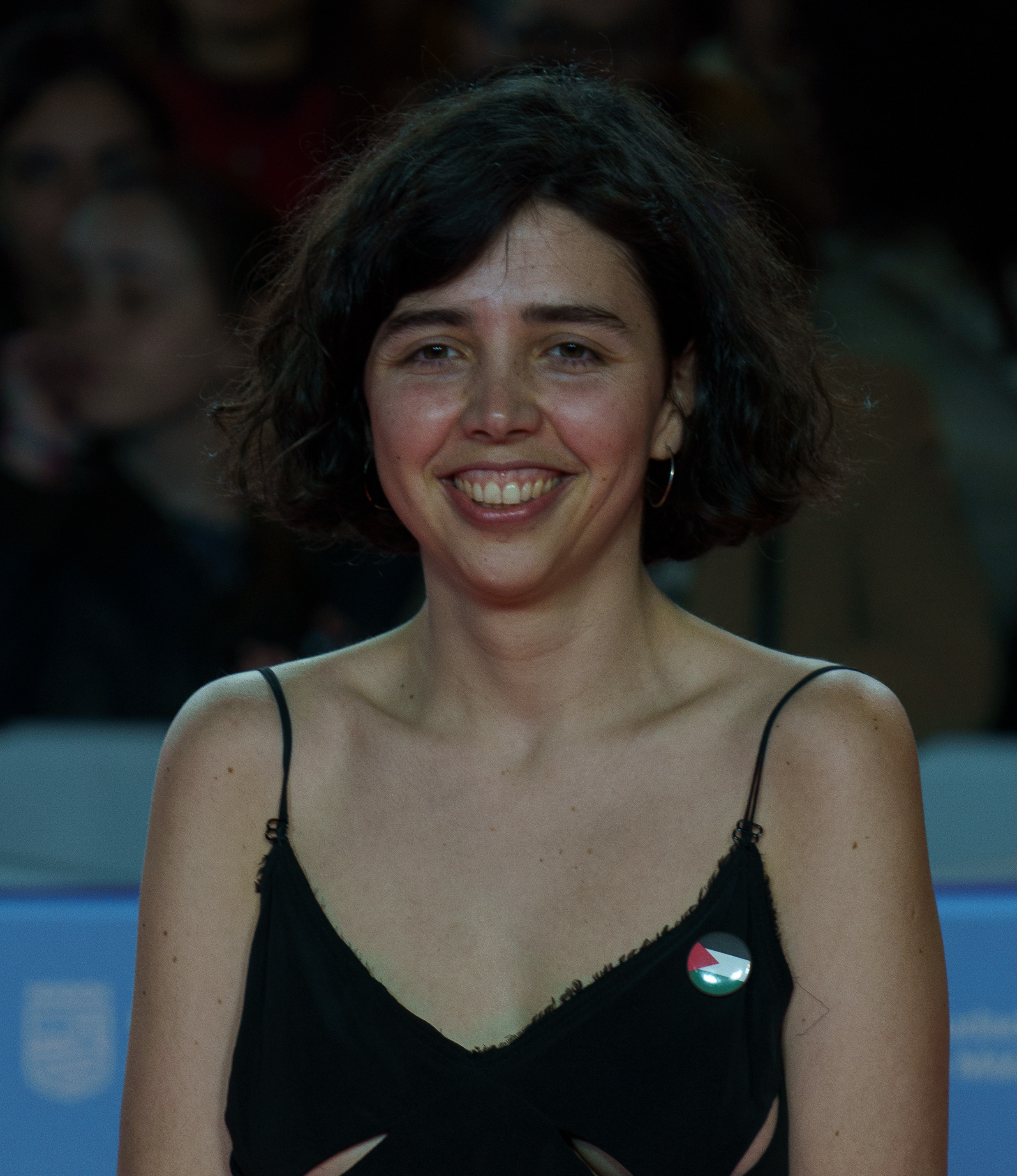
Fantova at the 2025 Málaga Film Festival

Sara Fantova (born 1993) is a Spanish film director.

Born in Bilbao, she studied at the ESCAC (Cinema and Audiovisual School of Catalonia). She teaches at Basque Country Film School.

== Filmography ==
- No me despertéis
- Don't Wake Me Up (2018)
- La filla d'algú (2019)
- Jone, Sometimes (Jone, batzuetan; Jone, a veces) (2025)
