= Sagarras Bajas =

- Locality
- Location within Aragon Location within Spain
- Coordinates: 42°7′44″N 0°32′10″E
- Country: Spain
- Autonomous community: Aragon
- Province: Province of Huesca
- Municipality: Tolva
- Elevation: 777 m (2,549 ft)

Population
  - Total: 17

Sagarras Bajas is a locality in the municipality of Tolva, in Huesca province, Aragon, Spain. As of 2020, it has a population of 17.

== Geography ==
Sagarras Bajas is located 101km east of Huesca.
