= The Portuguese House =

- Theatrical release poster
- Spanish: Una quinta portuguesa
- Portuguese: A Quinta
- Directed by: Avelina Prat
- Written by: Avelina Prat
- Produced by: Miriam Porté; Luís Urbano; Miguel Molina; Adán Aliaga
- Starring: Manolo Solo; Maria de Medeiros; Branka Katić; Rita Cabaço
- Cinematography: Santiago Racaj
- Edited by: Juliana Montañés
- Music by: Vincent Barrière
- Production companies: Distinto Films; O Som e a Fúria; Jaibo Films; Almendros Blancos AIE
- Distributed by: Filmax (es); NOS Audiovisuais (pt)
- Release dates: 17 March 2025 (Málaga); 9 May 2025 (Spain); 31 July 2025 (Portugal)
- Countries: Spain; Portugal
- Languages: Spanish; Portuguese

The Portuguese House (Spanish: Una quinta portuguesa; Portuguese: A Quinta) is a 2025 drama film written and directed by Avelina Prat. It stars Manolo Solo, Maria de Medeiros, and Branka Katić. It is a Spanish and Portuguese co-production.

The film had its world premiere at the 28th Málaga Film Festival on 17 March 2025 ahead of its theatrical release in Spain on 9 May 2025 by Filmax and in Portugal on 31 July 2025 by NOS Audiovisuais.

== Plot ==
Gutted by the disappearance of his Serbian wife, Fernando, a disoriented geography university lecturer from Barcelona, acquaints with Spanish gardener Manuel. He ends up in a Portuguese quinta, impersonating the gardener and establishing a friendship with the owner of the estate, the mysterious and warm Amalia.

== Cast ==
- Manolo Solo as Fernando / Manuel
- Maria de Medeiros as Amalia
- Rita Cabaço as Rita
- Branka Katić as Olga
- Xavi Mira as Manuel

== Production ==
The film is a Distinto Films co-production with O Som e a Fúria, Jaibo Films, and Almendros Blancos AIE and it had the participation of RTVE, 3Cat, À Punt, and RTP. It was shot in between Barcelona and Quinta da Aldeia, a quinta in Ponte de Lima.

== Release ==
The film was presented at the 28th Málaga Film Festival on 17 March 2025. It also made it to the international competition strand of the 26th BAFICI, to the 25th European Film Festival program held in conjunction with 8th Malaysia International Film Festival, to the main programme of the 53rd Norwegian International Film Festival, and to the international competition lineup of the 21st Santiago International Film Festival. It was released theatrically in Spain on 9 May 2025 by Filmax. By 1 June 2025, it had grossed €530,940 (84,438 admissions) at the Spanish box office.

Desforra Apache handled distribution in Portugal. A 31 July 2025 date was set for the film's theatrical release in Portugal.

== Reception ==
Alfonso Rivera of Cineuropa deemed the film to be "a delightful, enigmatic fable that restores our faith in an ill-fated humanity".

Andrea G. Bermejo of Cinemanía rated the film 4 out of 5 stars, considering that the mise-en-scène features "a delightful elegance and attention to detail, displaying a prosaic and at the same time poetic narrative economy".

Raquel Hernández Luján of HobbyConsolas gave the film 67 points ('acceptable'), declaring it "a beautiful and humanistic film that reflects a kindness rarely seen in cinema", yet warning that if you like movies with pace, the film is not for you.

Javier Ocaña of El País described the film as a "mysterious film with deep literary flavour (although it is not based on any novel), without ceasing to be excellent cinema".

== Accolades ==
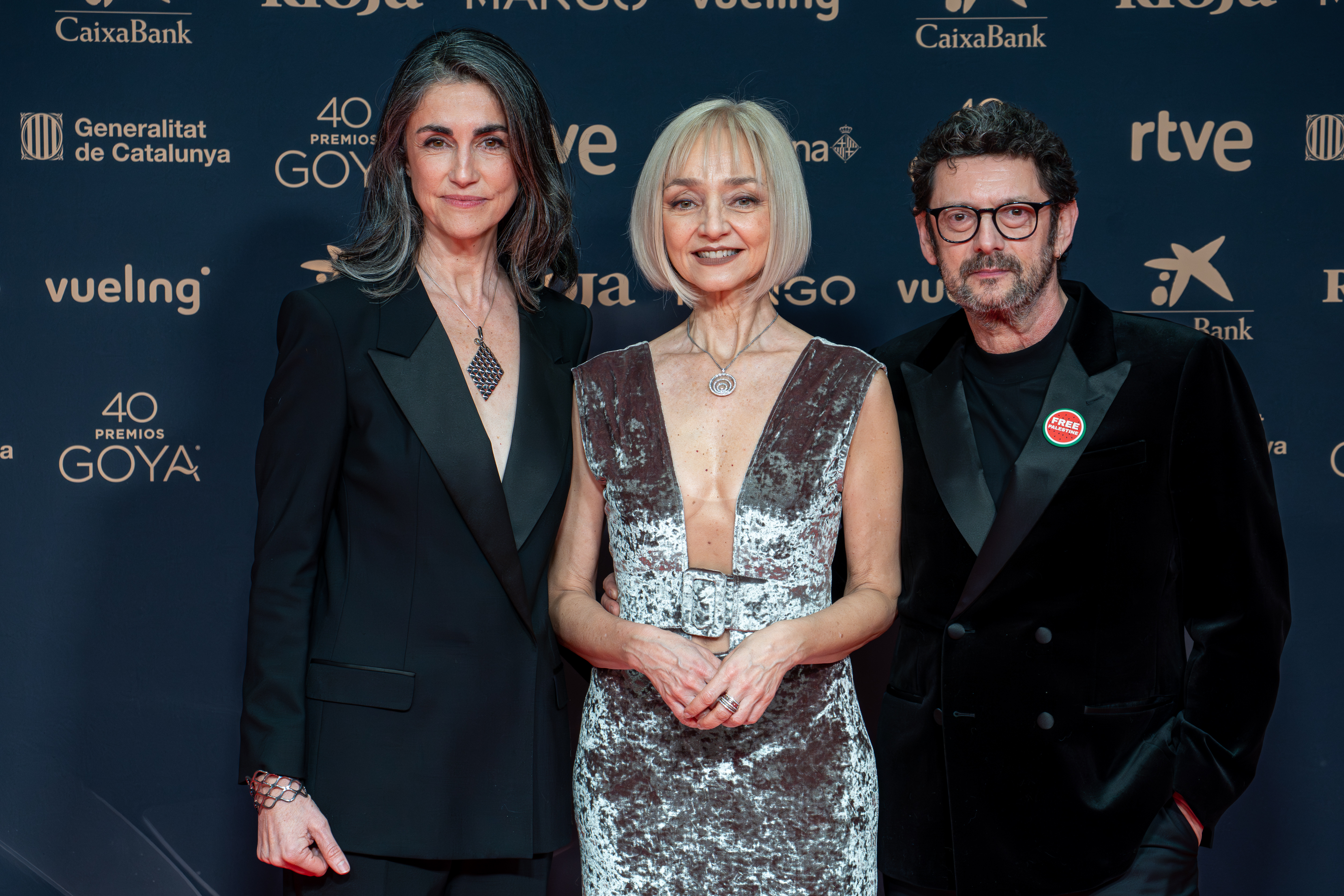
Avelina Prat, María de Medeiros, and Manolo Solo attending the 40th Goya Awards in February 2026

Year	Award	Category	Nominee(s)	Result	Ref.
2025	8th Lola Gaos Awards	Best Film		Won	
2025	8th Lola Gaos Awards	Best Director	Avelina Prat	Won	
2025	8th Lola Gaos Awards	Best Actor	Manolo Solo	Won	
2025	8th Lola Gaos Awards	Best Actress	Maria de Medeiros	Nominated	
2025	8th Lola Gaos Awards	Best Screenplay	Avelina Prat	Won	
2025	8th Lola Gaos Awards	Best Costume Design	Giovanna Ribes	Nominated	
2025	8th Lola Gaos Awards	Best Production Supervision	Goretti Pagès	Nominated	
2025	8th Lola Gaos Awards	Best Sound	Iván Martínez-Rufat	Nominated	
2025	8th Lola Gaos Awards	Best Editing	Juliana Montañés	Won	
2025	8th Lola Gaos Awards	Best Cinematography and Lighting	Santiago Racaj	Nominated	
2025	8th Lola Gaos Awards	Best Original Score	Vincent Barrière	Won	
2026	13th Feroz Awards	Best Supporting Actress in a Film	Maria de Medeiros	Nominated	
2026	5th Carmen Awards	Best Actor	Manolo Solo	Nominated	
2026	18th Gaudí Awards	Best Actor	Manolo Solo	Nominated	
2026	81st CEC Medals	Best Original Screenplay	Avelina Prat	Nominated	
2026	81st CEC Medals	Best Actor	Manolo Solo	Won	
2026	81st CEC Medals	Best Supporting Actress	Maria de Medeiros	Nominated	
2026	81st CEC Medals	Best Music	Vincent Barrière	Nominated	
2026	40th Goya Awards	Best Original Screenplay	Avelina Prat	Nominated	
2026	40th Goya Awards	Best Actor	Manolo Solo	Nominated	
2026	40th Goya Awards	Best Supporting Actress	Maria de Medeiros	Nominated	

== See also ==
- List of Spanish films of 2025
- List of Portuguese films of 2025
