= Dogs (2025 film) =

- Theatrical release poster
- Directed by: Gerardo Minutti
- Written by: Gerardo Minutti
- Produced by: Santiago López Rodríguez; Hernán Musaluppi; Diego Robino; Sandino Saravia Vinay; Lilia Scenna
- Starring: Néstor Guzzini; Marcelo Subiotto; María Elena Pérez
- Cinematography: Matías Lasarte
- Edited by: Manuel Ferrari
- Music by: Hernán Segret
- Production companies: Cimarrón Cine; Cinevinay
- Release dates: March 18, 2025 (Málaga); September 25, 2025 (Uruguay)
- Running time: 102 minutes
- Countries: Uruguay; Argentina
- Language: Spanish

Dogs (Spanish: Perros) is a 2025 black comedy film written and directed by Gerardo Minutti in his directorial debut. It stars Néstor Guzzini, Marcelo Subiotto and María Elena Pérez. It follows the conflict between two families from different social classes after the wealthier family's dog disappears.

A co-production between Uruguay and Argentina, the film had its world premiere at the 28th Málaga Film Festival on March 18, 2025, where it competed for the Golden Biznaga for Best Latin-American Film and María Elena Pérez was honored with the Silver Biznaga for Best Supporting Actress.

== Synopsis ==
The Saldañas are left to care for the house and dog of their wealthier neighbors, the Pernas. They take advantage of the situation to live comfortably. However, after the sudden disappearance of the pet, a violent conflict erupts between the two families.

== Cast ==
- Néstor Guzzini
- Marcelo Subiotto
- María Elena Pérez
- Catalina Arrillaga
- Noelia Campo
- Roberto Suárez

== Production ==
Principal photography lasted 5 weeks and concluded on April 6, 2024, in Montevideo, Uruguay.

== Release ==
Dogs had its world premiere on March 18, 2025, at the 28th Málaga Film Festival, and was then screened on April 10, 2025, at the 43rd Uruguay International Film Festival.

It was commercially released on September 25, 2025, in Uruguayan theaters.

== Accolades ==
Award / Festival	Date of ceremony	Category	Recipient(s)	Result	Ref.
Málaga Film Festival	23 March 2025	Best Latin-American Film	Dogs	Nominated	
Málaga Film Festival	23 March 2025	Best Supporting Actress	María Elena Pérez	Won	
