= Ciscar =

- Locality
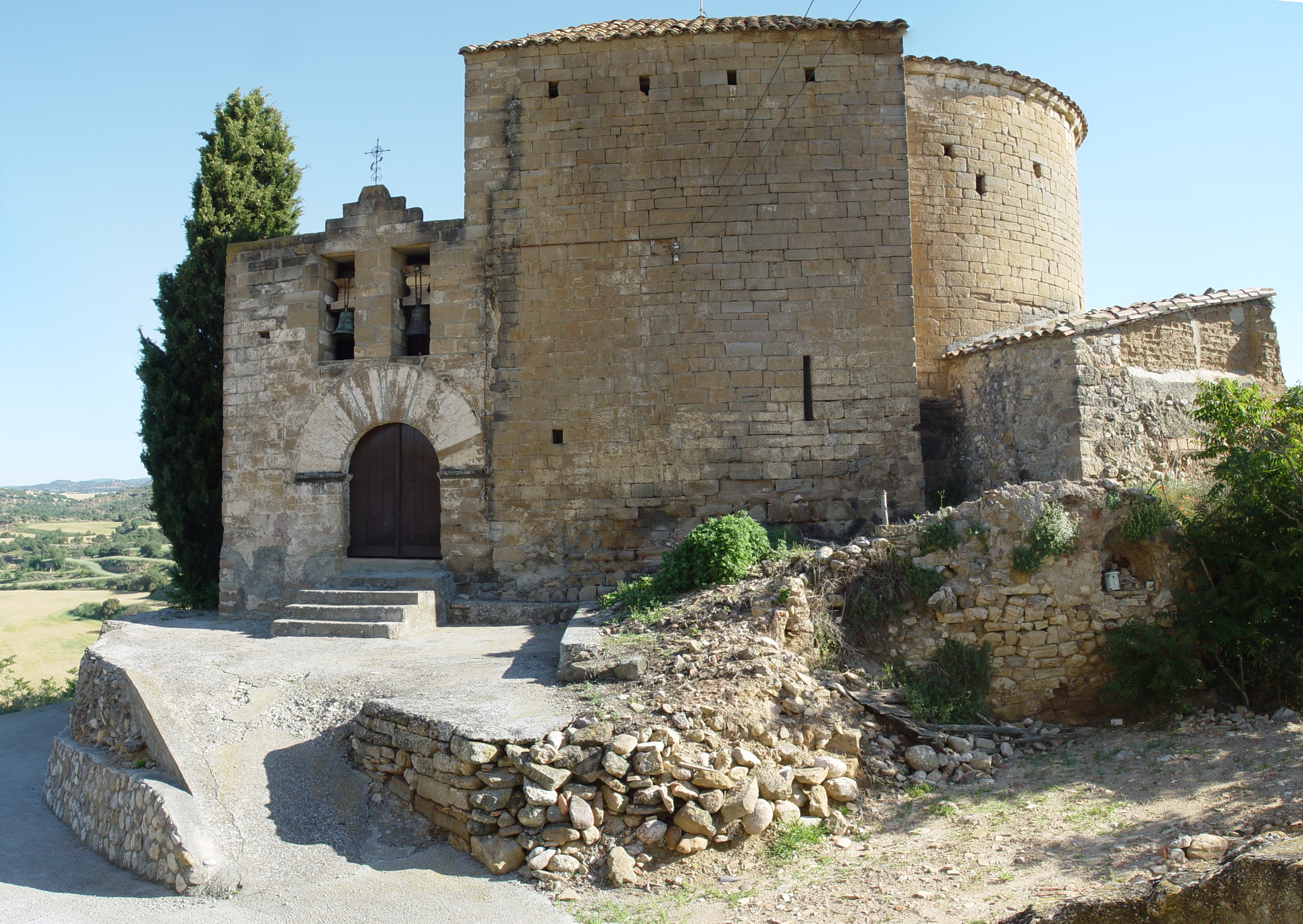

- Location within Aragon Location within Spain
- Coordinates: 42°4′35″N 0°32′58″E
- Country: Spain
- Autonomous community: Aragon
- Province: Province of Huesca
- Municipality: Benabarre
- Elevation: 577 m (1,893 ft)

Population
  - Total: 14

Ciscar is a locality located in the municipality of Benabarre, in Huesca province, Aragon, Spain. As of 2020, it has a population of 14.

== Geography ==
Ciscar is located 102km east of Huesca.
