= Castilló del Pla =

Castilló del Pla (Spanish) Castelló del Pla (Ribagorçan)
- Locality
- Location in Spain
- Coordinates: 42°1′42″N 0°27′17″E
- Country: Spain
- Autonomous community: Aragon
- Province: Huesca
- Comarca: Ribagorza
- Judicial district: Barbastro
- Municipality: Benabarre
- Time zone: UTC+1 (CET)
  - Summer (DST): UTC+2 (CEST)
- Postal code: 22580

Castilló del Pla (Castelló del Pla in Ribagorçan) is a locality belonging to the municipality of Benabarre, in the province of Huesca, Aragon, Spain.

Prehistoric sites have been found nearby.

== Monuments ==
- 18th-century parish church.
