= Caladrones =

- Locality
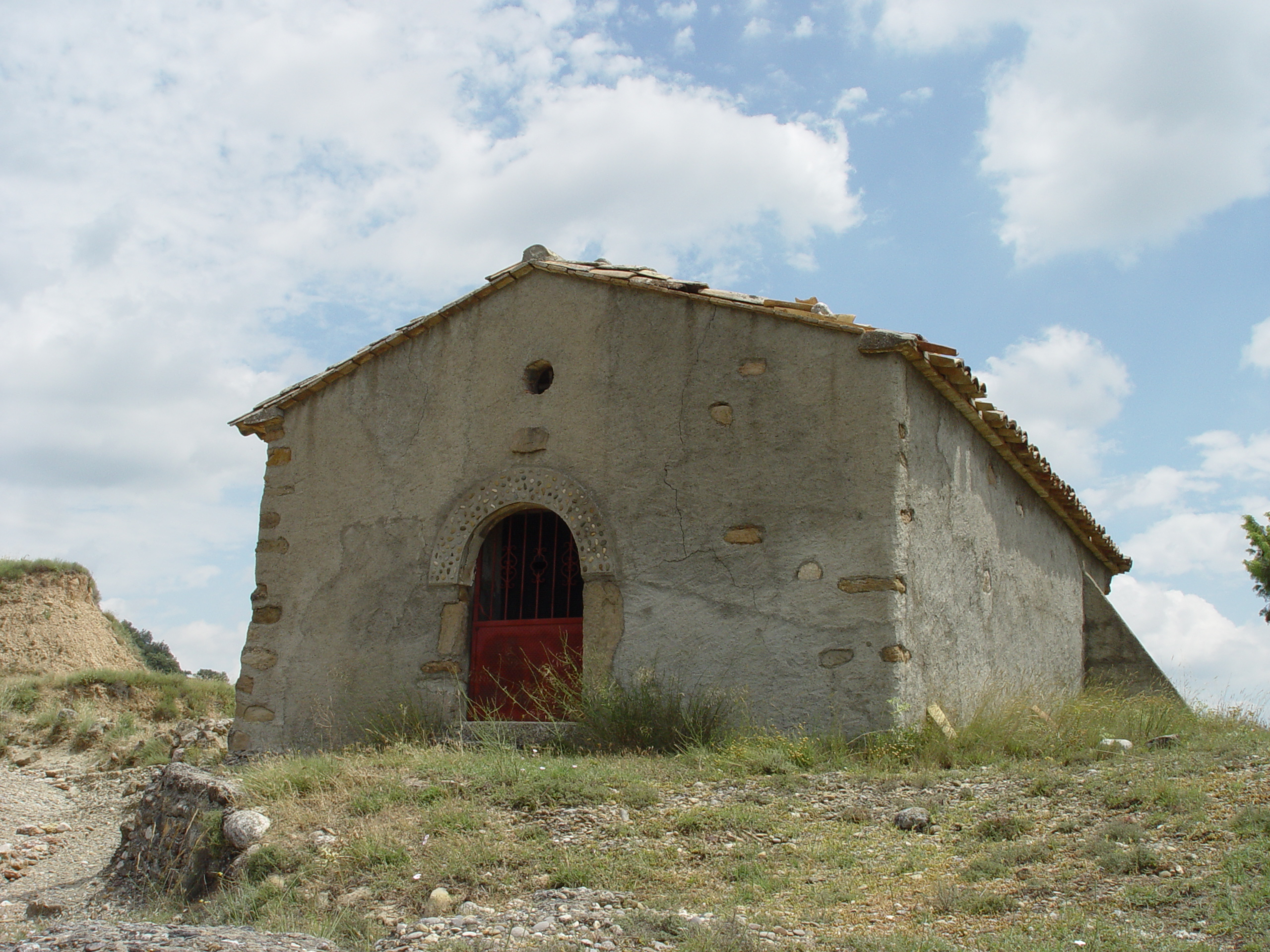

- Location within Aragon Location within Spain
- Coordinates: 42°4′25″N 0°31′24″E
- Country: Spain
- Autonomous community: Aragon
- Province: Province of Huesca
- Municipality: Benabarre
- Elevation: 605 m (1,985 ft)

Population
  - Total: 43

Caladrones is a locality located in the municipality of Benabarre, in Huesca province, Aragon, Spain. As of 2020, it has a population of 43.

== Geography ==
Caladrones is located 100km east of Huesca.
