= Jone, Sometimes =

- Theatrical release poster
- Basque: Jone, batzuetan
- Directed by: Sara Fantova
- Screenplay by: Sara Fantova; Núria Dunjó; Nuria Martín
- Starring: Olaia Aguayo; Josean Bengoetxea; Ainhoa Artetxe; Elorri Arrizabalaga
- Cinematography: Andreu Ortoll
- Edited by: Oriol Milan
- Music by: Pablo Seijo
- Production companies: ESCAC Studio; Escándalo Films; Amania Films; ECPV
- Distributed by: Atera Films
- Release dates: 15 March 2025 (Málaga); 12 September 2025 (Spain)
- Country: Spain
- Languages: Basque; Spanish

Jone, Sometimes (Basque: Jone, batzuetan) is a 2025 Spanish coming-of-age drama film directed by Sara Fantova. It stars newcomer Olaia Aguayo along with Josean Bengoetxea.

It premiered in the official selection of the 28th Málaga Film Festival on 15 March 2025.

== Plot ==
Set in Bilbao during the Aste Nagusia, the plot follows 20-year-old Jone, who falls for Olga while dealing with the worsening of her father's Parkinson's disease.

== Cast ==
- Olaia Aguayo as Jone
- Josean Bengoetxea as Aitor
- Ainhoa Artetxe as Olga
- Elorri Arrizabalaga as Marta

== Production ==
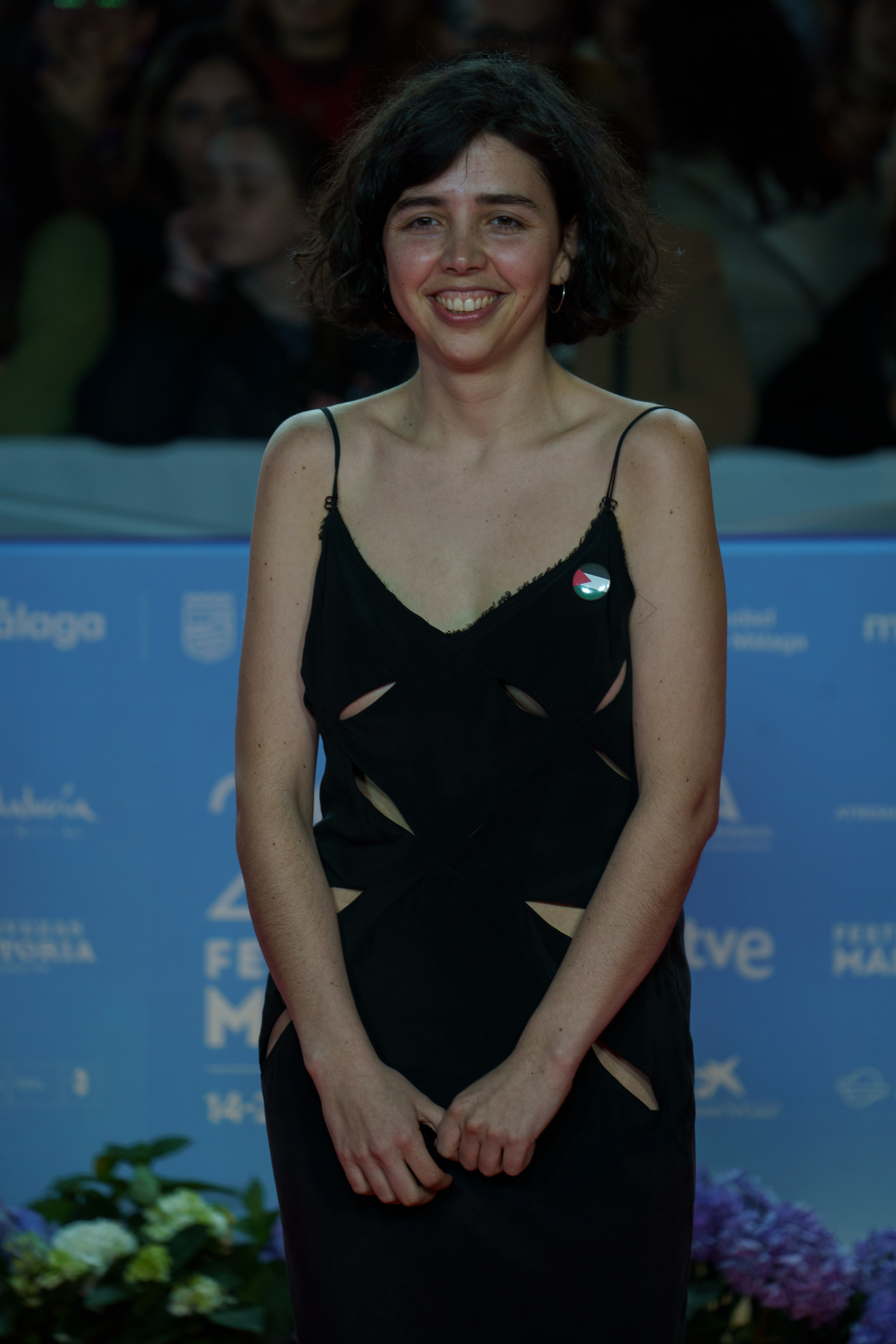
Director Sara Fantova at the red carpet of the 28th Málaga Film Festival on 15 March 2025.

The film, Sara Fantova's solo debut feature, was written by Fantova, Núria Dunjó, and Nuria Martín. It is an ESCAC Studio, Escándalo Films, Amania Films, and ECPV production. It was shot during the 2023 Aste Nagusia in Bilbao.

== Release ==
The film was presented on 15 March 2025 at the 28th Málaga Film Festival, where it earned a special mention for director Fantova from the official jury. For its Catalan premiere, it also made it to the programme of the D'A Barcelona Film Festival. It was selected for the 'Panorama España' slate of the 24th Las Palmas de Gran Canaria International Film Festival, and the Female Directors in Focus lineup of the 21st Santiago International Film Festival. Atera Films handled distribution in Spain, scheduling a 12 September 2025 theatrical release date.

== See also ==
- List of Spanish films of 2025
