= Pilzán =

- Locality
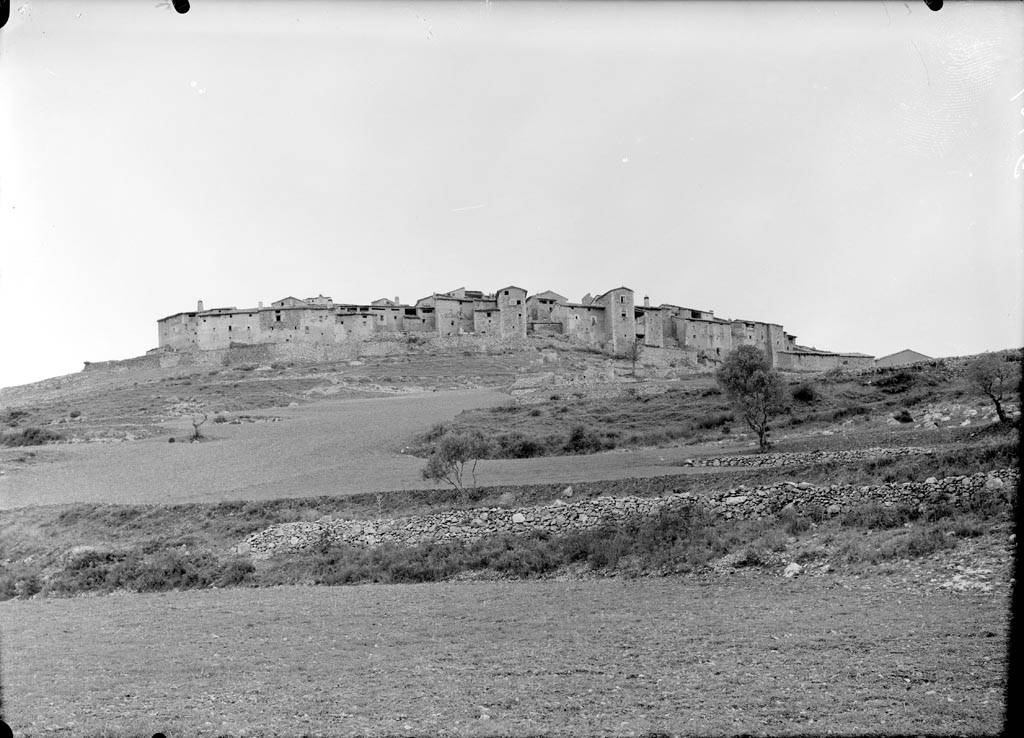

- Location within Aragon Location within Spain
- Coordinates: 42°3′7″N 0°29′9″E
- Country: Spain
- Autonomous community: Aragon
- Province: Province of Huesca
- Municipality: Benabarre
- Elevation: 916 m (3,005 ft)

Population
  - Total: 10

Pilzán is a locality located in the municipality of Benabarre, in Huesca province, Aragon, Spain. As of 2020, it has a population of 10.

== Geography ==
Pilzán is located 106km east of Huesca.
