= Tomás Pichardo Espaillat =

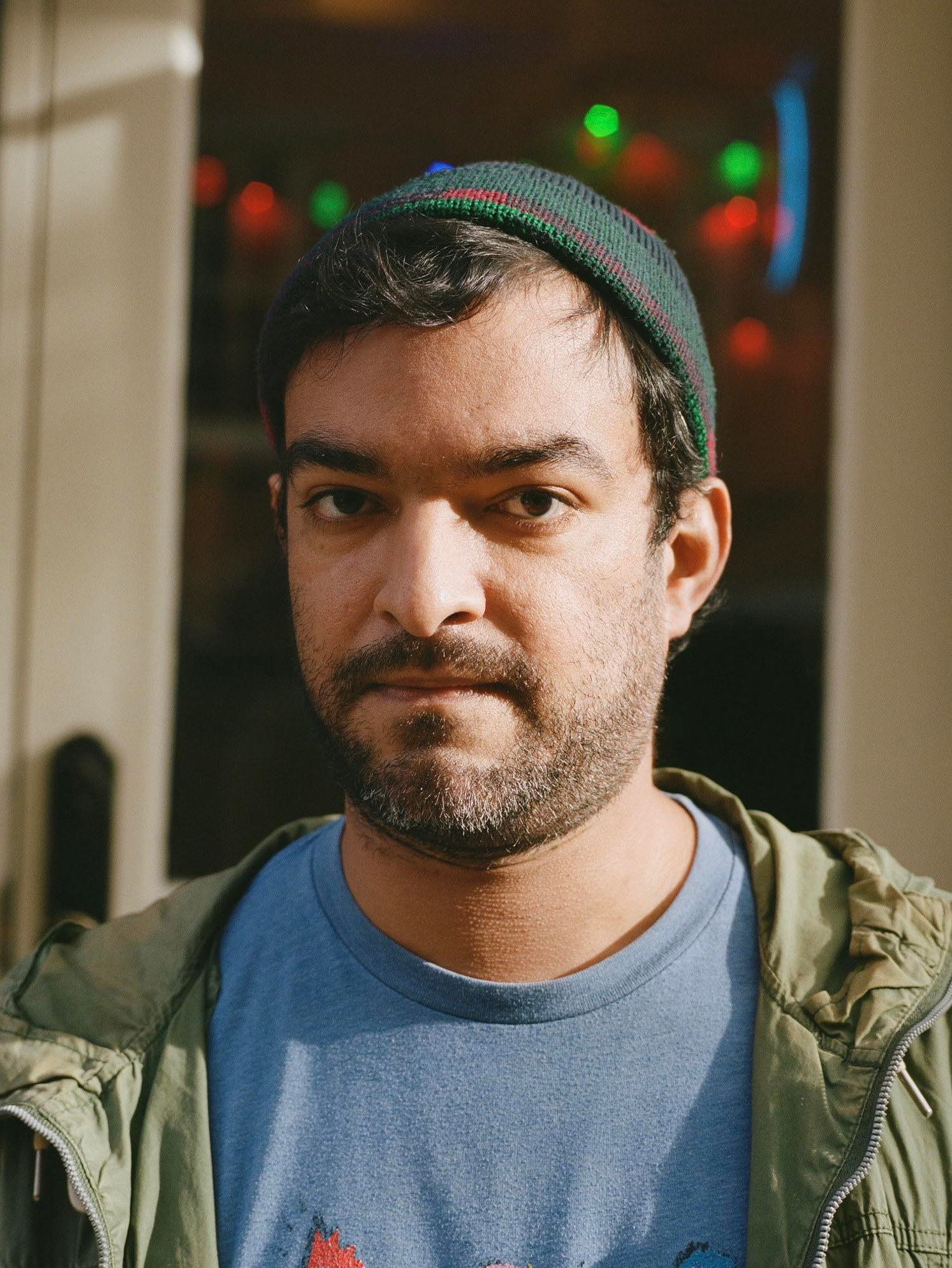
- Pichardo Espaillat in 2022
- Born: March 2, 1987 (age 39); Santo Domingo, Dominican Republic
- Education: Parsons, The New School for Design (BFA)
- Occupation: Animator • film director
- Years active: 2011–present
- Style: Magic realism

Tomás Pichardo Espaillat (born March 2, 1987) is a Dominican film director specialized in animated film and video art, best known for his animated feature film Olivia & The Clouds.

== Career ==
=== Early career ===
In 2008, Pichardo Espaillat graduated with a technical degree from the Fine Arts program at Altos de Chavón and then completed his undergraduate studies at Parsons, The New School for Design, in 2010. Between 2011 and 2013, he created several music videos and animated short films, which led to his acceptance into Fabrica Research Centre, the prestigious visual research center of the Benetton Group, in Treviso, Italy.

In 2015, Pichardo Espaillat held his first solo exhibition, "Niños Héroes," at the Fabrica Features gallery in Lisbon, Portugal. After returning to Santo Domingo, he began creating animation projects for TED-Ed and The School of Life. Some of these short films were screened at various festivals, including the Annecy International Animation Film Festival (France), Raindance Film Festival (London), the Havana Film Festival (Cuba), and Pictoplasma (Berlin), among others.

In 2016, Pichardo Espaillat held a joint exhibition with Dominican visual artist Luisito Nazario at the Centro de la Imagen in Santo Domingo. This marked the beginning of a professional relationship with the Center and its founder, Mayra Johnson. He also won second place in the Young Image Award in 2017 and second place in the Biennial Salon in 2019, both events organized by the Centro de la Imagen.

In 2021, Pichardo Espaillat won the award for best Hispanic animated short film at the Libélula Dorada Festival (Santo Domingo, Dominican Republic). In 2022, his short film about the Mirabal Sisters was a finalist at the Quirino Awards (Tenerife, Spain) and a retrospective of his work to date was presented at the “Fireworks” section of the Lago Film Fest (Treviso, Italy).

=== Olivia & The Clouds ===
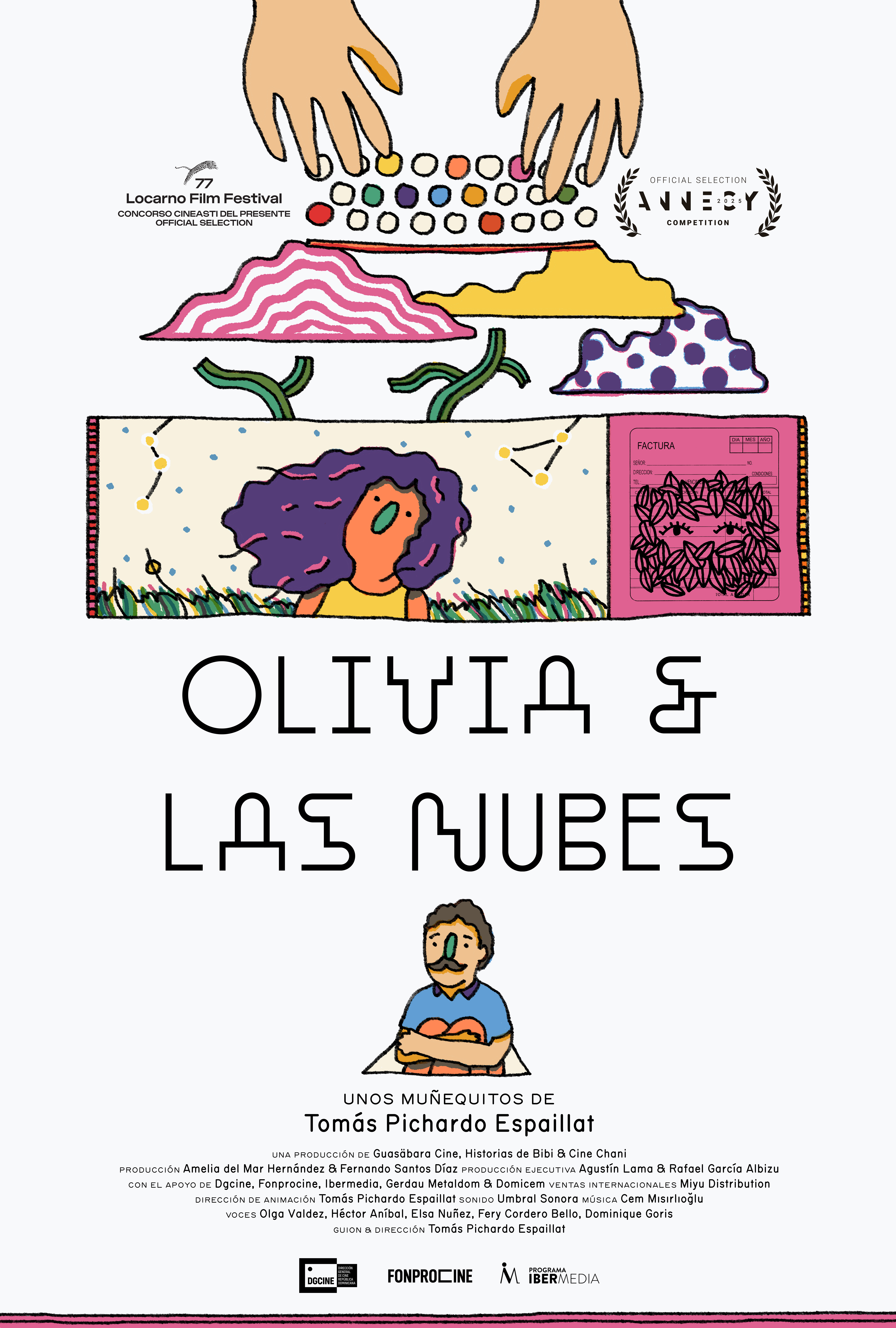
Promotional release poster

In 2014, Pichardo Espaillat began developing his first animated feature film, “Olivia & The Clouds.” This project won the Ibermedia 2019 development fund, the DGCINE 2019 FONPROCINE production fund for fiction and animation feature films, and participated in training labs at Animation! at Ventana Sur 2019 (Buenos Aires, Argentina), Berlinale Talents 2023 (Berlin, Germany) and Talents Guadalajara at the Guadalajara International Film Festival 2023 (Guadalajara, Mexico).

Olivia & the Clouds had its world premiere at the 77th Locarno Film Festival on 15 August 2024, competing for the Concorso Cineasti del Presente award. Prior to its premiere, Miyu Distribution acquired the film's distribution rights.

It also competed at the 2024 Ottawa International Animation Festival, in the Sutherland Trophy section of the 2024 BFI London Film Festival where it won a special mention, and at the 2024 Havana Film Festival where it won Best Animated Film.

In 2025, the film competed in the Harbour section of the 54th International Film Festival Rotterdam, in the Zonazine section of the 28th Málaga Film Festival, where it won the Silver Biznaga for Best Ibero-American Film. In the Contrechamp section of the 2025 Annecy International Animation Film Festival and in the International Animated Feature Films Competition of the 2025 Guadalajara International Film Festival where it won best international animated film.

In 2026, the film competed at the 13th Platino Awards, where it won the award for best animated film, marking the first time a Dominican production has won an award at the Platino Awards.
