= Luzás =

- Locality
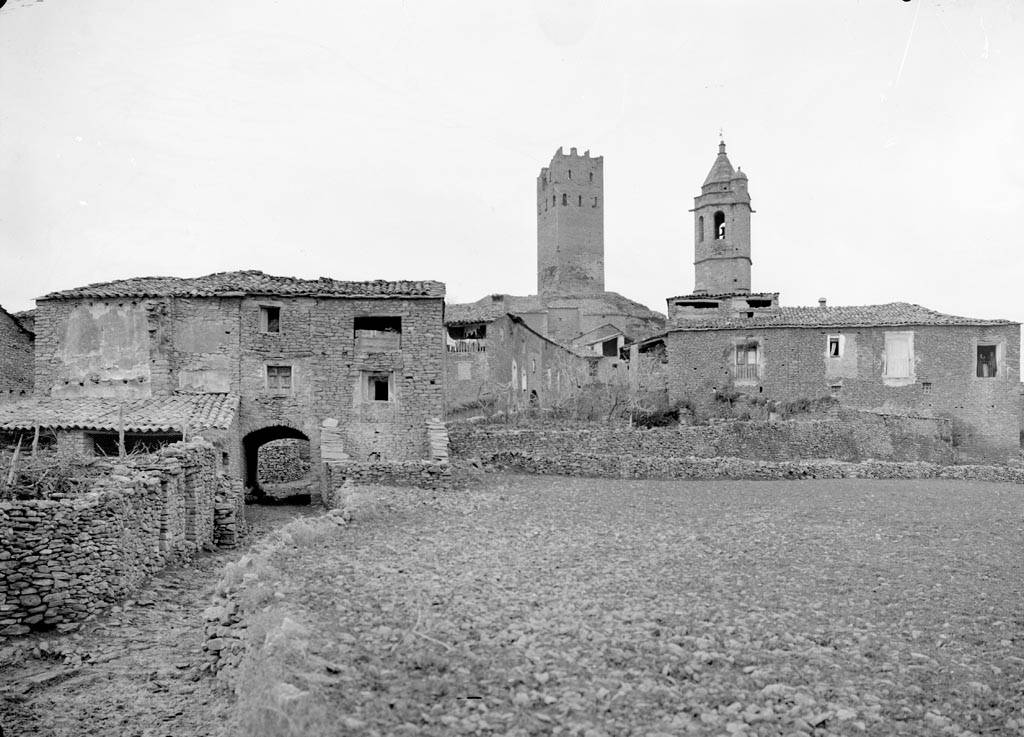

- Location within Aragon Location within Spain
- Coordinates: 42°9′21″N 0°34′38″E
- Country: Spain
- Autonomous community: Aragon
- Province: Province of Huesca
- Municipality: Tolva
- Elevation: 787 m (2,582 ft)

Population
  - Total: 13

Luzás is a locality located in the municipality of Tolva, in Huesca province, Aragon, Spain. As of 2020, it has a population of 13.

== Geography ==
Luzás is located 107km east of Huesca.
