= 18th Gaudí Awards =

2026 Catalan film awards ceremony

- Date: 8 February 2026
- Site: Gran Teatre del Liceu, Barcelona, Catalonia, Spain
- Hosted by: Nora Navas; Maria Molins; Laura Weissmahr; Carla Quílez; Maria Arnal

Highlights
- Most awards: Sirāt (8)
- Most nominations: Romería (13)

Television coverage
- Network: TV3
- Viewership: 0.27 million (18.7%)

The 18th Gaudí Awards ceremony, presented by the Catalan Film Academy, took place on 8 February 2026 at the Gran Teatre del Liceu in Barcelona.

== Background ==
In December 2025, actor, screenwriter, and director Sílvia Munt was announced as the recipient of the Honorary Gaudí. The nominations were read by Laura Weissmahr and La Dani from the auditorium of La Pedrera on 16 December 2025.

The gala opened with Salvador Sobral and Magalí Sare performing "L'àguila negra". Other musical performers included Zoe Bonafonte and Joan Dausà ("Gallo rojo, gallo negro") and Marina Rossell ("La gavina"). The TV3 broadcast in Catalonia commanded 272,000 viewers (a 18.7% audience share).

== Winners and nominees ==
The winners nominees are listed as follows:

Best Film: Frontier — Marta Ramírez, Jaume Banacolocha, Jordi Frades, Albert Sagalès, Ignasi Serra, Katleen Goossens, (producers); Join Me for Breakfast — Miriam Porté, Àngels Masclans, Roger Torras (producers); Strange River — Xavi Font (producer); Away — Carles Torras, Sergio Adrià (producers); Wolfgang — Marta Sánchez de Miguel, Gerard Verdaguer, Núria Valls, Adrián Guerra, Ghislain Barrois, Álvaro Augustin, Mar Ilundain, Oriol Sala-Patau, Esther Dueñas (producers)	Best Non-Catalan Language Film: Sirāt — Oriol Maymó, Domingo Corral, Oliver Laxe, Xavi Font, Pedro Almodóvar, Agustín Almodóvar, Esther García, Mani Mortazavi, Andrea Queralt (producers); The Exiles — Antonio Chavarrías, Alba Bosch Duran, Olmo Figueredo González-Quevedo, Sara Gómez, Giancarlo Nasi (producers); Romería — María Zamora, Àngels Masclans, Olimpia Pont Cháfer (producers); Deaf — Miriam Porté, Nuria Muñoz Ortín, Adolfo Blanco (producers)
Best Director: Eva Libertad — Deaf; Albert Serra — Afternoons of Solitude; Carla Simón — Romería; Oliver Laxe — Sirāt	Best New Director: Gemma Blasco — Fury; Gerard Oms — Away; Iván Morales — Join Me for Breakfast; Jaume Claret Muxart — Strange River
Best Original Screenplay: Cesc Gay, Eduard Sola — My Friend Eva; Belén Funes, Marçal Cebrian — The Exiles; Gemma Blasco, Eva Pauné — Fury; Gerard Oms — Away	Best Adapted Screenplay: Eva Libertad — Deaf; based on the short film Sorda by Libertad; Carla Simón — Romería; based on the letters by Simón's mother; Celia Rico — The Good Manners; based on the novel La buena letra by Rafael Chirbes; Iván Morales, Almudena Monzó — Join Me for Breakfast; based on the play Esmorza amb mi by Iván Morales
Best Actress: Ángela Cervantes — Fury as Alexandra; Maria Rodríguez Soto — Frontier as Mercè; Miriam Garlo — Deaf as Ángela; Nora Navas — My Friend Eva as Eva	Best Actor: Mario Casas — Away as Sergio; Álvaro Cervantes — Join Me for Breakfast as Omar; Manolo Solo — The Portuguese House as Fernando / Manuel; Sergi López — Sirāt as Luis
Best Supporting Actress: Bruna Cusí — Frontier as Juliana; Carla Linares — Fury as Julia; Elena Irureta — Deaf as Elvira; Nausicaa Bonnín — Strange River as Mònica	Best Supporting Actor: Álvaro Cervantes — Deaf as Héctor; Àlex Monner — Fury as Adrián; Asier Etxeandía — Frontier as José Antonio Sánchez; Ivan Massagué — Join Me for Breakfast as Salva
Best New Performance: Llúcia Garcia — Romería as Marina; Bernat Solé Palau — Strange River as Biel; Elvira Lara — The Exiles as Anabel; Jan Monter Palau — Strange River as Dídac	Best Original Score: Kangding Ray — Sirāt; Clara Peya — Wolfgang; Ernest Pipó — Romería; Nika Son — Strange River
Best Production Supervision: Oriol Maymó — Sirāt; Andrés Mellinas — Strange River; Elisa Sirvent Aguirre — Romería; Goretti Pagès — Deaf	Best Documentary Film: Afternoons of Solitude — Montse Triola, Albert Serra, Luis Ferrón, Pedro Palacios, Ricard Sales, Pierre-Olivier Bardet; Constel·lació Portabella — Lluís Miñarro, Claudio Zulian; The Drunkmen's Marseillaise — Bernat Manzano, Alba Lombardía, Enrica Capra, Miguel Ángel Blanca, Pablo Gil Rituerto; Mares — María Nova López, Carles Brugueras, Marieke Van Den Bersselaar, Ariadna Seuba
Best Short Film: De sucre — Ariadna Dot, Tono Folguera, Rafa Molés, Pepe Andreu, Clàudia Cedó; Campolivar — Antonio Chavarrías, Alba Bosch Duran, Alejandra Mora; La nostra habitació — Xavier Font, Carlos Pardo Ros, Jaume Claret Muxart, Andrea Vázquez García; Nens — Laura Rubirola, Anna Martí Domingo	Best Animated Film: Olivia and the Invisible Earthquake — Mikel Mas Bilbao, Ramón Alós, Irene Iborra Rizo, Eduard Puertas; The Treasure of Barracuda — Valérie Delpierre, Àlex Cervantes, Álvaro García, Raphaële Ingberg; Hanna i els nadals oblidats – Ángeles Hernández, David Matamoros; The Light of Aisha — Peter Keydel, Raúl Berninches, Carlos Fernández, Laura Fernández Brites, Holger Weiss, Joseph Cristopher Koh, Albert Cheok
Best European Film: Flow (Latvia); Conclave (United Kingdom); The Seed of the Sacred Fig (Germany); The Brutalist (United Kingdom)	Best Art Direction: Laia Ateca — Sirāt; Anna Auquer — Deaf; Marta Bazaco — Frontier; Mónica Bernuy — Romería
Best Cinematography: Mauro Herce — Sirāt; Artur Tort — Afternoons of Solitude; Pablo Paloma — Strange River; Hélène Louvart — Romería	Best Editing: Albert Serra, Artur Tort — Afternoons of Solitude; Cristóbal Fernández — Sirāt; Neus Ballús — Away; Sergio Jiménez, Ana Pfaff — Romería
Best Costume Design: Mercè Paloma — Frontier; Anna Aguilà — Romería; Désirée Guirao, Angélica Muñoz — Deaf; Nadia Acimi — Sirāt	Best Sound: Amanda Villavieja, Laia Casanovas, Yasmina Praderas — Sirāt; Eva Valiño, Alejandro Castillo — Romería; Jordi Ribas, Bruno Tarrière — Afternoons of Solitude; Urko Garai, Enrique G. Bermejo, Alejandro Castillo — Deaf
Best Visual Effects: Pep Claret, Lluís Rivera, Benjamin Ageorges — Sirāt; Anna Aragonès, Bernat Aragonés, Alice Rathert, Christian Pundschus — Romería; Xavi Molas, Oliwia Trybel — Frontier; Xavier Pérez, Arnaud Chelet — Afternoons of Solitude	Best Makeup and Hairstyles: Zaira Eva Adén — Sirāt; Barbara Boucke — Frontier; Danae Gatell, Ale Salvat — Fury; Paty López, Paco Rodríguez H. — Romería

=== Films with multiple nominations and awards ===
Films with multiple nominations
Nominations	Film
13	Romería
12	Sirāt
10	Deaf
8	Strange River
8	Frontier
6	Fury
6	Afternoons of Solitude
5	Away
5	Join Me for Breakfast
3	The Exiles
2	My Friend Eva

Films with multiple awards
Awards	Film
8	Sirāt
3	Frontier
3	Deaf
2	Afternoons of Solitude
2	Fury

=== Audience Award ===
- Frontier

=== Honorary Gaudí ===
- Sílvia Munt
