= Cowgirl (film) =

- Theatrical release poster
- Directed by: Cristina Fernández Pintado; Miguel Llorens
- Screenplay by: Rafael Albert; Cristina Fernández Pintado; Miguel Llorens
- Produced by: Lorena Torres; Nuria Velasco; Anaïs Schaaff; Abigail Schaaff
- Starring: Isabel Rocatti; Carlos Cuevas; Pep Munné
- Cinematography: Miguel Llorens
- Edited by: Alfonso Suárez
- Music by: Clara Peya
- Production companies: The Fly Hunter; Aguacate & Calabaza Films; Produccions Quart
- Distributed by: Filmax
- Release dates: 21 April 2026 (BCN Film Fest); 22 May 2026 (Spain)
- Running time: 109 minutes
- Country: Spain
- Language: Catalan

Cowgirl is a 2026 Spanish romantic comedy-drama film directed by Cristina Fernández Pintado and Miguel Llorens starring Isabel Rocatti, Carlos Cuevas, and Pep Munné.

== Plot ==
The plot follows Empar, a 62 year-old woman living alone in a small village in Ports who finds solace in her cow Tona after the loss of her husband and son. Long infatuated with Empar, local Bernat seeks to gets closer to her while young Riqui moves into the village.

== Cast ==
- Isabel Rocatti as Empar
- Carlos Cuevas as Riqui
- Pep Munné as Bernat
- Joaquín Climent
- Carles Sanjaime
- Verònica Andrés
- Àngel Fígols
- Mamen García
- Amparo Fernández

The cow Candela portrays Tona in the film.

== Production ==
Cowgirl was produced by The Fly Hunter, Aguacate & Calabaza Films, and Produccions Quart, and it had the participation of RTVE, À Punt, and 3Cat. Shot in Valencian (Catalan), it was lensed by Miguel Llorens and scored by Clara Peya. Filming locations included La Tinença de Benifassà, El Maestrat and Els Ports.

== Release ==
The film premiered at the BCN Film Fest in April 2026. It was also programmed at the Alicante International Film Festival. Distributed by Filmax, it was released theatrically in Spain on 22 May 2026.

== Reception ==
Juan Pando of Fotogramas rated Cowgirl 3 out of 5 stars, welcoming "a story as simple yet as true" as the one told by the film.

Sabela Pillado of La Voz de Galicia declared Cowgirl a "kind, unadorned and human film about second chances, mature love, friendship and family".

Carmen L. Lobo of La Razón gave the film a 3-star rating, declaring it "a warm, charming rural film, spoken in Valencian".

== Accolades ==
Year	Award	Category	Nominee(s)	Result	Ref.
2026	9th Lola Gaos Awards	Best Film		Pending	
2026	9th Lola Gaos Awards	Best Actress	Isabel Rocatti	Pending	
2026	9th Lola Gaos Awards	Best Actor	Pep Munné	Pending	
2026	9th Lola Gaos Awards	Best Screenplay	Cristina Fernández Pintado, Miguel Llorens, Rafa Albert	Pending	
2026	9th Lola Gaos Awards	Best Cinematography and Lighting	Miguel Llorens	Pending	
2026	9th Lola Gaos Awards	Best Editing	Alfonso Suárez	Pending	
2026	9th Lola Gaos Awards	Best Production Supervision	Lorena Torres, Mila Luengo	Pending	
2026	9th Lola Gaos Awards	Best Art Direction	Jero Bono	Pending	
2026	9th Lola Gaos Awards	Best Costume Design	Raquel Porter	Pending	
2026	9th Lola Gaos Awards	Best Makeup and Hairstyles	Vicen Betí	Pending	

== See also ==
- List of Spanish films of 2026
