= Strange River =

- Catalan theatrical release poster
- Catalan: Estrany riu
- Directed by: Jaume Claret Muxart
- Screenplay by: Jaume Claret Muxart; Meritxell Colell
- Starring: Jan Monter Palau; Nausicaa Bonnín; Francesco Wenz; Jordi Oriol Canals; Bernat Solé Palau; Roc Colell Moncunill
- Cinematography: Pablo Paloma
- Edited by: Maria Castan de Manuel; Meritxell Colell
- Music by: Nika Son
- Production companies: ZuZú Cinema; Miramemira; Schuldenberg Films
- Distributed by: Elastica Films
- Release dates: 29 August 2025 (Venice); 3 October 2025 (Spain)
- Running time: 105 minutes
- Countries: Spain; Germany
- Language: Catalan

Strange River (Catalan: Estrany riu) is a 2025 coming-of-age drama film directed by Jaume Claret Muxart, in his directorial debut feature. It stars newcomer Jan Monter, alongside Nausicaa Bonnín, Jordi Oriol and Francesco Wenz. It is a Spanish-German co-production.

The film had its world premiere at the Orizzonti section of the 82nd Venice International Film Festival on 29 August 2025. It was theatrically released in Spain on 3 October by Elastica Films.

== Plot ==
The plot explores the sexual awakening of teenager Dídac upon coming across a mysterious boy in the waters during a bicycle trip with his family along the Danube.

== Cast ==
- Jan Monter as Dídac
- Nausicaa Bonnín
- Jordi Oriol
- Francesco Wenz
- Bernat Solé
- Roc Colell as Guiu

== Production ==
The film is a Spanish-German co-production by ZuZú Cinema and Miramemira alongside Schuldenberg Films. It had the participation of 3Cat and funding from Eurimages, ICAA, ICEC, FFF Bayern, and DFFF. Shooting locations included the German state of Baden-Württemberg.

== Release ==
The film landed its world premiere in the Orizzonti section of the 82nd Venice International Film Festival on 29 August 2025. Its festival run also included screenings in the 'Zabaltegi-Tabakalera' section of the 73rd San Sebastián International Film Festival, the 22nd Reykjavík International Film Festival (RIFF), the 'Flash Forward' section of the 30th Busan International Film Festival, and the New Directors competition of the 61st Chicago International Film Festival.

Distributed by Elastica Films, it was released theatrically in Spain on 3 October 2025.

== Reception ==
Jonathan Romney of Screen International welcomed that Claret Muxart "shows a canny awareness of the tropes" [of Summer holiday stories], "giving them a fresh, sensitive working-over" in the film, which "sustains its mood of mystery and suggestion" throughout.

Marta Medina del Valle of El Confidencial rated the film 4 out 5 stars, declaring it "delicate, poetic, and certainly nostalgic".

Rubén Romero Santos of Cinemanía rated the film 3½ out of 5 stars, singling out as its sensory perception or hapticity as its most notable contribution.

Matthew Joseph Jenner of International Cinephile Society rated the film 4½ out of 5 stars, billing it as a "an intimate, human story of identity that draws from a long tradition of coming-of-age narratives and stories of the birth of queer desire".

The jury of the Reykjavík International Film Festival (Mohsen Makhmalbāf, Giona A. Nazzaro, and Saga Garðarsdóttir) awarding Strange River the Golden Puffin extolled how Claret Muxart "reveals a precocious and accomplished talent that never indulges in mannerisms or formalism", celebrating the film as "a complex symphony of unspoken yet deeply perceived emotions".

== Accolades ==
Year	Award	Category	Nominee(s)	Result	Ref.
2025	22nd Reykjavík International Film Festival	Golden Puffin		Won	
2026	18th Gaudí Awards	Best Film		Nominated	
2026	18th Gaudí Awards	Best New Director	Jaume Claret Muxart	Nominated	
2026	18th Gaudí Awards	Best Supporting Actress	Nausicaa Bonnín	Nominated	
2026	18th Gaudí Awards	Best New Performance	Bernat Solé Palau	Nominated	
2026	18th Gaudí Awards	Best New Performance	Jan Monter Palau	Nominated	
2026	18th Gaudí Awards	Best Production Supervision	Andrés Mellinas	Nominated	
2026	18th Gaudí Awards	Best Original Score	Nika Son	Nominated	
2026	18th Gaudí Awards	Best Cinematography	Pablo Paloma	Nominated	
2026	40th Goya Awards	Best New Director	Jaume Claret Muxart	Nominated	
2026	40th Goya Awards	Best New Actor	Jan Monter Palau	Nominated	

== See also ==
- List of Spanish films of 2025
