= Frontier (film) =

- Theatrical release poster
- Catalan: Frontera
- Directed by: Judith Colell
- Screenplay by: Miguel Ibáñez Monroy; Gerard Giménez Forner
- Produced by: Marta Ramírez; Jaume Banacolocha; Jordi Frades; Albert Sagalés; Ignasi Serra; Katleen Goossens
- Starring: Miki Esparbé; Maria Rodríguez Soto; Asier Etxeandia; Bruna Cusí; Kevin Janssens; Jordi Sánchez; Joren Seldeslachts; Ainet Jounou; Jael Borràs; Anna Franziska Jäger; Lauren Müller; Pepa López; Maria Molins
- Cinematography: Andreu Adam Rubiralta
- Edited by: Liana Artigal
- Music by: Liesa Van der Aa
- Production companies: Crespeth Films; Coming Soon Films; Diagonal; Bulletproof Cupid
- Distributed by: Filmax
- Release dates: 25 October 2025 (Seminci); 12 December 2025 (Spain)
- Countries: Spain; Belgium
- Languages: Catalan; Spanish; German; French

Frontier (Catalan: Frontera) is a 2025 historical drama film directed by Judith Colell from a screenplay by Miguel Ibáñez Monroy and Gerard Giménez. It cast is toplined by Miki Esparbé, Maria Rodríguez Soto, Asier Etxeandia, Bruna Cusí, Kevin Janssens, and Jordi Sánchez. The film is a Spanish-Belgian co-production.

== Plot ==
The plot is set in 1943 against the backdrop of World War II. In a small border village close to Sort, customs officer Manel Grau defies his superiors embarking on a dangerous mission to help Jews flee from Vichy France through the Spanish-French border with help from neighbor Juliana and French smuggler Jerôme.

== Cast ==
- Miki Esparbé as Manel Grau
- Bruna Cusí as Juliana
- Jordi Sánchez as Ovidi
- Asier Etxeandia as José Antonio Sánchez
- Maria Rodríguez Soto as Mercè
- Kevin Janssens as Jerôme
- Maria Molins as Flors
- Tian Tosas as Quimet
- Pepa López as Neus
- Lauren Müller as Saskia
- Joren Seldeslachts as Rudolph Meyer
- Anna Franziska Jäger as refugee

== Production ==
The film is a Spanish-Belgian co-production by Crespeth Films Coming Soon Films and Diagonal (Banijay Iberia) alongside Bulletproof Cupid, with the participation of RTVE and 3Cat, and backing from ICEC, ICAA, Screen Flanders, the Belgian Federal Government, BNP Paribas and Creative Europe MEDIA. Shooting locations included the Pallars. It was shot in Catalan, Spanish, German, and French.

== Release ==
Frontier was presented at a RTVE gala of the 70th Valladolid International Film Festival (Seminci) on 25 October 2025. Filmax released theatrically the film in Spain on 12 December 2025. Menemsha Films acquired North American rights to the film. The film's festival run also included selections for screenings at the 29th Tallinn Black Nights Film Festival and the 37th Palm Springs International Film Festival (for its California premiere).

== Reception ==
Raquel Hernández Luján of HobbyConsolas gave the film 57 points, praising "the cinematography, the production design, and certain well-resolved moments of tension", but lamenting the "little emotion in a story that should make our hair stand on end".

Toni Vall of Cinemanía rated the film 4 out of 5 stars, writing about how Colell achieves "great depth" with "an almost flawless film, precise in what it tells and how it tells it, in its actors, in the dramatic nuances, and in the uncertainty" inhabiting its characters.

Carmen L. Lobo of La Razón rated the film 3 out of 5 stars, positively mentioning the technical features, but lamenting how the story that the film tells "is terrifying, but it rarely manages to shock" the viewer.

Luis Martínez of El Mundo gave the film a 3-star rating, finding the screenplay to be flawed, as "in its desire to tell everything, to bring in more voices and characters than the logic of the drama can digest, the film ends up confusing and confusing itself".

== Accolades ==
Year	Award	Category	Nominee(s)	Result	Ref.
2026	18th Gaudí Awards	Best Film		Pending	
2026	18th Gaudí Awards	Best Actress	Maria Rodríguez Soto	Pending	
2026	18th Gaudí Awards	Best Supporting Actress	Bruna Cusí	Pending	
2026	18th Gaudí Awards	Best Supporting Actor	Asier Etxeandia	Pending	
2026	18th Gaudí Awards	Best Art Direction	Marta Bazaco	Pending	
2026	18th Gaudí Awards	Best Costume Desig	Mercè Paloma	Pending	
2026	18th Gaudí Awards	Best Visual Effects	Xavi Molas, Oliwia Trybel	Pending	
2026	18th Gaudí Awards	Best Makeup and Hairstyles	Barbara Boucke	Pending	

== See also ==
- List of Spanish films of 2025
