= Away (2025 film) =

- Theatrical release poster
- Catalan: Molt lluny
- Directed by: Gerard Oms
- Written by: Gerard Oms
- Produced by: Carles Torras; Sergio Adrià
- Starring: Mario Casas; David Verdaguer; Ilyass El Ouahdani; Jetty Mathurin; Hanneke van der Paardt; Reinout de Vey Mestdagh; Raúl Prieto; Nausicaa Bonnín
- Cinematography: Edu Canet Ciscar
- Edited by: Neus Ballús
- Music by: Sílvia Pérez Cruz
- Production companies: Zabriskie Films; Revolver Amsterdam
- Distributed by: BTeam Pictures
- Release dates: 16 March 2025 (Málaga); 11 April 2025 (Spain)
- Countries: Spain; Netherlands
- Language: Catalan

Away (Catalan: Molt lluny) is a 2025 drama film directed by Gerard Oms (in his feature film directorial debut). It stars Mario Casas alongside David Verdaguer and Ilyass El Ouahdani.

Set against the backdrop of the 2008 crisis, the plot explores the plight of a thirty-something Spaniard living in Utrecht (Casas), facing precariousness, racism, and classism while learning to reconcile with his queer identity. Away premiered at the 28th Málaga Film Festival on 16 March 2025, ahead of its 11 April 2025 theatrical debut in Spain by BTeam Pictures.

== Plot ==
Sergio, a RCD Espanyol supporter, travels to Utrecht in 2008 to attend a football fixture. Instead of returning home, he feels the sudden urge to stay there, feigning a panic attack and starting a process for finding himself.

== Cast ==
- Mario Casas as Sergio
- David Verdaguer as Manel
- Ilyass El Ouahdani as Yusuf
- Jetty Mathurin
- Hanneke van der Paardt
- Reinout de Vey Mestdagh
- Raúl Prieto as Miguel
- Nausicaa Bonnín
- Marcus Kluck

== Production ==
Away is the directorial debut film of Gerard Oms, Mario Casas' acting coach since Cross the Line, who described the film as a 'late coming-of-age' story. Oms also acknowledged the film to chiefly deal with his own life experiences, primarily deviating from them in the beginning, with the presentation of the protagonist within the football environment. The film is a Spanish-Dutch co-production of Zabriskie Films alongside Revolver Amsterdam. It had the participation of TV3 and RTVE and the backing from Creative Europe MEDIA, ICEC, ICAA and NL Film Fonds.

To prepare for his role, Casas took lessons in contemporary dance for a month, and also took roles of repressed men such as those portrayed by Heath Ledger in Brokeback Mountain, Josh O'Connor in God's Own Country, and Matthias Schoenaerts in Rust and Bone as references.

== Release ==
Latido Films acquired sales rights to Away ahead of its world premiere. The film was presented at the 28th Málaga Film Festival on 16 March 2025. It was also selected as the closing film of the 15th D'A Barcelona Film Festival. It was released theatrically in Spain on 11 April 2025 by BTeam Pictures.

Its festival run also included a selection in the Ibero-American Fiction Feature Section of the 40th Guadalajara International Film Festival.

== Reception ==
Enric Albero of El Cultural deemed Casas' performance to be his best since Unit 7.

Raquel Hernández Luján of HobbyConsolas gave the film 70 points ('good') highlighting "the depth of the script's exploration of its central character" while warning that Away is a "gray, cold and sad film that does not make it easy for the viewer".

Carlos Boyero of El País wrote that Oms' storytelling "is intelligent and honest, showing an unkind reality, doing so with subtlety and verisimilitude", also predicting that the Dardenne Brothers would deem Oms to be an excellent disciple of theirs.

Roger Salvans of Fotogramas rated the film 4 out of 5 stars, highlighting Casas' commitment and the potential that can be sensed in Oms.

== Accolades ==
Year	Award	Category	Nominee(s)	Result	Ref.
2025	28th Málaga Film Festival	Silver Biznaga for Best Actor	Mario Casas	Won	
2025	28th Málaga Film Festival	Silver Biznaga (Critics Jury's Special Prize)		Won	
2025	40th Guadalajara International Film Festival	Best Debut Film (Ibero-American Fiction Film competition)		Won	
2025	31st Forqué Awards	Best Actor in a Film	Mario Casas	Nominated	
2026	13th Feroz Awards	Best Main Actor in a Film	Mario Casas	Nominated	
2026	13th Feroz Awards	Best Film Poster	Dan Petris, Jaume Caldés	Nominated	
2026	18th Gaudí Awards	Best Film		Nominated	
2026	18th Gaudí Awards	Best New Director	Gerard Oms	Nominated	
2026	18th Gaudí Awards	Best Original Screenplay	Gerard Oms	Nominated	
2026	18th Gaudí Awards	Best Actor	Mario Casas	Won	
2026	18th Gaudí Awards	Best Editing	Neus Ballús	Nominated	
2026	40th Goya Awards	Best New Director	Gerard Oms	Nominated	
2026	40th Goya Awards	Best Actor	Mario Casas	Nominated	
2026	34th Actors and Actresses Union Awards	Best Film Actor in a Leading Role	Mario Casas	Nominated	

== See also ==
- List of Spanish films of 2025
