= My Friend Eva =

- Theatrical release poster
- Spanish: Mi amiga Eva
- Directed by: Cesc Gay
- Screenplay by: Cesc Gay; Eduard Sola
- Produced by: Marta Esteban; Laia Bosch
- Starring: Nora Navas; Juan Diego Botto; Rodrigo de la Serna
- Cinematography: Andreu Rebés
- Edited by: Liana Artigal
- Music by: Arnau Bataller
- Production companies: Imposible Films; Alexfilm AIE
- Distributed by: Filmax
- Release date: 19 September 2025
- Country: Spain
- Languages: Spanish; Catalan

My Friend Eva (Spanish: Mi amiga Eva) is a 2025 Spanish comedy film directed by Cesc Gay from a screenplay that he co-wrote with Eduard Sola. It stars Nora Navas as the title character alongside Rodrigo de la Serna and Juan Diego Botto.

== Plot ==
While in Rome, 50-year-old Eva realizes her yearning for falling in love again, and so she starts a new life as a single person back in Barcelona.

== Cast ==
- Nora Navas as Eva
- Juan Diego Botto as Víctor
- Rodrigo de la Serna as Álex
- Àgata Roca as Cris
- Francesco Carril as Dani
- Marian Álvarez as Marga
- Fernanda Orazi as Raquel
- Miki Esparbé as Julián
- Lluís Villanueva as Raúl
- Mercedes Sampietro as Madre Eva
- Mariona Pagés as Marina (hija Eva)
- Martí Ribot as Teo (hijo Eva)

== Production ==
The film is an Imposible Films and Alexfilm AIE production. It had the pàrticipation of RTVE, Movistar Plus+, and 3Cat and backing from ICAA. Shooting locations included Barcelona, Badalona, La Garriga, and Rome.

== Release ==
Distributed by Filmax, My Friend Eva is scheduled to be released theatrically in Spain on 19 September 2025. It was included in the 'Made of Spain' lineup of the 73rd San Sebastián International Film Festival. After acquiring global distribution rights, Filmax likewise sold the film in Italy (Teodora Film), Germany and Austria (Neue Visionen), Israel (Lev Cinemas), Greece (Cinobo), Bulgaria (Beta Films), and former Yugoslavia (Cinemania).

== Reception ==
Begoña Piña of Cinemanía rated the film 4 out of 5 stars, deeming it to be "agile, fun, smart, and at times moving".

Raquel Hernández Luján of HobbyConsolas gave the film 75 points ('good'), citing Navas' performance and the central premise as the best things about the film.

Carlos Boyero of El País declared himself to be "not distracted at any point from what they do and say in this film".

Laura Pérez of Fotogramas rated the film 4 out of 5 stars, considering that Navas envelopes Eva's character with a tenderness and truth comparable to those of Ricardo Darín and Javier Cámara in Truman.

Carmen L. Lobo of La Razón rated the film 4 out of 5 stars, extolling how Navas "is truly splendid in this beautiful, solid, and humane story".

== Accolades ==
Year	Award	Category	Nominee(s)	Result	Ref.
2025	31st Forqué Awards	Best Actress in a Film	Nora Navas	Nominated	
2026	13th Feroz Awards	Best Comedy Film		Nominated	
2026	13th Feroz Awards	Best Main Actress in a Film	Nora Navas	Nominated	
2026	18th Gaudí Awards	Best Original Screenplay	Cesc Gay, Eduard Sola	Won	
2026	18th Gaudí Awards	Best Actress	Nora Navas	Nominated	
2026	81st CEC Medals	Best Actress	Nora Navas	Nominated	
2026	40th Goya Awards	Best Actress	Nora Navas	Nominated	
2026	9th ALMA Awards	Best Screenplay in a Comedy Film	Cesc Gay, Eduard Sola	Nominated	

== See also ==
- List of Spanish films of 2025
