= Balandrau, Where the Fierce Wind Blew =

- Theatrical release poster
- Catalan: Balandrau, vent salvatge
- Directed by: Fernando Trullols
- Written by: Danielle Schleif
- Based on: 3 nits de Torb i 1 cap d'any by Jordi Cruz
- Produced by: Tono Folguera; Guille Cascante; Danielle Schleif
- Starring: Álvaro Cervantes; Marc Martínez; Bruna Cusí; Eduardo Lloveras; Anna Moliner; Pep Ambrós; Jan Buxaderas; Àgata Roca; Francesc Garrido
- Cinematography: Miquel Prohens
- Edited by: Ana Charte Isa
- Music by: Arnau Bataller
- Production companies: Lastor Media; Vilaüt Films; Goroka Content; Balandrau Films AIE
- Distributed by: Filmax
- Release date: 20 February 2026
- Running time: 116 minutes
- Country: Spain
- Language: Catalan

Balandrau, Where the Fierce Wind Blew (Catalan: Balandrau, vent salvatge) is a 2026 survival drama film directed by Fernando Trullols and written by Danielle Schleif based on the book 3 nits de Torb i 1 cap d'any by Jordi Cruz. It stars Álvaro Cervantes, Bruna Cusí, and Marc Martínez.

== Plot ==
Based on actual events, the plot follows a group of mountaineers climbing the Balandrau peak on 30 December 2000. They are caught in one of the worst storms ever in the Pyrenees.

== Cast ==
- Álvaro Cervantes as Josep Maria
- Marc Martínez as Siscu
- Bruna Cusí as Mònica
- Anna Moliner as Elena
- Pep Ambrós as Pep
- Eduardo Lloveras as Oriol
- Jan Buxaderas as Bernat
- Francesc Garrido as Artur
- Àgata Roca as Matilde

== Production ==
The film is a Lastor Media, Vilaüt Films, Goroka Contents, and Balandrau Films AIE production. Shooting locations in Catalonia included La Vall de Boí and Camprodon.

== Release ==
Distributed by Filmax, the film was released theatrically in Spain on 20 February 2026.

== Reception ==
Toni Vall of Cinemanía rated the film 3 out of 5 stars, assessing that Trullols "make the most of the [available] technical resources" "especially in the excellent final twenty minutes".

Carmen L. Lobo of La Razón gave the film a 3-star rating, highlighting "the onset of the fierce storm, very well directed and terrifyingly spectacular" as the best thing about the film.

== See also ==
- List of Spanish films of 2026
