= Another Man (film) =

- Theatrical release poster
- Catalan: Un altre home
- Directed by: David Moragas
- Screenplay by: David Moragas
- Produced by: Antonio Chavarrías; Alba Bosch Duran; Mónica Lozano
- Starring: Lluís Marqués; Quim Àvila; Bruna Cusí
- Cinematography: Juli Carné Martorell
- Edited by: Alba Cid
- Music by: Clara Peya
- Production companies: Oberon Media; Monstro Films; Un altre home AIE
- Distributed by: Filmax
- Release dates: November 2025 (Thessaloniki); 27 March 2026 (Spain)
- Countries: Spain; Mexico
- Language: Catalan

Another Man (Catalan: Un altre home) is a 2025 drama film written and directed by David Moragas. It stars Lluís Marquès, Quim Àvila, and Bruna Cusí.

== Plot ==
The couple formed by graphic designer Marc and his boyfriend Eudald, both living in an apartment in Sant Antoni, is disrupted upon the arrival of a new neighbor eliciting attention from Marc. Meanwhile, Marc's sister Marta deals with her own couple vicissitudes.

== Cast ==
- Lluís Marquès as Marc
- Quim Àvila as Eudald
- Bruna Cusí as Marta

== Production ==
The film is a Spanish-Mexican co-production by Oberon Media, Monstro Films, and Un altre home AIE, with the collaboration of 3Cat. Shooting locations included Barcelona.

== Release ==
The film had its world premiere in the 'Meet the Neighbors' international competition of the 66th Thessaloniki International Film Festival. It was also presented at the 29th Málaga Film Festival. Distributed by Filmax, it was released theatrically in Spain on 27 March 2026.

The film later won the Ottavio Mai Award for Best Feature Film and the Young Lovers – Libere Gabbie Award at the 41st Lovers Film Festival in Turin.

== Reception ==
Savina Petkova of Cineuropa wrote that despite it is clear the director cares for his characters, "the mess is simply not enough and the tangles of desire too loose".

Boyd van Hoeij of ScreenDaily underscored that the film "serves up a slice of queer life in an intentionally down-to-earth way".

Sergi Sánchez of La Razón rated the film 4 out of 5 stars singling out "its keen eye for detail, and its shrewdness in portraying emotional ambiguity" as the best things about the film.

María Adell Carmona of Ara rated the film 3 out of 5 stars, praising Moragas' natural talent when writing couple scenes, but finding other storylines such the one involving the sister to be less accomplished, giving a sense of unbalance to the whole.

== See also ==
- List of Spanish films of 2026
