= Another Man =

Another Man may refer to:

- Another Man (magazine), an international fashion and culture menswear biannual magazine
- Another Man (film), a 2025 drama film
