= Gemma Blasco =

Spanish film director and screenwriter (born 1993)

- Blasco in 2026
- Born: 1993 (age 32–33); Barcelona, Spain
- Occupations: Film director; screenwriter

Gemma Blasco (born 1993) is a Spanish film director and screenwriter who made short films and the experimental feature El zoo (2018) before co-writing and directing Fury (2025), which premiered at South by Southwest and earned her the Gaudí Award for Best New Director and a Goya nomination in the same category. In 2026, she received the Princess of Girona Award for the Arts.

== Early life and training ==
Blasco was born in Barcelona in 1993 and graduated in film directing and screenwriting from Bande à Part in 2014. In 2018, she attended the Character Construction workshop at the Escuela Internacional de Cine y Televisión in San Antonio de los Baños, Cuba, where she developed the synopsis for Fury; she also attended Filming in Barcelona with Abbas Kiarostami.

== Career ==
=== Short films and El zoo ===
Blasco's Formas de jugar shared the 2015 Noves Visions Best Short Film Award with Alice Waddington's Disco Inferno at the Sitges Film Festival. Her short Jauría premiered in the official section of the 2018 Málaga Film Festival. Blasco then won the New Authorship Award for Best Direction at Sitges for Jauría and premiered her first feature, the experimental El zoo, adapted from the play Captius, at the 2018 Gijón International Film Festival. El zoo follows a group of actors preparing a play about a reality show, as the boundary between their lives and their characters dissolves.

=== Fury ===
Blasco began writing Fury in 2018, and it became her first fiction feature. Co-written with Eva Pauné, the film had its world premiere at South by Southwest in Austin, screened at the 28th Málaga Film Festival and was released in Spain on 28 March 2025. Set in the year after Alex, a young actress played by Ángela Cervantes, is raped at a New Year's Eve party, the film follows her isolation and the response of her brother Adrián, played by Àlex Monner, while she channels her anger through the role of Medea. Blasco said the film grew out of her own sexual assault at 18 and her wish to explore the darkness of the traumatic process through fiction.

Reviewing the film for El País, Elsa Fernández-Santos praised Blasco's decision to present the rape as a black screen with sound and Cervantes's performance, but found the repeated blood and viscera imagery excessive. At Málaga, Fury won awards for Cervantes's performance, Monner's supporting performance and Didac Palou and Tomás López's editing. It also opened the 2025 D'A Film Festival and received a special mention at the first SXSW London. Later in 2025, it was selected for the Made in Spain programme at the San Sebastián International Film Festival and for the International Film Festival of India in Goa.

=== Later work ===
In September 2025, Blasco served on the jury of the RTVE Another Look Award at the 73rd San Sebastián International Film Festival. She teaches acting and has developed a new feature, Petroli, during a Faberllull residency; its story follows Marc's partner and best friend after he dies in an oil refinery explosion. In 2026, she continued writing the project at the Catalan Film Academy's screenwriting residency.

== Awards ==
Blasco received the El futuro es mujer award at the 2025 Días de Cine Awards. At the 18th Gaudí Awards in 2026, she won Best New Director for Fury and was nominated with Pauné for Best Original Screenplay. She was also nominated for Best New Director at the 40th Goya Awards and the 81st CEC Awards. In 2026, she received the Princess of Girona Award for the Arts.
