= Wolfgang (2025 film) =

- Theatrical release poster
- Catalan: Wolfgang (extraordinari)
- Directed by: Javier Ruiz Caldera
- Screenplay by: Laia Aguilar; Carmen Marfà; Yago Alonso; Valentina Viso
- Based on: Wolfgang (extraordinari) by Laia Aguilar
- Produced by: Marta Sánchez de Miguel; Gerard Verdaguer; Núria Valls; Adrián Guerra; Ghislain Barrois; Álvaro Augustin
- Starring: Miki Esparbé; Jordi Catalán; Àngels Gonyalons; Berto Romero; Anna Castillo
- Cinematography: Sergi Vilanova
- Edited by: Alberto de Toro
- Music by: Clara Peya
- Production companies: Nostromo Pictures; Lo Vi Films; Telecinco Cinema; Wolfgang Película AIE
- Distributed by: Universal Pictures International Spain
- Release date: 14 March 2025
- Country: Spain
- Language: Catalan

Wolfgang (Catalan: Wolfgang (extraordinari)) is a 2025 Spanish comedy-drama film directed by Javier Ruiz Caldera from a screenplay by Laia Aguilar, Carmen Marfà, Yago Alonso, and Valentina Viso based on the novel by Laia Aguilar. It stars Jordi Catalán, Miki Esparbé, Àngels Gonyalons, Berto Romero, and Anna Castillo.

== Plot ==
Upon the sudden death of his mother Ingrid, autistic and high-IQ boy Wolfgang is forced to live with his father Carles. Wolfgang dreams about becoming a master pianist and joining the Grimald Academy in Paris, following on his mother's footsteps.

== Cast ==
- Jordi Catalán as Wolfgang
- Miki Esparbé as Carles
- Àngels Gonyalons
- Anna Castillo as Mia
- Berto Romero as Paco
- Nausicaa Bonnín as Ingrid

Carlos Cuevas and J.A. Bayona appear in cameo roles playing themselves.

== Production ==
The film is a Nostromo Pictures, Lo Vi Films, Telecinco Cinema, and Wolfgang Película AIE production, and it had the co-production of 3Cat, and the participation of Mediaset España, Movistar Plus+ and Mediterráneo Mediaset España Group. It was shot in Paris and Barcelona.

== Release ==
The film was released theatrically in Spain on 14 March 2025 by Universal Pictures in 346 theatres. It finished first in its opening weekend with €657,000 and 91,700 admissions.

== Reception ==
Pablo Vázquez of Fotogramas rated the film 3 out of 5 stars, praising its honest "crowd-pleasing" tidiness and [the use of] Carlos Cuevas as running gag.

Quim Casas of El Periódico de Catalunya rated the film 3 out of 5 stars, describing it as "a careful attempt at making dramatic and popular cinema in Catalan".

Bavner Donaldo, an Indonesian film critic of Cinejour, rated the film 3.4 out of 5 stars, describing it as a simple yet moving family drama, praising its honest and unforced approach to grief and fatherhood.

== Accolades ==
Year	Award	Category	Nominee(s)	Result	Ref.
2026	13th Feroz Awards	Best Comedy Film		Nominated	
2026	18th Gaudí Awards	Best Original Score	Clara Peya	Nominated	
2026	81st CEC Medals	Best New Actor	Jordi Catalán	Nominated	

== See also ==
- List of Spanish films of 2025
