= Fury (2025 film) =

- Theatrical release poster
- Spanish: La furia
- Directed by: Gemma Blasco
- Screenplay by: Gemma Blasco; Eva Pauné
- Produced by: Mireia Graell Vivancos
- Starring: Ángela Cervantes; Àlex Monner
- Cinematography: Neus Ollé
- Edited by: Dídac Palou
- Music by: Jona Hamann
- Production company: Ringo Media
- Distributed by: Filmax
- Release dates: 8 March 2025 (SXSW); 28 March 2025 (Spain)
- Country: Spain
- Languages: Spanish; Catalan

Fury (Spanish: La furia) is a 2025 Spanish drama film directed by Gemma Blasco. It stars Ángela Cervantes and Àlex Monner.

== Plot ==
After being raped in New Year's Eve, actress Alexandra channels her pain through theatre in a play of Medea while her brother Adrián deals with anger for having failed to protect his sister.

== Cast ==
- Ángela Cervantes as Alexandra
- Àlex Monner as Adrián
- Ana Torrent
- Carla Linares
- Eli Iranzo
- Salim Daprincee
- Pau Escobar
- Victoria Rivero

== Production ==
Produced by Ringo Media, the film had the participation of RTVE, 3Cat, Aragón TV, and Filmin, and the backing from ICAA, the Government of Aragon, and ICEC.

== Release ==
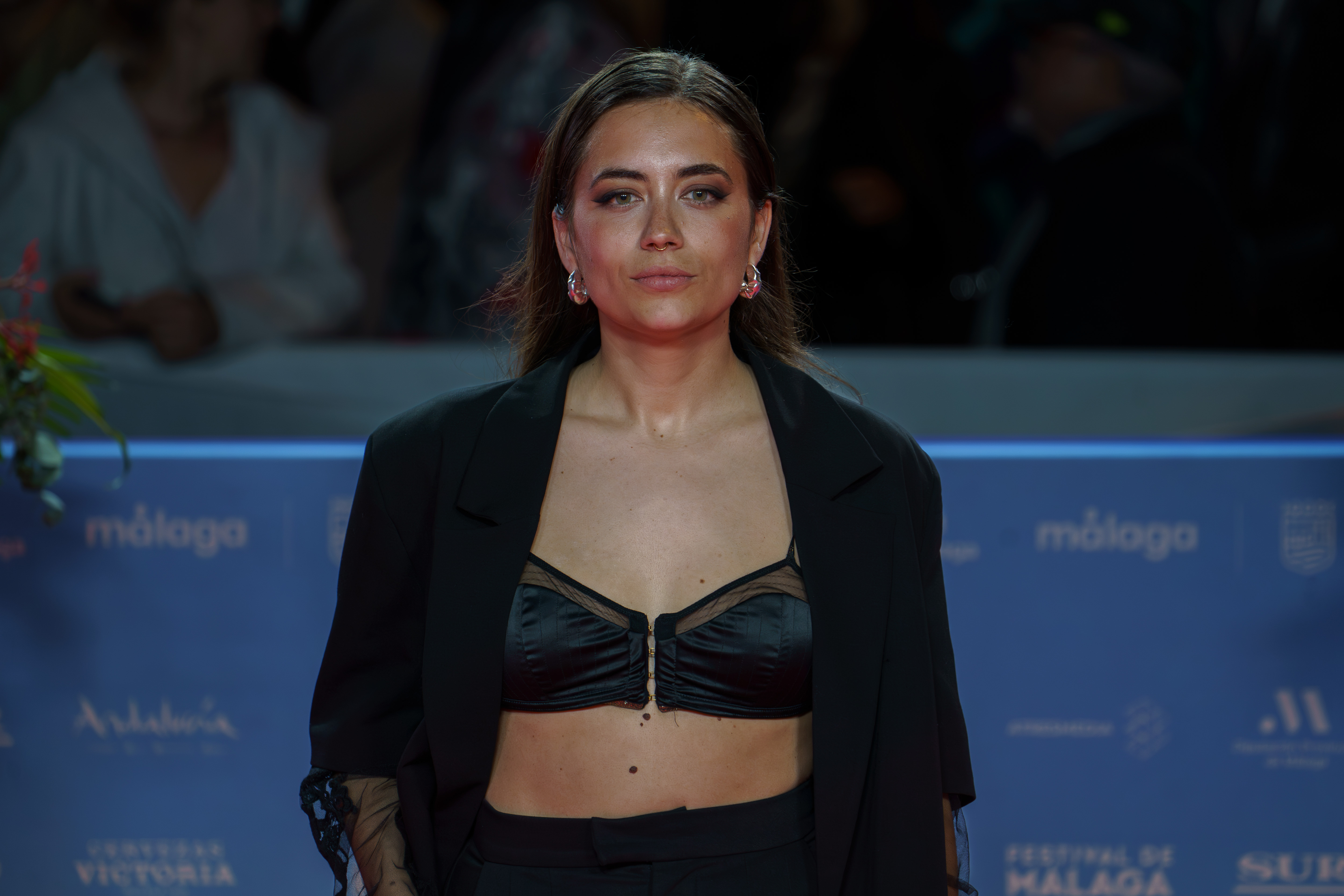
Blasco attending the red carpet of the 28th Málaga Film Festival in March 2025

Fury had its world premiere at the 2025 South by Southwest Film & TV Festival. It also made it to the main competition slate of the 28th Málaga Film Festival (for its Spanish premiere) and to the programme of the Miami Film Festival. It was also selected for a 27 March 2025 screening as the opening film of the D'A Film Festival for its Catalan premiere. Distributed by Filmax (that also handled international sales), it is scheduled to be released theatrically in Spain on 28 March 2025.

== Reception ==
Júlia Olmo of Cineuropa declared Fury "a film of unusual strength, a film as devastating as it is powerful and brave".

Raquel Hernández Luján of HobbyConsolas gave the film 78 points ('good') deeming it to be "painfully incisive".

Toni Vall of Cinemanía rated the film 4 out of 5 stars, bringing attention to "a simply extraordinary work" by Cervantes.

Blai Morell of Fotogramas rated the film 3 out 5 stars, mentioning a stunning Ángela Cervantes as the best thing about the film, while citing an overly confusing third act as its worst.

== Accolades ==
| Year | Award | Category | Nominee(s) | Result | Ref. |
|---|---|---|---|---|---|
| 2025 | 28th Málaga Film Festival | Silver Biznaga for Best Actress | Ángela Cervantes | Won | |
| 2025 | 28th Málaga Film Festival | Silver Biznaga for Best Supporting Actor | Àlex Monner | Won | |
| 2025 | 28th Málaga Film Festival | Silver Biznaga for Best Editing | Didac Palou, Tomás López | Won | |
| 2025 | 31st Forqué Awards | Best Actress in a Film | Ángela Cervantes | Nominated | |
| 2026 | 13th Feroz Awards | Best Main Actress in a Film | Ángela Cervantes | Nominated | |
| 2026 | 18th Gaudí Awards | Best New Director | Gemma Blasco | Won | |
| 2026 | 18th Gaudí Awards | Best Original Screenplay | Gemma Blasco, Eva Pauné | Nominated | |
| 2026 | 18th Gaudí Awards | Best Actress | Ángela Cervantes | Won | |
| 2026 | 18th Gaudí Awards | Best Supporting Actress | Carla Linares | Nominated | |
| 2026 | 18th Gaudí Awards | Best Supporting Actor | Àlex Monner | Nominated | |
| 2026 | 18th Gaudí Awards | Best Makeup and Hairstyles | Danae Gatell, Ale Salvat | Nominated | |
| 2026 | 81st CEC Medals | Best New Director | Gemma Blasco | Nominated | |
| 2026 | 40th Goya Awards | Best New Director | Gemma Blasco | Nominated | |
| 2026 | 40th Goya Awards | Best Actress | Ángela Cervantes | Nominated | |

== See also ==
- List of Spanish films of 2025
