= Valenciana (film) =

- Theatrical release poster
- Directed by: Jordi Núñez
- Written by: Jordi Núñez
- Based on: Valenciana by Jordi Casanovas
- Starring: Ángela Cervantes; Tània Fortea; Conchi Espejo; Fernando Guallar; Sandra Cervera
- Cinematography: Daniel Moreno García
- Music by: Isabel Latorre
- Production companies: Pegatum Transmedia; Dacsa Produccions; Àmbar Pictures; Solworks Films
- Distributed by: Carácter Films
- Release dates: 22 June 2024 (Cinema Jove); 18 October 2024 (Spain)
- Country: Spain
- Languages: Catalan; Spanish

Valenciana is a 2024 Spanish drama film written and directed by Jordi Núñez based on the play by Jordi Casanovas starring Ángela Cervantes, Tània Fortea, and Conchi Espejo.

== Plot ==
Set in the 1990s Valencian Community, the plot follows the plight of three journalists and friends: Valèria, Ana, and Encarna; respectively involved in synthetic drug addiction, lurid television shows, and political party communications as they try to salvage their friendship in the meanwhile.

== Cast ==
- Ángela Cervantes as Valèria
- Tània Fortea as Ana
- Conchi Espejo as Encarna
- Fernando Guallar as Ricardo Zamora
- Sandra Cervera as Sonia
- Amparo Fernández as Vicky
- Jorge Silvestre as Kiko
- Jaime Linares as Joaquín

== Production ==
The film is a Pegatum Transmedia, Dacsa Produccions, Àmbar Pictures, and Solworks Films production. It had the participation of TV3, À Punt, IB3, and Filmin and the backing from IVC. It was shot in Valencian (Catalan) and Spanish.

== Release ==
The film premiered on 22 June 2024 at the Cinema Jove-Valencia International Film Festival, where it won the Audience Award. Distributed by Carácter Films, it was scheduled to be released theatrically on 18 October 2024.

== Reception ==
Luis Martínez of El Mundo rated the film 3 out of 5 stars, writing that the result is "a film as feverish as it is irregular, exaggerated and enthusiastic at the same time".

Paula Arantzazu Ruiz of Ara rated the film 2½ out of 5 stars, considering that "Ángela Cervantes, Tania Fortea and especially Conchi Espejo are fabulous" and "support with conviction a film in need, on the other hand, of a much neater directing and editing job".

== Accolades ==
| Year | Award | Category | Nominee(s) | Result | Ref. |
|---|---|---|---|---|---|
| 2025 | 7th Lola Gaos Awards | Best Film | | Nominated | |
| 2025 | 7th Lola Gaos Awards | Best Art Direction | Adrián Suárez de Llano | Won | |
| 2025 | 7th Lola Gaos Awards | Best Original Score | Isabel Latorre Sáez | Won | |
| 2025 | 7th Lola Gaos Awards | Best Original Song | "Reality Is Not Enough" by Jordi Núñez, Jordi Casanovas, Marta Marlo, Andrés Lim | Won | |
| 2025 | 7th Lola Gaos Awards | Best Costume Design | Alex Tarazón | Nominated | |
| 2025 | 7th Lola Gaos Awards | Best Makeup and Hairstyles | Verónica Baeza, Amparo Carrió | Won | |

== See also ==
- List of Spanish films of 2024
