= Night Tales =

- Theatrical release poster
- Spanish: Rumbos
- Directed by: Manuela Burló Moreno
- Written by: Manuela Burló Moreno
- Produced by: Ibon Cormenzana; Ignasi Estapé; Mikel Lejarza; Mercedes Gamero
- Starring: Karra Elejalde; Pilar López de Ayala; Carmen Machi; Ernesto Alterio; Miki Esparbé; Nora Navas; Fernando Albizu; Rafa Ordorika; Emilio Palacios; Christopher Torres
- Production companies: Arcadia Motion Pictures; Jano Pictures AIE
- Distributed by: Sony Pictures
- Release dates: 24 April 2016 (Málaga); 10 June 2016 (Spain)
- Running time: 93 minutos
- Country: Spain
- Language: Spanish

Night Tales (Spanish: Rumbos) is a 2016 Spanish comedy-drama film written and directed by Manuela Burló Moreno. It features an ensemble cast that includes Karra Elejalde, Pilar López de Ayala, Carmen Machi, Ernesto Alterio, Miki Esparbé, Nora Navas, Fernando Albizu, Rafa Ordorika, Emilio Palacios, and Christopher Torres.

== Plot ==
Set in a hot Summer night in Barcelona, the plot follows crossed love vignettes involving people in six vehicles.

== Cast ==
- Pilar López de Ayala as Lucía
- Miki Esparbé as Iván
- Karra Elejalde as Pedro
- Emilio Palacios as Koke
- Christopher Torres as Luisito
- Fernando Albizu as Paco
- Carmen Machi as Lupe
- Ernesto Alterio as Alberto
- Rafa Ordorika

== Production ==
The film was produced by Arcadia Motion Pictures and Jano Pictures AIE, in association with Atresmedia Cine, and with the participation of Movistar+. Shooting locations included Barcelona and Navarre.

== Release ==
The film was presented at the 19th Málaga Film Festival on 24 April 2016. Distributed by Sony Pictures Releasing de España, it was released theatrically in Spain on 10 June 2016.

== Reception ==
Mirito Torreiro of Fotogramas rated the film 3 out of 5 stars, highlighting the nearly entire cast as the best thing about the film, while citing the feel of déjà vu left by the denouement as a negative point.

Jordi Costa of El País wrote that the "actors shine, but as jet engines crammed into a second-hand utility vehicle and condemned to run through clichés".

== See also ==
- List of Spanish films of 2016
