= Magalí Sare =

Catalan singer and multi-instrumentalist

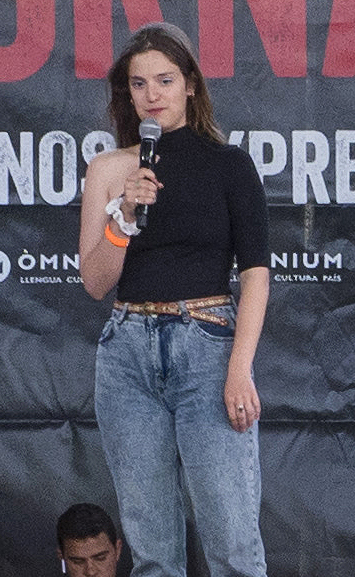
- Sare performing in 2019
- Born: Magalí Sesé i Lara; July 28, 1991 (age 34); Barcelona, Catalonia
- Occupations: Singer, multi-instrumentalist
- Years active: 2012–present

Magalí Sesé i Lara (born 28 July 1991), known professionally as Magalí Sare, is a Catalan singer and multi-instrumentalist, born into a family of musicians. She obtained the professional degree in transverse flute and lyrical singing at the Conservatori Municipal de Sabadell, where she also studied piano and percussion. At the age of nineteen, she began a higher degree in classical flute at the Liceu Conservatory of Music but completed only two years, deciding to focus on modern music and jazz instead.

== Musical career ==
In 2012, Sare joined the vocal a cappella group Quartet Mèlt as the soprano voice, performing across Catalonia and Europe. With the group, she released two albums: Maletes (2016) and Xarrampim! (2017). Quartet Mèlt gained wide recognition after winning the third season (2015) of the TV3 show Oh Happy Day.

In 2017, she graduated in jazz singing from the Liceu Conservatory, receiving the department's extraordinary award. During her studies, she formed a duo with guitarist Sebastià Gris, with whom she won two awards: the first prize in Jazz from the Juventudes Musicales de España competition (2018), and the first international prize at the Suns Europe competition for minority languages (2019).

In April 2018, she self-released her first solo album, Cançons d'amor i dimonis (Songs of Love and Demons). That same year she collaborated with Clara Peya on the album Estómac, while continuing to perform with Quartet Mèlt until 2021, when she was permanently replaced by Carolina Alabau (who had occasionally substituted for her since 2019).

In 2019, Sare was nominated as an emerging talent at the Premis Alícia of the Acadèmia Catalana de la Música, and as breakthrough artist at the Premis ARC. That same year, the poem Desplegar-se by Sònia Moya, set to music by Sare, was among the five best musical adaptations of the year at the Terra i Cultura contest, receiving a special mention from Lluís Llach.

Since then, Sare has participated in several musical projects, notably two duos: one with guitarist Sebastià Gris, with whom she released A Boy and a Girl (2020), and another with New York-based double bassist Manel Fortià. In addition to performing, Sare teaches modern and jazz singing and combo at the Taller de Músics’ higher education program.

== Discography ==
With Quartet Mèlt

- Maletes (2016)
- Xarrampim! (2017)

Solo

- Cançons d'amor i dimonis (2018)
- Esponja (2022)

Other collaborations

- Estómac – Clara Peya (2018), featuring Sare on vocals
- Fang i núvols – Magalí Sare & Manel Fortià (2020)
- A Boy & A Girl – Magalí Sare & Sebastià Gris (2020)
- El disc de la Marató 2022 (2022) – song "La petita rambla del Poble-sec" with Maruja Limón and Las Migas
- ReTornar – Magalí Sare & Manel Fortià (2023)

== Awards ==
- 2017 – Extraordinary Prize, Jazz Department (Liceu Conservatory)
- 2018 – First Prize in Jazz (Juventudes Musicales de España)
- 2019 – First International Prize (Suns Europe)
