= The Fantastic Golem Affairs =

- Theatrical release poster
- Spanish: El fantástico caso del Golem
- Directed by: Burnin' Percebes
- Written by: Burnin' Percebes
- Produced by: Pedro Hernández Santos; Roberto Butragueño
- Starring: Brays Efe; Bruna Cusí; Luis Tosar; Anna Castillo; Javier Botet; Tito Valverde; Roger Coma; Nao Albet; Roberto Álamo
- Cinematography: Ion de Sosa
- Edited by: Juliana Montañés
- Music by: Sergio Bertran
- Production companies: Aquí y Allí Films; Sideral
- Release dates: 15 March 2023 (Málaga); 16 June 2023 (Spain)
- Country: Spain
- Language: Spanish

The Fantastic Golem Affairs (Spanish: El fantástico caso del Golem) is a 2023 Spanish absurdist science fiction comedy film written and directed by Burnin' Percebes (Fernando Martínez and Juan González) which stars Brays Efe. It also features Bruna Cusí, Luis Tosar, Anna Castillo, Javier Botet, Tito Valverde, Roger Coma, Nao Albet, and Roberto Álamo.

The plot follows Juan (Efe), a guy trying to unravel the mystery behind his best friend being shattered into pieces as if he were made of porcelain after falling from a roof.

The film world premiered at the 26th Málaga Film Festival on 15 March 2023 ahead of its Spanish theatrical release on 16 June 2023.

== Plot ==
Two male friends are playing a guess-the-movie game on a rooftop. After guessing two rounds (The Shining and Alive), one of the friends gets naked in the third round, starts mimicking a monkey and falls from the roof, shattering into pieces on a car. The surviving friend attends the funeral of the shattered man (David) alongside his dad and a woman working for him, Clara. After being left alone, the surviving friend is handed the bill for the funerary services. The surviving friend, presented as Juan Martínez, testifies to a couple of police agents about the incident. Back to his bed, Juan asks in social media if someone has experienced something similar to their best friend being shattered into pieces. Next morning, Juan receives an insurance company worker who tells him that he is responsible for the damage to the vehicle David crashed onto. An online post by a woman named Maria Pons answered Juan's online plea by telling that she has experienced the shattering of someone too. Juan visits David's friend Filtro. After having a sexual misunderstanding, Filtro angrily tells Juan that every possession of David is now registered to Juan's name. Juan's dad and Clara visit the company DEP with other funeral attendees, and they are explained that the death algorithm is broken and now every person is being assigned the same death by piano crushing.

Juan dates Maria, and after Maria tells the story about her stepfather's shattering hand, they have sex. Juan leaves Maria's apartment and catches the couple of purported police agents spying on him. Filtro and his lawyer visit Juan to pressure him into changing David's will to their favour, unsuccessfully. When Maria is about to tell Juan more about her shattered stepfather in their second date, she dies by piano crushing. After the two purported police agents (Carlos and Roger) assault Juan's apartment, Juan hits Roger, who immediately shatters into pieces. Juan takes the unconscious Carlos to the Golem Solutions S.L headquarters in Madrid, where he is told by a company official (Carlos' father) that their business is the manufacturing of companion golems, and that David was a golem commissioned by Juan's father. The company official then dies by piano crushing. Juan meets with Clara, herself involved with the piano-throwing company (DEP), which was efficiently managed by David and which is now in shambles after his death. She asks Juan to talk to his father. Juan's dad tells Juan that he commissioned David for Juan when Juan was a child because Juan seemed to be a complete duffer. He also tells his son that pursuant to the company tradition, Juan needs to kill him.

Upon getting acquainted with Carlos (and Carlos pulling an unsuccessful sexual advance on Juan), Juan proposes the recreation of David to Clara. Juan and Clara date and have sex. Filtro, his lawyer, Juan, and Clara (now Juan's lawyer) agree on splitting David's inheritance. Juan, Clara, and Carlos agree on Juan gifting a majority share of DEP to Clara, on Juan joining Golem Solutions as an associate to Carlos, and Carlos building another David. Upon meeting new David and Clara at the DEP offices and during a business travel by train to Zaragoza, Juan's dad dies a satisfactory death by throat slicing. Juan, Clara, David, and Carlos meet at the funeral of Juan's dad (Toni).

== Cast ==
- Brays Efe as Juan
- Bruna Cusí as Clara
- Luis Tosar as Toni
- Anna Castillo as María
- Javier Botet as Carlos
- Tito Valverde as Gustavo
- Roger Coma as Roger
- Nao Albet as Filtro Valencia
- Roberto Álamo
- David Menéndez as David

== Production ==
The premise of the film originates from a scene of Top Secret! in which a German soldier shatters into ceramic pieces upon falling from a turret. According to the helmers, the film also owes a great deal of influence to José Luis Cuerda's work. It also pays tribute to The Room.

An Aquí y Allí Films and Sideral production, the film was shot in Madrid. It was lensed by Ion de Sosa. Shooting began on 17 August 2022.

== Release ==
The film was presented at the 26th Málaga Film Festival on 15 March 2023. It also screened as the opening film of the 29th FANT, the Fantasy Film Festival of Bilbao, in May 2023. It was released theatrically in Spain on 16 June 2023. The film made its North-American premiere at the Fantasia International Film Festival on 22 July 2023. It made it to film slate of the 2023 Fantastic Fest for its U.S. premiere. Gluon Media acquired North American distribution rights to the film.

== Reception ==
Júlia Olmo of Cineuropa considered that Burnin' Percebes "achieve one of the best things in fiction. They make this story believable and enjoyable beyond its possibility in real life".

Matías G. Rebolledo of La Razón deemed the film to be the most original and radical proposal from the Málaga Film Festival, pointing out that the leaning on Cusí's character ("the film's safety valve") throughout the final act saves the film from repetition.

Quim Casas of El Periódico de Catalunya rated the film 3 out of 5 stars, pointing out that the helmers manage to build "something similar to absurd humor sketches" "following a thriller storyline that leads to a very particular aesthetics and a humorous study of human stupidity".

Ricardo Rosado of Fotogramas rated the film 4 out of 5 stars, considering that Burnin' Percebes underscore "their innate ability to make us dream with the necessary surrealist costumbrismo" otherwise highlighting the collaboration between the helmers and cinematographer Ion de Sosa as the best thing about the film.

=== Top ten lists ===
The film appeared on a number of critics' top ten lists of the best Spanish films of 2023:

- 10th — El Periódico de Catalunya (critics)

== See also ==
- List of Spanish films of 2023
