= Truce(s) =

- Film poster
- Spanish: Tregua(s)
- Directed by: Mario Hernández
- Screenplay by: Mario Hernández
- Starring: Salva Reina; Bruna Cusí
- Cinematography: Alex Bokhari
- Edited by: Dani Aránega
- Production companies: Godello Entertainment; Producciones La Cochera; Sierra Gador Producciones; The Lobby
- Distributed by: Syldavia Cinema
- Release dates: 11 March 2023 (Málaga); 22 September 2023 (Spain)
- Country: Spain
- Language: Spanish

Truce(s) (Spanish: Tregua(s)) is a 2023 drama film written and directed by Mario Hernández which stars Salva Reina and Bruna Cusí.

== Plot ==
The plot tracks the long-running closeted relationship between actress Ara and screenwriter Edu, who meet up again during the Málaga Film Festival.

== Cast ==
- Salva Reina as Edu
- Bruna Cusí as Ara
- Abril Montilla as Silvia
- José Fernández as David
- Marta Méndez as Alicia

== Production ==
Tregua(s) is a Godello Entertainment, Producciones La Cochera, Sierra Gador Producciones, and The Lobby production. Shooting locations included Málaga and Madrid.

== Release ==
The film had its world premiere at the 26th Málaga Film Festival, being presented on 11 March 2023. Its festival run also included screenings at the Ibicine Ibiza Festival, and the Alicante Film Festival. Distributed by Syldavia, it was released theatrically in Spain on 22 September 2023.

== Reception ==
Sergio F. Pinilla of Cinemanía rated the film 3 out of 5 stars, underscoring it to be a "promising debut, with Bruna Cusí and Salva Reina in a state of grace".

== Accolades ==
| Year | Award | Category | Nominee(s) | Result | Ref. |
|---|---|---|---|---|---|
| 2024 | 3rd Carmen Awards | Best Actor | Salva Reina | Nominated | |

== See also ==
- List of Spanish films of 2023
