= Join Me for Breakfast =

- Theatrical release poster
- Catalan: Esmorza amb mi
- Directed by: Iván Morales
- Written by: Iván Morales; Almudena Monzó
- Based on: Esmorza amb mi (play) by Iván Morales
- Produced by: Miriam Porté; Àngels Masclans; Roger Torras
- Starring: Anna Alarcón; Iván Massagué; Álvaro Cervantes; Marina Salas; Oriol Pla
- Cinematography: Agnès Piqué Corbera
- Edited by: Jaume Martí
- Music by: Lia Kali; Nora Haddad Casadevall; Nara Is Neus
- Production companies: Distinto Films; Dos Soles Media; WKND
- Distributed by: Filmax
- Release dates: 16 March 2025 (Málaga); 12 June 2025 (Spain)
- Country: Spain
- Language: Catalan

Join Me for Breakfast (Catalan: Esmorza amb mi) is a 2025 Spanish drama film directed by Iván Morales based on his own play. It stars Anna Alarcón, Iván Massagué, Álvaro Cervantes, and Marina Salas.

The film world premiered at the 28th Málaga Film Festival ahead of its 12 June 2025 theatrical release in Spain by Filmax.

== Plot ==
Natàlia, a single mother shooting a documentary about the lack of affection in El Raval, ends up in a wheel chair due to an accident, coming across her former friend Salva (a drug trafficker turned nurse), Salva's partner Carlota (a woman coming back from a period of excesses), and Omar (a musician undergoing a creative crisis seeking out a living with advertising jingles).

== Cast ==
- Anna Alarcón as Natàlia
- Iván Massagué as Salva
- Marina Salas as Carlota
- Álvaro Cervantes as Omar
- Oriol Pla as Magma

== Production ==
The film is a Distinto Films, Medina Vilalta & Partners, WKND, Dos Soles Media, and Tartar Films production. Shooting locations included Barcelona and Terrassa.

== Release ==
The film premiered in the 'Zonazine' section of the 28th Málaga Film Festival on 16 March 2025. It also screened at the D'A Film Festival Barcelona. Distributed by Filmax, it was released theatrically in Spain on 12 June 2025.

== Reception ==
Javier Ocaña of El País positively mentioned that the film confirmed the "estimable" average level of recent Spanish film debuts, even if sometimes its physical and verbal exaggerations somewhat blurry its delicacy.

Begoña Piña of Cinemanía rated the film 3 out of 5 stars, declaring it a story that is easy to empathize with.

Jordi Batlle Caminal of Fotogramas rated the film 3 out of 5 stars, positively citing the "phenomenal" performances delivered by the cast while citing the "weak" subplot pertaining Cervantes' character as a negative point.

== Accolades ==
Year	Award	Category	Nominee(s)	Result	Ref.
2026	18th Gaudí Awards	Best Film		Pending	
2026	18th Gaudí Awards	Best New Director	Iván Morales	Pending	
2026	18th Gaudí Awards	Best Adapted Screenplay	Iván Morales, Almudena Monzó	Pending	
2026	18th Gaudí Awards	Best Actor	Álvaro Cervantes	Pending	
2026	18th Gaudí Awards	Best Supporting Actor	Iván Massagué	Pending	

== See also ==
- List of Spanish films of 2025
