= Bruna Cusí =

Spanish actress (born 1986)

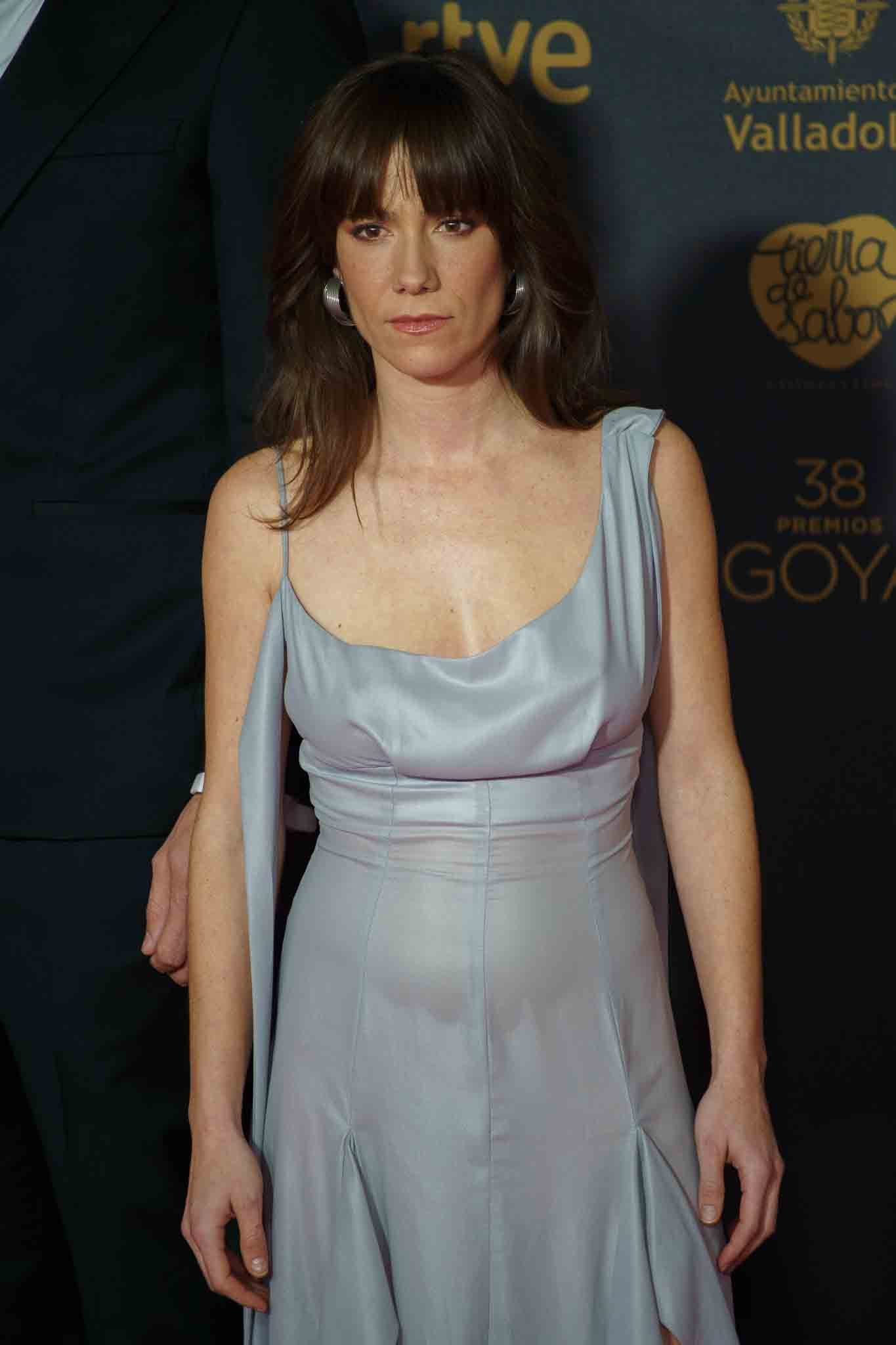
- Cusí in 2024
- Born: Bruna Cusí Echaniz; 9 September 1986 (age 39); Barcelona, Catalonia, Spain
- Occupation: Actress
- Years active: 2011–present
- Website: https://www.brunacusi.com

Bruna Cusí Echaniz (born 9 September 1986) is a Spanish actress, winner of Goya Award for Best New Actress in 2018.

== Biography ==
She was born in Barcelona, Spain, on September 17, 1986, the daughter of fellow actor Enric Cusí. She studied theater at the Colegio del Teatro and Eòlia (2006) and later at the Instituto de Teatro de Barcelona with teachers such as Alfred Cases, Roberto Romei, and Lluís Graells. She graduated with a degree in Dramatic Arts in 2010. He traveled to Italy to study Commedia dell'Arte with Antonio Fava, and learned about Theatre du Mouvement with Yves Marc (2010).

== Filmography ==
=== Film ===
Year	Title	Original title	Role	Notes	Ref.
2017	Summer 1993	Estiu 1993	Marga	Goya Award for Best New Actress	
2017	Uncertain Glory	Incerta glòria	Trini		
2018	Disappear	Desaparecer	Oriol		
2018	Escapada	Escapada	Elena		
2019	The Queen of the Lizards	La reina de los lagartos	Elena		
2019	Ardara	Ardara	Bruna		
2020	The Occupant	Hogar	Lara		
2020	The Barcelona Vampiress	La vampira de Barcelona	Amèlia		
2021	Mía & Moi	Mía y Moi	Mía		
2021	The Replacement	El sustituto	Raquel		
2022	The Path	The Path			
2022	Upon Entry	Upon Entry (La llegada)	Elena		
2023	The Fantastic Golem Affairs	El caso fantástico del Golem	Clara		
2023	Truce(s)	Tregua(s)	Ara		
2023	The Blue Star	La estrella azul	Ana		
2025	Frontier	Frontera	Juliana		
2025	Another Man	Un altre home	Marta		
2026	Balandrau, Where the Fierce Wind Blew	Balandrau, vent salvatge	Mònica		

=== Television ===
Year	Title	Original title	Role	Notes
2011–2013	The Red Band Society	Polseres vermelles	Gavina	8 episodes
2017	Merlí	Merlí	Mel	Episode: "Henry David Thoreau"
2018	What the Future Holds	El día de mañana	Lali	2 episodes
2018	Desayuna conmigo	Desayuna conmigo	Sara	Mini-series
2019	Instinct	Instinto	Bárbara Robles	8 episodes
2020	The Alienist	The Alienist	Mrs. Linares	5 episodes
2022	Heirs to the Land	Los herederos de la tierra	Arsenda	5 episodes

== Accolades ==
Year	Award	Category	Work	Result	Ref.
2018	23rd Forqué Awards	Best Actress in a Film	Summer 1993	Nominated	
2018	10th Gaudí Awards	Best Supporting Actress	Uncertain Glory	Nominated	
2018	10th Gaudí Awards	Best Supporting Actress	Summer 1993	Won	
2018	32nd Goya Awards	Best New Actress	Summer 1993	Won	
2021	13th Gaudí Awards	Best Supporting Actress	The Barcelona Vampiress	Nominated	
2024	16th Gaudí Awards	Best Actress	Upon Entry	Nominated	
2025	80th CEC Medals	Best Supporting Actress	The Blue Star	Nominated	
2026	18th Gaudí Awards	Best Supporting Actress	Frontier	Won	
