= Vilallonga de Ter =

- Municipality
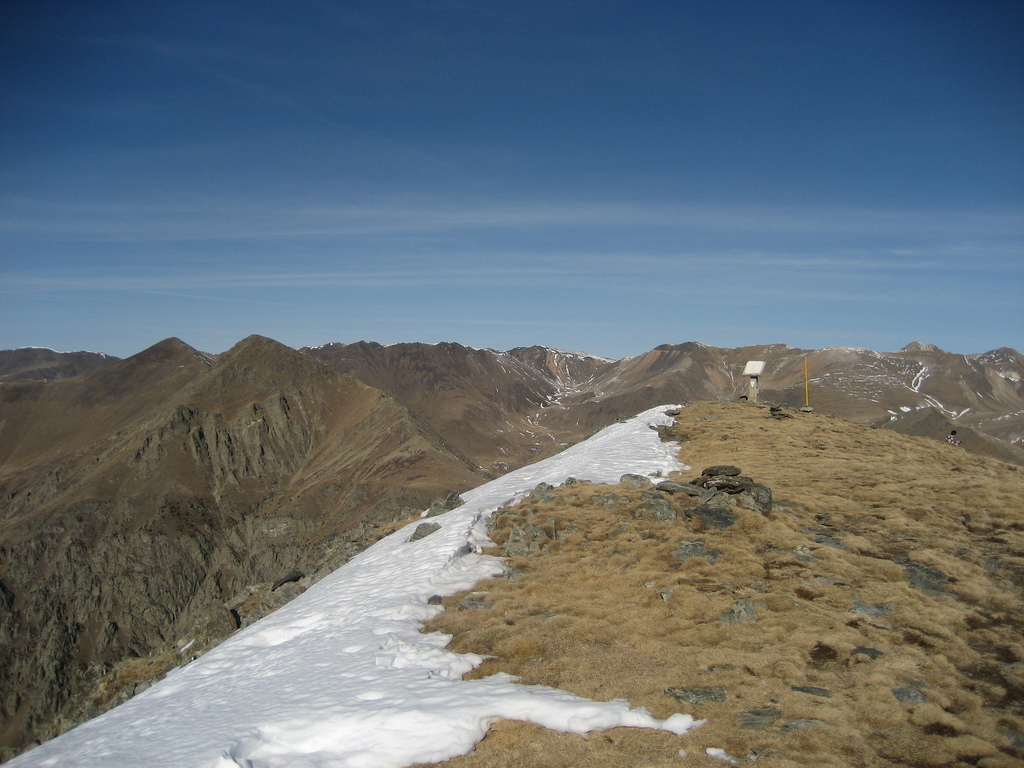
- Summit of Balandrau mountain, at the border between Vilallonga (right) and Queralbs (left)

- Flag Coat of arms

- Location in Catalonia Vilallonga de Ter (Spain)
- Coordinates: 42°20′N 2°19′E
- Country: Spain
- Community: Catalonia
- Province: Girona
- Comarca: Ripollès

Government
  - Mayor: Monica Bonsoms Pastoret (2015)

Area
  - Total: 64.2 km^{2} (24.8 sq mi)

Population (2025-01-01)
  - Total: 395
  - Density: 6.15/km^{2} (15.9/sq mi)
- Website: www.vilallongadeter.cat

Vilallonga de Ter (Catalan pronunciation: [ˌbiləˈʎoŋɡə ðə ˈtɛɾ]) is a village in the province of Girona and autonomous community of Catalonia, Spain.
