= Ángela Cervantes =

Spanish actress (born 1993)

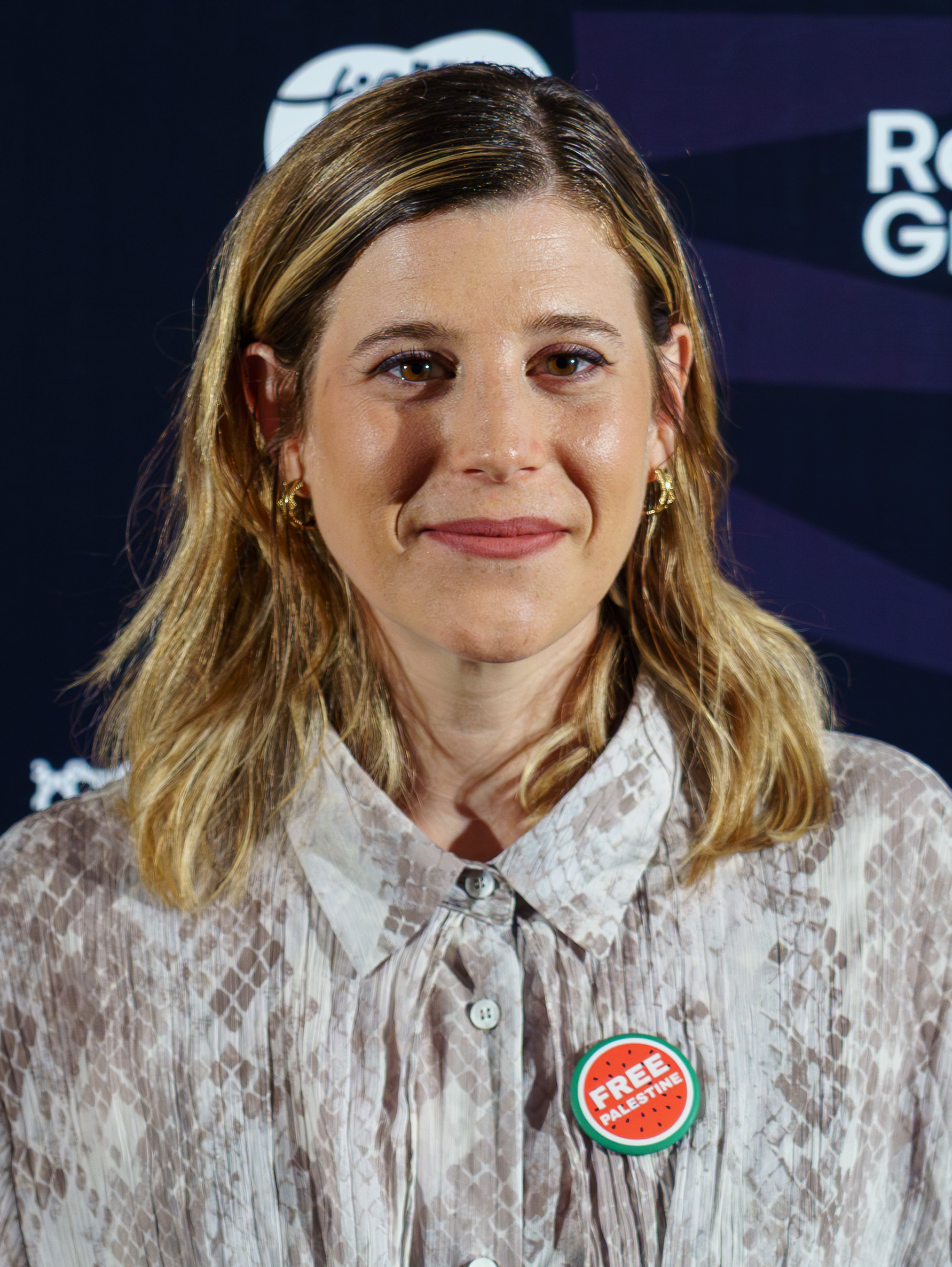
- Cervantes in 2025
- Born: Ángela Cervantes Sorribas; 2 January 1993 (age 33); Barcelona, Catalonia, Spain
- Occupation: Actress
- Relatives: Álvaro Cervantes (brother)

Ángela Cervantes Sorribas (born 2 January 1993) is a Spanish actress.

== Life and career ==
Ángela Cervantes Sorribas was born in Barcelona on 2 January 1993. She has an older brother, Álvaro, who has also pursued an acting career. She played basketball when she was young and studied for a degree in criminology and public prevention policies, though she dropped out to pursue an acting career. Having also been involved in stage plays since young, she made her television debut as an actress in Catalan series such as La riera and Com si fos ahir. She performed the recurring role of Ro in Perfect Life.

She had a breakthrough performance in her first film credits in Carol Rodríguez Colás' comedy-drama Girlfriends (2021), playing Soraya, a bar owner. She was subsequently cast in Paco Caballero's More the Merrier and Laura Mañá's A Boyfriend for My Wife and also landed the role of Penélope in Pilar Palomero's drama La maternal. In 2024, she starred in Valenciana, portraying Valèria, a young journalist whose goals do not come to fruition due to her drug addiction issues.

== Filmography ==
=== Film ===
| Year | Title | Role | Notes | Ref. |
|---|---|---|---|---|
| 2021 | Chavalas (Girlfriends) | Soraya | Feature film debut | |
| 2021 | Donde caben dos (More the Merrier) | Victoria | | |
| 2022 | Un novio para mi mujer (A Boyfriend for My Wife) | Sara | | |
| 2023 | La maternal (Motherhood) | Penélope | | |
| 2024 | Valenciana | Valèria | | |
| 2025 | La furia (Fury) | Alexandra | | |
| 2025 | Lo que queda de ti (The Remnants of You) | Elena | | |
| 2026 | Lapönia (Welcome to Lapland) | Nuria | | |

=== Television ===
| Year | Title | Role | Notes | Ref. |
|---|---|---|---|---|
| TBA | Su majestad | Valentina | Season 2 | |

== Accolades ==
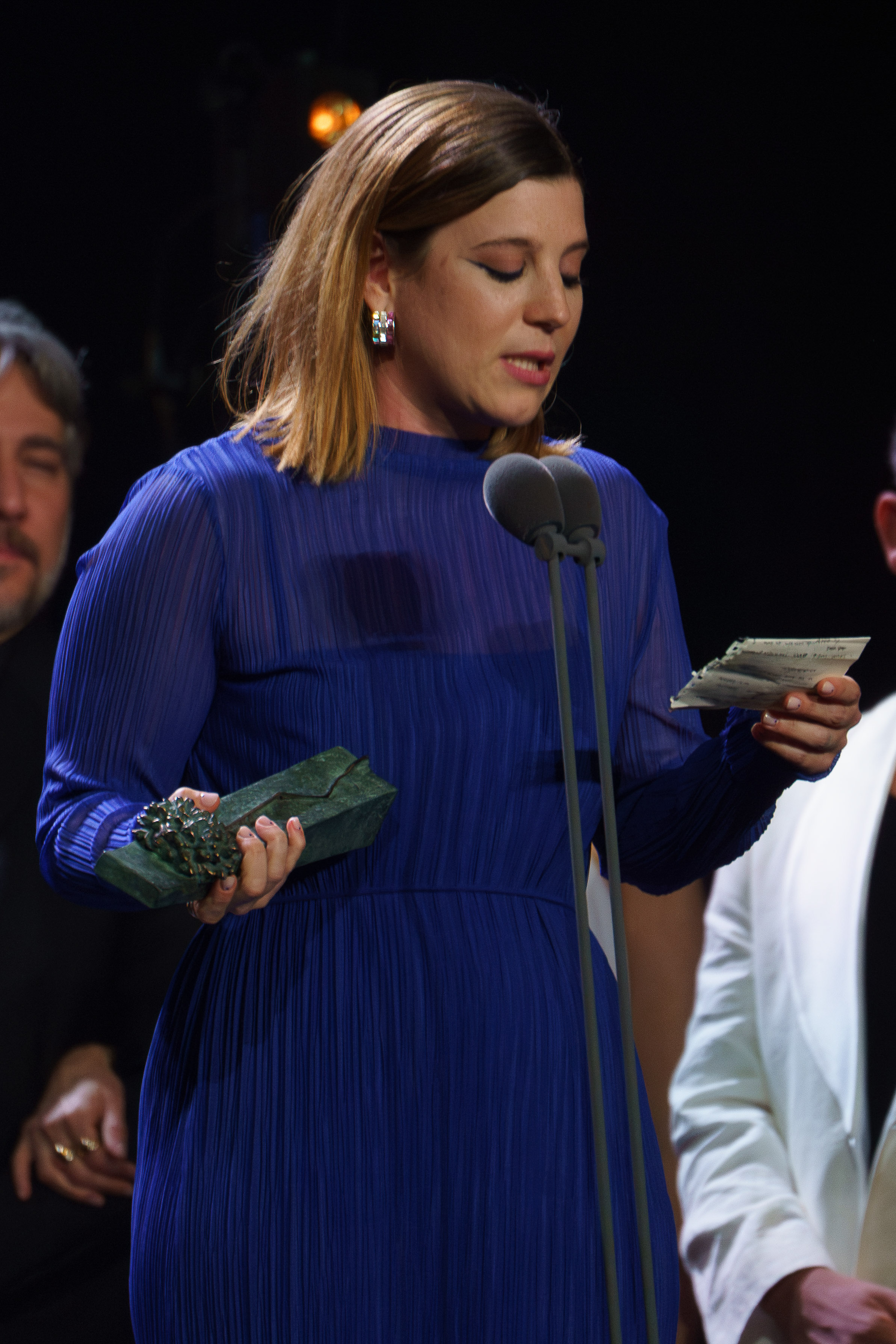
Cervantes holding her Silver Biznaga for Fury in 2025

| Year | Award | Category | Work | Result | Ref. |
|---|---|---|---|---|---|
| 2022 | 77th CEC Medals | Best New Actress | Girlfriends | Nominated | |
| 2022 | 36th Goya Awards | Best New Actress | Girlfriends | Nominated | |
| 2022 | 14th Gaudí Awards | Best Supporting Actress | Girlfriends | Won | |
| 2023 | 15th Gaudí Awards | Best Supporting Actress | Motherhood | Won | |
| 2023 | 10th Feroz Awards | Best Supporting Actress in a Film | Motherhood | Nominated | |
| 2023 | 37th Goya Awards | Best Supporting Actress | Motherhood | Nominated | |
| 2025 | 28th Málaga Film Festival | Silver Biznaga for Best Actress | Fury | Won | |
| 2025 | 31st Forqué Awards | Best Actress in a Film | Fury | Nominated | |
| 2026 | 13th Feroz Awards | Best Main Actress in a Film | Fury | Nominated | |
| 2026 | 18th Gaudí Awards | Best Actress | Fury | Won | |
| 2026 | 40th Goya Awards | Best Actress | Fury | Nominated | |
| 2026 | 34th Actors and Actresses Union Awards | Best Film Actress in a Leading Role | Fury | Nominated | |
