= Balandrau =

Mountain in Spain

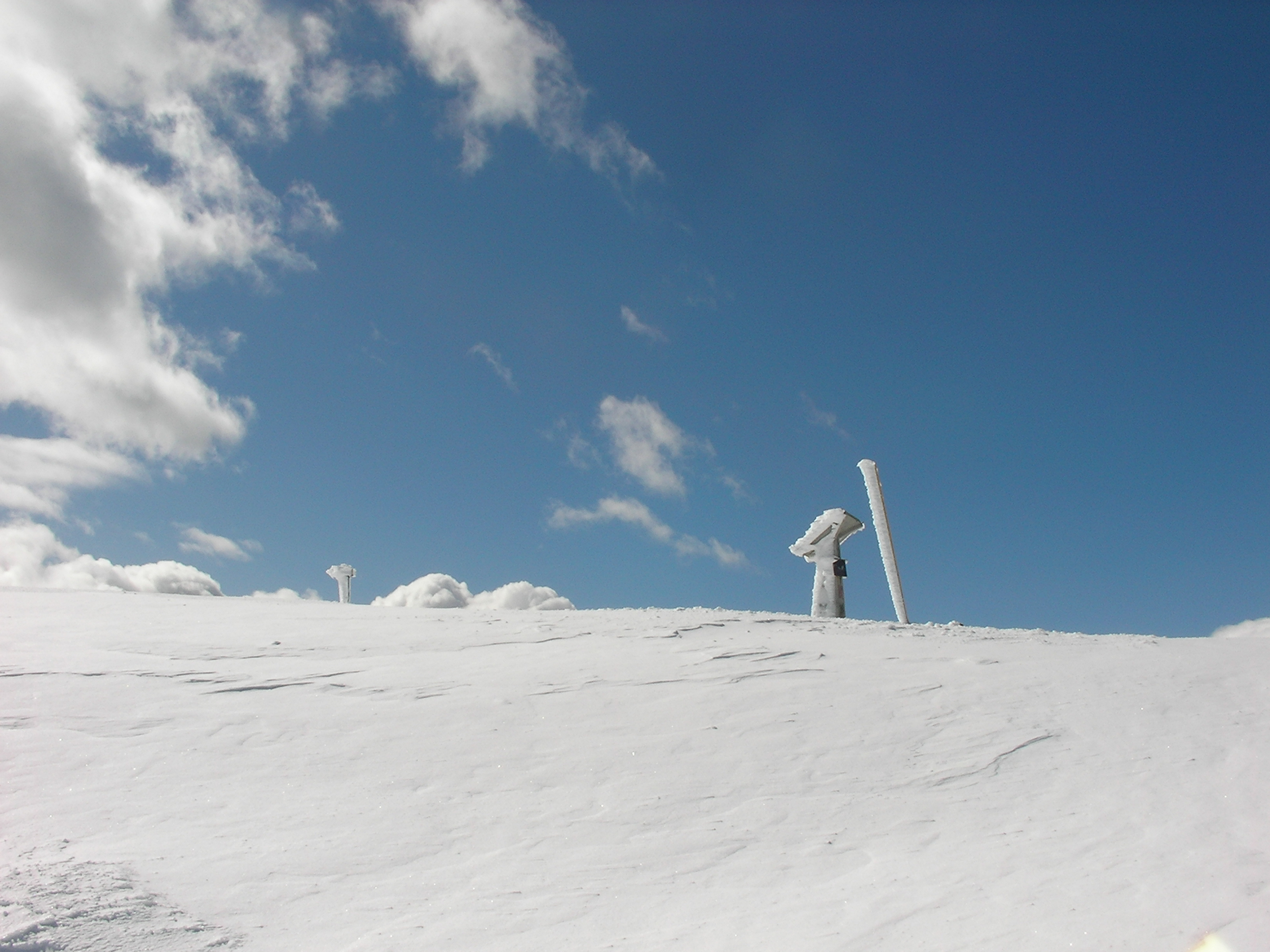
- Balandrau, summit

Highest point
- Elevation: 2,585 m (8,481 ft)
- Listing: List of mountains in Catalonia
- Coordinates: 42°22′11.89″N 02°13′10.73″E

Geography
- Location within Catalonia
- Location: Queralbs, Vilallonga de Ter (Ripollès) Catalonia
- Parent range: Pyrenees

Climbing
- Easiest route: Walk from Refugi de Coma de Vaca

Balandrau is a 2,585-metre-high (8,481 ft) mountain located in the eastern region of the Pyrenees. It separates the valleys of Ribes de Freser and Camprodon, Catalonia, Spain. This mountain lies relatively close to Vall de Núria (Ripollès).

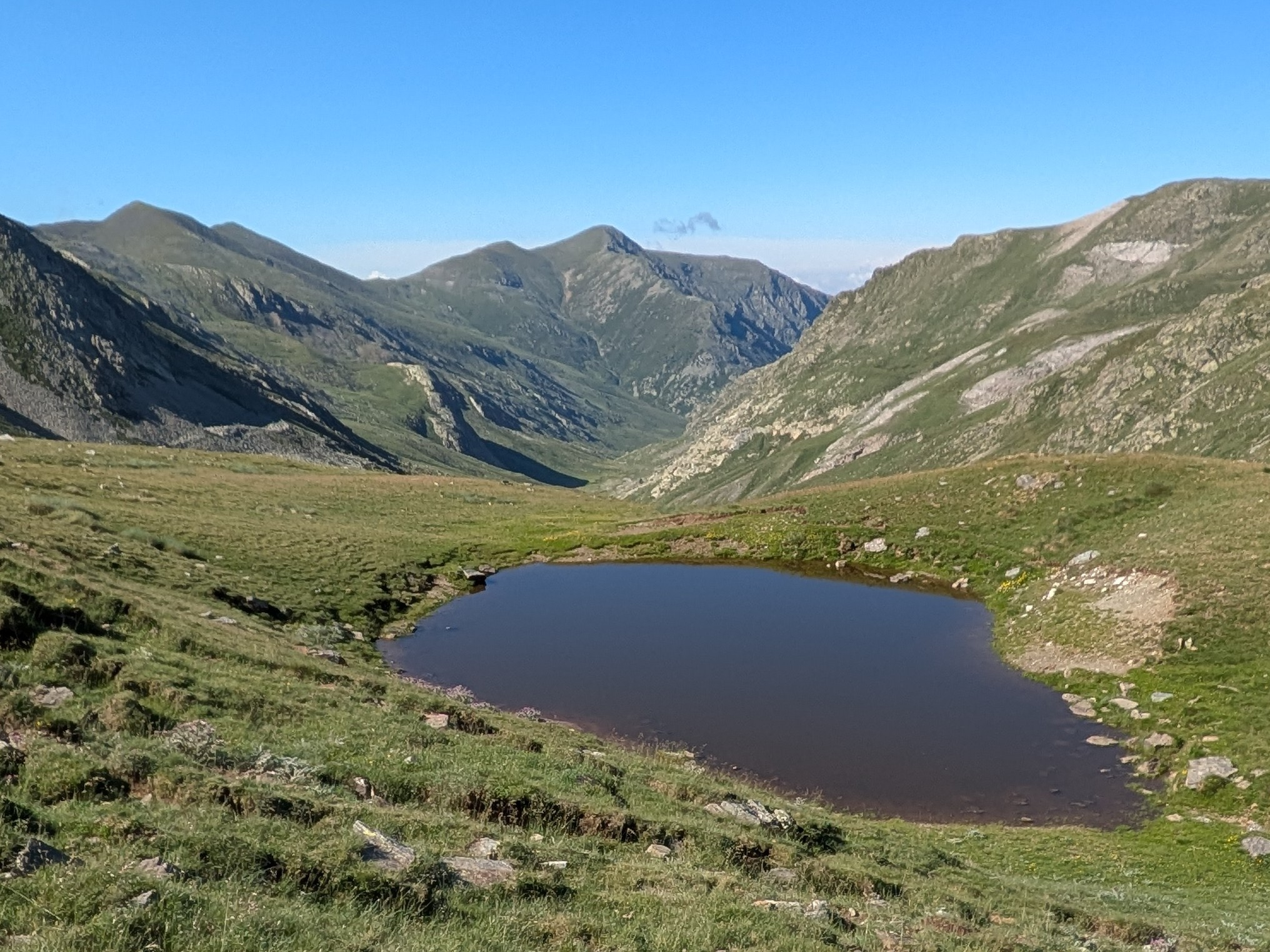
Balandrau mountain (in the distance), seen from the head of the Freser valley.

== 2000 disaster ==
On December 30, 2000, a blizzard killed 9 people near Balandrau.

== See also ==
- Geology of the Pyrenees
