= Miki Esparbé =

Spanish actor

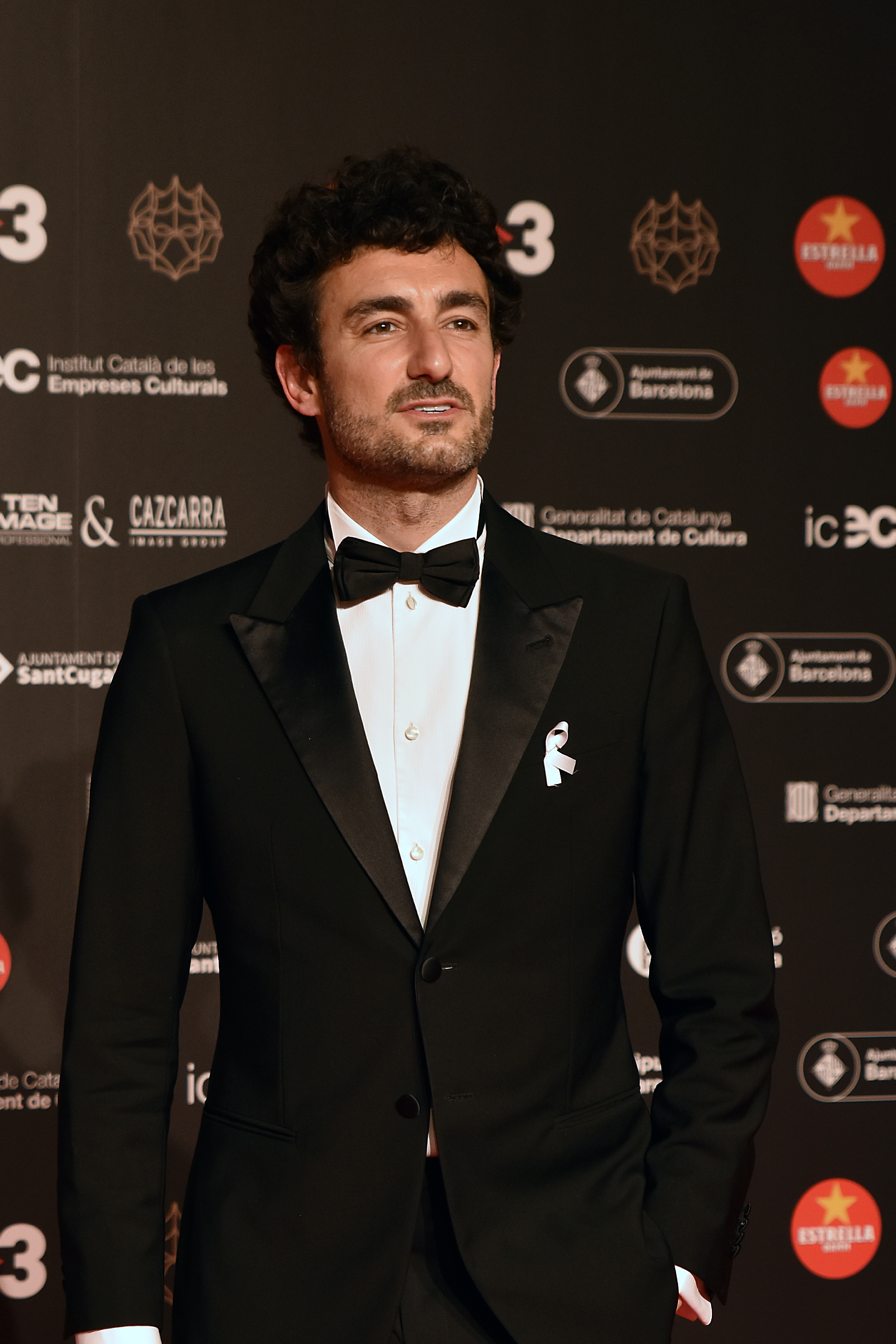
- Esparbé in 2022
- Born: 9 October 1983 (age 42); Manresa, Catalonia, Spain
- Occupation: Actor

Miquel Esparbé Gener (born 9 October 1983), better known as Miki Esparbé, is a Spanish actor. He is known for his performances in Off Course, Barcelona, nit d'estiu, and Cuerpo de élite.

== Biography ==
Born in Manresa, Catalonia, on 9 October 1983, Esparbé earned a licentiate degree in Humanities from the Pompeu Fabra University. He trained in acting at the Nancy Tuñón's school in Barcelona. In his early career, he collaborated in El Terrat's television shows (Divendres and Palomitas).

Following a performance in the 2012 short film Double Check, his debut in a feature film came in 2013 with a performance in the Catalan-language film Barcelona, nit d'estiu. He earned further recognition to a Spain-wide audience with his performance in the 2015 film Off Course.

== Filmography ==
=== Television ===
Key
†	Denotes television productions that have not yet been released

Year	Title	Role	Notes	Ref.
2011–12	Pop ràpid	Toni		
2014	El crac	Nico Carrillo		
2015	Anclados	Raimundo		
2016	El ministerio del tiempo	Joaquín Argamasilla	Guest role. Season 2. Episode 6: "Tiempo de magia"	
2019	Brigada Costa del Sol	Martín Pulido		
2021	Los espabilados (Alive and Kicking)	Izan		
2021	El inocente (The Innocent)	Aníbal		
2021	Reyes de la noche	"Jota" Montes		
2022	Smiley	Bruno		
2025	Anatomía de un instante (The Anatomy of a Moment)	Juan Carlos I		

=== Film ===
Year	Title	Role	Notes	Ref.
2013	Barcelona, nit d'estiu	Carles		
2014	El camí més llarg per tornar a casa (The Long Way Home)	Martí		
2015	Requisitos para ser una persona normal (Requirements to Be a Normal Person)	Gustavo		
2015	Perdiendo el norte (Off Course)	Rafa		
2015	Incidencias (Stranded)	Ramiro		
2015	Barcelona, nit d'hivern (Barcelona Christmas Night)	Carles	Sequel to Barcelona, nit d'estiu	
2016	El rei borni (The One-Eyed King)	Ignasi		
2016	Rumbos (Night Tales)	Iván		
2016	Cuerpo de élite	Santiago "Santi" Bravo		
2017	Es por tu bien (It's for Your Own Good)	Alex		
2017	No sé decir adiós (Can't Say Goodbye)	Sergi		
2018	Les distàncies (Distances)	Comas		
2019	Perdiendo el este (Off Course to China)	Rafa	Sequel to Perdiendo el norte	
2020	Malnazidos (Valley of the Dead)	Jan Lozano		
2021	Tres (Out of Sync)	Iván		
2021	Donde caben dos (More the Merrier)	Pablo		
2025	Wolfgang (Extraordinari) (Wolfgang)	Carles		
2025	Mi amiga Eva (My Friend Eva)	Julián		

== Awards and nominations ==
Year	Award	Category	Work	Result	Ref.
2017	9th Gaudí Awards	Best Leading Actor	The One-Eyed King	Nominated	
2017	72nd CEC Medals	Best New Actor	The One-Eyed King	Nominated	
2019	11th Gaudí Awards	Best Supporting Actor	Distances	Nominated	
2024	79th CEC Medals	Best Actor	Not Such an Easy Life	Nominated	
2024	32nd Actors and Actresses Union Awards	Best Stage Actor in a Secondary Role	Los pálidos	Nominated	
2026	34th Actors and Actresses Union Awards	Best Television Actor in a Minor Role	The Anatomy of a Moment	Nominated	
