= Claudio Zulian =

Italian film director, musician and writer

Claudio Zulian (Campodarsego, Italy) is a filmmaker, video-artist, musician and writer. He has a PhD in Aesthetics, Science and Technology of the Arts by the University of Paris VIII and he directs the production company Acteon while working in Spain and France.

== Work ==
Claudio Zulian's career has developed mainly in cinema, video installations and theatre. In 1993, he founded Acteon, a production company based in Barcelona, through which he produces his works. In 1998, the Contemporary Art Centre of Barcelona (Centre de Cultura Contemporània de Barcelona) hosted his exhibition Scenes from Raval (Escenas del Raval, 1998) where he seeks to give visibility to the environment and people of this Barcelona neighborhood. At the same time, Claudio directed a documentary on the same subject that is also part of the installation.

In 2002, he published the book Horas de la ciudad (2002), a compilation of 24 short stories about the urban fabric and its inhabitants. His interest in showing the relationship between society and the media in a new light is present in his later works such as the photography installation Visions Of Carmel (Visions del Carmel, 2003) or the video installation The Future (L’avenir, 2004) – a documentary version was awarded worldwide - where he reflects on the daily life and hopes of a deindustrialised mining village in Northern France. In The Shifting City (A través del Carmel, 2006), planned both as a documentary and as a video installation, he received the Barcelona City Council Award and the Cinema National Award of Catalonia. Zulian's interest in those people excluded from audiovisual image in media is again clear in his portrait of a Romanian community in Just Like Paradise (A lo mejor, 2007). The same happens in his return to the Carmel district, working with its teenagers in After Violence (Después de la violencia, 2009) as well as in It Won’t Be The Same (No será lo mismo, 2010). Moreover, this interest is reflected in his evocation of a better future in Enthusiasm (Entusiasmo, 2012), prepared in collaboration with several groups of inhabitants and immigrants of Salt (a neighborhood in Girona, Spain).

In 2011, Zulian's documentary Fortuny & The Magic Lantern (Fortuny y la lámpara maravillosa, 2010) was selected at the AlJazeera International Documentary Film Festival and nominated for Best Art Documentary at the PriMED. It explores the relationships between East and West through Mariano Fortuny y Madrazo's designs and sceneries. In 2013, the Jeu de Paume in Paris hosted a retrospective of his works and presents his new creation: Power no power (2013) In 2014, the fiction film Born (2014) was released, which is a drama set in the 18th century. Through the stories of three historical characters, the film explores the beginning of intimate and social interactions that are as true today as they were in the past.

In 2017 his feature-length documentary Fearless (Sin miedo) (2017), about the disappeared of the Guatemalan civil war, premiered at the Festival Internacional del Nuevo Cine Latinoamericano de La Habana. In 2020 No nacimos refugiados, which follows eight people's decisions to go into exile, premiered at Biografilm Festival in Bologna. He also directed The magic mountain (La montagna incantata) (2021), a feature-length documentary and expanded-cinema piece produced with Jolefilm (Italy). In parallel, Zulian's video installations were shown internationally, including We Refugees at the Centro Galego de Arte Contemporánea (CGAC) and, in 2022, a retrospective exhibition titled Vidas at the same institution.

In 2024, Zulian directed Constel·lació Portabella, a documentary portrait of filmmaker Pere Portabella. The film had its world premiere in the Venice Classics section of the Venice Film Festival. In 2026, Zulian published the essay Se ha votado que nosotros somos los santos (Virus Editorial), examining the political and psychological dynamics of contemporary capitalism. He is currently in post-production on A través del Carmel 20.26, a documentary that retraces, twenty years later and on the same calendar day, the route of his 2006 documentary A través del Carmel, winner of the Catalonia National Film Award and the Barcelona City Award.

== Filmography & video installations ==
- 1998 - Escenas del Raval (Scenes from Raval) – installation
- 2002 - Miradas extrañas (Strange Looks) – short film
- 2004 - Beatriz / Barcelona – feature film
- 2004 - L’avenir (The Future) – video installation and documentary
- 2006 - A través del Carmel (The Shifting City) – video installation and feature-length documentary
- 2007 - A lo mejor (Just like Paradise) – video installation and documentary
- 2009 - Después de la violencia (After Violence) – video installation
- 2010 - Fortuny y la lámpara maravillosa (Fortuny & the Magic Lantern) – documentary
- 2010 - No será lo mismo (It Won't be the same) – video installation
- 2011 - 2031/2111 – video installation and documentary
- 2012 - Entusiasmo (Enthusiasm) – video installation
- 2013 - Power No Power – art film, in Stories of the future, films retrospective at Jeu de Paumes, Paris.
- 2014 - Born – feature film
- 2017 - Fearless (Sin miedo) – feature-length documentary
- 2019 - Vallès: making pasts, making futures – Videoinstallation and printouts
- 2020 - We Were Not Born Refugees – Feature-length documentary
- 2022 - Lives – Retrospective of projects and video installations, CGAC, Galego Center of Contemporary Art, Santiago de Compostela.
- 2023 - The magic mountain (La montagna incantata) – Feature-length documentary and video installation
- 2024 - Portabella constellation – Feature-length documentary
- 2026 - La montangna incantata – films and sound installation at Miró Mallorca Foundation
