= Carlos Boyero =

Spanish film critic

- Born: Carlos Sánchez Boyero; 2 May 1953 (age 72); Salamanca, Spain
- Occupation: Film critic

Carlos Sánchez Boyero (born 2 May 1953) is a Spanish film critic. He has published in Diario 16, El Mundo, and El País, and is a regular collaborator of Cadena SER. He is a popular and controversial film critic, whose figure has polarized public opinion and that of his colleagues in the profession.

== Life and career ==
Carlos Sánchez Boyero was born in Salamanca on 2 May 1953. He removed his paternal surname due to bad blood with his father. He moved to Madrid in 1972 and studied at the Complutense University of Madrid, where he befriended Fernando Trueba and Antonio Resines. Boyero struggled with alcoholism and drug abuse in his early life, spending time in four drug rehab centers. Trueba advised him to write a column about nightlife in Guía del Ocio, and some time later he began to write film critics for the magazine. He was fired from Guía del Ocio in 1986 for writing excessive negative reviews. Pedro J. Ramírez hired him to work for Diario 16, and after the newspaper's closure, Boyero joined El Mundo. He began writing regularly for El País in 2007.

In 2008, a letter signed by Víctor Erice, José Luis Guerin, Miguel Marías, and Álvaro Arroba was sent to El País "severely" questioning Boyero's activity as a film critic. It had support from the likes of filmmakers Chantal Akerman, Lisandro Alonso, Mercedes Álvares, Isaki Lacuesta, film critics such as Carlos Losilla, Àngel Quintana, Santos Zunzunegui, Gonzalo de Lucas, José Manuel López, Carlos Reviriego and Xavi Serra and other film personalities such as Filmoteca Española director, Antonio Santamarina and producer Luis Miñarro. Meanwhile, Boyero was then defended by fellow ABC colleague Oti Rodríguez Marchante. Boyero is a best known detractor of filmmaker Pedro Almodóvar, regularly penning dismissive reviews containing personal attacks on Almodóvar.

According to Manuel J. Lombardo his detractors revile "his disdain for the new, his egotistical haughtiness, his immovable classical tastes, and his laziness for discovery". His comments disparaging Jodie Foster's physical looks in 2024 during a negative review of True Detective: Night Country also attracted public examination and scrutiny.

A documentary film titled The Critic examining his life and career was presented in 2022 at the 70th San Sebastián International Film Festival.
