= Nausicaa Bonnín =

Spanish actress

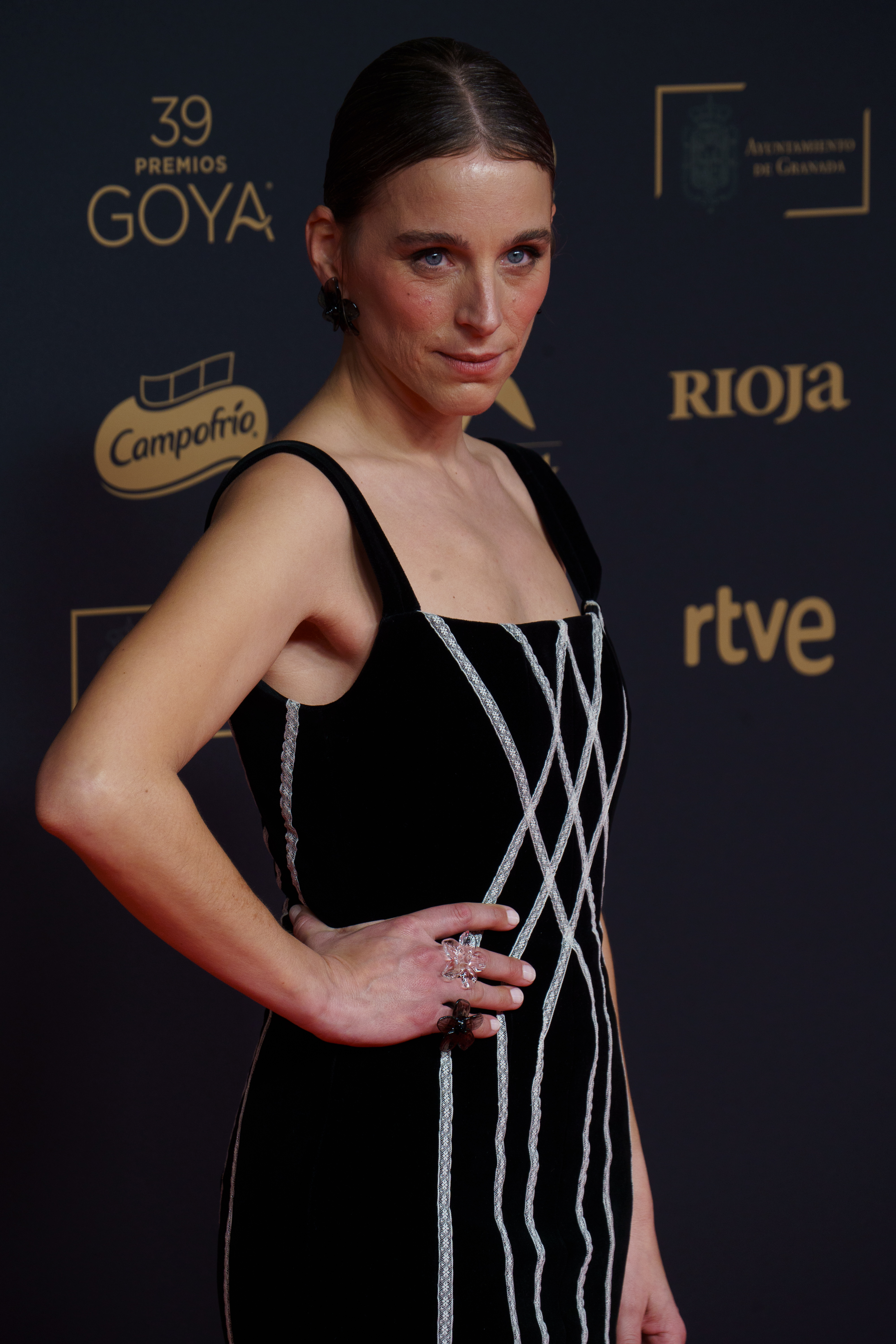
- Bonnín in 2025
- Born: Nausicaa Bonnín Dufrenoy; 28 April 1985 (age 41); Barcelona, Spain
- Occupation: Actress
- Years active: 1996-present

Nausicaa Bonnín Dufrenoy (born 28 April 1985) is a Catalan actress of theater, film and television.

== Biography ==
Bonnin began her career as an actress at a young age participating in plays such as Cartes a nenes, Contes dels boscos de Viena or El bell lloc.

In 2005 she participated in the film Las vidas de Celia by Antonio Chavarrías, where she played Astrid. Also that year she joined the long-running TV3 production El cor de la ciutat where she played Sandra Benjumea until 2009, when the series ended.

In 2006 she played Rosa in Ventura Pons' film La vida abismal. In addition, she also participated in the theatrical production Nausica, an adaptation of Joan Maragall's dramatic poem directed by Hermann Bonnín.

In 2007 she was part of the cast of the film Lo mejor de mí, by Roser Aguilar. In theater, she participated in El jardí abandonat by Santiago Rusiñol and directed by Francesc Nel·lo and also joined the play El llibertí by Erik Emmanuel Schmitt and directed by Joan Lluís Bozzo, in which she participated until 2009.

In 2009 she starred in director Mar Coll's debut film Tres días con la familia. This performance earned her the Gaudí Award for best leading actress in 2010, as well as a nomination for best new actress at the Goya Awards that same year.

The following year she participated in the film Elisa K with Aina Clotet.

In 2011 she starred in the TV3 mini-series Barcelona, ciudad neutral junto a Bernat Quintana, with Bernat Quintana. The production, of two chapters, tells a love story between two young people and is set in the city of Barcelona during the First World War. She also returns to the stage to participate in the play La gaviota, a dramatic comedy by Antón Chéjov directed by Rubén Ochandino.

In 2012 she starred in the play Grooming, with Antonio de la Torre at the Teatro de la Abadía in Madrid. It's a text written by Paco Bezerra and directed by José Luis Gómez that deals with the paraphilia of an adult who uses the Internet to gain the trust of a minor. Also that year she premiered the film El cuerpo by Oriol Paulo with Belén Rueda and Aura Garrido.

In 2013 she was part of the cast of the Telecinco series Familia, along with Alexandra Jiménez and Juana Acosta. The series was cancelled by the network in the first season due to low ratings.

2014 was a great year for Bonnín. She received critical acclaim for her performance in the play La dama de les camèlies, a text by Alexandre Dumas directed by Hermann Bonnín. In addition, she also participated in the play Ocells i llops by Josep Maria de Segarra in the National Theater of Catalonia and in the musical Tots fem comèdia by Joaquim Oristrell. In the cinema she premiered the film Los tontos y los estúpidos by Roberto Castón.

In 2015 she starred in the play L'efecte with Pau Roca. It is a play by Lucy Prebble, was directed by Carol López and was performed at the Sala Beckett in Barcelona. She also premiered at the Almagro Festival the play La cena del Rey Baltasar by Calderón de la Barca and directed by Hermann Bonnín. In television, she participated in the TV3 movie Fassman, a thriller about paranormal phenomena directed by Joaquim Oristrell. On the small screen, she was part of the choral cast of the TV3 sitcom Citas. Bonnín participated in 2 episodes of the first season where she played Sofía, a young woman who arranges a date through an Internet application with Paula (Laia Costa). In addition, she also premiered the film Secuestro, a thriller directed by Mar Tarragona and starring Blanca Portillo and José Coronado.

In 2016 she returned to play Sofia in the second season of the TV3 series Citas. In the theater, she starred in Sunday Monday with Isak Férriz, a thriller by Carol López at the Flyhard theater in Barcelona, was part of the cast of Don Juan, a play by Molière directed by David Selvas and starring Julio Manrique at the National Theater of Catalonia. Within the Grec Festival, she participated in the play Las brujas de Salem by Arthur Miller, directed by Andrés Lima and adapted by Eduardo Mendoza. In February 2016 she participated in an episode of the web-series El Ramón de les Olives.

She participated, in 2017, in the Telecinco series Sé quién eres. She also filmed the TV-movie La luz de la esperanza, a co-production between TVE and TV3.

== Theater ==
- Contes dels boscos by Viena (1994)
- El bell lloc (1998), by Joan Brossa.
- El combat de les sorpreses o El misteri de l'estoig xinès (2000), by Hermann Bonnín (y Hausson).
- Aquí al bosc (2001), by Joan Brossa.
- Magnus (2005), by Jordi Teixidor.
- La intrusa (2005), by Maurice Maeterlinck.
- Nausica (2006), by Joan Maragall (Jordi Coca's version).
- El jardí abandonat (2007), by Santiago Rusiñol.
- El parany de medusa (2007), by Erik Satie.
- El llibertí (2007-2008), by Éric-Emmanuel Schmitt.
- La gaviota (2011) by Antón Chéjov.
- Grooming (2012), by Paco Bezerra.
- La dama de las camelias (2014), by Alexandre Dumas.
- Ocells i llops (2014), by Josep Maria de Sagarra.
- Tots fem comèdia (2014), by Joaquim Oristrell.
- L'efecte (2015), by Lucy Prebble.
- La cena del Rey Baltasar (2015), by Calderón de la Barca.
- Sunday Morning (2016), by Carol López.
- Don Juan (2016), by Molière.
- Las brujas de Salem (2016), by Arthur Miller.

== Films ==
- Andrea (1996).
- No puc deixar de dir adéu (1997). Short film.
- Una ombra al meu camí (2004). Short film.
- Lo mejor de mí (2006).
- Las vidas de Celia (2006).
- La vida abismal (2007).
- Cámping (2007). TV movie.
- Dibujo de David (2007). Short film.
- Tres dies amb la família (2009).
- Elisa K (2010).
- Barcelona, ciutat neutral (2011). TV-movie TV3.
- El cuerpo (2012)
- Fassman (2014). TV-movie TV3.
- Secuestro (2016).
- La luz de Elna (2016)
- Sé quién eres (2017)
- La luz de Elna (2017)

== Television series ==
Year	Title	Channel	Character	Duration
2005 - 2009	El cor de la ciutat	TV3	Sandra Benjumea	120 episodes
2008	Paradigma	TV3	Ginebra	11 episodes
2011	La sagrada família	TV3	Marta	1 episode
2011	Barcelona, ciutat neutral	TV3	Glòria	2 episodes
2013	Familia: Manual de supervivencia	Telecinco	Natalia Oquendo	7 episodes
2015 - 2016	Cites	TV3	Sofía Guerrero	4 episodes
2016	El Ramón de les olives	YouTube	Ella misma	1 episode
2017	Servir y proteger	La 1	Laura Escalada López	149 episodes
2017	Sé quién eres	Telecinco	Charry	7 episodes
2019	Foodie Love	HBO España	Repartidora	1 episode
2019	Días de Navidad	Netflix	Sofía	1 episode
2020	La fossa	TV3 / À Punt	Andrea	4 episodes
