= Clara Peya Rigolfas =

Spanish musician

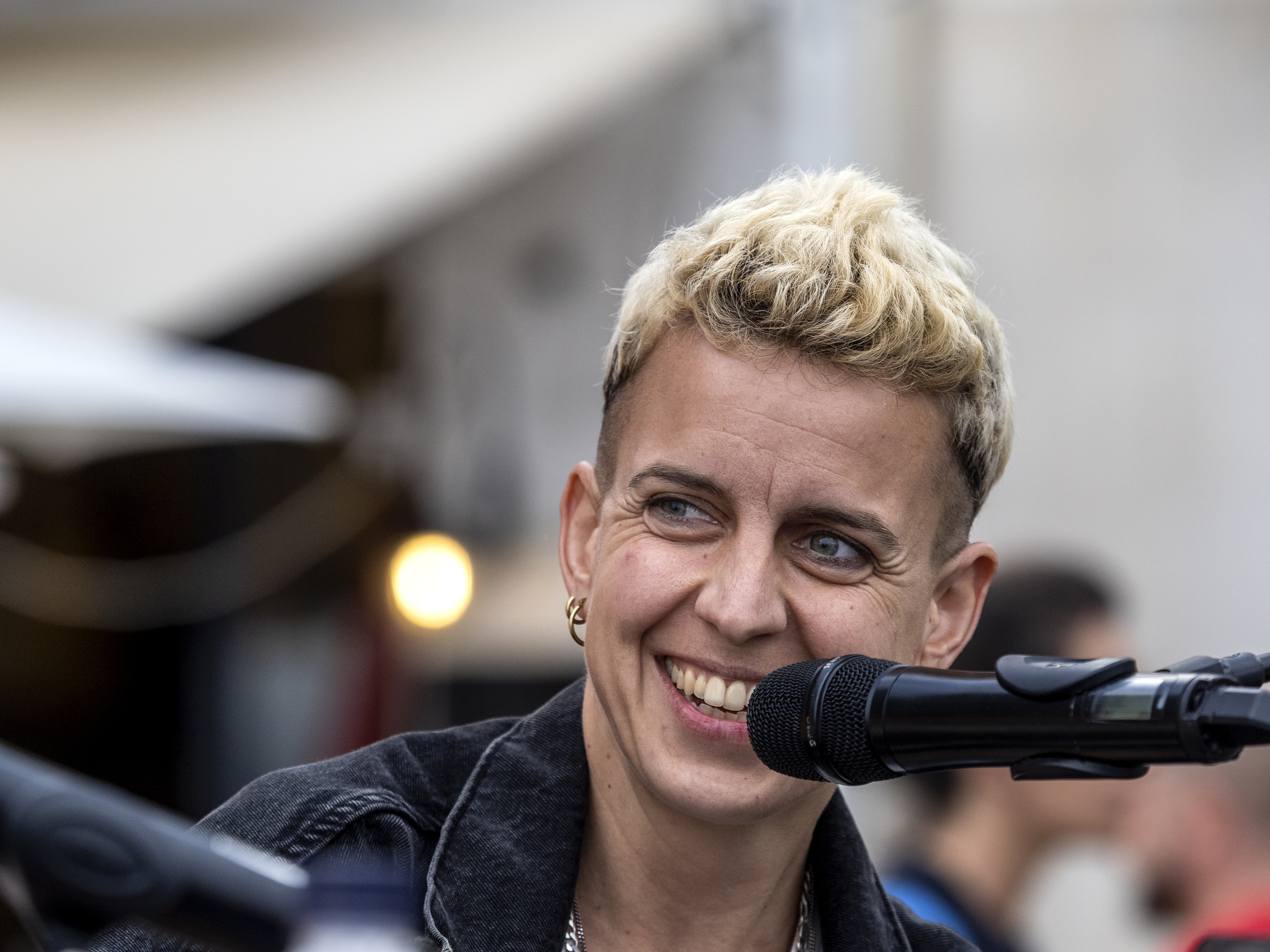
- Born: Clara Peya Rigolfas; 6 April 1986; Palafrugell, Catalonia
- Education: ESMUC Music School of Catalonia
- Occupations: Musician, composer
- Website: clarapeya.com

Clara Peya Rigolfas (born 6 April 1986, Palafrugell) is a Catalan pianist, composer, and performer. She has recorded several albums both as a solo artist and with other musicians and vocalists. She is also the co-founder, together with Ariadna Peya, of the company Les Impuxibles. In 2019, she received the National Culture Award of Catalonia. She is openly a lesbian.

== Early years and studies ==
Clara Peya is the daughter of two doctors and grew up in a family environment with a strong presence of music, thanks to the influence of her aunt, Josefina Rigolfas i Torras, a well-known Catalan pianist. Clara began studying piano at a young age together with her sister Ariadna.

In 2007, she graduated in classical piano from the ESMUC school of music, where she studied with Professor Leonid Sintsev. She studied with Sintsev for more than twelve years all in all, including time at the Rimsky-Korsakov Conservatory in Saint Petersburg. She later pursued higher studies in jazz and modern music at the Taller de Músics workshops in Barcelona.

== Musical career ==
Clara has recorded many piano-based albums; some as a solo pianist, others with a variety of musicians and vocalists. Her style combines elements of free-style, jazz, chamber music, rap, electronic music, and pop, and she often incorporates themes of social justice, diversity, mental health issues and feminism into her work. She is also the co-founder, together with her sister Ariadna Peya, a choreographer and dancer, of the company Les Impuxibles which combines music, dance and theatre.

== Albums ==
- Declaracions (2008)
- +Declaracions (2010)
- Tot aquest silenci (2012)
- Tot aquest soroll (2013)
- Espiral (2014)
- Mímulus (2016)
- Oceanes (2017)
- Estomac (2018)
- A A (Analogia de l’A-mort) (2019)
- Estat de larva (2020)
- Perifèria (2022)
- Corsé (2024)
- Solilòquia (2025)

== Projects with Les Impuxibles ==
- Tot és fum (2012)
- Mrs Death (2013)
- Amurs (2014)
- 4Carmen (OBNC, Festival de Castell de Peralada 2015)
- Limbo (2015)
- Llum de paraula (2015)
- Renard, o el llibre de les bèsties (Teatre Lliure, Barcelona 2016)
- Jane Eyre (Teatre Lliure, Barcelona 2017)
- AÜC El so de les esquerdes (2017)
- Painball (2018)
- Suite Toc (2019)
- FAM (2020)
- Des-espera (2020)
- Harakiri (2021)
- Caramel (Teatre Lliure, Barcelona 2024)
- Casa 4 (2024)

== Work on soundtracks, theatre and other collaborations ==
- Homes foscos (Teatre El Maldà, Barcelona 2016)
- En femme (film directed by Alba Barbé i Serra, 2016)
- Medusa (Festival Temporada Alta, 2017)
- Mares i filles (Teatre Poliorama, Barcelona 2018)
- Com menja un caníbal (Andorra, Lloret de Mar, 2019)
- Els que callen (film directed by Albert Folk, 2020)
- Infanticida (Sala Beckett, Barcelona 2020)
- I només jo vaig escapar-ne (Teatre Lliure, Barcelona 2021)
- Viatge d’hivern (Sala Beckett, Barcelona 2022)
- Maldita. A love song to Sarajevo (film directed by Amaia Remirez and Raúl de la Fuente, 2022)
- El Peix Daurat (Sala Atrium, Barcelona 2023)
- Caída libre (film by Laura Jou, 2024)
- Wolfgang (film directed by Javier Ruiz Caldera, 2025)

== Awards ==
- Enderrock magazine Best Singer-songwriter Album 2023 for Corsé
- Best Concert Tour 2023, by the Catalan Music Academy for Perifèria
- Alicia Interdisciplinary Award 2022 for the performance FAM
- National Cultural Award of Catalonia 2019
- Premi Butaca Award 2019, Best Composition for Suite TOC num. 6
- Premi Butaca Award 2019, Best Performance for Suite TOC num. 6
- Premi Butaca Award 2019, Best Soundtrack for AÜC
- Festival Altaveu Award for Artistic Career, 2019
- Enderrock magazine Best Album 2018 Award for Estómac
