= 3Cat =

Catalan-language video on demand service

3Cat is a Catalan language video on demand and streaming service. The service was launched by the Corporació Catalana de Mitjans Audiovisuals (CCMA) on 30 October 2023.

== History ==
In December 2022, the Corporació Catalana de Mitjans Audiovisuals (CCMA) launched the strategic plan Connectem per arribar a tothom (Let's Connect to Reach Everyone). The following March, the concept was presented, with coverage in the Catalan language in areas where the language had not been common, such as viral videos, video games and influencers.

The name 3Cat was revealed in July 2023, as a fusion between Televisió de Catalunya's TV3 channel and Catalunya Ràdio.

3Cat was launched on 30 October 2023, with 280,000 hours of audio and visual content in the Catalan language available on a free application. The launch was attended by the President of the Government of Catalonia Pere Aragonès and the President of the Parliament of Catalonia Anna Erra.

According to the CCMA's figures, the first year of 3Cat saw 1.2 million users and 219 million streams, while its library rose to 342,500 hours of content.
