= 5th Carmen Awards =

2026 Andalusian film awards

- Date: 31 January 2026
- Site: Granada Conference & Exhibition Centre, Granada, Andalusia, Spain
- Hosted by: Manu Sánchez
- Organized by: Andalusian Film Academy

Highlights
- Honorary career award: Miguel Hermoso
- Most awards: Los Tigres (10)
- Most nominations: Los Tigres & Golpes (15)

Television coverage
- Network: Canal Sur

The 5th Carmen Awards ceremony, presented by the Andalusian Film Academy, took place on 31 January 2026 at the Conference & Exhibition Centre in Granada. There ceremony was broadcast on Canal Sur.

== Background ==
In December 2025 the filmmaker Miguel Hermoso was announced as the recipient of the Honorary Carmen Award. Rocío Mesa and Cristalino read the nominations from the stage of La Chumbera in Granada on 16 December 2025.

The gala was hosted by Manu Sánchez while Zahara, Antonio José, Rosa López, and Lagartija Nick were announced as musical acts.

== Winners and nominations ==
The winners and nominees are listed as follows:

Best Fiction Feature Film: Los Tigres; The Heaven of Animals; Golpes; The Exiles	Best Director: Alberto Rodríguez — Los Tigres; Celia Rico Clavellino — The Good Manners; Fernando Franco — Subsuelo; Santi Amodeo — The Heaven of Animals
Best Original Screenplay: Rafael Cobos, Alberto Rodríguez — Los Tigres; Laura Hojman, María D. Valderrama — Un hombre libre; Rafael Cobos, Fernando Navarro — Golpes; Reyes Gallegos, Rafael Cobos — Ellas en la ciudad	Best Adapted Screenplay: Fernando Franco — Subsuelo; Celia Rico Clavellino — The Good Manners; Santi Amodeo — The Heaven of Animals; Yolanda Centeno — The Stepmother's Bond
Best Actor: Jesús Carroza — Golpes; Antonio de la Torre — Los Tigres; Félix Gómez — Mr. No One; Manolo Solo — The Portuguese House	Best Actress: Paula Díaz — The Heaven of Animals; Arantxa del Sol — Camino negro; Elena Martínez — Aullar; Paz Padilla — Cuerpos locos
Best Supporting Actor: Joaquín Núñez — Los Tigres; Antonio Estrada — Golpes; Cristalino — Golpes; José Manuel Poga — Enemies	Best Supporting Actress: Silvia Acosta — Los Tigres; África de la Cruz — The Heaven of Animals; Estefanía de los Santos — Enemies; Mamen Camacho — The Exiles
Best New Actor: Hugo Welzel — Enemies; Carlos Bernardino — Golpes; César Vicente — Los Tigres; Jesús del Moral — Los Tigres	Best New Actress: Teresa Garzón — Golpes; Cristina Kovani — Virgins; Montse Torrent — Coraje; Sandra Torrecillas — Aullar
Best New Director: Rafael Cobos — Golpes; Alex O'Dogherty — De todos lados un poco; Reyes Gallegos — Ellas en la ciudad; Yolanda Centeno — The Stepmother's Bond	Best Original Score: Bronquio — Golpes; Julio de la Rosa — Los Tigres; Marcos Amodeo — The Heaven of Animals; Pablo Cervantes — The Stepmother's Bond
Best Original Song: Bronquio, Rafael Cobos, Jaime Gastalver, Teresa Garzón — "La tierra esconde" from Golpes; Marcos Amodeo — "Ella es un ángel" from The Heaven of Animals; Javier Ruibal — "La tierra de Amira" from Amira's Land; Juan Manuel Mantecón — "Y quise volar" from Antonio, el bailarín de España	Best Cinematography: Pau Esteve — Los Tigres; Alberto Pareja — Enemies; Alejandro Toro, Hugo Cabezas, Sergio Caro — Ellas en la ciudad; Manu Trillo — La marisma
Best Production Supervision: Manolo Limón — The Exiles; Bea Rodríguez Vives — Enemies; Irene Hens — Ellas en la ciudad; Javi Mateos — The Stepmother's Bond	Best Documentary Feature Film: Ellas en la ciudad; Antonio, el bailarín de España; La marisma; Un hombre libre
Best Editing: José M. García Moyano — Los Tigres; Darío García — Golpes; Darío García, Silvia Moreno — Ellas en la ciudad; Mer Cantero — Un hombre libre	Best Costume Design: Lourdes Fuentes — Golpes; Ainhoa Badiola — The Heaven of Animals; Esther Vaquero — Subsuelo; Fernando García — Los Tigres
Best Sound: Dani de Zayas — Los Tigres; Dani de Zayas, Carli Pérez Valero, Jorge Marín — The Heaven of Animals; Diana Sagrista, Abraham F. Apresa — The Exiles; Jorge Marín — Golpes	Best Art Direction: Pepe Domínguez — Los Tigres; Elena Soriano — The Heaven of Animals; Gigia Pellegrini — Golpes; Pilar Angulo — Virgins
Best Makeup and Hairstyles: Yolanda Piña, Félix Terrero — Los Tigres; María Liaño, Rada Mora — Subsuelo; Yolanda Caballero, Rocío Santana — The Heaven of Animals; Yolanda Piña, Inés Díaz — Golpes	Best Special Effects: Juanma Nogales — Enemies; Amparo Martínez Barco — The Exiles; Amparo Martínez Barco, Joaquín Ortega — Virgins; Israel Millán — Te protegerán mis alas
Best Fiction Short Film: All You Need Is Love; Macarena, una comedia espiritual; Piedra, papel, o tijera; Quejío de loba	Best Documentary Short Film: Hermanas; Desenterrar un rosal; El amoragaor; Portales
Best Animation Feature Film: Awakening Beauty	Best Animation Short Film: One-Way Cycle; Un futuro prometedor
Best Non-Andalusian Produced Film: Sundays; Enemies; Maspalomas; Deaf

=== Films with multiple nominations and awards ===
Films with multiple nominations
Nominations	Film
15	Los Tigres
15	Golpes
12	The Heaven of Animals
7	Enemies
6	Ellas en la ciudad
4	Subsuelo
4	The Exiles
4	The Stepmother's Bond
3	Virgins
3	Un hombre libre
2	The Good Manners
2	Aullar
2	La marisma
2	Antonio, el bailarín de España

Films with multiple awards
Wins	Film
10	Los Tigres
6	Golpes
2	Enemies
