= Hugo Welzel =

Spanish actor

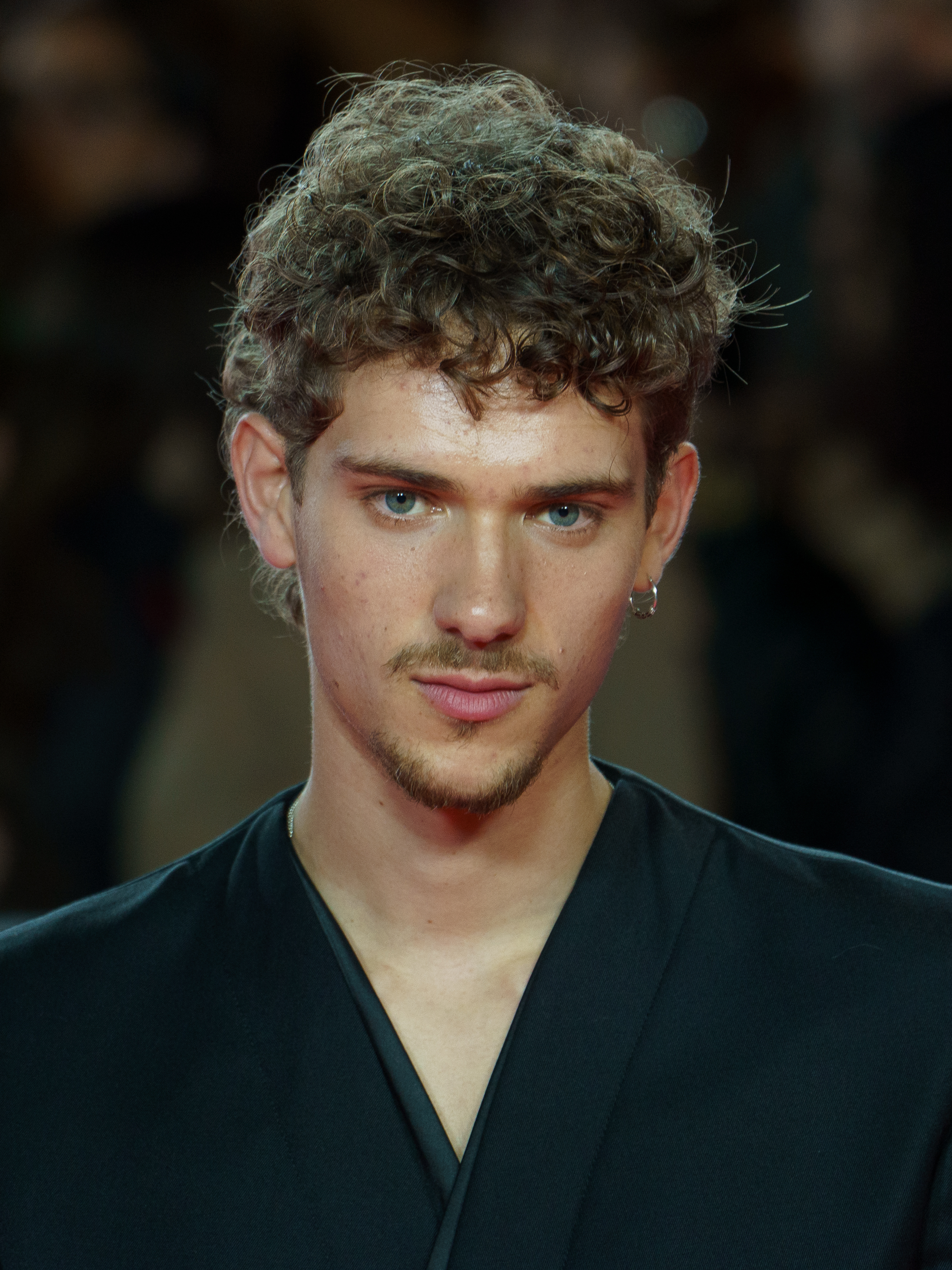
- Welzel in 2025
- Born: 2004 (age 21–22); Seville, Andalusia, Spain
- Occupation: Actor

Hugo Welzel (born 2004) is a Spanish actor.

== Life and career ==
Welzel was born in Seville in 2004. He began to train his acting chops at the 'Viento Sur' theatre school and the 'Sebastián Haro' acting lab. He landed a role as one of the friends of the protagonist the miniseries The Invisible Girl (2023). Also in 2023, he starred as a 17-year-old member of a Neo-Nazi group in Rafael Cobos' mother-son thriller miniseries The Left-Handed Son, and appeared in the Prime Video series Urban: La vida es nuestra.

He made his big screen debut in 2025 with a leading role opposite Christian Checa as a young bully from a dysfunctional family in the thriller Enemies (2025). His performance in the film earned him a nomination for Best New Actor at the 5th Carmen Awards, for Best Actor at the 38th ASECAN Awards, anda for Best New Actor at the 40th Goya Awards. Also in 2025, he featured in the second season of the mystery series The Snow Girl and in the teen drama series Mar afuera. He also joined the cast of the 2026 film La bola negra.

== Filmography ==
=== Film ===
Year	Title	Role	Notes	Ref.
2025	Enemigos (Enemies)	El Rubio	Feature film debut	
2026	Los justos (The Righteous)	Patrick		
2026	La bola negra	Enrique		

=== Television ===
Year	Title	Role	Notes	Ref.
2023	La chica invisible (The Invisible Girl)	Iván		
2023	El hijo zurdo (The Left-Handed Son)	Lorenzo		
2023	Urban. La vida es nuestra	Bryan		
2025	La chica de la nieve: El juego del alma (The Snow Girl: The Soul Game)	Nacho Valdivia		
2025	Mar afuera	Carlos		
