= Fernando Navarro =

Fernando Navarro may refer to:

- Fernando Navarro (screenwriter) (born 1980), Spanish screenwriter and critic
- Fernando Navarro (Spanish footballer) (born 1982), Spanish football left-back
- Fernando Navarro (Mexican footballer) (born 1989), Mexican football right-back
