= La peste (TV series) =

- TV series poster
- Genre: Historical drama Crime drama
- Created by: Alberto Rodríguez; Rafael Cobos
- Written by: Rafael Cobos
- Directed by: Alberto Rodríguez
- Starring: Pablo Molinero; Paco León; Manolo Solo; Patricia López; Lupe del Junco
- Country of origin: Spain
- Original language: Spanish
- No. of seasons: 2
- No. of episodes: 12

Production
- Executive producer: Movistar+
- Running time: 50 minutes (approx.)
- Production company: Atípica Films

Original release
- Release: January 12, 2018 – November 15, 2019

La peste (The Plague) is a Spanish historical drama television series created by Alberto Rodríguez and Rafael Cobos for Movistar+. It tells a crime story set in the 16th century Seville during an outbreak of the bubonic plague. The series premiered on 12 January 2018 on Movistar+'s VOD service and on #0. Before it first aired, on 30 September 2017, it was announced that it had been renewed for a second season, which premiered on 15 November 2019.

== Premise ==
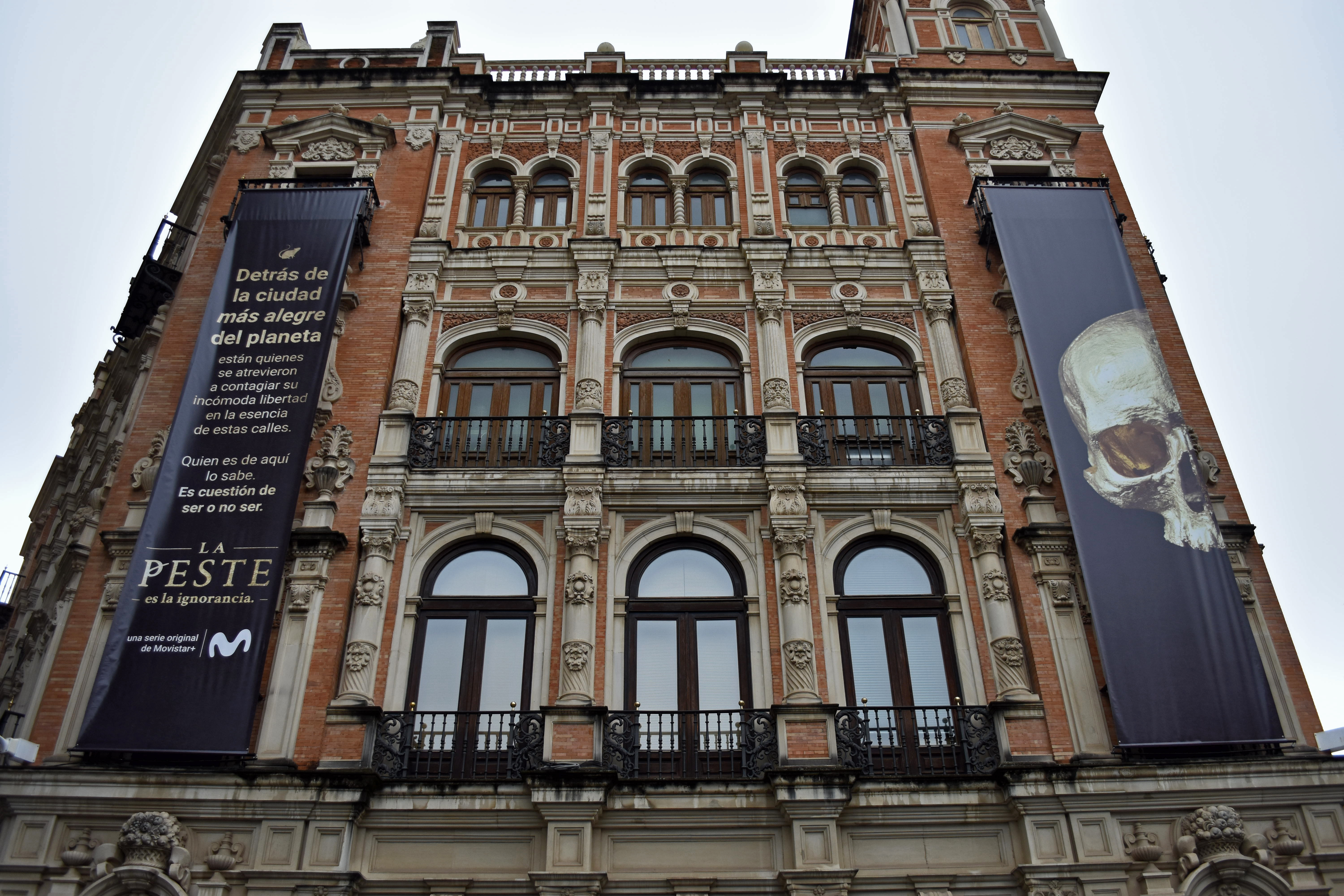
Telefónica headquarters in Seville, with an advertisement of La peste before its release.

"During an outbreak of the bubonic plague in the magnificent Seville of 1597, Mateo, a former soldier, returns, honouring his word to find and extract a dead friend’s son from the city. Previously, Mateo had been forced to flee the city to save his life, having been sentenced to death by the Inquisition for printing forbidden books. Before he can complete his task, Mateo is arrested by the Inquisitor’s bailiffs, who promise to pardon his life in exchange for solving a series of crimes of diabolic overtones being committed in Seville."

== Cast ==
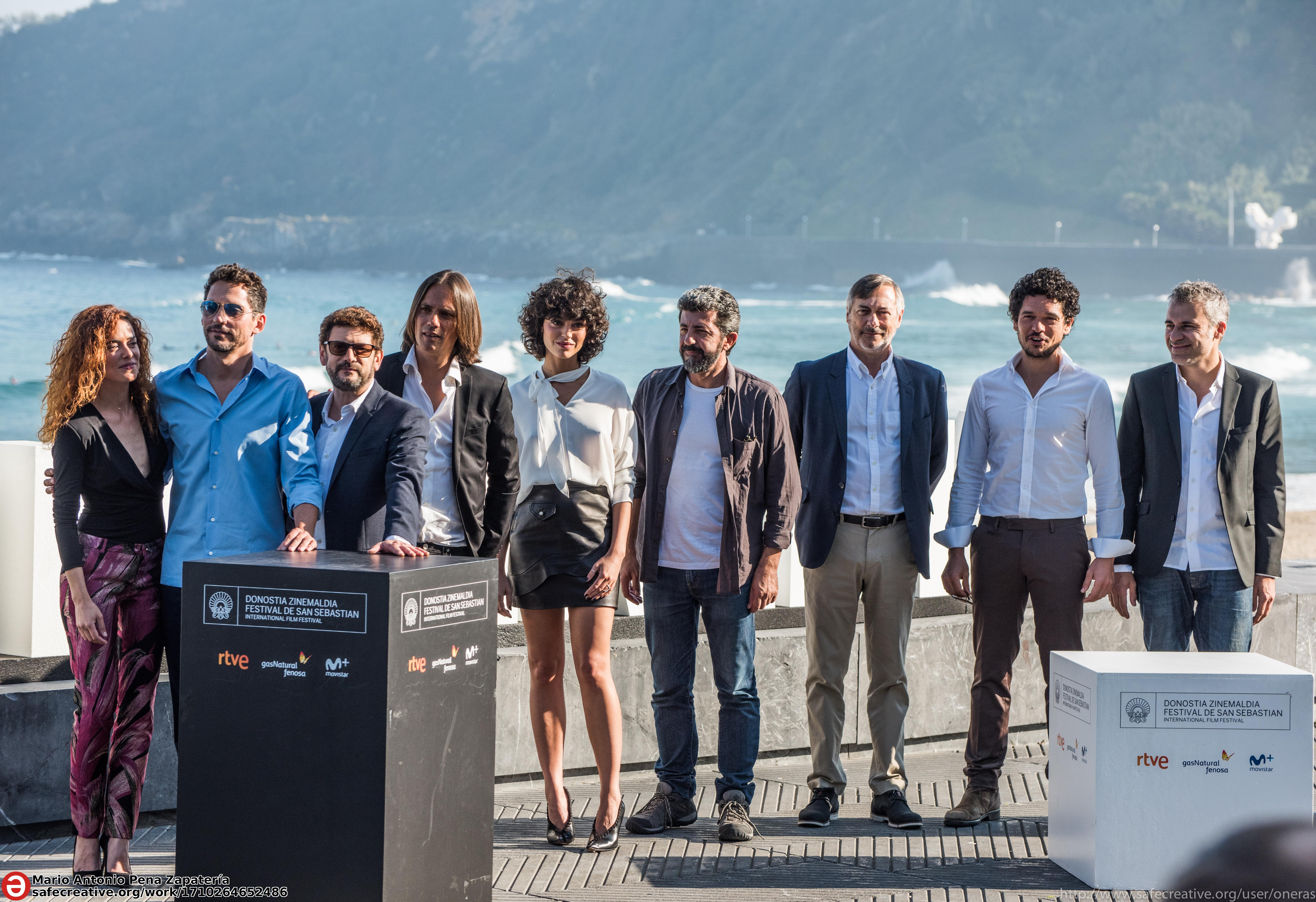
Cast of La peste during the 2017 San Sebastián International Film Festival.

- Pablo Molinero as the former printer Mateo Núñez
- Sergio Castellanos as Valerio Huertas, the son of Mateo's late friend Germán Larrea
- Paco León as Luis de Zúñiga
- Manolo Solo as Celso de Guevara
- Jesús Carroza as Baeza
- Tomás del Estal as the physician Nicolás Monardes
- Antonio Gil as Morata
- Cecilia Gómez as Eugenia, a prostitute
- Lupe del Junco as Leandra
- Patricia López Arnaiz as Teresa Pinelo, Señora Larrea
- Nya de la Rubia as Carmen Gálvez, Azuaga's mistress
- Paco Tous as Teresa Pinelo's administrator
- Manuel Morón as Arquímedes
- Victor Quintero as Quintero
- Antonio Dechent as Pedro Lanzas
- Miko Jarry as Alejandro Dresdener, the Mint's treasurer
- Óscar Corrales
- Carlo D'Ursi as Enzo
- Ignacio Herráez as an inebriated
- Alejandro López Estacio as the assassin Carmona
- Alejandro Pantany as Teresa's guard

Introduced in season 2

- Claudia Salas as Escalante
- Melina Matthews as Juana
- Luis Callejo as Conrado
- Julián Villagrán as El Flamenco
- Estefanía de los Santos as María de la O
- Federico Aguado as Pontecorvo

== Production ==
The second season was shot in Cuevas del Almanzora, Almería, from 15 October 2018 to 19 October.

== Episodes ==
=== Season 1 ===
No.	Title	Directed by
1	"La palabra (The word)"	Alberto Rodríguez
2	"El pacto (The pact)"	Alberto Rodríguez
3	"El impresor (The printer)"	Alberto Rodríguez
4	"El esclavo (The slave)"	Paco R. Baños
5	"El hijo (The son)"	Paco R. Baños
6	"El nuevo mundo (The New World)"	Alberto Rodríguez

=== Season 2 ===
No.	Title	Directed by
7	"El nuevo mundo (The New World)"	Alberto Rodríguez
8	"Escalante"	Alberto Rodríguez
9	"Pontecorvo"	David Ulloa
10	"Eugenia"	David Ulloa
11	"Conrado"	David Ulloa
12	"El viejo mundo (The Old World)"	David Ulloa
