= Golpes =

- Theatrical release poster
- Directed by: Rafael Cobos
- Screenplay by: Fernando Navarro; Rafael Cobos
- Produced by: Borja Pena; Emma Lustres; Daniel Pérez Astiárraga
- Starring: Jesús Carroza; Luis Tosar; Teresa Garzón
- Cinematography: Sergi Vilanova Claudín
- Edited by: Darío García
- Music by: Bronquio
- Production companies: Vaca Films; Grupo Tranquilo; Playtime
- Distributed by: A Contracorriente Films
- Release dates: 26 October 2025 (Seminci); 5 December 2025 (Spain)
- Running time: 101 minutes
- Countries: Spain; France
- Language: Spanish

Golpes is a 2025 thriller film directed by Rafael Cobos (in his feature-length directorial debut) and co-written by Cobos alongside Fernando Navarro. The cast is led by Luis Tosar and Jesús Carroza.

== Plot ==
Set in Seville in the 1980s, the film explores the clash between two brothers pitted against each other at opposite sides of the law, criminal Migueli and cop Sabino.

== Cast ==
- Jesús Carroza as Migueli
- Luis Tosar as Sabino
- Teresa Garzón as Angelita
- Cristina Alcázar as Rosa
- Carlos Bernardino as Edi
- Antonio Estrada as Perla
- Cristalino as el Nani
- Mafo as Osuna

== Production ==
Commenting about the project, Cobos stated that it is "all about committing to revitalising el cine quinqui, delving deeper into their very essence, albeit while striving to be different", while also concerning about a country in transition. He however also explained that in the end, the film had more of the "American cinema of the 1970s, or the French polar". The original screenplay was written by Cobos alongside Fernando Navarro. The film is a Vaca Films production alongside Grupo Tranquilo and Playtime, and it had the participation of Movistar Plus+, RTVE, and Canal Sur and the backing from ICAA, Junta de Andalucía, and Creative Europe MEDIA. Sergi Vilanova Claudín worked as cinematographer.

Shooting locations included Alcalá de Guadaíra.

== Release ==
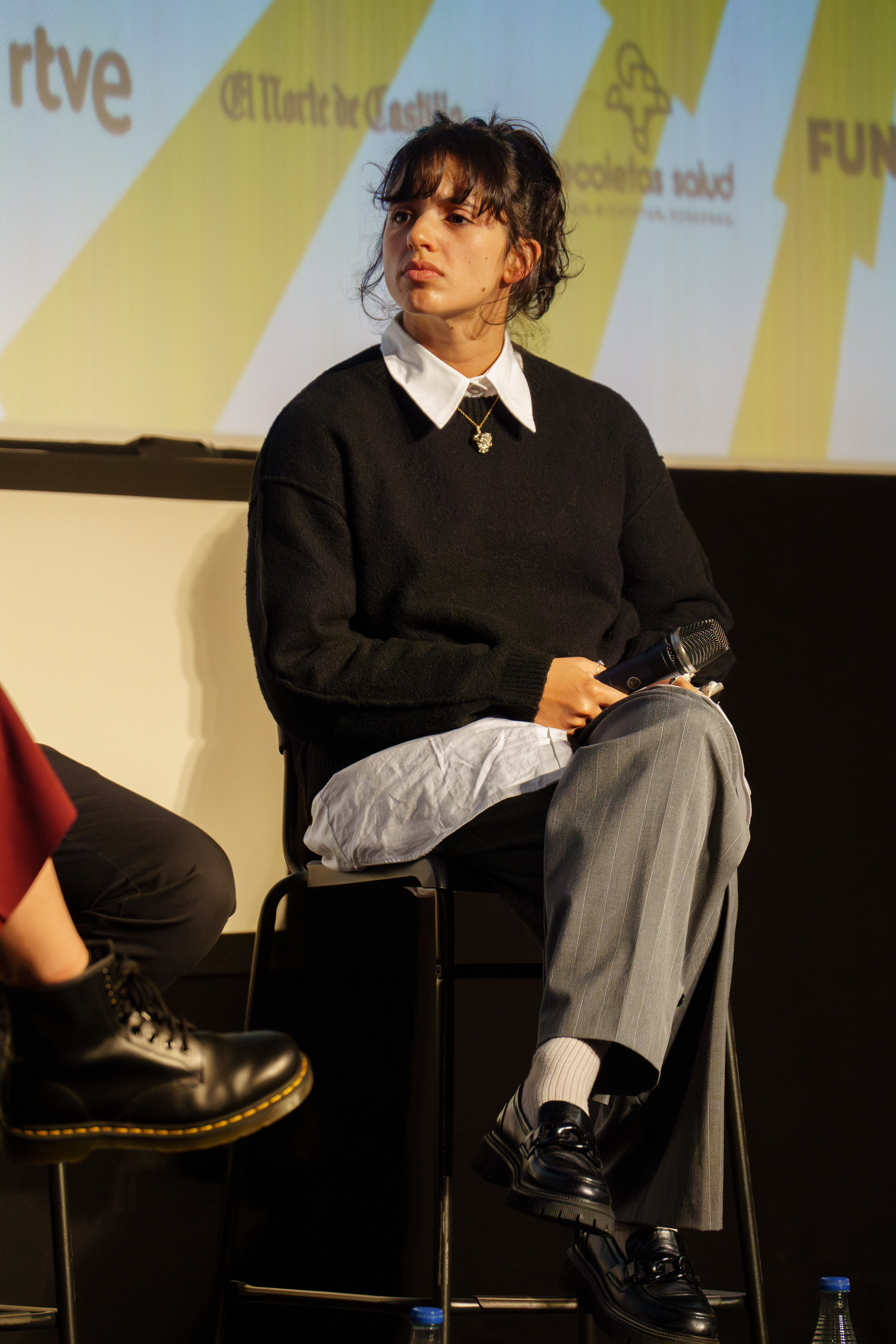
Teresa Garzón attending a panel at the 2025 Seminci

Golpes had its world premiere at the 70th Valladolid International Film Festival (Seminci) on 26 October 2025. It was also programmed in the 'Panorama Andaluz' slate of the 22nd Seville European Film Festival.

A Contracorriente Films released the film theatrically in Spain on 5 December 2025. The Paris-based company Playtime acquired international sales.

== Reception ==
Luis Martínez of El Mundo rated Golpes 4 out of 5 stars, declaring it a film "admirable in its ambition, feverish in every step it takes, and thrilling to the point of exhaustion".

Javier Ocaña of El País described Cobos' "distinguished" debut as "film about the physical defeat of two losers, and of the Spain that gave birth to them".

Raquel Hernández Luján of HobbyConsolas gave the film 70 points, positively mentioning the character design, the performances, and the setting, while negatively mentioning the lack of credibility of the overly spectacular action scenes contaminated by cliches imported from the U.S. film industry.

== Accolades ==
Year	Award	Category	Nominee(s)	Result	Ref.
2026	5th Carmen Awards	Best Film		Nominated	
2026	5th Carmen Awards	Best New Director	Rafael Cobos	Won	
2026	5th Carmen Awards	Best Original Screenplay	Rafael Cobos, Fernando Navarro	Nominated	
2026	5th Carmen Awards	Best Actor	Jesús Carroza	Won	
2026	5th Carmen Awards	Best Supporting Actor	Cristalino	Nominated	
2026	5th Carmen Awards	Best Supporting Actor	Antonio Estrada	Nominated	
2026	5th Carmen Awards	Best New Actor	Carlos Bernardino	Nominated	
2026	5th Carmen Awards	Best New Actress	Teresa Garzón	Won	
2026	5th Carmen Awards	Best Original Score	Bronquio	Won	
2026	5th Carmen Awards	Best Original Song	"La tierra esconde" by Bronquio, Rafael Cobos, Jaime Gastalver, and Teresa Garzón	Won	
2026	5th Carmen Awards	Best Editing	Darío García	Nominated	
2026	5th Carmen Awards	Best Costume Design	Lourdes Fuentes	Won	
2026	5th Carmen Awards	Best Sound	Jorge Marín	Nominated	
2026	5th Carmen Awards	Best Art Direction	Elena Soriano	Nominated	
2026	5th Carmen Awards	Best Makeup and Hairstyles	Yolanda Piña, Inés Díaz	Nominated	
2026	81st CEC Medals	Best New Director	Rafael Cobos	Nominated	
2026	81st CEC Medals	Best Supporting Actor	Luis Tosar	Nominated	

== See also ==
- List of Spanish films of 2025
