= The Left-Handed Son =

Spanish television series

- Promotional release poster
- Spanish: El hijo zurdo
- Created by: Rafael Cobos
- Teleplay by: Rafael Cobos
- Directed by: Paco R. Baños; Rafael Cobos
- Starring: María León; Tamara Casellas; Alberto Ruano; Marisol Membrillo; Hugo Welzel; Numa Paredes; Germán Rueda
- Music by: Julio de la Rosa
- Country of origin: Spain
- Original language: Spanish
- No. of seasons: 1
- No. of episodes: 6

Production
- Executive producers: Domingo Corral; Fran Araújo
- Cinematography: Daniela Cajías
- Editor: Luis Melgar
- Running time: 30 min
- Production companies: Atípica Films; Movistar Plus+

Original release
- Release: 27 April 2023

The Left-Handed Son (Spanish: El hijo zurdo) is a Spanish limited television series created by Rafael Cobos which stars María León and Hugo Welzel in a mother-son relationship thriller.

== Plot ==
The story takes place in Seville. Upon finding out in a police station about the neo-Nazi allegiances of her son Lorenzo, well-off Lola comes across working-class Maru (in a similar situation to Lola's) and her son Rodrigo.

== Cast ==
- María León como Lola
- Hugo Welzel como Lorenzo
- Alberto Ruano como Rodrigo
- Tamara Casellas como Maru
- Numa Paredes como Inés
- Germán Rueda como Loco
- Marisol Membrillo
- Susana Córdoba

== Production ==
Created by Rafael Cobos, the series is based on the novel El hijo zurdo by Rosario Izquierdo. Paco R. Baños joined Cobos in direction duties. The episodes were lensed by Daniela Cajías, whilst Julio de la Rosa was responsible for the music. Shooting took off in Seville in July 2022. It consists of 6 episodes featuring an average runtime of 30 minutes.

== Release ==
The Left-Handed Son was presented at Canneseries in April 2023. It debuted on Movistar Plus+ on 27 April 2023.

== Accolades ==
Year	Award	Category	Nominee(s)	Result	Ref.
2023	Canneseries	Best Short Form Series		Won	
