= The Heaven of Animals =

- Film poster
- Spanish: El cielo de los animales
- Directed by: Santi Amodeo
- Screenplay by: Santi Amodeo
- Based on: The Heaven of Animals by David J. Poissant
- Starring: Raúl Arévalo; Manolo Solo; Jesús Carroza; Paula Díaz; África de la Cruz; Claudio Portalo
- Cinematography: Leo Hermo
- Edited by: Darío García García
- Music by: Marcos Amodeo
- Production companies: Grupo Tranquilo PC; Cinelabs
- Distributed by: Maravillas Films
- Release dates: 20 March 2025 (Málaga); 9 May 2025 (Spain)
- Countries: Spain; Romania
- Language: Spanish

The Heaven of Animals (Spanish: El cielo de los animales) is a 2025 drama film written and directed by Santi Amodeo based on the short story collection by David James Poissant. Its cast features Raúl Arévalo, Manolo Solo, Jesús Carroza, Paula Díaz, África de la Cruz, and Claudio Portalo.

== Plot ==
The plot consists of standalone vignettes about loss.

== Cast ==
- Raúl Arévalo as Diego
- Paula Díaz as Amanda
- Jesús Carroza as Fran
- Manolo Solo as Benicio
- Diego Portalo as Darío
- África de la Cruz as Gracia

== Production ==
The film is a Spanish-Romanian co-production by Grupo Tranquilo PC alongside Cinelabs. It had the participation of Canal Sur and RTVE and the financial backing of Junta de Andalucía. Shooting locations in the province of Seville included Seville and Alcalá de Guadaíra.

== Release ==
The film was presented at the 28th Málaga Film Festival on 20 March 2025, vying for the Golden Biznaga. Distributed by Maravillas Films, it is scheduled to be released in about 50 Spanish theatres on 9 May 2025.

== Reception ==
Elsa Fernández-Santos of El País wrote that, with the film, Amodeo "returns to his most personal and interesting path, that place where the strange and the brief aspire to reveal something more".

Philipp Engel of Cinemanía rated the film 3½ out of 5 stars, writing that the element that allows the film to overcome its episodic nature the most is the aesthetics.

== Accolades ==
| Year | Award | Category | Nominee(s) | Result | Ref. |
|---|---|---|---|---|---|
| 2026 | 5th Carmen Awards | Best Film | | Nominated | |
| 2026 | 5th Carmen Awards | Best Director | Santi Amodeo | Nominated | |
| 2026 | 5th Carmen Awards | Best Adapted Screenplay | Santi Amodeo | Nominated | |
| 2026 | 5th Carmen Awards | Best Actress | Paula Díaz | Won | |
| 2026 | 5th Carmen Awards | Best Supporting Actress | África de la Cruz | Nominated | |
| 2026 | 5th Carmen Awards | Best Original Score | Marcos Amodeo | Nominated | |
| 2026 | 5th Carmen Awards | Best Original Song | "Ella es un ángel" by Marcos Amodeo | Nominated | |
| 2026 | 5th Carmen Awards | Best Costume Design | Ainhoa Badiola | Nominated | |
| 2026 | 5th Carmen Awards | Best Sound | Dani de Zayas, Carli Pérez Valero, Jorge Marín | Nominated | |
| 2026 | 5th Carmen Awards | Best Art Direction | Elena Soriano | Nominated | |
| 2026 | 5th Carmen Awards | Best Makeup and Hairstyles | Yolanda Caballero, Rocío Santana | Nominated | |

== See also ==
- List of Spanish films of 2025
