= The Stepmother's Bond =

- Theatrical release poster
- Spanish: Tras el verano
- Directed by: Yolanda Centeno
- Screenplay by: Jesús Luque; Yolanda Centeno
- Produced by: Marta Velasco; Tay Sánchez; Gonzalo Bendala
- Starring: Alexandra Jiménez; Juan Diego Botto; Ruth Gabriel; Álex Infantes
- Cinematography: José Luis Bernal
- Edited by: Antonio Frutos
- Music by: Pablo Cervantes
- Production companies: Áralan Films; Harry; After the summer AIE
- Distributed by: Alfa Pictures
- Release dates: 20 March 2025 (Málaga); 16 May 2025 (Spain)
- Country: Spain
- Language: Spanish

The Stepmother's Bond (Spanish: Tras el verano, lit. 'After Summer') is a 2025 Spanish drama film directed by Yolanda Centeno in her directorial debut feature. It stars Alexandra Jiménez and Juan Diego Botto alongside Ruth Gabriel and Álex Infantes.

== Plot ==
Paula lives with Raúl, developing a bond with her six-year-old stepson Dani. In the wake of the couple's separation, conflict ensues.

== Cast ==
- Alexandra Jiménez as Paula
- Juan Diego Botto as Raúl
- Ruth Gabriel
- Tamara Arias de Saavedra as Carmen
- Stéphanie Magnin as Esther
- Alicia Moreno as Julia
- Fran Cantos as Mauricio
- Álex Infantes as Dani

== Production ==
The Stepmother's Bond was produced by Áralan Films, Harry, and After the summer AIE with the association of La Goota Entertainment. It also had the participation of RTVE and Canal Sur, and backing from the Madrid regional administration, ICAA, and AA.II.CC. It was shot in between Málaga and Granada.

== Release ==
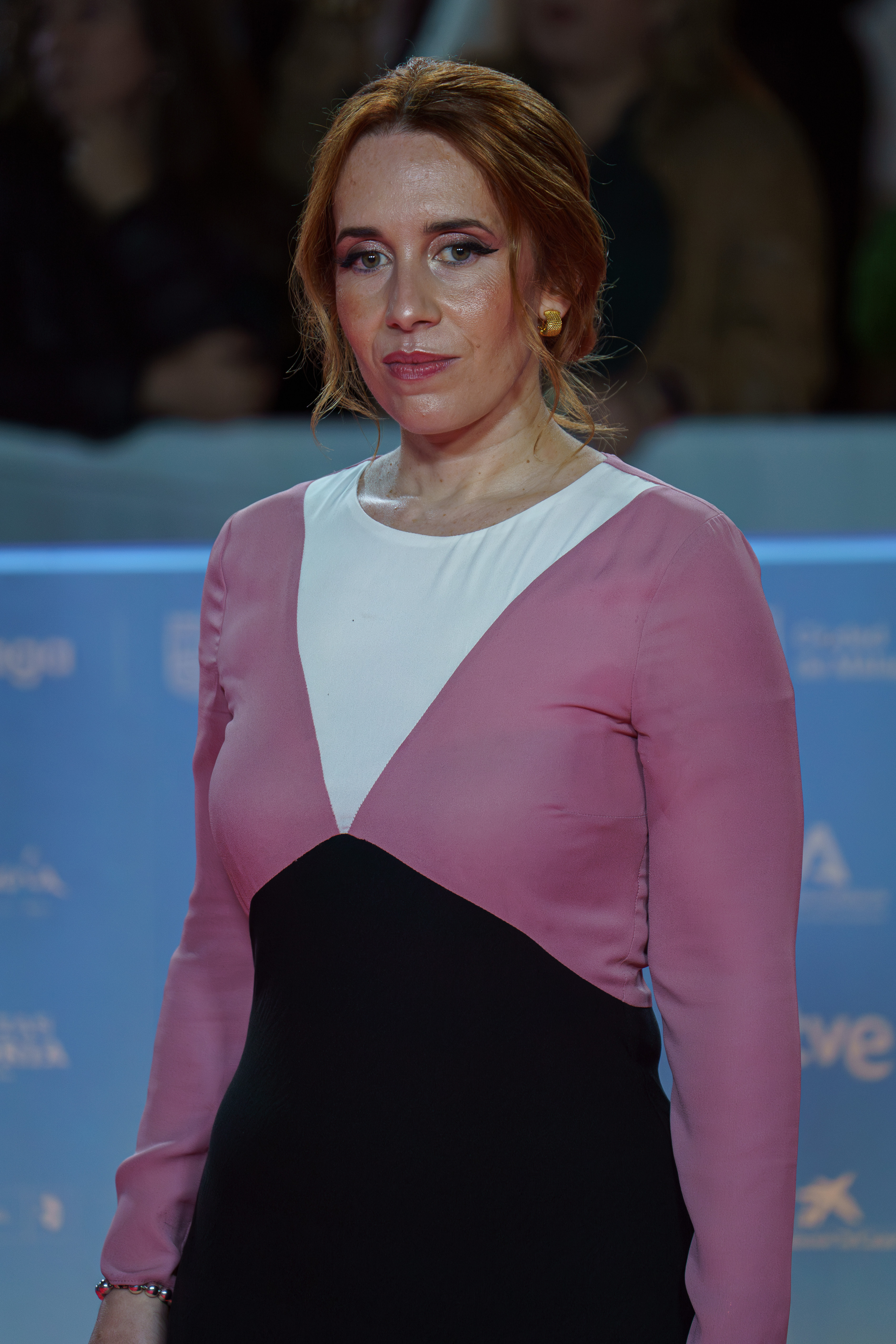
Centeno attending the 28th Málaga Film Festival

The film premiered in the official selection of the 28th Málaga Film Festival on 20 March 2025. Distributed by Alfa Pictures, it was released theatrically in Spain on 16 May 2025.

== Reception ==
Juan Pando of Fotogramas rated the film 4 out of 5 stars, writing that in addition to telling a story, it manages to "convey deep feelings and emotions, and [it] does so with images, without resorting to dialogue".

María Bescós of HobbyConsolas gave the film 55 points ('so-so'), positively mentioning "the approach to different family models" while citing how it "is more ambiguous than it needs to be" as a negative point.

== Accolades ==
Year	Award	Category	Nominee(s)	Result	Ref.
2026	5th Carmen Awards	Best New Director	Yolanda Centeno	Nominated	
2026	5th Carmen Awards	Best Adapted Screenplay	Adapted Screenplay	Nominated	
2026	5th Carmen Awards	Best Original Score	Pablo Cervantes	Nominated	
2026	5th Carmen Awards	Best Production Supervision	Javi Mateos	Nominated	

== See also ==
- List of Spanish films of 2025
