= La vida breve (TV series) =

- Promotional release poster
- Created by: Adolfo Valor; Cristóbal Garrido
- Directed by: Diego Núñez Irigoyen; Adolfo Valor
- Starring: Carlos Scholz; Alicia Armenteros; Javier Gutiérrez; Leonor Watling
- Country of origin: Spain
- Original language: Spanish
- No. of seasons: 1
- No. of episodes: 6

Production
- Executive producers: Cristóbal Garrido; Adolfo Valor; Antonio Asensio; Paloma Molina; Susana Herreras
- Cinematography: María Codina
- Production company: Zeta Studios

Original release
- Network: Movistar Plus+
- Release: 13 February – 20 February 2025

La vida breve (lit. 'The brief life') is a Spanish historical comedy miniseries created by Adolfo Valor and Cristóbal Garrido. Exploring the brief reign of Louis I, it stars Carlos Scholz along with Alicia Armenteros, Javier Gutiérrez, and Leonor Watling. A Movistar Plus+ original series, it was released in February 2025.

== Plot ==
Set in 18th-century Spain, in the year in which King Philip abdicated in favour of his son Louis, the plot explores the reign of the latter Bourbon monarch and his marriage to the princess Louise Élisabeth d'Orléans.

== Cast ==
- Javier Gutiérrez as Felipe V
- Carlos Scholz as Luis I
- Alicia Armenteros as Luisa de Orleans
- Leonor Watling as Isabel de Farnesio
- Carlos González as Farinelli
- Pepe Viyuela as John Higgins
- Bastien Ughetto as Louis de Rouvroy, duque de Saint-Simon
- Jorge Usón as Alberoni
- Eric Masip as Scotti
- Lalachús as Hortensia
- Héctor Carballo as Serrano
- Marta Hazas as Doña Eugenia

== Production ==
The series is a Zeta Studios production for Movistar Plus+. The episodes were directed by Adolfo Valor and Diego Núñez Irigoyen. They were lensed by María Codina.

Shooting locations included the Palace and Gardens of Quinta del Duque in El Pardo, the Royal Palace and Gardens in Aranjuez, the Royal Palace and Gardens in La Granja de San Ildefonso, the Palacio de Santoña, the Cartuja in Talamanca del Jarama, the Palacio de Fernán Núñez, La Granjilla estate in El Escorial, and the Prado Museum.

== Release ==
The series were presented at the 2nd edition of the Cádiz-based South International Series Festival in October 2024. The first three episodes debuted on Movistar Plus+ on 13 February 2025.

== Reception ==
Alberto Rey of El Mundo wrote that the "on paper, extremely unusual" cast "flows so well on screen that the precision and magic of its performers become indistinguishable", declaring that the performance of Javier Gutiérrez "recalls the best José Luis López Vázquez and Michel Piccoli".

Marta Medina of El Confidencial rated the series 4 out of 5 stars writing that it offers "a bold, irreverent, and contemporary look" at the reign of Louis I, welcoming the "enlightened and scatological comedy" as opposed to the regular dramatic, telenovela-like Spanish historical fiction.

Natalia Marcos of El País considered the series an example of the kind of "different, ambitious and shining" works that can be accomplished in Spanish television if provided with a good budget.

== Accolades ==
Year	Award	Category	Nominee(s)	Result	Ref.
2026	13th Feroz Awards	Best Comedy Series		Nominated	
2026	13th Feroz Awards	Best Supporting Actress in a Series	Leonor Watling	Nominated	
2026	34th Actors and Actresses Union Awards	Best Television Actress in a Secondary Role	Leonor Watling	Nominated	
2026	34th Actors and Actresses Union Awards	Best Television Actor in a Secondary Role	Carlos González	Nominated	
2026	34th Actors and Actresses Union Awards	Best Television Actor in a Minor Role	Héctor Carballo	Nominated	
2026	9th ALMA Awards	Best Screenplay in a Comedy Series	Cristóbal Garrido, Adolfo Valor	Nominated	

== See also ==
- 2025 in Spanish television
