= Carlos Scholz =

Spanish actor (born 1994)

- Scholz in 2025
- Born: 14 February 1994 (age 32); Málaga, Spain
- Education: Escuela Superior de Arte Dramático de Málaga
- Occupation: Actor
- Years active: 2019–present

Carlos Scholz (born 14 February 1994) is a Spanish actor.

== Biography ==
Scholz was born in the La Paz neighborhood of Málaga and raised in Huelin. He has three siblings. He is of German descent; his great-grandfather fled Germany during World War II and settled in Spain. He trained at the Escuela Superior de Arte Dramático de Málaga. He lives in Madrid.

== Filmography ==
=== Film ===
Year	Title	Role	Ref.
2022	Unfinished Affairs	Lucas Murillo	
2023	Awareness	Ian	
2023	Mi otro Jon	Carmelo	
2025	Virgins	Vicente	
2027	Blanco	TBA	

=== Television ===
Year	Title	Role	Notes	Ref.
2019	Toy Boy	Óscar	13 episodes	
2022	Feria: The Darkest Light	Raúl	8 episodes	
2022	Desconocidas	Pablo	4 episodes	
2022	Boundless	Charles V	6 episodes	
2023	Urban. La vida es nuestra	Rubén	6 episodes	
2025	La vida breve	Luis I	6 episodes	
2025	Perdiendo el juicio	Maxi	1 episode	
2025	Two Graves	Beltrán	3 episodes	
2026	Between Lands	Germán	10 episodes	
2026	El inmortal	Lolo	6 episodes	
