= Toro (film) =

- Poster
- Directed by: Kike Maíllo
- Written by: Fernando Navarro; Rafael Cobos
- Produced by: Enrique López Lavigne; Belén Atienza; Mercedes Gamero; Mikel Lejarza; Farruco Castromán; Sergi Casamitjana; Antonio Pérez; Axel Kuschevatzky; Eric Tavitian
- Starring: Mario Casas; Luis Tosar; José Sacristán
- Cinematography: Arnau Valls Colomer; Marino Scandurra; Julio Vergne
- Edited by: Elena Ruiz
- Music by: Joel Iriarte
- Production companies: Apache Films; Atresmedia Cine; Zircozine; Escándalo Films; Maestranza Films; Ran Entertainment
- Distributed by: Universal Pictures International Spain
- Release date: 22 April 2016 (Spain)
- Countries: Spain; France
- Language: Spanish

Toro is a 2016 action thriller film directed by Kike Maíllo starring Mario Casas, Luis Tosar and José Sacristán.

== Plot ==
All of the action takes place within 48 hours. Reuniting after 5 years, two brothers, Toro and López (the former has just got out of jail while the latter was fleeing from law enforcement alongside his daughter after a theft), embark on a journey across Andalusia.

== Cast ==
- Mario Casas as Toro
- Luis Tosar as López
- José Sacristán as Romano
- Ingrid García-Jonsson as Estrella
- Claudia Canal as Diana
- Luichi Macías as la Tita
- Nya de la Rubia as Isabelita
- José Manuel Poga as Ginés
- Christian Mulas as Arista
- Alberto López
- Manuel Salas
- Ignacio Herráez

== Production ==
The screenplay was co-penned by Fernando Navarro and Rafael Cobos. The film is an Apaches Entertainment (Apache Films), Atresmedia Cine, Zircozine, Escándalo Films, Maestranza Films and Ran Entertainment production, with the participation of Atresmedia, Movistar+, TVG and Canal Sur Televisión. Production also featured the association of Media 2013-Back up Media and it had support from ICAA, ICO, Junta de Andalucía, AGADIC and Xunta de Galicia. Shooting began by January 2015. It was shot in between Galicia (including Vigo, Pontevedra, Cerceda and Ourense) and Andalusia (including Almería, Málaga, Benalmádena, Torremolinos and Fuengirola).

== Release ==
Toro pre-screened in Vigo. It screened on 22 April 2016 as the opening film of the 19th Málaga Spanish Film Festival. Distributed by Universal Pictures International Spain, the film received a wide release in Spanish theatres on the same day.

== Reception ==
Pere Vall of Fotogramas rated the film with 4 out of 5 stars, highlighting Casas' performance (bringing brutality and tenderness together) as the best thing about the film, while missing more screentime from García-Jonsson.

Reviewing for El Periódico de Catalunya, Beatriz Martínez scored 3 out of 5 stars, finding satisfying that Toro breaks the self-imposed limits of political correctness in Spanish cinema, also considering that the film featured "one of the most conceptual visual designs of recent times", although she considered that eventually Kike Maíllo's filmmaking hids behind "impostured images lacking a true soul".

Lluís Bonet Mojica of La Vanguardia wrote that the cast (particularly Sacristán) was the film's best asset. He deemed however that the film does not quite come together, and that the non-stop action scenes fall into repetition and produce a certain weariness.

Jonathan Holland of The Hollywood Reporter wrote that while thundering along nicely and a "central trio of fine performances and satisfyingly breakneck pace", the film's "insistence on pushing all the right cinematic buttons means that below the surface, it doesn't quite stand up".

== Accolades ==
Year	Award	Category	Nominee(s)	Result	Ref.
2017	9th Gaudí Awards	Best Production Supervision	Toni Carrizosa	Nominated	
2017	9th Gaudí Awards	Best Visual Fffects	Rafa Galdó	Nominated	

== See also ==
- List of Spanish films of 2016
- List of French films of 2016
