= The Exiles (2024 film) =

- Theatrical release poster
- Spanish: Los Tortuga
- Directed by: Belén Funes
- Screenplay by: Belén Funes; Marçal Cebrian
- Produced by: Antonio Chavarrías; Olmo Figueredo González-Quevedo
- Starring: Antonia Zegers; Elvira Lara
- Cinematography: Diego Cabezas
- Edited by: Sergio Jiménez
- Music by: Paloma Peñarrubia
- Production companies: Oberon Media; La Claqueta PC; Quijote Films; Los Tortuga AIE
- Distributed by: A Contracorriente Films
- Release dates: September 2024 (TIFF); 23 May 2025 (Spain)
- Running time: 110 minutes
- Countries: Spain; Chile
- Languages: Spanish; Catalan

The Exiles (Spanish: Los Tortuga) is a 2024 drama film directed by Belén Funes. It stars Antonia Zegers and Elvira Lara. It is a Spanish-Chilean co-production.

The film premiered at the 49th Toronto International Film Festival in September 2024. It also screened at the 28th Málaga Film Festival in March 2025 ahead of its 23 May 2025 theatrical release in Spain by A Contracorriente Films.

== Plot ==
The plot follows a mother-daughter relationship, in which both women are mourning the passing of Julián. The mother (Delia, Julián's wife) is a Chilean taxi driver in Catalonia and the daughter (Anabel; Julián's daughter) maintains a close relationship to the land of Jaén, from which her father migrated. They both face eviction from their apartment in Collblanc, acquired by a vulture fund.

== Cast ==
- Elvira Lara as Anabel
- Antonia Zegers as Delia
- Mamen Camacho as aunt Inés
- Lorena Aceituno
- Pedro Castellano
- Pedro Romero

== Production ==
The film is a Spanish-Chilean co-production by Oberon Media, La Claqueta PC, Quijote Films, and Los Tortuga AIE. It was shot in between the provinces of Barcelona and Jaén in late 2023.

== Release ==
The Exiles was presented in September 2024 in the 'Centrepiece' section of the 2024 Toronto International Film Festival (TIFF). For its U.S. premiere, it made it to the 'Spanish Focus' programme of the 36th Palm Springs International Film Festival. It was also included in the main competition strand of the 28th Málaga Film Festival, where it was presented on 16 March 2025. It is expected to be released theatrically in Spain on 23 May 2025 by A Contracorriente Films.

== Reception ==
Michael Talbot-Haynes of Film Threat wrote that "there are times where The Exiles is so real that you can feel the air around the characters on the hairs of your arms".

Luis Martínez of El Mundo deemed the film to be the stunning confirmation of Funes, "a film that stains and stains itself", also assessing that "few endings are as rounded, exciting and perfect as that of Los Tortuga".

Begoña Piña of Cinemanía rated the film 4 out of 5 stars, declaring it "a mirror of reality, truth, of normal people".

Beatriz Martínez of Fotogramas rated The Exiles 4 out of 5 stars, citing "the magnificent performances of veteran Antonia Zegers and newcomer Elvira Lara" as the best thing about the film.

Manuel J. Lombardo of Diario de Sevilla rated The Exiles 4 out of 5 stars, writing that it "weaves its solid framework between the particular and the historical, between the personal and the collective (the political)", underpinning the matters and the manners of a "great film".

Sergi Sánchez of La Razón rated the film 4 out of 5 stars, praising how "it is moving without being sentimental, and portrays the wounds of grief away from the usual clichés".

== Accolades ==
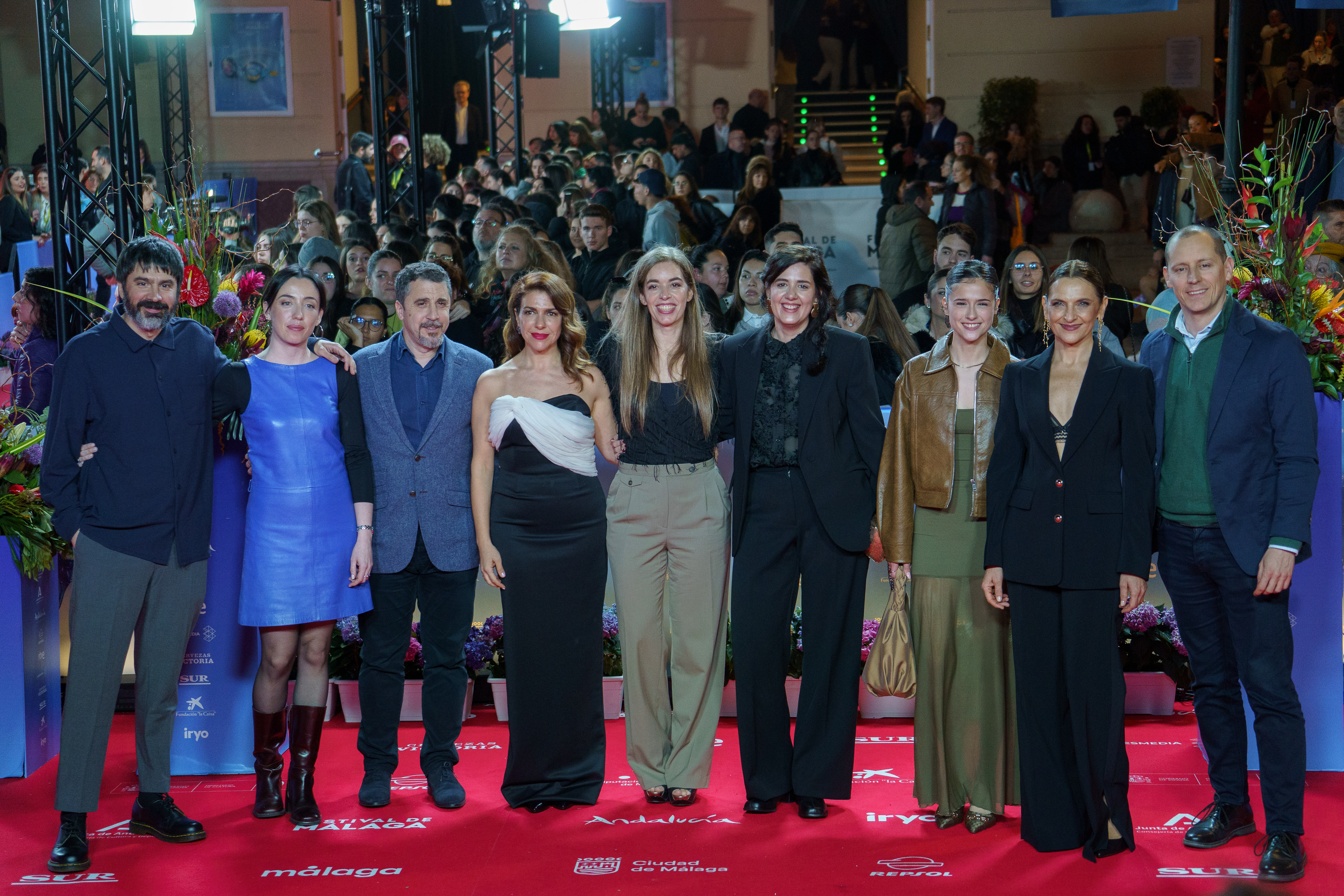
Cast and crew members attending the 28th Málaga Film Festival.

Year	Award	Category	Nominee(s)	Result	Ref.
2025	28th Málaga Film Festival	Silver Biznaga for Special Jury Prize		Won	
2025	28th Málaga Film Festival	Silver Biznaga for Best Director	Belén Funes	Won	
2025	28th Málaga Film Festival	Silver Biznaga for Best Screenplay	Belén Funes, Marçal Cebrian	Won	
2026	5th Carmen Awards	Best Film		Nominated	
2026	5th Carmen Awards	Best Supporting Actress	Mamen Camacho	Nominated	
2026	5th Carmen Awards	Best Production Supervision	Manolo Limón	Won	
2026	5th Carmen Awards	Best Sound	Diana Sagrista, Abraham F. Apresa	Nominated	
2026	5th Carmen Awards	Best Special Effects	Amparo Martínez Barco	Nominated	
2026	18th Gaudí Awards	Best Non-Catalan Language Film		Nominated	
2026	18th Gaudí Awards	Best Original Screenplay	Belén Funes, Marçal Cebrian	Nominated	
2026	18th Gaudí Awards	Best New Performance	Elvira Lara	Nominated	
2026	40th Goya Awards	Best Actress	Antonia Zegers	Nominated	
2026	40th Goya Awards	Best New Actress	Elvira Lara	Nominated	

== See also ==
- List of Spanish films of 2025
