= César Vicente =

Spanish actor (born 1997)

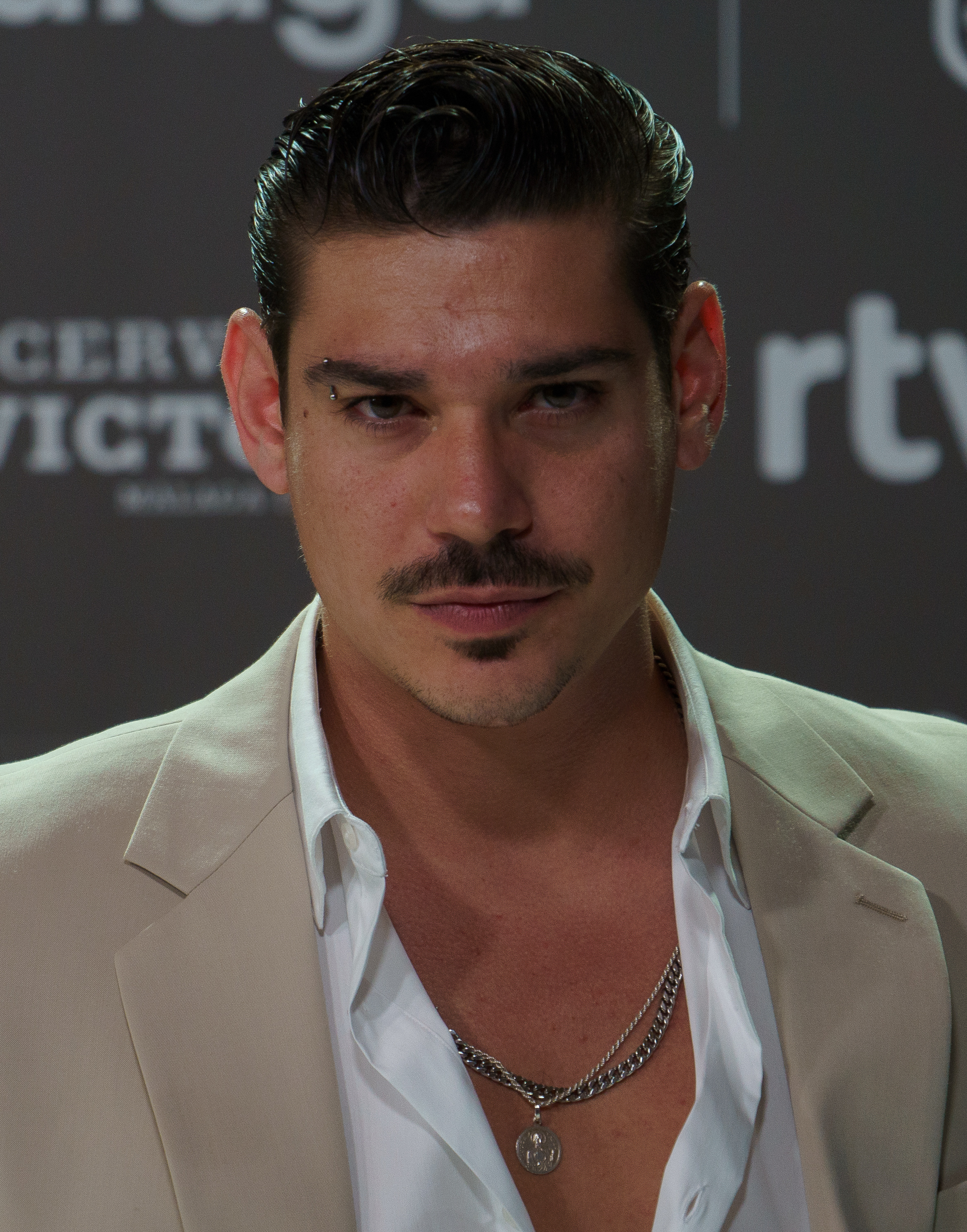
- Vicente in 2025
- Born: 1997 (age 28–29); Tomares, Andalusia, Spain
- Occupation: Actor

César Vicente (born 1997) is a Spanish actor.

== Life and career ==
Born in 1997 in Tomares (where he was also raised), Vicente trained at the Viento Sur acting school in Triana. For his screen debut in Pain and Glory (2019), he portrayed the construction worker arousing the sexual desire of Salvador Mallo. For his role, he earned a Best New Actor nomination at the 29th Actors and Actresses Union Awards. He later acted in the drama series A Different View, playing a schizophrenic gardener, and other television roles in Hernán (as a young Hernán Cortés), Amar es para siempre, and Asuntos internos. In 2025, he acted in the films Virgins and Los Tigres (for which he earned another Best New Actor nomination at the 5th Carmen Awards).

His father, César Vicente Sanz, died in the October 2026 Toledo train collision.
