= Virgins (2025 film) =

- Theatrical release poster
- Spanish: Vírgenes
- Directed by: Álvaro Díaz Lorenzo
- Written by: Álvaro Díaz Lorenzo
- Produced by: Antonio P. Pérez; Borja Pena; Leonel Vieira
- Starring: Carlos Scholz; César Vicente; Xavi Caudevilla; Natalia Azahara; Cristina Kovani; Paco Tous; Boré Buika; Antonio Dechent
- Cinematography: Valentín Álvarez
- Edited by: Verónica Callón
- Music by: Pilar Onares
- Production companies: Vírgenes la película AIE; Spal Films; Vaca Films; Volf Entertainment
- Distributed by: Filmax
- Release dates: 17 March 2025 (Málaga); 20 June 2025 (Spain)
- Countries: Spain; Portugal
- Language: Spanish

Virgins (Spanish: Vírgenes) is a 2025 comedy film written and directed by Álvaro Díaz Lorenzo. It stars Carlos Scholz, César Vicente, Xavi Caudevilla, Natalia Azahara, and Cristina Kovani. It is a Spanish-Portuguese co-production.

== Plot ==
In 1968, three young males from Seville about to turn 20 (Honorio, Rafa, and Vicente) travel to Torremolinos with the prospect of losing their virginity with Swedish women in mind.

== Cast ==
- Carlos Scholz as Vicente
- César Vicente as Rafa
- Xavi Caudevilla as Honorio
- Natalia Azahara as Carmen
- Cristina Kovani as Ana
- Paco Tous as don Fernando
- Boré Buika as Guille
- Antonio Dechent as comisario
- Joaquín Núñez as Eduardo
- Diego Paris as Ramiro
- Marco d'Almeida as Hans
- Júlia Palha as Astrid
- Katrina Mayer as Frida

== Production ==
The film is a Spal Films (Antonio P. Pérez) co-production with Vaca Films (Borja Pena), Vírgenes la película AIE and Volf Entertainment Lisboa with the collaboration of ICAA, A.A.II.C.C., RTVE and RTVA. Shooting was already underway in Seville in October 2024. In addition to Torremolinos, shooting locations on the Costa del Sol included Málaga, Marbella, Mijas, Benalmádena, and Fuengirola.

== Release ==
Virgins premiered at the 28th Málaga Film Festival in March 2025. Filmsharks acquired international sales rights. Distributed by Filmax, it is set to be released theatrically in Spain on 20 June 2025.

== Reception ==
Víctor A. Gómez of La Opinión de Málaga lamented that "after ten minutes you are already tired of listening to the actors forcing their Andalusian accents and trying to be funny".

Paula Pardo Luz of Cinemanía rated the film 2 out of 5 stars, pointing out that its dramatic side and the political discourse "causes us to get out of the film" with the "dialogue coming across as too forced and simplistic".

Javier Ocaña of El País described the film as an attempt to resurrect the landismo, but lamenting that, in its historical implausibility, the film "has no value whatsoever. Not even that of comedy", unlike the films of Pedro Lazaga or Mariano Ozores.

== Accolades ==
Year	Award	Category	Nominee(s)	Result	Ref.
2026	5th Carmen Awards	Best New Actress	Cristina Kovani	Nominated	
2026	5th Carmen Awards	Best Art Direction	Pilar Angulo	Nominated	
2026	5th Carmen Awards	Best Special Effects	Amparo Martínez Barco, Joaquín Ortega	Nominated	

== See also ==
- List of Spanish films of 2025
