= Los Tigres =

- Theatrical release poster
- Directed by: Alberto Rodríguez
- Written by: Rafael Cobos; Alberto Rodríguez
- Produced by: Koldo Zuazua; Juan Moreno; Guillermo Sempere; Domingo Corral
- Starring: Antonio de la Torre; Bárbara Lennie; Joaquín Núñez
- Cinematography: Pau Esteve Birba
- Edited by: José M. G. Moyano
- Music by: Julio de la Rosa
- Production companies: Movistar Plus+; Kowalski Films; Feelgood Media; Mazagón AIE; Le Pacte
- Distributed by: Buena Vista International (Spain); Le Pacte (France)
- Release dates: 20 September 2025 (Zinemaldia); 31 October 2025 (Spain); 31 December 2025 (France)
- Countries: Spain; France
- Language: Spanish

Los Tigres is a 2025 thriller film directed by Alberto Rodríguez from a screenplay co-written with Rafael Cobos starring Antonio de la Torre and Bárbara Lennie.

The film premiered at the 73rd San Sebastián International Film Festival in September 2025 ahead of its Spanish theatrical release on 31 October 2025 by Buena Vista International. It won Best Special Effects at the 40th Goya Awards.

== Plot ==
The plot follows siblings Antonio and Estrella, both connected to the sea and in a dire economic plight, the former being a professional diver in industrial environments and the latter a seabed researcher. Their lives take a turn upon the finding of a cocaine stash in the hull of a freighter in the port of Huelva.

== Cast ==
- Antonio de la Torre as Antonio
- Bárbara Lennie as Estrella
- Joaquín Núñez as Gordo
- José Miguel Manzano Bazalo "Skone"
- César Vicente as Nico
- Silvia Acosta as Cinta

== Production ==
The screenplay was written by Alberto Rodríguez alongside his regular co-scribe Rafael Cobos. The film is a Movistar Plus+, Kowalski Films, Feelgood Media, Mazagón Films AIE, and Le Pacte co-production. Principal photography began on 6 May 2024. Shooting locations in the province of Huelva included the CEPSA petrochemical plant, the Port of Huelva, and the Odiel Marshland. Footage was also shot at the Ciudad de la Luz studio in Alicante.

== Release ==
Los Tigres was presented at the 73rd San Sebastián International Film Festival on 20 September 2025, in competition for the Golden Shell. The film was released theatrically in Spain on 31 October 2025 by Buena Vista International. Le Pacte scheduled a 31 December 2025 theatrical rollout in France.

== Reception ==
Quim Casas of El Periódico de Catalunya rated the film 4 out of 5 stars, assessing that, similarly to Marshland, it stands out for the "elegant" way in which it portrays characters "who are not always dependent on the plot [...] in which they find themselves involved".

Philipp Engel of Cinemanía rated the film 4 out of 5 stars, declaring it as "an impeccable genre film, supported by a crime plot that is as solid as it is minimalist".

Luis Martínez of El Mundo rated the film 4 out of 5 stars, considering it to be Alberto Rodríguez's most ambitious and deep project.

Éric Neuhoff of Le Figaro deemed the film to be a "a successful blend of Ken Loach and The Silent World".

== Accolades ==
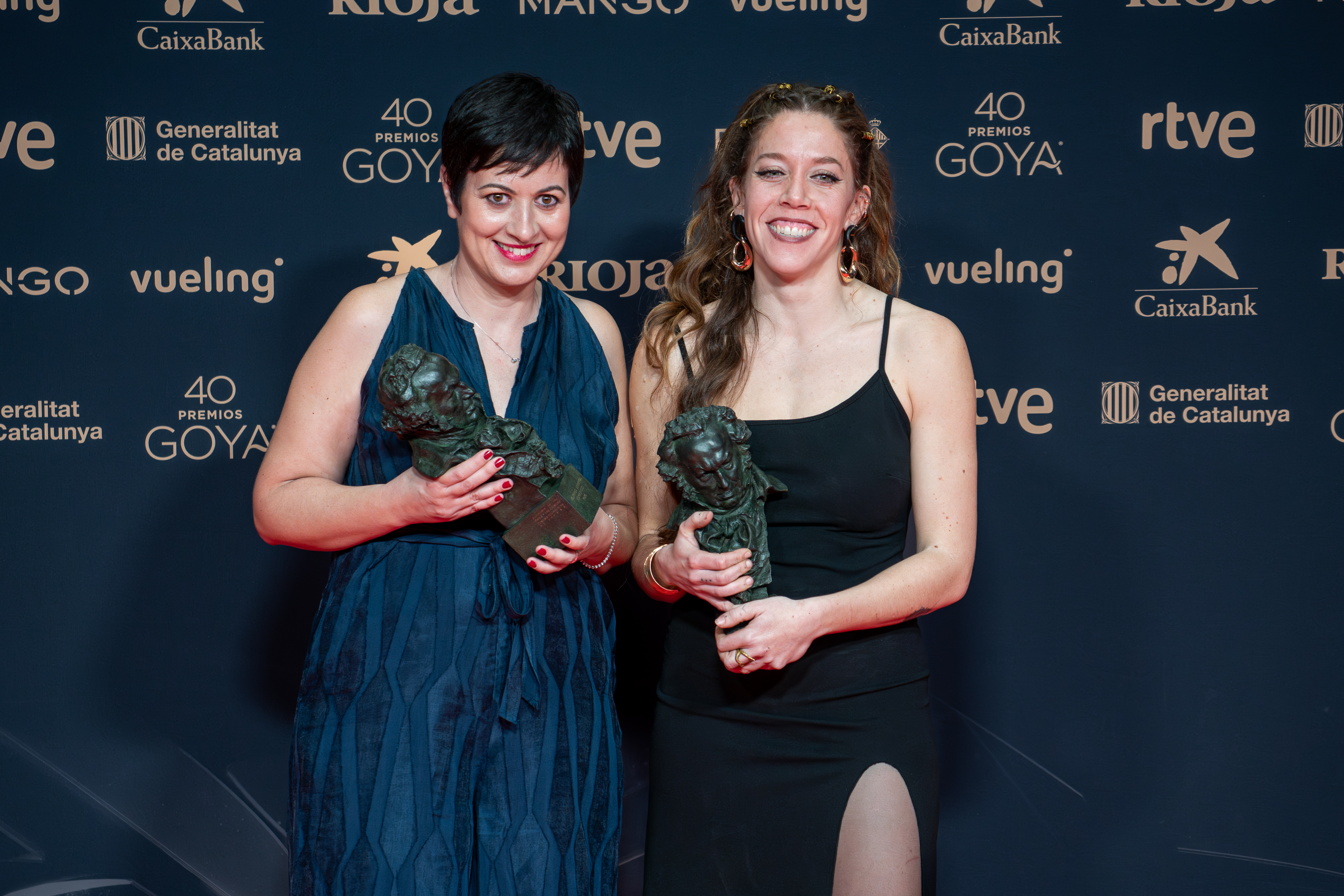
Special effects artists Ana Rubio and Paula Gallifa Rubia holding their Goya Award.

| Year | Award | Category | Nominee(s) | Result | Ref. |
|---|---|---|---|---|---|
| 2025 | 73rd San Sebastián International Film Festival | Jury Prize for Best Cinematography | Pau Esteve Birba | Won | |
| 2026 | 13th Feroz Awards | Best Supporting Actor in a Film | Joaquín Núñez | Nominated | |
| 2026 | 5th Carmen Awards | Best Film | | Won | |
| 2026 | 5th Carmen Awards | Best Director | Alberto Rodríguez | Won | |
| 2026 | 5th Carmen Awards | Best Original Screenplay | Rafael Cobos, Alberto Rodríguez | Won | |
| 2026 | 5th Carmen Awards | Best Actor | Antonio de la Torre | Nominated | |
| 2026 | 5th Carmen Awards | Best Supporting Actor | Joaquín Núñez | Won | |
| 2026 | 5th Carmen Awards | Best Supporting Actress | Silvia Acosta | Won | |
| 2026 | 5th Carmen Awards | Best New Actor | César Vicente | Nominated | |
| 2026 | 5th Carmen Awards | Best New Actor | Jesús del Moral | Nominated | |
| 2026 | 5th Carmen Awards | Best Original Score | Julio de la Rosa | Nominated | |
| 2026 | 5th Carmen Awards | Best Cinematography | Pau Esteve | Won | |
| 2026 | 5th Carmen Awards | Best Editing | José M. García Moyano | Won | |
| 2026 | 5th Carmen Awards | Best Costume Design | Fernando García | Nominated | |
| 2026 | 5th Carmen Awards | Best Sound | Dani de Zayas | Won | |
| 2026 | 5th Carmen Awards | Best Art Direction | Pepe Domínguez | Won | |
| 2026 | 5th Carmen Awards | Best Makeup and Hairstyles | Yolanda Piña, Félix Terrero | Won | |
| 2026 | 81st CEC Medals | Best Actress | Bárbara Lennie | Nominated | |
| 2026 | 81st CEC Medals | Best Cinematography | Pau Esteve Birba | Nominated | |
| 2026 | 81st CEC Medals | Best Editing | José M. G. Moyano | Nominated | |
| 2026 | 81st CEC Medals | Best Music | Julio de la Rosa | Nominated | |
| 2026 | 40th Goya Awards | Best Cinematography | Pau Esteve Birba | Nominated | |
| 2026 | 40th Goya Awards | Best Editing | José M. G. Moyano | Nominated | |
| 2026 | 40th Goya Awards | Best Original Score | Julio de la Rosa | Nominated | |
| 2026 | 40th Goya Awards | Best Art Direction | Pepe Domínguez del Olmo | Nominated | |
| 2026 | 40th Goya Awards | Best Production Supervision | Begoña Muñoz Corcuera | Nominated | |
| 2026 | 40th Goya Awards | Best Sound | Daniel de Zayas, Gabriel Gutiérrez, Candela Palencia | Nominated | |
| 2026 | 40th Goya Awards | Best Special Effects | Paula Gallifa Rubia, Ana Rubio | Won | |
| 2026 | 13th Platino Awards | Best Special Effects | Ana Rubio, Paula Gallifa Rubia | Nominated | |

== See also ==
- List of Spanish films of 2025
- List of French films of 2025
