= Mar de plástico =

Spanish crime drama television series

- Genre: Crime drama Serial drama
- Created by: Juan Carlos Blázquez; Alberto Manzano; Almudena Ocaña; Pablo Tébar
- Starring: Rodolfo Sancho; Belén López; Pedro Casablanc; Patrick Criado; Federico Aguado; Andrea del Río; Eva Martín; Lucho Fernández; Jesús Castro; Andrea Ros; Nya de la Rubia
- Country of origin: Spain
- Original language: Spanish
- No. of seasons: 2
- No. of episodes: 26

Production
- Production companies: Boomerang TV; Atresmedia

Original release
- Network: Antena 3
- Release: September 22, 2015 – December 19, 2016

Mar de plástico (English: Plastic Sea) is a Spanish crime drama television series produced by Boomerang TV for Atresmedia. It airs on Atresmedia's main channel Antena 3. The series focuses on the investigation of a murder in the fictional town of Campoamargo, set in an area of the province of Almería known as the "plastic sea" due to the numerous greenhouses that cover it, and the interracial conflicts that arise in the greenhouses. The pilot episode aired on 22 September 2015, being simulcast on Antena 3, Neox, Nova and Mega.

In November 2015, Antena 3 announced that the series had been renewed for a second season, which was later confirmed as the last one.

== Plot ==
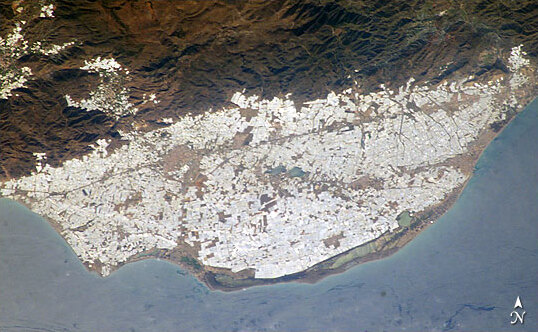
A satellite view of the greenhouses area known as the "sea of plastic", in the Poniente Almeriense, where the series is set.

=== Season 1 ===
On a hot night in Campoamargo, Almería, Ainhoa Sánchez (Mara López), daughter of the town's mayor, heads to a date in the greenhouse area, known as the "Plastic Sea". Suddenly there is a power outage and Ainhoa is brutally attacked and killed in the dark. The next morning, the crops are watered by her blood and nobody knows anything about the disappeared girl. The same day, Héctor Aguirre (Rodolfo Sancho), sergeant of the Civil Guard and chief of the Judicial Police, happens to arrive in Campoamargo and begins the crime investigation. A crime many people had reasons to commit, and few of them have alibis. Aguirre, a veteran of Afghanistan with severe anger management issues, knows he is in for the hardest investigation of his career.

=== Season 2 ===
After the murderer of Ainhoa Sánchez is caught and imprisoned, Campoamargo seems to have regained its calm - but not for long: Marta Ezquerro (Belén López), a local engineer, is found dead in a container with signs of having received a hard blow to the head. And she might not be the only victim; a new killer has emerged in the town and nobody is safe.

== Main cast ==
=== Regular ===
- Rodolfo Sancho as Héctor Aguirre
- Belén López as Marta Ezquerro
- Pedro Casablanc as Juan Rueda
- Nya de la Rubia as Lola Requena
- Lucho Fernández as Salva Morales
- Patrick Criado as Fernando Rueda
- Jesús Castro as Lucas Morales (season 1)
- Federico Aguado as Sergio Rueda
- Andrea del Río as Pilar Salinas
- Yaima Ramos as Fara Okembe (season 1)
- Will Shephard as Khaled Okembe
- Eva Martín as Carmen Almunia (season 1)
- Lisi Linder as Agneska Spassky
- Máximo Pastor as Nacho Torres
- Jesús Carroza as Manuel "Lolo" Requena
- Andrea Ros as Mar Sánchez (season 1)
- José Chaves as Amancio Morales (season 1)
- Luka Peros as Eric (season 1)
- Miquel Fernández as Pablo Torres
- Adelaida Polo as Sol Requena (season 2)
- Florin Opritescu as Vlad Dragić (season 2)

=== Recurring ===
- Mara López as Ainhoa Sánchez
- Julio Vélez as Antonio Requena
- Elías Pelayo as Francisco Salinas
- Boré Buika as Teodoro
- Gala Évora as Remedios "Reme"
- Marina Esteve as Paula
- Ángela Vega as Manuela
- Oti Manzano as Asunción
- Alain Hernández as Jorge Díaz
- Jorge Suquet as Álvaro Conesa
- Verónica Moral as Marisa
- Fernando Cayo as Luis San José

== Episodes ==
Season	Episodes	Originally released		Average viewership	Average share
Season	Episodes	First released	Last released	Average viewership	Average share
1	13	September 22, 2015	December 22, 2015	3 755 000	21,4%
2	13	September 12, 2016	December 19, 2016	2 891 000	17,5%

=== Season 1 ===
No. overall	No. in season	Title	Original release date	Spain viewers (millions)
1	1	"La sed de los recuerdos"	September 22, 2015	4.967 (29.2%)
2	2	"Fumigación"	September 29, 2015	4.052 (23.9%)
3	3	"Reconstrucción"	October 6, 2015	3.745 (21.5%)
4	4	"La prueba"	October 13, 2015	3.815 (21.5%)
5	5	"La cámara"	October 20, 2015	3.732 (21.5%)
6	6	"Confianza"	October 27, 2015	3.542 (20.6%)
7	7	"La mano"	November 2, 2015	3.728 (20.2%)
8	8	"El pasado"	November 9, 2015	3.686 (20.6%)
9	9	"La fosa"	November 16, 2015	3.592 (20.7%)
10	10	"Fuera de combate"	November 23, 2015	3.659 (20.6%)
11	11	"Boris E."	November 30, 2015	3.904 (22.1%)
12	12	"Se cierra el círculo"	December 15, 2015	3.648 (20.6%)
13	13	"La caza del hombre"	December 22, 2015	3.687 (20.3%)

Note: Episode 1 was simulcast on Antena 3, Neox, Nova and Mega.

=== Season 2 ===
No. overall	No. in season	Title	Original release date	Spain viewers (millions)
14	1	"El regreso"	September 12, 2016	2.824 (17.8%)
15	2	"Paraíso terrenal"	September 19, 2016	2.757 (17.4%)
16	3	"Cowboy de medianoche"	September 26, 2016	2.752 (17%)
17	4	"La trituradora"	October 3, 2016	2.777 (16.9%)
18	5	"Quid pro quo"	October 10, 2016	2.775 (16.9%)
19	6	"Pit Bull"	October 17, 2016	3.013 (17.6%)
20	7	"Vlad"	October 24, 2016	2.913 (17.2%)
21	8	"El día de la ira"	November 7, 2016	2.748 (16.6%)
22	9	"Marta"	November 14, 2016	2.950 (17.7%)
23	10	"Yo confieso"	November 21, 2016	3.010 (17.8%)
24	11	"Cazado"	November 28, 2016	2.966 (17.5%)
25	12	"Cristina"	December 12, 2016	2.870 (16.5%)
26	13	"La última palabra"	December 19, 2016	3.232 (20.6%)
