= Nya de la Rubia =

Spanish singer and actress

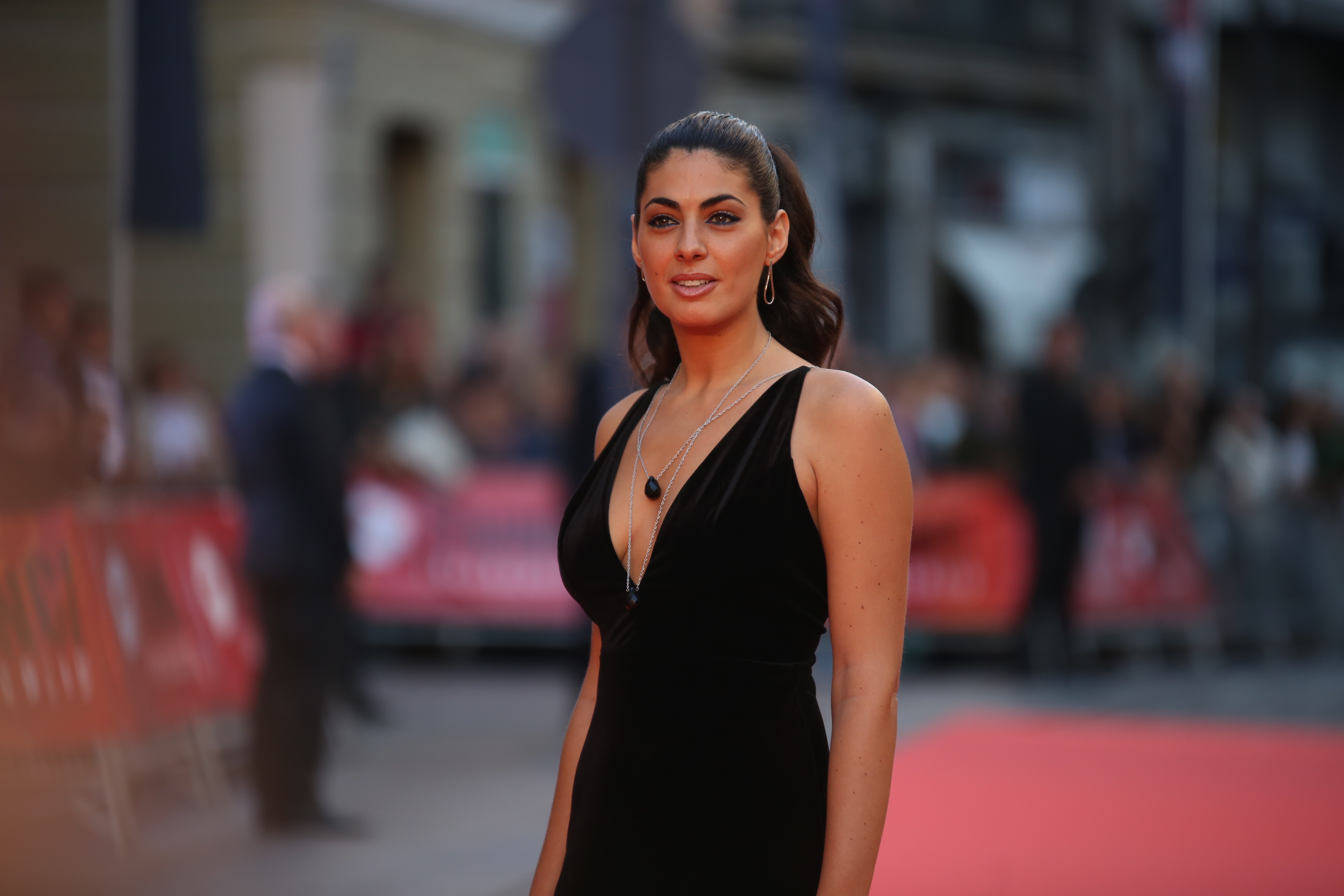
- At the 2016 Seminci's red carpet
- Born: Isabel Estefanía de la Rubia Badante; 27 August 1986 (age 39); Seville, Andalusia, Spain
- Occupations: Singer; actress; songwriter

Isabel Estefanía de la Rubia Badante (born 27 August 1986), known artistically as Nya de la Rubia, is a Spanish singer and actress. She earned popularity for her performance in Mar de plástico.

== Biography ==
Isabel Estefanía de la Rubia Badante was born in Seville on 27 August 1986. Daughter of a copla singer (mother) and a flamenco guitarist (father), she was raised in the neighborhood of Triana. She began to write her own songs at age 16–17.

In the wake of taking acting training starting in 2005, she made her television acting debut in Andalusian regional soap opera Arrayán in 2007. She released an album in 2013. In addition to vocals, she plays piano, guitar and cajón. She and her single Callejuelos appeared in musical television series Dreamland (2014).

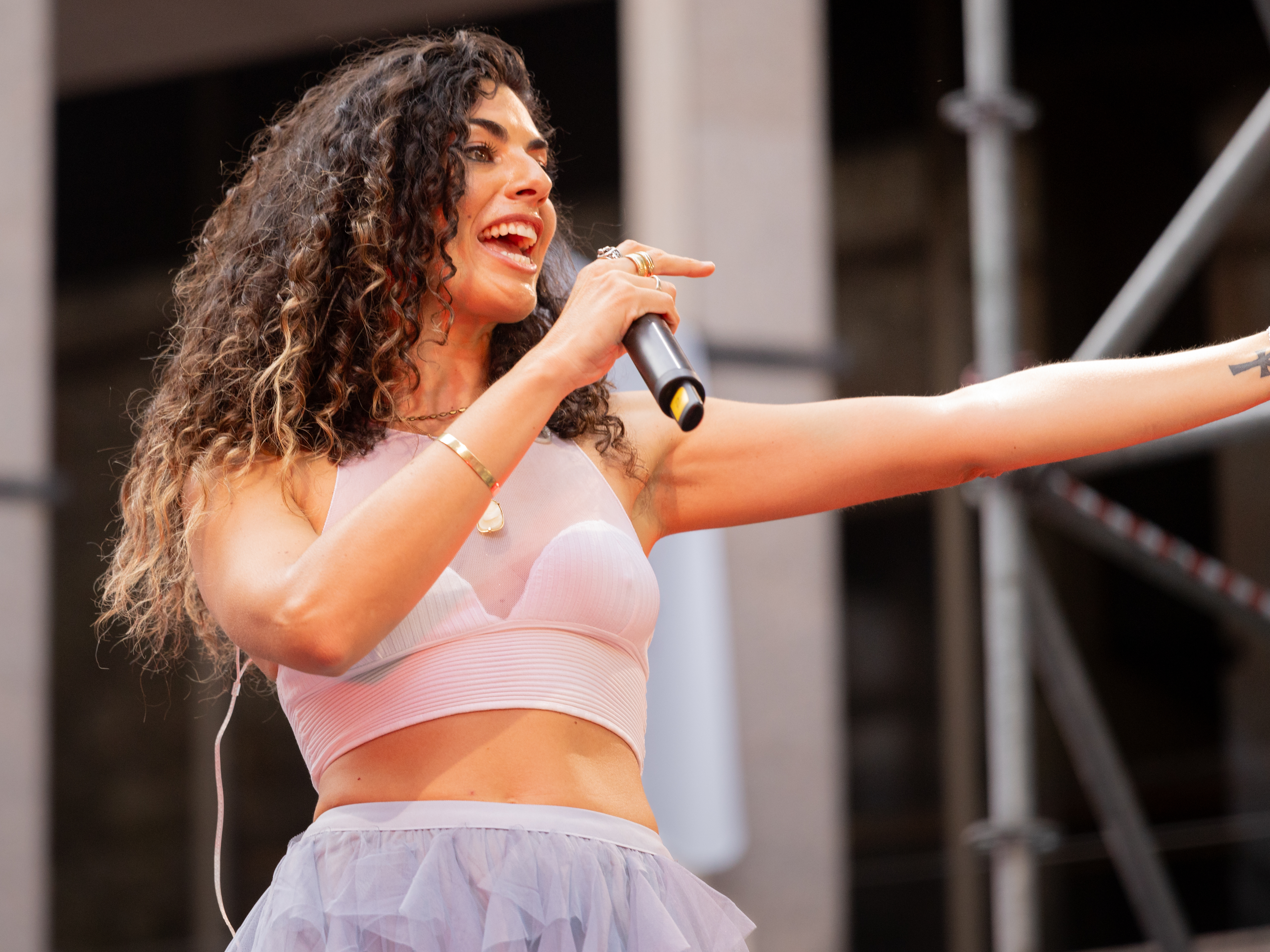
Nya de la Rubia performing in Madrid during Madrid Pride 2024.

She landed a breakthrough role by playing civil guard agent Lola Requena in crime drama series Mar de plástico (2015–16), also composing the series' main theme "Ya no puedo más". She has since featured in series such as El Continental, La peste, Gigantes, Secretos de Estado, Servir y proteger, and Mariachis. She also featured in a villain role in Kike Maíllo's action thriller film Toro (2016). She performed (and composed alongside Baby Noel) Perdóname, señor's main theme "Perdóname". In 2022, she released an EP titled Raíces featuring a fusion of flamenco and urbano.

== Filmography ==
=== Film ===
Film
Year	Title	Role	Notes	Ref
2016	Toro	Isabelita		

Television
Year	Title	Role	Notes	Ref
2015–16	Mar de plástico	Lola Requena		
2018	La peste	Carmen		
2018	El Continental			
2019	Gigantes		Introduced in season 2	
2020	Servir y proteger	Ainhoa		
