= Below Zero (2021 film) =

2021 Spanish action film

- Promotional poster
- Spanish: Bajocero
- Directed by: Lluís Quílez
- Written by: Fernando Navarro; Lluís Quílez
- Produced by: Josep Amorós; Pedro Uriol
- Starring: Javier Gutiérrez; Karra Elejalde; Luis Callejo; Patrick Criado; Andrés Gertrúdix; Isak Férriz; Miquel Gelabert; Florin Opritescu; Édgar Vittorino
- Edited by: Antonio Frutos
- Music by: Zacarías M. de la Riva
- Production companies: Morena Films; Amorós Producciones; Film Factory
- Distributed by: Netflix
- Release date: 29 January 2021
- Running time: 106 minutes
- Country: Spain
- Language: Spanish

Below Zero (Spanish: Bajocero) is a 2021 Spanish action thriller film directed by Lluís Quílez, written by Fernando Navarro and Lluís Quílez. It stars Javier Gutiérrez, Karra Elejalde, Luis Callejo and Patrick Criado. The plot concerns a team of police officers who are transporting prisoners in an armored transport truck who are ambushed by a hijacker, who demands the release of one of the prisoners.

Netflix reported that the movie had been viewed by 47 million accounts in its first month on the service.

== Plot ==
An injured man is pursued through a wood at night and caught by his pursuer. Unable to disclose the location of a missing woman, the attacker buries him alive.

Police officer Martín starts a new job driving a prisoner transport vehicle at night, partnered with Officer Montesino. Montesino deliberately humiliates some of the prisoners during the transfer, but Martín intervenes to prevent violence.

While en route, the transport vehicle loses sight of, and radio contact with, the escorting police car due to fog. The transport vehicle is then abruptly halted by a spiked strip on the road. Montesino gets out to investigate, but does not return. When Martín follows, he finds Montesino apparently dead, and the police car overturned, with the officers killed.

A sniper starts firing at Martín, who returns fire, but he is shot in the leg. He makes it back to the transport vehicle and seeks refuge in the prisoners' section. One prisoner frees himself and tries to overpower Martín, but he defends himself with his weapon. Gasoline is poured into two cells through the ventilation grilles and set ablaze, forcing Martín to open the cells to save the prisoners, but one man has already died.

The freed prisoner releases the others, and a message is heard through the intercom that Martín's gun is actually empty, and urges the prisoners to escape. However, prisoner Nano beats another man to death, claiming that he was the one who orchestrated the hijack. Nano obtains Martín's key.

The hijacker, Miguel, has commandeered the transport vehicle and threatens to kill everyone unless they hand over Nano. A struggle ensues to obtain the key, but Nano swallows it. Martín is overpowered and locked up with Nano while the others try to open the exit door. Martín recognises one prisoner, Ramis, as a former band member from his wedding.

Miguel starts driving the truck, while the prisoners try to find a means to escape. To this end, Rei enters a storage compartment under the truck and tries to open a panel. Meanwhile, Montesino has revived and pursues the truck, after finding Miguel's jeep with photos of his missing daughter. Montesino catches up with the truck and fires at it, but is forced off the road and killed in the collision. Rei also dies in the storage compartment, impaled by a screw during the swerving of the vehicle.

Martín interrogates Nano about the situation; he claims ignorance but mentions someone named Chino, his childhood friend. Miguel drives the truck onto a frozen lake and shoots the ice, causing the vehicle to sink, while he walks away. Martín convinces Ramis to release him to find an emergency exit. Martín, Nano, and Ramis escape, but Golum dies from the cold.

Nano runs away while Martín and Ramis part ways. Martín reaches a nearby village where he hears gunfire. Miguel is firing at Nano from inside a building, and Martín confronts him. Miguel reveals his motive for seeking revenge; he had allowed his young daughter to visit a fair with a friend. Nano and Chino (the man being pursued in the opening scene) got her drunk and, after raping her, tortured her until she died.

Martín refuses to let Miguel kill Nano, and they struggle for the shotgun. Martín gains control, but Miguel pursues Nano. Martín intervenes, shooting Nano in the hand, demanding the location of Miguel's daughter. Nano confesses that he and Chino buried her in a well on a farm. As he reveals this, a police rescue helicopter arrives.

In the final scene, Martín collects his belongings from his locker at headquarters and walks away from the building, and presumably also his police career.

== Cast ==
- Javier Gutiérrez as Martín
- Karra Elejalde as Miguel
- Luis Callejo as Ramis
- Andrés Gertrúdix as Golum
- Isak Férriz as Montesinos
- Édgar Vittorino as Rei
- Miquel Gelabert as Pardo
- Florin Opritescu as Mihai
- Patrick Criado as Nano
- Carla Chiorazzo as Bárbara
- Eva Manjón as Elena
- Ángel Solo
- Marc Padró
- Jon Rod
- Àlex Monner as Chino (special collaboration)

== Reception ==
On the review aggregator website Rotten Tomatoes, 88% of 8 critics' reviews are positive, with an average rating of 5.90/10.

== See also ==
- List of Spanish films of 2021
