= Subsuelo =

- Theatrical release poster
- Directed by: Fernando Franco
- Screenplay by: Fernando Franco; Begoña Arostegui
- Based on: Subsuelo; Marcelo Luján
- Produced by: Koldo Zuazua; Gonzalo Salazar-Simpson; Fernando Franco
- Starring: Julia Martínez; Diego Garisa; Nacho Sánchez; Iñigo de la Iglesia; Montse Díez; Itzan Escamilla; Sonia Almarcha
- Cinematography: Santiago Racaj
- Edited by: Miguel Doblado
- Music by: Maite Arroitajauregi Aranburu
- Production companies: Lazona; Kowalski Films; Ferdydurke Films; Blizzard Films AIE
- Distributed by: LaZona Pictures
- Release dates: 25 October 2025 (Seminci); 7 November 2025 (Spain)
- Countries: Spain; Uruguay
- Language: Spanish

Subsuelo is a 2025 psychological thriller film directed by Fernando Franco and co-written by Begoña Arostegui based on the novel Subsuelo by Marcelo Luján. It stars Julia Martínez and Diego Garisa.

== Plot ==
Twin siblings Eva and Fabián, about to come of age, are involved in a tragic incident whose circumstances are seemingly known only by them and their mother Mabel.

== Cast ==
- Julia Martínez as Eva
- Diego Garisa as Fabián
- Nacho Sánchez as Ramón
- Sonia Almarcha as Mabel
- Itzan Escamilla as Javier
- Montse Díez as Ana
- Íñigo de la Iglesia as Alberto
- Elvira Cuadrupani
- Lucía de la Puerta
- Gerardo de Pablos
- Jorge Cabrera

== Production ==
Adapted by Begoña Arostegui and Fernando Franco, the screenplay is based on the novel Subsuelo by Marcelo Luján. Luján reportedly supervised several script revisions and attended the set "a couple of times". The film is a Lazona, Kowalski Films, Ferdydurke Films and Blizzard Films AIE production, with the participation of RTVE, EiTB, Canal Sur, and Movistar Plus+, funding from ICAA and backing from Diputación Foral de Gipuzkoa.

The film was shot in between the Madrid region, Biscay, and the province of Segovia. Santiago Racaj worked as cinematographer.

== Release ==
Subsuelo had its world premiere at the 70th Valladolid International Film Festival (Seminci) on 25 October 2025. It was also programmed at the 49th São Paulo International Film Festival. Distributed by LaZona Pictures, it was released theatrically in Spain on 7 November 2025. Elle Driver handled international sales.

== Reception ==
Javier Ocaña of El País assessed that after Wounded, Dying and The Rite of Spring, Franco hits rock bottom in the expression of the human condition, delivering yet "another film to make you want to slit your wrists, another magnificent film".

Manuel J. Lombardo of Diario de Sevilla gave the film 3 stars, billing it as "a journey clouded by the very forbidden and corrosive substance that runs through it", concluding that sometimes, "one could say that Subsuelo could also have been a film by the canceled and recoverable Carlos Vermut".

Pere Vall of Fotogramas rated the film 4 out of 5 stars, singling out "the aesthetic elegance and the harshness of the story" as the best things about the film.

== Accolades ==
Year	Award	Category	Nominee(s)	Result	Ref.
2025	70th Valladolid International Film Festival	Best Screenplay	Fernando Franco, Begoña Aróstegui	Won	
2026	5th Carmen Awards	Best Director	Fernando Franco	Nominated	
2026	5th Carmen Awards	Best Adapted Screenplay	Fernando Franco	Won	
2026	5th Carmen Awards	Best Costume Design	Esther Vaquero	Nominated	
2026	5th Carmen Awards	Best Makeup and Hairstyles	María Liaño, Rada Mora	Nominated	

== See also ==
- List of Spanish films of 2025
