= Fernando Franco =

Spanish film editor

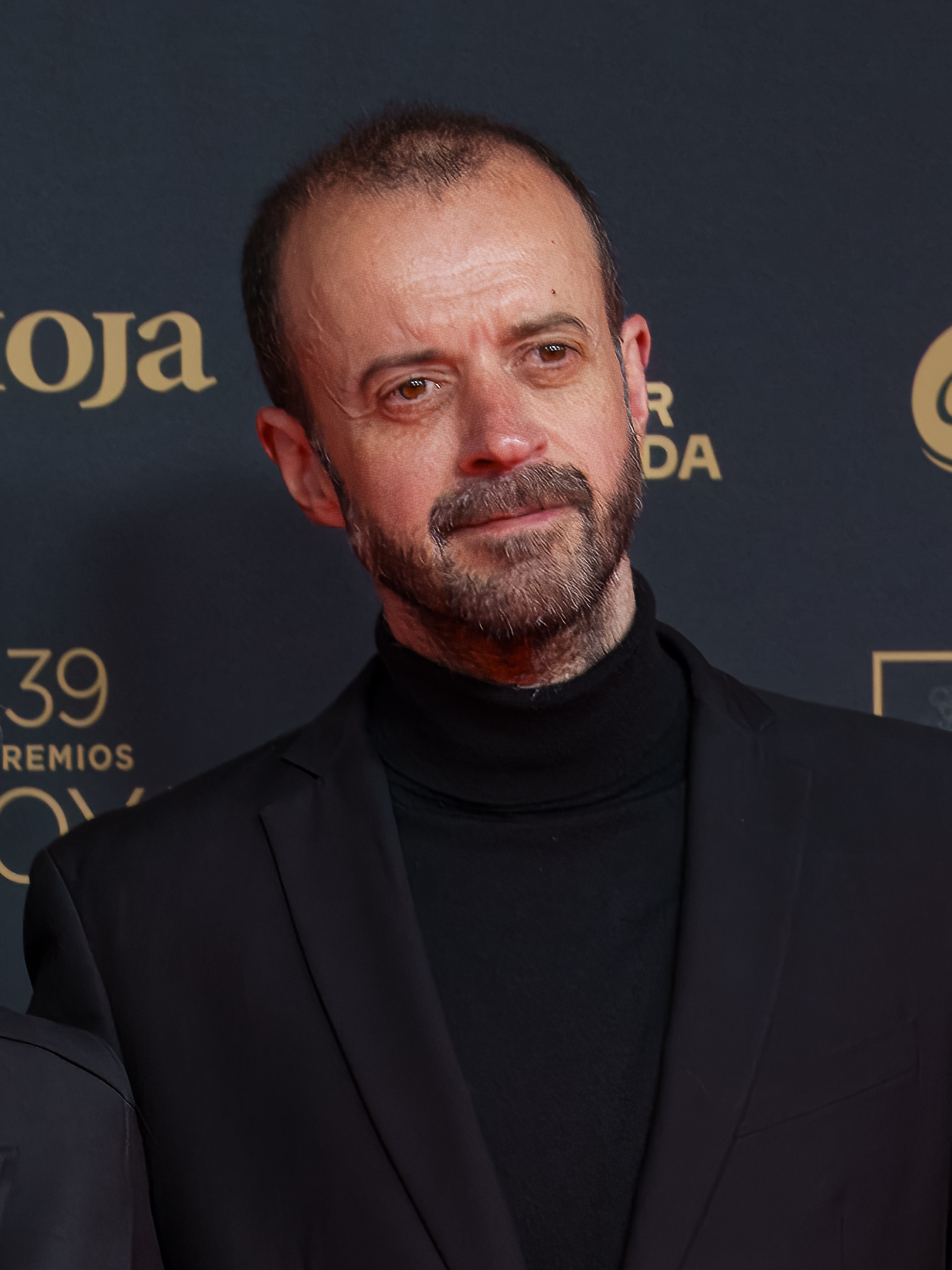
- Franco in 2025
- Born: Fernando Franco García; 1976 (age 49–50); Seville, Spain
- Occupations: Film editor; director; screenwriter; producer

Fernando Franco García (born 1976) is a Spanish film editor, director and screenwriter.

== Biography ==
Fernando Franco García was born in Seville in 1976. He earned a licentiate degree in audiovisual communication from the University of Seville and a diploma in film editing from the ECAM. Already a seasoned film editor, his feature film directorial debut Wounded (2013) earned him a Goya Award for Best New Director and a nomination to the Goya Award for Best Original Screenplay. His debuting directorial efforts were followed by Dying (2017), The Rite of Spring (2022), Subsuelo, and The Light (2026).

== Accolades ==
Year	Award	Category	Work	Result	Ref.
2013	27th Goya Awards	Best Editing	Snow White	Nominated	
2014	1st Feroz Awards	Best Director	Wounded	Nominated	
2014	28th Goya Awards	Best New Director	Wounded	Won	
2014	28th Goya Awards	Best Original Screenplay	Wounded	Nominated	
2017	31st Goya Awards	Best Editing	May God Save Us	Nominated	
2019	33rd Goya Awards	Best Editing	Journey to a Mother's Room	Nominated	
2021	35th Goya Awards	Best Editing	Black Beach	Nominated	
2024	3rd Carmen Awards	Editing	Robot Dreams	Nominated	
2024	38th Goya Awards	Best Editing	Robot Dreams	Nominated	
2025	39th Goya Awards	Best Editing	Little Loves	Nominated	
