= Jesús Carroza =

Spanish actor

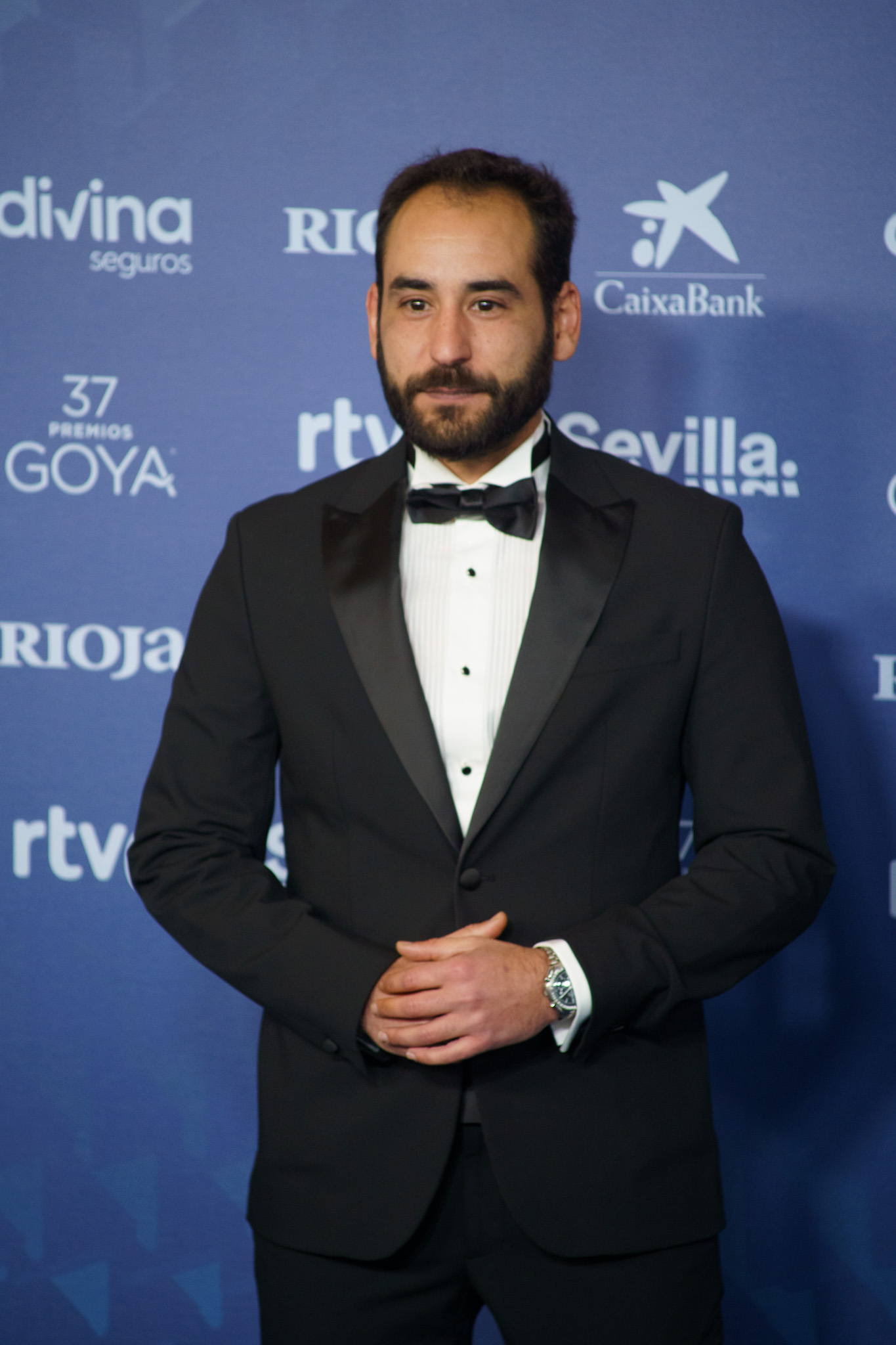
- Carroza in 2023
- Born: Jesús Carroza Rodríguez; 7 November 1987 (age 38); Seville, Andalusia, Spain
- Occupation: Actor

Jesús Carroza Rodríguez (born 7 November 1987) is a Spanish actor who won the Goya Award for Best New Actor for his role as Richi in 7 Virgins (2005).

== Biography ==
Jesus Carroza Rodríguez was born in Seville on 7 November 1987, the youngest of four siblings. At the age of 16, he attended a casting that took place in his high school, and he was chosen from over 3,000 applicants to land his role as Richi in 7 Virgins, the movie that started his acting career and for which he won the Best New Actor Goya award in 2006

== Filmography ==
=== Television ===
Year	Title	Role	Notes	Ref.
2006	Mis adorables vecinos	El troncho		
2015	Mar de plástico	Manuel "Lolo" Requena		
2016	Buscando el norte	Arturo Aragonés		
2018	El día de mañana (What the Future Holds)	Mateo Moreno		
2019	La Peste	Baeza		

=== Film ===
Year	Title	Role	Notes	Source
2005	7 Virgins	Richi		
2007	Déjate caer	Kevin Manuel		
2008	Che	Eduardo	Part 2: Guerrilla	
2009	Celda 211	Elvis		
2010	After	Jesús		
2010	La mula (The Mule)	Churri		
2012	Un mundo cuadrado	Esteban		
2012	Miel de naranjas (Orange Honey)	Fernando		
2012	Unit 7	Yonki		
2014	El Niño	El Compi		
2014	Marshland	Miguel		
2022	Modelo 77 (Prison 77)	El Negro		
2025	Tierra de nadie (Barren Land)	Benito "El Yeye"		
2025	El cielo de los animales (The Heaven of Animals)	Fran		
2025	Golpes	Migueli		
2025	Un hijo (A Son)	Roberto		

== Accolades ==
Year	Award	Category	Work	Result	Ref.
2006	20th Goya Awards	Best New Actor	7 Virgins	Won	
2006	15th Actors and Actresses Union Awards	Best New Actor	7 Virgins	Nominated	
2006	CEC Medals	Best New Actor	7 Virgins	Nominated	
2015	2nd Feroz Awards	Best Supporting Actor	El Niño	Nominated	
2015	70th CEC Medals	Best Supporting Actor	El Niño	Nominated	
2019	6th Feroz Awards	Best Supporting Actor in a TV Series	What the Future Holds	Nominated	
2023	10th Feroz Awards	Best Supporting Actor in a TV Series	Offworld	Nominated	
2023	10th Feroz Awards	Best Supporting Actor in a Film	Prison 77	Nominated	
2023	2nd Carmen Awards	Best Supporting Actor	Prison 77	Won	
2024	3rd Carmen Awards	Best Supporting Actor	Love & Revolution	Won	
2026	5th Carmen Awards	Best Actor	Golpes	Won	
