= Rafael Cobos =

Spanish screenwriter and playwright

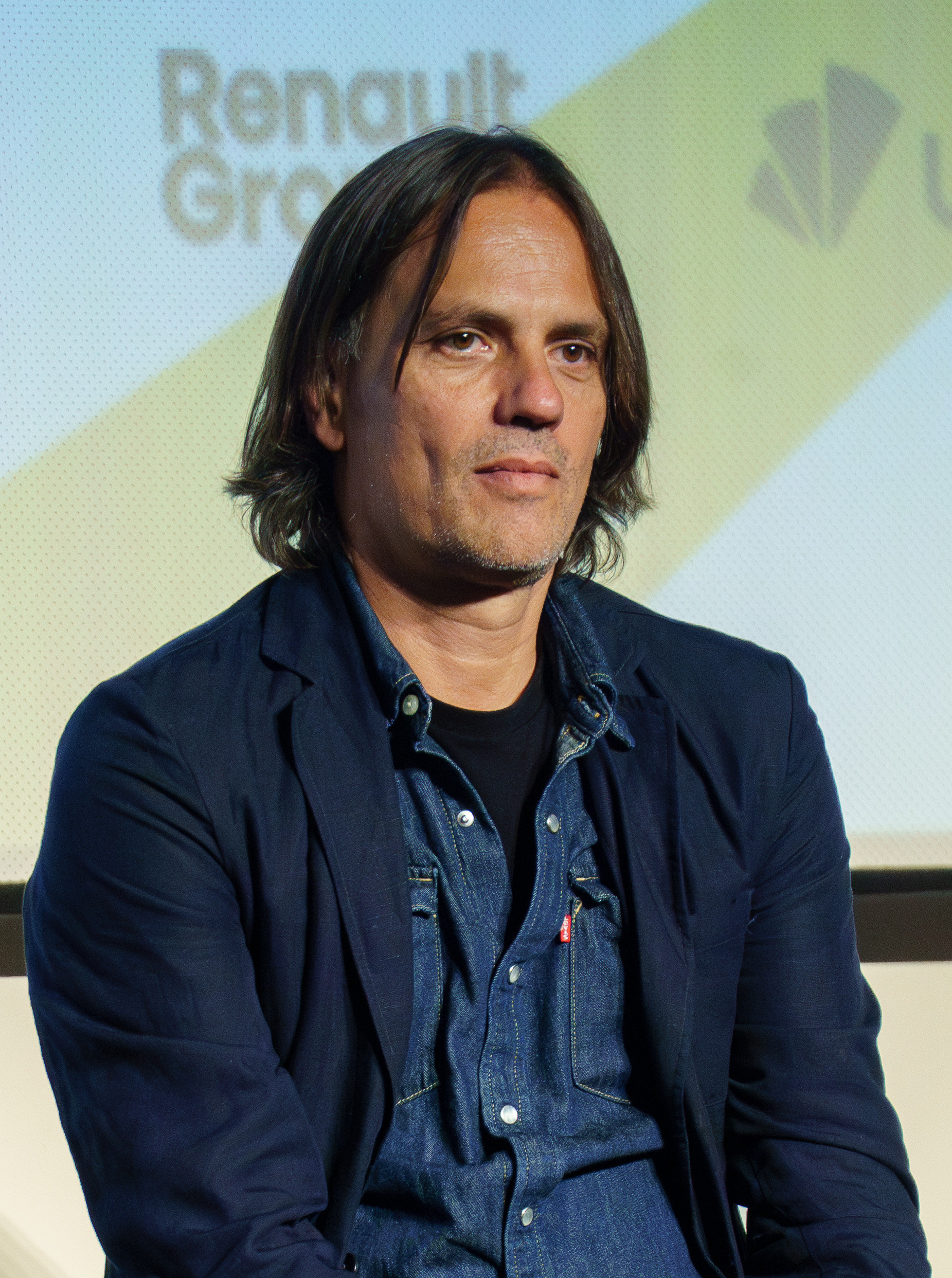
- Cobos in 2025
- Born: Rafael Cobos López; 1973 (age 51–52); Seville, Spain
- Occupations: Screenwriter; playwright

Rafael Cobos López (born 1973) is a Spanish screenwriter and playwright. He is a recurring co-scribe of Alberto Rodríguez's films. He has won two Goya Awards (for Marshland and Smoke & Mirrors).

== Biography ==
Rafael Cobos López was born in 1973 in Seville. After starting studies in medicine, he dropped out and switched to a degree in audiovisual communication.

Together with Rodríguez, Cobos has penned the screenplays of the films 7 Virgins (2005), After, Marshland (2014), Smoke & Mirrors (2016), Prison 77 (2022) and the television series La peste.

He has also participated in the writing of Kike Maíllo's Toro (2016).

== Filmography ==
Feature films

Year	Title	Notes
2005	7 Virgins	Co-written with Alberto Rodríguez; Also acting coach
2009	After	Co-wrote story with Alberto Rodríguez; Also assistant director
2012	Unit 7	Co-wrote story with Alberto Rodríguez; Also acting coach
2012	Ali	Co-written with Paco R. Baños
2013	Love Is Not What It Used to Be	Co-written with Ada Hernández & Gabriel Ochoa
2014	Marshland	Co-written with Alberto Rodríguez
2016	Toro	Co-written with Fernando Navarro
2016	Smoke & Mirrors	Co-written with Alberto Rodríguez
2019	Me, Myself and My Dead Wife	Co-written with Santi Amodeo
2021	The Gentiles	Collaboration writing with Santi Amodeo
2022	Prison 77	Co-written with Alberto Rodríguez
2025	Ellas en la ciudad	Co-written with Reyes Gallego; Also executive producer
2025	Los Tigres	Co-written with Alberto Rodríguez; Also executive producer
2025	Golpes	Co-written with Fernando Navarro; Also director and song writer

Television

Year	Title	Writer	Creator	Notes
2018-2019	La peste	Yes	Yes	Co-created with Alberto Rodríguez; 12 episodes
2022	Offworld	Yes	Developer	Wrote episode “Supervivencia”
2023	The Left-Handed Son	Yes	Yes	Also directed 2 episodes
2025	The Anatomy of a Moment	Yes	No	Co-written with Alberto Rodríguez & Fran Araujo
