= Fernando Navarro (screenwriter) =

Spanish writer

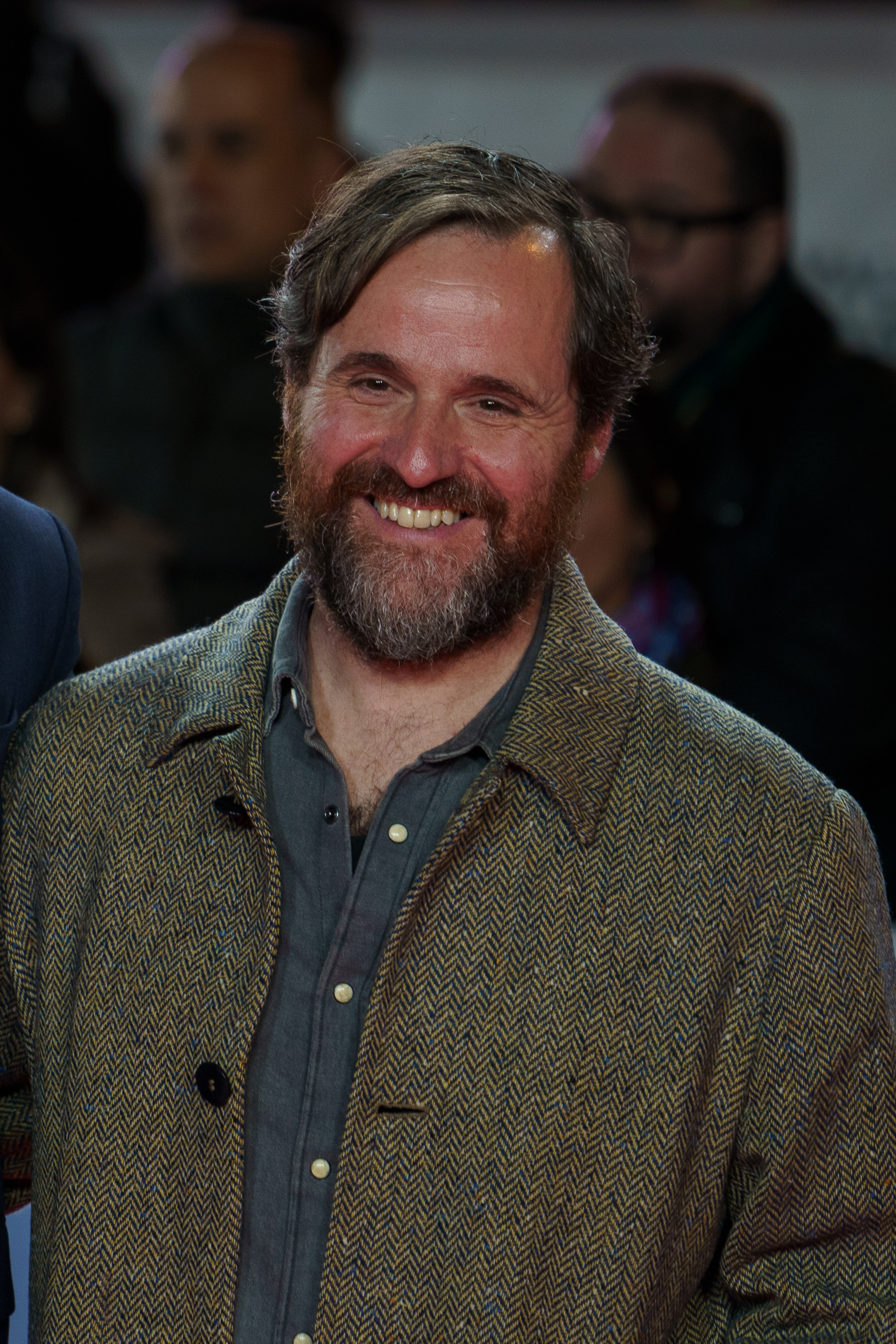
- Navarro in 2025
- Born: 1980 (age 45–46); Granada, Spain
- Occupations: Screenwriter; music critic

Fernando Navarro (born 1980) is a Spanish screenwriter. He is also a music critic.

== Biography ==
Fernando Navarro was born in Granada in 1980. After considering to try to become a drummer for a music band, he started writing film screenplays. He has since penned or co-penned the screenplays of Toro, Spy Time, Veronica, Muse, Taxi to Gibraltar, Unknown Origins, Below Zero, A Perfect Enemy, and Venus. He has also formed part of the writing team of television series Matadero and ¿Qué fue de Jorge Sanz?.

He has been nominated twice to the Goya Awards; for Veronica (Best Original Screenplay) and for Unknown Origins (Best Adapted Screenplay).

In 2022, Navarro released his first book, Malaventura, published by Impedimenta.
